= 2024 F1 Academy season =

Women's motor racing championship

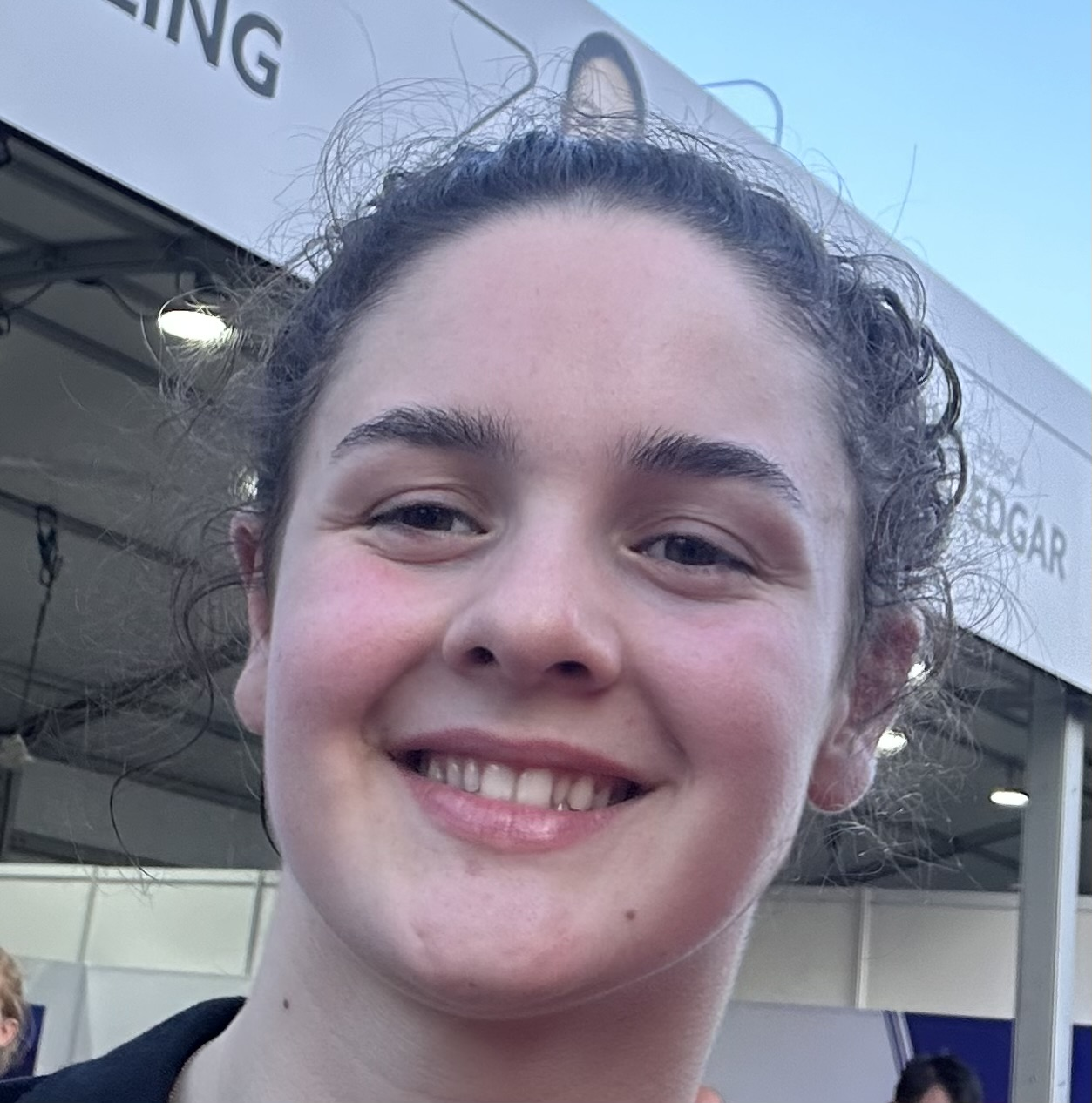
Abbi Pulling won the Drivers' Championship, driving for Rodin Motorsport.

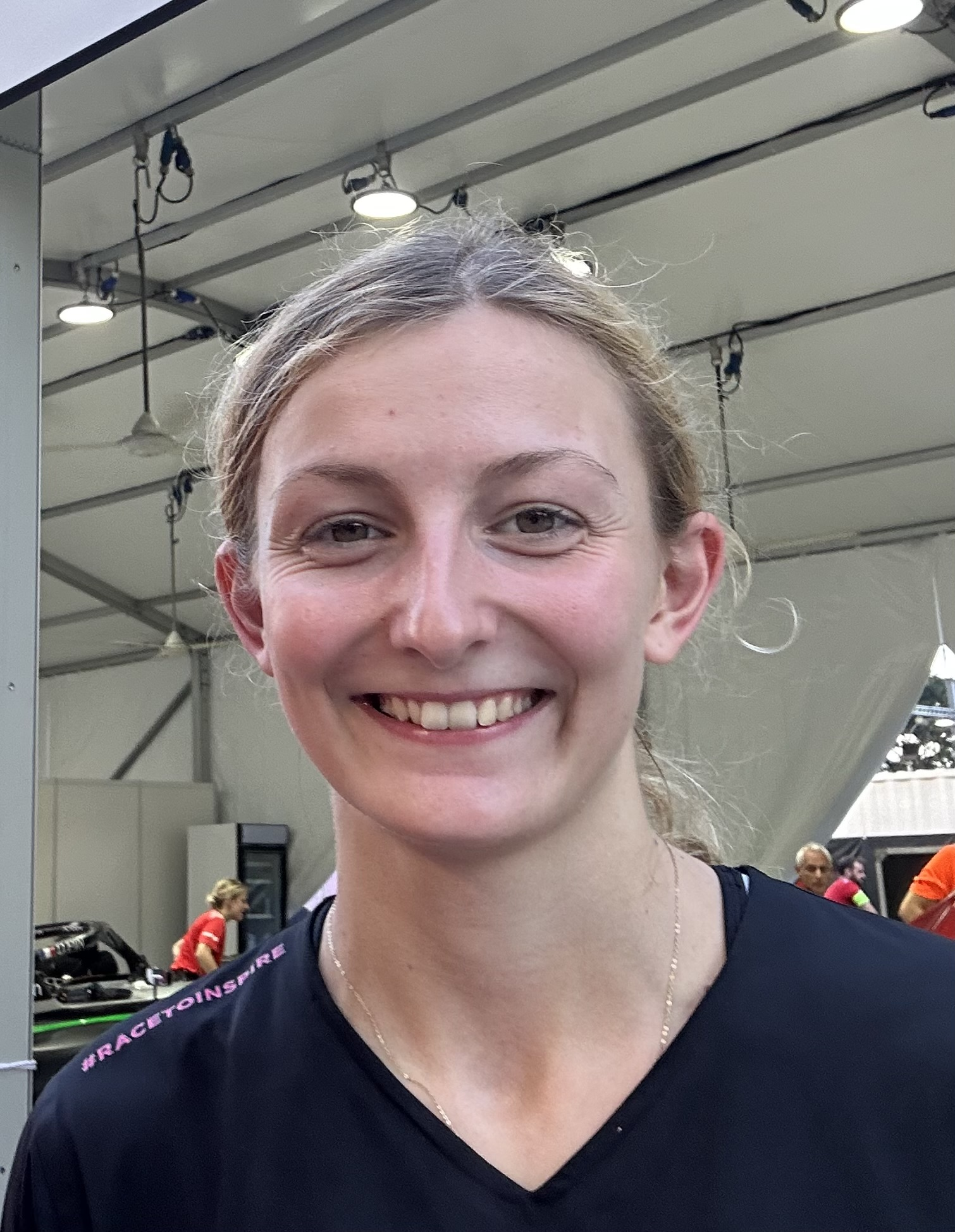
Doriane Pin finished runner-up, driving for Prema Racing.

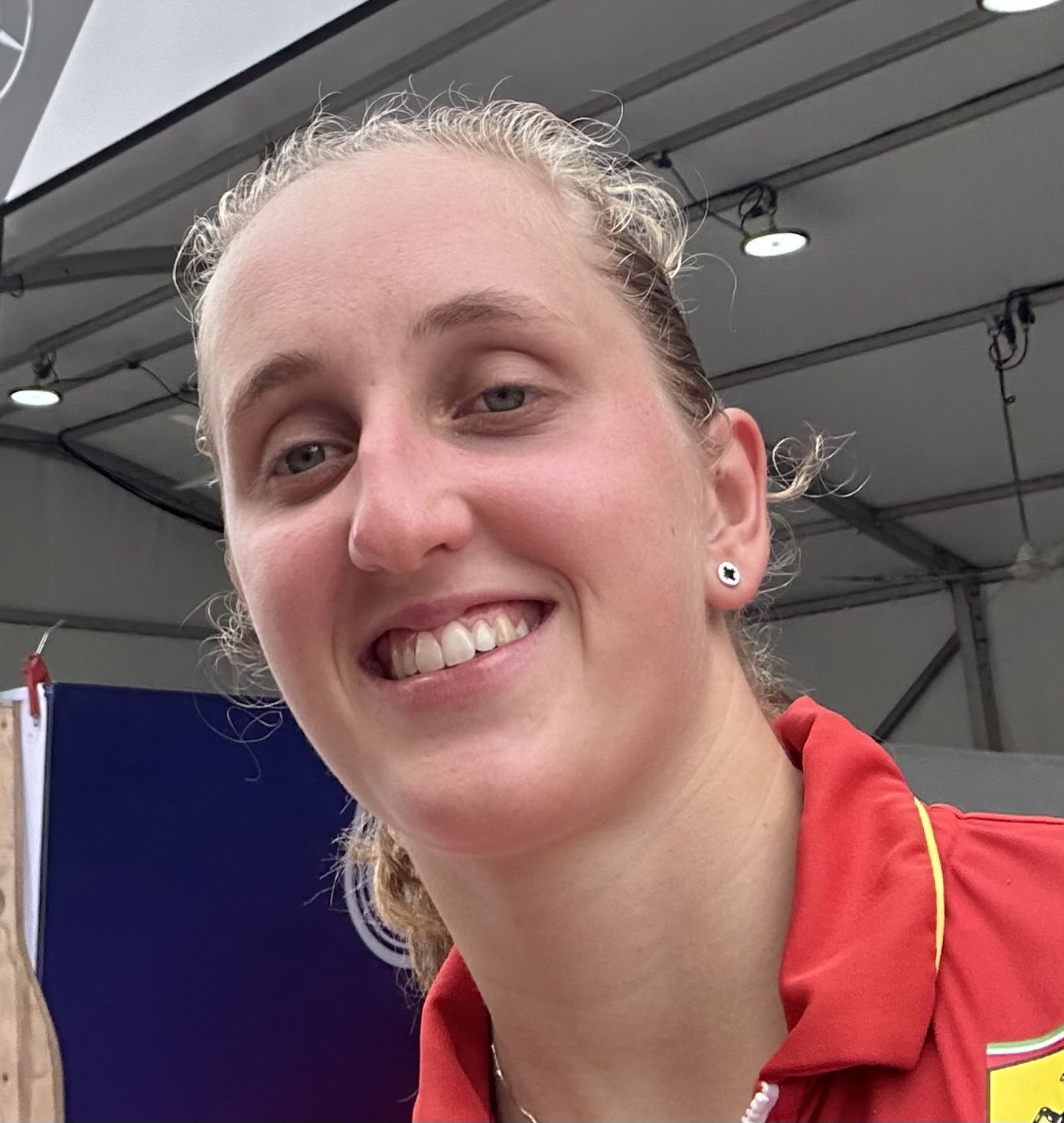
Maya Weug finished third, driving for Prema Racing.

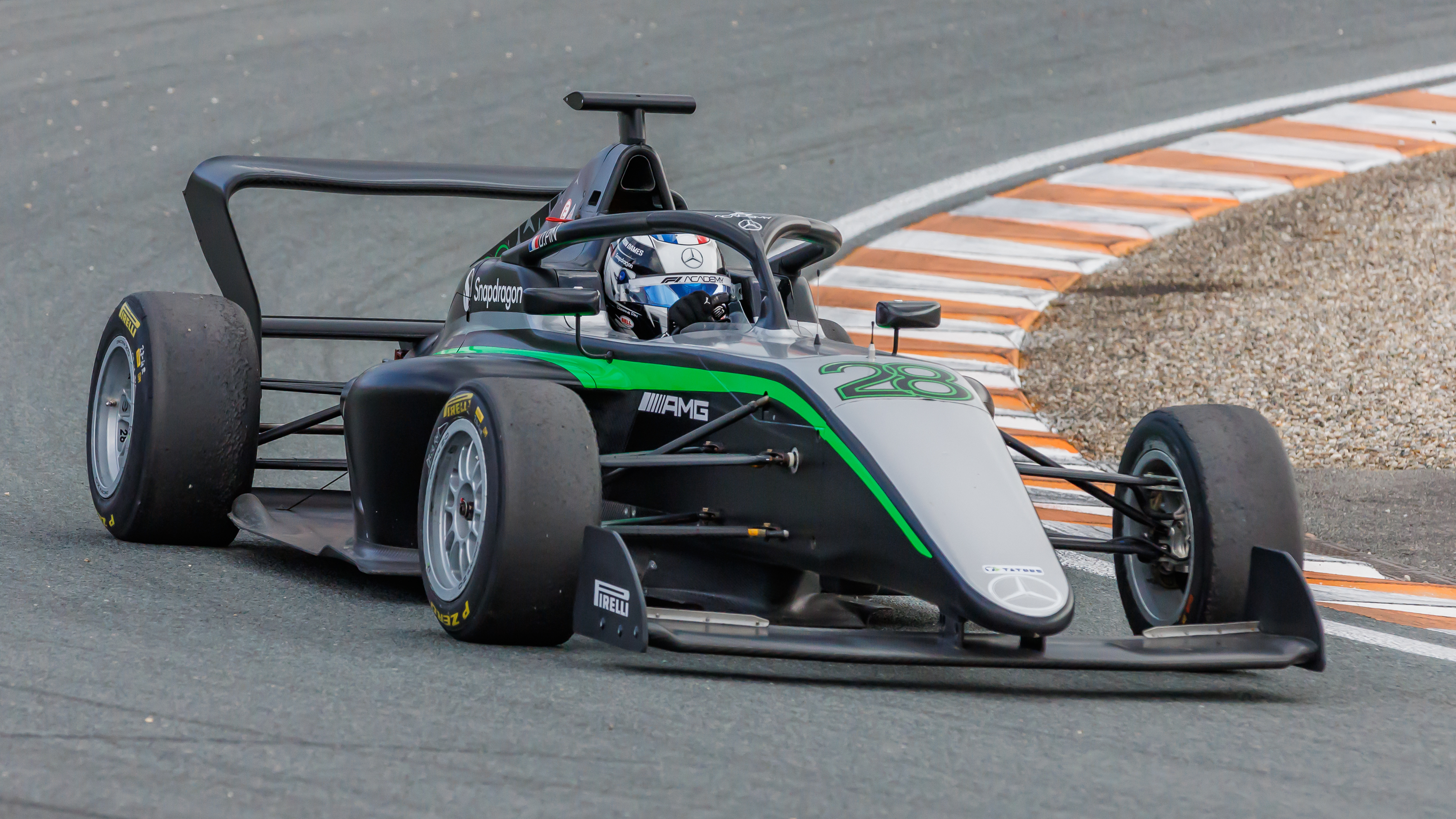
Prema Racing won their second Teams' Championship.

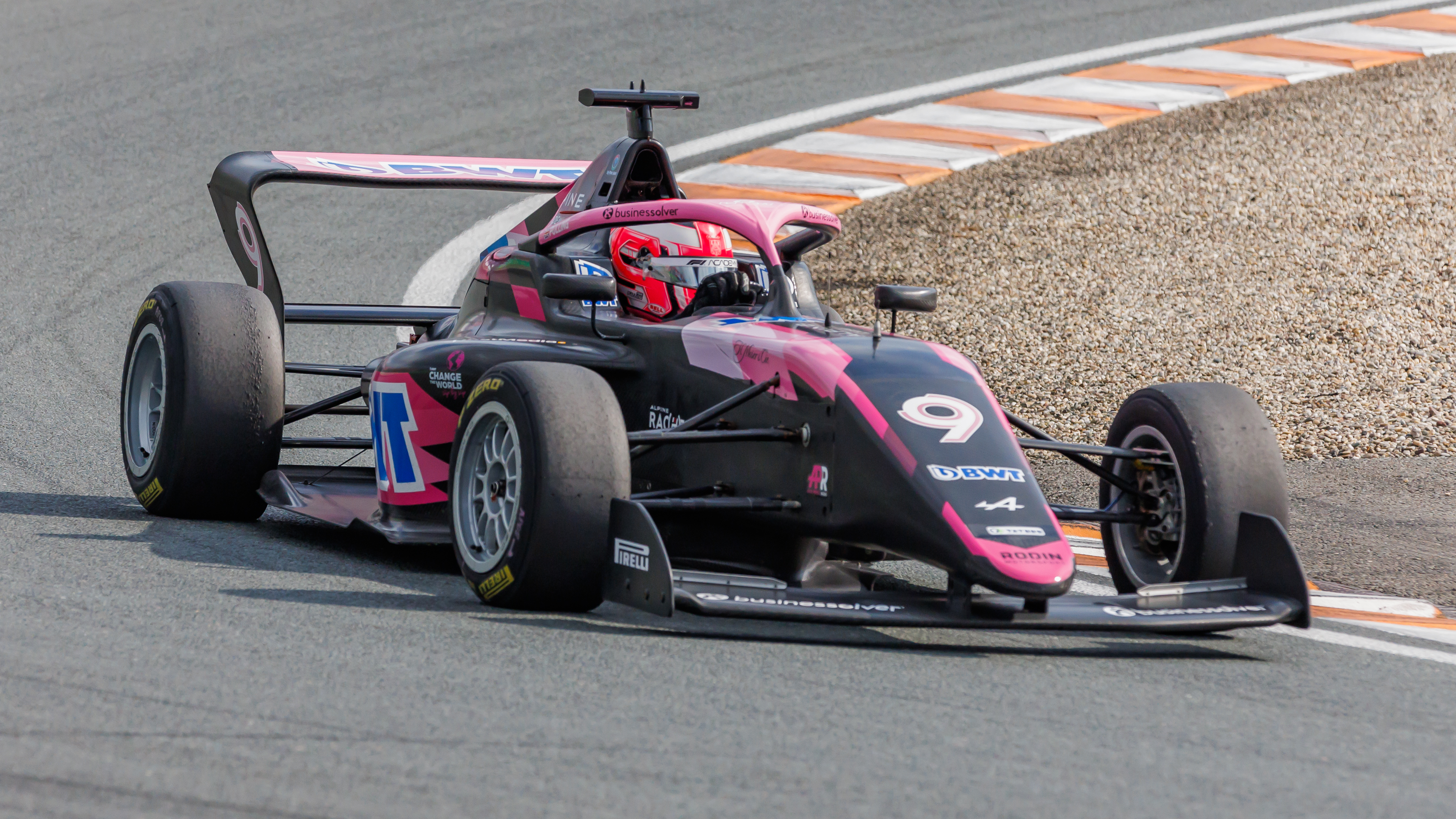
Rodin Motorsport finished second in the Teams' Championship.

The 2024 F1 Academy season was an open-wheel racing championship and the second season of F1 Academy, an all-female, Formula 4-level racing series founded and organized under the management of Formula Motorsport Limited. All seven rounds were run in support of selected rounds of the 2024 Formula One World Championship, with 10 of the 15 drivers' cars sporting liveries sponsored by the 10 teams competing in Formula One during 2024.

Prema Racing started the season as defending team's champions, having won the 2023 title with inaugural drivers' champion Marta García, and retained the team's championship after winning the final race. Abbi Pulling won the drivers' championship with Rodin Motorsport, clinching the title after scoring pole position for the first race at Abu Dhabi.

== Entries ==
The following teams and drivers competed in the 2024 F1 Academy season. As the championship was a spec series; all teams competed with an identical Tatuus F4-T421 chassis and tyre compounds developed by Pirelli. Each car was powered by a 165-horsepower turbocharged 4-cylinder engine developed by Autotecnica.

For the 2024 season onwards, all Formula One teams would support one driver and have their livery on the driver's car. The remaining drivers (including the wildcard entrants) were supported by the series' other partners. Additionally, the driver contribution was reduced from €150,000 to €100,000.

Full season entries
Teams	No.	Driver	Supporting F1 team	Rounds	Ref.
(New Zealand) Rodin Motorsport	3	(France) Lola Lovinfosse	—N/a	All	
(New Zealand) Rodin Motorsport	9	(United Kingdom) Abbi Pulling	(France) Alpine	All	
(New Zealand) Rodin Motorsport	17	(United Kingdom) Jessica Edgar	—N/a	All	
(Netherlands) MP Motorsport	7	(Netherlands) Emely de Heus	—N/a (Note: De Heus is a Red Bull Academy Programme member, but her entry is not supported by either of the Red Bull–owned teams.)	All	
(Netherlands) MP Motorsport	8	(United Arab Emirates) Hamda Al Qubaisi	(Austria) Red Bull Racing	All	
(Netherlands) MP Motorsport	88	(United Arab Emirates) Amna Al Qubaisi	(Italy) RB	All	
(Spain) Campos Racing	14	(United States) Chloe Chambers	(United States) Haas	All	
(Spain) Campos Racing	15	(Germany) Carrie Schreiner	(Switzerland) Sauber	All	
(Spain) Campos Racing	30	(Spain) Nerea Martí	—N/a	All	
(France) ART Grand Prix	16	(Philippines) Bianca Bustamante	(United Kingdom) McLaren	All	
(France) ART Grand Prix	22	(Brazil) Aurelia Nobels	—N/a (Note: Nobels is a Ferrari Driver Academy member, but her entry is not supported by the F1 team.)	All	
(France) ART Grand Prix	57	(United States) Lia Block	(United Kingdom) Williams	All	
(Italy) Prema Racing	19	(Switzerland) Tina Hausmann	(United Kingdom) Aston Martin	All	
(Italy) Prema Racing	28	(France) Doriane Pin	(Germany) Mercedes	All	
(Italy) Prema Racing	64	(Netherlands) Maya Weug	(Italy) Ferrari	All	
Wildcard entries
(Italy) Prema Racing	4	(Netherlands) Nina Gademan	—N/a	4	
(Italy) Prema Racing	5	(United Kingdom) Ella Lloyd	—N/a	5	
(Italy) Prema Racing	6	(United Kingdom) Alisha Palmowski	—N/a	6	
(Italy) Prema Racing	18	(Saudi Arabia) Reema Juffali	—N/a	1	
(Italy) Prema Racing	54	(United Arab Emirates) Logan Hannah	—N/a	7	
(Italy) Prema Racing	77	(United States) Courtney Crone	—N/a	2	

=== Team changes ===
- Rodin Carlin was rebranded as Rodin Motorsport, after the Carlin family departed the team and Rodin Cars took full ownership.

=== Driver changes ===
- Prema Racing fielded an all new line-up following the departure of Marta García, who progressed to the Formula Regional European Championship; Chloe Chong, who joined JHR Developments in British F4; and Bianca Bustamante, who switched to ART Grand Prix. The team's new drivers were Aston Martin-affiliated Tina Hausmann, Mercedes Junior Team driver Doriane Pin, and Ferrari Driver Academy member Maya Weug.
- Megan Gilkes left Rodin Motorsport and retired from professional racing. She was replaced by Lola Lovinfosse, who joined from Campos Racing.
- ART Grand Prix promoted Léna Bühler to the Formula Regional European Championship, while Carrie Schreiner and Chloe Grant both left the team. Bianca Bustamante joined the team after leaving Prema Racing, supported by the McLaren Driver Development Programme. She was partnered by Williams Driver Academy member Lia Block, making her open-wheel racing debut and Ferrari Driver Academy member Aurelia Nobels.
- Campos Racing signed Sauber Academy member Carrie Schreiner after her departure from ART Grand Prix. The team also fielded Haas-backed driver Chloe Chambers. They replaced Lola Lovinfosse, who switched to Rodin Motorsport, and Maite Cáceres, who returned to F4 United States.

=== Wildcard entries ===
Wildcard entries were added for the 2024 season. Selected drivers were offered a drive operated by Prema Racing (in addition to their three permanent entries) for a single weekend in select rounds and were eligible to score points in the Drivers' Championship. Susie Wolff stated the goals of the wildcard entries were to "promote regional talent, engage with local communities, and increase the talent pool in the regions in which we race".

- Saudi Arabian GT driver Reema Juffali was the wildcard entry for the first round of the season in Jeddah with the support of MUHRA.
- American LMP3 and GT driver Courtney Crone was the wildcard entry for the second round of the season in Miami, supported by QVC.
- Dutch driver Nina Gademan, who competed in the 2024 British F4 Championship, was chosen as the wildcard for the fourth round in Zandvoort, supported by series partner The Female Quotient.
- British F4 driver Ella Lloyd was the wildcard entry for the fifth round in Singapore, competing in an F1 Academy 'Discover Your Drive' livery.
- British GB4 Vice-Champion Alisha Palmowski was the wildcard entry for the sixth round in Qatar, also competing in an F1 Academy 'Discover Your Drive' livery.
- Dubai-based Scottish driver Logan Hannah was the wildcard entry for the seventh round in Abu Dhabi. She raced under an Emirati licence and her entry was supported by Away.

== Calendar ==
The calendar for the 2024 season was announced in October 2023, reducing to two races a weekend instead of three and having a singular qualifying session. All seven rounds supported the 2024 Formula One World Championship.

Round	Circuit	Race 1	Race 2	Race 3
1	(Saudi Arabia) Jeddah Corniche Circuit, Jeddah	8 March	9 March	—N/a
2	(United States) Miami International Autodrome, Miami	4 May	5 May	—N/a
3	(Spain) Circuit de Barcelona-Catalunya, Barcelona	22 June	23 June	—N/a
4	(Netherlands) Circuit Zandvoort, Zandvoort	25 August		—N/a
5	Marina Bay Street Circuit, Singapore	21 September	22 September	—N/a
6	(Qatar) Lusail International Circuit, Lusail	30 November	—N/a	—N/a
7	(United Arab Emirates) Yas Marina Circuit, Abu Dhabi	7 December		8 December

=== Calendar changes ===
The Red Bull Ring, Monza Circuit, Circuit Paul Ricard, Circuit Ricardo Tormo, and Circuit of the Americas were all removed from the calendar due to the series becoming a part of the Formula One support program full-time. At the same time, the Miami International Autodrome, Marina Bay Street Circuit, Lusail International Circuit, and the Yas Marina Circuit became new additions to the calendar. The Jeddah Street Circuit hosted the opening round.

After Race 2 at Lusail was cancelled due to barrier repairs, a third race was added to the Yas Marina round.

== Season summary ==
=== Round 1: Jeddah ===
The season started off at the Jeddah Street Circuit. Doriane Pin took pole by nearly eight tenths from Abbi Pulling and Maya Weug. During the first race, wildcard driver Reema Juffali collided with Amna Al Qubaisi on lap 2, while Jessica Edgar sustained a puncture midway after contact with Tina Hausmann. Pin won the race from Pulling and Weug.

In the second race, Chloe Chambers tagged Lola Lovinfosse into a spin on lap 3. Lovinfosse re-entered the track directly in the path of Lia Block, which earned her a five-place grid penalty for the next race. The sole safety car period happened after Juffali crashed out on lap 6. Pin crossed the finish line first, but was unaware that the race ended and took the chequered flag twice. She was investigated and later penalised for the mistake. Pulling inherited the win ahead of Weug and Nerea Martí, with Pin moving down to ninth. Pulling left Jeddah as the championship leader, with Weug in second and Pin in third.

=== Round 2: Miami ===
Pulling took pole in the next round at the Miami International Autodrome. In the first race, Bianca Bustamante stalled from fourth on the grid and could only recover to ninth with the fastest lap. Lap one contact from Aurelia Nobels spun Hausmann into the wall, which caused her retirement and a 10-second time penalty for Nobels. Block spun on lap 7, but remained in the race. Pulling took a comfortable victory from Pin, while Chambers achieved her first podium in the series from Weug, who eventually fell to sixth after a penalty.

Pulling started again from pole in the second race. Lovinfosse locked up in the first corner and tagged Hausmann, who was forced to retire for the second race in a row. On lap 8 Lovinfosse locked up again, this time hitting Nobels. Both were able to rejoin the race, with Lovinfosse earning two 10-second time penalties for her collisions. Edgar spun on lap 11 but was able to rejoin the race. Pulling once again crossed the finish line in first, but this time it was Bustamante who would finish second ahead of Pin.

=== Round 3: Barcelona ===
Pulling claimed her third and fourth pole positions in a row as the series began its European leg at the Circuit de Barcelona-Catalunya, with title rival Pin only fourth as she recovered from fractured ribs sustained in the break between events. Pin's problems were compounded when she stalled at the start of Race 1, and fought back to only seventh as Pulling claimed her fourth race win in a row. A safety car was called after Weug and Amna Al Qubaisi collided. Martí and Chambers survived minor first-corner contact to finish second and third respectively.

Chambers dominated the second race of the weekend, jumping Pulling at the start and taking a lights-to-flag win. It was Chambers' maiden F1 Academy victory. The win allowed Chambers to draw level with Pin for second in the championship, both of whom sat 66 points behind Pulling.

=== Round 4: Zandvoort ===
Race 1 at the Circuit Zandvoort was rescheduled to Sunday and shortened to 13 laps after adverse weather postponed the original start. Pulling again started from pole position and took another dominant lights-to-flag victory. Pin crossed the line in second, but received a 5-second time penalty for a jump start, which dropped her down to fifth place. Martí and Weug rounded out the podium, while Nina Gademan finished fourth, becoming the first wildcard entry to score points.

Pin returned to pole position for Race 2. Block and Edgar both stalled on the start, and Martí was pushed wide in the first corner. A battle between Nobels and Gademan ended with Nobels taking a trip through the gravel and Gademan receiving a 10-second time penalty for causing a collision. Pin took the fastest lap and the victory ahead of Weug and Pulling. All three drivers finished within 2.2 seconds of each other, and a 12-second gap to fourth place.

=== Round 5: Singapore ===
Pulling once again took both pole positions for the weekend at the Marina Bay Street Circuit. Race 1 was shortened to 11 laps after a second formation lap was taken because Bustamante missed her grid box, for which she received a 10-second stop and go penalty. Emely de Heus spun on lap 6, but was able to rejoin the race. Pin was once again penalized for jumping the start, but she managed to build a gap and was still classified in her finishing position of third, while earning a point for the fastest lap. Wildcard driver Ella Lloyd also received a 5-second penalty for a jump start. Pulling finished in first, ahead of Weug.

Pulling took another lights-to-flag victory in Race 2. Weug and Pin battled for second over the first lap, with Weug ending in front of Pin. The safety car came out on lap 4 after Bustamante hit the curb and spun, although she was able to rejoin the race. On the restart there was contact between Bustamante and Hausmann, with the latter receiving a 10-second penalty. Block achieved her highest finish of the season, ending in fourth place for both races.

=== Round 6: Qatar ===
Pin took pole position for both races at the Lusail International Circuit. Pulling overtook Weug at the start of Race 1, ensuring enough points to become the 2024 Champion with 3 races to spare. A 5-second penalty for jumping the start was given to Chambers and to Hausmann, dropping the pair from seventh to eleventh and from fourteenth to fifteenth, respectively. Bustamante spun on lap 12 but was able to rejoin the race. Pin won the race, her third victory of the season.

Race 2 was cancelled after a crash barrier that was damaged from the preceding Porsche Carrera Cup Middle East race could not be repaired in time. This was the first instance of a cancelled race in the series.

=== Round 7: Abu Dhabi ===
As a result of the cancellation of Race 2 in Qatar, F1 Academy announced that a third race would be added in Abu Dhabi at the Yas Marina Circuit. Race 3's starting grid would be decided by the drivers' third-fastest time set in the qualifying session. This meant two more points were in given than initially scheduled, with Pulling no longer champion elect, as Pin could win the title if she swept the weekend and Pulling failed to score any points. In qualifying, Pulling took all three poles for the season finale and scored 6 points, to re-secure the drivers' championship.

In Race 1, Chambers took the lead into the first corner, but spun on the first lap and received a 5-second penalty for an unsafe rejoin. On lap 6, Hausmann hit the back of Lovinfosse, who was then spun by Chambers. Hausmann was given a 10-second penalty for the incident, which was added to a 5-second penalty she received earlier in the race for leaving the track and gaining an advantage. Abbi Pulling won the race, ahead of Hamda Al Qubaisi and Doriane Pin.

Race 2 was the first race with multiple lead changes, as Pulling and Chambers battled for the win. On lap 1, Lovinfosse crashed into Schreiner and sent her airborne. Schreiner was forced to retire the car, and Lovinfosse received a 10-second penalty for causing a collision, while Amna Al Qubaisi also received a 10-second penalty for leaving the track and gaining an advantage when she evaded the incident. On lap 12, Lovinfosse hit a bollard while trying to make a move on the inside of Jessica Edgar, which spun the latter and also resulted in contact with Nobels. This caused a safety car, which lasted until the end of the race, where Pulling took her ninth victory ahead of Chambers and Hamda Al Qubaisi. After the race concluded, Amna Al Qubaisi was given a 10-second penalty for causing a collision with Block, and Lovinfosse was given a five-place grid drop for Race 3, for causing the collision with Edgar and Nobels.

Nobels stalled on the starting grid of Race 3, but was able to get going and continue the race. Pin and Chambers collided into the first corner, resulting in a front wing change and 10-second penalty for Chambers, who also later received a 5-second penalty for a jump start. On lap 4, Bustamante collided with Hamda Al Qubaisi, and was given a 10-second penalty for causing a collision. Multiple cars cut the chicane on lap 7, resulting in a 5-second penalty for Edgar and Block, and a 10-second penalty for Amna Al Qubaisi. Block was then given an additional 10-second penalty for spinning Hamda Al Qubaisi on lap 12, which caused a safety car. Maya Weug's 10-second lead was neutralized by the safety car, but she successfully defended against Pulling on the restart, to take her maiden victory and secure the teams' championship for Prema.

== Race results and standings ==
Round		Circuit	Pole position	Fastest lap	Winning driver	Winning team
1	R1	(Saudi Arabia) Jeddah Corniche Circuit	(France) Doriane Pin	(United Kingdom) Abbi Pulling	(France) Doriane Pin	(Italy) Prema Racing
1	R2	(Saudi Arabia) Jeddah Corniche Circuit	(France) Doriane Pin	(France) Doriane Pin	(United Kingdom) Abbi Pulling (Note: Doriane Pin finished first on track, but was given a post-race drive-through penalty due to crossing the chequered flag twice. This was converted into a 20-second time penalty, and Pulling inherited the win.)	(New Zealand) Rodin Motorsport
2	R1	(United States) Miami International Autodrome	(United Kingdom) Abbi Pulling	(Philippines) Bianca Bustamante	(United Kingdom) Abbi Pulling	(New Zealand) Rodin Motorsport
2	R2	(United States) Miami International Autodrome	(United Kingdom) Abbi Pulling	(United Kingdom) Abbi Pulling	(United Kingdom) Abbi Pulling	(New Zealand) Rodin Motorsport
3	R1	(Spain) Circuit de Barcelona-Catalunya	(United Kingdom) Abbi Pulling	(United Kingdom) Abbi Pulling	(United Kingdom) Abbi Pulling	(New Zealand) Rodin Motorsport
3	R2	(Spain) Circuit de Barcelona-Catalunya	(United Kingdom) Abbi Pulling	(United States) Chloe Chambers	(United States) Chloe Chambers	(Spain) Campos Racing
4	R1	(Netherlands) Circuit Zandvoort	(United Kingdom) Abbi Pulling	(United Kingdom) Abbi Pulling	(United Kingdom) Abbi Pulling	(New Zealand) Rodin Motorsport
4	R2	(Netherlands) Circuit Zandvoort	(France) Doriane Pin	(France) Doriane Pin	(France) Doriane Pin	(Italy) Prema Racing
5	R1	(Singapore) Marina Bay Street Circuit	(United Kingdom) Abbi Pulling	(France) Doriane Pin	(United Kingdom) Abbi Pulling	(New Zealand) Rodin Motorsport
5	R2	(Singapore) Marina Bay Street Circuit	(United Kingdom) Abbi Pulling	(United Kingdom) Abbi Pulling	(United Kingdom) Abbi Pulling	(New Zealand) Rodin Motorsport
6	R1	(Qatar) Lusail International Circuit	(France) Doriane Pin	(France) Doriane Pin	(France) Doriane Pin	(Italy) Prema Racing
6	R2	(Qatar) Lusail International Circuit	(France) Doriane Pin	Race cancelled (Note: Race 2 in Qatar was cancelled due to barrier damage caused by a crash in the preceding Porsche Carrera Cup Middle East race, which could not be repaired in time for the F1 Academy race to go ahead.)		
7	R1	(United Arab Emirates) Yas Marina Circuit	(United Kingdom) Abbi Pulling	(United Kingdom) Abbi Pulling	(United Kingdom) Abbi Pulling	(New Zealand) Rodin Motorsport
7	R2	(United Arab Emirates) Yas Marina Circuit	(United Kingdom) Abbi Pulling	(United States) Chloe Chambers	(United Kingdom) Abbi Pulling	(New Zealand) Rodin Motorsport
7	R3	(United Arab Emirates) Yas Marina Circuit	(United Kingdom) Abbi Pulling	(Netherlands) Maya Weug	(Netherlands) Maya Weug	(Italy) Prema Racing

=== Scoring system ===
Two points will be awarded to the driver(s) who start Race 1 and Race 2 from pole position. Fastest lap points are also handed out in each race to the driver and team who achieved the fastest valid lap time and classified inside the top 10. No points are given to the driver who clocked in the fastest lap time but finished outside the top 10 or if the leader has completed less than 50% of the scheduled race distance.

Position, points per race
1st	2nd	3rd	4th	5th	6th	7th	8th	9th	10th	Pole	FL
25	18	15	12	10	8	6	4	2	1	2	1

=== Drivers' championship ===
Pos.	Driver	JED (Saudi Arabia)		MIA (United States)		CAT (Spain)		ZAN (Netherlands)		SIN (Singapore)		LSL (Qatar)		YMC (United Arab Emirates)			Points
Pos.	Driver	R1	R2	R1	R2	R1	R2	R1	R2	R1	R2	R1	R2	R1	R2	R3	Points
1	(United Kingdom) Abbi Pulling	2^{F}	1	1^{P}	1^{P}^{F}	1^{P}^{F}	2^{P}	1^{P}^{F}	3	1^{P}	1^{P}^{F}	2	C	1^{P}^{F}	1^{P}	2^{P}	338
2	(France) Doriane Pin	1^{P}	9^{P}^{F}	2	3	7	5	5	1^{P}^{F}	3^{F}	3	1^{P}^{F}	C^{P}	3	4	5	217
3	(Netherlands) Maya Weug	3	2	6	5	Ret	13	3	2	2	2	3	C	7	5	1^{F}	177
4	(Spain) Nerea Martí	14†	3	4	7	2	4	2	8	7	5	8	C	6	6	3	136
5	(United Arab Emirates) Hamda Al Qubaisi	9	5	5	6	5	3	8	4	6	6	4	C	2	3	10	133
6	(United States) Chloe Chambers	4	10	3	4	3	1^{F}	6	12	5	8	11	C	11	2^{F}	16	122
7	(Philippines) Bianca Bustamante	5	6	9^{F}	2	4	7	14	11	16	14	16	C	5	7	14	73
8	(United States) Lia Block	16†	11	15	10	10	6	9	15	4	4	6	C	12	12	15	44
9	(Germany) Carrie Schreiner	10	7	12	9	12	11	10	6	8	9	12	C	9	Ret	6	34
10	(Switzerland) Tina Hausmann	6	13	Ret	Ret	9	8	11	9	10	16	15	C	15	9	4	31
11	(Netherlands) Emely de Heus	12	12	11	12	6	10	15	13	15	10	10	C	4	8	9	29
12	(Brazil) Aurelia Nobels	7	Ret	13	13	13	14	7	5	14	12	9	C	10	11	8	29
13	(United Kingdom) Jessica Edgar	15	4	7	14	8	15	12	16	13	15	7	C	16	Ret	12	28
14	(France) Lola Lovinfosse	8	Ret	10	15	11	9	13	7	11	13	14	C	13	Ret	7	19
15	(United Arab Emirates) Amna Al Qubaisi	13	8	8	8	Ret	12	16	14	12	11	13	C	8	13	13	16
16	(Netherlands) Nina Gademan							4	10								13
17	(United Kingdom) Alisha Palmowski											5	C				10
18	(United Kingdom) Ella Lloyd									9	7						8
19	(United Arab Emirates) Logan Hannah													14	10	11	1
20	(United States) Courtney Crone			14	11												0
21	(Saudi Arabia) Reema Juffali	11	Ret														0
Pos.	Driver	R1	R2	R1	R2	R1	R2	R1	R2	R1	R2	R1	R2	R1	R2	R3	Points
Pos.	Driver	JED (Saudi Arabia)		MIA (United States)		CAT (Spain)		ZAN (Netherlands)		SIN (Singapore)		LSL (Qatar)		YMC (United Arab Emirates)			Points

Colour	Result
Gold	Winner
Silver	Second place
Bronze	Third place
Green	Points classification
Blue	Non-points classification
Blue	Non-classified finish (NC)
Purple	Retired, not classified (Ret)
Red	Did not qualify (DNQ)
Red	Did not pre-qualify (DNPQ)
Black	Disqualified (DSQ)
White	Did not start (DNS)
White	Withdrew (WD)
White	Race cancelled (C)
Blank	Did not practice (DNP)
Blank	Did not arrive (DNA)
Blank	Excluded (EX)

^{P} – Pole
^{F} – Fastest Lap
† — Did not finish, but classified

=== Teams' championship ===
Pos.	Team	JED (Saudi Arabia)		MIA (United States)		CAT (Spain)		ZAN (Netherlands)		SIN (Singapore)		LUS (Qatar)		YMC (United Arab Emirates)			Points
Pos.	Team	R1	R2	R1	R2	R1	R2	R1	R2	R1	R2	R1	R2	R1	R2	R3	Points
1	(Italy) Prema Racing	1^{P}	2	2	3	7	5	3	1^{P}^{F}	2	2	1^{P}^{F}	C^{P}	3	4	1^{F}	423
1	(Italy) Prema Racing	3	9^{P}^{F}	6	5	9	8	5	2	3^{F}	3	3	C	7	5	4	423
1	(Italy) Prema Racing	6	13	Ret	Ret	Ret	13	11	9	10	16	15	C	15	9	6	423
2	(New Zealand) Rodin Motorsport	2^{F}	1	1^{P}	1^{P}^{F}	1^{P}^{F}	2^{P}	1^{P}^{F}	3	1^{P}	1^{P}^{F}	2	C	1^{P}^{F}	1^{P}	2^{P}	393
2	(New Zealand) Rodin Motorsport	8	4	7	14	8	9	12	7	11	13	7	C	13	Ret	5	393
2	(New Zealand) Rodin Motorsport	15	Ret	10	15	11	15	13	16	13	15	14	C	16	Ret	8	393
3	(Spain) Campos Racing	4	3	3	4	2	1^{F}	2	6	5	5	8	C	6	2^{F}	3	290
3	(Spain) Campos Racing	10	7	4	7	3	4	6	8	7	8	11	C	9	6	7	290
3	(Spain) Campos Racing	14†	10	12	9	12	11	10	12	8	9	12	C	11	Ret	16	290
4	(Netherlands) MP Motorsport	9	5	5	6	5	3	8	4	6	6	4	C	2	3	10	176
4	(Netherlands) MP Motorsport	12	8	8	8	6	10	15	13	12	10	10	C	4	8	11	176
4	(Netherlands) MP Motorsport	13	12	11	12	Ret	12	16	14	15	11	13	C	8	13	13	176
5	(France) ART Grand Prix	5	6	9^{F}	2	4	6	7	5	4	4	6	C	5	7	9	144
5	(France) ART Grand Prix	7	11	13	10	10	7	9	11	14	12	9	C	10	11	14	144
5	(France) ART Grand Prix	16†	Ret	15	13	13	14	14	15	16	14	16	C	12	12	15	144
Pos.	Team	R1	R2	R1	R2	R1	R2	R1	R2	R1	R2	R1	R2	R1	R2	R3	Points
Pos.	Team	JED (Saudi Arabia)		MIA (United States)		CAT (Spain)		ZAN (Netherlands)		SIN (Singapore)		LUS (Qatar)		YMC (United Arab Emirates)			Points

Colour	Result
Gold	Winner
Silver	Second place
Bronze	Third place
Green	Points classification
Blue	Non-points classification
Blue	Non-classified finish (NC)
Purple	Retired, not classified (Ret)
Red	Did not qualify (DNQ)
Red	Did not pre-qualify (DNPQ)
Black	Disqualified (DSQ)
White	Did not start (DNS)
White	Withdrew (WD)
White	Race cancelled (C)
Blank	Did not practice (DNP)
Blank	Did not arrive (DNA)
Blank	Excluded (EX)

^{P} – Pole
^{F} – Fastest Lap
† — Did not finish, but classified
