= Sauber Academy =

Program to support young racing drivers through their careers

(Switzerland) Sauber Academy
- Founded: 2019 (as Sauber Junior Team)
- Founder(s): Sauber Motorsport AG
- Folded: 2025
- Base: Hinwil, Zürich, Switzerland
- Team principal(s): Beat Zehnder
- Noted drivers: (United States) Juan Manuel Correa (United Kingdom) Callum Ilott (Monaco) Arthur Leclerc (France) Théo Pourchaire (Switzerland) Fabio Scherer (Czech Republic) Roman Staněk (United States) Ugo Ugochukwu (Barbados) Zane Maloney

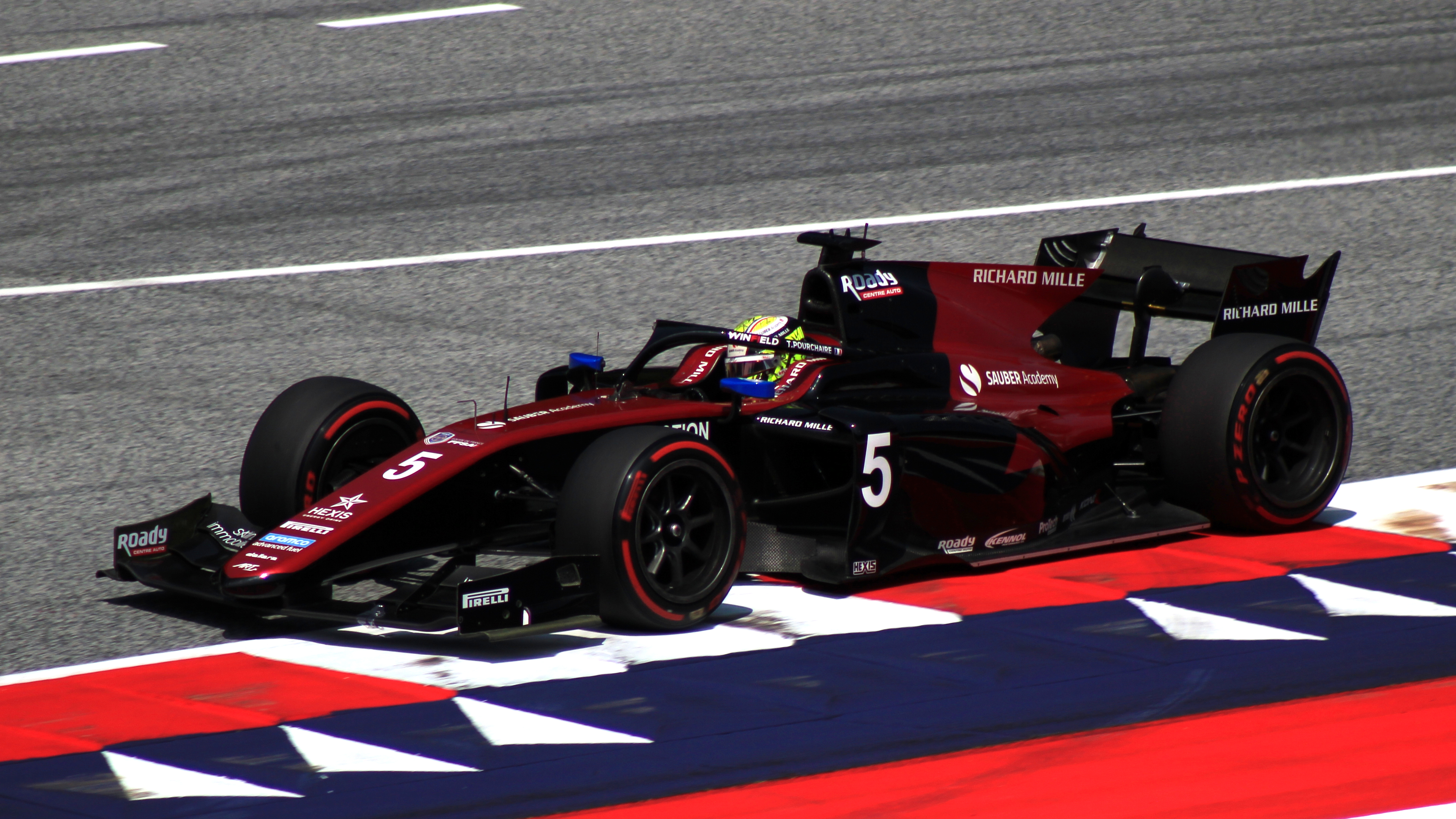
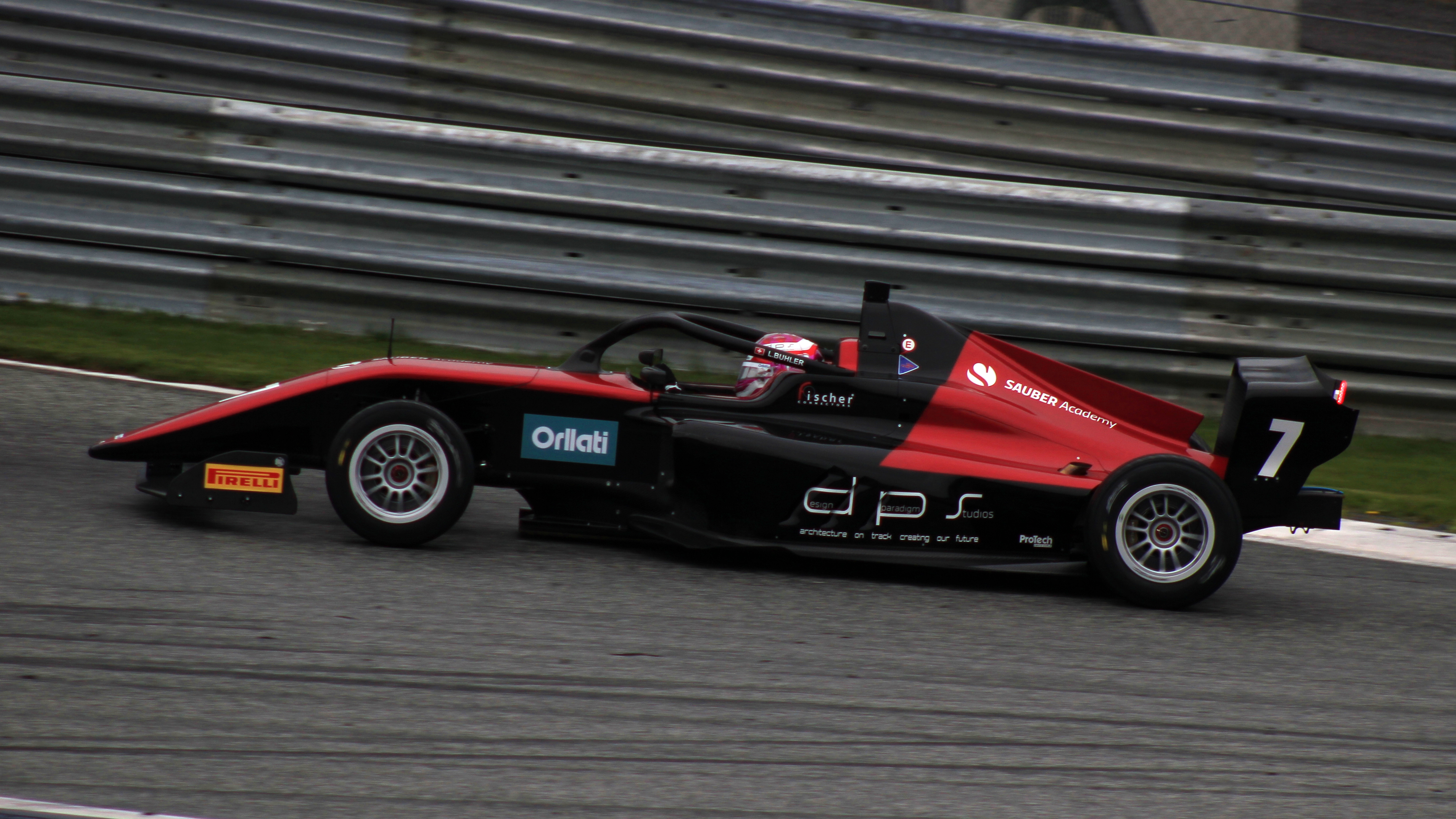
The Sauber Academy had its best ever season in 2023, as Théo Pourchaire (top) won Formula 2 and Léna Bühler (bottom) was F1 Academy runner-up.

The Sauber Academy, formerly known as the Sauber Junior Team, was a driver development programme by Sauber Motorsport to support drivers from karts through the feeder series ladder to promote them to their Formula One team.

In November 2018, Sauber entered a partnership with Czech team Charouz Racing System to form the Sauber Junior Team, followed by the creation of a karting team, aligned with Kart Republic, in March 2019. Sauber then parted ways with Charouz and rebranded the programme as the Sauber Academy for 2020.

After Audi took over Sauber's entry in 2026, the team launched its own driver academy, the Audi Driver Development Programme.

== Former drivers ==
=== Sauber Junior Team (2019) ===
Driver	Years	Series that driver competed as Sauber junior
(United States) Juan Manuel Correa	2019	FIA Formula 2 Championship (2019)
(France) Alessandro Ghiretti	2019	ADAC Formula 4 (2019)
(South Africa) Raoul Hyman	2019	FIA Formula 3 Championship (2019)
(United Kingdom) Callum Ilott (Note: In 2019 Ilott was part of both the Sauber Junior Team and the Ferrari Driver Academy.)	2019	FIA Formula 2 Championship (2019)
(Monaco) Arthur Leclerc	2019	ADAC Formula 4 (2019)
(France) Théo Pourchaire	2019	ADAC Formula 4 (2019)
(Switzerland) Fabio Scherer	2019	FIA Formula 3 Championship (2019)
(Czech Republic) Roman Staněk	2019	ADAC Formula 4 (2019); Italian F4 Championship (2019)
(Germany) Lirim Zendeli	2019	FIA Formula 3 Championship (2019)

=== Sauber Academy (2020–2025) ===
Driver	Years	Series that driver competed as Sauber junior
(Brazil) Emerson Fittipaldi Jr.	2020	Karting (2020)
(Czech Republic) Petr Ptáček	2020	Formula Renault Eurocup (2020)
(United Kingdom) Dexter Patterson	2020–2021	Karting (2020); Italian F4 Championship (2020); GB3 Championship (2021)
(France) Théo Pourchaire	2020–2024	FIA Formula 3 Championship (2020); FIA Formula 2 Championship (2020–2023); Super Formula (2024); IndyCar Series (2024)
(United States) Juan Manuel Correa	2021–2022	FIA Formula 3 Championship (2021–2022); FIA Formula 2 Championship (2022)
(Brazil) Roberto Faria	2022	GB3 Championship (2022)
(France) Marcus Amand	2023	Formula Regional European Championship (2023)
(Brazil) Miguel Costa	2023	Karting – OKJ (2023)
(Switzerland) Léna Bühler	2023–2024	Formula 4 UAE Championship (2023); F1 Academy (2023); Formula Regional European Championship (2024)
(Germany) Taym Saleh	2023–2024	Karting – OK (2021–2022)
(Barbados) Zane Maloney	2024	FIA Formula 2 Championship (2024)
(Germany) Carrie Schreiner	2024	Formula 4 UAE Championship (2024); Formula Winter Series (2024); F1 Academy (2024); F4 British Championship (2024); Nürburgring Langstrecken-Serie (2024)
(Austria) Emma Felbermayr	2025	F1 Academy (2025); F4 Spanish Championship (2025); F4 British Championship (2025)

== Sauber Karting Team ==
From 2019 to 2022, Sauber and kart manufacturer Kart Republic ran the Sauber Karting Team.

Driver	Years	Series that driver competed as Sauber junior
(Switzerland) Joshua Dufek	2019	Karting (2019)
(United Kingdom) Dexter Patterson	2019	Karting (2019)
(Singapore) Christian Ho	2019–2021	Karting (2019–2021)
(Poland) Piotr Czaja	2020	Karting (2020)
(United Kingdom) Harry Thompson	2020	Karting (2020)
(United States) Ugo Ugochukwu	2020–2021	Karting (2020–2021)
(Singapore) Tiziano Monza	2020–2021	Karting (2020–2021)
(Brazil) Miguel Costa	2020–2022	Karting – OKJ (2020–2022)
(United Kingdom) Sonny Smith	2021	Karting – OKJ (2021)
(Poland) Maciej Gładysz	2021	Karting – OKJ (2021)
(Poland) Gustaw Wiśniewski	2021	Karting – OKJ (2021)
(Philippines) Zachary David	2021–2022	Karting – OK (2021–2022)

== Sauber Affiliate drivers ==
In 2014, Sauber set up Sauber Affiliate drivers, an F1 preparation programme with the team, including on-track testing, simulator work, as well as mental and physical training, with the goal of gaining the FIA Super Licence required for F1 competition.

Driver	Years	Series that driver competed as Sauber Affiliate
(Switzerland) Simona de Silvestro	2014	None
