= Jessica Edgar =

English racing driver (born 2005)

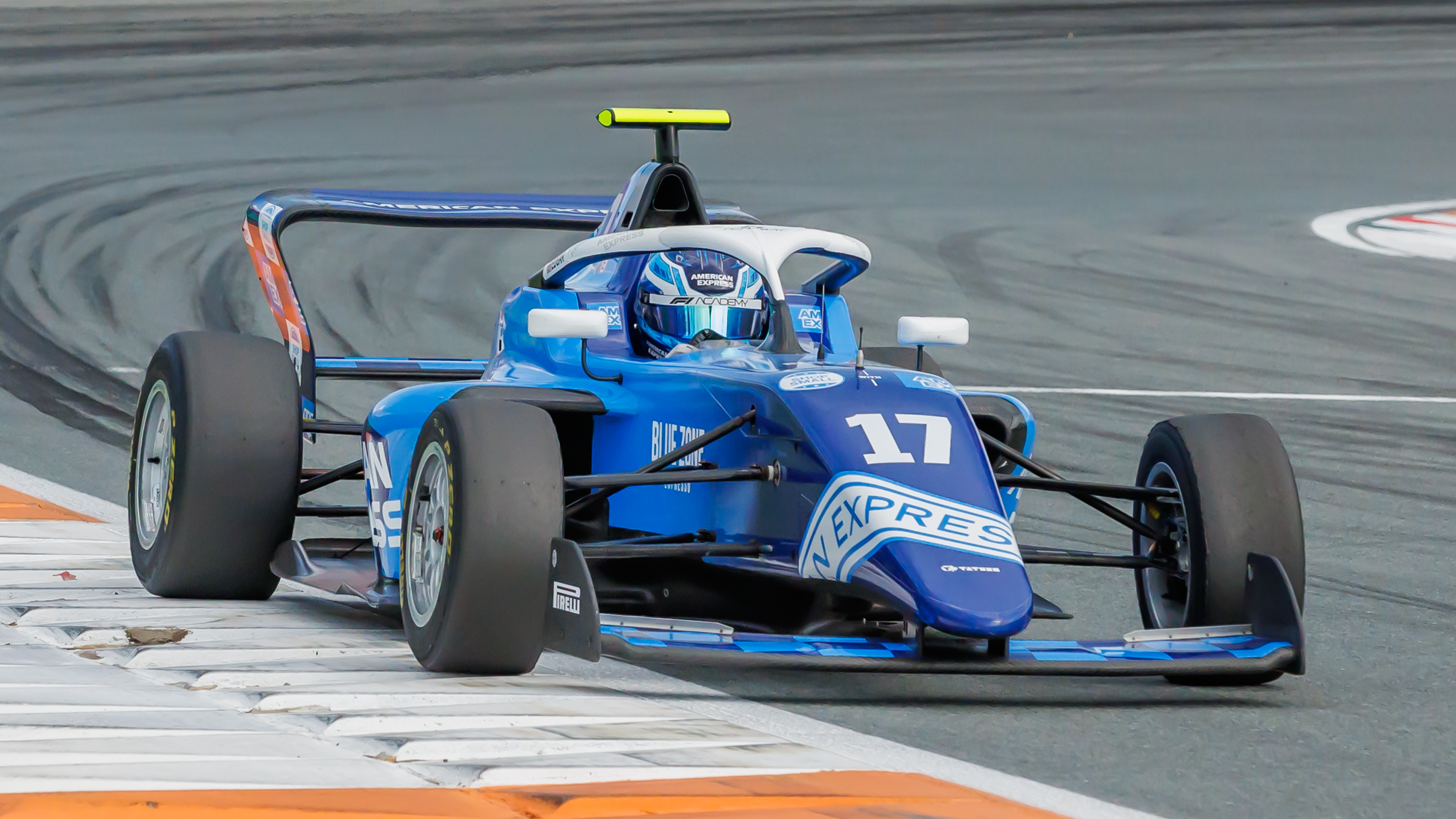
- Edgar at the 2024 Dutch Grand Prix
- Nationality: (United Kingdom) British
- Born: 15 March 2005 (age 21) Ennerdale and Kinniside, England
- Relatives: Jonny Edgar (cousin)

F1 Academy
- Categorisation: FIA Silver
- Years active: 2023–2024
- Teams: Rodin Carlin, Rodin Motorsport
- Car number: 17
- Starts: 35
- Wins: 1
- Podiums: 4
- Poles: 1
- Fastest laps: 1
- Best finish: 8th in 2023

Previous series
- 2023–2024; 2022: F1 Academy; GB4 Championship

Jessica "Jess" Edgar (born 15 March 2005) is a British racing driver. She currently competes in the KZ2 British Championship for Jade Racing Team.

== Career ==
=== Karting ===
Edgar started her racing career in karting in 2009. In 2013, she moved up to the Cadet category. In 2017, she became champion of the Cumbria Kart Racing Club in Rowrah. In 2018, she won several kart races in the Mini X30 category. In 2019, she came second in this category in the Motorsport UK Kartmasters Grand Prix and fourth in the British Kart Championship. Also that year, Edgar took part in the FIA Motorsport Games in the Karting Slalom Cup. She missed the 2020 season due to the COVID-19 pandemic, but returned to karting in 2021 and finished thirteenth in the X30 Junior category of the British championship that year. She also competed in the 2021 FIA Girls on Track - Rising Stars shooutout.

=== GB4 Championship ===
In 2022, Edgar made the switch to formula racing, where she competed for the team Fortec Motorsport in the new GB4 Championship. She achieved a podium finish at Oulton Park and managed to finish in the top-ten in most other races. With 269 points, she finished seventh in the final standings.

=== F1 Academy ===
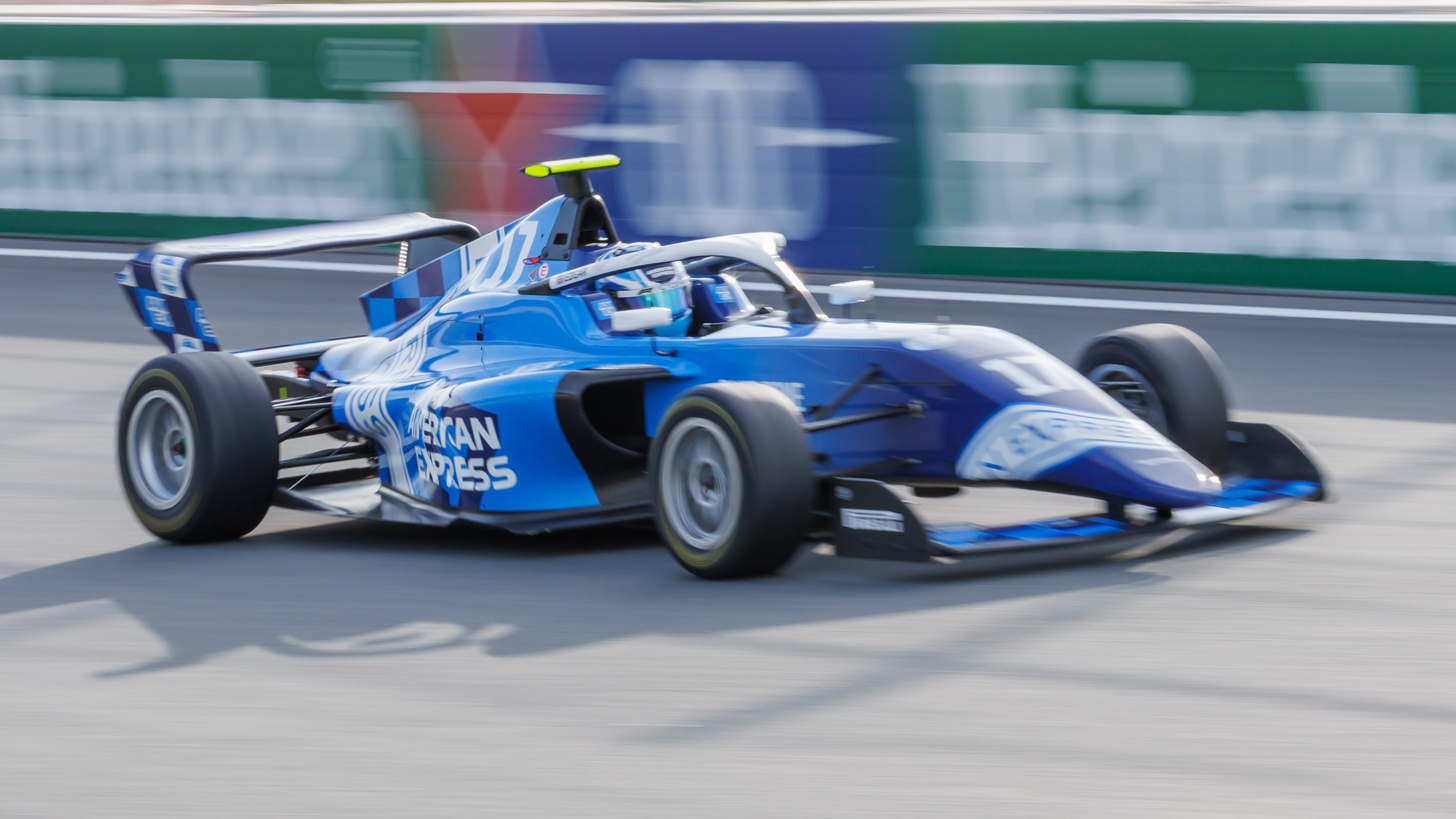
Edgar competing in an F1 Academy race at Zandvoort in 2024.

In 2023, Edgar switched to F1 Academy, a new class for women organized by Formula One, where she drove for Rodin Carlin. She earned four podiums and one win, to finish eighth in the standings. For 2024, she was retained by the team, now renamed as Rodin Motorsport, with support from American Express.

=== Formula E ===
In October 2025, Edgar sampled Formula E machinery with DS Penske during the all-women test at the Circuit Ricardo Tormo, where she finished both the morning and afternoon sessions in 12th.

== Karting record ==
=== Karting career summary ===
Season	Series	Team	Position
2019	British Kart Championship - X30 Mini	Fusion Motorsport	4th
2019	Motorsport UK Kartmasters Grand Prix - X30 Mini	Fusion Motorsport	2nd
2019	IAME International Final - X30 Junior		
2019	FIA Motorsport Games Karting Slalom Cup	Team UK	23rd
2020	Kartmasters British GP - X30 Junior	Fusion Motorsport	22nd
2021	LGM Series - Junior X30	Fusion Motorsport	4th
2021	British Kart Championship - X30 Junior	Fusion Motorsport	13th
2025	British Kart Championship - KZ2	Jade Racing Team	10th
2026	British Kart Championship - KZ2	Jade Racing Team	4th

== Racing record ==
=== Racing career summary ===
Season	Series	Team	Races	Wins	Poles	F/Laps	Podiums	Points	Position
2022	GB4 Championship	Fortec Motorsport	24	0	0	0	1	269	7th
2023	F1 Academy	Rodin Carlin	21	1	1	1	4	114	8th
2023	Formula 4 UAE Championship - Trophy Round	Rodin Carlin	2	0	0	0	0	N/A	NC
2024	F1 Academy	Rodin Motorsport	14	0	0	0	0	28	13th
2024	F4 British Championship	Chris Dittmann Racing	3	0	0	0	0	8	28th

=== Complete GB4 Championship results ===
(key) (Races in bold indicate pole position; races in italics indicate fastest lap)

Year	Team	1	2	3	4	5	6	7	8	9	10	11	12	13	14	15	16	17	18	19	20	21	22	23	24	DC	Points
2022	Fortec Motorsport	SNE1; 1; 9	SNE1; 2; 9	SNE1; 3; 10	OUL; 1; 10	OUL; 2; 12	OUL; 3; 2	SIL1; 1; 11	SIL1; 2; 10	SIL1; 3; 10	DON1; 1; 11	DON1; 2; 12	DON1; 3; 10	SNE2; 1; 9	SNE2; 2; 8	SNE2; 3; 9	SIL2; 1; 4	SIL2; 2; 8	SIL2; 3; 9	BRH; 1; 5	BRH; 2; 5	BRH; 3; 7	DON2; 1; 13	DON2; 2; 8	DON2; 3; 7	7th	269

=== Complete F1 Academy results ===
(key) (Races in bold indicate pole position; races in italics indicate fastest lap)

Year	Team	1	2	3	4	5	6	7	8	9	10	11	12	13	14	15	16	17	18	19	20	21	DC	Points
2023	Rodin Carlin	RBR; 1; 3	RBR; 2; 11	RBR; 3; 8	CRT; 1; 9	CRT; 2; 9	CRT; 3; 9	CAT; 1; 10	CAT; 2; 12	CAT; 3; 14	ZAN; 1; 4	ZAN; 2; 4	ZAN; 3; 12	MNZ; 1; 3	MNZ; 2; 5	MNZ; 3; 8	LEC; 1; 15	LEC; 2; 8	LEC; 3; 6	COA; 1; 5	COA; 2; 3	**COA**; **3**; 1	8th	114
2024	Rodin Motorsport	JED; 1; 15	JED; 2; 4	MIA; 1; 7	MIA; 2; 14	CAT; 1; 8	CAT; 2; 15	ZAN; 1; 12	ZAN; 2; 16	SIN; 1; 13	SIN; 2; 15	LSL; 1; 7	LSL; 2 C	YMC; 1; 16	YMC; 2 Ret	YMC; 3; 12							13th	28

=== Complete F4 British Championship results ===
(key) (Races in bold indicate pole position; races in italics indicate fastest lap)

Year	Team	1	2	3	4	5	6	7	8	9	10	11	12	13	14	15	16	17	18	19	20	21	22	23	24	25	26	27	28	29	30	31	32	DC	Points
2024	Chris Dittmann Racing	DPN; 1	DPN; 2	DPN; 3	BHI; 1	BHI; 2	BHI; 3	SNE; 1	SNE; 2	SNE; 3	THR; 1	THR; 2	THR; 3	SILGP; 1	SILGP; 2	SILGP; 3	ZAN; 1; 15	ZAN; 2; 14	ZAN; 3; 15	KNO; 1	KNO; 2	KNO; 3	DPGP; 1	DPGP; 2	DPGP; 3	DPGP; 4	SILN; 1	SILN; 2	SILN; 3	BHGP; 1	BHGP; 2	BHGP; 3	BHGP; 4	28th	8

== Personal life ==
Edgar is the cousin of racing driver Jonny Edgar. They are part of the fourth generation of Edgars to practice motor racing. She lives in Ennerdale, Cumbria, and attended Keswick School.
