= Léna Bühler =

Swiss racing driver

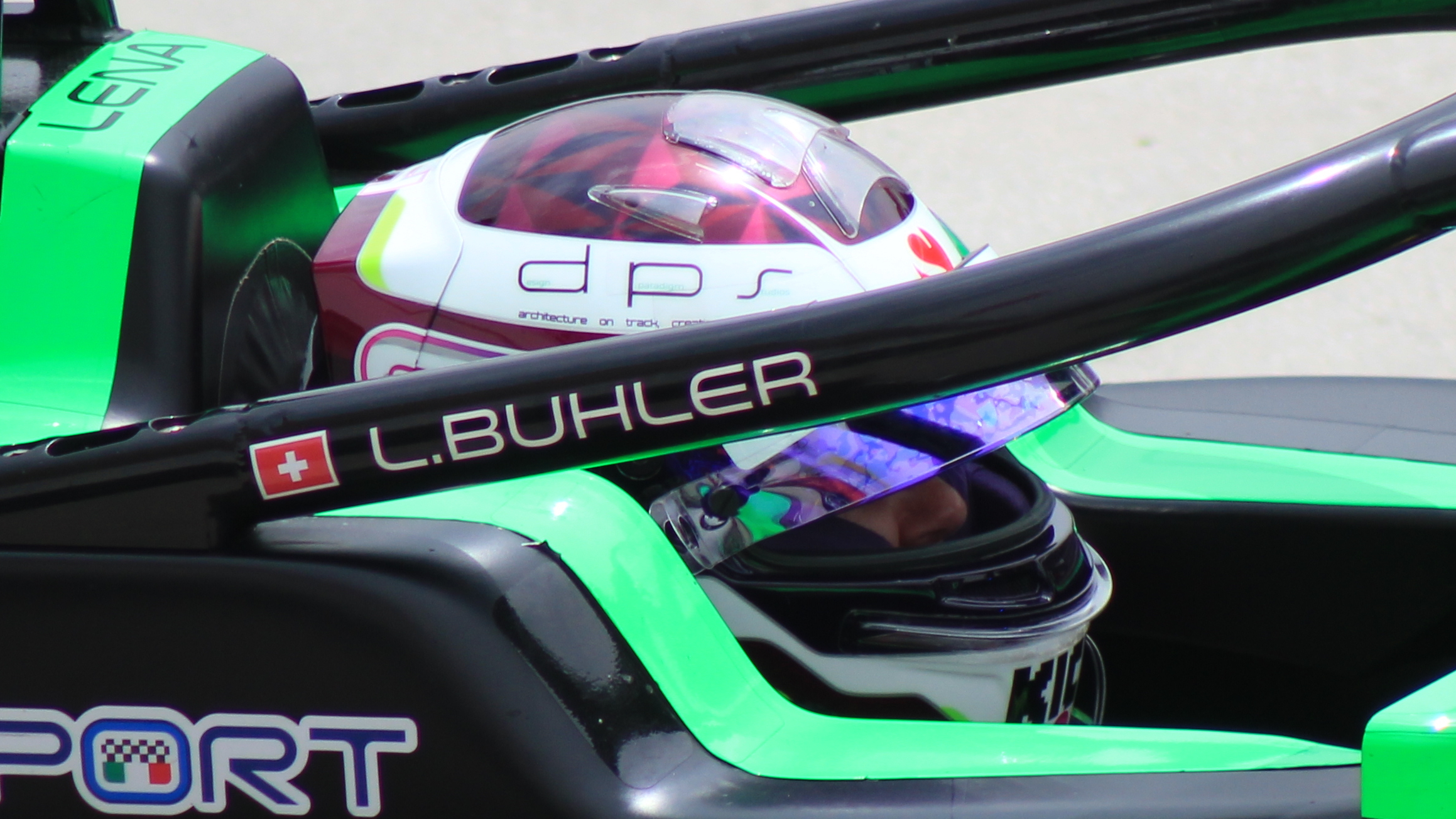
- Léna Bühler at the Hungaroring in 2024
- Nationality: (Switzerland) Swiss
- Born: 9 July 1997 (age 29) Valeyres-sous-Montagny, Switzerland

Le Mans Cup career
- Debut season: 2025
- Current team: R-ace GP
- Categorisation: FIA Silver
- Car number: 86
- Former teams: 23Events Racing
- Starts: 9
- Wins: 1
- Podiums: 2
- Poles: 1
- Fastest laps: 0
- Best finish: 7th in 2025 (LMP3)

Previous series
- 2021–22, 2024 2023 2023 2022 2020: Formula Regional European Championship; F1 Academy; Formula 4 UAE Championship; FR Asian Championship; F4 Spanish Championship

Léna Bühler (German pronunciation: [ˈleːna ˈbyːlɐ]; born 9 July 1997) is a Swiss racing driver who currently competes in the Le Mans Cup for R-ace GP in LMP3. She previously drove for 23Events Racing and won the 2025 Road to Le Mans. In single-seaters, Bühler was a Sauber junior and the 2023 F1 Academy runner-up.

== Junior career ==
=== Karting ===
Having competed in BMX at European level in her childhood, Bühler took up racing at the relatively late age of 17. She made her karting debut in the Swiss Karting Championship in 2017, where she finished 14th. She raced karts for the next two years, finishing fourth and third in the Swiss Championship in 2018 and 2019 respectively.

=== Lower formulae ===
Bühler made her car racing debut in the 2020 F4 Spanish Championship with Drivex School. She starred in qualifying on occasion, most notably making the front row at the Circuito del Jarama, but could only manage a best race finish of fifth. She scored 23 points and finished the season 15th in the standings, as the tenth-highest rookie.

=== Formula Regional ===
==== 2021 ====
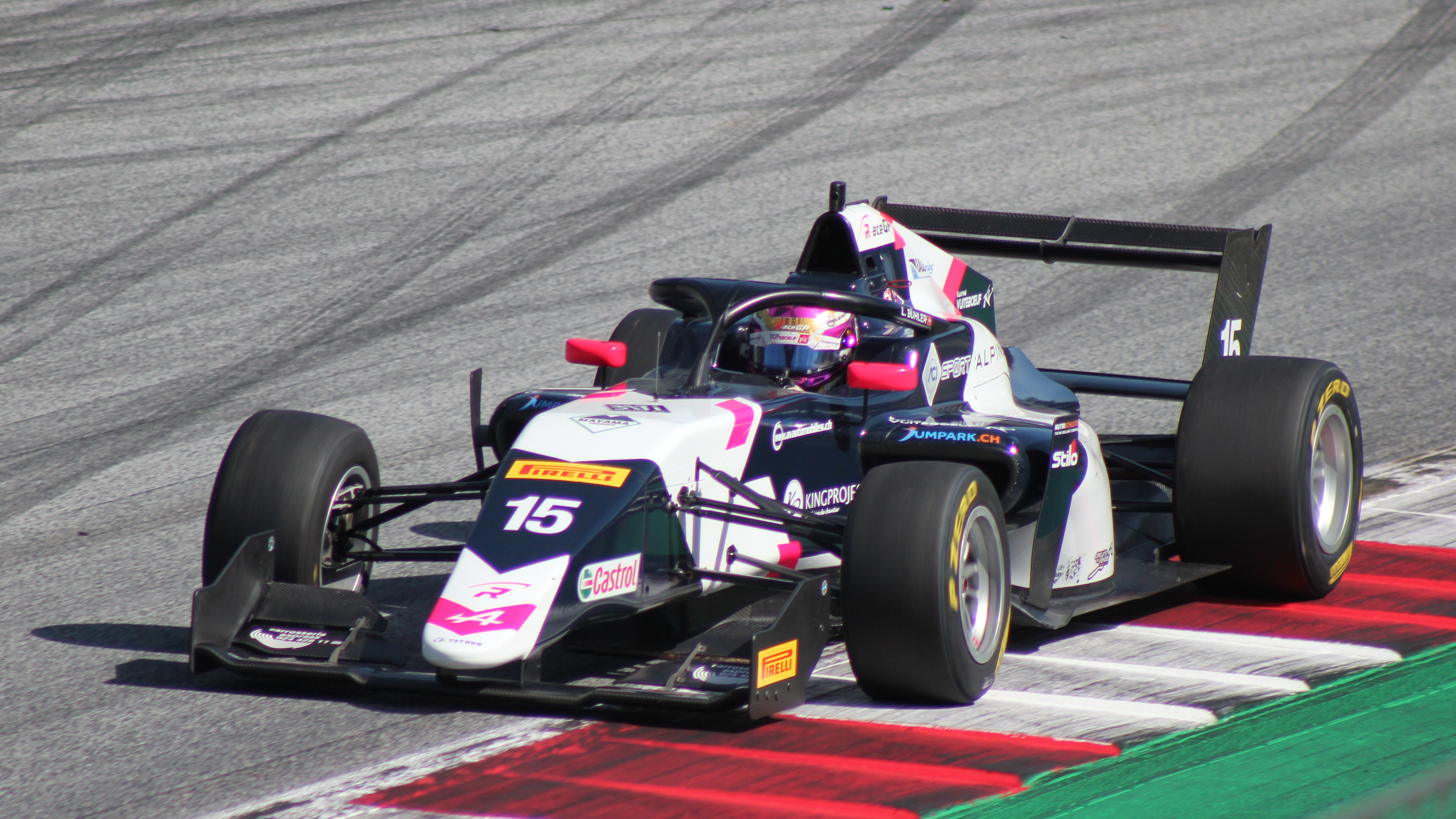
Bühler made her FRECA debut in 2021 for R-ace GP.

In February 2021 it was announced that Bühler would partner Hadrien David, Isack Hadjar and Zane Maloney at R-ace GP in the Formula Regional European Championship, as the first female entrant of the rebranded series. However, she injured her hand in a pre-season test and could not attend the opening round. After making her debut at the second round in Barcelona, Bühler endured a very difficult season, achieving a best finish of 20th and coming 38th in the standings, last of all the full-time drivers. She later admitted that she had struggled a lot physically as a result of the injury, stating that she "lacked a little strength, resistance over the duration of the races".

==== 2022 ====
Bühler remained with the team for the 2022 season, where she was entered into the first six races but was only classified in race one at Monaco. She also raced part-time in the Formula Regional Asian Championship during the winter, with a best result of 12th at the final round in Abu Dhabi.

=== F1 Academy ===
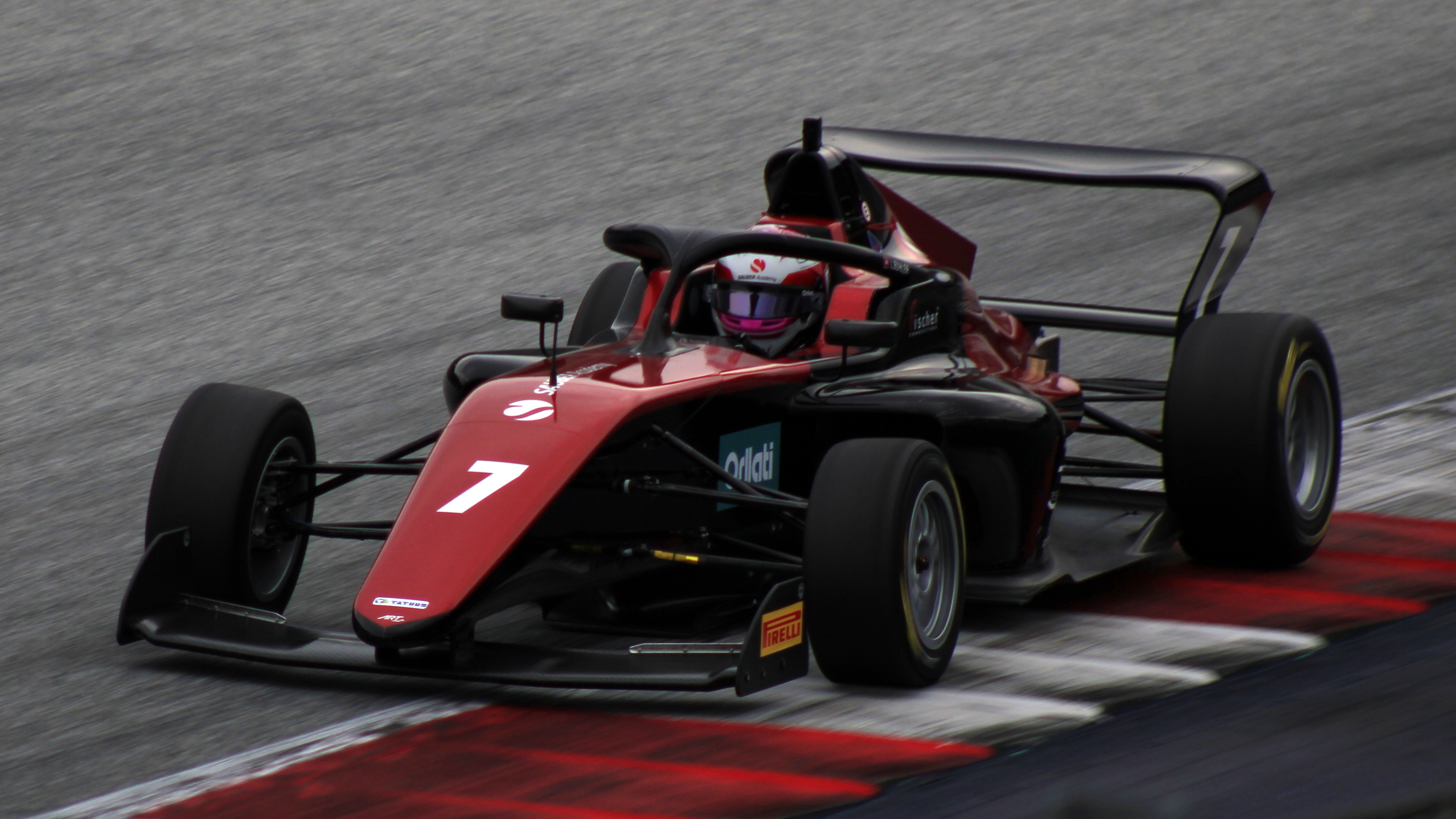
Bühler was runner-up in her only F1 Academy season (2023) for ART GP.

On 2 February 2023, Bühler was confirmed to be the first driver to compete in the newly launched all-female F1 Academy series, racing for ART Grand Prix in 2023. She also joined the Sauber Academy. She finished the season as the vice-champion, with two wins and 13 podiums.

=== Return to Formula Regional ===
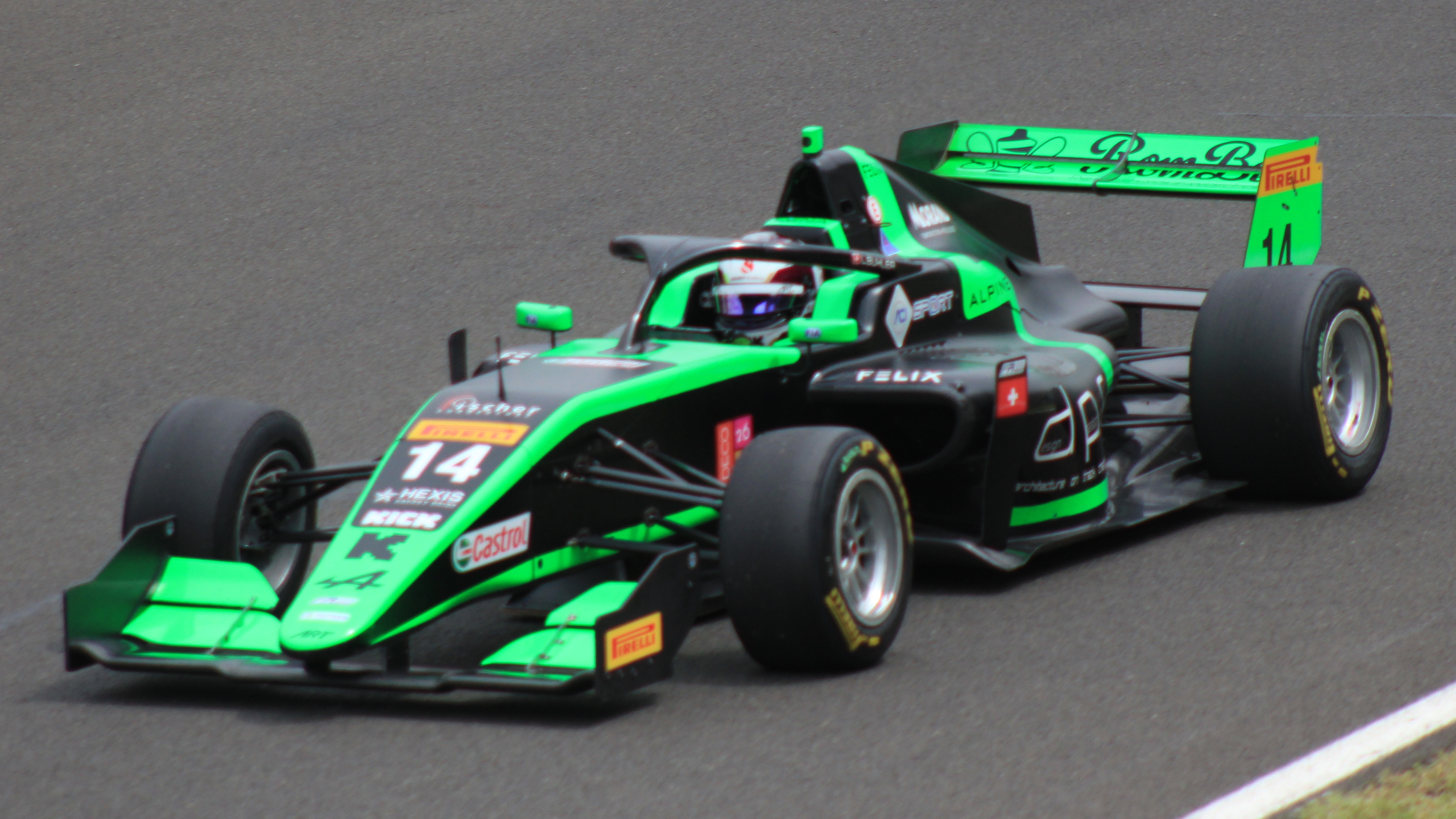
Bühler driving her Sauber-liveried Formula Regional car in 2024

Bühler returned to the Formula Regional European Championship for 2024 with ART Grand Prix. She scored her best finish of 22nd in race 2 at Paul Ricard. On September 4, Bühler announced she would not be competing in the final four rounds of the season.

== Formula E ==
In November 2024, Bühler drove for Mahindra Racing in the 2024–25 Formula E pre-season women's test at Jarama. She placed fifth in the test.

== Sportscar racing career ==
=== Le Mans Cup ===
==== 2025 ====
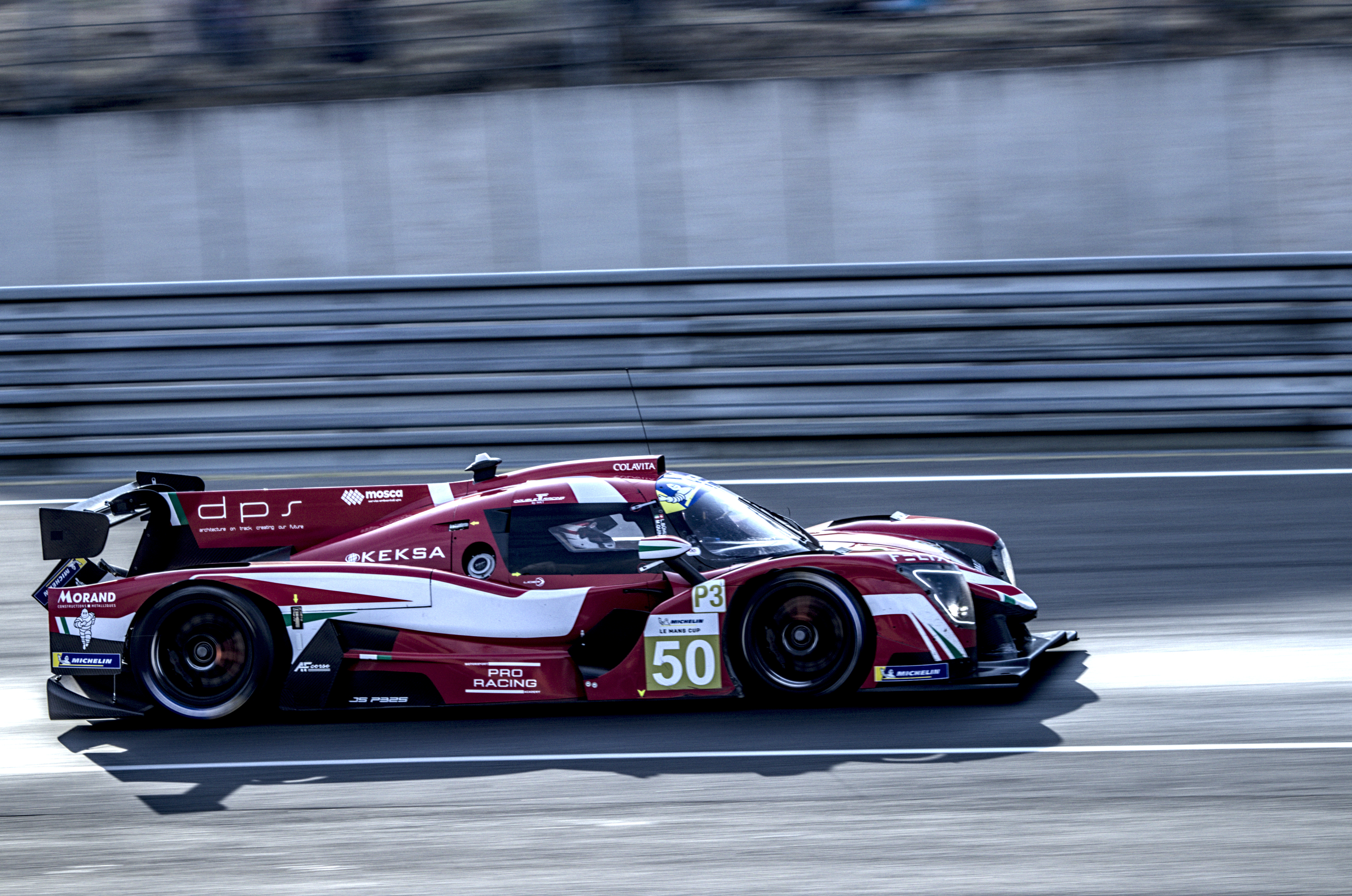
Bühler won the 2025 Road to Le Mans on her debut LMP3 season.

Bühler switched to prototypes for 2025, signing with AF Corse–backed 23Events Racing to drive a Ligier JS P325 in the LMP3 class of Michelin Le Mans Cup. Joining her as a teammate in the No. 50 was Matteo Quintarelli. Quintarelli took pole on debut at Barcelona, before Bühler led a recovery drive to fifth after she was spun by R-ace GP's Hugo Schwarze at turn one. A defensive display against Schwarze then yielded the team its first win in race two of Road to Le Mans, which saw Bühler make history as the first woman to win overall in Le Mans Cup. The pair went on to score points in all races and finished seventh in the LMP3 standings. At the post-season ELMS rookie test at Portimão, Bühler was invited by AF Corse to sample a Ferrari 296 GT3.

==== 2026 ====
In 2026, Bühler reunited with R-ace GP to share one of its title-defending Duqueine D09 LMP3s, the No. 86, with Zack Scoular. The crew started the Le Mans Cup season with third place at Barcelona, rounding off the podium behind the No. 85 sister car and the No. 50 of Bühler's former team 23Events. That proved to be the high point of their season however, as several issues, including rear wing failures at both Paul Ricard and Le Mans, limited Bühler and Scoular to 13th overall.

== Karting record ==
=== Karting career summary ===
Season	Series	Team	Position
2017	Schweizer Kart Meisterschaft — X30 Challenge	GS Karting	14th
2018	IAME International Final — X30 Super	Spirit Racing	22nd
2018	Schweizer Kart Meisterschaft — X30 Challenge	Spirit Racing	4th
2019	IAME Series Benelux — X30 Senior		107th
2019	Schweizer Kart Meisterschaft — X30 Challenge	Spirit-Racing.ch	3rd
2019	IAME Euro Series — X30 Senior	Spirit-Racing.ch	DNF
2019	IAME Winter Cup — X30 Senior	Spirit-Racing.ch	DNF
2019	South Garda Winter Cup — OK		DNF

== Racing record ==
=== Racing career summary ===
Season	Series	Team	Races	Wins	Poles	F/Laps	Podiums	Points	Position
2020	F4 Spanish Championship	Drivex School	20	0	0	0	0	23	15th
2021	Formula Regional European Championship	R-ace GP	17	0	0	0	0	0	38th
2022	Formula Regional Asian Championship	3Y Technology by R-ace GP	6	0	0	0	0	0	29th
2022	Formula Regional European Championship	R-ace GP	3	0	0	0	0	0	39th
2023	Formula 4 UAE Championship	R2Race Cavicel	15	0	0	0	0	0	33rd
2023	F1 Academy	ART Grand Prix	21	2	2	1	13	222	**2nd**
2024	Formula Regional European Championship	ART Grand Prix	11	0	0	0	0	0	38th
2025	Le Mans Cup - LMP3	23Events Racing	7	1	1	0	1	55	7th
2025-26	Asian Le Mans Series - LMP3	R-ace GP	2	0	0	0	0	0	21st
2026	Le Mans Cup - LMP3	R-ace GP	6	0	0	0	1	19	13th

* Season still in progress.

=== Complete F4 Spanish Championship results ===
(key) (Races in bold indicate pole position) (Races in italics indicate fastest lap)

Year	Team	1	2	3	4	5	6	7	8	9	10	11	12	13	14	15	16	17	18	19	20	21	DC	Points
2020	Drivex School	NAV; 1; 12	NAV; 2; 8	NAV; 3; 8	LEC; 1 Ret	LEC; 2; 13	LEC; 3; 17	JER; 1 Ret	JER; 2; 8	JER; 3; 14	CRT; 1; 18	CRT; 2; 15	CRT; 3; 16	ARA; 1 Ret	ARA; 2; 15	ARA; 3; 5	JAR; 1; 16†	JAR; 2 DNS	JAR; 3 Ret	CAT; 1; 10	CAT; 2; 5	CAT; 3; 12	15th	23

=== Complete Formula Regional European Championship results ===
(key) (Races in bold indicate pole position) (Races in italics indicate fastest lap)

Year	Team	1	2	3	4	5	6	7	8	9	10	11	12	13	14	15	16	17	18	19	20	DC	Points
2021	R-ace GP	IMO; 1	IMO; 2	CAT; 1; 25	CAT; 2; 27	MCO; 1; 20	MCO; 2 DNQ	LEC; 1; 29	LEC; 2; 30	ZAN; 1; 24	ZAN; 2; 30	SPA; 1; 27	SPA; 2; 27	RBR; 1 Ret	RBR; 2; 26	VAL; 1; 30	VAL; 2; 25	MUG; 1; 29	MUG; 2; 32	MNZ; 1; 30	MNZ; 2; 23	38th	0
2022	R-ace GP	MNZ; 1 Ret	MNZ; 2 Ret	IMO; 1 WD	IMO; 2 WD	MCO; 1; 26	MCO; 2 DNQ	LEC; 1	LEC; 2	ZAN; 1	ZAN; 2	HUN; 1	HUN; 2	SPA; 1	SPA; 2	RBR; 1	RBR; 2	CAT; 1	CAT; 2	MUG; 1	MUG; 2	39th	0
2024	ART Grand Prix	HOC; 1; 26	HOC; 2 Ret	SPA; 1; 27	SPA; 2; 25	ZAN; 1; 27	ZAN; 2; 26	HUN; 1 Ret	HUN; 2; 25	MUG; 1 Ret	MUG; 2; 28	LEC; 1 DNS	LEC; 2; 22	IMO; 1	IMO; 2	RBR; 1	RBR; 2	CAT; 1	CAT; 2	MNZ; 1	MNZ; 2	38th	0

=== Complete Formula Regional Asian Championship results ===
(key) (Races in bold indicate pole position) (Races in italics indicate the fastest lap of top ten finishers)

Year	Entrant	1	2	3	4	5	6	7	8	9	10	11	12	13	14	15	DC	Points
2022	3Y Technology by R-ace GP	ABU; 1	ABU; 2	ABU; 3	DUB; 1	DUB; 2	DUB; 3	DUB; 1	DUB; 2	DUB; 3	DUB; 1; 26†	DUB; 2; 18	DUB; 3; 15	ABU; 1; 15	ABU; 2; 12	ABU; 3 Ret	29th	0

=== Complete Formula 4 UAE Championship results ===
(key) (Races in bold indicate pole position) (Races in italics indicate fastest lap)

Year	Team	1	2	3	4	5	6	7	8	9	10	11	12	13	14	15	Pos	Points
2023	R2Race	DUB1; 1; 21	DUB1; 2; 34	DUB1; 3; 23	KMT1; 1 Ret	KMT1; 2 Ret	KMT1; 3 Ret	KMT2; 1; 24	KMT2; 2; 31	KMT2; 3; 16	DUB2; 1; 16	DUB2; 2; 15	DUB2; 3; 32	YMC; 1; 27	YMC; 2; 17	YMC; 3; 17	33rd	0

=== Complete F1 Academy results ===
(key) (Races in bold indicate pole position; races in italics indicate fastest lap)

Year	Team	1	2	3	4	5	6	7	8	9	10	11	12	13	14	15	16	17	18	19	20	21	DC	Points
2023	ART Grand Prix	RBR; 1 Ret	RBR; 2; 2	RBR; 3; 6	CRT; 1; 3	CRT; 2; 2	CRT; 3; 4	CAT; 1 Ret	CAT; 2; 4	**CAT**; **3**; 1	ZAN; 1; 2	ZAN; 2; 3	ZAN; 3; 3	MNZ; 1; 2	MNZ; 2; 1	MNZ; 3; 10	LEC; 1; 4	LEC; 2; 2	**LEC**; **3**; 2	COA; 1; 3	COA; 2; 2	COA; 3; 4	2nd	222

=== Complete Le Mans Cup results ===
(key) (Races in bold indicate pole position; results in italics indicate fastest lap)

Year	Entrant	Class	Chassis	1	2	3	4	5	6	7	Rank	Points
2025	23Events Racing	LMP3	Ligier JS P325	**CAT**; 5	LEC; 9	LMS; 1; 7	LMS; 2; 1	SPA; 5	SIL; 5	ALG; 9	7th	55
2026	R-ace GP	LMP3	Duqueine D09	BAR; 3	LEC; Ret	LMS; 13	SPA; 14	SIL; 8	POR; 17		13th	19
