= Tatuus F4-T421 =

Italian race car

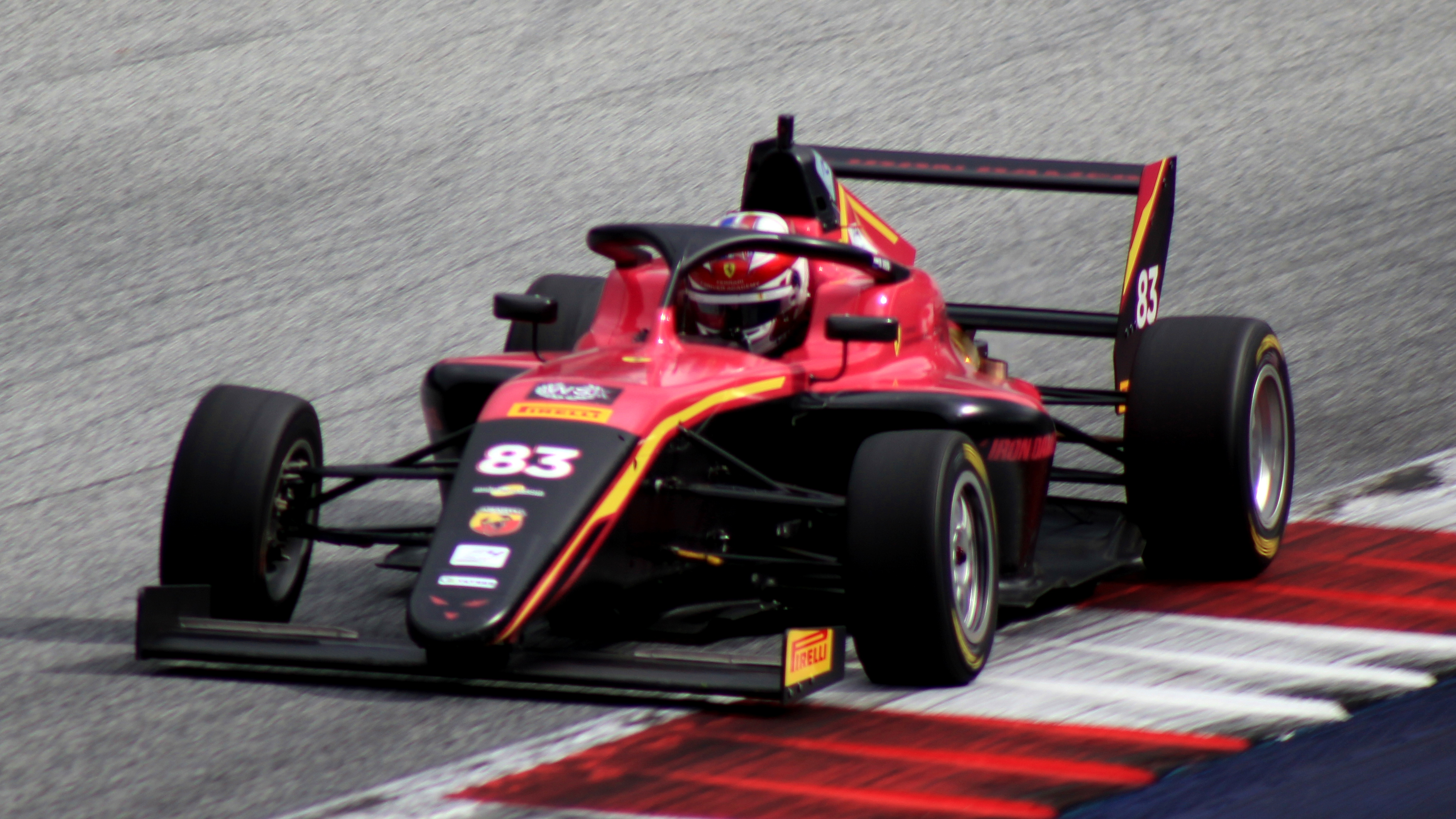
- Maya Weug drives a Tatuus F4-T421 at the Red Bull Ring
- Constructor: Tatuus
- Predecessor: Tatuus F4-T014

Technical specifications
- Chassis: Carbon-fiber monocoque, fiberglass body
- Suspension (front): Push-rod with twin non-adjustable shock absorbers, adjustable anti-roll bar and third element
- Suspension (rear): Push-rod with twin non-adjustable shock absorbers, adjustable anti-roll bar and third element
- Height: 950 mm (37 in)
- Axle track: 1,510 mm (59 in) (front); 1,460 mm (57 in) (rear)
- Wheelbase: 2,750 mm (108 in)
- Engine: Abarth FT-J/Autotecnica 1,368 cc (83 cu in) DOHC inline-4 turbocharged, longitudinally mounted in a mid-engined, rear-wheel drive layout
- Transmission: Sadev SLR75-14 6-speed semi-automatic sequential gearbox
- Power: 180–185 hp (134–138 kW)
- Weight: 570 kg (1,257 lb) including driver
- Fuel: Various unleaded control fuel
- Lubricants: Various
- Brakes: 4-piston aluminum calipers with ventilated brake discs
- Tyres: Various

Competition history
- Debut: 2021

The Tatuus F4-T421 is an open-wheel formula race car, designed, developed and built by Italian manufacturer Tatuus, for the second generation of Formula 4, since 2021.

== History ==
In January 2021, it was announced that the car would go into production to make its competitive debut in the 2022 Formula 4 UAE Championship, as the successor of the Tatuus F4-T014, featuring the introduction of the halo and other improved safety features. Over the course of 2021, many Formula 4 championships announced their intent to use the car in the 2022 season: the Italian F4 Championship, F4 British Championship, F4 Spanish Championship, Formula 4 UAE Championship, F4 Brazilian Championship, ACCR Formula 4 Championship and ADAC Formula 4.

The car first began testing in September 2021. The car made its competition debut in the 2022 Formula 4 UAE Championship, and featured in the 2022 seasons of all announced championships excluding the ACCR Formula 4 Championship, which was postponed due to global supply chain issues.

== Championships ==
Year introduced	Country	Championship	Season introduced
2022	Italy	Italian F4 Championship	2022
2022	Germany	ADAC Formula 4	2022
2022	Spain	F4 Spanish Championship	2022
2022	United Kingdom	F4 British Championship	2022
2022	United Arab Emirates	F4 UAE Championship	2022
2022	Brazil	F4 Brazilian Championship	2022
2023	Austria; Czech Republic; Hungary; Slovakia	Formula 4 CEZ Championship	2023
2023	Spain	Formula Winter Series	2023
2023	International	F1 Academy	2023
2023	China (Federation of Malaya) Malaysia	Formula 4 South East Asia Championship	2023
2024	Saudi Arabia	F4 Saudi Arabian Championship	2024
2024	Australia	Formula 4 Australian Championship	2024
2024	Mexico	NACAM Formula 4 Championship	2024
