= 2023 F1 Academy season =

Motor racing championship

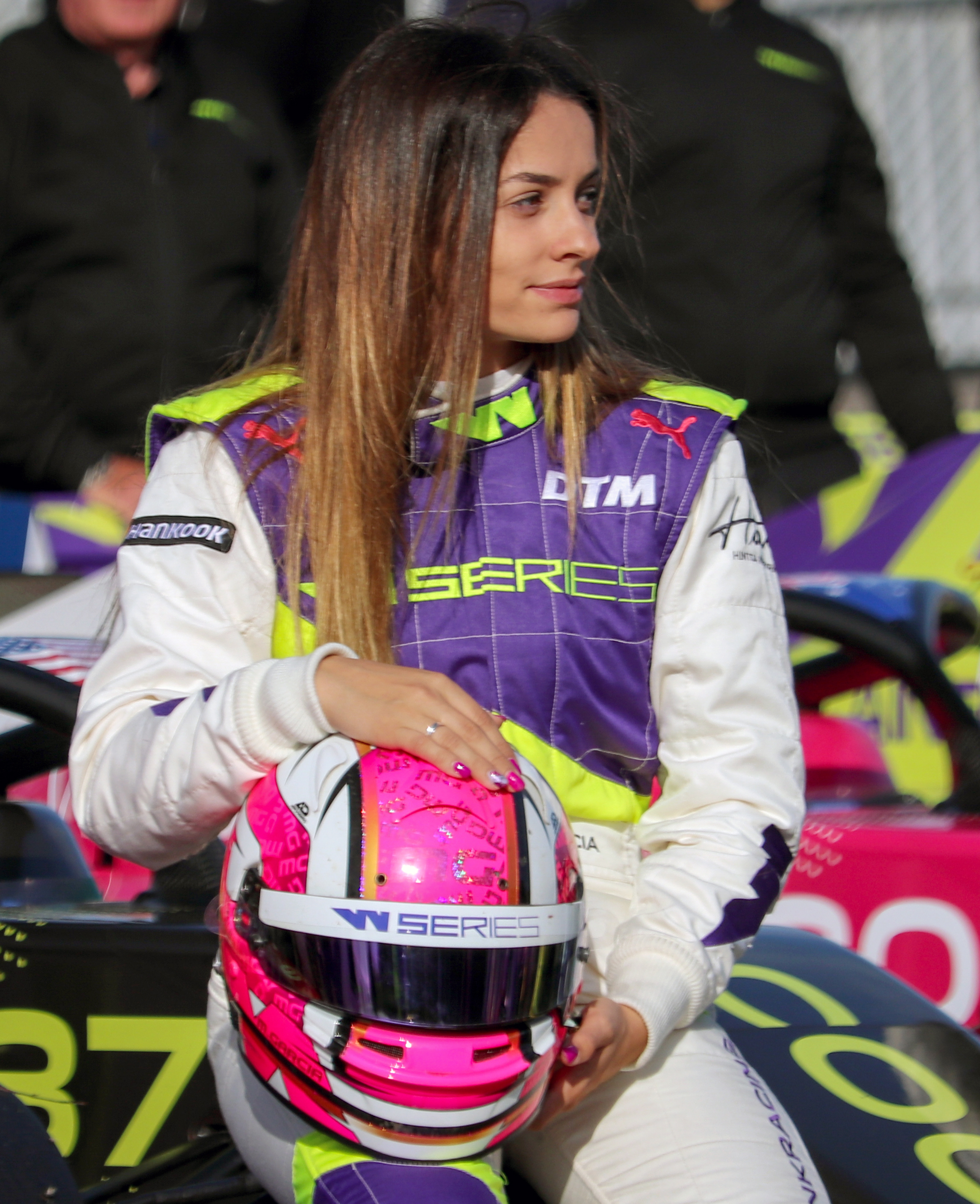
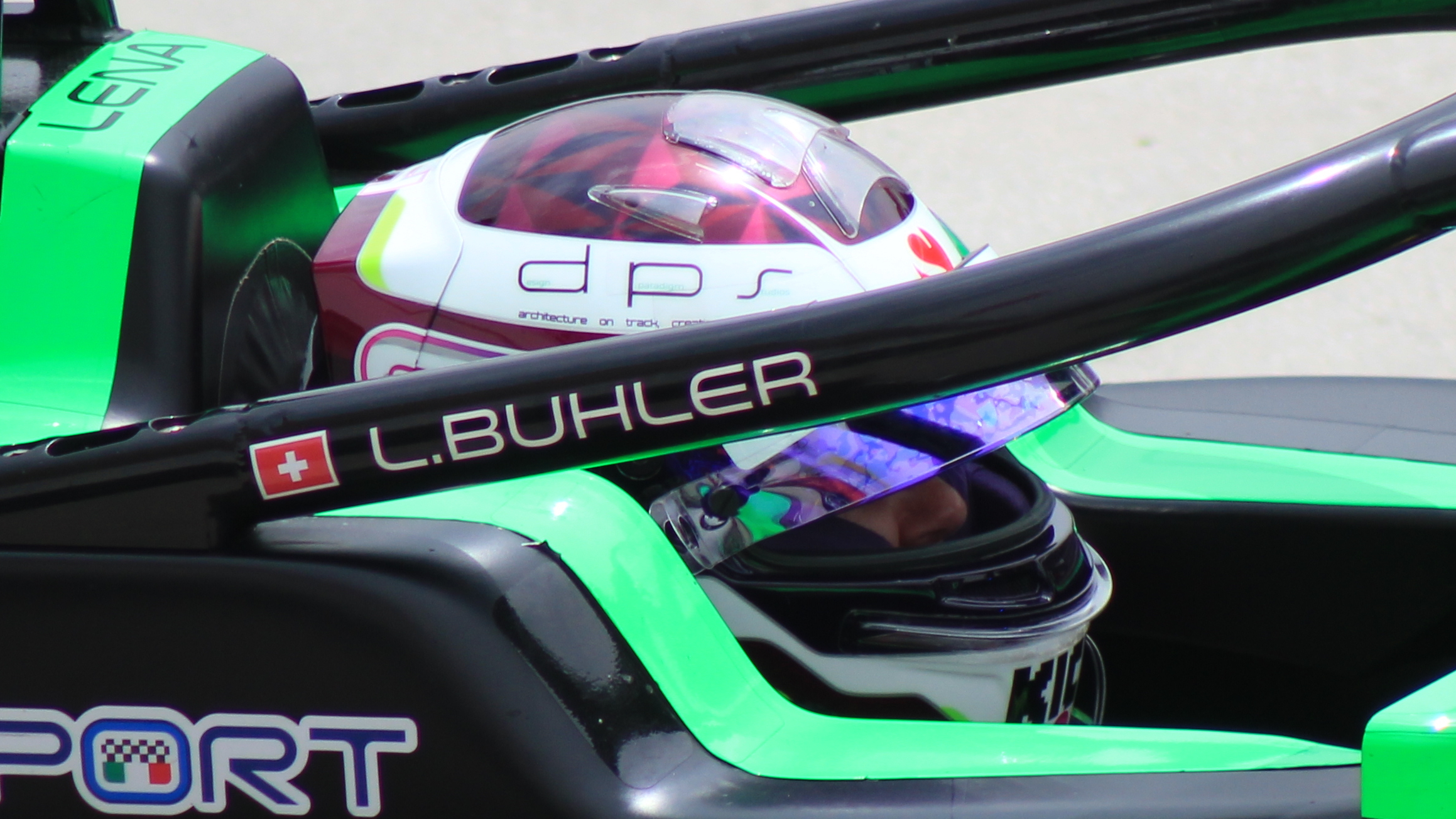
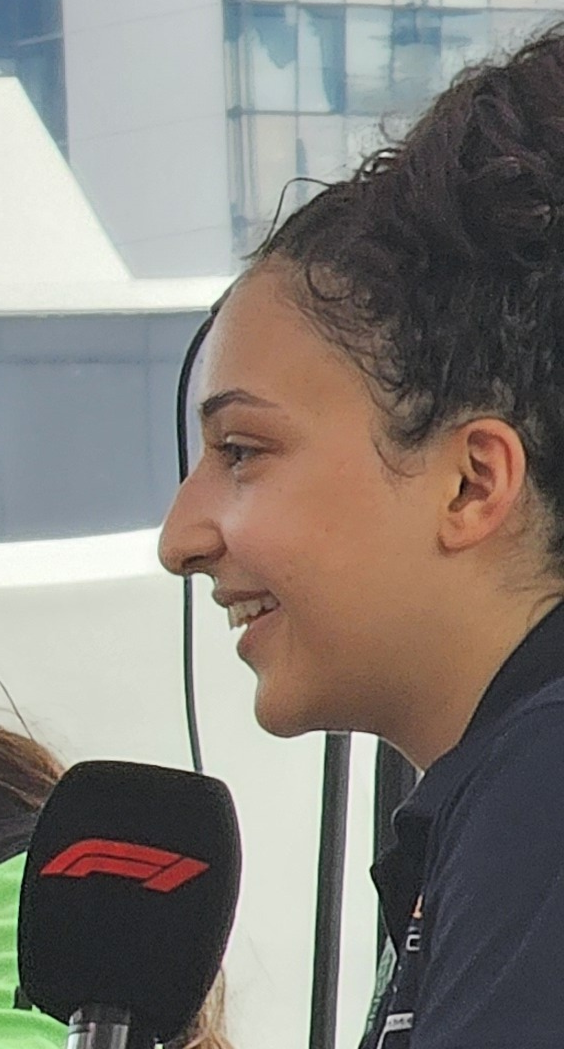
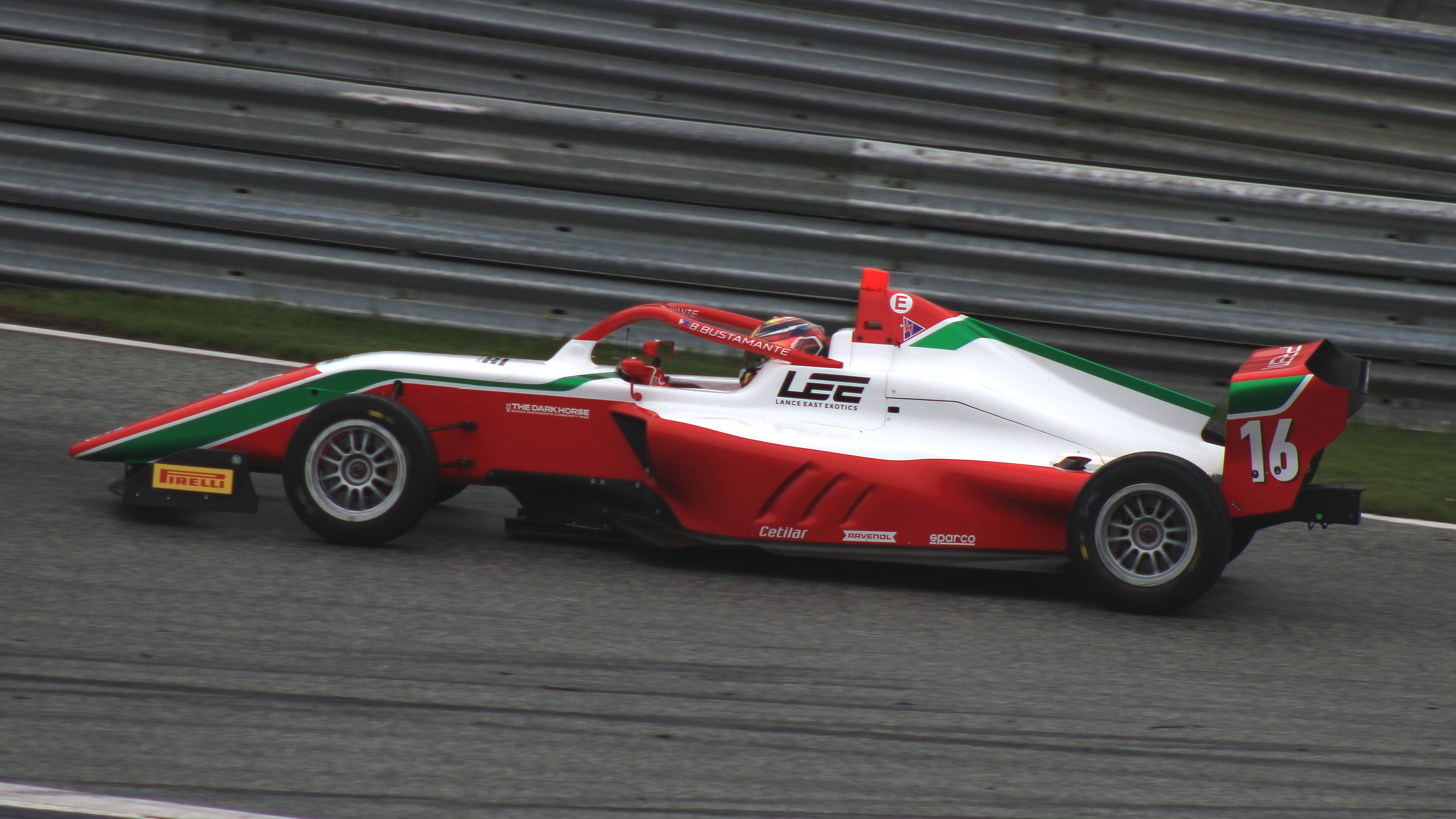
Marta García won the drivers' championship driving for Prema Racing. Léna Bühler (middle left) ended the season as runner-up, while Hamda Al Qubaisi (middle right) finished third. Prema Racing won the inaugural constructors' championship.

The 2023 F1 Academy season was a motor racing championship and the inaugural season of the F1 Academy, an all-female Formula 4-level racing series founded and organized under the management of Formula Motorsport Limited. The season commenced on 29 April at the Red Bull Ring and concluded on 22 October, supporting the United States Grand Prix at Circuit of the Americas.

Marta García won the drivers' championship with two races to spare, as her team Prema Racing won the teams' championship.

== Entries ==
The following teams and drivers were under contract to compete in the 2023 championship. As the championship was a spec series, all teams competed with an identical Tatuus F4-T421 chassis and tyre compounds developed by Pirelli. Each car was powered by a 165-horsepower turbocharged 4-cylinder engine developed by Autotecnica.

Teams	No.	Driver	Rounds	Ref.
(Spain) Campos Racing (Spain) Mercantile Campos Racing (Note: Campos Racing was re-branded as Mercantile Campos Racing ahead of round 4 for sponsorship reasons.)	1	(Spain) Nerea Martí	All	
(Spain) Campos Racing (Spain) Mercantile Campos Racing	2	(France) Lola Lovinfosse	All	
(Spain) Campos Racing (Spain) Mercantile Campos Racing	3	(Uruguay) Maite Cáceres	All	
(Netherlands) MP Motorsport	4	(United Arab Emirates) Hamda Al Qubaisi	All	
(Netherlands) MP Motorsport	5	(Netherlands) Emely de Heus	All	
(Netherlands) MP Motorsport	6	(United Arab Emirates) Amna Al Qubaisi	All	
(France) ART Grand Prix	7	(Switzerland) Léna Bühler	All	
(France) ART Grand Prix	8	(Germany) Carrie Schreiner	All	
(France) ART Grand Prix	9	(United Kingdom) Chloe Grant	All	
(United Kingdom) Rodin Carlin	10	(United Kingdom) Abbi Pulling	All	
(United Kingdom) Rodin Carlin	11	(United Kingdom) Jessica Edgar	All	
(United Kingdom) Rodin Carlin	12	(Canada) Megan Gilkes	All	
(Italy) Prema Racing	14	(United Kingdom) Chloe Chong	All	
(Italy) Prema Racing	15	(Spain) Marta García	All	
(Italy) Prema Racing	16	(Philippines) Bianca Bustamante	All	

== Calendar ==
The calendar for the 2023 season was announced in February 2023.

Round	Circuit	Race 1 & 2	Race 3
1	(Austria) Red Bull Ring, Spielberg	29 April	
2	(Spain) Circuit Ricardo Tormo, Cheste	6 May	7 May
3	(Spain) Circuit de Barcelona-Catalunya, Barcelona	20 May	21 May
4	(Netherlands) Circuit Zandvoort, Zandvoort	24 June (Note: Race 2 was moved to the regular hosting date for Race 3.)	25 June
5	(Italy) Autodromo Nazionale di Monza, Monza	8 July	9 July
6	(France) Circuit Paul Ricard, Le Castellet	30 July	
7	(United States) Circuit of the Americas, Austin	21 October	22 October

== Race results and standings ==
Round		Circuit	Date	Pole position	Fastest lap	Winning driver	Winning team	Supporting
1	R1	(Austria) Red Bull Ring	29 April	(Spain) Marta García	(Spain) Marta García	(Spain) Marta García	(Italy) Prema Racing	P9 Challenge
1	R2	(Austria) Red Bull Ring	29 April		(United Arab Emirates) Amna Al Qubaisi	(United Arab Emirates) Amna Al Qubaisi	(Netherlands) MP Motorsport	P9 Challenge
1	R3	(Austria) Red Bull Ring	29 April	(Spain) Marta García	(United Kingdom) Abbi Pulling	(Spain) Marta García	(Italy) Prema Racing	P9 Challenge
2	R1	(Spain) Circuit Ricardo Tormo	6 May	(Spain) Nerea Martí	(United Arab Emirates) Hamda Al Qubaisi	(United Arab Emirates) Hamda Al Qubaisi	(Netherlands) MP Motorsport	NASCAR Whelen Euro Series
2	R2	(Spain) Circuit Ricardo Tormo	6 May		(United Arab Emirates) Hamda Al Qubaisi	(Philippines) Bianca Bustamante	(Italy) Prema Racing	NASCAR Whelen Euro Series
2	R3	(Spain) Circuit Ricardo Tormo	7 May	(Spain) Marta García	(Spain) Marta García	(Spain) Marta García	(Italy) Prema Racing	NASCAR Whelen Euro Series
3	R1	(Spain) Circuit de Barcelona-Catalunya	20 May	(Netherlands) Emely de Heus	(Switzerland) Léna Bühler (Note: Léna Bühler set the fastest lap but did not finish in the top 10, so was ineligible to score the point for fastest lap. Hamda Al Qubaisi set the second fastest lap but also failed to finish in the top 10. Emely de Heus scored the point for setting the fastest lap of those finishing in the top 10.)	(Netherlands) Emely de Heus	(Netherlands) MP Motorsport	Formula Regional European Championship
3	R2	(Spain) Circuit de Barcelona-Catalunya	20 May		(United Arab Emirates) Amna Al Qubaisi	(United Arab Emirates) Amna Al Qubaisi	(Netherlands) MP Motorsport	Formula Regional European Championship
3	R3	(Spain) Circuit de Barcelona-Catalunya	21 May	(Switzerland) Léna Bühler	(United Arab Emirates) Hamda Al Qubaisi	(Switzerland) Léna Bühler	(France) ART Grand Prix	Formula Regional European Championship
4	R1	(Netherlands) Circuit Zandvoort	24 June	(United Arab Emirates) Hamda Al Qubaisi	(United Arab Emirates) Hamda Al Qubaisi	(United Arab Emirates) Hamda Al Qubaisi	(Netherlands) MP Motorsport	Deutsche Tourenwagen Masters
4	R2	(Netherlands) Circuit Zandvoort	25 June		(United Kingdom) Abbi Pulling	(Germany) Carrie Schreiner	(France) ART Grand Prix	Deutsche Tourenwagen Masters
4	R3	(Netherlands) Circuit Zandvoort	25 June	(United Arab Emirates) Hamda Al Qubaisi	(United Arab Emirates) Hamda Al Qubaisi	(United Arab Emirates) Hamda Al Qubaisi	(Netherlands) MP Motorsport	Deutsche Tourenwagen Masters
5	R1	(Italy) Autodromo Nazionale di Monza	8 July	(Spain) Marta García	(United Kingdom) Chloe Chong (Note: Chloe Chong set the fastest lap but did not finish in the top 10, so was ineligible to score the point for fastest lap. Hamda Al Qubaisi scored the point for setting the fastest lap of those finishing in the top 10.)	(Spain) Marta García	(Italy) Prema Racing	FIA World Endurance Championship
5	R2	(Italy) Autodromo Nazionale di Monza	8 July		(United Kingdom) Abbi Pulling	(Switzerland) Léna Bühler	(France) ART Grand Prix	FIA World Endurance Championship
5	R3	(Italy) Autodromo Nazionale di Monza	9 July	(United Kingdom) Abbi Pulling	(Spain) Marta García	(Philippines) Bianca Bustamante	(Italy) Prema Racing	FIA World Endurance Championship
6	R1	(France) Circuit Paul Ricard	30 July	(United Kingdom) Abbi Pulling	(Spain) Nerea Martí	(Spain) Nerea Martí	(Spain) Mercantile Campos Racing	Stand-alone event
6	R2	(France) Circuit Paul Ricard	30 July		(Spain) Marta García	(Spain) Marta García	(Italy) Prema Racing	Stand-alone event
6	R3	(France) Circuit Paul Ricard	30 July	(Switzerland) Léna Bühler	(Spain) Marta García	(Spain) Marta García	(Italy) Prema Racing	Stand-alone event
7	R1	(United States) Circuit of the Americas	21 October	(Spain) Marta García	(Spain) Marta García	(Spain) Marta García	(Italy) Prema Racing	Formula One World Championship
7	R2	(United States) Circuit of the Americas	21 October		(United Kingdom) Abbi Pulling	(United Arab Emirates) Hamda Al Qubaisi	(Netherlands) MP Motorsport	Formula One World Championship
7	R3	(United States) Circuit of the Americas	22 October	(United Kingdom) Jessica Edgar	(United Kingdom) Jessica Edgar	(United Kingdom) Jessica Edgar	(United Kingdom) Rodin Carlin	Formula One World Championship

=== Championship standings ===
==== Scoring system ====
Points are awarded to the top ten classified finishers in Races 1 and 3, and to the top eight classified finishers in the reverse-grid Race 2. All three races were run to a set lap count, with time-certain limits of 30 minutes for Races 1 and 3, and 20 minutes for Race 2. The pole-sitter in each Race 1 and 3 also receives two points respectively, and one point is given to the driver who sets the fastest lap of the race provided that the driver finishes inside the top ten. No point is awarded if the fastest lap time is achieved by a driver outside the top ten. No extra points are awarded to the pole-sitter in Race 2. This means there is a possible maximum of 67 points available per race meeting.

Races	Position, points per race											
Races	**1st**	**2nd**	**3rd**	**4th**	**5th**	**6th**	**7th**	**8th**	**9th**	**10th**	**Pole**	**FL**
Races 1 and 3	25	18	15	12	10	8	6	4	2	1	2	1
Race 2	10	8	6	5	4	3	2	1				1

=== Drivers' championship ===
Pos	Driver	RBR (Austria)			CRT (Spain)			CAT (Spain)			ZAN (Netherlands)			MNZ (Italy)			LEC (France)			COA (United States)			Pts
Pos	Driver	R1	R2	R3	R1	R2	R3	R1	R2	R3	R1	R2	R3	R1 (Note: 75% of the points were awarded in race 1 at Monza as more than 50% but less than 75% of the scheduled distance was completed.)	R2	R3	R1	R2	R3	R1	R2	R3	Pts
1	(Spain) Marta García	**1**	7	**1**	6	5	**1**	3	2	3	Ret	2	4	**1**	6	5	6	1	1	**1**	Ret	3	278
2	(Switzerland) Léna Bühler	Ret	2	6	3	2	4	Ret	4	**1**	2	3	3	2	1	10	4	2	**2**	3	2	4	222
3	(United Arab Emirates) Hamda Al Qubaisi	7	5	2	1	3	5	Ret	5	2	**1**	9	**1**	8	10	Ret	5	4	5	6	1	5	207
4	(Spain) Nerea Martí	DSQ	4	5	**2**	NC	2	6	6	7	3	6	6	7	11	3	1	5	4	9	5	2	181
5	(United Kingdom) Abbi Pulling	4	8	4	11	12	3	2	3	4	7	10	Ret	4	3	**2**	**2**	7	DSQ	2	4	6	175
6	(United Arab Emirates) Amna Al Qubaisi	8	1	3	7	4	6	5	1	9	8	Ret	9	9	7	4	7	3	7	8	14	10	117
7	(Philippines) Bianca Bustamante	2	9	NC	5	1	7	4	14†	10	10	8	5	Ret	2	1	13	10	14	4	7	13	116
8	(United Kingdom) Jessica Edgar	3	11	8	9	9	9	10	12	14	4	4	12	3	5	8	15	8	6	5	3	**1**	114
9	(Netherlands) Emely de Heus	Ret	6	12	14	Ret	10	**1**	8	6	5	5	2	6	12†	9	14	9	12	Ret	10	7	87
10	(France) Lola Lovinfosse	9	3	13	10	8	Ret	8	9	5	9	11	Ret	10	13†	7	3	Ret	3	10	8	15	65
11	(Germany) Carrie Schreiner	Ret	10	7	12	11	8	9	10	13	6	1	8	Ret	4	6	9	6	8	11	11	14	56
12	(United Kingdom) Chloe Grant	10	Ret	9	4	7	11	7	7	11	12	12	7	Ret	WD	WD	10	11	13	Ret	9	9	34
13	(Canada) Megan Gilkes	5	12	10	8	13	13†	11	11	8	11	7	Ret	5	Ret	Ret	11	13	9	12	13	11	31
14	(United Kingdom) Chloe Chong	6	14	11	Ret	6	14†	12	15†	15	13	14	11	11	9	12†	12	14	10	7	6	8	25
15	(Uruguay) Maite Cáceres	11	13	14	13	10	12	13	13	12	14	13	10	12	8	11†	8	12	11	Ret	12	12	6
Pos	Driver	R1	R2	R3	R1	R2	R3	R1	R2	R3	R1	R2	R3	R1	R2	R3	R1	R2	R3	R1	R2	R3	Pts
Pos	Driver	RBR (Austria)			CRT (Spain)			CAT (Spain)			ZAN (Netherlands)			MNZ (Italy)			LEC (France)			COA (United States)			Pts

Colour	Result
Gold	Winner
Silver	Second place
Bronze	Third place
Green	Points classification
Blue	Non-points classification
Blue	Non-classified finish (NC)
Purple	Retired, not classified (Ret)
Red	Did not qualify (DNQ)
Red	Did not pre-qualify (DNPQ)
Black	Disqualified (DSQ)
White	Did not start (DNS)
White	Withdrew (WD)
White	Race cancelled (C)
Blank	Did not practice (DNP)
Blank	Did not arrive (DNA)
Blank	Excluded (EX)

**Bold** – Pole
Italics – Fastest Lap
† — Did not finish, but classified

=== Teams' championship ===
Pos	Team	RBR (Austria)			VAL (Spain)			CAT (Spain)			ZAN (Netherlands)			MNZ (Italy)			LEC (France)			COA (United States)			Pts
Pos	Team	R1	R2	R3	R1	R2	R3	R1	R2	R3	R1	R2	R3	R1	R2	R3	R1	R2	R3	R1	R2	R3	Pts
1	(Italy) Prema Racing	**1**	7	**1**	5	1	**1**	3	2	3	10	2	4	**1**	2	1	6	1	1	**1**	6	3	419
1	(Italy) Prema Racing	2	9	11	6	5	7	4	14†	10	13	8	6	11	6	5	12	10	10	4	7	8	419
1	(Italy) Prema Racing	6	14	NC	Ret	6	14†	12	15†	15	Ret	14	11	Ret	9	12†	13	14	14	7	Ret	13	419
2	(Netherlands) MP Motorsport	7	1	2	1	3	5	**1**	1	2	**1**	5	**1**	6	7	4	5	3	5	6	1	5	411
2	(Netherlands) MP Motorsport	8	5	3	7	4	6	5	5	6	5	9	2	8	10	9	7	4	7	8	10	7	411
2	(Netherlands) MP Motorsport	Ret	6	12	14	Ret	10	Ret	8	9	8	Ret	9	9	12†	Ret	14	9	12	Ret	14	10	411
3	(United Kingdom) Rodin Carlin	3	8	4	8	9	3	2	3	4	4	4	12	3	3	**2**	**2**	7	6	2	3	**1**	320
3	(United Kingdom) Rodin Carlin	4	11	8	9	12	9	10	11	8	7	7	Ret	4	5	8	11	8	9	5	4	6	320
3	(United Kingdom) Rodin Carlin	5	12	10	11	13	13†	11	12	14	11	10	Ret	5	Ret	Ret	15	13	DSQ	12	13	11	320
4	(France) ART Grand Prix	10	2	6	3	2	4	7	4	**1**	2	1	3	2	1	6	4	2	**2**	3	2	4	312
4	(France) ART Grand Prix	Ret	10	7	4	7	8	9	7	11	6	3	7	Ret	4	10	9	6	8	11	9	9	312
4	(France) ART Grand Prix	Ret	Ret	9	12	11	11	Ret	10	13	12	12	8	Ret	WD	WD	10	11	13	Ret	11	14	312
5	(Spain) Campos Racing (Spain) Mercantile Campos Racing	9	3	5	**2**	8	2	6	6	5	3	6	5	7	8	3	1	5	3	9	5	2	252
5	(Spain) Campos Racing (Spain) Mercantile Campos Racing	11	4	13	10	10	12	8	9	7	9	11	10	10	11	7	3	12	4	10	8	12	252
5	(Spain) Campos Racing (Spain) Mercantile Campos Racing	DSQ	13	14	13	NC	Ret	13	13	12	14	13	Ret	12	13†	11†	8	Ret	11	Ret	12	15	252
Pos	Team	R1	R2	R3	R1	R2	R3	R1	R2	R3	R1	R2	R3	R1	R2	R3	R1	R2	R3	R1	R2	R3	Pts
Pos	Team	RBR (Austria)			VAL (Spain)			CAT (Spain)			ZAN (Netherlands)			MNZ (Italy)			LEC (France)			COA (United States)			Pts

Colour	Result
Gold	Winner
Silver	Second place
Bronze	Third place
Green	Points classification
Blue	Non-points classification
Blue	Non-classified finish (NC)
Purple	Retired, not classified (Ret)
Red	Did not qualify (DNQ)
Red	Did not pre-qualify (DNPQ)
Black	Disqualified (DSQ)
White	Did not start (DNS)
White	Withdrew (WD)
White	Race cancelled (C)
Blank	Did not practice (DNP)
Blank	Did not arrive (DNA)
Blank	Excluded (EX)

**Bold** – Pole
Italics – Fastest Lap
† — Did not finish, but classified
