= F1 Academy =

Female-only single-seater racing championship

- Category: Single-seater
- Country: International
- Inaugural season: 2023
- Drivers: List
- Chassis suppliers: Tatuus
- Engine suppliers: (Italy) Autotecnica Motori
- Tyre suppliers: (Italy) Pirelli
- Drivers' champion: (United Kingdom) Alisha Palmowski
- Teams' champion: (Spain) Campos Racing
- Official website: f1academy.com

F1 Academy is a female-only, Formula 4–level single-seater racing championship founded by the Formula One Group. The championship is a spec series, meaning that all teams compete with an identical Tatuus F4-T421 chassis and tyre compounds developed by Pirelli. Each car is powered by a 174-horsepower turbocharged 4-cylinder engine developed by Autotecnica Motori. F1 Academy held its inaugural season in 2023.

== History ==
The championship traces its roots back to 2004, when Formula Woman was established due to the lack of female drivers in other series. In 2019, the W Series was created for the same reason and was held for over three seasons, and the planned 2020 season was cancelled due to the COVID-19 pandemic. However, after the 2022 season, the series was battling financial issues and was put into administration and liquidated. On 18 November 2022, Formula One announced the creation of F1 Academy, a racing series for women aiming to focus on developing and preparing young drivers to progress to higher levels of competition. It was created to help smooth the transition from karting to the single-seater ladder. On 1 March 2023, Susie Wolff was appointed the managing director for the series.

The five teams that participated in the series in the first two seasons are ART Grand Prix, Campos Racing, Rodin Motorsport, MP Motorsport and Prema Racing. Hitech Grand Prix joined the series in 2025 as the sixth team with two full-time drivers. Hitech TGR took over Prema's 2024 role of running wild card entries as the team's third driver entry and continued that role through the 2026 season.

The wild card program was introduced in the 2024 season. It involved prioritising young drivers from the region of the race location. At races where wild card drivers participated the PREMA team took on the role of offering support and training to the drivers. In 2025 the wild card initiative changed and became a permanent part of each race with Hitech taking on the role of the wild card driver, allowing them to score in the standings.

The inaugural season in 2023 was controversially not broadcast with the exception of the season finale, which supported the United States Grand Prix at the Circuit of the Americas. Every race of the second season was then broadcast with live viewing available from a total of 23 broadcasters in more than 160 international territories. Formula E presenter Nicki Shields became the lead commentator for the season with Alex Brundle and Jordan King joining her as co-commentators. This continued into the third season.

On 3 May 2023, it was announced that Reese Witherspoon's production company, Hello Sunshine, would be creating a docuseries about F1 Academy. On 3 May 2024, exactly one year later, it was announced that the show would be available to stream on Netflix in 2025. F1: The Academy was released to Netflix on 28 May 2025 which followed the events of the 2024 season. Netflix dropped the series in 2026. On 22 October 2026, F1 Academy announced a documentary on the 2025 season titled The Pursuit: F1 Academy, which will be released in November on Disney+.

== Championship format ==
The 2023 season consisted of seven event weekends with three races each, for a total of 21 races, plus fifteen days of official testing. Each race weekend included two 30-minute races, and one 20-minute reverse-grid race, where the top eight drivers from qualifying had their starting positions reversed. The final of the seven events was a Formula One support race during the United States Grand Prix.

On 31 March 2023, Formula One CEO Stefano Domenicali announced that the 2024 season would take place exclusively on select Formula One weekends, joining Formula 2, Formula 3 and the Porsche Supercup as part of the support bill. This required a change to the race weekend format, reducing the number of races to two by removing the 20-minute reverse-grid race. The 2024 season also saw the addition of FIA Super Licence points and wild card entries. The top five drivers in the championship earn points towards an FIA Super Licence, with 10 for the champion, 7 for the runner-up, 5 for third-place, 3 for fourth, and 1 for fifth. Wild card entries will be introduced at specific rounds in order to promote and strengthen the talent pool in the areas where the series races. The wild card drivers are eligible to score points in the drivers' standings.

For the 2025 season, the weekend format changed with the first race becoming a reverse-grid race. This change put the series' format more in line with Formula 2 and Formula 3.

In the 2026 season, after the cancellation of the Jeddah round due the 2026 Iran war, F1 Academy announced that select rounds will feature a third race to restore any cancelled rounds in the future. The additional race is called the opening race and will use the drivers' second fastest qualifying lap time to determine the grid.

== Progression ==
F1 Academy drivers must be between the ages of 16 and 25, and cannot race for more than two seasons in the series. From the 2027 season onwards, drivers who had participated in two seasons may be granted an exemption to enter for a third season if it is thought to be beneficial for their development. The driver has to enter the 2026 season as their second season to qualify for the exemption.

Formula Regional European Championship (FREC) has guaranteed a fourth entry to any team that signs a driver who finished in the top three in the F1 Academy standings. 2023 drivers' champion Marta García received a fully funded seat in the 2024 championship courtesy of F1 Academy, Prema Racing, Tatuus and Pirelli. FREC is not the only option for progression as the series announced that "each season F1 Academy will work in close collaboration with the F1 Academy teams to support its winner in progressing up the motorsport ladder." 2024 drivers' champion Abbi Pulling received a fully funded seat with Rodin Motorsport for the 2025 season of GB3 Championship. For 2025, drivers' champion runner-up Maya Weug received a fully funded opportunity by F1 Academy to test a Ferrari 296 GT3 with AF Corse whereas drivers' champion Doriane Pin joined Duqueine Team to compete in the 2026 European Le Mans Series in the LMP2 Pro-Am class and became the first F1 Academy driver to receive a F1 test, where she tested the Mercedes W12. 2026 drivers' champion Alisha Palmowski was promoted to the Red Bull Junior Team and received a fully-funded seat for the 2027 season of FREC with Rodin Motorsport through the Red Bull Junior Programme and F1 Academy.

F1 Academy has been credited with increasing female participation in kart racing, where it supported nine drivers in the Champions of the Future Academy Program (COTFA) until 2025, later increasing to 27 across national and international competition for 2026. In 2024, with her victory in the OK-N class of COTFA, Luna Fluxá became the fifth woman in history to win a major senior international karting title, (Note: Luna Fluxá became the fifth woman in history to win a major senior international karting title, after: Susanna Raganelli, World Championship, 1966; Cathy Muller, European Championship, 100 cc, 1979; Sophie Kumpen, Andrea Margutti Trophy, FA, 1995; Beitske Visser, WSK Master Series, KZ2, 2010; Cyndie Allemann also won the CIK-FIA Green Helmet Trophy in 1999, with Marta García winning the Academy Trophy and Trofeo delle Industrie in 2015, all in junior classes.) and the first in a global championship since Susanna Raganelli in 1966.

== Finances ==
For the 2023 season, Formula One subsidised the cost of each car with drivers having to contribute €150,000 each. This was reduced to €100,000 for the 2024 season. Also from 2024 onwards, all the Formula One teams will support one driver each who carries the team's livery on their car. The remaining drivers, including wild card entries that was introduced in the same year, are supported by F1 Academy's partners that aim to promote women in motorsport.

== Cars ==
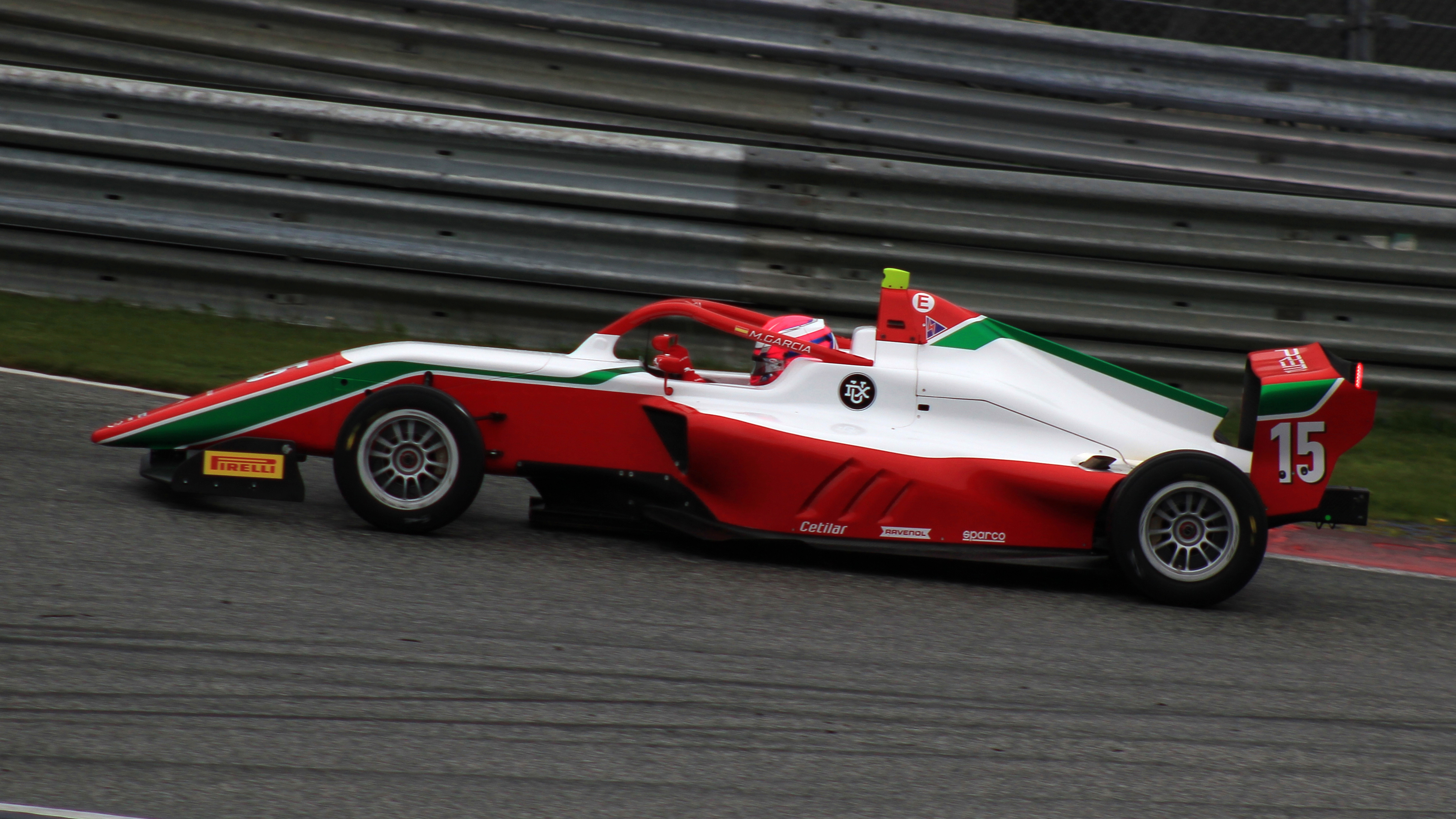
Prema Racing's car being driven by inaugural champion Marta García in 2023.

F1 Academy cars are built on the Tatuus F4-T421 chassis used in Formula 4 championships globally since 2022 with modified front and rear wings to make the aero package unique. The tyres are provided by Formula One partner Pirelli. The engine is supplied by Autotecnica Motori, a Tatuus subsidiary, and consists of a 1.4-litre turbocharged 4 cylinder, capable of delivering 130 kW (174 hp) at 5,500 rpm.

== Champions ==
=== Drivers ===
Season	Driver	Team	Poles	Wins	Podiums	Fastest laps	Points	Clinched	Margin	Ref(s)
2023	(Spain) Marta García	(Italy) Prema Racing	5	7	12	6	278	Race 19 of 21	56	
2024	(United Kingdom) Abbi Pulling	(New Zealand) Rodin Motorsport	10	9	14	6	338	Race 12 of 14	123	
2025	(France) Doriane Pin	(Italy) Prema Racing	0	4	8	7	172	Race 14 of 14	15	
2026	(United Kingdom) Alisha Palmowski	(Spain) Campos Racing	6	5	7	4	170	Race 11 of 14	67	

=== Teams ===
Season	Team	Poles	Wins	Podiums	Fastest laps	Points	Margin	Ref(s)
2023	(Italy) Prema Racing	5	9	16	7	419	8	
2024	(Italy) Prema Racing (2)	5	4	16	5	423	30	
2025	(Italy) Prema Racing (3)	0	5	12	8	296	60	
2026	(Spain) Campos Racing	5	6	12	7			

== Circuits ==
- **Bold** denotes a circuit is used in the 2026 season.
- **Italic** denotes a future circuit will be used in the 2027 season.

Number	Circuits	Rounds	Years
1	(Netherlands) **Circuit Zandvoort**	4	2023–2026
2	(Spain) Circuit de Barcelona-Catalunya	2	2023–2024
2	(United States) **Circuit of the Americas**	2	2023, 2026
2	(Saudi Arabia) **Jeddah Corniche Circuit**	2	2024–2025, 2027 (Note: The 2026 round was cancelled due to the outbreak of the Iran war.)
2	(United States) Miami International Autodrome	2	2024–2025
2	(Singapore) Marina Bay Street Circuit	2	2024–2025
2	(China) **Shanghai International Circuit**	2	2025–present
2	(Canada) **Circuit Gilles Villeneuve**	2	2025–present
2	(United States) **Las Vegas Strip Circuit**	2	2025–present
10	(Austria) Red Bull Ring	1	2023
10	(Spain) Circuito Ricardo Tormo	1	2023
10	(Italy) Monza Circuit	1	2023
10	(France) Circuit Paul Ricard	1	2023
10	(Qatar) Lusail International Circuit	1	2024
10	(United Arab Emirates) Yas Marina Circuit	1	2024
10	(United Kingdom) **Silverstone Circuit**	1	2026
17	(Hungary) **Hungaroring**	0	2027
