= Rocket (nickname) =

Rocket or The Rocket is the nickname of:

- Rocket Watts (born 2000), American basketball player
- Ronnie Baxter (born 1961), English darts player
- Roger Clemens (born 1962), American baseball pitcher
- Evan Dollard, American fitness sports competitor
- Raghib Ismail (born 1969), former professional American football and Canadian football player
- Rod Jensen (born 1979), Australian rugby league footballer
- Rod Laver (born 1938), Australian tennis player
- Rodney Morris (born 1970), pool player
- Ricky Nattiel (born 1966), American National Football League player
- Ronnie O'Sullivan (born 1975), English snooker player
- Maurice Richard (1921–2000), Canadian ice hockey player
- Hashim Ridha (born 1979), Iraqi former footballer
- Ronny Rosenthal (born 1963), Israeli soccer player, a.k.a. "Rocket Ronny"
- Robert Sovík (born 1991), Czech ice hockey player

== See also ==
- Pocket Rocket (disambiguation)
- Rocco Baldelli (born 1981), American retired Major League Baseball player nicknamed "The Woonsocket Rocket"
- Matt Bonner (born 1980), basketball player, the "Red Rocket"
- Pavel Bure (born 1971), former ice hockey player, the "Russian Rocket"
- Valeri Bure (born 1974), former ice hockey player (brother of Pavel), the "Russian Pocket Rocket"
- Brian Gionta (born 1979), American National Hockey League player, "The Rochester Rocket"
- Terry McDermott (speed skater) (born 1940), American retired speed skater and 1964 Olympic champion, the "Essexville Rocket"
- Ryan Newman (born 1977), NASCAR driver who is referred to as "The Rocket Man"
- Aleksandr Panov (footballer) (born 1975), Russian footballer nicknamed the "Kolpino rocket"
- Henri Richard (born 1936), former ice hockey player (brother of Maurice), the "Pocket Rocket"
- Song Dong-hwan (born 1980), South Korean ice hockey player, the "Korean Rocket"
