= Pocket Rocket =

Pocket Rocket may refer to:

== People with the nickname ==
- Grant Batty, former New Zealand rugby player
- Vivian Cheruiyot, Kenyan long-distance runner
- Caleb Ewan, Australian road and track bicycle racer
- Shelly-Ann Fraser-Pryce, Jamaican track and field sprinter
- Tonny de Jong, former Dutch speed skater
- Steve Joughin, Manx cyclist
- Wayne McCullough, former professional boxer from Northern Ireland
- Calvin Murphy, American former professional basketball player
- Doriane Pin, French racing driver
- Henri Richard, Canadian professional ice hockey player
- Brent Russell, South African professional rugby union player
- Darren Sadler, British former strongman competitor
- Short Sleeve Sampson, American Midget professional wrestler

== Other uses ==
- Laminex Pocket Rocket, an American sailboat
- Minibike, a miniature motorcycle
- Pocket rockets, a nickname for a pair of aces in some varieties of poker

== See also ==
- Pocket (disambiguation)
- Rocket (disambiguation)
