= Lake Marvin =

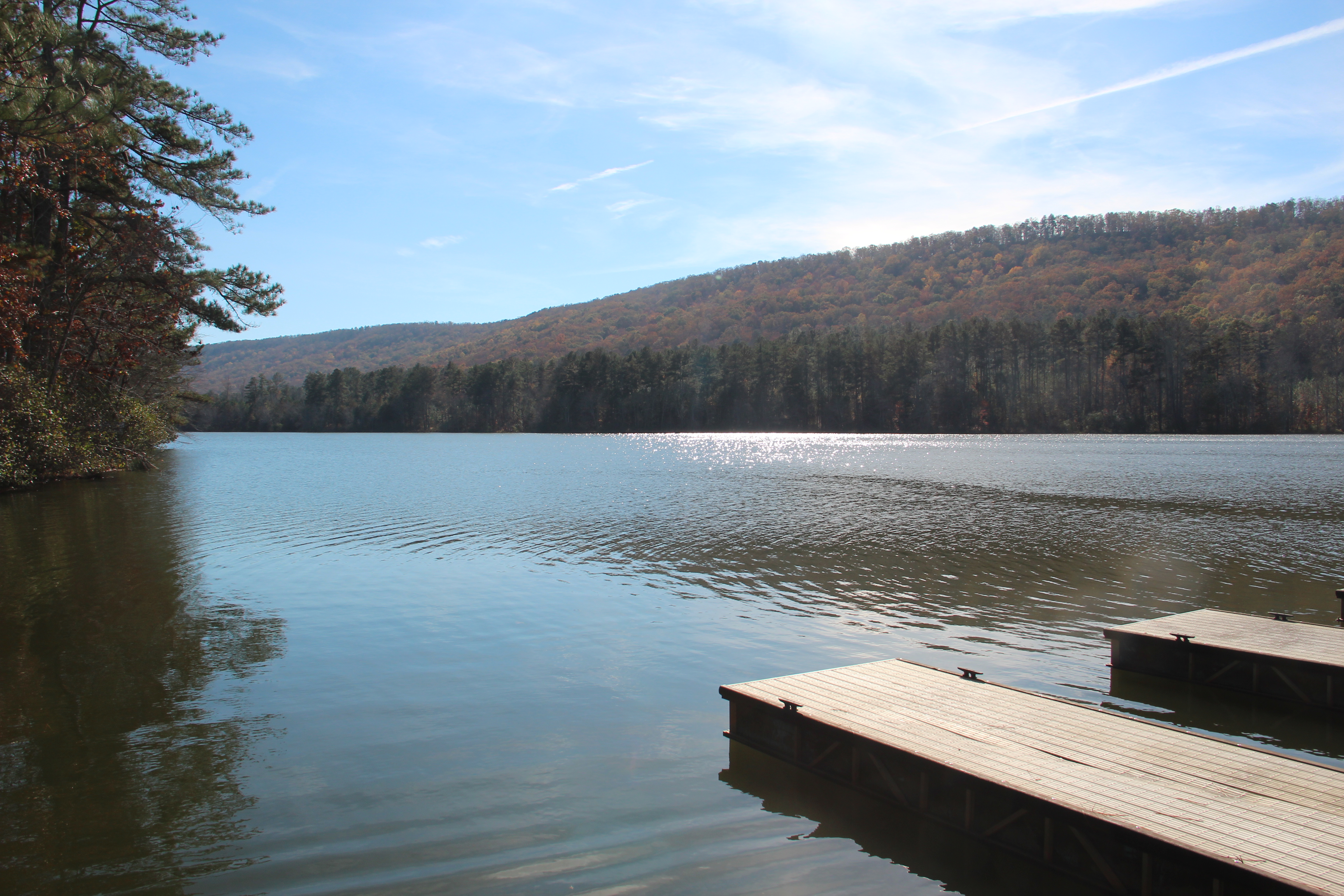

- Location within Georgia Location within the United States
- Location: Georgia
- Coordinates: 34°34′04″N 85°05′08″W
- Type: reservoir
- Primary inflows: Pocket Creek
- Primary outflows: Pocket Creek
- Basin countries: United States
- Surface area: 90 acres (0.36 km^{2})
- Surface elevation: 902 feet (275 m)

Lake Marvin is a reservoir in Floyd County, in the U.S. state of Georgia. The lake was named for Marvin Muze, the original landowner.

== Description ==
Lake Marvin is located in northern Floyd County in a basin known as The Pocket. The lake is situated between Horn Mountain and Mill Mountain, two ridges in the Ridge-and-Valley Appalachians. Calhoun is located about 8 miles (13 km) to the southeast, while Rome is located 20 miles to the south-southwest. The lake is surrounded by the Johns Mountain Wildlife Management Area and the Chattahoochee-Oconee National Forest.

The reservoir was created by the completion of Lake Marvin Dam on Pocket Creek. The lake has an area of 90 acres and a surface elevation of 902 feet (275 m). The Northwest Georgia Girl Scout Council owns the reservoir.

The lake is home to redear sunfish, bluegill, and largemouth bass.

Lake Marvin was not open to the public during the COVID-19 pandemic.

== See also ==
- List of lakes in Georgia (U.S. state)
- Pocket Creek
- The Pocket (Floyd County, Georgia)
