= Pocket (disambiguation) =

A pocket is a bag- or envelope-like receptacle, most commonly in clothing.

Pocket or The Pocket may also refer to:

== Other common meanings ==
- Pocket, a feature of some types of billiards table
- Passing pocket, a playing area in American and Canadian football
- Pocket (military), a term for when military units are cut off and surrounded by the enemy

== Places ==
- The Pocket, New South Wales, Australia, a village
- The Pocket, an area in the neighbourhood of Riverdale, Toronto, Canada
- Pocket, Virginia, an unincorporated community in the United States
- Pocket Creek, a stream in Georgia, United States
- The Pocket – Floyd County, Georgia, United States, a recreational area
- Pocket-Greenhaven, Sacramento, California, a neighborhood also called "The Pocket"

== Businesses ==
- Pocket Bicycles, a manufacturer of portable bicycles located in Massachusetts in the 1970s
- Pocket Books, a publisher of small paperback books, a division of Simon & Schuster
- Pocket Communications, a former regional cellular phone company in South Texas

== Music ==
- Pocket (musician) a remixer and producer
- "Pocket" (Ai Otsuka song), 2007
- "Pocket" (Sam Sparro song), 2008
- "Pocket", 2003 song by Psapp from Do Something Wrong
- Pockets, a soul group from Baltimore
- The Pockets, the original name for the band Saga
- Pockets (album) by Karate
- "In the pocket", musical slang for playing in sync with other members of an ensemble.

== Video game consoles ==
- Bemani Pocket, a series of video game consoles from Konami
- Pelican VG Pocket, an early handheld video game console
- Analogue Pocket, a handheld game console

== Other uses ==
- Pocket (service), management tool for keeping articles for reading later
- Herbert Pocket, a character in the novel Great Expectations by Charles Dickens
- Pocket Magazine, a defunct American literary magazine established in 1895
- Pocket Athletic Conference, a high school athletic conference in Indiana, United States
- Pocket pet, a small furry household pet
