= Nina Gademan =

Dutch racing driver (born 2003)

- Gademan on the podium at the 2026 Dutch Grand Prix
- Nationality: (Netherlands) Dutch
- Born: Nina Pothof; 30 August 2003 (age 23) Wijster, Drenthe, Netherlands

F1 Academy career
- Debut season: 2024
- Current team: MP Motorsport
- Car number: 3
- Former teams: Prema Racing
- Starts: 28
- Wins: 3
- Podiums: 10
- Poles: 0
- Fastest laps: 0
- Best finish: 6th in 2025

Previous series
- 2025; 2025; 2025; 2024-2025; 2022: Formula Winter Series; Formula Trophy; F4 Saudi Arabian; F4 British; Belcar Endurance
Medal record
Karting
Representing Netherlands
FIA Motorsport Games
Gold medal – first place	2019 Rome	Karting Slalom Cup
- Statistics up to date as of 13 November 2026.

Nina Gademan (born Nina Pothof; 30 August 2003) is a Dutch racing driver who competes in F1 Academy for Prema and the F4 British Championship for Hitech TGR as part of the Alpine Academy.

Gademan previously raced in the F4 British Championship with Fortec Motorsport. She won the gold medal in the 2019 FIA Motorsport Games Karting Slalom Cup and finished in sixth place in the 2025 F1 Academy Season.

== Career ==
=== Karting ===
Gademan drove her first go-kart at five years old.

In 2018, Gademan was chosen as a finalist for the 2019 FIA Girls On Track Le Mans Shootout. She was then selected as one of six drivers for the Girls on Track European Team.

Gademan competed in the Karting Slalom Cup in the 2019 FIA Motorsport Games, winning gold with her teammate Bastiaan van Loenen.

=== British F4 Championship ===
Gademan made her single-seater debut in the 2024 British F4 Championship, driving for Fortec Motorsports. She earned her only rookie podium in the fourth round, with a finish of 13th at Thruxton. Her best result of the season was an 11th place at the seventh round of the season at Knockhill. Gademan finished 18th in the championship with 28 points.

=== F1 Academy ===
==== 2024 ====
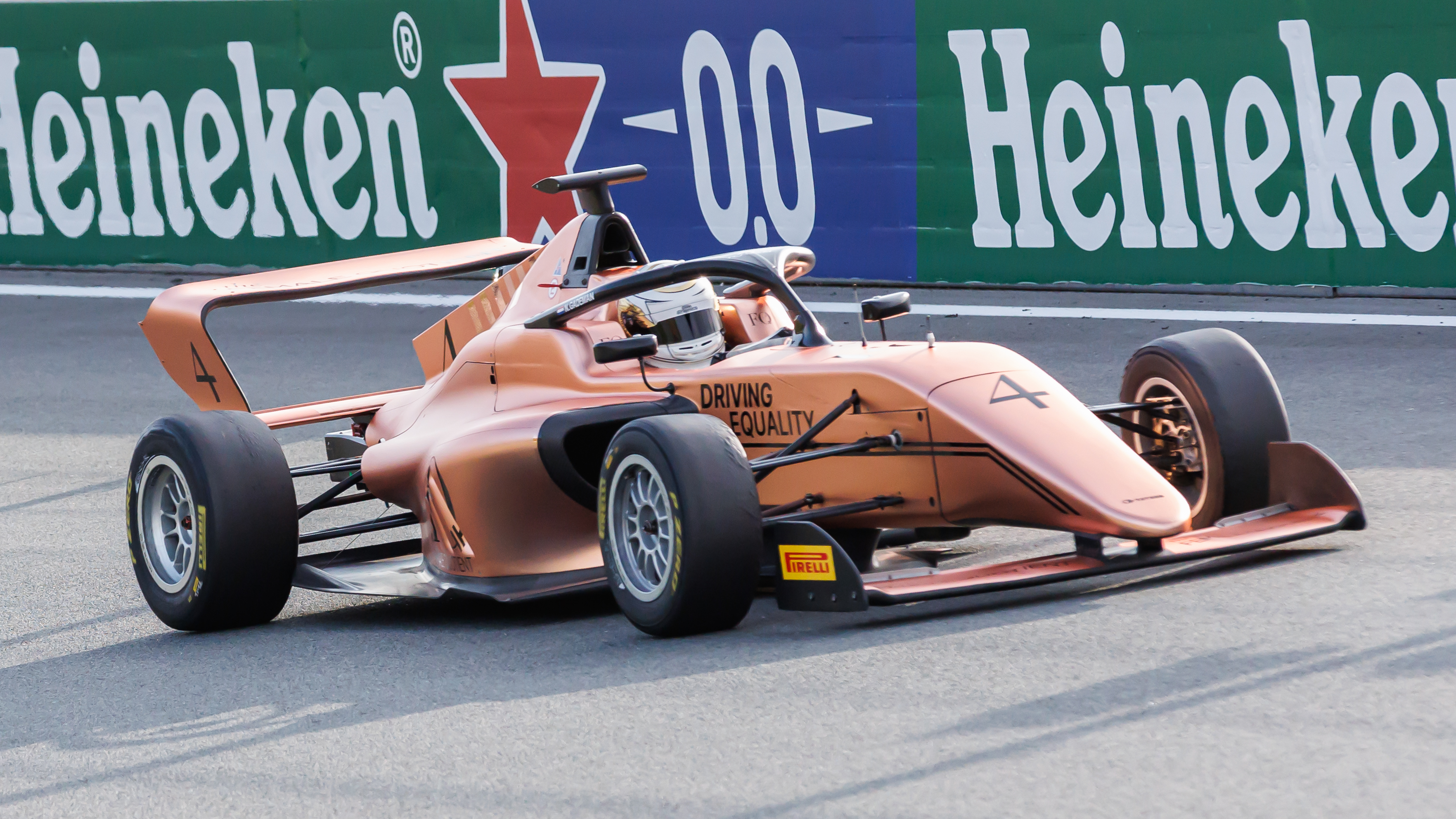
Gademan at Zandvoort in 2024.

On 21 August 2024, Gademan was chosen as the wildcard for Round 4 of the 2024 season of F1 Academy in Zandvoort. She finished in sixth place in both qualifying sessions, and scored points in both races, becoming the first wildcard driver to do so. She finished in fourth place in Races 1 and 2 but was classified in tenth place for Race 2 after receiving a penalty for contact with Aurelia Nobels.

==== 2025 ====
Gademan had a full-time seat in the 2025 F1 Academy season with Prema Racing, replacing 2024 F1 Academy champion Abbi Pulling as the Alpine supported driver. In Race 1 at Round 1 in Shanghai, Gademan qualified on reverse-grid pole and led the race until she suffered a mechanical issue on the penultimate lap and retired the car. Gademan participated in the F1 Academy in-season testing sessions in Jeddah, where she was in a high-impact accident on 5 April 2025 and was taken to the medical centre for checks. Although she was physically cleared, she was unable to participate in the final day of testing due to the damage to the car.

During Race 2 in Montreal, Gademan overtook Chloe Chong, who started on reverse-grid pole, to lead the race until she was overtaken by Emma Felbermayr and Ella Lloyd after the safety car restart in the closing laps. Gademan finished the race in third to earn her first F1 Academy podium, behind Felbermayr and Lloyd, respectively. Gademan secured her maiden F1 Academy win at her home race at Round 5 in Zandvoort, where she converted her reverse-grid pole to victory. That same weekend, she was declared unfit to drive and was not able to participate in the second free practice session. After losing out in Shanghai and Montreal, Gademan led every lap of Race 1 and stood on the top step in Zandvoort.

Gademan finished the 2025 F1 Academy Season in sixth place overall, with one win and four podiums. She secured Prema Racing's third consecutive title in the Teams' championship with teammates Doriane Pin and Tina Hausmann.

==== 2026 ====
Gademan continued to be backed by Alpine for the 2026 F1 Academy season, but switched to MP Motorsport.

=== Formula Winter Series ===
Gademan competed in 2025 Formula Winter Series with Hitech TGR, and scored regular points finishes in the two rounds she competed in and finished the championship in 15th with 13 points.

== Personal life ==
Gademan was born in Wijster, a village in the Netherlands in the province of Drenthe. Her family struggled to financially support her professional career, which led to her taking a break from racing for about one year and a half. She started creating sim racing videos on social media and raised enough funds to return to professional racing.

Alongside racing, Gademan also works as an Esports content creator with F1 Esports and Veloce Esports.

== Karting record ==
=== Karting career summary ===
Season	Series	Team	Position
2019	IAME International Final - X30 Senior		
2019	IAME Euro Series - X30 Senior	VK Racing	
2019	FIA Motorsport Games Karting Slalom Cup	Team Netherlands	1st
2024	Rotax Max Challenge Champions Winter Trophy - DD2 Master	Pothof Nina	14th

== Racing record ==
=== Racing career summary ===
Season	Series	Team	Races	Wins	Poles	F/Laps	Podiums	Points	Position
2022	Belcar Endurance Championship	Xwift Racing Events	1	0	0	0	0	N/A	16th
2024	F4 British Championship	Fortec Motorsport	26	0	0	0	0	28	18th
2024	F1 Academy	Prema Racing	2	0	0	0	0	13	16th
2025	Formula Winter Series	Hitech TGR	9	0	0	0	0	13	15th
2025	F4 British Championship	Hitech TGR	3	0	0	0	0	6	32nd
2025	Formula Trophy	Hitech TGR	2	0	0	0	0	10	14th
2025	F1 Academy	Prema Racing	14	1	0	0	4	74	6th
2025	F4 Saudi Arabian Championship	Caraagy	2	0	0	0	2	43	9th
2025	F4 Saudi Arabian Championship	Valvoline	2	0	0	0	0	43	9th
2026	F1 Academy	MP Motorsport	14	2	0	0	7	134	**2nd**

* Season still in progress.

=== Complete F4 British Championship results ===
(key) (Races in bold indicate pole position) (Races in italics indicate fastest lap)

Year	Team	1	2	3	4	5	6	7	8	9	10	11	12	13	14	15	16	17	18	19	20	21	22	23	24	25	26	27	28	29	30	31	32	DC	Points
2024	Fortec Motorsport	DPN; 1; 19	DPN; 2; 18^{3}	DPN; 3 C	BHI; 1; 16	BHI; 2; 19^{1}	BHI; 3; 13	SNE; 1; 16	SNE; 2; 12^{7}	SNE; 3; 16	THR; 1; 13	THR; 2; 14^{2}	THR; 3; 14	SILGP; 1; 15	SILGP; 2; 17^{2}	SILGP; 3; 18	ZAN; 1; 16	ZAN; 2; 12^{2}	ZAN; 3 Ret	KNO; 1; 14	KNO; 2; 11^{5}	KNO; 3; 14	DPGP; 1	DPGP; 2	DPGP; 3	DPGP; 4	SILN; 1; 16	SILN; 2 C	SILN; 3; 17	BHGP; 1; 14	BHGP; 2; 13	BHGP; 3; 12^{6}	BHGP; 3; 14	18th	28
2025	Hitech TGR	DPN; 1	DPN; 2	DPN; 3	SILGP; 1	SILGP; 2	SILGP; 3	SNE; 1	SNE; 2	SNE; 3	THR; 1	THR; 2	THR; 3	OUL; 1	OUL; 2	OUL; 3	SILGP; 1; 16	SILGP; 2; 23	ZAN; 1; 20	ZAN; 2; 14^{6}	ZAN; 3; 15	KNO; 1	KNO; 2	KNO; 3	DPGP; 1	DPGP; 2	DPGP; 3	SILN; 1	SILN; 2	SILN; 3	BHGP; 1	BHGP; 2	BHGP; 3	32nd	6

=== Complete F1 Academy results ===
(key) (Races in bold indicate pole position; races in italics indicate fastest lap)

Year	Team	1	2	3	4	5	6	7	8	9	10	11	12	13	14	15	DC	Points
2024	Prema Racing	JED; 1	JED; 2	MIA; 1	MIA; 2	CAT; 1	CAT; 2	ZAN; 1; 4	ZAN; 2; 10	SIN; 1	SIN; 2	LSL; 1	LSL; 2	YMC; 1	YMC; 2	YMC; 3	16th	13
2025	Prema Racing	SHA; 1; 15†	SHA; 2; 10	JED; 1; 8	JED; 2; 7	MIA; 1; 5	MIA; 2 C	MTL; 1; 3	MTL; 2; 3	MTL; 3; 13	ZAN; 1; 1	ZAN; 2; 6	SIN; 1; 8	SIN; 2; 6	LVG; 1; 2	LVG; 2; 7	6th	74
2026	MP Motorsport	SHA; 1; 1	SHA; 2; 4	MTL; 1; 9	MTL; 2 Ret	MTL; 3; 7	SIL; 1; 2	SIL; 2; 4	ZAN; 1; 3	ZAN; 2; 3	COA; 1; 2	COA; 2; 5	COA; 3; 1	LVG; 1	LVG; 2			

† Did not finish, but classified.

=== Complete Formula Winter Series results ===
(key) (Races in bold indicate pole position) (Races in italics indicate fastest lap)

Year	Team	1	2	3	4	5	6	7	8	9	10	11	12	DC	Points
2025	Hitech TGR	POR; 1; 6	POR; 2; 10	POR; 3; 11	CRT; 1; 11	CRT; 2; 10	CRT; 3; 14	ARA; 1; 9	ARA; 2; 10	ARA; 3; 22	CAT; 1	CAT; 2	CAT; 3	15th	13

=== Complete F4 Saudi Arabian Championship results ===
(key) (Races in bold indicate pole position) (Races in italics indicate fastest lap)

Year	Team	1	2	3	4	5	6	7	8	9	10	DC	Points
2025	Caraagy	BHR1; 1; 2	BHR1; 2; 3	BHR2; 1	BHR2; 2	JED1; 1	JED1; 2	JED2; 1	JED2; 2			9th	43
2025	Valvoline									JED3; 1; 5	JED3; 2 Ret	9th	43

=== Complete Formula Trophy results ===
(key) (Races in bold indicate pole position; races in italics indicate fastest lap)

Year	Team	1	2	3	4	5	6	7	DC	Points
2025	Hitech TGR	DUB; 1	DUB; 2	DUB; 3	YMC1; 1	YMC1; 2	YMC2; 1; 5	YMC2; 2; 11	14th	10
