= 2022 Ferrari Challenge Europe =

Motorsport event

The 2022 Ferrari Challenge Europe was the 30th season of Ferrari Challenge Europe and its predecessor Ferrari Challenge Italy. The season consists of 7 rounds, starting at the Autódromo Internacional do Algarve on 2 April 2022 and ending at the Autodromo Enzo e Dino Ferrari during the Ferrari World Finals on 30 October 2022.

== Calendar ==
The season consists of 14 races run at seven different circuits in Europe.

Rnd.	Circuit	Dates	Map
1	(Portugal) Autódromo Internacional do Algarve	2–3 April	2022 Ferrari Challenge Europe is located in Europe
2	(France) Circuit Paul Ricard	14–15 May	2022 Ferrari Challenge Europe is located in Europe
3	(Hungary) Hungaroring	18–19 June	2022 Ferrari Challenge Europe is located in Europe
4	(Germany) Hockenheimring	23–24 July	2022 Ferrari Challenge Europe is located in Europe
5	(United Kingdom) Silverstone Circuit	17–18 September	2022 Ferrari Challenge Europe is located in Europe
6	(Italy) Autodromo Internazionale del Mugello	8–9 October	2022 Ferrari Challenge Europe is located in Europe
7	(Italy) Autodromo Enzo e Dino Ferrari	28–29 October	2022 Ferrari Challenge Europe is located in Europe

== Entry list ==
=== Trofeo Pirelli ===
Team	No.	Driver	Class	Rounds
(France) SF Côte d'Azur Cannes	2	(France) Ange Barde	Pro-Am	All
(Italy) Chiuini De Poi	3	(Italy) Max Mugelli	Pro	2-4, 6-7
(Italy) Chiuini De Poi	19	(Italy) Eliseo Donno	Pro	3-4, 6-7
(Italy) Chiuini De Poi	22	(Italy) Nicola Marinangeli	Pro	6
(Italy) Chiuini De Poi	50	(Italy) David Gostner	Pro-Am	1-3, 5-7
(Denmark) Formula Racing	4	(Denmark) Christian Brunsborg	Pro-Am	1-3, 6-7
(Denmark) Formula Racing	20	(Denmark) Conrad Laursen	Pro	4
(Denmark) Formula Racing	25	(Italy) Alessandro Cozzi	Pro-Am	All
(Denmark) Formula Racing	66	(Finland) Luka Nurmi	Pro	All
(Germany) Gohm Motorsport	5	(Germany) Adrian Sutil	Pro	2, 4, 7
(Germany) Gohm Motorsport	71	(Italy) Germano Salernitano	Pro-Am	4, 6
(France) Charles Pozzi	6	(France) Thomas Neubauer	Pro	4, 6-7
(Switzerland) Kessel Racing	7	(United Arab Emirates) Omar Jackson	Pro-Am	1-2, 5
(Switzerland) Kessel Racing	8	(Switzerland) Nicolò Rosi	Pro-Am	All
(Switzerland) Kessel Racing	17	(Switzerland) Alexandre Bochez	Pro-Am	2, 6-7
(Switzerland) Kessel Racing	44	(United Kingdom) Andrew Gilbert	Pro-Am	1-5, 7
(Switzerland) Kessel Racing	55	(Switzerland) Mikael Bochez	Pro-Am	2, 6-7
(United Kingdom) Charles Hurst	9	(United Kingdom) Andrew Morrow	Pro-Am	7
(Czech Republic) Scuderia Praha	11	(Czech Republic) Josef Král	Pro	3
(Switzerland) (Italy) Scuderia Niki Hasler – Iron Lynx	13	(Germany) Arno Dahlmeyer	Pro-Am	All
(Switzerland) (Italy) Scuderia Niki Hasler – Iron Lynx	83	(France) Doriane Pin	Pro	All
(Spain) Cars Gallery Barcelona	14	(Spain) Andujar Pulido	Pro-Am	1
(United Kingdom) HR Owen	16	(Netherlands) Han Sikkens	Pro-Am	7
(United Kingdom) HR Owen	76	(Saudi Arabia) Faisal Al-Faisal	Pro-Am	7
(United Kingdom) Graypaul Nottingham	24	(United Kingdom) Lucky Khera	Pro-Am	5
(United Kingdom) Graypaul Nottingham	90	(United Kingdom) Jack Brown	Pro-Am	5
Francorchamps Motors Luxembourg	26	(Belgium) John Wartique	Pro	All
(Saudi Arabia) Al-Tayer Motors	27	(Italy) Marco Pulcini	Pro-Am	All
(Italy) Rossocorsa	33	(Italy) Emanuele-Maria Tabacchi	Pro	6
(Italy) Rossocorsa	80	(Venezuela) Angelo Fontana	Pro-Am	5
(Germany) Riller und Schnauck	85	(Germany) Hanno Laskowski	Pro-Am	1-2, 4, 6-7
(Belgium) Francorchamps Motors Antwerp	89	(Netherlands) Nigel Schoonderwoerd	Pro-Am	2, 6-7

== Championship standings ==
=== Trofeo Pirelli ===
Position	1st	2nd	3rd	4th	5th	6th	7th	8th
Points	15	13	11	8	7	4	2	1

Pos.	Driver	ALG (Portugal)		LEC (France)		BUD (Hungary)		HOC (Germany)		SIL (United Kingdom)		MUG (Italy)		IMO (Italy)		Points
Pos.	Driver	R1	R2	R1	R2	R1	R2	R1	R2	R1	R2	R1	R2	R1	R2	Points
Pro
1	(France) Doriane Pin	1	1	4	3	1	1	1	1	1	1	3	3	1	2	213
2	(Belgium) John Wartique	3	3	2	1	2	2	4	2	2	2	4	1	3	Ret	158
3	(Finland) Luka Nurmi	2	2	3	4	4	3	2	3	3	3	5	4	2	6	139
4	(Italy) Eliseo Donno					5	Ret	3	7			1	8	Ret	1	56
5	(Germany) Adrian Sutil			1	2			7	6					4	4	52
6	(Italy) Max Mugelli			5	5	6	5	6	Ret			6	5	5	7	49
7	(France) Thomas Neubauer							NC	5			2	2	Ret	3	44
8	(Czech Republic) Josef Král					3	4									19
9	(Italy) Nicola Marinangeli											7	7	6	5	16
10	(Denmark) Conrad Laursen							5	4							15
11	(Italy) Emanuele-Maria Tabacchi											8	6			6
Standings:
