= 2025 Formula Regional European Championship =

Motor racing competition

The 2025 Formula Regional European Championship by Alpine was a multi-event, Formula Regional open-wheel single seater motor racing championship held across Europe. The championship featured a mix of professional and amateur drivers, competing in Formula Regional cars that conform to the FIA Formula Regional regulations for the championship. This was the seventh season of the championship and the fifth after a merger with Formula Renault Eurocup which resulted in the change of the engine supplier to Alpine.

Prema Racing's Freddie Slater won the Drivers' Championship title at the penultimate race of the season, while Van Amersfoort Racing's Dion Gowda clinched the Rookie Championship title at the same race. R-ace GP won the Team's Championship title for the second time.

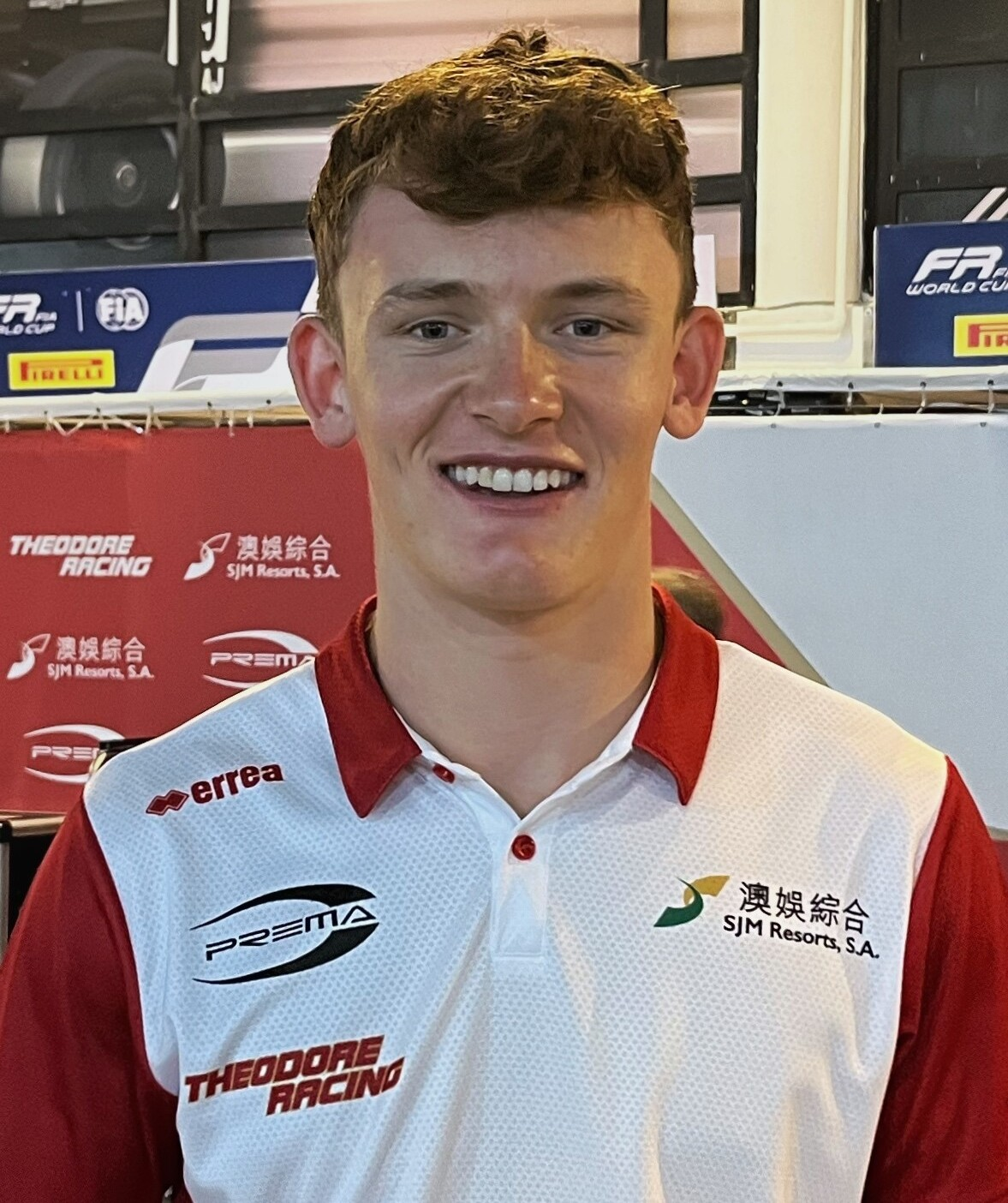
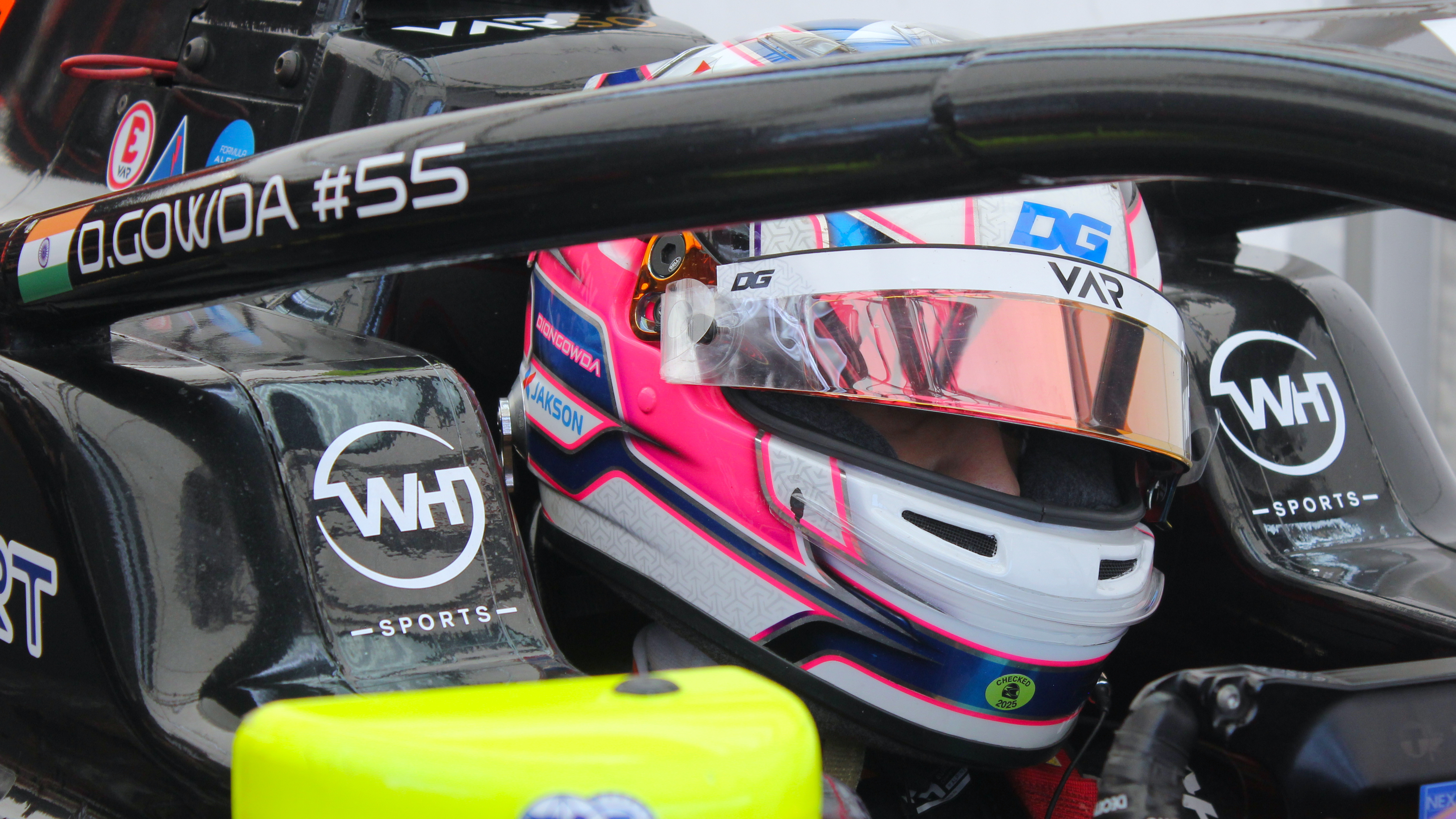
Freddie Slater (Prema Racing, top) won the Drivers' Championship. Dion Gowda (Van Amersfoort Racing, bottom) won the Rookie championship.

== Teams and drivers ==
All teams compete using identical Tatuus FR-19 cars powered by 1.8L Alpine-badged turbocharged Nissan MR18 engines on Pirelli tyres. Nine of the eleven teams that contested the 2024 season were also confirmed to be pre-selected for 2025.

Team	No.	Driver	Status	Rounds
(Switzerland) G4 Racing	2	(France) Édouard Borgna	R	All
(Switzerland) G4 Racing	3	(France) Arthur Aegerter	R	1–3, 5
(Switzerland) G4 Racing	3	(Luxembourg) Enzo Richer		4
(Switzerland) G4 Racing	3	(Kuwait) Saqer Al-Maosherji	R	7–10
(Switzerland) G4 Racing	3	(Poland) Kacper Sztuka		6
(Switzerland) G4 Racing	35	(Poland) Kacper Sztuka		1
(Switzerland) G4 Racing	35	(Spain) Edu Robinson	R	4–10
(Italy) Trident	5	(China) Ruiqi Liu		All
(Italy) Trident	7	(Thailand) Nandhavud Bhirombhakdi		All
(Italy) Trident	8	(Italy) Matteo De Palo		All
(Netherlands) Van Amersfoort Racing	6	(Japan) Hiyu Yamakoshi		All
(Netherlands) Van Amersfoort Racing	22	(Brazil) Pedro Clerot		All
(Netherlands) Van Amersfoort Racing	55	(United Kingdom) Dion Gowda (Note: Gowda is an Indian driver competing under a British licence.)	R	All
(Italy) CL Motorsport	9	(France) Macéo Capietto		2
(Italy) CL Motorsport	9	(Malta) Zachary David (Note: David is a Filipino driver competing under a Maltese licence.)		4–6
(Italy) CL Motorsport	9	(Italy) Zhenrui Chi (Note: Chi is a Chinese driver competing under an Italian licence.)	R	7, 9
(Italy) CL Motorsport	12	(Italy) Valerio Rinicella		1
(Italy) CL Motorsport	12	(Switzerland) Enea Frey	R	7, 9–10
(Italy) CL Motorsport	20	(Kyrgyzstan) Michael Belov (Note: Bedrin and Belov are Russian, but they compete under Italian and Kyrgyz licences respectively as Russian national emblems were banned by the FIA following the Russian invasion of Ukraine.)		2–10
(France) Saintéloc Racing	10	(Italy) Nikita Bedrin		All
(France) Saintéloc Racing	50	(Netherlands) Tim Gerhards	R	1–3, 5–9
(France) Saintéloc Racing	50	(Netherlands) Maya Weug		4
(France) Saintéloc Racing	50	(United States) James Egozi	G	10
(France) Saintéloc Racing	96	(Ukraine) Yaroslav Veselaho		2–10
(France) R-ace GP	11	(Japan) Jin Nakamura		All
(France) R-ace GP	23	(France) Enzo Deligny		All
(France) R-ace GP	31	(India) Akshay Bohra		All
(Italy) Prema Racing	14	(United Arab Emirates) Rashid Al Dhaheri		All
(Italy) Prema Racing	27	(United Kingdom) Freddie Slater		All
(Italy) Prema Racing	28	(France) Doriane Pin		2–5
(Italy) Prema Racing	41	(United States) Alex Powell	R G	7
(Italy) Prema Racing	45	(Australia) Jack Beeton		All
(Italy) Prema Racing	56	(China) Yuanpu Cui	R G	8–9
(United Arab Emirates) AKCEL GP	15	(United Kingdom) Aditya Kulkarni (Note: Kulkarni is an Indian driver competing under a British licence.)		1–4, 6
(United Arab Emirates) AKCEL GP	16	(Kuwait) Saqer Al-Maosherji	R	1–4, 6
(United Arab Emirates) AKCEL GP	44	(Spain) Javier Sagrera		4, 6
(France) ART Grand Prix	19	(Japan) Kanato Le		All
(France) ART Grand Prix	89	(France) Taito Kato (Note: Kato is a Japanese driver competing under a French licence.)		All
(France) ART Grand Prix	95	(France) Evan Giltaire		All
(Italy) RPM	21	(Chinese Taipei) Rui-Heng Yeh (Note: Yeh is a Taiwanese driver competing under the "Chinese Taipei" flag, which is used by the FIA to designate drivers licensed by the Chinese Taipei Automobile Federation.)		1–6
(Italy) RPM	21	(Netherlands) Reno Francot	R	7
(Italy) RPM	21	(France) Macéo Capietto		8
(Italy) RPM	21	(Poland) Kacper Sztuka		9
(Italy) RPM	21	(Latvia) Tomass Štolcermanis	R G	10
(Italy) RPM	74	(France) Enzo Peugeot		1–3
(Italy) RPM	74	(Belgium) Ean Eyckmans	R	4–7
(Italy) RPM	74	(Mexico) Santiago Ramos	G	8
(Italy) RPM	74	(United States) James Egozi	G	9
(Italy) RPM	74	(Poland) Jan Przyrowski	R G	10
(Italy) RPM	99	(Italy) Giovanni Maschio		All

Icon	Status
R	Rookie
G	Guest driver

=== Team changes ===
Iron Dames, who entered the championship in 2024 with a two-car all-female driver lineup, did not continue their entry into 2025 to focus on their endurance racing ventures.

MP Motorsport, a series mainstay ever since its inception, also left the championship. The team's entry was replaced by a new Italian-based Chinese team called CL Motorsport.

Emirati team AKCEL GP joined the championship, becoming the first Asian team to enter the series.

Despite being among the pre-selected teams for the 2025 season, KIC Motorsport discontinued their FRECA programme after having competed in the series since 2019.

=== Driver changes ===
Reigning Teams' Champions Prema Racing saw all three of their drivers graduate to FIA F3, with reigning Drivers' Champion Rafael Câmara and James Wharton joining Trident and ART Grand Prix respectively, while Ugo Ugochukwu remained with Prema. The team promoted two drivers from their own Formula 4 operation in Freddie Slater, winner of the 2024 F4 UAE and F4 Italian championships, and Rashid Al Dhaheri, who came fourth and tenth in the same two championships in 2024. Jack Beeton, who was runner-up to Slater in Italian F4 with US Racing, piloted the third car of Prema's lineup. The team also fielded a fourth car for 2024 F1 Academy runner-up Doriane Pin, who embarked on her second season in the championship after coming 27th with departing team Iron Dames in 2024. Pin contested the rounds that do not clash with her main F1 Academy program.

Zachary David and Tuukka Taponen left R-ace GP, with David joining the new CL Motorsport team and Taponen leaving the series to move up to FIA F3 with ART Grand Prix. The team signed Akshay Bohra, who won the Euro 4 Championship in 2024 with US Racing, and TGR junior driver Jin Nakamura, who made his racing debut in Europe after finishing the 2024 Super Formula Lights in fourth driving for TOM'S.

Van Amersfoort Racing saw both Brando Badoer and Ivan Domingues graduate to FIA F3, with Badoer joining Prema and Domingues remaining with the team. To fill their seats, VAR promoted Hiyu Yamakoshi from its Italian F4 outfit after he came third in 2024, and signed Dion Gowda, who finished 11th with Prema in that championship.

ART Grand Prix saw both Yaroslav Veselaho and Alessandro Giusti leave the team as Veselaho moved to Saintéloc Racing and Giusti joined MP Motorsport in FIA F3. The team signed 2024 French F4 Champion Taito Kato, who was joined by Kanato Le, who finished 18th with G4 Racing in 2024.

Saintéloc Racing had an all-new line up as Enzo Peugeot, Matteo De Palo and Théophile Naël all left the team: Peugeot and De Palo moved over to RPM and Trident respectively, while Naël graduated to FIA F3 with Van Amersfoort Racing. The team signed Yaroslav Veselaho, who finished 35th in the standings with ART Grand Prix in his rookie season in 2024, Tim Gerhards, who finished 23rd in the 2024 Spanish F4 Championship with Monlau Motorsport, and Nikita Bedrin, who embarked on his third year in the category after finishing the 2024 season in 16th driving for MP Motorsport.

RPM signed two new drivers as reigning Rookies' Champion Noah Strømsted joined Trident in FIA F3 and Edgar Pierre moved to R-ace GP in the Le Mans Cup's LMP3 class. To replace them, RPM signed Enzo Peugeot, who finished the 2024 season in 15th with Saintéloc Racing, and Rui-Heng Yeh, who stepped up to Formula Regional after taking two podiums in two years of F4 competition.

Trident also took on two new drivers as Alpine Academy driver Nicola Lacorte and Roman Bilinski both stepped up to FIA F3 with DAMS and Rodin Motorsport respectively. The team signed two drivers switching from other teams in Matteo De Palo, who finished his debut season in 2024 17th with Saintéloc Racing, and Nandhavud Bhirombhakdi, who came 24th with KIC Motorsport in 2024.

G4 Racing saw Kanato Le leave the team to join ART Grand Prix, while Romain Andriolo switched to the GT World Challenge Europe Endurance Cup with HRT Ford Performance and none of the team's three part-time competitors rejoined the series in 2025. G4 signed Édouard Borgna, who graduated from French F4 after finishing the 2024 season in 19th, as well as taking on Ultimate Cup Series Formula Cup driver Arthur Aegerter and signing Eurocup-3 driver Kacper Sztuka to compete in the opening round as well as the round at Imola.

KIC announced no drivers ahead of the 2025 season, while Nandhavud Bhirombhakdi left the team to join Trident, Alex Sawer switched to Formula 4 South East Asia with Evans GP and none of the other five drivers the team fielded in 2024 returned to the series.

New team CL Motorsport signed Zachary David, who embarked on his second season in the championship after coming 13th with R-ace GP in 2024. Valerio Rinicella, who came 20th driving for MP Motorsport, drove for the team at the opening round in place of David, as he prioritized his Super Formula Lights campaign with B-Max Racing Team.

New team AKCEL GP signed two FRECA debutants in Aditya Kulkarni, who made his category debut by coming 20th in FRMEC, also driving for AKCEL GP, and Saqer Al-Maosherji, who previously competed in the F4 Saudi Arabian Championship, coming sixth.

Departing team MP Motorsport saw Nikita Bedrin move to Saintéloc Racing, and Valerio Rinicella join its Eurocup-3 outfit, with whom he already contested the one-off non-championship round in 2024.

Departing team Iron Dames saw Doriane Pin moving to Prema Racing, while Marta García exited single-seater motorsport to join the team's outfit in the Le Mans Cup.

==== Mid-season ====
CL Motorsport expanded to a two-car lineup ahead of the round at Spa, but with Rinicella only entering the first round and David still prioritizing his Super Formula Lights campaign, the team fielded Michael Belov and Macéo Capietto. Capietto left the team after just one round, leading to CL Motorsport only fielding Belov at Circuit Zandvoort.

After only fielding two cars in the second and third round, G4 Racing announced ahead of the round at the Hungaroring that Edu Robinson, who had made his FR-level debut in Eurocup-3 in June, would join the team for the rest of the season. Aegerter meanwhile left the team and was replaced by another UCES Formula Cup driver, reigning champion Enzo Richer, for the fourth round of the year. AKCEL GP also saw a driver change as the team signed Eurocup-3 runner-up Javier Sagrera for the remainder of the campaign. Enzo Peugeot left RPM and was replaced by Formula Regional debutant Ean Eyckmans for rounds four and five. Saintéloc's Tim Gerhards was forced to sit out the round after sustaining an injury in a bicycle accident. He was replaced by Maya Weug, who returned to FRECA where she contested 22 races over two seasons.

Both Gerhards and Aegerter returned for round five at Circuit Paul Ricard, while all three AKCEL GP drivers skipped the event.

Round six saw the return of both AKCEL GP and Sztuka at G4 Racing, who this time stepped in for the once again absent Aegerter.

CL Motorsport entered three cars in round seven at Spielberg, with the entry of the once again absent David as well as the team's third car piloted by F4 graduates Zhenrui Chi and Enea Frey. AKCEL GP meanwhile withdrew its entry into the series ahead of the Spielberg round, with Saqer Al-Maosherji moving over to G4 Racing. Prema Racing also welcomed a new driver, with Alex Powell making his Formula Regional debut as a guest driver in place of Doriane Pin. Rui-Heng Yeh did not enter the round at Spielberg and was replaced by Reno Francot, another Formula Regional debutant.

Ahead of round eight at Barcelona, Prema Racing announced it would field Mercedes junior Yuanpu Cui in the car previously piloted by Powell and Pin. Francot and Eyckmans left RPM and were replaced by the team's former drivers, FIA F3 driver Santiago Ramos and Macéo Capietto, who previously competed in round two for CL Motorsport. That team meanwhile was down to one car again as both Chi and Frey skipped the event.

RPM brought a new lineup to round nine, with Ramos and Capietto replaced by Sztuka, who had earlier competed for G4 Racing, and Eurocup-3 driver James Egozi, who made his series debut. Both Chi and Frey meanwhile returned to CL Motorsport.

For the final round of the season, RPM changed their lineup again: Sztuka and Egozi were superseded by Formula 4 graduates Tomass Štolcermanis and Jan Przyrowski. Egozi meanwhile joined Saintéloc Racing in place of Tim Gerhards, who ended his campaign a round early.

== Race calendar ==
Ten planned circuits for the 2025 season were first announced in August of 2024. The provisional calendar, with two events yet to be dated, was announced on 27 September 2024, before being finalized on 2 October 2024. Mugello was not part of the circuit lineup for the first time in series history, with the championship instead opting to return to Misano, where it last raced in 2020. Three pre-season tests were held at Barcelona, Misano and Paul Ricard.

Round		Circuit	Date	Supporting	Map of circuit locations
1	R1	(Italy) Misano World Circuit Marco Simoncelli, Misano Adriatico	3 May	Italian F4 Championship; TCR Italy Touring Car Championship	2025 Formula Regional European Championship is located in Europe
1	R2	(Italy) Misano World Circuit Marco Simoncelli, Misano Adriatico	4 May	Italian F4 Championship; TCR Italy Touring Car Championship	2025 Formula Regional European Championship is located in Europe
2	R1	(Belgium) Circuit de Spa-Francorchamps, Stavelot	17 May	International GT Open; TCR Europe Touring Car Series	2025 Formula Regional European Championship is located in Europe
2	R2	(Belgium) Circuit de Spa-Francorchamps, Stavelot	18 May	International GT Open; TCR Europe Touring Car Series	2025 Formula Regional European Championship is located in Europe
3	R1	(Netherlands) Circuit Zandvoort, Zandvoort	7 June	Deutsche Tourenwagen Masters; ADAC GT Masters	2025 Formula Regional European Championship is located in Europe
3	R2	(Netherlands) Circuit Zandvoort, Zandvoort	8 June	Deutsche Tourenwagen Masters; ADAC GT Masters	2025 Formula Regional European Championship is located in Europe
4	R1	(Hungary) Hungaroring, Mogyoród	5 July	International GT Open; Porsche Carrera Cup Benelux	2025 Formula Regional European Championship is located in Europe
4	R2	(Hungary) Hungaroring, Mogyoród	6 July	International GT Open; Porsche Carrera Cup Benelux	2025 Formula Regional European Championship is located in Europe
5	R1	(France) Circuit Paul Ricard, Le Castellet	19 July	International GT Open; GT Cup Open Europe	2025 Formula Regional European Championship is located in Europe
5	R2	(France) Circuit Paul Ricard, Le Castellet	20 July	International GT Open; GT Cup Open Europe	2025 Formula Regional European Championship is located in Europe
6	R1	(Italy) Imola Circuit, Imola	2 August	Italian GT Championship; Italian F4 Championship; TCR Italy Touring Car Championship	2025 Formula Regional European Championship is located in Europe
6	R2	(Italy) Imola Circuit, Imola	3 August	Italian GT Championship; Italian F4 Championship; TCR Italy Touring Car Championship	2025 Formula Regional European Championship is located in Europe
7	R1	(Austria) Red Bull Ring, Spielberg	6 September	International GT Open; Euroformula Open Championship; TCR Europe Touring Car Series	2025 Formula Regional European Championship is located in Europe
7	R2	(Austria) Red Bull Ring, Spielberg	7 September	International GT Open; Euroformula Open Championship; TCR Europe Touring Car Series	2025 Formula Regional European Championship is located in Europe
8	R1	(Spain) Circuit de Barcelona-Catalunya, Montmeló	20 September	International GT Open; Euroformula Open Championship; GT Cup Open Europe; Italian F4 Championship	2025 Formula Regional European Championship is located in Europe
8	R2	(Spain) Circuit de Barcelona-Catalunya, Montmeló	21 September	International GT Open; Euroformula Open Championship; GT Cup Open Europe; Italian F4 Championship	2025 Formula Regional European Championship is located in Europe
9	R1	(Germany) Hockenheimring, Hockenheim	4 October	Deutsche Tourenwagen Masters; ADAC GT Masters; ADAC GT4 Germany; Porsche Carrera Cup Germany	2025 Formula Regional European Championship is located in Europe
9	R2	(Germany) Hockenheimring, Hockenheim	5 October	Deutsche Tourenwagen Masters; ADAC GT Masters; ADAC GT4 Germany; Porsche Carrera Cup Germany	2025 Formula Regional European Championship is located in Europe
10	R1	(Italy) Monza Circuit, Monza	25 October	E4 Championship; Italian GT Championship; Porsche Carrera Cup Italia	2025 Formula Regional European Championship is located in Europe
10	R2	(Italy) Monza Circuit, Monza	26 October	E4 Championship; Italian GT Championship; Porsche Carrera Cup Italia	2025 Formula Regional European Championship is located in Europe

== Race results ==
Round		Circuit	Pole position	Fastest lap	Winning driver	Winning team	Rookie winner
1	R1	(Italy) Misano World Circuit Marco Simoncelli	(United Kingdom) Freddie Slater	(Brazil) Pedro Clerot	(Italy) Matteo De Palo	(Italy) Trident	(United Kingdom) Dion Gowda
1	R2	(Italy) Misano World Circuit Marco Simoncelli	(France) Evan Giltaire	(United Kingdom) Freddie Slater	(France) Evan Giltaire	(France) ART Grand Prix	(France) Édouard Borgna
2	R1	(Belgium) Circuit de Spa-Francorchamps	(United Kingdom) Freddie Slater (Note: Qualifying was cancelled after a crash resulted in extensive barrier repairs. The grid for the race was formed by using the times set in free practice, awarding pole position to Slater.)	(United Kingdom) Freddie Slater	(United Kingdom) Freddie Slater	(Italy) Prema Racing	(United Kingdom) Dion Gowda
2	R2	(Belgium) Circuit de Spa-Francorchamps	(United Arab Emirates) Rashid Al Dhaheri	(France) Enzo Deligny	(France) Enzo Deligny	(France) R-ace GP	(United Kingdom) Dion Gowda
3	R1	(Netherlands) Circuit Zandvoort	(Brazil) Pedro Clerot	(United Kingdom) Freddie Slater	(United Kingdom) Freddie Slater	(Italy) Prema Racing	(United Kingdom) Dion Gowda
3	R2	(Netherlands) Circuit Zandvoort	(Brazil) Pedro Clerot	(Japan) Jin Nakamura	(Brazil) Pedro Clerot	(Netherlands) Van Amersfoort Racing	(United Kingdom) Dion Gowda
4	R1	(Hungary) Hungaroring	(Italy) Matteo De Palo	(Italy) Matteo De Palo	(Italy) Matteo De Palo	(Italy) Trident	(United Kingdom) Dion Gowda
4	R2	(Hungary) Hungaroring	(France) Enzo Deligny	(United Arab Emirates) Rashid Al Dhaheri	(United Kingdom) Freddie Slater	(Italy) Prema Racing	(Belgium) Ean Eyckmans
5	R1	(France) Circuit Paul Ricard	(United Kingdom) Freddie Slater	(United Kingdom) Freddie Slater	(United Kingdom) Freddie Slater	(Italy) Prema Racing	(United Kingdom) Dion Gowda
5	R2	(France) Circuit Paul Ricard	(United Kingdom) Freddie Slater	(United Arab Emirates) Rashid Al Dhaheri	(United Kingdom) Freddie Slater	(Italy) Prema Racing	(United Kingdom) Dion Gowda
6	R1	(Italy) Imola Circuit	(France) Enzo Deligny	(Japan) Jin Nakamura	(France) Enzo Deligny	(France) R-ace GP	(United Kingdom) Dion Gowda
6	R2	(Italy) Imola Circuit	(India) Akshay Bohra	(India) Akshay Bohra	(India) Akshay Bohra	(France) R-ace GP	(Belgium) Ean Eyckmans
7	R1	(Austria) Red Bull Ring	(Italy) Matteo De Palo	(Japan) Jin Nakamura	(Italy) Matteo De Palo	(Italy) Trident	(Belgium) Ean Eyckmans
7	R2	(Austria) Red Bull Ring	(Brazil) Pedro Clerot	(United Arab Emirates) Rashid Al Dhaheri	(Brazil) Pedro Clerot	(Netherlands) Van Amersfoort Racing	(Netherlands) Reno Francot
8	R1	(Spain) Circuit de Barcelona-Catalunya	(United Kingdom) Freddie Slater	(Italy) Matteo De Palo	(Italy) Matteo De Palo	(Italy) Trident	(United Kingdom) Dion Gowda
8	R2	(Spain) Circuit de Barcelona-Catalunya	(France) Enzo Deligny	(France) Enzo Deligny	(France) Enzo Deligny	(France) R-ace GP	(United Kingdom) Dion Gowda
9	R1	(Germany) Hockenheimring	(Italy) Matteo De Palo (Note: Enzo Deligny recorded the fastest time in qualifying, but got a four-place grid penalty for having a second reprimand in the previous round. Fastest time of the other group, Matteo De Palo started the race on pole position.)	(United Kingdom) Freddie Slater	(United Kingdom) Freddie Slater	(Italy) Prema Racing	(United Kingdom) Dion Gowda
9	R2	(Germany) Hockenheimring	(France) Enzo Deligny	(Italy) Matteo De Palo	(France) Enzo Deligny	(France) R-ace GP	(United Kingdom) Dion Gowda
10	R1	(Italy) Monza Circuit	(France) Evan Giltaire	(United Kingdom) Freddie Slater	(United Kingdom) Freddie Slater	(Italy) Prema Racing	(United Kingdom) Dion Gowda
10	R2	(Italy) Monza Circuit	(United Kingdom) Freddie Slater	(United Kingdom) Freddie Slater	(United Kingdom) Freddie Slater	(Italy) Prema Racing	(Poland) Jan Przyrowski

== Season report ==
=== Opening rounds ===
The 2025 Formula Regional European Championship began with the series' return to Misano Circuit, and Prema's Freddie Slater set the pace in the opening qualifying session to secure pole position for the first race ahead of Trident’s Matteo De Palo. However, Slater lost the lead off the line at the start of the first race. He was then tagged into a spin by R-ace GP’s Jin Nakamura at Turn 1, eliminating both and bringing out the safety car. De Palo inherited first place ahead of ART Grand Prix’s Evan Giltaire and maintained a stable gap of around two seconds to the flag to claim Trident’s maiden Formula Regional Europe win. Prema's Rashid Al Dhaheri finished third. Giltaire then topped the second qualifying session to start from pole position for race two, ahead of Slater. In a race punctuated by three safety car periods following separate incidents for RPM's Giovanni Maschio, VAR's Dion Gowda and Saintéloc's Tim Gerhards, Giltaire led every lap to take victory ahead of Slater and De Palo to leave the first round leading the championship.

Qualifying for race one at Spa was abandoned after AKCEL GP's Saqer Al-Maosherji crashed and track repairs were needed. With Group B unable to run, the grid was set from free practice times, handing Slater pole position ahead of R-ace GP's Enzo Deligny. At the start, Deligny snatched the lead on the Kemmel Straight before a safety car neutralised the race. Slater reclaimed the advantage on lap eight after briefly cutting Les Combes earlier and yielding the position back. De Palo moved into second to complete the podium three laps from the end, passing Deligny in identical fashion. Sunday’s qualifying saw Al Dhaheri secure pole with in foggy conditions, ahead of VAR's Hiyu Yamakoshi. In race two, Deligny overtook both of them before Les Combes before the first of multiple safety cars interrupted proceedings. Yamakoshi moved back to the front later on, briefly leading the race, but finished second as Deligny secured victory. ART Grand Prix's Taito Kato finished third, while misfortune for Slater and Giltaire saw De Palo claim the championship lead.

VAR's Pedro Clerot secured his maiden pole position in mixed conditions in qualifying at Zandvoort. Slater started third and made the fastest launch in race one to move between Clerot and R-ace GP's Akshay Bohra into Tarzan and take the lead before a safety car appeared for a collision between G4 Racing's Édouard Borgna and AKCEL GP's Aditya Kulkarni. He controlled the restart and, after a second neutralisation caused by Saintéloc's Nikita Bedrin stopping on track, held position to win, while Clerot resisted sustained pressure from Bohra to finish second by 0.029 seconds. Clerot then claimed another pole position in qualifying for race two ahead of Yamakoshi, with Slater third. In the race, Clerot maintained the lead through an early safety-car period for Gerhards’s stoppage and headed a VAR one-two, with Yamakoshi holding off Slater, who in turn kept Deligny at bay. Slater ended the weekend as the third different championship leader in as many rounds, leading the standings on 83 points, five ahead of De Palo on 78.

=== Mid-season rounds ===
Qualifying at the Hungaroring brought another maiden polesitter in De Palo, who secured pole position for race one ahead of Clerot. In the first race, he kept the lead into turn one, while Deligny passed Al Dhaheri for third. De Palo maintained control through two safety-car periods, leaving only a single green-flag lap. Clerot resisted repeated attacks from Deligny for second, and Al Dhaheri kept Slater at bay for fourth. De Palo won ahead of Clerot and Deligny to retake the championship lead. Deligny earned pole position for race two, but after leading the early laps he ceded the position on lap 13 when he slowed unexpectedly before turn 12 and Slater moved past. Deligny briefly retook the lead into turn one but dropped behind Slater, Al Dhaheri and De Palo when the same issue recurred. Slater managed the remaining laps to win. Deligny initially recovered to second, but a technical infringement saw him disqualified after the race. De Palo therefore moved up to third to retain a three-point championship lead over Slater.

The first half of the season concluded at Paul Ricard, where Slater led De Palo in qualifying for the first race. He controlled race one from the start and steadily extended his advantage, eventually winning by 7.9 seconds. The top two remained steady as CL Motorsport's Michael Belov moved into third at the start. That place was short-lived, however, as Kato retook the place around the outside on lap two. Bohra and Clerot also passed Belov as the race settled, with the pair fighting for fourth place, allowing Kato to retain the podium. Slater started race two from pole position again, this time ahead of Rashid Al Dhaheri, who defended from Bohra on the opening lap. A collision between Prema's Doriane Pin and Maschio at turn one brought out the safety car and then the red flag, with racing resuming on lap eight. Slater retained control at the restart, while De Palo’s attempt to pass Bohra ended with an off-track excursion that allowed Clerot and then Giltaire through. Slater's double win saw him leave Paul Ricard with a 20-point lead over De Palo.

Round six at Imola saw Deligny claim pole position for the first race. The Frenchman led away in race one as Slater slipped momentarily behind Clerot and Bohra; early incidents for Hiyu Yamakoshi and CL Motorsport's Zachary David brought out a red flag and the race was further interrupted by two safety-car periods, including one for Al Dhaheri’s late exit. Deligny managed both restarts and took the victory, Slater recovered to finish second and Bohra completed the podium, while De Palo finished in the top five. Bohra then edged Slater to take pole position for race two. He kept the lead from the start despite wheelspin, but the race was neutralised twice following heavy incidents involving Maschio and then contact between Nakamura and Prema's Jack Beeton. Bohra won, with Slater crossing the line second, but he was disqualified after the race for a technical infringement. That promoted De Palo to second and elevated Bedrin to third. Slater’s exclusion reduced his championship cushion to 15 points over De Palo, with Deligny remaining third.

The Red Bull Ring hosted round seven, and qualifying saw Slater's woes continue: A lap time deletion saw him qualify 18th for the opening race, while pole position went to De Palo. The Italian led Bohra and Clerot, before Bedrin took third and a safety car interrupted the race. Bohra dropped down the order after the restart, allowing Bedrin into second and Deligny onto the podium, but no one challenged De Palo as he drove to victory, reclaiming the championship lead in the process. Qualifying for the second race saw Clerot claim pole position ahead of Deligny, with Slater starting sixth and De Palo eleventh. De Palo's race unravelled right at the start, after heavy defending from Bohra ahead saw him sustain damage. He finished the race three laps down after multiple pit stops for repairs. At the front, Clerot defended his lead from Deligny as Nakamura slotted into third. That order remained static until the finish, with Clerot winning the race as Slater took fourth place to retake a three-point championship lead over De Palo.

=== Closing rounds ===
Slater beat De Palo by 0.029 seconds in qualifying for the first race at Circuit de Barcelona-Catalunya. That race started with four cars side-by-side into the first corner, with De Palo slotting into the lead, Slater consigned into second and Nakamura taking third. The Japanese lost that place to Clerot on lap four, with the Brazilian then attacking Slater for second, allowing De Palo to build a gap. Clerot attempted a move on Slater on lap 18, but could not find a way past, and the order at the front remained static afterwards. De Palo's win saw him move back into the championship lead. Qualifying for race two was held in heavy rain, and Deligny claimed pole position. The race was started behind the safety car, which was called back out straight away after a crash. Deligny spent the race fending off Clerot, holding on to claim victory, with Bohra third. Slater looked set to finish fourth, before running off track and dropping to fifth. With De Palo finishing second, that saw the two title protagonists now level on points with four races left in the season.

The penultimate round was held at the Hockenheimring, where Deligny set the fastest time in qualifying for race one, but a grid penalty saw De Palo inherit pole position ahead of Bohra. Rain ahead of the race caused a safety car start, and when it was withdrawn, Slater started moving up the order. He started fourth, moved past Deligny on the first green flag lap, before attacking and passing Bohra on lap nine. The top two then began to battle, both ran wide and dropped behind Bohra. Slater was now ahead of De Palo, and he reclaimed the lead to take victory. Deligny led De Palo again in the second qualifying session. It rained again before the race, causing slippery conditions. Deligny converted his pole position into the lead, heading De Palo through an early safety car as Giltaire moved into third. A second safety car was called later on, under which heavy rain started to fall. That prompted a red flag, and the race was not resumed, awarding Deligny victory and allowing De Palo to close the championship gap to Slater to four points.

Monza hosted the season final, and Slater topped his group in the first qualifying session to start second, only behind Giltaire, while De Palo lined up in ninth. The Italian's race began with a collision that caused damage to his front wing, necessitating a pit stop and dropping him to the back of the field. He began fighting back up the order while Slater attacked Giltaire for the lead, eventually taking it in the final stages of the race. De Palo used two safety car phases to climb back up the order, but eleventh place at the finish was not enough to deny Slater, who won ahead of Giltaire and Clerot, the title with a race to spare. Fresh off the back of that success, Slater took pole position for the season final, leading De Palo. The championship top two battled all race, with the newly crowned champion coming out on top when the race finished under safety car conditions to round out his campaign with another win. De Palo took second, matching his place in the standings, while Giltaire took third after having been in that position all race.

Slater entered Formula Regional as a double Formula 4 champion, making him a title favorite despite failing to take the Formula Regional Middle East Championship title earlier in the year. And despite taking eight wins, four further podiums and six pole positions on the way to a deserved title success, his campaign was far from straightforward. Two retirements in the opening four races, a disqualification in Imola and a non-score at the Red Bull Ring kept sophomore driver De Palo right on his tail all year long, with the pair trading the championship lead seven times across the season. Still, Slater delivered when it mattered, scoring a brilliant double win at the season final to deny De Palo any chance at claiming the title, even without the misfortune that happened to the Italian in the penultimate race of the year.

== Championship standings ==
Points system

Points were awarded to the top 10 classified finishers.

Position	**1st**	**2nd**	**3rd**	**4th**	**5th**	**6th**	**7th**	**8th**	**9th**	**10th**
Points	25	18	15	12	10	8	6	4	2	1

=== Drivers' standings ===
Pos.	Driver	MIS (Italy)		SPA (Belgium)		ZAN (Netherlands)		HUN (Hungary)		LEC (France)		IMO (Italy)		RBR (Austria)		CAT (Spain)		HOC (Germany)		MNZ (Italy)		Points
Pos.	Driver	R1	R2	R1	R2	R1	R2	R1	R2	R1	R2	R1	R2	R1	R2	R1	R2	R1	R2	R1	R2	Points
1	(United Kingdom) Freddie Slater	**Ret**	2	**1**	Ret	1	3	5	1	**1**	**1**	2	DSQ	12	4	**2**	5	1	4	1	**1**	313
2	(Italy) Matteo De Palo	1	3	2	6	6	6	**1**	3	2	6	5	4	**1**	Ret	1	7	**3**	2	11	2	277
3	(France) Enzo Deligny	10	4	3	1	5	4	3	**DSQ**	7	10	**1**	2	3	2	Ret	**1**	5	**1**	9	21	235
4	(Brazil) Pedro Clerot	4	5	25	16	**2**	**1**	2	10	5	4	4	5	4	**1**	3	2	6	7	3	7	235
5	(France) Evan Giltaire	2	**1**	4	13	4	16	7	5	9	7	15	6	9	7	7	4	4	3	**2**	3	185
6	(India) Akshay Bohra	9	14	7	15	3	9	8	4	4	3	3	**1**	5	12	12	3	2	8	Ret	10	159
7	(France) Taito Kato	5	17	10	3	15	8	12	9	3	13	6	8	14	14	6	8	9	6	4	4	107
8	(United Arab Emirates) Rashid Al Dhaheri	3	15	6	**12**	8	13	4	2	DNS	2	Ret	12	7	5	8	18	12	12	5	20	105
9	(Japan) Hiyu Yamakoshi	8	9	5	2	7	2	6	8	6	12	Ret	11	6	11	Ret	15	14	24	Ret	Ret	86
10	(Japan) Jin Nakamura	Ret	10	16	7	13	5	13	25	8	5	25	Ret	8	3	4	9	7	10	Ret	6	81
11	(Italy) Nikita Bedrin	7	6	15	9	Ret	10	DSQ	Ret	14	8	7	3	2	8	11	14	27	Ret	6	Ret	72
12	(United Kingdom) Dion Gowda	17	Ret	14	5	10	7	10	15	16	16	8	15	13	13	13	13	17	5	7	Ret	38
13	(Australia) Jack Beeton	6	7	8	10	9	17	14	Ret	10	Ret	21	Ret	23	6	9	11	18	14	Ret	DNS	32
14	(Japan) Kanato Le	11	16	9	4	12	12	11	6	Ret	11	9	19	18	16	10	10	10	9	14	19	30
15	(Kyrgyzstan) Michael Belov			12	Ret	11	20	15	7	11	17	10	7	11	17	15	6	20	13	Ret	8	27
16	(Thailand) Nandhavud Bhirombhakdi	12	8	17	17	16	14	9	11	15	9	16	22	15	9	5	22	16	23	8	16	24
17	(Italy) Giovanni Maschio	16	Ret	13	8	23	25	16	23	12	Ret	18	Ret	20	20	21	Ret	15	25	15	12	6
18	(China) Ruiqi Liu	14	12	18	14	19	15	20	21	13	21	14	9	17	19	16	12	11	Ret	10	14	4
19	(Belgium) Ean Eyckmans							Ret	12	22	Ret	17	10	10	15							2
20	(Netherlands) Reno Francot													16	10							1
21	(Spain) Edu Robinson							Ret	24	21	18	12	13	19	18	17	16	19	15	16	13	1
22	(France) Enzo Peugeot	13	11	11	11	14	11															0
23	(Chinese Taipei) Rui-Heng Yeh	15	21	23	18	18	18	18	13	23	14	11	16									0
24	(Poland) Kacper Sztuka	18	13									13	21					21	16			0
25	(Switzerland) Enea Frey													Ret	27†			22	19	13	Ret	0
26	(Malta) Zachary David							17	16	18	15	Ret	14									0
27	(United Kingdom) Aditya Kulkarni	21	DNS	21	20	Ret	21	DSQ	14			19	18									0
28	(Kuwait) Saqer Al-Maosherji	22	19	DNS	23	21	19	Ret	20			24	24	24	26	24	21	28†	26	19	15	0
29	(Netherlands) Tim Gerhards	Ret	Ret	20	21	17	Ret			20	19	20	17	21	23	20	19	23	18			0
30	(France) Doriane Pin			19	Ret	20	24	19	17	17	Ret											0
31	(France) Édouard Borgna	19	18	22	Ret	Ret	22	23	22	19	20	22	25	26	24	22	23	25	21	17	18	0
32	(France) Macéo Capietto			Ret	19											19	17					0
33	(Italy) Zhenrui Chi													Ret	22			24	17			0
34	(Ukraine) Yaroslav Veselaho			24	22	22	23	21	18	DNS	22	23	23	25	25	23	24	26	22	18	17	0
35	(Luxembourg) Enzo Richer							24	19													0
36	(France) Arthur Aegerter	23	20	26	24	WD	WD			Ret	DNS											0
37	(Spain) Javier Sagrera							DSQ	26			Ret	20									0
38	(Italy) Valerio Rinicella	20	Ret																			0
39	(Netherlands) Maya Weug							22	Ret													0
guest drivers ineligible to score
—	(Poland) Jan Przyrowski																			12	5	0
—	(United States) James Egozi																	8	11	Ret	11	0
—	(Latvia) Tomass Štolcermanis																			Ret	9	0
—	(China) Yuanpu Cui															18	25	13	20			0
—	(Mexico) Santiago Ramos															14	20					0
—	(United States) Alex Powell													22	21							0
Pos.	Driver	R1	R2	R1	R2	R1	R2	R1	R2	R1	R2	R1	R2	R1	R2	R1	R2	R1	R2	R1	R2	Points
Pos.	Driver	MIS (Italy)		SPA (Belgium)		ZAN (Netherlands)		HUN (Hungary)		LEC (France)		IMO (Italy)		RBR (Austria)		CAT (Spain)		HOC (Germany)		MNZ (Italy)		Points

Colour	Result
Gold	Winner
Silver	Second place
Bronze	Third place
Green	Points classification
Blue	Non-points classification
Blue	Non-classified finish (NC)
Purple	Retired, not classified (Ret)
Red	Did not qualify (DNQ)
Red	Did not pre-qualify (DNPQ)
Black	Disqualified (DSQ)
White	Did not start (DNS)
White	Withdrew (WD)
White	Race cancelled (C)
Blank	Did not practice (DNP)
Blank	Did not arrive (DNA)
Blank	Excluded (EX)

**Bold** – Pole

Italics – Fastest Lap

† – Did not finish, but classified (completed more than 90% of the race distance)

Rookie

=== Teams' standings ===
For teams entering more than two cars, only the two best-finishing cars were eligible to score points in the teams' championship.

Pos.	Team	MIS (Italy)		SPA (Belgium)		ZAN (Netherlands)		HUN (Hungary)		LEC (France)		IMO (Italy)		RBR (Austria)		CAT (Spain)		HOC (Germany)		MNZ (Italy)		Points
Pos.	Team	R1	R2	R1	R2	R1	R2	R1	R2	R1	R2	R1	R2	R1	R2	R1	R2	R1	R2	R1	R2	Points
1	(France) R-ace GP	9	4	3	1	3	4	3	4	4	3	1	1	3	2	4	1	2	1	9	6	455
1	(France) R-ace GP	10	10	7	7	5	5	8	25	7	5	3	2	5	3	12	3	5	8	Ret	10	455
2	(Italy) Prema Racing	3	2	1	10	1	3	4	1	1	1	2	12	7	4	2	5	1	4	1	1	434
2	(Italy) Prema Racing	6	7	6	12	8	13	5	2	10	2	21	Ret	12	5	8	11	12	12	5	20	434
3	(Netherlands) Van Amersfoort Racing	4	5	5	2	2	1	2	8	5	4	4	5	4	1	3	2	6	5	3	7	351
3	(Netherlands) Van Amersfoort Racing	8	9	14	5	7	2	6	10	6	12	8	11	6	11	13	13	14	7	7	Ret	351
4	(France) ART Grand Prix	2	1	4	3	4	8	7	5	3	7	6	6	9	7	6	4	4	3	2	3	313
4	(France) ART Grand Prix	5	16	9	4	15	12	11	6	9	11	9	8	14	14	7	8	9	6	4	4	313
5	(Italy) Trident	1	3	2	6	6	6	1	3	2	6	5	4	1	9	1	7	3	2	8	2	305
5	(Italy) Trident	12	8	17	14	16	14	9	11	13	9	14	9	15	19	5	12	11	23	10	14	305
6	(France) Saintéloc Racing	7	6	15	9	17	10	21	18	14	8	7	3	2	8	11	17	23	18	6	11	72
6	(France) Saintéloc Racing	Ret	Ret	20	21	22	23	22	Ret	20	19	20	17	21	23	20	18	26	22	18	17	72
7	(Italy) CL Motorsport	20	Ret	12	19	11	20	15	7	11	15	10	7	11	17	15	6	20	13	13	8	27
7	(Italy) CL Motorsport			Ret	Ret			17	16	18	17	Ret	14	Ret	22			22	17	Ret	Ret	27
8	(Italy) RPM	13	11	11	8	14	11	16	12	12	14	11	10	10	10	14	15	8	11	12	12	9
8	(Italy) RPM	15	21	13	11	18	18	18	13	22	Ret	17	16	16	15	19	19	20	13	16	5	9
9	(Switzerland) G4 Racing	18	13	22	24	Ret	22	23	19	19	18	12	13	19	18	17	20	19	15	15	13	1
9	(Switzerland) G4 Racing	19	18	26	Ret	WD	WD	27	22	21	20	13	21	24	26	22	21	25	21	17	18	1
10	(United Arab Emirates) AKCEL GP	21	19	21	20	21	19	Ret	14			19	18									0
10	(United Arab Emirates) AKCEL GP	22	DNS	DNS	23	Ret	21	DSQ	20			24	20									0
Pos.	Team	R1	R2	R1	R2	R1	R2	R1	R2	R1	R2	R1	R2	R1	R2	R1	R2	R1	R2	R1	R2	Points
Pos.	Team	MIS (Italy)		SPA (Belgium)		ZAN (Netherlands)		HUN (Hungary)		LEC (France)		IMO (Italy)		RBR (Austria)		CAT (Spain)		HOC (Germany)		MNZ (Italy)		Points
