= 2019 FIA Motorsport Games Karting Slalom Cup =

FIA sanctioned Motorsport event that happened in 2019

Race details
| Date | 1-3 November |
| Official name | FIA Motorsport Games Karting Slalom Cup |
| Location | Campagnano di Roma, Italy |
- Medalists
| 1st place, gold medalist(s) | (Netherlands) Nina Pothof (Netherlands) Bastiaan van Loenen | Team Netherlands |
| 2nd place, silver medalist(s) | (Belgium) Manon Degotte (Belgium) Antoine Morlet | Team Belgium |
| 3rd place, bronze medalist(s) | (Russia) Olesya Vashchuk (Russia) Vladislav Bushuev | Team Russia |

The 2019 FIA Motorsport Games Karting Slalom Cup was the first FIA Motorsport Games Karting Slalom Cup, to be held at ACI Vallelunga Circuit, Italy on 1 November to 3 November 2019. The race will be contested with identical electric-powered karts The event was the part of the 2019 FIA Motorsport Games.

Drivers raced around the cones, receiving penalty seconds for every cone knocked off.

== Entry list ==
All entered drivers aged between 14 and 16 and competed with identical electric-powered karts.

| Team | No. | Driver A (Female) | Driver B (Male) |
|---|---|---|---|
| Team Albania | 1 | Alexia Karaguni | Kristofor Mjeshtri |
| Team Austria | 2 | Jorden Dolischka | Charlie Wurz |
| Team Belgium | 3 | Manon Degotte | Antoine Morlet |
| Team Belarus | 4 | Kseniya Shuba | Aliaksei Savin |
| Team Germany | 5 | Janina Burkard | Florian Vietze |
| Team Denmark | 6 | Sarah Kronborg Madsen | Jonas Jakobsen |
| Team France | 7 | Doriane Pin | Esteban Masson |
| (United Kingdom) Team UK | 8 | Jessica Edgar | Samuel Shaw |
| (Georgia (country)) Team Georgia | 9 | Elizaveta Bagramovi | Nika Kobosnidze |
| Team Hungary | 10 | Dorka Kiss | Bálint Németh |
| Team Croatia | 11 | Stefani Mogoroviić | Sandro Ivanjko |
| Team India | 12 | Shravanthika Lakshmi Shyam Kumar | Suriyavarathan Karthikeyan |
| Team Israel | 13 | Yarven Oved | Ben Pinto |
| Team Italy | 14 | Emma Segattini | Paolo Gallo |
| Team Kuwait | 15 | Hessa Alfares | Marshad Almarshad |
| Team Lithuania | 16 | Skaistė Petrauskaitė | Kajus Šikšnelis |
| Team Latvia | 17 | Emīlija Bertāne | Nicolass Bertāns |
| Team Mexico | 18 | Andrea Sierra Ruíz | lavio Emil Bustamante Abed |
| Team Netherlands | 19 | Nina Pothof | Bastiaan van Loenen |
| Team Norway | 20 | Mina Louise Nielsen Pedersen | Marcus Myrseth |
| Team Poland | 21 | Sara Sandra Kałuzińska | Krzysztof Gardziel |
| Team Portugal | 22 | Matilde Fidalgo | Martim Fidalgo |
| Team Russia | 23 | Olesya Vashchuk | Vladislav Bushuev |
| Team Serbia | 24 | Aleksa Lazarac | Nikola Tošić |
| Team Slovakia | 25 | Barbora Bauerová | Michal Vilim |
| Team Sweden | 26 | Anna Glaerum | Alexander Spetz |
| Team Thailand | 27 | Sitavee Limnantharak | Ananthorn Tangniannatchai |
| Team Ukraine | 28 | Veronika Kononenko | Heorhii Krasko |

=== Qualifying ===
Drivers qualified for the 1/16 highlighted in green.

| Pos. | No. | Team | Time | Gap |
|---|---|---|---|---|
| 1 | 9 | (Georgia (country)) Team Georgia | 3:37.903 | — |
| 2 | 5 | Team Germany | 3:45.141 | +7.238 |
| 3 | 3 | Team Belgium | 3:45.184 | +7.281 |
| 4 | 4 | Team Belarus | 3:47.160 | +9.257 |
| 5 | 23 | Team Russia | 3:48.889 | +10.986 |
| 6 | 11 | Team Croatia | 3:49.021 | +11.118 |
| 7 | 17 | Team Latvia | 3:50.841 | +12.938 |
| 8 | 21 | Team Poland | 3:50.866 | +12.963 |
| 9 | 19 | Team Netherlands | 3:56.154 | +18.251 |
| 10 | 22 | Team Portugal | 4:06.237 | +28.334 |
| 11 | 14 | Team Italy | 4:08.413 | +30.510 |
| 12 | 15 | Team Kuwait | 4:09.104 | +31.201 |
| 13 | 28 | Team Ukraine | 4:22.327 | +44.424 |
| 14 | 16 | Team Lithuania | 4:24.497 | +46.594 |
| 15 | 25 | Team Slovakia | 4:31.652 | +53.749 |
| 16 | 2 | Team Austria | 4:37.095 | +59.192 |
| 17 | 10 | Team Hungary | 4:38.854 | +1:00.951 |
| 18 | 7 | Team France | 4:48.915 | +1:11.012 |
| 19 | 26 | Team Sweden | 5:02.599 | +1:24.696 |
| 20 | 13 | Team Israel | 5:10.032 | +1:32.129 |
| 21 | 24 | Team Serbia | 5:13.161 | +1:35.258 |
| 22 | 18 | Team Mexico | 5:16.658 | +1:38.755 |
| 23 | 8 | (United Kingdom) Team UK | 5:17.945 | +1:40.042 |
| 24 | 27 | Team Thailand | 5:23.245 | +1:45.342 |
| 25 | 1 | Team Albania | 5:24.389 | +1:46.486 |
| 26 | 20 | Team Norway | 5:24.888 | +1:46.985 |
| 27 | 6 | Team Denmark | 5:30.649 | +1:52.746 |
| 28 | 12 | Team India | 5:42.983 | +2:05.080 |

=== Knock-out stages and final ===
Round of 16
Team Latvia | 4:26.556
Team Portugal | 4:14.356
Team Germany | 3:19.256
Team Slovakia | 3:53.914
Team Austria | 3:41.921
(Georgia (country)) Team Georgia | 3:53.937
Team Netherlands | 3:26.893
Team Poland | 3:28.661
Team Kuwait | 4:19.594
Team Russia | 3:23.388
Team Croatia | 3:48.514
Team Italy | 3:52.531
Team Belgium | 3:32.235
Team Lithuania | 4:17.103
Team Belarus | 3:38.531
Team Ukraine | 4:04.338

Quarterfinals
Team Portugal | 3:30.480
Team Germany | 3:31.211
Team Austria | 4:08.390
Team Netherlands | 3:44.523
Team Russia | 3:36.938
Team Croatia | 3:52.618
Team Belgium | 3:30.517
Team Belarus | 4:04.269

Semi-finals
Team Portugal | 4:04.942
Team Netherlands | 3:45.512
Team Russia | 3:53.362
Team Belgium | 3:40.611

Final
Team Netherlands (gold) | 3:21.318
Team Belgium (silver) | 3:25.243
Third place play-off
Team Russia (bronze) | 3:34.791
Team Portugal | 3:44.853
