= The Pocket (Floyd County, Georgia) =

Valley and basin in the Georgia, United States

Coordinates: 34.58°N 85.08°W

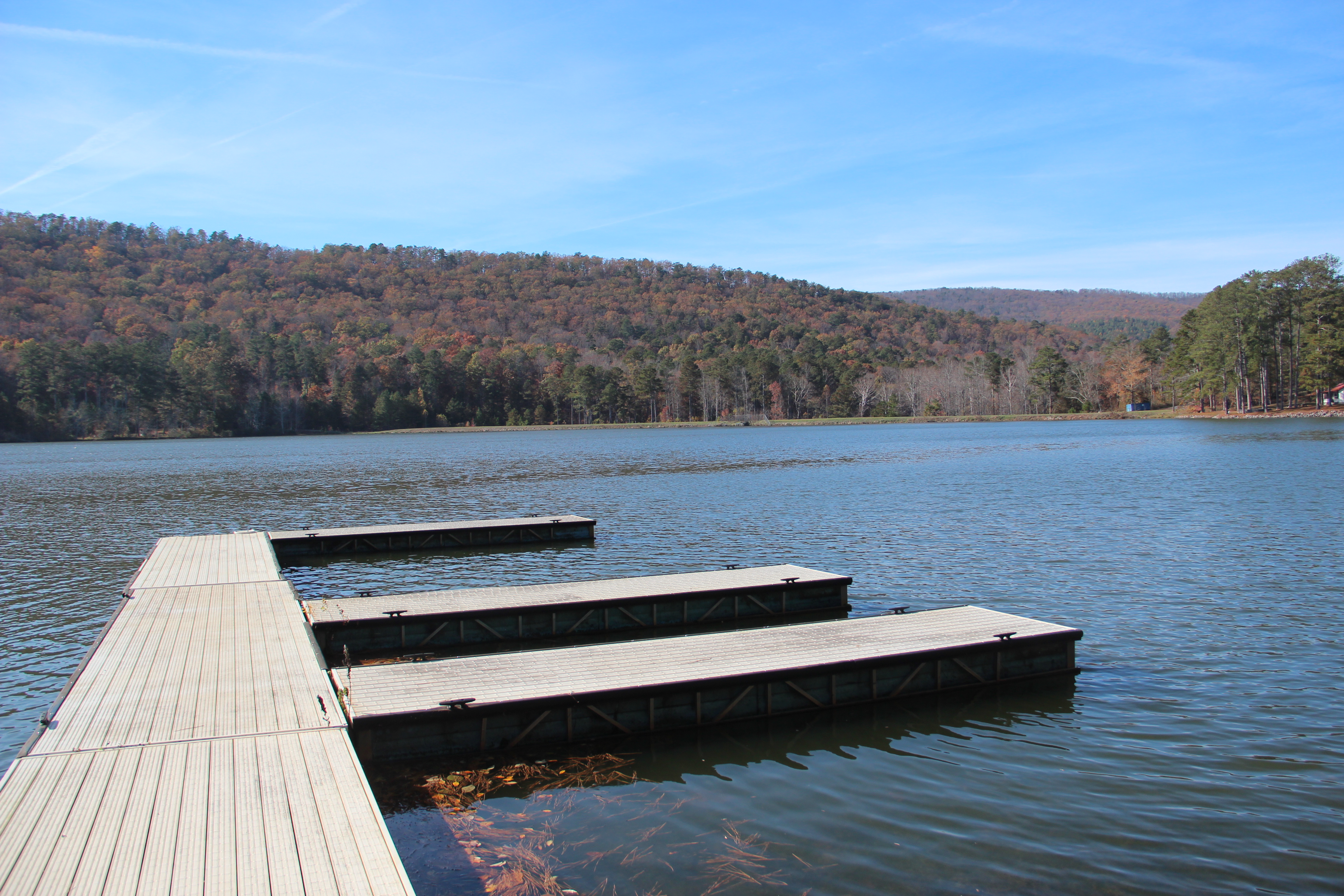
Lake Marvin, a reservoir in the Pocket

The Pocket is a basin in northern Floyd County, Georgia. The valley was named as such due to how Horn Mountain curved in a way that it formed a pocket.

== Geography ==
The Pocket is a basin located in the northeast portion of Floyd County, Georgia, about 21 miles (34 km) north-northeast of Rome and 4 miles (6.4 km) west of Sugar Valley. The valley, located in the Ridge-and-Valley Appalachians, is bounded to the south and east by Horn Mountain and to the west by Mill Mountain and Johns Mountain. Bodies of water inside the Pocket include Pocket Creek and Lake Marvin. The basin is located in the Conasauga District of the Chattahoochee National Forest. The facilities at The Pocket include a campground, picnic area, and hiking trails. There is a cool water creek in which visitors can fish for trout.

Like most of Northwest Georgia, the area known as The Pocket was once covered by a vast sea. The valley was formed when weaker limestone eroded and left the surrounding iron ore ridges.

== History ==
Cemeteries and headstones have existed in the Pocket since before the American Civil War. A watermill, cotton gin and a sawmill also used to exist in the valley.

A Civilian Conservation Corps camp (The Pocket Camp, F-16, Company 3435) was founded in the Pocket in 1938. By 1941, as the problem of unemployment diminished, funding for the CCC was discontinued and the Pocket Camp was closed. The camp's buildings were demolished following the closure; only the foundation of the springhouse and the floor of a large shower house still exist.

== See also ==
- Pocket Creek
