= Pocket Creek =

Stream in Floyd County, Georgia, U.S.

Coordinates: 34.5377778°N 85.0780556°W

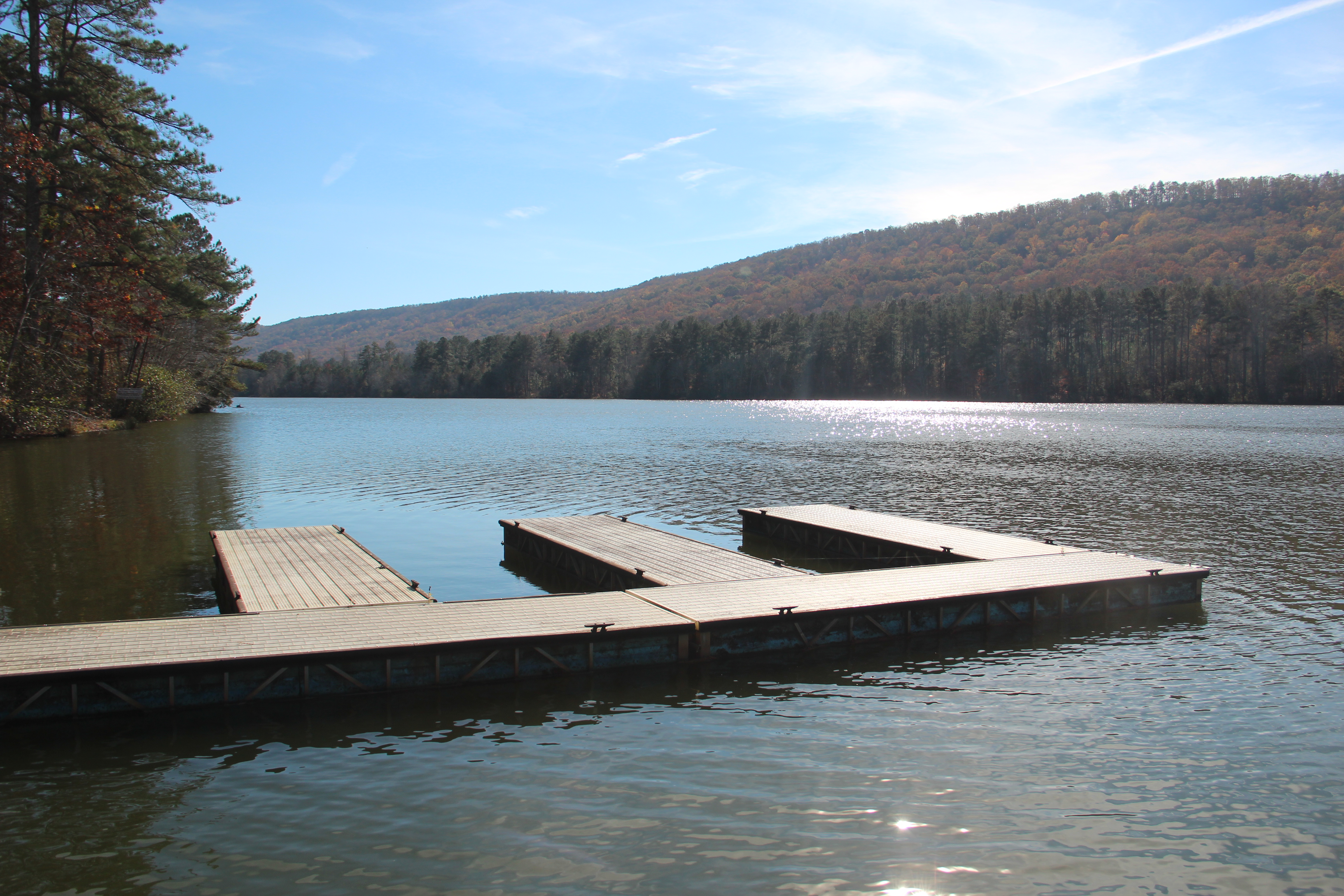
Lake Marvin, a reservoir on Pocket Creek

Pocket Creek is a stream in Floyd County, in the U.S. state of Georgia.

Pocket Creek was so named from a bend, or "pocket", in the river valley. The stream was formed from springs inside this valley.

== See also ==
- List of rivers of Georgia (U.S. state)
- Lake Marvin
- The Pocket (Floyd County, Georgia)
