= Robert Sovík =

Czech ice hockey player

- Born: July 1, 1991 (age 34) Prague, Czechoslovakia
- Height: 5 ft 11 in (180 cm)
- Weight: 180 lb (82 kg; 12 st 12 lb)
- Position: Forward
- Shoots: Left
- team Former teams: Free agent HC Sparta Praha
- Playing career: 2011–present

Robert Sovík (born July 1, 1991) is a Czech professional ice hockey left winger.

Sovík played eight games with HC Sparta Praha in the Czech Extraliga during the 2010–11 Czech Extraliga season. He also spent three seasons at Hobart College from 2012 to 2015.
