= Doriane Pin =

French racing driver (born 2004)

- Pin at Silverstone Circuit in 2026
- Nationality: (France) French
- Born: 6 January 2004 (age 22) Ivry-sur-Seine, Val-de-Marne, France

European Le Mans Series career
- Debut season: 2022
- Current team: Duqueine Team
- Categorisation: FIA Silver
- Car number: 30
- Former teams: Iron Lynx
- Starts: 9
- Wins: 1
- Podiums: 4
- Poles: 0
- Fastest laps: 1
- Best finish: 4th in 2026 (LMP2 Pro-Am)

Previous series
- 2024–2025; 2024–2025; 2024; 2023; 2022–2024; 2021–2023; 2021–2022; 2021; 2020: FRECA; F1 Academy; F4 UAE; F4 South East Asia; FIA WEC; GTWC Europe; Ferrari Challenge Europe; Le Mans Cup; Renault Clio Cup France

Championship titles
- 2025 2022: F1 Academy; Ferrari Challenge Europe - Trofeo Pirelli (Pro)

Awards
- 2022, 2025; 2023: FFSA Volant d'Or; FIA WEC Revelation of the Year

Doriane Pin (born 6 January 2004) is a French racing driver who most recently competed in the LMP2 Pro-Am class of the European Le Mans Series for the Duqueine Team. She also currently serves as a development driver for Mercedes in Formula One, Peugeot in WEC, and Citroën in Formula E.

Nicknamed Pocket Rocket owing to her small stature, Pin has been an Iron Dame since 2021. She won the entry-level Ferrari Challenge Europe in 2022, followed by class wins in the Spa 24 Hours and ELMS, and made her LMP2 debut for Prema Racing in 2023. In single-seater racing, Pin raced in FRECA and won F1 Academy in 2025. She returned to LMP2 with Duqueine in 2026.

== Early career ==
=== Karting ===
Having started karting at the age of nine, Pin began competing in the national championship in 2016. She remained in the competition for the next three years, finishing tenth and fifth respectively in the junior class before winning the female category in 2019. Pin also took part in the FIA Motorsport Games in the Karting Slalom Cup with Esteban Masson.

=== Renault Clio Cup ===
In 2020, Pin made her car racing debut, competing for GPA Racing in Renault Clio Cup France. She drove in the first three events of the campaign, finishing second in the junior category with a best finish of ninth.

=== Le Mans Cup ===
Progressing to full-time competition in 2021, Pin moved into the GT3 class of the Le Mans Cup, racing for Iron Lynx alongside Sarah Bovy and Manuela Gostner. She scored five podiums and finished fifth in the drivers' standings.

=== FIA Formula 3 ===
Pin was selected to take part in a one-day FIA Formula 3 test at Magny-Cours in November 2021, alongside fellow Iron Dames racer Maya Weug and W Series drivers Nerea Martí and Irina Sidorkova.

== Single-seater career ==
=== Formula 4 ===
==== South East Asia ====
Pin made her single-seater debut in 2023, competing in the final two rounds of the Formula 4 South East Asia Championship with Prema alongside rookies Kean Nakamura-Berta and Tomass Štolcermanis. She took three podiums and a victory in Sepang, finishing second in the championship.

==== United Arab Emirates ====
In 2024, Pin raced for four rounds in the Formula 4 UAE Championship with Prema, finishing tenth in the championship, as well as securing one pole position and a victory.

==== F1 Academy ====
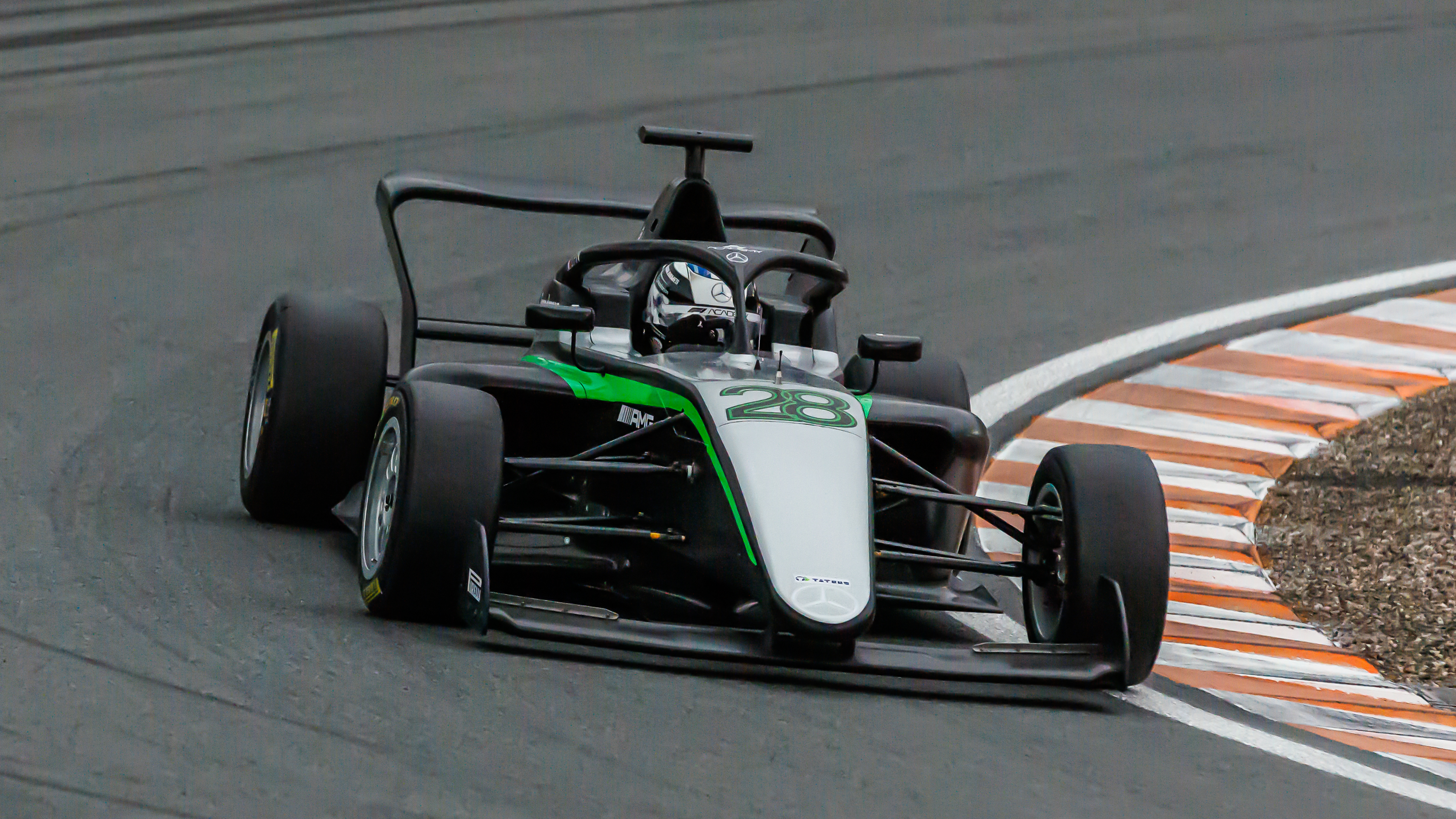
Pin competing in the 2024 F1 Academy Zandvoort round

Pin entered the 2024 F1 Academy season with Prema Racing, representing Mercedes under the series' Formula One constructor affiliation system. At the first round in Jeddah, she took pole position for both races and led every single lap to claim victory in Races 1 and 2, only missing out on the fastest lap in Race 1 for a grand slam weekend. Pin was later demoted to ninth in Race 2, having passed the chequered flag twice at racing speed due to a combination of team and driver errors. Further victories in Zandvoort and Lusail saw her finish the season as runner-up, 121 points behind champion Abbi Pulling.

Pin was retained by Mercedes and Prema for the 2025 season. She scored her first race victory of the season during Race 2 in Shanghai. She won again in Miami, as well as Race 1 in Montreal, leaving the latter weekend with the championship lead after engine difficulties plagued championship rival Maya Weug. After finishing fifth in the season finale at Las Vegas, she claimed the championship title. With her victory, she became the third winner in history of the F1 Academy championship, as well as the series' first French winner.

Following her graduation in 2026, Pin became the mentor of her Prema and Mercedes successor Payton Westcott.

=== Formula Regional ===
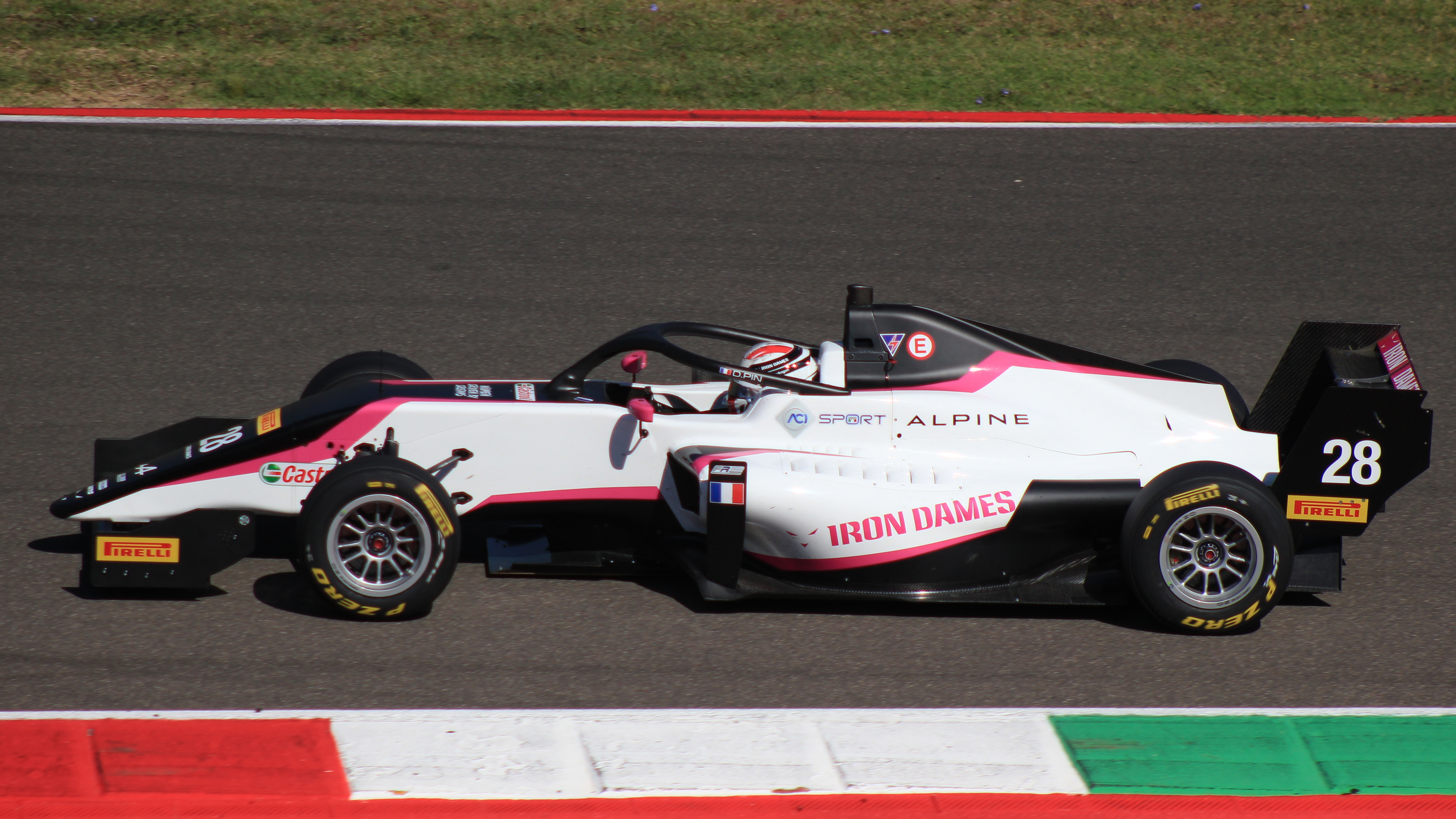
Pin in 2024 at Mugello with Iron Dames

Pin competed for Iron Dames in the 2024 Formula Regional European Championship as part of the series' first all-female lineup alongside Marta García. During the second round at Spa-Francorchamps, she was withdrawn from the second race due to a "flu-like condition" and ultimately missed the third round at Zandvoort due to fractured ribs sustained in a cycling accident. She finished the season with a highest finish of 14th, placing 27th in the overall standings.

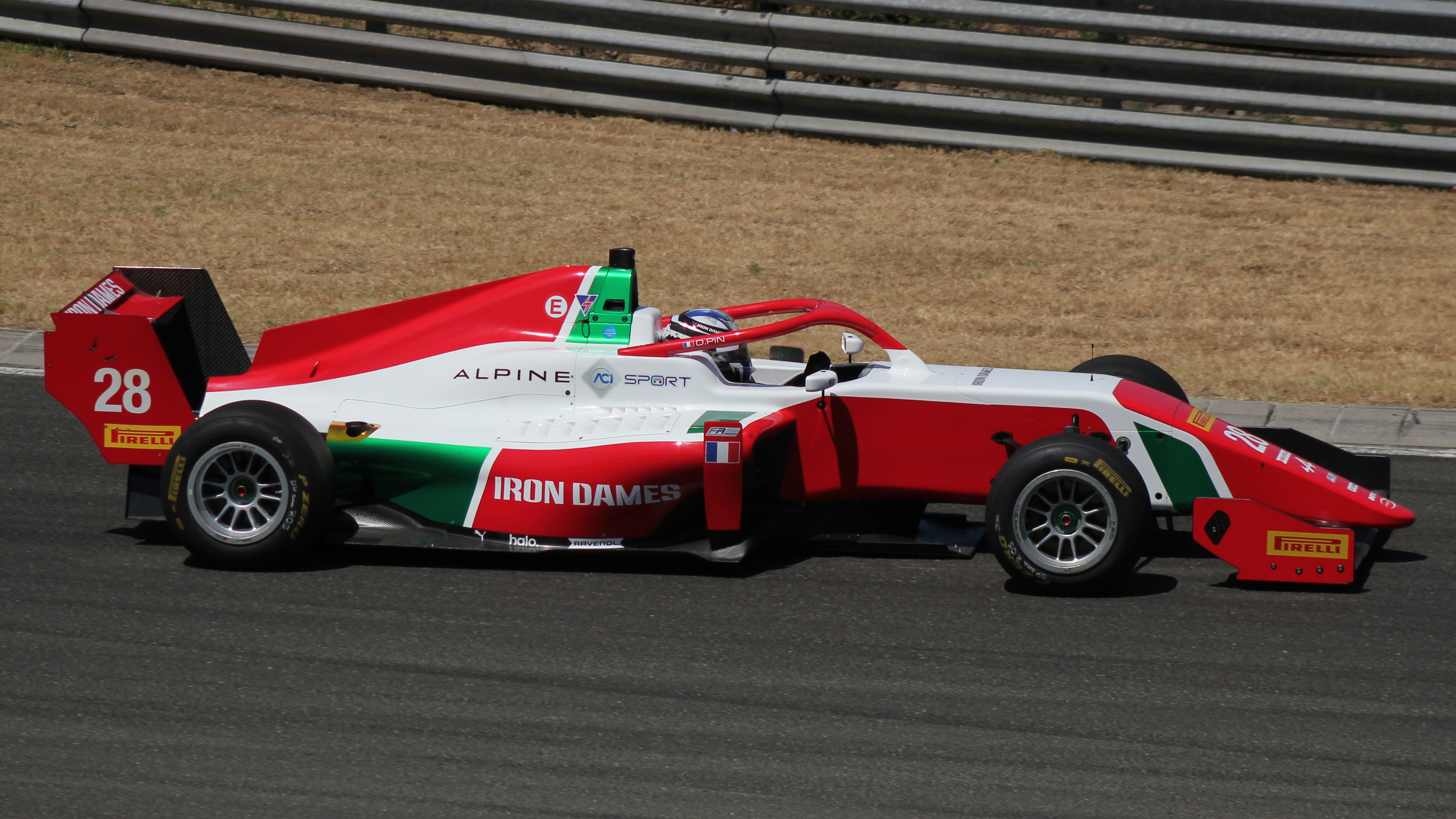
Pin driving at the Hungaroring during the 2025 Formula Regional European Championship

Pin returned to the Formula Regional European Championship in 2025 with Prema Racing, alongside a partial campaign in the Formula Regional Middle East Championship with Prema-affiliated Mumbai Falcons. In the Middle East, she finished 29th overall with her best finish being 16th place. In September, Pin announced she would withdraw from FRECA to focus on her F1 Academy title chase.

== Sports car racing career ==
=== Ferrari Challenge Europe ===
In 2021, Pin made her debut in the Ferrari Challenge Europe in the Pro category, finishing sixth in the season finale at Mugello.

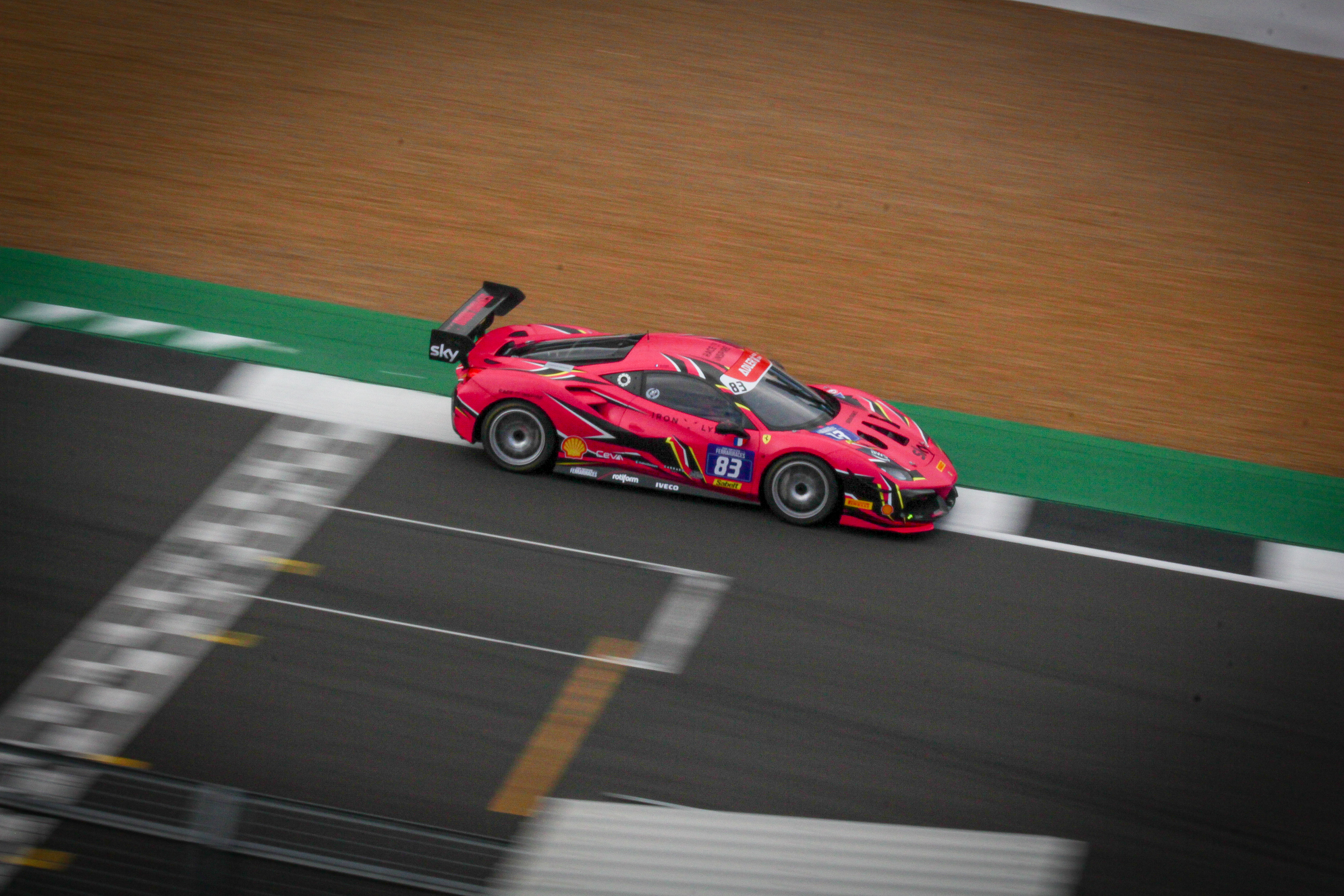
Doriane Pin racing an Iron Dames Ferrari 488 GTE in the 2022 Ferrari Challenge Europe

The following year, Pin remained with Scuderia Niki Hasler - Iron Lynx for a full season of the Ferrari Challenge. Pin dominated, winning nine out of 14 races, scoring ten pole positions and eleven fastest laps respectively and clinching the title with one round remaining. She later stated that she had "really [grown] during this year", explaining that the season taught her how to better relay feedback to her team.

=== European Le Mans Series ===
After the third round of the 2022 European Le Mans Series campaign, Pin replaced Rahel Frey in the all-female Iron Lynx lineup for the remainder of the season. Despite an early retirement at Barcelona, the squad were able to finish second in the following race at Spa-Francorchamps, where Pin set the fastest lap of the race in the GTE category. The season finale held at the Algarve International Circuit brought even more success for Pin and her teammates, with a pole position being followed up by the team's first victory in the series' history.

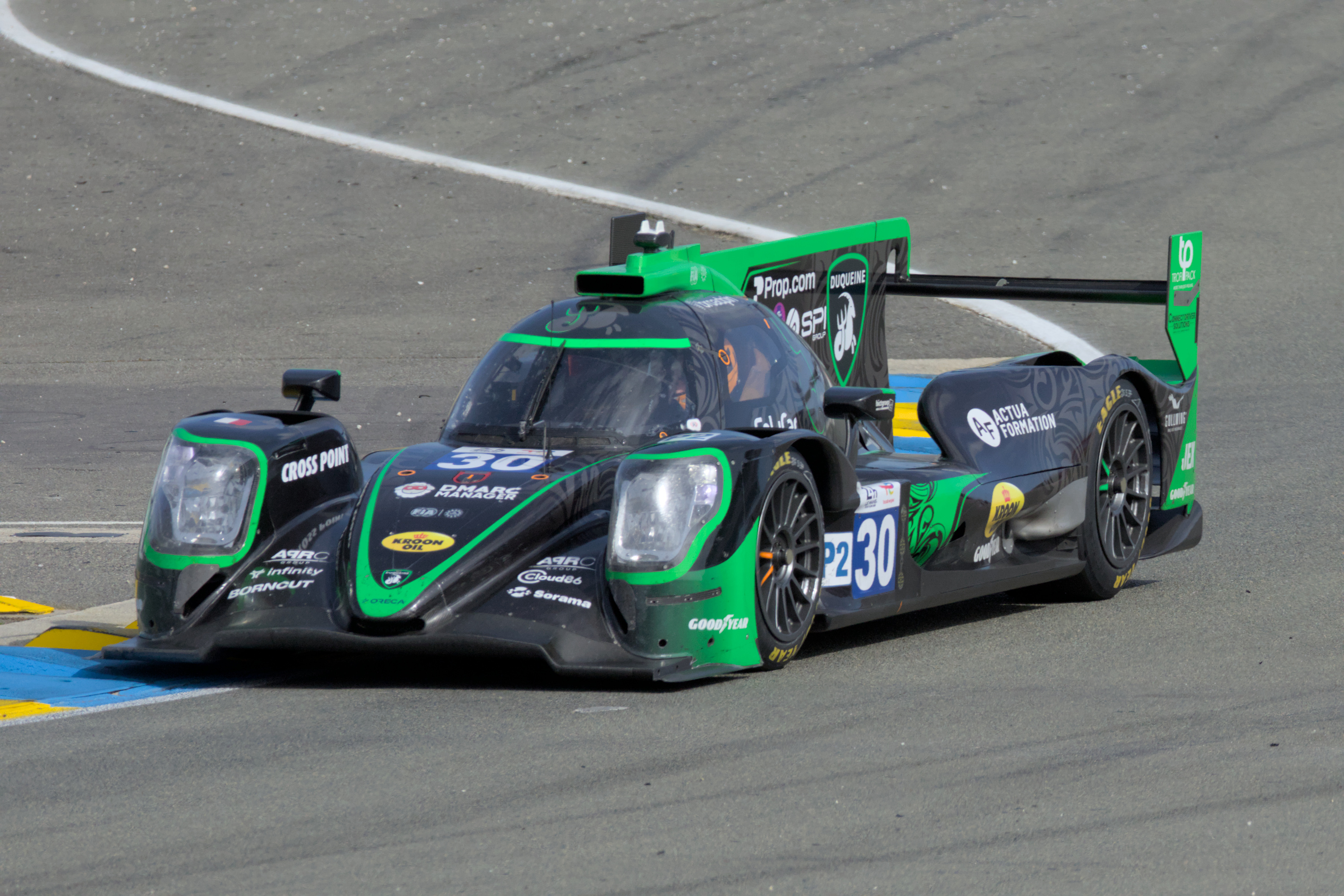
Pin driving for Duqueine at the 2026 24 Hours of Le Mans

In February 2026, it was announced that Pin will join Duqueine Team and compete in the 2026 European Le Mans Series in the LMP2 Pro-Am class. At the season opener in Barcelona, teammate Giorgio Roda qualified the car on pole position in class. Pin then led for the majority of her stint before being overtaken by Algarve Pro's Malthe Jakobsen, and Richard Verschoor brought the car home in second, with a ten-second penalty relegating him to third.

=== FIA World Endurance Championship ===
==== 2023: LMP2 debut ====
As a prize for her 2022 season, Pin was invited to take part in the FIA World Endurance Championship rookie test to be held in Bahrain on the day after the last race of the season, where she drove the LMP2 title-winning Jota car.

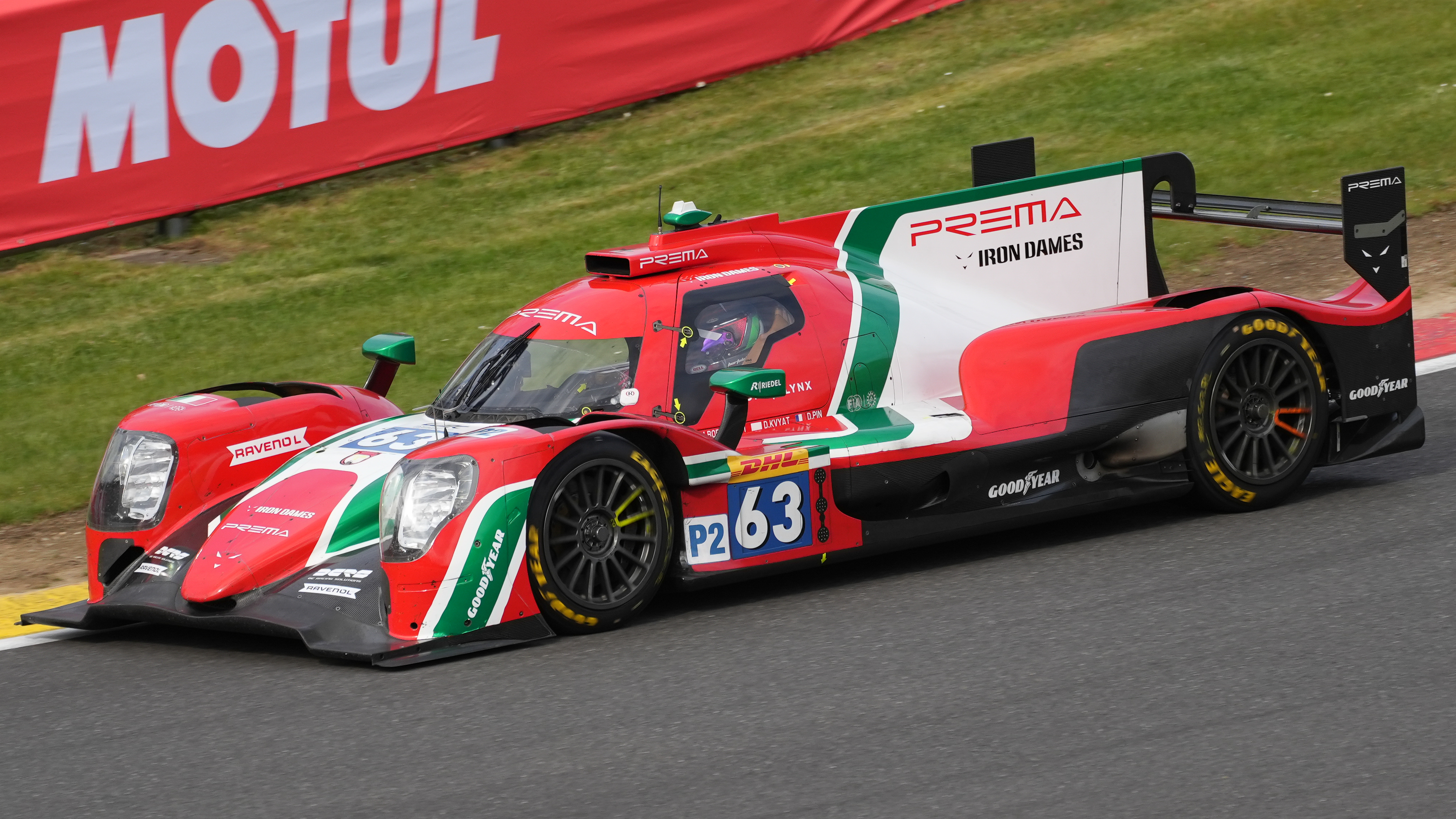
Pin driving at the 2023 6 Hours of Spa-Francorchamps

Pin made her prototype debut in 2023, partnering Mirko Bortolotti and Daniil Kvyat as the silver-ranked driver of Prema Racing in the WEC. Having been praised by Bortolotti after the series prologue, the official pre-season test, Pin took her first podium of her LMP2 tenure, finishing third after Bortolotti had pitted for fuel from the lead with mere minutes to go. The following event at Portimão saw Pin starting from pole position owing to a strong qualifying performance by Bortolotti, though she lost the lead to Sean Gelael at the start. Following a double stint, Pin relinquished the car to Kvyat who, along with Bortolotti, ended up taking fourth. During the opening portion of the 6 Hours of Spa-Francorchamps, Pin took the race lead in mixed weather conditions before dropping to second after an overtake from Tom Blomqvist. She lost second to the No. 31 WRT car in the pit stop phase, but soon took back the position and held it until the end of her run. Despite strong drives by her two teammates, a three-minute stop-go penalty for a safety car infringement meant that the No. 63 ended up tenth by the chequered flag. At the end of the season, Pin received the FIA WEC Revelation of the Year Award, becoming the first woman to do so.

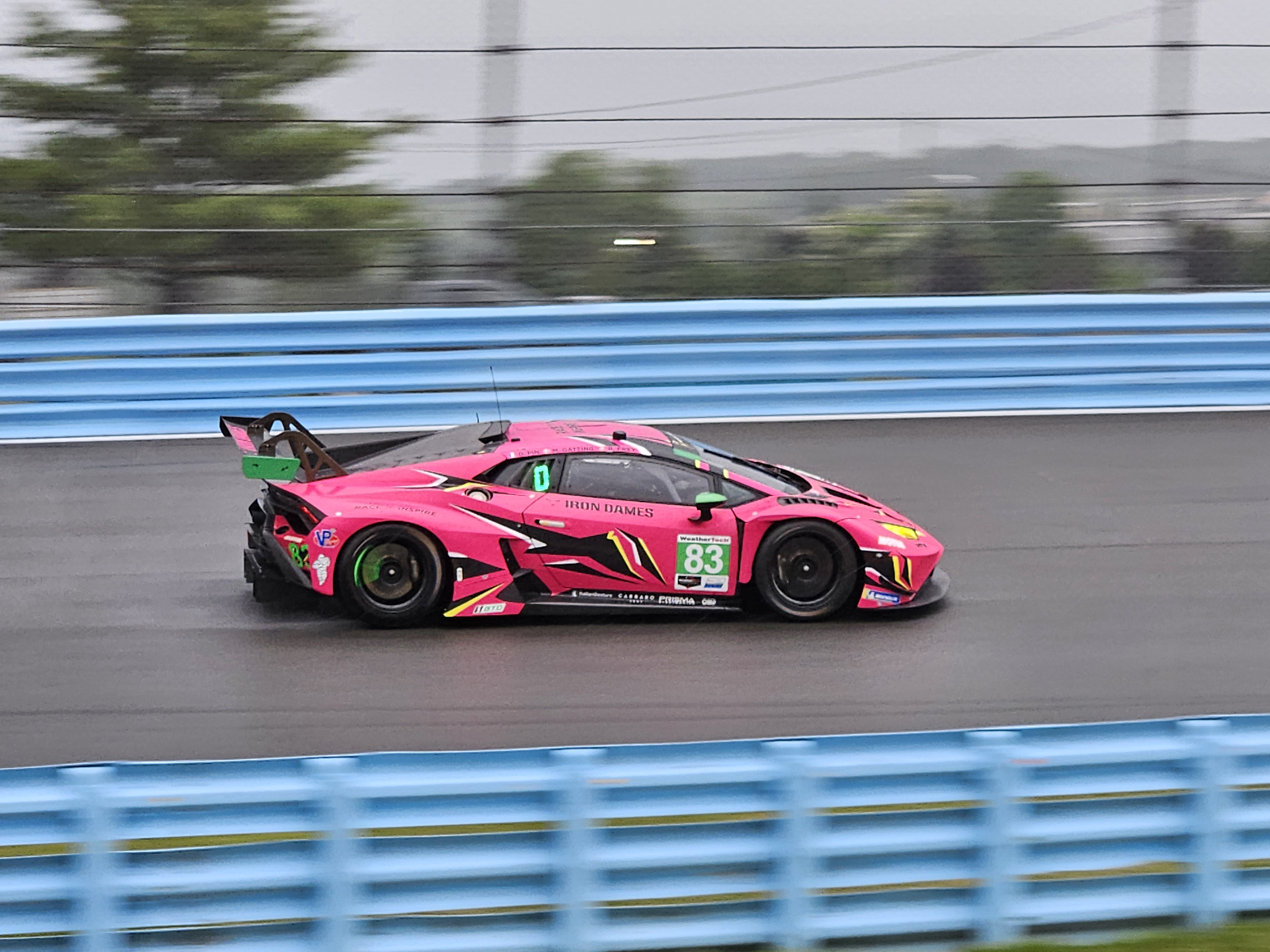
Pin driving a Lamborghini Huracán GT3 at the 2023 6 Hours of The Glen

During the same year, Pin partook in three out of four Endurance Cup races in the IMSA SportsCar Championship, racing in the GTD class for the Iron Dames. She stood out at the season-ending Petit Le Mans race, posting the best laptime averages across the GTD category, though the team finished three laps down due to mechanical troubles.

==== 2024: LMGT3 ====
With the removal of the LMP2 category from WEC and Prema discontinuing their LMP2 program entirely, Pin rejoined the Iron Dames for the 2024 FIA WEC season, teaming up with Michelle Gatting and Sarah Bovy in the new LMGT3 category. Her season was cut short after Imola by her Formula Regional European Championship campaign, and she was provisionally replaced by Rahel Frey for all rounds except Le Mans. She was eventually forced to withdraw from Le Mans as well after suffering broken ribs in a cycling accident.

==== 2026: Peugeot development driver ====
In March 2026, alongside her return to ELMS, Pin was named a development driver for Peugeot's Hypercar effort.

== Formula One ==
In 2024, Pin joined the Mercedes Junior Team. In January 2026, after winning the 2025 F1 Academy title, it was announced that Pin would serve as a development driver for Mercedes in the upcoming season. Pin became the first woman to drive a Mercedes Formula One car at Silverstone in April 2026, testing the 2021 season's W12 over 76 laps.

== Formula E ==
In May 2026, Pin was announced by Citroën Racing as its Formula E Gen4 development driver for the upcoming 2026–27 season as part of an overarching role within the Stellantis young driver programme.

== Personal life ==
Pin is in a long-term relationship with British ultramarathon runner David James.

== Karting record ==
=== Karting career summary ===
Season	Series	Team	Position
2016	Championnat de France — Minime		20th
2016	Coupe de France — Minime		14th
2016	Challenge Rotax Max France — Minime		5th
2017	Championnat de France — Junior	Rosny 93	10th
2017	Coupe de France — Junior		8th
2017	IAME International Final — X30 Junior		NC
2018	Championnat de France — Junior		5th
2018	IAME Finale Nationale — X30 Junior		12th
2019	Championnat de France — Féminin		1st
2019	FIA Motorsport Games Karting Slalom Cup	Team France	18th

== Racing record ==
=== Racing career summary ===
Season	Series	Team	Races	Wins	Poles	F/Laps	Podiums	Points	Position
2020	Renault Clio Cup France	GPA Racing	6	0	0	0	0	198	14th
2021	Le Mans Cup - GT3	Iron Lynx	7	0	0	0	5	67	5th
2021	GT World Challenge Europe Endurance Cup - Pro-Am	Iron Lynx	2	0	0	0	0	17	23rd
2021	Ferrari Challenge Europe - Trofeo Pirelli (Pro)	Scuderia Niki Hasler - Iron Lynx	2	0	0	0	0	9	9th
2022	Ferrari Challenge Europe - Trofeo Pirelli (Pro)	Scuderia Niki Hasler - Iron Lynx	14	9	10	11	13	213	**1st**
2022	Ferrari Challenge Finali Mondiali - Trofeo Pirelli (Pro)	Scuderia Niki Hasler - Iron Lynx	1	0	0	0	1	N/A	**3rd**
2022	FIA World Endurance Championship - GTE Am	Iron Dames	1	0	0	0	0	1	27th
2022	GT World Challenge Europe Endurance Cup	Iron Dames	1	0	0	0	0	0	NC
2022	Intercontinental GT Challenge	Iron Dames	1	0	0	0	0	0	NC
2022	Lamborghini Super Trofeo Europe	Iron Dames	2	0	1	0	1	0	NC†
2022	Lamborghini Super Trofeo - Grand Finals	Iron Dames	2	0	0	0	0	N/A	NC
2022	European Le Mans Series - GTE	Iron Lynx	3	1	0	1	2	44	9th
2023	IMSA SportsCar Championship - GTD	Iron Dames	3	0	0	0	0	550	42nd
2023	GT World Challenge Europe Endurance Cup	Iron Dames	1	0	0	0	0	0	NC
2023	FIA World Endurance Championship - LMP2	Prema Racing	7	0	0	0	1	63	9th
2023	Formula 4 South East Asia Championship	Prema Racing	6	1	0	1	4	82	**2nd**
2023	24 Hours of Le Mans - LMP2	Prema Racing	1	0	0	0	0	N/A	DNF
2024	Formula 4 UAE Championship	Prema Racing	12	1	1	1	1	66	10th
2024	F1 Academy	Prema Racing	14	3	5	4	8	217	**2nd**
2024	IMSA SportsCar Championship - GTD	Iron Dames	1	0	0	0	0	268	53rd
2024	FIA World Endurance Championship - GT3	Iron Dames	2	0	0	0	0	6	29th
2024	Formula Regional European Championship	Iron Dames	15	0	0	0	0	0	27th
2025	Formula Regional Middle East Championship	Mumbai Falcons Racing Limited	6	0	0	0	0	0	29th
2025	F1 Academy	Prema Racing	14	4	0	7	8	172	**1st**
2025	Formula Regional European Championship	Prema Racing	8	0	0	0	0	0	30th
2026	European Le Mans Series - LMP2 Pro-Am	Duqueine Team	6	0	0	0	2	67	4th
2026	24 Hours of Le Mans - LMP2	Duqueine Team	1	0	0	0	0	N/A	DNF
2026	Formula One	Mercedes-AMG Petronas F1 Team	Development driver						
2026	FIA World Endurance Championship - Hypercar	Peugeot TotalEnergies	Development driver						
2026–27	Formula E	Citroën Racing	Development driver						

^{†} As Pin was a guest driver, she was ineligible for points.
* Season still in progress.

=== Complete FIA Motorsport Games results ===
Year	Team	Category	Team-mate/s	Result
2019	Team France	Karting slalom	Esteban Masson	18th

=== Complete Renault Clio Cup France results ===
(key) (Races in bold indicate pole position) (Races in italics indicate fastest lap)

Year	Entrant	1	2	3	4	5	6	7	8	9	10	11	12	Rank	Points
2020	GPA Racing	NOG; 1; 10	NOG; 2; 22	MAG; 1; 10	MAG; 2; 10	LEC1; 1; 9	LEC1; 2; 13	LÉD; 1	LÉD; 2	BAR; 1	BAR; 2	LEC2; 1	LEC2; 2	14th	198

=== Complete Le Mans Cup results ===
(key) (Races in bold indicate pole position) (Races in italics indicate fastest lap)

Year	Entrant	Class	1	2	3	4	5	6	7	Rank	Points
2021	Iron Lynx	GT3	BAR; DNS	LEC; 2	MNZ; 2	LMS; 2	LMS; 3	SPA; 3	POR; Ret	5th	67

=== Complete Ferrari Challenge Europe results ===
(key) (Races in bold indicate pole position) (Races in italics indicate fastest lap)

Year	Entrant	Class	1	2	3	4	5	6	7	8	9	10	11	12	13	14	Rank	Points
2021	Scuderia Niki Hasler - Iron Lynx	Pro	MNZ; 1	MNZ; 2	RBR; 1	RBR; 2	BRN; 1	BRN; 2	VAL; 1	VAL; 2	NÜR; 1	NÜR; 2	SPA; 1	SPA; 2	MUG; 1; 6	MUG; 2; 6	9th	9
2022	Scuderia Niki Hasler - Iron Lynx	Pro	**ALG**; **1**; 1	**ALG**; **2**; 1	**LEC**; **1**; 4	LEC; 2; 3	HUN; 1; 1	**HUN**; **2**; 1	**HOC**; **1**; 1	**HOC**; **2**; 1	**SIL**; **1**; 1	**SIL**; **2**; 1	**MUG**; **1**; 3	**MUG**; **2**; 3	IMO; 1; 1	IMO; 2; 2	1st	213

=== Ferrari Challenge Finali Mondiali results ===
Year	Class	Team	Car	Circuit	Pos.
2022	Trofeo Pirelli Pro	(Italy) Scuderia Niki Hasler - Iron Lynx	Ferrari 488 Challenge Evo	(Italy) Imola Circuit	**3rd**

=== Complete FIA World Endurance Championship results ===
(key) (Races in bold indicate pole position) (Races in italics indicate fastest lap)

Year	Entrant	Class	Car	Engine	1	2	3	4	5	6	7	8	Rank	Points
2022	Iron Dames	LMGTE Am	Ferrari 488 GTE Evo	Ferrari F154CB 3.9 L Turbo V8	SEB	SPA; 10	LMS	MNZ	FUJ	BHR			27th	1
2023	Prema Racing	LMP2	Oreca 07	Gibson GK428 4.2 L V8	SEB; 3	**PRT**; 4	SPA; 10	LMS; Ret	MNZ; 7	FUJ; 10	BHR; 5		9th	63
2024	Iron Dames	LMGT3	Lamborghini Huracán GT3 Evo 2	Lamborghini DGF 5.2 L V10	QAT; 8	IMO; NC	SPA	LMS	SÃO	COA	FUJ	BHR	29th	6

=== Complete 24 Hours of Le Mans results ===
Year	Team	Co-Drivers	Car	Class	Laps	Pos.	Class Pos.
2023	(Italy) Prema Racing	(Italy) Mirko Bortolotti; Daniil Kvyat	Oreca 07-Gibson	LMP2	113	DNF	DNF
2026	(France) Duqueine Team	(Netherlands) Richard Verschoor (France) Julien Andlauer	Oreca 07-Gibson	LMP2	298	DNF	DNF

=== Complete 24 Hours of Spa results ===
Year	Team	Co-Drivers	Car	Class	Laps	Pos.	Class Pos.
2022	(Italy) Iron Dames	(Belgium) Sarah Bovy (Switzerland) Rahel Frey (Denmark) Michelle Gatting	Ferrari 488 GT3 Evo 2020	Gold Cup	531	18th	**1st**
2023	(Italy) Iron Dames	(Belgium) Sarah Bovy (Switzerland) Rahel Frey (Denmark) Michelle Gatting	Lamborghini Huracán GT3 Evo2	Bronze Cup	151	DNF	DNF

=== Complete IMSA SportsCar Championship results ===
(key) (Races in bold indicate pole position; races in italics indicate fastest lap)

Year	Entrant	Class	Make	Engine	1	2	3	4	5	6	7	8	9	10	11	Rank	Points
2023	Iron Dames	GTD	Lamborghini Huracán GT3 Evo 2	Lamborghini DGF 5.2 L V10	DAY; 18	SEB	LBH	MON	WGL; 16	MOS	LIM	ELK	VIR	IMS	PET; 12	42nd	550
2024	Iron Dames	GTD	Lamborghini Huracán GT3 Evo 2	Lamborghini DGF 5.2 L V10	DAY; 6	SEB	LBH	LGA	DET	WGL	ELK	IMS	ATL			53rd	268

=== Complete 24 Hours of Daytona results ===
Year	Team	Co-Drivers	Car	Class	Laps	Ovr. Pos.	Cla. Pos.
2023	(Italy) Iron Dames	(Belgium) Sarah Bovy (Switzerland) Rahel Frey (Denmark) Michelle Gatting	Lamborghini Huracán GT3 Evo 2	GTD	659	46th	18th
2024	(Italy) Iron Dames	(Belgium) Sarah Bovy (Switzerland) Rahel Frey (Denmark) Michelle Gatting	Lamborghini Huracán GT3 Evo 2	GTD	730	25th	6th

=== Complete Formula 4 South East Asia Championship results ===
(key) (Races in bold indicate pole position; races in italics indicate fastest lap)

Year	Entrant	1	2	3	4	5	6	7	8	9	10	11	Pos	Points
2023	Prema Racing	ZZIC1; 1	ZZIC1; 2	ZZIC1; 3	MAC; 1	MAC; 2	SEP1; 1; 10	SEP1; 2; 3	SEP1; 3; 6	SEP2; 1; 3	SEP2; 2; 2	SEP2; 3; 1	2nd	82

=== Complete Formula 4 UAE Championship results ===
(key) (Races in bold indicate pole position; races in italics indicate fastest lap)

Year	Team	1	2	3	4	5	6	7	8	9	10	11	12	13	14	15	DC	Points
2024	Prema Racing	YMC1; 1; 8	YMC1; 2; 20	YMC1; 3; 6	YMC2; 1; 5	YMC2; 2; 24	YMC2; 3; 6	DUB1; 1; 7	DUB1; 2; 13	DUB1; 3; 16	**YMC3**; **1**; 1	YMC3; 2; 10	YMC3; 3; 8	DUB2; 1	DUB2; 2	DUB2; 3	10th	66

=== Complete F1 Academy results ===
(key) (Races in bold indicate pole position; races in italics indicate fastest lap)

Year	Team	1	2	3	4	5	6	7	8	9	10	11	12	13	14	15	DC	Points
2024	Prema Racing	**JED**; **1**; 1	**JED**; **2**; 9	MIA; 1; 2	MIA; 2; 3	CAT; 1; 7	CAT; 2; 5	ZAN; 1; 5	**ZAN**; **2**; 1	SIN; 1; 3	SIN; 2; 3	**LSL**; **1**; 1	**LSL**; **2** C	YMC; 1; 3	YMC; 2; 4	YMC; 3; 5	2nd	217
2025	Prema Racing	SHA; 1; 4	SHA; 2; 1	JED; 1; 4	JED; 2; 3	MIA; 1; 1	MIA; 2 C	MTL; 1; 1	MTL; 2; 4	MTL; 3; 3	ZAN; 1; 6	ZAN; 2; 3	SIN; 1; 5	SIN; 2; 2	LVG; 1; 1	LVG; 2; 5	1st	172

=== Complete Formula Regional European Championship results ===
(key) (Races in bold indicate pole position) (Races in italics indicate fastest lap)

Year	Team	1	2	3	4	5	6	7	8	9	10	11	12	13	14	15	16	17	18	19	20	DC	Points
2024	Iron Dames	HOC; 1; 23	HOC; 2; 23	SPA; 1; 22	SPA; 2 WD	ZAN; 1	ZAN; 2	HUN; 1	HUN; 2	MUG; 1; 26	MUG; 2; 24	LEC; 1 Ret	LEC; 2; 14	IMO; 1; 25	IMO; 2 Ret	RBR; 1; 17	RBR; 2; 17	CAT; 1; 24	CAT; 2; 20	MNZ; 1; 21	MNZ; 2; 25	27th	0
2025	Prema Racing	MIS; 1	MIS; 2	SPA; 1; 19	SPA; 2 Ret	ZAN; 1; 20	ZAN; 2; 24	HUN; 1; 19	HUN; 2; 17	LEC; 1; 17	LEC; 2 Ret	IMO; 1	IMO; 2	RBR; 1	RBR; 2	CAT; 1	CAT; 2	HOC; 1	HOC; 2	MNZ; 1	MNZ; 2	30th	0

=== Complete Formula Regional Middle East Championship results ===
(key) (Races in bold indicate pole position; races in italics indicate fastest lap)

Year	Team	1	2	3	4	5	6	7	8	9	10	11	12	13	14	15	DC	Points
2025	Prema Racing	YMC1; 1	YMC1; 2	YMC1; 3	YMC2; 1	YMC2; 2	YMC2; 3	DUB; 1; 16	DUB; 2; 18	DUB; 3 Ret	YMC3; 1; 23	YMC3; 2; 20	YMC3; 3; 16	LUS; 1	LUS; 2	LUS; 3	29th	0

=== Complete European Le Mans Series results ===
(key) (Races in bold indicate pole position) (Races in italics indicate fastest lap)

Year	Entrant	Class	Car	Engine	1	2	3	4	5	6	Rank	Points
2022	Iron Lynx	LMGTE	Ferrari 488 GTE Evo	Ferrari F154CB 3.9 L Turbo V8	LEC	IMO	MNZ	BCN; Ret	SPA; 2	**ALG**; 1	9th	44
2026	Duqueine Team	LMP2 Pro-Am	Oreca 07	Gibson GK428 4.2 L V8	**CAT**; 3	LEC; 3	**IMO**; 7	**SPA**; 5	SIL; 4	ALG; 7	4th	67

Sporting positions
Preceded by Abbi Pulling	F1 Academy champion 2025	Succeeded by incumbent
