= Johns Mountain =

Mountain in the US State of Georgia

Coordinates: 34.5214747°N 85.1441166°W

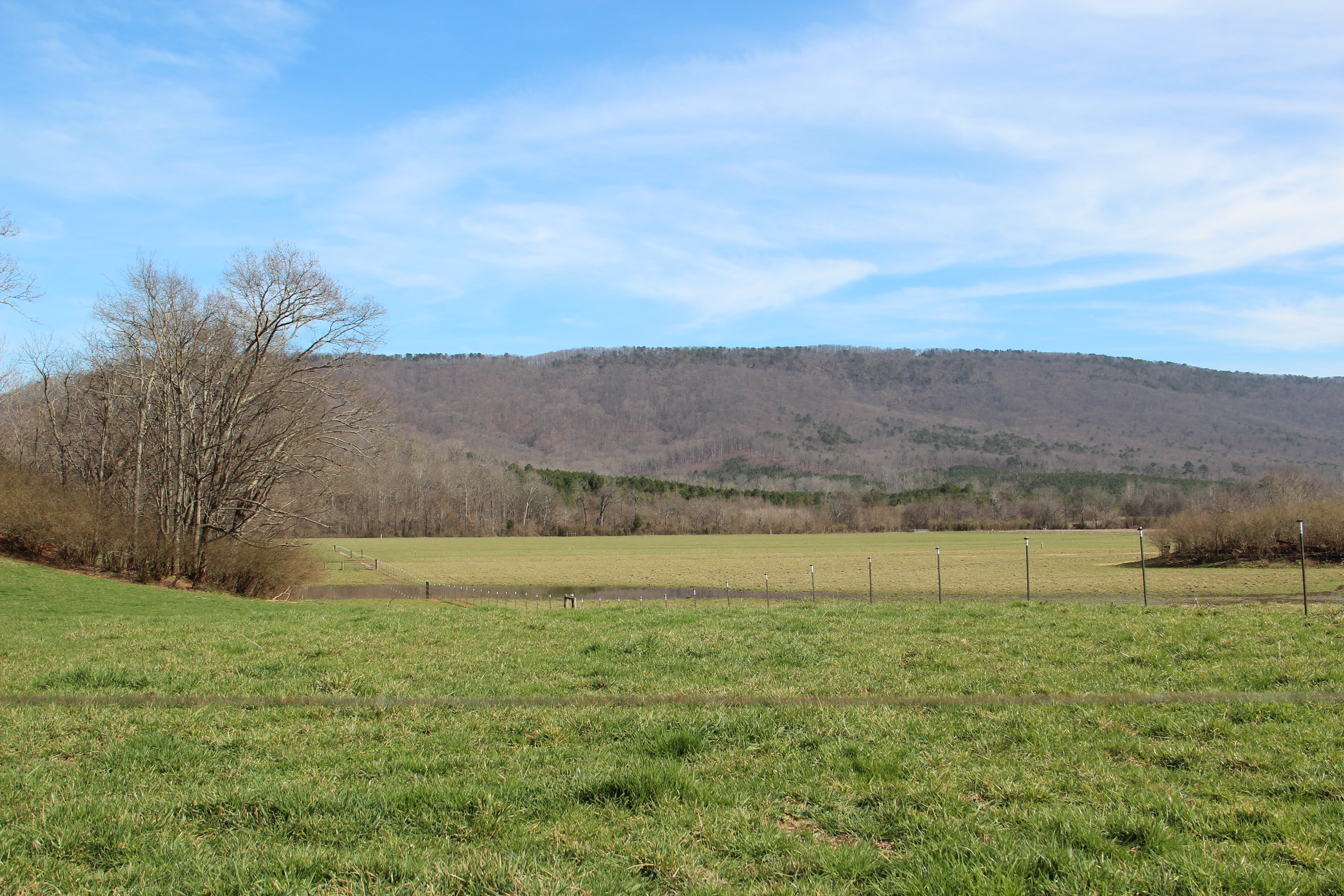
Johns Mountain, viewed from the west

Johns Mountain is a summit in the U.S. state of Georgia. With an elevation of 1,683 feet (513 m), Johns Mountain is the 666th highest summit in the state of Georgia. The mountain is located inside the Chattahoochee-Oconee National Forest.

Johns Mountain was named in honor of John Fields, a local Cherokee Indian.
