= Robert Consani =

French racing driver (born 1982)

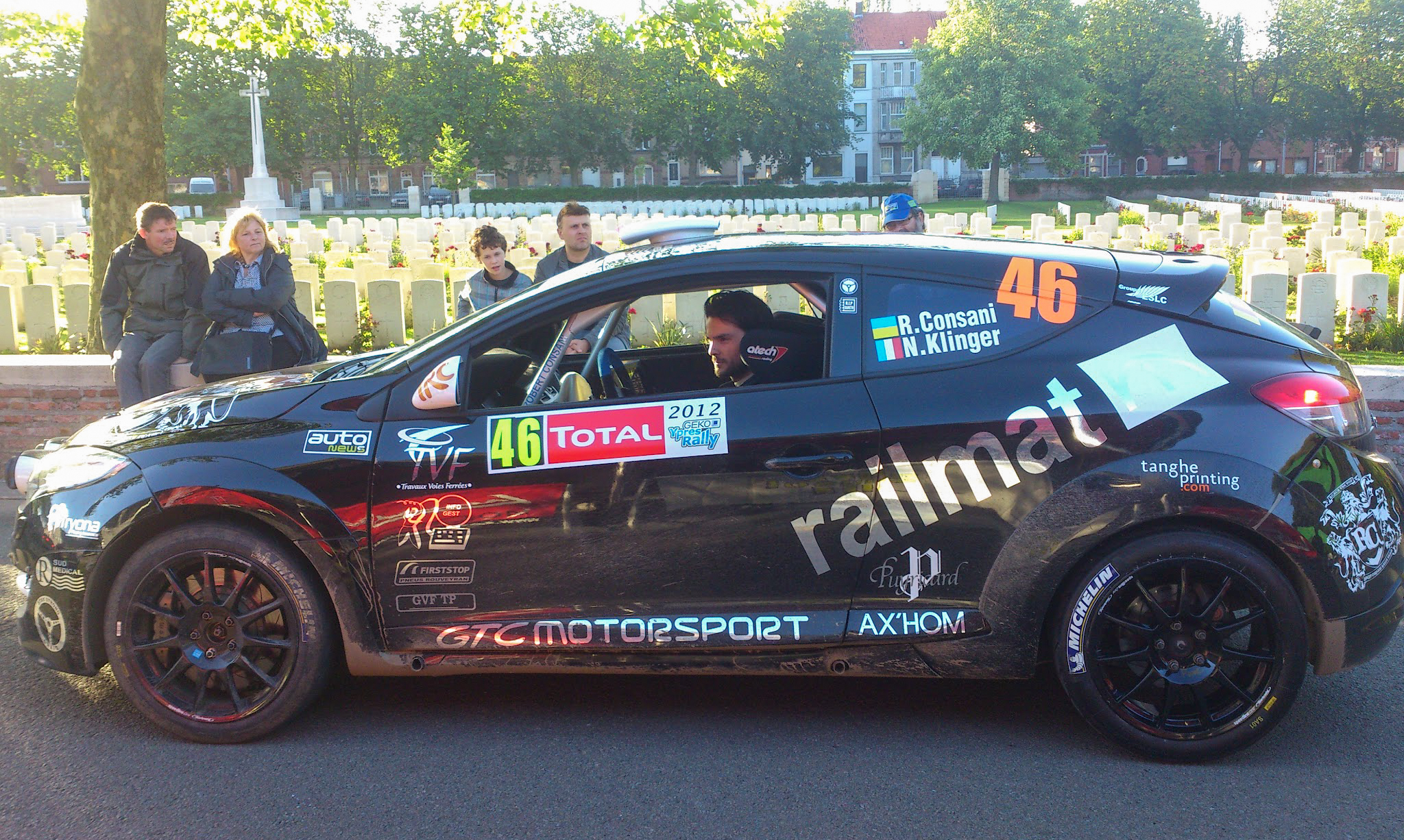
- Consani in 2012
- Nationality: (France) French
- Born: Robert Alphonse Louis Consani; 27 August 1982 (age 44) Aix-en-Provence, France
- Relatives: Georges Consani (father); Stéphane Consani (brother); Andy Consani (son)
- Categorisation: FIA Silver

Championship titles
- 2025: GT4 European Series – Silver

Robert Alphonse Louis Consani (born 27 August 1982 in Aix-en-Provence) is a French rally and racing driver who last competed for Team Speedcar in the GT4 European Series.

== Career ==
Consani made his single-seater debut in 1999, as he joined FG Team to race in the French Formula Renault Championship. After competing in the championship sporadically for four seasons, Consani took a seven-year hiatus from motorsport, returning to racing in 2010, competing in the Rallye du Var, finishing 12th overall and fifth in the R3 class.

During his rallying career, Consani was the 2012 Intercontinental Rally Challenge Production class champion and also raced in the European Rally Championship from 2013 to 2017, scoring two podiums during his tenure in the series, both achieved in 2015 on his way to fourth in points.

After returning to circuit racing in 2016, Consani joined Team Speedcar for the 2017 GT4 European Series Southern Cup season alongside Benjamin Lariche, driving a Ginetta G55. In his first season of GT4 competition Consani scored five podiums, including a Pro-Am win at Dijon, on his way to second in the standings at season's end.

Consani remained with Team Speedcar in the newly-rebranded French GT4 Cup for 2018. In his sophomore season Consani scored his first two series wins, at both Nogaro and Pau, en route to a fourth-place points finish. In 2019 Consani remained in the French GT4 Cup as Team Speedcar switched to the Alpine A110, but was only able to muster three podiums and a pole position to finish the season fifth in points. Staying with Team Speedcar in the French GT4 Cup for 2020 and returning to the Ginetta G55, Consani scored two Silver class wins and seven podiums to finish third in points as the team switched back to the Alpine A110 GT4 mid-season.

With Team Speedcar moving to the GT4 European Series for 2021 so did Consani and Lariche, who both made their debuts as the team acquired an Audi R8 LMS GT4 Evo. After finishing 12th in their maiden season, the pair returned for the 2022 season, but made their effective return at Le Castellet after being forced to withdraw from the round at Imola due to a crash in practice. In their sophomore season in the series the pair scored their maiden class podium at Misano, before following it up with their season-best result of second at the Hockenheimring en route to seventh in points.

Both Consani and Lariche were retained by Team Speedcar for 2023. The pair scored their maiden GT4 European Series win in the season-opening round at Monza, which was followed up by them finishing on the podium in all but four races as they finished runner-up in the Silver cup, missing the title by 25 points.

Returning to Team Speedcar the eighth consecutive season, Consani once again finished runner-up in points, missing out on the title by 6 after winning the last four races at Monza and Jeddah. Consani returned to Team Speedcar for 2025, scoring two wins in first two rounds at Le Castellet and Zandvoort as he took an early championship lead. Following a double podium at Spa, Consani won both races at Misano and despite not scoring a podium in the final two rounds, Consani and Lariche clinched the Silver Cup title with one round to spare.

The following year, Consani and Lariche returned to the GT4 European Series to defend their title. In the six-round season, Consani only took a pair of overall podiums at Monza and Misano to end the year eighth in points.

== Personal life ==
Consani is the son of amateur rally driver Georges Consani and is also the brother of rally driver Stéphane Consani. Consani is also married to Alexandra Consani, who was the executive director of Koiranen GP, which promoted the first two seasons of the F4 Spanish Championship. Together they have one child, Mercedes junior and fellow racing driver Andy Consani.

== Racing record ==
=== Racing career summary ===
Season	Series	Team	Races	Wins	Poles	F/Laps	Podiums	Points	Position
1999	Championnat de France Formule Renault	FG Team	2	0	0	0	0	0	NC
2000	Championnat de France Formule Renault 2000	Green Team	3	0	0	0	0	0	NC
2001	Championnat de France Formule Renault 2000	Green Team	1	0	0	0	0	0	NC
2002	Championnat de France FFSA de Formule Renault	Green Team	1	0	0	0	0	0	NC
2016	Championnat de France FFSA Supertourisme	VIP Challenge	4	0	0	0	0	75	26th
2017	GT4 European Series Southern Cup – Pro-Am	Speed Car / AT Events	2	0	0	0	1	130	**2nd**
2017	GT4 European Series Southern Cup – Pro-Am	Speedcar	10	1	1	0	4	130	**2nd**
2018	French GT4 Cup – Pro-Am	Team Speedcar	12	2	0	0	5	135	4th
2019	French GT4 Cup – Am	Arkadia Racing	2	0	0	0	0	0	NC
2019	French GT4 Cup – Pro-Am	Team Speedcar	10	0	1	1	3	84	5th
2019	GT4 South European Series – Pro-Am	Team Speedcar	2	0	0	1	1	18	7th
2019	GT4 European Series – Silver	Team Speedcar	1	0	0	0	0	0	NC
2020	French GT4 Cup – Silver	Team Speedcar	12	2	1	3	7	188	**3rd**
2021	GT4 European Series – Silver	Team Speedcar	12	0	0	0	0	55	12th
2021	French GT4 Cup – Pro-Am	Team Speedcar	2	0	0	0	0	0	NC
2022	GT4 European Series – Silver	Team Speedcar	10	0	1	1	2	95	7th
2023	GT4 European Series – Silver	Team Speedcar	12	1	3	1	8	145	**2nd**
2024	GT4 European Series – Silver	Team Speedcar	12	4	4	1	7	180	**2nd**
2025	GT4 European Series – Silver	Team Speedcar	12	4	2	0	7	181	**1st**
2026	GT4 European Series – Silver	Team Speedcar	12	0	1	0	2	79	8th

=== Complete GT4 European Series results ===
(key) (Races in bold indicate pole position) (Races in italics indicate fastest lap)

Year	Team	Car	Class	1	2	3	4	5	6	7	8	9	10	11	12	Pos	Points
2019	Team Speedcar	Alpine A110 GT4	Silver	MNZ; 1	MNZ; 2	BRH; 1	BRH; 2	LEC; 1 DNS	LEC; 2 Ret	MIS; 1	MIS; 2	ZAN; 1	ZAN; 2	NÜR; 1	NÜR; 2	NC	0
2021	Team Speedcar	Audi R8 LMS GT4 Evo	Silver	MNZ; 1; 11	MNZ; 2; 14	LEC; 1; 10	LEC; 2; 11	ZAN; 1; 15	ZAN; 2; 15	SPA; 1; 12	SPA; 2; 10	NÜR; 1; 5	NÜR; 2; 9	CAT; 1; 37†	CAT; 2; 9	12th	55
2022	Team Speedcar	Audi R8 LMS GT4 Evo	Silver	IMO; 1 WD	IMO; 2 WD	LEC; 1 Ret	LEC; 2; 4	MIS; 1; 13	MIS; 2; 22	SPA; 1; 7	SPA; 2; 8	**HOC**; **1**; 4	HOC; 2; 2	CAT; 1; 12	CAT; 2; 10	7th	95
2023	Team Speedcar	Audi R8 LMS GT4 Evo	Silver	MNZ; 1; 1	MNZ; 2 Ret	LEC; 1; 3	LEC; 2 Ret	SPA; 1; 54	SPA; 2; 2	**MIS**; **1**; 2	**MIS**; **2**; 3	HOC; 1; 42†	HOC; 2; 2	CAT; 1; 2	CAT; 2; 3	2nd	145
2024	Team Speedcar	Audi R8 LMS GT4 Evo	Silver	LEC; 1; 5	LEC; 2; 42†	MIS; 1; 2	**MIS**; **2**; 2	SPA; 1; 2	SPA; 2; 16	HOC; 1; 4	HOC; 2; 39†	**MNZ**; **1**; 1	**MNZ**; **2**; 1	JED; 1; 1	**JED**; **2**; 1	2nd	180
2025	Team Speedcar	Audi R8 LMS GT4 Evo	Silver	LEC; 1; 7	LEC; 2; 1	ZAN; 1; 2	**ZAN**; **2**; 1	SPA; 1; 2	SPA; 2; 3	MIS; 1; 1	**MIS**; **2**; 1	NÜR; 1 Ret	NÜR; 2; 8	CAT; 1; 6	CAT; 2; 6	1st	181
2026	Team Speedcar	Audi R8 LMS GT4 Evo	Silver	LEC; 1; 8	LEC; 2 Ret	**MNZ**; **1**; 37	**MNZ**; **2**; 2	SPA; 1 Ret	SPA; 2; 4	**MIS**; **1** Ret	MIS; 2; 2	ZAN; 1; 4	ZAN; 2; 4	ALG; 1; 23	ALG; 2; 22	8th	79
