= Niccolò Maccagnani =

Italian racing driver (born 2010)

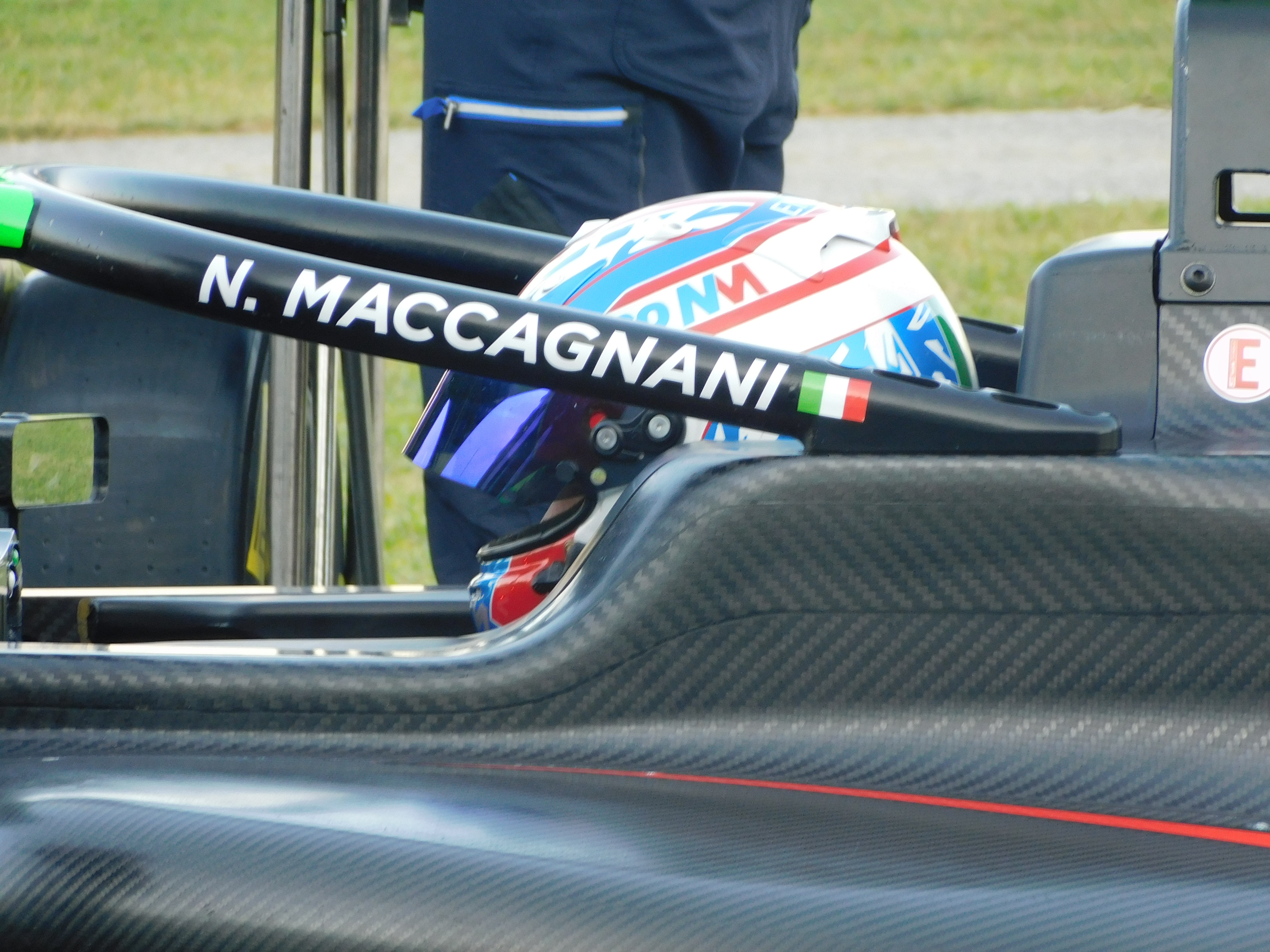
- Maccagnani in 2025
- Nationality: (Italy) Italian
- Born: 28 August 2010 (age 16) Rome, Italy

FIA Formula 3 Championship career
- Debut season: 2026
- Current team: Trident
- Car number: TBA
- Former teams: Rodin Motorsport
- Starts: 3
- Wins: 0
- Podiums: 0
- Poles: 0
- Fastest laps: 0
- Best finish: 34th in 2026

Previous series
- 2026 2026 2025–2026 2025 2025 2025: Euroformula Open; UAE4 Series; E4; Italian F4; Formula Trophy; F4 South East Asia
- Statistics up to date as of 19 October 2026.

Niccolò Maccagnani (born 28 August 2010) is an Italian racing driver who is set to compete in the FIA Formula 3 Championship with Trident as part of the Ferrari Driver Academy.

Born in Rome, Italy, Maccagnani made his single-seater debut in 2025 in the Formula 4 South East Asia Championship. He is the 2025 Formula Trophy runner-up.

== Personal life ==
Maccagnani is the son of fashion designer and entrepreneur Stefano Maccagnani, who founded Au197Sm in 2016.

== Career ==
=== Formula 4 (2024–2026) ===
==== 2024 ====
In late 2024, Maccagnani participated in the 21st edition of the Supercorso Federale.

==== 2025 ====
Maccagnani made his single-seater debut towards the end of 2025, joining Pinnacle Motorsport to compete in the final two rounds of Formula 4 South East Asia, following an extensive testing programme in Europe. After finishing on the podium in all three races on his debut round, Maccagnani won all three races in the season-ending round to jump up to fourth in the overall standings.

Following that, Maccagnani joined BVM Racing to compete in the final round of both the Italian F4 and E4 Championships, taking a best result of sixth in race three of the latter at Monza, which also served as his only rookie podium of the year. In late November, Maccagnani returned to Pinnacle Motorsport to race in the newly-rebranded Formula Trophy. In the three-round season, Maccagnani scored a pair of second-place finishes in the first Yas Marina round, en route to runner-up honours in points, 27 points behind champion Alp Aksoy.

==== 2026 ====
At the beginning of 2026, Maccagnani remained in the UAE as he switched to Prema Racing-run Mumbai Falcons Racing Limited to race in the UAE4 Series. After winning the reverse-grid race of the first Yas Marina round, Maccagnani finished second in race two at the same venue the following week, to enter the second half of the season fourth in points. In the final two rounds, Maccagnani scored two top-fives at Dubai and a win in the reverse-grid race two at Lusail to end the winter fourth in the standings.

For the rest of the year, Maccagnani joined the main Prema outfit for a dual campaign in both the Italian F4 and E4 Championships. In the season-opening round at Misano, Maccagnani won race one on track, but was later given a ten-second penalty which demoted him to fourth, before bouncing back to win race three later that weekend. At Vallelunga however, Maccagnani finished 24th in race two after a collision with Andy Consani and retired in race three following a first-lap crash, which led to him not qualifying for the final race of the weekend. Following that, Maccagnani won race one at Mugello and finished on the podium in the round's two other races prior to leaving the team with two rounds remaining. In E4, Maccagnani scored a lone podium at Vallelunga from pole to end the season 13th in points.

=== Formula Regional (2026) ===
After leaving Prema mid-season, Maccagnani joined BVM Racing to make a cameo appearance in the Monza round of the Euroformula Open Championship, where he finished third in race two.

=== FIA Formula 3 (2026–) ===
==== 2026 ====
Maccagnani made his Formula 3 debut for the final round of the 2026 championship in Madrid, driving for Rodin Motorsport in place of Christian Ho.

==== 2027 ====
Maccagnani secured a full-time drive in Formula 3 with Trident in 2027, partnering Kean Nakamura-Berta and Sebastian Wheldon.

=== Formula One ===
In August 2025, Maccagnani was announced to be joining the Ferrari Driver Academy for the 2026 season alongside Alba Larsen.

== Karting record ==
=== Karting career summary ===
Season	Series	Team	Position
2021	WSK Final Cup – 60 Mini	Maccagnani Stefano	DNQ
2022	WSK Champions Cup – Mini	Maccagnani Stefano	DNQ
2022	WSK Super Master Series – Mini	Maccagnani Stefano	125th
2022	WSK Euro Series – Mini	Maccagnani Stefano	69th

== Racing record ==
=== Career summary ===
Season	Series	Team	Races	Wins	Poles	F/Laps	Podiums	Points	Position
2025	Formula 4 South East Asia Championship	Pinnacle Motorsport	6	3	3	3	6	158	4th
2025	Formula Trophy	Pinnacle Motorsport	7	0	0	0	2	76	**2nd**
2025	Italian F4 Championship	BVM Racing	3	0	0	0	0	0	40th
2025	E4 Championship	BVM Racing	3	0	0	0	0	8	15th
2026	UAE4 Series	Mumbai Falcons Racing Limited	12	2	0	0	3	98	4th
2026	Italian F4 Championship	Prema Racing	14	2	1	0	4	178	13th
2026	E4 Championship	Prema Racing	5	0	1	0	1	57	13th
2026	FIA Formula 3 Championship	Rodin Motorsport	3	0	0	0	0	0	34th
2026	Euroformula Open Championship	BVM Racing	3	0	0	0	1	27	16th
2027	FIA Formula 3 Championship	Trident	0	0	0	0	0	0	TBD

* Season still in progress.

=== Complete Formula 4 South East Asia Championship results ===
(key) (Races in bold indicate pole position) (Races in italics indicate fastest lap)

Year	Entrant	1	2	3	4	5	6	7	8	9	10	11	12	13	14	Pos	Points
2025	Pinnacle Motorsport	SEP1; 1	SEP1; 2	SEP1; 3	BUR; 1	BUR; 2	BUR; 3	BAN; 1	BAN; 2	**SEP2**; **1**; 2	SEP2; 2; 3	SEP2; 3; 2	**SEP3**; **1**; 1	SEP3; 2; 1	**SEP3**; **3**; 1	4th	158

=== Complete Italian F4 Championship results ===
(key) (Races in bold indicate pole position; races in italics indicate fastest lap)

Year	Team	1	2	3	4	5	6	7	8	9	10	11	12	13	14	15	16	17	18	19	20	21	22	23	24	25	26	27	28	DC	Points
2025	BVM Racing	MIS1; 1	MIS1; 2	MIS1; 3	MIS1; 4	VLL; 1	VLL; 2	VLL; 3	VLL; 4	MNZ; 1	MNZ; 2	MNZ; 3	MUG; 1	MUG; 2	MUG; 3	IMO; 1	IMO; 2	IMO; 3	CAT; 1	CAT; 2	CAT; 3	MIS2; 1; 15	MIS2; 2	MIS2; 3; 25	MIS2; 4; 32	MIS2; 5				40th	0
2026	Prema Racing	MIS1; 1; 4	MIS1; 2	MIS1; 3; 1	MIS1; 4; 6	VLL; 1	VLL; 2; 24	VLL; 3 Ret	VLL; 4 DNQ	MNZ; 1; 24	MNZ; 2	MNZ; 3; 6	MNZ; 4; 12	MUG1; 1; 1	MUG1; 2; 2	MUG1; 3	**MUG1**; **4**; 3	IMO; 1; 28	IMO; 2; 8	IMO; 3	IMO; 4; 25	MIS2; 1	MIS2; 2	MIS2; 3	MIS2; 4	MUG2; 1	MUG2; 2	MUG2; 3	MUG2; 4	13th	178

=== Complete E4 Championship results ===
(key) (Races in bold indicate pole position; races in italics indicate fastest lap)

Year	Team	1	2	3	4	5	6	7	8	9	DC	Points
2025	BVM Racing	LEC; 1	LEC; 2	LEC; 3	MUG; 1	MUG; 2	MUG; 3	MNZ; 1; 12	MNZ; 2; 12	MNZ; 3; 6	15th	8
2026	Prema Racing	**VLL**; **1**; 2	VLL; 2; 9	VLL; 3 WD	LEC; 1; 10	LEC; 2; 9	LEC; 3; 14	MNZ; 1	MNZ; 2	MNZ; 3	13th	57

=== Complete Formula Trophy results ===
(key) (Races in bold indicate pole position; races in italics indicate fastest lap)

Year	Team	1	2	3	4	5	6	7	DC	Points
2025	Pinnacle Motorsport	DUB; 1; 4	DUB; 2; 7	DUB; 3; 4	YMC1; 1; 2	YMC1; 2; 2	YMC2; 1 Ret	YMC2; 2; 4	2nd	78

=== Complete UAE4 Series results ===
(key) (Races in bold indicate pole position; races in italics indicate fastest lap)

Year	Team	1	2	3	4	5	6	7	8	9	10	11	12	DC	Points
2026	Mumbai Falcons Racing Limited	YMC1; 1; 12	YMC1; 2; 1	YMC1; 3; 29	YMC2; 1; 6	YMC2; 2; 2	YMC2; 3; 26	DUB; 1; 4	DUB; 2; 34†	DUB; 3; 5	LUS; 1; 11	LUS; 2; 1	LUS; 3; 15	4th	98

=== Complete FIA Formula 3 Championship results ===
(key) (Races in bold indicate pole position) (Races in italics indicate fastest lap)

Year	Entrant	1	2	3	4	5	6	7	8	9	10	11	12	13	14	15	16	17	18	19	20	DC	Points
2026	Rodin Motorsport	MEL; SPR	MEL; FEA	MON; SPR	MON; FEA	CAT; SPR	CAT; FEA	RBR; SPR	RBR; FEA	SIL; SPR	SIL; FEA	SPA; SPR	SPA; FEA	HUN; SPR	HUN; FEA	MNZ; SPR	MNZ; FEA	MAD; SPR; 28	MAD; FEA1; 18	MAD; FEA2; 24		34th	0
2027	Trident	BHR; SPR	BHR; FEA	JED; SPR	JED; FEA	MEL; SPR	MEL; FEA	MTL; SPR	MTL; FEA	MON; SPR	MON; FEA	SIL; SPR	SIL; FEA	RBR; SPR	RBR; FEA	MNZ; SPR	MNZ; FEA	MAD; SPR	MAD; FEA	IST; SPR	IST; FEA	TBD	TBD

=== Complete Euroformula Open Championship results ===
(key) (Races in bold indicate pole position) (Races in italics indicate fastest lap)

Year	Team	1	2	3	4	5	6	7	8	9	10	11	12	13	14	15	16	17	18	19	20	21	22	23	24	DC	Points
2026	BVM Racing	PRT; 1	PRT; 2	PRT; 3	SPA; 1	SPA; 2	SPA; 3	MIS; 1	MIS; 2	MIS; 3	HUN; 1	HUN; 2	HUN; 3	LEC; 1	LEC; 2	LEC; 3	HOC; 1	HOC; 2	HOC; 3	MNZ; 1; 4	MNZ; 2; 3	MNZ; 3 Ret	CAT; 1	CAT; 2	CAT; 3	16th	27
