= Mercedes Junior Programme =

Program to support young racing drivers through their careers

(Germany) Mercedes Junior Programme
- Founded: 2014; 12 years ago
- Base: Brackley, Northamptonshire, England
- Team principal(s): Gwen Lagrue (co-Director)
- Current drivers: Formula Regional (United Arab Emirates) Rashid Al Dhaheri; Formula 4 (France) Andy Consani (United Kingdom) Kenzo Craigie (Spain) Luna Fluxá; F1 Academy (United States) Payton Westcott; Karting (Australia) James Anagnostiadis (Italy) Niccolò Perico (Germany) Devin Titz
- Website: https://www.mercedesamgf1.com/team

Antonelli and Russell at the 2026 Dutch Grand Prix

The Mercedes Junior Programme is a driver development programme by the Mercedes-AMG F1 Team to help promote drivers from karts through the feeder series ladder to promote them to their Formula One team.

George Russell was the first graduate to race for the Mercedes team, whilst Kimi Antonelli became the first Formula One World Champion of the programme in 2026. Pascal Wehrlein and Esteban Ocon both joined Formula One teams in 2016 whilst part of the Junior Programme, however neither competed for the Mercedes team.

== History ==
=== Early iteration ===
Before returning to Formula One as a works constructor, Mercedes-Benz established an acclaimed prototype junior programme in 1990 under motorsport boss Jochen Neerpasch. Mercedes selected the top three drivers from the 1989 German Formula 3 Championship - Michael Schumacher, Heinz-Harald Frentzen, and Karl Wendlinger and paired them in rotation alongside veteran mentor Jochen Mass in the Sauber-Mercedes C11 to compete in the World Sportscar Championship. Wendlinger and Mass won at Spa-Francorchamps in 1990, while Schumacher and Mass took victory at the season finale in Mexico. In 1991, Schumacher and Wendlinger competed full-time in the C291, winning the season finale at Autopolis.

The initiative achieved a 100% graduation rate to Formula One. Schumacher and Wendlinger debuted in F1 in 1991, while Frentzen debuted with Sauber in 1994.

=== Return in the modern era ===
Following Mercedes' return as a works F1 team in 2010 and the rise of Toto Wolff as Head of Motorsport, the modern programme began taking shape in 2014 when Gwen Lagrue was hired as Driver Development Advisor to oversee scouting and management. The programme's initial intake centered on 2015 DTM Champion Pascal Wehrlein and 2015 GP2 Champion and Esteban Ocon. Both graduated to F1 in 2016 with Mercedes power-unit customer Manor Racing. Wehrlein moved to Sauber in 2017 before leaving F1 and the programme in 2018 for Formula E, while Ocon raced for numerous teams including winning the 2021 Hungarian Grand Prix. Ocon tested for Mercedes, but never made it to a full time race seat.

Signed in early 2017, George Russell won back-to-back titles in GP3 and FIA Formula 2, before joining Mercedes customer engine team Williams Racing from 2019 to 2021. Russell made a one-off appearance for the works team at the 2020 Sakhir Grand Prix replacing Lewis Hamilton before becoming the first academy graduate promoted to a full-time Mercedes F1 race seat in 2022. Whilst Russell would continue driving alongside teammate Lewis Hamilton, the programme was developing Italian driver Kimi Antonelli who had been signed in 2018. Antonelli won titles in both European F4 and Formula Regional before skipping Formula 3 joining F2 in 2024. In 2025, Antonelli replaced the departing Lewis Hamilton at Mercedes, forming the team's first all-academy F1 line-up alongside Russell. In 2026, Antonelli became the programme's first Formula One World Champion.

In 2024, Mercedes became an active backer of the new F1 Academy series signing French endurance racer Doriane Pin, who would win the series title in 2025. In 2026, the team signed American Payton Westcott.

Other notable alumni of the programme include Frederik Vesti, who was the Formula One teams reserve driver between 2024 and 2026 and Estonian Paul Aron became Alpine F1 Team reserve driver in 2025.

== Current drivers ==
Junior Programme driver Payton Westcott in 2026

Driver	Years	Current Series	Titles achieved as Mercedes Junior Programme member
(Spain) Luna Fluxá	2022–	F4 Spanish Championship	none
(United Kingdom) Kenzo Craigie	2023–	UAE4 Series; Italian F4 Championship; E4 Championship	none
(Australia) James Anagnostiadis	2024–	Karting (OK); Italian F4 Championship; F4 British Championship	none
(United Arab Emirates) Rashid Al Dhaheri	2025–	Formula Regional Middle East Trophy; Formula Regional European Championship	none
(France) Andy Consani	2025–	UAE4 Series; Italian F4 Championship; E4 Championship	none
(Italy) Niccolò Perico	2026–	Karting (OK-NJ)	none
(Germany) Devin Titz	2026–	Karting	none
(United States) Payton Westcott	2026–	F1 Academy; Italian F4 Championship	none

== Graduates to Formula One ==
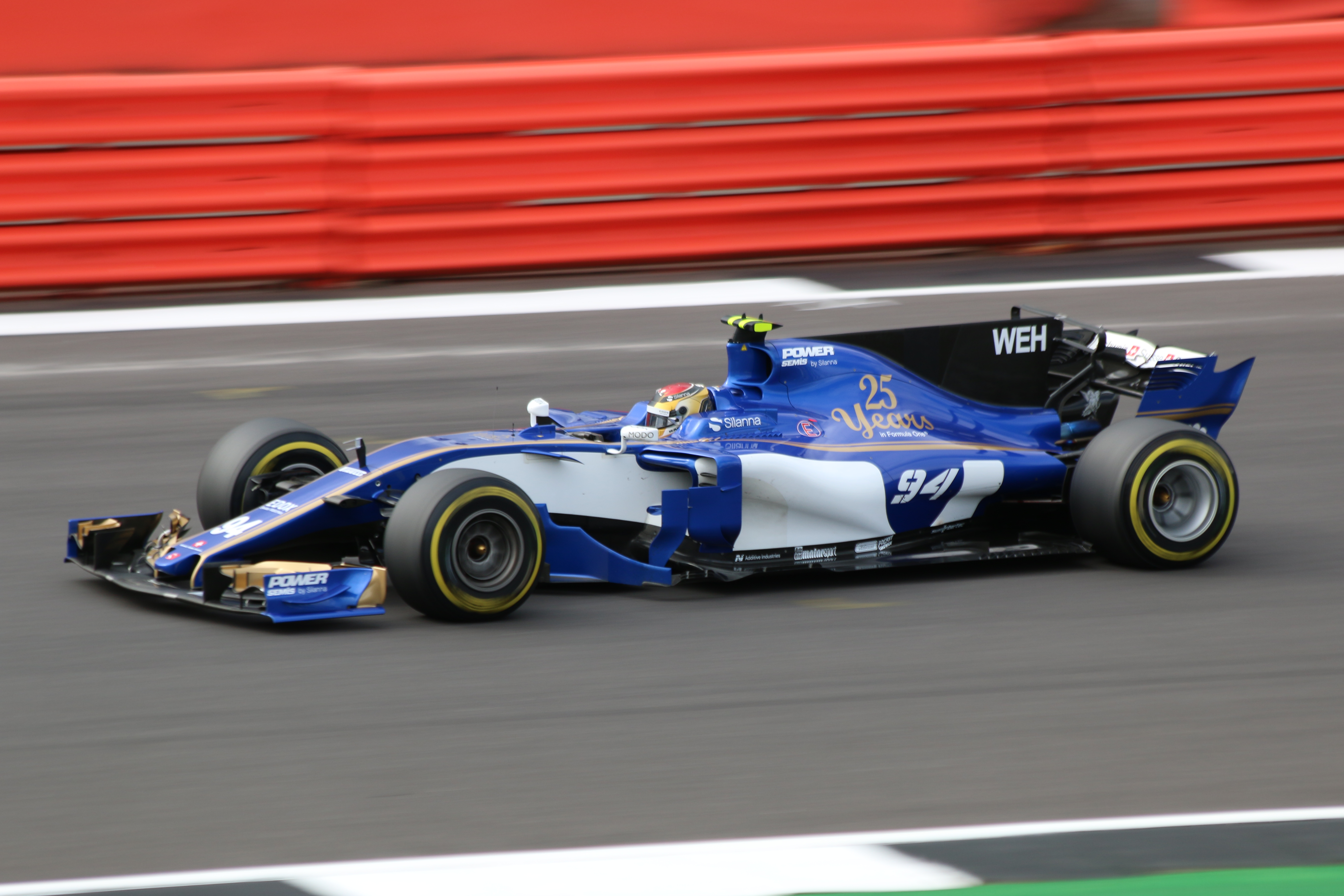
Programme graduate Pascal Wehrlein driving for Sauber

This list contains the drivers that have graduated to Formula One with support from Mercedes. Therefore, drivers who have had support in the past and entered Formula 1 through other means are not included. Drivers who drove for other teams while still part of Mercedes' youth setup are highlighted in italics.

Driver	Academy experience		F1 experience with Mercedes	F1 experience with other teams
Driver	Years	Former series	F1 experience with Mercedes	F1 experience with other teams
(Germany) Pascal Wehrlein	2014–2018	Deutsche Tourenwagen Masters (2014–2015, 2018); Formula One (2016–2017)	—N/a	Manor (2016); Sauber (2017)
(France) Esteban Ocon	2015–2019	GP3 Series (2015); Deutsche Tourenwagen Masters (2016); Formula One (2016–2018)	—N/a	Manor (2016); Force India (2017–2018); Renault (2020); Alpine (2021–2024); Haas (2025–2026)
(United Kingdom) George Russell	2017–2021	GP3 Series (2017); FIA Formula 2 Championship (2018); Formula One (2019–2021)	2020, 2022–	Williams (2019–2021)
(Italy) Kimi Antonelli	2018–2024	Italian F4 Championship (2021–2022); ADAC Formula 4 Championship (2022); Formula Regional Middle East Championship (2023); Formula Regional European Championship (2023); FIA Formula 2 Championship (2024)	2025–	—N/a

== Former drivers ==
Driver	Years	Series that driver competed as Mercedes Junior
(Estonia) Paul Aron	2019–2023	Italian F4 Championship (2019); ADAC F4 Championship (2019); Formula Renault Eurocup (2020); Formula Regional European Championship (2021–2022); Formula Regional Asian Championship (2022); FIA Formula 3 Championship (2023)
(Jamaica) Alex Powell	2019–2025	Karting (2019–2023); Italian F4 Championship (2023–2025); F4 Middle East Championship (2024–2025); E4 Championship (2024–2025); Formula Regional European Championship (2025)
(Denmark) Frederik Vesti	2021–2024	FIA Formula 3 Championship (2021); FIA Formula 2 Championship (2022–2023); European Le Mans Series – LMP2 (2024)
(China) Yuanpu Cui	2021–2025	Karting (2021–2023); Euro 4 Championship (2023); Formula 4 UAE Championship (2024); F4 British Championship (2024); F4 Chinese Championship (2024); Formula Regional Middle East Championship (2025); GB3 Championship (2025); Formula Regional European Championship (2025)
(United Kingdom) Daniel Guinchard	2022	F4 British Championship (2022)
(France) Doriane Pin	2024–2025	Formula 4 UAE Championship (2024); F1 Academy (2024–2025); Formula Regional European Championship (2024–2025); Formula Regional Middle East Championship (2025)
(France) Julia Montlaur	2025	Karting (2025)
(Denmark) Noah Strømsted	2025	FIA Formula 3 Championship (2025)
(United Kingdom) Ethan Jeff-Hall	2025–2026	F4 British Championship (2025–2026)
(France) Many Nuvolini	2025–2026	Karting (2025–2026)
