= George Russell =

George Russell may refer to:

== Entertainment ==
- George Horne Russell (1861–1933), Canadian painter
- George William Russell (1867–1935), pseudonym "Æ", Irish critic, poet and painter
- George Russell (composer) (1923–2009), American jazz composer and theorist

== Politics ==
- Lord George Russell (1790–1846), British general and diplomat
- Sir George Russell, 4th Baronet (1828–1898), British politician and barrister
- George Russell, 10th Duke of Bedford (1852–1893), British peer, politician and barrister
- George W. E. Russell (1853–1919), British Liberal Party politician
- George Russell (New Zealand politician) (1854–1937), New Zealand politician
- George Washington Russell (1879–1961), member of the Mississippi House of Representatives
- Ted Russell (Irish politician) (George Edward Russell, 1912–2004), Irish politician and company director

== Sports ==
- George Russell (footballer, born 1869) (1869–1930), Scottish footballer
- George Russell (footballer, born 1893) (1893–?), English outside right
- George Russell (footballer, born 1902), English full back
- George Russell (racing driver) (born 1998), British racing driver

== Other ==
- George Alfred Russell (1839–1926), Australian businessman in mining and insurance
- George Russell (horticulturist) (1857–1951), British horticulturalist, developed Russell Hybrid Lupins
- George Oscar Russell (1890–1962), American speech scientist
- George Vernon Russell (1905–1989), American architect
- George A. Russell (1921–2016), American academic administrator, president of the University of Missouri system
- George E. Russell (1933–2016), Canadian painter and art teacher
- George Russell (serial killer) (born 1958), American thief and serial killer
- George L. Russell III (born 1965), United States District Judge for the District of Maryland
