= Andy Consani =

French racing driver (born 2010)

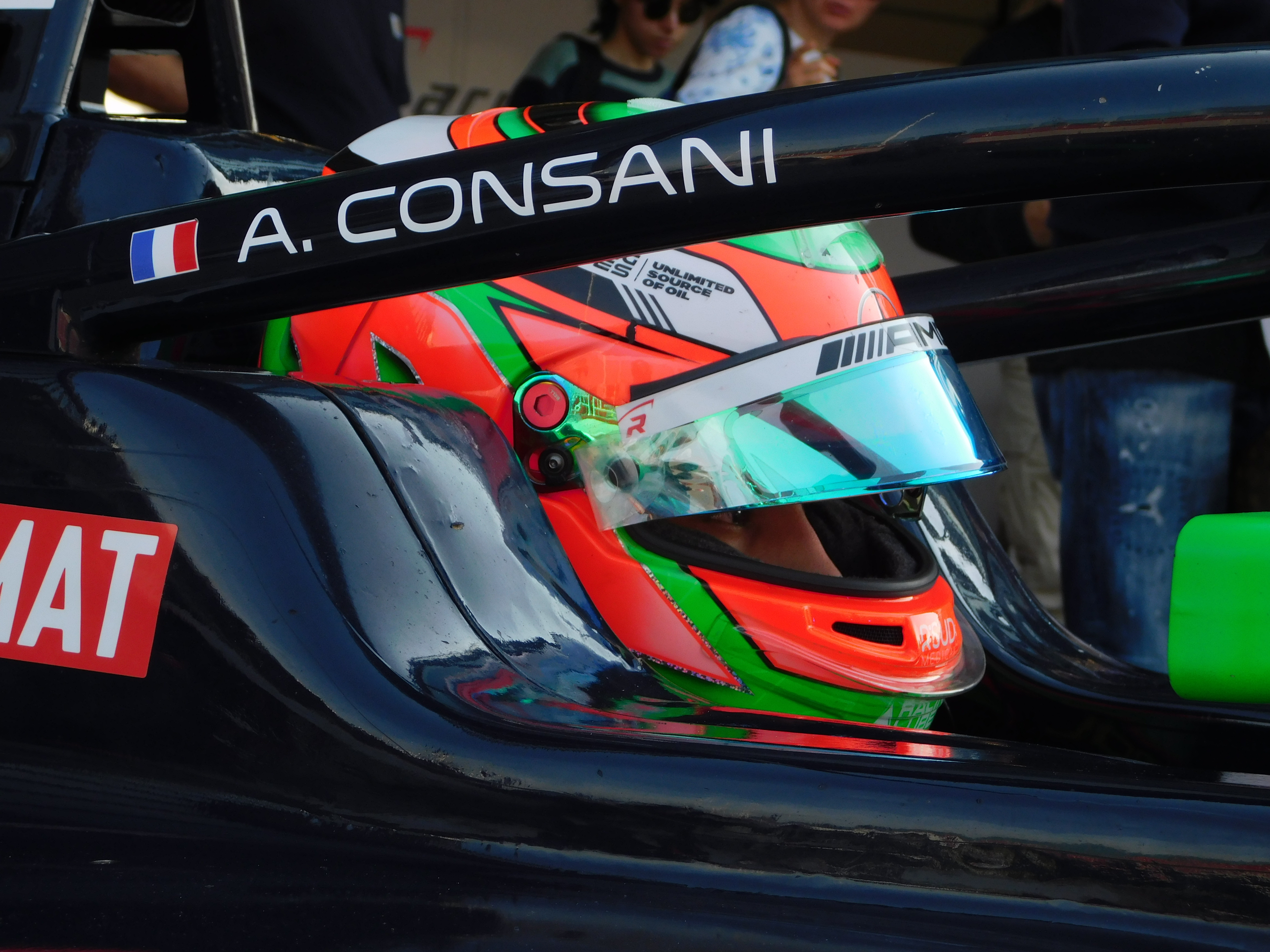
- Consani in 2025
- Nationality: (France) French
- Born: Andy Charles Victor Consani; 7 February 2010 (age 16) Aix-en-Provence, France
- Relatives: Robert Consani (father)

Italian F4 Championship career
- Debut season: 2025
- Current team: R-ace GP
- Car number: 30
- Starts: 24
- Wins: 1
- Podiums: 2
- Poles: 0
- Fastest laps: 3
- Best finish: 12th in 2026

Previous series
- 2026 2025 2025: UAE4 Series; E4; French F4
- Statistics up to date as of 2 November 2026.

Andy Charles Victor Consani (born 7 February 2010) is a French racing driver who last competed in the Italian F4 Championship for R-ace GP as part of the Mercedes Junior Programme.

Consani is the 2026 UAE4 Series runner-up.

== Career ==
=== Karting ===
Consani began karting in 2018, competing until 2024. Racing mini karts in his youth, Consani made his international debut in 2021 for Team Driver Racing Kart, most notably finishing ninth in the Andrea Margutti Trophy in the 60 Mini category. Following that, Consani spent two years in junior karts for SodiKart and Shamick Europe respectively, headlined by a ninth-place finish in the 2023 edition of the Karting World Championship. In 2024, Consani primarily raced with SodiKart for his step-up to OK Senior, in which he most notably finished fourth in the WSK Euro Series standings. Towards the end of 2024, Consani participated in the Ginetta Junior Scholarship, as well as the R-ace GP shootout, which he won, and the Richard Mille Young Talent Academy, which he lost out on despite being the fastest driver on average.

=== Formula 4 (2025–present) ===
==== 2025 ====
Consani made his single-seater debut in 2025, racing in the FFSA Academy centrally-run French F4 Championship. After finishing third on debut in the rain at Nogaro from pole, Consani only scored points once across the next two rounds, before finishing in the top-ten in all three races at Magny-Cours. Following this, Consani left the series and joined R-ace GP to compete in the final two rounds of the E4 and Italian F4 Championships. Between the two part-time campaigns, Consani found more success in E4, scoring points at both Mugello and Monza to end the year 18th in points.

==== 2026 ====
The following year, Consani remained with R-ace GP to race in the UAE4 Series. In the season-opening Yas Marina round, Consani finished second in race one, before scoring his maiden career win in race three from pole position. Consani followed that up with a pair of second-place finishes at the same venue the week after, three podiums at Dubai, and two wins from pole at Lusail to secure runner-up honours in the standings. For the rest of 2026, Consani remained with the team to race in the Italian F4 Championship. After taking a best result of fifth at Misano, Consani then took his maiden podium at Vallelunga by finishing second in race two, but was later demoted to 21st for a collision with Niccolò Maccagnani earlier in the race, forcing him on the sidelines for the final race of the weekend. After a DNQ at Monza, Consani won at the first Mugello round, before ending the year with an additional podium at the same venue to take 12th in overall points. Consani also raced with the team in the E4 Championship, where he scored two podiums at Le Castellet and finished third in overall points.

=== Formula One ===
In 2025, Consani joined the Mercedes Junior Programme.

== Personal life ==
Consani is the son of fellow rally and racing driver Robert Consani, who is the 2025 GT4 European Series champion, and Alexandra Consani, who worked as the executive director at Koiranen GP. Consani's uncle Stéphane, as well as his grandfather Georges, are former rally drivers.

== Karting record ==
=== Karting career summary ===
Season	Series	Team	Position
2018	Championnat de France — Minime	Castellet Kart	28th
2019	IAME Series France — Minime		13th
2019	Coupe de France — Minime	Castellet Kart Racing	8th
2019	National Series Karting — Minime		30th
2019	Championnat de France — Minime	Castellet Kart Racing	7th
2019	IAME International Final — Mini		23rd
2020	IAME Series France — Minime		19th
2020	Championnat de Ligue Rhône-Alpes — Minime		1st
2020	National Series Karting — Minime	Ludo Racing	14th
2020	WSK Open Cup — 60 Mini	Robert Consani	33rd
2021	WSK Champions Cup — 60 Mini	Team Driver Racing Kart	NC
2021	WSK Super Master Series — 60 Mini	Team Driver Racing Kart	45th
2021	WSK Euro Series — 60 Mini	Team Driver Racing Kart	33rd
2021	Andrea Margutti Trophy — 60 Mini	Team Driver Racing Kart	9th
2021	Italian Karting Championship — Mini Gr.3	Team Driver Racing Kart	28th
2021	WSK Open Cup — 60 Mini	Team Driver Racing Kart	44th
2021	Trofeo Delle Industrie — X30 Junior	Team Driver Racing Kart	18th
2022	WSK Champions Cup — OK-J	SodiKart	29th
2022	WSK Super Master Series — OK-J	SodiKart	41st
2022	Champions of the Future Winter Series — OK-J	SodiKart	13th
2022	Champions of the Future Euro Series — OK-J	SodiKart	28th
2022	Karting European Championship — OK-J	SodiKart	44th
2022	WSK Euro Series — OK-J	SodiKart	81st
2022	Karting World Championship — OK-J	SodiKart	NC
2022	WSK Open Cup — OK-J	Shamick Europe	13th
2022	WSK Final Cup — OK-J	Shamick Europe	31st
2023	WSK Super Master Series — OK-J	Shamick Europe	89th
2023	Champions of the Future Euro Series — OK-J	Shamick Europe	107th
2023	Karting European Championship — OK-J	Shamick Europe	16th
2023	WSK Euro Series — OK-J	Shamick Europe	38th
2023	Karting World Championship — OK-J	Shamick Europe	9th
2024	WSK Champions Cup — OK	SodiKart	26th
2024	WSK Super Master Series — OK	SodiKart	24th
2024	Champions of the Future Euro Series — OK	SodiKart	37th
2024	Karting European Championship — OK	SodiKart	16th
2024	WSK Euro Series — OK	SodiKart	4th
2024	Karting World Championship — OK	SodiKart	36th
2024	WSK Final Cup — OK	Birel ART Racing	21st

== Racing record ==
=== Racing career summary ===
Season	Series	Team	Races	Wins	Poles	F/Laps	Podiums	Points	Position
2025	French F4 Championship	FFSA Academy	12	0	1	0	1	30	13th
2025	Italian F4 Championship	R-ace GP	5	0	0	0	0	0	32nd
2025	E4 Championship	R-ace GP	6	0	0	0	0	3	18th
2026	UAE4 Series	R-ace GP	12	3	3	6	9	183	**2nd**
2026	Italian F4 Championship	R-ace GP	19	1	0	3	2	179	12th
2026	E4 Championship	R-ace GP	9	0	1	0	2	131	**3rd**
2026	FIA F4 World Cup	R-ace GP						—N/a	

* Season still in progress.

=== Complete French F4 Championship results ===
(key) (Races in bold indicate pole position; races in italics indicate fastest lap)

Year	1	2	3	4	5	6	7	8	9	10	11	12	13	14	15	16	17	18	DC	Points
2025	**NOG**; **1**; 3	NOG; 2; 10	NOG; 3; 18	DIJ; 1; 13	DIJ; 2; 12	DIJ; 3; 7	SPA; 1 Ret	SPA; 2; 9	SPA; 3 Ret	MAG; 1; 10	MAG; 2; 8	MAG; 3; 7	LÉD; 1	LÉD; 2	LÉD; 3	LMS; 1	LMS; 2	LMS; 3	13th	30

=== Complete Italian F4 Championship results ===
(key) (Races in bold indicate pole position; races in italics indicate fastest lap)

Year	Team	1	2	3	4	5	6	7	8	9	10	11	12	13	14	15	16	17	18	19	20	21	22	23	24	25	26	27	28	DC	Points
2025	R-ace GP	MIS1; 1	MIS1; 2	MIS1; 3	MIS1; 4	VLL; 1	VLL; 2	VLL; 3	VLL; 4	MNZ; 1	MNZ; 2	MNZ; 3	MUG; 1	MUG; 2	MUG; 3	IMO; 1	IMO; 2	IMO; 3	CAT; 1 Ret	CAT; 2; 31	CAT; 3 C	MIS2; 1	MIS2; 2; 20	MIS2; 3; 16	MIS2; 4; 28	MIS2; 5				32nd	0
2026	R-ace GP	MIS1; 1 Ret	MIS1; 2	MIS1; 3; 5	MIS1; 4; 7	VLL; 1; 21	VLL; 2; 21	VLL; 3	VLL; 4 DNQ	MNZ; 1; 27†	MNZ; 2; 22	MNZ; 3	MNZ; 4 DNQ	MUG1; 1	MUG1; 2; 22	MUG1; 3; 1	MUG1; 4; 8	IMO; 1; 5	IMO; 2	IMO; 3; 6	IMO; 4; 8	MIS2; 1	MIS2; 2; 20	MIS2; 3; 15	MIS2; 4; 18	MUG2; 1; 5	MUG2; 2	MUG2; 3; 3	MUG2; 4; 5	12th	179

* Season still in progress.

=== Complete E4 Championship results ===
(key) (Races in bold indicate pole position; races in italics indicate fastest lap)

Year	Team	1	2	3	4	5	6	7	8	9	DC	Points
2025	R-ace GP	LEC; 1	LEC; 2	LEC; 3	MUG; 1; 10	MUG; 2; 20	MUG; 3; 11	MNZ; 1; 9	MNZ; 2; 19	MNZ; 3; 28†	18th	3
2026	R-ace GP	VLL; 1; 9	VLL; 2; 26	VLL; 3; 21	LEC; 1; 2	LEC; 2; 4	LEC; 3; 2	MNZ; 1; 10	MNZ; 2; 4	**MNZ**; **3**; 4	3rd	131

=== Complete UAE4 Series results ===
(key) (Races in bold indicate pole position; races in italics indicate fastest lap)

Year	Team	1	2	3	4	5	6	7	8	9	10	11	12	DC	Points
2026	R-ace GP	YMC1; 1; 2	YMC1; 2; 7	**YMC1**; **3**; 1	YMC2; 1; 2	YMC2; 2; 35	YMC2; 3; 2	DUB; 1; 3	DUB; 2; 2	DUB; 3; 3	**LUS**; **1**; 1	LUS; 2 Ret	**LUS**; **3**; 1	2nd	183
