= 2025 Formula Trophy =

Emirati motor racing competition

The 2025 Formula Trophy was the second season of the Formula Trophy, a motor racing series for the United Arab Emirates regulated according to FIA Formula 4 regulations, and organised and promoted by the Emirates Motorsport Organization (EMSO) and Top Speed. The series was rebranded from Formula Trophy UAE to just Formula Trophy.

The season commenced on 28 November at the Dubai Autodrome and concluded on 13 December at the Yas Marina Circuit.

== Teams and drivers ==
Team	No.	Drivers	Class	Rounds
(United Arab Emirates) Xcel Motorsport	3	(Romania) David Cosma Cristofor		All
(United Arab Emirates) Xcel Motorsport	33	(South Africa) Cole Hewetson		3
(United Arab Emirates) Xcel Motorsport	42	(United Kingdom) Rowan Campbell-Pilling		All
(United Arab Emirates) Xcel Motorsport	77	(Netherlands) Felipe Reijs	R	All
(United Arab Emirates) Xcel Motorsport	83	(Kuwait) Jaber Al Sabah	R	1–2
(United Arab Emirates) X GP	4	(Sweden) Leon Hedfors	R	All
(United Arab Emirates) X GP	21	(United Kingdom) Tommy Harfield		3
(United Arab Emirates) X GP	30	(United States) Jia Zhanbin		1
(United Arab Emirates) X GP	65	(United Kingdom) Jarrett Clark	R	2
(United Kingdom) Hitech TGR	5	(Sweden) Scott Lindblom		All
(United Kingdom) Hitech TGR	6	(Netherlands) Nina Gademan	R	3
(United Kingdom) Hitech TGR	7	(United Arab Emirates) Theo Palmer		All
(India) Mumbai Falcons Racing Limited	10	(Turkey) Alp Aksoy	R	All
(India) Mumbai Falcons Racing Limited	16	(Brazil) Bernardo Bernoldi	R	All
(India) Mumbai Falcons Racing Limited	27	(Ukraine) Oleksandr Bondarev		2
(India) Mumbai Falcons Racing Limited	98	(United States) Payton Westcott		1, 3
(United Arab Emirates) Yas Heat Racing	12	(United Arab Emirates) Adam Al Azhari		All
(United Arab Emirates) Yas Heat Racing	17	(United Arab Emirates) Zakaria Doleh	R	All
(United Arab Emirates) Yas Heat Racing	26	(United Arab Emirates) Edoardo Iacobucci	R	All
(United Arab Emirates) Yas Heat Racing	55	(United Arab Emirates) Charbel Abi Gebrayel	R	All
(Australia) AGI Sport	13	(Australia) Noah Killion		All
(Australia) AGI Sport	15	(Australia) Nicolas Stati		2–3
(Republic of Ireland) Pinnacle Motorsport	19	(Italy) Niccolò Maccagnani		All
(Republic of Ireland) Pinnacle Motorsport	64	(South Africa) Jorden Moodley	R	All
(Republic of Ireland) Pinnacle Motorsport	88	(Malaysia) Putera Hani Imran	R	All
(Republic of Ireland) Pinnacle Motorsport	90	(United States) Kaylee Countryman		2–3
(Australia) Evans GP	22	(United Arab Emirates) Lucas Pasquinetti	R	2
(Australia) Evans GP	37	(Vietnam) Ben Anh Nguyễn		2
(Australia) Evans GP	40	(Netherlands) Kasper Schormans	R	3
(Australia) Evans GP	60	(Australia) Hunter Salvatore		All
(Australia) Evans GP	68	(Singapore) Rafael Vaessen		1–2
(United Arab Emirates) AKCEL GP	58	(Japan) Yuta Suzuki		All
(United Arab Emirates) AKCEL GP	99	(United Arab Emirates) Arthur De Doncker	R	All
(China) Black Blade Racing	63	(China) Chen Sicong		All

Icon	Legend
R	Rookie

== Race calendar and results ==
The schedule consists of 7 races over 3 rounds.

Round		Circuit	Date	Pole position	Fastest lap	Winning driver	Winning team	Rookie winner	Supporting
1	R1	Dubai Autodrome, Dubai	29 November	(Turkey) Alp Aksoy	(Turkey) Alp Aksoy	(United Arab Emirates) Theo Palmer	(United Kingdom) Hitech TGR	(Turkey) Alp Aksoy	Gulf ProCar Championship; Gulf Radical Cup
1	R2	Dubai Autodrome, Dubai	30 November		(United Arab Emirates) Adam Al Azhari	(United States) Payton Westcott	(India) Mumbai Falcons Racing Limited	(Turkey) Alp Aksoy	Gulf ProCar Championship; Gulf Radical Cup
1	R3	Dubai Autodrome, Dubai	30 November	(Turkey) Alp Aksoy	(Turkey) Alp Aksoy	(Turkey) Alp Aksoy	(India) Mumbai Falcons Racing Limited	(Turkey) Alp Aksoy	Gulf ProCar Championship; Gulf Radical Cup
2	R1	Yas Marina Circuit, Abu Dhabi	6 December	(Ukraine) Oleksandr Bondarev	(Ukraine) Oleksandr Bondarev	(Ukraine) Oleksandr Bondarev	(India) Mumbai Falcons Racing Limited	(Turkey) Alp Aksoy	Formula One World Championship; Formula 2 Championship; Masters Racing Legends
2	R2	Yas Marina Circuit, Abu Dhabi	7 December	(Ukraine) Oleksandr Bondarev	(Ukraine) Oleksandr Bondarev	(Ukraine) Oleksandr Bondarev	(India) Mumbai Falcons Racing Limited	(Turkey) Alp Aksoy	Formula One World Championship; Formula 2 Championship; Masters Racing Legends
3	R1	Yas Marina Circuit, Abu Dhabi	14 December	(United Kingdom) Rowan Campbell-Pilling	(Australia) Nicolas Stati	(United Kingdom) Rowan Campbell-Pilling	(United Arab Emirates) Xcel Motorsport	(Turkey) Alp Aksoy	Gulf 12 Hours
3	R2	Yas Marina Circuit, Abu Dhabi	14 December	(Turkey) Alp Aksoy	(Australia) Nicolas Stati	(Turkey) Alp Aksoy	(India) Mumbai Falcons Racing Limited	(Turkey) Alp Aksoy	Gulf 12 Hours

== Championship standings ==
Points are awarded to the top 10 classified finishers in each race.

Position	**1st**	**2nd**	**3rd**	**4th**	**5th**	**6th**	**7th**	**8th**	**9th**	**10th**
Points	25	18	15	12	10	8	6	4	2	1

=== Drivers' Championship ===
Pos	Driver	DUB			YMC1		YMC2		Pts
Pos	Driver	R1	R2	R3	R1	R2	R1	R2	Pts
1	(Turkey) Alp Aksoy	**6**	5	**1**	3	8	2	**1**	105
2	(Italy) Niccolò Maccagnani	4	7	4	2	2	Ret	4	78
3	(United Kingdom) Rowan Campbell-Pilling	2	10	3	15	5	**1**	6	77
4	(United Arab Emirates) Theo Palmer	1	6	2	Ret	10	8	8	60
5	(Romania) David Cosma Cristofor	5	3	5	4	7	9	16	55
6	(United Arab Emirates) Adam Al Azhari	7	2	12	27	3	4	14	51
7	(Australia) Hunter Salvatore	3	4	15	8	6	7	7	51
8	(Ukraine) Oleksandr Bondarev				**1**	**1**			50
9	(Sweden) Scott Lindblom	11	8	Ret	16	4	3	3	46
10	(United States) Payton Westcott	8	1	14			10	Ret	30
11	(United Kingdom) Tommy Harfield						21	2	18
12	(Japan) Yuta Suzuki	Ret	19	10	6	Ret	6	25	17
13	(Australia) Noah Killion	Ret	12	7	9	9	Ret	10	11
14	(Netherlands) Nina Gademan						5	11	10
15	(United Kingdom) Jarrett Clark				5	12			10
16	(Netherlands) Kasper Schormans						23	5	10
17	(Kuwait) Jaber Al Sabah	13	17	6	10	11			9
18	(Australia) Nicolas Stati				7	15	20	9	8
19	(China) Chen Sicong	16	15	8	18	Ret	14	18	4
20	(United Arab Emirates) Arthur De Doncker	17	9	9	12	17	15	12	4
21	(Netherlands) Felipe Reijs	9	14	13	17	13	16	Ret	2
22	(Sweden) Leon Hedfors	10	11	17	14	19	12	17	1
23	(Brazil) Bernardo Bernoldi	15	22	11	22	18	11	20	0
24	(Singapore) Rafael Vaessen	14	18	16	11	14			0
25	(Malaysia) Putera Hani Imran	12	13	20	13	23	13	15	0
26	(South Africa) Cole Hewetson						25	13	0
27	(United Arab Emirates) Charbel Abi Gebrayel	18	16	23	19	26	18	19	0
28	(Vietnam) Ben Anh Nguyễn				20	16			0
29	(United States) Kaylee Countryman				23	24	17	21	0
30	(United States) Jia Zhanbin	19	Ret	18					0
31	(United Arab Emirates) Edoardo Iacobucci	21	20	22	21	22	19	23	0
32	(United Arab Emirates) Zakaria Doleh	20	21	19	26	21	22	22	0
33	(United Arab Emirates) Lucas Pasquinetti				25	20			0
34	(South Africa) Jorden Moodley	22	Ret	21	24	25	24	24	0
Pos	Driver	R1	R2	R3	R1	R2	R1	R2	Pts
Pos	Driver	DUB			YMC1		YMC2		Pts

Colour	Result
Gold	Winner
Silver	Second place
Bronze	Third place
Green	Points classification
Blue	Non-points classification
Blue	Non-classified finish (NC)
Purple	Retired, not classified (Ret)
Red	Did not qualify (DNQ)
Red	Did not pre-qualify (DNPQ)
Black	Disqualified (DSQ)
White	Did not start (DNS)
White	Withdrew (WD)
White	Race cancelled (C)
Blank	Did not practice (DNP)
Blank	Did not arrive (DNA)
Blank	Excluded (EX)

**Bold** – Pole
Italics – Fastest Lap
† — Did not finish, but classified

== See also ==
- 2026 UAE4 Series
