= R-ace GP =

French auto racing team

(France) R-ace GP
- Founded: 2011
- Base: Fontenay-le-Comte, France
- Team principal(s): Thibaut de Mérindol
- Current series: Formula Regional European Championship; Italian F4 Championship; E4 Championship; Le Mans Cup; Formula Regional Middle East; UAE4 Series; Asian Le Mans Series; European Le Mans Series
- Teams' Championships: FR2.0 Eurocup 2017; FR2.0 NEC 2017; FR2.0 Eurocup 2018; FR2.0 Nec 2018; FR2.0 Eurocup 2019; FRECA 2021; FRMEC 2024; F4 Middle East 2025; FRECA 2025; UAE4 Series 2026
- Drivers' Championships: Drivers champions : Renault Sport Trophy 2015 : Andrea Pizzitola; FR2.0 NEC 2017 : Michaël Benyahia; FR2.0 Eurocup 2018 : Max Fewtrell; FR2.0 Eurocup 2019 : Oscar Piastri; FRMEC 2024 : Tuukka Taponen; F4MEC 2025 : Emanuele Olivieri Rookies champions : FR2.0 Eurocup 2012 : Nyck de Vries; FR2.0 NEC 2015 : Max Defourny; FR2.0 Eurocup 2019 : Caio Collet; FRECA 2021 : Isack Hadjar; FRECA 2023 : Martinius Stenshorne; FRMEC 2024 : Tuukka Taponen; UAE4 Series 2026: Kenzo Craigie
- Website: http://www.r-ace-gp.com/

R-ace GP is an auto racing team from France, involved in many areas of motorsport, specifically those involving Renault. They are currently competing in the Formula Regional European Championship, Formula Regional Middle East, F4 Middle East, Italian F4, Euro 4 and Michelin Le Mans Cup in LMP3.

== History ==
R-ace GP was founded in 2011 by Thibaut de Merindol and Cyril Comte. They partook in the Eurocup and NEC championships of Formula Renault 2.0. Their driver line-up included Norman Nato, Pieter Schothorst and Côme Ledogar. In its first year of Formula Renault 2.0, the team scored eighth in the Eurocup championship, with Nato taking two podiums, and ninth in NEC, with Nato and Ledogar taking podiums.

In 2012, the team entered with a line-up of Andrea Pizzitola, Red Bull Junior Pierre Gasly and the McLaren-backed Nyck de Vries. The team climbed up to fifth in both standings, with de Vries taking the team's maiden victory in the NEC championship.

=== 2013 - 2015 ===
The following year, the team formed a close collaboration with ART Grand Prix and was renamed the ART Junior Team. Pizzitola remained with Alexandre Baron, Nico Jamin, Tanart Sathienthirakul, Alberto di Folco and Esteban Ocon joining the team. The team finished runners-up to Tech 1 Racing in the Eurocup standings, with Ocon achieving third place in the driver's standings.

In 2014, the team went forth with a new line-up of Aurélien Panis, Callan O'Keefe, Levin Amweg and Simon Gachet. The team achieved fourth place in both championships with wins from Amweg, O'Keefe and Panis. The following year, Max Defourny, Ukyo Sasahara, Darius Oskoui and Will Palmer (Eurocup only) formed the team's 2015 line-up. The team finished as runners-up to Josef Kaufmann Racing in the NEC championship, with Sasahara and Defourny claiming wins and spots in the top five in the overall standings, and sixth in Eurocup.

=== 2016 - 2019 ===
In 2016, it was announced that the R-ace GP name would return. Defourny and Palmer remained with the team and were joined by newcomer Julien Falchero and Marcus Armstrong in a guest drive. In the championships, the team repeated their feat of 2015 in NEC and claimed third place in Eurocup, with Defourny finishing in the top three of the driver's standings.

In 2017, Palmer and Defourny were contracted to the team for a third season with Robert Shwartzman and Italian F4 driver Raúl Guzman joining the team. For the 2017 NEC Championship, the team signed three drivers from the 2016 French F4 Championship, vice champion Gilles Magnus, third-place finisher Michael Benyahia and race winner Théo Coicaud with karting champion Charles Milesi making his single-seater debut with the team.

In 2018, R-ace GP puts his title back on the line with a new line-up. Max Fewtrell and Victor Martins, both in the Renault Sport Academy, Logan Sargeant and Charles Milesi continued in Eurocup. In the NEC championship, Gabriel Gandulia joins the team.

For the 2019 season, the team signed returnees Oscar Piastri and Aleksandr Smolyar and reigning French F4 champion and Renault junior Caio Collet. R-ace GP also expanded into the ADAC Formula 4 Championship, fielding Gregoire Saucy and László Tóth. The team will also take part in 3 meetings of Italian F4 Championship. The team won the triple crown in Eurocup that season: teams' title for the 3rd year in a row, rookie title with Caio Collet and drivers' title with Australian Oscar Piastri with 7 wins and 320 points.

In July 2019, it was announced R-ace GP would expand into the Toyota Racing Series, collaborating with MTEC Motorsport for the 2020 season.

=== 2020 - 2024 ===
In 2020, R-ace GP is bringing Caio Collet back to Formula Renault Eurocup. He is joined by Petr Ptacek. Competing with Victor Martins for the title, the Brazilian finished runner-up. In ADAC Formula 4, R-ace GP is continuing its development and has put its faith in Victor Bernier, Kirill Smal, Artem Lobanenko and Roe Meyuhas.

In 2021, with Hadrien David, Zane Maloney, Isack Hadjar and Léna Bühler, the team won the team title in Formula Regional. David also finished second in the drivers' standings.

In 2022 and 2023, the team was runner-up in the Formula Regional Championship.

In 2024, the team took part in the Formula Middle East Regional Championship, winning the Team Champion and Driver Champion titles. Tuukka Taponen also won the Rookie Champion title. That same year, the team also took part in the Michelin Le Mans Cup, finishing runner-up.

=== 2025 : Titles in F4 Middle East, Michelin Le Mans Cup and FRECA ===
At the beginning of 2025, R-ace GP won three titles in F4 Middle East: Team Champion, Drivers' Champion (with Emanuele Olivieri) and Drivers' Runner-Up (with Alex Powell, Mercedes junior driver). The team also finished as Runner-Up in Formula Regional Middle East, with Ugo Ugochukwu taking third place in the drivers' standings.

For its return to the Michelin Le Mans Cup, R-ace GP entered three Duqueine D09 LMP3 cars. After a difficult start to the season, the team gained momentum and won brilliantly in the last three races (with pole position and victory). It won the championship at Silverstone with one round to go, clinching the team title with the #85 Duqueine D09 and the drivers' title with Hadrien David and Hugo Schwarze.

In early September, the team announced its participation in the Asian Le Mans Series with one LMP3.

In FRECA, R-ace GP performed very well throughout the season with its three drivers Enzo Deligny, Akshay Bohra and Jin Nakamura. It won the championship in the final at Monza, while Deligny finished third in the drivers' standings.

The team also made good progress in Italian F4, with a double victory for Alex Powell and third place in the championship.

At the end of the year, R-ace GP closed its season in Regional Formula with third place in the Macau Grand Prix (FIA FR World Cup) claimed by Enzo Deligny.

=== 2026 ===
In early 2026, R-ace GP retains its Teams' Championship title in Formula 4 Middle East. Andy Consani finishes runner-up, while Kenzo Craigie completes the podium in the overall standings and wins the Rookie title.

The team is once again runner-up in Formula Regional Middle East, a result matched by Rashid Al Dhaheri in the drivers' standings.

In February, R-ace GP acquires a stake in Duqueine Team, an LMP2 outfit, as part of a "long-term strategic partnership." The team takes on operational management of the LMP2 structure.

In September 2026, R-ace GP wins the team and drivers’ championships in the Michelin Le Mans Cup at Silverstone (with Enzo Peugeot and Danial Frost) for the second year running. The team also secures its very first victory in the ELMS.

That same weekend, the team emerges victorious from the FREC at Hockenheim: securing the Team Championship title, as well as the Drivers’ Championship with Emanuele Olivieri (who had already won the Rookie Championship the week before at Imola).

In October, R-ace GP finishes third in the European Le Mans Series in the LMP3 class.

The team also wins the E4 Drivers’ and Rookies’ Championships with Kenzo Craigie.

== Current series results ==
=== 24 Hours of Le Mans ===
Year	Entrant	No.	Car	Drivers	Class	Laps	Pos.	Class Pos.
2026	(France) Duqueine Team	30	Oreca 07-Gibson	(France) Julien Andlauer (France) Doriane Pin (Netherlands) Richard Verschoor	LMP2	307	DNF	DNF

=== European Le Mans Series ===
European Le Mans Series
Year	Chassis	Number	Drivers	Races	Wins	Podiums	Points	Driver Standings	Team Standings
2026	Duqueine D09	85	(France) Fabien Michal	6	1	3	76	**3rd**	**3rd**
2026	Duqueine D09	85	(Germany) Hugo Schwarze	6	1	3	76	**3rd**	**3rd**
2026	Duqueine D09	85	(Luxembourg) Pierre-Alexandre Provost	6	1	3	76	**3rd**	**3rd**

=== Asian Le Mans Series ===
Asian Le Mans Series
Year	Chassis	Number	Drivers	Races	Wins	Podiums	Points	Driver Standings	Team Standings
2025-26	Duqueine D09	85	(France) Fabien Michal	4	0	0	30	13th	8th
2025-26	Duqueine D09	85	(Luxembourg) Pierre-Alexandre Provost	4	0	0	30	13th	8th
2025-26	Duqueine D09	85	(Australia) Zack Scoular	2	0	0	12	16th	8th
2025-26	Duqueine D09	85	(Singapore) Danial Frost	2	0	0	12	17th	8th
2025-26	Duqueine D09	85	(Lebanon) Shahan Sarkissian	2	0	0	12	17th	8th
2025-26	Duqueine D09	85	(Germany) Hugo Schwarze	2	0	0	8	19th	8th
2025-26	Duqueine D09	85	(Switzerland) Léna Bühler	2	0	0	0	21st	8th

=== Le Mans Cup ===
Michelin Le Mans Cup
Year	Chassis	Number	Drivers	Races	Victories	Podiums	Points	Driver Standings	Team Standings
2024	Duqueine D08	85	(France) Hadrien David	7	1	3	68	**2nd**	**2nd**
2024	Duqueine D08	85	(France) Fabien Michal	7	1	3	68	**2nd**	**2nd**
2025	Duqueine D09	85	(France) Hadrien David	6	2	4	90	**1st**	**1st**
2025	Duqueine D09	85	(Germany) Hugo Schwarze	6	2	4	90	**1st**	**1st**
2025	Duqueine D09	86	(France) Edgar Pierre	6	0	0	20	10th	**1st**
2025	Duqueine D09	86	(Sweden) Joel Granfors	2	0	0	14	NC	**1st**
2025	Duqueine D09	86	(Japan) Jin Nakamura	2	0	0	0	NC	**1st**
2025	Duqueine D09	86	(France) Antoine Doquin	2	0	0	6	17th	**1st**
2025	Duqueine D09	88 (PRO / AM)	(France) Romano Ricci	6	0	1	29	9th	5th
2025	Duqueine D09	88 (PRO / AM)	(France) Fabien Lavergne	4	0	1	28	NC	5th
2025	Duqueine D09	88 (PRO / AM)	(United Kingdom) Ewan Thomas	1	0	0	1	29th	5th
2026	Duqueine D09	85	(France) Enzo Peugeot	6	3	5	131	**Champions**	**Champions**
2026	Duqueine D09	85	(Singapore) Danial Frost	6	3	5	131	**Champions**	**Champions**
2026	Duqueine D09	86	(Australia) Zack Scoular	6	0	1	19	12th	12th
2026	Duqueine D09	86	(Switzerland) Léna Bühler	6	0	1	19	12th	12th

=== Italian F4 Championship ===
Italian F4 Championship results
Year	Car	Drivers	Races	Wins	Poles	F/Laps	Podiums	Points	D.C.	T.C.
2019	Tatuus F4-T014	(Switzerland) Grégoire Saucy	9	0	0	0	0	28	15th	8th
2019	Tatuus F4-T014	(Hungary) László Tóth	9	0	0	0	0	0	38th	8th
2020	Tatuus F4-T014	(Russia) Kirill Smal	2	0	0	0	0	30†	15th†	13th
2020	Tatuus F4-T014	(France) Victor Bernier	3	0	0	0	0	1	28th	13th
2021	Tatuus F4-T014	(France) Victor Bernier	6	0	0	0	0	30	13th	7th
2021	Tatuus F4-T014	(France) Sami Meguetounif	6	0	0	0	0	22	19th	7th
2021	Tatuus F4-T014	(France) Marcus Amand	6	0	0	0	0	0	40th	7th
2022	Tatuus F4-T421	(France) Hadrien David	2	0	0	0	0	10	18th	7th
2022	Tatuus F4-T421	(Republic of Ireland) Adam Fitzgerald	6	0	0	0	0	4	22nd	7th
2022	Tatuus F4-T421	(Denmark) Frederik Lund	20	0	1	0	0	0	29th	7th
2022	Tatuus F4-T421	(Australia) Marcos Flack	6	0	0	0	0	0	39th	7th
2022	Tatuus F4-T421	(Italy) Giovanni Maschio^{†}	16	0	0	0	0	0	43rd	7th
2022	Tatuus F4-T421	(France) Raphaël Narac	2	0	0	0	0	0	50th	7th
2023	Tatuus F4-T421	(France) Raphaël Narac	21	0	0	0	0	11	19th	6th
2023	Tatuus F4-T421	(Italy) Matteo De Palo	3	0	0	0	0	10	20th	6th
2023	Tatuus F4-T421	(United Arab Emirates) Matteo Quintarelli	21	0	0	0	0	0	31st	6th
2023	Tatuus F4-T421	(Singapore) Kabir Anurag^{‡}	9	0	0	0	0	0	41st	6th
2024	Tatuus F4-T421	(Finland) Luka Sammalisto	15	0	0	0	0	11	18th	6th
2024	Tatuus F4-T421	(Italy) Enzo Yeh	21	0	0	0	0	6	23rd	6th
2025	Tatuus F4-T421	(Italy) Emanuele Olivieri	20	0	2	2	4	140	7th	**3rd**
2025	Tatuus F4-T421	(United States) Alex Powell	20	2	2	1	4	126	9th	**3rd**
2025	Tatuus F4-T421	(Romania) Luca Viișoreanu٭	15	0	0	0	0	14	24th	**3rd**
2025	Tatuus F4-T421	(Italy) Oleksandr Savinkov	18	0	0	1	0	1	27th	**3rd**
2025	Tatuus F4-T421	(United Kingdom) Emily Cotty	18	0	0	0	0	0	31st	**3rd**
2025	Tatuus F4-T421	(France) Andy Consani	5	0	0	0	0	0	32nd	**3rd**
2025	Tatuus F4-T421	(Israel) Guy Albag	20	0	0	0	0	0	37th	**3rd**
2026	Tatuus F4-T421	(France) Andy Consani	20	1	0	1	1	120	12th*	**3rd***
2026	Tatuus F4-T421	(Hungary) Tamás Gender	20	0	0	0	0	2	43rd*	**3rd***
2026	Tatuus F4-T421	(United Kingdom) Kenzo Craigie	20	2	0	1	6	226	5th*	**3rd***
2026	Tatuus F4-T421	(United States) Payton Westcott	17	0	0	0	0	1	44th*	**3rd***
2026	Tatuus F4-T421	(United Kingdom) Emily Cotty	17	0	0	0	0	1	44th*	**3rd***
2026	Tatuus F4-T421	(United Kingdom) Jesse Phillips								**3rd***

^{†} Maschio raced for AS Motorsport for thirteen races in 2022.

^{‡} Anurag raced for US Racing for six races in 2023.

٭ Viișoreanu drove for Real Racing until round 5.

=== Euro 4 Championship ===
Euro 4 Championship results
Year	Car	Drivers	Races	Wins	Poles	F/Laps	Podiums	Points	D.C.	T.C.
2023	Tatuus F4-T421	(France) Raphaël Narac	3	0	0	0	0	1	18th	5th
2023	Tatuus F4-T421	(United Arab Emirates) Matteo Quintarelli	3	0	0	0	0	0	30th	5th
2024	Tatuus F4-T421	(Finland) Luka Sammalisto	6	0	0	0	0	4	20th	7th
2024	Tatuus F4-T421	(Italy) Enzo Yeh	9	0	0	0	0	0	25th	7th
2025	Tatuus F4-T421	(United States) Alex Powell	9	1	1	1	3	86	5th	4th
2025	Tatuus F4-T421	(France) Andy Consani	6	0	0	0	0	3	18th	4th
2025	Tatuus F4-T421	(Italy) Oleksandr Savinkov	9	0	0	0	0	1	21st	4th
2025	Tatuus F4-T421	(Israel) Guy Albag	9	0	0	0	0	0	25th	4th
2025	Tatuus F4-T421	(United Kingdom) Emily Cotty	9	0	0	0	0	0	27th	4th
2026	Tatuus F4-T421	(France) Andy Consani	9	0	1	0	2	131	3rd	3rd*
2026	Tatuus F4-T421	(United Kingdom) Kenzo Craigie	9	4	3	4	6	190	**Champion**	3rd*
2026	Tatuus F4-T421	(Greece) Philippe Armand Karras	9	0	0	0	0	20	22nd	3rd*
2026	Tatuus F4-T421	(Greece) Jean-Paul Karras	9	0	0	0	0	32	19th	3rd*
2026	Tatuus F4-T421	(Hungary) Tamas Gender	6	0	0	0	0	0	36th	3rd*

=== Formula Regional European Championship ===
Year	Chassis	Tyres	Drivers	Races	Wins	Poles	F. Laps	Podiums	D.C.	Pts	T.C.	Pts
2021	Tatuus F3 T-318-Alpine	P	(France) Isack Hadjar	20	2	1	3	6	5th	166	1st	481
2021	Tatuus F3 T-318-Alpine	P	(France) Hadrien David	20	2	1	2	9	**2nd**	**209**	1st	481
2021	Tatuus F3 T-318-Alpine	P	(Switzerland) Léna Bühler	17	0	0	0	0	38th	0	1st	481
2021	Tatuus F3 T-318-Alpine	P	(Barbados) Zane Maloney	20	1	1	1	8	4th	170	1st	481
2021	Tatuus F3 T-318-Alpine	P	(France) Sami Meguetounif	4	0	0	0	0	NC	0	1st	481
2022	Tatuus F3 T-318-Alpine	P	(Switzerland) Léna Bühler	3	0	0	0	0	39th	0	2nd	421
2022	Tatuus F3 T-318-Alpine	P	(Spain) Lorenzo Fluxá	19	0	0	0	1	12th	49	2nd	421
2022	Tatuus F3 T-318-Alpine	P	(France) Hadrien David	20	3	3	4	7	4th	222	2nd	421
2022	Tatuus F3 T-318-Alpine	P	(Brazil) Gabriel Bortoleto	20	2	2	1	5	6th	174	2nd	421
2023	Tatuus F3 T-318-Alpine	P	(Norway) Martinius Stenshorne	20	5	3	3	11	**2nd**	**261**	2nd	510
2023	Tatuus F3 T-318-Alpine	P	(Germany) Tim Tramnitz	20	3	4	1	10	**3rd**	**239**	2nd	510
2023	Tatuus F3 T-318-Alpine	P	(Peru) Matías Zagazeta	20	0	0	0	0	22nd	12	2nd	510
2024	Tatuus F3 T-318-Alpine	P	(Finland) Tuukka Taponen	20	4	3	2	7	**3rd**	**198**	2nd	312
2024	Tatuus F3 T-318-Alpine	P	(Malta) Zachary David	20	0	0	0	1	13th	57	2nd	312
2024	Tatuus F3 T-318-Alpine	P	(France) Enzo Deligny	20	0	0	0	0	12th	61	2nd	312
2025	Tatuus F3 T-318-Alpine	P	(Japan) Jin Nakamura	20	0	0	3	1	10th	81	1st	455
2025	Tatuus F3 T-318-Alpine	P	(France) Enzo Deligny	20	4	4	2	9	**3rd**	**235**	1st	455
2025	Tatuus F3 T-318-Alpine	P	(India) Akshay Bohra	20	1	1	1	6	6th	159	1st	455
2026	Tatuus T-326-Toyota	P	(Japan) Yuki Sano	19	1	1	1	2	9th	67	1st	465
2026	Tatuus T-326-Toyota	P	(United Arab Emirates) Rashid Al Dhaheri	19	3	1	2	8	4th	180	1st	465
2026	Tatuus T-326-Toyota	P	(Italy) Emanuele Olivieri	19	2	2	3	9	**1st**	**218**	1st	465

==== In detail ====
(key) (Races in bold indicate pole position) (Races in italics indicate fastest lap)

Year	Drivers	1	2	3	4	5	6	7	8	9	10	11	12	13	14	15	16	17	18	19	20	T.C.	Points
2021		IMO; 1	IMO; 2	CAT; 1	CAT; 2	MCO; 1	MCO; 2	LEC; 1	LEC; 2	ZAN; 1	ZAN; 2	SPA; 1	SPA; 2	RBR; 1	RBR; 2	VAL; 1	VAL; 2	MUG; 1	MUG; 2	MNZ; 1	MNZ; 2	1st	481
2021	(France) Isack Hadjar	7	12	7	3^{F}	1^{P F}	2	21	4	6	11	7	9	12	6	9	4	12	13	2^{F}	1	1st	481
2021	(France) Hadrien David	3^{F}	4	12	Ret	4	3	1^{F}	10	3	12	2	3	2	Ret	7	6	23	6	1^{P}	3	1st	481
2021	(Switzerland) Léna Bühler			25	27	20	DNQ	29	30	24	30	27	27	Ret	26	30	25	29	32	30	23	1st	481
2021	(Barbados) Zane Maloney	Ret	3	9	9	2	1^{P F}	4	6	15	8	3	2	9	3	8	8	11	14	3	7	1st	481
2021	(France) Sami Meguetounif																	22	20	15	13	1st	481
2022		MNZ; 1	MNZ; 2	IMO; 1	IMO; 2	MCO; 1	MCO; 2	LEC; 1	LEC; 2	ZAN; 1	ZAN; 2	HUN; 1	HUN; 2	SPA; 1	SPA; 2	RBR; 1	RBR; 2	CAT; 1	CAT; 2	MUG; 1	MUG; 2	2nd	421
2022	(Switzerland) Léna Bühler	Ret	Ret	WD	WD	26	DNQ															2nd	421
2022	(Spain) Lorenzo Fluxá	3	23	11	11	DNQ	18	8	8	15	14	14	13	5	Ret	9	Ret	16	9	13	5	2nd	421
2022	(France) Hadrien David	4	7	10	4	1^{P}	2	6	4^{F}	12^{F}	7	8	1^{P}	18	2^{F}	13	1^{P}	2^{F}	2	8	4	2nd	421
2022	(Brazil) Gabriel Bortoleto	6	9	7	3	6	5	4	5	Ret	8	9	3	14	1	15	5	7^{F}	1^{P}	Ret	2^{P}	2nd	421
2023		IMO; 1	IMO; 2	CAT; 1	CAT; 2	HUN; 1	HUN; 2	SPA; 1	SPA; 2	MUG; 1	MUG; 2	LEC; 1	LEC; 2	RBR; 1	RBR; 2	MNZ; 1	MNZ; 2	ZAN; 1	ZAN; 2	HOC; 1	HOC; 2	2nd	510
2023	(Norway) Martinius Stenshorne	1^{P F}	2	7	12	1^{P}	1^{F}	3	17	1^{P F}	3	3	4	18	17	3	Ret	4	6	2	1	2nd	510
2023	(Germany) Tim Tramnitz	6	Ret^{P}	1	1^{P}	8	16	2	2^{P}	3	7	4	3	3	12	Ret	3	6	4	1^{F}	2^{P}	2nd	510
2023	(Peru) Matías Zagazeta	13	5	14	23	27	Ret	20	23	20	24†	24	19	22	21	21	27	15	10	Ret	23	2nd	510
2024		HOC; 1	HOC; 2	SPA; 1	SPA; 2	ZAN; 1	ZAN; 2	HUN; 1	HUN; 2	MUG; 1	MUG; 2	LEC; 1	LEC; 2	IMO; 1	IMO; 2	RBR; 1	RBR; 2	CAT; 1	CAT; 2	MNZ; 1	MNZ; 2	2nd	312
2024	(Finland) Tuukka Taponen	2	9	13	5	1	6	1^{P F}	1^{P F}	1^{P}	4	5	Ret	2	Ret	12	Ret	2	Ret	9	Ret	2nd	312
2024	(Malta) Zachary David	Ret	16	3	12	8	18	7	12	12	6	16	7	27	4	Ret	9	21	13	14	8	2nd	312
2024	(France) Enzo Deligny	10	4	9	8	6	12	14	5	18	17	19	5	4	Ret	16	Ret	12	9	15	16	2nd	312
2025		MIS; 1	MIS; 2	SPA; 1	SPA; 2	ZAN; 1	ZAN; 2	HUN; 1	HUN; 2	LEC; 1	LEC; 2	IMO; 1	IMO; 2	RBR; 1	RBR; 2	CAT; 1	CAT; 2	HOC; 1	HOC; 2	MNZ; 1	MNZ; 2	1st	455
2025	(Japan) Jin Nakamura	Ret	10	16	7	13	5^{F}	13	25	8	5	25^{F}	Ret	8^{F}	3	4	9	7	10	Ret	6	1st	455
2025	(France) Enzo Deligny	10	4	3	1^{F}	5	4	3	DSQ^{P}	7	10	1^{P}	2	3	2	Ret	1^{P F}	5	1^{P}	9	21	1st	455
2025	(India) Akshay Bohra	9	14	7	15	3	9	8	4	4	3	3	1^{P F}	5	12	12	3	2	8	Ret	10	1st	455
2026		RBR; 1	RBR; 2	RBR; 3	ZAN; 1	ZAN; 2	SPA; 1	SPA; 2	SPA; 3	MNZ; 1	MNZ; 2	MNZ; 3	HUN; 1	HUN; 2	LEC; 1	LEC; 2	IMO; 1	IMO; 2	IMO; 3	HOC; 1	HOC; 2	1st	465
2026	(Japan) Yuki Sano	10	12	Ret	17	16	4	C	16	Ret	22^{F}	3	1^{P}	18	11	17	17	Ret	Ret	14	4	1st	465
2026	(United Arab Emirates) Rashid Al Dhaheri	2	1	5	5	4	2	C	3^{F}	11	1	9	2	1^{P}	26	6	Ret	6	10	3	11^{F}	1st	465
2026	(Italy) Emanuele Olivieri	22	7	Ret	3^{F}	6	6	C	8	2	Ret	1^{P}	4^{F}	2	2	2	1^{P F}	9	2	Ret	2	1st	465

=== Formula Regional Middle East Championship / Formula Regional Middle East Trophy ===
Year	Car	Drivers	Races	Wins	Poles	F/Laps	Podiums	Points	D.C.	T.C.
2023	Tatuus F3 T-318	(Singapore) Nikhil Bohra	15	1	0	1	2	73	9th	5th
2023	Tatuus F3 T-318	(Peru) Matías Zagazeta	9	0	0	0	1	28	17th	5th
2023	Tatuus F3 T-318	(Norway) Martinius Stenshorne	9	0	0	0	0	20	18th	5th
2023	Tatuus F3 T-318	(Germany) Tim Tramnitz	6	0	0	0	0	14	20th	5th
2023	Tatuus F3 T-318	(Hungary) Levente Révész	15	0	0	0	0	9	25th	5th
2023	Tatuus F3 T-318	(Italy) Francesco Braschi	6	0	0	0	0	6	27th	5th
2024	Tatuus F3 T-318	(Finland) Tuukka Taponen	15	5	5	7	9	255	**1st**	**1st**
2024	Tatuus F3 T-318	(Malta) Zachary David	15	0	0	0	4	112	4th	**1st**
2024	Tatuus F3 T-318	(Norway) Martinius Stenshorne	9	0	0	1	4	100	8th	**1st**
2024	Tatuus F3 T-318	(United Kingdom) Kanato Le	6	0	0	0	0	1	22nd	**1st**
2024	Tatuus F3 T-318	(Mexico) Jesse Carrasquedo Jr.	14	0	0	0	0	0	24th	**1st**
2025	Tatuus F3 T-318	(United States) Ugo Ugochukwu	15	1	1	2	6	205	**3rd**	**2nd**
2025	Tatuus F3 T-318	(France) Enzo Deligny	15	1	0	2	3	147	5th	**2nd**
2025	Tatuus F3 T-318	(Japan) Jin Nakamura	15	1	0	0	2	94	10th	**2nd**
2025	Tatuus F3 T-318	(India) Akshay Bohra	15	1	0	1	1	48	14th	**2nd**
2026	Tatuus F3 T-326	(United Arab Emirates) Rashid Al Dhaheri	11	3	1	3	4	139	**2nd**	**2nd**
2026	Tatuus F3 T-326	(Japan) Yuki Sano	11	0	0	0	0	37	13th	**2nd**
2026	Tatuus F3 T-326	(Italy) Emanuele Olivieri	5	0	0	1	1	31	14th	**2nd**
2026	Tatuus F3 T-326	(China) Gerrard Xie	6	0	0	0	0	1	23rd	**2nd**

=== Formula 4 UAE Championship / F4 Middle East Championship / UAE4 Series ===
Year	Car	Drivers	Races	Wins	Poles	F/Laps	Podiums	Points	D.C.	T.C.
2022	Tatuus F4-T421	(Norway) Martinius Stenshorne	19	0	0	0	1	72	10th	7th
2022	Tatuus F4-T421	(Singapore) Nikhil Bohra	20	0	0	0	0	17	20th	7th
2022	Tatuus F4-T421	(Russia) Maksim Arkhangelskiy	4	0	0	0	0	0	31st	7th
2022	Tatuus F4-T421	(Russia) Victoria Blokhina	16	0	0	0	0	0	37th	7th
2023	Tatuus F4-T421	(Malta) Zachary David	15	1	0	0	2	59	8th	7th
2023	Tatuus F4-T421	(Mexico) Jesse Carrasquedo Jr.	15	0	0	1	0	20	18th	7th
2023	Tatuus F4-T421	(Latvia) Alexander Abkhazava	15	0	0	0	0	2	28th	7th
2023	Tatuus F4-T421	(France) Raphaël Narac	12	0	0	0	0	0	32nd	7th
2024	Tatuus F4-T421	(Spain) Enzo Deligny	9	1	0	0	2	73	8th	6th
2024	Tatuus F4-T421	(Italy) Enzo Yeh	15	0	0	0	1	37	14th	6th
2024	Tatuus F4-T421	(France) Jules Caranta†	15	0	0	0	0	37	15th	6th
2024	Tatuus F4-T421	(Finland) Luka Sammalisto	15	0	0	0	0	12	20th	6th
2024	Tatuus F4-T421	(France) Raphaël Narac†	15	0	0	0	0	4	23rd	6th
2025	Tatuus F4-T421	(Italy) Emanuele Olivieri	15	6	5	9	13	339	**1st**	**1st**
2025	Tatuus F4-T421	(United States) Alex Powell	15	5	4	2	9	281	**2nd**	**1st**
2025	Tatuus F4-T421	(Italy) Oleksandr Savinkov	15	0	0	0	0	64	11th	**1st**
2025	Tatuus F4-T421	(United Kingdom) Emily Cotty	15	0	0	0	0	3	21st	**1st**
2026	Tatuus F4-T421	(France) Andy Consani	15	3	3	6	9	183	**2nd**	**1st**
2026	Tatuus F4-T421	(United Kingdom) Kenzo Craigie	15	1	2	3	0	119	**3rd**	**1st**
2026	Tatuus F4-T421	(United Kingdom) Emily Cotty	15	0	0	0	1	37	10th	**1st**
2026	Tatuus F4-T421	(Germany) Elia Weiss	15	0	0	0	0	21	16th	**1st**
2026	Tatuus F4-T421	(Hungary) Tamás Gender	15	0	0	0	0	0	32nd	**1st**

† Shared results with Saintéloc Racing

== Former series results ==
=== Formula Renault 2.0 NEC ===
Formula Renault 2.0 NEC results
Year	Car	Drivers	Races	Wins	Podiums	Points	D.C.	T.C.
2011	Barazi-Epsilon–Renault	(Netherlands) Pieter Schothorst	11	0	1	91	18th	9th
2011	Barazi-Epsilon–Renault	(France) Côme Ledogar	9	0	1	91	19th	9th
2011	Barazi-Epsilon–Renault	(France) Norman Nato	7	0	1	56	25th	9th
2012	Barazi-Epsilon–Renault	(Netherlands) Nyck de Vries	11	1	4	166	10th	5th
2012	Barazi-Epsilon–Renault	(France) Andrea Pizzitola	11	0	4	141	13th	5th
2012	Barazi-Epsilon–Renault	(France) Pierre Gasly	7	0	1	78	23rd	5th
2013	Tatuus–Renault	(France) Andrea Pizzitola	14	1	3	190	6th	2nd
2013	Tatuus–Renault	(France) Nico Jamin	18	0	1	144	7th	2nd
2013	Tatuus–Renault	(Thailand) Tanart Sathienthirakul	18	0	0	123	11th	2nd
2013	Tatuus–Renault	(France) Esteban Ocon	8	1	3	122	12th	2nd
2013	Tatuus–Renault	(Italy) Alberto Di Folco	9	0	0	73	20th	2nd
2013	Tatuus–Renault	(Brazil) Thiago Vivacqua	5	0	0	8	42nd	2nd
2013	Tatuus–Renault	(France) Alexandre Baron	5	0	0	0	54th	2nd
2014	Tatuus–Renault	(South Africa) Callan O'Keeffe	15	1	3	187	7th	4th
2014	Tatuus–Renault	(United Kingdom) Jake Hughes	15	0	1	152	8th	4th
2014	Tatuus–Renault	(Switzerland) Levin Amweg	7	1	4	107	15th	4th
2014	Tatuus–Renault	(France) Aurélien Panis	6	1	2	77	19th	4th
2014	Tatuus–Renault	(Australia) James Allen	2	0	0	0	NC	4th
2015	Tatuus–Renault	(Japan) Ukyo Sasahara	21	2	8	296	3rd	2nd
2015	Tatuus–Renault	(Belgium) Max Defourny	16	2	4	218	4th	2nd
2015	Tatuus–Renault	(Switzerland) Darius Oskoui	16	0	0	143	9th	2nd
2016	Tatuus–Renault	(Belgium) Max Defourny	15	3	9	285	2nd	2nd
2016	Tatuus–Renault	(United Kingdom) Will Palmer	13	0	3	126	12th	2nd
2016	Tatuus–Renault	(France) Julien Falchero	15	0	0	124	13th	2nd
2016	Tatuus–Renault	(New Zealand) Marcus Armstrong	2	0	0	23	24th	2nd
2017	Tatuus–Renault	(Morocco) Michael Benyahia	11	0	4	163	1st	1st
2017	Tatuus–Renault	(Belgium) Gilles Magnus	11	2	2	161	2nd	1st
2017	Tatuus–Renault	(France) Théo Coicaud	11	0	1	129.5	4th	1st
2017	Tatuus–Renault	(France) Charles Milesi	11	1	2	106	7th	1st
2018	Tatuus–Renault	(Argentina) Gabriel Gandulia	12	0	8	216	3rd	1st
2018	Tatuus–Renault	(United States) Logan Sargeant	12	1	3	87	5th	1st
2018	Tatuus–Renault	(France) Victor Martins	12	1	2	83	6th	1st
2018	Tatuus–Renault	(France) Charles Milesi	12	0	1	57	9th	1st
2018	Tatuus–Renault	(United Kingdom) Max Fewtrell	10	0	1	24	15th	1st

=== Renault Sport Trophy ===
Renault Sport Trophy results
Year	Car	Category	Drivers	Races	Wins	Podiums	Poles	Fast laps	Points	D.C.	T.C.
2015	Renault Sport R.S. 01	Elite	(France) Andrea Pizzitola	9	2	6	3	2	140	1st	2nd
2015	Renault Sport R.S. 01	Prestige	(Slovakia) Richard Gonda	9	3	5	6	3	123	2nd	2nd
2015	Renault Sport R.S. 01	Elite	(Netherlands) Indy Dontje	9	1	4	0	0	96	4th	2nd
2015	Renault Sport R.S. 01	Prestige	(Spain) Toni Forné	9	0	3	0	0	81	6th	2nd
2016	Renault Sport R.S. 01	Elite	(Estonia) Kevin Korjus	9	1	4	1	0	111	2nd	3rd
2016	Renault Sport R.S. 01	Prestige	(Sweden) Fredrik Blomstedt	9	1	5	2	3	115	3rd	3rd
2016	Renault Sport R.S. 01	Prestige	(France) Philippe Haezebrouck	3	0	0	0	0	0	NC†	3rd
2016	Renault Sport R.S. 01	Elite	(United Kingdom) Raoul Owens	9	0	0	0	0	37	9th	3rd
2016	Renault Sport R.S. 01	Prestige	(Spain) Toni Forné	3	0	0	0	0	24	10th	3rd
2016	Renault Sport R.S. 01	Prestige	(France) Jean-Marc Merlin	1	0	0	0	0	0	20th	3rd

^{†} Guest driver (ineligible for points)

=== Eurocup Formula Renault 2.0 ===
Eurocup Formula Renault 2.0 results
Year	Car	Drivers	Races	Wins	Podiums	Points	D.C.	T.C.
2011	Barazi-Epsilon–Renault	(France) Norman Nato	14	0	2	58	11th	8th
2011	Barazi-Epsilon–Renault	(France) Côme Ledogar	14	0	0	9	19th	8th
2011	Barazi-Epsilon–Renault	(Netherlands) Pieter Schothorst	14	0	0	1	24th	8th
2012	Barazi-Epsilon–Renault	(Netherlands) Nyck de Vries	14	0	2	78	5th	5th
2012	Barazi-Epsilon–Renault	(France) Pierre Gasly	14	0	2	49	10th	5th
2012	Barazi-Epsilon–Renault	(France) Andrea Pizzitola	14	0	0	12	21st	5th
2013	Tatuus–Renault	(France) Esteban Ocon	14	2	5	159	3rd	2nd
2013	Tatuus–Renault	(France) Andrea Pizzitola	14	0	1	39	13th	2nd
2013	Tatuus–Renault	(France) Alexandre Baron	8	0	0	0	27th	2nd
2013	Tatuus–Renault	(France) Nico Jamin	2	0	0	0	NC†	2nd
2014	Tatuus–Renault	(France) Aurélien Panis	14	1	2	82	9th	4th
2014	Tatuus–Renault	(Switzerland) Levin Amweg	12	0	0	42	13th	4th
2014	Tatuus–Renault	(South Africa) Callan O'Keeffe	14	0	0	28	16th	4th
2014	Tatuus–Renault	(France) Simon Gachet	14	0	0	10	19th	4th
2015	Tatuus–Renault	(Japan) Ukyo Sasahara	17	1	4	116	7th	6th
2015	Tatuus–Renault	(Switzerland) Darius Oskoui	17	0	1	36	13th	6th
2015	Tatuus–Renault	(Belgium) Max Defourny	7	0	0	0	NC†	6th
2015	Tatuus–Renault	(United Kingdom) Will Palmer	3	0	0	0	NC†	6th
2016	Tatuus–Renault	(Belgium) Max Defourny	15	1	8	188.5	3rd	3rd
2016	Tatuus–Renault	(United Kingdom) Will Palmer	15	1	2	76	7th	3rd
2016	Tatuus–Renault	(France) Julien Falchero	15	0	0	32.5	13th	3rd
2016	Tatuus–Renault	(New Zealand) Marcus Armstrong	2	0	0	0	NC†	3rd
2017	Tatuus–Renault	(United Kingdom) Will Palmer	23	3	10	298	2nd	1st
2017	Tatuus–Renault	(Russia) Robert Shwartzman	23	6	11	285	3rd	1st
2017	Tatuus–Renault	(Belgium) Max Defourny	23	1	10	255	4th	1st
2017	Tatuus–Renault	(Mexico) Raúl Guzmán	23	0	0	13	17th	1st
2017	Tatuus–Renault	(France) Théo Coicaud	7	0	0	0	NC†	1st
2017	Tatuus–Renault	(France) Charles Milesi	10	0	0	0	NC†	1st
2017	Tatuus–Renault	(Morocco) Michaël Benyahia	7	0	0	0	NC†	1st
2017	Tatuus–Renault	(Belgium) Gilles Magnus	3	0	0	0	NC†	1st
2017	Tatuus–Renault	(United States) Logan Sargeant	3	0	0	0	NC†	1st
2018	Tatuus–Renault	(United Kingdom) Max Fewtrell	20	6	11	275.5	1st	1st
2018	Tatuus–Renault	(United States) Logan Sargeant	20	3	7	218	4th	1st
2018	Tatuus–Renault	(France) Victor Martins	20	2	6	186	5th	1st
2018	Tatuus–Renault	(France) Charles Milesi	20	2	4	122.5	7th	1st
2019	Tatuus F3 T-318–Renault	(Australia) Oscar Piastri	20	7	11	320	1st	1st
2019	Tatuus F3 T-318–Renault	(Brazil) Caio Collet	20	0	5	207	5th	1st
2019	Tatuus F3 T-318–Renault	(Russia) Aleksandr Smolyar	20	3	10	255	3rd	1st
2019	Tatuus F3 T-318–Renault	(Switzerland) Grégoire Saucy	4	0	0	0	NC†	1st
2020	Tatuus F3 T-318–Renault	(Brazil) Caio Collet	20	5	12	304	2nd	2nd
2020	Tatuus F3 T-318–Renault	(Czech Republic) Petr Ptáček	14	0	0	39	14th	2nd
2020	Tatuus F3 T-318–Renault	(Russia) Michael Belov	10	0	0	40	13th	2nd
2020	Tatuus F3 T-318–Renault	(United Kingdom) Johnathan Hoggard	2	0	0	0	22nd	2nd
2020	Tatuus F3 T-318–Renault	(Finland) Elias Seppänen	2	0	0	0	NC†	2nd

^{†} Guest driver (ineligible for points)

=== Toyota Racing Series ===
Year	Car	Drivers	Races	Wins	Poles	Fast laps	Podiums	Points	D.C.
2020	Tatuus FT-60	(Czech Republic) Petr Ptacek	15	0	1	0	3	241	5th
2020	Tatuus FT-60	(Brazil) Caio Collet	15	1	1	2	1	219	7th
2020	Tatuus FT-60	(Australia) Jackson Walls	15	1	1	0	1	160	10th
2020	Tatuus FT-60	(Denmark) Oliver Rasmussen	15	0	0	1	2	158	11th
2020	Tatuus FT-60	(Sweden) Lucas Petersson	15	0	0	0	0	127	12th

=== ADAC Formula 4 ===
ADAC Formula 4 results
Year	Car	Drivers	Races	Wins	Poles	F/Laps	Podiums	Points	D.C.	T.C.
2019	Tatuus F4-T014	(Russia) Michael Belov	17	1	0	1	2	122	8th	4th
2019	Tatuus F4-T014	(Switzerland) Grégoire Saucy	20	0	0	0	2	95	12th	4th
2019	Tatuus F4-T014	(Hungary) László Tóth	20	0	0	0	0	2	20th	4th
2019	Tatuus F4-T014	(France) Hadrien David	6	0	0	0	0	0	NC†	4th
2020	Tatuus F4-T014	(France) Victor Bernier	21	2	0	2	6	225	5th	3rd
2020	Tatuus F4-T014	(Russia) Kirill Smal^{†}	21	0	1	0	3	91	9th	3rd
2020	Tatuus F4-T014	(Russia) Artem Lobanenko	9	0	0	0	0	24	13th	3rd
2020	Tatuus F4-T014	(Israel) Roee Meyuhas	15	0	0	0	0	20	14th	3rd
2021	Tatuus F4-T014	(France) Victor Bernier	18	1	0	2	4	167	4th	3rd
2021	Tatuus F4-T014	(France) Sami Meguetounif	18	0	0	0	0	61	11th	3rd
2021	Tatuus F4-T014	(France) Marcus Amand	18	0	0	0	0	37	12th	3rd
2021	Tatuus F4-T014	(United States) Nikhil Bohra	3	0	0	0	0	0	22nd	3rd
2021	Tatuus F4-T014	(Hungary) Levente Révész	6	0	0	0	0	0	NC†	3rd
2022	Tatuus F4-T421	(Costa Rica) Frederik Lund	3	0	0	0	0	0	NC†	N/A†
2022	Tatuus F4-T421	(Australia) Marcos Flack	3	0	0	0	0	0	NC†	N/A†

^{†} Kirill Smal raced for Prema Powerteam for nine races in 2020.

=== Formula Regional Asian Championship ===
Year	Car	Drivers	Races	Wins	Poles	F/Laps	Podiums	Points	D.C.	T.C.
2022	Tatuus F3 T-318	(France) Hadrien David	6	2	1	3	2	64	9th	5th
2022	Tatuus F3 T-318	(Spain) Lorenzo Fluxá	15	0	0	0	1	64	10th	5th
2022	Tatuus F3 T-318	(Brazil) Gabriel Bortoleto	6	1	0	0	1	46	14th	5th
2022	Tatuus F3 T-318	(Italy) Francesco Braschi	9	0	0	0	0	3	22nd	5th
2022	Tatuus F3 T-318	(Monaco) Oliver Goethe	13	0	0	0	0	1	25th	5th
2022	Tatuus F3 T-318	(Switzerland) Léna Bühler	6	0	0	0	0	0	29th	5th

=== Formula 4 South East Asia Championship ===
Year	Car	Drivers	Races	Wins	Poles	F/Laps	Podiums	Points	D.C.	T.C.
2023	Tatuus F4-T421	(France) Hadrien David	3	3	2	0	3	75	3rd	4th
2023	Tatuus F4-T421	(France) Raphaël Narac	3	0	0	1	1	28	13th	4th

== Timeline ==
Current series
Italian F4 Championship	2018–present
Formula Regional European Championship	2021–present
UAE4 Series	2022–present
Formula Regional Middle East Trophy	2023–present
Euro 4 Championship	2023–present
Le Mans Cup	2024–present
Former series
Formula Renault Northern European Cup	2011–2018
Renault Sport Trophy	2015–2016
Formula Renault Eurocup	2011–2020
ADAC Formula 4	2019–2022
Toyota Racing Series	2020
Formula Regional Asian Championship	2022
Formula 4 South East Asia Championship	2023
Prototype Winter Series	2024

Achievements
Preceded by Josef Kaufmann Racing	Formula Renault Eurocup Teams' Champion; 2017–2019	Succeeded by Incumbent
Preceded by Josef Kaufmann Racing	Formula Renault NEC Teams' Champion; 2017–2018	Succeeded by Incumbent
