= 2026 UAE4 Series =

Motor racing championship

The 2026 UAE4 Series was the inaugural season of the UAE4 Series, the non–FIA-certified successor of F4 Middle East Championship. It was a motor racing series for the Middle East regulated according to FIA Formula 4 regulations, and organised and promoted by the Emirates Motorsport Organization (EMSO) and Top Speed.

The season commenced on 16 January at Yas Marina Circuit and concluded on 13 February at Lusail International Circuit.

== Teams and drivers ==
Team	No.	Drivers	Class	Rounds
(Italy) Prema Racing	1	(Spain) Christian Costoya	R	All
(Italy) Prema Racing	98	(United States) Payton Westcott		1–3
(Italy) Prema Racing	99	(Romania) David Cosma Cristofor		All
(Germany) PHM Racing	4	(Austria) Emma Felbermayr		1–3
(Germany) PHM Racing	46	(Italy) Iacopo Martinese	R	All
(Germany) PHM Racing	60	(Latvia) Tomass Štolcermanis		4
(Germany) PHM Racing	97	(Kyrgyzstan) Platon Kostin (Note: Kostin is Russian, but he competes under a Kyrgyz licence as Russian national emblems were banned by the FIA following the Russian invasion of Ukraine.)		All
(United Kingdom) Hitech	5	(Qatar) Bader Al Sulaiti		All
(United Kingdom) Hitech	6	(Qatar) Nasser Al Thani	R	All
(United Kingdom) Hitech	7	(United Arab Emirates) Theo Palmer		All
(United Kingdom) Hitech	8	(Sweden) Scott Kin Lindblom		All
(India) Mumbai Falcons Racing Limited	10	(Turkey) Alp Aksoy	R	All
(India) Mumbai Falcons Racing Limited	19	(Italy) Niccolò Maccagnani		All
(India) Mumbai Falcons Racing Limited	27	(Ukraine) Oleksandr Bondarev		All
(India) Mumbai Falcons Racing Limited	69	(Italy) Kingsley Zheng (Note: Zheng is a Chinese driver competing under an Italian licence.)	R	All
(Italy) Trident	11	(Brazil) Bernardo Bernoldi	R	All
(Italy) Trident	50	(Switzerland) Florentin Hattemer	R	All
(Italy) Trident	67	(Czech Republic) Dominik Šimek	R	All
(United Arab Emirates) Yas Heat Racing	12	(United Arab Emirates) Adam Al Azhari		All
(United Arab Emirates) Yas Heat Racing	17	(United Arab Emirates) Zakaria Doleh	R	All
(United Arab Emirates) Yas Heat Racing	26	(United Arab Emirates) Edoardo Iacobucci	R	All
(United Arab Emirates) Yas Heat Racing	55	(United Arab Emirates) Charbel Abi Gebrayel	R	All
(Australia) Evans GP	14	(Denmark) Alba Hurup Larsen		1–3
(Australia) Evans GP	22	(Vietnam) Ben Anh Nguyen		1, 4
(Australia) Evans GP	40	(Netherlands) Kasper Schormans	R	2
(Australia) Evans GP	68	(Singapore) Rafael Vaessen	R	3–4
(Australia) Evans GP	88	(United Kingdom) Thomas Ingram Hill		All
(United Arab Emirates) Xcel Motorsport	15	(United Kingdom) Joseph Smith		All
(United Arab Emirates) Xcel Motorsport	23	(Australia) Brock Burton		All
(United Arab Emirates) Xcel Motorsport	54	(United Kingdom) Jarrett Clark	R	All
(United Arab Emirates) Xcel Motorsport	83	(Kuwait) Jaber Al Sabah	R	All
(United Arab Emirates) X GP	21	(United States) Cash Felber		2
(United Arab Emirates) X GP	43	(United Kingdom) Haarni Sadiq	R	4
(United Arab Emirates) X GP	73	(United States) Roman Felber		3
(United Arab Emirates) X GP	77	(United Arab Emirates) Lucas Pasquinetti	R	All
(Republic of Ireland) Pinnacle Motorsport	24	(United Kingdom) Rowan Campbell-Pilling		All
(Republic of Ireland) Pinnacle Motorsport	25	(China) Sun Anzhe	R	2, 4
(Republic of Ireland) Pinnacle Motorsport	34	(Japan) Ryusho Nakazato		All
(Republic of Ireland) Pinnacle Motorsport	74	Vladimir Verkholantsev (Note: Verkholantsev is Russian, but he competes under a neutral flag as Russian national emblems were banned by the FIA following the Russian invasion of Ukraine.)		1, 3–4
(Republic of Ireland) Pinnacle Motorsport	90	(United States) Kaylee Countryman		1–3
(France) R-ace GP	29	(United Kingdom) Kenzo Craigie	R	All
(France) R-ace GP	30	(France) Andy Consani		All
(France) R-ace GP	32	(Germany) Elia Weiss		All
(France) R-ace GP	33	(Hungary) Tamás Gender	R	All
(France) R-ace GP	42	(United Kingdom) Emily Cotty		All

Icon	Legend
R	Rookie

== Race calendar ==
The 2026 calendar was officially announced on 31 October 2025 with the FR Middle East Trophy. The adoption of the Formula 4 Trophy format saw the number of race weekends reduced to four, with the series scheduled to make only one visit to Dubai Autodrome.

Round		Circuit	Date	Pole position	Fastest lap	Winning driver	Winning team	Rookie winner	Support bill
1	R1	(United Arab Emirates) Yas Marina Circuit (Grand Prix Circuit)	17 January	(Ukraine) Oleksandr Bondarev	(France) Andy Consani	(Ukraine) Oleksandr Bondarev	(India) Mumbai Falcons Racing Limited	(Turkey) Alp Aksoy	Gulf Radical Cup; Formula Regional Middle East Trophy
1	R2	(United Arab Emirates) Yas Marina Circuit (Grand Prix Circuit)	18 January		(France) Andy Consani	(Italy) Niccolò Maccagnani	(India) Mumbai Falcons Racing Limited	(United Kingdom) Kenzo Craigie	Gulf Radical Cup; Formula Regional Middle East Trophy
1	R3	(United Arab Emirates) Yas Marina Circuit (Grand Prix Circuit)	18 January	(France) Andy Consani	(France) Andy Consani	(France) Andy Consani	(France) R-ace GP	(Spain) Christian Costoya	Gulf Radical Cup; Formula Regional Middle East Trophy
2	R1	(United Arab Emirates) Yas Marina Circuit (Corkscrew Circuit)	24 January	(Sweden) Scott Kin Lindblom	(France) Andy Consani	(Ukraine) Oleksandr Bondarev	(India) Mumbai Falcons Racing Limited	(United Kingdom) Kenzo Craigie	Formula Regional Middle East Trophy
2	R2	(United Arab Emirates) Yas Marina Circuit (Corkscrew Circuit)	25 January		(Qatar) Bader Al Sulaiti	(Qatar) Bader Al Sulaiti	(United Kingdom) Hitech	(United Kingdom) Jarrett Clark	Formula Regional Middle East Trophy
2	R3	(United Arab Emirates) Yas Marina Circuit (Corkscrew Circuit)	25 January	(Ukraine) Oleksandr Bondarev	(Ukraine) Oleksandr Bondarev	(Ukraine) Oleksandr Bondarev	(India) Mumbai Falcons Racing Limited	(United Kingdom) Kenzo Craigie	Formula Regional Middle East Trophy
3	R1	(United Arab Emirates) Dubai Autodrome	30 January–1 February	(United Kingdom) Kenzo Craigie	(Ukraine) Oleksandr Bondarev	(United Kingdom) Kenzo Craigie	(France) R-ace GP	(United Kingdom) Kenzo Craigie	Asian Le Mans Series (4H of Dubai); Formula Regional Middle East Trophy
3	R2	(United Arab Emirates) Dubai Autodrome	30 January–1 February		(Spain) Christian Costoya	(Spain) Christian Costoya	(Italy) Prema Racing	(Spain) Christian Costoya	Asian Le Mans Series (4H of Dubai); Formula Regional Middle East Trophy
3	R3	(United Arab Emirates) Dubai Autodrome	30 January–1 February	(United Kingdom) Kenzo Craigie	(Ukraine) Oleksandr Bondarev	(Ukraine) Oleksandr Bondarev	(India) Mumbai Falcons Racing Limited	(United Kingdom) Kenzo Craigie	Asian Le Mans Series (4H of Dubai); Formula Regional Middle East Trophy
4	R1	(Qatar) Lusail International Circuit	11–13 February	(France) Andy Consani	(France) Andy Consani	(France) Andy Consani	(France) R-ace GP	(Turkey) Alp Aksoy	Formula Regional Middle East Trophy
4	R2	(Qatar) Lusail International Circuit	11–13 February		(Ukraine) Oleksandr Bondarev	(Italy) Niccolò Maccagnani	(India) Mumbai Falcons Racing Limited	(Italy) Iacopo Martinese	Formula Regional Middle East Trophy
4	R3	(Qatar) Lusail International Circuit	11–13 February	(France) Andy Consani	(France) Andy Consani	(France) Andy Consani	(France) R-ace GP	(Spain) Christian Costoya	Formula Regional Middle East Trophy

== Championship standings ==
=== Scoring system ===
Points were awarded to the top ten classified drivers as follows.

Position	**1st**	**2nd**	**3rd**	**4th**	**5th**	**6th**	**7th**	**8th**	**9th**	**10th**
Points	25	18	15	12	10	8	6	4	2	1

=== Drivers' Championship ===
Pos	Driver	YMC1 (United Arab Emirates)			YMC2 (United Arab Emirates)			DUB (United Arab Emirates)			LUS (Qatar)			Pts
Pos	Driver	R1	R2	R3	R1	R2	R3	R1	R2	R3	R1	R2	R3	Pts
1	(Ukraine) Oleksandr Bondarev	**1**	6	2	1	10	**1**	2	4	1	2	7	5	191
2	(France) Andy Consani	2	7	**1**	2	35	2	3	2	3	**1**	Ret	**1**	183
3	(United Kingdom) Kenzo Craigie	7	3	6	4	9	5	**1**	7	**2**	4	8	Ret	118
4	(Italy) Niccolò Maccagnani	12	1	29	6	2	26	4	34†	5	11	1	15	98
5	(Romania) David Cosma Cristofor	3	9	15	7	4	4	5	5	4	Ret	21	2	97
6	(Spain) Christian Costoya	9	Ret	4	9	5	11	11	1	6	8	6	3	86
7	(Sweden) Scott Kin Lindblom	14	8	7	**3**	30	3	Ret	10	7	5	9	4	71
8	(Turkey) Alp Aksoy	5	5	28	8	6	8	6	Ret	9	3	10	6	70
9	(Italy) Iacopo Martinese	21	16	9	13	7	13	10	3	22	7	5	7	46
10	(United Kingdom) Emily Cotty	11	2	5	12	8	15	8	13	10	18	16	13	37
11	(United Arab Emirates) Adam Al Azhari	4	10	37	5	15	6	14	9	15	21	Ret	11	33
12	(Qatar) Bader Al Sulaiti	26	23	8	11	1	31	30	19	32	17	Ret	18	29
13	(United Kingdom) Rowan Campbell-Pilling	6	Ret	3	31	14	10	16	20	11	19	15	34†	24
14	(United Kingdom) Jarrett Clark	23	17	20	10	3	24	12	6	13	22	13	12	24
15	(United Arab Emirates) Theo Palmer	15	11	16	18	17	9	7	14	8	6	11	9	22
16	(Germany) Elia Weiss	8	12	21	34	18	Ret	Ret	31	17	10	4	8	21
17	(Latvia) Tomass Štolcermanis										9	2	Ret	20
18	(United Kingdom) Joseph Smith	28	18	26	21	25	Ret	23	DNS	12	12	3	10	16
19	(Italy) Kingsley Zheng	10	4	32	29	22	16	15	15	31†	24	18	29	13
20	(Netherlands) Kasper Schormans				17	20	7							6
21	(United States) Payton Westcott	16	Ret	22	22	21	23	9	8	20				6
22	(Denmark) Alba Hurup Larsen	13	19	10	14	29	20	13	26	14				1
23	(Kyrgyzstan) Platon Kostin	17	Ret	11	19	16	17	18	11	21	Ret	28	Ret	0
24	(Switzerland) Florentin Hattemer	25	20	13	16	11	21	20	25	16	20	20	16	0
25	(United Kingdom) Thomas Ingram Hill	19	15	12	35	Ret	14	17	12	23	DSQ	25	Ret	0
26	(Austria) Emma Felbermayr	22	24	14	15	13	12	Ret	16	33				0
27	(Czech Republic) Dominik Šimek	24	21	36	20	Ret	19	19	17	19	13	12	14	0
28	(United States) Cash Felber				24	12	18							0
29	Vladimir Verkholantsev	18	13	17				26	24	25	Ret	27	22	0
30	(Kuwait) Jaber Al Sabah	20	14	18	25	34	Ret	34†	23	34	15	14	21	0
31	(Brazil) Bernardo Bernoldi	Ret	25	23	Ret	27	22	33	22	24	14	17	17	0
32	(Hungary) Tamás Gender	35†	28	34	23	DNS	Ret	25	28	Ret	16	19	25	0
33	(United Arab Emirates) Zakaria Doleh	Ret	22	19	Ret	36	25	24	18	Ret	Ret	31	24	0
34	(United States) Roman Felber							Ret	21	18				0
35	(Singapore) Rafael Vaessen							21	Ret	DNS	29	22	19	0
36	(Japan) Ryusho Nakazato	31	30	30	27	19	29	31	29	29	26	29	31	0
37	(Pakistan) Haarni Sadiq										33	26	20	0
38	(United Arab Emirates) Charbel Abi Gebrayel	Ret	26	31	33	32	30	22	32†	DNS	23	24	26	0
39	(United Arab Emirates) Edoardo Iacobucci	27	32	27	26	23	27	27	27	26	25	23	28	0
40	(Australia) Brock Burton	30	34†	Ret	Ret	31	Ret	28	33†	27	28	32	23	0
41	(United Arab Emirates) Lucas Pasquinetti	32	29	24	36†	28	28	29	30	28	27	Ret	32	0
42	(China) Sun Anzhe				32	24	33				30	30	27	0
43	(Vietnam) Ben Anh Nguyen	29	27	25							32	33	33†	0
44	(Qatar) Nasser Al Thani	33	31	35	30	26	32	Ret	DNS	DNS	31	34	30	0
45	(United States) Kaylee Countryman	34	33†	32	28	33	34	32	35	30				0
Pos	Driver	R1	R2	R3	R1	R2	R3	R1	R2	R3	R1	R2	R3	Pts
Pos	Driver	YMC1 (United Arab Emirates)			YMC2 (United Arab Emirates)			DUB (United Arab Emirates)			LUS (Qatar)			Pts

Colour	Result
Gold	Winner
Silver	Second place
Bronze	Third place
Green	Points classification
Blue	Non-points classification
Blue	Non-classified finish (NC)
Purple	Retired, not classified (Ret)
Red	Did not qualify (DNQ)
Red	Did not pre-qualify (DNPQ)
Black	Disqualified (DSQ)
White	Did not start (DNS)
White	Withdrew (WD)
White	Race cancelled (C)
Blank	Did not practice (DNP)
Blank	Did not arrive (DNA)
Blank	Excluded (EX)

**Bold** – Pole

Italics – Fastest Lap

† – Driver did not finish the race,
but was classified as they completed
more than 75% of the race distance.

=== Rookie Cup ===
Pos	Driver	YMC1 (United Arab Emirates)			YMC2 (United Arab Emirates)			DUB (United Arab Emirates)			LUS (Qatar)			Pts
Pos	Driver	R1	R2	R3	R1	R2	R3	R1	R2	R3	R1	R2	R3	Pts
1	(United Kingdom) Kenzo Craigie	2	1	2	1	5	1	1	4	1	2	3	Ret	216
2	(Spain) Christian Costoya	3	Ret	1	3	2	4	4	1	2	4	2	1	195
3	(Turkey) Alp Aksoy	1	3	11	2	3	3	2	Ret	3	1	4	2	176
4	(Italy) Iacopo Martinese	6	5	3	5	4	5	3	2	7	3	1	3	159
5	(United Kingdom) Jarrett Clark	7	6	7	4	1	10	5	3	4	10	6	4	116
6	(Czech Republic) Dominik Simek	8	8	16	8	Ret	7	7	6	6	5	5	5	70
7	(Switzerland) Florentin Hattemer	9	7	4	6	6	8	8	9	5	9	11	6	66
8	(Italy) Kingsley Zheng	4	2	13	12	8	6	6	5	11†	12	9	16	62
9	(Kuwait) Jaber Al Sabah	5	4	5	10	15	Ret	16	13	12	7	7	10	46
10	(Brazil) Bernardo Bernoldi	Ret	10	8	Ret	12	9	15	8	8	6	8	7	33
11	(Netherlands) Kasper Schormans				7	7	2							30
12	(United Arab Emirates) Zakaria Doleh	Ret	9	6	Ret	16	11	11	7	Ret	Ret	16	11	16
13	(United Arab Emirates) Edoardo Iacobucci	10	15	10	11	9	12	13	10	9	13	13	15	7
14	(Hungary) Tamás Gender	15†	12	15	9	DNS	Ret	12	11	Ret	8	10	12	7
15	(Singapore) Rafael Vaessen							9	Ret	DNS	15	12	8	6
16	(United Arab Emirates) Lucas Pasquinetti	12	13	9	16†	13	13	14	12	10	14	Ret	18	3
17	(Pakistan) Haarni Sadiq										18	14	9	2
18	(United Arab Emirates) Charbel Abi Gebrayel	Ret	11	12	15	14	14	10	14†	DNS	11	13	13	1
19	(China) Sun Anzhe				14	10	16				16	15	14	1
20	(Qatar) Nasser Al Thani	13	14	16	13	11	15	Ret	DNS	DNS	17	17	17	0
Pos	Driver	R1	R2	R3	R1	R2	R3	R1	R2	R3	R1	R2	R3	Pts
Pos	Driver	YMC1 (United Arab Emirates)			YMC2 (United Arab Emirates)			DUB (United Arab Emirates)			LUS (Qatar)			Pts

=== Teams' Championship ===
Ahead of each event, teams nominated two drivers whose points counted towards the teams' championship.

Pos	Team	No.	YMC1 (United Arab Emirates)			YMC2 (United Arab Emirates)			DUB (United Arab Emirates)			LUS (Qatar)			Pts
Pos	Team	No.	R1	R2	R3	R1	R2	R3	R1	R2	R3	R1	R2	R3	Pts
1	(France) R-ace GP	29	7	3	6	4	9	5	1	7	2	4	8	Ret	301
1	(France) R-ace GP	30	2	7	1	2	35	2	3	2	3	1	Ret	1	301
2	(India) Mumbai Falcons Racing Limited	10	5	5	28	8	6	8	6	Ret	9	3	10	6	261
2	(India) Mumbai Falcons Racing Limited	27	1	6	2	1	10	1	2	4	1	2	7	5	261
3	(Italy) Prema Racing	1	9	Ret	4	9	5	11	11	1	6	8	6	3	183
3	(Italy) Prema Racing	99	3	9	15	7	4	4	5	5	4	Ret	21	2	183
4	(United Kingdom) Hitech	7	15	11	16	18	17	9	7	14	8	6	11	9	93
4	(United Kingdom) Hitech	8	14	8	7	3	30	3	Ret	10	7	5	9	4	93
5	(Germany) PHM Racing	4	22	24	14										64
5	(Germany) PHM Racing	46				13	7	13	10	3	22	7	5	7	64
5	(Germany) PHM Racing	60										9	2	Ret	64
5	(Germany) PHM Racing	97	17	Ret	11	19	16	17	18	11	21				64
6	(United Arab Emirates) Xcel Motorsport	15	28	18	26	21	25	Ret	23	DNS	12	12	3	10	40
6	(United Arab Emirates) Xcel Motorsport	54	23	17	20	10	3	24	12	6	13	22	13	12	40
7	(United Arab Emirates) Yas Heat Racing	12	4	10	37	5	15	6	14	9	15	21	Ret	11	33
7	(United Arab Emirates) Yas Heat Racing	17							24	18	Ret				33
7	(United Arab Emirates) Yas Heat Racing	26	27	32	27	26	23	27							33
7	(United Arab Emirates) Yas Heat Racing	55										23	24	26	33
8	(Qatar) QMMF by Hitech	5	26	23	8	11	1	31	30	19	32	17	Ret	18	29
8	(Qatar) QMMF by Hitech	6	33	31	35	30	26	32	Ret	DNS	DNS	31	34	30	29
9	(Republic of Ireland) Pinnacle Motorsport	24	6	Ret	3	31	14	10	16	20	11	19	15	34†	24
9	(Republic of Ireland) Pinnacle Motorsport	74	18	13	17				26	24	25	Ret	27	22	24
9	(Republic of Ireland) Pinnacle Motorsport	90				28	33	34							24
10	(Australia) Evans GP	14	13	19	10	14	29	20	13	26	14				7
10	(Australia) Evans GP	22	29	27	25							32	33	33†	7
10	(Australia) Evans GP	40				17	20	7							7
10	(Australia) Evans GP	88							17	12	23	DSQ	25	Ret	7
11	(Italy) Trident	11	Ret	25	23				33	22	24	14	17	17	0
11	(Italy) Trident	50				16	11	21				20	20	16	0
11	(Italy) Trident	67	24	21	36	20	Ret	19	19	17	19				0
12	(United Arab Emirates) X GP	21				24	12	18							0
12	(United Arab Emirates) X GP	43										33	26	20	0
12	(United Arab Emirates) X GP	73							Ret	21	18				0
12	(United Arab Emirates) X GP	77	32	29	24	36†	28	28	29	30	28	14	Ret	18	0
Pos	Driver	No.	R1	R2	R3	R1	R2	R3	R1	R2	R3	R1	R2	R3	Pts
Pos	Driver	No.	YMC1 (United Arab Emirates)			YMC2 (United Arab Emirates)			DUB (United Arab Emirates)			LUS (Qatar)			Pts

== See also ==
- 2025 Formula Trophy
