= Alp Aksoy =

Turkish racing driver (born 2010)

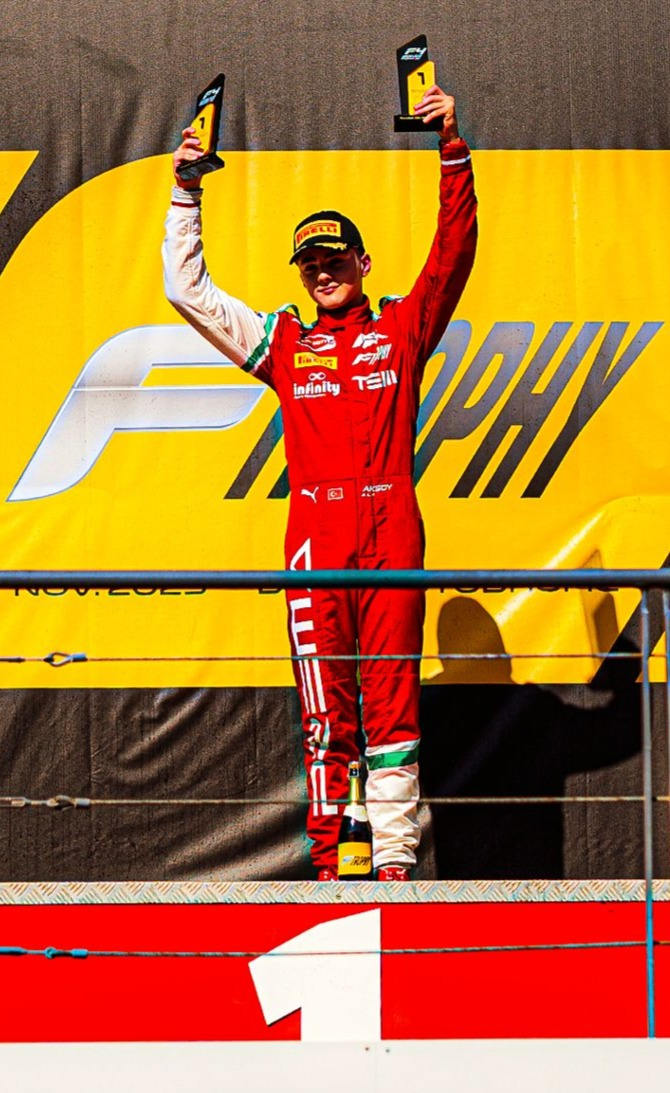
- Aksoy in 2025
- Nationality: (Turkey) Turkish
- Born: Alp Hasan Aksoy; 10 October 2010 (age 16) Istanbul, Turkey

Italian F4 Championship career
- Debut season: 2026
- Current team: Prema Racing
- Car number: 10
- Starts: 21
- Wins: 2
- Podiums: 8
- Poles: 2
- Fastest laps: 1
- Best finish: 3rd in 2026

Previous series
- 2026 2025: UAE4 Series; Formula Trophy

Championship titles
- 2025: Formula Trophy
- Statistics up to date as of 2 November 2026.

Alp Hasan Aksoy (born 10 October 2010) is a Turkish racing driver who last competed for Prema Racing in the Italian F4 Championship.

Aksoy is the 2025 Formula Trophy champion.

== Career ==
=== Karting (2016–2025) ===
Aksoy began karting competitively at the age of five, competing until 2025. Starting off by racing in Turkey and the UAE, Aksoy made his debut in European karting in 2018 by racing in Rotax Max Challenge Central Europe, in which he scored a win at the Speedworld Circuit in Austria, becoming the first Turkish driver to win in the series. The same year, Aksoy won the Turkish Winter Cup in the Mini class and finished runner-up in the main championship.

Moving to international races for 2019, Aksoy joined Baby Race Driver Academy to race in mini karts for the following three years, taking a best result of sixth in the 2021 Andrea Margutti Trophy with the team. Stepping up to junior karting for 2022, Aksoy joined Tony Kart Racing Team as a factory driver for the next season. Racing in the OK-J class, Aksoy most notably finished runner-up in the 2023 Trofeo Delle Industrie and represented Turkey in the 2022 FIA Motorsport Games Karting Sprint Junior discipline.

In 2024, Aksoy made the jump to senior karting, a year in which he drove for Parolin Motorsport and Fusion Motorsport, scoring a best result of eighth in the WSK Euro Series' standings. Remaining in the OK class for 2025, Aksoy switched Prema Racing for most of the year, before briefly returning to Fusion Motorsport for the WSK Euro Series and finishing fourth in points.

=== Formula 4 (2025–) ===
==== 2025 ====
After testing Formula 4 machinery with Prema Racing during 2025, Aksoy joined Prema-operated Mumbai Falcons Racing Limited to race in Formula Trophy. Despite winning on debut at Dubai, Aksoy was stripped of his race one win after jumping the start, but bounced back to win race three to exit the round second in points. After finishing third and eighth in the following round at Abu Dhabi, he finished second in race one and won the season finale at the same venue to secure the Formula Trophy title by 27 points over Niccolò Maccagnani.

==== 2026 ====
At the start of 2026, Aksoy returned to Mumbai Falcons to race in the UAE4 Series, scoring a best result of third in race one at Lusail en route to an eighth-place points finish. For the rest of the year, Aksoy remained with Prema Racing to compete in the Italian F4 and E4 Championships. In Italian F4, Aksoy began the season with a pair of wins at Misano and three other podiums in the first three rounds, before taking three more podiums in the second Misano round en route to third in overall points. In E4, Aksoy won at Le Castellet and finished fourth in points despite missing the finale on visa issues.

=== Formula One ===
In October 2026, Aksoy was announced as a member of the Ferrari Driver Academy.

== Karting record ==
=== Karting career summary ===
Season	Series	Team	Position
2017	Turkish Karting Championship – Mini		5th
2018	Turkish Winter Cup – Mini	DRT	1st
2018	Turkish Karting Championship – Mini		2nd
2018	Hungarian International Open – Micro Max	Uniq Racing	12th
2019	WSK Champions Cup – 60 Mini	Baby Race Driver Academy	NC
2019	WSK Super Master Series – 60 Mini	Baby Race Driver Academy	68th
2019	WSK Euro Series – 60 Mini	Baby Race Driver Academy	59th
2019	Trofeo Delle Industrie – 60 Mini	Baby Race Driver Academy	NC
2019	WSK Open Cup – 60 Mini	Baby Race Driver Academy	46th
2019	WSK Final Cup – 60 Mini	Baby Race Driver Academy	NC
2020	WSK Champions Cup – 60 Mini	Baby Race Driver Academy	15th
2020	WSK Super Master Series – 60 Mini	Baby Race Driver Academy	49th
2020	South Garda Winter Cup – Mini Rok	Baby Race Driver Academy	17th
2021	WSK Champions Cup – 60 Mini	Baby Race Driver Academy	30th
2021	WSK Super Master Series – 60 Mini	Baby Race Driver Academy	27th
2021	WSK Euro Series – 60 Mini	Baby Race Driver Academy	30th
2021	Italian Karting Championship – Mini Gr.3	Baby Race Driver Academy	21st
2021	Andrea Margutti Trophy – 60 Mini	Baby Race Driver Academy	6th
2021	Trofeo Delle Industrie – 60 Mini	Baby Race Driver Academy	22nd
2021	Coppa Italia ACI Karting – X30 Junior	Baby Race Driver Academy	7th
2022	WSK Super Master Series – OK-J	Tony Kart Racing Team	53rd
2022	Champions of the Future Winter Series – OK-J	Tony Kart Racing Team	18th
2022	Champions of the Future – OK-J	Tony Kart Racing Team	40th
2022	Karting European Championship – OK-J	Tony Kart Racing Team	34th
2022	WSK Euro Series – OK-J	Tony Kart Racing Team	40th
2022	Italian Karting Championship – OK-J	Tony Kart Racing Team	NC
2022	Karting World Championship – OK-J	Tony Kart Racing Team	NC
2022	WSK Open Cup – OK-J	Tony Kart Racing Team	22nd
2022	WSK Final Cup – OK-J	Tony Kart Racing Team	13th
2022	FIA Motorsport Games Karting Sprint Junior	Team Turkey	8th
2023	WSK Super Master Series – OK-J	Tony Kart Racing Team	17th
2023	Trofeo delle Industrie – OK-J	Tony Kart Racing Team	2nd
2023	Champions of the Future Euro Series – OK-J	Tony Kart Racing Team	27th
2023	Karting European Championship – OK-J	Tony Kart Racing Team	46th
2023	WSK Euro Series – OK-J	Tony Kart Racing Team	18th
2023	Karting World Championship – OK-J	Tony Kart Racing Team	NC
2024	WSK Champions Cup – OK	Parolin Motorsport	23rd
2024	WSK Super Master Series – OK	Parolin Motorsport	38th
2024	Champions of the Future Euro Series – OK	Parolin Motorsport; Fusion Motorsport (Note: Aksoy competed for Parolin Motorsport in rounds 1–3 and for Fusion Motorsport in rounds 4–5.)	85th
2024	Karting European Championship – OK	Parolin Motorsport; Fusion Motorsport (Note: Aksoy competed for Parolin Motorsport in rounds 1–3 and for Fusion Motorsport in round 4.)	83rd
2024	WSK Euro Series – OK	Fusion Motorsport	8th
2024	Karting World Championship – OK	Fusion Motorsport	16th
2024	WSK Final Cup – OK	Fusion Motorsport	18th
2025	WSK Super Master Series – OK	Prema Racing	15th
2025	Champions of the Future Euro Series – OK	Prema Racing	27th
2025	Karting European Championship – OK	Prema Racing	39th
2025	WSK Euro Series – OK	Fusion Motorsport	4th

== Racing record ==
=== Racing career summary ===
Season	Series	Team	Races	Wins	Poles	F/Laps	Podiums	Points	Position
2025	Formula Trophy	Mumbai Falcons Racing Limited	7	2	3	2	4	105	**1st**
2026	UAE4 Series	Mumbai Falcons Racing Limited	12	0	0	0	1	70	8th
2026	Italian F4 Championship	Prema Racing	21	2	2	1	8	352	**3rd**
2026	E4 Championship	Prema Racing	6	1	0	0	2	112	4th
2026	FIA F4 World Cup	Prema Racing	0	0	0	0	0	—N/a	WD
2027	Formula Regional European Championship							*	*

* Season still in progress.

=== Complete Formula Trophy results ===
(key) (Races in bold indicate pole position; races in italics indicate fastest lap)

Year	Team	1	2	3	4	5	6	7	DC	Points
2025	Mumbai Falcons Racing Limited	**DUB**; **1**; 6	DUB; 2; 5	**DUB**; **3**; 1	YMC1; 1; 3	YMC1; 2; 8	YMC2; 1; 2	**YMC2**; **2**; 1	1st	105

=== Complete UAE4 Series results ===
(key) (Races in bold indicate pole position; races in italics indicate fastest lap)

Year	Team	1	2	3	4	5	6	7	8	9	10	11	12	DC	Points
2026	Mumbai Falcons Racing Limited	YMC1; 1; 5	YMC1; 2; 5	YMC1; 3; 28	YMC2; 1; 8	YMC2; 2; 6	YMC2; 3; 8	DUB; 1; 6	DUB; 2 Ret	DUB; 3; 9	LUS; 1; 3	LUS; 2; 10	LUS; 3; 6	8th	70

=== Complete Italian F4 Championship results ===
(key) (Races in bold indicate pole position; races in italics indicate fastest lap)

Year	Team	1	2	3	4	5	6	7	8	9	10	11	12	13	14	15	16	17	18	19	20	21	22	23	24	25	26	27	28	DC	Points
2026	Prema Racing	**MIS1**; **1**; 1	MIS1; 2; 3	MIS1; 3	**MIS1**; **4**; 1	VLL; 1; 3	VLL; 2; 4	VLL; 3	VLL; 4; 4	MNZ; 1; 20	MNZ; 2; 3	MNZ; 3	MNZ; 4; 33†	MUG1; 1; 7	MUG1; 2	MUG1; 3; 6	MUG1; 4; 5	IMO; 1; 6	IMO; 2; 7	IMO; 3	IMO; 4; 31	MIS2; 1; 2	MIS2; 2; 3	MIS2; 3	MIS2; 4; 2	MUG2; 1; 9	MUG2; 2; 8	MUG2; 3	MUG2; 4; 8	3rd	352

=== Complete E4 Championship results ===
(key) (Races in bold indicate pole position; races in italics indicate fastest lap)

Year	Team	1	2	3	4	5	6	7	8	9	DC	Points
2026	Prema Racing	MUG; 1; 8	MUG; 2; 5	MUG; 3; 8	LEC; 1; 1	LEC; 2; 2	LEC; 3; 7	MNZ; 1 WD	MNZ; 2 WD	MNZ; 3 WD	4th	112
