= George Oscar Russell =

American speech scientist

George Oscar Russel (1890, in Conejos, Colorado – March 17, 1962) was an American speech scientist. He was a professor at the Ohio State University and published an influential book in 1928 called The Vowel: Its Physiological Mechanism as Shown by X-Ray. He was a student of Ludimar Hermann.
