= 2025 F1 Academy season =

Women's motor racing championship held in 2025

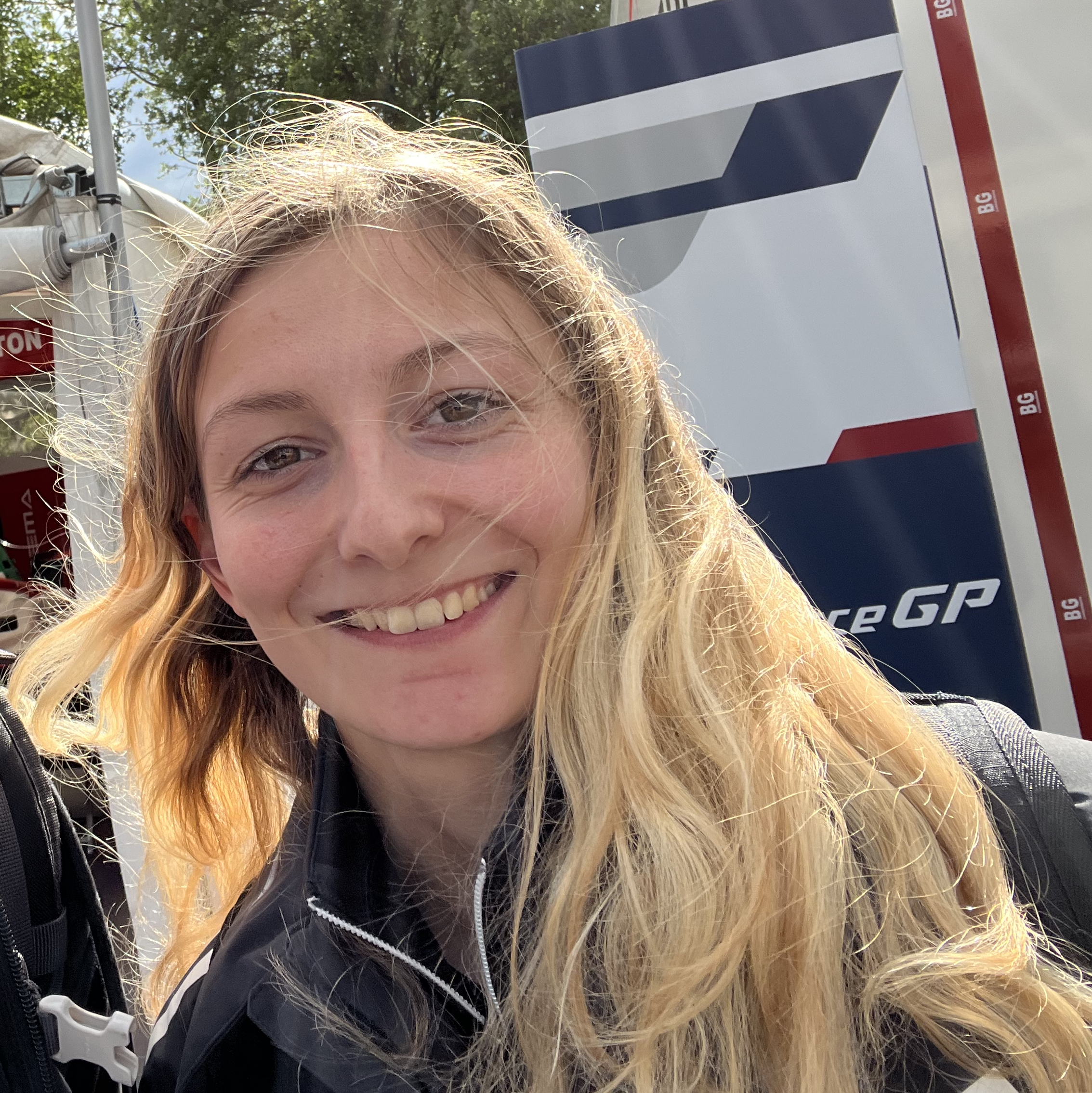
Doriane Pin won the Drivers' Championship, driving for Prema Racing.

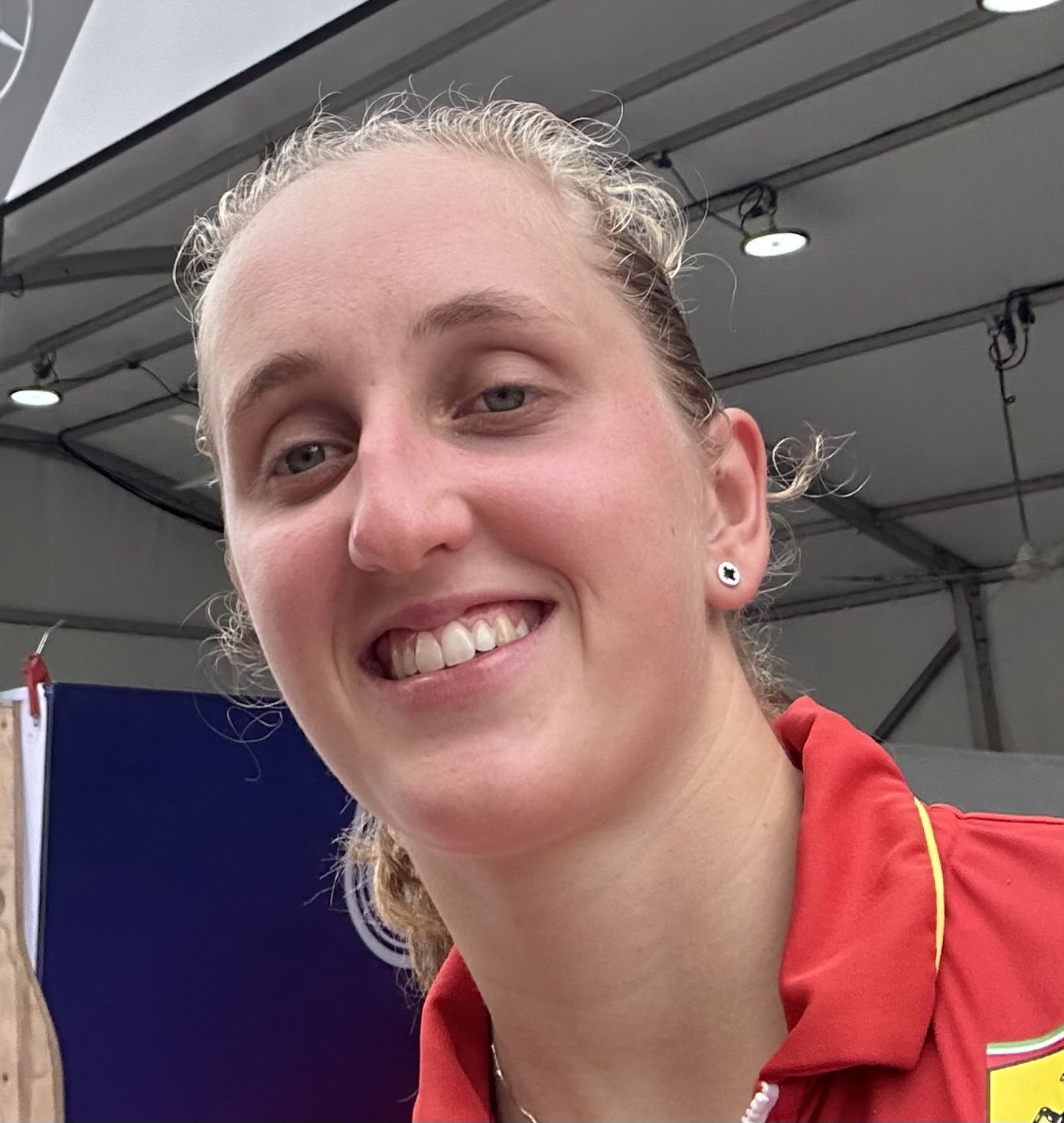
Maya Weug finished runner-up, driving for MP Motorsport.

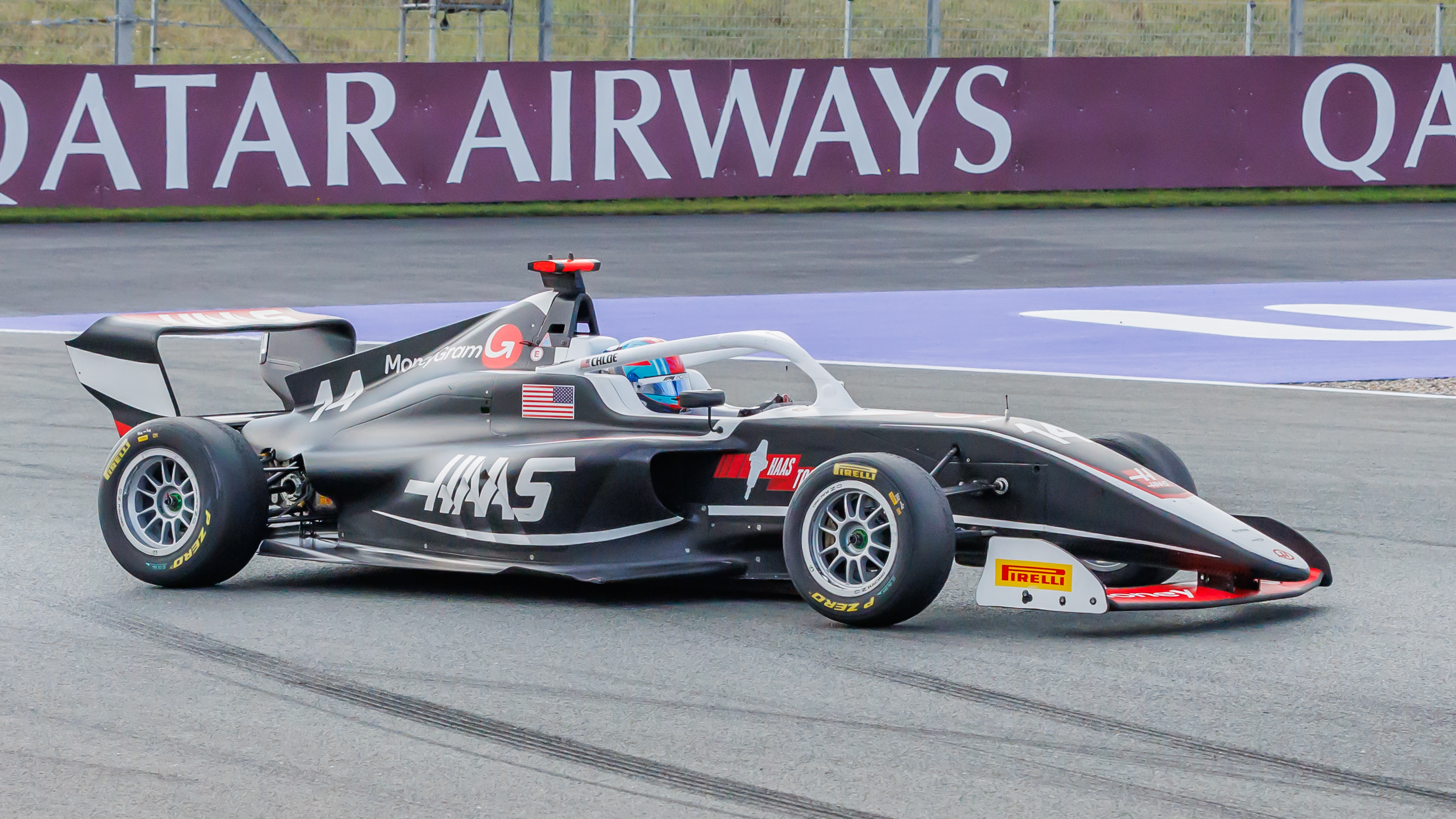
Chloe Chambers finished third in the championship, driving for Campos Racing.

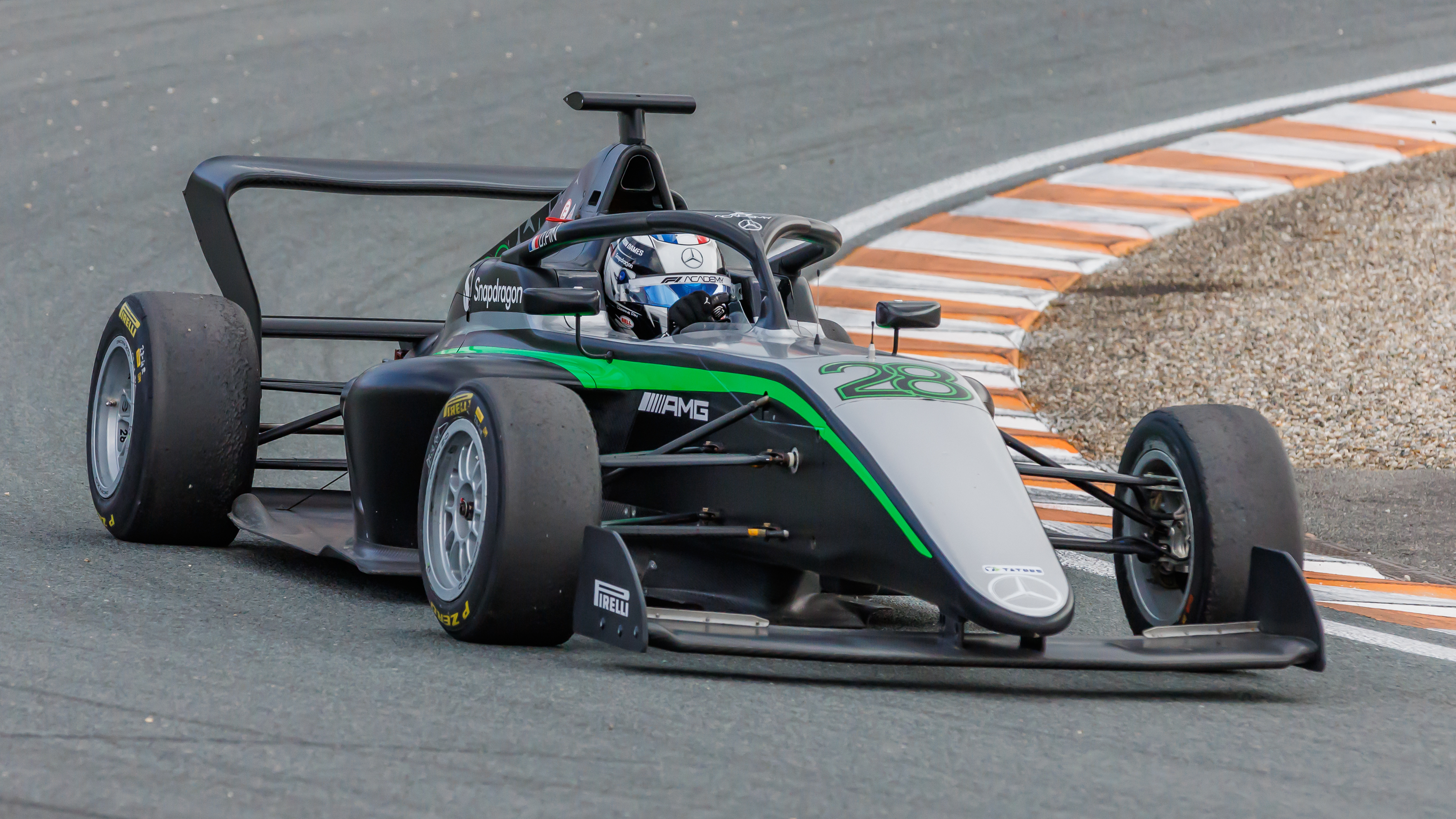
Prema Racing won their third Teams' Championship.

The 2025 F1 Academy season was the third running of F1 Academy, an all-female, Formula 4–level, open-wheel racing championship founded by and organized under the management of Formula Motorsport Limited. For the second year running, it supported selected rounds of the FIA Formula One World Championship, with 10 of the 18 cars sporting liveries sponsored by the 10 Formula One teams.

Prema Racing entered the season as the defending teams' champion after clinching the title at the final race of the 2024 season in Abu Dhabi.

For the first time in F1 Academy, the battle for the drivers' title was decided in the final race. Doriane Pin won the 2025 drivers' championship with Prema Racing, who also won the 2025 teams' championship.

== Entries ==
F1 Academy is a spec series; all teams competing with an identical Tatuus F4-T421 chassis and tyre compounds developed by Pirelli. Each car is powered by a 123-kilowatt (165 hp) turbocharged 4-cylinder engine developed by Autotecnica.

Full season entries
Teams	No.	Driver	Supporting F1 team	Rounds	Ref.
(United Kingdom) Hitech TGR	2	(Canada) Nicole Havrda	—N/a	All	
(United Kingdom) Hitech TGR	9	(United Kingdom) Megan Bruce	—N/a	6	
(United Kingdom) Hitech TGR	11	(Australia) Aiva Anagnostiadis	—N/a	1–5	
(United Kingdom) Hitech TGR	56	(United Kingdom) Rachel Robertson	—N/a	7	
(Italy) Prema Racing	3	(Netherlands) Nina Gademan	(France) Alpine	All	
(Italy) Prema Racing	28	(France) Doriane Pin	(Germany) Mercedes	All	
(Italy) Prema Racing	78	(Switzerland) Tina Hausmann	(United Kingdom) Aston Martin	All	
(New Zealand) Rodin Motorsport	5	(Austria) Emma Felbermayr	(Switzerland) Sauber	All	
(New Zealand) Rodin Motorsport	20	(United Kingdom) Ella Lloyd	(United Kingdom) McLaren	All	
(New Zealand) Rodin Motorsport	27	(United Kingdom) Chloe Chong	—N/a	All	
(France) ART Grand Prix	7	(United States) Courtney Crone	(United States) Haas	All	
(France) ART Grand Prix	22	(Brazil) Aurelia Nobels	—N/a (Note: Nobels is a Ferrari Driver Academy member, but her entry is not supported by the F1 team.)	All	
(France) ART Grand Prix	57	(United States) Lia Block	(United Kingdom) Williams	All	
(Netherlands) MP Motorsport	12	(Denmark) Alba Hurup Larsen	—N/a	All	
(Netherlands) MP Motorsport	25	(Australia) Joanne Ciconte	—N/a	All	
(Netherlands) MP Motorsport	64	(Netherlands) Maya Weug	(Italy) Ferrari	All	
(Spain) Campos Racing	14	(United States) Chloe Chambers	—N/a (Note: Chambers is a Red Bull Academy Programme member, but her entry is not supported by either of the Red Bull–owned teams.)	All	
(Spain) Campos Racing	18	(Brazil) Rafaela Ferreira	(Italy) Racing Bulls	All	
(Spain) Campos Racing	21	(United Kingdom) Alisha Palmowski	(Austria) Red Bull Racing	All	
Wildcard entries
(United Kingdom) Hitech TGR	4	(Saudi Arabia) Farah Al Yousef	—N/a	2	
(United Kingdom) Hitech TGR	8	(Germany) Mathilda Paatz	—N/a	4	
(United Kingdom) Hitech TGR	15	(United States) Payton Westcott	—N/a	7	
(United Kingdom) Hitech TGR	24	(China) Shi Wei	—N/a	1	
(United Kingdom) Hitech TGR	60	(France) Lisa Billard	—N/a	6	
(United Kingdom) Hitech TGR	86	(Netherlands) Esmee Kosterman	—N/a	5	
(United Kingdom) Hitech TGR	90	(United States) Ava Dobson	—N/a	3	

=== Team changes ===
- Hitech TGR joined the championship as the sixth team, with two full-time competitors and the third seat reserved for the wildcard drivers, relieving Prema Racing from this duty.

=== Driver changes ===
- Rodin Motorsport saw 2024 series champion Abbi Pulling leave the series as she moved to the GB3 Championship, where she continued to drive for Rodin. The team signed Singapore wildcard driver Ella Lloyd, who was backed by McLaren, and previously backed Bianca Bustamante in 2024. Austrian Emma Felbermayr made her F1 Academy racing debut with Rodin, and she drove with Sauber backing, replacing Carrie Schreiner, who was retained by the team as a Brand Ambassador. Chloe Chong returned to the series as the Charlotte Tilbury Beauty supported driver, having previously raced in the 2023 season, replacing Lola Lovinfosse.
- Campos Racing saw Nerea Martí and Carrie Schreiner leave the series. Chloe Chambers stayed with the team and switched to the Red Bull Ford car, which was previously occupied by Emely de Heus. All Red Bull supported cars switched from MP Motorsport to Campos Racing, with Qatar wildcard Alisha Palmowski replacing Hamda Al Qubaisi in the Red Bull Racing car, and F4 Brazilian driver Rafaela Ferreira replacing Amna Al Qubaisi in the Racing Bulls car.
- ART Grand Prix saw Bianca Bustamante leave the series as she moved to GB3 Championship with Elite Motorsport. They signed Miami wildcard driver Courtney Crone, who replaced Chloe Chambers as the Haas backed driver.
- Alba Hurup Larsen replaced Nerea Martí as the Tommy Hilfiger supported driver. Larsen joined MP Motorsport alongside Joanne Ciconte, who made her formula racing debut in 2024 and was supported by Wella Professionals from Round 4 onwards. Both drivers competed in their rookie F1 Academy season.
- Zandvoort wildcard driver Nina Gademan replaced Alpine junior Abbi Pulling in the Alpine supported car. She drove for Prema, taking the seat vacated by Maya Weug, as the latter switched to MP.
- Canadian driver Nicole Havrda joined Hitech, replacing Jessica Edgar as the American Express-supported driver. Alongside her, Aiva Anagnostiadis joined as the TAG Heuer supported driver.

==== In-season changes ====
- Aiva Anagnostiadis missed Rounds 6 and 7 due to a fractured left foot. Hitech replaced her with Megan Bruce in Singapore and Rachel Robertson at Las Vegas.

=== Wildcard entries ===
- Chinese driver Shi Wei was the wildcard entry for the first round in Shanghai. She previously raced in the F4 Chinese Championship, the Toyota Gazoo Racing GR86 Cup, and the China Endurance Championship.
- Saudi Arabian driver Farah Al Yousef was the wildcard entry for the second round in Jeddah. She was the 2022 Saudi Women's Karting Champion, and raced in the 2025 F4 Middle East Championship.
- American GB4 driver Ava Dobson was the wildcard entry for the third round in Miami, supported by series partner Morgan Stanley.
- German driver Mathilda Paatz was the wildcard entry for the fourth round in Montreal, supported by series partner Gatorade. She has raced in French F4 and F4 CEZ.
- Dutch driver Esmee Kosterman was the wildcard entry for the fifth round in Zandvoort, supported by series partner TeamViewer. She has raced in Indian F4 and British F4.
- French driver Lisa Billard was the wildcard entry for the sixth round in Singapore, supported by series partner Gatorade. She has competed in French F4.
- American driver Payton Westcott was the wildcard entry for the season finale at Las Vegas, supported by Visit Las Vegas. She has competed in Italian F4 and the E4 Championship.

== Calendar ==
The calendar for the 2025 season was announced on 18 November 2024. All seven rounds supported the 2025 Formula One World Championship.

Round	Circuit	Race 1	Race 2	Race 3
1	(China) Shanghai International Circuit, Shanghai	22 March	23 March	—N/a
2	(Saudi Arabia) Jeddah Corniche Circuit, Jeddah	19 April	20 April	—N/a
3	(United States) Miami International Autodrome, Miami Gardens, Florida	3 May	—N/a	—N/a
4	(Canada) Circuit Gilles Villeneuve, Montreal	14 June		15 June
5	(Netherlands) Circuit Zandvoort, Zandvoort	30 August	31 August	—N/a
6	Marina Bay Street Circuit, Singapore	4 October	5 October	—N/a
7	(United States) Las Vegas Strip Circuit, Paradise, Nevada	21 November	22 November	—N/a

=== Calendar changes ===
The Shanghai International Circuit joined the calendar, replacing the succeeding Jeddah Corniche Circuit as the season-opening venue to avoid a conflict with Ramadan. The Circuit Gilles Villeneuve and Las Vegas Strip Circuit also joined the calendar, the three respectively replacing the Circuit de Barcelona-Catalunya, Lusail International Circuit and the Yas Marina Circuit.

After race 2 for the Miami round was cancelled, a third race for the Montreal round was added.

Additionally, a first ever rookie test took place in September 2025, hosting 18 prospective drivers.

== Season summary ==
=== Round 1: Shanghai ===
The season started off at Shanghai International Circuit. After a collision between Rafaela Ferreira and Lia Block in free practice, Block was unable to compete in qualifying and Ferreira was given a 3-place grid penalty for both races. Maya Weug took pole position by nearly half a second from Doriane Pin.

During the first race, Shi Wei spun out on lap 2, while Block and Aurelia Nobels made contact on lap 5. Chloe Chong also tagged Nicole Havrda on lap 10, resulting in a 10-second penalty. Nina Gademan started on reverse-pole position and lead the race, overcoming three safety car starts caused by the aforementioned incidents. Due to an issue on the penultimate lap, she retired from the race and allowed Alisha Palmowski to take her maiden win, after starting from third on the reverse-grid. Chloe Chambers finished in second, resulting in a 1-2 finish for Campos Racing as Weug finished in third.

The second race began with two extra formation laps and a rolling start after an on-track oil spill, caused by the SRO GT Cup prior to the race. Once the race began, Pin managed to overtake pole-sitter Weug, leading by nearly three tenths before a collision between Gademan and Tina Hausmann on the first lap, resulting in a safety car being brought out and the latter being given a 10-second penalty. Nobels and Havrda also collided, forcing both to retire while Chong clipped Joanne Ciconte in trying to avoid contact. After the safety car restart, Pin led the rest of the race and ultimately won, as Weug stayed in second and Chambers finished in third. The trio left Shanghai as the championship's top three, in the order of their Race 2 finishes.

=== Round 2: Jeddah ===
At the Jeddah Corniche Circuit, Block clipped the inside wall of the final corner and red flagged the qualifying session. Chambers then took her maiden pole position being two tenths and half a second ahead of championship rivals Pin and Weug respectively.

During the first race, Ella Lloyd seized first place from her teammate Emma Felbermayr before leading the race by nearly 3 seconds ahead of Palmowski, who had overtaken Felbermayr too. Block was then tagged by Courtney Crone, and while Block was able to recover, Chong was caught in the crossfire and forced to retire, bringing out a safety car. During this safety car, Farah Al Yousef was given a 5-second penalty for a false start and Crone was given a 10-second penalty for the incident with Block, retiring afterwards. Lloyd maintained the lead over Palmowski despite the safety car restart, who was then overtaken by Weug for second place, allowing Lloyd to take her maiden win as Palmowski finished third.

Chambers held first place in the second race before coming wheel-to-wheel with Weug, who had overtaken Pin for second place. On lap 2, Ferreira tagged Felbermayr and was given a 10-second penalty and after an incident on lap 4 where she forced Weug off the track, Chambers was given a 5-second penalty. Though being given the penalty, Chambers remained first on track and began to extend her lead from the rest of the pack in an attempt to keep as many positions as possible. This resulted in a second-place finish, 5.1 seconds ahead of Pin on track, who came third, while Weug inherited first place and her first win of the season. This left Weug as the championship leader, with Pin falling down to second and Chambers staying in third place.

=== Round 3: Miami ===
The Miami International Autodrome featured another pole for Chambers, who narrowly claimed it from Palmowski, Pin and Lloyd, all separated by a mere 7 hundredths. Championship leader Weug qualified in tenth after being caught in traffic.

During the first race, reverse-polesitter Felbermayr nailed her start before Lloyd collided into the back of Ferreira, resulting in a safety car and early retirement for the latter. In the chaos, Pin was able to slip into second place and claimed first after a multi-lap battle with Felbermayr, which began at the safety car restart. After being overtaken by Pin, Felbermayr slipped down to sixth place while Palmowski and Nobels fought for second, a fight that was squandered by a safety car caused by a three-wide battle between Ciconte, Chong and Havrda that ended in the latter two making contact. After the second safety car restart, Pin pulled away from Palmowski, claiming fastest lap and the race win, with Chambers finishing in third.

Inclement weather resulted in several formation laps behind the safety car in Race 2, but after the rain worsened and multiple cars slid off the track, the red flag was drawn. ACCUS local regulations stated the circuit was in no condition for racing and Race 2 was postponed to the next round in Montreal. Weug left Miami leading the championship by a single point over Pin as Chambers maintained third.

=== Round 4: Canada ===
The Circuit Gilles Villeneuve hosted the rescheduled Miami Race 2, with starting grid already set from Miami qualifying. The two originally scheduled races in Canada were held afterwards. Montreal's qualifying session determined the grid for Race 2 (reverse-grid) and full points were awarded for Race 3. Chambers qualified in first once again, her third pole-position of the season and three tenths ahead of Palmowski, in second. Pin qualified third whilst Weug was left in fifteenth, following electrical issues.

After qualifying first in Miami, Race 1 started with Chambers on pole-position, but contact with teammate Palmowski resulted in Pin gaining the lead of the race and Lloyd claiming second. Whilst Felbermayr and Gademan fought for third, Weug's weekend got worse as her electrical issues continued and eventually caused her retirement. Two safety cars followed, with Mathilda Paatz hitting a wall and Ferreira making contact with Chong in an attempt to re-join the track. Palmowski and Ferreira were given penalties resulting in a drop from eighth to twelfth, and ninth to fourteenth, respectively. Pin claimed her third win of the season. Lloyd and Felbermayr finished second and third after the chequered flag, but Felbermayr was later disqualified from the race after her car failed to meet the weight regulations (minimum 603 kg), and Gademan was promoted to the podium.

Race 2 saw Chong take reverse-pole-position. Chong didn't hold the lead for long, as Gademan dove down the inside of her for the lead, with Lloyd and Felbermayr following suit. As Lloyd defended against Pin, Felbermayr overtook the pair and Chambers, and in an attempt to make a move on the Mercedes junior, spun-out into fourteenth. Gademan had pulled a 1.4-second gap over Felbermayr, though the latter began to close the gap. A late safety car was called for contact between Anagnostiadis and Havrda, the latter of whom was penalised for the incident and forced to start from the back of the grid for Race 3. With the grid bunched together, Felbermayr was able to overtake Gademan with a few turns to spare, claiming redemption for her previous disqualification and the race win, as teammate Lloyd finished in second, Rodin Motorsport's first 1-2 finish of the season. Gademan completed the podium in third.

The third and final race saw a Campos front row lockout, as Chambers and Palmowski started on pole and second, respectively. Palmowski was later overtaken by Lloyd for second, though contact between the pair sent the former into a spin, with Pin's front wing knocked in the commotion. Paatz then crashed into the path of Anagnostiadis causing the safety car to be brought out. Normal racing conditions started up as Felbermayr flew through the field, though Gademan made contact with her; the latter received a 10-second penalty. Weug attempted to salvage the unlucky weekend before a collision between Block and Ferreira collected Nobels, forcing another safety car to be called. The race restarted again but contact between Crone and Felbermayr saw the final return of the safety car. The 30-minute time-limit approached as the race ended. Chambers took the top step of the podium, with Lloyd and Pin standing beside her in second and third. After two races without any points and one sixth-place finish, Weug left Montreal third in the standings; Pin and Chambers jumped to first and second.

=== Round 5: Zandvoort ===
Weug claimed her second pole of the season, outqualifying Palmowski by a mere 0.039s at her home round, held at the Circuit Zandvoort, whilst championship leader Pin was left fifth behind Lloyd and Chambers.

Prema locked out the front row for Race 1, with Gademan on reverse-pole position and Hausmann alongside her. Following the race start, Chambers was pushed off into the grass by championship leader Pin, dropping to eighth place in the opening lap. A few laps after being overtaken by Block for second, Hausmann ran wide and crashed into the barriers, bringing out the safety car. At the restart, Gademan maintained her lead while Pin ran wide, allowing Lloyd to go through. Pin was forced to defend against Weug, with the latter eventually passing, also overtaking Lloyd for a podium finish. Block finished in second to achieve her first podium in the series. Gademan led the race from start to finish for her first win, becoming the seventh unique driver to achieve a race win.

Race 2 saw Chambers stuck on her grid box at the beginning of the formation lap, eventually retiring from the race due to a technical problem. This led Block to pull into Chambers' grid box before reversing back, resulting in a 10-second penalty. Dutch driver Esmee Kosterman finished in seventh and became the first wildcard entry to earn championship points since 2024. Block's penalty dropped her out of the points from eighth to twelfth, promoting Ferreira, Alba Hurup Larsen, and Chong. Weug won the race by 7.3 seconds—the second-largest winning margin in F1 Academy history. Lloyd was later given a 5-second penalty for a false start, demoting her from the podium to fourth place, promoting Palmowski and Pin to second and third, respectively. Pin left the weekend with a 20-point lead over Weug in the championship standings.

=== Round 6: Singapore ===
Maya Weug qualified in first, 0.042s ahead of Doriane Pin at the Marina Bay Street Circuit. It marked Weug's third pole of the season.

Lia Block secured her maiden F1 Academy victory in Race 1. Block defended her reverse-pole position after two safety car restarts. Nicole Havrda crashed in the opening lap of the race and was later taken to the hospital. Wildcard driver Lisa Billard sustained damage from a collision with Alba Larsen after the safety car restart in lap 3. Alisha Palmowski crashed into the barrier in lap 7, and Palmowski and Billard retired from the race, triggering the second safety car. Larsen received a 10-second time penalty for the collision with Billard. Ella Lloyd received a 5-second penalty for gaining an advantage off track in the opening lap, dropping her from fourth to seventh. Aurelia Nobels finished in fourth place. Weug finished in second and Chambers finished in third, with Block on the top step.

Weug won Race 2 under wet conditions, matching Pin for three wins each in the 2025 championship campaign. In the first lap, Pin took the lead over Weug and led for the majority of the race. A safety car was sent out after Nicole Havrda crashed in lap 11. Many teams opted for a pit stop to manage the changing wet track conditions, but championship leader Pin and her closest rival Weug stayed out. Chloe Chambers boxed under the safety car, losing out on a potential fourth-place finish and falling to 11th. Courtney Crone finished in tenth place, earning her first point of the season. Weug overtook Pin in the final lap, securing her third victory. Pin finished in second place, claiming the fastest lap, and Ella Lloyd finished in third. The gap between the two title contenders was 9 points, with Pin maintaining her lead over Weug heading into the final round at Las Vegas. Lloyd was third in the standings, ahead of Chambers.

=== Round 7: Las Vegas ===
The final round took place at the Las Vegas Strip Circuit. In qualifying, Chloe Chambers took her fourth pole position of the season, 0.380s ahead of Alisha Palmowski, making it a Campos Racing 1-2 while Alba Larsen took 3rd place, her highest qualifying position of the season. Championship contenders Doriane Pin and Maya Weug took 4th and 5th place respectively.

Pin won Race 1 under wet conditions. A rolling start was confirmed, with Nina Gademan starting on reverse-pole. Emma Felbermayr stalled on the grid during the formation lap due to a clutch issue. Maya Weug and Tina Hausmann collided on the formation lap, which deployed the safety car and prevented both drivers from starting the race. Gademan led the race after the safety car ended. Alba Larsen overtook Pin for second place in lap 4, then continued to overtake Gademan for the lead. In lap 5 Larsen collided with the wall and sustained damage, which forced her to retire. Ella Lloyd went wide in lap 6 at turn 5 and collided with the barrier, which led to another safety car and Lloyd's retirement. Gademen led after the restart in lap 8, with Pin close behind. Pin overtook Gademan for the lead in lap 9, a move that secured the Mercedes-backed driver's victory. Teammates Alisha Palmowski and Chloe Chambers battled for third place, but ultimately ended with Chambers in the barrier. The safety car was deployed again, and Chambers retired with damage. Pin took the chequered flag first, with Gademan in second and Palmowski in third. Prema won their third teams' championship in a row.

Palmowski was later disqualified from the race for breaching the sporting regulations. The Red Bull-backed driver's disqualification led to a promotion for Aurelia Nobels from fourth place to third, her first podium finish in F1 Academy. Rachel Robertson scored her first points, in fifth place, and wildcard driver Peyton Westcott also scored her first points on debut, in seventh place. Nicole Havrda received a 10-second stop and go penalty for an incident in the formation lap, which was converted to a 30-second time penalty, demoting the Canadian driver from tenth place to 12th.

Chloe Chambers converted pole to victory in Race 2. The safety car was called in lap 3, where Joanne Ciconte and wildcard driver Peyton Westcott collided and spun out at turn 5, forcing both cars to retire. Chambers led from the restart in lap 6. Pin and Weug overtook Larsen to climb up to third and fourth place respectively. Weug then overtook Pin for third place in lap 10. In the penultimate lap, Weug and Palmowski battled for second place, while Larsen overtook Pin for fourth. Chambers led every lap and won her home race, with Campos teammate Palmowski in second and title contender Weug in third.

Doriane Pin finished in fifth place and claimed the 2025 drivers' title, with Maya Weug ending the season as runner-up and Chloe Chambers finishing third overall.

=== Rookie Test ===
In February 2025, it was announced that a test would take place for drivers who had "demonstrated promising results" in karting and Formula 4-level series, potentially with a view to selecting drivers for future seasons of F1 Academy. Eighteen drivers eligible for the following season participated in the series' first-ever rookie test at Circuito de Navarra, Spain on 17–18 September.

- (France) Lisa Billard
- (France) Laura Bourguet
- (Netherlands) Annabelle Brian
- (United Kingdom) Megan Bruce
- (Sweden) Alexia Danielsson
- (Netherlands) Eva Dorrestijn
- (Canada) Autumn Fisher
- (Romania) Zoe Florescu Potolea
- (Spain) Natalia Granada
- (France) Alexandra Hervé
- (France) Jade Jacquet
- (Australia) Imogen Radburn
- (United Kingdom) Rachel Robertson
- (Poland) Michalina Sabaj
- (United States) Emma Scarbrough
- (United Kingdom) Ella Stevens
- (Bulgaria) Alexandra Vateva
- (United States) Payton Westcott

== Results and standings ==
Round		Circuit	Pole position	Fastest lap	Winning driver	Winning team
1	R1	(China) Shanghai International Circuit		(United States) Chloe Chambers	(United Kingdom) Alisha Palmowski	(Spain) Campos Racing
1	R2	(China) Shanghai International Circuit	(Netherlands) Maya Weug	(France) Doriane Pin	(France) Doriane Pin	(Italy) Prema Racing
2	R1	(Saudi Arabia) Jeddah Corniche Circuit		(France) Doriane Pin	(United Kingdom) Ella Lloyd	(New Zealand) Rodin Motorsport
2	R2	(Saudi Arabia) Jeddah Corniche Circuit	(United States) Chloe Chambers	(United States) Chloe Chambers	(Netherlands) Maya Weug	(Netherlands) MP Motorsport
3	R1	(United States) Miami International Autodrome		(France) Doriane Pin	(France) Doriane Pin	(Italy) Prema Racing
3	R2	(United States) Miami International Autodrome	Race cancelled (Note: Race 2 in Miami was cancelled due to wet conditions.)			
4	R1	(Canada) Circuit Gilles Villeneuve	(United States) Chloe Chambers (Note: Chambers qualified on pole position for the cancelled second race at Miami, which was rolled over to race one in Montreal; she received the bonus points in Miami.)	(United States) Chloe Chambers	(France) Doriane Pin	(Italy) Prema Racing
4	R2	(Canada) Circuit Gilles Villeneuve		(United States) Chloe Chambers (Note: Chloe Chambers set the fastest lap but did not finish in the top 8, so she was ineligible to score the point for it. Tina Hausmann scored the point for setting the fastest lap amongst the top 8.)	(Austria) Emma Felbermayr	(New Zealand) Rodin Motorsport
4	R3	(Canada) Circuit Gilles Villeneuve	(United States) Chloe Chambers	(France) Doriane Pin	(United States) Chloe Chambers	(Spain) Campos Racing
5	R1	(Netherlands) Circuit Zandvoort		(Netherlands) Maya Weug	(Netherlands) Nina Gademan	(Italy) Prema Racing
5	R2	(Netherlands) Circuit Zandvoort	(Netherlands) Maya Weug	(Netherlands) Maya Weug	(Netherlands) Maya Weug	(Netherlands) MP Motorsport
6	R1	(Singapore) Marina Bay Street Circuit		(France) Doriane Pin	(United States) Lia Block	(France) ART Grand Prix
6	R2	(Singapore) Marina Bay Street Circuit	(Netherlands) Maya Weug	(France) Doriane Pin	(Netherlands) Maya Weug	(Netherlands) MP Motorsport
7	R1	(United States) Las Vegas Strip Circuit		(France) Doriane Pin	(France) Doriane Pin	(Italy) Prema Racing
7	R2	(United States) Las Vegas Strip Circuit	(United States) Chloe Chambers	(United States) Chloe Chambers	(United States) Chloe Chambers	(Spain) Campos Racing

=== Qualifying ===
The fastest laps from qualifying set the grid for Race 2. The top 8 on the qualifying grid are reversed for Race 1, with the driver that qualified P8 starting from pole position. P9-P18 remains the same for each race.

=== Scoring system ===
Two points will be awarded to the driver who starts Race 2 from pole position. Fastest lap points are also handed out in each race to the driver and team who achieved the fastest valid lap time and classified inside the top 8 for race 1 and top 10 for race 2. No points are given to the driver who clocked in the fastest lap time but finished outside the points.

Race 1 points

Points will be awarded to the top eight classified finishers, including the fastest lap point.

Position	1st	2nd	3rd	4th	5th	6th	7th	8th	FL
Points	10	8	6	5	4	3	2	1	1

Race 2 points

Points will be awarded to the top ten classified finishers. Bonus points were awarded to the pole-sitter and to the driver who set the fastest lap and finished in the top ten.

Position	1st	2nd	3rd	4th	5th	6th	7th	8th	9th	10th	Pole	FL
Points	25	18	15	12	10	8	6	4	2	1	2	1

=== Drivers' championship ===
Pos.	Driver	SHA (China)		JED (Saudi Arabia)		MIA (United States)		MTL (Canada)			ZAN (Netherlands)		SIN (Singapore)		LVG (United States)		Points
Pos.	Driver	R1	R2	R1	R2	R1	R2	R1	R2	R3	R1	R2	R1	R2	R1	R2	Points
1	(France) Doriane Pin	4	1^{F}	4^{F}	3	1^{F}	C	1	4	3^{F}	6	3	5^{F}	2^{F}	1^{F}	5	172
2	(Netherlands) Maya Weug	3	2^{P}	2	1	4	C	Ret	9	6	3^{F}	1^{P}^{F}	2	1^{P}	DNS	3	157
3	(United States) Chloe Chambers	2^{F}	3	7	2^{P}^{F}	3	C	7^{P}^{F}	10	1^{P}	5	DNS	3	11	Ret	1^{P}^{F}	127
4	(United Kingdom) Ella Lloyd	6	7	1	8	Ret	C	2	2	2	4	4	7	3	Ret	6	109
5	(United Kingdom) Alisha Palmowski	1	6	3	4	2	C	12	6	7	7	2	Ret	15	DSQ	2	91
6	(Netherlands) Nina Gademan	15†	10	8	7	5	C	3	3	13	1	6	8	6	2	7	74
7	(Denmark) Alba Hurup Larsen	7	4	5	5	11	C	5	5	8	17	9	14	5	Ret	4	70
8	(Switzerland) Tina Hausmann	13	15	6	6	7	C	6	7^{F}	4	Ret	5	10	14	DNS	8	50
9	(United States) Lia Block	9	9	12	14	10	C	4	8	Ret	2	12	1	17	5	11	37
10	(Austria) Emma Felbermayr	11	5	9	15	15	C	DSQ	1	10	8	15	6	4	9	12	37
11	(United Kingdom) Chloe Chong	10	11	Ret	10	Ret	C	15†	16	5	15	10	9	7	11	15	18
12	(Brazil) Rafaela Ferreira	5	8	13	13	8	C	13†	Ret	12	11	8	Ret	9	8	9	18
13	(Brazil) Aurelia Nobels	Ret	Ret	10	11	6	C	9	13	Ret	9	14	4	12	3	10	17
14	(Australia) Joanne Ciconte	14	Ret	11	9	Ret	C	14†	15	9	14	13	11	8	10	Ret	8
15	(Netherlands) Esmee Kosterman										12	7					6
16	(United Kingdom) Rachel Robertson														4	14	5
17	(Australia) Aiva Anagnostiadis	8	13	14	17	14	C	8	14	Ret	16	17					5
18	(United States) Payton Westcott														6	Ret	3
19	(United States) Courtney Crone	12	12	Ret	12	9	C	11	12	Ret	13	11	13	10	7	13	3
20	(Canada) Nicole Havrda	Ret	Ret	15	16	12	C	10	Ret	11	10	16	Ret	Ret	12	16	1
21	(Germany) Mathilda Paatz							Ret	11	Ret							0
22	(United Kingdom) Megan Bruce												12	13			0
23	(United States) Ava Dobson					13	C										0
24	(China) Shi Wei	Ret	14														0
25	(Saudi Arabia) Farah Al Yousef			16	18												0
26	(France) Lisa Billard												Ret	16			0
Pos.	Driver	R1	R2	R1	R2	R1	R2	R1	R2	R3	R1	R2	R1	R2	R1	R2	Points
Pos.	Driver	SHA (China)		JED (Saudi Arabia)		MIA (United States)		MTL (Canada)			ZAN (Netherlands)		SIN (Singapore)		LVG (United States)		Points

Key
Colour	Result
Gold	Winner
Silver	Second place
Bronze	Third place
Green	Other points position
Blue	Other classified position
Blue	Not classified, finished (NC)
Purple	Not classified, retired (Ret)
Red	Did not qualify (DNQ)
Black	Disqualified (DSQ)
White	Did not start (DNS)
White	Race cancelled (C)
Blank	Did not practice (DNP)
Blank	Excluded (EX)
Blank	Did not arrive (DNA)
Blank	Withdrawn (WD)
Blank	Did not enter (empty cell)
Annotation	Meaning
P	Pole position
F	Fastest lap

† — Did not finish, but classified

=== Teams' championship ===
Pos.	Team	SHA (China)		JED (Saudi Arabia)		MIA (United States)		MTL (Canada)			ZAN (Netherlands)		SIN (Singapore)		LAS (United States)		Points
Pos.	Team	R1	R2	R1	R2	R1	R2	R1	R2	R3	R1	R2	R1	R2	R1	R2	Points
1	(Italy) Prema Racing	4	1^{F}	4^{F}	3	1	C	1	3	3^{F}	1	3	5^{F}	2^{F}	1^{F}	5	296
1	(Italy) Prema Racing	13	10	6	6	5	C	3	4	4	6	5	8	6	2	7	296
1	(Italy) Prema Racing	15†	15	8	7	7	C	6	7^{F}	13	Ret	6	10	14	DNS	8	296
2	(Spain) Campos Racing	1	3	3	2^{P}^{F}	2	C^{P}	7^{P}^{F}	6	1^{P}	5	2	3	9	8	1^{P}^{F}	236
2	(Spain) Campos Racing	2^{F}	6	7	4	3	C	12	10	7	7	8	Ret	11	Ret	2	236
2	(Spain) Campos Racing	5	8	13	13	8	C	13†	Ret	12	11	DNS	Ret	15	DSQ	9	236
3	(Netherlands) MP Motorsport	3	2^{P}	2	1	4	C	5	5	6	3^{F}	1^{P}^{F}	2	1^{P}	10	3	235
3	(Netherlands) MP Motorsport	7	4	5	5	11	C	14†	9	8	14	9	11	5	Ret	4	235
3	(Netherlands) MP Motorsport	14	Ret	11	9	Ret	C	Ret	15	9	17	13	14	8	DNS	Ret	235
4	(New Zealand) Rodin Motorsport	6	5	1	8	15	C	2	1	2	4	4	6	3	9	6	164
4	(New Zealand) Rodin Motorsport	10	7	9	10	Ret	C	16†	2	5	8	10	7	4	11	12	164
4	(New Zealand) Rodin Motorsport	11	11	Ret	15	Ret	C	DSQ	16	10	15	15	9	7	Ret	15	164
5	(France) ART Grand Prix	9	9	10	11	6	C	4	8	Ret	2	11	1	10	3	10	57
5	(France) ART Grand Prix	12	12	12	12	9	C	9	12	Ret	9	12	4	12	5	11	57
5	(France) ART Grand Prix	Ret	Ret	Ret	14	10	C	11	13	Ret	13	14	13	17	7	13	57
6	(United Kingdom) Hitech TGR	8	13	14	16	12	C	8	11	11	10	7	12	13	4	14	20
6	(United Kingdom) Hitech TGR	Ret	14	15	17	13	C	10	14	Ret	12	16	Ret	16	6	16	20
6	(United Kingdom) Hitech TGR	Ret	Ret	16	18	14	C	Ret	Ret	Ret	16	17	Ret	Ret	12	Ret	20
Pos.	Team	R1	R2	R1	R2	R1	R2	R1	R2	R3	R1	R2	R1	R2	R1	R2	Points
Pos.	Team	SHA (China)		JED (Saudi Arabia)		MIA (United States)		MTL (Canada)			ZAN (Netherlands)		SIN (Singapore)		LAS (United States)		Points

Key
Colour	Result
Gold	Winner
Silver	Second place
Bronze	Third place
Green	Other points position
Blue	Other classified position
Blue	Not classified, finished (NC)
Purple	Not classified, retired (Ret)
Red	Did not qualify (DNQ)
Black	Disqualified (DSQ)
White	Did not start (DNS)
White	Race cancelled (C)
Blank	Did not practice (DNP)
Blank	Excluded (EX)
Blank	Did not arrive (DNA)
Blank	Withdrawn (WD)
Blank	Did not enter (empty cell)
Annotation	Meaning
P	Pole position
F	Fastest lap

† — Did not finish, but classified
