= Aneesa Sharif Saddique =

Pakistani fashion model

Aneesa Sharif
- Born: Aneesa Sharif Saddique; 10 July 1991 (age 35); High Wycombe, Buckinghamshire, United Kingdom
- Education: The Misbourne School
- Occupation: Model
- Years active: 2012 - present
- Height: 5.7 ft (174 cm)
- Website: https://www.aneesasharif.com

Aneesa Sharif Saddique (born 10 July 1991), also known as Aneesa Sharif, is a British Pakistani model living in UK. Aneesa founded Lamour Clinic and Aesthetic Practice that offers advanced therapies and Facial Harmonisation treatment. She has worked with L'Oréal Pakistan and other brands and has been awarded ‘Best Female Model of 2016 and 2019.

== Career ==
Aneesa was born and raised in the United Kingdom. She started her career in 2014 as a make-up artist. She went to Amersham & Wycombe College, and The University of Westminster for further education. Aneesa modeled for SmashBox UK, Krylon, and Charlotte Tilbury, and MAC Cosmetics for their Asian Bridal representation. She appeared in Bridal Couture Week, Fashion Pakistan, and PFDC. In 2022, Aneesa opened the show in Switzerland for the Riwayat lifestyle London show.
