= Charlotte Tilbury =

English entrepreneur and make-up artist

Charlotte Tilbury CBE
- Born: Charlotte Emma Bow Tilbury; 10 February 1973 (age 53); Kensington, London, England
- Known for: Entrepreneur; makeup artist
- Notable work: Founder of Charlotte Tilbury Beauty
- Spouse: George Waud (m. 2014)
- Children: 2
- Website: www.charlottetilbury.com

Charlotte Emma Bow Tilbury CBE (born 10 February 1973) is an English beauty entrepreneur and makeup artist. She is the founder, president, chairman, chief creative officer of the makeup and skincare brand Charlotte Tilbury Beauty Ltd. Tilbury is a contributing beauty editor for British Vogue and a global ambassador for Women International.

== Early life ==
Tilbury was born in Kensington, west London on 10 February 1973 to artist Lance Tilbury and production manager Patsy Dodd. Her family moved to Ibiza, Spain when she was nine months old. When she was 13, Tilbury moved back to London to attend a Rudolf-Steiner boarding school in Sussex, where she started experimenting with makeup. Tilbury would give her friends makeup advice and show them which colours would look nice on them. Tilbury attended the Glauca Rossi School of Makeup.

== Career ==
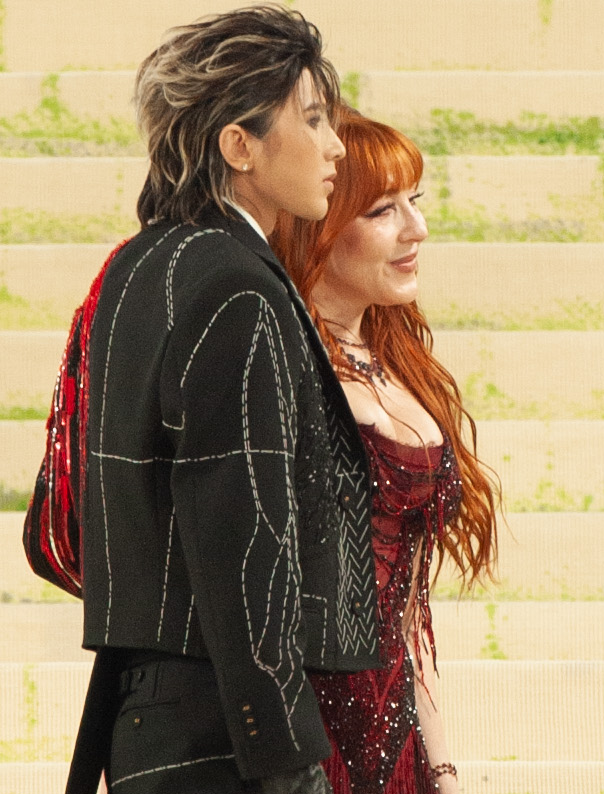
Tilbury with Cai Xukun at the 2026 Met Gala

Tilbury began her career in makeup assisting Mary Greenwell, whom she had met at age 11 in the US. She would later cite Greenwell as "an incredible mentor."

In October 2012, Tilbury launched a YouTube channel, CharlotteTilbury, and a blog, Charlotte’s Beauty Secrets. On these, she posts advice about skincare and makeup tutorials. Tilbury's work can be seen in fashion magazines like Vogue, LOVE magazine, Vanity Fair, V magazine, usually in the form of cover shoots and editorial campaigns. Tilbury has worked with photographers including Mario Testino and Mert and Marcus, and celebrities such as Kate Moss, Kim Kardashian, Gisele Bündchen and Amal Clooney. Tilbury also works for Fashion Week in New York, Milan, Paris, and London, as show makeup director for brands such as Prada, McQueen, Cavalli, Lanvin, and Chloe. The Baltimore Sun named Tilbury the "go-to makeup artist" for these events. In the past, Tilbury has collaborated with designers such as Tom Ford and Burberry on beauty campaigns, and has acted as creative director for Helena Rubinstein, amongst others.

=== Charlotte Tilbury Beauty Ltd. ===
In 2013, Tilbury launched her beauty brand, Charlotte Tilbury Beauty Ltd, at the department store Selfridges in London, with a lineup of skincare and makeup products. She formulated one of her signature products, Magic Cream, backstage during years of fashion show work. The brand enjoyed early success, as Tilbury already had a large following from her YouTube channel. The business is founded on Tilbury's "makeup wardrobe" concept, wherein individual products are marketed together as complementary looks.

In November 2015, Tilbury's flagship store opened in London's Covent Garden. Tilbury is a "hands-on" entrepreneur and personally trains all the staff at the counters and stores of the brand's products. The products are now sold internationally and can also be found at makeup retailer Sephora, and at MECCA in both Australia and New Zealand. Also in 2015, Tilbury led a limited-edition collaboration with Norman Parkinson; the packaging included photos of his selected by his grandsons.

In June 2020, Tilbury announced her partnership with Spanish fashion and fragrance company Puig. Puig acquired a majority stake in the business, with Tilbury retaining a significant minority stake, as well as continuing to be its chair, president, and chief creative officer. Tilbury is on the executive committee of Puig.

Tilbury is an ambassador of The King's Trust.

In 2024, Tilbury became the first female brand founder sponsor of the F1 Academy. Tilbury explained that she is an "adrenaline junky" and that the decision to invest in F1 stemmed from her own love of racing, which she watched with her father, and the go-carts she drove as a kid.

As of March 2025, her net worth is estimated at £350 million.

== Awards ==
Tilbury was appointed a Member of the Order of the British Empire (MBE) in the 2018 Queen's Birthday Honours List for services to the beauty and cosmetics industry. She was given the Rodial Award for Best Makeup Artist 2012, the CEW Achiever award in 2014, and was nominated for Veuve Clicquot Businesswoman of the Year for 2016. Tilbury has appeared in the Business of Fashion 500 since 2013.

Tilbury's brand has won more than 300 global awards since launch, including the Walpole award for Emerging Luxury British Brand 2014, CEW Best British Brand of the Year 2015, 2016, 2018 and 2019, Best Health & Beauty eCommerce Website of the Year 2016, Vogue Best Influencer Brand, IMAGE Most Innovative Beauty Brand and #21 in the Sunday Times Fast Track 100.

In December 2023, Tilbury received a Special Recognition Award at The Fashion Awards.

Tilbury was appointed a Commander of the Order of the British Empire (CBE) in the 2026 King's Birthday Honours for her services to the beauty and cosmetics industry.

== Lawsuits ==
In 2019, Tilbury won a lawsuit against supermarket chain Aldi, accusing them of selling a dupe of her products. That same year, actress Brooke Shields sued Tilbury for using her name without permission for one of her products, and the case was dropped later that year.

== Personal life ==
Tilbury is based between a Notting Hill townhouse and Ibiza. She married film producer George Waud in June 2014. She has two sons.
