= Megan Bruce =

British racing driver (born 2004)

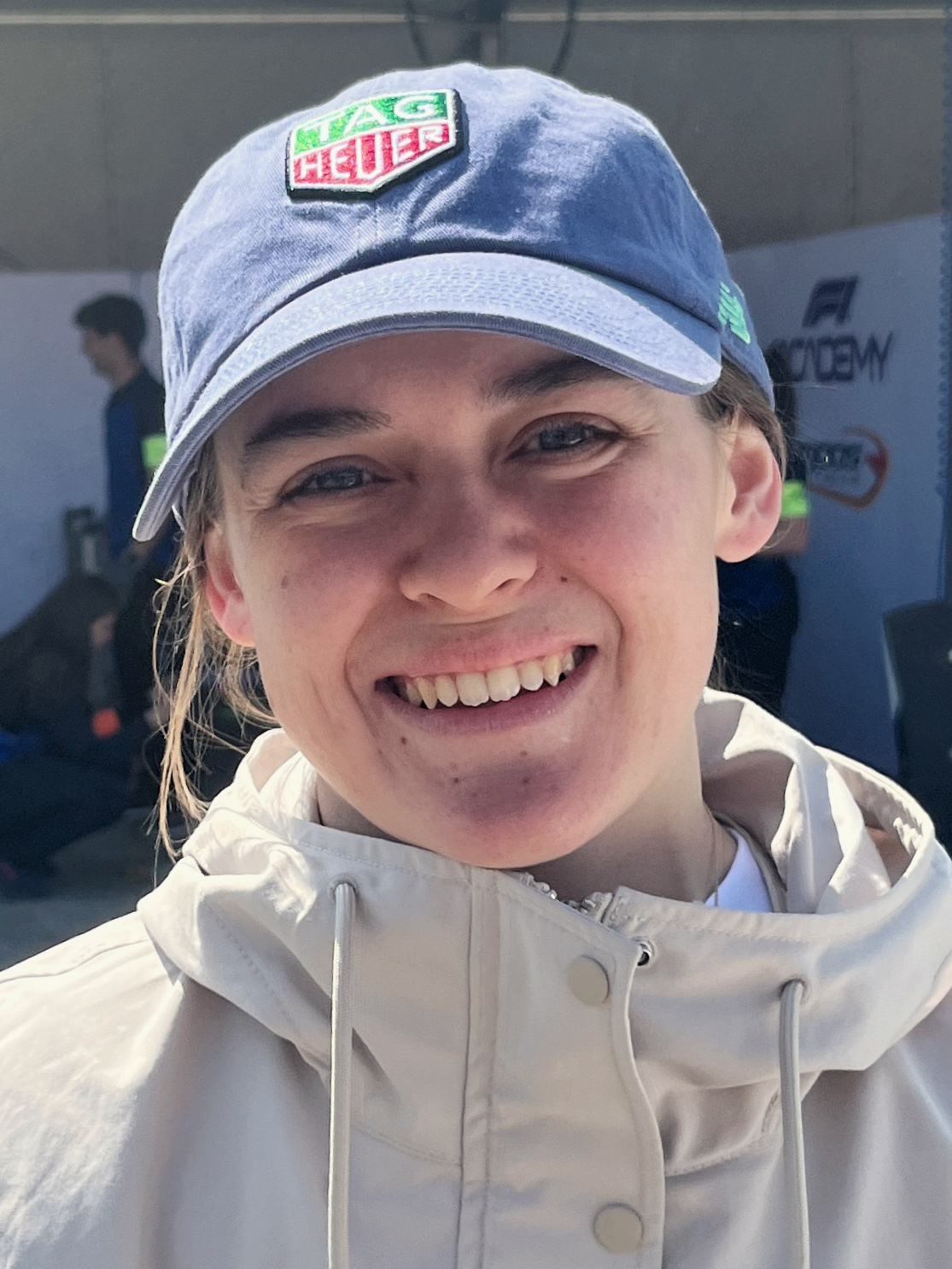
- Bruce at the 2026 Chinese Grand Prix
- Nationality: (United Kingdom) British
- Born: 2 August 2004 (age 22) West Grinstead, West Sussex, England

F1 Academy career
- Debut season: 2025
- Current team: Campos Racing
- Categorisation: FIA Silver
- Car number: 4
- Former teams: Hitech TGR
- Starts: 14
- Wins: 0
- Podiums: 2
- Poles: 0
- Fastest laps: 0
- Best finish: 22nd in 2025

Previous series
- 2025; 2024–2025; 2024–2025; 2023: F4 Saudi Arabian; Caterham 270R; GB4; Caterham Academy
- Statistics up to date as of 13 November 2026.

Megan Bruce (born 2 August 2004) is a British racing driver who competes in F1 Academy for Campos Racing with support from TAG Heuer.

Born in West Grinstead, Bruce began her career in the Caterham Academy before moving to GB4 in 2024. She debuted in F1 Academy with Hitech in 2025.

== Career ==
=== Caterham Academy and 270R championships ===
==== 2023 ====
Bruce originally karted as a hobby with her father before she began her professional racing career with Caterham Academy in 2023 finishing tenth in the Academy Championship.

==== 2024 ====
Bruce returned to one-make Caterham competition in 2024, racing in the 270R championship from Knockhill onwards. Bruce then scored two top-fives at Brands Hatch, before ending off the season with four podiums at Donington Park.

=== GB4 Championship ===
==== 2024 ====
Bruce made her single-seater debut in 2024, racing for Fox Motorsport in the GB4 Championship. In her debut round at Donington Park, Bruce scored her first top ten results by finishing ninth and seventh in races two and three. After finishing no higher than 11th at Silverstone, Bruce took her third top ten of the season at Donington Park, before taking what turned out to be her season-best result of sixth at Snetterton. Bruce then scored four top-tens in the last three rounds of the season to end the year 11th in points.

==== 2025 ====
Remaining in GB4 for 2025, Bruce switched to KMR Sport for her sophomore season in the series, as part of the Motorsport UK Academy. Starting off the season with just one top-15 finish in the first two rounds, Bruce then finished fourth in race one and ninth in race three at Oulton Park, which turned out to be her season-best results. In the following three rounds, Bruce took a best result of 11th at Brands Hatch, before leaving the series with one round left to make her F1 Academy debut. By missing the final round, Bruce finished 20th in points and was edged out to the Top Female Driver award by Ava Dobson.

=== Formula 4 ===
In late 2025, Bruce raced in the newly relaunched F4 Saudi Arabian Championship, scoring a best result of seventh in the season-ending race at Jeddah to end the year 15th in points.

=== F1 Academy ===
Bruce participated in the first-ever F1 Academy Rookie test at the Circuito de Navarra in September 2025. She finished in the top four overall during the two testing sessions. Two weeks later, Bruce joined Hitech TGR to step in for an injured Aiva Anagnostiadis for the Singapore round of the F1 Academy season. Bruce finished in twelfth in race one and thirteenth in race two.

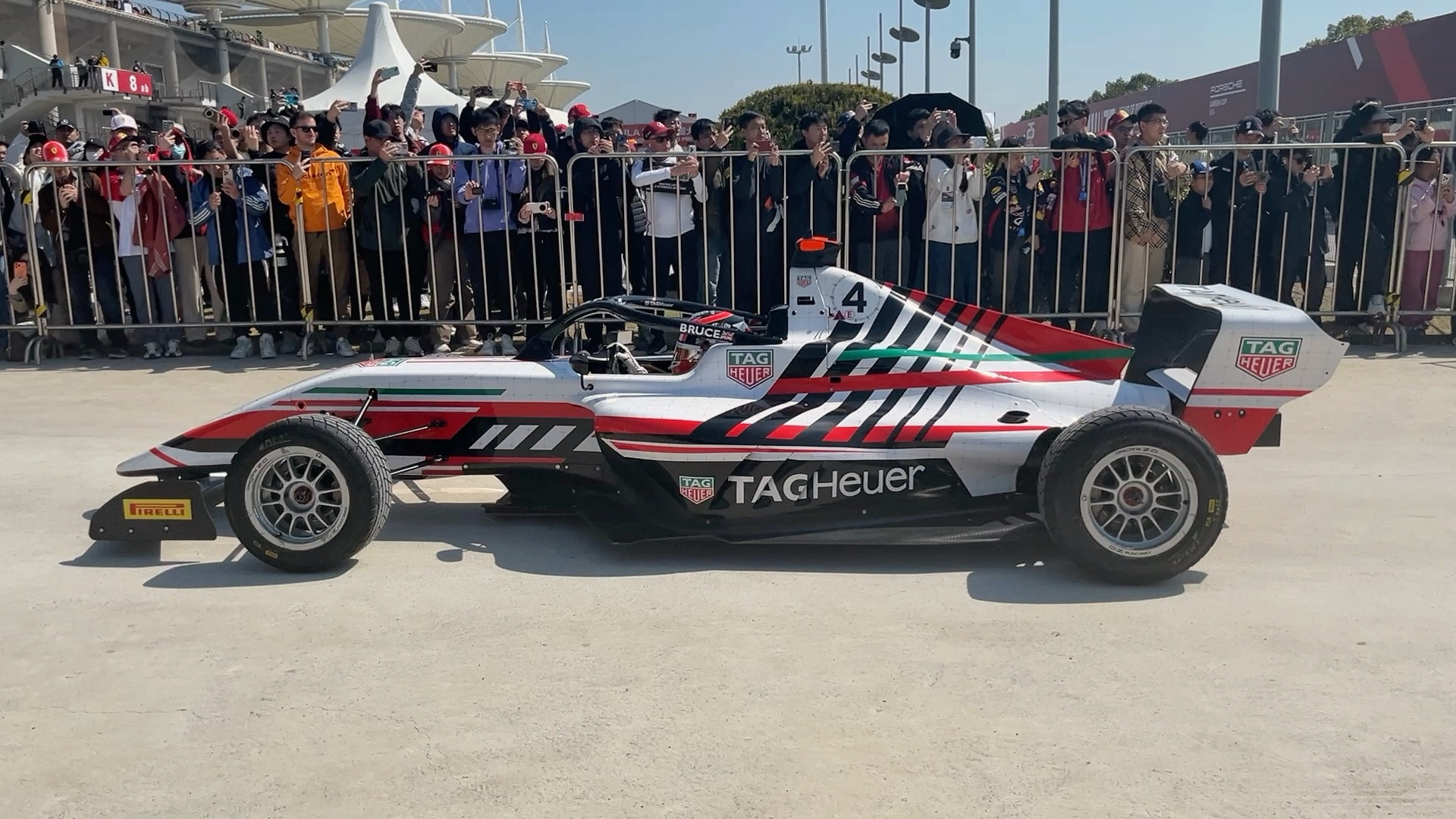
Bruce driving at the 2026 F1 Academy Shanghai round

In February 2026, Bruce was announced to compete in the 2026 season under Campos Racing with support from TAG Heuer.

== Racing record ==
=== Racing career summary ===
Season	Series	Team	Races	Wins	Poles	F/Laps	Podiums	Points	Position
2023	Caterham Academy Championship		8	0	0	0	1	108	10th
2024	Caterham 270R Championship		13	0	0	0	4	130	7th
2024	GB4 Championship	Fox Motorsport	21	0	0	0	0	183	11th
2025	Caterham 270R Championship		3	0	0	0	0	0	NC
2025	GB4 Championship	KMR Sport	17	0	0	0	0	113	20th
2025	F1 Academy	Hitech TGR	2	0	0	0	0	0	22nd
2025	F4 Saudi Arabian Championship	Caraagy	10	0	0	0	0	13	15th
2026	Formula Winter Series	Campos Racing	3	0	0	0	0	0	40th
2026	F1 Academy	Campos Racing	14	0	0	0	3	59	6th

=== Complete GB4 Championship results ===
(key) (Races in bold indicate pole position) (Races in italics indicate fastest lap)

Year	Entrant	1	2	3	4	5	6	7	8	9	10	11	12	13	14	15	16	17	18	19	20	21	22	DC	Points
2024	Fox Motorsport	OUL; 1; 11	OUL; 2; 9	OUL; 3; 7	SIL1; 1; 14	SIL1; 2; 11	SIL1; 3 C	DON1; 1; 11	DON1; 2; 10	DON1; 3; 14	SNE; 1; 10	SNE; 2; 12	SNE; 3; 6	SIL2; 1; 12	SIL2; 2; 8	SIL2; 3; 9	DON2; 1; 11	DON2; 2; 8	DON2; 3; 14	BRH; 1; 12	BRH; 2; 12	BRH; 3; 9^{3}		11th	183
2025	KMR Sport	DON; 1; 24	DON; 2; 17	DON; 3; 22	SIL1; 1; 16	SIL1; 2; 15	SIL1; 3; 16^{2}	OUL; 1; 4	OUL; 2 Ret	OUL; 3; 9^{11}	SNE; 1; 17	SNE; 2; 12	SNE; 3; 13^{5}	SIL2; 1; 16	SIL2; 2; 12	SIL2; 3; 16^{4}	BRH; 1; 13	BRH; 2; 11	BRH; 3 C	DON2; 1	DON2; 2	DON2; 3	DON2; 4	20th	113

=== Complete F1 Academy results ===
(key) (Races in bold indicate pole position) (Races in italics indicate fastest lap)

Year	Entrant	1	2	3	4	5	6	7	8	9	10	11	12	13	14	15	DC	Points
2025	Hitech TGR	SHA; 1	SHA; 2	JED; 1	JED; 2	MIA; 1	MIA; 2	MTL; 1	MTL; 2	MTL; 3	ZAN; 1	ZAN; 2	SIN; 1; 12	SIN; 2; 13	LVG; 1	LVG; 2	22nd	0
2026	Campos Racing	SHA; 1; 12	SHA; 2; 9	MTL; 1; 2	MTL; 2; 7	MTL; 3; 3	SIL; 1; 9	SIL; 2; 9	ZAN; 1; 7	ZAN; 2; 6	COA; 1; 13	COA; 2; 7	COA; 3; 10	LVG; 1	LVG; 2			

=== Complete F4 Saudi Arabian Championship results ===
(key) (Races in bold indicate pole position) (Races in italics indicate fastest lap)

Year	Team	1	2	3	4	5	6	7	8	9	10	DC	Points
2025	Caraagy	BHR1; 1; 11	BHR1; 2; 9	BHR2; 1 Ret	BHR2; 2; 11	JED1; 1; 9	JED1; 2; 11	JED2; 1; 9	JED2; 2; 13	JED3; 1; 10	JED3; 2; 7	15th	13

=== Complete Formula Winter Series results ===
(key) (Races in bold indicate pole position; races in italics indicate fastest lap)

Year	Entrant	1	2	3	4	5	6	7	8	9	10	11	12	13	14	15	DC	Points
2026	Campos Racing	EST; 1	EST; 2	EST; 3	POR; 1	POR; 2	POR; 3	CRT; 1	CRT; 2	CRT; 3	ARA; 1; 21	ARA; 2; 18	ARA; 3; 20	CAT; 1	CAT; 2	CAT; 3	40th	0
