= Ramon Monegal =

- Born: 1951 (age 74–75); Barcelona
- Occupation: Perfumer

Ramon Monegal (born 1951) is a Spanish perfumer associated with niche perfumery. A member of the fourth generation of a family with a long-standing tradition in the industry, he worked for three decades at Myrurgia and founded his own brand, Monegal, in 2009, based in Barcelona.

== Biography ==
Monegal was born in Barcelona. He has always been linked to perfumery. His great-grandfather, Esteve Monegal i Prat, opened a drugstore that later evolved into the founding of Myrurgia in 1916. Although he initially studied architecture, he began his training as a perfumer in 1972 at the family company, continuing in Geneva with Artur Jordi Pey (Firmenich), in Grasse with Marcel Carles, and in Paris with Pierre Bourdon.

For over thirty years, he worked as a fragrance creator at Myrurgia, developing colognes for brands such as Adolfo Domínguez, Antonio Miró, Don Algodón, and Massimo Dutti, among others. After Puig acquired Myrurgia in 2000, he decided to step away from the conventional industry. In 2009, he launched Monegal, his own brand.

== Bibliography ==
- Ramon Monegal, La Perfumista, Editorial Planeta, 2012, 240 p. ISBN 978-84-08-10899-3.
