= Chloe Chong =

British and Canadian racing driver (born 2007)

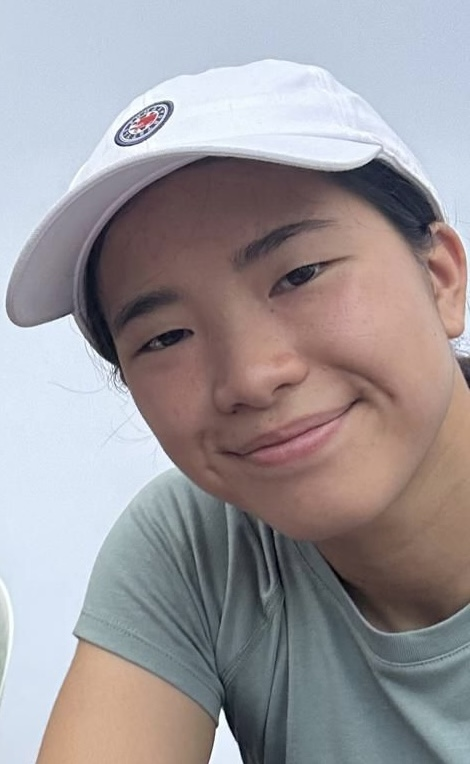
- Chong at the 2025 Singapore Grand Prix
- Nationality: (United Kingdom) British (Canada) Canadian
- Born: 27 March 2007 (age 19) Watford, Hertfordshire, England

Nürburgring Langstrecken-Serie career
- Current team: Giti Tire Motorsport by WS Racing
- Car number: 146
- Co-driver: Janina Schall, Fabienne Wohlwend
- Starts: 1
- Wins: 0
- Podiums: 1
- Poles: 0
- Fastest laps: 0
- Best finish: TBC in 2026

Previous series
- 2024–2025 2023, 2025 2023: F4 British Championship; F1 Academy; Indian Racing League

Chloe Chong (born 27 March 2007) is a British and Canadian racing driver competing in the Nürburgring Langstrecken-Serie for Giti Tire Motorsport by WS Racing alongside fellow female racing drivers Janina Schall and Fabienne Wohlwend.

Chong was the youngest driver to compete in F1 Academy in the inaugural 2023 season with Prema Racing. She returned in 2025 with Rodin Motorsport and support from Charlotte Tilbury. Chong also competed in the Indian Racing League and F4 British Championship.

== Junior career ==
=== Karting ===
Chong's karting experience started in 2013 at Buckmore Park Kart Circuit. She debuted internationally in the Rotax Max Euro Trophy and in the IAME Ladies Cup in France in 2021. In 2022, Chong was a finalist for the FIA Girls on Track - Rising Stars program, an FIA–sanctioned female talent detection program. The assessment included two days of testing in a Formula 4 car.

=== F1 Academy ===
On 15 March 2023, it was announced that Chong would compete in the 2023 season of F1 Academy for Prema Racing. She was the youngest driver in the inaugural season of the championship at the age of 16 and the only one moving from karting to open wheel racing. She finished 14th of 15 drivers, scoring 25 points across six races.

Chong returned in the 2025 season for Rodin Motorsport with support from Charlotte Tilbury. During Miami Race 1, Chong was penalized with a three-place grid drop for causing a collision. She finished the season in 11th and departed from Rodin.

=== Indian Racing League ===
In December 2023, Chong raced in two rounds of the Indian Racing League with the team Speed Demons Delhi. She scored a tenth place finish in her second race, salvaging points with top-six pace after a mistake left her two laps down.

=== British F4 ===
For the 2024 season, Chong moved to the F4 British Championship with JHR Developments. She secured a best finish of seventh place at the Donington Park, with a total of sixteen points at the end of the season. She was awarded the Pirelli Hardest Charger Award for round six at Zandvoort, after making up a total of 25 positions over the three races.

== Endurance racing ==
In October 2025, Chong tested the CLX Motorsport Ligier JS P325 LMP3 in the European Le Mans Series rookie test at the Autodromo Internacional do Algarve.

== GT racing ==
In March 2026, it was reported that Chong will enter the 2026 season of the Nürburgring Langstrecken-Serie in the VT2-RWD class for Giti Tire Motorsport by WS Racing in a BMW 228i alongside fellow female racing drivers Janina Schall and Fabienne Wohlwend.

== Personal life ==
Chong was born on 27 March 2007 in Watford, England to Canadian parents. Her mother, a Chinese immigrant to Canada, was born in Zhongshan. Chong attended the Sevenoaks School in Kent, England.

== Karting record ==
=== Karting career summary ===
| Season | Series | Team | Position | Ref |
|---|---|---|---|---|
| 2020 | Kartmasters British GP — Mini Max | Dan Holland Racing | 7th | |
| 2021 | Rotax Max Euro Trophy — Junior Max | Dan Holland Racing | 51st | |
| 2022 | British Kart Championships IAME — Junior X30 | Dan Holland Racing | 32nd | |
| 2022 | LGM Series — Junior X30 | Dan Holland Racing | 36th | |

== Racing record ==
=== Racing career summary ===
| Season | Series | Team | Races | Wins | Poles | F/Laps | Podiums | Points | Position |
|---|---|---|---|---|---|---|---|---|---|
| 2023 | F1 Academy | Prema Racing | 21 | 0 | 0 | 1 | 0 | 25 | 14th |
| 2023 | Indian Racing League | Speed Demons Delhi | 2 | 0 | 0 | 0 | 0 | 25‡ | 11th‡ |
| 2024 | F4 British Championship | JHR Developments | 30 | 0 | 0 | 0 | 0 | 16 | 24th |
| 2025 | F1 Academy | Rodin Motorsport | 14 | 0 | 0 | 0 | 0 | 18 | 11th |
| 2025 | F4 British Championship | Rodin Motorsport | 6 | 0 | 0 | 0 | 0 | 2 | 36th |
| 2026 | Nürburgring Langstrecken-Serie - VT2-RWD | Giti Tire Motorsport by WS Racing | 1 | 0 | 0 | 0 | 0 | 0 | NC |
| 2026 | Nürburgring Langstrecken-Serie - AT2 | Giti Tire Motorsport by WS Racing | 3 | 0 | 0 | 0 | 0 | 0 | NC |
| 2026 | Nürburgring Langstrecken-Serie - SP10 | Giti Tire Motorsport by WS Racing | 1 | 0 | 0 | 0 | 0 | 0 | NC |

‡ Team standings.

=== Complete F1 Academy results ===
(key) (Races in bold indicate pole position; races in italics indicate fastest lap)

| Year | Team | 1 | 2 | 3 | 4 | 5 | 6 | 7 | 8 | 9 | 10 | 11 | 12 | 13 | 14 | 15 | 16 | 17 | 18 | 19 | 20 | 21 | DC | Points |
|---|---|---|---|---|---|---|---|---|---|---|---|---|---|---|---|---|---|---|---|---|---|---|---|---|
| 2023 | Prema Racing | RBR; 1; 6 | RBR; 2; 14 | RBR; 3; 11 | CRT; 1 Ret | CRT; 2; 6 | CRT; 3; 14† | CAT; 1; 12 | CAT; 2; 15† | CAT; 3; 15 | ZAN; 1; 13 | ZAN; 2; 14 | ZAN; 3; 11 | MNZ; 1; 11 | MNZ; 2; 9 | MNZ; 3; 12† | LEC; 1; 12 | LEC; 2; 14 | LEC; 3; 10 | COA; 1; 7 | COA; 2; 6 | COA; 3; 8 | 14th | 25 |
| 2025 | Rodin Motorsport | SHA; 1; 10 | SHA; 2; 11 | JED; 1 Ret | JED; 2; 10 | MIA; 1 Ret | MIA; 2 C | MTL; 1; 15† | MTL; 2; 16 | MTL; 3; 5 | ZAN; 1; 15 | ZAN; 2; 10 | SIN; 1; 9 | SIN; 2; 7 | LVG; 1; 11 | LVG; 2; 15 | | | | | | | 11th | 18 |

^{†} Did not finish, but was classified as she had completed more than 90% of the race distance.

=== Complete F4 British Championship results ===
(key) (Races in bold indicate pole position) (Races in italics indicate fastest lap)

| Year | Team | 1 | 2 | 3 | 4 | 5 | 6 | 7 | 8 | 9 | 10 | 11 | 12 | 13 | 14 | 15 | 16 | 17 | 18 | 19 | 20 | 21 | 22 | 23 | 24 | 25 | 26 | 27 | 28 | 29 | 30 | 31 | 32 | DC | Points |
|---|---|---|---|---|---|---|---|---|---|---|---|---|---|---|---|---|---|---|---|---|---|---|---|---|---|---|---|---|---|---|---|---|---|---|---|
| 2024 | JHR Developments | DPN; 1; 21 | DPN; 2; 16^{2} | DPN; 3 C | BHI; 1; 15 | BHI; 2; 20 | BHI; 3; 15 | SNE; 1; 19 | SNE; 2; 17 | SNE; 3; 17 | THR; 1; 15 | THR; 2; 16 | THR; 3; 13 | SILGP; 1; 18 | SILGP; 2; 14^{1} | SILGP; 3; 16 | ZAN; 1; 17 | ZAN; 2; 21^{5} | ZAN; 3; 14 | KNO; 1 Ret | KNO; 2; 12^{2} | KNO; 3; 15 | DPGP; 1 Ret | DPGP; 2; 16 | DPGP; 3; 11 | DPGP; 4; 7 | SILN; 1; 15 | SILN; 2 C | SILN; 3; 12 | BHGP; 1; 16 | BHGP; 2; 17 | BHGP; 3; 19 | BHGP; 4; 17 | 24th | 16 |
| 2025 | Rodin Motorsport | DPN; 1 | DPN; 2 | DPN; 3 | SILGP; 1 | SILGP; 2 | SILGP; 3 | SNE; 1; 10 | SNE; 2; 13^{1} | SNE; 3; 14 | THR; 1 | THR; 2 | THR; 3 | OUL; 1 | OUL; 2 | OUL; 3 | SILGP; 1 | SILGP; 2 | ZAN; 1 Ret | ZAN; 2 Ret | ZAN; 3; 20 | KNO; 1 | KNO; 2 | KNO; 3 | DPGP; 1 | DPGP; 2 | DPGP; 3 | SILN; 1 | SILN; 2 | SILN; 3 | BHGP; 1 | BHGP; 2 | BHGP; 3 | 36th | 2 |
