= Esmee Kosterman =

Dutch racing driver (born 2005)

- Kosterman at the 2026 Dutch Grand Prix
- Nationality: (Netherlands) Dutch
- Born: 16 April 2005 (age 21) Wijk bij Duurstede, Netherlands

F1 Academy career
- Debut season: 2025
- Current team: MP Motorsport
- Car number: 32
- Former teams: Hitech TGR
- Starts: 14
- Wins: 0
- Podiums: 0
- Poles: 0
- Fastest laps: 1
- Best finish: 15th in 2025

Previous series
- 2025; 2025; 2024; 2024; 2022; 2021–2023: F4 British; F4 Saudi Arabian; Lamera Cup; F4 Indian; Prototype Challenge; Ford Fiesta Sprint Cup Benelux
- Statistics up to date as of 13 November 2026.

Esmee Kosterman (born 16 April 2005) is a Dutch racing driver who competes in F1 Academy for MP Motorsport with support from Lego.

== Career ==
Born in Wijk bij Duurstede, Kosterman began karting at the age of nine. In her karting career, she finished runner-up in the 2017 Dutch Karting Championship, represented the Netherlands in the 2018 Karting Academy Trophy, and was part of the inaugural FIA Girls on Track – Rising Stars shootout in 2020.

Stepping up to cars in 2021, Kosterman joined NXT Racing to compete in the Ford Fiesta Sprint Cup as a KNAF Talent Junior, finishing 17th in points at season's end and was retained as a KNAF Talent Junior for the following year. Kosterman remained in the Ford Fiesta Sprint Cup for 2022, switching to V-Max for her sophomore season. During 2022, Kosterman also raced in the Radical class of the Prototype Challenge and was retained as a KNAF Talent Junior at the end of the year.

In 2023, Kosterman joined Bas Koeten Racing to return the Ford Fiesta Sprint Cup Netherlands, taking a lone win at Assen on her way to runner-up in junior standings and third in overall points. The following year, Kosterman competed in the Lamera Cup and was the highest-placed female at season's end. At the end of the year, Kosterman made a one-off appearance in the F4 Indian Championship, taking a best result of ninth in race one.

Remaining in single-seaters for 2025, Kosterman joined JHR Developments on a part-time basis to race in the F4 British Championship. Finishing 11th on debut at Silverstone, before taking a best result of 13th at Snetterton and taking her maiden points by overtaking four cars in race two. (Note: In the F4 British Championship, extra points are awarded in race two, with a maximum of ten, for positions gained from the drivers' respective starting positions.) Returning to the team for the British Grand Prix-supporting non-championship round at Silverstone, Kosterman finished 20th and 17th in both races. Kosterman remained with the team for her home round at Zandvoort, in which she took a best result of 17th in round one in what turned out to be her final appearance of the season. Kosterman also competed in all but one rounds of the relaunched F4 Saudi Arabian Championship, in which she scored a best result of sixth twice in the first two Jeddah rounds, en route to a 10th-place points finish and second in the Female Trophy.

=== F1 Academy ===
Kosterman made a wildcard appearance in the 2025 season of F1 Academy at Zandvoort racing for Hitech TGR with support from TeamViewer. Qualifying ninth on debut, Kosterman finished 12th in race one after starting from the pits, before taking her maiden points by finishing seventh in race two. She was later confirmed for the full season in 2026 with MP Motorsport in a LEGO-liveried car.

== Karting record ==
=== Karting career summary ===
Season	Series	Team	Position
2018	Karting Academy Trophy	Kosterman, Peter	44th

== Racing record ==
=== Racing career summary ===
Season	Series	Team	Races	Wins	Poles	F/Laps	Podiums	Points	Position
2021	Ford Fiesta Sprint Cup Benelux	NXT Racing	12	0	0	0	3	156	17th
2022	Ford Fiesta Sprint Cup Benelux	MV Motorsport	4	0	0	0	1	123	19th
2022	Prototype Challenge – Radical	MV Motorsport	2	1	0	2	2	40	5th
2023	Ford Fiesta Sprint Cup Benelux	Bas Koeten Racing	14	1	0	0	5	194	**3rd**
2024	Lamera Cup – Elite	Lensdeal	6	1	0	0	2	656	18th
2024	F4 Indian Championship	Rarh Bengal Tigers	4	0	0	0	0	3	24th
2025	F4 British Championship	JHR Developments	9	0	0	0	0	4	34th
2025	F1 Academy	Hitech TGR	2	0	0	0	0	6	15th
2025	F4 Saudi Arabian Championship	My-Car	10	0	0	0	0	43	10th
2026	F1 Academy	MP Motorsport	14	0	0	1	0	12	17th

=== Complete F4 Indian Championship results ===
(key) (Races in bold indicate pole position) (Races in italics indicate fastest lap)

Year	Entrant	1	2	3	4	5	6	7	8	9	10	11	12	13	14	15	Pos	Points
2024	Rarh Bengal Tigers	MAD1; 1	MAD1; 2	MAD1; 3	CHE; 1	CHE; 2	MAD2; 1; 9	MAD2; 2; 10	MAD2; 3; 11	MAD2; 4; 11	KAR1; 1	KAR1; 2	KAR1; 3	KAR2; 1	KAR2; 2	KAR2; 3	24th	3

=== Complete F4 British Championship results ===
(key) (Races in bold indicate pole position) (Races in italics indicate fastest lap)

Year	Team	1	2	3	4	5	6	7	8	9	10	11	12	13	14	15	16	17	18	19	20	21	22	23	24	25	26	27	28	29	30	31	32	DC	Points
2025	JHR Developments	DPN; 1	DPN; 2	DPN; 3	SILGP; 1; 11	SILGP; 2; 19	SILGP; 3; 18	SNE; 1; 13	SNE; 2; 18^{4}	SNE; 3 Ret	THR; 1	THR; 2	THR; 3	OUL; 1	OUL; 2	OUL; 3	SILGP; 1; 20	SILGP; 2; 17	ZAN; 1; 17	ZAN; 2 Ret	ZAN; 3; 21	KNO; 1	KNO; 2	KNO; 3	DPGP; 1	DPGP; 2	DPGP; 3	SILN; 1	SILN; 2	SILN; 3	BHGP; 1	BHGP; 2	BHGP; 3	34th	4

=== Complete F1 Academy results ===
(key) (Races in bold indicate pole position) (Races in italics indicate fastest lap)

Year	Entrant	1	2	3	4	5	6	7	8	9	10	11	12	13	14	15	DC	Points
2025	Hitech TGR	SHA; 1	SHA; 2	JED; 1	JED; 2	MIA; 1	MIA; 2	MTL; 1	MTL; 2	MTL; 3	ZAN; 1; 12	ZAN; 2; 7	SIN; 1	SIN; 2	LVG; 1	LVG; 2	15th	6
2026	MP Motorsport	SHA; 1; 15	SHA; 2 Ret	MTL; 1; 18	MTL; 2; 9	MTL; 3; 12	SIL; 1; 12	SIL; 2; 15	ZAN; 1; 4	ZAN; 2; 10	COA; 1; 8	COA; 2; 11	COA; 3; 9	LVG; 1	LVG; 2			

=== Complete F4 Saudi Arabian Championship results ===
(key) (Races in bold indicate pole position) (Races in italics indicate fastest lap)

Year	Team	1	2	3	4	5	6	7	8	9	10	DC	Points
2025	My-Car	BHR1; 1	BHR1; 2	BHR2; 1; 9	BHR2; 2; 8	JED1; 1; 6	JED1; 2; 7	JED2; 1; 6	JED2; 2; 7	JED3; 1; 6	JED3; 2; 10	10th	43
