= Heno de Pravia =

Spanish soap brand

- Product type: Hygiene; personal care
- Current owner: Puig
- Country: Spain
- Introduced: 1905; 121 years ago
- Markets: Worldwide
- Previous owners: Perfumería Gal

Heno de Pravia (lit. 'Hay of Pravia') is a Spanish brand of personal hygiene and personal care products that originally referred only to a natural bath soap coloured moss green known as Heno de Pravia Original Jabón Natural (lit. 'Heno de Pravia Original Bath Soap').

The Heno de Pravia soap is noted for its aroma mimicking the scent of freshly-cut hay, ostensibly inspired by its creator's visit to the town of Pravia in the late 1880s. It was finally made and first sold in Spain in 1905 and already included the oils from geranium, lavender, and sandalwood that have remained to this day as the creation's signature ingredients.

Heno de Pravia's later line of skin cleansers and other personal hygiene and care products, such as its body lotion, powder, cologne, cream soaps, and fragrances, also contain the original soap's signature organic oils. Purportedly made entirely of natural raw materials, the brand's products—including the moisturizing version of the Heno de Pravia soap that is 80% palm oil—supposedly contain neither chemicals nor bleaching ingredients. Manufactured originally by Perfumería Gal, it is currently linked to the Spanish fashion and perfume company Puig.

== History ==
In 1903, Salvador Echeandía Gal, co-founder of Perfumería Gal with Lesmes Sainz de Vicuña Arrascaeta, Gal's countryman from Irún, Guipúzcoa, was on a trip in Asturias when he passed through the town of Pravia, where he was captivated by an aroma that came from the freshly-cut hay in the town. From that moment he became obsessed with the idea of creating a perfume with that smell, and in 1905 he was able to produce and put on sale a soap with that fragrance, which he called Heno de Pravia in memory of the town where he got the idea. In 1911, Perfumería Gal registered Heno de Pravia as a trademark for its bar of toilet soap, which had already been in circulation for a year. The soap came in the form of a hay-green bar, wrapped in yellow paper alluding to dry hay.

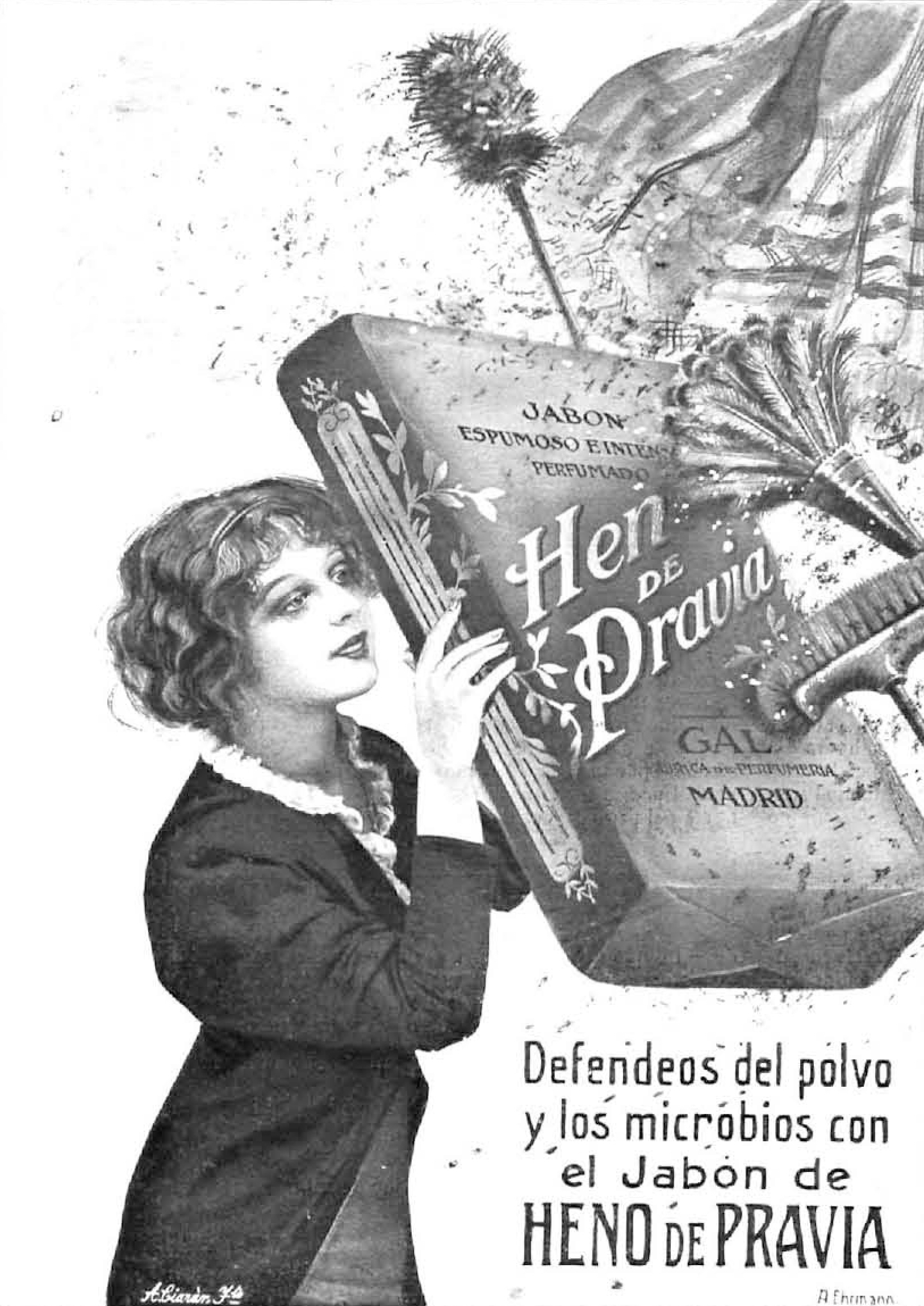
Advertisement for Heno de Pravia in La Ilustración Española y Americana (1913).

The soap was a success, also due to the fact that Perfumeria Gal was the first Spanish company to create an advertising department. The company hired the best publicists and illustrators of the early twentieth century, such as A. Ehrmann, who was responsible for the brand's drawings in the 1910s, Alfons Mucha, Federico Ribas, and Pedro Prat Caballí, who created advertising with a style close to Art Deco. Actresses of the time, such as Margarita Xirgu, María Guerrero, and María Fernanda Ladrón de Guevara, endorsed the soap in the brand's advertisements. The latter declared on a June 1916 cover of the magazine Nuevo Mundo: "I wash with Heno de Pravia soap, because it is the most beneficial for the skin and the most perfumed." In the 1950s, the company began to hire radio spots, using catchy music and advertising jingles. In the 1970s it started advertising on television and began to market family and unisex colognes. Despite more than a century of existence, the brand has retained its success in the Spanish market and has grown in the international market, currently including a range of hygiene products (bar soaps, body lotion, baby powder, cream soaps, gels, deodorants, family colognes and packaged colognes).

In 2004, Perfumería Gal and all of its brands were absorbed by the Puig group.

In 2011, the Spanish subsidiary of the home and personal care products company Reckitt Benckiser collaborated with Puig for the launch of "Flor Heno de Pravia", a new fragrance for the Flor fabric softener that Reckitt markets to Spanish and Portuguese consumers.

In 2016, the brand celebrated its 110th anniversary by launching a limited edition of its eau de cologne, the packaging of which included a label signed by Federico Ribas. Ribas was the illustrator who became the brand's artistic director for four decades after winning Perfumeria Gal's advertising poster competition in 1916; Ribas bested entrants that included Santiago Rusiñol, José Segrelles, and Robert Martínez Baldrich.

== Ingredients ==
In 2023, in an interview by Radio Fórmula, the Mexican government's Office of the Federal Prosecutor for the Consumer (PROFECO) mentioned Heno de Pravia as one of several bath soaps that "claim to be natural" but are not.

Incidecoder.com llsts the brand's soap as containing sodium tallowate, sodium cocoate, water, glycerin, fragrance, citric acid, sodium chloride, tetrasodium EDTA, cinnamyl alcohol, citronellol, coumarin, eugenol, geraniol, linalool, Ci 12490 (Pigment Red 5), Ci 21108, Ci 74260 (Pigment Green 7), and Ci 77891 (Titanium Dioxide).

Incibeauty.com, meanwhile, also listed ammonium acrylates copolymer, BHT, butylene glycol, Ci 77492 (Iron oxides), Ci 77007 (Ultramarines), etidronic acid, limonene, methylpropanediol, and sodium palm kernelate, as well as acacia Senegal gum, caprylyl glycol, phenylpropanol, and xantham gum.

== Advertising ==
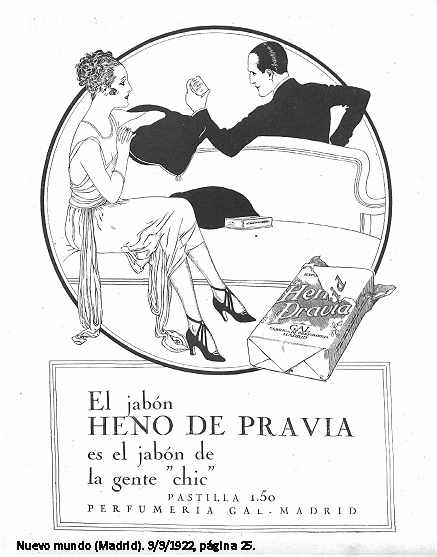
A 1922 advertisement for the soap in Nuevo Mundo magazine.

During its first decade, Perfumeria Gal became the first Spanish company to build an advertising department. The department hired the best illustrators of the early twentieth century, such as A. Ehrmann, who was responsible for the brand's drawings in the 1910s, as well as Alfons Mucha, Federico Ribas, and Pedro Prat Caballí, who created advertising with a style close to Art Deco. The department also hired actresses from the period, including Margarita Xirgu, María Guerrero, and María Fernanda Ladrón de Guevara, to endorse the soap in its advertisements. On a June 1916 cover of the magazine Nuevo Mundo, the picture with Ladrón de Guevara had the caption quote, "I wash with Heno de Pravia soap because it is the most beneficial for the skin and the most perfumed."

Starting in the 1950s, the company began to hire radio spots, using catchy music and advertising jingles. One of its later jingles featured Mercedes Valimaña, a member of Trío La La La.

In the 1970s, Heno de Pravia started advertising on television at the same time that it started to market family and unisex colognes. Then, in 1974, during a time when Heno de Pravia found itself competing with more modern and sophisticated brands, it launched the television commercial titled "The aroma of my home", which revived interest in the soap. Positioning the brand as the "scent of the childhood home", the advertisement freed the brand from the perception that it was old-fashioned, strengthening older consumers' loyalty to it while generating the younger generations' interest in the image it promoted.

== Reviews ==
In a 2023 interview with Colombian news magazine Semana, Spanish TV presenter Mariló Montero mentioned the soap as part of her daily facial routine. English TV presenter Ruth Langsford, meanwhile, endorsed Heno de Pravia's cologne in a May 2025 Instagram post, saying she sprays it on her linens.
