= Puig (company) =

Spanish fashion and fragrance company

Puig Brands, S.A.
- Type: Public
- Traded as: BMAD: PUIG; IBEX 35
- Industry: Fashion and fragrance
- Founded: 1914; 112 years ago
- Founder: Antonio Puig
- Headquarters: Barcelona, Spain
- Area served: Worldwide
- Key people: Marc Puig (CEO)
- Products: Clothing; Accessories; Perfumes; Cosmetics
- Revenue: ▲€4.3 billion (2023)
- Net income: ▲€465 million (2023)
- Number of employees: 11,124 (2023)
- Subsidiaries: Nina Ricci; Carolina Herrera; Rabanne; Dries Van Noten; Jean Paul Gaultier; L'Artisan Parfumeur; Penhaligon's; ISDIN; Uriage; Apivita; Dr. Barbara Sturm; Charlotte Tilbury Beauty; Byredo; Unive
- Website: Official website

Puig Brands, S.A. (commonly Puig; Catalan pronunciation: [ˈputʃ]) is a Spanish premium beauty company founded in 1914 by Antonio Puig Castelló in Barcelona, Catalonia, Spain. The company remains under the management of the Puig family.

Puig markets its products in 150 countries and has a direct presence in 32, employing 12,116 people worldwide.

Puig operates in the fashion, fragrances, makeup and skincare business segments, and owns brands such as Rabanne, Carolina Herrera, Charlotte Tilbury, Jean Paul Gaultier, Dries Van Noten, and Nina Ricci. As well as L'Artisan Parfumeur, Penhaligon's, Byredo, Kama Ayurveda, Loto del Sur, Dr. Barbara Sturm, Uriage and Apivita. Additionally, it holds licenses for Christian Louboutin, Adolfo Dominguez, Antonio Banderas and Shakira.

== History ==
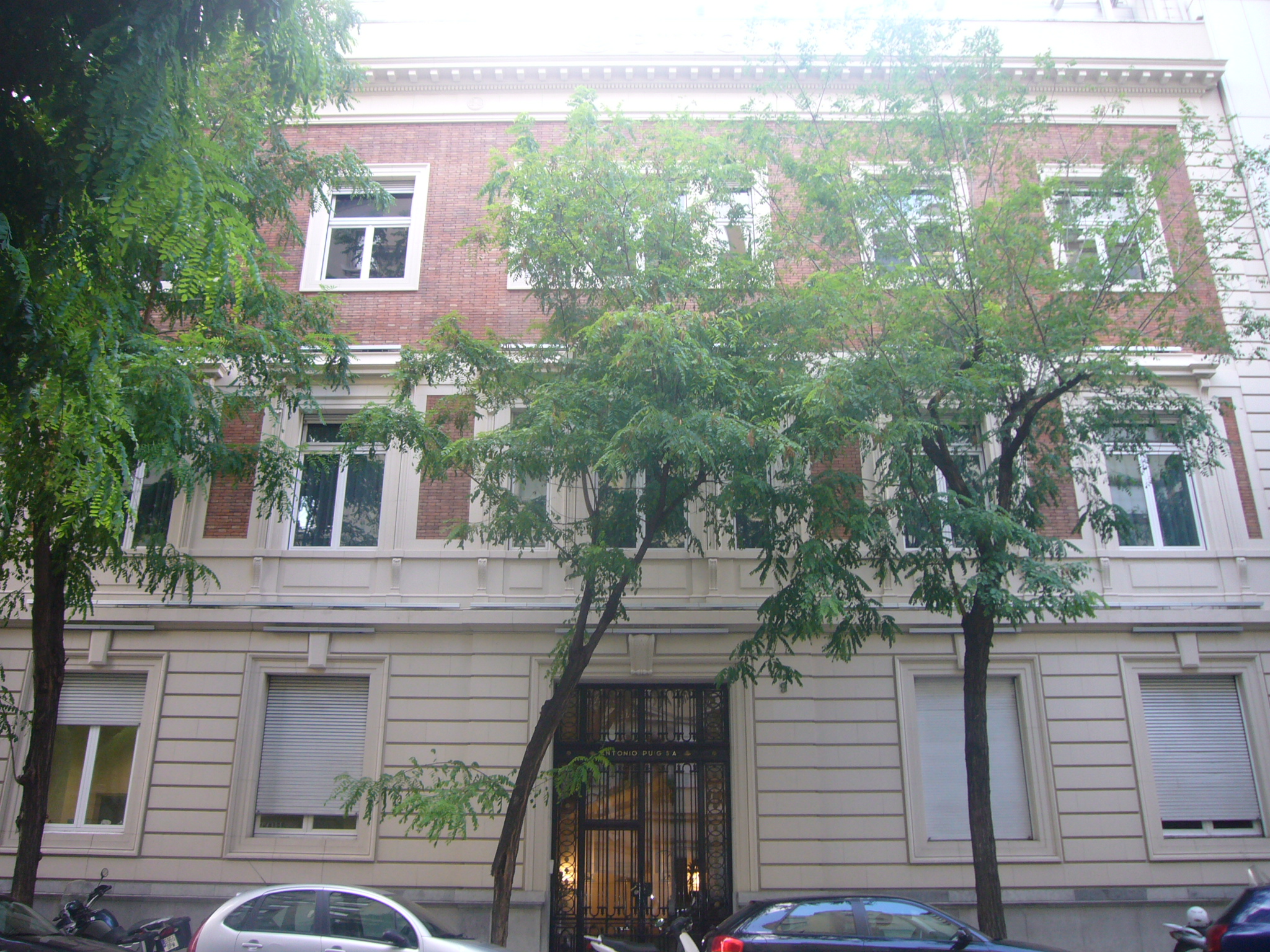
Former Puig headquarters, in Travessera de Gràcia, Barcelona

=== 20th century ===
The company's origins date back to 1914 when Antonio Puig Castelló founded the company. Initially the company took the name of its founder, being called Antonio Puig SA. From the beginning, the company oriented its business towards the cosmetic and fragrance sectors.

In 1922, the company marketed Milady, the first lipstick made in Spain.

In the 1940s the company started marketing the fragrance Agua Lavanda Puig, which became one of the flagship products of the company. During those same years, the founder Antonio Puig decided to move the factory and offices to a building located in Travessera de Gràcia street, in the Gràcia district in Barcelona, where the headquarters of the company remain until 2014.

In the following years, the four sons of the founder joined the company. Although the transition took place gradually, Antonio Puig eventually delegated its decision-making to his sons: Antonio and Mariano (died 2021) would focus on the perfume area, Jose Maria on the diversification department, and Enrique on the institutional relationships.

The international expansion of the company began in 1959 with the building of a new factory in the industrial estate Besòs, in Barcelona, and also with the creation of the first branch office outside Spain, in the United States. The US branch office was boosted by a letter written by a Spanish student in the University of Iowa, who lamented the impossibility of buying Agua Lavanda Puig in the US, as it was confirmed years later by company sources.

In 1968, Puig opened a branch office in Paris, at the same time that the company incorporated the Spanish designer brand Rabanne. In 1969, as a result of this collaboration the fragrance Calandre began to be marketed. In 1976, the company built a perfumery factory in Chartres, France. In 1987 Puig acquired Paco Rabanne's Fashion House.

One of the key milestones in the international expansion was the agreement reached in the 1980s with the Venezuelan designer Carolina Herrera in New York City to create and market all her fragrances. Years later, in 1995, Carolina Herrera fashion business area also joined Puig.

In 1997, Puig reached an agreement with Antonio Banderas for the creation and subsequent commercialization of the brand Antonio Banderas Fragrances. The following year the company acquired the brand Nina Ricci, keeping up with the policy of acquiring prestigious brands. In 1999 the Puig family refounded the company, renaming it "Puig Beauty & Fashion Group", but maintaining the same structure and the three business lines: fashion, fragrances, and cosmetics.

Puig acquired Spanish companies Perfumes Gal and Myrurgia,company that belonged to Monegal, Ramon Monegal's company. Also as the result of these procurements the brands Adolfo Dominguez, Massimo Dutti, and Heno de Pravia, among others, were assimilated into Puig.

=== 2000s ===
In 2002, the Japanese fashion firm Comme des Garçons joined the company and only a year later it was the turn of the Italian Prada. Both companies became part of Puig’s catalogue of fragrances.

Marc Puig, member of the third generation of the family, became the General Director and eventually CEO in 2007, leaving Manuel Puig as vice president. In 2008 the new management reached an agreement with the Colombian singer Shakira for the development of her fragrances.

In 2009 Puig Beauty & Fashion Group changed its trade name for the second time, becoming known simply as Puig.

=== 2010s ===
In 2010, Puig acquired the perfume and cosmetics license for Italian designer Valentino. Puig also became the majority shareholder of Jean Paul Gaultier, buying the 45% of the shares Jean Paul Gaultier Fashion House from the French group Hermès and 10% of Jean Paul Gaultier himself, who stayed on as Artistic Director until his retirement in January 2020. During 2013, Puig moved its headquarters in France to the Champs-Élysées in Paris.

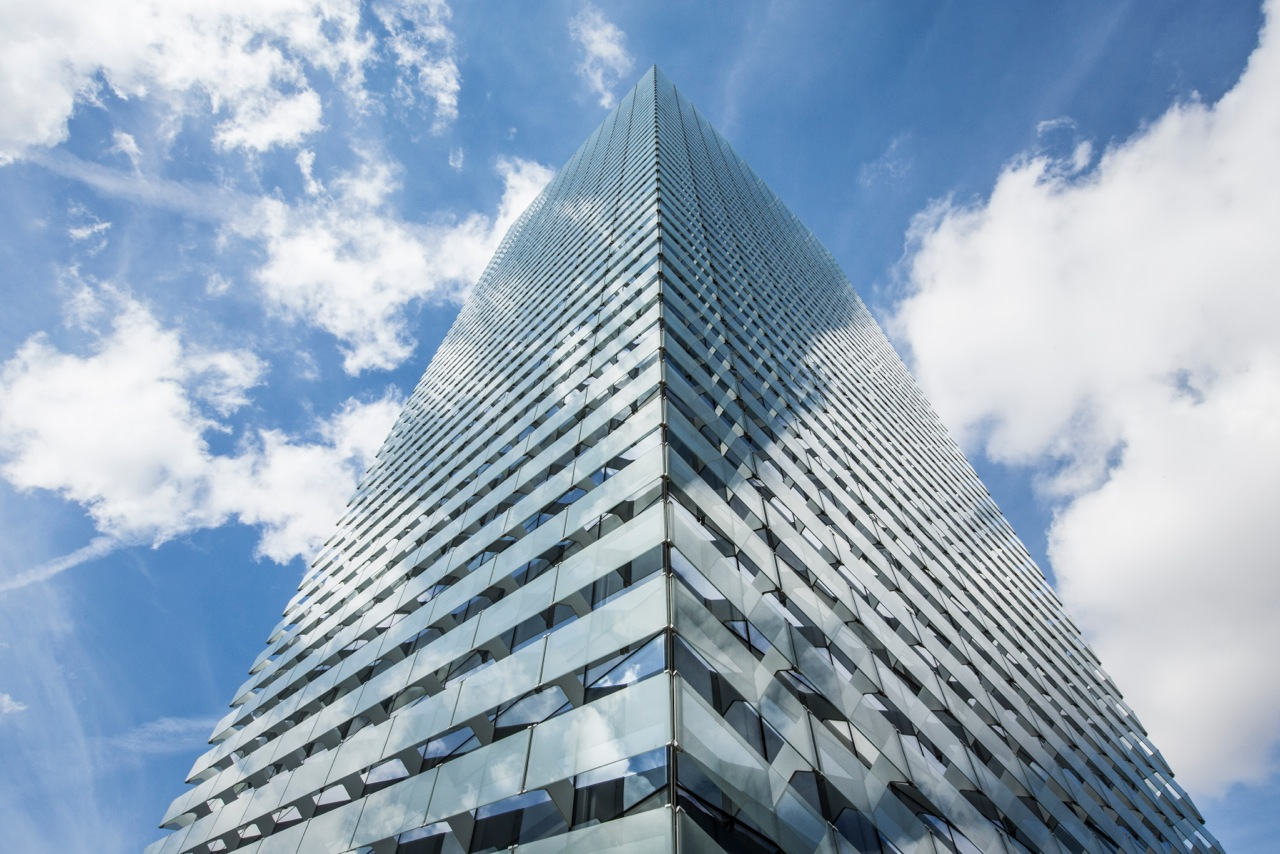
Torre Puig, Plaza Europa, Hospitalet de Llobregat (Barcelona)

In 2014, the company celebrated the centenary of its establishment with the inauguration of the new headquarters, located in Plaza de Europa of Hospitalet de Llobregat, called Torre Puig. This tower is a work of architect Rafael Moneo, laureate of the Pritzker Architecture Prize, and GCA Arquitectos. The building was inaugurated by the Prince of Asturias. At the entrance of the building there is a statue from Joan Miró, ceded for 2 years by Fundació Joan Miró. In 2024, Puig inaugurated a second building within the same complex, known as Torre Puig T2. The inauguration was carried out by Felipe VI and Letizia Ortiz, in their roles as King and Queen of Spain.

In January 2015, Puig acquired fragrance brands Penhaligons and L'Artisan Parfumeur. During 2018, Puig acquired several niche brands, including a majoritary shareholding of Dries Van Noten; boosting at the same time the development of Penhaligon's and L'Artisan Perfumeur. Besides that, the company has also completed a majoritary shareholding of Eric Buterbaugh Los Ángeles, as well as reached an agreement with Christian Louboutin, in order to develop its beauty business.

=== 2020s ===
In 2020, Puig acquired a majority stake in the British brand Charlotte Tilbury.

In 2022, the group acquired a majority stake in the Swedish luxury perfume brand Byredo, as well as in Kama Ayurveda and Loto del Sur.

In January 2024, the group acquired the brand Dr. Barbara Sturm to expand its presence in the skincare market. In March 2024 Dries Van Noten announced his retirement, stepping down from his namesake label.

In April 2024, Puig announced plans for an initial public offering (IPO) to raise more than €2.5 billion. The company completed its IPO the following month with a listing on the spanish Stock Exchange, valuing Puig at close to €14bn, leading to its inclusion in the IBEX 35 index. The Puig family continued to have majority voting shares of more than 90% following the offering. In conjunction with this development, the company implemented a rebranding of its corporate identity.

In August 2024, Puig expanded its presence in the United States by establishing a regional hub in Miami and opening new offices in New York City.

In March 2026, Puig was reported to be in merger talks with Estée Lauder, in a deal that would have created a group worth almost $40 billion. The two companies ended the discussions in May 2026; the compensation sought by Charlotte Tilbury, who retained a minority stake in her brand, was reported as the main obstacle. Puig's shares fell by about 15% after the talks ended.

== Market share ==
Puig reported revenues of €1,537 million in 2020. In 2021, the company reported €2,585 million in revenue and €234 million in net profit. This was followed by €3,600 million in revenue and €400 million in net income in 2022.

In 2023, Puig achieved record results for the third consecutive year, reporting €4.3 billion in revenue and €465 million in net profit, a 16% increase from the previous year.

In 2024, the company continued its upward trend, reaching €4,790 million in net revenues and an adjusted net profit of €551 million.

Puig operates seven production facilities—six in Europe and one in India. The company has strengthened its position in the market, reaching an 11.5% Global Value Share in the selective fragrances segment.

The Puig family retains 93% of the economic rights and 73.5% of the voting rights. Since 2024, Class B shares have been publicly traded; while they receive equal dividends, they carry fewer voting rights at shareholder meetings.
