= Charlotte Tilbury Beauty =

British cosmetics company

Charlotte Tilbury Beauty Ltd
- Type: Private
- Industry: Cosmetics
- Founded: 2013
- Founders: Charlotte Tilbury
- Headquarters: London, United Kingdom
- Products: Cosmetics
- Parent: Puig
- Website: www.charlottetilbury.com

Charlotte Tilbury Beauty Ltd is a British cosmetics company registered in the United Kingdom. It was founded in 2013 by Charlotte Tilbury, a British makeup artist. The company is headquartered in Surrey Street, London, in the United Kingdom.

Charlotte Tilbury products are available in 76 countries and are largely sold in retail stores for personal care and beauty products. These include multinational companies like Cult Beauty, Sephora, Bloomingdales, and ASOS. The brand is available in retail stores in Canada, France, Germany, Hong Kong, Ireland, Kuwait, Macau Sar, China, South Korea, Japan, Netherlands, Qatar, Saudi Arabia, Spain, United Arab Emirates, United Kingdom, Italy and United States.

== History ==
Charlotte Tilbury founded the company in September 2013, with a collection of 200 products. Charlotte Tilbury Beauty Ltd products became available in the United States in 2014.

In 2019, Charlotte Tilbury Beauty Ltd pledged £1 million to Women for Women International, for whom Tilbury herself is an ambassador.

On 23 June 2020, Spanish cosmetics and fragrance company Puig acquired a majority stake in the business for £1.3 billion through Prado Investments Limited, a London-based subsidiary.

=== Copyright lawsuit ===
In 2019, Islestarr Holdings Limited, the then-owner of the Charlotte Tilbury brand, was successful in a copyright infringement lawsuit against the discount supermarket store Aldi Süd, which sold a similar product to Tilbury's 'Filmstar Bronze and Glow' palette, launched in 2013. The lawsuit made two claims of infringement: the Starburst Design style of the packaging and the Powder Design style embossed in the powder's surface. Aldi launched its product in July 2018, with similar packaging and an embossed design on the power. The Aldi 'Broadway Shape and Glow' palette sold for £6.99 while the Charlotte Tilbury 'Filmstar Bronze and Glow' palette sold for £39. Aldi made approximately £140,000 from sales of their palette prior to the claim being brought.

Aldi admitted to having been aware of Tilbury's designs. The High Court of England and Wales granted summary judgment in favor of Islestarr Holdings Limited on the basis the designs were remarkably similar.

== Motorsport sponsorship ==
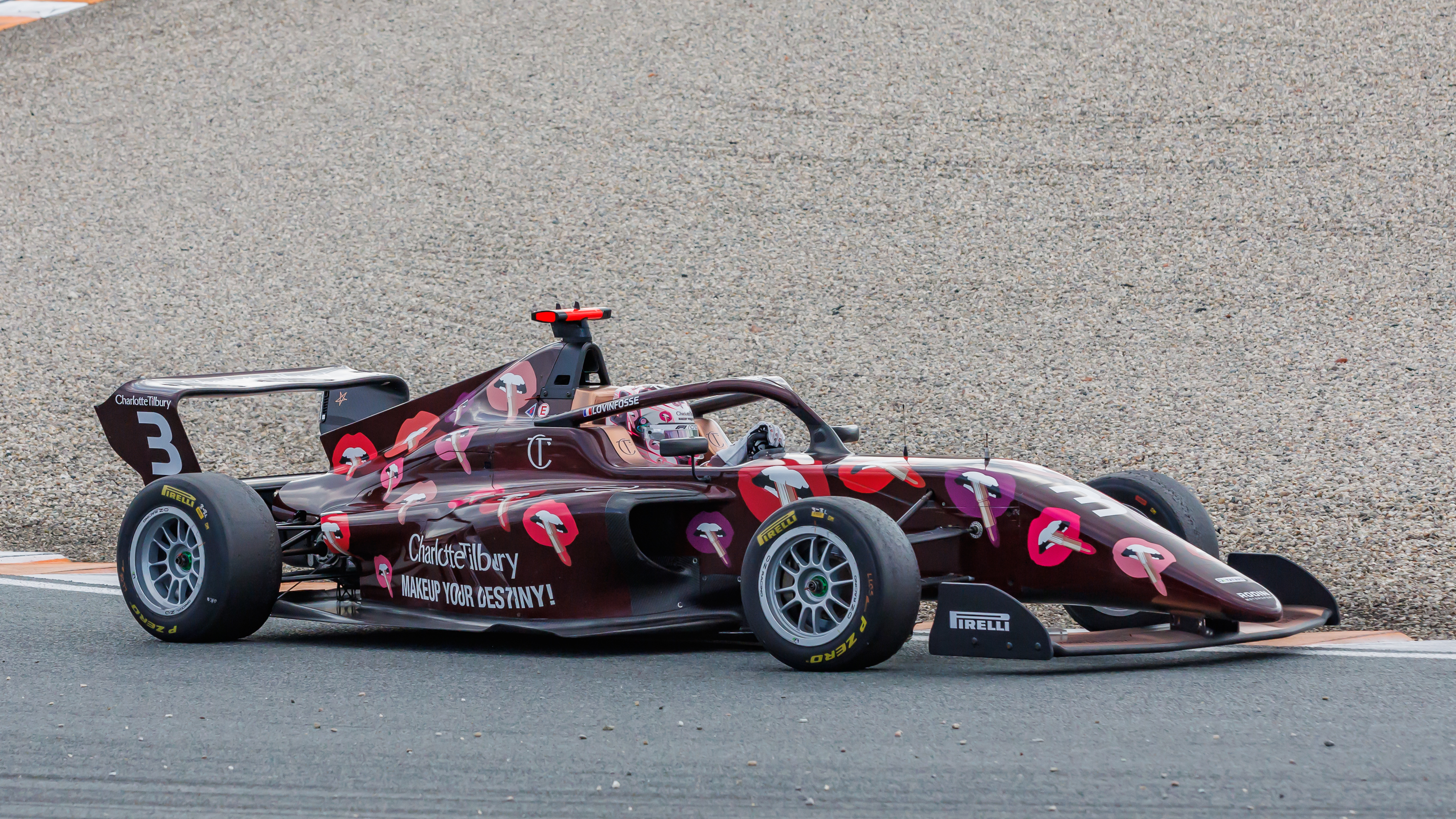
The Charlotte Tilbury Beauty F1 Academy car

In February 2024, Charlotte Tilbury Beauty signed a partnership with F1 Academy, an all-female Formula 4-level racing series founded by Formula One, to develop and prepare young female drivers for higher levels of competition. Charlotte Tilbury Beauty supported Lola Lovinfosse during the 2024 F1 Academy season. The partnership was extended to 2025 and included the Charlotte Tilbury Scholarship to support one girl’s participation in the 2026 British Indoor Karting Championship (Level 2). Charlotte Tilbury Beauty also supported Chloe Chong for the 2025 season.

== Awards ==
In 2014, Charlotte Tilbury Beauty Ltd won a Walpole Award for Emerging British Luxury Brand. In 2017, Charlotte Tilbury Beauty won the Indy Brand Beauty Award by CEW. In 2019, two of Charlotte Tilbury Beauty Ltd's products won Vogue Beauty Awards.

== See also ==
- SHEGLAM
