= Aiva Anagnostiadis =

Australian racing driver (born 2007)

- Nationality: (Australia) Australian
- Born: Aiva Alexis Anagnostiadis; 9 August 2007 (age 19) Melbourne, Victoria, Australia

F1 Academy
- Years active: 2025
- Teams: Hitech TGR
- Car number: 11
- Starts: 10
- Wins: 0
- Podiums: 0
- Poles: 0
- Fastest laps: 0
- Best finish: 17th in 2025

Previous series
- 2025; 2025; 2024: Eurocup-4 Spanish Winter; Formula Winter Series; F4 Indian

Aiva Alexis Anagnostiadis (born 9 August 2007) is an Australian racing driver who most recently competed in the GT4 Italian Series for Promodrive. She previously competed competed in F1 Academy for Hitech TGR with support from TAG Heuer.

Born and raised in Melbourne, Anagnostiadis began competitive kart racing aged eight and joined the Alpine Rac(H)er Karting Programme in 2023. She left the program in 2024 after it was scrapped by Alpine.

== Early career ==
=== Karting ===
Anagnostiadis started karting at the age of eight, mostly racing in Australia and most notably winning the Ladies Trophy in the 2021 Australian Karting Championship. A year after her Ladies Trophy title, Anagnostiadis represented Australia in that year's Karting Sprint Senior category of the FIA Motorsport Games. In the final, Anagnostiadis was involved in a crash at the start of the race and was forced to retire.

In late 2023, Anagnostiadis joined Alpine's Rac(H)er Karting programme. As a result, Anagnostiadis moved to the UK to compete in the RMC Winter Cup and Euro Trophy for Dan Holland Racing.

=== Formula 4 ===
==== 2024 ====
After participating in the Indian F4 Global Shootout Program in mid-2024 in France, Anagnostiadis competed in the Indian F4 Championship for MP Motorsport-ran Goa Aces JA Racing. Racing for the entire season, Anagnostiadis scored a best result of fifth in race two at the second Madras round and ended the season tenth in points.

==== 2025 ====
At the start of the year, it was announced that Anagnostiadis would compete for Cram Motorsport in both the Formula Winter Series and F4 Spanish Championships. In Formula Winter Series, she scored a best result of 20th in race one at Algarve in her only round in the series. Switching to the Eurocup-4 Winter Championship for the rest of the winter, Anagnostiadis raced in the first two rounds and scored a best finish of 23rd in race three at Jerez.

=== F1 Academy ===
==== 2025 ====
After finishing sixth in the final two races of the Indian F4 season, Anagnostiadis joined Hitech TGR with support from Tag Heuer to compete in the 2025 season of F1 Academy. Qualifying 16th on debut at Shanghai, Anagnostiadis climbed up to eighth in the sprint race to take her and the team's maiden points of the season, before finishing 13th in the feature race. The following round at Jeddah was a quiet one for Anagnostiadis as she finished 14th and 17th in the two races, and so was the third round at Miami, where she finished 14th in the sprint before the feature was cancelled by rain. Anagnostiadis would miss the sixth and seventh rounds at Singapore and Las Vegas, respectively, after sustaining a fractured left foot as she ended the year 17th in points.

=== Sportscar racing ===
In 2026, Anagnostiadis joined BMW-fielding Promodrive to compete in the inaugural season of the GT4 Italian Series alongside Andrea Palazzo in the Pro-Am class. After taking her maiden career podiums at Vallelunga and Mugello, Anagnostiadis capped off her maiden season in GT4 competition with a win at Monza to end the season fourth in class.

== Personal life ==
Anagnostiadis is of Italian and Greek descent. She is the daughter of former karter Barbara Anagnostiadis and the sister of Mercedes Junior Team member James Anagnostiadis.

== Karting record ==
=== Karting career summary ===
Season	Series	Team	Position
2018	SKUSA SuperNationals — Mini Swift	Tom Williamson Motorsport	41st
2018	Australian Kart Championship — Cadet 12		22nd
2020	Australian Kart Championship — KA2		33rd
2021	Australian Kart Championship — KA2		11th
2022	Australian Kart Championship — KA2		38th
2022	Australian Kart Championship — KA3 Senior		19th
2022	Karting Sprint Cup Senior	Team Australia	24th
2022	SKUSA SuperNationals — KA100 S		NC
2023	Australian Kart Championship — KA3 Senior		63rd
2023	Australian Kart Championship — TAG 125		17th
2024	Rotax Winter Cup — Rotax Senior	Dan Holland Racing	31st
2024	IAME Euro Series — X30 Senior	Argenti Motorsport	43rd

== Racing record ==
=== Racing career summary ===
Season	Series	Team	Races	Wins	Poles	F/Laps	Podiums	Points	Position
2024	F4 Indian Championship	Goa Aces JA Racing	15	0	0	0	0	47	10th
2025	Formula Winter Series	Cram Motorsport	3	0	0	0	0	0	38th
2025	Eurocup-4 Spanish Winter Championship	Cram Motorsport	6	0	0	0	0	0	36th
2025	F1 Academy	Hitech TGR	10	0	0	0	0	5	17th
2026	GT4 Italian Series – Pro-Am	Promodrive	10	1	0	0	3	69	4th

* Season still in progress.

=== Complete F4 Indian Championship results ===
(key) (Races in bold indicate pole position) (Races in italics indicate fastest lap)

Year	Entrant	1	2	3	4	5	6	7	8	9	10	11	12	13	14	15	Pos	Points
2024	Goa Aces JA Racing	MAD1; 1; 7	MAD1; 2; 9	MAD1; 3; 12	CHE; 1; 10	CHE; 2; 9	MAD2; 1; 6	MAD2; 2; 5	MAD2; 3; 14	MAD2; 4 Ret	KAR1; 1 Ret	KAR1; 2 Ret	KAR1; 3 Ret	KAR2; 1; 9	KAR2; 2; 6	KAR2; 3; 6	10th	47

=== Complete Formula Winter Series results ===
(key) (Races in bold indicate pole position) (Races in italics indicate fastest lap)

Year	Team	1	2	3	4	5	6	7	8	9	10	11	12	DC	Points
2025	Cram Motorsport	POR; 1; 20	POR; 2; 24	POR; 3; 26	CRT; 1	CRT; 2	CRT; 3	ARA; 1	ARA; 2	ARA; 3	CAT; 1	CAT; 2	CAT; 3	38th	0

=== Complete Eurocup-4 Spanish Winter Championship results ===
(key) (Races in bold indicate pole position) (Races in italics indicate fastest lap)

Year	Team	1	2	3	4	5	6	7	8	9	DC	Points
2025	Cram Motorsport	JER; 1; 29	JER; 2; 27	JER; 3; 23	POR; 1; 26	POR; 2; 25	POR; 3; 27	NAV; 1	NAV; 2	NAV; 3	36th	0

=== Complete F1 Academy results ===
(key) (Races in bold indicate pole position; races in italics indicate fastest lap)

Year	Team	1	2	3	4	5	6	7	8	9	10	11	12	13	14	15	DC	Points
2025	Hitech TGR	SHA; 1; 8	SHA; 2; 13	JED; 1; 14	JED; 2; 17	MIA; 1; 14	MIA; 2 C	MTL; 1; 8	MTL; 2; 14	MTL; 3 Ret	ZAN; 1; 16	ZAN; 2; 17	SIN; 1	SIN; 2	LVG; 1	LVG; 2	17th	5

=== Complete GT4 Italian Series results ===
(key) (Races in bold indicate pole position) (Races in italics indicate fastest lap)

Year	Team	Car	Class	1	2	3	4	5	6	7	8	9	10	DC	Points
2026	Promodrive	BMW M4 GT4 Evo (G82)	Pro-Am	MIS; 1 Ret	MIS; 2; 12	VAL; 1; 3	VAL; 2; 6	MUG; 1 Ret	MUG; 2; 3	IMO; 1; 8	IMO; 2; 6	MNZ; 1; 1	MNZ; 2; 4	4th	69
