= 2024 F4 Indian Championship =

Motor racing championship

The 2024 F4 Indian Championship was the second season of the F4 Indian Championship. It was a motor racing championship for open wheel, formula racing cars regulated according to FIA Formula 4 regulations. The season commenced on 24 August at Madras International Circuit and concluded on 17 November at Kari Motor Speedway.

== Drivers ==
All cars were run by MP Motorsport.

Team	No.	Driver	Class	Rounds
Chennai Turbo Riders	4	(India) Chetan Korada		2
Chennai Turbo Riders	6	(India) Chetan Surineni		5
Chennai Turbo Riders	24	(Canada) Hady-Noah Mimassi		4–5
Chennai Turbo Riders	36	(Australia) Isaac Demellweek	R	1–4
Chennai Turbo Riders	43	(Australia) Jayden Hamilton		1
Chennai Turbo Riders	43	(India) Mira Erda		1
Chennai Turbo Riders	54	(India) Dillon Zachariah		3
Bangalore Speedsters	5	(India) Jaden Pariat		1–4
Bangalore Speedsters	45	(India) Abhay Mohan		All
Hyderabad Blackbirds	7	(India) Shriya Lohia		All
Hyderabad Blackbirds	47	(South Africa) Aqil Alibhai		All
Ahmedabad Apex Racers	9	(India) Dhruvh Goswami		5
Ahmedabad Apex Racers	44	(India) Veer Sheth		1–4
Ahmedabad Apex Racers	55	(India) Divy Nandan		All
Rarh Bengal Tigers	10	(India) Tarun Muthiaiah		1–2
Rarh Bengal Tigers	23	(India) Arjun Chheda		4
Rarh Bengal Tigers	27	(India) Ruhaan Alva		All
Rarh Bengal Tigers	64	(India) Raiden Samervel	R	5
Rarh Bengal Tigers	65	(Netherlands) Esmee Kosterman		3
Speed Demons Delhi	12	(Denmark) Alba Hurup Larsen	R	1–2
Speed Demons Delhi	22	(Australia) Zakariya Mohammed	R	All
Speed Demons Delhi	33	(India) Saishiva Sankaran		4–5
Speed Demons Delhi	64	(India) Raiden Samervel	R	3
Goa Aces JA Racing	14	(Australia) Aiva Anagnostiadis	R	All
Goa Aces JA Racing	18	(India) Mira Erda		2
Goa Aces JA Racing	72	(Finland) Tristan Rajakoski		3–5
Goa Aces JA Racing	34	(Switzerland) Giancarlo Artho	R	1
Godspeed Kochi	34	(Switzerland) Giancarlo Artho	R	2–5
Godspeed Kochi	21	(India) Akhil Agarwal		3, 5
Godspeed Kochi	64	(India) Raiden Samervel	R	4
Godspeed Kochi	68	(Australia) Hugh Barter		1–2
Godspeed Kochi	73	(India) Aditya Patnaik		1

Icon	Legend
R	Rookie

=== Indian F4 Global Shootout Program ===
Racing Promotions Private Limited announced in May 2024 the F4 Global Shootout Program offering scholarships towards the participation in the championship. The estimated cost of the full season of the series is €120,000 and the winner of the shootout would get a fully paid seat in the upcoming season. The runner-up and the third placed driver would get 30% and 20% respectively of the winner's scholarship while each of other finalists would be awarded €15,000. The program was held on 9–11 July at Circuit du Var, France, in the partnership with the driving school AGS Formule 1. The following drivers were selected:

- (Mexico) Deko Abiakel
- (Australia) Aiva Anagnostiadis
- (Switzerland) Giancarlo Artho
- (India) Yashwanth Babu
- (Germany) Granit Demiri
- (Australia) Jayden Hamilton
- (Australia) Zakariya Mohammed
- (Australia) Georgia Morgan
- (United States) Thornton Thomas
- (Azerbaijan) Vishal Venkatraman

Giancarlo Artho was declared the winner of the shootout, followed by Deko Abiakel and Zakariya Mohammed.

== Calendar ==
All events were held in India and run in tandem with the Indian Racing League. The provisional dates were announced on 26 April.

Round		Circuit	Date	Pole position	Fastest lap	Winning driver	Winning team	Rookie winner
1	R1	Madras International Circuit, Chennai (Full Circuit)	24 August	(Australia) Hugh Barter	(Australia) Hugh Barter (Note: Hugh Barter set the fastest lap but according to the official broadcast he was ineligible to score the point for it since he retired from the race. Aqil Alibhai scored the point for setting the fastest lap among those classified as finishers in the race.)	(India) Jaden Pariat	Bangalore Speedsters	(Australia) Isaac Demellweek
1	R2	Madras International Circuit, Chennai (Full Circuit)	25 August		(Australia) Hugh Barter	(Australia) Hugh Barter	Godspeed Kochi	(Australia) Isaac Demellweek
1	R3	Madras International Circuit, Chennai (Full Circuit)	25 August	(Australia) Hugh Barter	(Australia) Hugh Barter	(Australia) Hugh Barter	Godspeed Kochi	(Australia) Isaac Demellweek
2	R1	Chennai Formula Racing Circuit, Chennai	1 September	(Australia) Hugh Barter	(Australia) Hugh Barter	(Australia) Hugh Barter	Godspeed Kochi	(Australia) Isaac Demellweek
2	R2	Chennai Formula Racing Circuit, Chennai	1 September		(Australia) Hugh Barter	(South Africa) Aqil Alibhai	Hyderabad Blackbirds	(Denmark) Alba Hurup Larsen
3	R1	Madras International Circuit, Chennai	14 September	(India) Jaden Pariat	(India) Jaden Pariat	(India) Jaden Pariat	Bangalore Speedsters	(Australia) Isaac Demellweek
3	R2	Madras International Circuit, Chennai	15 September		(India) Ruhaan Alva	(India) Ruhaan Alva	Rarh Bengal Tigers	(Australia) Isaac Demellweek
3	R3	Madras International Circuit, Chennai	15 September	(India) Jaden Pariat	(India) Jaden Pariat	(India) Veer Sheth	Ahmedabad Apex Racers	(Australia) Isaac Demellweek
3	R4	Madras International Circuit, Chennai	15 September		(South Africa) Aqil Alibhai	(South Africa) Aqil Alibhai	Hyderabad Blackbirds	(Australia) Isaac Demellweek
4	R1	Kari Motor Speedway, Coimbatore	19 October	(India) Ruhaan Alva	(South Africa) Aqil Alibhai	(South Africa) Aqil Alibhai	Hyderabad Blackbirds	(Australia) Zakariya Mohammed
4	R2	Kari Motor Speedway, Coimbatore	20 October		(South Africa) Aqil Alibhai	(South Africa) Aqil Alibhai	Hyderabad Blackbirds	(Australia) Isaac Demellweek
4	R3	Kari Motor Speedway, Coimbatore	20 October	(South Africa) Aqil Alibhai	(South Africa) Aqil Alibhai	(South Africa) Aqil Alibhai	Hyderabad Blackbirds	(India) Raiden Samervel
5	R1	Kari Motor Speedway, Coimbatore	16 November	(India) Ruhaan Alva	(Canada) Hady-Noah Mimassi	(South Africa) Aqil Alibhai	Hyderabad Blackbirds	(India) Raiden Samervel
5	R2	Kari Motor Speedway, Coimbatore	17 November		(India) Ruhaan Alva	(India) Ruhaan Alva	Rarh Bengal Tigers	(India) Raiden Samervel
5	R3	Kari Motor Speedway, Coimbatore	17 November	(India) Saishiva Sankaran	(India) Ruhaan Alva	(India) Ruhaan Alva	Rarh Bengal Tigers	(India) Raiden Samervel

== Championship standings ==
Points were awarded as follows:

Position	1st	2nd	3rd	4th	5th	6th	7th	8th	9th	10th	Pole	FL
Points	25	18	15	12	10	8	6	4	2	1	2	1

=== Drivers' Championship ===
Pos	Driver	MAD1			CHE		MAD2				KAR1			KAR2			Pts
Pos	Driver	R1	R2	R3	R1	R2	R1	R2	R3	R4	R1	R2	R3	R1	R2	R3	Pts
1	(South Africa) Aqil Alibhai	2	6	2	DNS	1	2	2	4	1	1	1	**1**	1	2	3	282
2	(India) Ruhaan Alva	3	5	3	2	4	5	1	2	3	**2**	3	2	**2**	1	1	264
3	(India) Jaden Pariat	1	7	4	Ret	3	**1**	3	**8**	4	3	2	3				168
4	(India) Divy Nandan	4	3	5	8	**2**	7	6	5	2	6	5	6	5	3	12	154
5	(Australia) Hugh Barter	**Ret**	1	**1**	**1**	5											95
6	(Australia) Isaac Demellweek	6	2	7	5	DSQ	4	4	6	5	11	6	Ret				92
7	(India) Veer Sheth	5	4	Ret	4	7	Ret	9	1	Ret	7	9	4				87
8	(India) Abhay Mohan	DNS	8	6	3	6	3	7	3	13	4	10	11	DNS	WD	WD	84
9	(Canada) Hady-Noah Mimassi										10	14	5	3	8	2	49
10	(Australia) Aiva Anagnostiadis	7	9	12	10	9	6	5	14	Ret	Ret	Ret	Ret	9	6	6	47
11	(India) Raiden Samervel						Ret	Ret	13	9	Ret	8	7	7	4	5	40
12	(India) Saishiva Sankaran										8	Ret	9	4	5	**10**	31
13	(Australia) Zakariya Mohammed	12	Ret	Ret	Ret	11	Ret	12	12	12	5	7	8	13	7	11	26
14	(India) Dhurvh Goswami													6	10	4	21
15	(Switzerland) Giancarlo Artho	11	Ret	Ret	7	10	Ret	11	Ret	7	9	12	10	8	Ret	Ret	20
16	(India) Akhil Agarwal						8	8	9	8				12	12	9	16
17	(India) Dillon Zachariah						Ret	Ret	7	6							14
18	(Denmark) Alba Hurup Larsen	13	11	10	6	8											13
19	(India) Arjun Chheda										13	4	Ret				12
20	(India) Chetan Surineni													10	9	7	9
21	(India) Tarun Muthiaiah	9	Ret	8	9	Ret											8
22	(India) Shriya Lohia	8	10	9	12	12	Ret	Ret	Ret	10	14	13	12	14	Ret	Ret	8
23	(Finland) Tristan Rajakoski						Ret	13	10	Ret	12	11	Ret	11	11	8	5
24	(Netherlands) Esmee Kosterman						9	10	11	11							3
25	(India) Mira Erda	10	Ret	11	13	Ret											1
26	(India) Chetan Korada				11	Ret											0
27	(India) Aditya Patnaik	14	Ret	DNS													0
–	(Australia) Jayden Hamilton	WD	WD	WD													–
Pos	Driver	R1	R2	R3	R1	R2	R1	R2	R3	R4	R1	R2	R3	R1	R2	R3	Pts
Pos	Driver	MAD1			CHE		MAD2				KAR1			KAR2			Pts

Colour	Result
Gold	Winner
Silver	Second place
Bronze	Third place
Green	Points classification
Blue	Non-points classification
Blue	Non-classified finish (NC)
Purple	Retired, not classified (Ret)
Red	Did not qualify (DNQ)
Red	Did not pre-qualify (DNPQ)
Black	Disqualified (DSQ)
White	Did not start (DNS)
White	Withdrew (WD)
White	Race cancelled (C)
Blank	Did not practice (DNP)
Blank	Did not arrive (DNA)
Blank	Excluded (EX)

**Bold** – Pole
Italics – Fastest Lap
† — Did not finish, but classified
Rookie
