= Mary Greenwell =

British make-up artist

Mary Claire Greenwell is a British make-up artist. She has been said to be "widely regarded as one of the most influential makeup artists in the global fashion and beauty industries", and was Princess Diana's makeup artist in the 1990s.

She was appointed M.B.E. in the 2025 Birthday Honours "For services to the Beauty and Fashion Industries and to Charity". In the London Gazette she is described as "Makeup Artist and Ambassador, British Beauty Council".

In November 2025 she was the guest on BBC Radio 4's Desert Island Discs.
