= 2025 F4 Chinese Championship =

The 2025 F4 Chinese Championship (Eastroc FIA F4 Chinese Championship) was the eleventh season of the F4 Chinese Championship. It commenced on 18 April at Ningbo International Circuit and concluded on Zhuhai International Circuit on 12 October.

== Teams and drivers ==
Teams	No.	Drivers	Status	Rounds
(China) Kai Fei Motorsport	2	(Hong Kong) Patrick Tsang	M	All
(China) Kai Fei Motorsport	33	(Hong Kong) Andy Law	M	All
(China) Pointer Racing	3	(China) Liu Taiji	C	2–4
(China) Pointer Racing	59	(China) Yuanyang Zeshi	C	2–4
(China) Apollo RFN Racing Team by Blackjack	5	Andrey Dubynin (Note: Dubynin and Turkin are Russian, but they compete as neutral competitors as Russian national emblems were banned by the FIA following the Russian invasion of Ukraine.)		All
(China) Apollo RFN Racing Team by Blackjack	11	(Hong Kong) Tiger Zhang		1–3
(China) Apollo RFN Racing Team by Blackjack	12	(Macau) Marcus Cheong	C	4
(China) Apollo RFN Racing Team by Blackjack	89	(France) Héloïse Goldberg		5
(China) Black Blade Racing	6	(China) Ryan Liu	C	1
(China) Black Blade Racing	17	(China) Cheng Meng	C	3–5
(China) Black Blade Racing	63	(China) Chen Sicong	C	All
(China) Black Blade Racing	99	(China) Xu Yingjie		2
(China) ONE Motorsports	7	(China) Pan Yiming	C	All
(China) ONE Motorsports	87	(China) Dai Yuhao	C	All
(China) Apollo RFN Racing Team by ART	8	(China) Huang Chujian	C	2, 4
(China) Apollo RFN Racing Team by ART	27	(China) Jack Pang	C	5
(China) Apollo RFN Racing Team by ART	28	(China) Lu Ye	C	3
(China) Apollo RFN Racing Team by ART	39	(China) Li Zebing	C	1
(China) Apollo RFN Racing Team by ART	98	Viktor Turkin	M	All
(China) Asia Racing Team	10	(Macau) Vernice Lao		4
(China) Champ Pro Racing	13	(Macau) Tiago Rodrigues	G	5
(China) Venom Motorsport	15	(China) Wang Yuzhe		All
(China) Venom Motorsport	32	(China) Yu Yan		2–5
(China) Venom Motorsport	76	(China) "Midnight Hurricane"		1
(China) Black Blade GP	16	(China) Mi Qi	C	2
(China) Black Blade GP	17	(China) Cheng Meng	C	1–2
(China) Black Blade GP	25	(China) Zhang Jun	C	1
(China) Black Blade GP	29	(China) Liu Binghong	C	3–5
(China) Black Blade GP	95	(China) Hu Heng	M	3
(China) Geeke ACM Racing	18	(China) Shi Wei	C	2, 4
(China) GYT Racing	19	(China) Tu Yate	C	5
(China) GYT Racing	23	(China) Xu Dan	M	1, 3
(China) GYT Racing	56	(China) Jing Zefeng	C	2, 4
(China) Yinqiao ACM Geeke Racing	21	(Hong Kong) Zhang Shimo		All
(China) Yinqiao ACM Geeke Racing	86	(China) Fei Jun	M	1–2
(China) SilverRocket AME Formula Team	22	(China) Li Jia	M	1–4
(China) Venom Pole Motorsport	24	(China) Yang Peng	C	All
(Chinese Taipei) Team KRC	58	(Chinese Taipei) Ethan Ho		All
(Chinese Taipei) Team KRC	66	(China) Wu Jiaxin	M	2
(Chinese Taipei) Team KRC	67	(Chinese Taipei) Richard Lin	M	1
(China) Henmax Motorsport	61	(Hong Kong) Hon Yingfu	M	1–3, 5
(China) Champ Motorsport	68	(China) Wang Yi	M	1–4
(China) Champ Motorsport	88	(Hong Kong) Denise Yeung	M	5
(China) Champ Motorsport	91	(Hong Kong) Kimi Chan		All
(China) Happiness Racing	77	(China) Zhu Zhenyu	M	2
(China) Frankenstein Racing	82	(China) Zhou Yiran	C	4

Icon	Class
M	Drivers that compete in the Masters Class
C	Drivers that compete in the CFGP Class
G	Guest drivers ineligible for Drivers' Championship

== Race calendar and results ==
The provisional calendar featured 5 rounds and 18 races with the final round to be held at the Zhuhai International Circuit or Wuhan International Circuit. After the cancellation of the two-race round in the support of the 2025 Chinese Grand Prix, a new season opener featuring four races was added at the Ningbo International Circuit on 18–20 April, the initial stage of the third round. In March, the venue of the season finale was announced to be in Wuhan on 3–5 October, but was later switched to Zhuhai on 10–12 October.

Round		Circuit	Date	Pole Position	Fastest Lap	Winning Driver	Winning Team	Master Class Winner	Supporting
1	R1	Ningbo International Circuit, Ningbo	19 April	(Hong Kong) Zhang Shimo	(Hong Kong) Zhang Shimo	(Hong Kong) Zhang Shimo	(China) Yinqiao ACM Geeke Racing	(China) Wang Yi	Yong Zhe Wei Wang Superbike Carnival
1	R2	Ningbo International Circuit, Ningbo	19 April		(Hong Kong) Zhang Shimo	(China) Ryan Liu	(China) Black Blade Racing	(China) Wang Yi	Yong Zhe Wei Wang Superbike Carnival
1	R3	Ningbo International Circuit, Ningbo	20 April	(Hong Kong) Zhang Shimo	(Hong Kong) Zhang Shimo	(Hong Kong) Zhang Shimo	(China) Yinqiao ACM Geeke Racing	(China) Wang Yi	Yong Zhe Wei Wang Superbike Carnival
1	R4	Ningbo International Circuit, Ningbo	20 April		(Hong Kong) Zhang Shimo	(Hong Kong) Zhang Shimo	(China) Yinqiao ACM Geeke Racing	(China) Wang Yi	Yong Zhe Wei Wang Superbike Carnival
2	R5	Shanghai International Circuit, Shanghai	17 May	(Hong Kong) Zhang Shimo	(China) Dai Yuhao	(China) Dai Yuhao	(China) ONE Motorsports	(China) Wang Yi	China GT Championship; Lamborghini Super Trofeo Asia; Toyota Gazoo Racing China GR86 Cup
2	R6	Shanghai International Circuit, Shanghai	17 May		(China) Dai Yuhao	(Hong Kong) Zhang Shimo	(China) Yinqiao ACM Geeke Racing	(China) Wang Yi	China GT Championship; Lamborghini Super Trofeo Asia; Toyota Gazoo Racing China GR86 Cup
2	R7	Shanghai International Circuit, Shanghai	18 May	(China) Dai Yuhao	(Hong Kong) Zhang Shimo	(China) Dai Yuhao	(China) ONE Motorsports	(China) Wang Yi	China GT Championship; Lamborghini Super Trofeo Asia; Toyota Gazoo Racing China GR86 Cup
2	R8	Shanghai International Circuit, Shanghai	18 May		(Hong Kong) Zhang Shimo	(Hong Kong) Zhang Shimo	(China) Yinqiao ACM Geeke Racing	(China) Wang Yi	China GT Championship; Lamborghini Super Trofeo Asia; Toyota Gazoo Racing China GR86 Cup
3	R9	Zhuhai International Circuit, Zhuhai	14 June	(Hong Kong) Kimi Chan	(China) Chen Sicong	(Hong Kong) Zhang Shimo	(China) Yinqiao ACM Geeke Racing	(China) Wang Yi	Circuit Hero
3	R10	Zhuhai International Circuit, Zhuhai	14 June		(Hong Kong) Kimi Chan	(Hong Kong) Zhang Shimo	(China) Yinqiao ACM Geeke Racing	(China) Hu Heng	Circuit Hero
3	R11	Zhuhai International Circuit, Zhuhai	15 June	(Hong Kong) Kimi Chan	(Hong Kong) Kimi Chan	(Hong Kong) Zhang Shimo	(China) Yinqiao ACM Geeke Racing	(China) Wang Yi	Circuit Hero
3	R12	Zhuhai International Circuit, Zhuhai	15 June		(Hong Kong) Kimi Chan	(Hong Kong) Zhang Shimo	(China) Yinqiao ACM Geeke Racing	(China) Wang Yi	Circuit Hero
4	R13	Chengdu Tianfu International Circuit, Chengdu	13 September	(China) Chen Sicong	(Hong Kong) Kimi Chan	(China) Chen Sicong	(China) Black Blade Racing	(Hong Kong) Andy Law	Lotus Cup China; Lynk & Co City Racing; Mintimes GP. MRC
4	R14	Chengdu Tianfu International Circuit, Chengdu	13 September		(Hong Kong) Zhang Shimo	(Hong Kong) Zhang Shimo	(China) Yinqiao ACM Geeke Racing	(Hong Kong) Andy Law	Lotus Cup China; Lynk & Co City Racing; Mintimes GP. MRC
4	R15	Chengdu Tianfu International Circuit, Chengdu	14 September	(Hong Kong) Kimi Chan	(China) Chen Sicong	(Hong Kong) Zhang Shimo	(China) Yinqiao ACM Geeke Racing	(China) Wang Yi	Lotus Cup China; Lynk & Co City Racing; Mintimes GP. MRC
4	R16	Chengdu Tianfu International Circuit, Chengdu	14 September		(Hong Kong) Kimi Chan	(Hong Kong) Kimi Chan	(China) Champ Motorsport	(China) Li Jia	Lotus Cup China; Lynk & Co City Racing; Mintimes GP. MRC
5	R17	Zhuhai International Circuit, Zhuhai	11 October	(Hong Kong) Kimi Chan	(China) Dai Yuhao	(China) Dai Yuhao	(China) ONE Motorsports	Viktor Turkin	TBC
5	R18	Zhuhai International Circuit, Zhuhai	11 October		(Hong Kong) Zhang Shimo	(Hong Kong) Zhang Shimo	(China) Yinqiao ACM Geeke Racing	(Hong Kong) Andy Law	TBC
5	R19	Zhuhai International Circuit, Zhuhai	12 October	(China) Chen Sicong	(Hong Kong) Zhang Shimo	(Hong Kong) Zhang Shimo	(China) Yinqiao ACM Geeke Racing	(Hong Kong) Andy Law	TBC
5	R20	Zhuhai International Circuit, Zhuhai	12 October		(China) Dai Yuhao	(Hong Kong) Zhang Shimo	(China) Yinqiao ACM Geeke Racing	(Hong Kong) Andy Law	TBC

== Championship standings ==
Points were awarded as follows:

Position	**1st**	**2nd**	**3rd**	**4th**	**5th**	**6th**	**7th**	**8th**	**9th**	**10th**
Points	25	18	15	12	10	8	6	4	2	1

=== Drivers' championship ===
Pos	Driver	NIC				SIC				ZIC1				CTC				ZIC2				Pts
1	(Hong Kong) Zhang Shimo	**1**	11	**1**	1	**3**	1	2	1	1	1	1	1	6	1	1	2	4	1	1	1	424
2	(Hong Kong) Kimi Chan	4	3	2	6	5	4	4	2	**4**	2	**3**	2	2	4	**6**	1	**5**	4	2	2	291
3	(China) Dai Yuhao	2	18	3	5	1	2	**1**	3	5	5	2	6	9	2	3	Ret	1	5	Ret	4	254
4	(China) Chen Sicong	3	6	4	9	2	10	5	4	8	20	9	3	**1**	6	2	3	2	9	**Ret**	5	197
5	Andrey Dubynin	5	Ret	5	8	4	3	3	Ret	3	3	5	4	19	8	4	19	6	2	Ret	6	170
6	(Chinese Taipei) Ethan Ho	8	15	6	2	Ret	9	6	13	2	Ret	4	DSQ	3	5	9	7	7	3	3	3	156
7	(China) Wang Yuzhe	7	5	7	4	8	16	11	7	7	6	13	10	7	9	7	4	DNS	DNS	DNS	WD	85
8	(China) Yu Yan					7	8	8	14	Ret	11	6	7	5	3	15	5	14	Ret	4	Ret	75
9	(China) Cheng Meng	NC	Ret	10	13	9	5	7	6	Ret	Ret	8	9	4	Ret	5	11	Ret	8	7	Ret	67
10	(China) Liu Binghong									6	4	11	5	8	18	18	10	8	6	5	7	65
11	(China) Wang Yi	9	2	11	10	6	6	9	5	10	15	7	8	Ret	Ret	11	18					60
12	(China) Ryan Liu	6	1	8	3																	52
13	(China) "Midnight Hurricane"	10	4	9	7																	21
14	(China) Jing Zefeng					13	11	13	8					10	7	8	8					19
15	(Hong Kong) Andy Law	15	12	20	DSQ	12	21	Ret	Ret	15	18	Ret	18	11	11	Ret	Ret	16	10	6	8	14
16	(China) Yang Peng	20	10	14	14	Ret	DNS	17	15	11	8	19	20	16	19	16	Ret	10	15	8	Ret	11
17	(Macau) Marcus Cheong													12	10	10	6					10
18	(China) Xu Yingjie					10	7	10	18													8
19	(China) Pan Yiming	12	7	17	12	11	13	12	11	16	16	21	Ret	20	14	Ret	14	12	13	11	DSQ	6
20	(Hong Kong) Tiger Zhang	17	14	15	21	15	22†	14	21	13	7	Ret	Ret									6
21	(China) Fei Jun	11	8	16	11	Ret	15	15	9													6
22	(France) Héloïse Goldberg																	9	Ret	12	9	6
23	Viktor Turkin	14	9	Ret	16	16	14	16	10	14	13	10	11	Ret	17	Ret	17	11	12	10	Ret	6
24	(China) Liu Taiji					Ret	Ret	21	Ret	9	9	16	14	13	12	20	Ret					4
25	(Hong Kong) Patrick Tsang	16	13	18	18	14	20	19	17	Ret	14	18	12	Ret	16	12	Ret	13	Ret	9	10	3
26	(China) Yuanyang Zeshi					19	DNS	22	19	12	10	15	15	15	13	14	9					3
27	(China) Tu Yate																	20	11	13	11	1
28	(China) Hu Heng									17	12	12	13									0
29	(China) Shi Wei					17	12	18	12					14	Ret	13	DNS					0
30	(China) Li Jia	13	20	12	15	18	18	26	20	18	17	14	16	Ret	21	21	16					0
31	(Hong Kong) Denise Yeung																	15	Ret	14	12	0
32	(China) Huang Chujian					21	17	23	23					17	15	17	12					0
33	(Hong Kong) Hon Yingfu	21	16	21	20	20	19	25	22	19	22	17	19					Ret	16	Ret	13	0
34	(Chinese Taipei) Richard Lin	18	19	13	17																	0
35	(Macau) Vernice Lao													18	22†	19	13					0
36	(China) Jack Pang																	19	14	DNS	WD	0
37	(China) Zhou Yiran													Ret	20	Ret	15					0
38	(China) Wu Jiaxin					Ret	23†	20	16													0
39	(China) Lu Ye									Ret	19	Ret	17									0
40	(China) Li Zebing	DNS	17	Ret	WD																	0
41	(China) Xu Dan	19	Ret	19	19					20	21	20	21									0
42	(China) Mi Qi					22	Ret	24	24†													0
–	(China) Zhu Zhenyu					Ret	Ret	DNS	DNS													–
–	(China) Zhang Jun	WD	WD	WD	WD																	–
Guest drivers ineligible to score points
–	(Macau) Tiago Rodrigues																	3	7	Ret	Ret	–
Pos	Driver	NIC				SIC				ZIC1				CTC				ZIC2				Pts

Colour	Result
Gold	Winner
Silver	Second place
Bronze	Third place
Green	Points classification
Blue	Non-points classification
Blue	Non-classified finish (NC)
Purple	Retired, not classified (Ret)
Red	Did not qualify (DNQ)
Red	Did not pre-qualify (DNPQ)
Black	Disqualified (DSQ)
White	Did not start (DNS)
White	Withdrew (WD)
White	Race cancelled (C)
Blank	Did not practice (DNP)
Blank	Did not arrive (DNA)
Blank	Excluded (EX)

**Bold** – Pole
Italics – Fastest Lap
† — Did not finish, but classified

=== Teams' championship ===
Pos	Driver	NIC				SIC				ZIC1				CTC				ZIC2				Pts
1	(China) Yinqiao ACM Geeke Racing	1	8	1	1	3	1	2	1	1	1	1	1	6	1	1	2	4	1	1	1	430
1	(China) Yinqiao ACM Geeke Racing	11	11	16	11	Ret	15	15	9													430
2	(China) Champ Motorsport	4	2	2	6	5	4	4	2	4	2	3	2	2	4	6	1	5	4	2	2	351
2	(China) Champ Motorsport	9	3	11	10	6	6	9	5	10	15	7	8	Ret	Ret	11	18	15	Ret	14	12	351
3	(China) Black Blade Racing	3	1	4	3	2	7	5	4	8	20	8	3	1	6	2	3	2	8	7	5	297
3	(China) Black Blade Racing	6	6	8	9	10	10	10	18	Ret	Ret	9	9	4	Ret	5	11	Ret	9	Ret	Ret	297
4	(China) ONE Motorsports	2	7	3	5	1	2	1	3	5	5	2	6	9	2	3	14	1	5	11	4	260
4	(China) ONE Motorsports	12	18	17	12	11	13	12	11	16	16	21	Ret	20	14	Ret	Ret	12	13	Ret	DSQ	260
5	(China) Apollo RFN Racing Team by Blackjack	5	14	5	8	4	3	3	21	3	3	5	4	12	8	4	6	6	2	12	6	192
5	(China) Apollo RFN Racing Team by Blackjack	17	Ret	15	21	15	22†	14	Ret	13	7	Ret	Ret	19	10	10	19	9	Ret	Ret	9	192
6	(China) Venom Motorsport	7	4	7	4	7	8	8	7	7	6	6	7	5	3	7	4	14	Ret	4	Ret	181
6	(China) Venom Motorsport	10	5	9	7	8	16	11	14	Ret	11	13	10	7	9	15	5	DNS	DNS	DNS	WD	181
7	(Chinese Taipei) Team KRC	8	15	6	2	Ret	9	6	13	2	Ret	4	DSQ	3	5	9	7	7	3	3	3	156
7	(Chinese Taipei) Team KRC	18	19	13	17	Ret	23†	20	16													156
8	(China) Black Blade GP	Ret	Ret	10	13	9	5	7	6	6	4	11	5	8	18	18	10	8	6	5	7	92
8	(China) Black Blade GP	WD	WD	WD	WD	22	Ret	24	24†	17	12	12	13									92
9	(China) GYT Racing	19	Ret	19	19	13	11	13	8	20	21	20	21	10	7	8	8	18	11	13	11	20
10	(China) Kai Fei Motorsport	15	12	18	18	12	20	19	17	15	14	18	12	11	11	12	Ret	13	10	6	8	17
10	(China) Kai Fei Motorsport	16	13	20	DSQ	14	21	Ret	Ret	Ret	18	Ret	18	Ret	16	Ret	Ret	16	Ret	9	10	17
11	(China) Venom Pole Motorsport	20	10	14	14	Ret	DNS	17	15	11	8	19	20	16	19	16	Ret	10	15	8	Ret	11
12	(China) Pointer Racing					19	DNS	21	19	9	9	15	14	13	12	14	9					7
12	(China) Pointer Racing					Ret	DNS	22	Ret	12	10	16	15	15	13	20	Ret					7
13	(China) Apollo RFN Racing Team by ART	14	9	Ret	16	16	14	16	10	14	13	10	11	17	15	17	12	11	12	10	Ret	6
13	(China) Apollo RFN Racing Team by ART	DNS	17	Ret	WD	21	17	23	23	Ret	19	Ret	17	Ret	17	Ret	17	17	14	DNS	WD	6
14	(China) Geeke ACM Racing					17	12	18	12					14	Ret	13	Ret					0
15	(China) SilverRocket AME Formula Team	13	20	12	15	18	18	26	20	18	17	14	16	Ret	21	21	16					0
16	(China) Henmax Motorsport	21	16	21	20	20	19	25	22	19	22	17	19					Ret	16	Ret	13	0
17	(China) Asia Racing Team													18	Ret	19	13					0
18	(China) Frankenstein Racing													Ret	20	Ret	15					0
–	(China) Happiness Racing					Ret	Ret	DNS	DNS													–
Pos	Driver	NIC				SIC				ZIC1				CTC				ZIC2				Pts
