= Denise Yeung =

Hong Kong racing driver

- Nationality: Hong Kong
- Born: 楊嘉怡
- Categorisation: FIA Bronze

Denise Yeung (Chinese: 楊嘉怡; pinyin: Yeung Jia Yi) is a racing driver in the Asia Pacific Region from Hong Kong.

== Early life ==
Yeung's father took her to the Macau GP as a kid. She was struck by Ayrton Senna's performance at the 1983 Macau Formula Three Grand Prix. He's her favourite driver since.

Yeung tried karting in her teenage years, but didn't have the money to carry on.

== Racing career ==
Yeung debuted in Geely Cup, in 2009. She later tried to secure a deal in CTCC. The Team 778 agreed to lease her an unused Honda Integra Type R for the Macau GP. Cup Noodles wanted to sponsor a female racer. There was a mandatory race, to get to race at Macau. Therefore, she raced the 778 Honda Integra Type R at Sepang. She send entered the 2012 Macau GP. She has raced in the 2013 TCA, finishing with a first and second runner up placing, and the 2015 HTCC, with a second runner up placing. In 2014, thanks to her connection with 778, she raced a Senova D60 in the Chinese Racing Cup, as part of the Hong-Kong squad.

== Retirement ==
Yeung gave up racing around 2017 due to lack of funds.

Yeung set-up her own automotive-themed YouTube channel.

== Back to racing ==
During the COVID-19 pandemic, Yeung missed racing and wanted to go back.

At around 50, Yeung set-up a new challenge : racing at Le Mans. Despite having no experience of racing in Europe, nor of endurance races and LMP3. She entered a FIA F4 event, in order to get a bronze status.

Yeung got in touch with Team Virage and tried their Ligier JS P3 at the Paul Ricard. She entered the Le Mans Cup event at Le Mans, but crashed during FP1 and felt too unwell to race.

== Racing record ==
=== Career summary ===
Season	Series	Team	Races	Wins	Poles	F/Laps	Podiums	Points	Position
2012	Asian Touring Car Series		1	0	0	0	0	0	23rd
2014	Chinese Racing Cup	HKAA	3	0	0	0	0	8	8th
2015	Clio Cup China Series - Class A		2	0	0	0	0	0	NC
2016	Clio Cup China Series - Class A		2	0	0	0	2	53	13th
2019	Kyojo Cup		1	0	0	0	0	0	14th
2022	Kyojo Cup	ALBA	1	0	0	0	0	0	25th
2025	F4 Chinese Championship	Champ Motorsport	4	0	0	0	0	0	31st
2026	Le Mans Cup - LMP3	Team Virage							
