= 2026 China GT Championship =

Chinese racing season

The 2026 Xiaomi CHINA GT Championship was the tenth season of the China GT Championship, an auto racing series for spec GT cars promoted by Top Speed. The five-event season started at the Shanghai International Circuit on 17 April and concluded at Sepang International Circuit on 8 November.

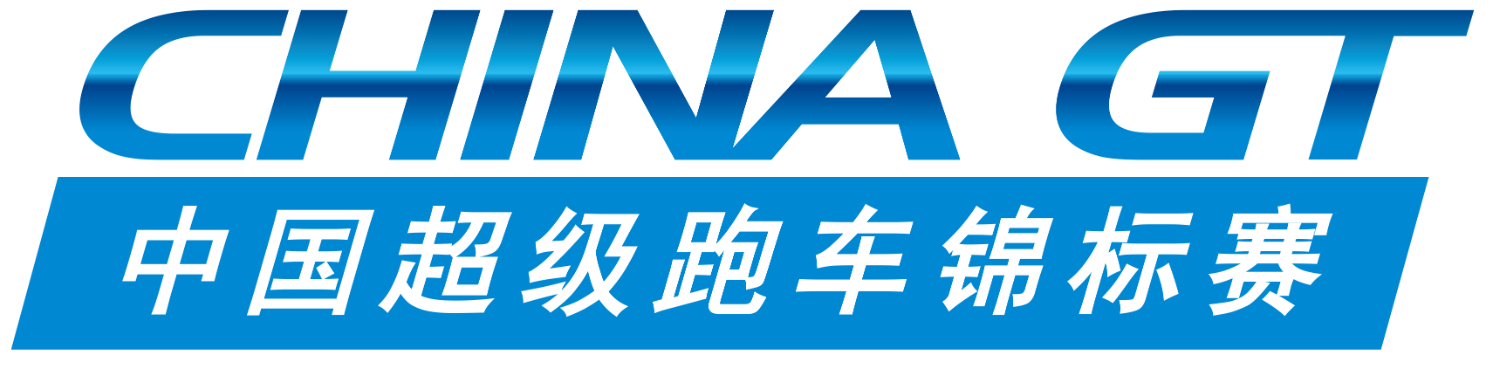
Official new logo of the China GT Championship (from 2026)

== Calendar ==
The provisional calendar for the 2026 season was announced on 4 March. An updated calendar confirming the date of the season-ending Sepang weekend, which was previously expected to be held on an unspecified date in December, was released on 16 March.

| Rnd | Circuit | Location | Date | Supporting | Location |
|---|---|---|---|---|---|
| 1 | (China) Shanghai International Circuit | Jiading District, Shanghai | 18–19 April | F4 Chinese Championship; Toyota Gazoo Racing China GR86 Cup | 2026 China GT Championship is located in Asia |
| 2 | (China) Ningbo International Circuit | Beilun District, Ningbo, Zhejiang | 23–24 May | Lamborghini Super Trofeo Asia | 2026 China GT Championship is located in Asia |
| 3 | (China) Zhuhai International Circuit | Xiangzhou District, Zhuhai, Guangdong | 25–26 July | Toyota Gazoo Racing China GR86 Cup | 2026 China GT Championship is located in Asia |
| 4 | (China) Shanghai International Circuit | Jiading District, Shanghai | 5–6 September | Lamborghini Super Trofeo Asia | 2026 China GT Championship is located in Asia |
| 5 | (Malaysia) Sepang International Circuit | Sepang, Selangor | 7–8 November | Formula Trophy Malaysia; Toyota Gazoo Racing GR86 Cup Series Malaysia | 2026 China GT Championship is located in Asia |

== Entries ==
| Entrant/Team | Chassis | Engine | No. | Drivers | Class | Rounds |
GT3
| (Macau) Elegant Racing Team | Mercedes-AMG GT3 Evo | Mercedes-AMG M159 6.2 L V8 | 3 | (Macau) Liu Lic Ka | PA | 1–2 |
| (Macau) Elegant Racing Team | Mercedes-AMG GT3 Evo | Mercedes-AMG M159 6.2 L V8 | 3 | (Germany) Tom Kalender | PA | 1 |
| (Macau) Elegant Racing Team | Mercedes-AMG GT3 Evo | Mercedes-AMG M159 6.2 L V8 | 3 | (Macau) Liu Weng Hin | PA | 2 |
| (Macau) Elegant Racing Team | Mercedes-AMG GT3 Evo | Mercedes-AMG M159 6.2 L V8 | 3 | (Macau) Liu Weng Hin | P | 3–4 |
| (Macau) Elegant Racing Team | Mercedes-AMG GT3 Evo | Mercedes-AMG M159 6.2 L V8 | 3 | (Finland) Elias Seppänen | P | 3 |
| (Macau) Elegant Racing Team | Mercedes-AMG GT3 Evo | Mercedes-AMG M159 6.2 L V8 | 3 | (Germany) Tom Kalender | P | 4 |
| (China) Level Motorsports | Mercedes-AMG GT3 Evo | Mercedes-AMG M159 6.2 L V8 | 15 | (Chinese Taipei) Chen Chun-hua | Am | All |
| (China) Level Motorsports | Mercedes-AMG GT3 Evo | Mercedes-AMG M159 6.2 L V8 | 15 | (China) Huang Ruohan | Am | All |
| (China) Level Motorsports | Audi R8 LMS Evo II | Audi DAR 5.2 L V10 | 26 | (Chinese Taipei) Jackson Chuang Chi-shun | Am | All |
| (China) Level Motorsports | Audi R8 LMS Evo II | Audi DAR 5.2 L V10 | 26 | (China) Su Yenming | Am | All |
| (China) / 610Racing (Note: Car No. 16, 97, 510, & 610 entered as 610Racing, No. 33 entered as TBC by 610Racing); (China) / TBC by 610Racing | Porsche 911 GT3 R (992.2) | Porsche M97/80 4.2 L Flat-6 | 16 | (China) Cao Qikuan | Am | All |
| (China) / 610Racing; (China) / TBC by 610Racing | Porsche 911 GT3 R (992.2) | Porsche M97/80 4.2 L Flat-6 | 16 | (China) Hu Bo | Am | All |
| (China) / 610Racing; (China) / TBC by 610Racing | Porsche 911 GT3 R (992.2) | Porsche M97/80 4.2 L Flat-6 | 97 | (China) Luo Kailuo | PA | All |
| (China) / 610Racing; (China) / TBC by 610Racing | Porsche 911 GT3 R (992.2) | Porsche M97/80 4.2 L Flat-6 | 97 | (China) Yang Haojie | PA | All |
| (China) / 610Racing; (China) / TBC by 610Racing | BMW M4 GT3 Evo | BMW P58 3.0 L Turbo I6 | 33 | (China) Yang Baijie | PA | 1–4 |
| (China) / 610Racing; (China) / TBC by 610Racing | BMW M4 GT3 Evo | BMW P58 3.0 L Turbo I6 | 33 | (China) Li Zhicong | PA | 1–2 |
| (China) / 610Racing; (China) / TBC by 610Racing | BMW M4 GT3 Evo | BMW P58 3.0 L Turbo I6 | 33 | (United States) Neil Verhagen | PA | 3–4 |
| (China) / 610Racing; (China) / TBC by 610Racing | Audi R8 LMS Evo II | Audi DAR 5.2 L V10 | 510 | (Chinese Taipei) Johnson Huang | M | 1, 4–5 |
| (China) / 610Racing; (China) / TBC by 610Racing | Audi R8 LMS Evo II | Audi DAR 5.2 L V10 | 510 | (Chinese Taipei) Johnson Huang | PA | 2–3 |
| (China) / 610Racing; (China) / TBC by 610Racing | Audi R8 LMS Evo II | Audi DAR 5.2 L V10 | 510 | (Chinese Taipei) Gavin Huang | PA | 2–3 |
| (China) / 610Racing; (China) / TBC by 610Racing | Audi R8 LMS Evo II | Audi DAR 5.2 L V10 | 610 | (China) Yang Xiaowei | Am | All |
| (China) / 610Racing; (China) / TBC by 610Racing | Audi R8 LMS Evo II | Audi DAR 5.2 L V10 | 610 | (China) Han Jingfeng | Am | 1 |
| (China) / 610Racing; (China) / TBC by 610Racing | Audi R8 LMS Evo II | Audi DAR 5.2 L V10 | 610 | (China) Li Lichao | Am | 2 |
| (China) / 610Racing; (China) / TBC by 610Racing | Audi R8 LMS Evo II | Audi DAR 5.2 L V10 | 610 | (Indonesia) Benny Santoso | Am | 3, 5 |
| (China) / 610Racing; (China) / TBC by 610Racing | Audi R8 LMS Evo II | Audi DAR 5.2 L V10 | 610 | (China) Steven Zhou | Am | 4 |
| (Indonesia) Delta Garage Racing | Porsche 911 GT3 R (992.2) | Porsche M97/80 4.2 L Flat-6 | 17 | (Malaysia) Putera Adam | PA | 5 |
| (Indonesia) Delta Garage Racing | Porsche 911 GT3 R (992.2) | Porsche M97/80 4.2 L Flat-6 | 17 | (Indonesia) Dypo Fitramadhan | PA | 5 |
| (Indonesia) Delta Garage Racing | Porsche 911 GT3 R (992) | Porsche M97/80 4.2 L Flat-6 | 86 | (Indonesia) Umar Basalamah | PA | 5 |
| (Indonesia) Delta Garage Racing | Porsche 911 GT3 R (992) | Porsche M97/80 4.2 L Flat-6 | 86 | (Serbia) Miloš Pavlović | PA | 5 |
| (China) Team KRC | BMW M4 GT3 Evo | BMW P58 3.0 L Turbo I6 | 18 | (China) Zhang Mingyang | PA | All |
| (China) Team KRC | BMW M4 GT3 Evo | BMW P58 3.0 L Turbo I6 | 18 | (China) Zhang Zhendong | PA | All |
| (China) Team KRC | BMW M4 GT3 Evo | BMW P58 3.0 L Turbo I6 | 89 | (China) Jiang Jiawei | Am | 1 |
| (China) Team KRC | BMW M4 GT3 Evo | BMW P58 3.0 L Turbo I6 | 89 | (Canada) Samantha Tan | Am | 1 |
| (China) Team KRC | BMW M4 GT3 Evo | BMW P58 3.0 L Turbo I6 | 89 | (China) Ruan Cunfan | Am | 3–4 |
| (China) Team KRC | BMW M4 GT3 Evo | BMW P58 3.0 L Turbo I6 | 89 | (China) Lu Wei | Am | 3 |
| (China) Team KRC | BMW M4 GT3 Evo | BMW P58 3.0 L Turbo I6 | 89 | (Chinese Taipei) Brian Lee | Am | 4 |
| (China) Harmony Racing | Ferrari 296 GT3 (3–4); Ferrari 296 GT3 Evo (5) | Ferrari F163CE 3.0 L Turbo V6 | 22 | (China) Liu Hangcheng | Am | 1 |
| (China) Harmony Racing | Ferrari 296 GT3 (3–4); Ferrari 296 GT3 Evo (5) | Ferrari F163CE 3.0 L Turbo V6 | 22 | (China) Min Heng | Am | 1 |
| (China) Harmony Racing | Ferrari 296 GT3 (3–4); Ferrari 296 GT3 Evo (5) | Ferrari F163CE 3.0 L Turbo V6 | 73 | (China) Chen Yechong | PA | 5 |
| (China) Harmony Racing | Ferrari 296 GT3 (3–4); Ferrari 296 GT3 Evo (5) | Ferrari F163CE 3.0 L Turbo V6 | 73 | (Hong Kong) Liu Kai Shun | PA | 5 |
| (China) Winhere Harmony Racing | Ferrari 296 GT3 (3–4); Ferrari 296 GT3 Evo (5) | Ferrari F163CE 3.0 L Turbo V6 | 37 | (China) David Chen Weian | PA | 4 |
| (China) Winhere Harmony Racing | Ferrari 296 GT3 (3–4); Ferrari 296 GT3 Evo (5) | Ferrari F163CE 3.0 L Turbo V6 | 37 | (China) Anthony Liu Xu | PA | 4 |
| (China) Apex Predator Harmony Racing | Ferrari 296 GT3 (3–4); Ferrari 296 GT3 Evo (5) | Ferrari F163CE 3.0 L Turbo V6 | 116 | (China) Zhang Huilin | PA | 1–3 |
| (China) Apex Predator Harmony Racing | Ferrari 296 GT3 (3–4); Ferrari 296 GT3 Evo (5) | Ferrari F163CE 3.0 L Turbo V6 | 116 | (Hong Kong) Liu Kai Shun | PA | 1–2 |
| (China) Apex Predator Harmony Racing | Ferrari 296 GT3 (3–4); Ferrari 296 GT3 Evo (5) | Ferrari F163CE 3.0 L Turbo V6 | 116 | (China) David Chen Weian | PA | 3 |
| (China) Apex Predator Racing | Ferrari 296 GT3 (3–4); Ferrari 296 GT3 Evo (5) | Ferrari F163CE 3.0 L Turbo V6 | 116 | (Germany) Dennis Marschall | PA | 4 |
| (China) Apex Predator Racing | Ferrari 296 GT3 (3–4); Ferrari 296 GT3 Evo (5) | Ferrari F163CE 3.0 L Turbo V6 | 116 | (China) Zhang Huilin | PA | 4 |
| (China) Apex Predator Racing | Audi R8 LMS Evo II | Audi DAR 5.2 L V10 | 99 | (China) Liu Haoze | P | 3–4 |
| (China) Apex Predator Racing | Audi R8 LMS Evo II | Audi DAR 5.2 L V10 | 99 | (China) Zhang Shimo | P | 3 |
| (China) Apex Predator Racing | Audi R8 LMS Evo II | Audi DAR 5.2 L V10 | 99 | (Vietnam) Sawer Hoàng Đạt | P | 4 |
| (China) Apex Predator Racing | Audi R8 LMS Evo II | Audi DAR 5.2 L V10 | 110 | (China) Han Jifeng | PA | 4 |
| (China) Apex Predator Racing | Audi R8 LMS Evo II | Audi DAR 5.2 L V10 | 110 | (China) He Guiming | PA | 4 |
| (Malaysia) 33R Harmony Racing | Audi R8 LMS Evo II | Audi DAR 5.2 L V10 | 68 | (China) Ray Wu | M | 1, 3–4 |
| (Malaysia) 33R Harmony Racing | Audi R8 LMS Evo II | Audi DAR 5.2 L V10 | 68 | (China) Xing Yanbin | M | 1, 3–4 |
| (Malaysia) 33R Harmony Racing | Audi R8 LMS Evo II | Audi DAR 5.2 L V10 | 68 | (China) Lu Zhiwei | PA | 2 |
| (Malaysia) 33R Harmony Racing | Audi R8 LMS Evo II | Audi DAR 5.2 L V10 | 68 | (China) Zhang Shimo | PA | 2 |
| (Hong Kong) Absolute Racing | Porsche 911 GT3 R (992.2) | Porsche M97/80 4.2 L Flat-6 | 22 | (China) Min Heng | Am | 2–5 |
| (Hong Kong) Absolute Racing | Porsche 911 GT3 R (992.2) | Porsche M97/80 4.2 L Flat-6 | 22 | (China) Liu Hangcheng | Am | 2–4 |
| (Hong Kong) Absolute Racing | Porsche 911 GT3 R (992.2) | Porsche M97/80 4.2 L Flat-6 | 22 | (China) Li Kerong | Am | 5 |
| (Hong Kong) Absolute Racing | Lamborghini Huracán GT3 Evo 2 | Lamborghini DGF 5.2 L V10 | 63 | (Malaysia) Akash Nandy | P | 1–2, 4–5 |
| (Hong Kong) Absolute Racing | Lamborghini Huracán GT3 Evo 2 | Lamborghini DGF 5.2 L V10 | 63 | (China) Liang Jiatong | P | 1–2, 5 |
| (Hong Kong) Absolute Racing | Lamborghini Huracán GT3 Evo 2 | Lamborghini DGF 5.2 L V10 | 63 | (Thailand) Sandy Stuvik | P | 4 |
| (Hong Kong) Absolute Racing | Lamborghini Huracán GT3 Evo 2 | Lamborghini DGF 5.2 L V10 | 63 | (China) Chen Yechong | PA | 3 |
| (Hong Kong) Absolute Racing | Lamborghini Huracán GT3 Evo 2 | Lamborghini DGF 5.2 L V10 | 63 | (China) Liang Jiatong | PA | 3 |
| (China) Incipient Racing | Audi R8 LMS Evo II | Audi DAR 5.2 L V10 | 51 | (China) Wang Wencheng | M | 1 |
| (China) Incipient Racing | Audi R8 LMS Evo II | Audi DAR 5.2 L V10 | 51 | (China) Xiao Min | M | 1 |
| (China) Aerion Racing by Incipient | Audi R8 LMS Evo II | Audi DAR 5.2 L V10 | 51 | (China) Xiao Min | M | 3–4 |
| (China) Aerion Racing by Incipient | Audi R8 LMS Evo II | Audi DAR 5.2 L V10 | 51 | (China) Chen Sitong | M | 3–4 |
| (China) Bad Guy Racing | Audi R8 LMS Evo II | Audi DAR 5.2 L V10 | 69 | (China) Daniel Lu | PA | 3 |
| (China) Bad Guy Racing | Audi R8 LMS Evo II | Audi DAR 5.2 L V10 | 69 | (China) Xu Zhefeng | PA | 3 |
| (China) Origine Motorsport | Porsche 911 GT3 R (992.2) | Porsche M97/80 4.2 L Flat-6 | 55 | (China) Gu Meng | PA | 2, 4–5 |
| (China) Origine Motorsport | Porsche 911 GT3 R (992.2) | Porsche M97/80 4.2 L Flat-6 | 55 | (China) Xie Xinzhe | PA | 2, 4–5 |
| (China) Origine Motorsport | Porsche 911 GT3 R (992.2) | Porsche M97/80 4.2 L Flat-6 | 55 | (China) Bao Jinlong | PA | 3 |
| (China) Origine Motorsport | Porsche 911 GT3 R (992.2) | Porsche M97/80 4.2 L Flat-6 | 55 | (China) Ling Kang | PA | 3 |
| (China) Winhere Origine Motorsport | Porsche 911 GT3 R (992.2) | Porsche M97/80 4.2 L Flat-6 | 96 | (China) Yuan Bo | PA | 1–3, 5 |
| (China) Winhere Origine Motorsport | Porsche 911 GT3 R (992.2) | Porsche M97/80 4.2 L Flat-6 | 96 | (China) Deng Yi | PA | 1 |
| (China) Winhere Origine Motorsport | Porsche 911 GT3 R (992.2) | Porsche M97/80 4.2 L Flat-6 | 96 | (China) Ye Hongli | PA | 2–5 |
| (China) Winhere Origine Motorsport | Porsche 911 GT3 R (992.2) | Porsche M97/80 4.2 L Flat-6 | 96 | (China) Lu Wei | PA | 4 |
| (China) Phantom Global Racing | Porsche 911 GT3 R (992.2) | Porsche M97/80 4.2 L Flat-6 | 66 | (China) Chris Chia On | PA | All |
| (China) Phantom Global Racing | Porsche 911 GT3 R (992.2) | Porsche M97/80 4.2 L Flat-6 | 66 | (Italy) Enzo Trulli | PA | All |
| (China) Phantom Global Racing | Porsche 911 GT3 R (992.2) | Porsche M97/80 4.2 L Flat-6 | 79 | (China) Li Ning | PA | All |
| (China) Phantom Global Racing | Porsche 911 GT3 R (992.2) | Porsche M97/80 4.2 L Flat-6 | 79 | (Germany) Nico Menzel | PA | 1 |
| (China) Phantom Global Racing | Porsche 911 GT3 R (992.2) | Porsche M97/80 4.2 L Flat-6 | 79 | (Netherlands) Loek Hartog | PA | 2–5 |
| (China) UNO Racing Team | Mercedes-AMG GT3 Evo | Mercedes-AMG M159 6.2 L V8 | 71 | (Hong Kong) "Rio" | PA | 1–2, 4 |
| (China) UNO Racing Team | Mercedes-AMG GT3 Evo | Mercedes-AMG M159 6.2 L V8 | 71 | (China) Chen Yechong | PA | 1 |
| (China) UNO Racing Team | Mercedes-AMG GT3 Evo | Mercedes-AMG M159 6.2 L V8 | 71 | (China) Bian Fengjun | PA | 2, 4 |
| (China) UNO Racing Team | Mercedes-AMG GT3 Evo | Mercedes-AMG M159 6.2 L V8 | 71 | (Hong Kong) "Rio" | P | 3 |
| (China) UNO Racing Team | Mercedes-AMG GT3 Evo | Mercedes-AMG M159 6.2 L V8 | 71 | (Hong Kong) Marchy Lee | P | 3 |
| (China) UNO Racing Team | Mercedes-AMG GT3 Evo | Mercedes-AMG M159 6.2 L V8 | 85 | (Malaysia) Melvin Moh | Am | 1, 3–4 |
| (China) UNO Racing Team | Mercedes-AMG GT3 Evo | Mercedes-AMG M159 6.2 L V8 | 85 | (China) Wang Yibo | Am | 1, 3–4 |
| (China) UNO Racing Team | Mercedes-AMG GT3 Evo | Mercedes-AMG M159 6.2 L V8 | 585 | (Malaysia) Melvin Moh | Am | 5 |
| (China) UNO Racing Team | Mercedes-AMG GT3 Evo | Mercedes-AMG M159 6.2 L V8 | 585 | (China) Wang Yibo | Am | 5 |
| (China) UNO Racing Team | Mercedes-AMG GT3 Evo (2); Audi R8 LMS Evo II (3) | Mercedes-AMG M159 6.2 L V8 (2); Audi DAR 5.2 L V10 (3) | 98 | (Hong Kong) Adderly Fong | PA | 2–3 |
| (China) UNO Racing Team | Mercedes-AMG GT3 Evo (2); Audi R8 LMS Evo II (3) | Mercedes-AMG M159 6.2 L V8 (2); Audi DAR 5.2 L V10 (3) | 98 | (China) Song Yiran | PA | 2–3 |
| (Chinese Taipei) FIST Team AAI | Ferrari 296 GT3 Evo | Ferrari F163CE 3.0 L Turbo V6 | 90 | (China) Lin Yu | PA | 1–4 |
| (Chinese Taipei) FIST Team AAI | Ferrari 296 GT3 Evo | Ferrari F163CE 3.0 L Turbo V6 | 90 | (Italy) Lorenzo Patrese | PA | 1–4 |
| (Chinese Taipei) FIST Team AAI | BMW M4 GT3 Evo (1); Ferrari 296 GT3 Evo (3–4) | BMW P58 3.0 L Turbo I6 (1); Ferrari F163CE 3.0 L Turbo V6 (3–4) | 91 | (Chinese Taipei) Chen Yin-yu | PA | 1, 3–4 |
| (Chinese Taipei) FIST Team AAI | BMW M4 GT3 Evo (1); Ferrari 296 GT3 Evo (3–4) | BMW P58 3.0 L Turbo I6 (1); Ferrari F163CE 3.0 L Turbo V6 (3–4) | 91 | (United Kingdom) Ollie Millroy | PA | 1, 3–4 |
| (China) Yunnan Zhuoyi Speed SR Team | Lamborghini Huracán GT3 Evo 2 | Lamborghini DGF 5.2 L V10 | 181 | (China) Shi Wei | Am | 4 |
| (China) Yunnan Zhuoyi Speed SR Team | Lamborghini Huracán GT3 Evo 2 | Lamborghini DGF 5.2 L V10 | 181 | (China) Xu Benyang | Am | 4 |
| (China) GAHA Racing | BMW M4 GT3 Evo | BMW P58 3.0 L Turbo I6 | 328 | (China) Li Hanyu | Am | All |
| (China) GAHA Racing | BMW M4 GT3 Evo | BMW P58 3.0 L Turbo I6 | 328 | (China) Ou Ziyang | Am | All |
| (China) 326 Racing Team | Audi R8 LMS Evo II | Audi DAR 5.2 L V10 | 511 | (China) Wu Yifan | Am | All |
| (China) 326 Racing Team | Audi R8 LMS Evo II | Audi DAR 5.2 L V10 | 511 | (China) Liu Zichen | Am | 1–4 |
| (China) Climax Racing | Ferrari 296 GT3 Evo | Ferrari F163CE 3.0 L Turbo V6 | 710 | (China) Chen Fangping | PA | 1, 4 |
| (China) Climax Racing | Ferrari 296 GT3 Evo | Ferrari F163CE 3.0 L Turbo V6 | 710 | (Finland) Elias Seppänen | PA | 1, 4 |
| (China) Climax Racing | Audi R8 LMS Evo II | Audi DAR 5.2 L V10 | 777 | (China) Li Donghui | Am | All |
| (China) Climax Racing | Audi R8 LMS Evo II | Audi DAR 5.2 L V10 | 777 | (China) Li Dongsheng | Am | All |
| (China) Climax Racing | Mercedes-AMG GT3 Evo | Mercedes-AMG M159 6.2 L V8 | 999 | (China) Zhou Bihuang | PA | 1–2, 5 |
| (China) Climax Racing | Mercedes-AMG GT3 Evo | Mercedes-AMG M159 6.2 L V8 | 999 | (Australia) Bayley Hall | PA | 1–2 |
| (China) Climax Racing | Mercedes-AMG GT3 Evo | Mercedes-AMG M159 6.2 L V8 | 999 | (China) Yuanpu Cui | PA | 5 |
| (China) Milwaukee by Climax Racing | Mercedes-AMG GT3 Evo | Mercedes-AMG M159 6.2 L V8 | 999 | (China) Zhou Bihuang | PA | 3–4 |
| (China) Milwaukee by Climax Racing | Mercedes-AMG GT3 Evo | Mercedes-AMG M159 6.2 L V8 | 999 | (Australia) Bayley Hall | PA | 3–4 |
GTC & 992 Cup (Note: The 2026 season is set to see the introduction of the 992 Cup class, contested exclusively by the 992.1-spec Porsche 911 GT3 Cup chassis.)
| (China) Climax Racing | Ferrari 296 Challenge | Ferrari F163CE 3.0 L Turbo V6 | 6 | (Belgium) Mathieu Detry | PA | 4 |
| (China) Climax Racing | Ferrari 296 Challenge | Ferrari F163CE 3.0 L Turbo V6 | 6 | (China) Wu Hankai | PA | 4 |
| (China) Climax Racing | Porsche 911 GT3 Cup (992.1) | Porsche 4.0 L Flat-6 | 8 | (Malaysia) Lim Junji | Am | 5 |
| (China) Climax Racing | Porsche 911 GT3 Cup (992.1) | Porsche 4.0 L Flat-6 | 8 | (Malaysia) Lim Yunhao | Am | 5 |
| (China) Harmony Racing | Ferrari 296 Challenge | Ferrari F163CE 3.0 L Turbo V6 | 23 | (China) Feng Shaolun | Am | 1, 3–5 |
| (China) Harmony Racing | Ferrari 296 Challenge | Ferrari F163CE 3.0 L Turbo V6 | 23 | (China) Huang Xiaofeng | Am | 1, 3 |
| (China) Harmony Racing | Ferrari 296 Challenge | Ferrari F163CE 3.0 L Turbo V6 | 23 | (China) Jiang Nan | Am | 4–5 |
| (China) 610Racing | Porsche 911 GT3 Cup (992.1) | Porsche 4.0 L Flat-6 | 27 | (China) Yan Chuang | Am | All |
| (China) 610Racing | Porsche 911 GT3 Cup (992.1) | Porsche 4.0 L Flat-6 | 27 | (Singapore) Roy Tien Foo Tang | Am | 4 |
| (China) 610Racing | Porsche 911 GT3 Cup (992.1) | Porsche 4.0 L Flat-6 | 29 | (China) Wang Yang | Am | All |
| (China) 610Racing | Porsche 911 GT3 Cup (992.1) | Porsche 4.0 L Flat-6 | 29 | (Singapore) Roy Tien Foo Tang | Am | 1 |
| (China) 610Racing | Porsche 911 GT3 Cup (992.1) | Porsche 4.0 L Flat-6 | 29 | (China) Gan Erfu | Am | 2–5 |
| (China) 610Racing | Porsche 911 GT3 Cup (992.1) | Porsche 4.0 L Flat-6 | 53 | (United States) Hana Burton | PA | 1–2 |
| (China) 610Racing | Porsche 911 GT3 Cup (992.1) | Porsche 4.0 L Flat-6 | 53 | (China) Kristie Zhu | PA | 1 |
| (China) 610Racing | Porsche 911 GT3 Cup (992.1) | Porsche 4.0 L Flat-6 | 53 | (China) Shi Wei | PA | 2 |
| (China) 610Racing | Porsche 911 GT3 Cup (992.1) | Porsche 4.0 L Flat-6 | 53 | (China) Yang Baijie | PA | 3 |
| (China) 610Racing | Porsche 911 GT3 Cup (992.1) | Porsche 4.0 L Flat-6 | 53 | (Hong Kong) Dylan Yip | PA | 3 |
| (China) 610Racing | Porsche 911 GT3 Cup (992.1) | Porsche 4.0 L Flat-6 | 53 | (Singapore) Kenneth Chong Yi Ho | Am | 5 |
| (China) 610Racing | Porsche 911 GT3 Cup (992.1) | Porsche 4.0 L Flat-6 | 53 | (Singapore) Roy Tien Foo Tang | Am | 5 |
| (China) 610Racing | Porsche 911 GT3 Cup (992.1) | Porsche 4.0 L Flat-6 | 77 | (China) He Xiaole | P | 1–2 |
| (China) 610Racing | Porsche 911 GT3 Cup (992.1) | Porsche 4.0 L Flat-6 | 77 | (China) Tian Xu | P | 1 |
| (China) 610Racing | Porsche 911 GT3 Cup (992.1) | Porsche 4.0 L Flat-6 | 77 | (China) Yuan Runqi | P | 2 |
| (China) 610Racing | Porsche 911 GT3 Cup (992.1) | Porsche 4.0 L Flat-6 | 77 | (China) He Xiaole | PA | 3–5 |
| (China) 610Racing | Porsche 911 GT3 Cup (992.1) | Porsche 4.0 L Flat-6 | 77 | (China) Tian Xu | PA | 3–5 |
| (China) 610Racing | Porsche 911 GT3 Cup (992.1) | Porsche 4.0 L Flat-6 | 993 | (China) Cui Yue | PA | 1, 4 |
| (China) 610Racing | Porsche 911 GT3 Cup (992.1) | Porsche 4.0 L Flat-6 | 993 | (China) Liu Chao | PA | 1, 4 |
| (China) Xietaitai Racing Team BJ One Motorsports | Lamborghini Huracán Super Trofeo Evo | Lamborghini DGF 5.2 L V10 | 94 | (China) Dai Yuhao | PA | 1 |
| (China) Xietaitai Racing Team BJ One Motorsports | Lamborghini Huracán Super Trofeo Evo | Lamborghini DGF 5.2 L V10 | 94 | (China) Ye Zhe | PA | 1 |
| (China) Frankenstein Racing | Lamborghini Huracán Super Trofeo Evo2 | Lamborghini DGF 5.2 L V10 | 222 | (China) Liu Taiji | Am | 3 |
| (China) Frankenstein Racing | Lamborghini Huracán Super Trofeo Evo2 | Lamborghini DGF 5.2 L V10 | 222 | (China) Zhou Yiran | Am | 3 |
| (China) Origin7 Racing | Porsche 911 GT3 Cup (992.1) | Porsche 4.0 L Flat-6 | 711 | (China) Kim Hung Il | Am | 5 |
| (China) Origin7 Racing | Porsche 911 GT3 Cup (992.1) | Porsche 4.0 L Flat-6 | 711 | (Canada) Alexander Paquette | Am | 5 |
| (China) 027 Premium Garage by Z.Speed | Porsche 911 GT3 Cup (992.1) | Porsche 4.0 L Flat-6 | 888 | (China) Jiang Nan | Am | 1 |
| (China) 027 Premium Garage by Z.Speed | Porsche 911 GT3 Cup (992.1) | Porsche 4.0 L Flat-6 | 888 | (China) Tang Zihao | Am | 1 |
| (China) CTF Racing | Ferrari 296 Challenge | Ferrari F163CE 3.0 L Turbo V6 | 888 | (China) Jiang Yufan | Am | 4 |
| (China) CTF Racing | Ferrari 296 Challenge | Ferrari F163CE 3.0 L Turbo V6 | 888 | (China) Zhang Yaqi | Am | 4 |
| (China) Phantom Global Racing | Porsche 911 GT3 Cup (992.1) | Porsche 4.0 L Flat-6 | 915 | (China) Pan Deng | Am | 1 |
| (China) Phantom Global Racing | Porsche 911 GT3 Cup (992.1) | Porsche 4.0 L Flat-6 | 915 | (China) Zhang Meng | Am | 1 |
GTS (SRO GT4)
| (China) Climax Racing | Porsche 718 Cayman GT4 RS Clubsport (982) | Porsche MDG.GA 4.0 L Flat-6 | 6 | (Belgium) Mathieu Detry | PA | 1 |
| (China) Climax Racing | Porsche 718 Cayman GT4 RS Clubsport (982) | Porsche MDG.GA 4.0 L Flat-6 | 6 | (China) Wu Hankai | PA | 1 |
| (China) Climax Racing | Porsche 718 Cayman GT4 RS Clubsport (982) | Porsche MDG.GA 4.0 L Flat-6 | 611 | (Finland) Elias Seppänen | PA | 5 |
| (China) Climax Racing | Porsche 718 Cayman GT4 RS Clubsport (982) | Porsche MDG.GA 4.0 L Flat-6 | 611 | (China) Xu Xin | PA | 5 |
| Toyota Gazoo Racing China | Toyota GR Supra GT4 Evo2 | Toyota B58H 3.0 L Turbo I6 | 7 | (China) Yu Rao | Am | 1, 3 |
| Toyota Gazoo Racing China | Toyota GR Supra GT4 Evo2 | Toyota B58H 3.0 L Turbo I6 | 21 | (China) Wang Hao | Am | 1 |
| Toyota Gazoo Racing China | Toyota GR Supra GT4 Evo2 | Toyota B58H 3.0 L Turbo I6 | 21 | (China) Huang Kuisheng | Am | 1 |
| Toyota Gazoo Racing China | Toyota GR Supra GT4 Evo2 | Toyota B58H 3.0 L Turbo I6 | 315 | (China) Huang Kuisheng | PA | 3 |
| Toyota Gazoo Racing China | Toyota GR Supra GT4 Evo2 | Toyota B58H 3.0 L Turbo I6 | 315 | (China) Han Lichao | PA | 1, 3 |
| Toyota Gazoo Racing China | Toyota GR Supra GT4 Evo2 | Toyota B58H 3.0 L Turbo I6 | 315 | (China) Huang Ruohan | PA | 1 |
| (China) EMO Racing | Porsche 718 Cayman GT4 RS Clubsport | Porsche MDG.GA 4.0 L Flat-6 | 10 | (China) Jiang Ruxi | PA | 1, 3–4 |
| (China) EMO Racing | Porsche 718 Cayman GT4 RS Clubsport | Porsche MDG.GA 4.0 L Flat-6 | 10 | (China) Liang Qinglin | PA | 1, 3–4 |
| (China) Starcars Racing | Mercedes-AMG GT4 | Mercedes-AMG M178 4.0 L Turbo V8 | 28 | (Singapore) Dennis Joon Ming Chan | Am | 1, 3–5 |
| (China) Starcars Racing | Mercedes-AMG GT4 | Mercedes-AMG M178 4.0 L Turbo V8 | 28 | (China) Ouyang Zhenwei | Am | 1, 3–5 |
| (China) KS by Pointer Racing | Mercedes-AMG GT4 | Mercedes-AMG M178 4.0 L Turbo V8 | 56 | (China) Huang Hui | Am | 1–5 |
| (China) KS by Pointer Racing | Mercedes-AMG GT4 | Mercedes-AMG M178 4.0 L Turbo V8 | 56 | (Hong Kong) Lo Kwan Kit | Am | 2 |
| (China) KS by Pointer Racing | Mercedes-AMG GT4 | Mercedes-AMG M178 4.0 L Turbo V8 | 56 | (China) Huang Weibo | Am | 4 |
| (China) Xietaitai Racing Team BJ One Motorsports | BMW M4 GT4 Evo (G82) | BMW S58B30T0 3.0 L Turbo I6 | 57 | (China) Jing Zefeng | Am | 1, 3 |
| (China) Xietaitai Racing Team BJ One Motorsports | BMW M4 GT4 Evo (G82) | BMW S58B30T0 3.0 L Turbo I6 | 57 | (China) Pan Yiming | Am | 1, 3 |
| (China) Xietaitai Racing Team BJ One Motorsports | BMW M4 GT4 Evo (G82) | BMW S58B30T0 3.0 L Turbo I6 | 714 | (China) Pan Yiming | Am | 2 |
| (China) Xietaitai Racing Team BJ One Motorsports | BMW M4 GT4 Evo (G82) | BMW S58B30T0 3.0 L Turbo I6 | 714 | (China) Ye Sichao | Am | 2 |
| (China) Xietaitai Racing Team BJ One Motorsports | BMW M4 GT4 Evo (G82) | BMW S58B30T0 3.0 L Turbo I6 | 789 | (China) Jing Zefeng | Am | 4 |
| (China) Xietaitai Racing Team BJ One Motorsports | BMW M4 GT4 Evo (G82) | BMW S58B30T0 3.0 L Turbo I6 | 789 | (China) Pan Yiming | Am | 4 |
| (China) Team KRC | BMW M4 GT4 Evo (G82) | BMW S58B30T0 3.0 L Turbo I6 | 58 | (China) Ruan Cunfan | PA | 1 |
| (China) Team KRC | BMW M4 GT4 Evo (G82) | BMW S58B30T0 3.0 L Turbo I6 | 58 | (Chinese Taipei) Ethan Ho | PA | 1 |
| (China) Team KRC | BMW M4 GT4 Evo (G82) | BMW S58B30T0 3.0 L Turbo I6 | 58 | (Chinese Taipei) Ethan Ho | P | 2–4 |
| (China) Phantom Global Racing | Porsche 718 Cayman GT4 RS Clubsport (982) | Porsche MDG.GA 4.0 L Flat-6 | 86 | (China) Li Kerong | PA | 4 |
| (China) Phantom Global Racing | Porsche 718 Cayman GT4 RS Clubsport (982) | Porsche MDG.GA 4.0 L Flat-6 | 86 | (Hong Kong) Daniel Wu | PA | 4 |
| (China) Mogan Team Trackday King | Toyota GR Supra GT4 Evo2 | Toyota B58H 3.0 L Turbo I6 | 88 | (Hong Kong) Chan Ka Ping | Am | 4 |
| (China) Mogan Team Trackday King | Toyota GR Supra GT4 Evo2 | Toyota B58H 3.0 L Turbo I6 | 88 | (China) Eason Wu | Am | 4 |
| (China) SDR Racing | Porsche 718 Cayman GT4 RS Clubsport (982) | Porsche MDG.GA 4.0 L Flat-6 | 111 | (China) Liu Sen | Am | 1–4 |
| (China) SDR Racing | Porsche 718 Cayman GT4 RS Clubsport (982) | Porsche MDG.GA 4.0 L Flat-6 | 111 | (China) Tian Feng | Am | 1, 3–4 |
| (China) Zhongshan SRC | BMW M4 GT4 (F82) | BMW S58B30T0 3.0 L Turbo I6 | 123 | (China) Wang Zifan | Am | 4 |
| (China) Only Racing Team | Porsche 718 Cayman GT4 RS Clubsport (982) | Porsche MDG.GA 4.0 L Flat-6 | 140 | (China) Bin Zejing | P | 4 |
| (China) Only Racing Team | Porsche 718 Cayman GT4 RS Clubsport (982) | Porsche MDG.GA 4.0 L Flat-6 | 140 | (China) Zu Haochen | P | 4 |
| (China) 326 Racing Team | Audi R8 LMS GT4 Evo | Audi DAR 5.2 L V10 | 326 | Vladimir Lobachev (Note: Lobachev is Russian, but compete as neutral competitor as Russian national emblems were banned by the FIA following the Russian invasion of Ukraine.) | PA | 4 |
| (China) 326 Racing Team | Audi R8 LMS GT4 Evo | Audi DAR 5.2 L V10 | 326 | (China) Xu Keming | PA | 4 |
| (China) 326 Racing Team | Audi R8 LMS GT4 Evo | Audi DAR 5.2 L V10 | 514 | (China) He Baifeng | Am | 1 |
| (China) 326 Racing Team | Audi R8 LMS GT4 Evo | Audi DAR 5.2 L V10 | 514 | (China) Lu Yiqin | Am | 1 |
| (China) 326 Racing Team | Audi R8 LMS GT4 Evo | Audi DAR 5.2 L V10 | 514 | (China) Li Jiahao | PA | 3 |
| (China) 326 Racing Team | Audi R8 LMS GT4 Evo | Audi DAR 5.2 L V10 | 514 | Vladimir Lobachev | PA | 3 |
| (China) GAHA Racing | Aston Martin Vantage AMR GT4 Evo | Aston Martin M177 4.0 L Turbo V8 | 418 | (China) Chen Shugang | Am | 1 |
| (China) GAHA Racing | Aston Martin Vantage AMR GT4 Evo | Aston Martin M177 4.0 L Turbo V8 | 418 | (China) Hu Haoheng | Am | 1 |
| (China) GAHA Racing | Aston Martin Vantage AMR GT4 Evo | Aston Martin M177 4.0 L Turbo V8 | 678 | (China) Yang Yiyan | PA | 4 |
| (China) GAHA Racing | Aston Martin Vantage AMR GT4 Evo | Aston Martin M177 4.0 L Turbo V8 | 678 | (China) Ye Sichao | PA | 4 |
| (China) RevX Racing | BMW M4 GT4 Evo (G82) | BMW S58B30T0 3.0 L Turbo I6 | 521 | (Chinese Taipei) Chang Chien-shang | PA | 1–4 |
| (China) RevX Racing | BMW M4 GT4 Evo (G82) | BMW S58B30T0 3.0 L Turbo I6 | 521 | (China) Wang Yimin | PA | 1–4 |
| (China) Level Motorsports | Mercedes-AMG GT4 | Mercedes-AMG M178 4.0 L Turbo V8 | 558 | (Chinese Taipei) Tsai Chang-ta | PA | 4 |
| (China) Level Motorsports | Mercedes-AMG GT4 | Mercedes-AMG M178 4.0 L Turbo V8 | 558 | (Italy) Massimiliano Wiser | PA | 4 |
| (China) Autohome Racing Team by CRS Racing | KTM X-Bow GT4 Evo | Audi EA888 2.0 Turbo I4 | 601 | (China) Liang Qi | Am | 1–2, 4 |
| (China) Autohome Racing Team by CRS Racing | KTM X-Bow GT4 Evo | Audi EA888 2.0 Turbo I4 | 601 | (China) Wang Tao | Am | 1–2, 4 |
| (China) Autohome Racing Team by CRS Racing | KTM X-Bow GT4 Evo | Audi EA888 2.0 Turbo I4 | 601 | (China) Qi Yu | Am | 3 |
| (China) Autohome Racing Team by CRS Racing | KTM X-Bow GT4 Evo | Audi EA888 2.0 Turbo I4 | 601 | (China) Zhang Zhiyi | Am | 3 |
| (China) Origin7 Racing | Porsche 718 Cayman GT4 RS Clubsport (982) | Porsche MDG.GA 4.0 L Flat-6 | 621 | (China) Jiang Tengyi | P | 4–5 |
| (China) Origin7 Racing | Porsche 718 Cayman GT4 RS Clubsport (982) | Porsche MDG.GA 4.0 L Flat-6 | 621 | (China) Tang Yile | P | 4–5 |
| (China) Origin7 Racing | Porsche 718 Cayman GT4 RS Clubsport (982) | Porsche MDG.GA 4.0 L Flat-6 | 977 | (China) Lenny Tian Weiyuan | PA | All |
| (China) Origin7 Racing | Porsche 718 Cayman GT4 RS Clubsport (982) | Porsche MDG.GA 4.0 L Flat-6 | 977 | (United Kingdom) Georgi Dimitrov | PA | 1 |
| (China) Origin7 Racing | Porsche 718 Cayman GT4 RS Clubsport (982) | Porsche MDG.GA 4.0 L Flat-6 | 977 | (France) Ethan Gialdini | PA | 2 |
| (China) Origin7 Racing | Porsche 718 Cayman GT4 RS Clubsport (982) | Porsche MDG.GA 4.0 L Flat-6 | 977 | (Thailand) Kantadhee Kusiri | PA | 3 |
| (China) Origin7 Racing | Porsche 718 Cayman GT4 RS Clubsport (982) | Porsche MDG.GA 4.0 L Flat-6 | 977 | (Malaysia) Naquib Azlan | PA | 4–5 |
| (China) Racing Panda | Porsche 718 Cayman GT4 RS Clubsport (982) | Porsche MDG.GA 4.0 L Flat-6 | 650 | (China) Che Shaoyi | Am | 1 |
| (China) Racing Panda | Porsche 718 Cayman GT4 RS Clubsport (982) | Porsche MDG.GA 4.0 L Flat-6 | 650 | (China) Archer Wu | Am | 1 |
| (China) Origine Motorsport | Porsche 718 Cayman GT4 RS Clubsport (982) (1); Toyota GR Supra GT4 Evo2 (3–5) | Porsche MDG.GA 4.0 L Flat-6 (1); Toyota B58H 3.0 L Turbo I6 (3–5) | 650 | (China) Che Shaoyi | Am | 2–5 |
| (China) Origine Motorsport | Porsche 718 Cayman GT4 RS Clubsport (982) (1); Toyota GR Supra GT4 Evo2 (3–5) | Porsche MDG.GA 4.0 L Flat-6 (1); Toyota B58H 3.0 L Turbo I6 (3–5) | 650 | (China) Archer Wu | Am | 2–5 |
| (China) Ultimate Racing | Porsche 718 Cayman GT4 RS Clubsport (982) | Porsche MDG.GA 4.0 L Flat-6 | 718 | (China) Zhang Banggui | Am | 1–4 |
| (China) Ultimate Racing | Porsche 718 Cayman GT4 RS Clubsport (982) | Porsche MDG.GA 4.0 L Flat-6 | 718 | (China) Zhang Wenyan | Am | 1–4 |
| (China) DTM Racing | Toyota GR Supra GT4 Evo2 | Toyota B58H 3.0 L Turbo I6 | 810 | (China) Wang Haosen | Am | 1–4 |
| (China) DTM Racing | Toyota GR Supra GT4 Evo2 | Toyota B58H 3.0 L Turbo I6 | 810 | (China) Liu Ci | Am | 1 |
| (China) DTM Racing | Toyota GR Supra GT4 Evo2 | Toyota B58H 3.0 L Turbo I6 | 810 | (China) Huang Ruohan | Am | 2 |
| (China) DTM Racing | Toyota GR Supra GT4 Evo2 | Toyota B58H 3.0 L Turbo I6 | 810 | (Hong Kong) Smart Tse | Am | 3–4 |
| (China) DTM Racing | Toyota GR Supra GT4 Evo2 | Toyota B58H 3.0 L Turbo I6 | 910 | (China) Ren Tingyi | Am | 1–4 |
| (China) DTM Racing | Toyota GR Supra GT4 Evo2 | Toyota B58H 3.0 L Turbo I6 | 910 | (China) Wang Honghao | Am | 1–4 |
| (Germany) Maxmore W&S Motorsport | Porsche 718 Cayman GT4 RS Clubsport (982) | Porsche MDG.GA 4.0 L Flat-6 | 927 | (Germany) Moritz Berrenberg | Am | 1, 3 |
| (Germany) Maxmore W&S Motorsport | Porsche 718 Cayman GT4 RS Clubsport (982) | Porsche MDG.GA 4.0 L Flat-6 | 927 | (Germany) Moritz Berrenberg | PA | 4 |
| (Germany) Maxmore W&S Motorsport | Porsche 718 Cayman GT4 RS Clubsport (982) | Porsche MDG.GA 4.0 L Flat-6 | 927 | (Italy) Enzo Trulli | PA | 4 |

GT3, GTC & GTS entries
| Icon | Class |
|---|---|
| P | Pro |
| PA | Pro-Am |
| Am | Am |
| M | Master |
GTC 992 entries
| Icon | Class |
| P | GTC 992-Pro |
| PA | GTC 992-ProAm |
| Am | GTC 992-Am |

== Results ==
Bold indicates the overall winner.

=== GT3 ===
| Rnd. | | Circuit | Pole position | Pro winners | Pro-Am winners | Am winners | Master winners |
|---|---|---|---|---|---|---|---|
| 1 | 1 | (China) Shanghai | (China) No. 96 Winhere Origine Motorsport | (Hong Kong) No. 63 Absolute Racing | **(China) No. 96 Winhere Origine Motorsport** | (China) No. 38 Team KRC | (China) No. 510 610Racing |
| 1 | 1 | (China) Shanghai | (China) Deng Yi (China) Yuan Bo | (China) Liang Jiatong (Malaysia) Akash Nandy | **(China) Deng Yi** **(China) Yuan Bo** | (China) Jiang Jiawei (Canada) Samantha Tan | (Chinese Taipei) Johnson Huang |
| 1 | 2 | (China) Shanghai | (China) No. 96 Winhere Origine Motorsport | (Hong Kong) No. 63 Absolute Racing | **(China) No. 999 Climax Racing** | (China) No. 328 GAHA Racing | (Malaysia) No. 68 33R Harmony Racing |
| 1 | 2 | (China) Shanghai | (China) Deng Yi (China) Yuan Bo | (China) Liang Jiatong (Malaysia) Akash Nandy | **(Australia) Bayley Hall** **(China) Zhou Bihuang** | (China) Ou Ziyang (China) Li Hanyu | (China) Ray Wu (China) Xing Yanbin |
| 2 | 1 | (China) Ningbo | (China) No. 96 Winhere Origine Motorsport | (Hong Kong) No. 63 Absolute Racing | **(China) No. 96 Winhere Origine Motorsport** | (China) No. 610 610Racing | No entries |
| 2 | 1 | (China) Ningbo | (China) Ye Hongli (China) Yuan Bo | (China) Liang Jiatong (Malaysia) Akash Nandy | **(China) Ye Hongli** **(China) Yuan Bo** | (China) Li Lichao (China) Yang Xiaowei | No entries |
| 2 | 2 | (China) Ningbo | (China) No. 96 Winhere Origine Motorsport | (Hong Kong) No. 63 Absolute Racing | **(China) No. 96 Winhere Origine Motorsport** | (China) No. 328 GAHA Racing | No entries |
| 2 | 2 | (China) Ningbo | (China) Ye Hongli (China) Yuan Bo | (China) Liang Jiatong (Malaysia) Akash Nandy | **(China) Ye Hongli** **(China) Yuan Bo** | (China) Ou Ziyang (China) Li Hanyu | No entries |
| 3 | 1 | (China) Zhuhai | (Chinese Taipei) No. 90 FIST Team AAI | Race canceled due to Typhoon Noul. | | | |
| 3 | 1 | (China) Zhuhai | (China) Lin Yu (Italy) Lorenzo Patrese | Race canceled due to Typhoon Noul. | | | |
| 3 | 2 | (China) Zhuhai | (China) No. 71 Uno Racing team | (Macau) No. 3 Elegant Racing Team | **(China) No. 96 Winhere Origine Motorsport** | (China) No. 89 Team KRC | (China) No. 51 Aerion Racing by Incipient |
| 3 | 2 | (China) Zhuhai | (Hong Kong) "Rio" (Hong Kong) Marchy Lee | (Macau) Liu Weng Hin (Finland) Elias Seppänen | **(China) Ye Hongli** **(China) Yuan Bo** | (China) Lu Wei (China) Ruan Cunfan | (China) Chen Sitong (China) Xiao Min |
| 4 | 1 | (China) Shanghai | (China) No. 116 Apex Predator Racing | (Macau) No. 3 Elegant Racing Team | **(China) No. 116 Apex Predator Racing** | (China) No. 85 UNO Racing Team | (China) No. 110 610Racing |
| 4 | 1 | (China) Shanghai | (Germany) Dennis Marschall (China) Zhang Huilin | (Macau) Liu Weng Hin (Germany) Tom Kalender | **(Germany) Dennis Marschall** **(China) Zhang Huilin** | (Malaysia) Melvin Moh (China) Wang Yibo | (Chinese Taipei) Johnson Huang |
| 4 | 2 | (China) Shanghai | (China) No. 37 Winhere Harmony Racing | **(Hong Kong) No. 63 Absolute Racing** | (China) No. 96 Winhere Origine Motorsport | (China) No. 89 Team KRC | (China) No. 110 610Racing |
| 4 | 2 | (China) Shanghai | (China) David Chen Weian (China) Anthony Liu Xu | **(Malaysia) Akash Nandy** **(Thailand) Sandy Stuvik** | (China) Lu Wei (China) Ye Hongli | (Chinese Taipei) Brian Lee (China) Ruan Cunfan | (Chinese Taipei) Johnson Huang |
| 5 | 1 | (Malaysia) Sepang | (China) No. 73 Harmony Racing | **(China) No. 96 Winhere Origine Motorsport** | **(China) No. 96 Winhere Origine Motorsport** | (China) No. 328 GAHA Racing | (China) No. 110 610Racing |
| 5 | 1 | (Malaysia) Sepang | (China) Chen Yechong (Hong Kong) Liu Kai Shun | **(China) Ye Hongli** **(China) Yuan Bo** | **(China) Ye Hongli** **(China) Yuan Bo** | (China) Ou Ziyang (China) Li Hanyu | (Chinese Taipei) Johnson Huang |
| 5 | 2 | (Malaysia) Sepang | (Hong Kong) No. 63 Absolute Racing | | | | |
| 5 | 2 | (Malaysia) Sepang | (China) Liang Jiatong (Malaysia) Akash Nandy | | | | |
| 5 | 3 | (Malaysia) Sepang | | | | | |

=== GTC & GTS ===
| Round | | Circuit | GTC Pole position | GTC winners | GTC 992 winners | GTS Pole position | GTS Pro winners | GTS Pro-Am winners | GTS Am winners |
|---|---|---|---|---|---|---|---|---|---|
| 1 | 1 | (China) Shanghai | (China) No. 23 Harmony Racing | **(China) No. 23 Harmony Racing** | (China) No. 27 610Racing | No. 315 Toyota Gazoo Racing China | No entries | No. 315 Toyota Gazoo Racing China | **(Germany) No. 927 Maxmore W&S Motorsport** |
| 1 | 1 | (China) Shanghai | (China) Feng Shaolun (China) Huang Xiaofeng | **(China) Feng Shaolun** **(China) Huang Xiaofeng** | (China) Yan Chuang | (China) Han Lichao (China) Huang Ruohan | No entries | (China) Han Lichao (China) Huang Ruohan | **(Germany) Moritz Berrenberg** |
| 1 | 2 | (China) Shanghai | (China) No. 23 Harmony Racing | (China) **No. 23 Harmony Racing** | (China) No. 29 610Racing | No. 315 Toyota Gazoo Racing China | No entries | No. 315 Toyota Gazoo Racing China | (Germany) **No. 927 Maxmore W&S Motorsport** |
| 1 | 2 | (China) Shanghai | (China) Feng Shaolun (China) Huang Xiaofeng | **(China) Feng Shaolun** **(China) Huang Xiaofeng** | (Singapore) Roy Tien Foo Tang (China) Wang Yang | (China) Han Lichao (China) Huang Ruohan | No entries | (China) Han Lichao (China) Huang Ruohan | **(Germany) Moritz Berrenberg** |
| 2 | 1 | (China) Ningbo | (China) No. 77 610Racing | **(China) No. 77 610Racing** | **(China) No. 77 610Racing** | (China) No. 810 DTM Racing | **(China) No. 58 Team KRC** | (China) No. 977 Origin7 Racing | (China) No. 789 Xietaitai Racing Team BJ One Motorsports |
| 2 | 1 | (China) Ningbo | (China) Yuan Runqi (China) He Xiaole | **(China) He Xiaole** **(China) Yuan Runqi** | **(China) He Xiaole** **(China) Yuan Runqi** | (China) Wang Haosen (China) Huang Ruohan | **(Chinese Taipei) Ethan Ho** | (France) Ethan Gialdini (China) Lenny Tian Weiyuan | (China) Pan Yiming (China) Ye Sichao |
| 2 | 2 | (China) Ningbo | (China) No. 77 610Racing | **(China) No. 27 610Racing** | **(China) No. 27 610Racing** | (China) No. 58 Team KRC | **(China) No. 58 Team KRC** | (China) No. 521 RevX Racing | (China) No. DTM Racing |
| 2 | 2 | (China) Ningbo | (China) Yuan Runqi (China) He Xiaole | **(China) Yan Chuang** | **(China) Yan Chuang** | (Chinese Taipei) Ethan Ho | **(Chinese Taipei) Ethan Ho** | (Chinese Taipei) Chang Chien-shang (China) Wang Yimin | (China) Huang Ruohan (China) Wang Haosen |
| 3 | 1 | (China) Zhuhai | (China) No. 53 610Racing | **(China) No. 53 610Racing** | **(China) No. 53 610Racing** | (Germany) No. 927 Maxmore W&S Motorsport | **(China) No. 58 Team KRC** | No. 315 Toyota Gazoo Racing China | (Germany) No. 927 Maxmore W&S Motorsport |
| 3 | 1 | (China) Zhuhai | (China) Yang Baijie (Hong Kong) Dylan Yip | **(China) Yang Baijie** **(Hong Kong) Dylan Yip** | **(China) Yang Baijie** **(Hong Kong) Dylan Yip** | (Germany) Moritz Berrenberg | **(Chinese Taipei) Ethan Ho** | (China) Han Lichao (China) Huang Kuisheng | (Germany) Moritz Berrenberg |
| 3 | 2 | (China) Zhuhai | (China) No. 23 Harmony Racing | Race postponed to the next round due to Typhoon Noul and time constraints. | | No. 315 Toyota Gazoo Racing China | Race postponed to the next round due to Typhoon Noul and time constraints. | | |
| 3 | 2 | (China) Zhuhai | (China) Feng Shaolun (China) Huang Xiaofeng | Race postponed to the next round due to Typhoon Noul and time constraints. | | (China) Han Lichao (China) Huang Kuisheng | Race postponed to the next round due to Typhoon Noul and time constraints. | | |
| 4 | 1 | (China) Shanghai | (China) No. 888 CTF Raxing | **(China) No. 23 Harmony Racing** | (China) No. 910 610Racing | (China) No. 678 GAHA Racing | **(China) No. 58 Team KRC** | (China) No. 977 Origin7 Racing | (China) No. 789 Xietaitai Racing Team BJ One Motorsports |
| 4 | 1 | (China) Shanghai | (China) Jiang Yufan (China) Zhang Yaqi | **(China) Feng Shaolun** **(China) Jiang Nan** | (China) Cui Yue (China) Liu Chao | (China) Ye Sichao (China) Yang Yiyan | **(Chinese Taipei) Ethan Ho** | (Malaysia) Naquib Azlan (China) Lenny Tian Weiyuan | (China) Jing Zefeng (China) Pan Yiming |
| 4 | 2 | (China) Shanghai | (China) No. 23 Harmony Racing | **(China) No. 910 610Racing** | **(China) No. 910 610Racing** | (Germany) No. 927 Maxmore W&S Motorsport | (China) No. 58 Team KRC | **(China) No. 977 Origin7 Racing** | (China) No. 57 KS by Pointer Racing |
| 4 | 2 | (China) Shanghai | (China) Feng Shaolun (China) Jiang Nan | **(China) Cui Yue** **(China) Liu Chao** | **(China) Cui Yue** **(China) Liu Chao** | (Germany) Moritz Berrenberg (Italy) Enzo Trulli | (Chinese Taipei) Ethan Ho | **(Malaysia) Naquib Azlan** **(China) Lenny Tian Weiyuan** | (China) Huang Hui (China) Huang Weibo |
| 4 | 3 | (China) Shanghai | (China) No. 23 Harmony Racing | **(China) No. 23 Harmony Racing** | (China) No. 27 610Racing | (Germany) No. 927 Maxmore W&S Motorsport | **(China) No. 58 Team KRC** | (Germany) No. 927 Maxmore W&S Motorsport | (China) No. 650 Origine Motorsport |
| 4 | 3 | (China) Shanghai | (China) Feng Shaolun (China) Jiang Nan | **(China) Feng Shaolun** **(China) Jiang Nan** | (Singapore) Roy Tien Foo Tang (China) Yang CHhuang | (Germany) Moritz Berrenberg (Italy) Enzo Trulli | **(Chinese Taipei) Ethan Ho** | (Germany) Moritz Berrenberg (Italy) Enzo Trulli | (China) Che Shaoyi (China) Archer Wu |
| 5 | 1 | (Malaysia) Sepang | | | | | | | |
| 5 | 2 | (Malaysia) Sepang | | | | | | | |

== Championship standings ==
Scoring system

Championship points are awarded for the first ten positions in each race. Entries are required to complete 75% of the winning car's race distance in order to be classified and earn points. Individual drivers are required to participate for a minimum of 25 minutes in order to earn championship points in any race.

| Position | **1st** | **2nd** | **3rd** | **4th** | **5th** | **6th** | **7th** | **8th** | **9th** | **10th** |
| Points | 25 | 18 | 15 | 12 | 10 | 8 | 6 | 4 | 2 | 1 |

=== GT3 ===
==== Drivers' championships ====
===== Overall =====
| Pos. | Driver | Team | SHA (China) | | NIN (China) | | ZHU (China) | | SHA (China) (Note: Half points were awarded in the first race of round four due to limited running.) | | SEP (Malaysia) | Points |
|---|---|---|---|---|---|---|---|---|---|---|---|---|
| 1 | (China) Yuan Bo | (China) Winhere Origine Motorsport | **1** | **DSQ** | **1** | **1** | C | 1 | | | | 100 |
| 2 | (China) Ye Hongli | (China) Winhere Origine Motorsport | | | **1** | **1** | C | 1 | 4 | 2 | | 99 |
| 3 | (Malaysia) Akash Nandy | (Hong Kong) Absolute Racing | 4 | 2 | 11 | 4 | | | 15 | 1 | | 67 |
| 4 | (Australia) Bayley Hall (China) Zhou Bihuang | (China) Climax Racing | 3 | 1 | 3 | 6 | C | Ret | 13 | Ret | | 63 |
| 5 | (China) Lin Yu (Italy) Lorenzo Patrese | (Chinese Taipei) FIST Team AAI | 5 | 5 | 2 | 5 | **C** | 5 | 7 | DNS | | 61 |
| 6 | (China) Chris Chia On (Italy) Enzo Trulli | (China) Phantom Global Racing | 2 | 4 | 15 | 3 | C | 8 | 11 | 5 | | 59 |
| 7 | (China) Liang Jiatong | (Hong Kong) Absolute Racing | 4 | 2 | 11 | 4 | C | 19 | | | | 42 |
| 8 | (China) Zhang Mingyang (China) Zhang Zhendong | (China) Team KRC | 7 | 6 | 22 | 14 | C | 6 | 12 | 3 | | 37 |
| 9 | (China) Lu Wei | (China) Team KRC | | | | | C | 4 | | | | 36 |
| 9 | (China) Lu Wei | (China) Winhere Origine Motorsport | | | | | | | 4 | 2 | | 36 |
| 10 | (Finland) Elias Seppänen | (China) Climax Racing | 9 | 8 | | | | | 2 | 7 | | 27 |
| 10 | (Finland) Elias Seppänen | (Macau) Elegant Racing Team | | | | | C | 7 | | | | 27 |
| 11 | (China) Gu Meng (China) Xie Xinzhe | (China) Origine Motorsport | 11 | 7 | 6 | 13 | | | 10 | 6 | | 26.5 |
| 12 | (Thailand) Sandy Stuvik | (Hong Kong) Absolute Racing | | | | | | | 15 | 1 | | 25 |
| 13 | (China) Deng Yi | (China) Winhere Origine Motorsport | **1** | **DSQ** | | | | | | | | 25 |
| 14 | (Hong Kong) "Rio" | (China) UNO Racing Team | 26 | 16 | 7 | 7 | C | **13** | 32 | 4 | | 24 |
| 14 | (China) Bian Fengjun | (China) UNO Racing Team | | | 7 | 7 | | | 32 | 4 | | 24 |
| 15 | (China) Zhang Huilin | (China) Apex Predator Harmony Racing | 6 | 10 | 23 | Ret | C | 11 | | | | 21.5 |
| 15 | (China) Zhang Huilin | (China) Apex Predator Racing | | | | | | | **1** | Ret | | 21.5 |
| 16 | (China) Chen Fangping | (China) Climax Racing | 9 | 8 | | | | | 2 | 7 | | 21 |
| 17 | (China) Adderly Fong (China) Song Yiran | (China) Uno Racing Team | | | 9 | 2 | C | 17 | | | | 20 |
| 18 | (China) Luo Kailuo (China) Yang Haojie | (China) 610Racing | 8 | 9 | 4 | 9 | C | 15 | 9 | 14 | | 21 |
| 19 | (China) Yang Baijie | (China) TBC by 610Racing | 17 | 11 | 16 | 12 | C | 2 | 29 | DNS | | 18 |
| 19 | (United States) Neil Verhagen | (China) TBC by 610Racing | | | | | C | 2 | 29 | DNS | | 18 |
| 20 | (China) Li Hanyu (China) Ou Ziyang | (China) GAHA Racing | 27 | 3 | 17 | 10 | C | 14 | 18 | 13 | | 16 |
| 21 | (China) Bao Jinlong (China) Ling Kang | (China) Origine Motorsport | | | | | C | 3 | | | | 15 |
| 22 | (China) Ruan Cunfan | (China) Team KRC | | | | | C | 4 | 19 | 9 | | 14 |
| 23 | (Macau) Liu Weng Hin | (Macau) Elegant Racing Team | | | 20 | 23 | C | 7 | 3 | 22 | | 13.5 |
| 24 | (Germany) Dennis Marschall | (China) Apex Predator Racing | | | | | | | **1** | Ret | | 12.5 |
| 25 | (China) Yang Xiaowei | (China) 610Racing | 15 | 12 | 5 | 22 | C | 20 | 25 | 16 | | 10 |
| 26 | (China) Li Lichao | (China) 610Racing | | | 5 | 22 | | | | | | 10 |
| 27 | (Hong Kong) Liu Kai Shun | (China) Apex Predator Harmony Racing | 6 | 10 | 23 | Ret | | | | | | 9 |
| 28 | (Germany) Tom Kalender | (Macau) Elegant Racing Team | 14 | 17 | | | | | 3 | 22 | | 7.5 |
| 29 | (Chinese Taipei) Chen Yin-yu (United Kingdom) Ollie Millroy | (Chinese Taipei) FIST Team AAI | 12 | 14 | | | C | 9 | 6 | DNS | | 6 |
| 30 | (Vietnam) Sawer Hoàng Đạt | (China) Apex Predator Racing | | | | | | | 5 | 11 | | 5 |
| 31 | (China) Li Ning | (China) Phantom Global Racing | 25 | 20 | 19 | 11 | C | 26 | 17 | 8 | | 4 |
| 31 | (Netherlands) Loek Hartog | (China) Phantom Global Racing | | | 19 | 11 | C | 26 | 17 | 8 | | 4 |
| 32 | (China) Zhang Shimo | (Malaysia) 33R Harmony Racing | | | 14 | 8 | | | | | | 4 |
| 32 | (China) Zhang Shimo | (China) Apex Predator Racing | | | | | C | Ret | | | | 4 |
| 32 | (China) Lu Zhiwei | (Malaysia) 33R Harmony Racing | | | 14 | 8 | | | | | | 4 |
| 33 | (China) Liu Zichen (China) Wu Yifan | (China) 326 Racing Team | 28 | 23 | 8 | 21 | C | 24 | 20 | Ret | | 4 |
| 34 | (China) David Chen Weian | (China) Apex Predator Harmony Racing | | | | | C | 11 | | | | 2 |
| 34 | (China) David Chen Weian | (China) Winhere Harmony Racing | | | | | | | 8 | **DNS** | | 2 |
| 34 | (China) Anthony Liu Xu | (China) Winhere Harmony Racing | | | | | | | 8 | **DNS** | | 2 |
| 35 | (Chinese Taipei) Brian Lee | (China) Team KRC | | | | | | | 19 | 9 | | 2 |
| 36 | (China) Liu Hangcheng (China) Min Heng | (China) Harmony Racing | 18 | 22 | | | | | | | | 1 |
| 36 | (China) Liu Hangcheng (China) Min Heng | (Hong Kong) Absolute Racing | | | 13 | 15 | C | 23 | 22 | 10 | | 1 |
| 37 | (China) Cao Qikuan (China) Hu Bo | (China) 610Racing | 16 | 18 | 10 | 17 | C | 18 | 31 | 17 | | 1 |
| 38 | (Chinese Taipei) Chuang Chi-shun (China) Su Yanming | (China) Level Motorsports | 20 | Ret | 18 | 18 | C | 10 | 21 | 12 | | 1 |
| 39 | (China) Jiang Jiawei (Canada) Samantha Tan | (China) Team KRC | 10 | 21 | | | | | | | | 1 |
| — | (China) Li Zhicong | (China) TBC by 610Racing | 17 | 11 | 16 | 12 | | | | | | 0 |
| — | (Chinese Taipei) Chen Chun-hua (China) Huang Ruohan | (China) Level Motorsports | 13 | 13 | 12 | 16 | C | 21 | 16 | Ret | | 0 |
| — | (Malaysia) Melvin Moh (China) Wang Yibo | (China) UNO Racing Team | 21 | 15 | | | C | 12 | 14 | Ret | | 0 |
| — | (China) Han Jingfeng | (China) 610Racing | 15 | 12 | | | | | | | | 0 |
| — | (Hong Kong) Marchy Lee | (China) UNO Racing Team | | | | | C | **13** | | | | 0 |
| — | (Macau) Liu Lic Ka | (Macau) Elegant Racing Team | 14 | 17 | 20 | 23 | | | | | | 0 |
| — | (China) Li Donghui (China) Li Dongshen | (China) Climax Racing | 19 | 19 | Ret | 20 | C | 16 | 23 | 15 | | 0 |
| — | (Hong Kong) Chen Yechong | (China) UNO Racing Team | 26 | 16 | | | | | | | | 0 |
| — | (Hong Kong) Chen Yechong | (Hong Kong) Absolute Racing | | | | | C | 19 | | | | 0 |
| — | (China) Steven Zhou | (China) 610Racing | | | | | | | 25 | 16 | | 0 |
| — | (China) Han Jifeng (China) He Guiming | (China) Apex Predator Racing | | | | | | | 28 | 18 | | 0 |
| — | (Chinese Taipei) Johnson Huang | (China) 610Racing | 22 | 25 | 21 | 19 | C | 22 | 24 | 19 | | 0 |
| — | (Chinese Taipei) Gavin Huang | (China) 610Racing | | | 21 | 19 | C | 22 | | | | 0 |
| — | (China) Xiao Min | (China) Incipient Racing | 23 | 26 | | | | | | | | 0 |
| — | (China) Xiao Min | (China) Aerion Racing by Incipient | | | | | C | 25 | 30 | 20 | | 0 |
| — | (Germany) Nico Menzel | (China) Phantom Global Racing | 25 | 20 | | | | | | | | 0 |
| — | (Indonesia) Benny Santoso | (China) 610Racing | | | | | C | 20 | | | | 0 |
| — | (China) Ray Wu (China) Xing Yanbin | (Malaysia) 33R Harmony Racing | 24 | 24 | | | C | Ret | 26 | 21 | | 0 |
| — | (China) Wang Wencheng | (China) Incipient Racing | 23 | 26 | | | | | | | | 0 |
| — | (China) Chen Sitong | (China) Aerion Racing by Incipient | | | | | C | 25 | | | | 0 |
| — | (China) Shi Wei (China) Xu Benyang | (China) Yunnan Zhuoyi Speed SR Team | | | | | | | 27 | **DSQ** | | 0 |
| — | (China) Liu Haoze | (China) Apex Predator Racing | | | | | C | Ret | WD | WD | | 0 |
| — | (China) Daniel Lu (China) Xu Zhefeng | (China) Bad Guy Racing | | | | | C | **DSQ** | | | | 0 |
| Pos. | Driver | Team | SHA (China) | | NIN (China) | | ZHU (China) | | SHA (China) | | SEP (Malaysia) | Points |

| Colour | Result |
|---|---|
| Gold | Winner |
| Silver | Second place |
| Bronze | Third place |
| Green | Points classification |
| Blue | Non-points classification |
| Blue | Non-classified finish (NC) |
| Purple | Retired, not classified (Ret) |
| Red | Did not qualify (DNQ) |
| Red | Did not pre-qualify (DNPQ) |
| Black | Disqualified (DSQ) |
| White | Did not start (DNS) |
| White | Withdrew (WD) |
| White | Race cancelled (C) |
| Blank | Did not practice (DNP) |
| Blank | Did not arrive (DNA) |
| Blank | Excluded (EX) |

**Bold** – Pole

Italics – Fastest Lap

Notes: Bad Guy Racing disqualified from the entire Zhuhai event, and placed on a suspended exclusion from the rest of the 2026 season of due to unsportsmanlike behaviour of Xu Zhefeng.

==== Pro-Am ====
| Pos. | Driver | Team | SHA (China) | | NIN (China) | | ZHU (China) | | SHA (China) | | SEP (Malaysia) | Points |
|---|---|---|---|---|---|---|---|---|---|---|---|---|
| 1 | (China) Ye Hongli | (China) Winhere Origine Motorsport | | | **1** | **1** | C | 1 | 3 | 2 | | 100.5 |
| 2 | (China) Yuan Bo | (China) Winhere Origine Motorsport | **1** | **DSQ** | **1** | **1** | C | 1 | | | | 100 |
| 3 | (China) Chris Chia On (Italy) Enzo Trulli | (China) Phantom Global Racing | 2 | 2 | 9 | 3 | C | 6 | 9 | 4 | | 74 |
| 4 | (China) Lin Yu (Italy) Lorenzo Patrese | (Chinese Taipei) FIST Team AAI | 4 | 3 | 2 | 4 | **C** | 4 | 7 | DNS | | 74 |
| 5 | (Australia) Bayley Hall (China) Zhou Bihuang | (China) Climax Racing | 3 | 1 | 3 | 5 | C | **Ret** | 11 | Ret | | 65 |
| 6 | (China) Zhang Mingyang (China) Zhang Zhendong | (China) Team KRC | 6 | 4 | 14 | 12 | C | 5 | 10 | 2 | | 48.5 |
| 7 | (China) Luo Kailuo (China) Yang Haojie | (China) 610Racing | 7 | 7 | 4 | 8 | C | 9 | 7 | 8 | | 37 |
| 8 | (China) Gu Meng (China) Xie Xinzhe | (China) Origine Motorsport | 9 | 5 | 5 | 11 | | | 8 | 5 | | 34 |
| 9 | (Hong Kong) "Rio" | (China) UNO Racing Team | 14 | 11 | 6 | 6 | | | 14 | 3 | | 31 |
| 9 | (China) Bian Fengjun | (China) UNO Racing Team | | | 6 | 6 | | | 14 | 3 | | 31 |
| 10 | (China) Zhang Huilin | (China) Apex Predator Harmony Racing | 5 | 8 | 15 | Ret | C | 8 | | | | 30.5 |
| 10 | (China) Zhang Huilin | (China) Apex Predator Racing | | | | | | | **1** | Ret | | 30.5 |
| 11 | (China) Chen Fangping (Finland) Elias Seppänen | (China) Climax Racing | 8 | 6 | | | | | 2 | 6 | | 29 |
| 12 | (China) Lu Wei | (China) Winhere Origine Motorsport | | | | | | | 3 | 2 | | 25.5 |
| 13 | (China) Deng Yi | (China) Winhere Origine Motorsport | **1** | **DSQ** | | | | | | | | 25 |
| 14 | (Hong Kong) Adderly Fong (China) Song Yiran | (China) UNO Racing Team | | | 7 | 2 | C | 10 | | | | 25 |
| 15 | (China) Yang Baijie | (China) TBC by 610Racing | 12 | 9 | 10 | 10 | C | 2 | 13 | DNS | | 22 |
| 16 | (United States) Neil Verhagen | (China) TBC by 610Racing | | | | | C | 2 | 13 | DNS | | 18 |
| 17 | (China) Bao Jinlong (China) Ling Kang | (China) Origine Motorsport | | | | | C | 3 | | | | 15 |
| 18 | (Chinese Taipei) Chen Yin-yu (United Kingdom) Ollie Millroy | (Chinese Taipei) FIST Team AAI | 10 | 10 | | | C | 7 | 4 | DNS | | 14 |
| 19 | (Hong Kong) Liu Kai Shun | (China) Apex Predator Harmony Racing | 5 | 8 | 15 | Ret | | | | | | 14 |
| 20 | (Germany) Dennis Marschall | (China) Apex Predator Racing | | | | | | | **1** | Ret | | 12.5 |
| 21 | (China) Lu Zhiwei (China) Zhang Shimo | (Malaysia) 33R Harmony Racing | | | 8 | 7 | | | | | | 10 |
| 22 | (China) David Chen Weian | (China) Apex Predator Harmony Racing | | | | | C | 8 | | | | 8 |
| 22 | (China) David Chen Weian | (China) Winhere Harmony Racing | | | | | | | 6 | **DNS** | | 8 |
| 23 | (China) Li Ning | (China) Phantom Global Racing | 13 | 13 | 11 | 9 | C | 13 | 12 | 7 | | 8 |
| 24 | (Netherlands) Loek Hartog | (China) Phantom Global Racing | | | 11 | 9 | C | 23 | 12 | 7 | | 8 |
| 25 | (China) Anthony Liu Xu | (China) Winhere Harmony Racing | | | | | | | 6 | **DNS** | | 4 |
| 26 | (China) Li Zhicong | (China) TBC by 610Racing | 12 | 9 | 10 | 10 | | | | | | 4 |
| — | (Hong Kong) Chen Yechong | (China) UNO Racing Team | 14 | 11 | | | | | | | | 0 |
| — | (Hong Kong) Chen Yechong | (Hong Kong) Absolute Racing | | | | | C | 11 | | | | 0 |
| — | (Macau) Liu Lic Ka | (Macau) Elegant Racing Team | 11 | 12 | 12 | 14 | | | | | | 0 |
| — | (Germany) Tom Kalender | (Macau) Elegant Racing Team | 11 | 12 | | | | | | | | 0 |
| — | (China) Liang Jiatong | (Hong Kong) Absolute Racing | | | | | C | 11 | | | | 0 |
| — | (Chinese Taipei) Gavin Huang (Chinese Taipei) Johnson Huang | (China) 610Racing | | | 13 | 13 | C | 12 | | | | 0 |
| — | (Macau) Liu Weng Hin | (Macau) Elegant Racing Team | | | 12 | 14 | | | | | | 0 |
| — | (Germany) Nico Menzel | (China) Phantom Global Racing | 13 | 13 | | | | | | | | 0 |
| — | (China) Daniel Lu (China) Xu Zhefeng | (China) Bad Guy Racing | | | | | C | **DSQ** | | | | 0 |
| Pos. | Driver | Team | SHA (China) | | NIN (China) | | ZHU (China) | | SHA (China) | | SEP (Malaysia) | Points |

==== Am ====
| Pos. | Driver | Team | SHA (China) | | NIN (China) | | ZHU (China) | | SHA (China) | | SEP (Malaysia) | Points |
|---|---|---|---|---|---|---|---|---|---|---|---|---|
| 1 | (China) Li Hanyu (China) Ou Ziyang | (China) GAHA Racing | 9 | 1 | 6 | 1 | C | 4 | 3 | 4 | | 91.5 |
| 2 | (China) Yang Xiaowei | (China) 610Racing | 3 | 2 | 1 | 8 | C | 7 | 9 | 6 | | 77 |
| 3 | (Chinese Taipei) Chen Chun-hua (China) Huang Ruohan | (China) Level Motorsports | 2 | 3 | 4 | 3 | C | 8 | 2 | Ret | | 73 |
| 4 | (China) Liu Hangcheng (China) Min Heng | (China) Harmony Racing | 5 | 8 | | | | | | | | 65 |
| 4 | (China) Liu Hangcheng (China) Min Heng | (Hong Kong) Absolute Racing | | | 5 | 2 | C | 9 | 7 | 2 | | 65 |
| 5 | (China) Cao Qikuan (China) Hu Bo | (China) 610Racing | 4 | 5 | 3 | 4 | C | 6 | 12 | 7 | | 63 |
| 6 | (Chinese Taipei) Chuang Chi-shun (China) Su Yenming | (China) Level Motorsports | 7 | Ret | 7 | 5 | C | 2 | 6 | 3 | | 59 |
| 7 | (China) Ruan Cunfan | (China) Team KRC | | | | | **C** | **1** | 4 | 1 | | 56 |
| 8 | (China) Li Donghui (China) Li Dongshen | (China) Climax Racing | 6 | 6 | Ret | 6 | C | 5 | 8 | 5 | | 46 |
| 9 | (Malaysia) Melvin Moh (China) Wang Yibo | (China) UNO Racing Team | 8 | 4 | | | C | 3 | 1 | Ret | | 43.5 |
| 10 | (China) Han Jingfeng | (China) 610Racing | 3 | 2 | | | | | | | | 33 |
| 11 | (China) Liu Zichen (China) Wu Yifan | (China) 326 Racing Team | 10 | 9 | 2 | 7 | C | 10 | 5 | Ret | | 33 |
| 12 | (Chinese Taipei) Brian Lee | (China) Team KRC | | | | | | | 4 | 1 | | 31 |
| 13 | (China) Jiang Jiawei (Canada) Samantha Tan | (China) Team KRC | 1 | 7 | | | | | | | | 31 |
| 14 | (China) Li Lichao | (China) 610Racing | | | 1 | 8 | | | | | | 29 |
| 15 | (China) Lu Wei | (China) Team KRC | | | | | **C** | **1** | | | | 25 |
| 16 | (China) Steven Zhou | (China) 610Racing | | | | | | | 9 | 6 | | 9 |
| 17 | (Indonesia) Benny Santoso | (China) 610Racing | | | | | C | 7 | | | | 6 |
| 18 | (China) Shi Wei (China) Xu Benyang | (China) Yunnan Zhuoyi Speed SR Team | | | | | | | 10 | **DSQ** | | 0.5 |
| Pos. | Driver | Team | SHA (China) | | NIN (China) | | ZHU (China) | | SHA (China) | | SEP (Malaysia) | Points |

==== Masters ====
| Pos. | Driver | Team | SHA (China) | | NIN (China) | ZHU (China) | | SHA (China) | | SEP (Malaysia) | Points |
|---|---|---|---|---|---|---|---|---|---|---|---|
| 1 | (China) Xiao Min | (China) Incipient Racing | 2 | 3 | | | | | | | 83.5 |
| 1 | (China) Xiao Min | (China) Aerion Racing by Incipient | | | | C | 1 | 3 | 2 | | 83.5 |
| 2 | (Chinese Taipei) Johnson Huang | (China) 610Racing | 1 | 2 | | | | 1 | 1 | | 80.5 |
| 3 | (China) Ray Wu (China) Xing Yanbin | (Malaysia) 33R Harmony Racing | 3 | 1 | | **C** | **Ret** | 2 | 3 | | 64 |
| 4 | (China) Chen Sitong | (China) Aerion Racing by Incipient | | | | C | 1 | 3 | 2 | | 50.5 |
| 5 | (China) Wang Wencheng | (China) Incipient Racing | 2 | 3 | | | | | | | 33 |
| Pos. | Driver | Team | SHA (China) | | NIN (China) | ZHU (China) | | SHA (China) | | SEP (Malaysia) | Points |

==== Teams' championship ====
| Pos. | Team | SHA (China) | | NIN (China) | | ZHU (China) | | SHA (China) | | SEP (Malaysia) | Points |
|---|---|---|---|---|---|---|---|---|---|---|---|
| 1 | (China) Winhere Origine Motorsport | 1 | **DSQ** | 1 | 1 | C | 1 | 4 | 2 | | 124 |
| 2 | (China) Climax Racing | 3 | 1 | 3 | 6 | C | 16 | 2 | 7 | | 84 |
| 2 | (China) Climax Racing | 9 | 8 | Ret | 20 | C | Ret | 23 | 15 | | 84 |
| 3 | (Hong Kong) Absolute Racing | 4 | 2 | 11 | 4 | C | 19 | 15 | 1 | | 68 |
| 3 | (Hong Kong) Absolute Racing | | | 13 | 15 | C | 23 | 22 | 10 | | 68 |
| 4 | (Chinese Taipei) FIST Team AAI | 5 | 5 | 2 | 5 | C | 5 | 6 | DNS | | 67 |
| 4 | (Chinese Taipei) FIST Team AAI | 12 | 14 | | | C | 9 | 7 | DNS | | 67 |
| 5 | (China) Phantom Global Racing | 2 | 4 | 15 | 3 | C | 8 | 11 | 5 | | 63 |
| 5 | (China) Phantom Global Racing | 25 | 20 | 19 | 11 | C | 26 | 17 | 8 | | 63 |
| 6 | (China) Team KRC | 7 | 6 | 22 | 14 | C | 4 | 12 | 3 | | 52 |
| 6 | (China) Team KRC | 10 | 21 | | | C | 6 | 19 | 9 | | 52 |
| 7 | (China) UNO Racing Team | 21 | 15 | 7 | 2 | C | 12 | 14 | 4 | | 44 |
| 7 | (China) UNO Racing Team | 26 | 16 | 9 | 7 | C | 13 | 32 | Ret | | 44 |
| 8 | (China) 610Racing | 8 | 9 | 4 | 9 | C | 15 | 9 | 14 | | 31 |
| 8 | (China) 610Racing | 15 | 12 | 5 | 19 | C | 18 | 24 | 16 | | 31 |
| 9 | (China) Origine Motorsport | 11 | 7 | 6 | 13 | C | 3 | 10 | 6 | | 37.5 |
| 10 | (China) TBC by 610Racing | 17 | 11 | 16 | 12 | C | 2 | 29 | DNS | | 18 |
| 11 | (China) GAHA Racing | 27 | 3 | 17 | 10 | C | 14 | 18 | 13 | | 16 |
| 12 | (Macau) Elegant Racing Team | 14 | 17 | 20 | 23 | C | 7 | 3 | 22 | | 13.5 |
| 13 | (China) Apex Predator Racing | | | | | C | Ret | 1 | Ret | | 12.5 |
| 14 | (China) Apex Predator Harmony Racing | 6 | 10 | 23 | Ret | C | 11 | | | | 9 |
| 15 | (Malaysia) 33R Harmony Racing | 24 | 24 | 14 | 8 | C | Ret | 26 | 21 | | 4 |
| 16 | (China) 326 Racing Team | 28 | 23 | 8 | 21 | C | 24 | 20 | Ret | | 4 |
| 17 | (China) Winhere Harmony Racing | 18 | 22 | | | | | 8 | DNS | | 2 |
| 18 | (China) Level Motorsports | 13 | 13 | 12 | 16 | C | 10 | 16 | 12 | | 1 |
| 18 | (China) Level Motorsports | 20 | Ret | 18 | 18 | C | 21 | 21 | Ret | | 1 |
| — | (China) Harmony Racing | 18 | 22 | | | | | | | | 0 |
| — | (China) Incipient Racing | 23 | 26 | | | | | | | | 0 |
| — | (China) Aerion Racing by Incipient | | | | | C | 25 | | | | 0 |
| — | (China) Yunnan Zhuoyi Speed SR Team | | | | | | | 27 | **DSQ** | | 0 |
| — | (China) Bad Guy Racing | | | | | C | **DSQ** | | | | 0 |
| Pos. | Team | SHA (China) | | NIN (China) | | ZHU (China) | | SHA (China) | | SEP (Malaysia) | Points |

=== GTC & GTS ===
==== Drivers' championships ====
===== Overall =====
| Pos. | Driver | Team | SHA (China) | | NIN (China) | | ZHU (China) | | SHA (China) | | | SEP (Malaysia) | Points |
GTC & 992
| 1 | (China) Feng Shaolun | (China) Harmony Racing | 1 | 1 | | | 3 | **C** | 1 | **4** | 1 | | 127 |
| 2 | (China) Yan Chuang | (China) 610Racing | 2 | 3 | 3 | 1 | 6 | C | 4 | 3 | 3 | | 123 |
| 3 | (China) He Xiaole | (China) 610Racing | 8 | 5 | **1** | **3** | 4 | C | 5 | 2 | 5 | | 104 |
| 4 | (China) Wang Yang | (China) 610Racing | 3 | 2 | 4 | 4 | 5 | C | 6 | Ret | 6 | | 87 |
| 5 | (Singapore) Roy Tien Foo Tang | (China) 610Racing | 3 | 2 | | | | | 4 | 3 | 3 | | 75 |
| 6 | (China) Huang Xiaofeng | (China) Harmony Racing | 1 | 1 | | | 3 | **C** | | | | | 65 |
| 7 | (China) Jiang Nan | (China) Harmony Racing | | | | | | | 1 | **4** | 1 | | 62 |
| 8 | (China) Cui Yue (China) Liu Chao | (China) 610Racing | 5 | 4 | | | | | 3 | 1 | 4 | | 62 |
| 9 | (China) Gan Erfu | (China) 610Racing | | | 4 | 4 | 4 | C | 6 | Ret | 6 | | 52 |
| 10 | (United States) Hana Burton | (China) 610Racing | 7 | 6 | 2 | 2 | | | | | | | 50 |
| 11 | (China) Yuan Runqi | (China) 610Racing | | | **1** | **3** | | | | | | | 40 |
| 12 | (China) Tian Xu | (China) 610Racing | WD | WD | | | 4 | C | 5 | 2 | 5 | | 50 |
| 13 | (China) Jiang Yufan (China) Zhang Yaqi | (China) CTF Racing | | | | | | | **2** | 5 | 2 | | 46 |
| 14 | (China) Shi Wei | (China) 610Racing | | | 2 | 2 | | | | | | | 36 |
| 15 | (China) Yang Baijie (Hong Kong) Dylan Yip | (China) 610Racing | | | | | **1** | C | | | | | 25 |
| 16 | (China) Liu Taiji (China) Zhou Yiran | (China) Frankenstein Racing | | | | | 2 | C | | | | | 18 |
| 17 | (China) Jiang Nan (China) Tang Zihao | (China) 027 Premium Garage by Z.Speed | 4 | 7 | | | | | | | | | 18 |
| 18 | (China) Kristie Zhu | (China) 610Racing | 7 | 6 | | | | | | | | | 14 |
| 19 | (China) Dai Yuhao (China) Ye Zhe | (China) Xietaitai Racing Team BJ One Motorsports | 6 | 8 | | | | | | | | | 12 |
| — | (China) Pan Deng (China) Zhang Meng | (China) Phantom Global Racing | Ret | DNS | | | | | | | | | 0 |
| — | (Belgium) Mathieu Detry (China) Wu Hankai | (China) Climax Racing | | | | | | | WD | WD | WD | | 0 |
GTS
| 1 | (Chinese Taipei) Ethan Ho | (China) Team KRC | 4 | 17 | 1 | **1** | 1 | C | 1 | 18 | 1 | | 137 |
| 2 | (Germany) Moritz Berrenberg | (Germany) Maxmore W&S Motorsport | 1 | 1 | | | **2** | C | 20 | **2** | 3 | | 101 |
| 3 | (China) Lenny Tian Weiyuan | (China) Origin7 Racing | Ret | 4 | 7 | 4 | 5 | C | 3 | 1 | 5 | | 90 |
| 4 | (China) Pan Yiming | (China) Xietaitai Racing Team BJ One Motorsports | 12 | 13 | 2 | 6 | 8 | C | 2 | 6 | 4 | | 68 |
| 5 | (China) Huang Ruohan | Toyota Gazoo Racing China | **2** | **2** | | | | | | | | | 63 |
| 5 | (China) Huang Ruohan | (China) DTM Racing | | | 4 | 3 | | | | | | | 63 |
| 6 | (China) Han Lichao | Toyota Gazoo Racing China | **2** | **2** | | | 3 | **C** | | | | | 51 |
| 7 | (Malaysia) Naquib Azlan | (China) Origin7 Racing | | | | | | | 3 | 1 | 5 | | 50 |
| 8 | (China) Che Shaoyi (China) Archer Wu | (China) Racing Panda | 3 | 6 | | | | | | | | | 49 |
| 8 | (China) Che Shaoyi (China) Archer Wu | (China) Origine Motorsport | | | Ret | Ret | 9 | C | 8 | 9 | 2 | | 49 |
| 9 | (China) Wang Haosen | (China) DTM Racing | 10 | 9 | 4 | 3 | 4 | C | 16 | 7 | 8 | | 52 |
| 10 | (Chinese Taipei) Chang Chien-shang (China) Wang Yimin | (China) RevX Racing | 14 | 7 | 8 | 2 | 7 | C | 13 | 4 | 10 | | 47 |
| 11 | (China) Huang Hui | (China) KS by Pointer Racing | 17 | 11 | 6 | 8 | 9 | C | 4 | 3 | 9 | | 43 |
| 12 | (China) Jing Zefeng | (China) Xietaitai Racing Team BJ One Motorsports | 12 | 13 | | | 8 | C | 2 | 6 | 4 | | 42 |
| 13 | (Italy) Enzo Trulli | (Germany) Maxmore W&S Motorsport | | | | | | | 20 | **2** | 3 | | 33 |
| 14 | (China) Liang Qi (China) Wang Tao | (China) Autohome Racing Team by CRS Racing | 15 | 10 | 3 | 5 | | | 7 | 10 | 11 | | 33 |
| 15 | (China) Huang Kuisheng | Toyota Gazoo Racing China | 18 | 3 | | | 3 | **C** | | | | | 30 |
| 16 | (China) Huang Weibo | (China) KS by Pointer Racing | | | | | | | 4 | 3 | 9 | | 29 |
| 17 | (China) Ye Sichao | (China) Xietaitai Racing Team BJ One Motorsports | | | 2 | 6 | | | | | | | 26 |
| 17 | (China) Ye Sichao | (China) GAHA Racing | | | | | | | **17** | Ret | Ret | | 26 |
| 18 | (Hong Kong) Smart Tse | (China) DTM Racing | | | | | 4 | C | 16 | 7 | 8 | | 22 |
| 19 | (France) Ethan Gialdini | (China) Origin7 Racing | | | 7 | 4 | | | | | | | 18 |
| 20 | (China) Yu Rao | Toyota Gazoo Racing China | 6 | 5 | | | 13 | C | | | | | 18 |
| 21 | (China) Liu Sen | (China) SDR Racing | 9 | 12 | 5 | 7 | WD | WD | 11 | 19 | DNS | | 18 |
| 22 | Vladimir Lobachev | (China) 326 Racing Team | | | | | 6 | C | 6 | 11 | 14 | | 16 |
| 23 | (China) Wang Hao | Toyota Gazoo Racing China | 18 | 3 | | | | | | | | | 15 |
| 24 | (China) Ruan Cunfan | (China) Team KRC | 4 | 17 | | | | | | | | | 12 |
| 25 | (United Kingdom) Georgi Dimitrov | (China) Origin7 Racing | Ret | 4 | | | | | | | | | 12 |
| 26 | (Chinese Taipei) Tsai Chang-ta (Italy) Massimiliano Wiser | (China) Level Motorsports | | | | | | | 9 | 5 | 12 | | 12 |
| 27 | (Hong Kong) Lo Kwan Kit | (China) KS by Pointer Racing | | | 6 | 8 | | | | | | | 12 |
| 28 | (China) Chen Shugang (China) Hu Haoheng | (China) GAHA Racing | 5 | 16 | | | | | | | | | 10 |
| 29 | (Thailand) Kantadhee Kusiri | (China) Origin7 Racing | | | | | 5 | C | | | | | 10 |
| 30 | (China) Li Kerong (Hong Kong) Daniel Wu | (China) Phantom Global Racing | | | | | | | Ret | 8 | 7 | | 10 |
| 31 | (China) Zhang Banggui (China) Zhang Wenyan | (China) Ultimate Racing | 7 | 14 | Ret | 9 | 10 | C | 10 | 12 | 18 | | 10 |
| 32 | (China) Xu Keming | (China) 326 Racing Team | | | | | | | 6 | 11 | 14 | | 8 |
| 33 | (China) Li Jiahao | (China) 326 Racing Team | | | | | 6 | C | | | | | 8 |
| 34 | (China) Jiang Ruxi (China) Liang Qinglin | (China) EMO Racing | 8 | Ret | | | 12 | C | 19 | 17 | 16 | | 4 |
| 35 | (Belgium) Mathieu Detry (China) Wu Hankai | (China) Climax Racing | 12 | 8 | | | | | | | | | 4 |
| 36 | (China) Liu Ci | (China) DTM Racing | 10 | 9 | | | | | | | | | 3 |
| 37 | (China) Tian Feng | (China) SDR Racing | 9 | 12 | | | WD | WD | 11 | 19 | DNS | | 2 |
| 38 | (China) Ren Tingyi (China) Wang Honghao | (China) DTM Racing | Ret | DNS | 9 | Ret | 14 | C | 15 | 13 | 13 | | 2 |
| — | (Singapore) Dennis Joon Ming Chan (China) Ouyang Zhenwei | (China) Starcars Racing | 11 | 15 | | | 11 | C | 15 | 13 | 15 | | 0 |
| — | (China) Bin Zejing (China) Zu Haochen | (China) Only Racing Team | | | | | | | 12 | 16 | 17 | | 0 |
| — | (China) He Baifeng (China) Lu Yiqin | (China) 326 Racing Team | 14 | 15 | | | | | | | | | 0 |
| — | (China) Qi Yu (China) Zhang Zhiyi | (China) Autohome Racing Team by CRS Racing | | | | | 15 | C | | | | | 0 |
| — | (China) Yang Yiyan | (China) GAHA Racing | | | | | | | **17** | Ret | Ret | | 0 |
| — | (China) Wang Zhifan | (China) Zhongshan SRC | | | | | | | 18 | DNS | DNS | | 0 |
| — | (Hong Kong) Chan Ka Ping (China) Eason Wu | (China) Mogan Team Trackday King | | | | | | | WD | WD | WD | | 0 |
| Pos. | Driver | Team | SHA (China) | | NIN (China) | | ZHU (China) | | SHA (China) | | | SEP (Malaysia) | Points |

==== Pro-Am ====
| Pos. | Driver | Team | SHA (China) | | NIN (China) | | ZHU (China) | | SHA (China) | | | SEP (Malaysia) | Points |
992
| 1 | (China) Cui Yue (China) Liu Chao | (China) 610Racing | 1 | 1 | | | | | 1 | 1 | 1 | | 125 |
| 2 | (United States) Hana Burton | (China) 610Racing | 2 | 2 | 1 | 1 | | | | | | | 86 |
| 3 | (China) He Xiaole (China) Tiang Xu | (China) 610Racing | | | | | 2 | C | 2 | 2 | 2 | | 72 |
| 4 | (China) Shi Wei | (China) 610Racing | | | 1 | 1 | | | | | | | 50 |
| 5 | (China) Kristie Zhu | (China) 610Racing | 2 | 2 | | | | | | | | | 36 |
| 6 | (China) Yang Baijie (Hong Kong) Dylan Yip | (China) 610Racing | | | | | **1** | **C** | | | | | 25 |
GTS
| 1 | (China) Lenny Tian Weiyuan | (China) Origin7 Racing | Ret | 2 | 1 | 2 | 2 | C | 1 | 1 | 2 | | 147 |
| 2 | (Chinese Taipei) Chang Chien-shang (China) Wang Yimin | (China) RevX Racing | 4 | 3 | 2 | 1 | 4 | C | 5 | 3 | 3 | | 123 |
| 3 | (China) Han Lichao | Toyota Gazoo Racing China | 1 | 1 | | | **1** | **C** | | | | | 75 |
| 4 | (Malaysia) Naquib Azlan | (China) Origin7 Racing | | | | | | | 1 | 1 | 2 | | 68 |
| 5 | Vladimir Lobachev | (China) 326 Racing Team | | | | | 3 | C | 2 | 5 | 5 | | 53 |
| 6 | (Italy) Enzo Trulli (Germany) Moritz Berrenberg | (Germany) Maxmore W&S Motorsport | | | | | | | 6 | 2 | 1 | | 51 |
| 7 | (China) Huang Ruohan | Toyota Gazoo Racing China | 1 | 1 | | | | | | | | | 50 |
| 8 | (France) Ethan Gialdini | (China) Origin7 Racing | | | 1 | 2 | | | | | | | 43 |
| 9 | (Chinese Taipei) Tsai Chang-ta (Italy) Massimiliano Wiser | (China) Level Motorsports | | | | | | | 3 | 4 | 4 | | 39 |
| 10 | (China) Xu Keming | (China) 326 Racing Team | | | | | | | 2 | 5 | 5 | | 38 |
| 11 | (Chinese Taipei) Ethan Ho (China) Ruan Cunfan | (China) Team KRC | 2 | 5 | | | | | | | | | 28 |
| 12 | (China) Bin Zejing (China) Zu Haochen | (China) Only Racing Team | | | | | | | 4 | 6 | 6 | | 28 |
| 13 | (Belgium) Mathieu Detry (China) Wu Hankai | (China) Climax Racing | 3 | 4 | | | | | | | | | 27 |
| 14 | (China) Huang Kuisheng | Toyota Gazoo Racing China | | | | | **1** | **C** | | | | | 25 |
| 15 | (United Kingdom) Georgi Dimitrov | (China) Origin7 Racing | Ret | 2 | | | | | | | | | 18 |
| 16 | (Thailand) Kantadhee Kusiri | (China) Origin7 Racing | | | | | 2 | C | | | | | 18 |
| 17 | (China) Li Jiahao | (China) 326 Racing Team | | | | | 3 | C | | | | | 15 |
| Pos. | Driver | Team | SHA (China) | | NIN (China) | | ZHU (China) | | SHA (China) | | | SEP (Malaysia) | Points |

==== Am ====
| Pos. | Driver | Team | SHA (China) | | NIN (China) | | ZHU (China) | | SHA (China) | | | SEP (Malaysia) | Points |
992
| 1 | (China) Yan Chuang | (China) 610Racing | 1 | 2 | 1 | 1 | 2 | C | 1 | 1 | 1 | | 186 |
| 2 | (China) Wang Yang | (China) 610Racing | 2 | 1 | 2 | 2 | 1 | C | 2 | Ret | 2 | | 140 |
| 3 | (Singapore) Roy Tien Foo Tang | (China) 610Racing | 2 | 1 | | | | | 1 | 1 | 1 | | 108 |
| 4 | (China) Gan Erfu | (China) 610Racing | | | 2 | 2 | 1 | C | 2 | Ret | 2 | | 97 |
| 5 | (China) Jiang Nan (China) Tang Zihao | (China) 027 Premium Garage by Z.Speed | 3 | 3 | | | | | | | | | 30 |
| — | (China) Pan Deng (China) Zhang Meng | (China) Phantom Global Racing | Ret | DNS | | | | | | | | | 0 |
GTS
| 1 | (China) Pan Yiming | (China) Xietaitai Racing Team BJ One Motorsports | 10 | 9 | 1 | 3 | 3 | C | 1 | 2 | 2 | | 119 |
| 2 | (China) Wang Haosen | (China) DTM Racing | 8 | 5 | 3 | 1 | 2 | C | 10 | 3 | 5 | | 98 |
| 3 | (China) Che Shaoyi (China) Archer Wu | (China) Racing Panda | 2 | 4 | | | | | | | | | 87 |
| 3 | (China) Che Shaoyi (China) Archer Wu | (China) Origine Motorsport | | | Ret | Ret | 4 | C | 5 | 5 | 1 | | 87 |
| 4 | (China) Huang Hui | (China) KS by Pointer Racing | 13 | 7 | 5 | 5 | 5 | C | 2 | 1 | 6 | | 87 |
| 5 | (China) Jing Zefeng | (China) Xietaitai Racing Team BJ One Motorsports | 10 | 9 | | | 3 | C | 1 | 2 | 2 | | 79 |
| 6 | (Germany) Moritz Berrenberg | (Germany) Maxmore W&S Motorsport | 1 | 1 | | | **1** | C | | | | | 75 |
| 7 | (China) Liang Qi (China) Wang Tao | (China) Autohome Racing Team by CRS Racing | 12 | 6 | 2 | 2 | | | 4 | 6 | 7 | | 70 |
| 8 | (China) Huang Weibo | (China) KS by Pointer Racing | | | | | | | 2 | 1 | 6 | | 51 |
| 9 | (Hong Kong) Smart Tse | (China) DTM Racing | | | | | 2 | C | 10 | 3 | 5 | | 44 |
| 10 | (China) Ye Sichao | (China) Xietaitai Racing Team BJ One Motorsports | | | 1 | 3 | | | | | | | 40 |
| 10 | (China) Ye Sichao | (China) GAHA Racing | | | | | | | 11 | Ret | Ret | | 40 |
| 11 | (China) Huang Ruohan | (China) DTM Racing | | | 3 | 1 | | | | | | | 40 |
| 12 | (China) Zhang Banggui (China) Zhang Wenyan | (China) Ultimate Racing | 5 | 10 | Ret | 6 | 6 | C | 6 | 7 | 11 | | 41 |
| 13 | (China) Liu Sen | (China) SDR Racing | 7 | 8 | 4 | 4 | WD | WD | 7 | 12 | DNS | | 40 |
| 14 | (China) Tang Yile (China) Jiang Tengyi | (China) Origin7 Racing | | | | | | | 3 | 9 | 3 | | 32 |
| 15 | (China) Yu Rao | Toyota Gazoo Racing China | 4 | 3 | | | 9 | C | | | | | 29 |
| 16 | (China) Li Kerong (Hong Kong) Daniel Wu | (China) Phantom Global racing | | | | | | | Ret | 4 | 4 | | 24 |
| 17 | (Hong Kong) Lo Kwan Kit | (China) KS by Pointer Racing | | | 5 | 5 | | | | | | | 20 |
| 18 | (China) Huang Kuisheng (China) Wang hao | Toyota Gazoo Racing China | 14 | 2 | | | | | | | | | 18 |
| 19 | (Singapore) Dennis Joon Ming Chan (China) Ouyang Zhenwei | (China) Starcars Racing | 9 | 12 | | | 7 | C | 8 | 8 | 9 | | 18 |
| 20 | (China) Tian Feng | (China) SDR Racing | 7 | 8 | | | WD | WD | 7 | 12 | DNS | | 16 |
| 21 | (China) Chen Shugang (China) Hu Haoheng | (China) GAHA Racing | 3 | 13 | | | | | | | | | 15 |
| 22 | (China) Liu Ci | (China) DTM Racing | 8 | 5 | | | | | | | | | 14 |
| 23 | (China) Jiang Ruxi (China) Liang Qinglin | (China) EMO Racing | 6 | Ret | | | 8 | C | 13 | 11 | | | 12 |
| 24 | (China) Ren Tingyi (China) Wang Honghao | (China) DTM Racing | Ret | DNS | 6 | Ret | 10 | C | 9 | 10 | | | 11 |
| — | (China) He Baifeng (China) Lu Yiqin | (China) 326 Racing Team | 11 | 11 | | | | | | | | | 0 |
| — | (China) Qi Yu (China) Zhang Zhiyi | (China) Autohome Racing Team by CRS Racing | | | | | 11 | C | | | | | 0 |
| — | (China) Wang Zhifan | (China) Zhongshan SRC | | | | | | | 12 | DNS | DNS | | 0 |
| — | (Hong Kong) Chan Ka Ping (China) Eason Wu | (China) Mogan Team Trackday King | | | | | | | WD | WD | WD | | 0 |
| Pos. | Driver | Team | SHA (China) | | NIN (China) | | ZHU (China) | | SHA (China) | | | SEP (Malaysia) | Points |

==== Team's championship ====
| Pos. | Team | SHA (China) | | NIN (China) | | ZHU (China) | | SHA (China) | | | SEP (Malaysia) | Points |
GTC & 992
| 1 | (China) 610Racing | 2 | 3 | 1 | 1 | 1 | C | 3 | 1 | 3 | | 286 |
| 1 | (China) 610Racing | 3 | 2 | 2 | 2 | 4 | C | 4 | 2 | 2 | | 286 |
| 2 | (China) Harmony Racing | 1 | 1 | | | 3 | C | 1 | 4 | 1 | | 137 |
| 3 | (China) CTF Racing | | | | | | | 2 | 5 | 2 | | 46 |
| 4 | (China) Frankenstein Racing | | | | | 2 | C | | | | | 18 |
| 5 | (China) 027 Premium Garage by Z.Speed | 4 | 7 | | | | | | | | | 18 |
| 6 | (China) Xietaitai Racing Team BJ One Motorsports | 6 | 8 | | | | | | | | | 12 |
| — | (China) Phantom Global Racing | Ret | DNS | | | | | | | | | 0 |
| — | (China) Climax Racing | | | | | | | WD | WD | WD | | 0 |
GTS
| 1 | (China) Team KRC | 4 | 17 | 1 | 1 | 1 | C | 1 | 18 | 1 | | 137 |
| 2 | (China) Origin7 Racing | Ret | 4 | 7 | 4 | 5 | C | 3 | 1 | 5 | | 108 |
| 2 | (China) Origin7 Racing | | | | | | | 5 | 18 | 6 | | 108 |
| 3 | (Germany) Maxmore W&S Motorsport | 1 | 1 | | | 2 | C | 20 | 2 | 3 | | 101 |
| 4 | Toyota Gazoo Racing China | 2 | 2 | | | 3 | C | | | | | 74 |
| 4 | Toyota Gazoo Racing China | 6 | 3 | | | 13 | C | | | | | 74 |
| 5 | (China) Xietaitai Racing Team BJ One Motorsports | 12 | 13 | 2 | 6 | 8 | C | 2 | 6 | 4 | | 68 |
| 6 | (China) DTM Racing | 10 | 9 | 4 | 3 | 4 | C | 15 | 7 | 8 | | 54 |
| 6 | (China) DTM Racing | Ret | DNS | 9 | Ret | 14 | C | 16 | 15 | 13 | | 54 |
| 7 | (China) RevX Racing | 14 | 7 | 8 | 2 | 7 | C | 13 | 5 | 10 | | 45 |
| 8 | (China) KS by Pointer Racing | 17 | 11 | 6 | 8 | 9 | C | 4 | 3 | 9 | | 43 |
| 9 | (China) Autohome Racing Team by CRS Racing | 15 | 10 | 3 | 5 | 15 | C | 7 | 10 | 11 | | 33 |
| 10 | (China) Origine Motorsport | | | Ret | Ret | 9 | C | 8 | 9 | 2 | | 26 |
| 11 | (China) Racing Panda | 3 | 6 | | | | | | | | | 23 |
| 12 | (China) 326 Racing Team | 14 | 15 | | | 6 | C | 6 | 11 | 14 | | 16 |
| 13 | (China) Level Motorsports | | | | | | | 9 | 5 | 12 | | 12 |
| 12 | (China) GAHA Racing | 5 | 16 | | | | | 17 | Ret | Ret | | 10 |
| 13 | (China) Phantom Global Racing | | | | | | | Ret | 8 | 7 | | 10 |
| 14 | (China) Ultimate Racing | 7 | 14 | Ret | 9 | 10 | C | 10 | 12 | 18 | | 9 |
| 15 | (China) EMO Racing | 8 | Ret | | | 12 | C | 19 | 17 | 16 | | 4 |
| 16 | (China) Climax Racing | 12 | 8 | | | | | | | | | 4 |
| 17 | (China) SDR Racing | 9 | 12 | | | WD | WD | 11 | 19 | DNS | | 2 |
| — | (China) Starcars Racing | 11 | 15 | | | 11 | C | 14 | 13 | 16 | | 0 |
| — | (China) Only Racing Team | | | | | | | 12 | 16 | 17 | | 0 |
| — | (China) Zhongshan SRC | | | | | | | 18 | DNS | DNS | | 0 |
| — | (China) Mogan Team Trackday King | | | | | | | WD | WD | WD | | 0 |
| Pos. | Team | SHA (China) | | NIN (China) | | ZHU (China) | | SHA (China) | | | SEP (Malaysia) | Points |
