= Shimo Zhang =

Chinese racing driver (born 2008)

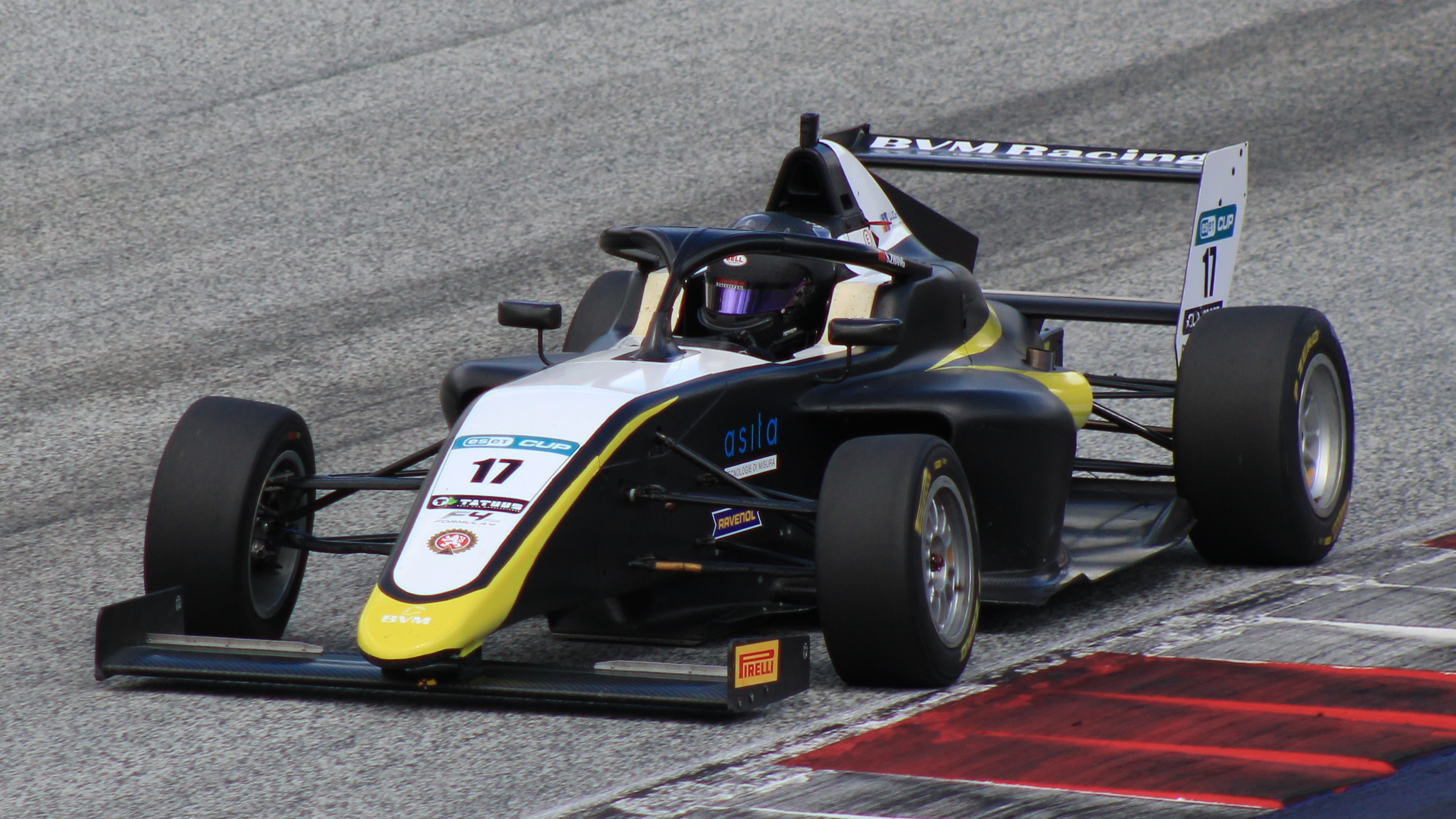
- Zhang racing in the Formula 4 CEZ Championship at the Red Bull Ring
- Nationality: (China) Chinese
- Born: 23 February 2008 (age 18) Hong Kong

F4 Chinese Championship career
- Debut season: 2025
- Current team: Yinqiao ACM Geeke Racing
- Car number: 21
- Starts: 20 (20 entries)
- Wins: 14
- Podiums: 18
- Poles: 3
- Fastest laps: 9
- Best finish: 1st in 2025

Previous series
- 2023–2024; 2023–2024; 2023: Italian F4; F4 CEZ; F4 South East Asia

Championship titles
- 2025: F4 Chinese

Chinese name
- Traditional Chinese: 張石墨
- Simplified Chinese: 张石墨
- Hanyu Pinyin: Zhāng Shì Mò

Shimo "Simon" Zhang (Chinese: 张石墨; pinyin: Zhāng Shì Mò; born 23 February 2008) is a Chinese racing driver who most recently competed in the 2025 F4 Chinese Championship driving for Yinqiao ACM Geeke Racing. He raced under a Japanese licence in karting and used a Hong Kong and later an Italian licence in Formula 4.

== Career ==
=== Formula 4 CEZ Championship ===
==== 2023 ====
Zhang made his open-wheel racing debut in final round of the 2023 Formula 4 CEZ Championship at Balaton Park driving for Jenzer Motorsport. He would score a best result of fifth twice in race one and race three.

==== 2024 ====
Zhang returned to the championship for the opening two rounds of the 2024 season at Balaton Park and the Red Bull Ring. In the opening race of the season, he finished on the podium in third and got the fastest lap of the race. Zhang was awarded points for second place as winner Ethan Ischer was a guest driver ineligible of scoring points. Following round one, Zhang switched teams from Jenzer Motorsport to BVM Racing. In his remaining races, Zhang finished in the points in all three races for BVM.

=== Italian F4 Championship ===
==== 2023 ====
After his car racing debut in the F4 CEZ Championship, Zhang competed in the final round of the 2023 Italian F4 Championship for Jenzer Motorsport. He had an unsuccessful stint, with a best result of only 18th.

==== 2024 ====
For 2024, Zhang re-signed with Jenzer Motorsport for the full season. Following round three at Vallelunga, he left the championship.

=== Formula 4 South East Asia Championship ===
==== 2023 ====
Zhang signed H-Star Racing to compete in the first round of the 2023 Formula 4 South East Asia Championship at Zhuzhou International Circuit. He would only be scored as a finisher in race three due to a retirement in race one and a disqualification in race two due to an invalid stewards decision

=== Formula 4 Chinese Championship ===
==== 2025 ====
Zhang returned to racing in 2025, signing with ACM Geeke Racing to compete in the 2025 F4 Chinese Championship. At the opening round held at the Ningbo International Circuit, he qualified on pole in both sessions and won three of the first four races. Over the course of the season, Zhang achieved fourteen wins, eighteen podiums, nine fastest laps, and three pole positions out of twenty races. He set two track records in the championship, at the Ningbo International Circuit and the Shanghai International Circuit. Zhang won the drivers’ championship with 424 points, finishing 133 points ahead of the runner-up—one of the largest margins in the series’ history—and contributed to ACM Geeke Racing securing the teams’ championship.

== Karting record ==
=== Karting career summary ===
| Season | Series | Team | Position |
|---|---|---|---|
| 2019 | WSK Euro Series — 60 Mini | Parolin / TM Racing | 57th |
| 2019 | WSK Open Cup — 60 Mini | Parolin / TM Racing | 28th |
| 2019 | WSK Final Cup — 60 Mini | Parolin / TM Racing | 28th |
| 2019 | IAME Series Asia – Cadet | Independent | 10th |
| 2020 | Winter Series | Parolin / TM | 15th |
| 2020 | WSK Super Master Series — 60 Mini | Parolin / TM | 29th |
| 2021 | Champions of the Future – OKJ | Parolin | 91st |
| 2021 | CIK-FIA European Championship — OKJ | Parolin | 74th |
| 2021 | WSK Euro Series — OKJ | Parolin / TM | 25th |
| 2021 | Italian ACI Karting Championship — OKJ | Parolin | 7th |
| 2021 | Italian ACI Karting Championship — X30 Junior | Parolin | 58th |
| 2022 | WSK Champions Cup — OKJ | KR / IAME | 18th |
| 2022 | WSK Super Master Series — OKJ | KR / IAME | 22nd |
| 2022 | Champions of the Future – OKJ | KR / IAME | 55th |
| 2022 | Andrea Margutti Trophy – OKJ | KR / IAME | 6th |
| 2022 | CIK-FIA European Championship — OKJ | KR / IAME | 71st |
| 2022 | WSK Euro Series — OK | Tony Kart / IAME | 49th |
| 2022 | Italian ACI Karting Championship — X30 Senior | Tony Kart | 22nd |
| 2022 | FIA World Karting Championship — OK | KR / IAME | 55th |
| 2022 | WSK Open Cup — OK | KR / IAME | 19th |
| 2022 | Industry Trophy — X30 Senior | Tony Kart | 21st |
| 2022 | IAME Warriors Final — X30 Senior | Tony Kart | 29th |
| 2022 | WSK Final Cup — OK | Tony Kart / IAME | 28th |
| 2023 | WSK Super Master Series — OK | KR / IAME | 37th |
| 2023 | Champions of the Future – OK | KR / IAME | 54th |
| 2023 | CIK-FIA European Championship — OK | KR / IAME | 32nd |

== Racing record ==
=== Racing career summary ===
| Season | Series | Team | Races | Wins | Poles | F/Laps | Podiums | Points | Position |
|---|---|---|---|---|---|---|---|---|---|
| 2023 | Formula 4 CEZ Championship | Jenzer Motorsport | 3 | 0 | 0 | 0 | 0 | 28 | 12th |
| 2023 | Italian F4 Championship | Jenzer Motorsport | 3 | 0 | 0 | 0 | 0 | 0 | 43rd |
| 2023 | Formula 4 South East Asia Championship | H-Star Racing | 3 | 0 | 0 | 0 | 0 | 10 | 22nd |
| 2024 | Formula 4 CEZ Championship | Jenzer Motorsport | 3 | 0 | 0 | 1 | 1 | 41 | 13th |
| 2024 | Formula 4 CEZ Championship | BVM Racing | 3 | 0 | 0 | 0 | 0 | 41 | 13th |
| 2024 | Italian F4 Championship | Jenzer Motorsport | 9 | 0 | 0 | 0 | 0 | 0 | 33rd |
| 2025 | F4 Chinese Championship | Yinqiao ACM Geeke Racing | 20 | 14 | 3 | 9 | 18 | 424 | **1st** |
| 2025 | FIA F4 World Cup | | 1 | 0 | 0 | 0 | 0 | —N/a | DNF |
| 2026 | China GT Championship - GT3 | 33R Harmony Racing | | | | | | | |
| 2026 | China GT Championship - GT3 | Apex Predator Racing | | | | | | | |

=== Complete Formula 4 CEZ Championship results ===
(key) (Races in bold indicate pole position; races in italics indicate fastest lap)

| Year | Team | 1 | 2 | 3 | 4 | 5 | 6 | 7 | 8 | 9 | 10 | 11 | 12 | 13 | 14 | 15 | 16 | 17 | 18 | DC | Points |
|---|---|---|---|---|---|---|---|---|---|---|---|---|---|---|---|---|---|---|---|---|---|
| 2023 | Jenzer Motorsport | HUN; 1 | HUN; 2 | RBR; 1 | RBR; 2 | SVK; 1 | SVK; 2 | MOS; 1 | MOS; 2 | MOS; 3 | BRN; 1 | BRN; 2 | BAL; 1; 5 | BAL; 2; 6 | BAL; 3; 5 | | | | | 12th | 28 |
| 2024 | Jenzer Motorsport | BAL; 1; 3 | BAL; 2 Ret | BAL; 3; 5 | | | | | | | | | | | | | | | | 13th | 41 |
| 2024 | BVM Racing | | | | RBR; 1; 11 | RBR; 2; 7 | RBR; 3; 9 | SVK; 1 | SVK; 2 | SVK; 3 | MOS; 1 | MOS; 2 | MOS; 3 | BRN; 1 | BRN; 2 | BRN; 3 | SAL; 1 | SAL; 2 | SAL; 3 | 13th | 41 |

=== Complete Italian F4 Championship results ===
(key) (Races in bold indicate pole position) (Races in italics indicate fastest lap)

| Year | Team | 1 | 2 | 3 | 4 | 5 | 6 | 7 | 8 | 9 | 10 | 11 | 12 | 13 | 14 | 15 | 16 | 17 | 18 | 19 | 20 | 21 | 22 | DC | Points |
|---|---|---|---|---|---|---|---|---|---|---|---|---|---|---|---|---|---|---|---|---|---|---|---|---|---|
| 2023 | Jenzer Motorsport | IMO; 1 | IMO; 2 | IMO; 3 | IMO; 4 | MIS; 1 | MIS; 2 | MIS; 3 | SPA; 1 | SPA; 2 | SPA; 3 | MNZ; 1 | MNZ; 2 | MNZ; 3 | LEC; 1 | LEC; 2 | LEC; 3 | MUG; 1 | MUG; 2 | MUG; 3 | VLL; 1; 21 | VLL; 2 Ret | VLL; 3; 18 | 43rd | 0 |
| 2024 | Jenzer Motorsport | MIS; 1; 24 | MIS; 2; 14 | MIS; 3; 15 | IMO; 1; 13 | IMO; 2; 33† | IMO; 3; 15 | VLL; 1 Ret | VLL; 2; 19 | VLL; 3; 18 | MUG; 1 | MUG; 2 | MUG; 3 | LEC; 1 | LEC; 2 | LEC; 3 | CAT; 1 | CAT; 2 | CAT; 3 | MNZ; 1 | MNZ; 2 | MNZ; 3 | | 33rd | 0 |

^{*} Season still in progress.

=== Complete Formula 4 South East Asia Championship results ===
(key) (Races in bold indicate pole position; races in italics indicate fastest lap)

| Year | Entrant | 1 | 2 | 3 | 4 | 5 | 6 | 7 | 8 | 9 | 10 | 11 | Pos | Points |
|---|---|---|---|---|---|---|---|---|---|---|---|---|---|---|
| 2023 | H-Star Racing | ZZIC; 1 Ret | ZZIC; 2 DSQ | ZZIC; 3; 5 | MAC; 1 | MAC; 2 | SEP1; 1 | SEP1; 2 | SEP1; 3 | SEP2; 1 | SEP2; 2 | SEP2; 3 | 22nd | 10 |

=== Complete F4 Chinese Championship results ===
(key) (Races in bold indicate pole position; races in italics indicate fastest lap)

| Year | Entrant | 1 | 2 | 3 | 4 | 5 | 6 | 7 | 8 | 9 | 10 | 11 | 12 | 13 | 14 | 15 | 16 | 17 | 18 | 19 | 20 | DC | Points |
|---|---|---|---|---|---|---|---|---|---|---|---|---|---|---|---|---|---|---|---|---|---|---|---|
| 2025 | Yinqiao ACM Geeke Racing | **NIC**; **1**; 1 | NIC; 2; 11 | **NIC**; **3**; 1 | NIC; 4; 1 | **SIC**; **1**; 3 | SIC; 2; 1 | SIC; 3; 2 | SIC; 4; 1 | ZIC1; 1; 1 | ZIC1; 2; 1 | ZIC1; 3; 1 | ZIC1; 4; 1 | CTC; 1; 6 | CTC; 2; 1 | CTC; 3; 1 | CTC; 4; 2 | ZIC2; 1; 4 | ZIC2; 2; 1 | ZIC2; 3; 1 | ZIC2; 4; 1 | 1st | 334 |

=== Complete FIA F4 World Cup results ===
| Year | Car | Qualifying | Quali Race | Main Race |
|---|---|---|---|---|
| 2025 | Mygale M21-F4 | 10th | 7th | DNF |
