= Yaroslav Veselaho =

Ukrainian racing driver (born 2005)

- Ярослав Веселаго
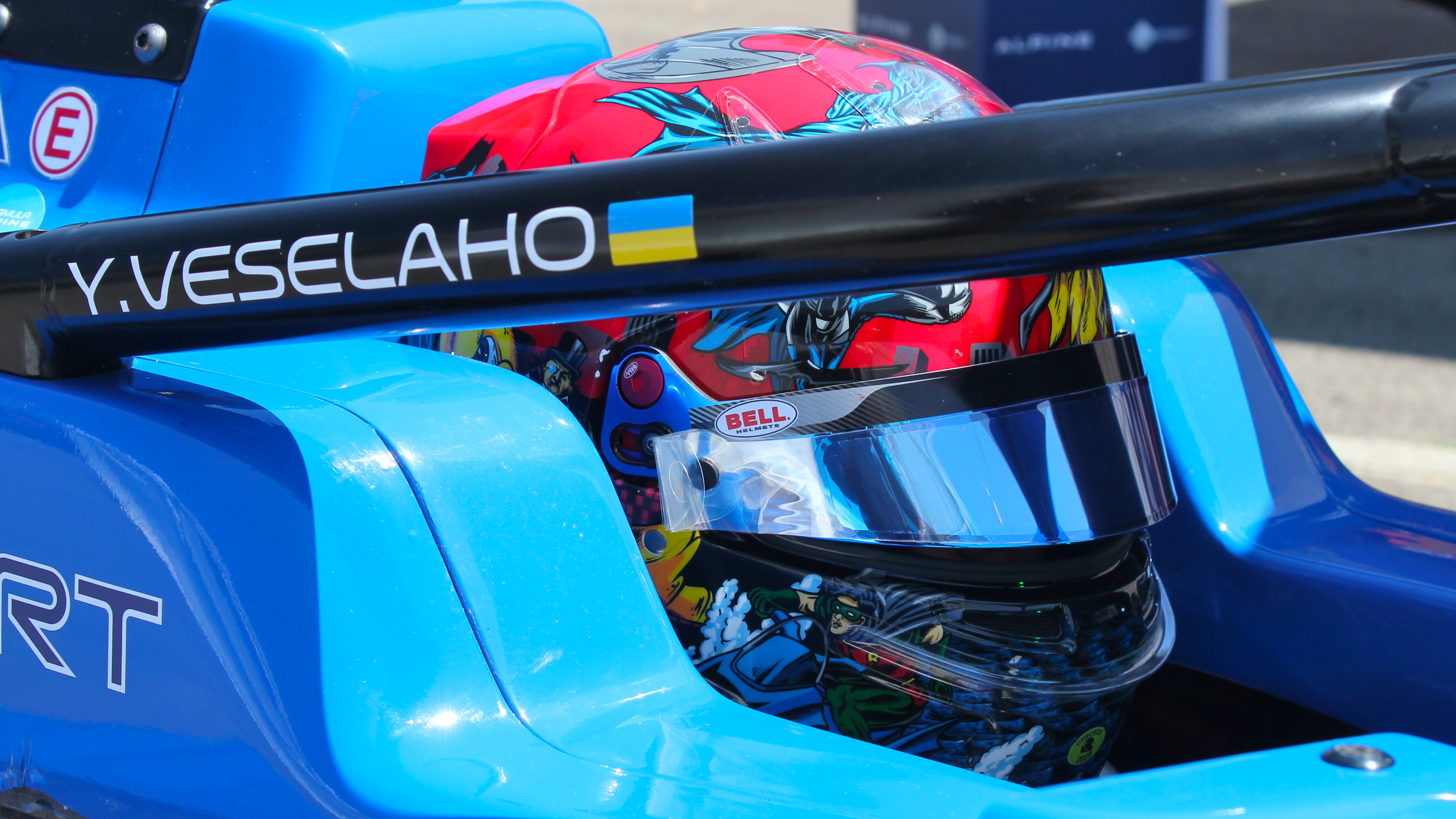
- Veselaho in 2025
- Born: 1 February 2005 (age 21); Ukraine
- Nationality: (Ukraine) Ukrainian

Formula Regional European Championship career
- Debut season: 2024
- Current team: Saintéloc Racing
- Car number: 96
- Former teams: ART Grand Prix
- Starts: 35
- Wins: 0
- Podiums: 0
- Poles: 0
- Fastest laps: 0
- Best finish: 34th in 2024

Previous series
- 2024–2025; 2023; 2023: FR Middle East; Ultimate Cup Series; French F4

Yaroslav Veselaho (Ukrainian: Ярослав Веселаго; born 1 February 2005) is a Ukrainian racing driver who currently competes in the International GT Open with AF Corse.

Veselaho started his career in drifting before moving into French F4 in 2023. He progressed to Formula Regional, where he raced during 2024 and 2025.

== Early career ==
=== Drifting ===
Veselaho started off his racing career in Ukraine, and in 2020, he became the Bitlook Pro-Am Drift champion in Ukraine before making the switch to single-seater racing.

=== Formula 4 ===
Veselaho started his single-seater career by joining the French F4 Championship in 2023. He managed a best result of fifth in a tough season seeing him finish in 21st in the drivers' championship.

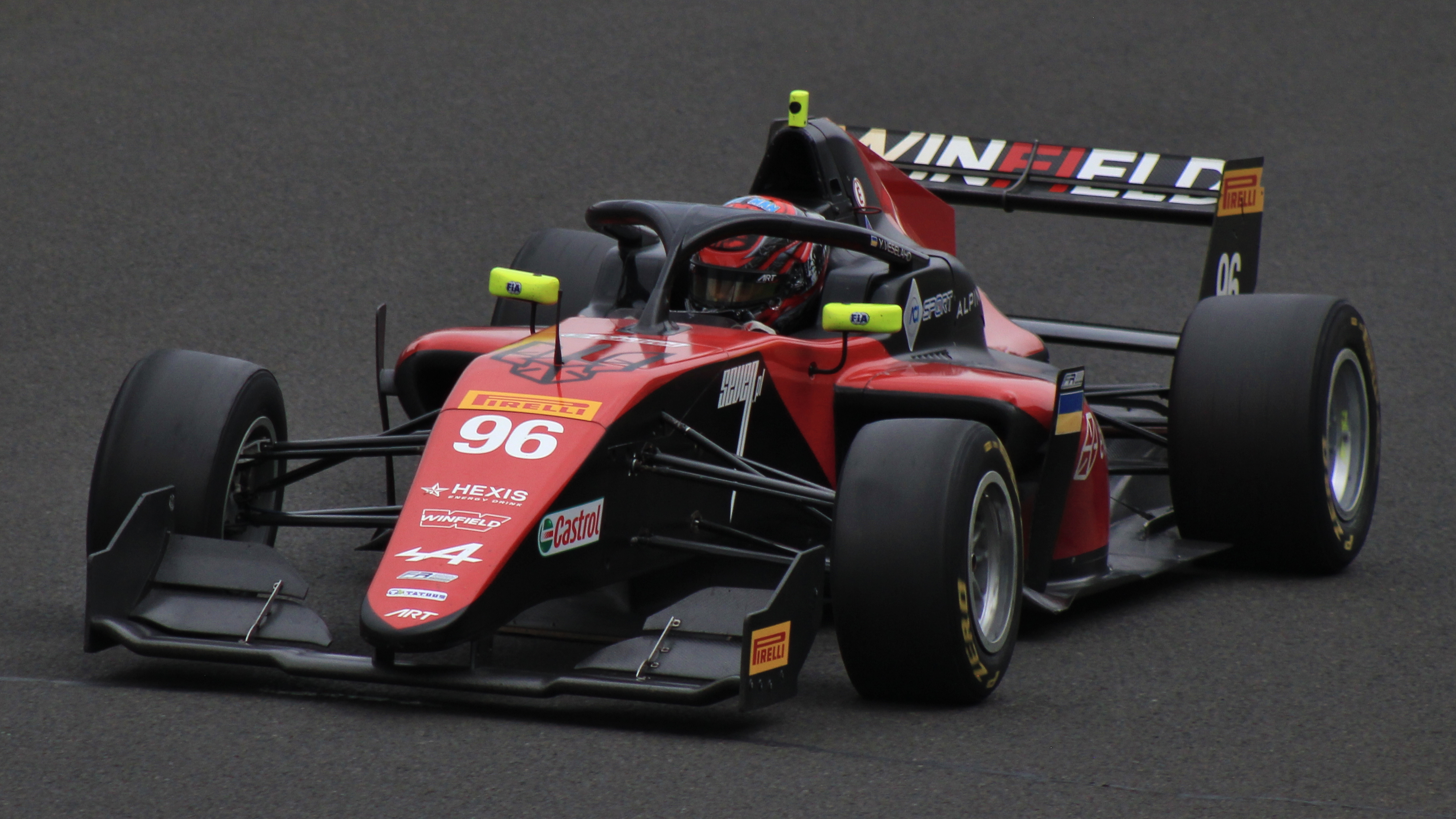
Veselaho driving at the Hungaroring during the 2024 Formula Regional European Championship

=== Formula Regional ===
==== 2024 ====
Veselaho made Formula Regional debut in the 2024 Formula Regional Middle East Championship, driving for Xcel Motorsport. He came 33rd in championship, scoring no points.

For his main campaign, Veselaho competed in the Formula Regional European Championship for ART Grand Prix. He had a tough campaign, failing to score a single point and scoring a best result of 20th as he finished 35th in the standings.

==== 2025 ====
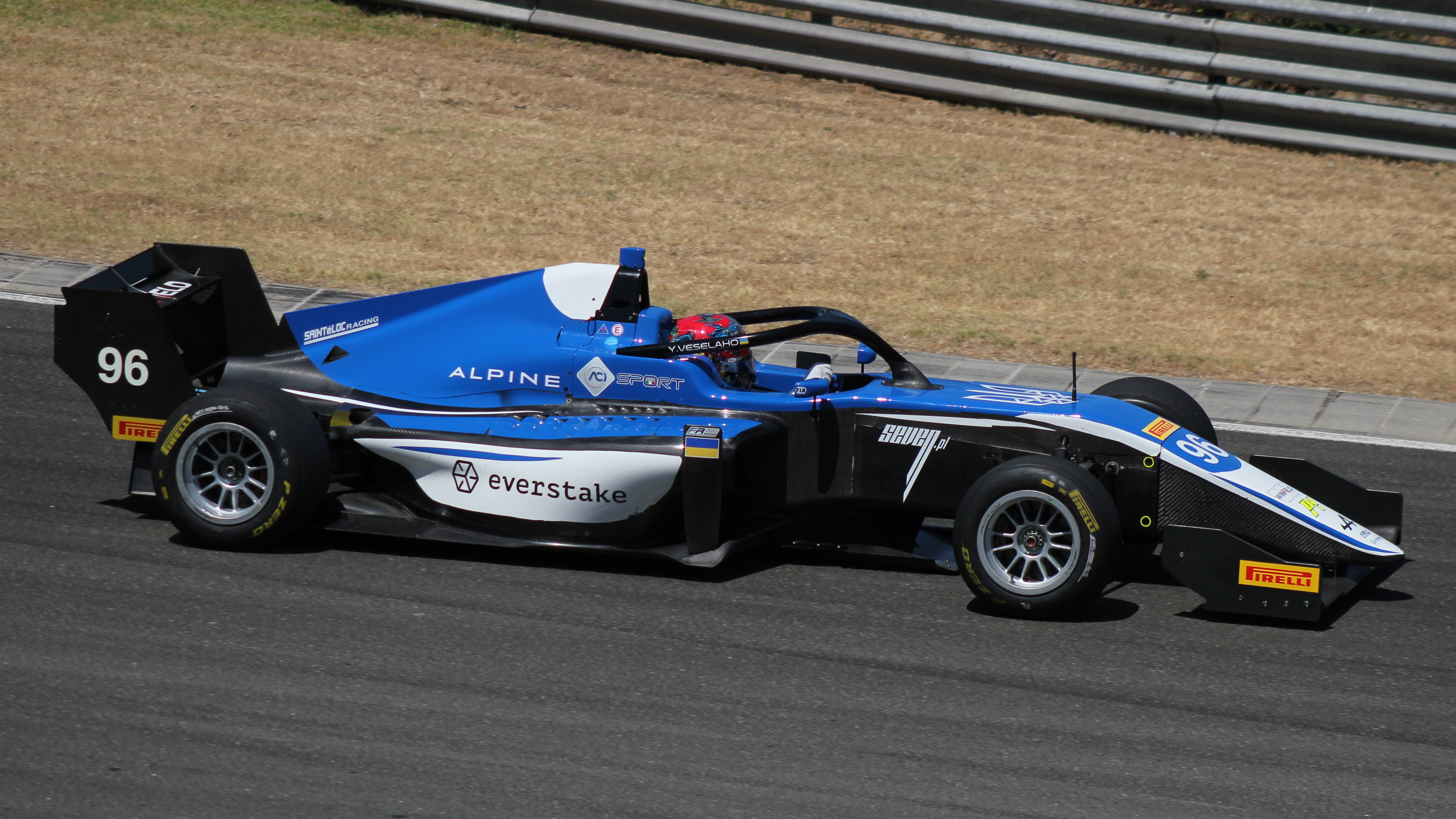
Veselaho driving at the Hungaroring during the 2025 Formula Regional European Championship

Veselaho contested the 2025 Formula Regional Middle East Championship with French outfit Saintéloc Racing. He came 26th in championship, once again scoring no points.

Veselaho continued in the Formula Regional European Championship for 2025, but switched to Saintéloc Racing.

== GT career ==
=== 2025: GT3 debut ===
Veselaho made his first GT3 start in the final round of the 2025 24H Series, piloting a Mercedes-AMG GT3 Evo for the GetSpeed team at the 24 Hours of Barcelona.

=== 2026 ===
Heading into 2026, Veselaho took part in two rounds of the GT Winter Series. Competing as the lone driver of the No. 96 AF Corse entry, Veselaho scored a podium at Barcelona.

Veselaho remained at AF Corse for his main campaign in 2026, contesting in International GT Open alongside Ferrari factory drivers Thomas Neubauer and Yifei Ye, the latter substituting the former at two events.

== Racing record ==
=== Racing career summary ===
Season	Series	Team	Races	Wins	Poles	F/Laps	Podiums	Points	Position
2023	French F4 Championship	FFSA Academy	21	0	0	0	0	6	21st
2023	Ultimate Cup Series Challenge Monoplace - F3R	Winfield	0	0	0	0	0	0	NC
2024	Formula Regional Middle East Championship	Xcel Motorsport	15	0	0	0	0	0	33rd
2024	Formula Regional European Championship	ART Grand Prix	18	0	0	0	0	0	35th
2025	Formula Regional Middle East Championship	Saintéloc Racing	15	0	0	0	0	0	26th
2025	Formula Regional European Championship	Saintéloc Racing	17	0	0	0	0	0	34th
2025	24H Series - GT3	GetSpeed Performance	1	0	0	0	0	0	NC
2026	GT Winter Series - GT3	AF Corse	6	0	0	0	1	70	11th
2026	International GT Open	AF Corse	14	0	0	0	0	49	9th

^{*} Season still in progress.

=== Complete French F4 Championship results ===
(key) (Races in bold indicate pole position; races in italics indicate fastest lap)

Year	1	2	3	4	5	6	7	8	9	10	11	12	13	14	15	16	17	18	19	20	21	DC	Points
2023	NOG; 1; 22	NOG; 2; 16	NOG; 3; 23	MAG; 1; 16	MAG; 2 Ret	MAG; 3 Ret	PAU; 1 Ret	PAU; 2; 5	PAU; 3 Ret	SPA; 1; 14	SPA; 2; 20	SPA; 3; 19	MIS; 1 Ret	MIS; 2 Ret	MIS; 3; 16	LÉD; 1; 20	LÉD; 2; 21	LÉD; 3; 14	LEC; 1; 22	LEC; 2; 17	LEC; 3; 21	21st	6

=== Complete Formula Regional Middle East Championship results ===
(key) (Races in bold indicate pole position) (Races in italics indicate fastest lap)

Year	Entrant	1	2	3	4	5	6	7	8	9	10	11	12	13	14	15	DC	Points
2024	Xcel Motorsport	YMC1; 1; 25	YMC1; 2; 23	YMC1; 3; 20	YMC2; 1; 23	YMC2; 2 Ret	YMC2; 3; 25†	DUB1; 1; 27	DUB1; 2; 21	DUB1; 3; 20	YMC3; 1; 24	YMC3; 2; 19	YMC3; 3; 21	DUB2; 1; 22	DUB2; 2 Ret	DUB2; 3 Ret	33rd	0
2025	Saintéloc Racing	YMC1; 1; 20	YMC1; 2; 19	YMC1; 3; 17	YMC2; 1; 23	YMC2; 2; 16	YMC2; 3 Ret	DUB; 1; 14	DUB; 2; 17	DUB; 3; 16	YMC3; 1; 20	YMC3; 2; 21	YMC3; 3; 17	LUS; 1; 19	LUS; 2; 17	LUS; 3; 23	26th	0

=== Complete Formula Regional European Championship results ===
(key) (Races in bold indicate pole position) (Races in italics indicate fastest lap)

Year	Team	1	2	3	4	5	6	7	8	9	10	11	12	13	14	15	16	17	18	19	20	DC	Points
2024	ART Grand Prix	HOC; 1 Ret	HOC; 2; 26	SPA; 1; 25	SPA; 2; 26	ZAN; 1; 29	ZAN; 2; 28	HUN; 1; 23	HUN; 2; 28	MUG; 1; 27	MUG; 2; 29	LEC; 1; 24	LEC; 2; 29	IMO; 1; 26	IMO; 2; 20	RBR; 1 Ret	RBR; 2 WD	CAT; 1 DNS	CAT; 2; 26	MNZ; 1; 22	MNZ; 2; 23	35th	0
2025	Saintéloc Racing	MIS; 1	MIS; 2	SPA; 1; 24	SPA; 2; 22	ZAN; 1; 22	ZAN; 2; 23	HUN; 1; 21	HUN; 2; 18	LEC; 1 DNS	LEC; 2; 22	IMO; 1; 23	IMO; 2; 23	RBR; 1; 25	RBR; 2; 25	CAT; 1; 23	CAT; 2; 24	HOC; 1; 26	HOC; 2; 22	MNZ; 1; 18	MNZ; 2; 17	34th	0

=== Complete International GT Open results ===
(key) (Races in bold indicate pole position) (Races in italics indicate fastest lap)

Year	Team	Car	Class	1	2	3	4	5	6	7	8	9	10	11	12	13	14	Pos.	Points
2026	AF Corse	Ferrari 296 GT3 Evo	Pro	ALG; 1; 7	ALG; 2; 7	SPA; Ret	MIS; 1 Ret	MIS; 2; 9	HUN; 1; 5	HUN; 2; 6	LEC; 1; 5	LEC; 2; 7	HOC; 1; 7	HOC; 2; 6	MNZ; Ret	CAT; 1; 4	CAT; 2; 10	9th	49
