= Garret Barry =

Garret Barry may refer to:

- Garret Barry (piper) (1847–1899), blind Irish piper
- Garret Barry (soldier) (died 1647), Irish soldier

== See also ==
- Garrett Standish Barry (1788–1864), Irish politician
- Garrett Berry (born 2003), American racing driver
