= Evan Giltaire =

French racing driver (born 2006)

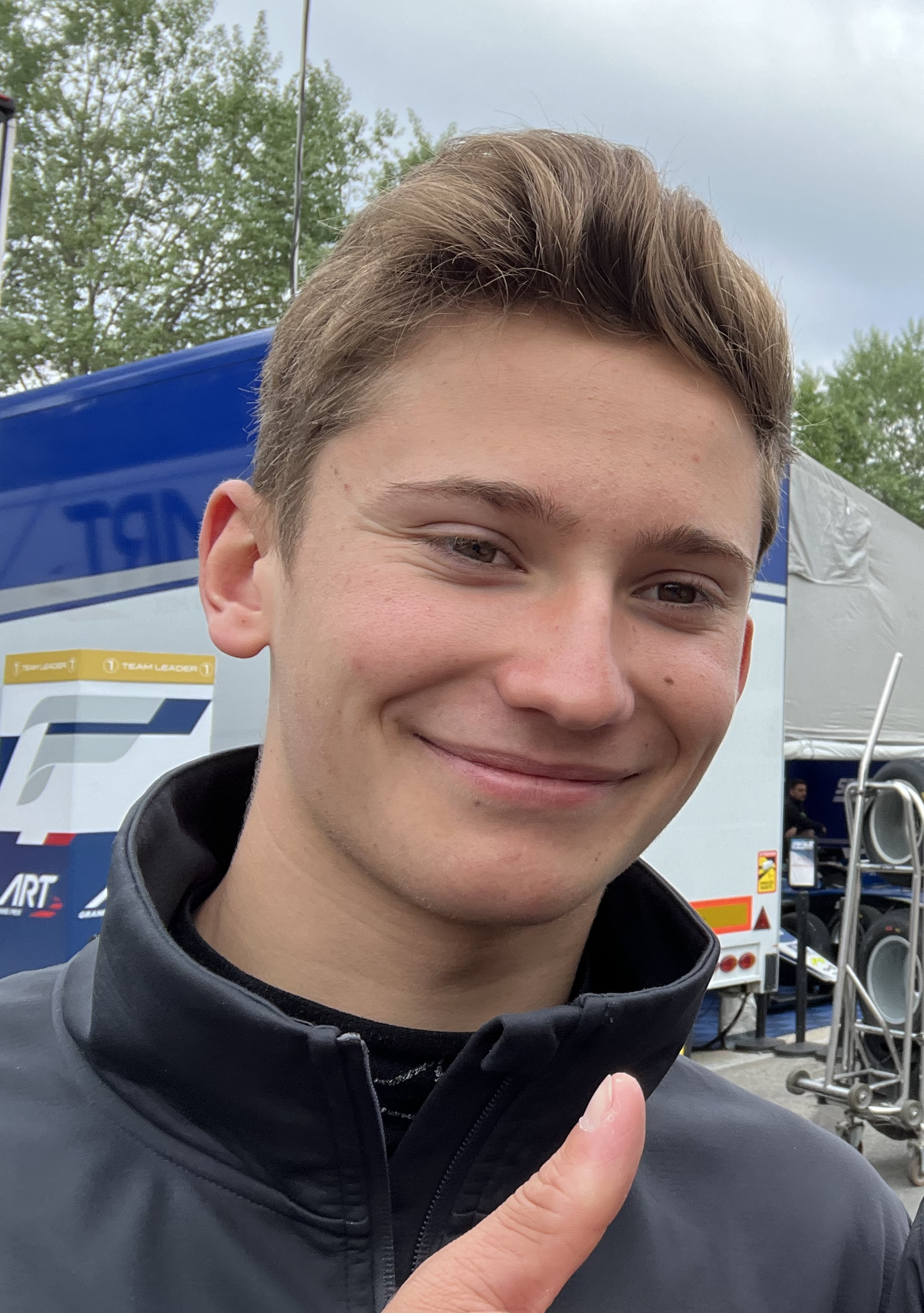
- Giltaire in 2025
- Nationality: (France) French
- Born: 21 November 2006 (age 19) Moussy-le-Neuf, Senlis, Oise, France

Super Formula Lights career
- Debut season: 2026
- Current team: B-Max Racing Team
- Categorisation: FIA Silver
- Car number: 1
- Starts: 18
- Wins: 5
- Podiums: 14
- Poles: 2
- Fastest laps: 3
- Best finish: 1st in 2026

Previous series
- 2025 2023–2025 2023: FR Middle East; FR European; French F4

Championship titles
- 2026 2025 2023: Super Formula Lights; FR Middle East; French F4

Evan Giltaire (born 21 November 2006) is a French racing driver.

Giltaire is the reigning Super Formula Lights champion for B-Max Racing Team. He was also the 2023 French F4 and 2025 Formula Regional Middle East champion. He previously competed in the Formula Regional European Championship for ART Grand Prix.

== Career ==
=== Karting (2018–2023) ===
Giltaire began competitively karting in 2018, where he came seventh in the French Championship in his class, and 11th in the Rotax Max Challenge Grand Finals. Giltaire had his breakout year in karting in 2022, where he won the SKUSA SuperNationals XXV and the IAME Warriors Final in the X30 Senior classes. Giltaire came fourth in the IAME Euro Series in the X30 Senior category, and came fifth in the CIK-FIA Karting European Championship.

In 2023, Giltaire combined his French F4 Championship campaign winning year with karting and came third in the IAME Winter Cup in the X30 Senior class. Throughout his karting career he also competed in various WSK events and in the contested the CIK-FIA Karting World Championship various times but had little success.

=== Formula 4 (2023) ===
After being a finalist of the 2022 Richard Mille Young Talent Academy shootout, Giltaire made his single-seater debut in the 2023 French F4 Championship where he was instantly in the title fight with compatriot, Enzo Peugeot and Canadian 2022 FEED Racing winner, Kevin Foster. In his campaign he claimed 6 wins, 8 poles and 13 podiums and fought with Peugeot until the final race at Circuit Paul Ricard he pipped Peugeot to the title by four points.

=== Formula Regional (2023–2026) ===
==== 2023 ====
After his title winning campaign, Giltaire would compete in the final two rounds of the 2023 Formula Regional European Championship with ART Grand Prix, as a guest driver. Giltaire would have a highest finish of 11th place, achieved at the second race of his debut round at Circuit Zandvoort. He would place third out of nine guest drivers in the championship standings.

==== 2024 ====
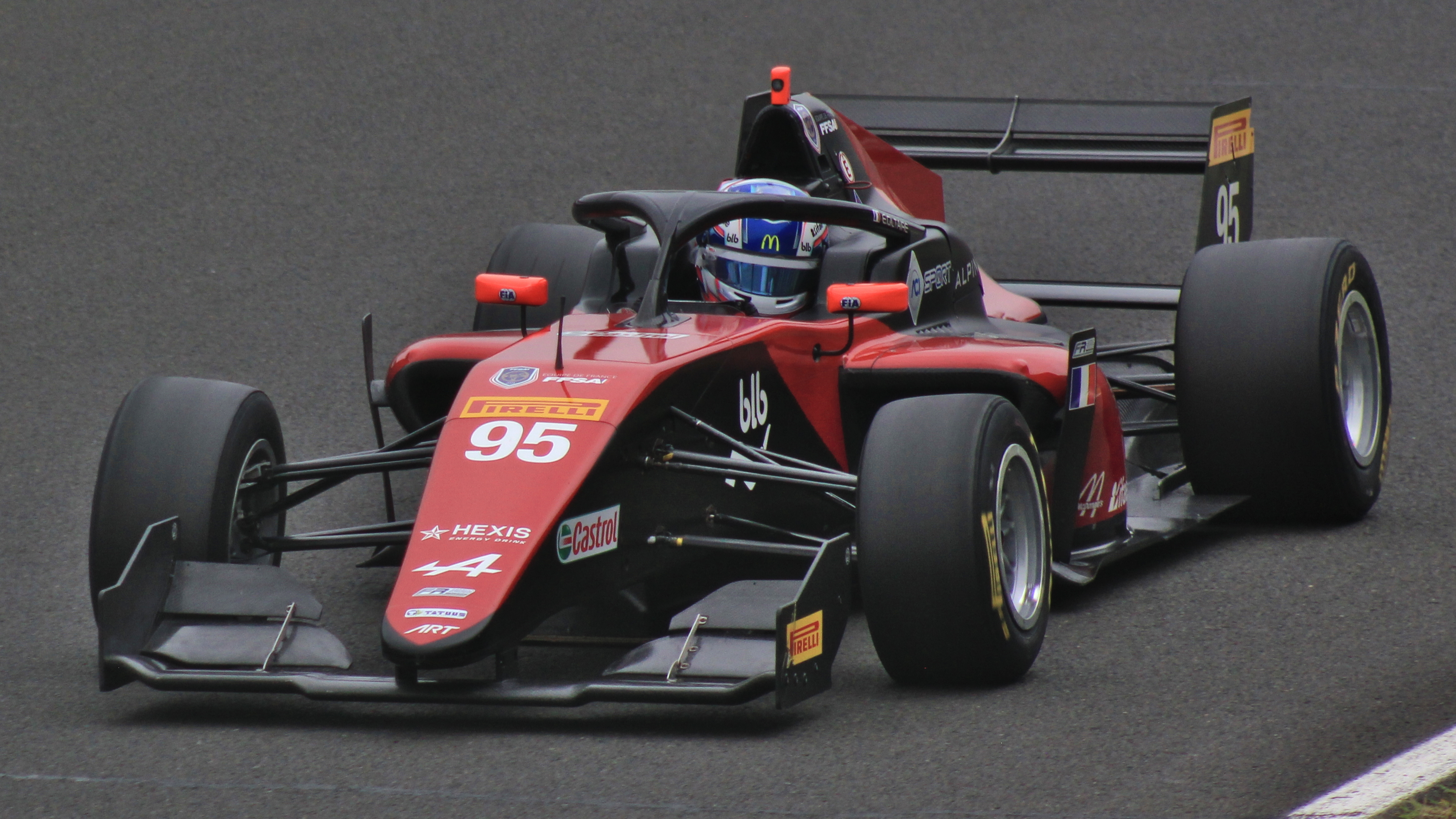
Giltaire driving in the 2024 Formula Regional European Championship at the Hungaroring

For 2024, Giltaire moved up to the 2024 Formula Regional European Championship full-time for ART Grand Prix. He retired from the first race at the Hockenheimring, but won the second race, marking his maiden Formula Regional win. Seven rounds later after only a small handful of points finishes, he got his second and final podium of the year at the first race at the Red Bull Ring. Giltaire wouldn't get his next points finish until the penultimate race of his campaign at Monza Circuit with a fifth place. He came seventh in the drivers championship with 97 points.

Giltaire competed in the 2024 Macau Grand Prix, again with ART. He finished ninth in both qualifying and the qualifying race, but did not finish the main race due to an accident on lap 1.

==== 2025 ====
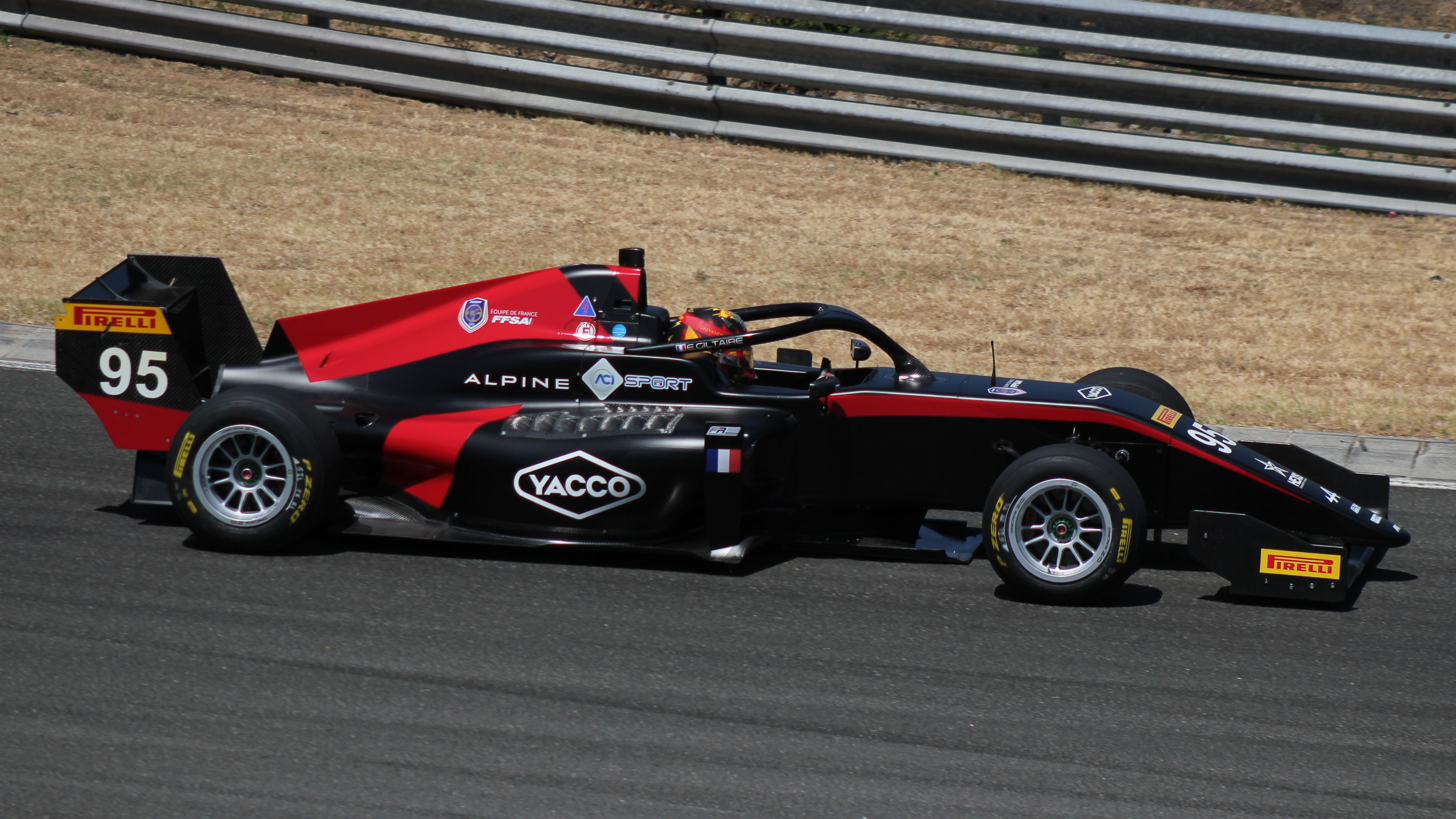
Giltaire driving at the Hungaroring during the 2025 Formula Regional European Championship

Giltaire remained with ART Grand Prix for 2025, contesting the Formula Regional Middle East Championship and the Formula Regional European Championship with the team.

Giltaire clinched the Formula Regional Middle East Championship during race 2 at the Lusail International Circuit following a title battle with Freddie Slater. He collected three wins, five pole positions, two fastest lap, eight podiums and 264 points during his title charge.

After finishing fifth in his sophomore campaign of FRECA, Giltaire recounted the season as "frustrating", and stated that he aimed to moved to Super Formula Lights in 2026.

==== 2026 ====
At the end of November, Giltaire returned to ART Grand Prix for the Macau Grand Prix.

=== Super Formula Lights (2026) ===
In March 2026, Giltaire confirmed his move to Super Formula Lights for the 2026 season, joining B-Max Racing Team. He got on the podium in his debut race at the opening round at Fuji Speedway and achieved his maiden win in the series in the second race. A round later at Autopolis, he achieved double wins in the second and third races. The Frenchman collected sporadic podiums in the next few rounds until the final round at Mobility Resort Motegi, where he dominated the round, getting his first pole positions, converting them into wins and winning the final race as he sealed the championship to become the first non-Japanese Super Formula Lights title winner.

== Karting record ==
=== Karting career summary ===
Season	Series	Team	Position
2018	National Series Karting — Cadet		27th
2018	French Championship — Cadet		7th
2018	Rotax Max Challenge Grand Finals — Mini Max	Christophe Giltaire	11th
2019	24° South Garda Winter Cup — OKJ	Sodikart	69th
2019	48° Trofeo delle Industrie — OKJ	Sodikart	21st
2019	WSK Super Master Series — OKJ	Sodikart	48th
2019	WSK Euro Series — OKJ	Sodikart	57th
2019	National Series Karting — Nationale		21st
2019	CIK-FIA Karting European Championship — OKJ	Sodikart	30th
2019	CIK-FIA Karting World Championship — OKJ	Sodikart	17th
2019	WSK Open Cup — OKJ	Sodikart	65th
2020	25° South Garda Winter Cup — OKJ	Sodikart	13th
2020	WSK Super Master Series — OKJ	Sodikart	27th
2020	Rotax Max Challenge International Trophy — Junior		34th
2021	WSK Champions Cup — OK	VDK Racing	26th
2021	WSK Super Master Series — OK	VDK Racing	42nd
2021	WSK Euro Series — OK	VDK Racing	28th
2021	IAME Euro Series — X30 Senior	VDK Racing	31st
2021	Champions of the Future — OK	VDK Racing	17th
2021	CIK-FIA Karting European Championship — OK	VDK Racing	6th
2021	CIK-FIA Karting World Championship — OK	VDK Racing	21st
2022	IAME Winter Cup — X30 Senior	VDK Racing	12th
2022	Kartmasters British Grand Prix — X30 Senior	Argenti Motorsport	16th
2022	IAME Euro Series — X30 Senior	VDK Racing	4th
2022	CIK-FIA Karting European Championship — OK	VDK Racing	5th
2022	CIK-FIA Karting World Championship — OK	VDK Racing	14th
2022	IAME Warriors Final — X30 Senior	VDK Racing	1st
2022	SKUSA SuperNationals — X30 Senior	Kart Republic Motorsport	1st
2023	IAME Winter Cup — X30 Senior	PB Kart	3rd
2023	IAME Euro Series — X30 Senior	PB Kart	12th

== Racing record ==
=== Racing career summary ===
Season	Series	Team	Races	Wins	Poles	F/Laps	Podiums	Points	Position
2023	French F4 Championship	FFSA Academy	21	6	8	8	13	317	**1st**
2023	Formula Regional European Championship	ART Grand Prix	4	0	0	0	0	0	NC†
2024	Formula Regional European Championship	ART Grand Prix	20	1	0	1	2	97	7th
2024	Macau Grand Prix	ART Grand Prix	1	0	0	0	0	—N/a	DNF
2025	Formula Regional Middle East Championship	ART Grand Prix	14	3	5	2	8	264	**1st**
2025	Formula Regional European Championship	ART Grand Prix	20	1	2	0	5	185	5th
2025	Macau Grand Prix	ART Grand Prix	1	0	0	0	0	—N/a	6th
2026	Super Formula Lights	B-Max Racing Team	18	6	2	4	15	110.5	**1st**
2026	Macau Grand Prix	ART Grand Prix	0	0	0	0	0	—N/a	TBD

† As Giltaire was a guest driver, he was ineligible for points.
* Season still in progress.

=== Complete French F4 Championship results ===
(key) (Races in bold indicate pole position) (Races in italics indicate fastest lap)

Year	1	2	3	4	5	6	7	8	9	10	11	12	13	14	15	16	17	18	19	20	21	Pos	Points
2023	**NOG**; **1**; 1	NOG; 2; 4	**NOG**; **3**; 2	**MAG**; **1**; 1	MAG; 2; 4	**MAG**; **3**; 16	PAU; 1; 2	PAU; 2 Ret	PAU; 3; 2	**SPA**; **1**; 1	SPA; 2; 7	**SPA**; **3**; 1	MIS; 1; 2	MIS; 2; 7	MIS; 3; 2	LÉD; 1; 6	LÉD; 2; 3	LÉD; 3; 3	**LEC**; **1**; 1	LEC; 2; 4	**LEC**; **3**; 1	1st	317

=== Complete Formula Regional European Championship results ===
(key) (Races in bold indicate pole position) (Races in italics indicate fastest lap)

Year	Team	1	2	3	4	5	6	7	8	9	10	11	12	13	14	15	16	17	18	19	20	DC	Points
2023	ART Grand Prix	IMO; 1	IMO; 2	CAT; 1	CAT; 2	HUN; 1	HUN; 2	SPA; 1	SPA; 2	MUG; 1	MUG; 2	LEC; 1	LEC; 2	RBR; 1	RBR; 2	MNZ; 1	MNZ; 2	ZAN; 1; 21	ZAN; 2; 11	HOC; 1; 22	HOC; 2; 15	NC†	0
2024	ART Grand Prix	HOC; 1 Ret	HOC; 2; 1	SPA; 1; 12	SPA; 2; 6	ZAN; 1; 5	ZAN; 2; 11	HUN; 1; 5	HUN; 2; 13	MUG; 1; 22	MUG; 2; 21	LEC; 1; 8	LEC; 2; 4	IMO; 1; 14	IMO; 2 Ret	RBR; 1; 2	RBR; 2; 11	CAT; 1; 15	CAT; 2; 12	MNZ; 1; 5	MNZ; 2; 11	7th	97
2025	ART Grand Prix	MIS; 1; 2	**MIS**; **2**; 1	SPA; 1; 4	SPA; 2; 13	ZAN; 1; 4	ZAN; 2; 16	HUN; 1; 7	HUN; 2; 5	LEC; 1; 9	LEC; 2; 7	IMO; 1; 15	IMO; 2; 6	RBR; 1; 9	RBR; 2; 7	CAT; 1; 7	CAT; 2; 4	HOC; 1; 4	HOC; 2; 3	**MNZ**; **1**; 2	MNZ; 2; 3	5th	185

† As Giltaire was a guest driver, he was ineligible for points.

=== Complete Macau Grand Prix results ===
Year	Team	Car	Qualifying	Quali Race	Main Race
2024	(France) ART Grand Prix	Tatuus F3 T-318	9th	9th	DNF
2025	(France) ART Grand Prix	Tatuus F3 T-318	**3rd**	4th	6th
2026	(France) ART Grand Prix	Tatuus T-326	TBD	TBD	TBD

=== Complete Formula Regional Middle East Championship results ===
(key) (Races in bold indicate pole position) (Races in italics indicate fastest lap)

Year	Entrant	1	2	3	4	5	6	7	8	9	10	11	12	13	14	15	DC	Points
2025	ART Grand Prix	YMC1; 1; 3	YMC1; 2; 7	YMC1; 3; 2	YMC2; 1; 1	YMC2; 2 DNS	**YMC2**; **3**; 1	**DUB**; **1**; 3	DUB; 2; 4	**DUB**; **3**; 1	**YMC3**; **1**; 3	YMC3; 2; 7	YMC3; 3; 2	**LUS**; **1**; 6	LUS; 2; 4	LUS; 3; 6	1st	264

=== Complete Super Formula Lights results ===
(key) (Races in bold indicate pole position) (Races in italics indicate fastest lap)

Year	Entrant	1	2	3	4	5	6	7	8	9	10	11	12	13	14	15	16	17	18	Pos	Points
2026	B-Max Racing Team	FUJ; 1; 3	FUJ; 2; 1	FUJ; 3; 3	AUT; 1; 3	AUT; 2; 1	AUT; 3; 1	SUZ; 1; 2	SUZ; 2; 7	SUZ; 3 Ret	OKA; 1; 3	OKA; 2; 6	OKA; 3; 3	SUG; 1; 2	SUG; 2; 3	SUG; 3; 2	**MOT**; **1**; 1	**MOT**; **2**; 1	MOT; 3; 1	1st	110.5

Sporting positions
Preceded by Alessandro Giusti	French F4 Championship; Champion; 2024	Succeeded by Taito Kato
Preceded by Yuto Nomura	Super Formula Lights; Champion; 2026	Succeeded by Incumbent
