= Adrien Closmenil =

French racing driver (born 2007)

- Closmenil at Silverstone Circuit in 2026.
- Nationality: (France) French
- Born: 19 January 2007 (age 19) Bayeux, France

European Le Mans Series career
- Debut season: 2025
- Current team: CLX Motorsport
- Categorisation: FIA Silver
- Car number: 17
- Starts: 12 (12 entries)
- Wins: 5
- Podiums: 5
- Poles: 3
- Fastest laps: 3
- Best finish: 1st in 2025 (LMP3)

Previous series
- 2024 2023: Le Mans Cup - LMP3; French F4 Championship

Championship titles
- 2025: European Le Mans Series – LMP3

Adrien Closmenil (born 19 January 2007) is a French racing driver who last competed in the LMP2 class of the European Le Mans Series for CLX Motorsport.

== Career ==
Closmenil started karting in 2015, where he immediately won the Coupe CRK in the Mini class of the French Championship in Angerville. Years in the Mini, Cadet, and eventually OK-Junior followed, with Closmenil branching out onto the international stage in 2021 and 2022.

The following year, Closmenil made his car racing debut in the French F4 Championship as one of three drivers supported by the Winfield Racing School. At the second round in Magny-Cours, the reversed-top-ten starting format for race 2 allowed Closmenil to start from pole. A slow start meant he dropped behind Leonardo Megna, though Closmenil quickly got back ahead. He defended the place against Megna until the end, claiming his first car racing victory in the process. Chaos ensued at Pau, where Closmenil was taken out in a multi-car incident during race 2; a subsequent engine examination ruled him out of competing in race 3. Further retirements at Spa, Lédenon, and Le Castellet blighted the second half of his campaign, which Closmenil finished 13th overall.

For 2024, Closmenil moved into sports car racing, more precisely the LMP3 category. He joined Cool Racing and bronze-ranked James Sweetnam in the Le Mans Cup. He also made appearances in the Ultimate Cup Series, taking an LMP3 pole for the season-opening Paul Ricard race and winning three races as part of the Challenge Monoplace in a Tatuus FR-19 single-seater. The Le Mans Cup season meanwhile began with fourth place in Barcelona and 12th at Paul Ricard. At the Road to Le Mans event, Closmenil took pole position for race 1 in the season's only qualifying session open to non-amateur drivers. Contact on the opening lap forced the No. 87 Cool Racing entry out of the race. Closmenil scored his first sports car podium in Spa, finishing second after a frantic final lap and multiple penalties. Points results in the final two races put Closmenil and Sweetnam into fifth place overall.

Closmenil progressed into the European Le Mans Series in 2025, piloting the new Ligier JS P325 at the renamed CLX Motorsport alongside Theodor Jensen and bronze Paul Lanchère. Having taken pole for the season-opening Barcelona round, Closmenil secured the win by passing Matthieu Lahaye with an hour to go and holding off Gillian Henrion during the final two laps following a safety car restart. He repeated this feat in Le Castellet, claiming a dominant pole position and winning after leading during the final stint. Closmenil's success continued at that year's Road to Le Mans event, where he and Theodor Jensen drove a guest entry for CLX: after Jensen progressed from ninth to fifth in the opening laps, Closmenil came out second following the pit stops. He chased down Hadrien David and soon passed him to take victory in race 1. Imola saw Jensen earn his maiden ELMS pole position, before Closmenil and his teammates overcame an early penalty to win for a third time. Another Jensen pole followed at Spa, though the race proved to be tricky, as the CLX crew served multiple penalties. Closmenil still managed to claw his way back to third, though his attempt to close in on second-placed Ian Aguilera was ended when he suddenly went off and subsequently stopped the car after being recovered to the track. This was rendered irrelevant at Silverstone, where a dominant performance allowed Closmenil, Jensen, and Lanchère to win the championship with a race to spare. Closmenil inherited his third pole of the year at Portimão when the RLR MSport entry was disqualified, before the team closed out a commanding campaign with their fifth victory from six races.

In 2026, Closmenil moved up to CLX Motorsport's LMP2 programme in the European Le Mans Series, partnering fellow LMP3 graduates Jensen and Aguilera. In his maiden season in the category, Closmenil took a best result of fifth at Silverstone and also raced at the 24 Hours of Le Mans with his ELMS teammates, as the youngest-ever trio to race at the French enduro. Towards the end of the year, Closmenil partook in the European Le Mans Series rookie tests for CLX in LMP3. Following that, Closmenil raced for CLX in the LMP2 class of the 2026–27 Asian Le Mans Series.

== Karting record ==
=== Karting career summary ===
Season	Series	Team	Position
2015	Championnat de France – Mini Kart	Closmenil	34th
2015	Challenge Rotax Max France – Mini Kart		5th
2016	Coupe de France – Mini Kart	DSM	24th
2016	Challenge Rotax Max France – Mini Kart	DSM	10th
2016	24H Karting Le Mans – Mini Kart		10th
2017	Coupe de France – Cadet	DSM	NC
2017	Championnat de France – Cadet	DSM	56th
2017	24 Minutes Karting Le Mans – Cadet		9th
2018	National Series Karting – Cadet		44th
2018	Championnat de France – Cadet	DSM	27th
2018	Challenge Rotax Max France – Cadet	DSM	18th
2018	24 Minutes Karting Le Mans – OK		5th
2019	National Series Karting – Cadet	DSM	20th
2019	Championnat de France – Cadet	DSM	10th
2020	Open Kart – Cadet		3rd
2020	IAME Series France – X30 Junior		31st
2020	National Series Karting – Cadet	DSM	14th
2021	IAME Euro Series – X30 Junior	Privateer; CQR (Note: Closmenil competed as a Privateer in round 2 and ran for CQR in round 4.)	38th
2021	Champions of the Future – OK-J	CQR	113th
2022	IAME Euro Series – X30 Senior	DSM	109th
2022	Championnat de France – Senior	DSM	7th
2022	IAME Warriors Final – X30 Senior	DSM	NC

== Racing record ==
=== Racing career summary ===
Season	Series	Team	Races	Wins	Poles	F/Laps	Podiums	Points	Position
2023	French F4 Championship	FFSA Academy	21	1	0	0	1	30	13th
2024	Le Mans Cup – LMP3	Cool Racing	7	0	1	1	1	52	5th
2024	European Endurance Prototype Cup – LMP3	Cool Racing	3	0	1	2	0	25	15th
2024	Ultimate Cup Series Challenge Monoplace – F3R (13 inch)	Thunder by Winfield Racing	3	1	2	3	2	64	13th
2024	Ultimate Cup Series Challenge Monoplace – F3R (13 inch)	Winfield Racing	3	2	2	2	2	64	13th
2025	European Le Mans Series – LMP3	CLX Motorsport	6	5	3	3	5	130	**1st**
2025	Le Mans Cup – LMP3	CLX Motorsport	2	1	0	0	1	0	NC†
2026	European Le Mans Series – LMP2	CLX Motorsport	6	0	0	0	0	36	9th
2026	24 Hours of Le Mans – LMP2	CLX Motorsport	1	0	0	0	0	—N/a	5th
2026	European Endurance Prototype Cup	ANS Motorsport	2	0	0	0	0	2.5*	55th*
2026–27	Asian Le Mans Series – LMP2	CLX Motorsport							

*Season still in progress.

=== Complete French F4 Championship results ===
(key) (Races in bold indicate pole position; races in italics indicate fastest lap)

Year	1	2	3	4	5	6	7	8	9	10	11	12	13	14	15	16	17	18	19	20	21	DC	Points
2023	NOG; 1; 15	NOG; 2; 17	NOG; 3; 11	MAG; 1; 11	MAG; 2; 1	MAG; 3; 9	PAU; 1; 8	PAU; 2 Ret	PAU; 3 Ret	SPA; 1; 9	SPA; 2; 10	SPA; 3 Ret	MIS; 1; 13	MIS; 2; 9	MIS; 3; 11	LÉD; 1 Ret	LÉD; 2 Ret	LÉD; 3; 7	LEC; 1; 10	LEC; 2 Ret	LEC; 3; 11	13th	30

=== Complete Le Mans Cup results ===
(key) (Races in bold indicate pole position; results in italics indicate fastest lap)

Year	Entrant	Class	Chassis	1	2	3	4	5	6	7	Rank	Points
2024	Cool Racing	LMP3	Ligier JS P320	CAT; 4	LEC; 12	**LMS**; **1** Ret	LMS; 2; 8	SPA; 2	MUG; 6	ALG; 5	5th	52

=== Complete European Le Mans Series results ===
(key) (Races in bold indicate pole position; results in italics indicate fastest lap)

Year	Entrant	Class	Chassis	Engine	1	2	3	4	5	6	Rank	Points
2025	CLX Motorsport	LMP3	Ligier JS P325	Toyota V35A 3.5 L V6	**CAT**; 1	**LEC**; 1	**IMO**; 1	**SPA**; Ret	SIL; 1	**ALG**; 1	1st	130
2026	CLX Motorsport	LMP2	Oreca 07	Gibson GK428 4.2 L V8	CAT; 8	LEC; 6	IMO; 9	SPA; 7	SIL; 5	ALG; 7	9th	36

^{*} Season still in progress.

=== Complete 24 Hours of Le Mans results ===
Year	Team	Co-Drivers	Car	Class	Laps	Pos.	Class Pos.
2026	(Switzerland) CLX Motorsport	(Mexico) Ian Aguilera (Denmark) Theodor Jensen	Oreca 07-Gibson	LMP2	360	19th	5th
