= Enzo Peugeot =

French and Japanese racing driver (born 2005)

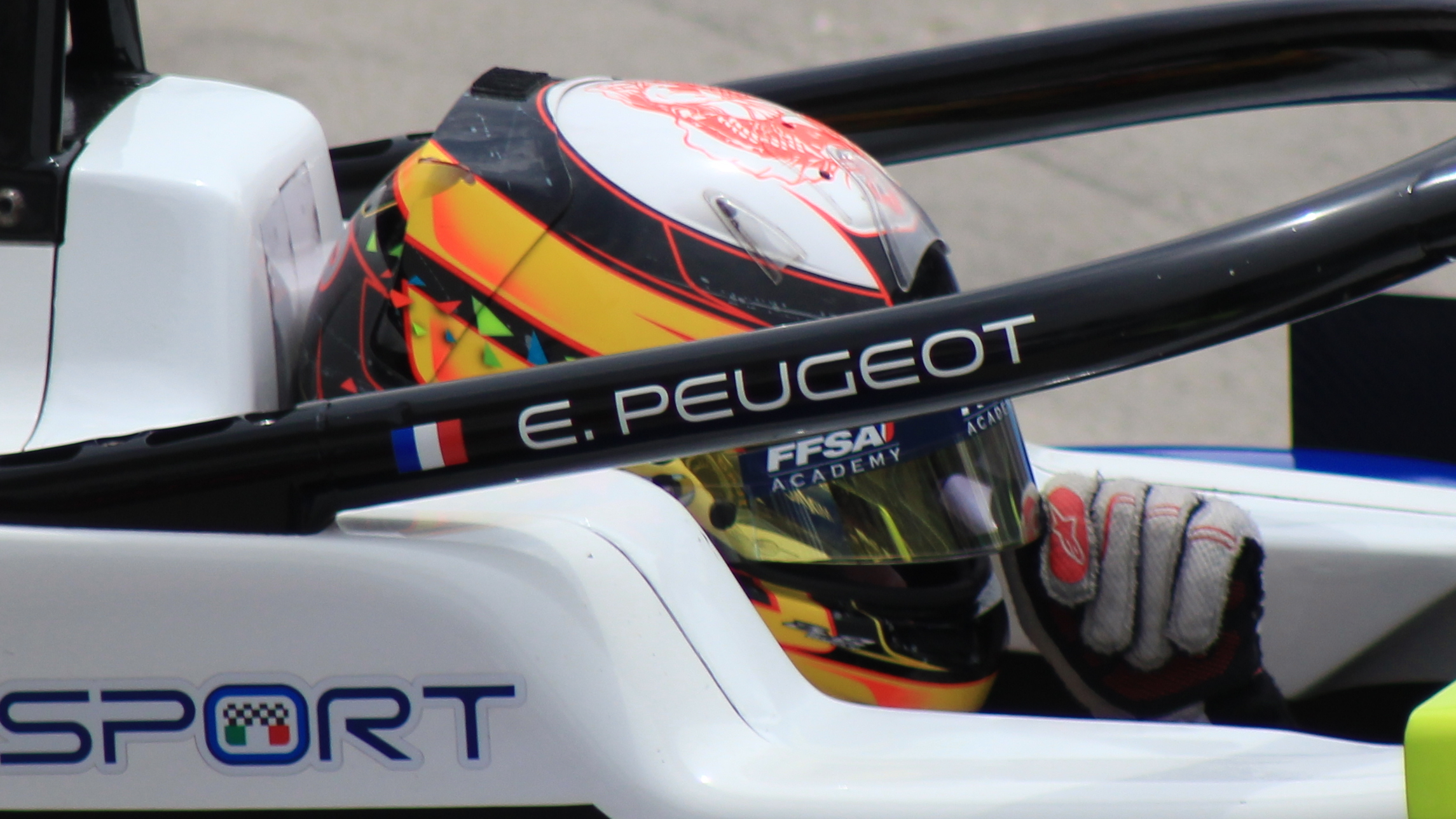
- Peugeot in 2024
- Nationality: (France) French
- Born: 21 December 2005 (age 20) Beaune, Côte d'Or, France
- Relatives: Laurent Peugeot (father)

Le Mans Cup career
- Debut season: 2026
- Current team: R-ace GP
- Categorisation: FIA Silver
- Car number: 85
- Starts: 4
- Wins: 2
- Podiums: 3
- Poles: 1
- Fastest laps: 0

Previous series
- 2024–2025 2024 2021–2023: Formula Regional European Championship; FR Middle East; French F4
- Statistics up to date as of 27 August 2026.

Enzo Peugeot (born 21 December 2005) is a French racing driver of Japanese descent competing in the LMP3 class of the Le Mans Cup for R-ace GP. He previously raced in the Formula Regional European Championship for Saintéloc and RPM, and was French F4 runner-up in 2023.

== Personal life ==
Peugeot is the son of Michelin-starred chef Laurent Peugeot. His mother is Japanese.

== Career ==
=== Karting ===
Peugeot won a few titles in his national category, namely the 2019 BNL Karting Series and the 2020 French Championship.

=== Formula 4 ===
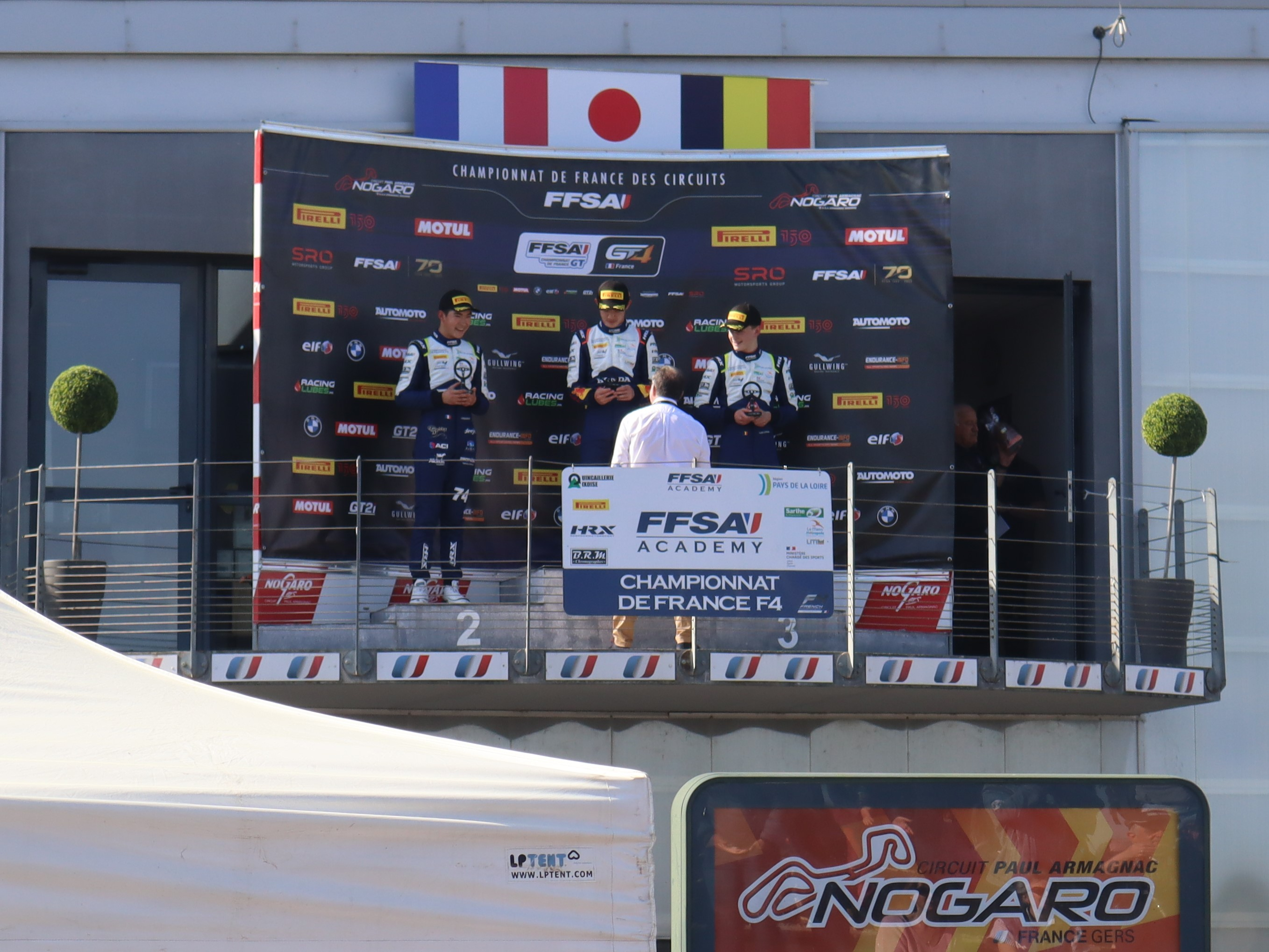
Peugeot (left) in 2022

==== 2021 ====
Peugeot made his single-seater debut at the season finale in Circuit de Nevers Magny-Cours during the 2021 French F4 Championship.

==== 2022 ====
Peugeot moved into racing cars for 2022, racing in the 2022 French F4 Championship. He took his first podium in only his second race, but had to wait until the fourth round to stand on the podium again, where he took his maiden win in the series at Spa-Francorchamps. Peugeot would take another win in Valencia, and finished fifth in the standings.

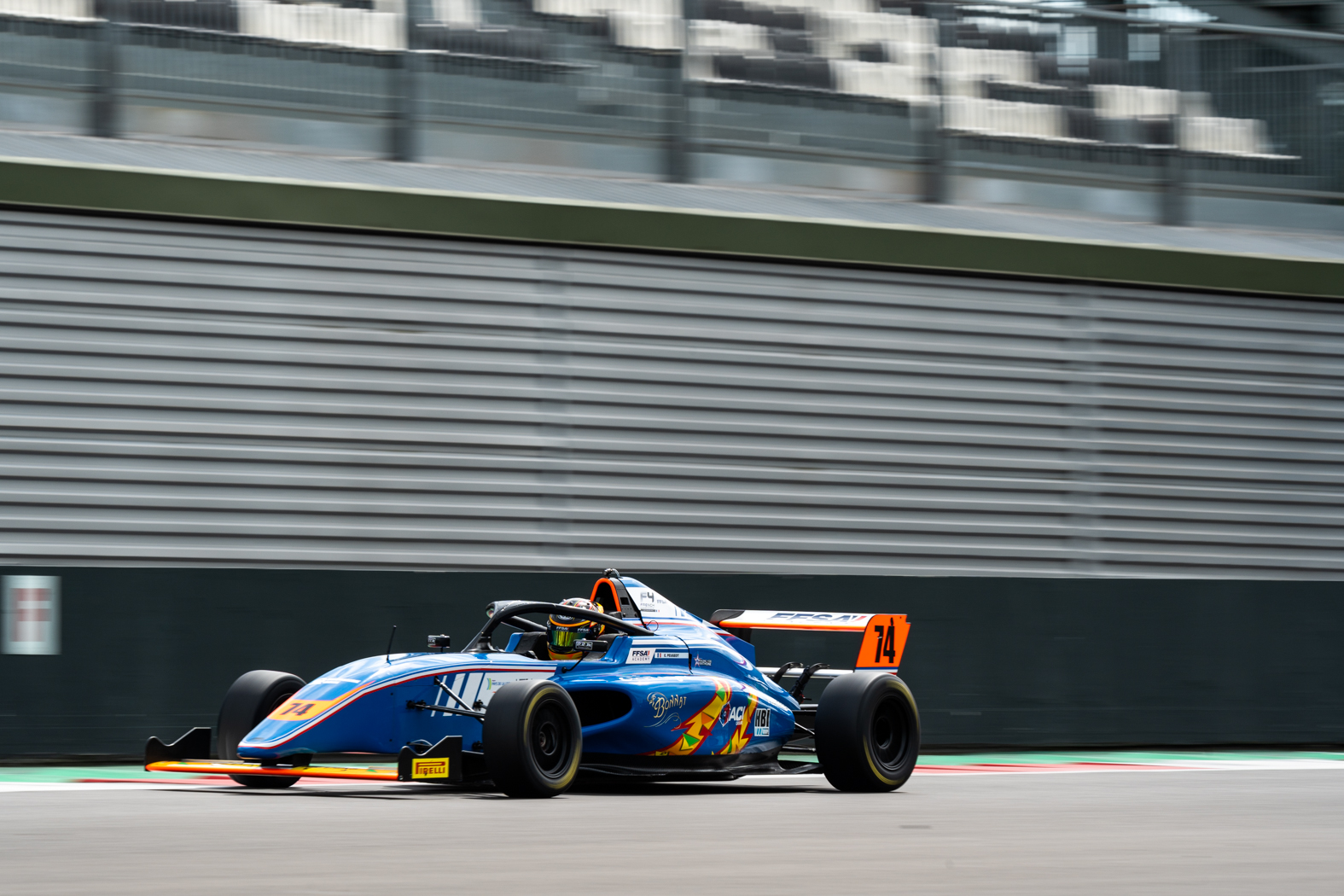
Peugeot in 2023

==== 2023 ====
Peugeot remained in French F4 for 2023. He had to wait until round 3 at the Pau Grand Prix, in which he claimed a double victory. The next three rounds would see Peugeot winning five races compared to title rival Evan Giltaire's two, leaping him 14 points ahead of his rival into the season finale in Circuit Paul Ricard. However, a double win from Giltaire in addition to Peugeot not winning and a further DNF meant that the former would clinch the title by a mere four points.

=== Formula Regional ===
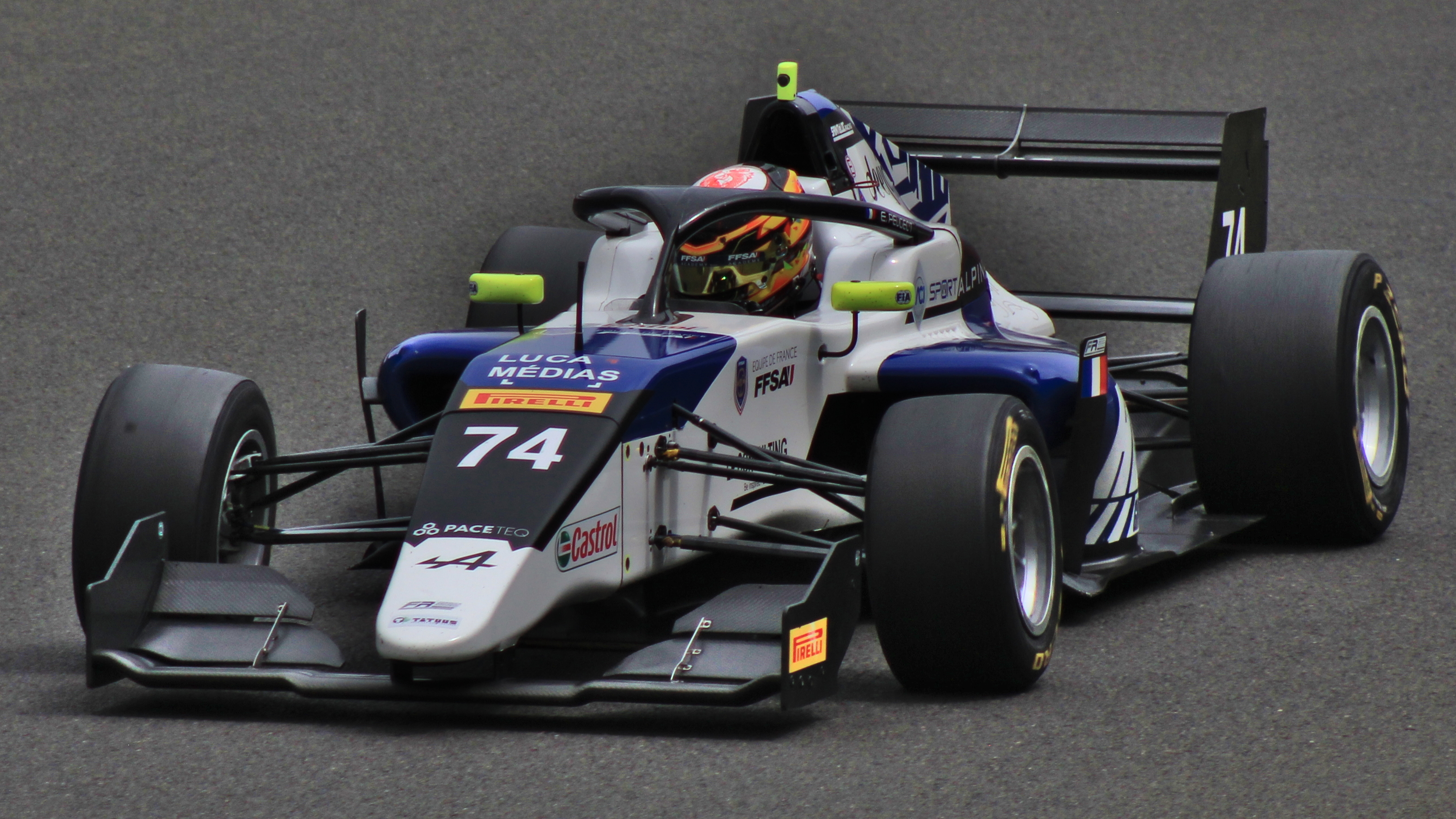
Peugeot driving at the Red Bull Ring during the 2024 Formula Regional European Championship

==== 2024 ====
Peugeot stepped up to the Formula Regional European Championship in 2024 with Saintéloc Racing.

==== 2025 ====
In 2025, Peugeot switched to RPM for his sophomore season in the championship. After failing to score points during the first three rounds, he parted ways with the team and was replaced by Ean Eyckmans.

== Karting record ==
=== Karting career summary ===
Season	Series	Team	Position
2019	WSK Super Master Series — OKJ	VDK Racing	NC
2019	CIK-FIA European Championship — OKJ	VDK Racing	NC
2019	WSK Euro Series — OKJ	BM Karting Team ASD	43rd
2019	CIK-FIA World Championship — OKJ	Forza Racing	NC
2019	BNL Karting Series — OKJ		1st
2020	French Championship — Junior		1st
2021	Championnat de France F4 FFSA Academy		NC
2021	IAME Euro Series — X30 Senior	PB Kart	38th
2021	IAME Winter Cup — X30 Senior	PB Kart	20th

== Racing record ==
=== Racing career summary ===
Season	Series	Team	Races	Wins	Poles	F/Laps	Podiums	Points	Position
2021	French F4 Championship	FFSA Academy	3	0	0	0	0	—N/a	NC†
2022	French F4 Championship	FFSA Academy	21	2	0	1	3	149	5th
2023	French F4 Championship	FFSA Academy	21	7	4	5	13	313	**2nd**
2024	Formula Regional Middle East Championship	Saintéloc Racing	6	0	0	0	0	0	25th
2024	Formula Regional European Championship	Saintéloc Racing	20	0	0	0	0	60	13th
2025	Formula Regional European Championship	RPM	6	0	0	0	0	0	22nd
2026	Le Mans Cup - LMP3	R-ace GP	6	3	2	3	5	131	**1st**

^{†} As Peugeot was a guest driver, he was ineligible to score points.
^{*} Season still in progress.

=== Complete French F4 Championship results ===
(key) (Races in bold indicate pole position) (Races in italics indicate fastest lap)

Year	1	2	3	4	5	6	7	8	9	10	11	12	13	14	15	16	17	18	19	20	21	DC	Points
2021	NOG; 1	NOG; 2	NOG; 3	MAG1; 1	MAG1; 2	MAG1; 3	HUN; 1	HUN; 2	HUN; 3	LÉD; 1	LÉD; 2	LÉD; 3	MNZ; 1	MNZ; 2	MNZ; 3	LEC; 1	LEC; 2	LEC; 3	MAG2; 1; 12	MAG2; 2; 6	MAG2; 3; 9	NC†	0
2022	NOG; 1; 8	NOG; 2; 2	NOG; 3; 13	PAU; 1; 4	PAU; 2; 14	PAU; 3; 17	MAG; 1; 6	MAG; 2; 6	MAG; 3; 7	SPA; 1; 5	SPA; 2; 1	SPA; 3; 11	LÉD; 1; 19	LÉD; 2; 6	LÉD; 3; 4	CRT; 1; 6	CRT; 2; 1	CRT; 3; 5	LEC; 1; 4	LEC; 2; 8	LEC; 3; 6	5th	149
2023	NOG; 1; 3	NOG; 2; 2	NOG; 3; 5	MAG; 1; 3	MAG; 2; 6	MAG; 3; 5	PAU; 1; 1	PAU; 2; 2	PAU; 3; 1	SPA; 1; 6	SPA; 2; 1	SPA; 3; 3	**MIS**; **1**; 1	MIS; 2; 5	**MIS**; **3**; 1	**LÉD**; **1**; 1	LÉD; 2; 7	**LÉD**; **3**; 1	LEC; 1; 4	LEC; 2 Ret	LEC; 3; 2	2nd	313

^{†} As Peugeot was a guest driver, he was ineligible to score points.

=== Complete Formula Regional Middle East Championship results ===
(key) (Races in bold indicate pole position) (Races in italics indicate fastest lap)

Year	Entrant	1	2	3	4	5	6	7	8	9	10	11	12	13	14	15	DC	Points
2024	Saintéloc Racing	YMC1; 1	YMC1; 2	YMC1; 3	YMC2; 1	YMC2; 2	YMC2; 3	DUB1; 1	DUB1; 2	DUB1; 3	YMC3; 1; 16	YMC3; 2; 12	YMC3; 3 Ret	DUB2; 1; 12	DUB2; 2; 11	DUB2; 3; 17	25th	0

=== Complete Formula Regional European Championship results ===
(key) (Races in bold indicate pole position) (Races in italics indicate fastest lap)

Year	Team	1	2	3	4	5	6	7	8	9	10	11	12	13	14	15	16	17	18	19	20	DC	Points
2024	Saintéloc Racing	HOC; 1; 16	HOC; 2; 24	SPA; 1; 6	SPA; 2; 9	ZAN; 1; 9	ZAN; 2; 8	HUN; 1; 6	HUN; 2; 24	MUG; 1; 16	MUG; 2; 11	LEC; 1; 12	LEC; 2; 23	IMO; 1 Ret	IMO; 2 Ret	RBR; 1; 5	RBR; 2; 12	CAT; 1; 7	CAT; 2; 7	MNZ; 1; 8	MNZ; 2; 5	13th	60
2025	RPM	MIS; 1; 13	MIS; 2; 11	SPA; 1; 11	SPA; 2; 11	ZAN; 1; 14	ZAN; 2; 11	HUN; 1	HUN; 2	LEC; 1	LEC; 2	IMO; 1	IMO; 2	RBR; 1	RBR; 2	CAT; 1	CAT; 2	HOC; 1	HOC; 2	MNZ; 1	MNZ; 2	22nd	0

=== Complete Le Mans Cup results ===
(key) (Races in bold indicate pole position; results in italics indicate fastest lap)

Year	Entrant	Class	Chassis	1	2	3	4	5	6	Rank	Points
2026	R-ace GP	LMP3	Duqueine D09	**BAR**; 1	LEC; 2	LMS; 4	SPA; 1	SIL; 2	POR; 1	1st	131

^{*} Season still in progress.
