= Garrett Berry =

American racing driver

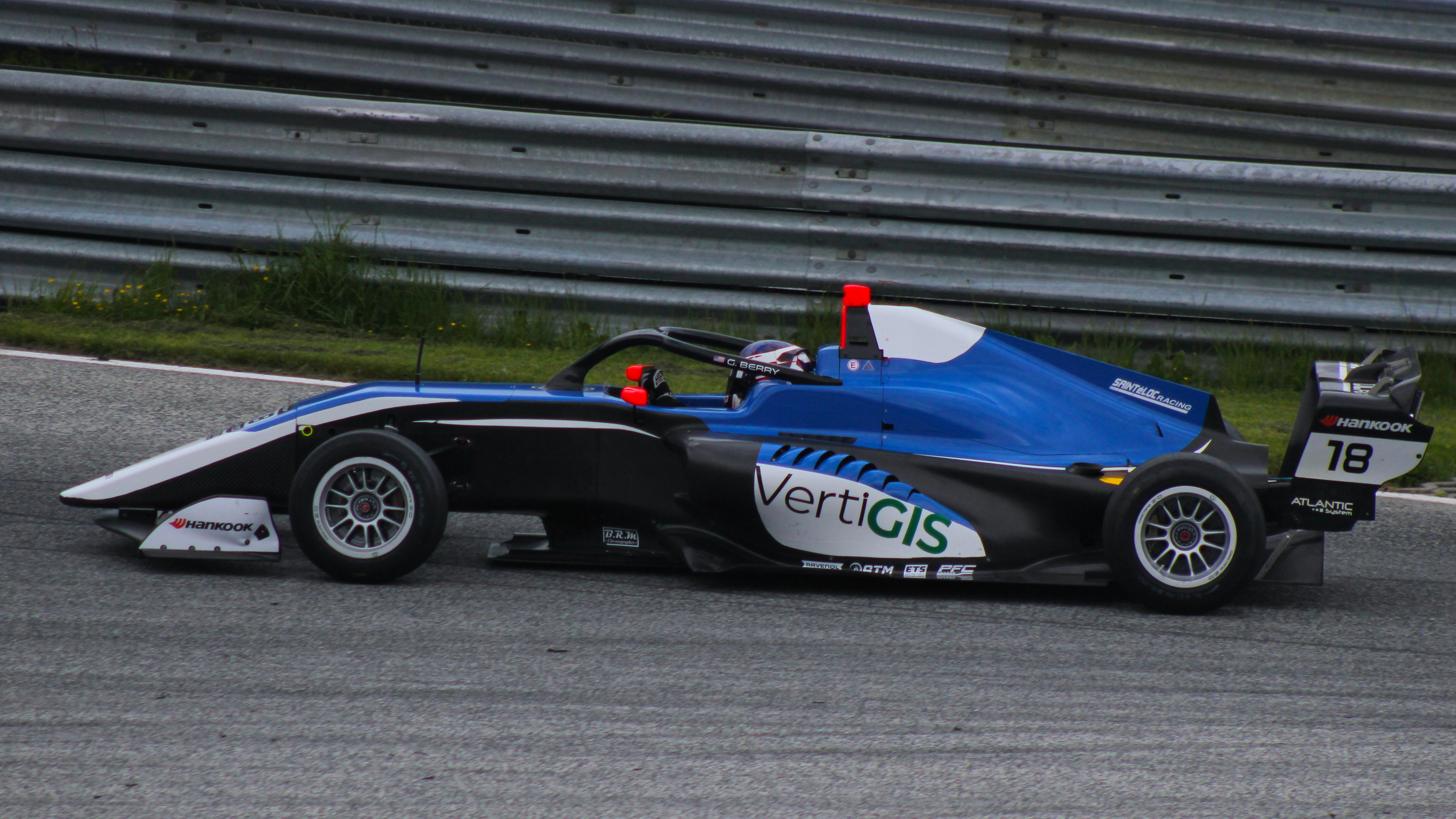
- Berry driving at the Red Bull Ring during the 2025 Eurocup-3 season
- Nationality: (United States) American
- Born: 11 December 2003 (age 22) Atlanta, Georgia, United States

Eurocup-3 career
- Debut season: 2024
- Current team: Saintéloc Racing
- Car number: 18
- Former teams: Palou Motorsport
- Starts: 34
- Wins: 1
- Podiums: 1
- Poles: 0
- Fastest laps: 0
- Best finish: 13th in 2024

Previous series
- 2025 2022–2023: Eurocup-3 Winter; French F4 Championship

Garrett Berry (born 11 December 2003) is an American racing driver who last competed in Eurocup-3 for Saintéloc Racing. He previously competed in the French F4 Championship, finishing sixth in 2023.

== Career ==
=== Karting ===
Berry did 'arrive and drive' Club 100 karting in the United Kingdom.

=== Formula 4 ===
==== 2022 ====
Berry made his Formula 4 debut as a guest driver in the final round of the 2022 French F4 Championship at Circuit Paul Ricard. He would finish his first race in 17th, the second race in 20th, and wouldn't finish the last race but as he completed 90% of the race distance, he was classified as coming in 22nd place.

==== 2023 ====
Berry would receive the support of the Winfield Racing School to compete in the series full time in 2023 French F4 Championship. He had a rough first half of the year, as he claimed his first podium and victory at the second race of the third round at Pau, the next round at Circuit de Spa-Francorchamps provided a second podium for him. The next round at Misano got him a second win in Formula 4 and at the second to last race at the final round at Circuit Paul Ricard, where he made his debut in the series last year, he got a final podium, finishing the season in sixth place with 124 points in a stellar rookie campaign.

=== Eurocup-3 ===
==== 2024 ====
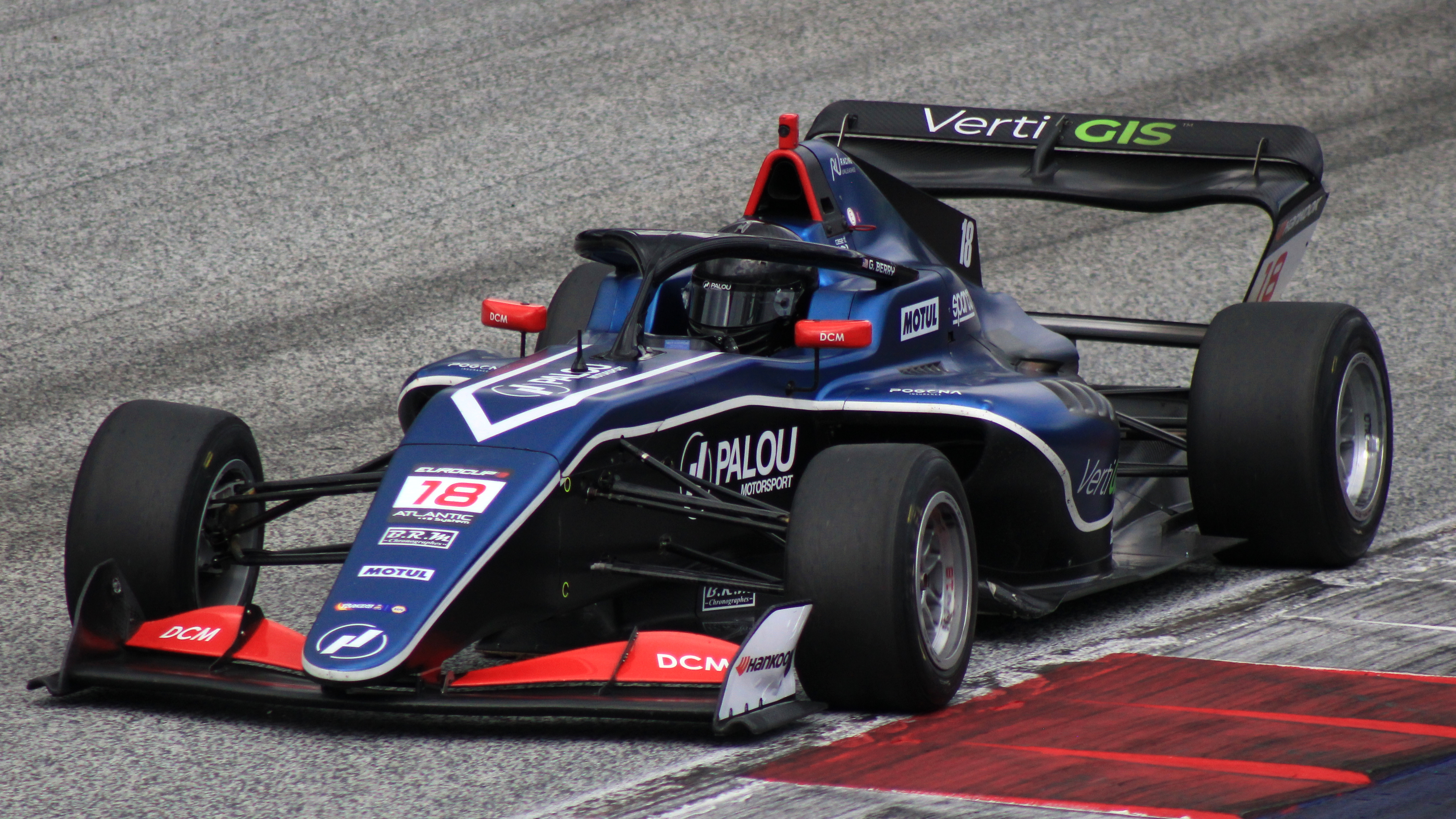
Berry driving at the Red Bull Ring during the 2024 Eurocup-3 season

Berry signed for Palou Motorsport to contest the 2024 Eurocup-3 season. He came seventh and ninth in the non-championship round at MotorLand Aragón.

Berry's only points finish came in the third race of the third round at Algarve International Circuit where he ended the race in ninth. He finished the drivers championship 21st with two points.

==== 2025 ====
Berry switched to French outfit Saintéloc Racing for his campaign in both the 2025 Eurocup-3 season and the Eurocup-3 Spanish Winter Championship, where he contested the latter only in the second round, and achieved a sole point in the third race after being disqualified in the first two races, finishing 20th overall in the championship.

In the main series, he came fourth and eighth in the first pair of races in the opening round at the Red Bull Ring. His maiden and only win in Eurocup-3 came in the sprint race of the third round at Paul Ricard. A points drought of five races followed after and ended in the sixth round at Spa-Francorchamps, after coming tenth in the first race. In the final round at Barcelona, he came sixth in the first race and ended his sophomore season thirteenth in the standings.

== Personal life ==
Berry resides in London, United Kingdom.

== Racing record ==
=== Racing career summary ===
Season	Series	Team	Races	Wins	Poles	F/Laps	Podiums	Points	Position
2022	French F4 Championship	FFSA Academy	3	0	0	0	0	0	NC†
2023	French F4 Championship	FFSA Academy	21	2	0	1	4	124	6th
2024	Eurocup-3	Palou Motorsport	16	0	0	0	0	2	21st
2025	Eurocup-3 Spanish Winter Championship	Saintéloc Racing	3	0	0	0	0	1	20th
2025	Eurocup-3	Saintéloc Racing	18	1	0	0	1	43	13th

^{*} Season still in progress.

=== Complete French F4 Championship results ===
(key) (Races in bold indicate pole position; races in italics indicate fastest lap)

Year	1	2	3	4	5	6	7	8	9	10	11	12	13	14	15	16	17	18	19	20	21	DC	Points
2022	NOG; 1	NOG; 2	NOG; 3	PAU; 1	PAU; 2	PAU; 3	MAG; 1	MAG; 2	MAG; 3	SPA; 1	SPA; 2	SPA; 3	LÉD; 1	LÉD; 2	LÉD; 3	CRT; 1	CRT; 2	CRT; 3	LEC; 1; 17	LEC; 2; 20	LEC; 3; 22†	NC†	0
2023	NOG; 1; 13	NOG; 2; 15	NOG; 3; 8	MAG; 1; 8	MAG; 2; 14	MAG; 3 Ret	PAU; 1; 6	PAU; 2; 1	PAU; 3; 5	SPA; 1; 10	SPA; 2; 3	SPA; 3; 5	MIS; 1; 6	MIS; 2; 1	MIS; 3; 6	LÉD; 1; 11	LÉD; 2 Ret	LÉD; 3; 8	LEC; 1; 7	LEC; 2; 2	LEC; 3; 6	6th	124

† As Berry was a guest driver, he was ineligible to score points.

=== Complete Eurocup-3 results ===
(key) (Races in bold indicate pole position) (Races in italics indicate fastest lap)

Year	Team	1	2	3	4	5	6	7	8	9	10	11	12	13	14	15	16	17	18	DC	Points
2024	Palou Motorsport	SPA; 1; 15	SPA; 2 C	RBR; 1; 14	RBR; 2; 13	POR; 1; 18	POR; 2; 14	POR; 3; 9	LEC; 1; 13	LEC; 2; 12	ZAN; 1; 20	ZAN; 2; 11	ARA; 1; 26†	ARA; 2 Ret	JER; 1; 20	JER; 2 Ret	CAT; 1; 17	CAT; 2; 23†		21st	2
2025	Saintéloc Racing	RBR; 1; 4	RBR; 2; 8	POR; 1 Ret	POR; SR; 7	POR; 2; 10	LEC; 1; 9	LEC; SR; 1	LEC; 2; 25	MNZ; 1 Ret	MNZ; 2; 14	ASS; 1; 11	ASS; 2; 12	SPA; 1; 10	SPA; 2; 15	JER; 1; 10	JER; 2; 26	CAT; 1; 6	CAT; 2; 13	13th	43

=== Complete Eurocup-3 Spanish Winter Championship results ===
(key) (Races in bold indicate pole position) (Races in italics indicate fastest lap)

Year	Team	1	2	3	4	5	6	7	8	DC	Points
2025	Saintéloc Racing	JER; 1	JER; 2	JER; 3	POR; 1 DSQ	POR; 2 DSQ	POR; 3; 10	ARA; 1	ARA; 2	20th	1
