= 2023 French F4 Championship =

Formula 4 motor racing series

The 2023 French F4 Championship was the 13th season to run under the guise of the French F4 Championship and the sixth under the FIA Formula 4 regulations. The series began on 7 April at Circuit Paul Armagnac and concluded on 8 October at Circuit Paul Ricard. It was the first season in which the series was partnered with the ADAC Formel Junior Team.

== Driver lineup ==
No.	Driver	Class	Rounds
2	(France) Édouard Borgna		All
3	(Italy) Leonardo Megna		All
4	(Germany) Finn Wiebelhaus		1–4, 6–7
5	(Spain) Pol López		All
6	(Japan) Hiyu Yamakoshi		All
7	(France) Paul Alberto		All
9	(France) Karel Schulz		All
10	(Romania) Andrei Duna		All
11	(Germany) Tom Kalender		All
14	(France) Adrien Closmenil		All
16	(France) Romain Andriolo		All
17	(Belgium) Yani Stevenheydens		All
18	(United States) Garrett Berry		All
22	(Andorra) Frank Porté Ruiz		All
26	(Canada) Kevin Foster		All
27	(France) Edgar Pierre		All
28	(Germany) Max Reis		All
34	(France) Arthur Dorison	G	7
37	(Romania) Luca Savu		All
44	(Ukraine) Yaroslav Veselaho		All
46	(United Kingdom) Gabriel Doyle-Parfait		All
61	(France) Louis Schlesser		All
66	(France) Enzo Richer		All
74	(France) Enzo Peugeot		All
77	(Colombia) Joao Paulo Diaz Balesteiro		All
89	(Canada) Jason Leung		All
95	(France) Evan Giltaire		All

Icon	Status
G	Guest drivers ineligible for Drivers' Championship

== Race calendar ==
French Federation of Automobile Sport published the schedule on 25 November 2022. In January 2023, the round at the Circuit de Lédenon was postponed by two weeks.

Round		Circuit	Date	Pole position	Fastest lap	Winning driver
1	R1	(France) Circuit Paul Armagnac, Nogaro	9 April	(France) Evan Giltaire	(France) Evan Giltaire	(France) Evan Giltaire
1	R2	(France) Circuit Paul Armagnac, Nogaro	9 April		(Spain) Pol López	(Spain) Pol López
1	R3	(France) Circuit Paul Armagnac, Nogaro	10 April	(France) Evan Giltaire	(Canada) Kevin Foster	(Canada) Kevin Foster
2	R1	(France) Circuit de Nevers Magny-Cours, Magny-Cours	6 May	(France) Evan Giltaire	(France) Evan Giltaire	(France) Evan Giltaire
2	R2	(France) Circuit de Nevers Magny-Cours, Magny-Cours	6 May		(Italy) Leonardo Megna	(France) Adrien Closmenil
2	R3	(France) Circuit de Nevers Magny-Cours, Magny-Cours	7 May	(France) Evan Giltaire	(France) Enzo Peugeot	(France) Romain Andriolo (Note: Giltaire finished first but received a drive through penalty converted into 30 seconds for causing a collision. Andriolo inherited the win.)
3	R1	(France) Circuit de Pau-Ville, Pau	13 May	(Canada) Kevin Foster	(France) Enzo Peugeot	(France) Enzo Peugeot
3	R2	(France) Circuit de Pau-Ville, Pau	13 May		(United States) Garrett Berry	(United States) Garrett Berry
3	R3	(France) Circuit de Pau-Ville, Pau	14 May	(Canada) Kevin Foster	(Japan) Hiyu Yamakoshi	(France) Enzo Peugeot
4	R1	(Belgium) Circuit de Spa-Francorchamps, Stavelot	3 June	(France) Evan Giltaire	(France) Evan Giltaire	(France) Evan Giltaire
4	R2	(Belgium) Circuit de Spa-Francorchamps, Stavelot	3 June		(Japan) Hiyu Yamakoshi	(France) Enzo Peugeot
4	R3	(Belgium) Circuit de Spa-Francorchamps, Stavelot	4 June	(France) Evan Giltaire	(France) Evan Giltaire	(France) Evan Giltaire
5	R1	(Italy) Misano World Circuit Marco Simoncelli, Misano Adriatico	15 July	(France) Enzo Peugeot	(France) Evan Giltaire	(France) Enzo Peugeot
5	R2	(Italy) Misano World Circuit Marco Simoncelli, Misano Adriatico	15 July		(France) Enzo Peugeot	(United States) Garrett Berry
5	R3	(Italy) Misano World Circuit Marco Simoncelli, Misano Adriatico	16 July	(France) Enzo Peugeot	(France) Enzo Peugeot	(France) Enzo Peugeot (Note: Initially, Peugeot finished first but received a one place drop penalty for overtaking Giltaire off the track and Giltaire inherited the win. The decision was overturned after an appeal.)
6	R1	(France) Circuit de Lédenon, Lédenon	23 September	(France) Enzo Peugeot	(France) Enzo Peugeot	(France) Enzo Peugeot
6	R2	(France) Circuit de Lédenon, Lédenon	23 September		(Belgium) Yani Stevenheydens	(Belgium) Yani Stevenheydens
6	R3	(France) Circuit de Lédenon, Lédenon	24 September	(France) Enzo Peugeot	(France) Evan Giltaire	(France) Enzo Peugeot
7	R1	(France) Circuit Paul Ricard, Le Castellet	7 October	(France) Evan Giltaire	(France) Evan Giltaire	(France) Evan Giltaire
7	R2	(France) Circuit Paul Ricard, Le Castellet	7 October		(France) Romain Andriolo	(Belgium) Yani Stevenheydens
7	R3	(France) Circuit Paul Ricard, Le Castellet	8 October	(France) Evan Giltaire	(France) Evan Giltaire	(France) Evan Giltaire

== Championship standings ==
Points are awarded as follows:

Races	Position										Bonus	
Races	1st	2nd	3rd	4th	5th	6th	7th	8th	9th	10th	PP	FL
Races 1 & 3	25	18	15	12	10	8	6	4	2	1	**1**	1
Race 2	15	12	10	8	6	4	2	1			–	1

=== Drivers' standings ===
Pos	Driver	NOG (France)			MAG (France)			PAU (France)			SPA (Belgium)			MIS (Italy)			LÉD (France)			LEC (France)			Pts
1	(France) Evan Giltaire	**1**	4	**2**	**1**	4	**16**	2	Ret	2	**1**	7	**1**	2	7	2	6	3	3	**1**	4	**1**	317
2	(France) Enzo Peugeot	3	2	5	3	6	5	1	2	1	6	1	3	**1**	5	**1**	**1**	7	**1**	4	Ret	2	313
3	(Canada) Kevin Foster	2	8	1	6	3	2	**17**	Ret	**20**†	2	8	4	5	2	4	2	6	2	2	3	Ret	216
4	(France) Romain Andriolo	5	6	3	2	7	1	13	Ret	11	3	2	6	3	3	3	5	10	5	6	Ret	5	188
5	(Japan) Hiyu Yamakoshi	7	7	6	5	8	3	3	Ret	4	4	5	2	17	12	Ret	Ret	2	4	Ret	Ret	3	146
6	(United States) Garrett Berry	13	15	8	8	14	Ret	6	1	5	10	3	5	6	1	6	11	Ret	8	7	2	6	124
7	(Belgium) Yani Stevenheydens	10	3	Ret	18	5	6	4	3	3	11	6	14	9	Ret	19	8	1	Ret	8	1	22	107
8	(France) Enzo Richer	4	10	4	9	10	4	16	10	Ret	13	13	13	12	6	9	4	5	6	12	5	Ret	76
9	(France) Edgar Pierre	24	22	15	10	11	Ret	12	6	6	Ret	4	8	4	4	5	22	14	Ret	3	Ret	8	74
10	(Spain) Pol López	6	1	7	4	9	8	7	Ret	WD	Ret	19	12	11	13	10	13	18	10	23	Ret	25†	54
11	(France) Paul Alberto	25	20	20	12	17	10	10	Ret	WD	15	17	11	21†	15	15	7	4	Ret	5	Ret	4	38
12	(Italy) Leonardo Megna	16	14	10	7	2	21	5	Ret	10	19	16	Ret	15	Ret	Ret	15	15	Ret	14	7	13	33
13	(France) Adrien Closmenil	15	17	11	11	1	9	8	Ret	Ret	9	10	Ret	13	9	11	Ret	Ret	7	10	Ret	11	30
14	(Germany) Max Reis	8	9	17	Ret	12	20	15	9	13	8	11	22	20†	18	Ret	3	8	Ret	13	Ret	17	24
15	(France) Louis Schlesser	11	23†	19	14	Ret	17	Ret	4	9	7	Ret	Ret	Ret	8	7	17	20	Ret	21	11	20	23
16	(Germany) Tom Kalender	12	11	Ret	19	18	13	11	7	8	5	15	7	16	Ret	12	10	11	18†	17	12	15	23
17	(Romania) Andrei Duna	Ret	19	22	21	16	Ret	20	Ret	12	Ret	12	9	7	Ret	21†	9	16	9	24	8	7	19
18	(Canada) Jason Leung	20	13	13	23	23	12	9	Ret	7	Ret	9	15	14	11	14	Ret	12	16	9	6	14	14
19	(France) Karel Schulz	17	Ret	9	20	24	15	19	15	18	12	Ret	10	8	10	8	Ret	Ret	17†	Ret	18	10	12
20	(Romania) Luca Savu	9	5	18	Ret	20	18	21	12	15	16	21	18	Ret	20	17	18	17	13	16	15	24	8
21	(Ukraine) Yaroslav Veselaho	22	16	23	16	Ret	Ret	Ret	5	Ret	14	20	19	Ret	Ret	16	20	21	14	22	17	21	6
22	(Germany) Finn Wiebelhaus	21	18	21	13	13	7	Ret	13	19	Ret	18	Ret				16	9	11	18	10	16	6
23	(Andorra) Frank Porté Ruiz	23	21	Ret	22	21	11	14	8	17	18	14	16	10	14	13	14	19	Ret	15	9	12	2
24	(United Kingdom) Gabriel Doyle-Parfait	14	12	16	15	22	14	Ret	14	14	Ret	23	17	18	19	20†	12	13	Ret	11	13	9	2
25	(Colombia) Joao Paulo Diaz Balesteiro	18	Ret	12	Ret	19	19	22†	11	16	17	22	20	19	16	18	19	23	12	19	Ret	23	0
26	(France) Édouard Borgna	19	Ret	14	17	15	Ret	18	16	Ret	Ret	Ret	21	Ret	17	DNS	21	22	15	20	14	19	0
Guest drivers ineligible to score points
–	(France) Arthur Dorison																			Ret	16	18	–
Pos	Driver	NOG (France)			MAG (France)			PAU (France)			SPA (Belgium)			MIS (Italy)			LÉD (France)			LEC (France)			Pts

Colour	Result
Gold	Winner
Silver	Second place
Bronze	Third place
Green	Points classification
Blue	Non-points classification
Blue	Non-classified finish (NC)
Purple	Retired, not classified (Ret)
Red	Did not qualify (DNQ)
Red	Did not pre-qualify (DNPQ)
Black	Disqualified (DSQ)
White	Did not start (DNS)
White	Withdrew (WD)
White	Race cancelled (C)
Blank	Did not practice (DNP)
Blank	Did not arrive (DNA)
Blank	Excluded (EX)

**Bold** – Pole
Italics – Fastest Lap
† — Did not finish but classified
