= Formula Regional Middle East Trophy =

Single-seater racing championship

Formula Regional Middle East Championship
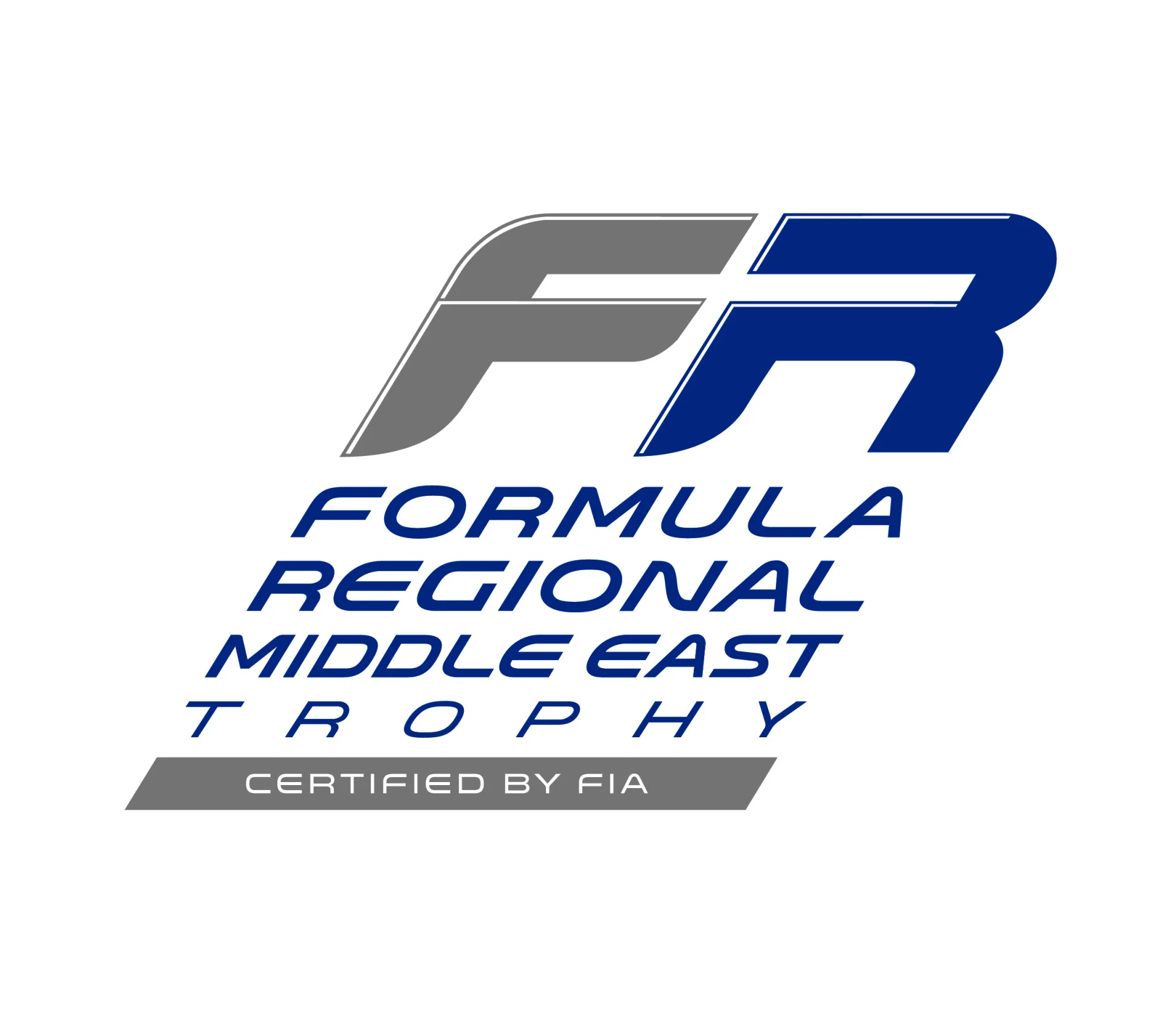
- Category: Formula Regional
- Region: Middle East
- Inaugural season: 2023
- Constructors: Tatuus
- Engine suppliers: Autotecnica
- Tyre suppliers: Giti Tire
- Drivers' champion: (France) Evan Giltaire
- Teams' champion: (France) R-ace GP
- Official website: Official website

The Formula Regional Middle East Championship is an FIA-certified Formula Regional racing series, started in 2023. The championship races in the Emirati venues of Yas Marina Circuit and Dubai Autodrome, as well as Kuwait Motor Town. The promoter of the Formula Regional Asian Championship (Top Speed) decided to relaunch Formula Regional Asian Championship in South East Asia, so the championship racing on the Middle Eastern circuits was renamed.

== Car ==
The championship features the all new Tatuus-designed and built T-326 cars, powered by a 1.6L ATM-Autotecnica Motori/Toyota 3 cylinder engine.

== Champions ==
=== Drivers ===
Season	Driver	Team	Races	Poles	Wins	Podiums	Fastest lap	Points	Margins
2023	(Italy) Andrea Kimi Antonelli	(India) Mumbai Falcons Racing Limited	15	3	5	7	5	192	40
2024	(Finland) Tuukka Taponen	(France) R-ace GP	15	5	5	9	7	255	79
2025	(France) Evan Giltaire	(France) ART Grand Prix	14	5	3	8	2	264	36
2026	(United Kingdom) Kean Nakamura-Berta	(India) Mumbai Falcons Racing Limited	11	3	2	6	3	151	12

=== Teams ===
Season	Team	Drivers	Poles	Wins	Podiums	Fastest lap	Points	Margins
2023	(India) Mumbai Falcons Racing Limited	4 (Note: Ahead of each event, the teams nominated two drivers that accumulated teams' points in 2023.)	3	5	19	6	338	91
2024	(France) R-ace GP	5	5	5	17	8	410	170
2025	(India) Mumbai Falcons Racing Limited	5	4	4	8	4	364	14
2026	(India) Mumbai Falcons Racing Limited	3	4	2	9	4	222	23

=== Rookie ===
Season	Driver	Team
2023	(Italy) Andrea Kimi Antonelli	(India) Mumbai Falcons Racing Limited
2024	(Finland) Tuukka Taponen	(France) R-ace GP
2025	(United Kingdom) Freddie Slater	(India) Mumbai Falcons Racing Limited
2026	(United Kingdom) Kean Nakamura-Berta	(India) Mumbai Falcons Racing Limited

== Circuits ==
- **Bold** denotes a circuit used in the 2026 season.

Number	Circuits	Rounds	Years
1	(United Arab Emirates) **Yas Marina Circuit**	9 (Note: Yas Marina Circuit hosted 3 rounds in 2024 and 2025, and hosted 2 rounds in 2026.)	2023–present
2	(United Arab Emirates) **Dubai Autodrome**	6 (Note: Dubai Autodrome hosted 2 rounds in 2023 and 2024.)	2023–present
3	Kuwait Motor Town	2 (Note: Kuwait Motor Town hosted 2 rounds in 2023.)	2023
3	(Qatar) **Lusail International Circuit**	2	2025–present
