= 2025 Formula Regional Middle East Championship =

Motor racing championship

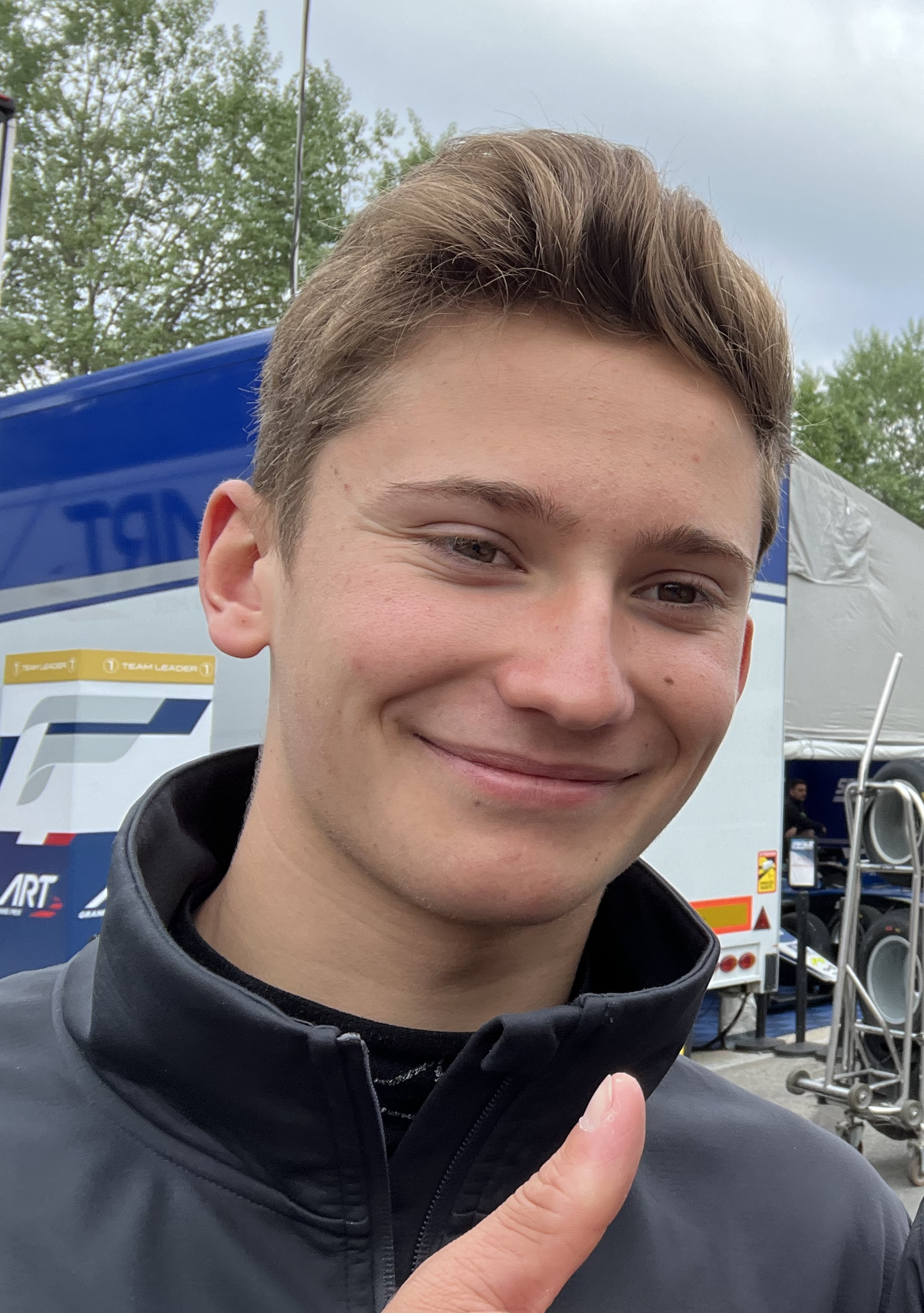
The championship was won by Evan Giltaire, driving for ART Grand Prix.

The 2025 Formula Regional Middle East Championship was a multi-event Formula Regional open-wheel single seater motor racing championship. The championship featured a mix of professional and amateur drivers, competing in Formula Regional cars. This was the third season of the championship, held in January and February 2025.

ART Grand Prix driver Evan Giltaire won the Drivers' championship title at the penultimate race. His closest challenger, runner-up Freddie Slater won the Rookie Cup at the final race, while his team, Mumbai Falcons Racing Limited, also secured its second Teams' Championship title after last winning it in 2023.

== Teams and drivers ==
All drivers competed using identical Tatuus-built Formula Regional cars powered by a 270HP turbocharged Alfa Romeo engine and running on Giti tires.

Team	No.	Driver	Status	Rounds
(France) R-ace GP	1	(France) Enzo Deligny		All
(France) R-ace GP	2	(Japan) Jin Nakamura		All
(France) R-ace GP	3	(India) Akshay Bohra	R	All
(France) R-ace GP	7	(United States) Ugo Ugochukwu		All
(France) Saintéloc Racing	4	(France) Théophile Naël		1–3
(France) Saintéloc Racing	10	(Mexico) Lorenzo Castillo	R	1–2
(France) Saintéloc Racing	10	(Italy) Nikita Bedrin (Note: Bedrin is Russian, but he competes under an Italian licence as Russian national emblems were banned by the FIA following the Russian invasion of Ukraine.)		4–5
(France) Saintéloc Racing	26	(Germany) Jakob Bergmeister	R	3
(France) Saintéloc Racing	96	(Ukraine) Yaroslav Veselaho		All
(India) Mumbai Falcons Racing Limited	4	(United Kingdom) Reza Seewooruthun	R	5
(India) Mumbai Falcons Racing Limited	8	(United Kingdom) Reza Seewooruthun	R	1–2
(India) Mumbai Falcons Racing Limited	14	(United Arab Emirates) Rashid Al Dhaheri	R	All
(India) Mumbai Falcons Racing Limited	27	(United Kingdom) Freddie Slater	R	All
(India) Mumbai Falcons Racing Limited	28	(France) Doriane Pin		3–4
(India) Mumbai Falcons Racing Limited	45	(Australia) Jack Beeton	R	All
(Australia) Evans GP	5	(Australia) Aaron Cameron		All
(Australia) Evans GP	8	(Italy) Matteo De Palo		4–5
(Australia) Evans GP	11	(Vietnam) Alex Sawer		3–5
(Australia) Evans GP	88	(United Kingdom) Kai Daryanani (Note: Daryanani is an Indian driver competing under a British licence.)	R	All
(Republic of Ireland) Pinnacle Motorsport	6	(Japan) Hiyu Yamakoshi	R	3–5
(Republic of Ireland) Pinnacle Motorsport	24	(Mexico) Ernesto Rivera	R	All
(Republic of Ireland) Pinnacle Motorsport	33	(Mexico) Jesse Carrasquedo Jr.		1–2, 5
(Republic of Ireland) Pinnacle Motorsport	56	(China) Yuanpu Cui	R	3–4
(Republic of Ireland) Pinnacle Motorsport	69	(United Kingdom) Finley Green		All
(Republic of Ireland) Pinnacle Motorsport	99	(Italy) Giovanni Maschio		1–2
(Germany) PHM Racing	9	(United States) Everett Stack	R	All
(Germany) PHM Racing	12	(Italy) Brando Badoer		All
(United Arab Emirates) AKCEL GP / PHM Racing	15	(United Kingdom) Aditya Kulkarni (Note: Kulkarni is an Indian driver competing under a British licence.)	R	1–4
(United Arab Emirates) AKCEL GP / PHM Racing	50	(India) Jaden Pariat	R	1–2
(United Arab Emirates) AKCEL GP / PHM Racing	50	(United Kingdom) James Hedley		3–4
(France) ART Grand Prix	19	(Japan) Kanato Le		All
(France) ART Grand Prix	89	(France) Taito Kato (Note: Kato is a Japanese driver competing under a French licence.)	R	All
(France) ART Grand Prix	95	(France) Evan Giltaire		All
(China) Origine Motorsport	22	(China) Wang Zhongwei		All
(China) Origine Motorsport	29	(China) Gao Yujia		5
(China) Origine Motorsport	66	(China) Ruiqi Liu		1–4

Icon	Status
R	Rookie

== Race calendar ==
The 2025 calendar was officially announced on 6 September 2024. Kuwait Motor Town was set to return to the calendar after a one-year absence. The championship was now held under the Formula Middle East banner, joint with the F4 Middle East Championship. The fifth and final round was later revealed to be held at Jeddah Corniche Circuit, which would have marked the championship's debut in Saudi Arabia. The calendar was amended later on, replacing the two opening rounds at Kuwait Motor Town with two further rounds at Yas Marina. Days before the start of the season, the calendar was changed once again, replacing the round at Jeddah Corniche Circuit with a round at Lusail International Circuit, also a debuting venue for the series.

Round		Circuit	Date	Support bill	Map of circuit locations
1	R1	(United Arab Emirates) Yas Marina Circuit, Yas Island (Grand Prix Circuit)	18 January	Middle East Trophy (6H of Abu Dhabi); Clio Cup Middle East; Gulf Radical Cup; F4 Middle East Championship	2025 Formula Regional Middle East Championship is located in Persian Gulf
1	R2	(United Arab Emirates) Yas Marina Circuit, Yas Island (Grand Prix Circuit)	19 January	Middle East Trophy (6H of Abu Dhabi); Clio Cup Middle East; Gulf Radical Cup; F4 Middle East Championship	2025 Formula Regional Middle East Championship is located in Persian Gulf
1	R3	(United Arab Emirates) Yas Marina Circuit, Yas Island (Grand Prix Circuit)	19 January	Middle East Trophy (6H of Abu Dhabi); Clio Cup Middle East; Gulf Radical Cup; F4 Middle East Championship	2025 Formula Regional Middle East Championship is located in Persian Gulf
2	R4	(United Arab Emirates) Yas Marina Circuit, Yas Island (Corkscrew Circuit)	22 January	F4 Middle East Championship	2025 Formula Regional Middle East Championship is located in Persian Gulf
2	R5	(United Arab Emirates) Yas Marina Circuit, Yas Island (Corkscrew Circuit)	23 January	F4 Middle East Championship	2025 Formula Regional Middle East Championship is located in Persian Gulf
2	R6	(United Arab Emirates) Yas Marina Circuit, Yas Island (Corkscrew Circuit)	23 January	F4 Middle East Championship	2025 Formula Regional Middle East Championship is located in Persian Gulf
3	R7	(United Arab Emirates) Dubai Autodrome, Dubai Motor City (Grand Prix Circuit)	8 February	Asian Le Mans Series (4H of Dubai); F4 Middle East Championship	2025 Formula Regional Middle East Championship is located in Persian Gulf
3	R8	(United Arab Emirates) Dubai Autodrome, Dubai Motor City (Grand Prix Circuit)	9 February	Asian Le Mans Series (4H of Dubai); F4 Middle East Championship	2025 Formula Regional Middle East Championship is located in Persian Gulf
3	R9	(United Arab Emirates) Dubai Autodrome, Dubai Motor City (Grand Prix Circuit)	9 February	Asian Le Mans Series (4H of Dubai); F4 Middle East Championship	2025 Formula Regional Middle East Championship is located in Persian Gulf
4	R10	(United Arab Emirates) Yas Marina Circuit, Yas Island (Grand Prix Circuit)	15 February	Asian Le Mans Series (4H of Abu Dhabi); F4 Middle East Championship; Clio Cup Middle East	2025 Formula Regional Middle East Championship is located in Persian Gulf
4	R11	(United Arab Emirates) Yas Marina Circuit, Yas Island (Grand Prix Circuit)	16 February	Asian Le Mans Series (4H of Abu Dhabi); F4 Middle East Championship; Clio Cup Middle East	2025 Formula Regional Middle East Championship is located in Persian Gulf
4	R12	(United Arab Emirates) Yas Marina Circuit, Yas Island (Grand Prix Circuit)	16 February	Asian Le Mans Series (4H of Abu Dhabi); F4 Middle East Championship; Clio Cup Middle East	2025 Formula Regional Middle East Championship is located in Persian Gulf
5	R13	(Qatar) Lusail International Circuit, Lusail (Grand Prix Circuit)	27 February	FIA World Endurance Championship (Qatar 1812 km); F4 Middle East Championship	2025 Formula Regional Middle East Championship is located in Persian Gulf
5	R14	(Qatar) Lusail International Circuit, Lusail (Grand Prix Circuit)	27 February	FIA World Endurance Championship (Qatar 1812 km); F4 Middle East Championship	2025 Formula Regional Middle East Championship is located in Persian Gulf
5	R15	(Qatar) Lusail International Circuit, Lusail (Grand Prix Circuit)	28 February	FIA World Endurance Championship (Qatar 1812 km); F4 Middle East Championship	2025 Formula Regional Middle East Championship is located in Persian Gulf

== Race results ==
Round		Circuit	Pole position	Fastest lap	Winning driver	Winning team	Rookie winner
1	R1	(United Arab Emirates) Yas Marina Circuit	(United Kingdom) Freddie Slater	(United Kingdom) Freddie Slater	(United Kingdom) Freddie Slater	(India) Mumbai Falcons Racing Limited	(United Kingdom) Freddie Slater
1	R2	(United Arab Emirates) Yas Marina Circuit		(Japan) Kanato Le	(Japan) Kanato Le	(France) ART Grand Prix	(United Kingdom) Freddie Slater
1	R3	(United Arab Emirates) Yas Marina Circuit	(United Kingdom) Freddie Slater	(United Kingdom) Freddie Slater	(United Kingdom) Freddie Slater	(India) Mumbai Falcons Racing Limited	(United Kingdom) Freddie Slater
2	R4	(United Arab Emirates) Yas Marina Circuit	(United Kingdom) Freddie Slater	(United Kingdom) Freddie Slater	(France) Evan Giltaire	(France) ART Grand Prix	(United Arab Emirates) Rashid Al Dhaheri
2	R5	(United Arab Emirates) Yas Marina Circuit		(France) Théophile Naël	(Italy) Brando Badoer	(Germany) PHM Racing	(Australia) Jack Beeton
2	R6	(United Arab Emirates) Yas Marina Circuit	(France) Evan Giltaire	(France) Evan Giltaire	(France) Evan Giltaire	(France) ART Grand Prix	(Mexico) Ernesto Rivera
3	R7	(United Arab Emirates) Dubai Autodrome	(France) Evan Giltaire	(United States) Ugo Ugochukwu	(United States) Ugo Ugochukwu	(France) R-ace GP	(United Arab Emirates) Rashid Al Dhaheri
3	R8	(United Arab Emirates) Dubai Autodrome		(France) Enzo Deligny	(Japan) Jin Nakamura	(France) R-ace GP	(United Kingdom) Freddie Slater
3	R9	(United Arab Emirates) Dubai Autodrome	(France) Evan Giltaire	(France) Evan Giltaire	(France) Evan Giltaire	(France) ART Grand Prix	(United Arab Emirates) Rashid Al Dhaheri
4	R10	(United Arab Emirates) Yas Marina Circuit	(France) Evan Giltaire	(United States) Ugo Ugochukwu	(United Kingdom) Freddie Slater	(India) Mumbai Falcons Racing Limited	(United Kingdom) Freddie Slater
4	R11	(United Arab Emirates) Yas Marina Circuit		(India) Akshay Bohra	(India) Akshay Bohra	(France) R-ace GP	(India) Akshay Bohra
4	R12	(United Arab Emirates) Yas Marina Circuit	(United Kingdom) Freddie Slater	(United Kingdom) Freddie Slater	(United Kingdom) Freddie Slater	(India) Mumbai Falcons Racing Limited	(United Kingdom) Freddie Slater
5	R13	(Qatar) Lusail International Circuit	(France) Evan Giltaire	(Italy) Nikita Bedrin	(Italy) Nikita Bedrin	(France) Saintéloc Racing	(France) Taito Kato
5	R14	(Qatar) Lusail International Circuit		(France) Enzo Deligny	(France) Enzo Deligny	(France) R-ace GP	(Mexico) Ernesto Rivera
5	R15	(Qatar) Lusail International Circuit	(United States) Ugo Ugochukwu	(Italy) Nikita Bedrin	(Australia) Jack Beeton	(India) Mumbai Falcons Racing Limited	(Australia) Jack Beeton

== Season report ==
=== First half ===
The 2025 Formula Regional Middle East Championship commenced around Yas Marina Circuit's Grand Prix layout with Mumbai Falcons’ Freddie Slater taking pole position in both qualifying sessions. In the first race, Slater capitalized on his teammate Rashid Al Dhaheri overtaking ART Grand Prix’s Evan Giltaire for second place, allowing him to establish an early lead. The top three positions remained unchanged after Al Dhaheri’s opening move in an otherwise largely uneventful season opener. The reversed-grid second race saw ART’s Kanato Le start from pole position and successfully defend against Saintéloc Racing’s Théophile Naël and R-ace GP’s Enzo Deligny throughout the race, securing his maiden Formula Regional victory. In the third race, Slater delivered another commanding performance, leading Giltaire from start to finish and concluding the opening round with a 26-point lead over the French driver. Jesse Carrasquedo Jr. overcame an early challenge from his Pinnacle Motorsport teammate Ernesto Rivera to secure third place.

Just three days later, the second round took place on Yas Marina’s corkscrew layout, with Slater and Giltaire securing the pole positions. Slater led the opening stages of the first race but made an error with ten minutes remaining, allowing Giltaire to pass. Slater continued to drop down the order and finished fifth, while Al Dhaheri and ART’s Taito Kato completed the podium. The second race saw early trouble for Giltaire, who failed to start due to a gearbox issue. PHM Racing’s Brando Badoer started from pole position and controlled the race to secure a lights-to-flag victory ahead of Naël and Mumbai Falcons driver Jack Beeton. Giltaire returned to the front in the third race, where the title battle took another turn as Slater was spun around by Kato. He fell to the back and later retired after another collision. At the front, R-ace GP’s Ugo Ugochukwu briefly led before hitting the wall a few laps later, allowing Giltaire to claim victory ahead of Badoer and Deligny. With the result, Giltaire moved into a twelve-point lead over Slater in the standings.

For the third round, the field traveled to Dubai Autodrome, where Giltaire swept qualifying and took both pole positions. However, a dusty track led to a slow start in the first race, allowing Ugochukwu and Badoer to pass him into the first corner. Badoer spent much of the race defending against Giltaire, which enabled Ugochukwu to pull away before the race was cut short due to a crash. In the second race, R-ace GP’s Jin Nakamura started from reversed-grid pole position and maintained his lead. Slater, starting fourth, moved up to second and applied pressure on Nakamura. Multiple attempts to pass him did not pan out, however, and Slater had to fend off attacks from behind himself. Nakamura held on to win, with Slater finishing second and Al Dhaheri securing third. Giltaire finished fourth in race two but converted his pole position in race three into a largely uncontested victory, extending his championship lead over Slater to 36 points. Ugochukwu attacked Giltaire once but was unable to get through. He finished second, ahead of Naël.

=== Second half ===
Championship contenders Giltaire and Slater each claimed a pole position as the series returned to Yas Marina. Giltaire started the first race from the front, but Slater made a stronger start and took the lead before the first corner. He successfully managed two safety car restarts, while Ugochukwu executed a decisive move to demote Giltaire to third. Although Ugochukwu closed the gap to Slater, he was unable to challenge for the lead, allowing Slater to secure his third victory of the season. In the second race, R-ace GP’s Akshay Bohra started from pole position and spent the race defending against Saintéloc Racing’s Nikita Bedrin. Despite staying within a few car lengths, Bedrin was unable to overtake and finished just 0.1 seconds behind Bohra, while Badoer completed the podium. The third race featured another direct battle between title rivals Slater and Giltaire, with Slater emerging victorious ahead of Giltaire and Ugochukwu. That allowed him to reduce his deficit to 17 points behind Giltaire heading into the final round.

The final round of the championship marked its debut at Lusail International Circuit, with Giltaire and Ugochukwu securing pole positions in qualifying. Rain ahead of the first race led to an early lead change as Giltaire dropped to third. A collision with Slater pushed both down the order, but Giltaire recovered back to third before struggling with tire wear. Bedrin capitalized on this to claim victory ahead of Ugochukwu, while a post-race penalty relegated Giltaire to sixth, promoting Nakamura to third. In race two, Pinnacle Motorsport’s Hiyu Yamakoshi led from reversed-grid pole until Al Dhaheri overtook him. However, tire degradation once again reshuffled the standings, with Deligny, Rivera, and Bedrin able to take the top three spots. Giltaire’s fourth-place finish secured him the title. Race three saw Beeton charge from fifth to first by lap five, holding off pole sitter Ugochukwu and Bedrin, who finished second and third, respectively. Slater finished fourth and claimed the Rookie Championship title, while his team won the teams’ title.

== Championship standings ==
=== Scoring system ===
The championship's scoring system was overhauled in 2025. Points were awarded to the top twelve classified drivers, while two further points were awarded for taking a pole position in qualifying.

Position	**1st**	**2nd**	**3rd**	**4th**	**5th**	**6th**	**7th**	**8th**	**9th**	**10th**	**11th**	**12th**	Pole
Points	30	22	18	15	12	10	8	6	4	3	2	1	2

=== Drivers' championship ===
Pos	Driver	YMC1 (United Arab Emirates)			YMC2 (United Arab Emirates)			DUB (United Arab Emirates)			YMC3 (United Arab Emirates)			LUS (Qatar)			Pts
Pos	Driver	R1	R2	R3	R1	R2	R3	R1	R2	R3	R1	R2	R3	R1	R2	R3	Pts
1	(France) Evan Giltaire	3	7	2	1	DNS	**1**	**3**	4	**1**	**3**	7	2	**6**	4	6	264
2	(United Kingdom) Freddie Slater	**1**	6	**1**	**5**	6	Ret	7	2	6	1	6	**1**	12	11	4	228
3	(United States) Ugo Ugochukwu	10	4	Ret	7	4	19†	1	5	2	2	8	3	2	7	**2**	205
4	(Italy) Brando Badoer	4	5	6	10	1	2	2	9	7	6	3	14	14	13	11	156
5	(France) Enzo Deligny	7	3	10	12	11	3	8	8	4	7	11	4	4	1	16	147
6	(United Arab Emirates) Rashid Al Dhaheri	2	8	16	2	5	9	5	3	5	5	14	23†	8	5	8	144
7	(France) Théophile Naël	8	2	4	9	2	4	4	7	3							125
8	(Japan) Kanato Le	9	1	13	14	9	7	6	10	Ret	4	4	15	5	8	5	119
9	(Mexico) Ernesto Rivera	5	13	5	17	12	5	25†	22	9	8	5	7	9	2	7	101
10	(Japan) Jin Nakamura	12	9	8	6	8	8	10	1	12	14	10	10	3	21	10	94
11	(Italy) Nikita Bedrin										9	2	Ret	1	3	3	92
12	(France) Taito Kato	6	14	7	3	22	18	9	12	10	11	12	6	7	6	13	75
13	(Australia) Jack Beeton	17	Ret	14	8	3	14	12	11	22	13	Ret	8	11	Ret	1	65
14	(India) Akshay Bohra	15	Ret	Ret	16	14	10	11	6	18	10	1	22	13	14	17	48
15	(Mexico) Jesse Carrasquedo Jr.	11	10	3	4	10	17							21	16	14	41
16	(Japan) Hiyu Yamakoshi							26†	19	8	17	9	5	10	22†	9	29
17	(United Kingdom) Reza Seewooruthun	Ret	12	9	11	7	6							15	10	15	28
18	(Australia) Aaron Cameron	13	11	12	18	DNS	Ret	24	20	Ret	12	19	9	WD	WD	WD	8
19	(Italy) Matteo De Palo										Ret	16	24†	Ret	9	19	4
20	(China) Ruiqi Liu	14	22†	19	13	17	11	13	13	11	19	13	20				4
21	(United Kingdom) Aditya Kulkarni	21	17	11	24	23†	15	17	15	15	18	Ret	11				4
22	(United Kingdom) Kai Daryanani	25†	18	18	15	13	13	21	14	14	Ret	17	12	16	15	12	2
23	(Italy) Giovanni Maschio	19	Ret	15	21	15	12										1
24	(Vietnam) Alex Sawer							20	26	20	21	18	Ret	18	12	21	1
25	(United Kingdom) James Hedley							18	16	13	15	Ret	13				0
26	(Ukraine) Yaroslav Veselaho	20	19	17	23	16	Ret	14	17	16	20	21	17	19	17	23	0
27	(United States) Everett Stack	18	15	Ret	Ret	19	16	Ret	25	19	16	15	Ret	Ret	Ret	20	0
28	(China) Yuanpu Cui							15	21	17	24†	21	21				0
29	(France) Doriane Pin							16	18	Ret	23	20	16				0
30	(India) Jaden Pariat	23	16	22	19	20	Ret										0
31	(Mexico) Lorenzo Castillo	16	20	21	20	Ret	Ret										0
32	(China) Gao Yujia													17	18	18	0
33	(United Kingdom) Finley Green	24	Ret	20	22	18	Ret	19	24	Ret	Ret	23	19	20	20	Ret	0
34	(China) Wang Zhongwei	22	21	23	25	21	Ret	22	27	21	22	Ret	18	22†	19	22	0
35	(Germany) Jakob Bergmeister							23	23	Ret							0
Pos	Driver	R1	R2	R3	R1	R2	R3	R1	R2	R3	R1	R2	R3	R1	R2	R3	Pts
Pos	Driver	YMC1 (United Arab Emirates)			YMC2 (United Arab Emirates)			DUB (United Arab Emirates)			YMC3 (United Arab Emirates)			LUS (Qatar)			Pts

Colour	Result
Gold	Winner
Silver	Second place
Bronze	Third place
Green	Points classification
Blue	Non-points classification
Blue	Non-classified finish (NC)
Purple	Retired, not classified (Ret)
Red	Did not qualify (DNQ)
Red	Did not pre-qualify (DNPQ)
Black	Disqualified (DSQ)
White	Did not start (DNS)
White	Withdrew (WD)
White	Race cancelled (C)
Blank	Did not practice (DNP)
Blank	Did not arrive (DNA)
Blank	Excluded (EX)

**Bold** – Pole

Italics – Fastest Lap

† – Driver did not finish the race, but was classified as they completed more than 75% of the race distance.

=== Rookie Cup ===
Pos	Driver	YMC1 (United Arab Emirates)			YMC2 (United Arab Emirates)			DUB (United Arab Emirates)			YMC3 (United Arab Emirates)			LUS (Qatar)			Pts
Pos	Driver	R1	R2	R3	R1	R2	R3	R1	R2	R3	R1	R2	R3	R1	R2	R3	Pts
1	(United Kingdom) Freddie Slater	**1**	1	**1**	**3**	3	Ret	2	1	2	**1**	3	**1**	6	5	**2**	334
2	(United Arab Emirates) Rashid Al Dhaheri	2	2	7	1	2	**3**	**1**	2	**1**	2	6	10†	**2**	2	4	306
3	(Mexico) Ernesto Rivera	3	4	2	8	5	1	10†	10	4	3	2	4	3	1	3	245
4	(France) Taito Kato	4	5	3	2	10	9	3	5	5	5	5	3	1	3	7	214
5	(Australia) Jack Beeton	7	Ret	6	4	1	6	5	4	11	6	Ret	5	5	Ret	1	166
6	(India) Akshay Bohra	5	Ret	Ret	7	7	4	4	3	9	4	1	9	7	6	9	151
7	(United Kingdom) Reza Seewooruthun	Ret	3	4	5	4	2							8	4	8	109
8	(United Kingdom) Kai Daryanani	11†	9	8	6	6	5	8	6	6	Ret	8	7	9	7	6	106
9	(Japan) Hiyu Yamakoshi							11†	8	3	8	4	2	4	8†	5	102
10	(United Kingdom) Aditya Kulkarni	9	8	5	11	11†	7	7	7	7	9	Ret	6				72
11	(United States) Everett Stack	8	6	Ret	Ret	8	8	Ret	12	10	7	7	Ret	Ret	Ret	10	51
12	(China) Yuanpu Cui							6	9	8	10†	9	8				33
13	(India) Jaden Pariat	10	7	10	9	9	Ret										22
14	(Mexico) Lorenzo Castillo	6	10	9	10	Ret	Ret										20
15	(Germany) Jakob Bergmeister							9	11	Ret							6
Pos	Driver	R1	R2	R3	R1	R2	R3	R1	R2	R3	R1	R2	R3	R1	R2	R3	Pts
Pos	Driver	YMC1 (United Arab Emirates)			YMC2 (United Arab Emirates)			DUB (United Arab Emirates)			YMC3 (United Arab Emirates)			LUS (Qatar)			Pts

=== Teams' Championship ===
Ahead of each event, teams nominated two drivers who accumulated teams' points.

Pos	Team	No.	YMC1 (United Arab Emirates)			YMC2 (United Arab Emirates)			DUB (United Arab Emirates)			YMC3 (United Arab Emirates)			LUS (Qatar)			Pts
Pos	Team	No.	R1	R2	R3	R1	R2	R3	R1	R2	R3	R1	R2	R3	R1	R2	R3	Pts
1	(India) Mumbai Falcons Racing Limited	14	2	8	16	2	5	9	5	3	5	5	14	23†	8	5	8	364
1	(India) Mumbai Falcons Racing Limited	27	**1**	6	**1**	**5**	6	Ret	7	2	6	1	6	**1**	12	11	4	364
2	(France) R-ace GP	1	7	3	10	12	11	3	8	8	4	7	11	4	4	1	16	350
2	(France) R-ace GP	7	10	4	Ret	7	4	19†	1	5	2	2	8	3	2	7	**2**	350
3	(France) ART Grand Prix	19										4	4	15				346
3	(France) ART Grand Prix	89	6	14	7	3	22	18	9	12	10				7	6	13	346
3	(France) ART Grand Prix	95	3	7	2	1	DNS	**1**	**3**	4	**1**	**3**	7	2	**6**	4	6	346
4	(France) Saintéloc Racing	4	8	2	4	9	2	4	4	7	3							217
4	(France) Saintéloc Racing	10				20	Ret	Ret				9	2	Ret	1	3	3	217
4	(France) Saintéloc Racing	26							23	23	Ret							217
4	(France) Saintéloc Racing	96	20	19	17							20	21	17	19	17	23	217
5	(Germany) PHM Racing	9	18	15	Ret	Ret	19	16	Ret	25	19	16	15	Ret	Ret	Ret	20	156
5	(Germany) PHM Racing	12	4	5	6	10	1	2	2	9	7	6	3	14	14	13	11	156
6	(Republic of Ireland) Pinnacle Motorsport	6							26†	19	8	17	9	5	10	22†	9	137
6	(Republic of Ireland) Pinnacle Motorsport	24	5	13	5	17	12	5	25†	22	9	8	5	7				137
6	(Republic of Ireland) Pinnacle Motorsport	33	11	10	3	4	10	17							21	16	14	137
7	(Australia) Evans GP	5	13	11	12	18	DNS	Ret	24	20	Ret	12	19	9				13
7	(Australia) Evans GP	8										Ret	16	24†	Ret	9	19	13
7	(Australia) Evans GP	88	25†	18	18	15	13	13	21	14	14				16	15	12	13
8	(China) Origine Motorsport	22	22	21	23	25	21	Ret	22	27	21	22	Ret	18	22†	19	22	4
8	(China) Origine Motorsport	29													17	18	18	4
8	(China) Origine Motorsport	66	14	22†	19	13	17	11	13	13	11	19	13	20				4
9	(United Arab Emirates) AKCEL GP / PHM Racing	15	21	17	11	24	23†	15	17	15	15	18	Ret	11				4
9	(United Arab Emirates) AKCEL GP / PHM Racing	50	23	16	22	19	20	Ret	18	16	13	15	Ret	13				4
Pos	Team	No.	R1	R2	R3	R1	R2	R3	R1	R2	R3	R1	R2	R3	R1	R2	R3	Pts
Pos	Team	No.	YMC1 (United Arab Emirates)			YMC2 (United Arab Emirates)			DUB1 (United Arab Emirates)			YMC3 (United Arab Emirates)			LUS (Qatar)			Pts
