= Winfield Racing School =

French racing school

École de Pilotage Winfield
- Former name: École de Pilotage Jim Russell
- Established: 1963
- Founders: Bill Knight, Jim Russell
- Parent institution: Winfield Group S.A.
- Location: Le Castellet, Var, France; 43°15′07″N 5°47′54″E
- Website: winfieldracingschool.com

The Winfield Racing School (formal name: École de Pilotage Winfield (Note: The "Winfield" name has nothing to do with cigarette brand Winfield. It is the maiden name of Bill Knight's mother.)) is a French school for racing drivers at Paul Ricard in France.

== History ==
Winfield Racing School was established as École de Pilotage Jim Russell by Bill Knight, Arthur Owen and Jim Russell with help from Gérard Crombac at Magny-Cours, France in 1963. The name was changed to École de Pilotage Winfield (Winfield Driver School) in 1964 when Bill Knight, a successful land speed record campaigner from the Jersey, who owned a karting circuit in Mallorca among other ventures named Winfield, decided to make the new project independent from Russell.

At the time, the then-Jean Behra circuit had just been built in 1960 by farmer and motorsport promoter Jean Bernigaud, whom Gérard 'Jabby' Crombac (Note: not a French, but a Swiss) knew about, and the school became the main user of the otherwise under-utilized local racing course. There were many aspiring young drivers in France, where an open-wheel racing school did not exist, (Note: Sports car racing schools did.) and the school enjoyed initial success attracting many talented students including Jean-Pierre Jaussaud, François Cevert, Patrick Depailler, Jacques Laffite and Patrick Tambay.

Bill Knight's son Mike, aged 19, finished 2nd after Peter Warr (Lotus 23, 1650cc Cosworth one-off pre-crossflow push-rod) in the inaugural FIA-sanctioned Japan Grand Prix at Suzuka Circuit in May 1963 driving a Lotus 23 with a 1098cc Cosworth Mk.IV. He won the 2nd Japan Grand Prix (Note: [Picture on rewind-media.com) the next year in 1964 (Note: These excursions in 1963 and 1964 by British drivers, including Arthur Owen, were arranged by Bill and Jabby Crombac, who was asked by the manager of Honda F1 Team, Yoshio Nakamura (Honda is the owner/builder of Suzuka Circuit), to send a contingent of contemporary racers.) driving a Brabham BT9, (Note: Mike Knight's Brabham BT9 is shown in the center on [this picture on rewind-media.com, among another Brabham BT9 and a Lotus 18, just before being shipped to Japan.) against Peter Warr (Lotus 27), Arthur Owen (Cooper T67), F. Francis (Lotus 22), M. Evans (Lola Mk.3) and others. He acted as the instructor at the school together with Renato 'Tico' Martini, who initially was the Chief Mechanic of the school (Arthur Owen was the Chief Instructor initially. Tico also started his own racing car constructor, Automobiles Martini in 1965, (Note: Martini racing cars were initially offered through this racing school, with the type prefix "MK" (Martini-Knight) and "MW" (Martini-Winfield).) and went on to campaign an F1 Martini with René Arnoux as the driver in 1978).

Mike Knight and his brother Richard took over the ownership of the school in 1966 when Bill Knight went back to the UK. Mike managed the school with Tico Martini until 1973 when Mike moved back to the UK and Richard came over to run the business for the next 10 years until 1983 when Mike returned after running the DYMAG racing wheels venture.

Shell Oil became the sponsor of the school from 1963 until 1973 when François Cevert died of injuries in a practice accident at Watkins Glen in October. René Arnoux was the last of the Volant Shell Competition Scholarship drivers coming out of the school, who were given a gratis season of Formula France. Shell terminated the sponsorship in the middle of the first oil crisis in 1973, but the French oil giant, Elf filled the spot and added the second school venue at Paul Ricard (previously called the Circuit du Castellet) at Le Castellet near Marseille by entrusting the management of École de pilotage Renault-Elf Circuit Paul Ricard (Renault-Elf Paul Ricard Circuit Driving School) and changing its name to Winfield Racing School (École de pilotage Renault-Elf-Winfield).

Over the course of 35 years, 30 of the school graduates became a Formula One driver, including Damon Hill. (At least 24 according to the Notable Students section below.)

== Volant Elf scholarship (Volant Elf-Winfield) ==
From 1974, Elf took over the scholarship and it became Volant Elf Scholarship offered at the school in addition to the Formula Renault and Formula 3 team the school operated to offer "Prize Drive" spots for the qualified students as a strong incentive. At the end of each season, shoot-out sessions are organized by the racing school to determine the five best students. The final winner is granted the full financing of a season in French Formula Renault Championship for the following year. One of the qualified students, Alain Prost, won 12 of the 13 races in the 1976 Formula Renault season.

With the realization that there are some exceptional talents among the non-winners, Trophée Winfield was also created to offer second chances for recognition, as well as for the winners of shorter-term programs at the school.

== Rebirth ==
In March 2015, Frédéric Garcia and Anne-Charlotte Rémy invested and bought the Winfield Racing School brand. Adding Historic Racing, brought in by Laurent Fort (Winfield Héritage) to the line of activities, the school offers a Formula 1 driving experience day to wealthy enthusiasts in addition to the traditional schooling for young racing drivers, occupying the modern facilities at Paul Ricard circuit previously used by Renault F1 and Toyota F1 teams.

The school also relaunched in 2018 the "Volant Winfield" and the "Trophée Winfield", single-seater training and selection programmes. The 2018 Volant Winfield winner, Brazilian Caio Collet, was crowned Formula 4 French champion the same year and has been a member of the Renault Sport Academy since 2019. Théo Pourchaire, winner of the 2018 Trophée Winfield, won the German Formula 4 championship in 2019 and made his debut in Formula Three the following year. The 2019 Volant Winfield was won by Jules Mettetal, while the 2019 Trophée Winfield (reserved for drivers under 16) was claimed by Isack Hadjar, then aged 14. At the same event, Doriane Pin (aged 15) was recognised as the best female driver and received a prize from the FIA Women in Motorsport Commission, earning a preparation day and two Formula 4 test days with the FFSA Academy. Hadjar subsequently reached Formula One in 2025 with Racing Bulls, before moving to Red Bull Racing for 2026, becoming the first Algerian driver in Formula 1. Pin won the F1 Academy championship in 2025 and has been a Mercedes Formula 1 development driver since 2026. In 2023, Adrien Closmenil, supported by the Winfield Racing School, made his debut in the French Formula 4 Championship. He subsequently moved to endurance racing in the LMP3 category and won the European Le Mans Series championship in 2025.

== Notable students ==
- In parentheses in the following list, YEAR is the year attended.
- Volant Shell(up to 1973) or Volant Elf(from 1974) are the top graduate for the year by winning the Volant qualifier race.
- Volant (from 2015) are the top graduate for the year selected by a jury. (Note: Qualification became subjective for other capabilities, like presentation/communication skills, in addition to being fast in races.)
- 'finalist' are the winners of shoot-out sessions who proceeded to the final Volant qualifier.
- Trophée Winfield is awarded to an exceptional driver in the loser pool, or for winners in short-term programs.

- Jean-Pierre Jaussaud (1963 Volant Shell)
- Johnny Servoz-Gavin (1963)
- Roby Weber (1964 Volant Shell)
- Claude Vigreux (1965 Volant Shell)
- Jean-Pierre Jarier (1965)
- François Cevert (1966 Volant Shell)
- Patrick Depailler (1966)
- François Mazet (1967 Volant Shell)
- Jean-Luc Salomon (1968 Volant Shell) (Note: He had secured a Formula 1 seat of Lotus 72 with Team Lotus before his death in 1970.)
- Jacques Laffite (1968 Trophée Winfield)
- José Dolhem (1969 Volant Shell)
- Graham Stoker
- Guy Dhotel (1970 Volant Shell)
- Patrick Tambay (1971 Volant Shell)
- Gérard Camili (1971 Volant Shell finalist)
- Didier Pironi (1972 Volant Shell)
- René Arnoux (1973 Volant Shell)
- Bruno Saby (1973 Volant Shell finalist)
- Serge Meynard (1974 Volant Elf)
- Patrick Gaillard (1974 Volant Elf finalist)
- Alain Prost (1975 Volant Elf)
- Jean-Louis Schlesser
- Gérard Choukroun (1976 Volant Elf)
- Alain Ferté (1977 Volant Elf)
- Pascal Fabre (1978 Volant Elf)
- François Chauche (1978 Volant Elf finalist)
- Philippe Renault (1979 Volant Elf)
- Christian Danner
- Philippe Paoli (1980 Volant Elf)
- Olivier Grouillard (1981 Volant Elf)
- Paul Belmondo (1982 Volant Elf)
- Éric Bernard (1983 Volant Elf)
- Jean Alesi (1983 Volant Elf finalist)
- Jeffrey E Schwartz (1983 Volant Elf finalist)
- Jeremy Dale (1983)
- Damon Hill (1983)
- Bertrand Gachot (1983)
- Érik Comas (1984 Volant Elf)
- Alain Menu (1984 Volant Elf finalist)
- Ron Emmick (1985 Volant Elf)
- Ludovic Faure (1986 Volant Elf)
- Olivier Panis (1987 Volant Elf)
- Yvan Muller (1987 Volant Elf finalist)
- Guillaume Gomez (1988 Volant Elf)
- Stéphane Ortelli (1989 Volant Elf)
- Richie Hearn (1990 Volant Elf)
- Mark Hotchkis (1990)
- Jason Engle (1991 Volant Elf)
- Steeve Hiesse (1992 Volant Elf)
- Narain Karthikeyan (1992 Volant Elf finalist)
- Michel Disdier (1992)
- Sébastien Boulet (1993 Volant Elf) (Note: 1993 had two recipients.)
- Sébastien Alberto (1993 Volant Elf)
- Marcel Fässler (1993 Volant Elf finalist)
- Renaud Malinconi (1994)
- Jeff Shafer (1995)
- Masaki Kano (1995)
- Harold Primat
- Julien Beltoise (Volant finalist)
- Caio Collet (2018 Volant)
- Théo Pourchaire (2018 Trophée Winfield) — ADAC Formula 4 champion (2019); FIA Formula 2 Championship champion (2023); Formula One free practice driver with Alfa Romeo F1 Team Stake (2023).
- Jules Mettetal (2019 Volant)
- Shane Chandaria
- Isack Hadjar (2019 Trophée Winfield) — Runner-up in the FIA Formula 2 Championship (2024); Formula One driver with Racing Bulls (2025) and Red Bull Racing (2026); first Algerian driver in Formula 1.
- Doriane Pin (best female driver, 2019 Volant Winfield — FIA Women in Motorsport Commission prize) — Ferrari Challenge Europe champion (2022); F1 Academy champion (2025); Mercedes Formula 1 development driver (from 2026).
- Adrien Closmenil (Winfield Racing School-supported driver, French F4, 2023) — European Le Mans Series LMP3 champion (2025).
