= Ruiqi Liu =

Chinese racing driver (born 2006)

- 刘瑞祺
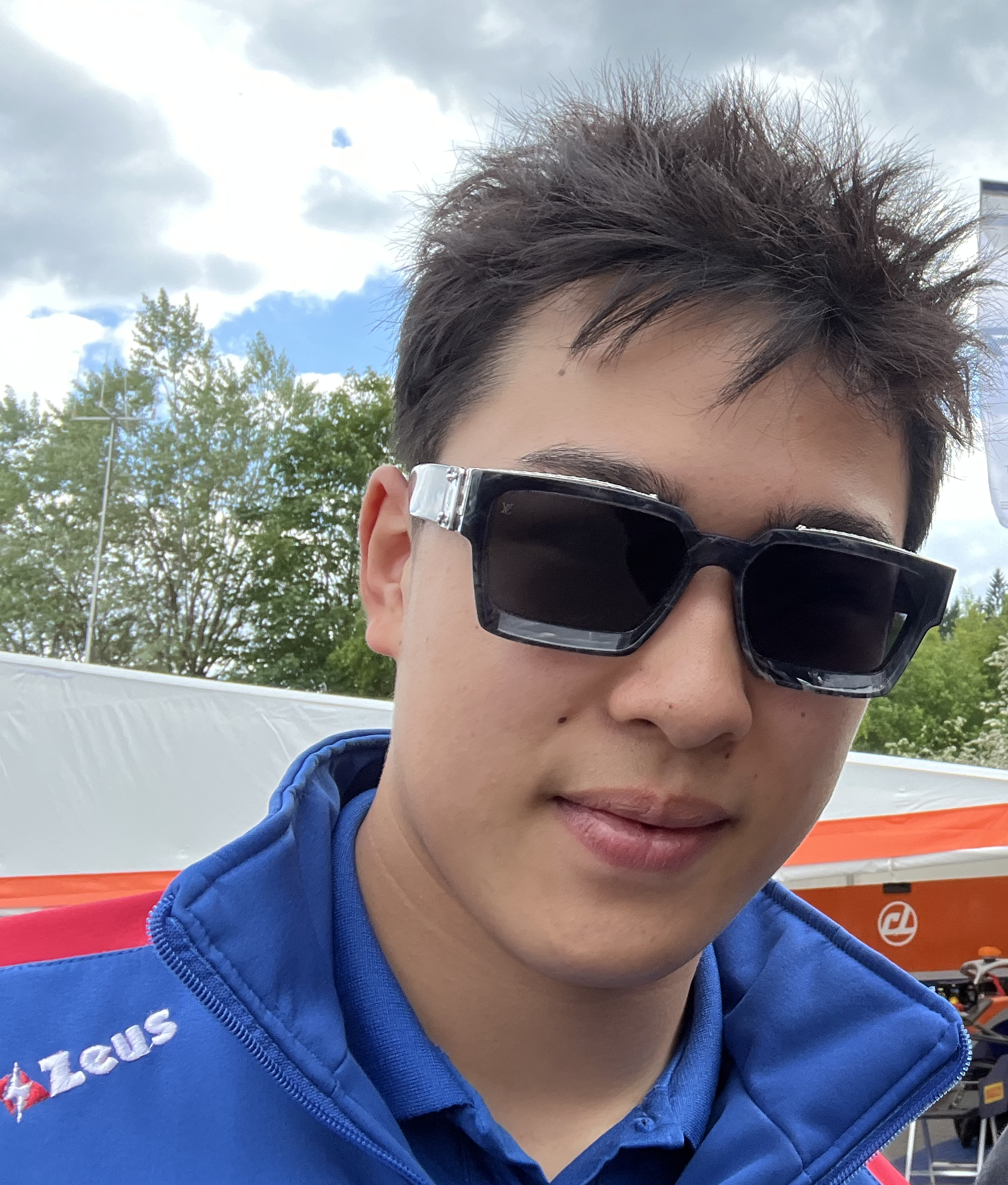
- Liu in 2025
- Born: 4 September 2006 (age 20); Shanghai, China
- Nationality: (China) Chinese

Formula Regional European Championship career
- Debut season: 2024
- Current team: Trident
- Car number: 66
- Starts: 40
- Wins: 0
- Podiums: 0
- Poles: 0
- Fastest laps: 0
- Best finish: 18th in 2025

Previous series
- 2024–2025; 2023; 2023–2024; 2023; 2022–2023; 2022: FR Middle East; Euro 4; F4 Chinese; Formula Winter Series; Italian F4; ADAC F4
- Statistics up to date as of 27 October 2025.

Chinese name
- Simplified Chinese: 刘瑞祺
Transcriptions
Standard Mandarin
- Hanyu Pinyin: Liú Ruìqí

Ruiqi "Ricky" Liu (Chinese: 刘瑞祺; pinyin: Liú Ruìqí; born 4 September 2006) is a Chinese racing driver who last competed in the Formula Regional European Championship for Trident.

== Career ==
=== Karting ===
Liu began his karting career at the age of ten and achieved his first successes in 2018, winning rounds of the China Karting Championship in Shanghai and Jinhua. The following year, he would go on to win the Asian Karting Open Championship in the X30 Junior class, competing against the likes of Gerrard Xie and Bianca Bustamante.

==== 2017 ====
Liu set his debut in the Macao International Kart Grand Prix in 2017 with Mars Racing Team. In the Mini Rok class of the Asian Karting Open Championship, Liu finished 19th in the final race.

==== 2018 ====
Liu returned to the International Kart Grand Prix in Macao, again in the Mini Rok class of the Asian Karting Open Championship with Mars Racing Team. Liu would conclude the weekend by finishing seventh in the final.

==== 2019 ====
Liu made his last appearance in the International Kart Grand Prix in 2019 with Mars Racing Team, joining the Formula 125 Junior class of the Asian Karting Championship. He would finish the pre-final in 23rd and 18th in the final.

=== Formula 4 ===
==== 2022 ====
Liu made his single-seater debut at the end of 2022, where he competed in the Lausitzring round of the ADAC Formula 4 Championship, racing for US Racing. He achieved a best result of ninth from the second of the three races.

Liu also participated in the final two rounds of the Italian F4 Championship for AKM Motorsport with limited success, achieving a best result of 28th in Mugello and finishing 55th and last in the drivers' championship.

==== 2023 ====
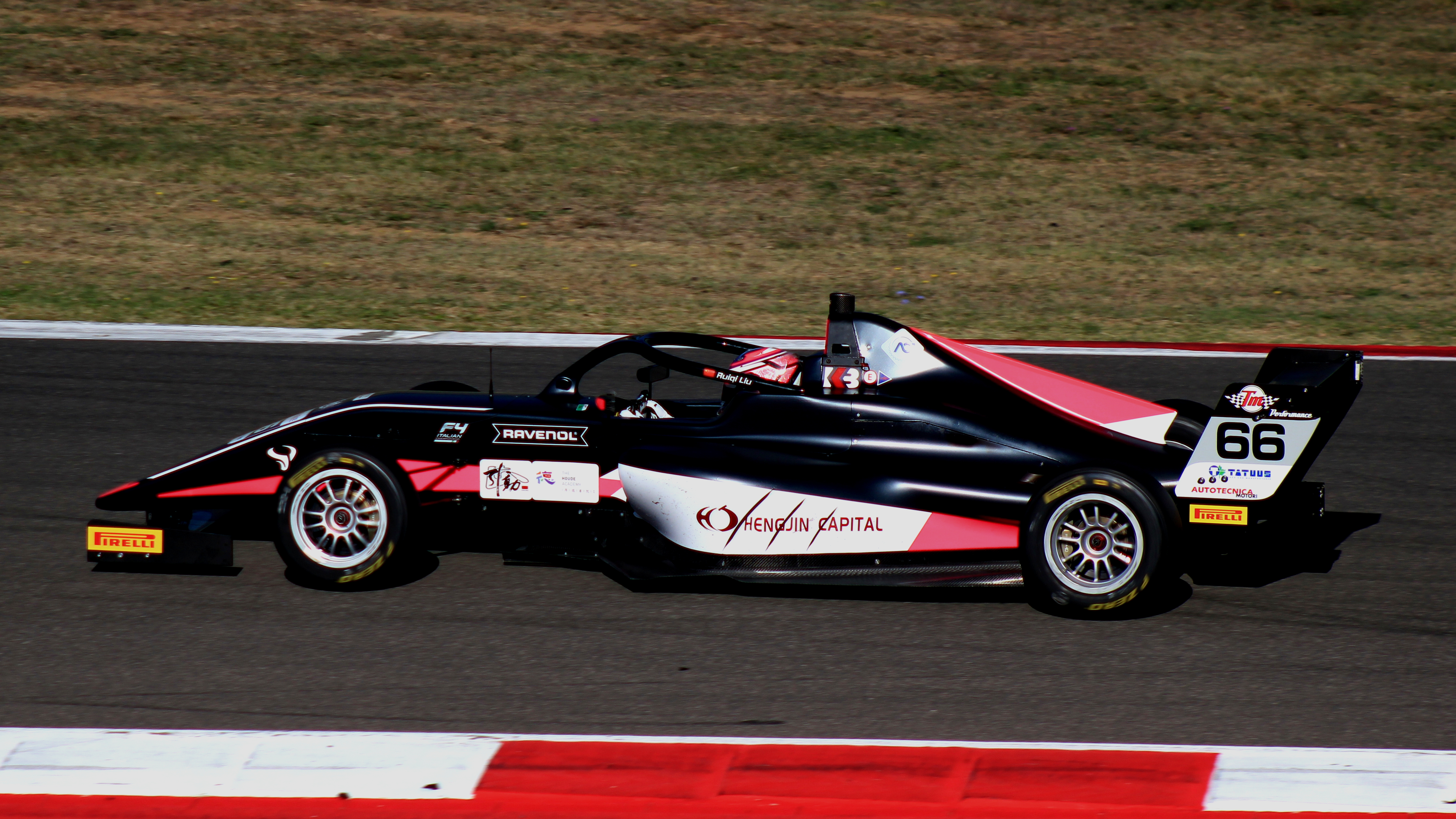
Liu driving at the Mugello Circuit during the 2023 Italian F4 Championship

Liu started the year off in the newly-founded Formula Winter Series, competing for US Racing. He would end up fourth in the championship with three podiums and a fastest lap.

Liu's main campaign was a full season of the Italian F4 Championship, also with US Racing. Liu struggled to be competitive throughout the season, scoring no points and having a best result of 13th on multiple occasions. He would end up 30th in the drivers' championship, the last of his full-time teammates.

=== Formula Regional ===
==== 2024 ====
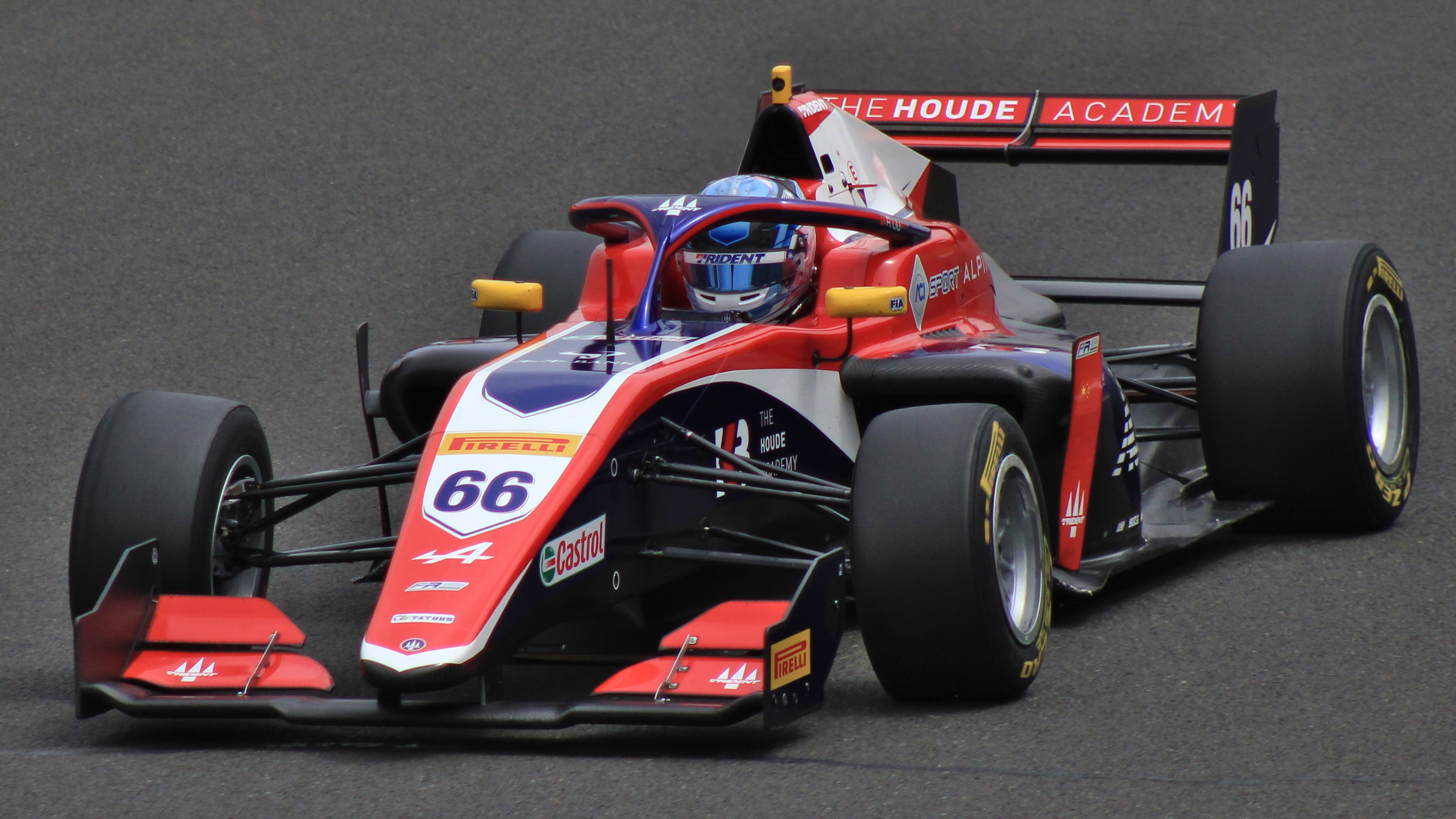
Liu driving at the Hungaroring during the 2024 Formula Regional European Championship

Liu competed in 2024 Formula Regional Middle East Championship with PHM AIX Racing.In December 2023, Liu was announced to be competing in the Formula Regional European Championship with Trident for the 2024 season, partnering Roman Bilinski and Alpine Academy member Nicola Lacorte. He also participated in Macau Grand Prix with PHM Racing.

==== 2025 ====
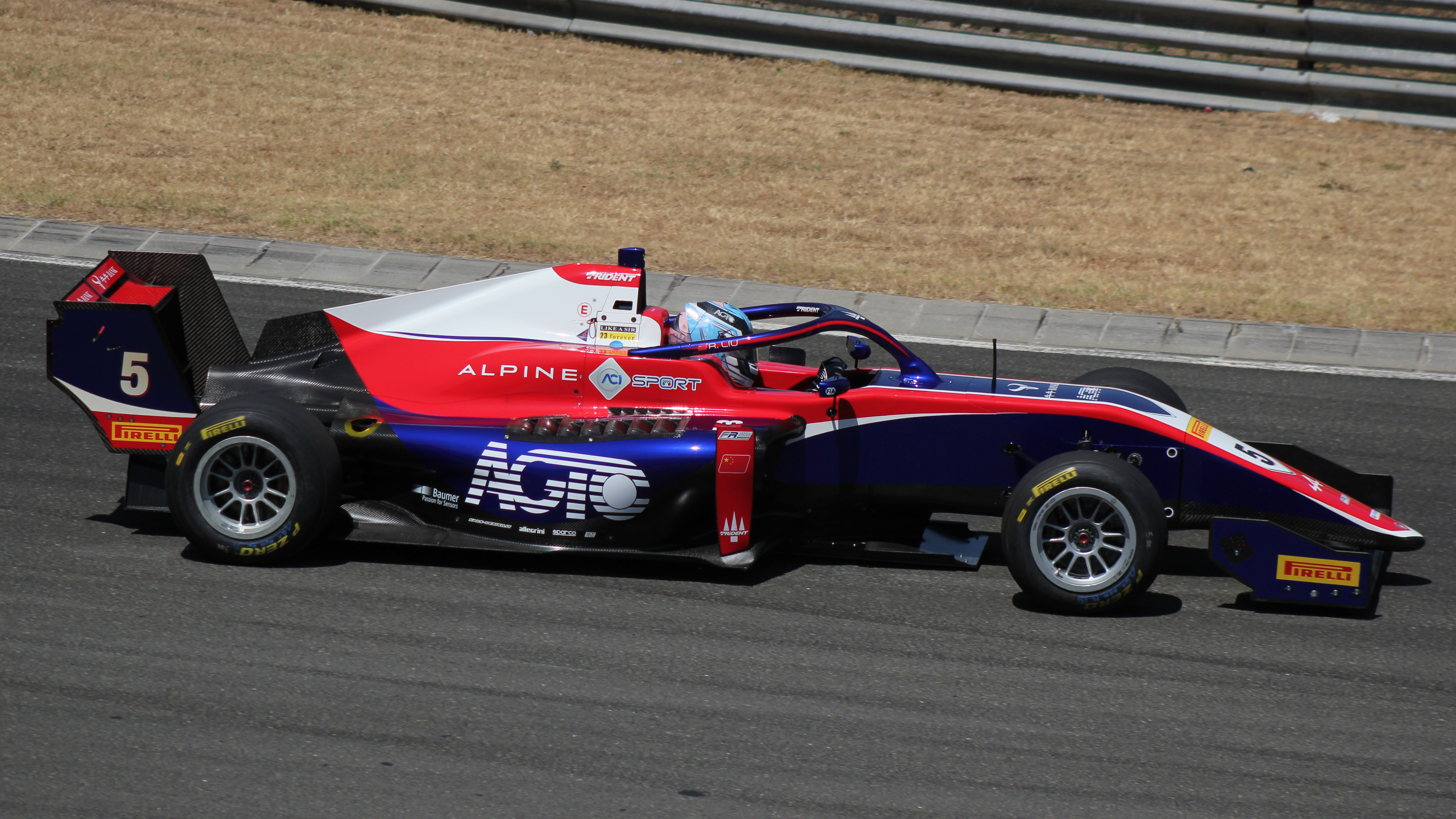
Liu driving at the Hungaroring during the 2025 Formula Regional European Championship

Liu raced in the Formula Regional Middle East Championship with Origine Motorsport.

Liu remained with Trident for the 2025 FRECA season, partnering Matteo De Palo and Nandhavud Bhirombhakdi. Following the season, Liu enrolled as a undergraduate student at New York University, potentially putting his racing career on hold.

== Karting record ==
=== Complete Macao International Kart Grand Prix results ===
Year	Series	Team	Class	Pre-Final	Final
2017	Asian Karting Open Championship	Mars Racing Team	Mini Rok	20th	19th
2018	Asian Karting Open Championship	Mars Racing Team	Mini Rok	?	7th
2019	Asian Karting Open Championship	Mars Racing Team	Formula 125 Junior	23rd	18th

=== Complete Macau Asia Karting Festival results ===
Year	Series	Team	Class	Final
2018	Asian Karting Open Championship	Prodigy Racing Team	Mini Rok	?
2019	Asian Karting Open Championship	Mars Racing Team	Formula 125 Open Junior	7th
2019	China Karting Championship	Mars Racing Team	Junior	3rd

== Racing record ==
=== Racing career summary ===
Season	Series	Team	Races	Wins	Poles	F/Laps	Podiums	Points	Position
2022	ADAC Formula 4 Championship	US Racing	3	0	0	0	0	4	19th
2022	Italian F4 Championship	AKM Motorsport	5	0	0	0	0	0	55th
2023	Formula Winter Series	US Racing	8	0	0	1	3	96	4th
2023	Italian F4 Championship	US Racing	21	0	0	0	0	0	30th
2023	Euro 4 Championship	US Racing	9	0	0	0	0	14	14th
2023	F4 Chinese Championship	Smart Life Racing Team	8	3	3	2	7	141	4th
2024	Formula Regional Middle East Championship	PHM AIX Racing	15	0	0	0	0	0	26th
2024	Formula Regional European Championship	Trident	20	0	0	0	0	2	23rd
2024	F4 Chinese Championship	Black Blade GP	2	0	0	0	1	25	15th
2024	Macau Grand Prix	PHM Racing	1	0	0	0	0	N/A	DNF
2025	Formula Regional Middle East Championship	Origine Motorsport	12	0	0	0	0	4	20th
2025	Formula Regional European Championship	Trident	20	0	0	0	0	4	18th
2026	Porsche Carrera Cup Asia	Phantom Global Racing	13	0	0	0	0	123	4th

* Season still in progress.

=== Complete ADAC Formula 4 Championship results ===
(key) (Races in bold indicate pole position) (Races in italics indicate fastest lap)

Year	Team	1	2	3	4	5	6	7	8	9	10	11	12	13	14	15	16	17	18	Pos	Points
2022	US Racing	SPA; 1	SPA; 2	SPA; 3	HOC; 1	HOC; 2	HOC; 3	ZAN; 1	ZAN; 2	ZAN; 3	NÜR1; 1	NÜR1; 2	NÜR1; 3	LAU; 1; 10	LAU; 2; 9	LAU; 3; 10	NÜR2; 1	NÜR2; 2	NÜR2; 3	19th	4

=== Complete Italian F4 Championship results ===
(key) (Races in bold indicate pole position) (Races in italics indicate fastest lap)

Year	Team	1	2	3	4	5	6	7	8	9	10	11	12	13	14	15	16	17	18	19	20	21	22	Pos	Points
2022	US Racing	IMO; 1	IMO; 2	IMO; 3	MIS; 1	MIS; 2	MIS; 3	SPA; 1	SPA; 2	SPA; 3	VLL; 1	VLL; 2	VLL; 3	RBR; 1	RBR; 2	RBR; 3	RBR; 4	MNZ; 1 Ret	MNZ; 2; 32	MNZ; 3 C	MUG; 1; 28	MUG; 2; 34†	MUG; 3; 29	55th	0
2023	US Racing	IMO; 1; 18	IMO; 2	IMO; 3 Ret	IMO; 4 Ret	MIS; 1; 28†	MIS; 2; 15	MIS; 3; 13	SPA; 1; 15	SPA; 2; 23	SPA; 3; 13	MNZ; 1; 28†	MNZ; 2; 18	MNZ; 3; 14	LEC; 1; 19	LEC; 2 Ret	LEC; 3; 26	MUG; 1; 18	MUG; 2; 21	MUG; 3; 13	VLL; 1; 32	VLL; 2; 14	VLL; 3; 20	30th	0

^{†} Did not finish, but classified

=== Complete Formula Winter Series results ===
(key) (Races in bold indicate pole position; races in italics indicate fastest lap)

Year	Team	1	2	3	4	5	6	7	8	DC	Points
2023	US Racing	JER; 1; 6	JER; 2; 2	CRT; 1; 5	CRT; 2; 6	NAV; 1; 6	NAV; 2; 2	CAT; 2; 3	CAT; 2; 5	4th	96

=== Complete F4 Chinese Championship results ===
(key) (Races in bold indicate pole position) (Races in italics indicate fastest lap)

Year	Team	1	2	3	4	5	6	7	8	9	10	11	12	13	14	15	16	17	18	19	20	DC	Points
2023	Smart Life Racing Team	**ZIC1**; **1**; 1	ZIC1; 2; 2	**ZIC1**; **3**; 1	ZIC1; 4; 3	NIC1; 1	NIC1; 2	NIC1; 3	NIC1; 4	PIC; 1; 3	PIC; 2 Ret	**PIC**; **3**; 2	PIC; 4; 1	ZIC2; 1	ZIC2; 2	ZIC2; 3	ZIC2; 4	NIC2; 1	NIC2; 2	NIC2; 3	NIC2; 4	4th	141
2024	Black Blade GP	SIC1; 1; 5	SIC1; 2; 3	CTC; 1	CTC; 2	CTC; 3	CTC; 4	NIC; 1	NIC; 2	NIC; 3	NIC; 4	SIC2; 1	SIC2; 2	SIC2; 3	SIC2; 4	ZIC; 1	ZIC; 2	ZIC; 3	ZIC; 4			15th	25

=== Complete Euro 4 Championship results ===
(key) (Races in bold indicate pole position; races in italics indicate fastest lap)

Year	Team	1	2	3	4	5	6	7	8	9	DC	Points
2023	US Racing	MUG; 1 Ret	MUG; 2; 15	MUG; 3; 9	MNZ; 1; 21	MNZ; 2; 22	MNZ; 3; 12	CAT; 1; 11	CAT; 2; 7	CAT; 3; 12	14th	14

=== Complete Formula Regional Middle East Championship results ===
(key) (Races in bold indicate pole position) (Races in italics indicate fastest lap)

Year	Entrant	1	2	3	4	5	6	7	8	9	10	11	12	13	14	15	DC	Points
2024	PHM Racing	YMC1; 1; 22	YMC1; 2; 15	YMC1; 3; 21	YMC2; 1; 24	YMC2; 2; 20	YMC2; 3; 18	DUB1; 1; 19	DUB1; 2 Ret	DUB1; 3; 17	YMC3; 1; 13	YMC3; 2; 21	YMC3; 3; 13	DUB2; 1; 17	DUB2; 2 Ret	DUB2; 3; 24	26th	0
2025	Origine Motorsport	YMC1; 1; 14	YMC1; 2; 22†	YMC1; 3; 19	YMC2; 1; 13	YMC2; 2; 17	YMC2; 3; 11	DUB; 1; 13	DUB; 2; 13	DUB; 3; 11	YMC3; 1; 19	YMC3; 2; 13	YMC3; 3; 20	LUS; 1	LUS; 2	LUS; 3	20th	4

=== Complete Formula Regional European Championship results ===
(key) (Races in bold indicate pole position) (Races in italics indicate fastest lap)

Year	Team	1	2	3	4	5	6	7	8	9	10	11	12	13	14	15	16	17	18	19	20	DC	Points
2024	Trident	HOC; 1; 17	HOC; 2; 18	SPA; 1; 18	SPA; 2; 18	ZAN; 1; 25	ZAN; 2; 23	HUN; 1; 10	HUN; 2; 18	MUG; 1; 13	MUG; 2; 10	LEC; 1; 14	LEC; 2; 17	IMO; 1; 17	IMO; 2; 18	RBR; 1 Ret	RBR; 2; 18	CAT; 1; 18	CAT; 2 Ret	MNZ; 1; 24†	MNZ; 2; 20	23rd	2
2025	Trident	MIS; 1; 14	MIS; 2; 12	SPA; 1; 18	SPA; 2; 14	ZAN; 1; 19	ZAN; 2; 15	HUN; 1; 20	HUN; 2; 21	LEC; 1; 13	LEC; 2; 21	IMO; 1; 14	IMO; 2; 9	RBR; 1; 17	RBR; 2; 19	CAT; 1; 16	CAT; 2; 12	HOC; 1; 11	HOC; 2 Ret	MNZ; 1; 10	MNZ; 2; 14	18th	4

=== Complete Macau Grand Prix results ===
Year	Team	Car	Qualifying	Qualifying Race	Main Race
2024	(Germany) PHM Racing	Tatuus F3 T-318	22nd	22nd	DNF
