= Tiago Rodrigues (racing driver) =

Macanese racing driver (born 2007)

Tiago Rodrigues 帝雅戈·洛迪古斯
- Rodrigues in 2026
- Nationality: Macanese
- Full name: Tiago Golovko Rodrigues
- Born: 19 June 2007 (age 19) Macau

F4 Middle East Championship career
- Debut season: 2025
- Current team: Evans GP
- Car number: 3
- Starts: 15 (15 entries)
- Wins: 0
- Podiums: 0
- Poles: 0
- Fastest laps: 0
- Best finish: 14th in 2025

Previous series
- 2024 2024 2023 2023: F4 Australian; F4 UAE; F4 South East Asia; F4 Chinese

Championship titles
- 2023: F4 Chinese

Tiago Golovko Rodrigues (Chinese: 帝雅戈·洛迪古斯; pinyin: Dìyǎgēluòdígǔsī; Jyutping: Dai3 ngaa5 gwo1 lok6 dik6 gu2 si1; Portuguese pronunciation: [ti.ˈa.gu ʁu.ˈdɾi.gɨʃ]) (born 19 June 2007) is a Macanese racing driver who has most recently competed in the F4 Middle East Championship with Evans GP. He won the F4 Chinese Championship in 2023.

== Career ==
=== Karting ===
Rodrigues started karting in 2022, and has been competing in various Macanese championships since then, notably the AAMC Karting Championship.

==== AAMC Karting Championship — X30 Senior ====
Rodrigues participated in the X30 Senior Macanese Championship at Coloane Karting Track for the first time in 2022.

Rodrigues would finish second and third for races 1 and 2 respectively in round 1, scoring 36 points in the Club Race Championship. He was the champion of the National Race Championship. He would finish fourth in both races of round 2 and score 22 points in the Club Race Championship. In the end, Rodrigues classified third overall and first in the National Race Championship.

==== 2022 ====
The first time Rodrigues raced in the KZ category was in 2022. That year, he joined one race of the AAMC Karting Championship which was held at the Coloane Karting Track in Macau.

Rodrigues geared up for the Establishment of the Macau SAR Cup, which was the final round of the season, finishing second in the Pre-Final and won the Final.

==== 2023 ====
In 2023, Rodrigues continued racing in the KZ Championship.

In round 1, Rodrigues won the Pre-Final, allowing him to start from pole position in the 17-lap Final. Rodrigues did not manage to convert it into a win. Liao Yan Yik from Hong Kong overtook Rodrigues in the first lap and Rodrigues finished 2nd last.

Rodrigues later finished third in both the Pre-Final and Final in round 2.

In round 3, Rodrigues finished behind Liao Yan Yik in both the Pre-Final and Final. Rodrigues was able to score 40 points on the weekend by ending in second place in both races.

In the fourth round, Rodrigues finished third in both the Pre-Final and Final. In the Final, a red flag was issued on the first lap due to collisions from other racers. Rodrigues failed to win as Marcus Cheong continued extending his lead.

Rodrigues was leading the championship before the final round of the season. However, technical issues of his kart were encountered, preventing Rodrigues to finish in race 1; hence, Rodrigues would start from 13th in race 2. He finished fourth in the Final, dropping him to third in the championship.

Rodrigues claimed his championship trophy for third position in the AAMC Prize Presentation Ceremony on 26 January 2024.

==== 2024 ====
On 2 March 2024, it was announced that Rodrigues would join the championship again.

In round 1, Rodrigues topped the qualifying session, allowing him to start from pole position in the Pre-Final. He successfully converted to a win and placed himself first on the starting grid of the Final. In the first lap of the Final, Rodrigues was overtaken by Marcus Cheong, who started from second place. On lap 12, Cheong was passed by Rodrigues. Rodrigues crossed the finish line first, but he received a five-second penalty due to causing a collision. Rodrigues classified third.

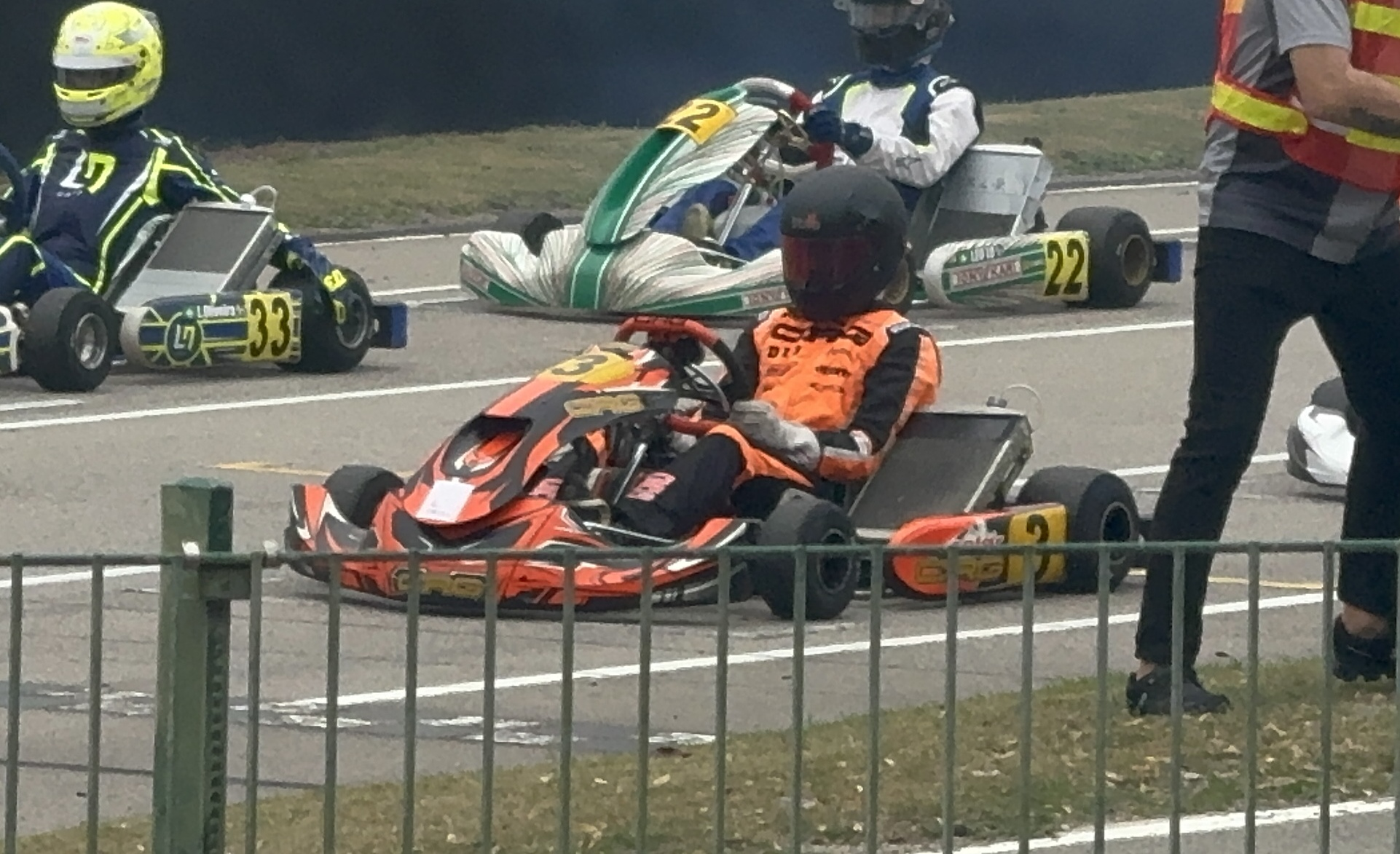
Rodrigues during the Final of round 2

Positive momentum continued in round 2, where Rodrigues would start from pole position and win the Pre-Final. Rodrigues would be leading the Final for most of the time, until he was overtaken by Liao Yan Yik and Marcus Cheong. Rodrigues crossed the finish line third, but was classified second due to a penalty given to Liao because of a false start.

Rodrigues was set to start from second in round 3's Pre-Final. However, Marcus Cheong, who qualified for pole position, had an engine failure of his kart and could not start the following races. Rodrigues won and set the fastest laps in both the Pre-Final and Final. Due to Cheong's absence, Rodrigues became the championship leader with 136 points. He stated that it wasn't really hard to win because most of his competitions had had very tough races and had some difficult circumstances to deal with, during a post-race interview.

No points were granted for Rodrigues in round 4. Due to the extension of the thunderstorm signal, the qualifying session was delayed and the Pre-Final was canceled. Rodrigues finished second in qualifying. The Final was later canceled as well due to the second hoisting of the thunderstorm signal.

Rodrigues also geared up for the Macau Kart Grand Prix, which had not been held since 2019. He entered the KZ class, which was the fifth round of the championship. Rodrigues achieved a pole to win in the Pre-Final, which set him to start from the pole again in the Final. At the beginning of the Final, Rodrigues immediately dropped to fourth due to a poor start. He regained two positions on the second lap at the first and second corners of the circuit. Rodrigues took the lead of the race at the final corner of lap 8, but mistakenly missed turn one and placed himself in the runoff area, dropping him down to fourth. Rodrigues was battling for third position at the end of lap 9, he came side by side with Maximiano Manhao and successfully gained a position as Manhao went wide. Rodrigues initially finished third in the Final, but was given a 5-second time penalty due to an incorrect position of front fairing.

Rodrigues would start from pole in the Pre-Final of round 6. He would win and set the fastest lap in the Pre-Final, allowing him to start from pole again in the Final. Rodrigues dropped down to fourth at the start but took the lead in lap 3. Rodrigues set the fastest lap of 0:46:587 in the Final and won with over a tem-second margin. "I think that the start could have been a little bit better because I started in the pole position but after the start, I dropped to the fourth position, but then I made my way up to second. Then, I started catching the driver who was in the first position. He had a problem so he retired and I managed to go to the first position that way. Then, from that went on it was just about keeping the pace, not doing any mistakes, and finishing the race." said Rodrigues during a post-race interview.

Rodrigues qualified second in round 7's Pre-Final. He would finish the Pre-Final in second. The Final was suspended after two laps and did not resume due to the hoisting of the thunderstorm signal. The awards of the podium were granted according to the Pre-Final classification. Points were only granted for the Pre-Final.

The final round of the championship was held as one of the competitions in the Macau International Kart Grand Prix. Rodrigues qualified second. During a post-qualifying interview, he expressed that he should have done better to get the pole position, considering his past experience, but it did not happen. He also mentioned that it was not something he could not achieve, but he would push harder to the following day's races as he had not driven a kart for a while. He would initially finish fourth in the Pre-Final, but was given a post-race penalty which dropped him to seventh. Rodrigues would conclude the final race of the round in seventh. He was crowned as the champion for the first time in the local karting championship with 262 points.

Rodrigues would initially participate in the KZ class in the second weekend of the 2024 Macau International Kart Grand Prix. However, he was later withdrawn from the race.

=== Formula 4 ===
==== Formula 4 Chinese Championship ====
Rodrigues made his car racing debut in the 2023 F4 Chinese Championship with Champ Motorsport. He took home his first podium during race 3 of the first round at the Zhuhai International Circuit.

Rodrigues took three wins and four podiums in the second round at the Ningbo International Circuit.

Rodrigues took his first pole position for race 1 at the Pingtan Ruyi Lake International Circuit, however, he did not convert that to a win, falling behind Liu Kai Shun in race 1. He would later win race 2 and finish on the podium in race 3 and race 4.

The fourth round of the year at the Zhuhai International Circuit would see Rodrigues take his second pole position, yet he failed to convert it to a win as he finished behind Xu Yingjie, Hu Chengru, and Patrick Tsang.

In round five, Rodrigues was crowned as the champion of the F4 Chinese Championship with 33 points ahead of the Hong Kong racer Liu Kai Shun. By winning the championship, he was invited to the 2023 FIA Rally & Circuit Prize Giving Ceremony which was held in Baku.

==== Formula 4 South East Asia Championship ====
Rodrigues also geared up for an assault on the returning Formula 4 South East Asia Championship in 2023. He would finish on the podium in all three races that weekend at the Zhuzhou International Circuit and placed himself on the top of the driver's championship.

Rodrigues didn't participate in the remaining rounds at Sepang International Circuit to save the budget for the Formula 4 UAE Championship in the following year. This caused him to gradually drop from the lead to fifth in the final standings.

==== Macau Formula 4 Race ====
Rodrigues participated in the Formula 4 event in his hometown's Macau Formula 4 Race, also known as Macau Asia Formula 4, in 2023. Rodrigues qualified eighth for the qualification race and felt satisfied with it. However, he believed that he could have done better. Rodrigues finished eighth in the qualification race under wet conditions, and sixth in the final race, behind Taiwanese racer Ethan Ho.

==== Formula 4 UAE Championship ====
After saving enough budget for the championship by dropping out of the last two rounds in the 2023 Formula 4 South East Asia Championship, on 8 January 2024, it was announced that Rodrigues would join Xcel Motorsport for the full 2024 season of the Formula 4 UAE Championship.

Rodrigues had a "bittersweet weekend" in the first round of the championship at Yas Marina Circuit. Starting from the 26th position in race 1, he maneuvered through a total of 33 cars, finishing in 19th place. The momentum continued into race 2, where Rodrigues started in the 19th and advanced to the 13th position by the end. In race 3, despite starting from 21st, he crossed the finish line in the 15th position.

During the first race of round 2, Rodrigues had a good start from 14th to tenth but then had collisions with Alvise Rodella, who was his teammate, and Jules Caranta. The incident damaged his front wing. Rodrigues made collisions again in the penultimate lap, with his teammate Liu Kai Shun, from Hong Kong. He finished the race in 30th at last. Rodrigues collided with Peter Bouzinelos in the second race, causing the safety car to be deployed. Rodrigues was retired from the race. This made his position dropped in the driver's championship. In race 3, Rodrigues would finish in 15th.

The third round continued at Dubai Autodrome, Rodrigues finished tenth and seventh in qualifying 1 and 2 respectively. Despite damaging his front wing on the final lap, Rodrigues managed to finish eighth in race 1. In race 2, Rodrigues started from fifth position but got pushed off in the final laps and finished 11th. He would start from seventh in race 3 but collided with Deagen Fairclough on the last lap when fighting for fourth position which made him finish 26th at last.

For the fourth round of the season in Yas Marina Circuit, Rodrigues first qualified 19th for race 1. However, he started from the 21st position at the end as a penalty was given for causing a collision in the third race of the previous round. Rodrigues would finish 22nd in the race which made him start from the same position in race 2. However, he could not convert it to points again by finishing 28th. In the weekend's final race, Rodrigues showed improvement by starting from 27th and finishing 15th.

The final round returned to Dubai Autodrome on 16–18 February. Rodrigues qualified 15th and 14th for races 1 and 2 respectively. He wouldn't be able to score points in all three races as contact occurred during the races, causing him to lose several positions.

By scoring points once in the season, Rodrigues finished the season in 22nd position in the driver's championship with four points in total.

==== Formula 4 Australian Championship ====
After applying for the financial support plan from the Sports Bureau of Macau SAR Government, Rodrigues returned to Formula 4 after a six-month absence since the 2024 Formula 4 UAE Championship. He was announced to join the fourth round of the championship at Sepang International Circuit with Evans GP. Rodrigues would qualify first and second for races 1 and 3 respectively. In the first race, Rodrigues claimed victory from pole position. Rodrigues was supposed to start from pole position in race 2 but encountered a gearbox issue before the start. He would miss the formation lap and start from the pit lane. Due to Rodrigues's team personnel staying on track for an exceeded time, Rodrigues received a 15-second drive-through penalty and finished tenth with the fastest lap. In the third race, Rodrigues started from second position but dropped down to fourth in the first lap. His momentum was not enough to convert another podium-finishing position as he concluded the race in fourth, behind his Australian teammate Cooper Webster.

==== Formula 4 Middle East Championship ====
Rodrigues returned to the Middle East for another F4 season in 2025 with Evans GP.

In the season-opener at the Yas Marina Circuit, Rodrigues qualified eighth and ninth in the two qualifying sessions respectively. He would finish 12th in the first race, enough to score a point in the updated points system. In race 2, Rodrigues started from 12th but pitted during the race due to a collision, dropping him to 21st after rejoining the track. Rodrigues made a recovery by gaining five positions in the end, finishing in 15th. Rodrigues failed to score points again in race 3. He started in ninth but had a ten-place drop in the first lap. He would recover to 14th in the end.

In the second round, Rodrigues qualified 13th and 12th for races 1 and 3, respectively. In race 1, Rodrigues retired in the final lap, and classified as 24th. Before retiring, Rodrigues was 12th in the race. The aforementioned result determined his starting grid position for race 2, where he gained five positions and finished 19th. In race 3, Rodrigues crashed and retired during one of the safety car periods.

=== Formula Regional ===
==== FIA Formula Regional World Cup ====
On 9 October 2024, Rodrigues was announced to set his Formula Regional debut with Evans GP in the Macau Grand Prix. Rodrigues stated that he wouldn't focus much on expectations as it was pointless, but the job he had to do in order to achieve the best result as possible. Rodrigues finished the first free practice session in 26th as problems were encountered with the gearbox of his car. Rodrigues dealt with more mechanical issues during the first qualifying and retired from the session as he went to the escape road next to the Lisboa bend, finishing in 27th. "I don't really understand what happened. As I switched to the third gear, the car stopped functioning. I am joining tomorrow's second qualifying session. I wouldn't end up in this position if my car was operating fine. It would be great to finish in the top ten since there are many racers with much experience in Formula Regional, and some of them are part of the junior academy of F1 teams. I think I will be able to finish in the top ten." said Rodrigues during an interview after the session. In Free Practice 2, Rodrigues finished in the 24th position. Rodrigues would qualify 21st in the final qualifying session. In the Qualification Race, Rodrigues started from the 21st and concluded in the 17th. Rodrigues could not finish a single lap in Sunday's main race. He was forced to retire due to a collision at the Lisboa bend. During a post-race interview, Rodrigues described the accident as 'unavoidable', and saying it was possible that he would stop racing, as he was still thinking about his future.

== Karting record ==
=== Karting career summary ===
Season	Series	Team	Position
2022	AAMC Karting Championship — X30 Senior		3rd
2022	AAMC Karting Championship — KZ		9th
2022	Lotus Cup		NC
2023	Macau Asia Karting Festival — KZ	Solar Racing Team	4th
2023	AAMC Karting Championship — KZ		3rd
2023	TCR Cup		NC
2024	AAMC Karting Championship — KZ		1st
2025	AAMC Karting Championship — KZ Open		8th

== Racing record ==
=== Racing career summary ===
Season	Series	Team	Races	Wins	Poles	F/Laps	Podiums	Points	Position
2023	F4 Chinese Championship	Champ Motorsport	20	7	2	6	15	346	**1st**
2023	Formula 4 South East Asia Championship	Asia Racing Team	3	0	0	1	3	51	5th
2023	Macau Formula 4 Race	Asia Racing Team	2	0	0	0	0	—N/a	6th
2024	Formula 4 UAE Championship	Xcel Motorsport	15	0	0	0	0	4	22nd
2024	Formula 4 Australian Championship	Evans GP	3	1	1	2	1	38	11th
2024	Macau Grand Prix	Evans GP	1	0	0	0	0	—N/a	DNF
2025	F4 Middle East Championship	Evans GP	15	0	0	0	0	29	14th
2025	F4 Chinese Championship	Champ Pro Racing	4	0	0	0	1	0	NC†
2025	FIA F4 World Cup		1	0	0	0	0	—N/a	10th

^{†} As Rodrigues was a guest driver, he was ineligible for points.

=== Complete F4 Chinese Championship results ===
(key) (Races in bold indicate pole position) (Races in italics indicate fastest lap)

Year	Team	1	2	3	4	5	6	7	8	9	10	11	12	13	14	15	16	17	18	19	20	DC	Points
2023	Champ Motorsport	ZIC1; 1; 5	ZIC1; 2; 5	ZIC1; 3; 3	ZIC1; 4; 5	NIC1; 1; 1	NIC1; 2; 3	NIC1; 3; 1	NIC1; 4; 1	**PIC**; **1**; 2	PIC; 2; 1	PIC; 3; 3	PIC; 4; 3	**ZIC2**; **1**; 4	ZIC2; 2; 1	ZIC2; 3; 2	ZIC2; 4; 1	NIC2; 1; 2	NIC2; 2 Ret	NIC2; 3; 1	NIC2; 4; 3	1st	346
2025	Champ Pro Racing	NIC; 1	NIC; 2	NIC; 3	NIC; 4	SIC; 1	SIC; 2	SIC; 3	SIC; 4	ZIC1; 1	ZIC1; 2	ZIC1; 3	ZIC1; 4	CTC; 1	CTC; 2	CTC; 3	CTC; 4	ZIC2; 1; 3	ZIC2; 2; 7	ZIC2; 3 Ret	ZIC2; 4 Ret	NC†	0

^{†} As Rodrigues was a guest driver, he was ineligible for points.

=== Complete Formula 4 South East Asia Championship results ===
(key) (Races in bold indicate pole position) (Races in italics indicate fastest lap)

Year	Entrant	1	2	3	4	5	6	7	8	9	10	11	Pos	Points
2023	Asia Racing Team	ZZIC1; 1; 3	ZZIC1; 2; 2	ZZIC1; 3; 2	MAC; 1; 8	MAC; 2; 6	SEP1; 1	SEP1; 2	SEP1; 3	SEP2; 1	SEP2; 2	SEP2; 3	5th	51

=== Complete Formula 4 UAE Championship results ===
(key) (Races in bold indicate pole position) (Races in italics indicate fastest lap)

Year	Team	1	2	3	4	5	6	7	8	9	10	11	12	13	14	15	DC	Points
2024	Xcel Motorsport	YMC1; 1; 19	YMC1; 2; 13	YMC1; 3; 15	YMC2; 1; 30	YMC2; 2 Ret	YMC2; 3; 15	DUB1; 1; 8	DUB1; 2; 11	DUB1; 3; 26	YMC3; 1; 22	YMC3; 2; 28†	YMC3; 3; 15	DUB2; 1; 15	DUB2; 2; 19	DUB2; 3; 22	22nd	4

† Did not finish, but classified.

=== Complete Formula 4 Australian Championship results ===
(key) (Races in bold indicate pole position; races in italics indicate fastest lap)

Year	Team	1	2	3	4	5	6	7	8	9	10	11	12	DC	Points
2024	Evans GP	BEN1; 1	BEN1; 2	BEN1; 3	BEN2; 1	BEN2; 2	BEN2; 3	SYD; 1	SYD; 2	SYD; 3	**SEP**; **1**; 1	SEP; 2; 10	SEP; 3; 4	11th	38

=== Complete Macau Grand Prix results ===
Year	Team	Car	Qualifying	Qualifying Race	Main Race
2024	(Australia) Evans GP	Tatuus F3 T-318	21st	17th	DNF

=== Complete F4 Middle East Championship results ===
(key) (Races in bold indicate pole position; races in italics indicate fastest lap)

Year	Team	1	2	3	4	5	6	7	8	9	10	11	12	13	14	15	DC	Points
2025	Evans GP	YMC1; 1; 12	YMC1; 2; 15	YMC1; 3; 14	YMC2; 1; 24†	YMC2; 2; 19	YMC2; 3 Ret	DUB; 1; 12	DUB; 2 Ret	DUB; 3; 9	YMC3; 1; 15	YMC3; 2; 13	YMC3; 3; 9	LUS; 1; 7	LUS; 2; 7	LUS; 3; 10	14th	29

† Did not finish, but classified.

=== Complete FIA F4 World Cup results ===
Year	Car	Qualifying	Quali Race	Main Race
2025	Mygale M21-F4	5th	DNF	10th

Sporting positions
Preceded by Gerrard Xie	F4 Chinese Championship; Champion; 2023	Succeeded by Oscar Pedersen
