= 2023 F4 Chinese Championship =

Motor racing competition

The 2023 F4 Chinese Championship (Shell Helix FIA F4 Chinese Championship) was the ninth season of the F4 Chinese Championship. It began on 19 May at Zhuhai International Circuit and ended on 19 November at Ningbo International Circuit.

== Teams and drivers ==
Teams	No.	Drivers	Status	Rounds
(China) Champ Motorsport (Note: Rodrigues, Zhang and Hu are entered with 'Champ' written in the Latin alphabet, while Tsang and Lau with 'Champ' written in the Chinese characters.)	2	(Hong Kong) Patrick Tsang	M	All
(China) Champ Motorsport	3	(Macau) Albert Cheung	M	5
(China) Champ Motorsport	5	(China) Hu Chengru		3–5
(China) Champ Motorsport	8	(Macau) Tiago Rodrigues		All
(China) Champ Motorsport	21	(China) Zhang Hongyu		1–2
(China) Champ Motorsport	53	(Hong Kong) Marco Lau	M	1–4
(China) Blackjack 21 Racing Team	4	(China) Pang Changyuan		5
(China) Blackjack 21 Racing Team	10	(China) Liu Tiezheng		4
(China) Blackjack 21 Racing Team	12	(China) Zhang Yu		2
(China) Blackjack 21 Racing Team	13	(Macau) Marcus Cheong		1, 3
(China) Blackjack 21 Racing Team	29	(China) Fu Zhenjiang	M	2
(China) Pointer Racing	6	(China) Huang Weibo		3
(China) Pointer Racing	88	(China) Huang Weibo		5
(China) Pointer Racing	7	(China) Fang Weiyuan		1
(China) Pointer Racing	16	(China) Wu Chenjie		5
(China) Pointer Racing	59	(China) Yang Yongkang	M	4
(China) Pointer Racing	99	(China) Jiang Wei		1–4
(China) Smart Life Racing Team	11	(China) Xu Yingjie		4
(China) Smart Life Racing Team	53	(Hong Kong) Marco Lau	M	5
(China) Smart Life Racing Team	66	(China) Liu Ruiqi		1, 3
(China) Smart Life Racing Team	69	(United States) Michael Farrens	M	1
(China) Smart Life Racing Team	72	(Hong Kong) Liu Kaishun		All
(China) Smart Life Racing Team	75	(China) Ren Juncheng		5
(China) Henmax Motorsport	14	(Hong Kong) Chui Ka Kam		2–3
(China) Henmax Motorsport	57	(China) Xie Rui	M	4
(China) Henmax Motorsport	61	(Hong Kong) Han Yingfu	M	All
(China) Henmax Motorsport	77	(Hong Kong) Wong Yiuming	M	5
(China) Chengdu Tianfu International Circuit Team	17	(China) Yang Shengwei		1–4
(China) GEEKE Team	22	(China) Jiang Fukang		1
(China) GEEKE Team	27	(China) Shi Wei		2
(China) GEEKE Team	33	(China) Lü Sixiang	M	2–5
(China) GEEKE Team	86	(China) Fei Jun		3–4
(China) Ningbo International Team	24	(China) Yang Peng		4–5
(China) Ningbo International Team	56	(China) Jing Zefeng		All
(China) GEEKE Pro Giantess	27	(China) Shi Wei		4
(China) Henmax T-1 Racing	28	(Hong Kong) Vivian Siu		1–2
(China) Henmax T-1 Racing	77	(Hong Kong) Wong Yiuming	M	1
(China) Ruisi Racing School	63	(China) Gan Yicheng		1–4

Icon	Class
M	Drivers that compete for the Masters Championship
G	Guest drivers ineligible for Drivers' Championship

== Race calendar and results ==
The provisional calendar featuring 5 rounds and 18 races was announced in February 2023. On 9 April 2023, the calendar was officially updated, Zhuhai International Circuit would host the first race instead of Zhengzhou International Circuit, and the second round in Ningbo International Circuit would be shifted one week backward. The round at Pingtan Ruyi Lake International Circuit was postponed by one week to 25–27 August. The round at Tianfu International Circuit was cancelled, and moved to Zhuhai International Circuit on the same date. The final round was supposed to take place during the 2023 edition of Macau Grand Prix, but the organisers of the Macanese event decided to replace the F4 Chinese round with a non-championship, invitation-only event within the revived 2023 Formula 4 South East Asia Championship season. The final round of the championship was moved to Ningbo International Circuit at 17-19 November.

Round		Circuit	Date	Pole position	Fastest lap	Winning driver	Winning team	Master class winner	Supporting
1	R1	Zhuhai International Circuit, Zhuhai	20 May	(China) Liu Ruiqi	(China) Jiang Fukang	(China) Liu Ruiqi	(China) Smart Life Racing Team	(Hong Kong) Wong Yiuming	Geely Super Cup Pro
1	R2	Zhuhai International Circuit, Zhuhai	20 May		(China) Liu Ruiqi	(Hong Kong) Liu Kaishun	(China) Smart Life Racing Team	(Hong Kong) Patrick Tsang	Geely Super Cup Pro
1	R3	Zhuhai International Circuit, Zhuhai	21 May	(China) Liu Ruiqi	(China) Liu Ruiqi	(China) Liu Ruiqi	(China) Smart Life Racing Team	(Hong Kong) Patrick Tsang	Geely Super Cup Pro
1	R4	Zhuhai International Circuit, Zhuhai	21 May		(Hong Kong) Liu Kaishun	(China) Jiang Fukang	(China) GEEKE Team	(Hong Kong) Marco Lau	Geely Super Cup Pro
2	R5	Ningbo International Circuit, Ningbo	24 June	(Hong Kong) Liu Kaishun	(China) Zhang Hongyu	(Macau) Tiago Rodrigues	(China) Champ Motorsport	(China) Lü Sixiang	Geely Super Cup Pro; GT Super Sprint Challenge; Open Formula Challenge
2	R6	Ningbo International Circuit, Ningbo	24 June		(China) Jing Zefeng	(China) Jing Zefeng	(China) Ningbo International Team	(China) Lü Sixiang	Geely Super Cup Pro; GT Super Sprint Challenge; Open Formula Challenge
2	R7	Ningbo International Circuit, Ningbo	25 June	(China) Zhang Hongyu	(Macau) Tiago Rodrigues	(Macau) Tiago Rodrigues	(China) Champ Motorsport	(China) Lü Sixiang	Geely Super Cup Pro; GT Super Sprint Challenge; Open Formula Challenge
2	R8	Ningbo International Circuit, Ningbo	25 June		(China) Jing Zefeng	(Macau) Tiago Rodrigues	(China) Champ Motorsport	(Hong Kong) Marco Lau	Geely Super Cup Pro; GT Super Sprint Challenge; Open Formula Challenge
3	R9	Pingtan Ruyi Lake International Circuit, Pingtan Island	26 August	(Macau) Tiago Rodrigues	(Macau) Tiago Rodrigues	(Hong Kong) Liu Kaishun (Note: Liu Ruiqi finished first but received a 5 seconds penalty. Liu Kaishun inherited the win.)	(China) Smart Life Racing Team	(China) Lü Sixiang	China GT Championship; Geely Super Cup Pro
3	R10	Pingtan Ruyi Lake International Circuit, Pingtan Island	26 August		(Hong Kong) Liu Kaishun	(Macau) Tiago Rodrigues	(China) Champ Motorsport	(Hong Kong) Marco Lau	China GT Championship; Geely Super Cup Pro
3	R11	Pingtan Ruyi Lake International Circuit, Pingtan Island	27 August	(China) Liu Ruiqi	(Hong Kong) Liu Kaishun	(Hong Kong) Liu Kaishun	(China) Smart Life Racing Team	(China) Lü Sixiang	China GT Championship; Geely Super Cup Pro
3	R12	Pingtan Ruyi Lake International Circuit, Pingtan Island	27 August		(Hong Kong) Liu Kaishun	(China) Liu Ruiqi	(China) Smart Life Racing Team	(Hong Kong) Marco Lau	China GT Championship; Geely Super Cup Pro
4	R13	Zhuhai International Circuit, Zhuhai	21 October	(Macau) Tiago Rodrigues	(Hong Kong) Liu Kaishun	(China) Xu Yingjie	(China) Smart Life Racing Team	(Hong Kong) Patrick Tsang	Geely Super Cup Pro
4	R14	Zhuhai International Circuit, Zhuhai	21 October		(Macau) Tiago Rodrigues	(Macau) Tiago Rodrigues	(China) Champ Motorsport	(China) Lü Sixiang	Geely Super Cup Pro
4	R15	Zhuhai International Circuit, Zhuhai	22 October	(Hong Kong) Liu Kaishun	(Hong Kong) Liu Kaishun	(Hong Kong) Liu Kaishun	(China) Smart Life Racing Team	(Hong Kong) Patrick Tsang	Geely Super Cup Pro
4	R16	Zhuhai International Circuit, Zhuhai	22 October		(Macau) Tiago Rodrigues	(Macau) Tiago Rodrigues	(China) Champ Motorsport	(China) Yang Yongkang	Geely Super Cup Pro
5	R17	Ningbo International Circuit, Ningbo	18 November	(Hong Kong) Liu Kaishun	(Macau) Tiago Rodrigues	(Hong Kong) Liu Kaishun	(China) Smart Life Racing Team	(China) Lü Sixiang	KTM X-Bow Cup
5	R18	Ningbo International Circuit, Ningbo	18 November		(Hong Kong) Liu Kaishun	(Hong Kong) Liu Kaishun	(China) Smart Life Racing Team	(Hong Kong) Wong Yiuming	KTM X-Bow Cup
5	R19	Ningbo International Circuit, Ningbo	19 November	(Hong Kong) Liu Kaishun	(Macau) Tiago Rodrigues	(Macau) Tiago Rodrigues	(China) Champ Motorsport	(Hong Kong) Wong Yiuming	KTM X-Bow Cup
5	R20	Ningbo International Circuit, Ningbo	19 November		(China) Ren Juncheng	(Hong Kong) Liu Kaishun	(China) Smart Life Racing Team	(China) Lü Sixiang	KTM X-Bow Cup

== Championship standings ==
Races	Position, points per race									
Races	**1st**	**2nd**	**3rd**	**4th**	**5th**	**6th**	**7th**	**8th**	**9th**	**10th**
4-races Rounds	25	18	15	12	10	8	6	4	2	1
2-races Rounds	50	36	30	24	20	16	12	8	4	2

=== Drivers' Championship ===
Pos	Driver	ZIC1				NIC1				PIC				ZIC2				NIC2				Pts
1	(Macau) Tiago Rodrigues	5	5	3	5	1	3	1	1	**2**	1	3	3	**4**	1	2	1	2	Ret	1	3	346
2	(Hong Kong) Liu Kaishun	3	1	Ret	4	**3**	4	2	4	1	2	1	2	11	Ret	**1**	2	**1**	1	**2**	1	331
3	(China) Jing Zefeng	6	4	4	2	4	1	3	2	4	3	4	4	10	Ret	4	5	Ret	4	4	4	230
4	(China) Liu Ruiqi	**1**	2	**1**	3					3	Ret	**2**	1									141
5	(China) Zhang Hongyu	4	9	2	6	2	2	**4**	3													103
6	(China) Yang Shengwei	7	7	5	Ret	6	6	5	5	7	6	8	6	Ret	7	12	9					92
7	(China) Hu Chengru									8	Ret	5	7	2	Ret	6	4	DSQ	3	5	Ret	83
8	(China) Lü Sixiang					5	5	7	Ret	6	Ret	6	13	Ret	4	13	8	4	Ret	Ret	6	78
9	(China) Jiang Fukang	2	3	7	1																	64
10	(China) Xu Yingjie													1	2	3	Ret					58
11	(China) Ren Juncheng																	Ret	2	3	2	51
12	(Hong Kong) Patrick Tsang	13	8	8	9	12	11	10	11	Ret	11†	7	Ret	3	10	5	Ret	7	DNS	12	Ret	49
13	(China) Huang Weibo									Ret	Ret	9	5					5	5	8	5	46
14	(China) Fei Jun									9	4	10	8	Ret	8	7	3					44
15	(China) Pang Chuangyang																	3	6	6	7	37
16	(China) Jiang Wei	9	10	6	14	7	Ret	15	8	10	9	12	12	6	Ret	11	12					32
17	(Hong Kong) Marco Lau	12	Ret	9	8	Ret	7	11	9	11	8	Ret	10	8	Ret	8	Ret	10	Ret	Ret	DNS	28
18	(China) Yang Peng													7	3	15	Ret	9	10	9	10	27
19	(China) Yang Yongkang													5	5	14	7					26
20	(China) Shi Wei					Ret	9	6	6					9	Ret	10	10					22
21	(Macau) Marcus Cheong	Ret	Ret	11	10					5	5	Ret	Ret									21
22	(China) Liu Tiezheng													Ret	6	9	6					18
23	(China) Gan Yicheng	8	6	Ret	7	Ret	WD	DNS	WD	NC	Ret	11	11	Ret	11	Ret	11					18
24	(Hong Kong) Wong Yiuming	10	Ret	12	11													6	8	10	8	18
25	(China) Zhang Yu					8	8	8	7													18
26	(China) Wu Chenjie																	8	7	7	11	16
27	(Hong Kong) Chui Ka Kam					9	10	9	12	Ret	7	Ret	9									13
28	(Macau) Albert Cheung																	11	9	11	9	4
29	(Hong Kong) Han Yingfu	15	14	14	Ret	11	14	14	14	12	10	Ret	14	12	9	16	13	12	11	13	12	3
30	(China) Fang Weiyuan	Ret	11	10	Ret																	1
31	(China) Fu Zhenjiang					Ret	12	12	10													1
32	(Hong Kong) Vivian Siu	14	13	15	12	10	13	13	13													1
33	(United States) Michael Farrens	11	12	13	13																	0
34	(China) Xie Rui													13	12	DNS	Ret					0
Pos	Driver	ZIC1				NIC1				PIC				ZIC2				NIC2				Pts

Colour	Result
Gold	Winner
Silver	Second place
Bronze	Third place
Green	Points classification
Blue	Non-points classification
Blue	Non-classified finish (NC)
Purple	Retired, not classified (Ret)
Red	Did not qualify (DNQ)
Red	Did not pre-qualify (DNPQ)
Black	Disqualified (DSQ)
White	Did not start (DNS)
White	Withdrew (WD)
White	Race cancelled (C)
Blank	Did not practice (DNP)
Blank	Did not arrive (DNA)
Blank	Excluded (EX)

**Bold** – Pole
Italics – Fastest Lap
† — Did not finish, but classified
