= 2024 Formula Regional Middle East Championship =

Motor racing championship

The 2024 Formula Regional Middle East Championship was a multi-event, Formula Regional open-wheel single seater motor racing championship. The championship featured a mix of professional and amateur drivers, competing in Formula Regional cars. It was the second season of the championship, held in January and February 2024.

Finnish driver Tuukka Taponen, driving for R-ace GP, won the Rookie Cup after the fourth round at Yas Marina with three races to spare. One race later, after the first encounter of the final weekend, he also won the overall Drivers' Championship, while his team clinched the Teams' Championship.

== Teams and drivers ==
All drivers competed using identical Tatuus-built Formula Regional cars powered by a 270HP turbocharged Alfa Romeo engine and on Giti tires.

Team	No.	Driver	Status	Rounds
(France) R-ace GP	1	(Finland) Tuukka Taponen	R	All
(France) R-ace GP	2	(Mexico) Jesse Carrasquedo Jr.	R	All
(France) R-ace GP	19	(United Kingdom) Kanato Le (Note: Le is a Japanese driver competing under a British licence.)	R	4–5
(France) R-ace GP	20	(Malta) Zachary David	R	All
(France) R-ace GP	34	(Norway) Martinius Stenshorne		1–3
(India) Mumbai Falcons Racing Limited	3	(United States) Ugo Ugochukwu	R	All
(India) Mumbai Falcons Racing Limited	8	(Brazil) Rafael Câmara		All
(India) Mumbai Falcons Racing Limited	13	(Australia) James Wharton	R	All
(India) Mumbai Falcons Racing Limited	23	(United Kingdom) Arvid Lindblad	R	1–3
(United Arab Emirates) Xcel Motorsport	4	(United Kingdom) Noah Lisle (Note: Lisle is an Australian driver competing under a British licence.)	R	All
(United Arab Emirates) Xcel Motorsport	96	(Ukraine) Yaroslav Veselaho	R	All
(Germany) PHM AIX Racing	5	(United Kingdom) Taylor Barnard		All
(Germany) PHM AIX Racing	15	(Italy) Brando Badoer	R	All
(Germany) PHM AIX Racing	18	(Thailand) Tasanapol Inthraphuvasak		All
(Germany) PHM AIX Racing	66	(China) Ruiqi Liu	R	All
(Netherlands) MP Motorsport	6	(Spain) Bruno del Pino		All
(Netherlands) MP Motorsport	26	(United Kingdom) Isaac Barashi (Note: Barashi is a British-Israeli-Portuguese driver competing under a British licence.)	R	3–5
(Netherlands) MP Motorsport	47	(India) Nikhil Bohra		All
(Netherlands) MP Motorsport	55	(Italy) Valerio Rinicella	R	1–2
(Netherlands) MP Motorsport	77	(Brazil) Emerson Fittipaldi Jr.		All
(France) Saintéloc Racing	7	(Brazil) Pedro Clerot	R	1–2
(France) Saintéloc Racing	7	(Denmark) Noah Strømsted	R	3
(France) Saintéloc Racing	14	(Italy) Matteo De Palo	R	1–2
(France) Saintéloc Racing	14	(Mexico) José Garfias		3–5
(France) Saintéloc Racing	44	(France) Théophile Naël	R	All
(France) Saintéloc Racing	74	(France) Enzo Peugeot	R	4–5
(Republic of Ireland) Pinnacle Motorsport	12	(Kazakhstan) Alexander Abkhazava	R	All
(Republic of Ireland) Pinnacle Motorsport	64	(Spain) Mari Boya		All
(Republic of Ireland) Pinnacle Motorsport	69	(United Kingdom) Finley Green	R	All
(Republic of Ireland) Pinnacle Motorsport	99	(Italy) Giovanni Maschio		All
(Australia) Evans GP	17	(France) Edgar Pierre	R	4–5
(Australia) Evans GP	27	(United Kingdom) John Bennett	R	All
(Australia) Evans GP	43	(Australia) Costa Toparis	R	All
(China) R&B Racing	22	(China) Wang Zhongwei		All
(China) R&B Racing	29	(China) Gao Yujia		All

Icon	Status
R	Rookie

== Race calendar ==
The 2024 calendar was officially announced on 21 August 2023. The Kuwait Motor Town rounds that featured in the 2023 season were removed from the calendar, with the championship consisting only of rounds held in the UAE.

Round		Circuit	Date	Support bill	Map of circuit locations
1	R1	(United Arab Emirates) Yas Marina Circuit, Yas Island (Corkscrew Circuit)	13 January	Formula 4 UAE Championship; Clio Cup Middle East	2024 Formula Regional Middle East Championship is located in United Arab Emirates
1	R2	(United Arab Emirates) Yas Marina Circuit, Yas Island (Corkscrew Circuit)	14 January	Formula 4 UAE Championship; Clio Cup Middle East	2024 Formula Regional Middle East Championship is located in United Arab Emirates
1	R3	(United Arab Emirates) Yas Marina Circuit, Yas Island (Corkscrew Circuit)	14 January	Formula 4 UAE Championship; Clio Cup Middle East	2024 Formula Regional Middle East Championship is located in United Arab Emirates
2	R4	(United Arab Emirates) Yas Marina Circuit, Yas Island (Grand Prix Circuit)	20 January	Middle East Trophy (6H of Abu Dhabi); Formula 4 UAE Championship; Gulf Radical Cup; Gulf ProCar	2024 Formula Regional Middle East Championship is located in United Arab Emirates
2	R5	(United Arab Emirates) Yas Marina Circuit, Yas Island (Grand Prix Circuit)	20 January	Middle East Trophy (6H of Abu Dhabi); Formula 4 UAE Championship; Gulf Radical Cup; Gulf ProCar	2024 Formula Regional Middle East Championship is located in United Arab Emirates
2	R6	(United Arab Emirates) Yas Marina Circuit, Yas Island (Grand Prix Circuit)	21 January	Middle East Trophy (6H of Abu Dhabi); Formula 4 UAE Championship; Gulf Radical Cup; Gulf ProCar	2024 Formula Regional Middle East Championship is located in United Arab Emirates
3	R7	(United Arab Emirates) Dubai Autodrome, Dubai Motor City (Grand Prix Circuit)	3 February	Asian Le Mans Series (4H of Dubai); Formula 4 UAE Championship	2024 Formula Regional Middle East Championship is located in United Arab Emirates
3	R8	(United Arab Emirates) Dubai Autodrome, Dubai Motor City (Grand Prix Circuit)	3 February	Asian Le Mans Series (4H of Dubai); Formula 4 UAE Championship	2024 Formula Regional Middle East Championship is located in United Arab Emirates
3	R9	(United Arab Emirates) Dubai Autodrome, Dubai Motor City (Grand Prix Circuit)	4 February	Asian Le Mans Series (4H of Dubai); Formula 4 UAE Championship	2024 Formula Regional Middle East Championship is located in United Arab Emirates
4	R10	(United Arab Emirates) Yas Marina Circuit, Yas Island (Grand Prix Circuit)	9 February	Asian Le Mans Series (4H of Abu Dhabi); Formula 4 UAE Championship; Clio Cup Middle East	2024 Formula Regional Middle East Championship is located in United Arab Emirates
4	R11	(United Arab Emirates) Yas Marina Circuit, Yas Island (Grand Prix Circuit)	10 February	Asian Le Mans Series (4H of Abu Dhabi); Formula 4 UAE Championship; Clio Cup Middle East	2024 Formula Regional Middle East Championship is located in United Arab Emirates
4	R12	(United Arab Emirates) Yas Marina Circuit, Yas Island (Grand Prix Circuit)	10 February	Asian Le Mans Series (4H of Abu Dhabi); Formula 4 UAE Championship; Clio Cup Middle East	2024 Formula Regional Middle East Championship is located in United Arab Emirates
5	R13	(United Arab Emirates) Dubai Autodrome, Dubai Motor City (Grand Prix Circuit)	17 February	Formula 4 UAE Championship; Gulf Radical Cup	2024 Formula Regional Middle East Championship is located in United Arab Emirates
5	R14	(United Arab Emirates) Dubai Autodrome, Dubai Motor City (Grand Prix Circuit)	18 February	Formula 4 UAE Championship; Gulf Radical Cup	2024 Formula Regional Middle East Championship is located in United Arab Emirates
5	R15	(United Arab Emirates) Dubai Autodrome, Dubai Motor City (Grand Prix Circuit)	18 February	Formula 4 UAE Championship; Gulf Radical Cup	2024 Formula Regional Middle East Championship is located in United Arab Emirates

== Race results ==
Round		Circuit	Pole position	Fastest lap	Winning driver	Winning team	Rookie winner
1	R1	(United Arab Emirates) Yas Marina Circuit	(United Kingdom) Taylor Barnard	(Thailand) Tasanapol Inthraphuvasak	(United Kingdom) Taylor Barnard	(Germany) PHM AIX Racing	(Finland) Tuukka Taponen
1	R2	(United Arab Emirates) Yas Marina Circuit		(United Kingdom) Taylor Barnard	(United Kingdom) Arvid Lindblad	(India) Mumbai Falcons Racing Limited	(United Kingdom) Arvid Lindblad
1	R3	(United Arab Emirates) Yas Marina Circuit	(United Kingdom) Taylor Barnard	(Norway) Martinius Stenshorne	(United Kingdom) Taylor Barnard (Note: Stenshorne crossed the finish line first, but received a five-second time penalty post race for leaving the track and gaining an advantage, allowing Barnard to inherit victory.)	(Germany) PHM AIX Racing	(United States) Ugo Ugochukwu
2	R4	(United Arab Emirates) Yas Marina Circuit	(Finland) Tuukka Taponen	(Finland) Tuukka Taponen	(Finland) Tuukka Taponen	(France) R-ace GP	(Finland) Tuukka Taponen
2	R5	(United Arab Emirates) Yas Marina Circuit		(Spain) Mari Boya	(France) Théophile Naël	(France) Saintéloc Racing	(France) Théophile Naël
2	R6	(United Arab Emirates) Yas Marina Circuit	(Finland) Tuukka Taponen	(Finland) Tuukka Taponen	(Finland) Tuukka Taponen	(France) R-ace GP	(Finland) Tuukka Taponen
3	R7	(United Arab Emirates) Dubai Autodrome	(United Kingdom) Taylor Barnard	(Finland) Tuukka Taponen	(United Kingdom) Taylor Barnard	(Germany) PHM AIX Racing	(Finland) Tuukka Taponen
3	R8	(United Arab Emirates) Dubai Autodrome		(Spain) Mari Boya	(India) Nikhil Bohra	(Netherlands) MP Motorsport	(Italy) Brando Badoer
3	R9	(United Arab Emirates) Dubai Autodrome	(Brazil) Rafael Câmara	(Brazil) Rafael Câmara	(Brazil) Rafael Câmara	(India) Mumbai Falcons Racing Limited	(Finland) Tuukka Taponen
4	R10	(United Arab Emirates) Yas Marina Circuit	(United Kingdom) Taylor Barnard	(Finland) Tuukka Taponen	(United Kingdom) Taylor Barnard	(Germany) PHM AIX Racing	(Finland) Tuukka Taponen
4	R11	(United Arab Emirates) Yas Marina Circuit		(Brazil) Rafael Câmara	(Brazil) Rafael Câmara	(India) Mumbai Falcons Racing Limited	(United States) Ugo Ugochukwu
4	R12	(United Arab Emirates) Yas Marina Circuit	(Finland) Tuukka Taponen	(Finland) Tuukka Taponen	(Finland) Tuukka Taponen	(France) R-ace GP	(Finland) Tuukka Taponen
5	R13	(United Arab Emirates) Dubai Autodrome	(Finland) Tuukka Taponen	(Finland) Tuukka Taponen	(Finland) Tuukka Taponen	(France) R-ace GP	(Finland) Tuukka Taponen
5	R14	(United Arab Emirates) Dubai Autodrome		(Thailand) Tasanapol Inthraphuvasak	(United Kingdom) Taylor Barnard	(Germany) PHM AIX Racing	(Australia) James Wharton
5	R15	(United Arab Emirates) Dubai Autodrome	(Finland) Tuukka Taponen	(Finland) Tuukka Taponen	(Finland) Tuukka Taponen	(France) R-ace GP	(Finland) Tuukka Taponen

== Season report ==
=== First half ===
The second season of the Formula Regional Middle East Championship opened up around Yas Marina's Corkscrew Layout with last year's runner-up Taylor Barnard taking a pair of pole positions for PHM AIX Racing. He held his first place ahead of R-ace GP's Tuukka Taponen all race, taking an unthreatened victory, while Taponen's teammate Martinius Stenshorne rose from seventh to the final podium spot. The second race saw a very similar outcome, with the top two, Mumbai Falcons's Arvid Lindblad and R-ace GP's Zachary David, holding stationary all race, while Stenshorne once again climbed from eighth to third. The third race saw a fight for the win for the first time when Stenshorne got past Mumbai Falcons's Ugo Ugochukwu at the start and then attacked Barnard for the lead. After two laps, he managed to get past and led Barnard and Ugochukwu home, before his move was judged to have been made off track. The ensuing penalty gave Barnard his second win, together with a six-point standings lead.

When the championship moved to the circuit's Grand Prix Layout one week later, Taponen was the man to beat, taking two pole positions in qualifying. The first race saw Saintéloc's Théophile Naël pitch Barnard into a spin at the start. Taponen converted his lead into a win, only threatened during a mid-race safety car restart by Stenshorne, who eventually finished second ahead of Pinnacle's Mari Boya. Naël's penalty for his move on Barnard moved him up the reverse grid into third, from where he was able to profit off Ugochukwu's poor start to claim the race lead. PHM's Tasanapol Inthraphuvasak moved into second, while Ugochukwu continued dropping down the order, allowing Boya to take another podium. Ugochukwu then collided with his teammate James Wharton and retired. Taponen was back on top for the final race, resisting pressure amid a last-lap safety car restart to take a second win ahead of Naël and Barnard. This saw him take the championship lead, while two pointless races saw Barnard drop to third.

After a break weekend, the championship moved to Dubai Autodrome for round three, where Barnard and Mumbai Falcons's Rafael Câmara shared pole positions. The pair started race one alongside each other, before Taponen overtook Câmara and started pressuring the leader. The pair battled all race, but Barnard held on to win. A similar battle for third between Câmara, Boya and Stenshorne ended with the former coming out on top. MP Motorsport's Nikhil Bohra took the lead off Naël at the start of race two, with the Frenchman then dropping down the order before eventually retiring. This allowed Inthraphuvasak and PHM's Brando Badoer to take the podium spots. The third race saw Taponen part of another battle for the lead. While his opponent was Câmara this time, the outcome was much the same. Câmara claimed the win, with Taponen second once again and Badoer in third. With Barnard only managing fourth after an overambitious move for the lead, Taponen extended his championship lead to 32 points.

=== Second half ===
Teams and drivers then returned to Yas Marina, where championship challengers Barnard and Taponen took the pole positions. The Brit resisted the Fin at the start of the first race and kept a steady gap to him from then on to take his fourth win of the year, with Evans GP's Costa Toparis five seconds back in third. MP's reverse grid polesitter Bruno del Pino was almost wiped out at a safety car restart during the second race, when others assumed the race had already begun again. His suspension then broke one lap later, resulting in Câmara taking the lead and another safety car. The Brazilian converted this lead into a win, with Ugochukwu coming second and David in third. The final race also had two safety car phases, but polesitter Taponen was unbothered by them to take another win. Wharton and David also both finished where they started, in second and third. Barnard was now 50 points behind Taponen, who, with only 75 points still on offer, had already wrapped up the Rookie Cup and all but secured the championship.

Taponen only needed to finish inside the points to deny Barnard any chance at the championship, but he began the final weekend in Dubai with two pole positions in qualifying. He claimed his championship in dominant fashion with a lights-to-flag victory in the first race, leading his teammate David home to also secure the Teams' Championship for R-ace GP. Ugochukwu came third, passing Badoer who had started second and dropped to fifth through the race. The penultimate race of the season was then won by Barnard, who thereby took the runner-up position for the second year in a row by starting third, dropping to fifth and fighting his way back into the lead. Inthraphuvasak and Wharton completed the podium. Taponen ended the season with his fifth win, the same amount as Barnard, by leading Badoer and Naël home in another dominant display. This saw him grow his final championship advantage to 79 points.

== Championship standings ==
=== Scoring system ===
Points were awarded to the top ten classified drivers.

Position	**1st**	**2nd**	**3rd**	**4th**	**5th**	**6th**	**7th**	**8th**	**9th**	**10th**
Points	25	18	15	12	10	8	6	4	2	1

=== Drivers' championship ===
Pos	Driver	YMC1			YMC2			DUB1			YMC3			DUB2			Pts
Pos	Driver	R1	R2	R3	R1	R2	R3	R1	R2	R3	R1	R2	R3	R1	R2	R3	Pts
1	(Finland) Tuukka Taponen	2	6	4	**1**	4	**1**	2	7	2	2	5	**1**	**1**	5	**1**	255
2	(United Kingdom) Taylor Barnard	**1**	8	**1**	16	22†	3	**1**	8	4	**1**	14	5	8	1	9	176
3	(Brazil) Rafael Câmara	5	Ret	Ret	4	6	13	4	5	**1**	9	1	6	4	12	8	128
4	(Malta) Zachary David	8	2	10	6	Ret	10	11	15	Ret	4	3	3	2	6	4	112
5	(Spain) Mari Boya	6	7	5	3	3	26†	3	6	Ret	NC	10	4	7	7	5	112
6	(Australia) James Wharton	4	24	7	5	Ret	5	28†	12	5	5	4	2	6	3	11	111
7	(United States) Ugo Ugochukwu	16	11	3	10	Ret	7	6	4	9	6	2	Ret	3	4	6	105
8	(Norway) Martinius Stenshorne	3	3	2	2	5	4	5	9	18							100
9	(Thailand) Tasanapol Inthraphuvasak	7	5	Ret	9	2	14	8	2	8	15	13	8	9	2	Ret	86
10	(Italy) Brando Badoer	Ret	21	11	11	8	9	7	3	3	Ret	15	7	5	25	2	76
11	(France) Théophile Naël	13	10	6	8	1	2	10	Ret	10	Ret	Ret	12	Ret	9	3	75
12	(India) Nikhil Bohra	14	16	13	12	Ret	8	9	1	7	8	6	22†	Ret	16	Ret	49
13	(United Kingdom) Arvid Lindblad	10	1	8	15	9	27†	14	10	24†							33
14	(Australia) Costa Toparis	21	25	18	14	18	Ret	12	14	21	3	8	9	14	14	12	21
15	(Kazakhstan) Alexander Abkhazava	9	4	16	Ret	15	16	20	17	17	7	Ret	23†	15	Ret	16	20
16	(Spain) Bruno del Pino	17	9	12	17	12	19	13	13	6	10	Ret	10	26	13	7	18
17	(Italy) Valerio Rinicella	11	26†	15	13	7	6										14
18	(Italy) Matteo De Palo	15	14	9	7	16	15										8
19	(United Kingdom) Noah Lisle	19	12	17	20	10	11	15	11	11	11	7	11	27	24	14	7
20	(Brazil) Emerson Fittipaldi Jr.	20	18	DSQ	26	Ret	12	21	22	12	17	11	15	10	8	19	5
21	(Italy) Giovanni Maschio	23	20	25†	18	23	17	24	23†	14	12	9	Ret	19	18	20	2
22	(United Kingdom) Kanato Le										19	Ret	Ret	11	10	13	1
23	(United Kingdom) John Bennett	12	13	19	DNS	13	22	18	24†	19	20	16	Ret	18	15	10	1
24	(France) Enzo Peugeot										16	12	Ret	12	11	17	0
25	(Mexico) Jesse Carrasquedo Jr.	24	19	14	19	11	24	23	19	25	14	DNS	16	13	21	15	0
26	(China) Ruiqi Liu	22	15	21	24	20	18	19	DNS	16	13	21	13	17	Ret	24	0
27	(Mexico) José Garfias							17	Ret	13	25†	17	14	16	19	18	0
28	(Brazil) Pedro Clerot	18	17	Ret	21	14	Ret										0
29	(United Kingdom) Isaac Barashi							22	Ret	15	18	18	19	21	Ret	Ret	0
30	(Denmark) Noah Strømsted							16	16	Ret							0
31	(China) Gao Yujia	26	22	22	22	17	21	25	18	23	21	Ret	17	20	17	23	0
32	(France) Edgar Pierre										22	Ret	18	23	20	21	0
33	(Ukraine) Yaroslav Veselaho	25	23	20	23	Ret	25†	27	21	20	24	19	21	22	Ret	Ret	0
34	(United Kingdom) Finley Green	DNS	Ret	23	27†	19	20	WD	WD	WD	Ret	Ret	20	25	22	Ret	0
35	(China) Wang Zhongwei	27	Ret	24†	25	21	23	26	20	22	23	20	Ret	24	23	22	0
Pos	Driver	R1	R2	R3	R1	R2	R3	R1	R2	R3	R1	R2	R3	R1	R2	R3	Pts
Pos	Driver	YMC1			YMC2			DUB1			YMC3			DUB2			Pts

Colour	Result
Gold	Winner
Silver	Second place
Bronze	Third place
Green	Points classification
Blue	Non-points classification
Blue	Non-classified finish (NC)
Purple	Retired, not classified (Ret)
Red	Did not qualify (DNQ)
Red	Did not pre-qualify (DNPQ)
Black	Disqualified (DSQ)
White	Did not start (DNS)
White	Withdrew (WD)
White	Race cancelled (C)
Blank	Did not practice (DNP)
Blank	Did not arrive (DNA)
Blank	Excluded (EX)

**Bold** – Pole

Italics – Fastest Lap

† – Driver did not finish the race, but was classified as they completed more than 75% of the race distance.

=== Rookie Cup ===
Pos	Driver	YMC1			YMC2			DUB1			YMC3			DUB2			Pts
Pos	Driver	R1	R2	R3	R1	R2	R3	R1	R2	R3	R1	R2	R3	R1	R2	R3	Pts
1	(Finland) Tuukka Taponen	2	6	4	1	4	1	2	7	2	2	5	1	1	5	1	315
2	(United States) Ugo Ugochukwu	16	11	3	10	Ret	7	6	4	9	6	2	Ret	3	4	6	178
3	(Australia) James Wharton	4	24	7	5	Ret	5	28†	12	5	5	4	2	6	3	11	172
4	(Malta) Zachary David	8	2	10	6	Ret	10	11	15	Ret	4	3	3	2	6	4	164
5	(France) Théophile Naël	13	10	6	8	1	2	10	Ret	10	Ret	Ret	12	Ret	9	3	135
6	(Italy) Brando Badoer	Ret	21	11	11	8	9	7	3	3	Ret	15	7	5	25	2	134
7	(United Kingdom) Arvid Lindblad	10	1	8	15	9	27†	14	10	24†							74
8	(United Kingdom) Noah Lisle	19	12	17	20	10	11	15	11	11	11	7	11	27	24	14	65
9	(Australia) Costa Toparis	21	25	18	14	18	Ret	12	14	21	3	8	9	14	14	12	62
10	(Kazakhstan) Alexander Abkhazava	9	4	16	Ret	15	16	20	17	17	7	Ret	23†	15	Ret	16	41
11	(Italy) Valerio Rinicella	11	26†	15	13	7	6										40
12	(United Kingdom) John Bennett	12	13	19	DNS	13	22	18	24†	19	20	16	Ret	18	15	10	28
13	(Italy) Matteo De Palo	15	14	9	7	16	15										26
14	(France) Enzo Peugeot										16	12	Ret	12	11	17	19
15	(United Kingdom) Kanato Le										19	Ret	Ret	11	10	13	18
16	(Mexico) Jesse Carrasquedo Jr.	24	19	14	19	11	24	23	19	25	14	DNS	16	13	21	15	16
17	(China) Ruiqi Liu	22	15	21	24	20	18	19	Ret	16	13	21	13	17	Ret	24	13
18	(United Kingdom) Isaac Barashi							22	Ret	15	18	18	19	21	Ret	Ret	7
19	(Denmark) Noah Strømsted							16	16	Ret							4
20	(Brazil) Pedro Clerot	18	17	Ret	21	14	Ret										2
21	(France) Edgar Pierre										22	Ret	18	23	20	21	2
22	(Ukraine) Yaroslav Veselaho	25	23	20	23	Ret	25†	27	21	20	24	19	21	22	Ret	Ret	0
23	(United Kingdom) Finley Green	DNS	Ret	23	27†	19	20	WD	WD	WD	Ret	Ret	20	25	22	Ret	0
Pos	Driver	R1	R2	R3	R1	R2	R3	R1	R2	R3	R1	R2	R3	R1	R2	R3	Pts
Pos	Driver	YMC1			YMC2			DUB1			YMC3			DUB2			Pts

=== Teams' Championship ===
Ahead of each event, teams nominated two drivers that accumulated teams' points.

Pos	Team	Pts
1	(France) R-ace GP	410
2	(Germany) PHM AIX Racing	240
3	(India) Mumbai Falcons Racing Limited	223
4	(Republic of Ireland) Pinnacle Motorsport	118
5	(France) Saintéloc Racing	83
6	(Netherlands) MP Motorsport	81
7	(Australia) Evans GP	22
8	(United Arab Emirates) Xcel Motorsport	7
9	(China) R&B Racing	0
