= 2024 Macau Grand Prix =

71st running of the Macau Grand Prix

Race details
- Date: 17 November 2024
- Official name: 71st Macau Grand Prix – FIA FR World Cup
- Location: Guia Circuit, Macau
- Course: Temporary street circuit
- Course length: 6.120 km (3.803 mi)
- Distance: 15 laps, 91.800 km (57.042 mi)
- Weather: Dry and clear

Pole position
Driver	(United States) Ugo Ugochukwu	R-ace GP

Fastest lap
Driver	(Germany) Oliver Goethe	MP Motorsport
- Time: 2:19.599 on lap 10

Podium
First	(United States) Ugo Ugochukwu	R-ace GP
Second	(Germany) Oliver Goethe	MP Motorsport
Third	(Mexico) Noel León	KCMG IXO by Pinnacle Motorsport

The 2024 Macau Grand Prix (formally the 71st Macau Grand Prix – FIA FR World Cup) was a motor race for Formula Regional cars held on the streets of Macau on 17 November 2024. The race itself was made up of two races: a ten-lap qualifying race that decided the starting grid for the fifteen-lap main event. The 2024 race was the 71st running of the Macau Grand Prix, the first for Formula Regional cars and the inaugural FIA FR World Cup.

== Background and entry list ==
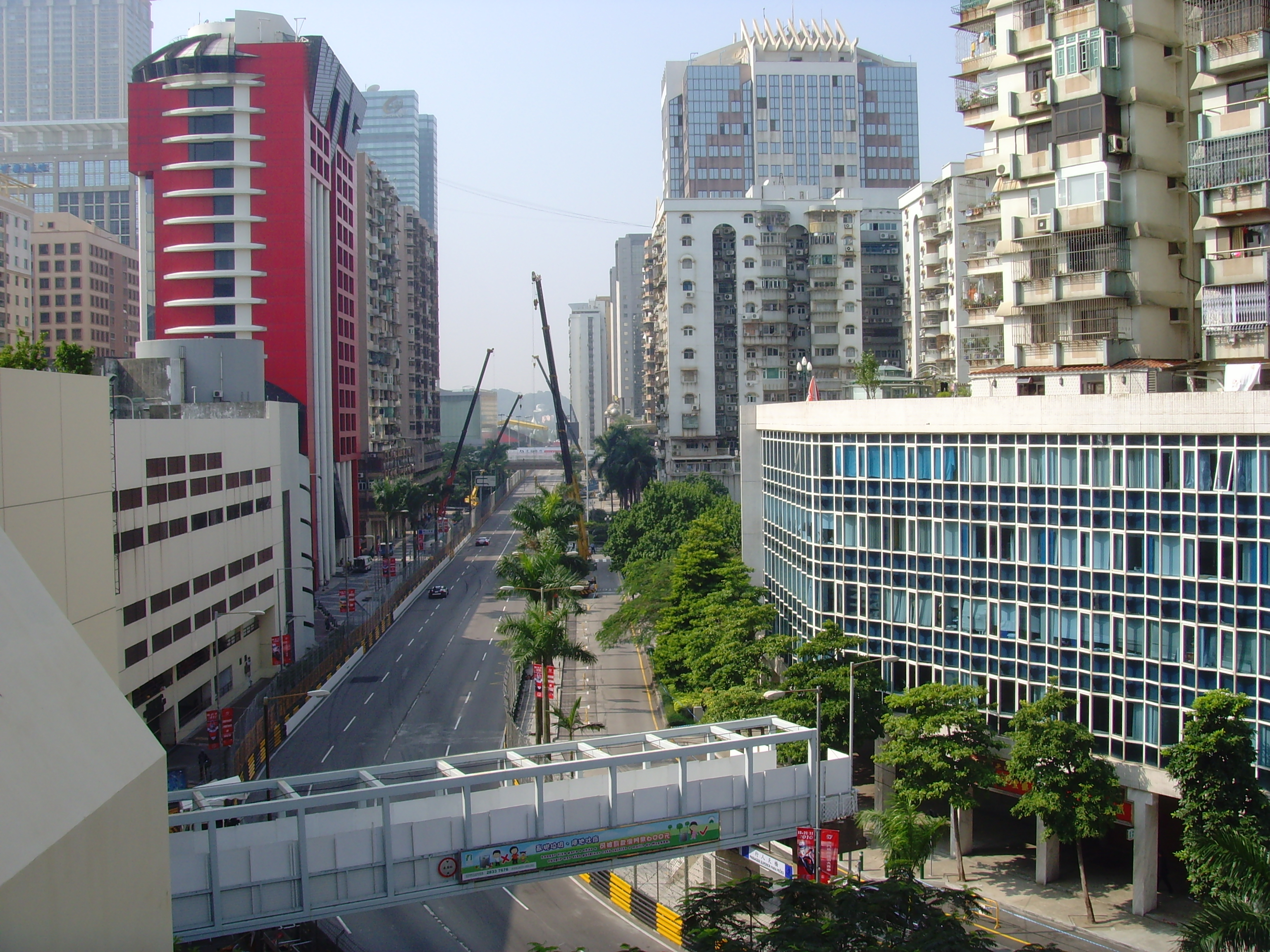
The Guia Circuit, where the race was held.

The Macau Grand Prix is a race considered by drivers as a stepping stone to higher motor racing categories such as Formula One, and is Macau's most prestigious international sporting event. The event was made a non-championship round of the FIA Formula 3 Championship for the first time in 2019, before the COVID-19 pandemic caused heavy disruptions, particularly concerning entry of foreign drivers into Macau. This caused the race to be held as a domestic Formula 4 event for three years, serving as a round of the Chinese Formula 4 Championship.

After a return of Formula 3 and other international series to Macau in 2023, the FIA announced that the 2024 event would see a switch to Formula Regional machinery. The organizing bodies called this change a "natural consequence of the evolution of the junior single-seater landscape over the last couple of years", with Formula Regional now effectively embodying the multi-region multi-spec nature that F3 had previously been synonymous with.

=== Entry list ===
All competitors used an identical Tatuus T-318 chassis with a 1.742 L (106 cu in) turbocharged inline-4 engine developed by Autotechnica and Alfa Romeo.

Team	No.	Driver
(Netherlands) MP Motorsport	1	(Germany) Oliver Goethe
(Netherlands) MP Motorsport	2	(Italy) Valerio Rinicella
(Netherlands) MP Motorsport	3	(Italy) Mattia Colnaghi
(France) R-ace GP	4	(United States) Ugo Ugochukwu
(France) R-ace GP	5	(France) Enzo Deligny
(France) R-ace GP	6	(Finland) Tuukka Taponen
(Republic of Ireland) KCMG IXO by Pinnacle Motorsport	7	(Mexico) Noel León
(Republic of Ireland) KCMG IXO by Pinnacle Motorsport	8	(Spain) Mari Boya
(France) Saintéloc Racing	14	(France) Théophile Naël
(France) Saintéloc Racing	15	(Kazakhstan) Alexander Abkhazava
(France) ART Grand Prix	16	(Australia) James Wharton
(France) ART Grand Prix	17	(France) Evan Giltaire
(France) ART Grand Prix	18	(Japan) Kanato Le
(Japan) TOM'S Formula	19	(Japan) Rikuto Kobayashi
(Japan) TOM'S Formula	20	(Japan) Jin Nakamura
(New Zealand) Kiwi Motorsport	21	(United States) Jett Bowling
(Germany) PHM Racing	25	(United Arab Emirates) Rashid Al Dhaheri
(Germany) PHM Racing	26	(Italy) Matteo De Palo
(Germany) PHM Racing	27	(China) Ruiqi Liu
(Hong Kong) SJM Theodore Prema Racing	30	(Sweden) Dino Beganovic
(Hong Kong) SJM Theodore Prema Racing	31	(United Kingdom) Freddie Slater
(Hong Kong) SJM Theodore Prema Racing	32	(Republic of Ireland) Alex Dunne
(Australia) Evans GP	33	(Macau) Tiago Rodrigues
(Australia) Evans GP	37	(Australia) Cooper Webster
(Australia) Evans GP	88	(United Kingdom) Kai Daryanani (Note: Daryanani is Indian, but competed under a British licence.)
(Japan) TGM Grand Prix	53	(Japan) Sota Ogawa
(Japan) TGM Grand Prix	55	(Japan) Rintaro Sato

== Practice and qualifying ==
Ahead of the event, the organising committee announced measures to minimise the impact of Typhoon Toraji, including potential schedule adjustments if necessary. The event featured two 40-minute practice sessions: the first on Thursday morning before the initial qualifying session, and the second on Friday before the second qualifying round. The qualification process itself was divided into two 40-minute sessions, with each driver's best time from either session determining their starting position for the qualification race.

The initial practice session took place under rainy conditions on a wet track, with all drivers using wet tires. MP Motorsport's Oliver Goethe set the fastest lap at 2:41.270s, finishing over two seconds ahead of Prema Racing's Freddie Slater and Alex Dunne. KCMG/Pinnacle's Noel León secured fourth place, while R-ace GP's Tuukka Taponen rounded out the top five. His teammate Ugo Ugochukwu came sixth, followed by Cooper Webster from Evans GP. The remainder of the top ten included Saintéloc Racing's Théophile Naël, the third Prema of Dino Beganovic, and R-ace GP's Enzo Deligny. The difficult conditions led to several crashes, including incidents involving Beganovic and TOM'S Formula's Rikuto Kobayashi, which triggered the first stoppage. Other incidents included a crash by Wharton and TGM Grand Prix's Sota Ogawa retiring with two and a half minutes left, ending the session early.

The first qualifying session on Thursday afternoon started in clear conditions on a drying track, with drivers on wet tires. PHM Racing's Ruiqi Liu crashed into Lisboa before any laps were completed, halting the session. It resumed with 35 minutes remaining, during which Goethe posted the fastest time at 2:03.482s, followed by Taponen and MP's Valerio Rinicella. Kiwi Motorsport's Jett Bowling then crashed heavily at Moorish, causing another stoppage before anyone else could set a time. As barrier repairs commenced, it began to rain, worsening track conditions. PHM's Rashid Al Dhaheri recorded the fastest time after the stoppage, over five seconds behind Goethe. The session faced further interruptions when Evans GP's Kai Daryanani and Tiago Rodrigues stalled at the Lisboa runoff area, prompting consecutive red flags. By that point, the rain had intensified further, with initial times after the session resumed almost 15 seconds slower than Goethe's opening lap. With more cars then venturing out on track, times were beginning to get faster again, but no improvements were made inside the top 15 positions. Kobayashi then caused another red flag with four minutes remaining after stopping at Lisboa. The session did not restart, confirming Goethe, Taponen, and Rinicella as the top three, with Al Dhaheri, Slater, and PHM's Matteo De Palo following. Dunne, Webster, Beganovic, and Naël completed the top ten.

The second practice session commenced on a wet track with light rain, which intensified as the session continued, leading to the fastest laps being set early on. León recorded the best time of the session at 2:35.772s, narrowly ahead of Naël by just over a tenth, while Kanato Le of ART Grand Prix secured third place. Evan Giltaire, also representing ART, finished fourth, followed by Boya, Wharton, and Taponen. Ugochukwu's lap placed him eighth, just ahead of Deligny, with Alexander Abkhazava of Saintéloc Racing completing the top ten. The session was marked by multiple interruptions as drivers tested the limits on the narrow circuit. Several cars were stopped at the Melco hairpin, causing a blockage, while Daryanani collided with the wall, necessitating a brief pause for clearance. Although all drivers managed to resume, Daryanani had another incident shortly after, resulting in further disruption. A significant crash by León at the Solitude Esses ultimately concluded the session two minutes prematurely.

A major accident during the preceding FIA GT World Cup qualifying session caused a 45-minute delay to the second qualifying session. With conditions now clear and dry, the first qualifying session's lap times were rendered obsolete. Following the initial laps, Beganovic led with a time of 2:22.199s. Goethe was the only driver to complete a second lap, which did not improve his time, before a significant three-car collision exiting Police corner triggered a red flag. Sato crashed into the wall exiting the corner, and Dunne and Beganovic collided with Sato’s stationary car. The subsequent pile-up led to Le stalling his vehicle, ending his session. The session resumed but was quickly halted again when Taponen hit the wall at the same corner. Drivers resumed laps with 28 minutes left in the session, and Beganovic's leading time was immediately beaten with León setting the fastest time at 2:20.190s. Goethe then improved, with Ugochukwu moving into second before Jin Nakamura of TOM'S Formula crashed at R Bend after Wharton hit him. This incident caused a nearly 30-minute red flag, extended due to necessary barrier repairs at the pit entry. Upon resumption, Ugochukwu set the fastest lap at 2:19.610, securing provisional pole position. Three further red flags followed for incidents involving Kobayashi, ART teammates Wharton and Giltaire, and Bowling, ending the session with three minutes remaining with some drivers able to set laps, but no changes to the top of the order. Ugochukwu secured pole, 0.014 seconds ahead of Goethe and León, with Deligny and Boya completing the top five. Webster, Slater, Naël, and Giltaire followed, with De Palo in tenth place.

=== Qualifying classification ===
Each of the driver's fastest lap times from the two qualifying sessions are denoted in bold.

Final qualifying classification
Pos	No.	Driver	Team	Q1 Time	Rank	Q2 Time	Rank	Gap	Grid
1	4	(United States) Ugo Ugochukwu	R-ace GP	2:40.805	14	**2:19.107**	1	—	1
2	1	(Germany) Oliver Goethe	MP Motorsport	2:32.482	1	**2:19.121**	2	+0.014	2
3	7	(Mexico) Noel León	KCMG IXO by Pinnacle Motorsport	2:40.529	13	**2:19.298**	3	+0.191	3
4	5	(France) Enzo Deligny	R-ace GP	2:40.524	12	**2:19.756**	4	+0.649	4
5	8	(Spain) Mari Boya	KCMG IXO by Pinnacle Motorsport	2:39.683	11	**2:19.817**	5	+0.710	5^{2}
6	37	(Australia) Cooper Webster	Evans GP	2:38.068	8	**2:20.252**	6	+1.145	6
7	31	(United Kingdom) Freddie Slater	SJM Theodore Prema Racing	2.37:535	5	**2:20.286**	7	+1.179	7
8	14	(France) Théophile Naël	Saintéloc Racing	2:38.825	10	**2:20.323**	8	+1.216	8
9	17	(France) Evan Giltaire	ART Grand Prix	2:41.355	16	**2:20.677**	9	+1.570	9
10	26	(Italy) Matteo De Palo	PHM Racing	2.37:593	6	**2:20.813**	10	+1.706	10
11	16	(Australia) James Wharton	ART Grand Prix	2:41.253	15	**2:20.842**	11	+1.735	14^{1}
12	25	(United Arab Emirates) Rashid Al Dhaheri	PHM Racing	2:37.521	4	**2:21.320**	12	+2.213	11
13	20	(Japan) Jin Nakamura	TOM'S Formula	2:42.911	19	**2:21.692**	13	+2.585	12
14	3	(Italy) Mattia Colnaghi	MP Motorsport	2:43.341	20	**2:21.996**	14	+2.889	13
15	30	(Sweden) Dino Beganovic	SJM Theodore Prema Racing	2:38.211	9	**2:22.199**	15	+3.092	15
16	2	(Italy) Valerio Rinicella	MP Motorsport	2:35.234	3	**2:22.291**	16	+3.184	16
17	15	(Kazakhstan) Alexander Abkhazava	Saintéloc Racing	2:42.799	18	**2:22.329**	17	+3.222	17
18	32	(Republic of Ireland) Alex Dunne	SJM Theodore Prema Racing	2.37:985	7	**2:22.797**	18	+3.690	18
19	53	(Japan) Sota Ogawa	TGM Grand Prix	2:47.193	22	**2:23.508**	19	+4.401	19
20	6	(Finland) Tuukka Taponen	R-ace GP	2:32.684	2	**2:23.720**	20	+4.613	20
21	33	(Macau) Tiago Rodrigues	Evans GP	—	27	**2:23.951**	21	+4.844	21
22	27	(China) Ruiqi Liu	PHM Racing	—	24	**2:24.601**	22	+5.494	22
23	19	(Japan) Rikuto Kobayashi	TOM'S Formula	2:50.798	23	**2:24.631**	23	+5.524	23
24	21	(United States) Jett Bowling	Kiwi Motorsport	—	25	**2:24.985**	24	+5.878	24
25	55	(Japan) Rintaro Sato	TGM Grand Prix	2:46.250	21	**2:25.774**	25	+6.667	25
26	88	(United Kingdom) Kai Daryanani	Evans GP	—	26	**2:26.893**	26	+7.786	26
27	18	(Japan) Kanato Le	ART Grand Prix	**2:41.771**	17	3:02.370	27	+22.664	27
Sources:

- **^1** – James Wharton was handed a three-place grid penalty after colliding with Jin Nakamura in the second qualifying session.
- **^2** – Mari Boya stalled at the start of the formation lap. He started the race from the pitlane, and his grid spot was left vacant.

== Qualifying race ==
2024 Macau Grand Prix
- Qualifying Race

Race details
- Date: 16 November 2024
- Distance: 10 laps, 61.20 km (38.03 mi)
- Weather: Mixed conditions

Pole position
Driver	(United States) Ugo Ugochukwu	R-ace GP
- Time: 2:19.107

Fastest lap
Driver	(Germany) Oliver Goethe	MP Motorsport
- Time: 2:21.520 on lap 4

Podium
First	(United States) Ugo Ugochukwu	R-ace GP
Second	(Germany) Oliver Goethe	MP Motorsport
Third	(Mexico) Noel León	KCMG IXO by Pinnacle Motorsport

The 10-lap qualifying race to set the main race's starting order commenced at 15.55 Macau Standard Time (UTC+08:00) on 16 November. Conditions at the start were cloudy, but dry, with the air temperature at 27 °C (80 °F). Drivers reported drops of rain on their reconnaissance laps, but all fitted slick tires. Boya stalled during the formation lap and, after attempting to regain his original grid position by overtaking multiple competitors, was forced to start from the pit lane. At the start, Goethe drew alongside Ugochukwu, while Ogawa and Taponen ran wide at Mandarin Bend and collided with the outside barrier. Ugochukwu maintained his lead into the first braking zone at Lisboa before the safety car was deployed to clear the damaged vehicles.

With eight laps remaining, the safety car withdrew, allowing Ugochukwu to make a strong restart and pull away from Goethe, while Boya was disqualified for his overtaking during the formation lap. Ugochukwu extended his lead to 1.3 seconds over Goethe during the restart, as Naël overtook Webster for sixth place. On lap five, Goethe set the fastest lap, closing to within 0.7 seconds of Ugochukwu. Slater overtook Deligny at the beginning of lap six, and Webster misjudged his braking at Lisboa, making contact with Naël and sending him into the runoff area. A second safety car was deployed following the retirement of MP's Mattia Colnaghi, and a red flag soon followed due to rainfall.

After a 15-minute break, the drivers returned to the track on mandated wet-weather tires, led by the safety car, with three laps remaining. Most of the circuit was dry, except for the heavily soaked braking zone at Lisboa corner. Race Control determined the conditions too hazardous for racing, leading to two additional laps under the safety car before the race concluded with the chequered flag. Ugochukwu, unchallenged, secured victory ahead of Goethe, with Léon, Slater, and Deligny completing the top five. Webster was penalized for hitting Naël, so De Palo, Wharton, Dhaheri, Giltaire and Beganovic rounded out the top ten.

Final qualifying race classification
Pos	No.	Driver	Team	Laps	Time/Retired	Grid
1	4	(United States) Ugo Ugochukwu	R-ace GP	10	47:40.192	1
2	1	(Germany) Oliver Goethe	MP Motorsport	10	+0.221	2
3	7	(Mexico) Noel León	KCMG IXO by Pinnacle Motorsport	10	+0.445	3
4	31	(United Kingdom) Freddie Slater	SJM Theodore Prema Racing	10	+0.663	7
5	5	(France) Enzo Deligny	R-ace GP	10	+1.137	4
6	26	(Italy) Matteo De Palo	PHM Racing	10	+2.196	10
7	16	(Australia) James Wharton	ART Grand Prix	10	+2.581	14
8	25	(United Arab Emirates) Rashid Al Dhaheri	PHM Racing	10	+2.792	11
9	17	(France) Evan Giltaire	ART Grand Prix	10	+3.051	9
10	30	(Sweden) Dino Beganovic	SJM Theodore Prema Racing	10	+3.319	15
11	14	(France) Théophile Naël	Saintéloc Racing	10	+4.034	8
12	32	(Republic of Ireland) Alex Dunne	SJM Theodore Prema Racing	10	+4.309	18
13	20	(Japan) Jin Nakamura	TOM'S Formula	10	+6.214	12
14	2	(Italy) Valerio Rinicella	MP Motorsport	10	+6.460	16
15	37	(Australia) Cooper Webster	Evans GP	10	+6.586	6
16	55	(Japan) Rintaro Sato	TGM Grand Prix	10	+6.664	25
17	33	(Macau) Tiago Rodrigues	Evans GP	10	+6.924	21
18	21	(United States) Jett Bowling	Kiwi Motorsport	10	+7.248	24
19	18	(Japan) Kanato Le	ART Grand Prix	10	+7.426	27
20	88	(United Kingdom) Kai Daryanani	Evans GP	10	+7.702	26
21	19	(Japan) Rikuto Kobayashi	TOM'S Formula	10	+9.869	23
22	27	(China) Ruiqi Liu	PHM Racing	10	+9.948	22
23	15	(Kazakhstan) Alexander Abkhazava	Saintéloc Racing	10	+10.242	17
Ret	3	(Italy) Mattia Colnaghi	MP Motorsport	5	Accident	13
Ret	53	(Japan) Sota Ogawa	TGM Grand Prix	0	Accident	19
Ret	6	(Finland) Tuukka Taponen	R-ace GP	0	Accident	20
DSQ	8	(Spain) Mari Boya	KCMG IXO by Pinnacle Motorsport	4	Disqualified	5
Fastest Lap: Oliver Goethe, 2:21.520, 96.7 mph (155.6 km/h), on lap 4

== Main race ==
The 15-lap race began at 15:30 local time (UTC+08:00) on 19 November under clear and dry conditions, with an air temperature of 26 °C (79 °F). Due to wet patches on the track from earlier rain, Race Control ordered a safety car start. After one lap, the safety car withdrew, allowing a rolling start. Ugochukwu seized the opportunity to lead over Goethe before a major incident at the Lisboa corner. Wharton, attempting an outside pass on Deligny and De Palo, hit the outer barrier, causing Deligny to collide with Wharton's stationary car and continue moving. Rodrigues, Bowling, Le, and Daryanani were also caught in the ensuing pile-up, while Kobayashi managed to reverse and continue. Sato, who made contact while avoiding the crash, retired later that lap as the race was red-flagged.

Following a 22-minute pause, the race resumed behind the safety car with 12 laps remaining. Once the safety car exited, Ugochukwu pulled ahead of Goethe, who was defending from León. Beganovic dropped three positions at Lisboa, exiting the top ten. The safety car was deployed again when Ruiqi crashed at Police corner before another lap was completed. With eight laps left, Ugochukwu maintained his lead at the restart and widened the gap over Goethe. The order at the front remained steady, with Ugochukwu holding a 1.6-second advantage by lap eight. Rinicella brushed the wall at Fishermen's Bend but kept racing, while Ogawa struck the wall on the main straight and stopped, prompting another safety car. Naël pitted to repair his car, losing positions.

With two laps remaining, the field was released again. Nakamura, caught out by Ugochukwu's delayed acceleration, collided with another car and retired with damage. Goethe stayed close but could not mount a challenge. Ugochukwu built a 1-second lead by the final lap as Colnaghi hit the wall at Fishermen's. On the last run to Lisboa, Slater attempted to overtake León for third but braked too late and crashed. Yellow flags waved when Ugochukwu entered the final sector, allowing him to win the Macau Grand Prix without further challenge from behind.

De Palo, Al Dhaheri and Naël were all disqualified after the race, with the former two failing the post-race technical checks and Naël judged to have received outside assistance after he stalled when he made a pit stop during the race.

Final race classification
Pos	No.	Driver	Team	Laps	Time/Retired	Grid
1	4	(United States) Ugo Ugochukwu	R-ace GP	15	1:06:58.505	1
2	1	(Germany) Oliver Goethe	MP Motorsport	15	+0.412	2
3	7	(Mexico) Noel León	KCMG IXO by Pinnacle Motorsport	15	+2.426	3
4	5	(France) Enzo Deligny	R-ace GP	15	+2.893	5
5	37	(Australia) Cooper Webster	Evans GP	15	+6.877	15
6	32	(Republic of Ireland) Alex Dunne	SJM Theodore Prema Racing	15	+7.360	13
7	8	(Spain) Mari Boya	KCMG IXO by Pinnacle Motorsport	15	+8.006	27
8	30	(Sweden) Dino Beganovic	SJM Theodore Prema Racing	15	+8.589	10
9	15	(Kazakhstan) Alexander Abkhazava	Saintéloc Racing	15	+9.660	23
10	6	(Finland) Tuukka Taponen	R-ace GP	15	+9.914	26
11	2	(Italy) Valerio Rinicella	MP Motorsport	15	+10.697	14
12	19	(Japan) Rikuto Kobayashi	TOM'S Formula	15	+24.901	21
13†	31	(United Kingdom) Freddie Slater	SJM Theodore Prema Racing	14	+ 1 lap	4
14†	3	(Italy) Mattia Colnaghi	MP Motorsport	13	+ 2 laps	24
Ret	20	(Japan) Jin Nakamura	TOM'S Formula	12	Accident	12
Ret	53	(Japan) Sota Ogawa	TGM Grand Prix	10	Accident	25
Ret	27	(China) Ruiqi Liu	PHM Racing	3	Accident	22
Ret	16	(Australia) James Wharton	ART Grand Prix	1	Accident	7
Ret	17	(France) Evan Giltaire	ART Grand Prix	1	Accident	9
Ret	55	(Japan) Rintaro Sato	TGM Grand Prix	1	Accident damage	16
Ret	33	(Macau) Tiago Rodrigues	Evans GP	1	Accident	17
Ret	21	(United States) Jett Bowling	Kiwi Motorsport	1	Accident	18
Ret	18	(Japan) Kanato Le	ART Grand Prix	1	Accident	19
Ret	88	(United Kingdom) Kai Daryanani	Evans GP	1	Accident	20
DSQ	26	(Italy) Matteo De Palo	PHM Racing	15	Disqualified	6
DSQ	25	(United Arab Emirates) Rashid Al Dhaheri	PHM Racing	15	Disqualified	8
DSQ	14	(France) Théophile Naël	Saintéloc Racing	15	Disqualified	11
Fastest Lap: Oliver Goethe, 2:19.599, 98.1 mph (157.8 km/h), on lap 10
Sources:

- † – Driver did not finish the race, but was still classified as they completed more than 85% of the race distance.

== See also ==
- 2024 FIA GT World Cup
- 2024 Macau Guia Race
