= Matteo De Palo =

Italian racing driver (born 2007)

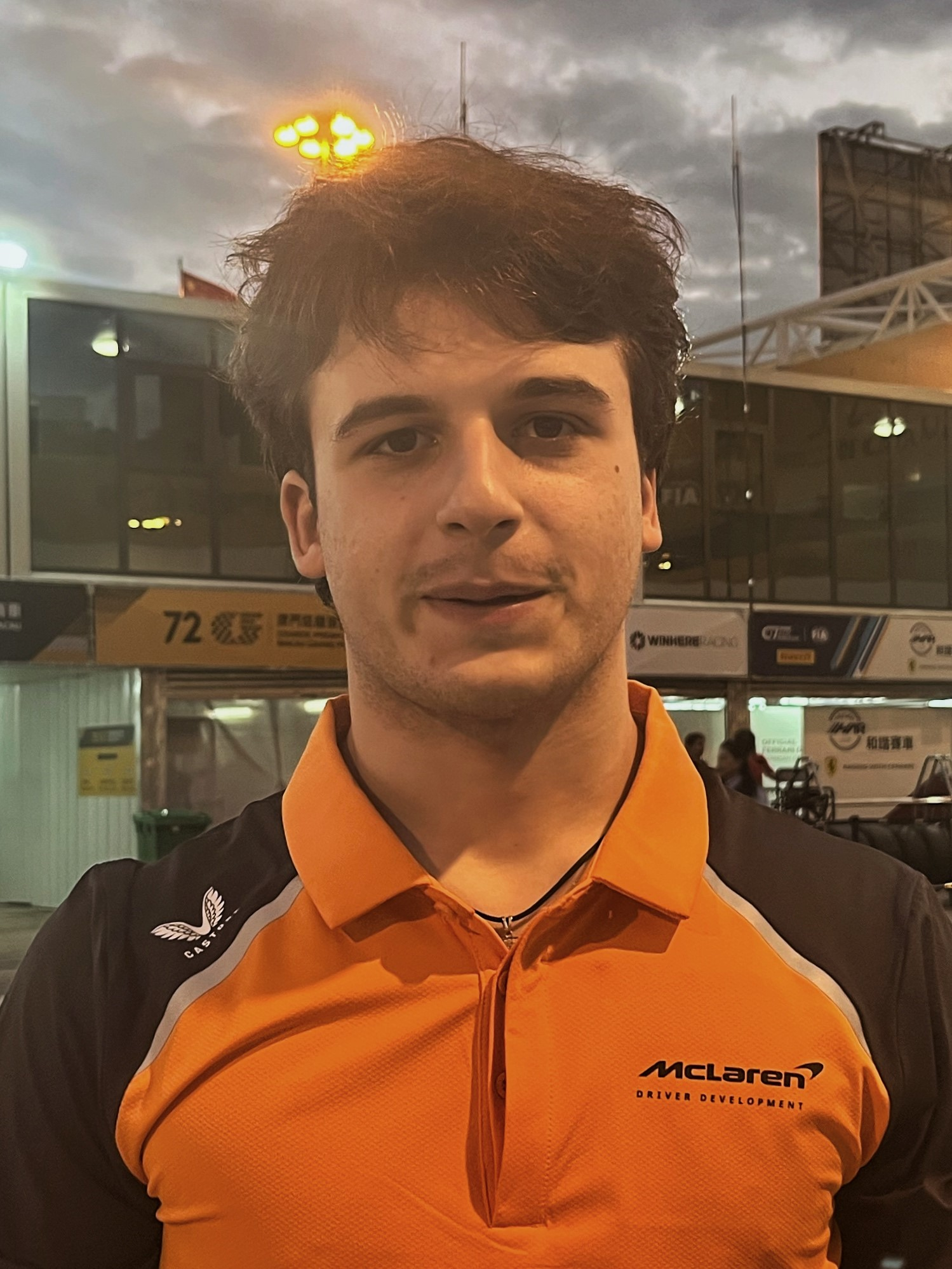
- De Palo at the 2025 Macau Grand Prix
- Nationality: (Italy) Italian
- Born: 8 November 2007 (age 19) Rome, Italy

FIA Formula 3 Championship career
- Debut season: 2026
- Current team: MP Motorsport
- Categorisation: FIA Silver
- Car number: TBA
- Former teams: Trident
- Starts: 19
- Wins: 0
- Podiums: 0
- Poles: 0
- Fastest laps: 1
- Best finish: 24th in 2026

Previous series
- 2024–2025; 2024–2025; 2023; 2023; 2023; 2023: FR European; FR Middle East; F4 British; F4 Spanish; Italian F4; Formula Winter Series
- Statistics up to date as of 19 October 2026.

Matteo De Palo (born 8 November 2007) is an Italian racing driver who is set to compete in the FIA Formula 3 Championship for MP Motorsport as part of the McLaren Driver Development Programme.

De Palo was the runner-up in the 2025 Formula Regional European Championship for Trident. He previously competed in the 2023 F4 Spanish Championship with Campos Racing, finishing fifth overall, and the 2024 Formula Regional European Championship with Saintéloc Racing.

== Career ==
=== Formula Winter Series ===
De Palo made his car racing debut at the second round in Circuit Ricardo Tormo during the 2023 Formula Winter Series. He won the first race on debut, while taking both poles for the round.

In July 2022, De Palo took part in a scouting camp conducted by the Ferrari Driver Academy.

=== Formula 4 ===
==== Spanish F4 ====
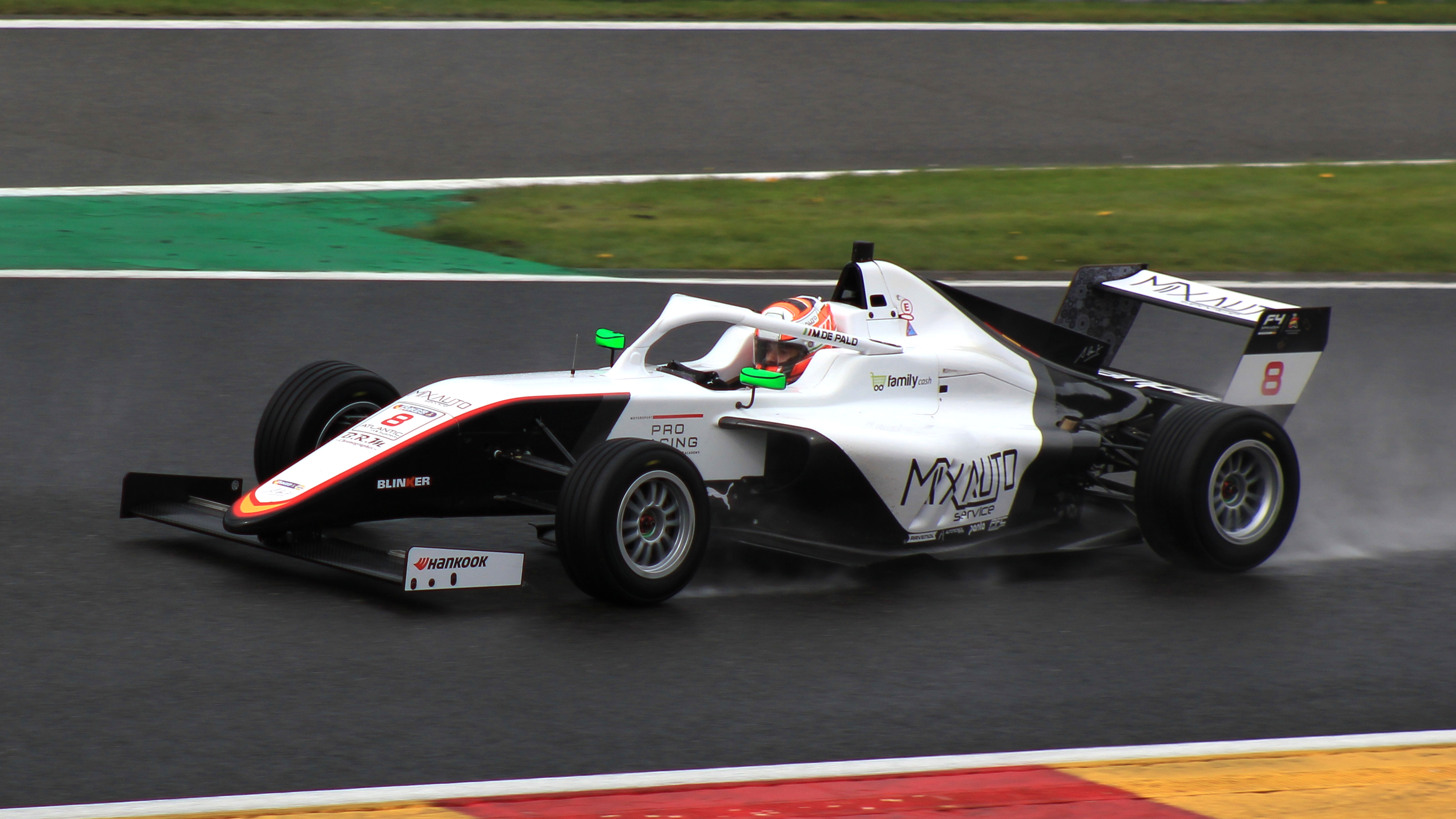
De Palo racing at Spa-Francorchamps during the 2023 F4 Spanish Championship.

De Palo joined Campos Racing for the 2023 F4 Spanish Championship. He took his only Spanish F4 win of the year during the first round in Spa-Francorchamps, after original winner Valerio Rinicella received a penalty for track limits. A further podium came the next round in Aragón where he finished third from pole. He would next stand on the podium during the penultimate round at Circuit Ricardo Tormo, scoring a double podium. Despite only four podiums, his consistent points scoring saw him fifth in the standings, with 171 points.

==== Italian F4 ====
De Palo took part in the opening round of the 2023 Italian F4 Championship with R-ace GP at Imola. With ten points, he was ranked 20th in the standings.

==== British F4 ====
De Palo made a cameo appearance in two rounds during the 2023 F4 British Championship, where he drove for Phinsys by Argenti.

=== Formula Regional ===
==== 2024 ====
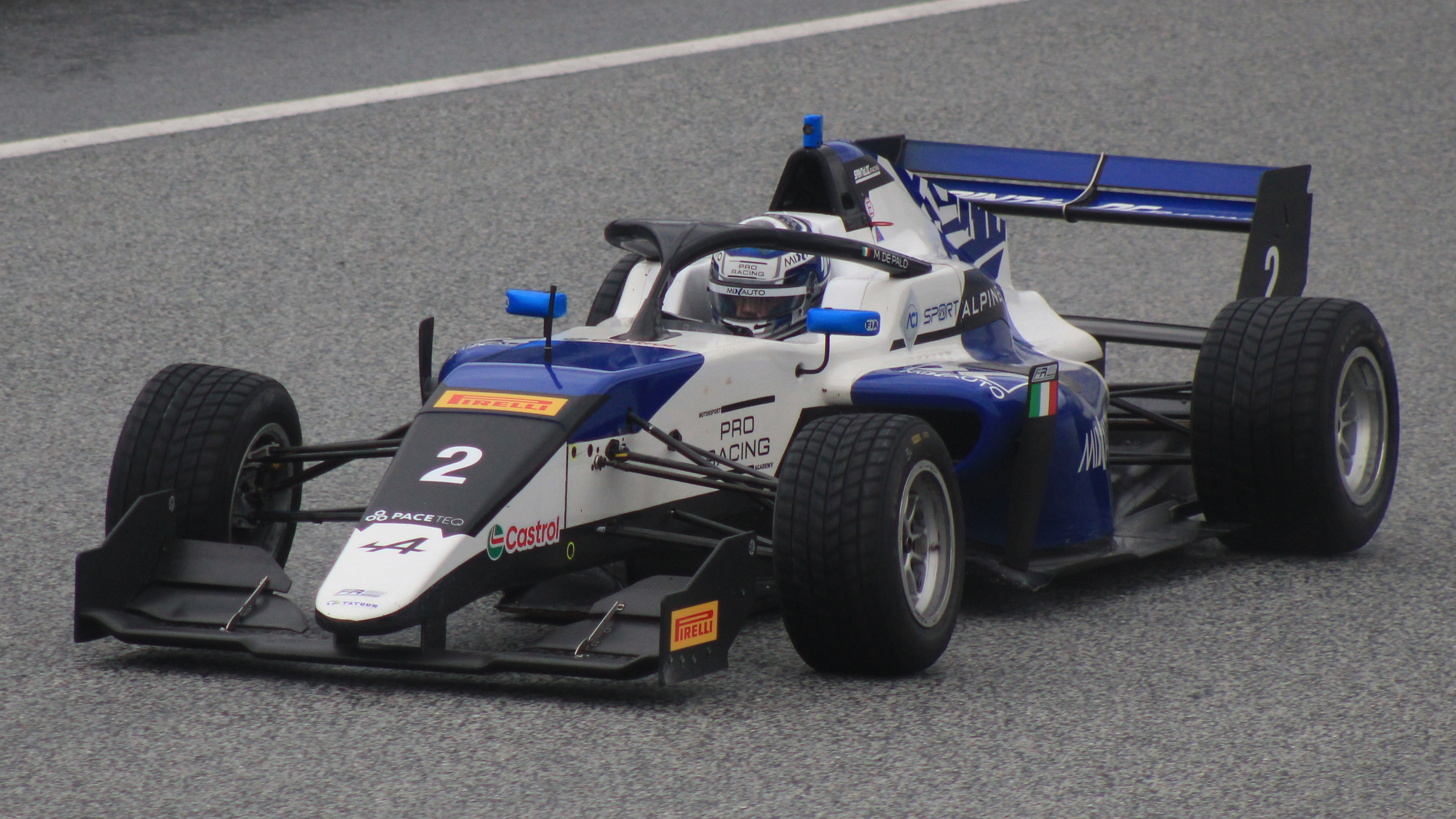
De Palo racing at the Red Bull Ring during the 2024 Formula Regional European Championship

For 2024, De Palo was promoted to the Formula Regional European Championship with Saintéloc Racing. In the pre-season, he partook in the first two rounds of the Formula Regional Middle East Championship with the team. He scored two points finishes with the highest being a seventh, putting him 18th in the standings. In his main campaign, De Palo scored his first points with fifth in the second round in Spa-Francorchamps. He improved his personal best to fourth during the second race at the Red Bull Ring. With six points finishes, De Palo finished 17th in the drivers' standings with 29 points.

De Palo also took part in the Macau Grand Prix with PHM Racing. In an incident-packed race, De Palo managed to find his way to finish in fifth place, but was disqualified due to a car infringement.

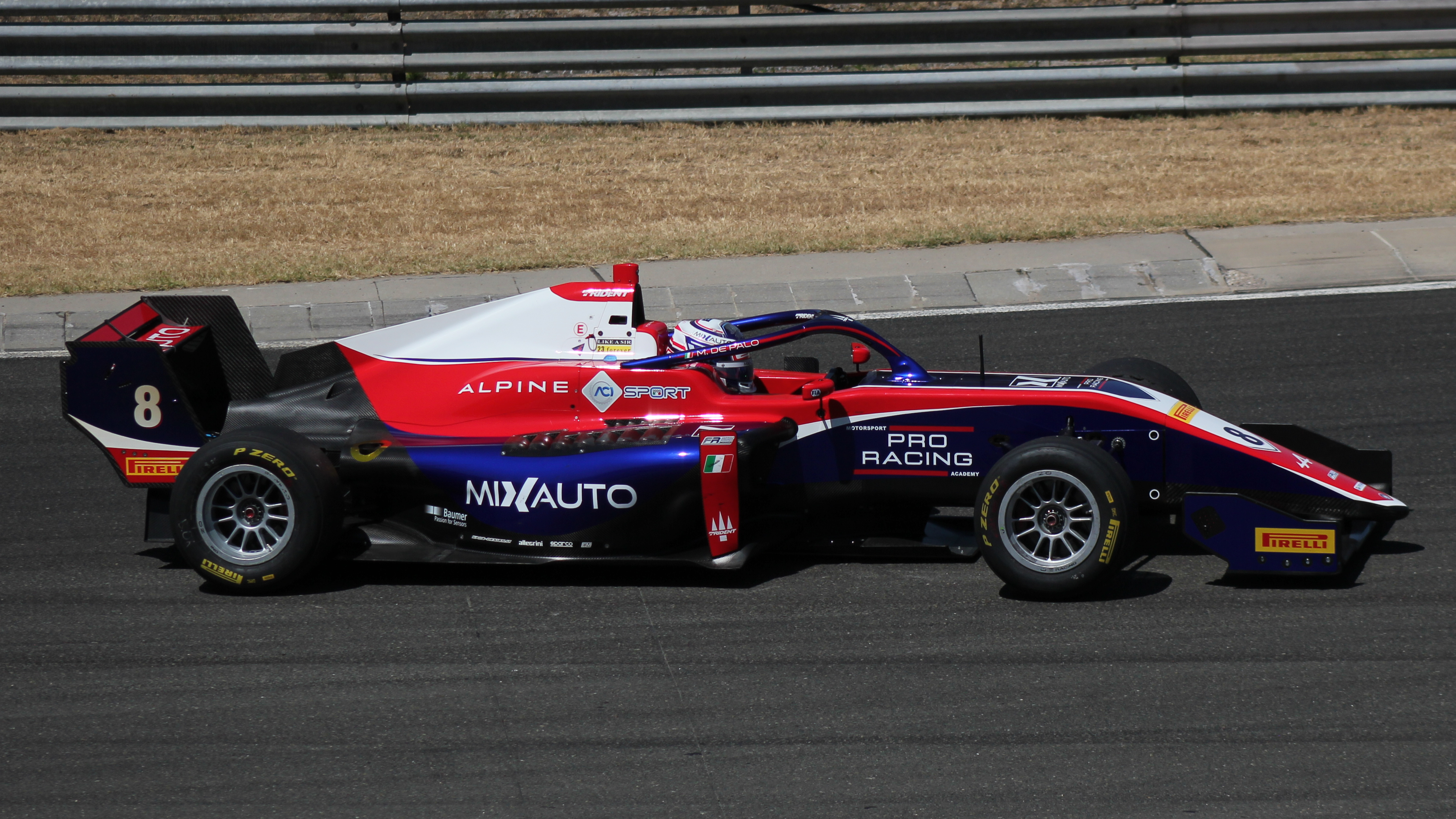
De Palo driving for Trident during the 2025 Formula Regional European Championship

==== 2025 ====
For the final two rounds of the Formula Regional Middle East campaign, De Palo joined the grid with Evans GP. He score points on one occasion, with ninth place during the final round in Qatar, placing 19th in the standings.

De Palo remained in Formula Regional Europe for 2025, switching over to Trident for his sophomore campaign. He won the first race of the season at the Misano World Circuit, a maiden win in the series for both him and Trident. He followed this result with a podium in race two, putting him second in the overall standings behind Evan Giltaire. He seized the championship lead next time out in Spa-Francorchamps with a second place. However, he only managed a double sixth place finish in Zandvoort that saw him concede the lead to Freddie Slater. Despite this, he took his first pole at the Hungaroring, and followed it up with a second win of the campaign to take back the points lead. Despite a second place in Paul Ricard, a double victory from Slater swung favours back to the Briton. After being off the rostrum in Imola, De Palo won during the first race in Austria and regained the championship lead, but this was immediately lost with a retirement in race two. He secured his fourth and final victory of the year in Barcelona, and a double rostrum in Hockenheim to sit four points behind Slater into the title decider. However, his title chances derailed during the first Monza race, as an on-track incident necessitated a pit stop, and he finished outside the points. Despite this, he rounded the season with a second place the next day, finishing runner-up in the standings with four wins, two poles and eleven podiums.

Later in the year, De Palo raced in the Macau Grand Prix with R-ace GP.

==== 2026 ====
At the end of November, De Palo joined CL Motorsport to compete in the Macau Grand Prix.

=== FIA Formula 3 ===
==== 2026 ====
De Palo made the promotion to Formula 3 for 2026, continuing with Trident alongside his FRECA rival Freddie Slater.

==== 2027 ====
In 2027, De Palo will switch to MP Motorsport for his second Formula 3 season.

=== Formula One ===
In November 2025, De Palo became a part of the McLaren Driver Development Programme.

== Karting record ==
=== Karting career summary ===
Season	Series	Team	Position
2016	WSK Champions Cup — 60 Mini		NC
2017	WSK Super Master Series — 60 Mini		32nd
2017	46° Trofeo Delle Industrie — 60 Mini	Energy Corse	10th
2017	WSK Champions Cup — 60 Mini		8th
2017	WSK Final Cup — 60 Mini		12th
2017	ROK Cup International Final — Mini ROK	ASD Giugliano Kart	25th
2018	Andrea Margutti Trophy — 60 Mini		NC
2018	Italian Championship — 60 Mini		14th
2018	ROK Cup International Final — Mini ROK		26th
2019	24° South Garda Winter Cup — Mini ROK	AV Racing	4th
2019	WSK Super Master Series — 60 Mini	AV Racing	28th
2019	WSK Champions Cup — 60 Mini	AV Racing	NC
2019	WSK Euro Series — 60 Mini	AV Racing	NC
2019	ROK Cup Superfinal — Junior ROK	KGT Motorsport	4th
2019	48° Trofeo delle Industrie — OKJ	KGT Motorsport	16th
2019	WSK Open Cup — OKJ	KGT Motorsport	53rd
2019	WSK Final Cup — OKJ	KGT Motorsport	33rd
2020	WSK Champions Cup — OKJ	KGT Motorsport	15th
2020	WSK Super Master Series — OKJ	KGT Motorsport	NC
2020	25° South Garda Winter Cup — OKJ	KGT Motorsport	10th
2020	CIK-FIA Karting Academy Trophy		5th
2020	WSK Euro Series — OKJ	Ward Racing	51st
2020	Andrea Margutti Trophy — X30 Junior	Mixauto Motorsport	8th
2021	WSK Champions Cup — OKJ	KR Motorsport	24th
2021	WSK Super Master Series — OKJ		14th
2021	WSK Open Cup — OK		31st
2021	Champions of the Future — OKJ		31st
2021	FIA Karting European Championship — Junior		30th
2022	Champions of the Future Winter Series — OK	Kart Republic Motorsport	15th
2022	FIA Karting European Championship — OK	Kart Republic Motorsport	42nd

== Racing record ==
=== Racing career summary ===
Season	Series	Team	Races	Wins	Poles	F/Laps	Podiums	Points	Position
2023	Formula Winter Series	Campos Racing	2	1	2	0	2	37	6th
2023	F4 Spanish Championship	Campos Racing	21	1	1	1	4	171	5th
2023	Italian F4 Championship	R-ace GP	3	0	0	0	0	10	20th
2023	F4 British Championship	Phinsys by Argenti	5	0	0	0	0	0	25th
2024	Formula Regional Middle East Championship	Saintéloc Racing	6	0	0	0	0	8	18th
2024	Formula Regional European Championship	Saintéloc Racing	20	0	0	0	0	29	17th
2024	Macau Grand Prix	PHM Racing	1	0	0	0	0	—N/a	DSQ
2025	Formula Regional Middle East Championship	Evans GP	6	0	0	0	0	4	19th
2025	Formula Regional European Championship	Trident	20	4	3	3	11	277	**2nd**
2025	Macau Grand Prix	R-ace GP	1	0	0	0	0	—N/a	8th
2026	FIA Formula 3 Championship	Trident	19	0	0	1	0	7	24th
2026	Macau Grand Prix	CL Motorsport	0	0	0	0	0	—N/a	TBD
2027	FIA Formula 3 Championship	MP Motorsport	0	0	0	0	0	0	TBD

* Season still in progress.

=== Complete Formula Winter Series results ===
(key) (Races in bold indicate pole position; races in italics indicate fastest lap)

Year	Team	1	2	3	4	5	6	7	8	DC	Points
2023	Campos Racing	JER; 1	JER; 2	**CRT**; **1**; 1	**CRT**; **2**; 5	NAV; 1	NAV; 2	CAT; 2	CAT; 2	6th	37

=== Complete F4 Spanish Championship results ===
(key) (Races in bold indicate pole position) (Races in italics indicate fastest lap)

Year	Team	1	2	3	4	5	6	7	8	9	10	11	12	13	14	15	16	17	18	19	20	21	DC	Points
2023	Campos Racing	SPA; 1; 9	SPA; 2; 7	SPA; 3; 1	ARA; 1; 7	ARA; 2; 5	**ARA**; **3**; 3	NAV; 1; 15	NAV; 2 Ret	NAV; 3; 6	JER; 1; 4	JER; 2; 7	JER; 3; 8	EST; 1; 7	EST; 2; 4	EST; 3; 9	CRT; 1; 7	CRT; 2; 3	CRT; 3; 2	CAT; 1; 6	CAT; 2; 6	CAT; 3; 4	5th	171

=== Complete Italian F4 Championship results ===
(key) (Races in bold indicate pole position) (Races in italics indicate fastest lap)

Year	Team	1	2	3	4	5	6	7	8	9	10	11	12	13	14	15	16	17	18	19	20	21	22	DC	Points
2023	R-ace GP	IMO; 1; 24†	IMO; 2	IMO; 3; 7	IMO; 4; 8	MIS; 1	MIS; 2	MIS; 3	SPA; 1	SPA; 2	SPA; 3	MNZ; 1	MNZ; 2	MNZ; 3	LEC; 1	LEC; 2	LEC; 3	MUG; 1	MUG; 2	MUG; 3	VLL; 1	VLL; 2	VLL; 3	20th	10

=== Complete F4 British Championship results ===
(key) (Races in bold indicate pole position) (Races in italics indicate fastest lap)

Year	Team	1	2	3	4	5	6	7	8	9	10	11	12	13	14	15	16	17	18	19	20	21	22	23	24	25	26	27	28	29	30	31	DC	Points
2023	Phinsys by Argenti	DON; 1	DON; 2	DON; 3	BHI; 1	BHI; 2	BHI; 3	SNE; 1 C	SNE; 2; 11	SNE; 3; 19	THR; 1; 13	THR; 2; 19	THR; 3; 12	OUL; 1	OUL; 2	OUL; 3	SIL; 1	SIL; 2	SIL; 3	CRO; 1	CRO; 2	CRO; 3	KNO; 1	KNO; 2	KNO; 3	DPGP; 1	DPGP; 2	DPGP; 3	DPGP; 4	BHGP; 1	BHGP; 2	BHGP; 3	25th	0

=== Complete Formula Regional Middle East Championship results ===
(key) (Races in bold indicate pole position) (Races in italics indicate fastest lap)

Year	Entrant	1	2	3	4	5	6	7	8	9	10	11	12	13	14	15	DC	Points
2024	Saintéloc Racing	YMC1; 1; 15	YMC1; 2; 14	YMC1; 3; 9	YMC2; 1; 7	YMC2; 2; 16	YMC2; 3; 15	DUB1; 1	DUB1; 2	DUB1; 3	YMC3; 1	YMC3; 2	YMC3; 3	DUB2; 1	DUB2; 2	DUB2; 3	18th	8
2025	Evans GP	YMC1; 1	YMC1; 2	YMC1; 3	YMC2; 1	YMC2; 2	YMC2; 3	DUB; 1	DUB; 2	DUB; 3	YMC3; 1 Ret	YMC3; 2; 16	YMC3; 3; 24†	LUS; 1 Ret	LUS; 2; 9	LUS; 3; 19	19th	4

=== Complete Formula Regional European Championship results ===
(key) (Races in bold indicate pole position) (Races in italics indicate fastest lap)

Year	Team	1	2	3	4	5	6	7	8	9	10	11	12	13	14	15	16	17	18	19	20	DC	Points
2024	Saintéloc Racing	HOC; 1; 15	HOC; 2; 13	SPA; 1; 5	SPA; 2; 11	ZAN; 1 Ret	ZAN; 2 Ret	HUN; 1 DSQ	HUN; 2; 10	MUG; 1; 19	MUG; 2; 18	LEC; 1; 10	LEC; 2; 15	IMO; 1; 8	IMO; 2 Ret	RBR; 1; 10	RBR; 2; 4	CAT; 1; 22	CAT; 2 Ret	MNZ; 1; 25†	MNZ; 2 Ret	17th	29
2025	Trident	MIS; 1; 1	MIS; 2; 3	SPA; 1; 2	SPA; 2; 6	ZAN; 1; 6	ZAN; 2; 6	**HUN**; **1**; 1	HUN; 2; 3	LEC; 1; 2	LEC; 2; 6	IMO; 1; 5	IMO; 2; 4	**RBR**; **1**; 1	RBR; 2 Ret	CAT; 1; 1	CAT; 2; 7	**HOC**; **1**; 3	HOC; 2; 2	MNZ; 1; 11	MNZ; 2; 2	2nd	277

=== Complete Macau Grand Prix results ===
Year	Team	Car	Qualifying	Quali Race	Main Race
2024	(Germany) PHM Racing	Tatuus F3 T-318	10th	6th	DSQ
2025	(France) R-ace GP	Tatuus F3 T-318	9th	11th	8th
2026	(Italy) CL Motorsport	Tatuus T-326	TBD	TBD	TBD

=== Complete FIA Formula 3 Championship results ===
(key) (Races in bold indicate pole position) (Races in italics indicate fastest lap)

Year	Entrant	1	2	3	4	5	6	7	8	9	10	11	12	13	14	15	16	17	18	19	20	DC	Points
2026	Trident	MEL; SPR; 26	MEL; FEA; 23	MON; SPR; 14	MON; FEA; 25	CAT; SPR; 25	CAT; FEA; 20	RBR; SPR; 18	RBR; FEA; 14	SIL; SPR; 4	SIL; FEA; DSQ	SPA; SPR; 28	SPA; FEA; Ret	HUN; SPR; 27	HUN; FEA; 21	MNZ; SPR; 20	MNZ; FEA; 16	MAD; SPR; 12	MAD; FEA1; 14	MAD; FEA2; 18		24th	7
2027	MP Motorsport	BHR; SPR	BHR; FEA	JED; SPR	JED; FEA	MEL; SPR	MEL; FEA	MTL; SPR	MTL; FEA	MON; SPR	MON; FEA	SIL; SPR	SIL; FEA	RBR; SPR	RBR; FEA	MNZ; SPR	MNZ; FEA	MAD; SPR	MAD; FEA	IST; SPR	IST; FEA	TBD	TBD
