= 2025 Lamborghini Super Trofeo Asia =

International motor racing series

The 2025 Lamborghini Super Trofeo Asia was the twelfth season of the Lamborghini Super Trofeo Asia. The season began on April 4 at Sydney Motorsport Park and concluded on November 7 with the World Final at the Misano World Circuit.

The Pro class championship was won by the duo of Hon Chio Leong and Alex Denning. Kai Shun Liu and Qikuan Cao won the Pro-Am class, Suttiluck Buncharoen won the Am division and Supachai Weeraborwornpong successfully defended his title in the Lamborghini Cup. SJM Theodore Racing were crowned teams champions.

== Calendar ==
The calendar for the 2025 season was released on 13 October 2024, featuring six rounds. The location of the 12th Lamborghini Super Trofeo World Finals was revealed on 16 November 2024, as Lamborghini announced that they were holding the World Finals at Misano on 8–9 November, serving as the final races for the European, Asian and North American series.

Rnd.	Circuit	Date	Supporting
1	Sydney Motorsport Park, Eastern Creek, Australia	4–6 April	Standalone event
2	Shanghai International Circuit, Shanghai, China	16–18 May	China GT Championship; F4 Chinese Championship
3	Fuji Speedway, Oyama, Japan	27–29 June	Formula Regional Japanese Championship
4	Inje Speedium, Inje County, South Korea	18–20 July	Inje International Motor Festival
5	Sepang International Circuit, Selangor, Malaysia	5–7 September	Formula 4 South East Asia Championship
6	Misano World Circuit Marco Simoncelli, Misano Adriatico, Italy	6–7 November	Lamborghini Super Trofeo World Finals
WF	Misano World Circuit Marco Simoncelli, Misano Adriatico, Italy	8–9 November	Lamborghini Super Trofeo World Finals

== Entry list ==
All teams use the Lamborghini Huracán Super Trofeo Evo2.

Team	No.	Drivers	Class	Rounds
(China) LK Motorsport by Climax Racing (China) Climax Racing	3	(Hong Kong) Kai Shun Liu	PA	All
(China) LK Motorsport by Climax Racing (China) Climax Racing	3	(China) Qikuan Cao	PA	All
(China) LK Motorsport by Climax Racing (China) Climax Racing	39	(China) Kuisheng Huang	Am	2
(China) LK Motorsport by Climax Racing (China) Climax Racing	39	(China) Huilian Han	Am	2
(China) LK Motorsport by Climax Racing (China) Climax Racing	66	(Macau) Zhiwei Lu	PA	All
(China) LK Motorsport by Climax Racing (China) Climax Racing	66	(China) Ling Kang	PA	All
(China) LK Motorsport by Climax Racing (China) Climax Racing	67	(China) Kuisheng Huang	P	1
(China) LK Motorsport by Climax Racing (China) Climax Racing	67	(China) Yujia Gao	P	1
(China) LK Motorsport by Climax Racing (China) Climax Racing	67	(Macau) Liangbo Yao	Am	3–4
(China) LK Motorsport by Climax Racing (China) Climax Racing	67	(China) Yaqi Zhang	Am	3–4
(China) LK Motorsport by Climax Racing (China) Climax Racing	76	(China) Dongsheng Li	Am	All
(China) LK Motorsport by Climax Racing (China) Climax Racing	76	(China) Donghui Li	Am	All
(China) LK Motorsport by Climax Racing (China) Climax Racing	99	(China) Zhou Bihuang	PA	5–6
(China) LK Motorsport by Climax Racing (China) Climax Racing	99	(Australia) Bryce Fullwood	PA	5
(China) LK Motorsport by Climax Racing (China) Climax Racing	99	(Australia) Damien Hamilton	PA	6
(Malaysia) HZO Fortis Racing Team by Absolute Racing (Hong Kong) Absolute Racing (Indonesia) Delta Garage Racing Team by Absolute Racing	4	(Malaysia) Harith Zairel Oh	Am	5
(Malaysia) HZO Fortis Racing Team by Absolute Racing (Hong Kong) Absolute Racing (Indonesia) Delta Garage Racing Team by Absolute Racing	4	(Malaysia) Aaron Lim	Am	5
(Malaysia) HZO Fortis Racing Team by Absolute Racing (Hong Kong) Absolute Racing (Indonesia) Delta Garage Racing Team by Absolute Racing	5	(Malaysia) Haziq Zairel Oh	Am	All
(Malaysia) HZO Fortis Racing Team by Absolute Racing (Hong Kong) Absolute Racing (Indonesia) Delta Garage Racing Team by Absolute Racing	5	(Malaysia) Hairie Zairel Oh	Am	All
(Malaysia) HZO Fortis Racing Team by Absolute Racing (Hong Kong) Absolute Racing (Indonesia) Delta Garage Racing Team by Absolute Racing	37	(Italy) Vincenzo Ricci	Am	3
(Malaysia) HZO Fortis Racing Team by Absolute Racing (Hong Kong) Absolute Racing (Indonesia) Delta Garage Racing Team by Absolute Racing	37	(China) Du Tian Hao	Am	3
(Malaysia) HZO Fortis Racing Team by Absolute Racing (Hong Kong) Absolute Racing (Indonesia) Delta Garage Racing Team by Absolute Racing	86	(Indonesia) Umar Abdullah	Am	All
(Malaysia) HZO Fortis Racing Team by Absolute Racing (Hong Kong) Absolute Racing (Indonesia) Delta Garage Racing Team by Absolute Racing	86	(Indonesia) Dypo Fitramadhan	Am	All
(South Korea) Racegraph	7	(China) Li Zhicong	P	All
(South Korea) Racegraph	7	(South Korea) Jungwoo Lee	P	2–4, 6
(South Korea) Racegraph	17	(Malaysia) Eng Peng Goh	LC	All
(South Korea) Racegraph	17	(South Korea) Jungwoo Lee	LC	1
(South Korea) Racegraph	17	(Hong Kong) Samson Chan	LC	2
(South Korea) Racegraph	17	(Hong Kong) Terence Tse	LC	3
(South Korea) Racegraph	17	(South Korea) Kim Sangho	LC	4–6
(South Korea) Racegraph	77	(Japan) Yugo Tanabe	LC	4
(South Korea) Racegraph	77	(Australia) Nicolas Stati	P	5–6
(Chinese Taipei) BC Racing	11	(Chinese Taipei) Gavin Huang	P	All
(Chinese Taipei) BC Racing	11	(Monaco) Jonathan Cecotto	P	1–4, 6
(Chinese Taipei) BC Racing	51	(Chinese Taipei) Johnson Huang	PA	All
(Chinese Taipei) BC Racing	51	(Chinese Taipei) Brian Huang	PA	All
(China) Z.SPEED	15	(Chinese Taipei) Chun Hua Chen	PA	1–5
(China) Z.SPEED	15	(Hong Kong) Ho-Pin Tung	PA	1–2
(China) Z.SPEED	15	(Germany) Tim Zimmermann	PA	3–4
(China) Z.SPEED	15	(Italy) Massimiliano Wiser	PA	5
(Hong Kong) DW Evans GT	16	(Malaysia) Nazim Azman	P	1–2, 5–6
(Hong Kong) DW Evans GT	16	(France) Emilien Carde	P	1–2, 5–6
(Germany) Leipert Motorsport	27	(Singapore) Ethan Brown	P	All
(Germany) Leipert Motorsport	27	(Sweden) Hampus Ericsson	P	1
(Germany) Leipert Motorsport	27	(Germany) Jacob Riegel	P	2, 6
(Germany) Leipert Motorsport	27	(Finland) Nikolas Pirttilahti	P	3–4
(Germany) Leipert Motorsport	89	(China) Jiajun Song	PA	All
(Germany) Leipert Motorsport	89	(New Zealand) Brendon Leitch	PA	3–6
(Macau) SJM Theodore Racing	32	(Macau) Hon Chio Leong	P	All
(Macau) SJM Theodore Racing	32	(Republic of Ireland) Alex Denning	P	All
(Malaysia) Batmobile Racing	33	(Malaysia) Kumar Prabakaran	LC	All
(Malaysia) Batmobile Racing	33	(Japan) Shinji Takei	LC	3–6
(South Korea) SQDA-GRIT Motorsport	63	(South Korea) Changwoo Lee	PA	All
(South Korea) SQDA-GRIT Motorsport	63	(Japan) Kohei Tokumasu	PA	3
(South Korea) SQDA-GRIT Motorsport	63	(China) Liang Jiatong	PA	1–2, 4–6
(Hong Kong) Kam Lung Racing	68	(Hong Kong) Bertram Lau	Am	1–3
(Hong Kong) Kam Lung Racing	68	(Hong Kong) Kenneth Lau	Am	1, 3
(Hong Kong) Kam Lung Racing	68	(Hong Kong) Mak Hing Tak	LC	5
(Thailand) Siamgas Corse	71	(Thailand) Supachai Weeraborwornpong	LC	All
(China) Madness Racing Team	77	(China) Shijie Hong	PA	2
(China) Madness Racing Team	77	(Hong Kong) Adderly Fong	PA	2
True Vision Motorsports Thailand	78	(Thailand) Suttiluck Buncharoen	Am	All
(Malaysia) Arrows Racing	83	(Hong Kong) Chi Min Ma	PA	All
(Malaysia) Arrows Racing	83	(Malaysia) Weiron Tan	PA	2–4
(Australia) Zagame Autosport	88	(Australia) Ryan Sorensen	PA	1
(Australia) Zagame Autosport	88	(Australia) Tim Macrow	PA	1
(Italy) VSR	98	(Thailand) Todd Kingsford	PA	5–6
(Italy) VSR	98	(New Zealand) Chris van der Drift	PA	5–6
(Japan) Promotion Racing	99	(Japan) Jun Tashiro	Am	3

Icon	Class
P	Pro Cup
PA	Pro-Am Cup
Am	Am Cup
LC	Lamborghini Cup
	Guest Starter

== Race results ==
Bold indicates the overall winner.

Round		Circuit	Pole position	Pro winners	Pro-Am winners	Am winners	LC Winners
1	R1	(Australia) Sydney	(Germany) No. 27 Leipert Motorsport	(Macau) No. 32 SJM Theodore Racing	(China) No. 3 LK Motorsport by Climax Racing	(China) No. 76 Climax Racing	(Thailand) No. 71 Siamgas Corse
1	R1	(Australia) Sydney	(Singapore) Ethan Brown (Sweden) Hampus Ericsson	(Macau) Hon Chio Leong (Republic of Ireland) Alex Denning	(Hong Kong) Kai Shun Liu (China) Qikuan Cao	(China) Dongsheng Li (China) Donghui Li	(Thailand) Supachai Weeraborwornpong
1	R2	(Australia) Sydney	(Macau) No. 32 SJM Theodore Racing	(Macau) No. 32 SJM Theodore Racing	(South Korea) No. 63 SQDA-GRIT Motorsport	No. 78 True Vision Motorsports Thailand	(Thailand) No. 71 Siamgas Corse
1	R2	(Australia) Sydney	(Macau) Hon Chio Leong (Republic of Ireland) Alex Denning	(Macau) Hon Chio Leong (Republic of Ireland) Alex Denning	(South Korea) Changwoo Lee (China) Liang Jiatong	(Thailand) Suttiluck Buncharoen	(Thailand) Supachai Weeraborwornpong
2	R1	(China) Shanghai	(Germany) No. 27 Leipert Motorsport	(Germany) No. 27 Leipert Motorsport	(China) No. 3 LK Motorsport by Climax Racing	(China) No. 39 Climax Racing	(Thailand) No. 71 Siamgas Corse
2	R1	(China) Shanghai	(Singapore) Ethan Brown (Germany) Jacob Riegel	(Singapore) Ethan Brown (Germany) Jacob Riegel	(Hong Kong) Kai Shun Liu (China) Qikuan Cao	(China) Kuisheng Huang (China) Huilin Han	(Thailand) Supachai Weeraborwornpong
2	R2	(China) Shanghai	(Chinese Taipei) No. 11 BC Racing	(Macau) No. 32 SJM Theodore Racing	(South Korea) No. 63 SQDA-GRIT Motorsport	No. 78 True Vision Motorsports Thailand	(South Korea) No. 17 Racegraph
2	R2	(China) Shanghai	(Chinese Taipei) Gavin Huang (Monaco) Jonathan Cecotto	(Macau) Hon Chio Leong (Republic of Ireland) Alex Denning	(South Korea) Changwoo Lee (China) Liang Jiatong	(Thailand) Suttiluck Buncharoen	(Malaysia) Eng Peng Goh (Hong Kong) Samson Chan
3	R1	(Japan) Fuji	(Germany) No. 89 Leipert Motorsport	(South Korea) No. 7 Racegraph	(China) No. 66 Climax Racing	(Japan) No. 99 Promotion Racing	(Thailand) No. 71 Siamgas Corse
3	R1	(Japan) Fuji	(China) Jiajun Song (New Zealand) Brendon Leitch	(China) Li Zhicong (South Korea) Jungwoo Lee	(Macau) Zhiwei Lu (China) Ling Kang	(Japan) Jun Tashiro	(Thailand) Supachai Weeraborwornpong
3	R2	(Japan) Fuji	(Germany) No. 27 Leipert Motorsport	(Macau) No. 32 SJM Theodore Racing	(Germany) No. 89 Leipert Motorsport	(Japan) No. 99 Promotion Racing	(Malaysia) No. 33 Batmobile Racing
3	R2	(Japan) Fuji	(Singapore) Ethan Brown (Finland) Nikolas Pirttilahti	(Macau) Hon Chio Leong (Republic of Ireland) Alex Denning	(China) Jiajun Song (New Zealand) Brendon Leitch	(Japan) Jun Tashiro	(Japan) Shinji Takei
4	R1	(South Korea) Inje	(South Korea) No. 63 SQDA-GRIT Motorsport	(Chinese Taipei) No. 11 BC Racing	(China) No. 3 LK Motorsport by Climax Racing	(Malaysia) No. 5 HZO Fortis Racing Team by Absolute Racing	(Thailand) No. 71 Siamgas Corse
4	R1	(South Korea) Inje	(South Korea) Changwoo Lee (China) Jiatong Liang	(Chinese Taipei) Gavin Huang (Monaco) Jonathan Cecotto	(Hong Kong) Kai Shun Liu (China) Qikuan Cao	(Malaysia) Haziq Zairel Oh (Malaysia) Hairie Zairel Oh	(Thailand) Supachai Weeraborwornpong
4	R2	(South Korea) Inje	(Chinese Taipei) No. 11 BC Racing	(Macau) No. 32 SJM Theodore Racing	(South Korea) No. 63 SQDA-GRIT Motorsport	(China) No. 67 Climax Racing	(South Korea) No. 17 Racegraph
4	R2	(South Korea) Inje	(Chinese Taipei) Gavin Huang (Monaco) Jonathan Cecotto	(Macau) Hon Chio Leong (Republic of Ireland) Alex Denning	(South Korea) Changwoo Lee (China) Liang Jiatong	(China) Zhang Yaqi (China) Yao Liangbo	(Malaysia) Eng Peng Goh (South Korea) Sangho Kim
5	R1	(Malaysia) Sepang	(South Korea) No. 7 Racegraph	(Macau) No. 32 SJM Theodore Racing	(Italy) No. 98 VSR	(Malaysia) No. 5 HZO Fortis Racing Team by Absolute Racing	(Thailand) No. 71 Siamgas Corse
5	R1	(Malaysia) Sepang	(China) Li Zhicong (South Korea) Jungwoo Lee	(Macau) Hon Chio Leong (Republic of Ireland) Alex Denning	(Thailand) Todd Kingsford (New Zealand) Chris van der Drift	(Malaysia) Haziq Zairel Oh (Malaysia) Hairie Zairel Oh	(Thailand) Supachai Weeraborwornpong
5	R2	(Malaysia) Sepang	(Macau) No. 32 SJM Theodore Racing	(Germany) No. 27 Leipert Motorsport	(Italy) No. 98 VSR	No. 78 True Vision Motorsports Thailand	(Thailand) No. 71 Siamgas Corse
5	R2	(Malaysia) Sepang	(Macau) Hon Chio Leong (Republic of Ireland) Alex Denning	(Singapore) Ethan Brown	(Thailand) Todd Kingsford (New Zealand) Chris van der Drift	(Thailand) Suttiluck Buncharoen	(Thailand) Supachai Weeraborwornpong
6	R1	(Italy) Misano	(South Korea) No. 77 Racegraph	(Macau) No. 32 SJM Theodore Racing	(Italy) No. 98 VSR	(China) No. 76 Climax Racing	(Thailand) No. 71 Siamgas Corse
6	R1	(Italy) Misano	(Australia) Nicolas Stati	(Macau) Hon Chio Leong (Republic of Ireland) Alex Denning	(Thailand) Todd Kingsford (New Zealand) Chris van der Drift	(China) Dongsheng Li (China) Donghui Li	(Thailand) Supachai Weeraborwornpong
6	R2	(Italy) Misano	(Italy) No. 98 VSR	(Macau) No. 32 SJM Theodore Racing	(South Korea) No. 63 SQDA-GRIT Motorsport	(China) No. 76 Climax Racing	(South Korea) No. 17 Racegraph
6	R2	(Italy) Misano	(Thailand) Todd Kingsford (New Zealand) Chris van der Drift	(Macau) Hon Chio Leong (Republic of Ireland) Alex Denning	(South Korea) Changwoo Lee (China) Liang Jiatong	(China) Dongsheng Li (China) Donghui Li	(Malaysia) Eng Peng Goh (South Korea) Sangho Kim

== Championship standings ==
=== Scoring system ===
Position	1st	2nd	3rd	4th	5th	6th	7th	8th	9th	10th	Pole
Points	15	12	10	8	6	5	4	3	2	1	1

=== Pro ===
Pos.	Driver	Team	(Australia) SYD		(China) SHA		(Japan) FUJ		(South Korea) INJ		(Malaysia) SEP		(Italy) MIS		Pts
Pos.	Driver	Team	R1	R2	R1	R2	R1	R2	R1	R2	R1	R2	R1	R2	Pts
1	(Macau) Hon Chio Leong (Republic of Ireland) Alex Denning	(Macau) SJM Theodore Racing	1	1	2	1	2	1	2	1	1	2	1	1	171
2	(Singapore) Ethan Brown	(Germany) Leipert Motorsport	2	4	1	5	3	4	4	Ret	5	1	4	3	114
3	(China) Li Zhicong	(South Korea) Racegraph	5	6	3	2	1	2	3	3	3	6	6	4	114
4	(Chinese Taipei) Gavin Huang	(Chinese Taipei) BC Racing	3	3	4	3	4	5	1	2	4	4	2	Ret	110
5	(France) Emilien Carde	(Hong Kong) DW Evans GT	4	2	5	4	5	3	Ret	4	2	3	5	5	96
6	(Monaco) Jonathan Cecotto	(Chinese Taipei) BC Racing	3	3	4	3	4	5	1	2			2	Ret	94
7	(Malaysia) Nazim Azman	(Hong Kong) DW Evans GT	4	2	5	4	5	3			2	3	5	5	88
8	(South Korea) Jungwoo Lee	(South Korea) SQDA-GRIT Motorsport			3	2	1	2	3	3			6	4	86
9	(Finland) Nikolas Pirttilahti	(Germany) Leipert Motorsport					3	4	4	Ret					27
10	(Germany) Jacob Riegel	(Germany) Leipert Motorsport			1	5							4	3	22
11	(Sweden) Hampus Ericsson	(Germany) Leipert Motorsport	2	4											21
12	(China) Kuisheng Huang (China) Yujia Gao	(China) Climax Racing	6	5											11
13	(Vietnam) Sawer Hoàng Đạt	(Hong Kong) DW Evans GT							Ret	4					8
Guest drivers ineligible for points
-	(Australia) Nicolas Stati	(South Korea) Racegraph									6	5	3	2	0
Pos.	Driver	Team	R1	R2	R1	R2	R1	R2	R1	R2	R1	R2	R1	R2	Pts
Pos.	Driver	Team	(Australia) SYD		(China) SHA		(Japan) FUJ		(South Korea) INJ		(Malaysia) SEP		(Italy) MIS		Pts

=== Pro-Am ===
Pos.	Driver	Team	(Australia) SYD		(China) SHA		(Japan) FUJ		(South Korea) INJ		(Malaysia) SEP		(Italy) MIS		Pts
Pos.	Driver	Team	R1	R2	R1	R2	R1	R2	R1	R2	R1	R2	R1	R2	Pts
1	(Hong Kong) Kai Shun Liu (China) Qikuan Cao	(China) LK Motorsport by Climax Racing	1	2	1	2	4	4	1	4	4	5	3	4	139
2	(South Korea) Changwoo Lee	(South Korea) SQDA-GRIT Motorsport	3	1	Ret	1	5	3	3	1	3	6	1	2	137
3	(China) Liang Jiatong	(South Korea) SQDA-GRIT Motorsport	3	1	Ret	1			3	1	3	6	1	2	121
4	(Macau) Zhiwei Lu (China) Ling Kang	(China) Climax Racing	2	6	Ret	3	1	Ret	5	3	6	3	Ret	3	96
5	(Chinese Taipei) Chun Hua Chen	(China) Z.SPEED	4	3	Ret	DNS	2	2	2	6	5	4			81
6	(China) Jiajun Song (New Zealand) Brendon Leitch	(Germany) Leipert Motorsport					3	3	6	2	7	7	4	Ret	68
7	(Chinese Taipei) Johnson Huang (Chinese Taipei) Brian Huang	(Chinese Taipei) BC Racing	8	5	4	Ret	7	5	4	7	Ret	8	5	5	65
8	(Hong Kong) Chi Min Ma (Malaysia) Weiron Tan	(Malaysia) Arrows Racing	7	8	2	Ret	6	6	7	5					42
9	(Germany) Tim Zimmermann	(China) Z.SPEED					2	2	2	6					41
10	(Hong Kong) Ho-Pin Tung	(China) Z.SPEED			Ret	DNS									18
11	(Japan) Kohei Tokumasu	(South Korea) SQDA-GRIT Motorsport													16
12	(Malaysia) Eng Peng Goh (South Korea) Jungwoo Lee	(South Korea) Racegraph	6	7											11
Guest drivers ineligible for points
-	(Thailand) Todd Kingsford (New Zealand) Chris van der Drift	(Italy) VSR									1	1	2	1	0
-	(China) Zhou Bihuang (Australia) Bryce Fullwood	(China) Climax Racing									2	2			0
-	(China) Shijie Hong (Hong Kong) Adderly Fong	(China) Madness Racing Team			3	Ret									0
-	(Japan) Kohei Tokumasu	(South Korea) SQDA-GRIT Motorsport					5	3							0
-	(Australia) Ryan Sorensen (Australia) Tim Macrow	(Australia) Zagame Autosport	5	4											0
-	(Italy) Massimiliano Wiser	(China) Z.SPEED									5	4			0
Pos.	Driver	Team	R1	R2	R1	R2	R1	R2	R1	R2	R1	R2	R1	R2	Pts
Pos.	Driver	Team	(Australia) SYD		(China) SHA		(Japan) FUJ		(South Korea) INJ		(Malaysia) SEP		(Italy) MIS		Pts

=== Am ===
Pos.	Driver	Team	(Australia) SYD		(China) SHA		(Japan) FUJ		(South Korea) INJ		(Malaysia) SEP		(Italy) MIS		Pts
Pos.	Driver	Team	R1	R2	R1	R2	R1	R2	R1	R2	R1	R2	R1	R2	Pts
1	(Thailand) Suttiluck Buncharoen	True Vision Motorsports Thailand	5	1	3	1	3	5	3	4	4	1	4	2	132
2	(Malaysia) Haziq Zairel Oh (Malaysia) Hairie Zairel Oh	(Malaysia) HZO Fortis Racing Team by Absolute Racing	2	5	2	Ret	6	2	1	Ret	1	4	2	4	116
3	(China) Dongsheng Li (China) Donghui Li	(China) Climax Racing	1	2	Ret	DNS	Ret	4	2	2	3	Ret	1	1	107
4	(Indonesia) Umar Abdullah (Indonesia) Dypo Fitramadhan	(Indonesia) Delta Garage Racing Team by Absolute Racing	3	4	Ret	3	2	6	4	3	2	2	Ret	3	103
5	(China) Kuisheng Huang (China) Huilin Han	(China) Climax Racing			1	2									29
6	(China) Liangbo Yao (China) Zhang Yaqi	(China) Climax Racing					4	Ret	Ret	1					26
7	(Hong Kong) Bertram Lau	(Hong Kong) Kam Lung Racing			4	4	Ret	DNS							26
8	(China) Jiajun Song	(Germany) Leipert Motorsport	4	3	Ret	5									25
9	(Hong Kong) Kenneth Lau	(Hong Kong) Kam Lung Racing	6	6			Ret	DNS							10
Guest drivers ineligible for points
-	(Japan) Jun Tashiro	(Japan) Promotion Racing					1	1							0
-	(Malaysia) Harith Zairel Oh (Malaysia) Aaron Lim	(Malaysia) HZO Fortis Racing Team by Absolute Racing									5	3			0
-	(Italy) Vincenzo Ricci (China) Du Tian Hao	(Hong Kong) Absolute Racing					5	3							0
-	(China) Zhou Bihuang (Australia) Damien Hamilton	(China) Climax Racing											3	Ret	0
Pos.	Driver	Team	R1	R2	R1	R2	R1	R2	R1	R2	R1	R2	R1	R2	Pts
Pos.	Driver	Team	(Australia) SYD		(China) SHA		(Japan) FUJ		(South Korea) INJ		(Malaysia) SEP		(Italy) MIS		Pts

=== Lamborghini Cup ===
Pos.	Driver	Team	(Australia) SYD		(China) SHA		(Japan) FUJ		(South Korea) INJ		(Malaysia) SEP		(Italy) MIS		Pts
Pos.	Driver	Team	R1	R2	R1	R2	R1	R2	R1	R2	R1	R2	R1	R2	Pts
1	(Thailand) Supachai Weeraborwornpong	(Thailand) Siamgas Corse	1	1	1	2	2	2	1	3	1	1	2	1	169
2	(Malaysia) Kumar Prabakaran	(Malaysia) Batmobile Racing	2	2	2	3	3		3	2	3	2	4	4	122
3	(Malaysia) Eng Peng Goh	(South Korea) Racegraph			3	1	1	3	2	1	2	Ret	1	2	116
4	(Japan) Shinji Takei	(Malaysia) Batmobile Racing					3	1	3	2	3	2			71
5	(South Korea) Sangho Kim	(South Korea) Racegraph							2	1	2	Ret	1	2	66
6	(Hong Kong) Chi Min Ma	(Malaysia) Arrows Racing									4	3	3	3	38
7	(Hong Kong) Samson Chan	(South Korea) Racegraph			3	1									25
8	(Hong Kong) Terence Tse	(South Korea) Racegraph					1	3							25
Guest drivers ineligible for points
-	(Japan) Yugo Tanabe	(South Korea) Racegraph							4	4					0
-	(Hong Kong) Mak Hing Tak	(Hong Kong) Kam Lung Racing									5	4			0
Pos.	Driver	Team	R1	R2	R1	R2	R1	R2	R1	R2	R1	R2	R1	R2	Pts
Pos.	Driver	Team	(Australia) SYD		(China) SHA		(Japan) FUJ		(South Korea) INJ		(Malaysia) SEP		(Italy) MIS		Pts

=== Teams ===
Pos.	Team	Pts
1	(Macau) SJM Theodore Racing	170
2	(Germany) Leipert Motorsport	119
3	(South Korea) Racegraph	100
4	(Chinese Taipei) BC Racing	99
5	(Hong Kong) DW Evans GT	87
6	(South Korea) SQDA-GRIT Motorsport	57
7	(China) LK Motorsport by Climax Racing	39
8	(China) Climax Racing	32
9	(China) Z.SPEED	30
10	(China) Hudson Auto by LKM	15
11	(Malaysia) HZO Fortis Racing Team by Absolute Racing	10
12	(Indonesia) Delta Garage Racing Team by Absolute Racing	6
13	True Vision Motorsports Thailand	6
14	(Malaysia) Arrows Racing	4
15	(Malaysia) Batmobile Racing	2
Pos.	Team	Pts
