= Alex Sawer =

Vietnamese racing driver

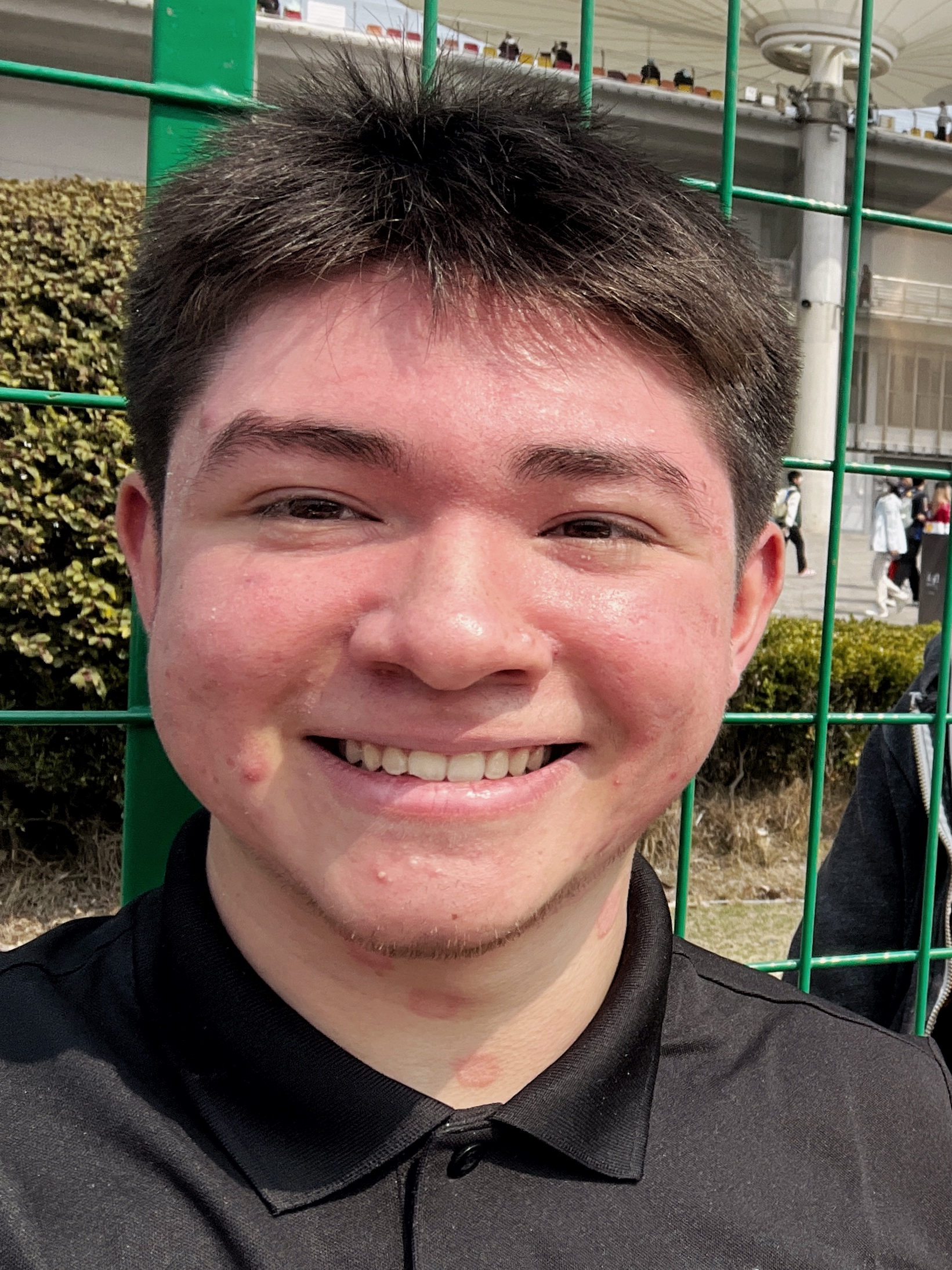
- Sawer at the 2026 Chinese Grand Prix
- Nationality: (Vietnam) Vietnamese
- Born: Sawer Hoàng Đạt; 4 November 2007 (age 19) Ho Chi Minh City, Vietnam

Porsche Carrera Cup Asia career
- Debut season: 2026
- Current team: Porsche Vietnam
- Car number: 12
- Starts: 6
- Wins: 0
- Podiums: 2
- Poles: 0
- Fastest laps: 0
- Best finish: TBD in 2026

Previous series
- 2025 2024 2024 2024 2023: Formula 4 South East Asia Championship; Formula Regional Middle East Championship; Formula Regional European Championship; F4 Chinese Championship; F4 Indian Championship

Championship titles
- 2025: Formula 4 South East Asia Championship

Sawer Hoàng Đạt (born 4 November 2007), (Note: Other sources state that Alex Sawer was born in 2008.) also known as Alex Sawer, is a Vietnamese racing driver who competes in Porsche Carrera Cup Asia with Porsche Vietnam. He previously competed in the 2025 Formula 4 South East Asia Championship driving for Evans GP.

== Career ==
=== F4 Indian Championship ===
==== 2023 ====
Sawer made his open-wheel racing debut in the 2023 F4 Indian Championship driving for the Hyderabad Blackbirds. In the opening two rounds of the championship, he would finish on the podium twice. Sawer followed that up with a win in the second half of the season. He rounded out the season with three more podiums and finished fifth in the championship.

=== F4 Chinese Championship ===
==== 2024 ====
On 11 April 2024, it was announced that Sawer would compete in select rounds of the 2024 F4 Chinese Championship for BlackJack Racing. In the opening race of the season at Shanghai, he qualified on pole ahead of Fukang Jiang by 0.066s. Sawer would convert that into a victory, leading much of the race and finishing four seconds ahead of second place drive Oscar Pedersen. During his return to the series at Ningbo, Sawer started on reverse grid pole in race 4, and went on to win his second race of the season. Despite only contesting six out of the eighteen races, Sawer still finished seventh in the championship.

=== Formula Regional European Championship ===
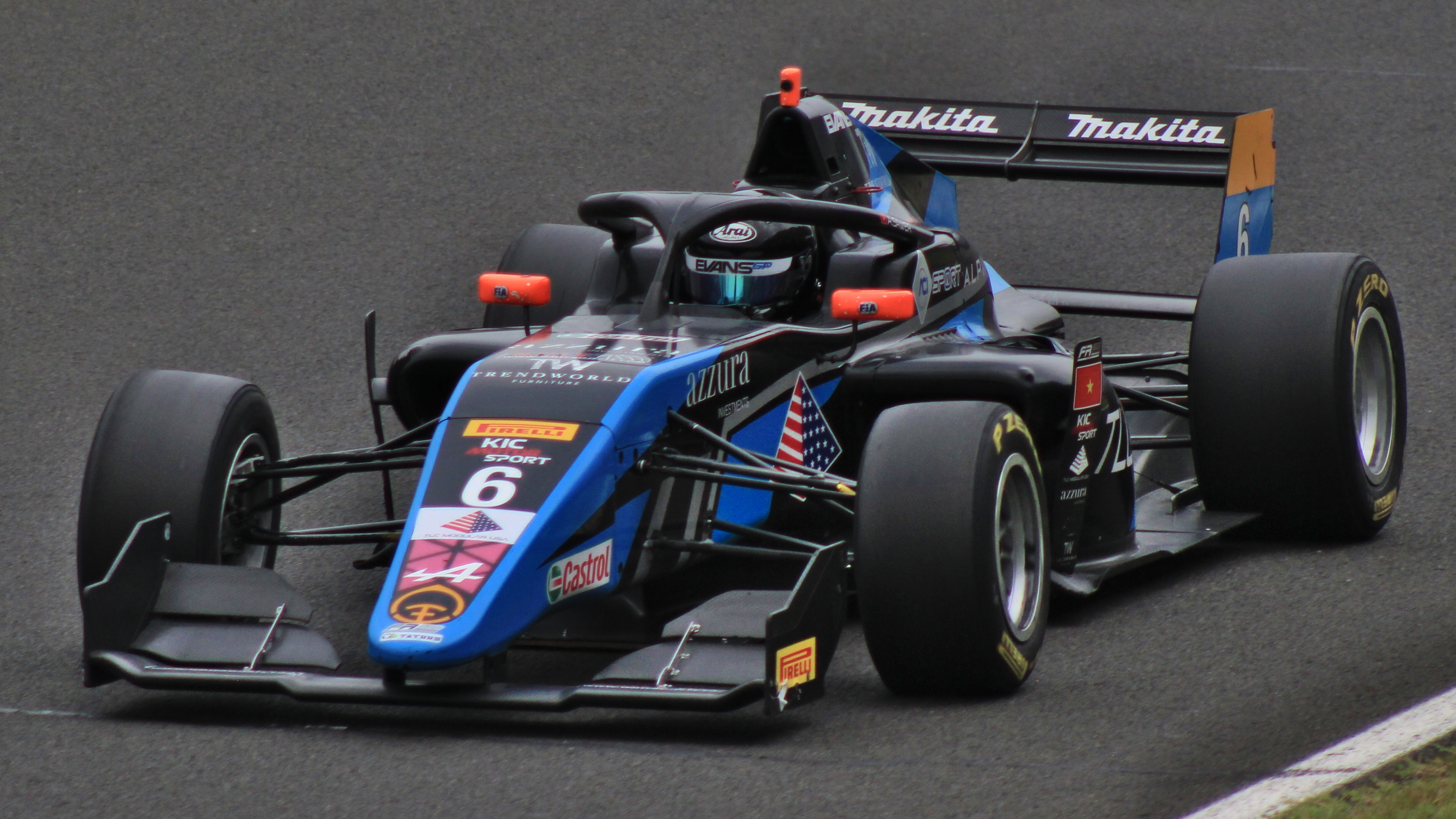
Sawer driving at the Hungaroring during the 2024 Formula Regional European Championship

==== 2024 ====
Sawer's primary 2024 campaign would be in the Formula Regional European Championship, where he would contest the full season with KIC Motorsport. He would have a difficult season, not finishing in the points once during the season.

=== Formula Regional Middle East Championship ===
==== 2024 ====
In February 2025, Sawer signed with Evans GP to compete in the 2024 Formula Regional Middle East Championship starting in the third round at Dubai. He would only finish in the points once in his starts at Lusail, and finished 24th in the standings.

=== Formula 4 South East Asia Championship ===
==== 2025 ====
For 2025, Sawer announced that he would be competing in the 2025 Formula 4 South East Asia Championship driving for Evans GP. He would have a dominant start to the season, qualifying on pole for races one and three, and winning all three races.

== Personal life ==
Sawer was born to a British father and a Vietnamese mother. He currently lives in Ho Chi Minh City. He was coached by Australian-Malaysian driver Mitch Gilbert.

== Karting record ==
=== Karting career summary ===
Season	Series	Team	Position
2023	Winter Cup — OK	Parolin Motorsport	26th
2023	WSK Champions Cup — X30 Senior	Falcon Racing Team	39th
2023	Champions of the Future — OK	Falcon Racing Team	88th
2023	WSK Euro Series — 60 Mini	Falcon Racing Team	73rd

== Racing record ==
=== Racing career summary ===
Season	Series	Team	Races	Wins	Poles	F/Laps	Podiums	Points	Position
2023	F4 Indian Championship	Hyderabad Blackbirds	14	1	0	0	6	186	5th
2024	F4 Chinese Championship	PingTan Raxing Team by BlackJack	6	2	1	1	2	84	7th
2024	Formula Regional European Championship	KIC Motorsport	16	0	0	0	0	0	32nd
2025	Formula Regional Middle East Championship	Evans GP	9	0	0	0	0	1	24th
2025	Formula 4 South East Asia Championship	Evans GP	14	9	6	9	12	359	**1st**
2025	Lamborghini Super Trofeo Asia - Pro	DW Evans GT	2	0	0	0	0	8	13th
2026	Porsche Carrera Cup Asia	Porsche Vietnam	11	0	0	0	0	91.5	7th
2026	Porsche Carrera Cup Japan	Bergwerk with Seven x Seven Racing	1	0	0	0	0	6	19th
2026	Porsche Carrera Cup Germany	GP Elite	2	0	0	0	0	2	29th
2026	China GT Championship - GT3	Apex Predator Racing							

* Season still in progress.

=== Complete F4 Indian Championship results ===
(key) (Races in bold indicate pole position) (Races in italics indicate fastest lap)

Year	Entrant	1	2	3	4	5	6	7	8	9	10	11	12	13	14	15	Pos	Points
2023	Hyderabad Blackbirds	MIC1; 1; 4	MIC1; 2; 10	MIC1; 3; 2	MIC2; 1; 5	MIC2; 2; 3	MIC2; 3 DNS	MIC3; 1; 4	MIC3; 2; 5	MIC3; 3; 6	MIC3; 4; 1	MIC3; 5; 4	MIC4; 1; 3	MIC4; 2; 2	MIC4; 3; 4	MIC4; 4; 2	5th	186

=== Complete F4 Chinese Championship results ===
(key) (Races in bold indicate pole position) (Races in italics indicate fastest lap)

Year	Team	1	2	3	4	5	6	7	8	9	10	11	12	13	14	15	16	17	18	DC	Points
2024	PingTan Raxing Team by BlackJack	**SIC1**; **1**; 1	SIC1; 2; 5	CTC; 1	CTC; 2	CTC; 3	CTC; 4	NIC; 1; 4	NIC; 2 Ret	NIC; 3; 4	NIC; 4; 1	SIC2; 1	SIC2; 2	SIC2; 3	SIC2; 4	ZIC; 1	ZIC; 2	ZIC; 3	ZIC; 4	7th	84

=== Complete Formula Regional European Championship results ===
(key) (Races in bold indicate pole position) (Races in italics indicate fastest lap)

Year	Team	1	2	3	4	5	6	7	8	9	10	11	12	13	14	15	16	17	18	19	20	DC	Points
2024	KIC Motorsport	HOC; 1; 25	HOC; 2 Ret	SPA; 1; 24	SPA; 2; 28†	ZAN; 1; 23	ZAN; 2; 24	HUN; 1; 22	HUN; 2; 22	MUG; 1; 28	MUG; 2; 32†	LEC; 1; 21	LEC; 2; 21	IMO; 1	IMO; 2	RBR; 1 WD	RBR; 2 WD	CAT; 1; 26	CAT; 2; 18	MNZ; 1; 26†	MNZ; 2; 20	32nd	0

=== Complete Formula Regional Middle East Championship results ===
(key) (Races in bold indicate pole position) (Races in italics indicate fastest lap)

Year	Entrant	1	2	3	4	5	6	7	8	9	10	11	12	13	14	15	DC	Points
2025	Evans GP	YMC1; 1	YMC1; 2	YMC1; 3	YMC2; 1	YMC2; 2	YMC2; 3	DUB; 1; 20	DUB; 2; 26	DUB; 3; 20	YMC3; 1; 21	YMC3; 2; 18	YMC3; 3 Ret	LUS; 1; 18	LUS; 2; 12	LUS; 3; 21	24th	1

=== Complete Formula 4 South East Asia Championship results ===
(key) (Races in bold indicate pole position) (Races in italics indicate fastest lap)

Year	Entrant	1	2	3	4	5	6	7	8	9	10	11	12	13	14	Pos	Points
2025	Evans GP	**SEP1**; **1**; 1	SEP1; 2; 1	**SEP1**; **3**; 1	**BUR**; **1**; 1	BUR; 2; 1	**BUR**; **3**; 1	**BAN**; **1** Ret	BAN; 2; 1	SEP2; 1; 1	SEP2; 2; 4	**SEP2**; **3**; 1	SEP3; 1; 2	SEP3; 2; 3	SEP3; 3; 2	1st	359
