= Yuanpu Cui =

Chinese racing driver (born 2008)

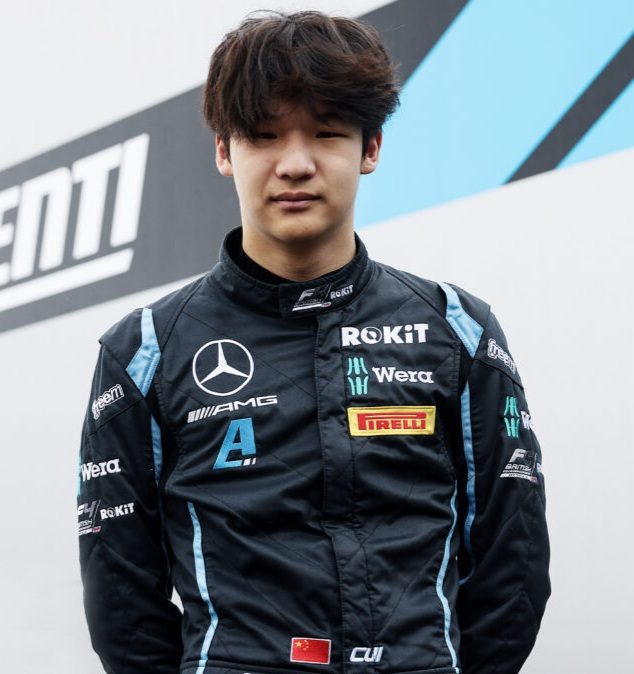
- Cui in 2023
- Born: 18 February 2008 (age 18) Xi'an, China
- Nationality: (China) Chinese

GB3 Championship career
- Debut season: 2025
- Current team: Hillspeed
- Car number: 56
- Former teams: Argenti with Prema
- Starts: 15
- Wins: 0
- Podiums: 0
- Poles: 0
- Fastest laps: 0
- Best finish: 18th in 2025

Previous series
- 2025 2025 2024 2024 2024 2023: Formula Regional European; FR Middle East; F4 British; F4 Chinese; F4 UAE; Euro 4

Chinese name
- Traditional Chinese: 崔元普
- Simplified Chinese: 崔元普
- Hanyu Pinyin: Cuī YuánPǔ

Yuanpu Cui (Chinese: 崔元普; pinyin: Cuī YuánPǔ; born 18 February 2008) is a Chinese racing driver who is set to compete in Eurocup-3 for Double R Racing. Cui has previously competed in GB3 for Hillspeed.

== Career ==
=== Karting ===
Cui first joined the European stage in 2016 at the age of eight, by competing in the Rotax Max Challenge Grand Finals in the Micro Max category. He finished 33rd in the standings. He then continued in Europe in 2017, competing in the IAME International Final at Le Mans. His best result in 2018 came in ROK the Rio, finishing 16th as he stepped up to Mini karting. For 2019, Cui achieved two top-ten positions in the championship in the same category, finishing sixth in the WSK Open Cup, and eighth at the Macao International Kart Grand Prix. Cui secured his first championship podium in Europe in 2020, by finishing second in the Andrea Margutti Trophy after a step up to the OKJ category. In 2021, he won his first title by securing the championship in the ROK Cup Superfinal. For 2022 and 2023, Cui competed in OK karting.

=== Formula 4 ===
At the end of the 2023 season, Argenti Motorsport announced that Cui would be joining the team for the 2024 F4 British Championship. In early 2024, Cui was confirmed to be competing in the Formula 4 UAE Championship from round 2 onwards. He finished in 24th in the standings amongst a talented grid, scoring two points after a ninth place in round four at the Yas Marina Circuit. Cui then moved on to his main campaign for 2024, in the F4 British Championship. He secured his first win at the reverse-grid race at Snetterton. He finished ninth in the standings.

=== Formula Regional ===
==== 2025 ====
At the start of 2025, Cui competed in the Formula Regional Middle East Championship with Pinnacle Motorsport.

During the eighth round of the Formula Regional European Championship at Circuit de Barcelona-Catalunya, Cui was entered with Prema Racing as a wildcard driver.

==== 2026 ====
During the winter, Cui would race in the Formula Regional Oceania Trophy with mtec Motorsport.

=== GB3 Championship ===
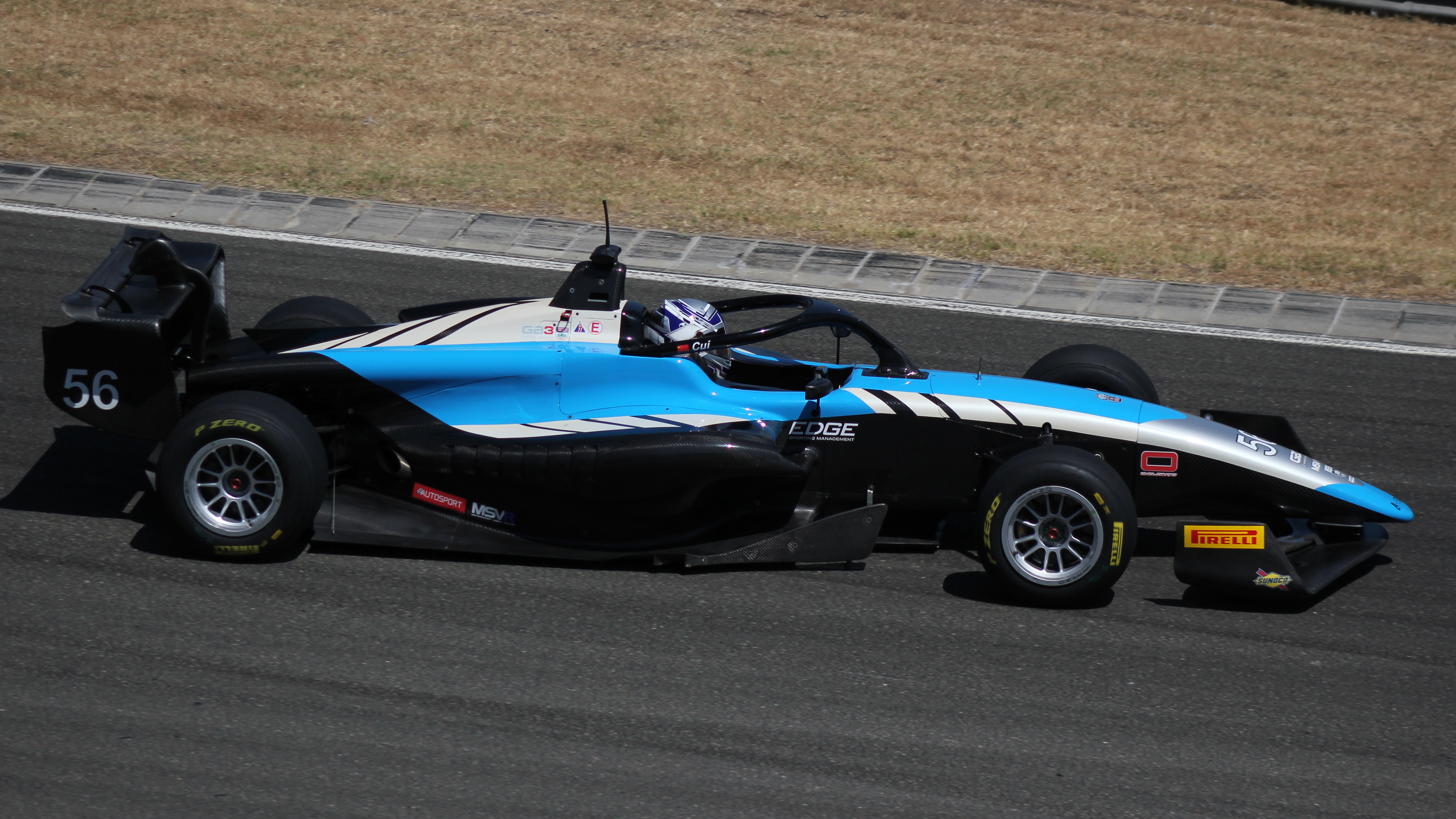
Cui driving at the Hungaroring during the 2025 GB3 Championship

Cui moved up to in GB3 in 2025, joining Argenti with Prema. Following the Hungaroring round however, Cui made a mid-season switch to Hillspeed.

=== Formula One ===
In 2021, Mercedes picked up on Cui's performances in karting and added him to their Junior Team's roster. At the end of 2025, he was released from Mercedes.

== Karting record ==
=== Karting career summary ===
Season	Series	Team	Position
2016	Rotax Max Challenge Grand Finals - Micro Max	Icepol Racing Team	33rd
2017	IAME International Final - X30 Mini		14th
2018	WSK Super Master Series - 60 Mini	Tony Kart Racing Team	59th
2018	WSK Open Cup - 60 Mini	Tony Kart Racing Team	NC
2018	WSK Final Cup - 60 Mini	Tony Kart Racing Team	55th
2018	ROK The Rio - Mini Rok		16th
2019	WSK Super Master Series - 60 Mini	Tony Kart Racing Team	62nd
2019	WSK Euro Series - 60 Mini	Tony Kart Racing Team	33rd
2019	South Garda Winter Cup - Mini Rok	Beyond Racing Team	NC
2019	Andrea Margutti Trophy - 60 Mini	Beyond Racing Team	21st
2019	WSK Open Cup - 60 Mini	Gamoto ASD	6th
2019	Trofeo delle Industrie - 60 Mini	Gamoto ASD	16th
2019	Florida Winter Tour - Mini Rok	Team Montoya	34th
2019	WSK Final Cup - 60 Mini	Gamoto ASD	17th
2019	Macao International Kart Grand Prix - Mini Rok	Gamoto Racing Team	8th
2020	Florida Winter Tour - Mini Rok	Supertune	21st
2020	WSK Champions Cup - 60 Mini	Gamoto ASD	11th
2020	WSK Super Master Series - 60 Mini	Gamoto ASD	19th
2020	South Garda Winter Cup - Mini Rok	Gamoto ASD	22nd
2020	CIK-FIA European Championship - OKJ	KR Motorsport	47th
2020	WSK Euro Series - OKJ	KR Motorsport	40th
2020	Champions of the Future - OKJ	KR Motorsport	39th
2020	CIK-FIA World Championship - OKJ	KR Motorsport	NC
2020	Andrea Margutti Trophy - OKJ	KR Motorsport	2nd
2020	WSK Open Cup - OKJ	KR Motorsport	18th
2020	ROK Cup International Final - Junior Rok	Beyond Racing Team	NC
2020	Italian ACI Championship - OKJ		11th
2021	WSK Champions Cup - OKJ	KR Motorsport	NC
2021	WSK Super Master Series - OKJ	KR Motorsport	26th
2021	WSK Euro Series - OKJ	KR Motorsport	43rd
2021	Champions of the Future - OKJ	KR Motorsport	33rd
2021	CIK-FIA European Championship - OKJ	KR Motorsport	39th
2021	WSK Open Cup - OKJ	KR Motorsport	41st
2021	CIK-FIA World Championship - OKJ	KR Motorsport	NC
2021	Italian ACI Championship - OKJ		22nd
2021	IAME Euro Series - X30 Junior	Beyond Racing Team	20th
2021	ROK Cup Superfinal - Junior Rok	Beyond Racing Team	1st
2021	Trofeo delle Industrie - OKJ	Beyond Racing Team	16th
2021	South Garda Winter Cup - OKJ	Beyond Racing Team	30th
2021	WSK Final Cup - OKJ	Beyond Racing Team	23rd
2022	Champions of the Future Winter Series - OK	KR Motorsport	28th
2022	WSK Super Master Series - OK	KR Motorsport	24th
2022	Champions of the Future - OK	KR Motorsport	16th
2022	CIK-FIA European Championship - OK	KR Motorsport	24th
2022	WSK Euro Series - OK	KR Motorsport	7th
2022	CIK-FIA World Championship - OK	KR Motorsport	23rd
2022	WSK Open Cup - OK	KR Motorsport	11th
2022	WSK Final Cup - OK	KR Motorsport	8th
2022	Andrea Margutti Trophy - X30 Senior	Beyond Racing Team	4th
2023	IAME Winter Cup - X30 Senior	KR Motorsport	17th
2023	WSK Super Master Series - OK	Prema Racing	26th
2023	Champions of the Future - OK	Prema Racing	45th
2023	CIK-FIA European Championship - OK	Prema Racing	73rd

=== Complete Macao International Kart Grand Prix results ===
Year	Series	Team	Class	Pre-Final	Final
2016	Asian Karting Open Championship	Golden Racing Team	Mini Rok	?	?
2018	Asian Karting Open Championship	Mars Racing Team	Mini Rok	?	22nd
2019	Asian Karting Open Championship	Gamoto Racing Team	Mini Rok	19th	8th

== Racing record ==
=== Racing career summary ===
Season	Series	Team	Races	Wins	Poles	F/Laps	Podiums	Points	Position
2023	Euro 4 Championship	Argenti Motorsport	0	0	0	0	0	0	NC
2024	Formula 4 UAE Championship	Xcel Motorsport	12	0	0	0	0	2	24th
2024	F4 British Championship	Phinsys by Argenti	30	1	0	0	2	102.5	9th
2024	F4 Chinese Championship	Black Blade Racing	4	2	2	3	2	62	11th
2025	Formula Regional Middle East Championship	Pinnacle Motorsport	6	0	0	0	0	0	28th
2025	GB3 Championship	Argenti with Prema	12	0	0	0	0	122	18th
2025	GB3 Championship	Hillspeed	3	0	0	0	0	122	18th
2025	Formula Regional European Championship	Prema Racing	4	0	0	0	0	0	NC†
2026	Formula Regional Oceania Trophy	mtec Motorsport	15	0	0	0	0	157	9th
2026	Eurocup-3 Spanish Winter Championship	Double R Racing	9	0	0	0	0	7	18th
2026	Shanghai 8 Hours	Tarmac by Climax Racing	1	0	0	0	1	N/A	**2nd**
2026	China GT Championship - GT3	Climax Racing							

† As Cui was a guest driver, he was ineligible for points.

=== Complete Formula 4 UAE Championship results ===
(key) (Races in bold indicate pole position; races in italics indicate fastest lap)

Year	Team	1	2	3	4	5	6	7	8	9	10	11	12	13	14	15	DC	Points
2024	Xcel Motorsport	YMC1; 1	YMC1; 2	YMC1; 3	YMC2; 1; 28	YMC2; 2; 28†	YMC2; 3; 11	DUB1; 1; 21	DUB1; 2; 27	DUB1; 3; 24	YMC3; 1; 20	YMC3; 2; 11	YMC3; 3; 9	DUB2; 1; 21	DUB2; 2; 21	DUB2; 3; 20	24th	2

=== Complete F4 British Championship results ===
(key) (Races in bold indicate pole position) (Races in italics indicate fastest lap)

Year	Team	1	2	3	4	5	6	7	8	9	10	11	12	13	14	15	16	17	18	19	20	21	22	23	24	25	26	27	28	29	30	31	32	DC	Points
2024	Phinsys by Argenti	DPN; 1; 4	DPN; 2; 10	DPN; 3 C	BHI; 1; 8	BHI; 2; 13	BHI; 3; 5	SNE; 1; 8	SNE; 2; 1^{1}	SNE; 3; 11	THR; 1 DSQ	THR; 2; 8	THR; 3 Ret	SILGP; 1; 6	SILGP; 2; 7	SILGP; 3; 13	ZAN; 1; 7	ZAN; 2; 6^{2}	ZAN; 3; 11	KNO; 1; 10	KNO; 2; 3^{1}	KNO; 3; 9	DPGP; 1; 9	DPGP; 2; 8	DPGP; 3; 8	DPGP; 4; 6	SILN; 1; 14	SILN; 2 C	SILN; 3; 14	BHGP; 1; 11	BHGP; 2; 15	BHGP; 3; 11^{3}	BHGP; 4; 7	9th	102.5

=== Complete F4 Chinese Championship results ===
(key) (Races in bold indicate pole position) (Races in italics indicate fastest lap)

Year	Team	1	2	3	4	5	6	7	8	9	10	11	12	13	14	15	16	17	18	DC	Points
2024	Venom Motorsport	SIC1; 1	SIC1; 2	CTC; 1	CTC; 2	CTC; 3	CTC; 4	NIC; 1	NIC; 2	NIC; 3	NIC; 4	SIC2; 1; 1	SIC2; 2; 23	SIC2; 3; 1	SIC2; 4; 4	ZIC; 1	ZIC; 2	ZIC; 3	ZIC; 4	11th	62

=== Complete Formula Regional Middle East Championship results ===
(key) (Races in bold indicate pole position) (Races in italics indicate fastest lap)

Year	Entrant	1	2	3	4	5	6	7	8	9	10	11	12	13	14	15	DC	Points
2025	Pinnacle Motorsport	YMC1; 1	YMC1; 2	YMC1; 3	YMC2; 1	YMC2; 2	YMC2; 3	DUB; 1; 15	DUB; 2; 21	DUB; 3; 17	YMC3; 1; 24†	YMC3; 2; 21	YMC3; 3; 21	LUS; 1	LUS; 2	LUS; 3	28th	0

=== Complete GB3 Championship results ===
(key) (Races in bold indicate pole position) (Races in italics indicate fastest lap)

Year	Team	1	2	3	4	5	6	7	8	9	10	11	12	13	14	15	16	17	18	19	20	21	22	23	24	DC	Points
2025	Argenti with Prema	SIL1; 1; 20	SIL1; 2; 12	SIL1; 3; 10^{5}	ZAN; 1; 6	ZAN; 2; 6	ZAN; 3 Ret	SPA; 1; 13	SPA; 2; 15	SPA; 3; 15	HUN; 1; 12	HUN; 2; 12	HUN; 3; 16†													18th	122
2025	Hillspeed													SIL2; 1; 7	SIL2; 2; 8	SIL2; 3; 11	BRH; 1	BRH; 2	BRH; 3	DON; 1	DON; 2	DON; 3	MNZ; 1	MNZ; 2	MNZ; 3	18th	122

=== Complete Formula Regional European Championship results ===
(key) (Races in bold indicate pole position) (Races in italics indicate fastest lap)

Year	Team	1	2	3	4	5	6	7	8	9	10	11	12	13	14	15	16	17	18	19	20	DC	Points
2025	Prema Racing	MIS; 1	MIS; 2	SPA; 1	SPA; 2	ZAN; 1	ZAN; 2	HUN; 1	HUN; 2	LEC; 1	LEC; 2	IMO; 1	IMO; 2	RBR; 1	RBR; 2	CAT; 1; 18	CAT; 2; 25	HOC; 1; 13	HOC; 2; 20	MNZ; 1	MNZ; 2	NC†	0

* Season still in progress.

† As Cui was a guest driver, he was ineligible for points.

=== Complete Formula Regional Oceania Trophy results ===
(key) (Races in bold indicate pole position) (Races in italics indicate fastest lap)

Year	Team	1	2	3	4	5	6	7	8	9	10	11	12	13	14	15	16	DC	Points
2026	mtec Motorsport	HMP; 1; 11	HMP; 2; 18	HMP; 3; 8	HMP; 4; 9	TAU; 1; 10	TAU; 2; 6	TAU; 3 Ret	TAU; 4; 6	TER; 1; 11	TER; 2; 12	TER; 3 C	TER; 4; 4	HIG; 1; 7	HIG; 2; 12	HIG; 3 Ret	HIG; 4; 14	9th	157

=== Complete Eurocup-3 Spanish Winter Championship results ===
(key) (Races in bold indicate pole position) (Races in italics indicate fastest lap)

Year	Team	1	2	3	4	5	6	7	8	9	DC	Points
2026	Double R Racing	POR; 1; 14	POR; SPR; 14	POR; 2; 12	JAR; 1; 9	JAR; SPR; 12	JAR; 2; 10	ARA; 1; 22	ARA; SPR; 19	ARA; 2; 7	17th	9
