= Kyuho Lee =

South Korean racing driver (born 2008)

- Nationality: (South Korea) South Korean
- Born: 23 December 2008 (age 17) Daegu, South Korea

GB3 Championship career
- Debut season: 2026
- Current team: Elite Motorsport
- Categorisation: FIA Silver
- Car number: 19
- Starts: 23
- Wins: 0
- Podiums: 0
- Poles: 0
- Fastest laps: 0
- Best finish: 10th in 2026

Previous series
- 2025 2025 2025 2025: F4 South East Asia; F4 Spanish; Eurocup-4 Winter; F4 Middle East

Awards
- 2024: KARA Rising Star Award

Korean name
- Hangul: 이규호
- RR: I Gyuho
- MR: I Kyuho
- Statistics up to date as of 10 November 2026.

Lee Kyu-ho (Korean: 이규호; born 23 December 2008) is a South Korean racing driver who last competed for Elite Motorsport in the GB3 Championship.

Lee is a member of the Genesis Magma Racing Trajectory Programme.

== Career ==
=== Karting (2017–2024) ===
Lee began karting in 2017 by racing in micro karts, most notably winning the KARA Kart Championship the following year, earning him a ticket to the end-of-year RMC Grand Finals. In 2019, Lee took the KIC Cup Rotax Max Challenge title in the Novice class, before taking the Junior Max title in 2020 and an invitation to the 2021 RMC Grand Finals. Another junior title then followed in 2021, before Lee took the Senior title in 2022 and represented South Korea in the Karting Academy Trophy. The following year, Lee scored his third Senior title in the KIC Kart Championship, earning him his third invite to the RMC Grand Finals. Moving to Europe full-time in 2024, Lee most notably won the first ever edition of the OK-N Karting World Cup. During 2024, Lee represented South Korea in the FIA Motorsport Games Sprint Cup discipline and was also given the KARA Rising Star Award at the end-of-year KARA Prize Giving.

=== Formula 4 (2025) ===
In early 2025, Lee made his single-seater debut, competing in the first two rounds of the F4 Middle East Championship for Pinnacle Motorsport, in which he took a best result of ninth in race three of the first Yas Marina round. For the rest of the winter, Lee joined Rodin Motorsport to compete in the inaugural edition of the Eurocup-4 Spanish Winter Championship and the main F4 Spanish Championship. With the New Zealand team, Lee took only one points finish all year, a tenth-place finish in race three at Navarra in the main series, to take 22nd in points. During 2025, Lee also made a one-off appearance in the Formula 4 South East Asia Championship for Evans GP at the penultimate round of the season, finishing on the podium in all three races, as well as racing in the inaugural FIA F4 World Cup.

=== Formula Regional (2026) ===
The following year, Lee joined Elite Motorsport to make the step-up to the GB3 Championship, as a new member of the Genesis Magma Racing Trajectory Programme. In his first season in GB3, Lee was stripped of a podium at Silverstone on post-race penalties, and then taking a best result of fifth at the Hungaroring en route to tenth in overall standings. During 2026, Lee also made a one-off appearance in the Formula Regional European Championship for CL Motorsport at Monza.

=== Sportscars (2026) ===
Towards the end of 2026, Lee partook in the European Le Mans Series rookie tests, driving R-ace GP's Duqueine D09, prior to joining them for the 2026–27 Asian Le Mans Cup in the LMP3 Pro class.

== Karting record ==
=== Karting career summary ===
Season	Series	Team	Position
2017	KARA Kart Academy — Micro Max		
2018	KARA Kart Championship — Micro Max	Pino Kart	1st
2018	KIC Cup Rotax Max Challenge — Micro Max	Pino Kart	
2018	RMC Grand Finals — Micro Max	TRK Promotion	33rd
2019	KIC Cup Rotax Max Challenge — Novice	Pino Kart	1st
2020	Minister of Culture, Sports and Tourism Cup KIC Kart Championship — Rotax Junior	Pino Kart	1st
2021	RMC Grand Finals — Junior Max	TRK Promotion	NC
2021	Minister of Culture, Sports and Tourism Cup KIC Kart Championship — Rotax Junior	Pino Kart	1st
2022	Minister of Culture, Sports and Tourism Cup KIC Kart Championship — Rotax Senior	Pino Kart	1st
2022	Karting Academy Trophy	Kim Taek Jun	37th
2023	IAME Winter Cup — X30 Senior	EGP Racing Team	NC
2023	Minister of Culture, Sports and Tourism Cup KIC Kart Championship — Rotax Senior	Pino Kart	1st
2023	IAME Euro Series — X30 Senior		118th
2023	Karting World Championship — OK	Leclerc by Lennox Racing	NC
2023	IAME Warriors Final — X30 Senior	EGP Racing Team	NC
2023	RMC Grand Finals — Senior Max	TRK Promotion	NC
2024	IAME Winter Cup — X30 Senior	EGP Racing Team	19th
2024	IAME Euro Series — X30 Senior	EGP Racing Team	14th
2024	IAME Series Benelux — X30 Senior	EGP Racing Team	12th
2024	FIA Motorsport Games Sprint Cup — Senior	Team South Korea	14th
2024	Karting World Cup — OK-N	Beyond Racing Team	1st
2024	Kartmasters British GP — X30 Senior		18th
2024	IAME Warriors Final — X30 Senior	EGP Racing Team	NC

== Racing record ==
=== Racing career summary ===
Season	Series	Team	Races	Wins	Poles	F/Laps	Podiums	Points	Position
2025	F4 Middle East Championship	Pinnacle Motorsport	6	0	0	0	0	4	20th
2025	Eurocup-4 Spanish Winter Championship	Rodin Motorsport	7	0	0	0	0	0	31st
2025	F4 Spanish Championship	Rodin Motorsport	18	0	0	0	0	1	22nd
2025	Formula 4 South East Asia Championship	Evans GP	3	0	0	0	3	58	10th
2025	FIA F4 World Cup		1	0	0	0	0	—N/a	DNF
2026	GB3 Championship	Elite Motorsport	23	0	0	0	0	229	10th
2026	Formula Regional European Championship	CL Motorsport	3	0	0	0	0	0	31st
2026–27	Asian Le Mans Cup – LMP3 Pro	R-ace GP							

* Season still in progress.

=== Complete F4 Middle East Championship results ===
(key) (Races in bold indicate pole position; races in italics indicate fastest lap)

Year	Team	1	2	3	4	5	6	7	8	9	10	11	12	13	14	15	DC	Points
2025	Pinnacle Motorsport	YMC1; 1; 19	YMC1; 2; 19	YMC1; 3; 9	YMC2; 1; 17	YMC2; 2; 15	YMC2; 3 Ret	DUB; 1	DUB; 2	DUB; 3	YMC3; 1	YMC3; 2	YMC3; 3	LSL; 1	LSL; 2	LSL; 3	20th	4

=== Complete Eurocup-4 Spanish Winter Championship results ===
(key) (Races in bold indicate pole position) (Races in italics indicate fastest lap)

Year	Team	1	2	3	4	5	6	7	8	9	DC	Points
2025	Rodin Motorsport	JER; 1; 15	JER; 2 DNS	JER; 3 DNS	POR; 1; 22	POR; 2 Ret	POR; 3; 35	NAV; 1; 22	NAV; 2; 28	NAV; 3 Ret	31st	0

=== Complete F4 Spanish Championship results ===
(key) (Races in bold indicate pole position; races in italics indicate fastest lap)

Year	Team	1	2	3	4	5	6	7	8	9	10	11	12	13	14	15	16	17	18	19	20	21	DC	Points
2025	Rodin Motorsport	ARA; 1; 24	ARA; 2; 27	ARA; 3; 18	NAV; 1; 25	NAV; 2; 23	NAV; 3; 10	POR; 1; 14	POR; 2; 31	POR; 3; 21	LEC; 1 Ret	LEC; 2; 22	LEC; 3; 12	JER; 1; 19	JER; 2; 23	JER; 3; 29	CRT; 1 Ret	CRT; 2; 30†	CRT; 3; 21	CAT; 1	CAT; 2	CAT; 3	22nd	1

=== Complete FIA F4 World Cup results ===
Year	Car	Qualifying	Quali Race	Main Race
2025	Mygale M21-F4	12th	6th	DNF

=== Complete GB3 Championship results ===
(key) (Races in bold indicate pole position) (Races in italics indicate fastest lap)

Year	Team	1	2	3	4	5	6	7	8	9	10	11	12	13	14	15	16	17	18	19	20	21	22	23	24	DC	Points
2026	Elite Motorsport	SIL1; 1; 7	SIL1; 2; 6	SIL1; 3; 9	SPA; 1 Ret	SPA; 2; 19	SPA; 3 C	HUN; 1; 6	HUN; 2; 5	HUN; 3 Ret	RBR; 1; 6	RBR; 2; 9	RBR; 3; 14	SIL2; 1; 11	SIL2; 2; 13	SIL2; 3; 11^{3}	DON; 1; 8	DON; 2; 10	DON; 3; 7	BRH; 1; 14	BRH; 2; 10	BRH; 3; 13^{3}	CAT; 1; 6	CAT; 2; 11	CAT; 3; 9^{4}	10th	229

* Season still in progress.

=== Complete Formula Regional European Championship results ===
(key) (Races in bold indicate pole position) (Races in italics indicate fastest lap)

Year	Team	1	2	3	4	5	6	7	8	9	10	11	12	13	14	15	16	17	18	19	20	DC	Points
2026	CL Motorsport	RBR; 1	RBR; 2	RBR; 3	ZAN; 1	ZAN; 2	SPA; 1	SPA; 2	SPA; 3	MNZ; 1; 16	MNZ; 2; 12	MNZ; 3; 24	HUN; 1	HUN; 2	LEC; 1	LEC; 2	IMO; 1	IMO; 2	IMO; 3	HOC; 1	HOC; 2	31st	0
