= 2024 F4 Chinese Championship =

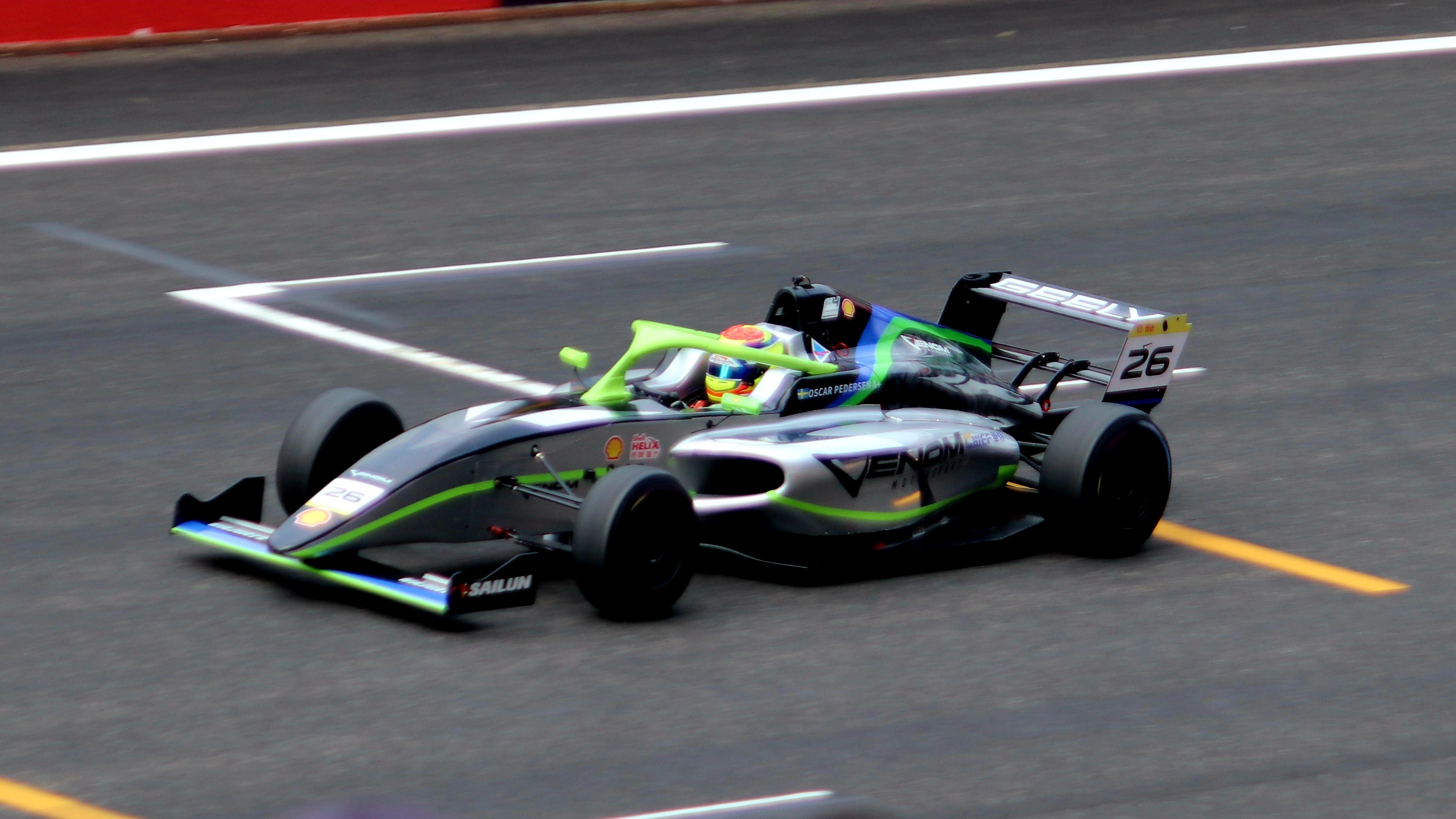
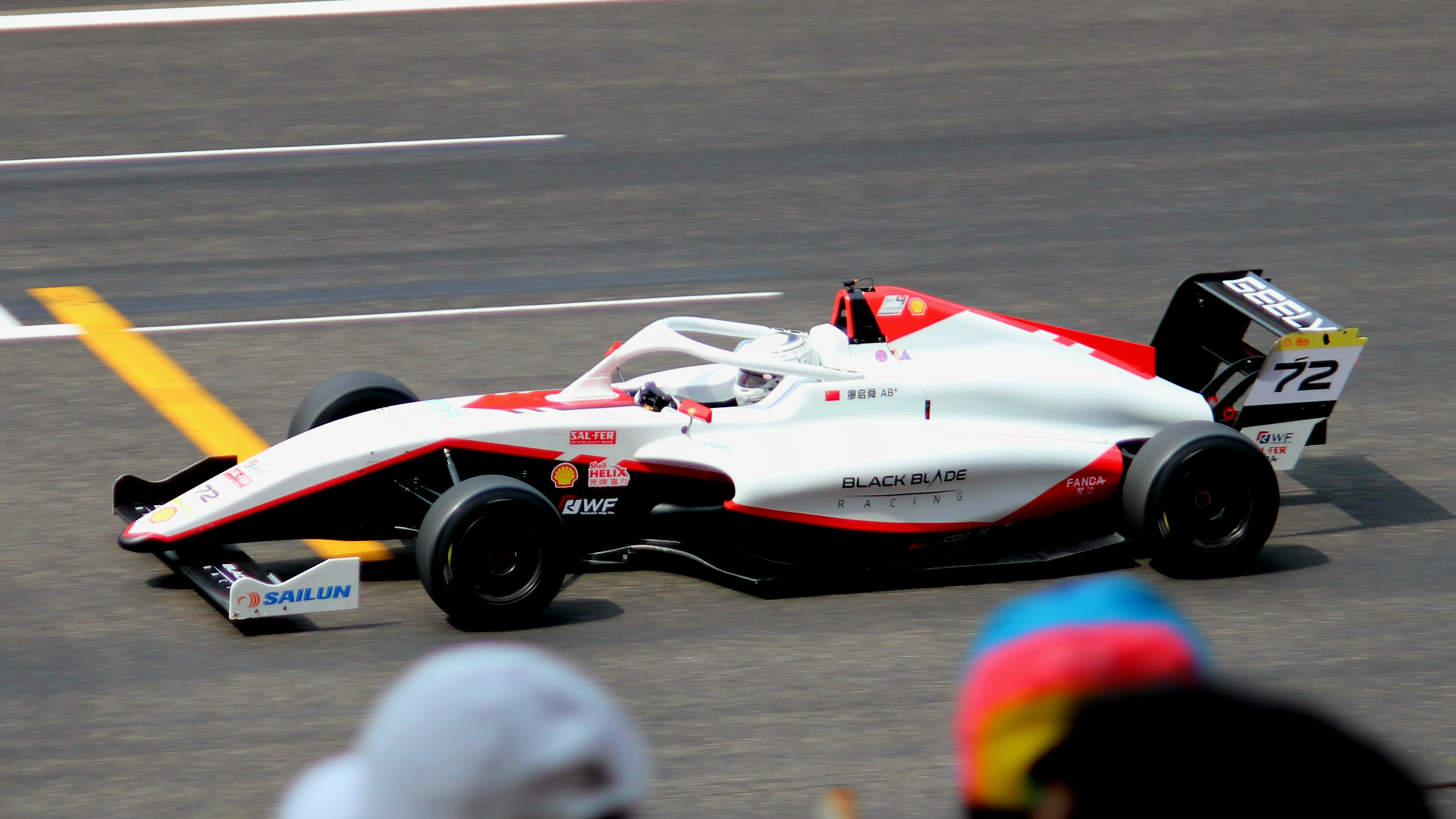
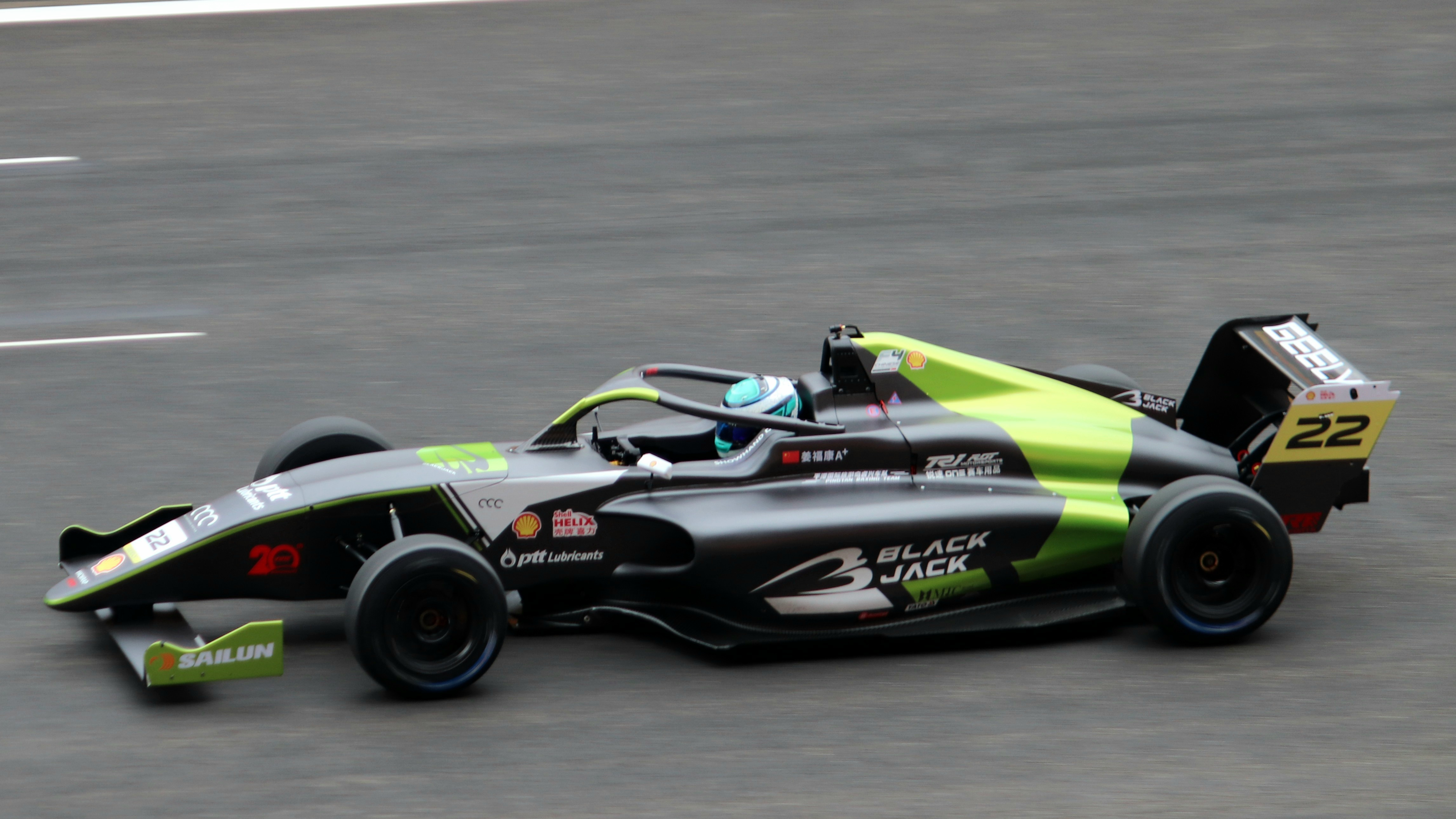
Oscar Pedersen won the Drivers' Championship for Venom Motorsport, Liu Kaishun ended the season runner-up and won Teams' Championship with Black Blade Racing, while Jiang Fukang finished third.

The 2024 F4 Chinese Championship (Shell Helix FIA F4 Chinese Championship) was the tenth season of the F4 Chinese Championship. It began on 19 April at Shanghai International Circuit and ended on 20 October at Zhuhai International Circuit.

The championship moved from Mygale's M14-F4 chassis to its successor, M21-F4.

== Teams and drivers ==
Teams	No.	Drivers	Status	Rounds
(China) Kai Fei Motorsport	2	(Hong Kong) Patrick Tsang	M	All
(China) Kai Fei Motorsport	7	(Hong Kong) Kenny Chung	M	All
(China) Champ Pro Racing	3	(Macau) Albert Cheung	M	1–2
(China) Champ Pro Racing	33	(Hong Kong) Andy Law	M	All
(China) Champ Pro Racing	38	(Macau) Victor Yung	M	5
(China) Black Blade Racing	5	(China) Cui Yuanpu		4
(China) Black Blade Racing	29	(China) Huang Xizheng		2
(China) Black Blade Racing	72	(Hong Kong) Liu Kaishun		All
(China) Black Blade Racing	99	(China) Yuhao Fu		1, 3, 5
(Hong Kong) Skyline T-1 Racing by Champ Motorsport	6	(Hong Kong) Hugo So		1
(Hong Kong) Skyline T-1 Racing by Champ Motorsport	9	(Hong Kong) Jacky Wong	M	1, 4–5
(China) Champ Motorsport	8	(Macau) Marcus Cheong		4
(China) Champ Motorsport	68	(China) Wang Yi		All
(China) Pointer Racing	10	(China) Shi Ke		2–4
(China) Pointer Racing	16	(China) Wu Chenjie		2–3
(China) Pointer Racing	55	(China) Wu Chenjie		1
(China) Pointer Racing	31	(China) Huang Weibo		4
(China) Pointer Racing	89	(China) Mi Qi		1
(China) PingTan Raxing Team by BlackJack	12	(Vietnam) Alex Sawer		1, 3
(China) PingTan Raxing Team by BlackJack	17	(China) Meng Cheng		5
(China) PingTan Raxing Team by BlackJack	22	(China) Jiang Fukang		All
(China) PingTan Raxing Team by BlackJack	28	(China) Lu Ye		2
(China) PingTan Raxing Team by BlackJack	83	(China) Fu Zhenjiang	M	4
(China) Venom Motorsport	15	(China) Wang Yuzhe		1–3, 5
(China) Venom Motorsport	26	(Sweden) Oscar Pedersen		All
(China) Venom Motorsport	88	(China) Shang Zongyi		4
(China) Geeke ACM Racing	18	(China) Shi Wei		1, 4
(China) Geeke ACM Racing	86	(China) Fei Jun	M	All
(China) Wolf.51GT3.COM	20	(China) Li Jia	M	All
(China) Venom Pole Motorsport	24	(China) Yang Peng		All
(China) Black Blade GP	25	(China) Zhang Jun		1, 3, 5
(China) Black Blade GP	57	(China) Wu Junwei	M	2
(China) Black Blade GP	66	(China) Liu Ruiqi		1
(China) Black Blade GP	99	(China) Yuhao Fu		4
(China) PingTan Raxing Team by ART	27	(China) Li Sicheng		1
(China) PingTan Raxing Team by ART	28	(China) Lu Ye		3–4
(China) PingTan Raxing Team by ART	36	(China) Yang Kaiwen		5
(China) PingTan Raxing Team by ART	67	(Chinese Taipei) Richard Lin	M	3
(China) PingTan Raxing Team by ART	98	(Russia) Viktor Turkin	M	5
(Chinese Taipei) Team KRC	30	(China) Jia Zhanbin		All
(Chinese Taipei) Team KRC	58	(Chinese Taipei) Ethan Ho		4–5
(Chinese Taipei) Team KRC	97	(China) Zeng Zilun		3
(China) Xiamen Pointer Racing	47	(China) Zhang Siqi		2
(China) Henmax Motorsport	11	(Hong Kong) Michael Wong	M	5
(China) Henmax Motorsport	48	(Hong Kong) James Wong	M	1–4
(China) Henmax Motorsport	61	(Hong Kong) Han Yingfu	M	All
(China) AdamCar Motorsport	56	(China) Jing Zefeng		1–2, 4–5
(China) Happiness Racing	77	(China) Zhu Zhenyu	M	1–2, 4

Icon	Class
M	Drivers that compete for the Masters Championship
G	Guest drivers ineligible for Drivers' Championship

== Race calendar and results ==
The provisional calendar released officially in March 2024 featured 5 rounds and 18 races and sees the return of the rounds held at Shanghai International Circuit. Moreover, an invitational round at the Guia Circuit as the support of the 71st Macau Grand Prix race was provisionally listed but in the end the competition wasn't included in the Grand Prix's schedule.

Round		Circuit	Date	Pole position	Fastest lap	Winning driver	Winning team	Master Class Winner	Supporting
1	R1	Shanghai International Circuit, Shanghai	20 April	(Vietnam) Alex Sawer	(Hong Kong) Liu Kaishun	(Vietnam) Alex Sawer	(China) PingTan Raxing Team by BlackJack	(China) Fei Jun	Formula One World Championship; Porsche Carrera Cup Asia
1	R2	Shanghai International Circuit, Shanghai	21 April		(Hong Kong) Liu Kaishun	(China) Jiang Fukang	(China) PingTan Raxing Team by BlackJack	(China) Li Jia	Formula One World Championship; Porsche Carrera Cup Asia
2	R3	Chengdu Tianfu International Circuit, Chengdu	25 May	(China) Huang Xizheng	(Sweden) Oscar Pedersen	(Sweden) Oscar Pedersen	(China) Venom Motorsport	(China) Fei Jun	China Endurance Championship; Geely Super Cup Pro
2	R4	Chengdu Tianfu International Circuit, Chengdu	25 May		(Sweden) Oscar Pedersen	(China) Jiang Fukang	(China) PingTan Raxing Team by BlackJack	(Hong Kong) Andy Law	China Endurance Championship; Geely Super Cup Pro
2	R5	Chengdu Tianfu International Circuit, Chengdu	26 May	(Sweden) Oscar Pedersen	(Sweden) Oscar Pedersen	(Sweden) Oscar Pedersen	(China) Venom Motorsport	(China) Li Jia	China Endurance Championship; Geely Super Cup Pro
2	R6	Chengdu Tianfu International Circuit, Chengdu	26 May		(China) Huang Xizheng	(Hong Kong) Liu Kaishun	(China) Black Blade Racing	(Hong Kong) Andy Law	China Endurance Championship; Geely Super Cup Pro
3	R7	Ningbo International Circuit, Ningbo	29 June	(Sweden) Oscar Pedersen	(Sweden) Oscar Pedersen	(Sweden) Oscar Pedersen	(China) Venom Motorsport	(China) Fei Jun	GT Sprint Challenge
3	R8	Ningbo International Circuit, Ningbo	29 June		(Hong Kong) Liu Kaishun	(Hong Kong) Liu Kaishun	(China) Black Blade Racing	(China) Fei Jun	GT Sprint Challenge
3	R9	Ningbo International Circuit, Ningbo	30 June	(China) Jiang Fukang	(Hong Kong) Liu Kaishun	(China) Jiang Fukang	(China) PingTan Raxing Team by BlackJack	(China) Fei Jun	GT Sprint Challenge
3	R10	Ningbo International Circuit, Ningbo	30 June		(Vietnam) Alex Sawer	(Vietnam) Alex Sawer	(China) PingTan Raxing Team by BlackJack	(China) Fei Jun	GT Sprint Challenge
4	R11	Shanghai International Circuit, Shanghai	14 September	(China) Cui Yuanpu	(China) Cui Yuanpu	(China) Cui Yuanpu	(China) Black Blade Racing	(China) Zhu Zhenyu	GT World Challenge Asia; Lamborghini Super Trofeo Asia
4	R12	Shanghai International Circuit, Shanghai	14 September		(China) Cui Yuanpu	(China) Jiang Fukang	(China) PingTan Raxing Team by BlackJack	(China) Zhu Zhenyu	GT World Challenge Asia; Lamborghini Super Trofeo Asia
4	R13	Shanghai International Circuit, Shanghai	15 September	(China) Cui Yuanpu	(China) Cui Yuanpu	(China) Cui Yuanpu	(China) Black Blade Racing	(China) Fei Jun	GT World Challenge Asia; Lamborghini Super Trofeo Asia
4	R14	Shanghai International Circuit, Shanghai	15 September		(Hong Kong) Liu Kaishun	(Hong Kong) Liu Kaishun	(China) Black Blade Racing	(China) Fei Jun	GT World Challenge Asia; Lamborghini Super Trofeo Asia
5	R15	Zhuhai International Circuit, Zhuhai	19 October	(Hong Kong) Liu Kaishun	(China) Yuhao Fu	(China) Yuhao Fu	(China) Black Blade Racing	(China) Fei Jun	GT Sprint Challenge; Hyundai N Cup
5	R16	Zhuhai International Circuit, Zhuhai	19 October		(Sweden) Oscar Pedersen	(Hong Kong) Liu Kaishun	(China) Black Blade Racing	(China) Fei Jun	GT Sprint Challenge; Hyundai N Cup
5	R17	Zhuhai International Circuit, Zhuhai	20 October	(Sweden) Oscar Pedersen	(Sweden) Oscar Pedersen	(Sweden) Oscar Pedersen	(China) Venom Motorsport	(China) Fei Jun	GT Sprint Challenge; Hyundai N Cup
5	R18	Zhuhai International Circuit, Zhuhai	20 October		(China) Yuhao Fu	(China) Yuhao Fu	(China) Black Blade Racing	(Hong Kong) Patrick Tsang	GT Sprint Challenge; Hyundai N Cup

== Championship standings ==
Position	**1st**	**2nd**	**3rd**	**4th**	**5th**	**6th**	**7th**	**8th**	**9th**	**10th**
Points	25	18	15	12	10	8	6	4	2	1

=== Drivers' Championship ===
Pos	Driver	SIC1		CTC				NIC				SIC2				ZIC				Pts
1	(Sweden) Oscar Pedersen	2	4	1	2	**1**	4	**1**	2	2	2	2	3	3	5	2	2	**1**	4	320
2	(Hong Kong) Liu Kaishun	3	2	3	4	3	1	2	1	3	Ret	7	2	2	1	**3**	1	2	2	301
3	(China) Jiang Fukang	4	1	4	1	4	3	3	3	**1**	Ret	8	1	4	10	4	13	4	3	237
4	(China) Yuhao Fu	20	Ret					5	Ret	5	Ret	3	Ret	8	3	1	4	3	1	131
5	(China) Wang Yuzhe	12	11	5	6	5	6	6	4	6	4					16	9	8	5	92
6	(China) Jia Zhanbin	9	9	6	5	6	5	7	8	Ret	5	6	9	14	Ret	8	5	Ret	10	85
7	(Vietnam) Alex Sawer	**1**	5					4	Ret	4	1									84
8	(China) Huang Xizheng			**2**	3	2	2													69
9	(Chinese Taipei) Ethan Ho											4	4	7	7	5	3	6	Ret	69
10	(China) Wang Yi	10	7	15	7	10	7	10	6	9	Ret	15	10	9	6	6	6	5	Ret	68
11	(China) Cui Yuanpu											**1**	23	**1**	4					62
12	(China) Shi Ke			Ret	8	7	8	Ret	7	8	6	5	5	5	17					62
13	(China) Jing Zefeng	7	6	Ret	9	9	9					11	6	10	2	9	8	9	7	61
14	(China) Fei Jun	8	Ret	8	Ret	WD	Ret	8	5	7	3	12	15	11	8	10	10	11	18	49
15	(China) Liu Ruiqi	5	3																	25
16	(China) Zhang Jun	26	13					WD	WD	WD	WD					7	7	7	9	20
17	(China) Huang Weibo											18	8	6	Ret					12
18	(China) Zhang Siqi			7	12	8	10													11
19	(China) Shi Wei	6	20									17	13	15	9					10
20	(China) Yang Kaiwen															Ret	Ret	10	6	9
21	(China) Shang Zongyi											9	7	12	11					8
22	(China) Lu Ye			13	13	17	16	Ret	10	13	7	16	16	17	15					7
23	(China) Li Jia	14	12	10	14	13	18	13	11	10	8	DNS	17	21	13	13	12	Ret	Ret	6
24	(Hong Kong) Patrick Tsang	16	21	12	18	Ret	15	12	14	16	DNS	Ret	DNS	DNS	Ret	Ret	DNS	13	8	4
25	(China) Li Sicheng	25	8																	4
26	(China) Yang Peng	15	16	14	10	11	11	9	Ret	15	12	23	Ret	18	14	Ret	Ret	15	13	3
27	(Hong Kong) Andy Law	19	19	9	11	14	13	17	12	18	DNS	14	18	19	Ret	Ret	Ret	12	11	2
28	(Hong Kong) James Wong	17	17	16	15	18	19	11	9	12	11	22	14	16	12					2
29	(Chinese Taipei) Richard Lin							Ret	Ret	Ret	9									2
30	(China) Wu Chenjie	23	22	11	16	12	12	18	13	11	10									1
31	(China) Zhu Zhenyu	11	14	18	Ret	15	Ret					10	11	Ret	Ret					1
32	(China) Mi Qi	Ret	10																	1
33	(China) Meng Cheng															12	11	17	Ret	0
34	(Hong Kong) Kenny Chung	18	18	17	17	19	17	15	15	17	14	20	19	22	21	11	15	Ret	16	0
35	(Macau) Marcus Cheong											13	12	13	16					0
36	(Macau) Victor Yung															18	16	16	12	0
37	(China) Zeng Zilun							14	Ret	14	13									0
38	(Hong Kong) Hugo So	13	15																	0
39	(Russia) Viktor Turkin															14	14	20	14	0
40	(Hong Kong) Michael Wong															15	17	14	Ret	0
41	(China) Wu Junwei			Ret	Ret	16	14													0
42	(Hong Kong) Han Yingfu	24	25	20	Ret	20	20	16	16	19	15	21	22	24	18	19	18	19	17	0
43	(Hong Kong) Jacky Wong	22	23									Ret	21	20	20	17	Ret	18	15	0
44	(China) Fu Zhenjiang											19	20	23	19					0
45	(Macau) Albert Cheung	21	24	19	Ret	WD	Ret													0
Pos	Driver	SIC1		CTC				NIC				SIC2				ZIC				Pts

Colour	Result
Gold	Winner
Silver	Second place
Bronze	Third place
Green	Points classification
Blue	Non-points classification
Blue	Non-classified finish (NC)
Purple	Retired, not classified (Ret)
Red	Did not qualify (DNQ)
Red	Did not pre-qualify (DNPQ)
Black	Disqualified (DSQ)
White	Did not start (DNS)
White	Withdrew (WD)
White	Race cancelled (C)
Blank	Did not practice (DNP)
Blank	Did not arrive (DNA)
Blank	Excluded (EX)

**Bold** – Pole
Italics – Fastest Lap
† — Did not finish, but classified
