= 2025 Formula 4 South East Asia Championship =

Motorsport season

The 2025 Formula 4 South East Asia Championship was the sixth season of the Formula 4 South East Asia Championship. The championship returned after a one-year break.

== Teams and drivers ==
Team	No.	Driver	Class	Rounds
(Australia) Evans GP	4	(South Korea) Kyuho Lee		4
(Australia) Evans GP	12	(Vietnam) Alex Sawer		All
(Australia) Evans GP	17	(China) Cheng Meng		1
(Australia) Evans GP	24	(Australia) Seth Gilmore		All
(Australia) Evans GP	56	(United States) Thomas Yu Lee	M	All
(Australia) Evans GP	68	(Singapore) Rafael Vaessen	R	5
(Hong Kong) BlackArts Racing Team	7	(Australia) Joshua Berry	R	All
(Hong Kong) BlackArts Racing Team	25	(India) Rishon Rajeev		1–4
(Hong Kong) BlackArts Racing Team	33	(Philippines) Iñigo Anton	R	All
(Hong Kong) BlackArts Racing Team	37	(Vietnam) Ben Anh Nguyễn	R	All
(Hong Kong) BlackArts Racing Team	88	(Malaysia) Putera Hani Imran	R	4–5
(Republic of Ireland) Pinnacle Motorsport	19	(Italy) Niccolò Maccagnani	R	4–5
(Republic of Ireland) Pinnacle Motorsport	67	(Singapore) Kareen Kaur	R	4
(China) Origine Motorsport	22	(China) Wang Zhongwei		1–4
(Thailand) Star Performance	44	(Thailand) Worapong Aiemwichan	R	2–4
(Thailand) Star Performance	51	(Thailand) Ayrton Asdathorn	R	2–3, 5

Icon	Legend
M	Drivers that compete for the Masters Championship
G	Guest drivers ineligible for Drivers' Championship
R	Rookie

== Race calendar and results ==
The schedule consisted of 14 races over 5 rounds.

Round		Circuit	Date	Pole position	Fastest lap	Winning driver	Winning team	Supporting
1	R1	(Malaysia) Sepang International Circuit, Sepang	3 May	(Vietnam) Alex Sawer	(Vietnam) Alex Sawer	(Vietnam) Alex Sawer	(Australia) Evans GP	Malaysia Touring Car Championship; Porsche Sprint Challenge Indonesia; Asia Classic Car Challenge
1	R2	(Malaysia) Sepang International Circuit, Sepang	4 May		(Vietnam) Alex Sawer	(Vietnam) Alex Sawer	(Australia) Evans GP	Malaysia Touring Car Championship; Porsche Sprint Challenge Indonesia; Asia Classic Car Challenge
1	R3	(Malaysia) Sepang International Circuit, Sepang	4 May	(Vietnam) Alex Sawer	(Vietnam) Alex Sawer	(Vietnam) Alex Sawer	(Australia) Evans GP	Malaysia Touring Car Championship; Porsche Sprint Challenge Indonesia; Asia Classic Car Challenge
2	R1	(Thailand) Buriram International Circuit, Buriram	24 May	(Vietnam) Alex Sawer	(Vietnam) Alex Sawer	(Vietnam) Alex Sawer	(Australia) Evans GP	Thailand Super Series; TSS The Super Series
2	R2	(Thailand) Buriram International Circuit, Buriram	24 May		(Vietnam) Alex Sawer	(Vietnam) Alex Sawer	(Australia) Evans GP	Thailand Super Series; TSS The Super Series
2	R3	(Thailand) Buriram International Circuit, Buriram	25 May	(Vietnam) Alex Sawer	(Vietnam) Alex Sawer	(Vietnam) Alex Sawer	(Australia) Evans GP	Thailand Super Series; TSS The Super Series
3	R1	(Thailand) Bangsaen Street Circuit, Mueang Chonburi	5 July	(Vietnam) Alex Sawer (Note: Asdathorn set the fastest lap time in the qualifying session but was given a one-place grid penalty for not following the race director's instructions. Sawer inherited the pole position.)	(Thailand) Ayrton Asdathorn	(Australia) Seth Gilmore (Note: Asdathorn finished first on the track but was given a five-seconds penalty. Gilmore inherited the win.)	(Australia) Evans GP	Porsche Carrera Cup Asia; Thailand Super Series; TSS The Super Series
3	R2	(Thailand) Bangsaen Street Circuit, Mueang Chonburi	6 July	(Thailand) Ayrton Asdathorn	(Vietnam) Alex Sawer	(Vietnam) Alex Sawer	(Australia) Evans GP	Porsche Carrera Cup Asia; Thailand Super Series; TSS The Super Series
4	R1	(Malaysia) Sepang International Circuit, Sepang	6 September	(Italy) Niccolò Maccagnani	(Vietnam) Alex Sawer	(Vietnam) Alex Sawer	(Australia) Evans GP	Malaysia Touring Car Championship; Lamborghini Super Trofeo Asia; Asia Classic Car Challenge
4	R2	(Malaysia) Sepang International Circuit, Sepang	7 September		(Australia) Seth Gilmore	(Australia) Seth Gilmore	(Australia) Evans GP	Malaysia Touring Car Championship; Lamborghini Super Trofeo Asia; Asia Classic Car Challenge
4	R3	(Malaysia) Sepang International Circuit, Sepang	7 September	(Vietnam) Alex Sawer	(Vietnam) Alex Sawer	(Vietnam) Alex Sawer	(Australia) Evans GP	Malaysia Touring Car Championship; Lamborghini Super Trofeo Asia; Asia Classic Car Challenge
5	R1	(Malaysia) Sepang International Circuit, Sepang	20 September	(Italy) Niccolò Maccagnani	(Italy) Niccolò Maccagnani	(Italy) Niccolò Maccagnani	(Republic of Ireland) Pinnacle Motorsport	TSS The Super Series; GR86 Cup Malaysia Series
5	R2	(Malaysia) Sepang International Circuit, Sepang	21 September		(Italy) Niccolò Maccagnani	(Italy) Niccolò Maccagnani	(Republic of Ireland) Pinnacle Motorsport	TSS The Super Series; GR86 Cup Malaysia Series
5	R3	(Malaysia) Sepang International Circuit, Sepang	21 September	(Italy) Niccolò Maccagnani	(Italy) Niccolò Maccagnani	(Italy) Niccolò Maccagnani	(Republic of Ireland) Pinnacle Motorsport	TSS The Super Series; GR86 Cup Malaysia Series

== Championship standings ==
The championship's scoring system was overhauled in 2025. Points were awarded to the top twelve classified drivers, while two further points were awarded for taking a pole position in qualifying.

Position	**1st**	**2nd**	**3rd**	**4th**	**5th**	**6th**	**7th**	**8th**	**9th**	**10th**	**11th**	**12th**	Pole
Points	30	22	18	15	12	10	8	6	4	3	2	1	2

=== Drivers' championship ===
Pos	Driver	SEP1 (Malaysia)			BUR (Thailand)			BAN (Thailand)		SEP2 (Malaysia)			SEP3 (Malaysia)			Pts
Pos	Driver	R1	R2	R3	R1	R2	R3	R1	R2	R1	R2	R3	R1	R2	R3	Pts
1	(Vietnam) Alex Sawer	**1**	1	**1**	**1**	1	**1**	**Ret**	1	1	4	**1**	2	3	2	359
2	(Australia) Seth Gilmore	2	6	3	2	3	3	1	7†	5	1	4	3	2	3	261
3	(Philippines) Iñigo Anton	3	DSQ	4	4	2	4	3	4	4	6	5	5	4	WD	182
4	(Italy) Niccolò Maccagnani									**2**	3	2	**1**	1	**1**	158
5	(India) Rishon Rajeev	7	2	2	6	5	6	2	3	6	5	6				156
6	(Thailand) Ayrton Asdathorn				3	4	2	4	**2**				4	5	4	136
7	(Vietnam) Ben Anh Nguyễn	6	3	9	Ret	9	8	5	9†	10	8	7	8	9	7	93
8	(China) Wang Zhongwei	4	Ret	5	7	6	5	7	5	9	7	9				93
9	(United States) Thomas Lee	8	5	7	5	7	7	6	6	7	DSQ	10	9	Ret	9	93
10	(South Korea) Kyuho Lee									3	2	3				58
11	(Australia) Joshua Berry	Ret	DSQ	6	8	8	10	WD	WD	12	12	12	10	8	6	47
12	(Malaysia) Putera Hani Imran									8	9	8	6	7	8	40
13	(China) Cheng Meng	5	4	8												33
14	(Singapore) Rafael Vaessen												7	6	5	30
15	(Thailand) Worapong Aiemwichan				9	10	9	8†	8	13	11	13				25
16	(Singapore) Kareen Kaur									11	10	11				7
Pos	Driver	R1	R2	R3	R1	R2	R3	R1	R2	R1	R2	R3	R1	R2	R3	Pts
Pos	Driver	SEP1 (Malaysia)			BUR (Thailand)			BAN (Thailand)		SEP2 (Malaysia)			SEP3 (Malaysia)			Pts

Colour	Result
Gold	Winner
Silver	Second place
Bronze	Third place
Green	Points classification
Blue	Non-points classification
Blue	Non-classified finish (NC)
Purple	Retired, not classified (Ret)
Red	Did not qualify (DNQ)
Red	Did not pre-qualify (DNPQ)
Black	Disqualified (DSQ)
White	Did not start (DNS)
White	Withdrew (WD)
White	Race cancelled (C)
Blank	Did not practice (DNP)
Blank	Did not arrive (DNA)
Blank	Excluded (EX)

**Bold** – Pole
Italics – Fastest Lap
† — Did not finish, but classified

=== Rookies' championship ===
Pos	Driver	SEP1 (Malaysia)			BUR (Thailand)			BAN (Thailand)		SEP2 (Malaysia)			SEP3 (Malaysia)			Pts
Pos	Driver	R1	R2	R3	R1	R2	R3	R1	R2	R1	R2	R3	R1	R2	R3	Pts
1	(Philippines) Iñigo Anton	**1**	DSQ	**1**	2	1	2	1	2	2	2	2	3	2	WD	296
2	(Vietnam) Ben Anh Nguyễn	2	1	3	Ret	4	3	3	4†	4	3	3	6	7	5	217
3	(Thailand) Ayrton Asdathorn				**1**	2	**1**	**2**	**1**				2	3	2	204
4	(Italy) Niccolò Maccagnani									**1**	1	**1**	**1**	1	**1**	188
5	(Australia) Joshua Berry	Ret	DSQ	2	3	3	5	WD	WD	6	7	6	7	6	4	131
6	(Thailand) Worapong Aiemwichan				4	5	4	4	3	7	6	7				101
7	(Malaysia) Putera Hani Imran									3	4	4	4	5	6	85
8	(Singapore) Rafael Vaessen												5	4	3	45
9	(Singapore) Kareen Kaur									5	5	5				36
Pos	Driver	R1	R2	R3	R1	R2	R3	R1	R2	R1	R2	R3	R1	R2	R3	Pts
Pos	Driver	SEP1 (Malaysia)			BUR (Thailand)			BAN (Thailand)		SEP2 (Malaysia)			SEP3 (Malaysia)			Pts

=== Teams' Championship ===
Ahead of each event, the teams nominated two drivers that accumulated teams' points.

Pos	Driver	SEP1 (Malaysia)			BUR (Thailand)			BAN (Thailand)		SEP2 (Malaysia)			SEP3 (Malaysia)			Pts
Pos	Driver	R1	R2	R3	R1	R2	R3	R1	R2	R1	R2	R3	R1	R2	R3	Pts
1	(Australia) Evans GP	1	1	1	1	1	1	1	1	1	2	1	2	2	2	609
1	(Australia) Evans GP	2	6	3	2	3	3	Ret	7†	3	4	3	3	3	3	609
2	(Hong Kong) BlackArts Racing Team	3	2	2	4	2	4	2	3	4	5	5	5	4	7	356
2	(Hong Kong) BlackArts Racing Team	7	DSQ	4	6	5	6	3	4	6	6	6	8	9	DNS	356
3	(Republic of Ireland) Pinnacle Motorsport									2	3	2	1	1	1	159
3	(Republic of Ireland) Pinnacle Motorsport									11	10	11				159
4	(Thailand) Star Performance				3	4	2	4	2	13	11	13	4	5	4	159
4	(Thailand) Star Performance				9	10	9	8†	8							159
5	(China) Origine Motorsport	4	Ret	5	7	6	5	7	5	9	7	9				93
6	(Hong Kong) BlackArts Racing Academy									8	9	8				16
Pos	Driver	R1	R2	R3	R1	R2	R3	R1	R2	R1	R2	R3	R1	R2	R3	Pts
Pos	Driver	SEP1 (Malaysia)			BUR (Thailand)			BAN (Thailand)		SEP2 (Malaysia)			SEP3 (Malaysia)			Pts
