= 2023 Formula Regional Asian Championship =

Motor racing competition

The 2023 Formula Regional Asian Championship was to be a multi-event, Formula Regional open-wheel single seater motor racing championship. The championship would have featured a mix of professional and amateur drivers, competing in Formula Regional cars. It would have been the sixth season of the championship, and the second season under the Formula Regional moniker, after a rebrand happened due to the FIA ending the F3 category name.

After the season was originally scheduled to be held in January and February of the year in the Middle East, this schedule then became the first season of the newly founded Formula Regional Middle East Championship. The Asian championship was then scheduled to be held from October to December of 2023. However, only one driver was announced to be competing, with no further communication by the series itself through all the scheduled rounds.

== Announced teams and drivers ==
Team	Driver	Status
(Australia) Evans GP	(Australia) Costa Toparis	

== Race calendar ==
After a few years of disruption because of the COVID-19 pandemic, the championship was supposed to return its traditional pre-COVID South East Asian region. The 2023 calendar was never officially confirmed by the series and none of the rounds happened.

Round		Circuit	Date	Map of circuit locations
-	~~R1~~	(China) Zhuzhou International Circuit, Zhuzhou	~~27–29 October~~	2023 Formula Regional Asian Championship is located in Southeast Asia
-	~~R2~~	(China) Zhuzhou International Circuit, Zhuzhou	~~27–29 October~~	2023 Formula Regional Asian Championship is located in Southeast Asia
-	~~R3~~	(China) Zhuzhou International Circuit, Zhuzhou	~~27–29 October~~	2023 Formula Regional Asian Championship is located in Southeast Asia
-	~~R1~~	(Malaysia) Sepang International Circuit, Sepang	~~24–26 November~~	2023 Formula Regional Asian Championship is located in Southeast Asia
-	~~R2~~	(Malaysia) Sepang International Circuit, Sepang	~~24–26 November~~	2023 Formula Regional Asian Championship is located in Southeast Asia
-	~~R3~~	(Malaysia) Sepang International Circuit, Sepang	~~24–26 November~~	2023 Formula Regional Asian Championship is located in Southeast Asia
-	~~R1~~	(Malaysia) Sepang International Circuit, Sepang	~~1–3 December~~	2023 Formula Regional Asian Championship is located in Southeast Asia
-	~~R2~~	(Malaysia) Sepang International Circuit, Sepang	~~1–3 December~~	2023 Formula Regional Asian Championship is located in Southeast Asia
-	~~R3~~	(Malaysia) Sepang International Circuit, Sepang	~~1–3 December~~	2023 Formula Regional Asian Championship is located in Southeast Asia
