= Evans GP =

Motorsport team from Australia

(Australia) Evans GP
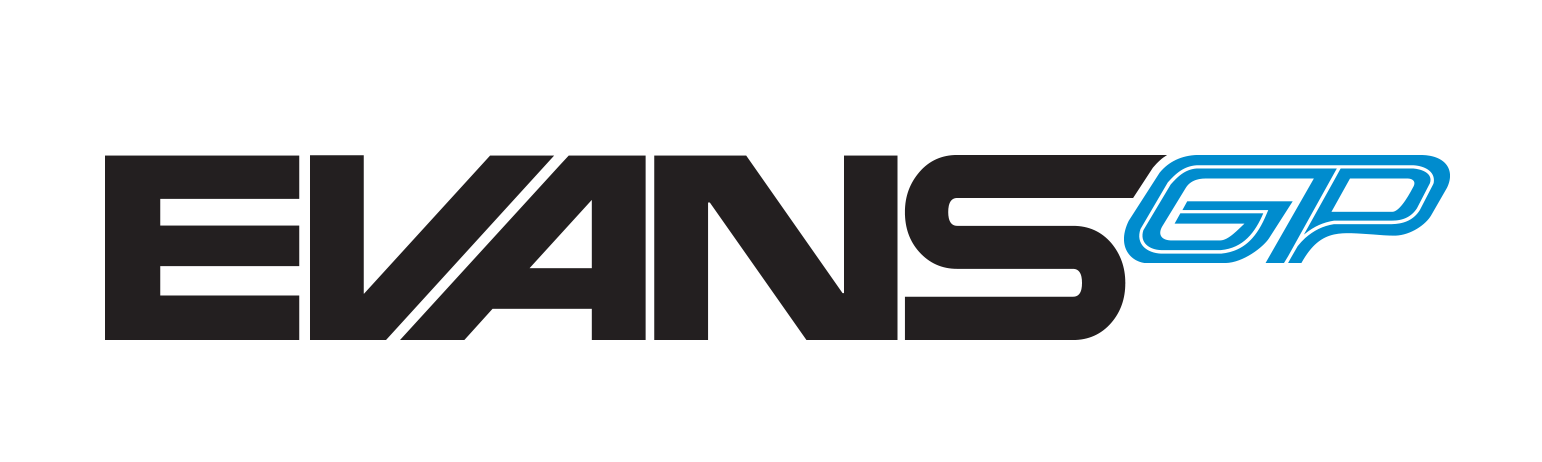
- Founded: 2020
- Base: United Kingdom; Malaysia
- Founder(s): Joshua Evans
- Current series: GB4 Championship; Formula Regional Middle East Championship; Formula 4 Australian Championship; FIA Formula Regional World Cup
- Current drivers: GB4 Championship (India) 8. Kai Daryanani (Australia) 37. Cooper Webster (Taiwan) 56. Thomas Lee; Formula 4 Australian Championship (Macau) 3. Tiago Rodrigues (India) 8. Kai Daryanani (Australia) 37. Cooper Webster; FIA Formula Regional World Cup (Macau) 33. Tiago Rodrigues (Australia) 37. Cooper Webster (United Kingdom) 88. Kai Daryanani
- Website: evansgp.com

Evans GP is an Australian motor racing team formed in 2020 by Joshua Evans. The team started racing in the 2021 F3 Asian Championship and has since competed in the Formula Regional Asian Championship and the GB4 Championship. It will enter the Formula Regional Middle East Championship in 2024.

In 2023, Evans and British racing driver Dan Wells launched DW Evans GT, a GT racing team which currently competes in the Lamborghini Super Trofeo Asia.

== History ==
Before founding Evans GP in 2020, Evans had worked for a number of successful motor racing teams. He worked for Sonic Motor Racing Services when they won the Australian Formula Ford Championship with David Reynolds in 2004 and Tim Blanchard in 2007, before then becoming General Manager and Chief Engineer of BlackArts Racing Team. In his time with BlackArts Racing, Evans won 16 championships, including Chinese F4, Asian Formula Renault - and most recently, the 2019-20 F3 Asian Championship with Joey Alders.

Evans GP made its debut in the 2021 F3 Asian Championship. It achieved second place in the Teams’ Championship, ahead of rivals such as the Mumbai Falcons (who were supported by Prema Racing), Pinnacle Motorsport, and Hitech Grand Prix. Drivers Isack Hadjar and Patrik Pasma would go on to compete in the 2021 Formula Regional European Championship by Alpine (FRECA), with Hadjar finishing the year as rookie champion.

Evans GP competed in the rebranded Formula Regional Asian Championship in 2022, where they took a race win with Patrik Pasma in the fourth round of the season at Dubai Autodrome. In January 2023, the team sold their Asian operations to Dutch motor racing team MP Motorsport ahead of the Australian team's move to the United Kingdom. Evans became the team manager of the MP Motorsport by Hyderabad Blackbirds team in the 2023 Formula Regional Middle East Championship (FRMEC), which placed third overall - with drivers Mari Boya and Sami Meguetonif achieving race wins.

The team entered the 2023 GB4 Championship with Red Bull Racing Esports and S5000 driver Cooper Webster, British F4 driver Kai Daryanani, and Taiwanese racing driver Thomas Lee. Later that year, Evans GP announced their return to Asian motorsports. The team will fielded entries in the 2023 Formula Regional Asian Championship and 2024 Formula Regional Middle East Championship. The team also provided technical support to the KIC Motorsport entries of Costa Toparis and Alex Sawer in the 2024 Formula Regional European Championship.

=== DW Evans GT ===
(Australia) (Hong Kong) DW Evans GT
- Founded: 2023
- Founder(s): Joshua Evans; Dan Wells
- Current drivers: Lamborghini Super Trofeo Asia; 21. (Hong Kong) Dan Wells (Taiwan) Oscar Lee
- Website: dwevansgt.com

In 2023, Evans and British racing driver Dan Wells formed a GT racing team, DW Evans GT. The team currently competes in the Lamborghini Super Trofeo Asia with a lineup of Wells and Taiwanese racing driver Oscar Lee, where they won the Pro-Am championship with one round to spare.

== Current series results ==
=== Formula Regional Middle East Championship ===
| Year | Car | Drivers | Races | Wins | Poles | F/Laps | Podiums | Points | D.C. | T.C. |
|---|---|---|---|---|---|---|---|---|---|---|
| 2024 | Tatuus F3 T-318 | (Australia) Costa Toparis | 15 | 0 | 0 | 0 | 1 | 21 | 14th | 7th |
| 2024 | Tatuus F3 T-318 | (United Kingdom) John Bennett | 14 | 0 | 0 | 0 | 0 | 1 | 23rd | 7th |
| 2024 | Tatuus F3 T-318 | (France) Edgar Pierre | 6 | 0 | 0 | 0 | 0 | 0 | 32nd | 7th |
| 2025 | Tatuus F3 T-318 | (Australia) Aaron Cameron | 11 | 0 | 0 | 0 | 0 | 8 | 18th | 7th |
| 2025 | Tatuus F3 T-318 | (Italy) Matteo de Palo | 6 | 0 | 0 | 0 | 0 | 4 | 19th | 7th |
| 2025 | Tatuus F3 T-318 | (United Kingdom) Kai Daryanani | 15 | 0 | 0 | 0 | 0 | 2 | 22nd | 7th |
| 2025 | Tatuus F3 T-318 | (Vietnam) Alex Sawer | 9 | 0 | 0 | 0 | 0 | 1 | 24th | 7th |

=== Formula Trophy UAE ===
| Year | Car | Drivers | Races | Wins | Poles | F/Laps | Podiums | Points | D.C. | T.C. |
|---|---|---|---|---|---|---|---|---|---|---|
| 2024 | Tatuus F4-T421 | (India) Kai Daryanani | 7 | 1 | 0 | 0 | 4 | 102 | 1st | 2nd |
| 2024 | Tatuus F4-T421 | (Netherlands) Reno Francot | 2 | 0 | 0 | 1 | 2 | 33 | 10th | 2nd |
| 2024 | Tatuus F4-T421 | (Canada) Alexander Berg | 2 | 0 | 0 | 0 | 0 | 0 | 18th | 2nd |
| 2024 | Tatuus F4-T421 | (Australia) Seth Gilmore | 5 | 0 | 0 | 0 | 0 | 0 | 19th | 2nd |
| 2025 | Tatuus F4-T421 | (Australia) Hunter Salvatore | | | | | | | | |
| 2025 | Tatuus F4-T421 | (Singapore) Rafael Vaessen | | | | | | | | |
| 2025 | Tatuus F4-T421 | (Vietnam) Ben Anh Nguyễn | | | | | | | | |
| 2025 | Tatuus F4-T421 | (United Arab Emirates) Lucas Pasquinetti | | | | | | | | |
| 2025 | Tatuus F4-T421 | (Netherlands) Kasper Schormans | | | | | | | | |

=== F4 Middle East Championship / UAE4 Series ===
| Year | Car | Drivers | Races | Wins | Poles | F/Laps | Podiums | Points | D.C. | T.C. |
|---|---|---|---|---|---|---|---|---|---|---|
| 2025 | Tatuus F4-T421 | (Hungary) Martin Molnár | 15 | 0 | 0 | 0 | 0 | 42 | 13th | 6th |
| 2025 | Tatuus F4-T421 | (Macau) Tiago Rodrigues | 15 | 0 | 0 | 0 | 0 | 29 | 14th | 6th |
| 2025 | Tatuus F4-T421 | (Australia) Seth Gilmore | 12 | 0 | 0 | 0 | 0 | 0 | 25th | 6th |
| 2025 | Tatuus F4-T421 | (Saudi Arabia) Farah Al Yousef | 15 | 0 | 0 | 0 | 0 | 0 | 30th | 6th |
| 2026 | Tatuus F4-T421 | (Netherlands) Kasper Schormans | 3 | 0 | 0 | 0 | 0 | 6 | 20th | 10th |
| 2026 | Tatuus F4-T421 | (Denmark) Alba Hurup Larsen | 9 | 0 | 0 | 0 | 0 | 1 | 22nd | 10th |
| 2026 | Tatuus F4-T421 | (United Kingdom) Thomas Ingram Hill | 12 | 0 | 0 | 0 | 0 | 0 | 25th | 10th |
| 2026 | Tatuus F4-T421 | (Singapore) Rafael Vaessen | 5 | 0 | 0 | 0 | 0 | 0 | 35th | 10th |
| 2026 | Tatuus F4-T421 | (Vietnam) Ben Anh Nguyen | 6 | 0 | 0 | 0 | 0 | 0 | 43rd | 10th |

=== Formula 4 South East Asia Championship ===
| Year | Car | Drivers | Races | Wins | Poles | F/Laps | Podiums | Points | D.C. | T.C. |
|---|---|---|---|---|---|---|---|---|---|---|
| 2025 | Tatuus F4-T421 | (Vietnam) Alex Sawer | 14 | 9 | 6 | 9 | 12 | 359 | 1st | 1st |
| 2025 | Tatuus F4-T421 | (Australia) Seth Gilmore | 14 | 2 | 0 | 1 | 10 | 261 | 2nd | 1st |
| 2025 | Tatuus F4-T421 | (United States) Thomas Lee | 14 | 0 | 0 | 0 | 0 | 93 | 9th | 1st |
| 2025 | Tatuus F4-T421 | (South Korea) Kyuho Lee | 3 | 0 | 0 | 0 | 3 | 58 | 10th | 1st |
| 2025 | Tatuus F4-T421 | (China) Cheng Meng | 3 | 0 | 0 | 0 | 0 | 33 | 13th | 1st |
| 2025 | Tatuus F4-T421 | (Singapore) Rafael Vaessen | 3 | 0 | 0 | 0 | 0 | 30 | 14th | 1st |
| 2025 | Tatuus F4-T421 | (Thailand) Ayrton Asdathorn | 8 | 0 | 1 | 1 | 3 | 136 | 6th | 4th (Note: Entered as Star Performance) |
| 2025 | Tatuus F4-T421 | (Thailand) Worapong Aiemwichan | 8 | 0 | 0 | 0 | 0 | 25 | 15th | 4th |

== Former series results ==
=== F3 Asian Championship / Formula Regional Asian Championship ===
| Year | Car | Drivers | Races | Wins | Poles | F/Laps | Podiums | Points | D.C. | T.C. |
|---|---|---|---|---|---|---|---|---|---|---|
| 2021 | Tatuus F3 T-318 | (Finland) Patrik Pasma | 15 | 2 | 0 | 1 | 5 | 146 | 4th | 2nd |
| 2021 | Tatuus F3 T-318 | (France) Isack Hadjar | 9 | 0 | 0 | 1 | 5 | 95 | 6th | 2nd |
| 2021 | Tatuus F3 T-318 | (United Kingdom) Alex Connor | 6 | 0 | 0 | 0 | 0 | 8 | 16th | 2nd |
| 2021 | Tatuus F3 T-318 | (Russia) Irina Sidorkova | 12 | 0 | 0 | 0 | 0 | 0 | 22nd | 2nd |
| 2021 | Tatuus F3 T-318 | (United Kingdom) Casper Stevenson | 6 | 0 | 0 | 0 | 0 | 0 | 23rd | 2nd |
| 2022 | Tatuus F3 T-318 | (Finland) Patrik Pasma | 9 | 1 | 0 | 0 | 1 | 63 | 11th | 6th |
| 2022 | Tatuus F3 T-318 | (Russia) Michael Belov | 9 | 0 | 0 | 0 | 1 | 55 | 12th | 6th |
| 2022 | Tatuus F3 T-318 | (United Kingdom) Frederick Lubin | 9 | 0 | 0 | 0 | 0 | 10 | 19th | 6th |
| 2022 | Tatuus F3 T-318 | (France) Sami Meguetounif | 3 | 0 | 0 | 0 | 0 | 6 | 20th | 6th |
| 2022 | Tatuus F3 T-318 | (Italy) Nicola Marinangeli | 15 | 0 | 0 | 0 | 0 | 1 | 24th | 6th |
| 2022 | Tatuus F3 T-318 | (Turkey) Cem Bölükbaşı | 3 | 0 | 0 | 0 | 0 | 0 | NC | 6th |
| 2022 | Tatuus F3 T-318 | (Hungary) Levente Révész | 15 | 0 | 0 | 0 | 0 | 2 | 23rd | 8th (Note: Entered as Evans GP Academy) |
| 2022 | Tatuus F3 T-318 | (United States) David Morales | 15 | 0 | 0 | 0 | 0 | 0 | 33rd | 8th |

=== GB4 Championship ===
| Year | Car | Drivers | Races | Wins | Poles | F/Laps | Podiums | Points | D.C. | T.C. |
|---|---|---|---|---|---|---|---|---|---|---|
| 2023 | Tatuus F4-T014 | (Australia) Cooper Webster | 20 | 5 | 4 | 6 | 15 | 494 | 2nd | 3rd |
| 2023 | Tatuus F4-T014 | (United States) Thomas Lee | 18 | 0 | 0 | 0 | 0 | 113 | 14th | 3rd |
| 2023 | Tatuus F4-T014 | (India) Kai Daryanani | 6 | 1 | 0 | 0 | 1 | 61 | 18th | 3rd |

=== Formula 4 Australian Championship ===
| Year | Car | Drivers | Races | Wins | Poles | F/Laps | Podiums | Points | D.C. | T.C. |
|---|---|---|---|---|---|---|---|---|---|---|
| 2024 | Tatuus F4-T421 | (Australia) Cooper Webster | 3 | 1 | 0 | 0 | 3 | 58 | 7th | N/A |
| 2024 | Tatuus F4-T421 | (United Kingdom) Kai Daryanani | 3 | 1 | 1 | 1 | 2 | 50 | 8th | N/A |
| 2024 | Tatuus F4-T421 | (Macau) Tiago Rodrigues | 3 | 1 | 1 | 2 | 1 | 38 | 11th | N/A |

== Timeline ==
Current series
| Lamborghini Super Trofeo Asia | 2023–present |
| Formula Trophy UAE | 2024–present |
| UAE4 Series | 2025–present |
| Formula 4 South East Asia Championship | 2025–present |
Former series
| Formula Regional Asian Championship | 2021–2022 |
| GB4 Championship | 2023 |
| Formula Regional European Championship | 2024 |
| Formula 4 Australian Championship | 2024 |
| Formula Regional Middle East Championship | 2024–2025 |
