= Chengdu Tianfu International Circuit =

Motorsport circuit in China

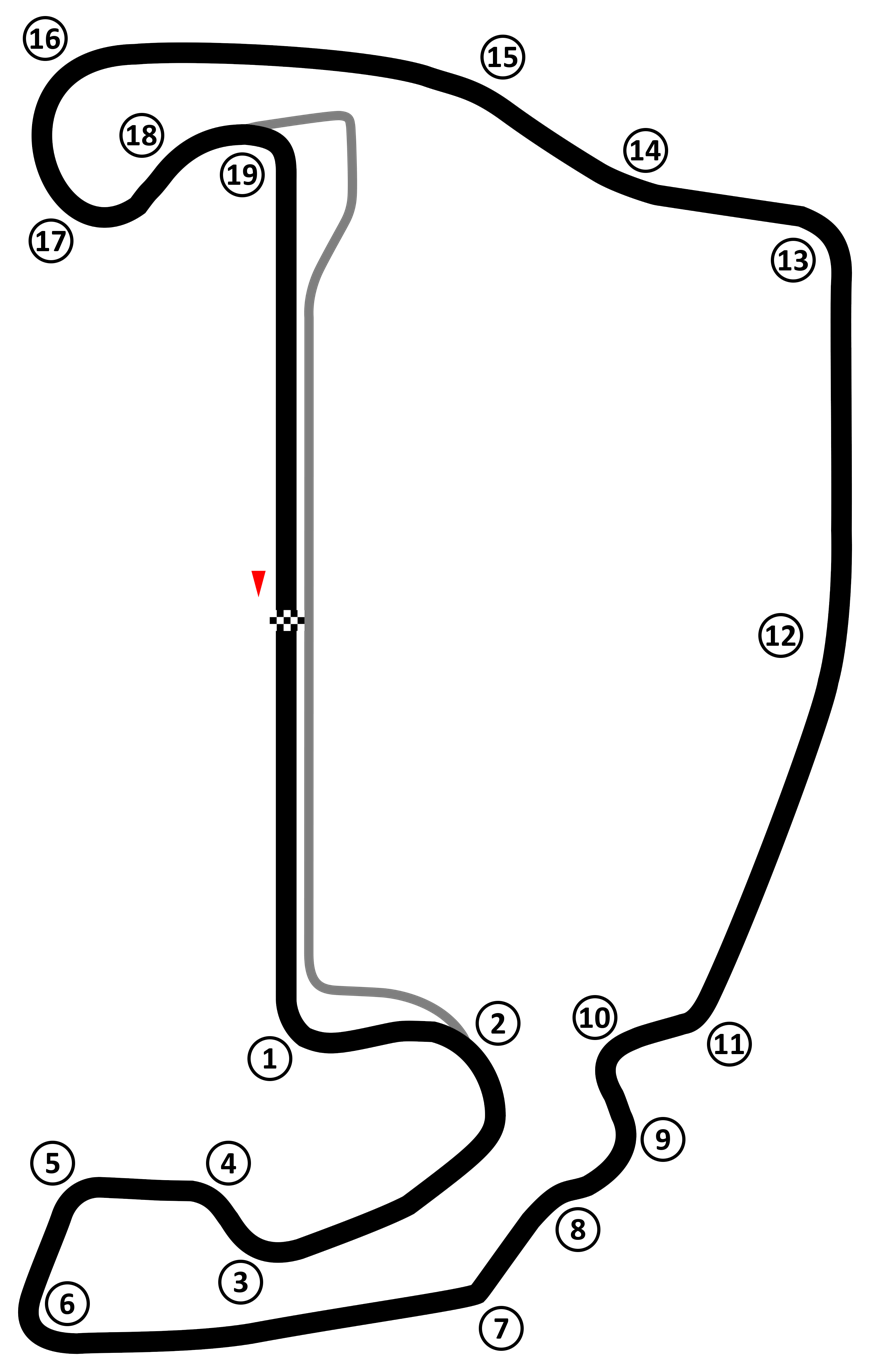
- West Circuit (2023–present)
- Location: Tianfu New Area, Chengdu, Sichuan, China
- Coordinates: 30°29′37.48″N 104°26′2.93″E
- FIA Grade: 2
- Broke ground: 2022
- Opened: 1 December 2023; 2 years ago
- Major events: Current: TCR World Tour (2026); TCR Asia (2026); TCR China (2026); F4 China (2024–present)

West Circuit (2023–present)
- Surface: Asphalt
- Length: 3.265 km (2.029 mi)
- Turns: 19
- Race lap record: 1:21.413 ( (Sweden) Oscar Pedersen, Mygale M21-F4, 2024, F4)

The Chengdu Tianfu International Circuit is a 3.265 km (2.029 mi) motorsport circuit located in the Tianfu New Area of Chengdu, Sichuan, China. It opened in 2023 as a replacement of the Chengdu Goldenport Circuit, which was active from 2007 to 2019.

== History ==
The Chengdu Tianfu International Circuit was developed by the Mitime subsidiary of automotive conglomerate Geely. It opened in December 2023 when it hosted the season finale of the China Endurance Championship. The circuit is homologated with FIA Grade 2 status. It was supposed to host the fourth and penultimate round of the 2023 F4 Chinese Championship, but it was relocated to the Zhuhai International Circuit. It was included in the 2024 F4 Chinese Championship, serving as the second round of the championship.

== Events ==
Current

- August: F4 Chinese Championship
- October: TCR World Tour, TCR Asia Series, TCR China Touring Car Championship

== Lap records ==
As of October 2026, the fastest official race lap records at the Chengdu Tianfu International Circuit are listed as:

Category	Time	Driver	Vehicle	Event
West Circuit (2023–present): 3.265 km (2.029 mi)
Formula 4	1:21.413	Oscar Pedersen	Mygale M21-F4	2024 Tianfu F4 China round
TCR Touring Car	1:25.974	Rob Huff	Lynk & Co 03+ TCR	2026 Tianfu TCR China round
