= Bader Al Sulaiti =

Qatar racing driver (born 2008)

Bader Al Sulaiti بدر السليطي
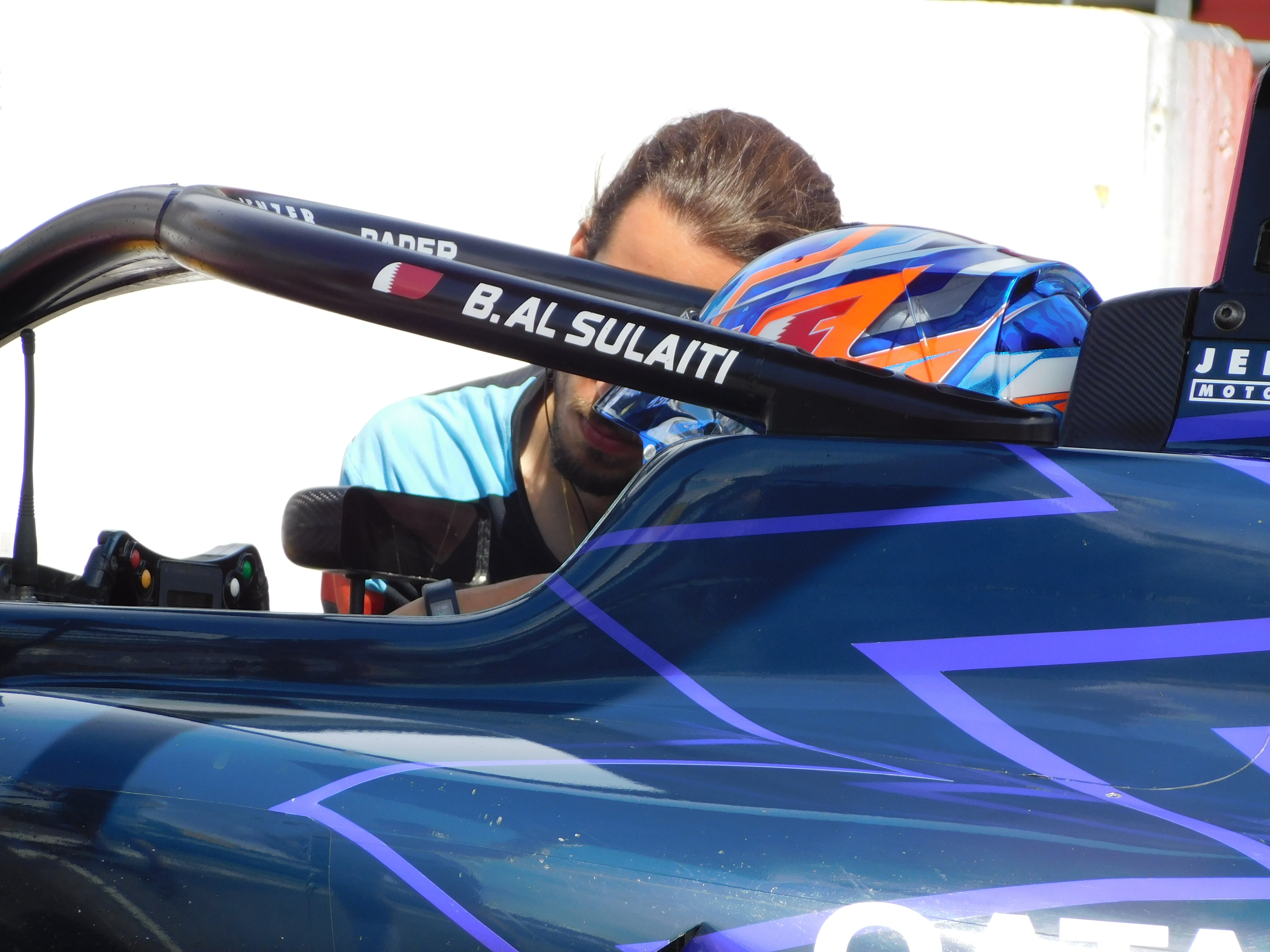
- Al Sulaiti in 2025
- Nationality: Qatar
- Born: 4 January 2008 (age 18) Doha, Qatar

Italian F4 Championship career
- Debut season: 2025
- Current team: Jenzer Motorsport
- Car number: 26
- Starts: 41
- Wins: 0
- Podiums: 1
- Poles: 0
- Fastest laps: 0
- Best finish: 19th in 2026

Previous series
- 2025–2026 2026 2025 2024: E4; UAE4 Series; F4 Middle East; FIA Motorsport Games Formula 4 Cup

Bader Al Sulaiti (born 4 January 2008) is a Qatari racing driver who last competed for Jenzer Motorsport in the Italian F4 Championship.

== Career ==
=== Karting ===
Al Sulaiti began karting in 2023, racing in the Senior Max category of the UAE Rotax Max Challenge. For the rest of the year, Al Sulaiti raced in the Qatar Karting Championship, winning the title, before finishing third in the season-ending MENA Karting Championship's Senior Max category.

=== Formula 4 ===
==== 2024 ====
After finishing sixth in the 2024 Qatar Karting Championship, Al Sulaiti participated in his first Formula 4 test with Xcel Motorsport at Barcelona, as a member of the Qatar Motorsports Academy. In October of that year, Al Sulaiti made his single-seater debut in the FIA Motorsport Games Formula 4 Cup, racing for Drivex-run Team Qatar.

==== 2025 ====
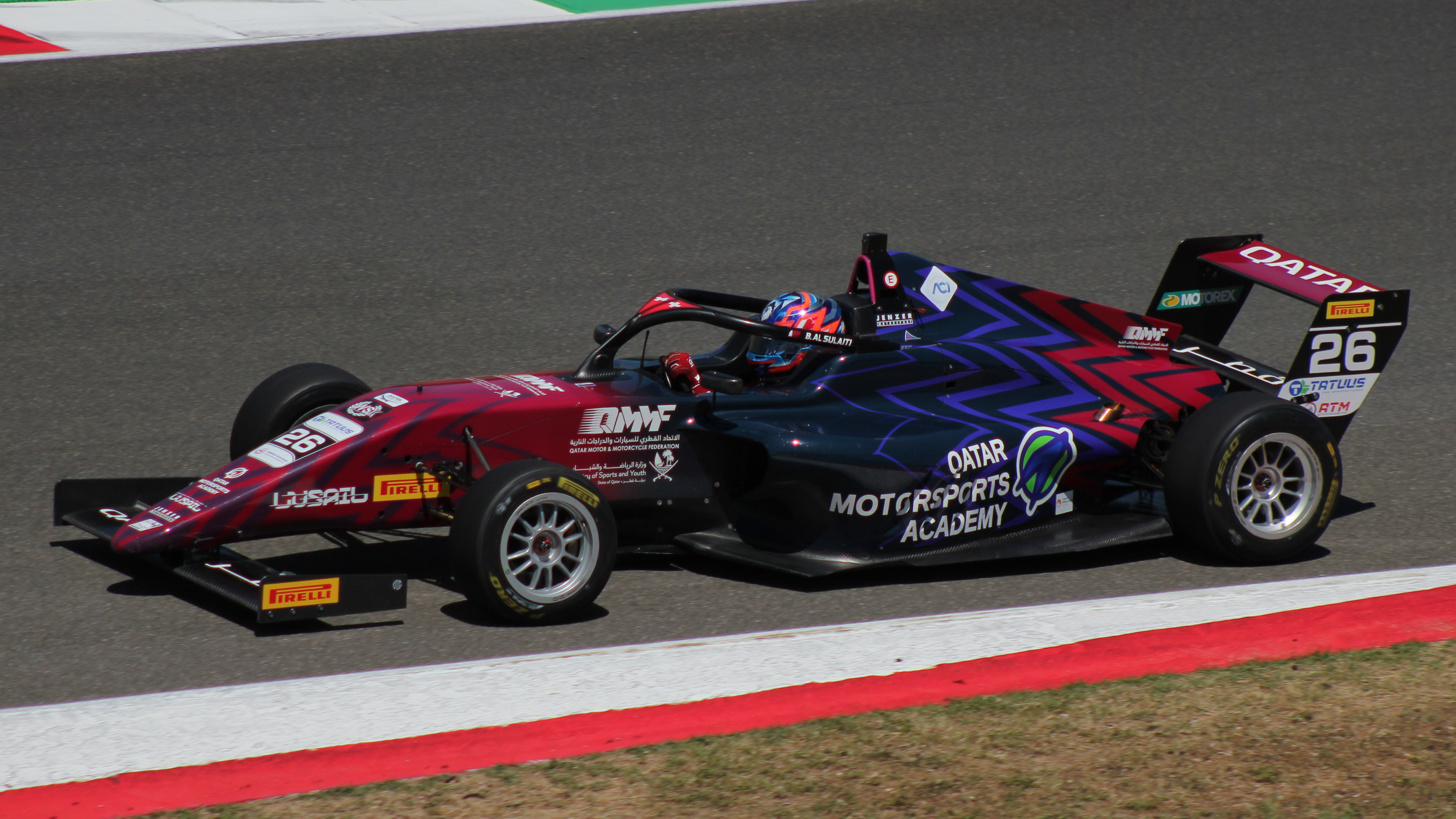
Al Sulaiti driving at the Mugello Circuit during the 2025 Italian F4 Championship

The following year, Al Sulaiti joined Xcel-supported QMMF to race in the F4 Middle East Championship, scoring his only point by finishing 12th in race three of the third Yas Marina round to take 23rd in the overall standings. For the rest of 2025, Al Sulaiti switched to Jenzer Motorsport for a dual campaign in the Italian F4 and E4 Championships, scoring a best result of 11th twice at Monza in the former, and 13th at Mugello in the latter.

==== 2026 ====
In 2026, Al Sulaiti began the year by returning to the Middle East to race in the UAE4 Series for Hitech, in which he scored his first win in single-seaters at the reverse-grid race of the second Yas Marina round, en route to a 12th-place points finish. For the rest of the year, Al Sulaiti returned to Jenzer for his second season in the Italian F4 Championship. After starting off the season with sixth-place finishes at Misano and Vallelunga, Al Sulaiti took his maiden series podium by finishing second in a wet race three at Mugello, serving as the highlight of the season as he finished 19th in points. During 2026, Al Sulaiti also made a one-off return to E4 at Le Castellet.

== Karting record ==
=== Karting career summary ===
Season	Series	Team	Position
2023	Qatar Karting Championship		1st
2023	IAME Euro Series – X30 Senior		123rd
2023	MENA Karting Championship – Senior Max		3rd
2024	Qatar Karting Championship		6th

== Racing record ==
=== Racing career summary ===
Season	Series	Team	Races	Wins	Poles	F/Laps	Podiums	Points	Position
2024	FIA Motorsport Games Formula 4 Cup	Team Qatar	1	0	0	0	0	—N/a	DSQ
2025	F4 Middle East Championship	QMMF	15	0	0	0	0	1	23rd
2025	Italian F4 Championship	Jenzer Motorsport	20	0	0	0	0	0	29th
2025	E4 Championship	Jenzer Motorsport	9	0	0	0	0	0	26th
2026	UAE4 Series	Hitech	12	1	0	1	1	29	12th
2026	Italian F4 Championship	Jenzer Motorsport	21	0	0	0	1	117	19th
2026	E4 Championship	Jenzer Motorsport	3	0	0	0	0	2	37th

* Season still in progress.

=== Complete FIA Motorsport Games results ===
Year	Entrant	Competition	Qualifying	Quali race	Main race
2024	Team Qatar	Formula 4 Cup	20th	DSQ	DSQ

=== Complete F4 Middle East Championship / UAE4 Series results ===
(key) (Races in bold indicate pole position; races in italics indicate fastest lap)

Year	Team	1	2	3	4	5	6	7	8	9	10	11	12	13	14	15	DC	Points
2025	QMMF	YMC1; 1; 26†	YMC1; 2; 23	YMC1; 3; 19	YMC2; 1; 18	YMC2; 2; 24	YMC2; 3 Ret	DUB; 1; 14	DUB; 2; 16	DUB; 3; 17	YMC3; 1 Ret	YMC3; 2; 16	YMC3; 3; 12	LUS; 1 Ret	LUS; 2; 15	LUS; 3; 14	23rd	1
2026	Hitech	YMC1; 1; 26	YMC1; 2; 23	YMC1; 3; 8	YMC2; 1; 11	YMC2; 2; 1	YMC2; 3; 31	DUB; 1; 30	DUB; 2; 19	DUB; 3; 32	LUS; 1; 17	LUS; 2 Ret	LUS; 3; 18				12th	29

=== Complete Italian F4 Championship results ===
(key) (Races in bold indicate pole position; races in italics indicate fastest lap)

Year	Team	1	2	3	4	5	6	7	8	9	10	11	12	13	14	15	16	17	18	19	20	21	22	23	24	25	26	27	28	DC	Points
2025	Jenzer Motorsport	MIS1; 1; 13	MIS1; 2; 16	MIS1; 3	MIS1; 4; 21	VLL; 1; 21	VLL; 2	VLL; 3; 12	VLL; 4; 29	MNZ; 1; 11	MNZ; 2; 27	MNZ; 3; 11	MUG; 1; 25	MUG; 2; 19	MUG; 3; 23	IMO; 1; 20	IMO; 2 C	IMO; 3; 24	CAT; 1; 13	CAT; 2; 20	CAT; 3 C	MIS2; 1	MIS2; 2; 13	MIS2; 3; 13	MIS2; 4 Ret	MIS2; 5; 16				29th	0
2026	Jenzer Motorsport	MIS1; 1; 6	MIS1; 2; 10	MIS1; 3	MIS1; 4; 12	VLL; 1; 6	VLL; 2; 22	VLL; 3	VLL; 4 Ret	MNZ; 1	MNZ; 2; 13	MNZ; 3; 11	MNZ; 4; 18	MUG1; 1; 26	MUG1; 2	MUG1; 3; 2	MUG1; 4; 7	IMO; 1; 29†	IMO; 2	IMO; 3; 16	IMO; 4; 27	MIS2; 1; 9	MIS2; 2; 26	MIS2; 3	MIS2; 4; 20	MUG2; 1; 31	MUG2; 2; 11	MUG2; 3	MUG2; 4; 23	19th	117

=== Complete E4 Championship results ===
(key) (Races in bold indicate pole position; races in italics indicate fastest lap)

Year	Team	1	2	3	4	5	6	7	8	9	DC	Points
2025	Jenzer Motorsport	LEC; 1; 23	LEC; 2; 16	LEC; 3; 24	MUG; 1; 13	MUG; 2; 16	MUG; 3; 32	MNZ; 1; 25†	MNZ; 2; 20	MNZ; 3; 20	26th	0
2026	Jenzer Motorsport	VLL; 1	VLL; 2	VLL; 3	LEC; 1; 14	LEC; 2; 19	LEC; 3 Ret	MNZ; 1	MNZ; 2	MNZ; 3	37th	2
