= 2026 GT4 Italian Series =

First season of the GT4 Italian Series

The 2026 GT4 Italian Series was the first season of the GT4 Italian Series organised by ACI Sport in partnership with SRO Motorsports Group. The races are contested with GT4-spec cars. The season started on 8 May at Misano World Circuit and finished on 11 October at the Autodromo Nazionale Monza.

== Calendar ==
The calendar for the 2026 season was unveiled on 1 January 2026. Four out of five race weekends supported the 2026 Italian GT Championship.

| Round | Circuit | Date | Supporting | Map |
|---|---|---|---|---|
| 1 | Misano World Circuit, Misano Adriatico, Emilia-Romagna | 8–10 May | TCR World Tour; Italian GT Championship Endurance Cup; Porsche Carrera Cup Italia; Italian F4 Championship; Italian Sport Prototype Championship | 2026 GT4 Italian Series is located in Italy |
| 2 | (Lazio) ACI Vallelunga Circuit, Campagnano di Roma, Rome | 3–5 July | Porsche Carrera Cup Italia; E4 Championship; Italian Sport Prototype Championship; Austria Formula Cup; F2000 Italian Formula Trophy | 2026 GT4 Italian Series is located in Italy |
| 3 | Autodromo Internazionale del Mugello, Mugello, Tuscany | 24–26 July | Italian GT Championship Sprint Cup; TCR Italy Touring Car Championship; Italian F4 Championship | 2026 GT4 Italian Series is located in Italy |
| 4 | Autodromo Internazionale Enzo e Dino Ferrari, Imola, Emilia-Romagna | 4–6 September | Formula Regional European Championship; Italian GT Championship Endurance Cup; Italian F4 Championship | 2026 GT4 Italian Series is located in Italy |
| 5 | Autodromo Nazionale Monza, Monza, Lombardy | 9–11 October | Italian GT Championship Sprint Cup; E4 Championship; Italian Sport Prototype Championship | 2026 GT4 Italian Series is located in Italy |

== Entries ==
| Team | Car | Engine | No. | Drivers | Class | Rounds |
|---|---|---|---|---|---|---|
| (Italy) V-Action - PB Racing | Lotus Emira GT4 | Toyota 2GR-FE 3.5 L V6 | 3 | (Italy) Ian Rocca | PA | All |
| (Italy) V-Action - PB Racing | Lotus Emira GT4 | Toyota 2GR-FE 3.5 L V6 | 3 | (Italy) Andrea Frizza | PA | 1–4 |
| (Italy) V-Action - PB Racing | Lotus Emira GT4 | Toyota 2GR-FE 3.5 L V6 | 3 | (Italy) Massimiliano Schiavone | PA | 5 |
| (Italy) V-Action - PB Racing | Lotus Emira GT4 | Toyota 2GR-FE 3.5 L V6 | 43 | (Italy) Leonardo Leone | Am | 1 |
| (Italy) V-Action - PB Racing | Lotus Emira GT4 | Toyota 2GR-FE 3.5 L V6 | 43 | (Italy) Riccardo Romagnoli | Am | 1 |
| (Italy) Speedy Motorsport | Toyota GR Supra GT4 Evo2 | Toyota B58H 3.0 L Turbo I6 | 4 | (Portugal) Tomas Guedes | PA | 5 |
| (Italy) Speedy Motorsport | Toyota GR Supra GT4 Evo2 | Toyota B58H 3.0 L Turbo I6 | 4 | (Netherlands) Mees Houben | PA | 5 |
| (Italy) Speedy Motorsport | Toyota GR Supra GT4 Evo2 | Toyota B58H 3.0 L Turbo I6 | 6 | (Portugal) Tomas Teixeira | PA | 5 |
| (Italy) Speedy Motorsport | Toyota GR Supra GT4 Evo2 | Toyota B58H 3.0 L Turbo I6 | 6 | (Netherlands) Raul Zunzarren | PA | 5 |
| (Italy) MEF Motorsport | Porsche 718 Cayman GT4 RS Clubsport | Porsche MDG.GA 4.0 L Flat-6 | 5 | (Italy) Filippo Maria Zanin | PA | All |
| (Italy) MEF Motorsport | Porsche 718 Cayman GT4 RS Clubsport | Porsche MDG.GA 4.0 L Flat-6 | 5 | (Italy) Filippo Bencivenni | PA | 1–3 |
| (Italy) MEF Motorsport | Porsche 718 Cayman GT4 RS Clubsport | Porsche MDG.GA 4.0 L Flat-6 | 5 | (Italy) Giovanni Costernaro | PA | 4 |
| (Italy) MEF Motorsport | Porsche 718 Cayman GT4 RS Clubsport | Porsche MDG.GA 4.0 L Flat-6 | 5 | (Italy) Alessandro Balzarotti | PA | 5 |
| (Italy) C.Z. Bassano Racing Team | Mercedes-AMG GT4 | Mercedes-AMG M178 4.0 L Turbo V8 | 7 | (Italy) Manuel Lasagni | PA | All |
| (Italy) C.Z. Bassano Racing Team | Mercedes-AMG GT4 | Mercedes-AMG M178 4.0 L Turbo V8 | 7 | (Italy) Filippo Zicardi | PA | All |
| (Italy) C.Z. Bassano Racing Team | Mercedes-AMG GT4 | Mercedes-AMG M178 4.0 L Turbo V8 | 8 | (United States) Peter "Tanakis" Anastasopoulos | Am | All |
| (Italy) C.Z. Bassano Racing Team | Mercedes-AMG GT4 | Mercedes-AMG M178 4.0 L Turbo V8 | 8 | (Italy) Maurizio Ceresoli | Am | All |
| (Italy) X Motors Team | Mercedes-AMG GT4 | Mercedes-AMG M178 4.0 L Turbo V8 | 11 | (Italy) Filippo Fant | PA | 4–5 |
| (Italy) X Motors Team | Mercedes-AMG GT4 | Mercedes-AMG M178 4.0 L Turbo V8 | 11 | (Italy) Lorenzo Tocci | PA | 4 |
| (Italy) X Motors Team | Mercedes-AMG GT4 | Mercedes-AMG M178 4.0 L Turbo V8 | 11 | (Italy) Filippo Donanzan | PA | 5 |
| (Italy) X Motors Team | Mercedes-AMG GT4 | Mercedes-AMG M178 4.0 L Turbo V8 | 52 | (Italy) Mauro Trentin | Am | All |
| (Italy) X Motors Team | Mercedes-AMG GT4 | Mercedes-AMG M178 4.0 L Turbo V8 | 52 | (Italy) Luca Riccardo Wagner | Am | All |
| (Slovenia) Lema Racing | Mercedes-AMG GT4 | Mercedes-AMG M178 4.0 L Turbo V8 | 14 | (Italy) Matthias Lodi | PA | All |
| (Slovenia) Lema Racing | Mercedes-AMG GT4 | Mercedes-AMG M178 4.0 L Turbo V8 | 14 | (Italy) Lorenzo Tocci | PA | 1–2 |
| (Slovenia) Lema Racing | Mercedes-AMG GT4 | Mercedes-AMG M178 4.0 L Turbo V8 | 14 | Sebastiano Pavan | PA | 4 |
| (Slovenia) Lema Racing | Mercedes-AMG GT4 | Mercedes-AMG M178 4.0 L Turbo V8 | 14 | (Switzerland) Christian Canonica | PA | 5 |
| (Slovenia) Lema Racing | Mercedes-AMG GT4 | Mercedes-AMG M178 4.0 L Turbo V8 | 19 | (Poland) Kornelia Olkucka | PA | All |
| (Slovenia) Lema Racing | Audi R8 LMS GT4 Evo | Audi DAR 5.2 L V10 | 17 | (Croatia) Grega Šimunović | PA | All |
| (Slovenia) Lema Racing | Audi R8 LMS GT4 Evo | Audi DAR 5.2 L V10 | 17 | (Croatia) Zak Šimunović | PA | All |
| (Italy) Casals Motorsport | BMW M4 GT4 Evo (G82) | BMW S58B30T0 3.0 L Turbo I6 | 16 | (Italy) Giacomo Maman | PA | All |
| (Italy) Casals Motorsport | BMW M4 GT4 Evo (G82) | BMW S58B30T0 3.0 L Turbo I6 | 16 | (Italy) Gustavo Sandrucci | PA | All |
| (Italy) Casals Motorsport | BMW M4 GT4 Evo (G82) | BMW S58B30T0 3.0 L Turbo I6 | 65 | (Italy) Luca Esposito | PA | All |
| (Italy) Casals Motorsport | BMW M4 GT4 Evo (G82) | BMW S58B30T0 3.0 L Turbo I6 | 65 | (Italy) Sebastian Gavazza | PA | All |
| (Italy) Promodrive | BMW M4 GT4 Evo (G82) | BMW S58B30T0 3.0 L Turbo I6 | 27 | (Australia) Aiva Anagnostiadis | PA | All |
| (Italy) Promodrive | BMW M4 GT4 Evo (G82) | BMW S58B30T0 3.0 L Turbo I6 | 27 | (Italy) Andrea Palazzo | PA | All |
| Toyota Gazoo Racing Sweden | Toyota GR Supra GT4 Evo2 | Toyota B58H 3.0 L Turbo I6 | 29 | (Sweden) Maximilian Boström | PA | 1 |
| Toyota Gazoo Racing Sweden | Toyota GR Supra GT4 Evo2 | Toyota B58H 3.0 L Turbo I6 | 29 | (United Kingdom) Henry Joslyn | PA | 1 |
| Toyota Gazoo Racing Sweden | Toyota GR Supra GT4 Evo2 | Toyota B58H 3.0 L Turbo I6 | 55 | (Sweden) Christoffer Brunnhagen | Am | 1 |
| Toyota Gazoo Racing Sweden | Toyota GR Supra GT4 Evo2 | Toyota B58H 3.0 L Turbo I6 | 55 | (Sweden) Mikael Brunnhagen | Am | 1 |
| (Italy) Tuder Motorsport | Alpine A110 GT4 Evo | Renault TCe M5Pt 1.8 L Turbo I4 | 38 | (Italy) Eric Brigliadori | PA | 1 |
| (Italy) Tuder Motorsport | Alpine A110 GT4 Evo | Renault TCe M5Pt 1.8 L Turbo I4 | 38 | (Italy) Gianpaolo Orlandi | PA | 1 |
| (Italy) Tuder Motorsport | Alpine A110 GT4 Evo | Renault TCe M5Pt 1.8 L Turbo I4 | 39 | (Italy) Alessandro Balzarotti | Am | 3–4 |
| (Italy) Tuder Motorsport | Alpine A110 GT4 Evo | Renault TCe M5Pt 1.8 L Turbo I4 | 39 | (Italy) Gian Piero Cristoni | Am | 3–4 |
| (Switzerland) Centri Porsche Ticino | Porsche 718 Cayman GT4 RS Clubsport | Porsche MDG.GA 4.0 L Flat-6 | 51 | (Italy) Paolo Gnemmi | PA | 3–4 |
| (Switzerland) Centri Porsche Ticino | Porsche 718 Cayman GT4 RS Clubsport | Porsche MDG.GA 4.0 L Flat-6 | 51 | (Italy) Mattia Happacher | PA | 3–4 |
| (Switzerland) Centri Porsche Ticino | Porsche 718 Cayman GT4 RS Clubsport | Porsche MDG.GA 4.0 L Flat-6 | 51 | (Italy) Nicolò Manassero | Am | 5 |
| (Switzerland) Centri Porsche Ticino | Porsche 718 Cayman GT4 RS Clubsport | Porsche MDG.GA 4.0 L Flat-6 | 51 | (Italy) Francesco Polari | Am | 5 |
| (Switzerland) Centri Porsche Ticino | Porsche 718 Cayman GT4 RS Clubsport | Porsche MDG.GA 4.0 L Flat-6 | 75 | (Italy) Danilo Arfini | PA | All |
| (Switzerland) Centri Porsche Ticino | Porsche 718 Cayman GT4 RS Clubsport | Porsche MDG.GA 4.0 L Flat-6 | 75 | (Switzerland) Alex Fontana | PA | 1, 3–4 |
| (Switzerland) Centri Porsche Ticino | Porsche 718 Cayman GT4 RS Clubsport | Porsche MDG.GA 4.0 L Flat-6 | 75 | (Austria) Norbert Siedler | PA | 2, 5 |
| (Switzerland) Centri Porsche Ticino | Porsche 718 Cayman GT4 RS Clubsport | Porsche MDG.GA 4.0 L Flat-6 | 76 | (Austria) Jorden Dolischka | PA | All |
| (Switzerland) Centri Porsche Ticino | Porsche 718 Cayman GT4 RS Clubsport | Porsche MDG.GA 4.0 L Flat-6 | 76 | (Italy) Noah Massa | PA | All |
| (Italy) Gino Scuderia | Aston Martin Vantage AMR GT4 | Mercedes-Benz M177 4.0 L Turbo V8 | 68 | (Brazil) Tiago Bastos | Am | 1 |
| (Italy) Gino Scuderia | Aston Martin Vantage AMR GT4 | Mercedes-Benz M177 4.0 L Turbo V8 | 68 | (Brazil) Tiago Bastos | PA | 2–5 |
| (Italy) Gino Scuderia | Aston Martin Vantage AMR GT4 | Mercedes-Benz M177 4.0 L Turbo V8 | 68 | (Brazil) Pedro Ebrahim | PA | 2–5 |

| Icon | Class |
|---|---|
| PA | Pro-Am Cup |
| Am | Am Cup |

== Race results ==
Bold indicates overall winner.

| Round | | Circuit | Pole position | Pro-Am Winners | Am Winners |
|---|---|---|---|---|---|
| 1 | R1 | (Emilia-Romagna) Misano | (Switzerland) No. 75 Centri Porsche Ticino | **No. 29 Toyota Gazoo Racing Sweden** | (Italy) No. 8 C.Z. Bassano Racing Team |
| 1 | R1 | (Emilia-Romagna) Misano | (Italy) Danilo Arfini (Switzerland) Alex Fontana | **(Sweden) Maximilian Boström** **(United Kingdom) Henry Joslyn** | (United States) Peter Anastasopoulos (Italy) Maurizio Ceresoli |
| 1 | R2 | (Emilia-Romagna) Misano | (Italy) No. 38 Tuder Motorsport | **No. 29 Toyota Gazoo Racing Sweden** | No. 55 Toyota Gazoo Racing Sweden |
| 1 | R2 | (Emilia-Romagna) Misano | (Italy) Eric Brigliadori (Italy) Gianpaolo Orlandi | **(Sweden) Maximilian Boström** **(United Kingdom) Henry Joslyn** | (Sweden) Christoffer Brunnhagen (Sweden) Mikael Brunnhagen |
| 2 | R1 | (Lazio) Vallelunga | (Italy) No. 3 V-Action - PB Racing | **(Italy) No. 16 Casals Motorsport** | (Italy) No. 52 X Motors Team |
| 2 | R1 | (Lazio) Vallelunga | (Italy) Andrea Frizza (Italy) Ian Rocca | **(Italy) Giacomo Maman** **(Italy) Gustavo Sandrucci** | (Italy) Mauro Trentin (Italy) Luca Riccardo Wagner |
| 2 | R2 | (Lazio) Vallelunga | (Italy) No. 5 MEF Motorsport | **(Italy) No. 16 Casals Motorsport** | (Italy) No. 52 X Motors Team |
| 2 | R2 | (Lazio) Vallelunga | (Italy) Filippo Bencivenni (Italy) Filippo Maria Zanin | **(Italy) Giacomo Maman** **(Italy) Gustavo Sandrucci** | (Italy) Mauro Trentin (Italy) Luca Riccardo Wagner |
| 3 | R1 | (Tuscany) Mugello | (Italy) No. 16 Casals Motorsport | **(Italy) No. 16 Casals Motorsport** | (Italy) No. 39 Tuder Motorsport |
| 3 | R1 | (Tuscany) Mugello | (Italy) Giacomo Maman (Italy) Gustavo Sandrucci | **(Italy) Giacomo Maman** **(Italy) Gustavo Sandrucci** | (Italy) Alessandro Balzarotti (Italy) Gian Piero Cristoni |
| 3 | R2 | (Tuscany) Mugello | (Switzerland) No. 75 Centri Porsche Ticino | **(Italy) No. 16 Casals Motorsport** | (Italy) No. 8 C.Z. Bassano Racing Team |
| 3 | R2 | (Tuscany) Mugello | (Italy) Danilo Arfini (Switzerland) Alex Fontana | **(Italy) Giacomo Maman** **(Italy) Gustavo Sandrucci** | (United States) Peter Anastasopoulos (Italy) Maurizio Ceresoli |
| 4 | R1 | (Emilia-Romagna) Imola | (Italy) No. 5 MEF Motorsport | **(Italy) No. 7 C.Z. Bassano Racing Team** | (Italy) No. 39 Tuder Motorsport |
| 4 | R1 | (Emilia-Romagna) Imola | (Italy) Giovanni Costernaro (Italy) Filippo Maria Zanin | **(Italy) Manuel Lasagni** **(Italy) Filippo Zicardi** | (Italy) Alessandro Balzarotti (Italy) Gian Piero Cristoni |
| 4 | R2 | (Emilia-Romagna) Imola | (Switzerland) No. 75 Centri Porsche Ticino | **(Italy) No. 16 Casals Motorsport** | (Italy) No. 8 C.Z. Bassano Racing Team |
| 4 | R2 | (Emilia-Romagna) Imola | (Italy) Danilo Arfini (Switzerland) Alex Fontana | **(Italy) Giacomo Maman** **(Italy) Gustavo Sandrucci** | (United States) Peter Anastasopoulos (Italy) Maurizio Ceresoli |
| 5 | R1 | (Lombardy) Monza | (Italy) No. 3 V-Action - PB Racing | **(Italy) No. 27 Promodrive** | (Switzerland) No. 51 Centri Porsche Ticino |
| 5 | R1 | (Lombardy) Monza | (Italy) Ian Rocca (Italy) Massimiliano Schiavone | **(Australia) Aiva Anagnostiadis** **(Italy) Andrea Palazzo** | (Italy) Nicolò Manassero (Italy) Francesco Polari |
| 5 | R2 | (Lombardy) Monza | (Italy) No. 4 Speedy Motorsport | **(Italy) No. 4 Speedy Motorsport** | (Switzerland) No. 51 Centri Porsche Ticino |
| 5 | R2 | (Lombardy) Monza | (Portugal) Tomas Guedes (Netherlands) Mees Houben | **(Portugal) Tomas Guedes** **(Netherlands) Mees Houben** | (Italy) Nicolò Manassero (Italy) Francesco Polari |

== Championship standings ==
Points are awarded to the top ten finishers per class in each race.

| Position | 1st | 2nd | 3rd | 4th | 5th | 6th | 7th | 8th | 9th | 10th |
| Points | 20 | 15 | 12 | 10 | 8 | 6 | 4 | 3 | 2 | 1 |

=== Drivers' championship ===
==== Pro-Am Standings ====
| Pos. | Drivers | Team | MIS (Emilia-Romagna) | | VAL (Lazio) | | MUG (Tuscany) | | IMO (Emilia-Romagna) | | MNZ (Lombardy) | | Pts | Net Points |
|---|---|---|---|---|---|---|---|---|---|---|---|---|---|---|
| 1 | (Italy) Giacomo Maman (Italy) Gustavo Sandrucci | (Italy) Casals Motorsport | 2 | 4 | 1 | 1 | 1 | 1 | 2 | 1 | Ret | Ret | 140 | 140 |
| 2 | (Italy) Manuel Lasagni (Italy) Filippo Ziccardi | (Italy) C.Z. Bassano Racing Team | 4 | 9 | 4 | 2 | 5 | 9 | 1 | 3 | 3 | 5 | 99 | 97 |
| 3 | (Italy) Filippo Maria Zanin | (Italy) MEF Motorsport | 3 | 7 | 2 | 8 | 2 | 4 | 6 | 2 | 4 | 9 | 92 | 90 |
| 4 | (Australia) Aiva Anagnostiadis (Italy) Andrea Palazzo | (Italy) Promodrive | Ret | 12 | 3 | 6 | Ret | 3 | 8 | 6 | 1 | 4 | 69 | 69 |
| 5 | (Italy) Danilo Arfini | (Switzerland) Centri Porsche Ticino | 6 | 6 | 5 | 5 | 7 | 2 | Ret | 5 | 6 | 10 | 62 | 62 |
| 6 | (Italy) Luca Esposito (Italy) Sebastian Gavazza | (Italy) Casals Motorsport | 5 | 8 | Ret | 3 | 3 | Ret | 7 | 8 | 2 | 8 | 60 | 60 |
| 7 | (Italy) Filippo Bencivenni | (Italy) MEF Motorsport | 3 | 7 | 2 | 8 | 2 | 4 | | | | | 59 | 59 |
| 8 | (Italy) Matthias Lodi | (Slovenia) Lema Racing | 9 | 3 | Ret | 7 | 10 | 7 | 3 | 12 | 8 | 6 | 44 | 44 |
| 9 | (Austria) Jorden Dolischka (Italy) Noah Massa | (Switzerland) Centri Porsche Ticino | 7 | 10 | 7 | 9 | 6 | 8 | 5 | 9 | 5 | 7 | 42 | 41 |
| 10 | (Switzerland) Alex Fontana | (Switzerland) Centri Porsche Ticino | 6 | 6 | | | 7 | 2 | Ret | 5 | | | 39 | 39 |
| 11 | (Italy) Lorenzo Tocci | (Slovenia) Lema Racing | 9 | 3 | Ret | 7 | | | | | | | 38 | 38 |
| 11 | (Italy) Lorenzo Tocci | (Italy) X Motors Team | | | | | | | 4 | 4 | | | 38 | 38 |
| 12 | (Italy) Ian Rocca | (Italy) V-Action - PB Racing | Ret | 5 | Ret | 4 | 4 | 6 | 11 | 11 | 10 | Ret | 35 | 35 |
| 13 | (Italy) Andrea Frizza | (Italy) V-Action - PB Racing | Ret | 5 | Ret | 4 | 4 | 6 | 11 | 11 | | | 34 | 34 |
| 14 | (Poland) Kornelia Olkucka | (Slovenia) Lema Racing | 8 | Ret | 6 | 10 | Ret | Ret | 10 | 7 | 9 | 11 | 17 | 17 |
| 15 | (Slovenia) Grega Simunovic (Slovenia) Zak Simunovic | (Slovenia) Lema Racing | Ret | 13 | Ret | Ret | 9 | Ret | Ret | 13 | Ret | Ret | 2 | 2 |
Not classified
| | (Sweden) Maximilian Bostrom (United Kingdom) Henry Joslyn | Toyota Gazoo Racing Sweden | 1 | 1 | | | | | | | | | 40 | 0 |
| | (Italy) Filippo Fant | (Italy) X Motors Team | | | | | | | 4 | 4 | Ret | 3 | 32 | 0 |
| | (Austria) Norbert Siedler | (Switzerland) Centri Porsche Ticino | | | 5 | 5 | | | | | 6 | 10 | 23 | 0 |
| | (Italy) Giovanni Costernaro | (Italy) MEF Motorsport | | | | | | | 6 | 2 | | | 21 | 0 |
| | (Portugal) Tomas Guedes (Netherlands) Mees Houben | (Italy) Speedy Motorsport | | | | | | | | | 11 | 1 | 20 | 0 |
| | (Portugal) Tomas Teixeira (Spain) Raul Zunzarren | (Italy) Speedy Motorsport | | | | | | | | | 7 | 2 | 19 | 0 |
| | (Italy) Eric Brigliadori (Italy) Gianpaolo Orlandi | (Italy) Tuder Motorsport | Ret | 2 | | | | | | | | | 15 | 0 |
| | (Italy) Mattia Happacher | (Switzerland) Centri Porsche Ticino | | | | | 8 | 5 | 9 | 10 | | | 14 | 0 |
| | (Italy) Sebastiano Pavan | (Slovenia) Lema Racing | | | | | | | 3 | 12 | | | 12 | 0 |
| | (Italy) Filippo Donanzan | (Italy) X Motors Team | | | | | | | | | Ret | 3 | 12 | 0 |
| | (Italy) Alessandro Balzarotti | (Italy) MEF Motorsport | | | | | | | | | 4 | 9 | 12 | 0 |
| | (Italy) Paolo Gnemmi | (Switzerland) Centri Porsche Ticino | | | | | 8 | 5 | | | | | 11 | 0 |
| | (Switzerland) Christian Canonica | (Slovenia) Lema Racing | | | | | | | | | 8 | 6 | 9 | 9 |
| | (Italy) Francesco Polari | (Switzerland) Centri Porsche Ticino | | | | | | | 9 | 10 | | | 3 | 0 |
| | (Italy) Massimiliano Schiavone | (Italy) V-Action - PB Racing | | | | | | | | | 10 | Ret | 1 | 0 |
| | (Brazil) Tiago Bastos | (Italy) Gino Scuderia | Ret | 11 | | | | | | | | | 0 | 0 |
Trophy class ineligible for championship
| – | (Brazil) Tiago Bastos (Brazil) Pedro Ebrahim | (Italy) Gino Scuderia | | | 1 | Ret | Ret | 1 | Ret | 1 | 1 | 1 | – | – |

Key
| Colour | Result |
|---|---|
| Gold | Race winner |
| Silver | 2nd place |
| Bronze | 3rd place |
| Green | Points finish |
| Blue | Non-points finish |
| Blue | Non-classified finish (NC) |
| Purple | Did not finish (Ret) |
| Black | Disqualified (DSQ) |
| Black | Excluded (EX) |
| White | Did not start (DNS) |
| White | Race cancelled (C) |
| White | Withdrew (WD) |
| Blank | Did not participate |

==== Am Standings ====
| Pos. | Drivers | Team | MIS (Emilia-Romagna) | | VAL (Lazio) | | MUG (Tuscany) | | IMO (Emilia-Romagna) | | MNZ (Lombardy) | | Pts | Net Points |
|---|---|---|---|---|---|---|---|---|---|---|---|---|---|---|
| 1 | (Italy) Mauro Trentin (Italy) Riccardo Luca Wagner | (Italy) X Motors Team | Ret | 2 | 1 | 1 | 2 | 2 | 2 | 2 | 3 | 2 | 142 | 142 |
| 2 | (United States) Panagiotes Anastasopulos (Italy) Maurizio Ceresoli | (Italy) C.Z. Bassano Racing Team | 1 | 3 | 2 | Ret | 3 | 1 | 3 | 1 | 2 | 3 | 138 | 138 |
Not classified
| | (Italy) Alessandro Balzarotti (Italy) Gian Piero Cristoni | (Italy) Tuder Motorsport | | | | | 1 | DNS | 1 | DNS | | | 40 | 0 |
| | (Italy) Nicolò Manassero (Italy) Francesco Polari | (Switzerland) Centri Porsche Ticino | | | | | | | | | 1 | 1 | 40 | 0 |
| | (Sweden) Christoffer Brunnhagen (Sweden) Mikael Brunnhagen | Toyota Gazoo Racing Sweden | 3 | 1 | | | | | | | | | 32 | 0 |
| | (Italy) Leonardo Leone (Italy) Riccardo Romagnoli | (Italy) V-Action - PB Racing | 2 | 4 | | | | | | | | | 25 | 0 |

== See also ==
- 2026 British GT Championship
- 2026 GT4 European Series
- 2026 French GT4 Cup
- 2026 GT4 America Series
- 2026 GT4 Australia Series
- 2026 SRO Japan Cup
- 2026 SRO GT Cup
