= Luka Sammalisto =

Finnish racing driver (born 2007)

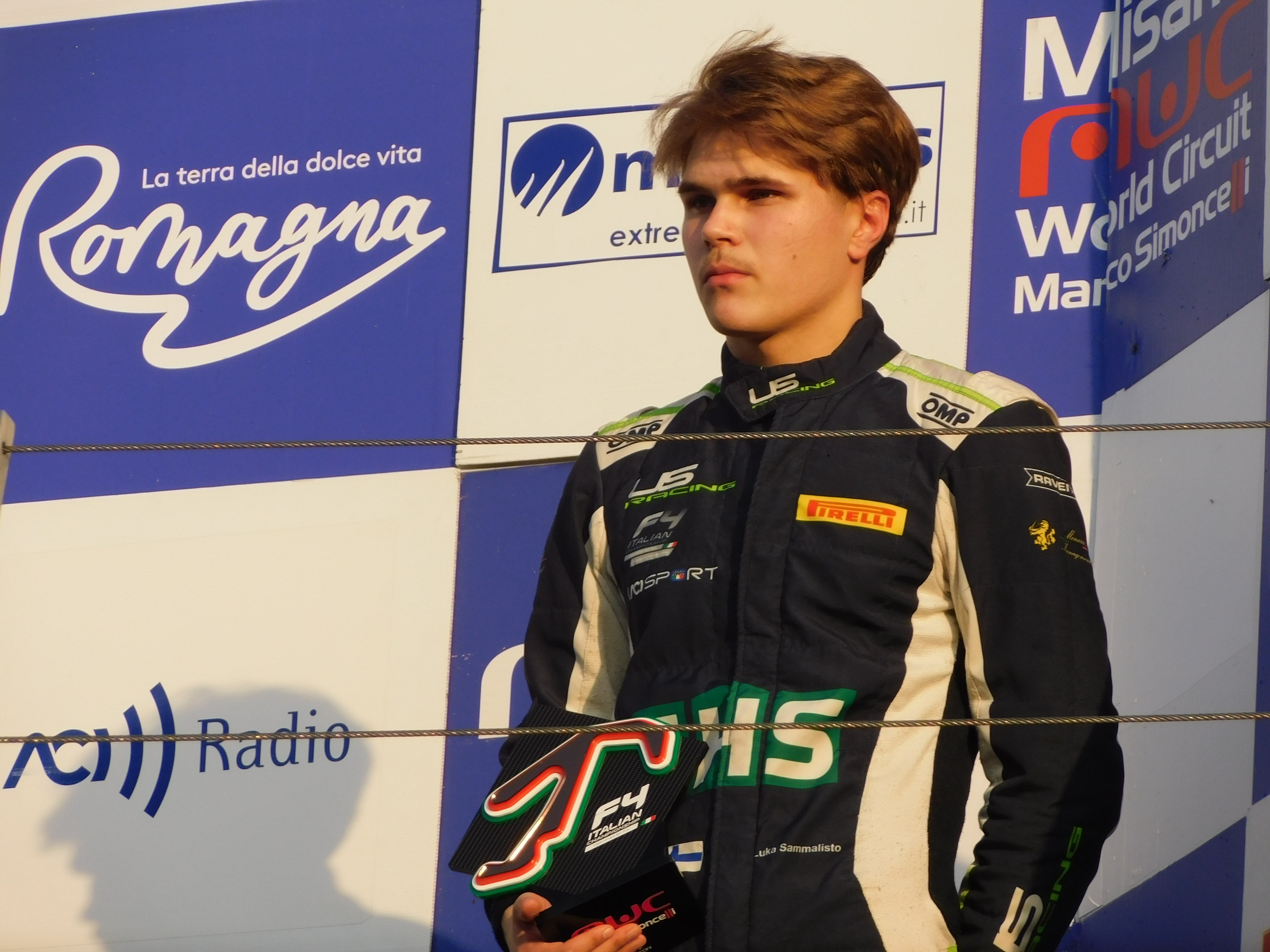
- Sammalisto in 2025
- Nationality: (Finland) Finnish
- Born: 25 November 2007 (age 18) Ylöjärvi, Finland

Italian F4 Championship career
- Debut season: 2024
- Current team: US Racing
- Car number: 7
- Former teams: R-ace GP
- Starts: 41
- Wins: 4
- Podiums: 7
- Poles: 2
- Fastest laps: 6
- Best finish: 8th in 2025

Previous series
- 2025 2024 2024: Formula Winter Series; Euro 4 F4 UAE
- Statistics up to date as of 31 May 2026.

Luka Sammalisto (born 25 November 2007) is a Finnish racing driver who currently competes in the Italian F4 Championship for US Racing.

== Career ==
=== Karting ===
Sammalisto began karting at the age of seven. During his karting career, he most notably won the 2022 Finnish Karting Championship in OK. Sammalisto also competed in WSK and CIK-FIA competitions during his karting career, in which he was a Kart Republic factory driver from 2021 until 2023.

=== Formula 4 ===
==== 2024 ====
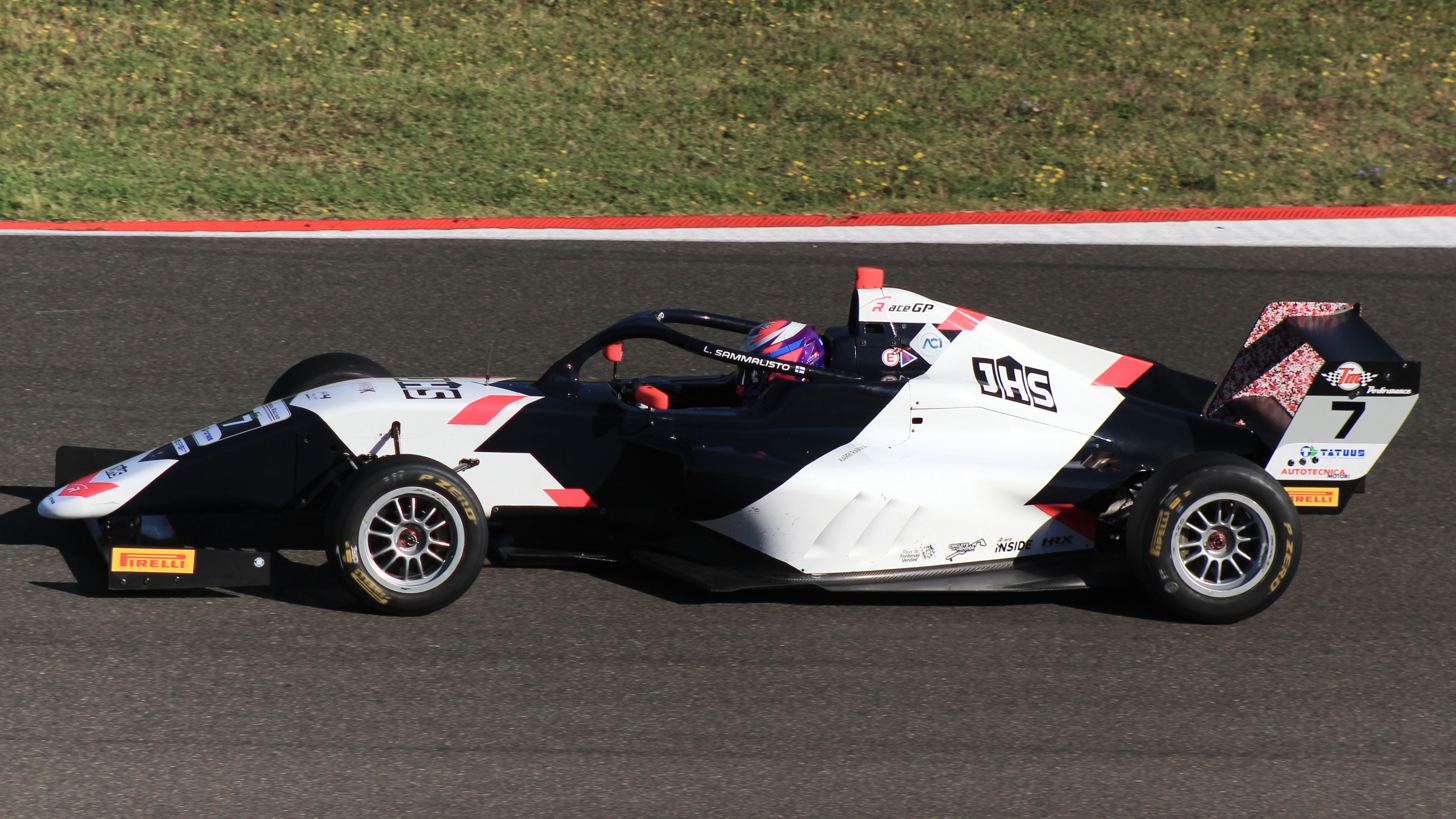
Sammalisto driving at the Mugello Circuit during the 2024 Italian F4 Championship

Stepping up to Formula 4 competition for 2024, Sammalisto joined R-ace GP to compete in the Formula 4 UAE Championship. Taking his first points in race two of the first Dubai round by finishing eighth in race two, Sammalisto took his season-best result at the same venue two weeks later by finishing sixth in race two.

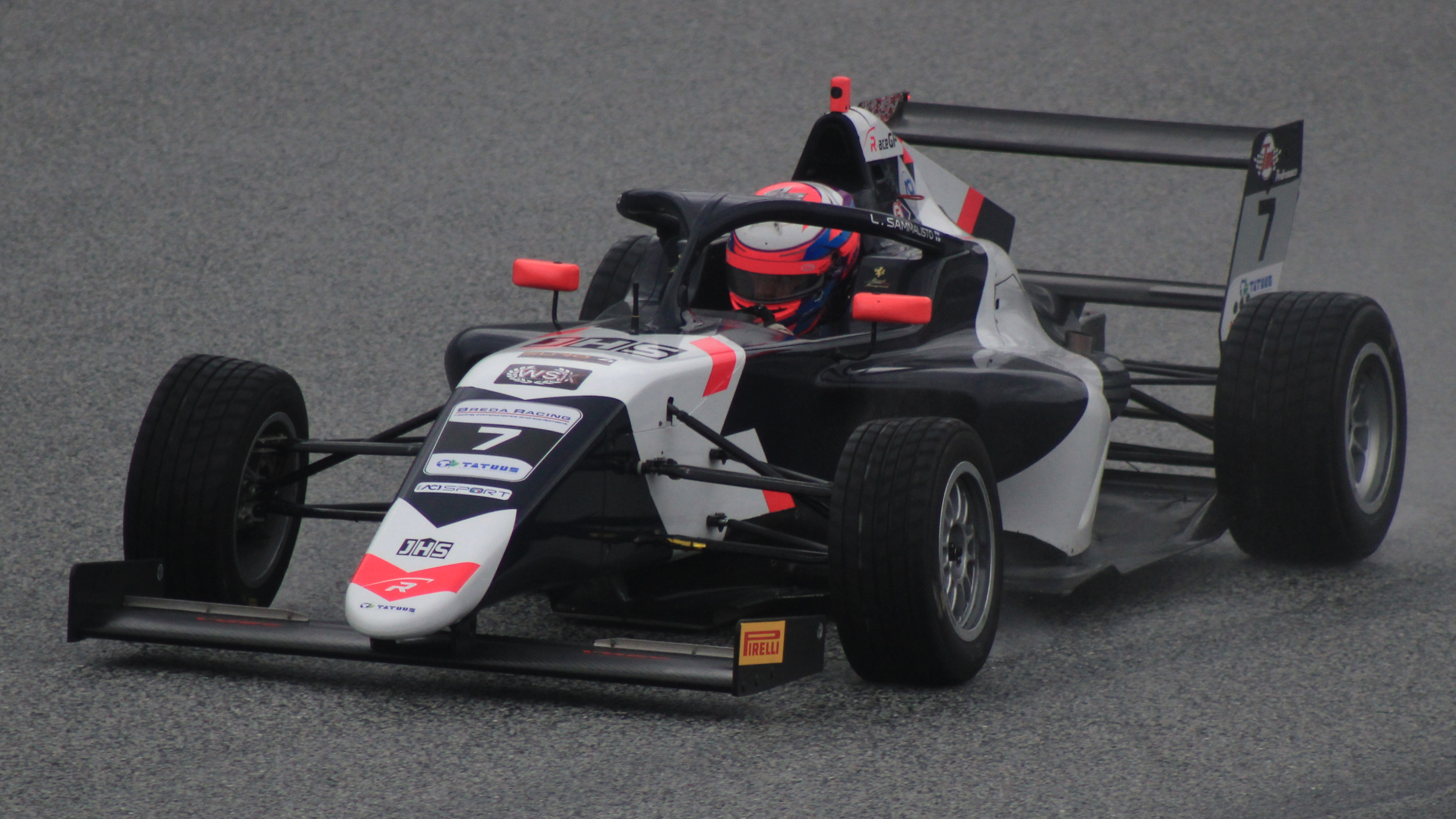
Sammalisto driving at the Red Bull Ring during the 2024 Euro 4 Championship

Remaining with the same team for the rest of the year, Sammalisto competed with them in both the Italian F4 and Euro 4 Championships. In the former, Sammalisto scored his first points at Imola by finishing seventh in race three. After not scoring points at Vallelunga and Barcelona and missing two rounds due fractures in three vertebrae, Sammalisto scored two points finishes in the season-ending round at Monza en route to an 18th-place points finish. In Euro 4, Sammalisto raced in the final two rounds of the season, only scoring points in the season-ending round at Monza by finishing eighth in race three.

==== 2025 ====
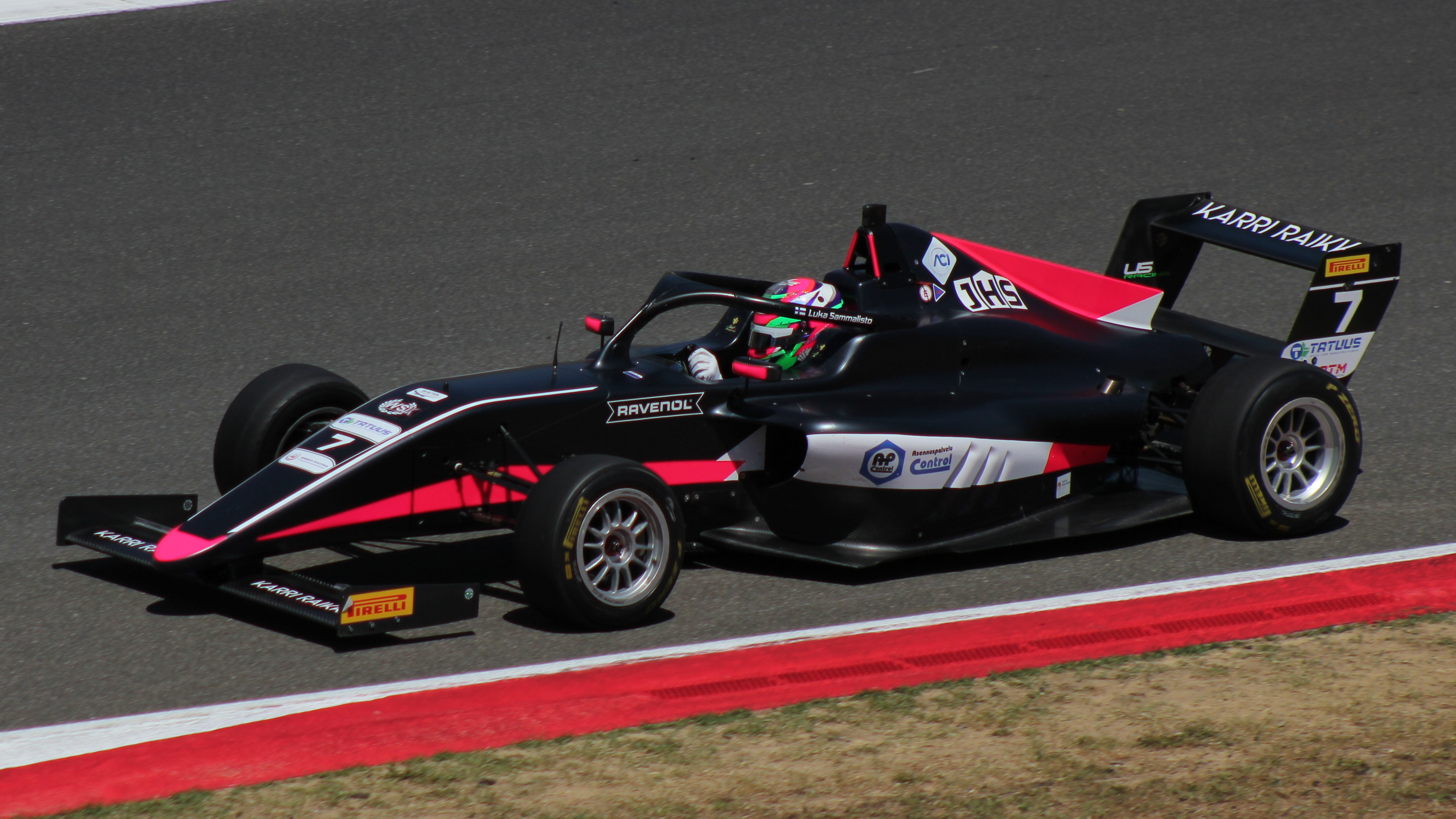
Sammalisto driving at the Mugello Circuit during the 2025 Italian F4 Championship

Sammalisto switched to US Racing for 2025, beginning his season in the Formula Winter Series, where he contested the first and last rounds of the season, taking a best result of fourth in race two at Algarve. Sammalisto then returned to the Italian F4 Championship for the rest of the year, in which he started off the season with a seventh-place finish at Misano. Following a best result of ninth at Vallelunga, he scored his maiden series podium by finishing second in race three at Monza. In the following three rounds, Sammalisto scored a best result of fifth at both Mugello and Barcelona, before ending the year with back-to-back third-place finishes at Misano en route to an eighth-place points finish.

=== 2026 ===
For the 2026 season, he remained with US Racing. In the opening round at Misano, he got his maiden single-seater pole positions in the second and third race, converting the former to his maiden win in car racing. Sammalisto did back to back threepeats at Vallelunga and Monza, winning six races in a row. In the fourth round at Mugello, he took podiums in the first and third races. At Imola, he claimed triple pole positions, converting them to wins in races one and three. Although the penultimate round at Misano didn't yield any podiums, he sealed the championship title. Sammalisto also did another threepeat in the final round at Mugello.

Alongside Italy F4, he also did the E4 Championship with US Racing. He took two wins in the first and third races of the opening round at Vallelunga, and collected a single podium in the second race of the penultimate round at Paul Ricard. He won the final race of the final round at Monza and tied on championship points with title rival Kenzo Craigie, but didn't win the title as he lost on countback.

With US Racing, he is set to compete in the FIA F4 World Cup.

=== Formula Regional ===
Sammalisto was initially set to step up to the Formula Regional European Championship in 2026 with Trident. However, due to undisclosed reasons, he was replaced by Kai Daryanani for the season.

== Karting record ==
=== Karting career summary ===
Season	Series	Team	Position
2018	Rotax Max Challenge Finland - Mini Max		8th
2019	Andrea Margutti Trophy - OK Junior	Koski Motorsport	22nd
2019	CIK-FIA Karting European Championship - OK Junior	Koski Motorsport	97th
2019	FIA Karting World Championship - OK Junior	Koski Motorsport	
2019	WSK Open Cup - OK Junior	Koski Motorsport	52nd
2019	Estonian championship - OK Junior	Gear Racing	9th
2019	Finnish Championship - OK Junior		18th
2020	WSK Super Master Series - OK Junior	Kohtala Sports	69th
2020	WSK Euro Series - OK Junior	Exprit Racing Team	75th
2020	Champions of the Future - OK Junior	Exprit Racing Team	
2020	CIK-FIA Karting European Championship - OK Junior	Exprit Racing Team Srl	81st
2020	FIA Karting World Championship - OK Junior	Exprit Racing Team Srl	
2020	Finnish Championship - OK Junior		8th
2021	WSK Champions Cup - OK Junior	KR Motorsport	
2021	WSK Super Master Series - OK Junior	KR Motorsport	27th
2021	Champions of the Future - OK Junior	KR Motorsport	36th
2021	CIK-FIA Karting European Championship - OK Junior	KR Motorsport	13th
2021	WSK Euro Series - OK Junior	KR Motorsport	58th
2021	WSK Open Cup - OK Junior	KR Motorsport	17th
2021	FIA Karting World Championship - OK Junior	KR Motorsport	12th
2021	WSK Final Cup - OK	KR Motorsport	28th
2021	Finnish Championship - OK Junior		8th
2022	WSK Super Master Series - OK	KR Motorsport	19th
2022	Champions of the Future - Winter Series - OK	KR Motorsport	8th
2022	Champions of the Future - OK	KR Motorsport	20th
2022	CIK-FIA Karting European Championship - OK	KR Motorsport	22nd
2022	FIA Karting World Championship - OK	KR Motorsport	21st
2022	WSK Open Cup - OK	KR Motorsport	9th
2022	WSK Final Cup - OK	KR Motorsport	33rd
2022	Finnish Championship - OK		1st
2023	27° South Garda Winter Cup - KZ2	King Racing Team	15th
2023	WSK Super Master Series - KZ2	KR Motorsport	64th
2023	WSK Super Master Series - OK	KR Motorsport	45th
2023	Champions of the Future - OK	KR Motorsport	27th
2023	CIK-FIA Karting European Championship - OK	KR Motorsport	26th
2023	CIK-FIA Karting European Championship - KZ2	SP Motorsport	60th
2023	WSK Open Series - KZ2	SP Motorsport	94th
2023	Deutsche Kart Meisterschaft - KZ2		
2023	WSK Euro Series - OK	Energy Srl	50th
2023	FIA Karting World Cup - KZ2	Energy Corse Srl	
2023	FIA Karting World Championship - OK	Energy Corse Srl	37th

== Racing record ==
=== Racing career summary ===
Season	Series	Team	Races	Wins	Poles	F/Laps	Podiums	Points	Position
2024	Formula 4 UAE Championship	R-ace GP	15	0	0	0	0	12	20th
2024	Italian F4 Championship	R-ace GP	15	0	0	0	0	11	18th
2024	Euro 4 Championship	R-ace GP	6	0	0	0	0	4	20th
2025	Formula Winter Series	US Racing	6	0	0	0	0	32	13th
2025	Italian F4 Championship	US Racing	20	0	0	3	3	132	8th
2026	Italian F4 Championship	US Racing	21	12	9	9	15	476	**1st**
2026	E4 Championship	US Racing	9	3	1	2	6	190	**2nd**
2026	FIA F4 World Cup	US Racing						—N/a	

* Season still in progress.

=== Complete Formula 4 UAE Championship results ===
(key) (Races in bold indicate pole position; races in italics indicate fastest lap)

Year	Team	1	2	3	4	5	6	7	8	9	10	11	12	13	14	15	DC	Points
2024	R-ace GP	YMC1; 1; 20	YMC1; 2; 22	YMC1; 3; 17	YMC2; 1 Ret	YMC2; 2; 26	YMC2; 3; 19	DUB1; 1; 20	DUB1; 2; 8	DUB1; 3; 17	YMC3; 1; 18	YMC3; 2; 13	YMC3; 3; 12	DUB2; 1; 12	DUB2; 2; 6	DUB2; 3; 15	20th	12

=== Complete Italian F4 Championship results ===
(key) (Races in bold indicate pole position; races in italics indicate fastest lap)

Year	Team	1	2	3	4	5	6	7	8	9	10	11	12	13	14	15	16	17	18	19	20	21	22	23	24	25	26	27	28	DC	Points
2024	R-ace GP	MIS; 1; 25	MIS; 2; 11	MIS; 3; 31†	IMO; 1; 12	IMO; 2; 32†	IMO; 3; 7	VLL; 1; 27†	VLL; 2 Ret	VLL; 3; 22	MUG; 1 WD	MUG; 2 WD	MUG; 3 WD	LEC; 1	LEC; 2	LEC; 3	CAT; 1 Ret	CAT; 2; 23	CAT; 3 Ret	MNZ; 1; 10	MNZ; 2; 8	MNZ; 3; 12								18th	11
2025	US Racing	MIS1; 1; 7	MIS1; 2 Ret	MIS1; 3	MIS1; 4; 28	VLL; 1; 22†	VLL; 2	VLL; 3; 11	VLL; 4; 9	MNZ; 1; 5	MNZ; 2; 4	MNZ; 3; 2	MUG; 1; 5	MUG; 2; 7	MUG; 3; 6	IMO; 1; 22	IMO; 2 C	IMO; 3; 29†	CAT; 1; 5	CAT; 2; 6	CAT; 3 C	MIS2; 1; 4	MIS2; 2	MIS2; 3; 3	MIS2; 4; 3	MIS2; 5; 22				8th	132
2026	US Racing	MIS1; 1	**MIS1**; **2**; 1	**MIS1**; **3**; 29†	MIS1; 4; 5	VLL; 1; 1	VLL; 2	VLL; 3; 1	**VLL**; **4**; 1	MNZ; 1; 1	MNZ; 2	MNZ; 3; 1	**MNZ**; **4**; 1	MUG1; 1; 3	MUG1; 2	MUG1; 3; 8	MUG1; 4; 2	IMO; 1	**IMO**; **2**; 1	**IMO**; **3**; 2	**IMO**; **4**; 1	MIS2; 1; 12	MIS2; 2	MIS2; 3; 12	MIS2; 4 Ret	**MUG2**; **1**; 1	MUG2; 2	MUG2; 3; 1	**MUG2**; **4**; 1	1st	476

=== Complete Euro 4 Championship results ===
(key) (Races in bold indicate pole position; races in italics indicate fastest lap)

Year	Team	1	2	3	4	5	6	7	8	9	DC	Points
2024	R-ace GP	MUG; 1	MUG; 2	MUG; 3	RBR; 1 Ret	RBR; 2; 17	RBR; 3; 17	MNZ; 1 Ret	MNZ; 2; 21	MNZ; 3; 8	20th	4
2026	US Racing	VLL; 1; 1	VLL; 2; 3	**VLL**; **3**; 1	LEC; 1; 4	LEC; 2; 3	LEC; 3; 28	MNZ; 1; 9	MNZ; 2; 2	MNZ; 3; 1	2nd	190

=== Complete Formula Winter Series results ===
(key) (Races in bold indicate pole position) (Races in italics indicate fastest lap)

Year	Team	1	2	3	4	5	6	7	8	9	10	11	12	DC	Points
2025	US Racing	POR; 1; 10	POR; 2; 4	POR; 3; 5	CRT; 1	CRT; 2	CRT; 3	ARA; 1	ARA; 2	ARA; 3	CAT; 1; 8	CAT; 2; 10	CAT; 3; 9	13th	32
