= 2026 Italian F4 Championship =

Formula 4 motor racing championship

The 2026 F4 Italian Championship powered by Abarth was the thirteenth season of the Italian F4 Championship.

== Teams and drivers ==
Team	No.	Driver	Class	Rounds
(Italy) Prema Racing	1	(Spain) Christian Costoya	R	All
(Italy) Prema Racing	4	(United Kingdom) Roman Kamyab	R	2–6
(Italy) Prema Racing	5	(Italy) Filippo Sala	R	7
(Italy) Prema Racing	10	(Turkey) Alp Aksoy	R	All
(Italy) Prema Racing	19	(Italy) Niccolò Maccagnani		1–5
(Italy) Prema Racing	25	(Switzerland) Georgiy Zasov	R	6
(Italy) Prema Racing	27	(Ukraine) Oleksandr Bondarev		1–4
(Italy) Prema Racing	64	(Italy) Ginevra Panzeri	W	7
(Italy) Prema Racing	69	(Italy) Kingsley Zheng (Note: Zheng is a Chinese driver competing under an Italian licence.)	R	All
(Italy) Prema Racing	73	(Bulgaria) Lyuboslav Ruykov	R	5–7
(Italy) Prema Racing	98	(Romania) David Cosma Cristofor		All
(Netherlands) Van Amersfoort Racing	3	(Poland) Aleksander Ruta		All
(Netherlands) Van Amersfoort Racing	53	(Brazil) Pedro Lima		All
(Netherlands) Van Amersfoort Racing	87	(United Kingdom) Thomas Bearman		All
(Germany) PHM Racing	6	(Monaco) Oscar Repetto (Note: Repetto is a New Zealand and Monégasque driver competing under a Monégasque licence.)	R	All
(Germany) PHM Racing	28	(Italy) Iacopo Martinese	R	1–6
(Germany) PHM Racing	47	(Estonia) Roland Kuklane	R	All
(Germany) PHM Racing	60	(Austria) Emma Felbermayr	W	1, 3–7
(Germany) PHM Racing	81	(Italy) Alexander Chartier (Note: Chartier is a Canadian driver competing under an Italian licence.)	R	1, 3–7
(Germany) US Racing	7	(Finland) Luka Sammalisto		All
(Germany) US Racing	9	(Spain) Edu Robinson		All
(Germany) US Racing	13	(Australia) Noah Killion		All
(Germany) US Racing	17	(Italy) Oleksandr Savinkov (Note: Savinkov is a Russo-Ukrainian driver competing under an Italian licence.)		All
(Germany) US Racing	28	(Italy) Iacopo Martinese	R	7
(Germany) US Racing	29	(Italy) Ludovico Busso		All
(Germany) US Racing	46	(India) Ary Bansal		All
(Germany) US Racing	62	(Germany) Arjen Kräling		1–6
(Italy) Alpha 54 Racing	11	(Argentina) Thiago Palotini	R	1–2
(Italy) Alpha 54 Racing	54	(Argentina) Federico Díaz		1–4
(Italy) Alpha 54 Racing	55	(Argentina) Ignacio Díaz		3
(Italy) Alpha 54 Racing	56	(Kyrgyzstan) Kirill Kutskov (Note: Kutskov and Severiukhin are Russian, but they compete under a Kyrgyz licence as Russian national emblems were banned by the FIA following the Russian invasion of Ukraine.)		4
(Italy) Alpha 54 Racing	71	(Argentina) Joaquin Rubino		5–7
(Italy) Alpha 54 Racing	72	(Argentina) Bautista Acosta		5
(Italy) Alpha 54 Racing	75	(Argentina) Joaquin Pagola	R	6–7
(Italy) Trident Motorsport	16	(Brazil) Bernardo Bernoldi (Note: Bernoldi is a Brazilian driver competing under an Italian licence.)	R	All
(Italy) Trident Motorsport	48	(China) Yibei Sun	R	7
(Italy) Trident Motorsport	50	(Switzerland) Florentin Hattemer	R	All
(Italy) Trident Motorsport	51	(Brazil) Augustus Toniolo	R	All
(Italy) Trident Motorsport	67	(Czech Republic) Dominik Šimek	R	All
(Italy) Trident Motorsport	73	(Bulgaria) Lyuboslav Ruykov	R	1–4
(Italy) Trident Motorsport	77	(United Arab Emirates) Lucas Pasquinetti		6–7
(Germany) Mathilda Racing	18	(Germany) Mathilda Paatz	W	7
(Switzerland) Jenzer Motorsport	20	(Czech Republic) Teo Borenstein		4–6
(Switzerland) Jenzer Motorsport	21	(Switzerland) Levi Arn	R	All
(Switzerland) Jenzer Motorsport	22	(Germany) Elia Weiss		All
(Switzerland) Jenzer Motorsport	23	(Kyrgyzstan) Artem Severiukhin		2
(Switzerland) Jenzer Motorsport	24	(Mexico) Nicolás Cortés		All
(Switzerland) Jenzer Motorsport	25	(Switzerland) Georgiy Zasov	R	1
(Switzerland) Jenzer Motorsport	26	(Qatar) Bader Al Sulaiti		All
(France) R-ace GP	30	(France) Andy Consani		All
(France) R-ace GP	31	(Canada) Jensen Burnett	R	5–7
(France) R-ace GP	32	(Australia) James Anagnostiadis	R	5–6
(France) R-ace GP	32	(United Kingdom) Jesse Phillips	R	7
(France) R-ace GP	33	(Hungary) Tamás Gender	R	1–6
(France) R-ace GP	34	(United Kingdom) Kenzo Craigie	R	All
(France) R-ace GP	35	(United States) Payton Westcott	W	1, 3–7
(France) R-ace GP	42	(United Kingdom) Emily Cotty	W	1–4
(Italy) Cram Motorsport	36	(Germany) Simon Rechenmacher	R	3–4
(Italy) Cram Motorsport	38	(Brazil) Rafaela Ferreira	W	1, 3–6
(Italy) Cram Motorsport	40	(United States) Andre Rodriguez		1–3, 5–7
(Italy) Cram Motorsport	70	(United States) Dean Pedersen	R	5–7
(Romania) Real Racing	41	(Denmark) Knud Nielsen	R	All
(Romania) Real Racing	43	(Romania) Zoe Florescu	R W	4
(San Marino) AKM Motorsport	44	(Costa Rica) Evan Michelini	R	1–3
(San Marino) AKM Motorsport	63	(Netherlands) Rocco Coronel	R	5
(San Marino) AKM Motorsport	66	(Australia) George Proudford-Nalder	R	3
(San Marino) AKM Motorsport	88	(Italy) Vittorio Orsini	R	All
(San Marino) AKM Motorsport	99	(Brazil) Fabricio Fogaça	R	All
(Argentina) Scuderia Buell	52	(Argentina) Joaquín Rubino		4
(Italy) PA Racing (Note: The No. 64 PA Racing entry was run by AS Motorsport at rounds 1–2)	64	(Italy) Ginevra Panzeri	W	1–2, 4–5
(Italy) Technorace	78	(Italy) Antonio Errigo		7
(Italy) Technorace	79	(Saudi Arabia) Albassam Musaad	R	7
(Switzerland) Maffi Racing	80	(Netherlands) Rosanne den Drijver	R W	3
(Switzerland) Maffi Racing	82	(Denmark) Nikolaj Dyrved		7
(Switzerland) Maffi Racing	83	(Denmark) David Walther		All
(Switzerland) Maffi Racing	84	(Switzerland) Andreas Lo Bue		4
(Switzerland) Maffi Racing	86	(Poland) Igor Polak	R	1–2, 4–7
(Hungary) Zengő Motorsport	85	(Hungary) Benett Gáspár		3

Icon	Legend
R	Rookie
W	Woman Trophy

- Bernardo Bernoldi was scheduled to compete for Prema Racing, but later moved to Trident.

== Race calendar and results ==
The calendar was initially revealed in early October 2025. For the first time since the 2017 season, all rounds will be held in Italy as part of ACI Racing Weekend events. On 9 January 2026, the final round at Mugello was moved back a week.

Round		Circuit	Date	Pole position	Fastest lap	Winning driver	Winning team	Secondary class winner	Supporting
1	R1	Misano World Circuit	9 May	(Turkey) Alp Aksoy	(Turkey) Alp Aksoy	(Turkey) Alp Aksoy (Note: Niccolò Maccagnani originally won the race, but later received a 10-second time penalty for starting his engine before the permitted 1-minute signal on the grid. Alp Aksoy, initially classified second, thus inherited the win.)	(Italy) Prema Racing	R: (Turkey) Alp Aksoy; W: (United Kingdom) Emily Cotty	TCR World Tour; Italian GT Championship Endurance Cup; Porsche Carrera Cup Italia; GT4 Italian Series
1	R2	Misano World Circuit	9 May	(Finland) Luka Sammalisto	(Finland) Luka Sammalisto	(Finland) Luka Sammalisto	(Germany) US Racing	R: (Turkey) Alp Aksoy; W: (United States) Payton Westcott	TCR World Tour; Italian GT Championship Endurance Cup; Porsche Carrera Cup Italia; GT4 Italian Series
1	R3	Misano World Circuit	10 May	(Finland) Luka Sammalisto	(Finland) Luka Sammalisto	(Italy) Niccolò Maccagnani	(Italy) Prema Racing	R: (Monaco) Oscar Repetto; W: (Austria) Emma Felbermayr	TCR World Tour; Italian GT Championship Endurance Cup; Porsche Carrera Cup Italia; GT4 Italian Series
1	R4	Misano World Circuit	10 May	(Turkey) Alp Aksoy	(Finland) Luka Sammalisto	(Turkey) Alp Aksoy	(Italy) Prema Racing	R: (Turkey) Alp Aksoy; W: (United States) Payton Westcott	TCR World Tour; Italian GT Championship Endurance Cup; Porsche Carrera Cup Italia; GT4 Italian Series
2	R1	Vallelunga Circuit	23 May	(Romania) David Cosma Cristofor	(Finland) Luka Sammalisto	(Finland) Luka Sammalisto	(Germany) US Racing	R: (Turkey) Alp Aksoy; W: (United Kingdom) Emily Cotty	Italian GT Championship Sprint Cup; TCR Italy Touring Car Championship
2	R2	Vallelunga Circuit	23 May	(Spain) Edu Robinson	(Germany) Arjen Kräling	(Spain) Edu Robinson	(Germany) US Racing	R: (Turkey) Alp Aksoy; W: (United Kingdom) Emily Cotty	Italian GT Championship Sprint Cup; TCR Italy Touring Car Championship
2	R3	Vallelunga Circuit	24 May	(Spain) Edu Robinson	(United Kingdom) Kenzo Craigie	(Finland) Luka Sammalisto	(Germany) US Racing	R: (United Kingdom) Kenzo Craigie; W: (Italy) Ginevra Panzeri	Italian GT Championship Sprint Cup; TCR Italy Touring Car Championship
2	R4	Vallelunga Circuit	24 May	(Finland) Luka Sammalisto	(Finland) Luka Sammalisto	(Finland) Luka Sammalisto	(Germany) US Racing	R: (Turkey) Alp Aksoy; W: (Italy) Ginevra Panzeri	Italian GT Championship Sprint Cup; TCR Italy Touring Car Championship
3	R1	Monza Circuit	20 June	(Australia) Noah Killion	(Switzerland) Levi Arn	(Finland) Luka Sammalisto	(Germany) US Racing	R: (Switzerland) Levi Arn; W: (Netherlands) Rosanne den Drijver	Formula Regional European Championship; Italian GT Championship Endurance Cup; TCR Italy Touring Car Championship; Porsche Carrera Cup Italia
3	R2	Monza Circuit	20 June	(Spain) Edu Robinson	(France) Andy Consani	(Australia) Noah Killion	(Germany) US Racing	R: (Turkey) Alp Aksoy; W: (Austria) Emma Felbermayr	Formula Regional European Championship; Italian GT Championship Endurance Cup; TCR Italy Touring Car Championship; Porsche Carrera Cup Italia
3	R3	Monza Circuit	21 June	(Spain) Edu Robinson	(Spain) Edu Robinson	(Finland) Luka Sammalisto	(Germany) US Racing	R: (Italy) Alexander Chartier; W: (Austria) Emma Felbermayr	Formula Regional European Championship; Italian GT Championship Endurance Cup; TCR Italy Touring Car Championship; Porsche Carrera Cup Italia
3	R4	Monza Circuit	21 June	(Finland) Luka Sammalisto	(Italy) Oleksandr Savinkov	(Finland) Luka Sammalisto	(Germany) US Racing	R: (Spain) Christian Costoya; W: (Austria) Emma Felbermayr	Formula Regional European Championship; Italian GT Championship Endurance Cup; TCR Italy Touring Car Championship; Porsche Carrera Cup Italia
4	R1	Mugello Circuit	25 July	(Romania) David Cosma Cristofor	(Finland) Luka Sammalisto	(Italy) Niccolò Maccagnani	(Italy) Prema Racing	R: (United Kingdom) Kenzo Craigie; W: (United States) Payton Westcott	Italian GT Championship Sprint Cup; TCR Italy Touring Car Championship; GT4 Italian Series
4	R2	Mugello Circuit	25 July	(Germany) Elia Weiss	(France) Andy Consani	(India) Ary Bansal	(Germany) US Racing	R: (Spain) Christian Costoya; W: (Austria) Emma Felbermayr	Italian GT Championship Sprint Cup; TCR Italy Touring Car Championship; GT4 Italian Series
4	R3	Mugello Circuit	26 July	(Germany) Elia Weiss	(Finland) Luka Sammalisto	(France) Andy Consani	(France) R-ace GP	R: (United Kingdom) Kenzo Craigie; W: (Austria) Emma Felbermayr	Italian GT Championship Sprint Cup; TCR Italy Touring Car Championship; GT4 Italian Series
4	R4	Mugello Circuit	26 July	(Italy) Niccolò Maccagnani	(Finland) Luka Sammalisto	(United Kingdom) Kenzo Craigie	(France) R-ace GP	R: (United Kingdom) Kenzo Craigie; W: (Austria) Emma Felbermayr	Italian GT Championship Sprint Cup; TCR Italy Touring Car Championship; GT4 Italian Series
5	R1	Imola Circuit	5 September	(Spain) Edu Robinson	(Spain) Edu Robinson	(Spain) Edu Robinson	(Germany) US Racing	R: (United Kingdom) Kenzo Craigie; W: (Italy) Ginevra Panzeri	Formula Regional European Championship; Italian GT Championship Endurance Cup; GT4 Italian Series
5	R2	Imola Circuit	5 September	(Finland) Luka Sammalisto	(Poland) Aleksander Ruta	(Finland) Luka Sammalisto	(Germany) US Racing	R: (Brazil) Augustus Toniolo; W: (Austria) Emma Felbermayr	Formula Regional European Championship; Italian GT Championship Endurance Cup; GT4 Italian Series
5	R3	Imola Circuit	6 September	(Finland) Luka Sammalisto	(Canada) Jensen Burnett	(United Kingdom) Kenzo Craigie	(France) R-ace GP	R: (United Kingdom) Kenzo Craigie; W: (Austria) Emma Felbermayr	Formula Regional European Championship; Italian GT Championship Endurance Cup; GT4 Italian Series
5	R4	Imola Circuit	6 September	(Finland) Luka Sammalisto	(Finland) Luka Sammalisto	(Finland) Luka Sammalisto	(Germany) US Racing	R: (United Kingdom) Kenzo Craigie; W: (Austria) Emma Felbermayr	Formula Regional European Championship; Italian GT Championship Endurance Cup; GT4 Italian Series
6	R1	Misano World Circuit	19 September	(India) Ary Bansal	(Italy) Oleksandr Savinkov	(India) Ary Bansal	(Germany) US Racing	R: (Turkey) Alp Aksoy; W: no participants	TCR Italy Touring Car Championship; Porsche Carrera Cup Italia
6	R2	Misano World Circuit	19 September	(Czech Republic) Teo Borenstein	(United Kingdom) Kenzo Craigie	(Spain) Christian Costoya	(Italy) Prema Racing	R: (Spain) Christian Costoya; W: (Austria) Emma Felbermayr	TCR Italy Touring Car Championship; Porsche Carrera Cup Italia
6	R3	Misano World Circuit	20 September	(Spain) Christian Costoya (Note: Teo Borenstein and Florentin Hattemer set the fastest and second fastest times in qualifying respectively, but had to serve grid penalties for incidents in a previous race. Christian Costoya, who set the third fastest time, was promoted to pole position.)	(Germany) Elia Weiss	(Spain) Christian Costoya	(Italy) Prema Racing	R: (Spain) Christian Costoya; W: (United States) Payton Westcott	TCR Italy Touring Car Championship; Porsche Carrera Cup Italia
6	R4	Misano World Circuit	20 September	(Spain) Christian Costoya	(United Kingdom) Kenzo Craigie	(Spain) Christian Costoya	(Italy) Prema Racing	R: (Spain) Christian Costoya; W: (Austria) Emma Felbermayr	TCR Italy Touring Car Championship; Porsche Carrera Cup Italia
7	R1	Mugello Circuit	31 October	(Finland) Luka Sammalisto	(France) Andy Consani	(Finland) Luka Sammalisto	(Germany) US Racing	R: (Spain) Christian Costoya; W: (United States) Payton Westcott	Italian GT Championship Endurance Cup; TCR Italy Touring Car Championship; Porsche Carrera Cup Italia
7	R2	Mugello Circuit	31 October	(Romania) David Cosma Cristofor	(United Kingdom) Kenzo Craigie	(Finland) Luka Sammalisto	(Germany) US Racing	R: (United Kingdom) Kenzo Craigie; W: (Austria) Emma Felbermayr	Italian GT Championship Endurance Cup; TCR Italy Touring Car Championship; Porsche Carrera Cup Italia
7	R3	Mugello Circuit	1 November	(Romania) David Cosma Cristofor	(Spain) Edu Robinson	(Germany) Elia Weiss	(Switzerland) Jenzer Motorsport	R: (United Kingdom) Kenzo Craigie; W: (United States) Payton Westcott	Italian GT Championship Endurance Cup; TCR Italy Touring Car Championship; Porsche Carrera Cup Italia
7	R4	Mugello Circuit	1 November	(Finland) Luka Sammalisto	(Germany) Elia Weiss	(Finland) Luka Sammalisto	(Germany) US Racing	R: (United Kingdom) Kenzo Craigie; W: (Austria) Emma Felbermayr	Italian GT Championship Endurance Cup; TCR Italy Touring Car Championship; Porsche Carrera Cup Italia

== Championship standings ==
The final classification for individual standings were obtained by summing up the scores of the 16 best results obtained by a driver during the season. Points were awarded to the top 15 classified finishers in each race as follows:

Position	**1st**	**2nd**	**3rd**	**4th**	**5th**	**6th**	**7th**	**8th**	**9th**	**10th**	**11th**	**12th**	**13th**	**14th**	**15th**
Points	30	26	22	20	18	16	14	12	10	9	8	6	4	2	1

=== Drivers' Championship ===
Pos	Driver	MIS1 (Italy)				VLL (Italy)				MNZ (Italy)				MUG1 (Italy)				IMO (Italy)				MIS2 (Italy)				MUG2 (Italy)				Pts
Pos	Driver	R1	R2	R3	R4	R1	R2	R3	R4	R1	R2	R3	R4	R1	R2	R3	R4	R1	R2	R3	R4	R1	R2	R3	R4	R1	R2	R3	R4	Pts
1	(Finland) Luka Sammalisto		**1**	**29**†	5	1		1	**1**	1		1	**1**	3		8	2		**1**	**2**	**1**	12		12	Ret	**1**	1		**1**	452
2	(Turkey) Alp Aksoy	**1**	3		**1**	3	4		4	20	3		33†	7		6	5	6		7	31	2	3		2	9	8		8	330
3	(United Kingdom) Kenzo Craigie	24†	13		13	20		5	8	7	6		Ret	2		4	1	2		1	2	Ret	2		7		2	5	4	326
4	(Romania) David Cosma Cristofor		2	2	10	**8**	2		3		2	3	8	**4**	3		9	8		4	9		9	19	13		**4**	**2**	3	324
5	(Spain) Edu Robinson	12	4		14		**1**	**2**	2		**5**	**21**	9	14		24	28	**1**	3		3		6	3	3		7	4	24	306
6	(India) Ary Bansal	3		8	2	10		6	9	2		13	5		1	10	6		5	3	6	**1**	28†		8	10	13		Ret	292
7	(Spain) Christian Costoya	14		18	15		Ret	Ret	DNQ	6	10		4	8	6		13		12	5	29		1	**1**	**1**	2		9	14	232
8	(Italy) Oleksandr Savinkov	9		4	4	2		11	5	3		18	2	Ret	5		18	14	10		26	6		13	32†		12	7	11	227
9	(United Kingdom) Thomas Bearman	7	9		Ret	9	5		7	12		2	15		7	11	12	3	4		4	25		2	17	29	15		31†	216
10	(Italy) Ludovico Busso		8	6	25		10	7	11		4	20	7		13	30†	17	4	DSQ		7	3		14	9	4	3		Ret	207
11	(Poland) Aleksander Ruta		19	11	11	16		Ret	20	30†		8	11	10	11		Ret		2	9	5	5	7		5	12	6		7	193
12	(France) Andy Consani	Ret		5	7	21	21		DNQ	27†	22		DNQ		22	1	8	5		6	8		20	15	18	5		3	5	179
13	(Italy) Niccolò Maccagnani	4		1	6		24†	Ret	DNQ	24		6	12	1	2		**3**	28	8		25									178
14	(Germany) Elia Weiss		WD	WD	WD		19	10	Ret	8		7	6		**Ret**	**Ret**	DNQ		11	10	Ret		21	4	11	3		1	2	174
15	(Australia) Noah Killion		26	7	29	4	Ret		25	**25**	1		3	11		7	15		22	30	DNQ	10	5		4	13		14	Ret	162
16	(Brazil) Augustus Toniolo	Ret	15		Ret		Ret	25†	DNQ	14	12		19	12		14	25		6	8	10		4	5	6	6	5		6	158
17	(Denmark) David Walther		7	3	3		12	3	6	29†	18		13	30†		13	Ret	23	20		DNQ	4	14		19		9	DSQ	27	142
18	(Ukraine) Oleksandr Bondarev	2	5		9	11		9	Ret	28†	15		Ret		4	3	4													135
19	(Qatar) Bader Al Sulaiti	6	10		12	6	22		Ret		13	11	18	26		2	7	29†		16	27	9	26		20	31†	11		23	117
20	(Germany) Arjen Kräling	5	6		8		3	22	10		7	4	32†	18	31†		Ret	Ret	15		16		13	17	15					117
21	(Switzerland) Florentin Hattemer	8		12	31	7	8		14		11	10	30	6	10		19		23	22	DNQ	Ret		7	14		16	12	12	116
22	(Monaco) Oscar Repetto		11	10	20		6	8	12	21		19	DNQ	5	8		10	26	26		DNQ	19		Ret	DNQ	27		11	Ret	98
23	(Switzerland) Levi Arn	18		13	16	12		23	18	4	Ret		31	22		9	14	19		13	13	8		16	31†		Ret	6	16	78
24	(Czech Republic) Dominik Šimek		28	23	DNQ	13	20		17	9		26	22		9	5	11	15		14	11	21		8	30†	30†		Ret	DNQ	73
25	(Italy) Iacopo Martinese	21		20	22	14		14	22	11	19		28		15	16	26	20		25	DNQ	7	12		12	7	22		9	63
26	(Denmark) Knud Nielsen	10		19	19		9	12	15		8	9	14		19	12	21	21		19	18	17	15		26		20	19	29	57
27	(Italy) Kingsley Zheng	Ret		14	18	27	7		19	23	21		DNQ	13		Ret	22	10		11	Ret		10	Ret	16		10	30	15	56
28	(United Kingdom) Roman Kamyab					5		Ret	13		20	Ret	DNQ		18	23	30	9	13		12	22		11	21					50
29	(Mexico) Nicolás Cortés		14	16	Ret	26		13	16	19		28†	DNQ	17		15	20	Ret		29	DNQ		11	10	22	8		13	10	49
30	(Canada) Jensen Burnett																		31	12	Ret	13		6	10		Ret	8	28	47
31	(Brazil) Pedro Lima		12	9	30	Ret	Ret		DNQ		Ret	12	20	24		18	23	11		15	Ret		30†	26	DNQ	11	14		30†	41
32	(Bulgaria) Lyuboslav Ruykov	Ret	18		17		11	16	21	Ret		Ret	DNQ	15	17		Ret	7	7		14		27	27	DNQ		25	17	17	39
33	(Germany) Simon Rechenmacher									5	26		10		12	19	16													33
34	(Italy) Alexander Chartier	Ret		WD	DNQ						14	5	17	16		22	31		14	Ret	30	15		20	Ret	14	27		13	29
35	(United States) Dean Pedersen																	12	9		22	24	8		Ret		18	18	Ret	28
36	(Czech Republic) Teo Borenstein													9	Ret		Ret	22		17	15		**22**	9	24					21
37	(Kyrgyzstan) Artem Severiukhin					18		4	Ret																					20
38	(Brazil) Bernardo Bernoldi	13	20		24		18	15	23	13	9		16	19	29		29	27	19		20	26†		Ret	DNQ	17	19		25	19
39	(United States) Payton Westcott	17	16		21					26		15	26	20	23		DNQ	18	21		21		18	18	Ret	15		10	22	11
40	(United States) Andre Rodriguez		17	27	Ret	17		18	24	10		24	21					16	17		23	23		25	DNQ	24		21	DNQ	9
41	(Estonia) Roland Kuklane	11		17	28		15	24†	29		16	Ret	Ret		20	20	DNQ		25	24	DNQ	Ret		22	DNQ		28	16	18	9
42	(Switzerland) Georgiy Zasov		Ret	21	DNQ																	11	17		29					8
43	(Austria) Emma Felbermayr	22		15	Ret						17	14	24		14	21	27		18	23	19		16	21	25	18	17		19	5
44	(Poland) Igor Polak	19		26	26	23		17	27					21		28	DNQ	13	27		24	16	23		27	23		28	DNQ	4
45	(Argentina) Federico Díaz	Ret		22	DNQ	25	13		Ret		28	25	DNQ		21	25	DNQ													4
46	(Italy) Vittorio Orsini		24	Ret	DNQ		23	21	DNQ	15		16	27	28		26	DNQ	24		21	DNQ	14	32†		23	22	24		DNQ	3
47	(Hungary) Tamás Gender		27	25	DNQ	22	14		26	16	31		29	25	28		DNQ		24	31†	DNQ									2
48	(United Kingdom) Emily Cotty	15	22		23	19	16		30		27	Ret	DNQ	Ret		27	DNQ													1
49	(United Kingdom) Jesse Phillips																									16		15	20	1
50	(Costa Rica) Evan Michelini		21	28	DNQ	15	17		Ret		29	17	23																	1
51	(Netherlands) Rocco Coronel																		16	18	17									0
52	(Kyrgyzstan) Kirill Kutskov														16	17	24													0
53	(Brazil) Fabricio Fogaça	16	30		27		Ret	20	DNQ	22	24		DNQ	27	30		DNQ	Ret		28	DNQ	Ret	19		DNQ	28		Ret	DNQ	0
54	(Italy) Ginevra Panzeri	20	29		DNQ	24		19	28						27	Ret	DNQ	17	28		28					Ret		27	DNQ	0
55	(Netherlands) Rosanne den Drijver									17		23	25																	0
56	(United Arab Emirates) Lucas Pasquinetti																					18	25		28	21		26	DNQ	0
57	(Hungary) Benett Gáspár									18		22	DNQ																	0
58	(Germany) Mathilda Paatz																									19	23		26	0
59	(Australia) James Anagnostiadis																		30	20	32†	20		24	DNQ					0
60	(Italy) Filippo Sala																									20		23	21	0
61	(Italy) Antonio Errigo																										21	20	DNQ	0
62	(China) Yibei Sun																									26		22	DNQ	0
63	(Brazil) Rafaela Ferreira	23†	23		DNQ						25	Ret	DNQ	29	26		DNQ	25		26	DNQ		29	28†	DNQ					0
64	(Argentina) Joaquín Rubino													WD	WD	WD	WD		29	27	DNQ		31†	23	DNQ	25	29		DNQ	0
65	(Switzerland) Andreas Lo Bue													23	25		DNQ													0
66	(Australia) George Proudford-Nalder									Ret	23		DNQ																	0
67	(Argentina) Joaquin Pagola																					Ret	24		DNQ		26	24	DNQ	0
68	(Argentina) Thiago Palotini		25	24	DNQ	WD	WD	WD	WD																					0
69	(Romania) Zoe Florescu														24	29†	DNQ													0
70	(Saudi Arabia) Albassam Musaad																										30	25	DNQ	0
71	(Argentina) Ignacio Díaz										30	27	DNQ																	0
72	(Denmark) Nikolaj Dyrved																										31	29	DNQ	0
—	(Argentina) Bautista Acosta																		DNS	DNS	DNQ									0
Pos	Driver	MIS1 (Italy)				VLL (Italy)				MNZ (Italy)				MUG1 (Italy)				IMO (Italy)				MIS2 (Italy)				MUG2 (Italy)				Pts

Colour	Result
Gold	Winner
Silver	Second place
Bronze	Third place
Green	Points classification
Blue	Non-points classification
Blue	Non-classified finish (NC)
Purple	Retired, not classified (Ret)
Red	Did not qualify (DNQ)
Red	Did not pre-qualify (DNPQ)
Black	Disqualified (DSQ)
White	Did not start (DNS)
White	Withdrew (WD)
White	Race cancelled (C)
Blank	Did not practice (DNP)
Blank	Did not arrive (DNA)
Blank	Excluded (EX)

**Bold** – Pole
Italics – Fastest Lap
† — Did not finish, but classified

=== Rookies' Championship ===
Pos	Driver	MIS1 (Italy)				VLL (Italy)				MNZ (Italy)				MUG1 (Italy)				IMO (Italy)				MIS2 (Italy)				MUG2 (Italy)				Pts
Pos	Driver	R1	R2	R3	R4	R1	R2	R3	R4	R1	R2	R3	R4	R1	R2	R3	R4	R1	R2	R3	R4	R1	R2	R3	R4	R1	R2	R3	R4	Pts
1	(United Kingdom) Kenzo Craigie	11†	3		2	8		1	2	4	2		Ret	1		1	1	1		1	1	Ret	2		4		1	1	1	446
2	(Turkey) Alp Aksoy	1	1		1	1	1		1	12	1		15†	4		3	2	2		3	14	1	3		2	4	3		3	428
3	(Spain) Christian Costoya	6		6	3		Ret	Ret	DNQ	3	5		1	5	1		5		4	2	12		1	1	1	1		4	7	376
4	(Brazil) Augustus Toniolo	Ret	4		Ret		Ret	12	DNQ	8	7		6	6		6	11		1	4	2		4	2	3	2	2		2	324
5	(Switzerland) Florentin Hattemer	2		2	14	3	4		5		6	3	13	3	4		8		9	13	DNQ	Ret		4	7		5	6	5	300
6	(Monaco) Oscar Repetto		2	1	8		2	2	3	13		6	DNQ	2	2		3	13	12		DNQ	10		Ret	DNQ	12		5	Ret	279
7	(Switzerland) Levi Arn	8		3	4	4		10	8	1	Ret		14	12		4	6	9		7	5	3		7	15†		Ret	2	9	275
8	(Denmark) Knud Nielsen	3		7	7		5	3	6		3	2	3		9	5	9	11		10	8	9	8		11		8	11	16	260
9	(Czech Republic) Dominik Šimek		11	10	DNQ	5	11		7	5		8	7		3	2	4	8		8	3	12		5	14†	14†		Ret	DNQ	239
10	(Italy) Iacopo Martinese	10		8	9	6		4	11	6	10		11		6	7	12	10		15	DNQ	2	7		6	3	9		4	239
11	(Bulgaria) Lyuboslav Ruykov	Ret	5		5		6	6	10	Ret		Ret	DNQ	8	7		Ret	3	2		6		13	11	DNQ		11	9	10	206
12	(Italy) Kingsley Zheng	Ret		4	6	11	3		9	15	12		DNQ	7		Ret	10	5		5	Ret		6	Ret	8		4	16	8	202
13	(Italy) Bernardo Bernoldi	5	6		10		10	5	12	7	4		4	10	13		13	14	8		9	15†		Ret	DNQ	7	7		14	197
14	(Italy) Alexander Chartier	Ret		WD	DNQ						8	1	5	9		10	15		6	Ret	13	7		8	Ret	5	13		6	164
15	(United Kingdom) Roman Kamyab					2		Ret	4		11	Ret	DNQ		8	11	14	4	5		4	13		6	9					164
16	(Estonia) Roland Kuklane	4		5	13		8	11	15		9	Ret	Ret		10	9	DNQ		11	14	DNQ	Ret		9	DNQ		14	8	11	134
17	(Italy) Vittorio Orsini		8	Ret	DNQ		12	9	DNQ	9		4	10	15		12	DNQ	12		12	DNQ	6	14†		10	9	10		DNQ	132
18	(Poland) Igor Polak	9		13	11	10		7	14					11		13	DNQ	7	13		11	8	11		12	10		15	DNQ	121
19	(Canada) Jensen Burnett																		15	6	Ret	5		3	5		Ret	3	15	98
20	(Germany) Simon Rechenmacher									2	15		2		5	8	7													97
21	(United States) Dean Pedersen																	6	3		10	14	5		Ret		6	10	Ret	92
22	(Hungary) Tamás Gender		10	12	DNQ	9	7		13	10	17		12	13	12		DNQ		10	17†	DNQ									77
23	(Costa Rica) Evan Michelini		7	14	DNQ	7	9		Ret		16	5	8																	70
24	(Brazil) Fabricio Fogaça	7	12		12		Ret	8	DNQ	14	14		DNQ	14	14		DNQ	Ret		16	DNQ	Ret	10		DNQ	13		Ret	DNQ	59
25	(Switzerland) Georgiy Zasov		Ret	9	DNQ																	4	9		13					44
26	(Netherlands) Rocco Coronel																		7	9	7									38
27	(United Kingdom) Jesse Phillips																									6		7	12	36
28	(Netherlands) Rosanne den Drijver									11		7	9																	32
29	(Australia) James Anagnostiadis																		14	11	15	11		10	DNQ					28
30	(Italy) Filippo Sala																									8		13	13	20
31	(Argentina) Thiago Palotini		9	11	DNQ	WD	WD	WD	WD																		18			
32	(China) Yibei Sun																									11		12	DNQ	14
33	(Argentina) Joaquin Pagola																					Ret	12		DNQ		12	14	DNQ	14
34	(Romania) Zoe Florescu														11	14	DNQ													10
35	(Australia) George Proudford-Nalder									Ret	13		DNQ																	4
Pos	Driver	MIS1 (Italy)				VLL (Italy)				MNZ (Italy)				MUG1 (Italy)				IMO (Italy)				MIS2 (Italy)				MUG2 (Italy)				Pts

=== Women's Championship ===
Pos	Driver	MIS1 (Italy)				VLL (Italy)				MNZ (Italy)				MUG1 (Italy)				IMO (Italy)				MIS2 (Italy)				MUG2 (Italy)				Pts
Pos	Driver	R1	R2	R3	R4	R1	R2	R3	R4	R1	R2	R3	R4	R1	R2	R3	R4	R1	R2	R3	R4	R1	R2	R3	R4	R1	R2	R3	R4	Pts
1	(Austria) Emma Felbermayr	4		1	Ret						1	1	1		1	1	1		1	1	1		1	2	1	2	1		1	472
2	(United States) Payton Westcott	2	1		1					2		2	3	1	2		DNQ	2	2		2		2	1	Ret	1		1	2	436
3	(Italy) Ginevra Panzeri	3	4		DNQ	2		1	1						5	Ret	DNQ	1	3		3					Ret		2	DNQ	246
4	(United Kingdom) Emily Cotty	1	2		2	1	1		2		3	Ret	DNQ	Ret		2	DNQ													216
5	(Brazil) Rafaela Ferreira	5†	3		DNQ						2	Ret	DNQ	2	4		DNQ	3		2	DNQ		3	3†	DNQ					204
6	(Netherlands) Rosanne den Drijver									1		3	2																	78
7	(Germany) Mathilda Paatz																									3	2		3	70
8	(Romania) Zoe Florescu														3	3†	DNQ													44
Pos	Driver	MIS1 (Italy)				VLL (Italy)				MNZ (Italy)				MUG1 (Italy)				IMO (Italy)				MIS2 (Italy)				MUG2 (Italy)				Pts

=== Teams' Championship ===
Each team acquired the points earned by their two highest finishing drivers in each race.

Pos	Team	MIS1 (Italy)				VLL (Italy)				MNZ (Italy)				MUG1 (Italy)				IMO (Italy)				MIS2 (Italy)				MUG2 (Italy)				Pts
Pos	Team	R1	R2	R3	R4	R1	R2	R3	R4	R1	R2	R3	R4	R1	R2	R3	R4	R1	R2	R3	R4	R1	R2	R3	R4	R1	R2	R3	R4	Pts
1	(Germany) US Racing	3	1	4	2	1	1	1	1	1	1	1	1	3	1	7	2	1	1	2	1	1	5	3	3	1	1	4	1	1284
1	(Germany) US Racing	5	4	6	4	2	3	2	2	2	4	4	2	11	5	8	6	4	3	3	3	3	6	12	4	4	3	7	9	1284
2	(Italy) Prema Racing	1	2	1	1	3	2	9	3	6	2	3	4	1	2	3	3	6	7	4	9	2	1	1	1	2	4	2	3	1084
2	(Italy) Prema Racing	2	3	2	6	5	4	Ret	4	20	3	6	8	4	3	6	4	7	8	5	12	11	3	11	2	9	8	9	8	1084
3	(France) R-ace GP	15	13	5	7	19	14	5	8	7	6	15	26	2	22	1	1	2	21	1	2	13	2	6	7	5	2	3	4	543
3	(France) R-ace GP	17	16	25	13	20	16		26	16	22	Ret	29	20	23	4	8	5	24	6	8	20	18	15	10	15	Ret	5	5	543
4	(Netherlands) Van Amersfoort Racing	7	9	9	11	9	5	Ret	7	12	Ret	2	11	10	7	11	12	3	2	9	4	5	7	2	5	11	6		7	443
4	(Netherlands) Van Amersfoort Racing		12	11	30	16	Ret		20	30†		8	15	24	11	18	23	11	4	15	5	25	30†	26	17	12	14		30†	443
5	(Switzerland) Jenzer Motorsport	6	10	13	12	6	19	4	16	4	13	7	6	9	Ret	2	7	19	11	10	13	8	11	4	11	3	11	1	2	441
5	(Switzerland) Jenzer Motorsport	18	14	16	16	12	22	10	18	8	Ret	11	18	17	Ret	9	14	22		13	15	9	21	9	20	8	Ret	6	10	441
6	(Italy) Trident Motorsport	8	15	12	17	7	8	15	14	9	9	10	16	6	9	5	11	15	6	8	10	18	4	5	6	6	5	12	6	354
6	(Italy) Trident Motorsport	13	18	23	24	13	11	16	17	13	11	26	19	12	10	14	19	27	19	14	11	21	25	7	14	17	16	22	12	354
7	(Germany) PHM Racing	11	11	10	20	14	6	8	12	11	14	5	17	5	8	16	10	20	14	23	19	7	12	20	12	14	17	11	13	179
7	(Germany) PHM Racing	21		15	22		15	14	22	21	16	14	24	16	14	20	26	26	18	24	30	15	16	21	25	18	27	16	18	179
8	(Switzerland) Maffi Racing	19	7	3	3	23	12	3	6	17	18	23	13	21	25	13	Ret	13	20		24	4	14		19	23	9	28	27	146
8	(Switzerland) Maffi Racing			26	26			17	27	29†			25	23		28	DNQ	23	27		DNQ	16	23		27		31	29	DNQ	146
9	(Italy) Cram Motorsport	23†	17	27	Ret	17		18	24	5	25	24	10	29	12	19	16	12	9	26	22	23	8	25	Ret	24	18	18	Ret	70
9	(Italy) Cram Motorsport		23		DNQ					10	26	Ret	21		26		DNQ	16	17		23	24	29	28†	DNQ			21	DNQ	70
10	(Romania) Real Racing	10		19	19		9	12	15		8	9	14		19	12	21	21		19	18	17	15		26		20	19	29	57
10	(Romania) Real Racing														24	29†	DNQ													57
11	(Italy) Alpha 54 Racing	Ret	25	22	DNQ	25	13		Ret		28	25	DNQ		16	17	24		29	27	DNQ	Ret	24	23	DNQ	25	26	24	DNQ	4
11	(Italy) Alpha 54 Racing			24	DNQ						30	27	DNQ		21	25	DNQ		DNS	DNS	DNQ		31†		DNQ		29		DNQ	4
12	(San Marino) AKM Motorsport	16	21	28	27	15	17	20	Ret	15	23	16	23	27	30	26	DNQ	24	16	18	17	14	19		23	22	24	Ret	DNQ	4
12	(San Marino) AKM Motorsport		24	Ret	DNQ		23	21	DNQ	22	24	17	27	28			DNQ	Ret		21	DNQ	Ret	32†		DNQ	28			DNQ	4
13	(Italy) PA Racing	20	29		DNQ	24		19	28						27	Ret	DNQ	17	28		28									0
14	(Hungary) Zengő Motorsport									18		22	DNQ																	0
15	(Germany) Mathilda Racing																									19	23		26	0
16	(Italy) Technorace																										21	20	DNQ	0
16	(Italy) Technorace																										30	25	DNQ	0
—	(Argentina) Scuderia Buell													WD	WD	WD	WD													0
Pos	Driver	MIS1 (Italy)				VLL (Italy)				MNZ (Italy)				MUG1 (Italy)				IMO (Italy)				MIS2 (Italy)				MUG2 (Italy)				Pts

== See also ==
- 2026 E4 Championship
