= 2026 E4 Championship =

Junior open-wheel racing championship

The 2026 E4 Championship was the fourth season of the E4 Championship (previously titled Euro 4 Championship). It was a multi-event motor racing championship for open wheel, formula racing cars regulated according to FIA Formula 4 regulations, run by ACI Sport and WSK Promotion. The championship uses Tatuus F4-T421 chassis.

== Teams and drivers ==
Team	No.	Driver	Class	Rounds
(Italy) Prema Racing	1	(Spain) Christian Costoya	R	All
(Italy) Prema Racing	4	(United Kingdom) Roman Kamyab	R	All
(Italy) Prema Racing	5	(Italy) Filippo Sala	R	3
(Italy) Prema Racing	10	(Turkey) Alp Aksoy	R	All
(Italy) Prema Racing	12	(Brazil) Vicky Farfus	R W	3
(Italy) Prema Racing	19	(Italy) Niccolò Maccagnani		1–2
(Italy) Prema Racing	27	(Ukraine) Oleksandr Bondarev		1–2
(Italy) Prema Racing	69	(Italy) Kingsley Zheng (Note: Zheng is a Chinese driver competing under an Italian licence.)	R	All
(Italy) Prema Racing	73	(Bulgaria) Lyuboslav Ruykov	R	3
(Italy) Prema Racing	98	(Switzerland) Georgiy Zasov	R	All
(Netherlands) Van Amersfoort Racing	3	(Poland) Aleksander Ruta		All
(Netherlands) Van Amersfoort Racing	53	(Brazil) Pedro Lima		All
(Netherlands) Van Amersfoort Racing	87	(United Kingdom) Thomas Bearman		All
(Germany) PHM Racing	6	(Monaco) Oscar Repetto (Note: Repetto is a New Zealand and Monégasque driver competing under a Monégasque licence.)	R	All
(Germany) PHM Racing	28	(Italy) Iacopo Martinese	R	1–2
(Germany) PHM Racing	40	(United States) Andre Rodriguez		1–2
(Germany) PHM Racing	47	(Estonia) Roland Kuklane	R	All
(Germany) PHM Racing	81	(Italy) Alexander Chartier (Note: Chartier is a Canadian driver competing under an Italian licence.)	R	1
(Germany) US Racing	7	(Finland) Luka Sammalisto		All
(Germany) US Racing	9	(Spain) Edu Robinson		1–2
(Germany) US Racing	13	(Australia) Noah Killion		All
(Germany) US Racing	17	(Italy) Oleksandr Savinkov (Note: Savinkov is a Russo-Ukrainian driver competing under an Italian licence.)		All
(Germany) US Racing	28	(Italy) Iacopo Martinese	R	3
(Germany) US Racing	29	(Italy) Ludovico Busso		All
(Germany) US Racing	46	(India) Ary Bansal		All
(Germany) US Racing	62	(Germany) Arjen Kräling		All
(Italy) Trident Motorsport	16	(Italy) Bernardo Bernoldi (Note: Bernoldi is a Brazilian driver competing under an Italian licence.)	R	All
(Italy) Trident Motorsport	48	(China) Yibei Sun	R	3
(Italy) Trident Motorsport	50	(Switzerland) Florentin Hattemer	R	All
(Italy) Trident Motorsport	51	(Brazil) Augustus Toniolo	R	All
(Italy) Trident Motorsport	67	(Czech Republic) Dominik Šimek	R	All
(Italy) Trident Motorsport	73	(Bulgaria) Lyuboslav Ruykov	R	1–2
(Italy) Trident Motorsport	77	(United Arab Emirates) Lucas Pasquinetti		3
(Switzerland) Jenzer Motorsport	20	(Czech Republic) Teo Borenstein		2–3
(Switzerland) Jenzer Motorsport	21	(Czech Republic) Ella Häkkinen	R W	2
(Switzerland) Jenzer Motorsport	26	(Qatar) Bader Al Sulaiti		2
(France) R-ace GP	30	(France) Andy Consani		All
(France) R-ace GP	32	(Greece) Jean-Paul Karras		All
(France) R-ace GP	33	(Hungary) Tamás Gender	R	1–2
(France) R-ace GP	34	(United Kingdom) Kenzo Craigie	R	All
(France) R-ace GP	35	(United States) Payton Westcott	W	3
(France) R-ace GP	36	(Greece) Philippe Armand Karras		All
(Italy) Cram Motorsport	38	(Germany) Simon Rechenmacher	R	3
(Italy) Cram Motorsport	70	(United States) Dean Pedersen		3
(Romania) Real Racing	41	(Denmark) Knud Nielsen	R	All
(Argentina) Scuderia Buell	52	(Argentina) Joaquin Rubino		1
(Italy) PA Racing	64	(Italy) Ginevra Panzeri	W	2–3
(San Marino) AKM Motorsport	66	(Australia) George Proudford-Nalder	R	1
(San Marino) AKM Motorsport	88	(Italy) Vittorio Orsini	R	All
(San Marino) AKM Motorsport	96	(Saudi Arabia) Abdullah Kamel		2

Icon	Legend
R	Rookie
W	Woman Trophy

- Bernardo Bernoldi was scheduled to compete for Prema Racing, but later moved to Trident.

== Race calendar and results ==
The calendar was initially revealed in early October 2025.

Round		Circuit	Date	Pole position	Fastest lap	Winning driver	Winning team	Secondary Class Winner	Supporting
1	R1	(Italy) Vallelunga Circuit	4 July	(Italy) Niccolò Maccagnani	(Finland) Luka Sammalisto	(Finland) Luka Sammalisto	(Germany) US Racing	R: (United Kingdom) Kenzo Craigie	Porsche Carrera Cup Italia; GT4 Italian Series
1	R2	(Italy) Vallelunga Circuit	5 July	(United Kingdom) Roman Kamyab	(United Kingdom) Kenzo Craigie	(United Kingdom) Kenzo Craigie	(France) R-ace GP	R: (United Kingdom) Kenzo Craigie	Porsche Carrera Cup Italia; GT4 Italian Series
1	R3	(Italy) Vallelunga Circuit	5 July	(Finland) Luka Sammalisto	(Finland) Luka Sammalisto	(Finland) Luka Sammalisto	(Germany) US Racing	R: (Spain) Christian Costoya	Porsche Carrera Cup Italia; GT4 Italian Series
2	R1	(France) Circuit Paul Ricard	18 July	(United Kingdom) Kenzo Craigie	(United Kingdom) Kenzo Craigie	(Turkey) Alp Aksoy	(Italy) Prema Racing	R: (Turkey) Alp Aksoy; W: (Italy) Ginevra Panzeri	International GT Open; Euroformula Open Championship; Formula Regional European Championship; GT Cup Open Europe
2	R2	(France) Circuit Paul Ricard	19 July	(United Kingdom) Kenzo Craigie	(United Kingdom) Kenzo Craigie	(United Kingdom) Kenzo Craigie	(France) R-ace GP	R: (United Kingdom) Kenzo Craigie; W: (Czech Republic) Ella Häkkinen	International GT Open; Euroformula Open Championship; Formula Regional European Championship; GT Cup Open Europe
2	R3	(France) Circuit Paul Ricard	19 July	(United Kingdom) Kenzo Craigie	(United Kingdom) Kenzo Craigie	(United Kingdom) Kenzo Craigie	(France) R-ace GP	R: (United Kingdom) Kenzo Craigie; W: (Italy) Ginevra Panzeri	International GT Open; Euroformula Open Championship; Formula Regional European Championship; GT Cup Open Europe
3	R1	(Italy) Monza Circuit	9–11 October	(India) Ary Bansal	(United Kingdom) Kenzo Craigie	(United Kingdom) Kenzo Craigie	(France) R-ace GP	R: (United Kingdom) Kenzo Craigie; W: (Italy) Ginevra Panzeri	Italian GT Championship Sprint Cup; GT4 Italian Series
3	R2	(Italy) Monza Circuit	9–11 October	(Brazil) Augustus Toniolo	(India) Ary Bansal	(India) Ary Bansal	(Germany) US Racing	R: (Italy) Iacopo Martinese; W: (Brazil) Vicky Farfus	Italian GT Championship Sprint Cup; GT4 Italian Series
3	R3	(Italy) Monza Circuit	9–11 October	(France) Andy Consani	(Italy) Iacopo Martinese	(Finland) Luka Sammalisto	(Germany) US Racing	R: (Brazil) Augustus Toniolo; W: (United States) Payton Westcott	Italian GT Championship Sprint Cup; GT4 Italian Series

== Championship standings ==
Points are awarded to the top 15 classified finishers in each race. No points are awarded for pole position or fastest lap. The final classifications for the secondary class standings is obtained by summing up the scores on the 7 best results obtained during the races held.

Position	**1st**	**2nd**	**3rd**	**4th**	**5th**	**6th**	**7th**	**8th**	**9th**	**10th**	**11th**	**12th**	**13th**	**14th**	**15th**
Points	30	26	22	20	18	16	14	12	10	9	8	6	4	2	1

=== Drivers' championship ===
Pos	Driver	VLL (Italy)			LEC (France)			MNZ (Italy)			Pts
Pos	Driver	R1	R2	R3	R1	R2	R3	R1	R2	R3	Pts
1	(United Kingdom) Kenzo Craigie	6	1	9	**3**	**1**	**1**	1	28†	3	190
2	(Finland) Luka Sammalisto	1	3	**1**	4	3	28	9	2	1	190
3	(France) Andy Consani	9	26	21	2	4	2	10	4	**4**	131
4	(Turkey) Alp Aksoy	8	5	8	1	2	7	WD	WD	WD	112
5	(Italy) Oleksandr Savinkov	3	13	6	5	Ret	5	5	Ret	7	110
6	(India) Ary Bansal	21	10	5	11	6	3	**27†**	1	20	103
7	(Poland) Aleksander Ruta	20	12	31†	9	17	10	3	6	5	81
8	(Ukraine) Oleksandr Bondarev	5	7	4	27	12	4				78
9	(Australia) Noah Killion	7	Ret	2	6	Ret	9	21	25	10	75
10	(Spain) Christian Costoya	15	6	3	12	7	6	24	19	30	75
11	(Italy) Iacopo Martinese	23	Ret	19	17	16	31	2	3	6	64
12	(Spain) Edu Robinson	11	8	7	31	5	8				64
13	(Italy) Niccolò Maccagnani	**2**	9	WD	10	9	14				57
14	(United Kingdom) Roman Kamyab	10	**2**	27	Ret	20	21	13	12	14	47
15	(Germany) Arjen Kräling	4	4	32†	15	18	12	Ret	Ret	29	47
16	(Italy) Ludovico Busso	16	11	10	13	8	30	28†	14	8	47
17	(United Kingdom) Thomas Bearman	27	21	11	16	11	13	Ret	7	12	40
18	(Italy) Filippo Sala							7	5	18	32
19	(Greece) Jean-Paul Karras	32	30	22	7	36	11	16	9	32	32
20	(Brazil) Augustus Toniolo	19	24	15	20	22	18	Ret	**27†**	2	27
21	(Italy) Kingsley Zheng	14	32	18	Ret	25	16	4	17	23	22
22	(Greece) Philippe Armand Karras	35†	25	13	8	13	Ret	25	23	Ret	20
23	(Denmark) Knud Nielsen	13	14	26	Ret	23	Ret	8	20	27	18
24	(Estonia) Roland Kuklane	33	22	16	32	30	20	6	22	19	16
25	(Czech Republic) Dominik Šimek	Ret	18	12	23	21	19	22	Ret	9	16
26	(Germany) Simon Rechenmacher							Ret	8	16	12
27	(Switzerland) Florentin Hattemer	25	16	24	18	10	15	Ret	Ret	15	11
28	(Switzerland) Georgiy Zasov	22	23	14	24	26	22	26	29†	11	10
29	(United States) Dean Pedersen							Ret	10	Ret	9
30	(Bulgaria) Lyuboslav Ruykov	26	29	23	25	24	26	Ret	11	26	8
31	(Italy) Vittorio Orsini	31	33	29	Ret	31	25	11	Ret	31	8
32	(Australia) George Proudford-Nalder	12	19	Ret							6
33	(Italy) Ginevra Panzeri				33	32	29	12	21	24	6
34	(Czech Republic) Teo Borenstein				21	15	17	15	Ret	13	6
35	(Brazil) Vicky Farfus							17	13	Ret	4
36	(Monaco) Oscar Repetto	24	17	17	22	14	Ret	14	16	25	4
37	(Qatar) Bader Al Sulaiti				14	19	Ret				2
38	(Italy) Bernardo Bernoldi	17	15	Ret	19	33	33†	29†	15	17	2
39	(United Arab Emirates) Lucas Pasquinetti							18	18	28	0
40	(Italy) Alexander Chartier	18	20	25							0
41	(China) Yibei Sun							19	24	21	0
42	(United States) Payton Westcott							20	Ret	22	0
43	(Brazil) Pedro Lima	29	27	20	28	35	27	23	26	Ret	0
44	(Saudi Arabia) Abdullah Kamel				30	28	23				0
45	(Hungary) Tamás Gender	30	31	Ret	26	34	24				0
46	(Czech Republic) Ella Häkkinen				Ret	27	32†				0
47	(United States) Andre Rodriguez	28	28	28	29	29	Ret				0
48	(Argentina) Joaquin Rubino	34	34†	30							0
Pos	Driver	R1	R2	R3	R1	R2	R3	R1	R2	R3	Pts
Pos	Driver	VLL (Italy)			LEC (France)			MNZ (Italy)			Pts

Colour	Result
Gold	Winner
Silver	Second place
Bronze	Third place
Green	Points classification
Blue	Non-points classification
Blue	Non-classified finish (NC)
Purple	Retired, not classified (Ret)
Red	Did not qualify (DNQ)
Red	Did not pre-qualify (DNPQ)
Black	Disqualified (DSQ)
White	Did not start (DNS)
White	Withdrew (WD)
White	Race cancelled (C)
Blank	Did not practice (DNP)
Blank	Did not arrive (DNA)
Blank	Excluded (EX)

**Bold** – Pole
Italics – Fastest Lap
† — Did not finish, but classified

=== Secondary classes standings ===
Pos	Driver	VLL (Italy)			LEC (France)			MNZ (Italy)			Pts
Pos	Driver	R1	R2	R3	R1	R2	R3	R1	R2	R3	Pts
Rookies' championship
1	(United Kingdom) Kenzo Craigie	1	1	3							82
2	(Turkey) Alp Aksoy	2	3	2							74
3	(Spain) Christian Costoya	7	4	1							64
4	(United Kingdom) Roman Kamyab	3	2	15							49
5	(Denmark) Knud Nielsen	5	5	14							38
6	(Czech Republic) Dominik Šimek	Ret	9	4							30
7	(Switzerland) Georgiy Zasov	11	13	5							30
8	(Australia) George Proudford-Nalder	4	10	Ret							29
9	(Italy) Bernardo Bernoldi	8	6	Ret							28
10	(Monaco) Oscar Repetto	13	8	8							28
11	(Brazil) Augustus Toniolo	10	14	6							27
12	(Italy) Kingsley Zheng	6	17	9							26
13	(Switzerland) Florentin Hattemer	14	7	12							22
14	(Italy) Alexander Chartier	9	11	13							22
15	(Estonia) Roland Kuklane	18	12	7							20
16	(Italy) Iacopo Martinese	12	Ret	10							15
17	(Bulgaria) Lyuboslav Ruykov	15	15	11							10
18	(Hungary) Tamás Gender	16	16	Ret							0
19	(Italy) Vittorio Orsini	17	18	16							0
–	(Czech Republic) Ella Häkkinen										–
Women's championship
–	(Czech Republic) Ella Häkkinen										–
–	(Italy) Ginevra Panzeri										–
Pos	Driver	R1	R2	R3	R1	R2	R3	R1	R2	R3	Pts
Pos	Driver	VLL (Italy)			LEC (France)			MNZ (Italy)			Pts

=== Teams' championship ===
Each team acquired the points earned by their two best drivers in each race.

Pos	Team	MIS1 (Italy)			VLL (Italy)			MNZ (Italy)			Pts
Pos	Team	R1	R2	R3	R1	R2	R3	R1	R2	R3	Pts
1	(Germany) US Racing	1	3	1							150
1	(Germany) US Racing	3	4	2							150
2	(Italy) Prema Racing	2	2	3							130
2	(Italy) Prema Racing	5	5	4							130
3	(France) R-ace GP	6	1	9							70
3	(France) R-ace GP	9	25	13							70
4	(Netherlands) Van Amersfoort Racing	20	12	11							14
4	(Netherlands) Van Amersfoort Racing	27	21	20							14
5	(Italy) Trident Motorsport	17	15	12							8
5	(Italy) Trident Motorsport	19	16	15							8
6	(San Marino) AKM Motorsport	12	19	29							6
6	(San Marino) AKM Motorsport	31	33	Ret							6
7	(Romania) Real Racing	13	14	26							6
8	(Germany) PHM Racing	18	17	16							0
8	(Germany) PHM Racing	23	20	17							0
9	(Argentina) Scuderia Buell	34	34†	30							0
–	(Switzerland) Jenzer Motorsport										–
–	(Italy) PA Racing										–
Pos	Team	R1	R2	R3	R1	R2	R3	R1	R2	R3	Pts
Pos	Team	MIS1 (Italy)			VLL (Italy)			MNZ (Italy)			Pts

Colour	Result
Gold	Winner
Silver	Second place
Bronze	Third place
Green	Points classification
Blue	Non-points classification
Blue	Non-classified finish (NC)
Purple	Retired, not classified (Ret)
Red	Did not qualify (DNQ)
Red	Did not pre-qualify (DNPQ)
Black	Disqualified (DSQ)
White	Did not start (DNS)
White	Withdrew (WD)
White	Race cancelled (C)
Blank	Did not practice (DNP)
Blank	Did not arrive (DNA)
Blank	Excluded (EX)

**Bold** – Pole
Italics – Fastest Lap
† — Did not finish, but classified

== See also ==
- 2026 Italian F4 Championship
