= Edu Robinson =

Spanish and British racing driver (born 2009)

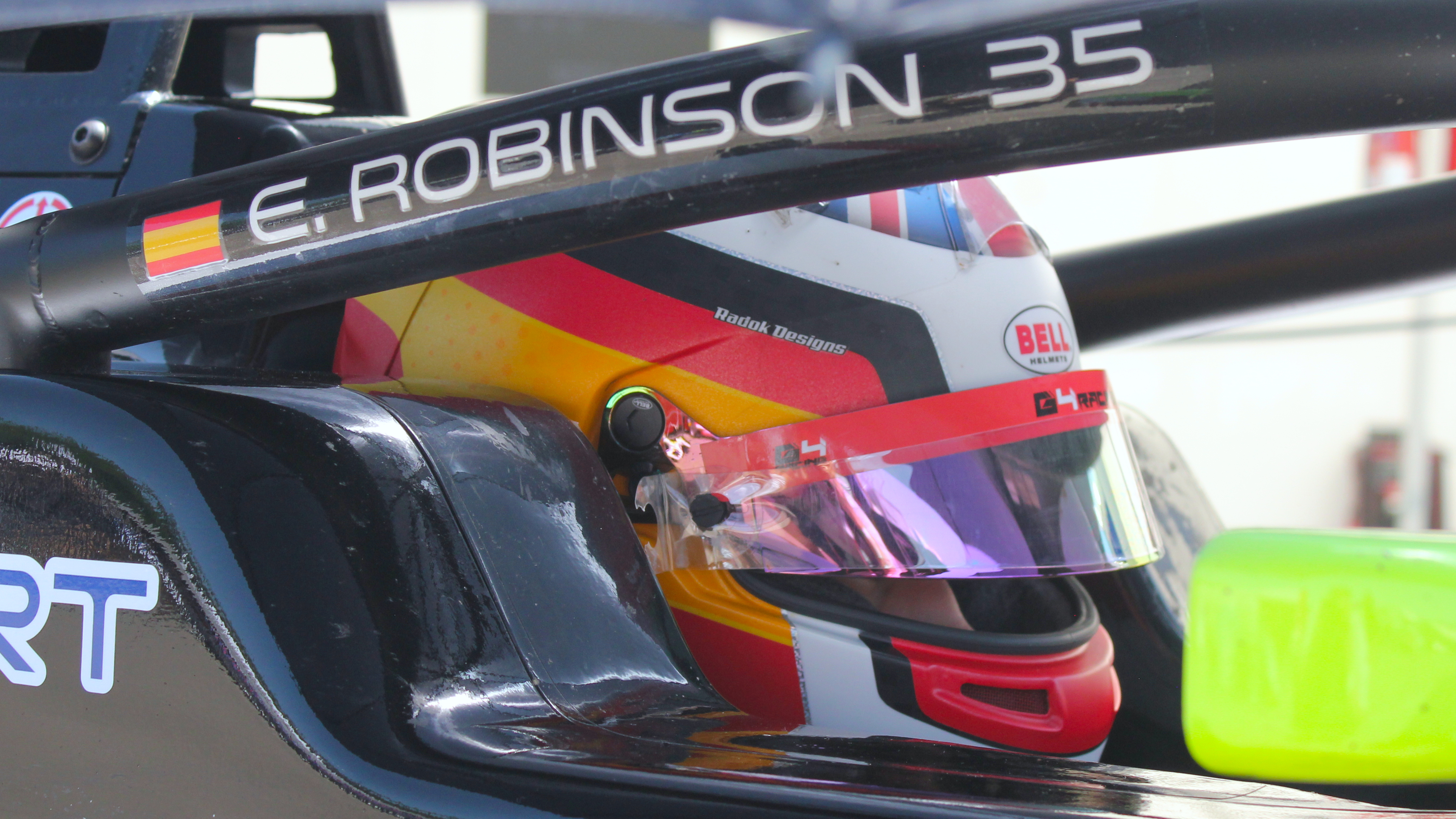
- Robinson in 2025
- Nationality: (Spain) Spanish (United Kingdom) British via dual nationality
- Born: Edward Antony Robinson Lliteras; 25 March 2009 (age 17) Manacor, Mallorca, Spain

Italian F4 Championship career
- Debut season: 2024
- Current team: US Racing
- Car number: 9
- Former teams: AS Motorsport
- Starts: 42
- Wins: 2
- Podiums: 8
- Poles: 5
- Fastest laps: 2
- Best finish: 6th in 2026

Previous series
- 2026; 2025; 2025; 2025; 2025; 2024, 2026; 2023: GB3; FR European; Eurocup-3; F4 Spanish; Formula Winter Series; Euro 4 / E4; Ginetta Junior
- Statistics up to date as of 2 November 2026.

Edward Antony Robinson Lliteras (Note: Sometimes spelled Eduard Robinson.) (born 25 March 2009) is a Spanish and British racing driver who last competed in the Italian F4 Championship and E4 Championship for US Racing.

Robinson previously competed with G4 Racing in the Formula Regional European Championship.

== Personal life ==
Robinson was born on 25 March 2009 in the Mallorcan town of Manacor, to a British father and a Spanish mother. In 2018, his mother Joana and younger brother Arthur were killed in the severe flash floods in nearby Sant Llorenç des Cardassar.

== Career ==
=== Karting ===
Starting karting at the age of five, Robinson won the Balearic Go-Karting Championship in both 2015 and 2016, before moving to the Spanish Karting Championship, which he would win in 2020 in the Mini category.

=== Ginetta Junior Championship ===
In 2023, Robinson stepped up to car-racing, competing in for R Racing the Ginetta Junior Championship. Robinson achieved his best result of the season at the final race at Donington Park, going from 12th to third to score his only podium in the series.

=== Formula 4 ===
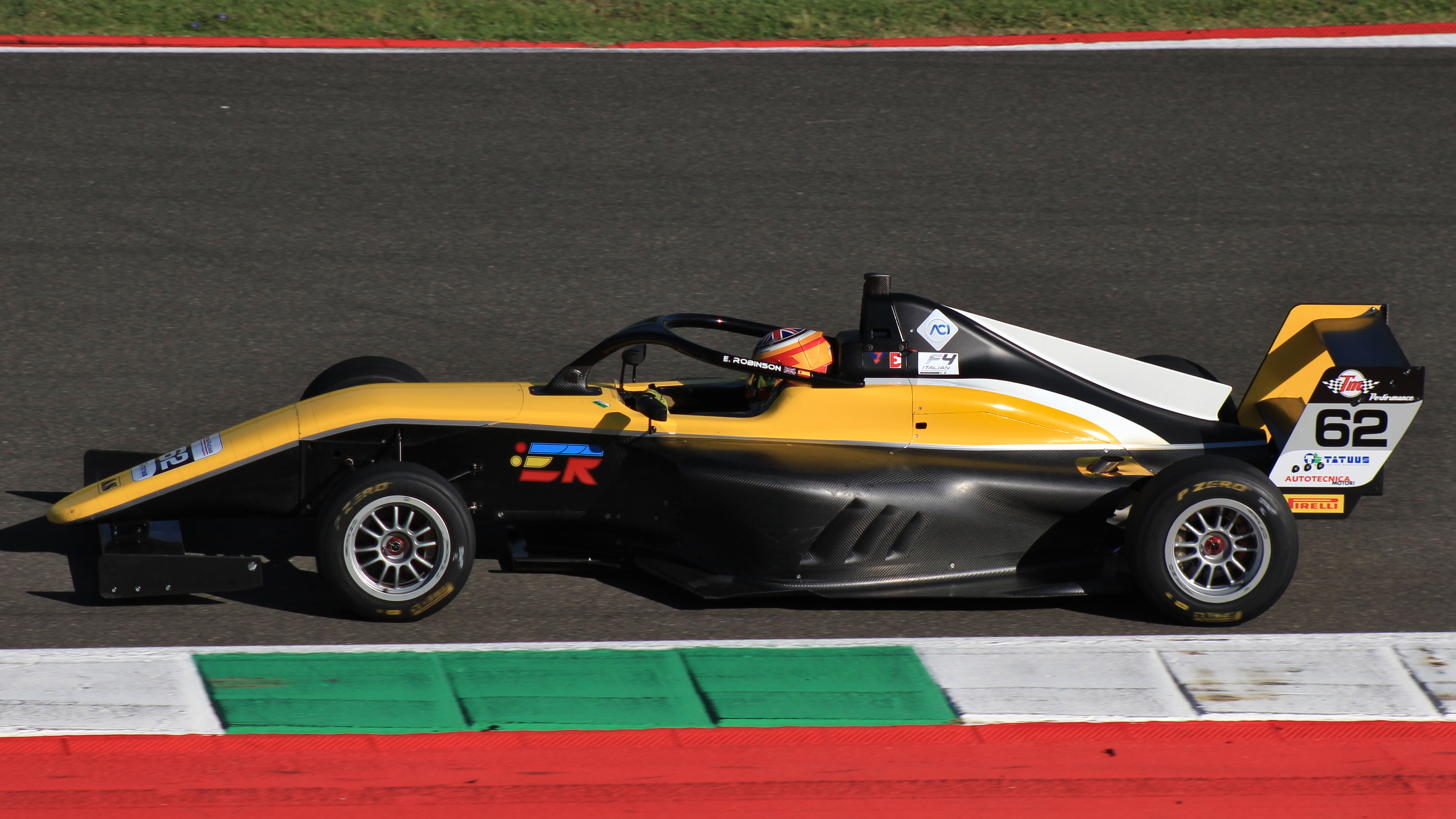
Robinson driving at the Mugello Circuit during the 2024 Italian F4 Championship

==== 2024 ====
In 2024, Robinson made his single-seater debut, racing for AS Motorsport in the Italian F4 Championship. Racing for the Slovene team for the first five rounds of the season, Robinson scored a best result of 14th at Paul Ricard, before switching to US Racing for the rest of the Italian and Euro 4 seasons.

With the German team, Robinson scored his first points and rookie podium in F4 at the third Red Bull Ring race in Euro 4 by finishing seventh. Robinson also scored his first rookie podium in Italian F4 after finishing fifth in the second race of the season-ending Monza round.

==== 2025 ====
After topping Italian F4 post-season testing at Imola and Misano, US Racing announced that Robinson would drive for them in the Formula Winter Series and E4 Championships.

In the first round of the season at Algarve, Robinson scored his maiden podium in Formula 4 by finishing third in race one, following it up with a second-place in race two behind teammate Gabriel Gomez. In race three Robinson qualified on pole but a bad start sent him down the order and could only muster an 11th place finish on track, only to be promoted to tenth following Maxim Rehm's disqualification, leaving Algarve third in points behind Gomez and Leo Robinson.

At Valencia, Robinson had a difficult weekend, with a DNF in race 1 due to an engine failure, in race 2, he managed to score points with a ninth place, and in race 3, Robinson started in the pitlane due to an engine failure again and having to pit during the race because of a mechanical flag, but he still managed to finish 20th. He did not compete in the final two rounds, finishing the season in 12th place with 38 points. After departing US Racing, Robinson joined DXR to race in the season-opening Aragón round of the F4 Spanish Championship, in which he scored a best result of 14th in race one.

==== 2026 ====
In 2026, Robinson returned to US Racing for a dual campaign in the Italian F4 and E4 Championships. In Italian F4, Robinson began the season with a win Vallelunga and an additional pair of podiums from pole, before taking pole again a round later at Monza. Robinson followed that up with a win at Imola and four other podiums to end the year sixth overall. In E4, Robinson competed in the first two rounds, taking a best result of fifth in race two at Le Castellet to take 12th in points.

=== Formula Regional ===
==== 2025 ====
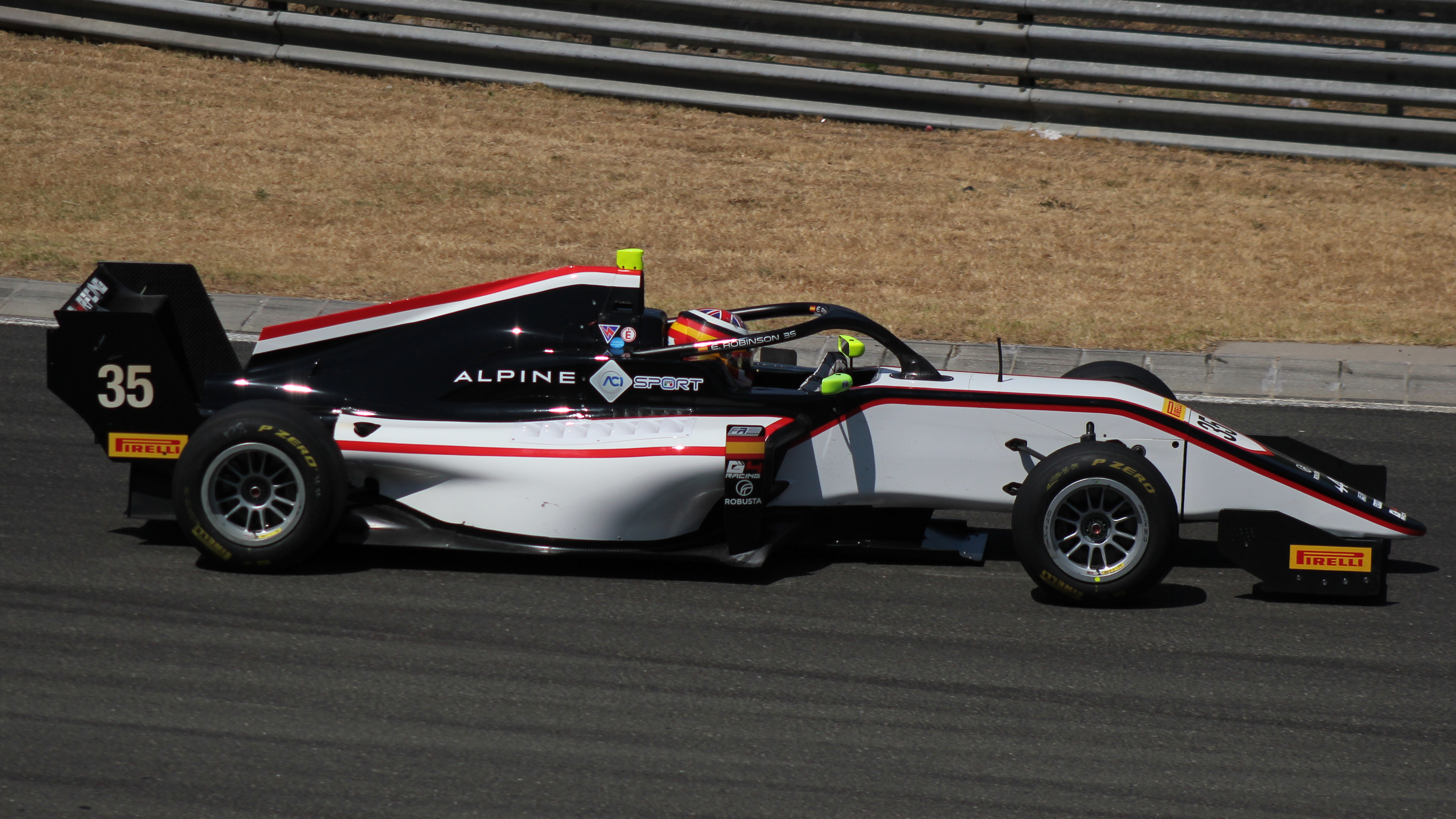
Robinson driving at the Hungaroring during the 2025 Formula Regional European Championship

In June, Robinson made his Eurocup-3 debut for Drivex at Algarve, scoring a best result of 12th in race one. Later that month, Robinson joined G4 Racing to compete in the Formula Regional European Championship from Hungaroring onwards. Racing in the last seven rounds of the season, Robinson scored a best result of 12th at Imola, but scored points at Monza by finishing 13th in race two as he ended the race behind three guest drivers.

==== 2026 ====
For the fifth round of the 2026 GB3 Championship in Silverstone, Robinson joined Elite Motorsport for select appearances, in which he took a lone podium at Silverstone.

== Karting record ==
=== Karting career summary ===
Season	Series	Team	Position
2017	Spanish Karting Championship – Alevin		9th
2018	WSK Final Cup – 60 Mini	Kids to Win	116th
2019	WSK Euro Series – 60 Mini	Team Driver Racing Kart	114th
2019	WSK Open Cup – 60 Mini	Team Driver Racing Kart	63rd
2019	WSK Final Cup – 60 Mini	Team Driver Racing Kart	72nd
2019	IAME Winter Cup – X30 Mini	Fusion Motorsport	7th
2019	IAME Euro Series – X30 Mini	Fusion Motorsport	6th
2019	Spanish Karting Championship – Cadet		9th
2019	IAME International Final – X30 Mini		15th
2020	Spanish Karting Championship – Mini		1st
2020	IAME Winter Cup – X30 Mini	Privateer	23rd
2020	IAME Euro Series – X30 Mini	Fusion Motorsport; David Robinson (Note: Robinson competed for Fusion Motorsport in Round 1 and Forza Racing in round 2.)	18th
2020	IAME International Games – X30 Mini	Fusion Motorsport	NC
2020	LeCont Trophy – X30 Mini	Fusion Motorsport	4th
2021	26° South Garda Winter Cup – OKJ	Forza Racing	20th
2021	WSK Champions Cup – OKJ	DPK Racing	95th
2021	WSK Euro Series – OKJ	DPK Racing	45th
2021	WSK Super Master Series – OKJ	DPK Racing	128th
2021	Champions of the Future – OKJ	DPK Racing; Forza Racing (Note: Robinson competed for DPK Racing Team in Round 1 and Forza Racing in rounds 2–3.)	73rd
2021	Karting European Championship – OKJ	DPK Racing; Forza Racing (Note: Robinson competed for DPK Racing Team in Rounds 1–2 and Forza Racing in round 3.)	73rd
2021	WSK Open Cup – OKJ	Forza Racing	61st
2021	Karting World Championship – OKJ	Forza Racing	83rd
2021	WSK Final Cup – OKJ	Forza Racing	20th
2022	WSK Super Master Series – OKJ	Forza Racing	56th
2022	South Garda Winter Cup – OKJ	Forza Racing	33rd
2022	WSK Euro Series – OKJ	Forza Racing	43rd
2022	Champions of the Future – OKJ	Forza Racing	34th
2022	Karting European Championship – OKJ	Forza Racing	38th
2022	WSK Open Cup – OKJ	Forza Racing	14th
2022	WSK Final Cup – OKJ	Forza Racing	50th
2022	Karting World Championship – OKJ	Forza Racing	57th
2022	Italian Karting Championship – OKJ		47th
2024	WSK Open Series – KZ2	Renda Motorsport	65th

== Racing record ==
=== Racing career summary ===
Season	Series	Team	Races	Wins	Poles	F/Laps	Podiums	Points	Position
2023	Ginetta Junior Championship	R Racing	27	0	0	0	1	260	11th
2024	Italian F4 Championship	AS Motorsport	15	0	0	0	0	10	19th
2024	Italian F4 Championship	US Racing	6	0	0	0	0	10	19th
2024	Euro 4 Championship	US Racing	6	0	0	0	0	6	16th
2025	Formula Winter Series	US Racing	6	0	1	0	2	38	12th
2025	F4 Spanish Championship	DXR	3	0	0	0	0	0	32nd
2025	Eurocup-3	Drivex	3	0	0	0	0	0	25th
2025	Formula Regional European Championship	G4 Racing	14	0	0	0	0	1	21st
2026	Italian F4 Championship	US Racing	21	2	5	3	8	308	6th
2026	E4 Championship	US Racing	6	0	0	0	0	64	12th
2026	GB3 Championship	Elite Motorsport	6	0	0	0	1	44	23rd

* Season still in progress.

=== Complete Ginetta Junior Championship results ===
(key) (Races in bold indicate pole position) (Races in italics indicate fastest lap)

Year	Entrant	1	2	3	4	5	6	7	8	9	10	11	12	13	14	15	16	17	18	19	20	21	22	23	24	25	26	27	Pos	Points
2023	R Racing	OUL; 1; 13	OUL; 2; 13	OUL; 3; 10	SIL1; 1 Ret	SIL1; 2; 12	SIL1; 3; 14	DON1; 1 Ret	DON1; 2; 15	DON1; 3; 8	SIL2; 1; 10	SIL2; 2; 14	SIL2; 3; 13	SIL2; 4; 10	SIL2; 5; 14	SIL2; 6; 11	SNE; 1; 5	SNE; 2; 11	SNE; 3; 10	CAD; 1; 13	CAD; 2; 12	CAD; 3; 12	BRH; 1 Ret	BRH; 2; 7	BRH; 3; 10	DON2; 1; 8	DON2; 2; 12	DON2; 3; 3	11th	260

=== Complete Italian F4 Championship results ===
(key) (Races in bold indicate pole position) (Races in italics indicate fastest lap)

Year	Entrant	1	2	3	4	5	6	7	8	9	10	11	12	13	14	15	16	17	18	19	20	21	22	23	24	25	26	27	28	Pos	Points
2024	AS Motorsport	MIS; 1; 35†	MIS; 2; 21	MIS; 3; 20	IMO; 1; 19	IMO; 2; 19	IMO; 3; 17	VLL; 1; 15	VLL; 2; 28	VLL; 3; 26	MUG; 1; 27	MUG; 2; 17	MUG; 3; 29	LEC; 1; 24	LEC; 2; 22	LEC; 3; 14														19th	10
2024	US Racing																CAT; 1 Ret	CAT; 2; 14	CAT; 3; 13	MNZ; 1 Ret	MNZ; 2; 5	MNZ; 3; 22								19th	10
2026	US Racing	MIS1; 1; 12	MIS1; 2; 4	MIS1; 3	MIS1; 4; 14	VLL; 1	**VLL**; **2**; 1	**VLL**; **3**; 2	VLL; 4; 2	MNZ; 1	**MNZ**; **2**; 5	**MNZ**; **3**; 21	MNZ; 4; 9	MUG1; 1; 14	MUG1; 2	MUG1; 3; 24	MUG1; 4; 28	**IMO**; **1**; 1	IMO; 2; 3	IMO; 3	IMO; 4; 3	MIS2; 1	MIS2; 2; 6	MIS2; 3; 3	MIS2; 4; 3	MUG2; 1	MUG2; 2; 7	MUG2; 3; 4	MUG2; 4; 24	6th	308

=== Complete Euro 4 / E4 Championship results ===
(key) (Races in bold indicate pole position; races in italics indicate fastest lap)

Year	Entrant	1	2	3	4	5	6	7	8	9	Pos	Points
2024	US Racing	MUG; 1	MUG; 2	MUG; 3	RBR; 1; 21	RBR; 2; 21	RBR; 3; 7	MNZ; 1 Ret	MNZ; 2; 29	MNZ; 3; 20	16th	6
2026	US Racing	VLL; 1; 11	VLL; 2; 8	VLL; 3; 7	LEC; 1; 31	LEC; 2; 5	LEC; 3; 8	MNZ; 1	MNZ; 2	MNZ; 3	12th	64

=== Complete Formula Winter Series results ===
(key) (Races in bold indicate pole position) (Races in italics indicate fastest lap)

Year	Team	1	2	3	4	5	6	7	8	9	10	11	12	DC	Points
2025	US Racing	POR; 1; 3	POR; 2; 2	**POR**; **3**; 10	CRT; 1; 25†	CRT; 2; 9	CRT; 3; 20	ARA; 1	ARA; 2	ARA; 3	CAT; 1	CAT; 2	CAT; 3	12th	38

=== Complete F4 Spanish Championship results ===
(key) (Races in bold indicate pole position; races in italics indicate fastest lap)

Year	Entrant	1	2	3	4	5	6	7	8	9	10	11	12	13	14	15	16	17	18	19	20	21	Pos	Points
2025	DXR	ARA; 1; 14	ARA; 2; 25	ARA; 3 Ret	NAV; 1	NAV; 2	NAV; 3	POR; 1	POR; 2	POR; 3	LEC; 1	LEC; 2	LEC; 3	JER; 1	JER; 2	JER; 3	CRT; 1	CRT; 2	CRT; 3	CAT; 1	CAT; 2	CAT; 3	32nd	0

=== Complete Eurocup-3 results ===
(key) (Races in bold indicate pole position; races in italics indicate fastest lap)

Year	Entrant	1	2	3	4	5	6	7	8	9	10	11	12	13	14	15	16	17	18	Pos	Points
2025	Drivex	RBR; 1	RBR; 2	POR; 1; 12	POR; SR; 15	POR; 2; 21	LEC; 1	LEC; SR	LEC; 2	MNZ; 1	MNZ; 2	ASS; 1	ASS; 2	SPA; 1	SPA; 2	JER; 1	JER; 2	CAT; 1	CAT; 2	25th	0

=== Complete Formula Regional European Championship results ===
(key) (Races in bold indicate pole position) (Races in italics indicate fastest lap)

Year	Entrant	1	2	3	4	5	6	7	8	9	10	11	12	13	14	15	16	17	18	19	20	Pos	Points
2025	G4 Racing	MIS; 1	MIS; 2	SPA; 1	SPA; 2	ZAN; 1	ZAN; 2	HUN; 1 Ret	HUN; 2; 24	LEC; 1; 21	LEC; 2; 18	IMO; 1; 12	IMO; 2; 13	RBR; 1; 19	RBR; 2; 18	CAT; 1; 17	CAT; 2; 16	HOC; 1; 19	HOC; 2; 15	MNZ; 1; 16	MNZ; 2; 13	21st	1

=== Complete GB3 Championship results ===
(key) (Races in bold indicate pole position; races in italics indicate fastest lap)

Year	Entrant	1	2	3	4	5	6	7	8	9	10	11	12	13	14	15	16	17	18	19	20	21	22	23	24	Pos	Points
2026	Elite Motorsport	SIL1; 1	SIL1; 2	SIL1; 3	SPA; 1	SPA; 2	SPA; 3	HUN; 1	HUN; 2	HUN; 3	RBR; 1	RBR; 2	RBR; 3	SIL2; 1; 12	SIL2; 2; 12	SIL2; 3; 3	DON; 1	DON; 2	DON; 3	BRH; 1; 15	BRH; 2; 17	BRH; 3; 16^{1}	CAT; 1	CAT; 2	CAT; 3	23rd	44
