= Zhenrui Chi =

Chinese racing driver (born 2009)

- 池振睿
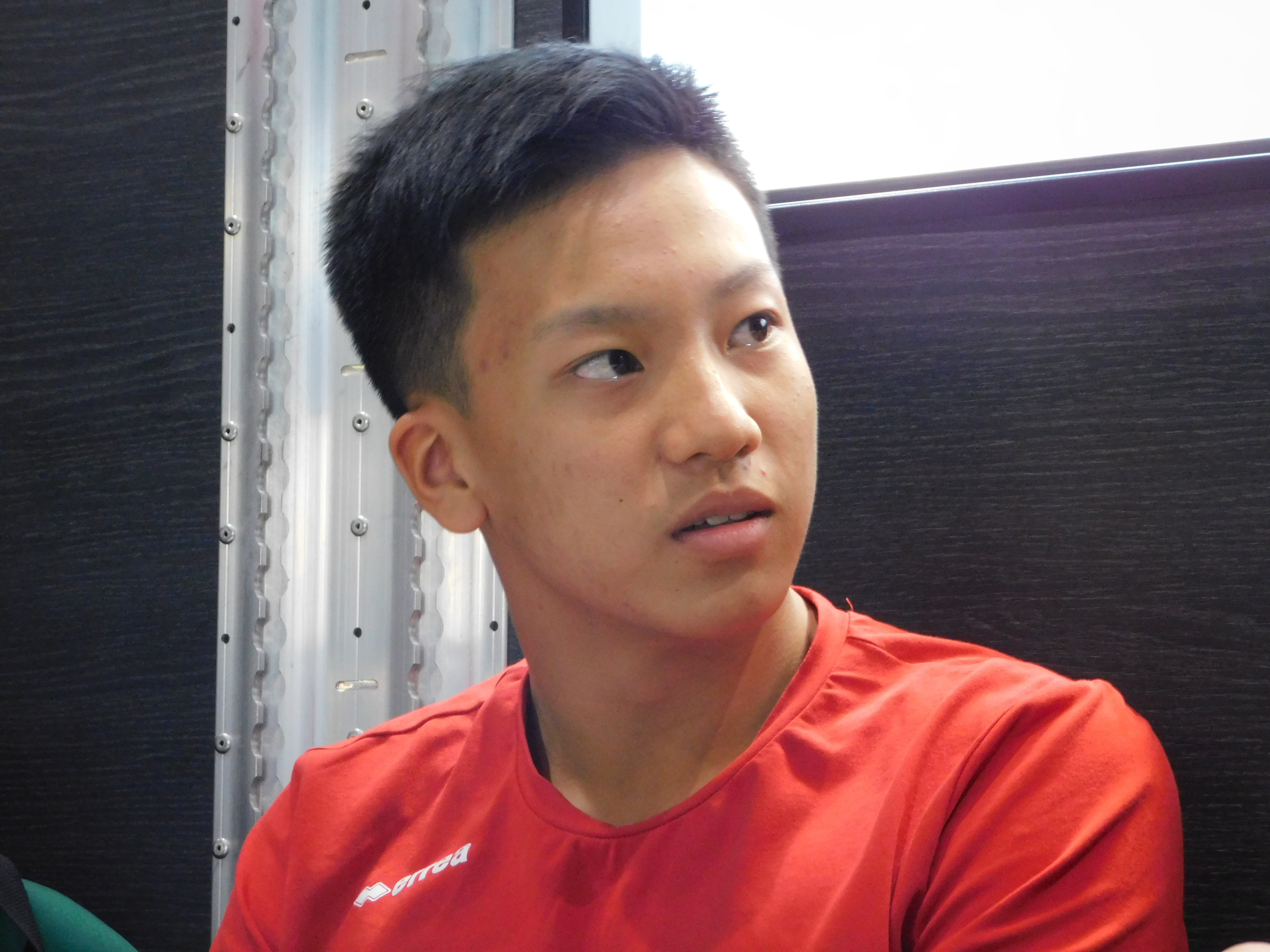
- Chi in 2025
- Born: 28 March 2009 (age 17); Wenzhou, China
- Nationality: (China) Chinese; (Italy) Italian (Note: Chi is Chinese but competes under an Italian licence.)

Formula Regional European Championship career
- Debut season: 2026
- Former teams: CL Motorsport, MP Motorsport
- Starts: 23
- Wins: 0
- Podiums: 0
- Poles: 0
- Fastest laps: 0
- Best finish: 8th in 2026
- Statistics up to date as of 20 October 2026.

Previous series
- 2026; 2025–2026; 2025; 2025; 2025; 2025; 2024: FR Middle East; FR European; GB3; E4; Italian F4; F4 Middle East; Formula Trophy UAE

Zhenrui "Newman" Chi (Chinese: 池振睿; pinyin: Chí Zhèn Ruì; born 28 March 2009) is a Chinese racing driver who is set to compete under the Italian flag in the FIA Formula 3 Championship for MP Motorsport as part of the AMF1 Driver Development Programme.

Chi is a race winner in the Italian F4 Championship for Prema Racing, finishing fifth in 2025, and progressed to Formula Regional Europe in 2026.

== Career ==
=== Karting (2014–2023) ===
Chi began karting at the age of five, initially racing in China before moving to Europe in 2019. Internationally, Chi most notably finished third in the 2021 Trofeo Delle Industrie, and second in the 2022 WSK Champions Cup, both in OK-J.

=== Formula 4 (2024–2025) ===
==== 2024 ====
Chi was initially slated to make his single-seater debut in the 2024 Formula 4 UAE Championship, but instead opted to test F4 machinery for much of the year, before eventually making his single-seater debut with Prema Racing in the inaugural season of Formula Trophy UAE. In the three-round season, Chi finished third on his debut at Dubai, before ending the season with a second-place finish in race one at Yas Marina and a pole position in race two on his way to fifth in points.

==== 2025 ====
Staying with Prema Racing for 2025, Chi drove with them for the inaugural season of the F4 Middle East Championship, along with a dual programme in both the Italian F4 and E4 Championships. In the former, he finished fifth in the season-opening race at Yas Marina, which turned out to be his season-best result, matching it at Dubai and the third Yas Marina round on his way to ninth in the overall standings and runner-up in the rookies'.

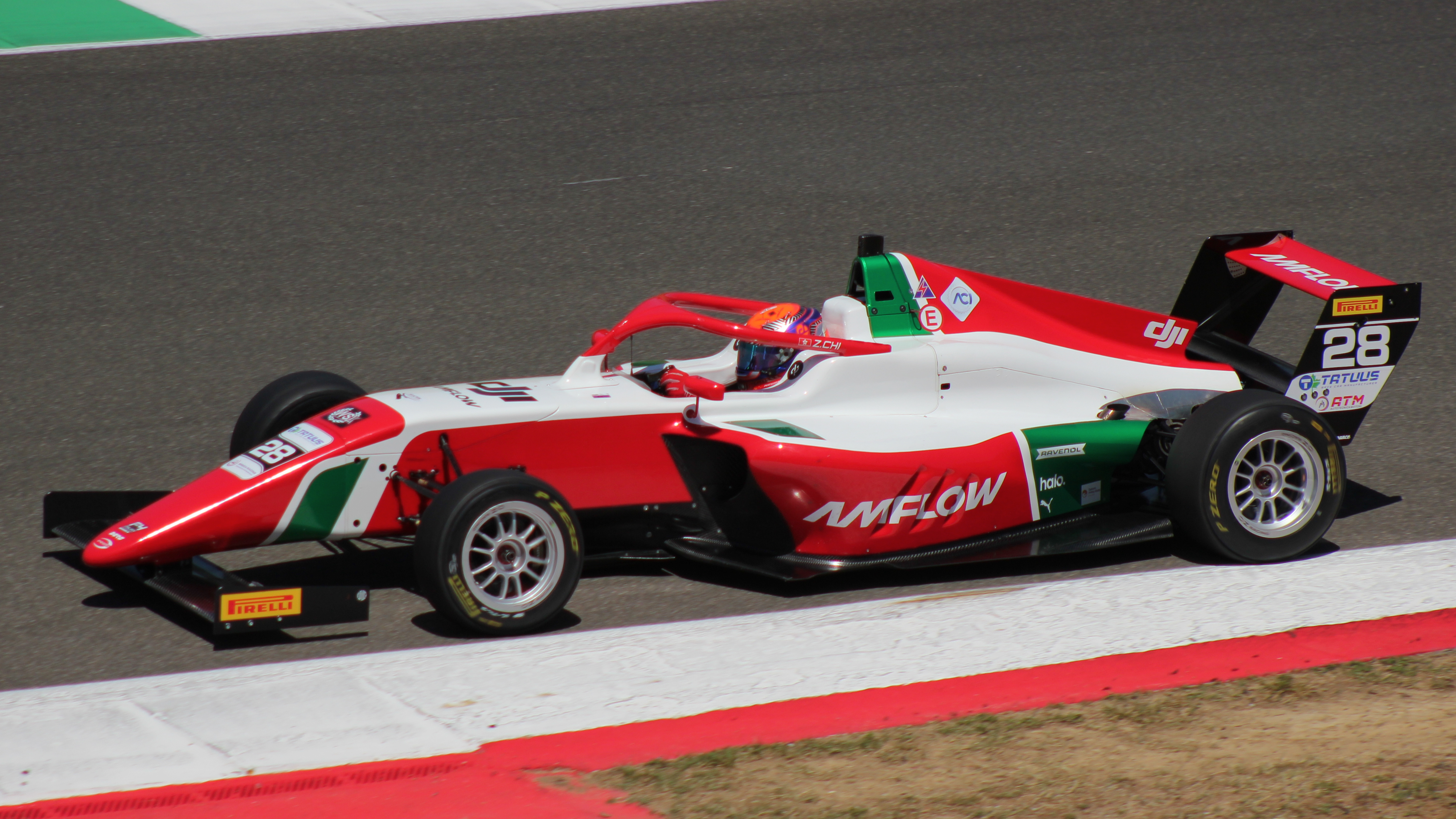
Chi driving at the Mugello Circuit during the 2025 Italian F4 Championship

Heading to Europe for the rest of the year, Chi finished fifth on his Italian F4 debut at Misano, and finished the other two races to leave Misano ninth in the overall standings and second in the rookies'. Following the round at Vallelunga, where Chi finished no higher than ninth, the Chinese finished the first two races at Monza outside the points before taking his maiden win in single-seaters in race three, having taken the lead in the closing stages. In the following round at Mugello, Chi once again stood on the podium as he finished second behind Alex Powell in race two, before finishing third in race three at Imola three weeks later as he completed a Prema Racing 1-2-3. Chi then ended the year by finishing second in race two at Misano en route to a fifth-place finish in his only season in the series. In E4 meanwhile, Chi scored a best result of fifth in race two at Monza and closed out the three-round campaign 12th in points.

=== Formula Regional (2025–2026) ===
==== 2025 ====
During 2025, Chi joined CL Motorsport in Formula Regional Europe to make his debut in Formula Regional competition at the Red Bull Ring. Competing in the Red Bull Ring and Hockenheimring rounds, he scored a best result of 17th in race two of the latter round. Towards the end of the year, Chi made a one-off appearance for Hillspeed in the GB3 Championship, as well as competing in the Macau Grand Prix for Van Amersfoort Racing.

==== 2026 ====
During the winter, Chi raced in the Formula Regional Middle East Trophy with CL Motorsport. In the four-round winter series, Chi scored a best result of sixth in race two at Dubai en route to a 16th-place points finish. For his main campaign, Chi joined MP Motorsport to compete in the Formula Regional European Championship. In his maiden season in FREC, Chi scored a best result of fourth three times en route to an eighth-place finish in points. At the end of the year, he returned to CL Motorsport for the Macau Grand Prix.

=== FIA Formula 3 (2027) ===
Chi stepped up to Formula Three in 2027 with MP Motorsport, partnering Matteo De Palo and Maciej Gładysz.

=== Formula One ===
In April 2026, Chi was announced as a member of the Aston Martin Driver Development Programme.

== Karting record ==
=== Karting career summary ===
Season	Series	Team	Position
2016	Rotax Max Challenge China — Micro B	SKA	?
2017	Rotax Max Challenge China — Micro A		?
2018	China Karting Championship — Mini		?
2018	Rotax Max Challenge Chinese Cup — Micro		?
2018	Rok Cup China — Micro Rok		?
2019	WSK Champions Cup — 60 Mini	Parolin Motorsport	NC
2019	WSK Super Master Series — 60 Mini	Parolin Motorsport; Energy Corse Srl (Note: Chi competed for Parolin Motorsport in Round 1 and competed for Energy Corse Srl in rounds 2, 4.)	64th
2019	South Garda Winter Cup — Mini Rok	Energy Corse Srl	NC
2019	WSK Euro Series — 60 Mini	Energy Corse Srl	69th
2019	Andrea Margutti Trophy — 60 Mini	Energy Corse Srl	20th
2019	WSK Open Cup — 60 Mini	Energy Corse Srl	32nd
2019	WSK Final Cup — 60 Mini	Energy Corse Srl	29th
2020	China Karting Championship — Mini		?
2020	WSK Champions Cup — 60 Mini	Gamoto ASD	NC
2020	WSK Super Master Series — 60 Mini	Gamoto ASD	57th
2020	South Garda Winter Cup — Mini Rok	Gamoto ASD	24th
2020	WSK Open Cup — 60 Mini	Gamoto ASD	41st
2021	WSK Champions Cup — 60 Mini	Babyrace Driver Academy	18th
2021	WSK Super Master Series — 60 Mini	Babyrace Driver Academy	29th
2021	Andrea Margutti Trophy — 60 Mini	Babyrace Driver Academy	11th
2021	WSK Euro Series — 60 Mini	Babyrace Driver Academy	30th
2021	IAME Euro Series — X30 Junior	Team Driver Racing Kart	44th
2021	IAME Warriors Final — X30 Junior	Team Driver Racing Kart	20th
2021	WSK Open Cup — OKJ	KR Motorsport	57th
2021	Trofeo Delle Industrie — OKJ	Beyond Racing Team	3rd
2021	South Garda Winter Cup — OKJ	Beyond Racing Team	19th
2021	WSK Final Cup — OKJ	Beyond Racing Team	24th
2022	WSK Champions Cup — OKJ	Beyond Racing Team	2nd
2022	Andrea Margutti Trophy — OKJ	Beyond Racing Team	11th
2022	WSK Euro Series — OKJ	Beyond Racing Team	46th
2022	Karting World Championship — OKJ	Beyond Racing Team	24th
2022	WSK Open Cup — OKJ	Beyond Racing Team	6th
2022	Trofeo Delle Industrie — OKJ	Beyond Racing Team	7th
2022	WSK Final Cup — OKJ	Beyond Racing Team	9th
2022	WSK Super Master Series — OKJ	KR Motorsport	45th
2022	Champions of the Future Winter Series — OKJ	KR Motorsport	7th
2022	Champions of the Future Euro Series — OKJ (Note: Chi competed for KR Motorsport in Rounds 1–3 and competed for Beyond Racing Team in round 4.)	KR Motorsport	35th
2022	Karting European Championship — OKJ	KR Motorsport	41st
2022	Italian Karting Championship — OKJ		NC
2023	South Garda Winter Cup — OK	Beyond Racing Team	13th
2023	WSK Champions Cup — OK	Beyond Racing Team	10th
2023	WSK Super Master Series — OK	Beyond Racing Team	32nd
2023	Champions of the Future — OK	Beyond Racing Team	51st
2023	Karting European Championship — OK	Beyond Racing Team	96th

== Racing record ==
=== Racing career summary ===
Season	Series	Team	Races	Wins	Poles	F/Laps	Podiums	Points	Position
2024	Formula Trophy UAE	Mumbai Falcons Racing Limited	9	0	1	0	2	54	5th
2025	F4 Middle East Championship	Prema Racing	15	0	0	0	0	78	9th
2025	Italian F4 Championship	Prema Racing	20	1	0	0	4	162	5th
2025	E4 Championship	Prema Racing	9	0	0	0	0	19	12th
2025	Formula Regional European Championship	CL Motorsport	4	0	0	0	0	0	33rd
2025	GB3 Championship	Hillspeed	3	0	0	0	0	0	NC†
2025	Macau Grand Prix	Van Amersfoort Racing	1	0	0	0	0	—N/a	DNF
2026	Formula Regional Middle East Trophy	CL Motorsport	11	0	0	0	0	20	16th
2026	Macau Grand Prix	CL Motorsport	0	0	0	0	0	—N/a	TBD
2026	Formula Regional European Championship	MP Motorsport	19	0	0	1	0	73	8th
2027	FIA Formula 3 Championship	MP Motorsport	0	0	0	0	0	0	TBD

^{*} Season still in progress.

=== Complete Formula Trophy UAE results ===
(key) (Races in bold indicate pole position; races in italics indicate fastest lap)

Year	Team	1	2	3	4	5	6	7	DC	Points
2024	Mumbai Falcons Racing Limited	DUB; 1; 3	DUB; 2; 11	DUB; 3; 14	YMC1; 1; 4	YMC1; 2; 10	YMC2; 1; 2	**YMC2**; **2**; 6	5th	54

=== Complete F4 Middle East Championship results ===
(key) (Races in bold indicate pole position; races in italics indicate fastest lap)

Year	Team	1	2	3	4	5	6	7	8	9	10	11	12	13	14	15	DC	Points
2025	Prema Racing	YMC1; 1; 5	YMC1; 2; 13	YMC1; 3; 7	YMC2; 1; 11	YMC2; 2; 10	YMC2; 3; 9	DUB; 1; 5	DUB; 2; 24	DUB; 3; 12	YMC3; 1; 7	YMC3; 2; 5	YMC3; 3 Ret	LUS; 1; 9	LUS; 2; 9	LUS; 3; 7	9th	78

=== Complete Italian F4 Championship results ===
(key) (Races in bold indicate pole position; races in italics indicate fastest lap)

Year	Team	1	2	3	4	5	6	7	8	9	10	11	12	13	14	15	16	17	18	19	20	21	22	23	24	25	DC	Points
2025	Prema Racing	MIS1; 1; 5	MIS1; 2	MIS1; 3; 7	MIS1; 4; 9	VLL; 1; 9	VLL; 2; 9	VLL; 3	VLL; 4; 28	MNZ; 1; 28	MNZ; 2; 17	MNZ; 3; 1	MUG; 1; 9	MUG; 2; 2	MUG; 3; 8	IMO; 1; 6	IMO; 2 C	IMO; 3; 3	CAT; 1; 4	CAT; 2; 7	CAT; 3 C	MIS2; 1	MIS2; 2; 2	MIS2; 3; 5	MIS2; 4; 4	MIS2; 5; 4	5th	162

=== Complete E4 Championship results ===
(key) (Races in bold indicate pole position; races in italics indicate fastest lap)

Year	Team	1	2	3	4	5	6	7	8	9	DC	Points
2025	Prema Racing	LEC; 1; 8	LEC; 2 Ret	LEC; 3; 18	MUG; 1; 29†	MUG; 2; 10	MUG; 3; 8	MNZ; 1; 14	MNZ; 2; 5	MNZ; 3; 27†	12th	19

=== Complete Formula Regional European Championship results ===
(key) (Races in bold indicate pole position) (Races in italics indicate fastest lap)

Year	Team	1	2	3	4	5	6	7	8	9	10	11	12	13	14	15	16	17	18	19	20	DC	Points
2025	CL Motorsport	MIS; 1	MIS; 2	SPA; 1	SPA; 2	ZAN; 1	ZAN; 2	HUN; 1	HUN; 2	LEC; 1	LEC; 2	IMO; 1	IMO; 2	RBR; 1 Ret	RBR; 2; 22	CAT; 1	CAT; 2	HOC; 1; 24	HOC; 2; 17	MNZ; 1	MNZ; 2	33rd	0
2026	MP Motorsport	RBR; 1; 4	RBR; 2; 5	RBR; 3; 22	ZAN; 1; 8	ZAN; 2; 5	SPA; 1 Ret	SPA; 2 C	SPA; 3; 11	MNZ; 1; 6	MNZ; 2; 4	MNZ; 3; 12	HUN; 1; 15	HUN; 2; 26	LEC; 1; 6	LEC; 2; 7	IMO; 1; 14	IMO; 2; 26	IMO; 3; 23	HOC; 1; 4	HOC; 2; 15	8th	73

=== Complete Macau Grand Prix results ===
Year	Team	Car	Qualifying	Quali Race	Main Race
2025	(Netherlands) Van Amersfoort Racing	Tatuus F3 T-318	26th	26th	DNF
2026	(Italy) CL Motorsport	Tatuus T-326	TBD	TBD	TBD

=== Complete Formula Regional Middle East Trophy results ===
(key) (Races in bold indicate pole position) (Races in italics indicate fastest lap)

Year	Entrant	1	2	3	4	5	6	7	8	9	10	11	12	DC	Points
2026	CL Motorsport	YMC1; 1; 17	YMC1; 2; 9	YMC1; 3; 7	YMC2; 1; 21	YMC2; 2; 13	YMC2; 3; 23	DUB; 1; 8	DUB; 2; 6	DUB; 3; 27	LUS; 1; 25	LUS; 2 C	LUS; 3; 19	16th	20

=== Complete FIA Formula 3 Championship results ===
(key) (Races in bold indicate pole position) (Races in italics indicate fastest lap)

Year	Entrant	1	2	3	4	5	6	7	8	9	10	11	12	13	14	15	16	17	18	19	20	DC	Points
2027	MP Motorsport	BHR; SPR	BHR; FEA	JED; SPR	JED; FEA	MEL; SPR	MEL; FEA	MTL; SPR	MTL; FEA	MON; SPR	MON; FEA	SIL; SPR	SIL; FEA	RBR; SPR	RBR; FEA	MNZ; SPR	MNZ; FEA	MAD; SPR	MAD; FEA	IST; SPR	IST; FEA	TBD	TBD
