= Salim Hanna =

Colombian racing driver (born 2009)

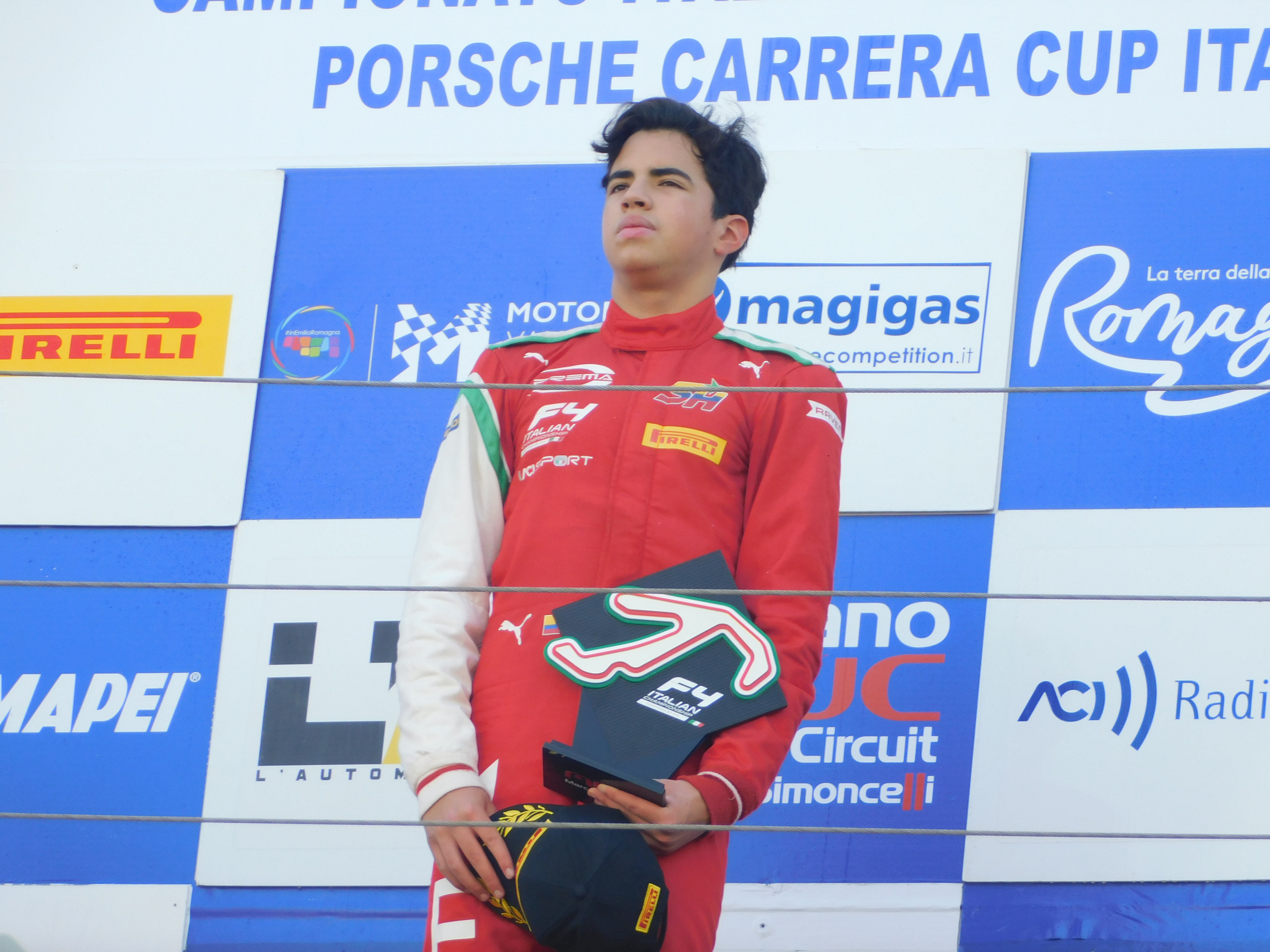
- Hanna in 2025
- Nationality: (Colombia) Colombian
- Born: Salim Hanna Hernández; 20 November 2009 (age 16) Barranquilla, Colombia

Formula Regional European Championship career
- Debut season: 2026
- Car number: 88
- Former teams: Prema Racing
- Starts: 19
- Wins: 1
- Podiums: 4
- Poles: 1
- Fastest laps: 1
- Best finish: 7th in 2026

Previous series
- 2026 2026 2025 2025 2025 2025 2024: FR European; FR Middle East; F4 British; E4; Italian F4; F4 Middle East; Formula Trophy UAE
- Statistics up to date as of 16 October 2026.

Salim Hanna Hernández (born 20 November 2009) is a Colombian racing driver who is set to compete in the FIA Formula 3 Championship with Campos Racing as part of the Ferrari Driver Academy.

Born in Barranquilla, Colombia, Hanna has raced with Prema in the 2025 Italian F4 Championship, finishing fourth overall, before moving up to Formula Regional Europe in 2026.

== Personal life ==
Hanna is the son of Jalil Hanna, a former racing driver and is of Lebanese descent.

== Career ==
=== Karting and single-seater debut (2016–2024) ===
Hanna began karting at the age of seven. During his karting career, in which he was coached by Juan Pablo Montoya, he most notably won the WSK Open Cup and Trofeo Delle Industrie in 2022, whilst racing in the OK-J class.

Hanna made his single-seater debut at the end of 2024, racing for Prema-run Mumbai Falcons Racing Limited in the Formula Trophy UAE. In the three-round series, Hanna scored a best result of fourth in the season-ending round at Yas Marina en route to seventh in points.

=== First full-time year in single-seaters and maiden wins (2025) ===
Remaining with Mumbai Falcons Racing Limited for the 2025 F4 Middle East Championship, Hanna scored his first podium in single-seaters at the third Yas Marina round by finishing second in race two, which helped him secure the rookie title and sixth overall.

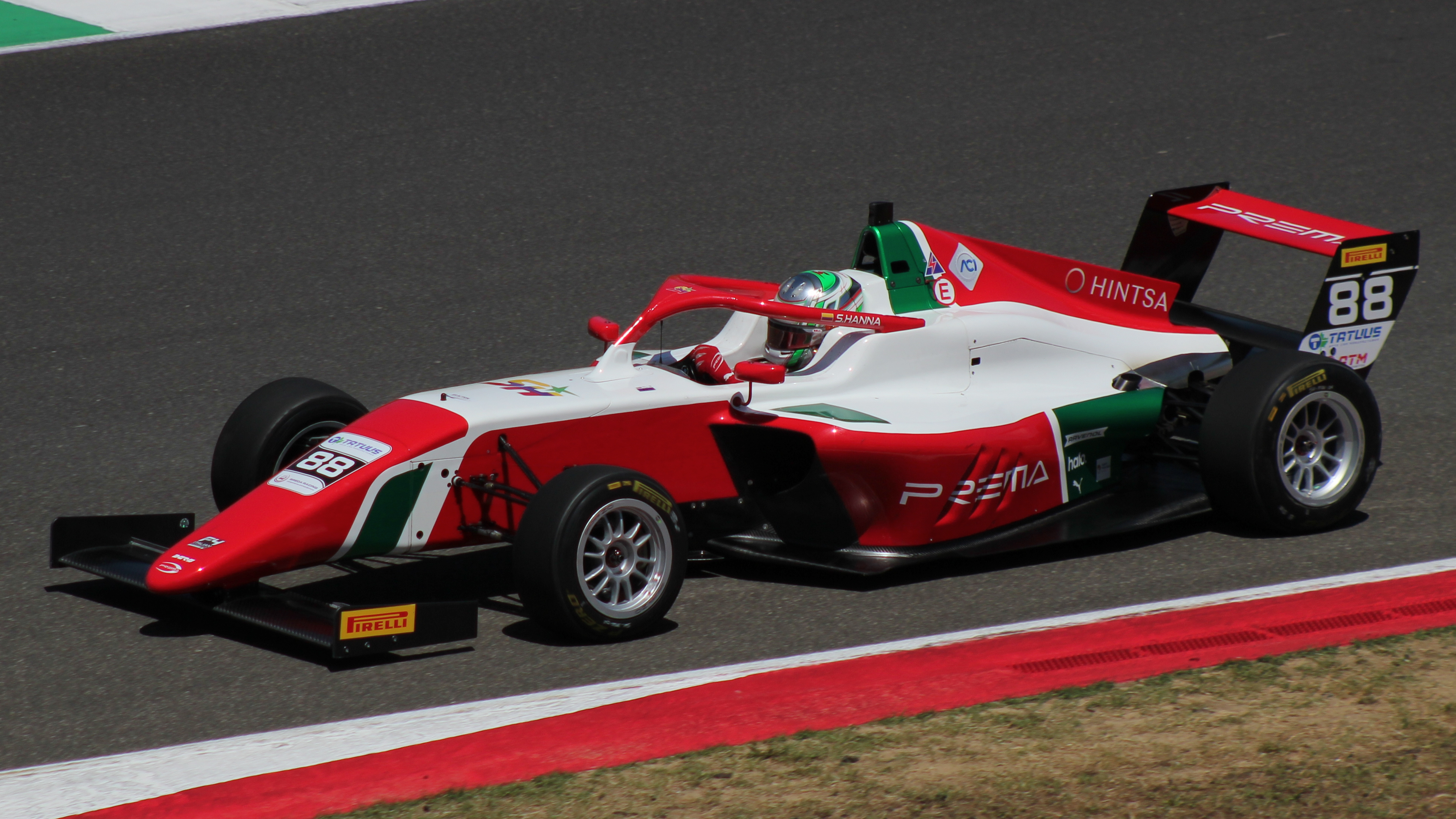
Hanna driving at the Mugello Circuit during the 2025 Italian F4 Championship

Hanna then moved to the Prema mainteam for the rest of 2025, competing in both the Italian F4 and E4 Championships. Opening up the season by qualifying on pole at Misano, Hanna then took his maiden Italian F4 podium by finishing second in race one, before closing out the weekend by finishing fourth and third in the other two races. Following that up with a third podium of the season at Vallelunga by finishing third in race four, Hanna then finished third in race three at Monza, but dropped to 30th after being given a 25-second penalty for causing a collision with Dante Vinci. A difficult weekend at Mugello then ensued, before he returned to the podium at Imola by finishing second in race one, a feat he repeated in the following round at Barcelona. In the season-ending Misano round, Hanna took his sixth and final podium of the season in race two as he ended the year fourth in points as the rookie champion. In E4, Hanna began the three-round season by finishing tenth in race one at Le Castellet. After not scoring points in the other two races, Hanna finished no lower than sixth in the following round at Mugello and was the highest finishing rookie in all three races. Hanna then scored his only podium of the season in race three at Monza by finishing second to Kean Nakamura-Berta en route to a seventh-place points finish.

During 2025, Hanna also joined Virtuosi Racing for a part-time schedule in the F4 British Championship. On his debut round at Thruxton, Hanna took his maiden win in single-seaters in race three ahead of his teammate Martin Molnár. Hanna then made his second and final appearance of the season in the British Grand Prix-supporting Silverstone round, dominating the weekend as he won both races.

=== Formula Regional (2026) ===
The following year, Hanna returned to Prema Racing-run Mumbai Falcons Racing Limited to step up to the Formula Regional Middle East Trophy. In the four-round winter series, Hanna scored his first win in Formula Regional competition in race two at Dubai en route to a tenth-place points finish. For the rest of 2026, Hanna remained with Prema to race in the Formula Regional European Championship. In his only season in the series, Hanna took three podiums between the Zandvoort and Monza rounds, before taking his only win of the season in the reverse-grid race at Imola to end the year seventh overall.

At the end of November, Hanna remained with Prema as he competed in the Macau Grand Prix.

=== FIA Formula 3 (2026–) ===
==== 2026 ====
Hanna competed in a one-off round in the 2026 FIA Formula 3 Championship during the Austrian round, taking over the injured Brad Benavides' seat at AIX Racing. He returned for another appearance with the team in the Budapest round.

==== 2027 ====
Hanna will be promoted to Formula Three full-time in 2027, joining reigning champions Campos Racing.

=== Formula One ===
In October 2026, Hanna was announced to be joining the Ferrari Driver Academy.

== Karting record ==
=== Karting career summary ===
Season	Series	Team	Position
2018	National Series Karting – Minime	Energy Corse	26th
2018	SKUSA SuperNationals – Micro Swift	Team Montoya	17th
2019	SKUSA Pro Tour – Mini Swift		15th
2019	Florida Winter Tour – Mini Rok	Team Montoya	22nd
2019	Biloxi ROK Fest – Mini Rok	Team Montoya	15th
2019	ROK the Rio – Mini Rok	Team Montoya	34th
2019	WSK Euro Series – 60 Mini	Gamoto	90th
2019	Rok Cup Superfinal – Mini Rok	Gamoto	NC
2019	SKUSA SuperNationals – Mini Swift		22nd
2020	SKUSA Winter Series – Mini Swift		10th
2020	Florida Winter Tour – Mini Rok	Team Montoya	7th
2020	SKUSA Pro Tour – Mini Swift		6th
2020	WSK Euro Series – 60 Mini	Energy Corse	38th
2020	ROK Cup International Final – Mini Rok	Energy Corse	4th
2020	Andrea Margutti Trophy – 60 Mini	Energy Corse	34th
2020	WSK Open Cup – 60 Mini	Energy Corse	8th
2021	WSK Champions Cup – OK-J	Birel ART Racing	NC
2021	WSK Super Master Series – OK-J	Birel ART Racing; Ricky Flynn Motorsport (Note: Hanna competed for Birel ART Racing in rounds 1-2 and for Ricky Flynn Motorsport in rounds 3-4.)	57th
2021	WSK Euro Series – OK-J	Ricky Flynn Motorsport	51st
2021	Champions of the Future – OK-J	Ricky Flynn Motorsport	90th
2021	Karting European Championship – OK-J	Ricky Flynn Motorsport	64th
2021	Deutsche Kart-Meisterschaft – OK-J	Ricky Flynn Motorsport	43rd
2021	WSK Open Cup – OK-J	Ricky Flynn Motorsport	59th
2021	Karting World Championship – OK-J	Ricky Flynn Motorsport	NC
2021	South Garda Winter Cup – OK-J	Ricky Flynn Motorsport	NC
2021	WSK Final Cup – OK-J	Ricky Flynn Motorsport	33rd
2021	Italian Karting Championship – X30 Junior		56th
2021	Karting Academy Trophy	Jalil Hanna	9th
2021	SKUSA SuperNationals – X30 Junior	Team Montoya	16th
2021	SKUSA SuperNationals – KA 100 Jr.	Team Montoya	3rd
2022	WSK Super Master Series – OK-J	Ricky Flynn Motorsport	27th
2022	Champions of the Future Winter Series – OK-J	Ricky Flynn Motorsport	32nd
2022	Champions of the Future – OK-J	Ricky Flynn Motorsport	45th
2022	Karting European Championship – OK-J (Note: Hanna competed for Ricky Flynn Motorsport in rounds 1-3 and for Ward Racing in round 4.)	Ricky Flynn Motorsport	26th
2022	Karting World Championship – OK-J	Ricky Flynn Motorsport	13th
2022	WSK Open Cup – OK-J	Ricky Flynn Motorsport	1st
2022	Trofeo delle Industrie – OK-J	Ricky Flynn Motorsport	1st
2022	WSK Final Cup – OK-J	Ricky Flynn Motorsport	8th
2022	LeCont Trophy – OK-J	Ricky Flynn Motorsport	8th
2022	Italian Karting Championship – OK-J		40th
2023	WSK Super Master Series – OK-J	Ricky Flynn Motorsport	4th
2023	Karting European Championship – OK-J	Ricky Flynn Motorsport	18th
2023	Champions of the Future – OK-J	Ricky Flynn Motorsport; Prema Racing (Note: Hanna competed for Ricky Flynn Motorsport in rounds 1-4 and for Prema Racing in round 5.)	19th
2023	WSK Euro Series – OK-J	Prema Racing	25th
2023	Karting World Championship – OK-J	Prema Racing	21st
2023	WSK Open Cup – OK-J	Prema Racing	14th
2024	WSK Champions Cup – OK	Prema Racing	3rd
2024	WSK Super Master Series – OK	Prema Racing	5th
2024	IAME Winter Series – X30 Senior	Prema Racing	NC
2024	Champions of the Future – OK	Prema Racing	10th
2024	Karting European Championship – OK	Prema Racing	12th
2024	Karting World Championship – OK	Prema Racing	20th
2024	WSK Euro Series – OK	KR Motorsport	12th

== Racing record ==
=== Racing career summary ===
Season	Series	Team	Races	Wins	Poles	F/Laps	Podiums	Points	Position
2024	Formula Trophy UAE	Mumbai Falcons Racing Limited	7	0	0	0	0	40	7th
2025	F4 Middle East Championship	Mumbai Falcons Racing Limited	15	0	0	0	1	112	6th
2025	Italian F4 Championship	Prema Racing	20	0	1	0	6	180	4th
2025	E4 Championship	Prema Racing	9	0	0	0	1	55	7th
2025	F4 British Championship	Virtuosi Racing	5	3	1	2	3	41	19th
2026	Formula Regional Middle East Trophy	Mumbai Falcons Racing Limited	11	1	0	0	1	54	10th
2026	Formula Regional European Championship	Prema Racing	19	1	0	1	4	92	7th
2026	FIA Formula 3 Championship	AIX Racing	4	0	0	0	0	0	35th
2026	Macau Grand Prix	Prema Racing						—N/a	
2027	FIA Formula 3 Championship	Campos Racing	0	0	0	0	0	0	TBD

* Season still in progress.

=== Complete Formula Trophy UAE results ===
(key) (Races in bold indicate pole position; races in italics indicate fastest lap)

Year	Team	1	2	3	4	5	6	7	DC	Points
2024	Mumbai Falcons Racing Limited	DUB; 1; 7	DUB; 2; 5	DUB; 3; 13	YMC1; 1; 9	YMC1; 2; 11	YMC2; 1; 4	YMC2; 2; 5	7th	40

=== Complete F4 Middle East Championship results ===
(key) (Races in bold indicate pole position; races in italics indicate fastest lap)

Year	Team	1	2	3	4	5	6	7	8	9	10	11	12	13	14	15	DC	Points
2025	Mumbai Falcons Racing Limited	YMC1; 1; 4	YMC1; 2; 17	YMC1; 3; 24†	YMC2; 1 Ret	YMC2; 2; 17	YMC2; 3; 6	DUB; 1; 4	DUB; 2; 5	DUB; 3; 6	YMC3; 1; 5	YMC3; 2; 2	YMC3; 3; 5	LUS; 1; 13	LUS; 2 Ret	LUS; 3; 9	6th	112

=== Complete Italian F4 Championship results ===
(key) (Races in bold indicate pole position; races in italics indicate fastest lap)

Year	Team	1	2	3	4	5	6	7	8	9	10	11	12	13	14	15	16	17	18	19	20	21	22	23	24	25	DC	Points
2025	Prema Racing	**MIS1**; **1**; 2	MIS1; 2; 4	MIS1; 3	MIS1; 4; 3	VLL; 1; 5	VLL; 2; 13	VLL; 3	VLL; 4; 3	MNZ; 1; 4	MNZ; 2 Ret	MNZ; 3; 30	MUG; 1; 11	MUG; 2; 16	MUG; 3; 7	IMO; 1; 2	IMO; 2 C	IMO; 3; 5	CAT; 1; 2	CAT; 2; 8	CAT; 3 C	MIS2; 1; 5	MIS2; 2	MIS2; 3; 2	MIS2; 4; 7	MIS2; 5; 6	4th	180

=== Complete F4 British Championship results ===
(key) (Races in bold indicate pole position; races in italics indicate fastest lap)

Year	Team	1	2	3	4	5	6	7	8	9	10	11	12	13	14	15	16	17	18	19	20	21	22	23	24	25	26	27	28	29	30	31	32	DC	Points
2025	Virtuosi Racing	DPN; 1	DPN; 2	DPN; 3	SILGP; 1	SILGP; 2	SILGP; 3	SNE; 1	SNE; 2	SNE; 3	THR; 1; 5	THR; 2; 7^{4}	THR; 3; 1	OUL; 1	OUL; 2	OUL; 3	**SILGP**; **1**; 1	SILGP; 2; 1	ZAN; 1	ZAN; 2	ZAN; 3	KNO; 1	KNO; 2	KNO; 3	DPGP; 1	DPGP; 2	DPGP; 3	SILN; 1	SILN; 2	SILN; 3	BHGP; 1	BHGP; 2	BHGP; 3	19th	41

=== Complete E4 Championship results ===
(key) (Races in bold indicate pole position; races in italics indicate fastest lap)

Year	Team	1	2	3	4	5	6	7	8	9	DC	Points
2025	Prema Racing	LEC; 1; 10	LEC; 2; 24	LEC; 3; 25	MUG; 1; 4	MUG; 2; 4	MUG; 3; 6	MNZ; 1; 17	MNZ; 2; 8	MNZ; 3; 2	7th	55

=== Complete Formula Regional Middle East Trophy results ===
(key) (Races in bold indicate pole position) (Races in italics indicate fastest lap)

Year	Entrant	1	2	3	4	5	6	7	8	9	10	11	12	DC	Points
2026	Mumbai Falcons Racing Limited	YMC1; 1; 15	YMC1; 2; 4	YMC1; 3; 20	YMC2; 1; 24	YMC2; 2; 21	YMC2; 3; 12	DUB; 1; 11	DUB; 2; 1	DUB; 3; 6	LUS; 1; 10	LUS; 2 C	LUS; 3; 6	10th	54

=== Complete Formula Regional European Championship results ===
(key) (Races in bold indicate pole position) (Races in italics indicate fastest lap)

Year	Team	1	2	3	4	5	6	7	8	9	10	11	12	13	14	15	16	17	18	19	20	DC	Points
2026	Prema Racing	RBR; 1; 11	RBR; 2; 10	RBR; 3; 4	ZAN; 1; 2	ZAN; 2; 14	SPA; 1; 11	SPA; 2 C	SPA; 3; 21	MNZ; 1; 3	MNZ; 2; 2	MNZ; 3; 8	HUN; 1; 13	HUN; 2 Ret	LEC; 1; 17	LEC; 2; 12	IMO; 1; 8	IMO; 2; 1	IMO; 3 Ret	HOC; 1; 7	HOC; 2; 5	7th	92

=== Complete FIA Formula 3 Championship results ===
(key) (Races in bold indicate pole position) (Races in italics indicate fastest lap)

Year	Entrant	1	2	3	4	5	6	7	8	9	10	11	12	13	14	15	16	17	18	19	20	DC	Points
2026	AIX Racing	MEL; SPR	MEL; FEA	MON; SPR	MON; FEA	CAT; SPR	CAT; FEA	RBR; SPR; 26	RBR; FEA; 19	SIL; SPR	SIL; FEA	SPA; SPR	SPA; FEA	HUN; SPR; 24	HUN; FEA; Ret	MNZ; SPR	MNZ; FEA	MAD; SPR	MAD; FEA1	MAD; FEA2		35th	0
2027	Campos Racing	BHR; SPR	BHR; FEA	JED; SPR	JED; FEA	MEL; SPR	MEL; FEA	MTL; SPR	MTL; FEA	MON; SPR	MON; FEA	SIL; SPR	SIL; FEA	RBR; SPR	RBR; FEA	MNZ; SPR	MNZ; FEA	MAD; SPR	MAD; FEA	IST; SPR	IST; FEA	TBD	TBD

=== Complete Macau Grand Prix results ===
Year	Team	Car	Qualifying	Quali Race	Main Race
2026	(Italy) Prema Racing	Tatuus T-326	TBD	TBD	TBD
