= 2025 F4 Middle East Championship =

Motor racing competition

The 2025 F4 Middle East Championship was the only season of the F4 Middle East Championship, the successor of the Formula 4 UAE Championship, a motor racing series for the Middle East regulated according to FIA Formula 4 regulations, and organised and promoted by the Emirates Motorsport Organization (EMSO) and Top Speed.

The season commenced on 18 January at the Yas Marina Circuit and concluded on 28 February at Lusail International Circuit.

== Teams and drivers ==
Team	No.	Drivers	Class	Rounds
(Australia) Evans GP	2	(Hungary) Martin Molnár		All
(Australia) Evans GP	3	(Macau) Tiago Rodrigues		All
(Australia) Evans GP	4	(Saudi Arabia) Farah Al Yousef	R	All
(Australia) Evans GP	24	(Australia) Seth Gilmore		All
(India) Mumbai Falcons Racing Limited	7	(India) Arjun Chheda		All
(India) Mumbai Falcons Racing Limited	33	(Latvia) Tomass Štolcermanis		All
(India) Mumbai Falcons Racing Limited	51	(United Kingdom) Kean Nakamura-Berta (Note: Nakamura-Berta is a Japanese-Slovak driver competing under a British licence.)		All
(India) Mumbai Falcons Racing Limited	88	(Colombia) Salim Hanna	R	All
(United Arab Emirates) AKCEL GP / PHM Racing	8	(United Arab Emirates) Hamda Al Qubaisi		1
(United Arab Emirates) AKCEL GP / PHM Racing	11	(Netherlands) Reno Francot		All
(United Arab Emirates) AKCEL GP / PHM Racing	13	(Romania) David Cosma Cristofor	R	All
(United Arab Emirates) AKCEL GP / PHM Racing	14	(South Africa) Aqil Alibhai		2
(United Arab Emirates) AKCEL GP / PHM Racing	58	(Japan) Yuta Suzuki	R	3–4
(United Arab Emirates) Yas Heat Racing Academy	12	(United Arab Emirates) Adam Al Azhari		All
(United Arab Emirates) Yas Heat Racing Academy	47	(United Arab Emirates) August Raber (Note: Raber is a Swedish driver competing under an Emirati licence.)		All
(Republic of Ireland) Pinnacle Motorsport	15	(China) Wang Yuzhe		All
(Republic of Ireland) Pinnacle Motorsport	16	(South Korea) Kyuho Lee	R	1–2
(Republic of Ireland) Pinnacle Motorsport	58	(Japan) Yuta Suzuki	R	1–2
(Republic of Ireland) Pinnacle Motorsport	77	(Kyrgyzstan) Georgy Zhuravskiy (Note: Zhuravskiy is a Russian driver competing under a Kyrgyz licence.)		3
(Qatar) QMMF	18	(Qatar) Tameem Hassiba	R	All
(Qatar) QMMF	20	(Qatar) Taha Hassiba	R	All
(Qatar) QMMF	95	(Qatar) Bader Al Sulaiti	R	All
(Italy) Prema Racing	27	(Ukraine) Oleksandr Bondarev	R	All
(Italy) Prema Racing	28	(Italy) Newman Chi (Note: Chi is a Chinese driver competing under an Italian licence.)	R	All
(Italy) Prema Racing	98	(United States) Sebastian Wheldon		All
(United Arab Emirates) Xcel Motorsport	29	(South Africa) Cole Hewetson	R	All
(United Arab Emirates) Xcel Motorsport	63	(China) Yuhao Fu		All
(United Arab Emirates) Xcel Motorsport	99	(Saudi Arabia) Abdullah Ayman Kamel	R	All
(France) R-ace GP	41	(United States) Alex Powell (Note: Powell is a Jamaican-American driver competing under an American licence.)		All
(France) R-ace GP	42	(United Kingdom) Emily Cotty	R	All
(France) R-ace GP	52	(Italy) Oleksandr Savinkov (Note: Savinkov is a Russo-Ukrainian driver competing under an Italian licence.)		All
(France) R-ace GP	68	(Italy) Emanuele Olivieri		All

Icon	Legend
R	Rookie

- Winfield Racing School announced its entry to the championship but did not appear in any round.

== Race calendar and results ==
The schedule consists of 15 races over 5 rounds. The opening two rounds at the Kuwait Motor Town were replaced by further two at the Yas Marina Circuit and the Jeddah Corniche Circuit was chosen as the final venue. Days before the start of the season, the calendar was changed once again, replacing the round at Jeddah Corniche Circuit with a round at Lusail International Circuit, also a debuting venue for the series.

Round		Circuit	Date	Pole position	Fastest lap	Winning driver	Winning team	Rookie winner	Supporting
1	R1	(United Arab Emirates) Yas Marina Circuit, Abu Dhabi (Grand Prix Circuit)	18 January	(Italy) Emanuele Olivieri	(United States) Alex Powell	(Italy) Emanuele Olivieri	(France) R-ace GP	(Colombia) Salim Hanna	24H Series Middle East Trophy; Formula Regional Middle East Championship; Renault Clio Cup Middle East; Gulf Radical Cup
1	R2	(United Arab Emirates) Yas Marina Circuit, Abu Dhabi (Grand Prix Circuit)	19 January		(United Kingdom) Kean Nakamura-Berta	(Latvia) Tomass Štolcermanis	(India) Mumbai Falcons Racing Limited	(Japan) Yuta Suzuki	24H Series Middle East Trophy; Formula Regional Middle East Championship; Renault Clio Cup Middle East; Gulf Radical Cup
1	R3	(United Arab Emirates) Yas Marina Circuit, Abu Dhabi (Grand Prix Circuit)	19 January	(United States) Alex Powell	(Italy) Emanuele Olivieri	(Italy) Emanuele Olivieri	(France) R-ace GP	(Italy) Newman Chi	24H Series Middle East Trophy; Formula Regional Middle East Championship; Renault Clio Cup Middle East; Gulf Radical Cup
2	R1	(United Arab Emirates) Yas Marina Circuit, Abu Dhabi (Corkscrew Circuit)	22 January	(Italy) Emanuele Olivieri	(Italy) Emanuele Olivieri	(Italy) Emanuele Olivieri	(France) R-ace GP	(Ukraine) Oleksandr Bondarev	Formula Regional Middle East Championship
2	R2	(United Arab Emirates) Yas Marina Circuit, Abu Dhabi (Corkscrew Circuit)	23 January		(Italy) Emanuele Olivieri	(United Arab Emirates) August Raber	(United Arab Emirates) Yas Heat Racing Academy	(Ukraine) Oleksandr Bondarev	Formula Regional Middle East Championship
2	R3	(United Arab Emirates) Yas Marina Circuit, Abu Dhabi (Corkscrew Circuit)	23 January	(Italy) Emanuele Olivieri	(Italy) Emanuele Olivieri	(Italy) Emanuele Olivieri	(France) R-ace GP	(Colombia) Salim Hanna	Formula Regional Middle East Championship
3	R1	(United Arab Emirates) Dubai Autodrome, Dubai (Grand Prix Circuit)	8 February	(Italy) Emanuele Olivieri	(Italy) Emanuele Olivieri	(Italy) Emanuele Olivieri	(France) R-ace GP	(Colombia) Salim Hanna	Asian Le Mans Series; Formula Regional Middle East Championship
3	R2	(United Arab Emirates) Dubai Autodrome, Dubai (Grand Prix Circuit)	9 February		(Italy) Emanuele Olivieri	(United States) Alex Powell	(France) R-ace GP	(Colombia) Salim Hanna	Asian Le Mans Series; Formula Regional Middle East Championship
3	R3	(United Arab Emirates) Dubai Autodrome, Dubai (Grand Prix Circuit)	9 February	(United States) Alex Powell	(United Kingdom) Kean Nakamura-Berta	(United States) Alex Powell	(France) R-ace GP	(Colombia) Salim Hanna	Asian Le Mans Series; Formula Regional Middle East Championship
4	R1	(United Arab Emirates) Yas Marina Circuit, Abu Dhabi (Grand Prix Circuit)	15 February	(Italy) Emanuele Olivieri	(Italy) Emanuele Olivieri	(United Kingdom) Kean Nakamura-Berta (Note: Olivieri originally won the race but received a 10 seconds penalty for jumping the start. Nakamura-Berta inherited the win.)	(India) Mumbai Falcons Racing Limited	(Colombia) Salim Hanna	Asian Le Mans Series; Formula Regional Middle East Championship; Renault Clio Cup Middle East
4	R2	(United Arab Emirates) Yas Marina Circuit, Abu Dhabi (Grand Prix Circuit)	16 February		(United States) Alex Powell	(Netherlands) Reno Francot	(United Arab Emirates) AKCEL GP / PHM Racing	(Colombia) Salim Hanna	Asian Le Mans Series; Formula Regional Middle East Championship; Renault Clio Cup Middle East
4	R3	(United Arab Emirates) Yas Marina Circuit, Abu Dhabi (Grand Prix Circuit)	16 February	(United States) Alex Powell	(Latvia) Tomass Štolcermanis	(United States) Alex Powell	(France) R-ace GP	(Colombia) Salim Hanna	Asian Le Mans Series; Formula Regional Middle East Championship; Renault Clio Cup Middle East
5	R1	(Qatar) Lusail International Circuit, Lusail (Grand Prix Circuit)	27 February	(United Arab Emirates) Adam Al Azhari	(United Arab Emirates) Adam Al Azhari	(Italy) Emanuele Olivieri	(France) R-ace GP	(Italy) Newman Chi	FIA World Endurance Championship; Formula Regional Middle East Championship
5	R2	(Qatar) Lusail International Circuit, Lusail (Grand Prix Circuit)	27 February		(Italy) Emanuele Olivieri	(United States) Alex Powell	(France) R-ace GP	(Italy) Newman Chi	FIA World Endurance Championship; Formula Regional Middle East Championship
5	R3	(Qatar) Lusail International Circuit, Lusail (Grand Prix Circuit)	28 February	(United States) Alex Powell	(Italy) Emanuele Olivieri	(United States) Alex Powell	(France) R-ace GP	(Italy) Newman Chi	FIA World Endurance Championship; Formula Regional Middle East Championship

== Championship standings ==
The championship's scoring system was overhauled in 2025. Points are awarded to the top twelve classified drivers, while two further points are awarded for taking a pole position in qualifying.

Position	**1st**	**2nd**	**3rd**	**4th**	**5th**	**6th**	**7th**	**8th**	**9th**	**10th**	**11th**	**12th**	Pole
Points	30	22	18	15	12	10	8	6	4	3	2	1	2

=== Drivers' Championship ===
Pos	Driver	YMC1 (United Arab Emirates)			YMC2 (United Arab Emirates)			DUB (United Arab Emirates)			YMC3 (United Arab Emirates)			LUS (Qatar)			Pts
Pos	Driver	R1	R2	R3	R1	R2	R3	R1	R2	R3	R1	R2	R3	R1	R2	R3	Pts
1	(Italy) Emanuele Olivieri	**1**	3	1	**1**	4	**1**	**1**	2	3	**3**	Ret	3	1	3	2	339
2	(United States) Alex Powell	27†	4	**12**	4	3	3	9	1	**1**	2	3	**1**	5	1	**1**	281
3	(United Kingdom) Kean Nakamura-Berta	2	2	2	3	5	2	3	3	2	1	21	4	2	4	4	273
4	(Latvia) Tomass Štolcermanis	8	1	3	2	6	13	2	4	5	4	10	2	4	5	6	212
5	(Netherlands) Reno Francot	6	6	4	6	2	4	17	26	4	9	1	8	6	2	3	187
6	(Colombia) Salim Hanna	4	17	24†	Ret	17	6	4	5	6	5	2	5	13	Ret	9	112
7	(United States) Sebastian Wheldon	3	7	5	25†	12	5	Ret	9	7	12	8	7	8	8	17	90
8	(United Arab Emirates) August Raber	18	24†	Ret	10	1	Ret	Ret	10	21	11	4	15	3	10	5	86
9	(Italy) Newman Chi	5	13	7	11	10	9	5	24	12	7	5	Ret	9	9	7	78
10	(United Arab Emirates) Adam Al Azhari	9	5	6	5	11	7	6	8	10	8	24	10	**DSQ**	23†	15	78
11	(Italy) Oleksandr Savinkov	7	8	10	9	8	8	7	6	Ret	23	23	17	10	6	Ret	64
12	(Ukraine) Oleksandr Bondarev	16	Ret	11	8	7	10	8	25	8	6	22	6	12	11	22	54
13	(Hungary) Martin Molnár	11	9	8	7	9	Ret	11	13	Ret	14	7	11	14	Ret	8	42
14	(Macau) Tiago Rodrigues	12	15	14	24†	19	Ret	12	Ret	9	15	13	9	7	7	10	29
15	(China) Yuhao Fu	Ret	10	15	16	16	14	10	7	15	10	6	14	Ret	14	24	27
16	(India) Arjun Chheda	13	Ret	Ret	21	22	12	25	15	11	13	9	22	Ret	17	18	7
17	(Romania) David Cosma Cristofor	23	12	13	12	20	15	22	20	13	17	12	16	16	12	11	6
18	(South Africa) Cole Hewetson	10	18	18	13	13	11	21	14	18	19	14	13	20	13	13	5
19	(Qatar) Taha Hassiba	21	20	Ret	Ret	26	16	15	11	19	18	19	19	11	18	12	5
20	(South Korea) Kyuho Lee	19	19	9	17	15	Ret										4
21	(United Kingdom) Emily Cotty	17	14	21	20	25	20	20	12	20	16	11	21	Ret	16	16	3
22	(Japan) Yuta Suzuki	15	11	17	Ret	21	19	13	Ret	14	Ret	15	20				2
23	(Qatar) Bader Al Sulaiti	26†	23	19	18	24	Ret	14	16	17	Ret	16	12	Ret	15	14	1
24	(South Africa) Aqil Alibhai				14	14	Ret										0
25	(Australia) Seth Gilmore	14	16	16	23	Ret	18	16	22	22	21	18	Ret	WD	WD	WD	0
26	(Saudi Arabia) Abdullah Ayman Kamel	24	21	Ret	15	18	22	Ret	18	Ret	25†	17	18	18	20	19	0
27	(Qatar) Tameem Hassiba	25	Ret	22	22	27	17	18	21	23	20	25	Ret	15	21	20	0
28	(Kyrgyzstan) Georgy Zhuravskiy							24	17	16							0
29	(China) Wang Yuzhe	22	22	20	19	23	21	19	19	24	22	20	23	17	19	21	0
30	(Saudi Arabia) Farah Al Yousef	Ret	Ret	23	26	28	23	23	23	25	24	26	24	19	22	23	0
31	(United Arab Emirates) Hamda Al Qubaisi	20	Ret	DNS													0
Pos	Driver	R1	R2	R3	R1	R2	R3	R1	R2	R3	R1	R2	R3	R1	R2	R3	Pts
Pos	Driver	YMC1 (United Arab Emirates)			YMC2 (United Arab Emirates)			DUB (United Arab Emirates)			YMC3 (United Arab Emirates)			LUS (Qatar)			Pts

Colour	Result
Gold	Winner
Silver	Second place
Bronze	Third place
Green	Points classification
Blue	Non-points classification
Blue	Non-classified finish (NC)
Purple	Retired, not classified (Ret)
Red	Did not qualify (DNQ)
Red	Did not pre-qualify (DNPQ)
Black	Disqualified (DSQ)
White	Did not start (DNS)
White	Withdrew (WD)
White	Race cancelled (C)
Blank	Did not practice (DNP)
Blank	Did not arrive (DNA)
Blank	Excluded (EX)

**Bold** – Pole
Italics – Fastest Lap
† — Did not finish, but classified

=== Rookies' Championship ===
Pos	Driver	YMC1 (United Arab Emirates)			YMC2 (United Arab Emirates)			DUB (United Arab Emirates)			YMC3 (United Arab Emirates)			LUS (Qatar)			Pts
Pos	Driver	R1	R2	R3	R1	R2	R3	R1	R2	R3	R1	R2	R3	R1	R2	R3	Pts
1	(Colombia) Salim Hanna	**1**	5	**11†**	**Ret**	5	**1**	**1**	1	**1**	1	1	**1**	4	Ret	2	317
2	(Italy) Newman Chi	2	3	1	2	2	2	2	10	3	3	2	Ret	1	1	**1**	311
3	(Ukraine) Oleksandr Bondarev	5	Ret	3	1	1	3	3	11	2	**2**	10	2	3	2	10	242
4	(Romania) David Cosma Cristofor	9	2	4	3	7	5	10	7	4	5	4	5	6	3	3	190
5	(South Africa) Cole Hewetson	3	6	6	4	3	4	9	4	7	7	5	4	9	4	5	179
6	(Qatar) Taha Hassiba	8	8	Ret	Ret	11	6	6	2	8	6	9	7	**2**	7	4	131
7	(United Kingdom) Emily Cotty	6	4	8	8	10	9	8	3	9	4	3	9	Ret	6	7	127
8	(Japan) Yuta Suzuki	4	1	5	Ret	8	8	4	Ret	5	Ret	6	8				112
9	(Qatar) Bader Al Sulaiti	12†	10	7	7	9	Ret	5	5	6	Ret	7	3	Ret	5	6	106
10	(Saudi Arabia) Abdullah Ayman Kamel	10	9	Ret	5	6	10	Ret	6	Ret	10	8	6	7	8	8	81
11	(Qatar) Tameem Hassiba	11	Ret	9	9	12	7	7	8	10	8	11	Ret	5	9	9	64
12	(South Korea) Kyuho Lee	7	7	2	6	4	Ret										63
13	(Saudi Arabia) Farah Al-Yousef	Ret	Ret	10	10	13	11	11	9	11	9	12	10	8	10	11	35
Pos	Driver	R1	R2	R3	R1	R2	R3	R1	R2	R3	R1	R2	R3	R1	R2	R3	Pts
Pos	Driver	YMC1 (United Arab Emirates)			YMC2 (United Arab Emirates)			DUB (United Arab Emirates)			YMC3 (United Arab Emirates)			LUS (Qatar)			Pts

Colour	Result
Gold	Winner
Silver	Second place
Bronze	Third place
Green	Points classification
Blue	Non-points classification
Blue	Non-classified finish (NC)
Purple	Retired, not classified (Ret)
Red	Did not qualify (DNQ)
Red	Did not pre-qualify (DNPQ)
Black	Disqualified (DSQ)
White	Did not start (DNS)
White	Withdrew (WD)
White	Race cancelled (C)
Blank	Did not practice (DNP)
Blank	Did not arrive (DNA)
Blank	Excluded (EX)

**Bold** – Pole
Italics – Fastest Lap
† — Did not finish, but classified

=== Teams' Championship ===
Ahead of each event, teams nominate two drivers who accumulate teams' points.

Pos	Team	No.	YMC1 (United Arab Emirates)			YMC2 (United Arab Emirates)			DUB (United Arab Emirates)			YMC3 (United Arab Emirates)			LUS (Qatar)			Pts
Pos	Team	No.	R1	R2	R3	R1	R2	R3	R1	R2	R3	R1	R2	R3	R1	R2	R3	Pts
1	(France) R-ace GP	41	27†	4	**12**	4	3	3	9	1	**1**	2	3	**1**	5	1	**1**	602
1	(France) R-ace GP	68	**1**	3	1	**1**	4	**1**	**1**	2	3	**3**	Ret	3	1	3	2	602
2	(India) Mumbai Falcons Racing Limited	33	8	1	3	2	6	13	2	4	5	4	10	2	4	5	6	485
2	(India) Mumbai Falcons Racing Limited	51	2	2	2	3	5	2	3	3	2	1	21	4	2	4	4	485
3	(United Arab Emirates) AKCEL GP / PHM Racing	8	20	Ret	DNS													192
3	(United Arab Emirates) AKCEL GP / PHM Racing	11	6	6	4	6	2	4	17	26	4	9	1	8	6	2	3	192
3	(United Arab Emirates) AKCEL GP / PHM Racing	13				12	20	15	22	20	13	17	12	16	16	12	11	192
4	(United Arab Emirates) Yas Heat Racing Academy	12	9	5	6	5	11	7	6	8	10	8	24	10	**DSQ**	23†	15	162
4	(United Arab Emirates) Yas Heat Racing Academy	47	18	24†	Ret	10	1	Ret	Ret	10	21	11	4	15	3	10	5	162
5	(Italy) Prema Racing	27													12	11	22	159
5	(Italy) Prema Racing	28	5	13	7	11	10	9	5	24	12	7	5	Ret	9	9	7	159
5	(Italy) Prema Racing	98	3	7	5	25†	12	5	Ret	9	7	12	8	7				159
6	(Australia) Evans GP	2	11	9	8	7	9	Ret	11	13	Ret	14	7	11	14	Ret	8	71
6	(Australia) Evans GP	3	12	15	14	24†	19	Ret	12	Ret	9	15	13	9	7	7	10	71
7	(United Arab Emirates) Xcel Motorsport	29	10	18	18	13	13	11	21	14	18	19	14	13	20	13	13	32
7	(United Arab Emirates) Xcel Motorsport	63	Ret	10	15	16	16	14	10	7	15	10	6	14	Ret	14	24	32
8	(Republic of Ireland) Pinnacle Motorsport	15							19	19	24	22	20	23	17	19	21	6
8	(Republic of Ireland) Pinnacle Motorsport	16	19	19	9	17	15	Ret										6
8	(Republic of Ireland) Pinnacle Motorsport	58	15	11	17	Ret	21	19										6
8	(Republic of Ireland) Pinnacle Motorsport	77							24	17	16							6
9	(Qatar) QMMF	20	21	20	Ret	Ret	26	16	15	11	19	18	19	19	11	18	12	6
9	(Qatar) QMMF	95	26†	23	19	18	24	Ret	14	16	17	Ret	16	12	Ret	15	14	6

== See also ==
- 2024 Formula Trophy UAE
