= 2025 Italian F4 Championship =

Motorsport event

The 2025 F4 Italian Championship powered by Abarth was the twelfth season of the Italian F4 Championship. The series also re-introduced the Women's Championship for the first time since 2023.

== Teams and drivers ==
Team	No.	Driver	Class	Rounds
(Netherlands) Van Amersfoort Racing	3	(Italy) Maksimilian Popov (Note: Kutskov and Severiukhin are Russian, but they compete under a Kyrgyz licence as Russian national emblems were banned by the FIA following the Russian invasion of Ukraine. Popov, a Russian-Grenadian, competes under an Italian licence for the same reason.)		All
(Netherlands) Van Amersfoort Racing	38	(Poland) Aleksander Ruta	R	All
(Netherlands) Van Amersfoort Racing	66	(Australia) Dante Vinci	R	All
(Netherlands) Van Amersfoort Racing	67	(Norway) Marcus Sæter	R	All
(Netherlands) Van Amersfoort Racing	94	(United States) Payton Westcott	R W	All
(Germany) US Racing	4	(Serbia) Andrija Kostić		All
(Germany) US Racing	7	(Finland) Luka Sammalisto		All
(Germany) US Racing	19	(Singapore) Kabir Anurag		All
(Germany) US Racing	29	(Italy) Ludovico Busso	R	6–7
(Germany) US Racing	46	(India) Ary Bansal		7
(Germany) US Racing	50	(Czech Republic) Jan Koller		1–3, 6–7
(Germany) US Racing	71	(Germany) Maxim Rehm		1–5
(Germany) US Racing	78	(Brazil) Gabriel Gomez		All
(Germany) PHM Racing	5	(Italy) Andrea Dupé (Note: Dupé is a French driver competing under an Italian licence.)	R	1–3
(Germany) PHM Racing	13	(Romania) David Cosma Cristofor	R	All
(Germany) PHM Racing	69	(Netherlands) Reno Francot		4–5, 7
(Italy) Prema Racing	5	(Italy) Andrea Dupé	R	4–7
(Italy) Prema Racing	27	(Ukraine) Oleksandr Bondarev	R	All
(Italy) Prema Racing	28	(Italy) Newman Chi (Note: Chi is a Chinese driver competing under an Italian licence.)	R	All
(Italy) Prema Racing	33	(Latvia) Tomass Štolcermanis		1–2
(Italy) Prema Racing	51	(Japan) Kean Nakamura-Berta		All
(Italy) Prema Racing	88	(Colombia) Salim Hanna	R	All
(Italy) Prema Racing	98	(United States) Sebastian Wheldon		All
(Italy) BVM Racing	8	(Italy) Niccolò Maccagnani	R	7
(France) R-ace GP	10	(France) Andy Consani	R	6–7
(France) R-ace GP	11	(Romania) Luca Viișoreanu		6
(France) R-ace GP	41	(United States) Alex Powell (Note: Powell is a Jamaican-American driver competing under an American licence.)		All
(France) R-ace GP	42	(United Kingdom) Emily Cotty	R W	All
(France) R-ace GP	44	(Israel) Guy Albag	R	All
(France) R-ace GP	52	(Italy) Oleksandr Savinkov (Note: Savinkov is a Russo-Ukrainian driver who competed under a Ukrainian licence at rounds 1–2 and an Italian licence in rounds 3–5 and 7.)		1–5, 7
(France) R-ace GP	68	(Italy) Emanuele Olivieri		All
(Romania) Real Racing	11	(Romania) Luca Viișoreanu		1–5
(Romania) Real Racing	81	(Romania) Andrei Dună		1
(Italy) Cram Motorsport	16	(Italy) Oscar Repetto (Note: Repetto is a New Zealand and Monégasque driver competing under an Italian licence.)	R	7
(Italy) Cram Motorsport	16	(United States) Andre Rodriguez	R	6
(Italy) Cram Motorsport	37	(United States) Andre Rodriguez	R	3, 7
(Italy) Cram Motorsport	39	(Germany) Elia Weiss	R	All
(Slovenia) AS Motorsport	18	(Germany) Mathilda Paatz	W	7
(Slovenia) AS Motorsport	86	(Germany) Mathilda Paatz	W	6
(Slovenia) AS Motorsport	95	(Germany) Phil Colin Strenge	R	All
(Switzerland) Jenzer Motorsport	20	(Switzerland) Enea Frey		1–5
(Switzerland) Jenzer Motorsport	21	(Argentina) Teo Schropp		All
(Switzerland) Jenzer Motorsport	23	(Kyrgyzstan) Artem Severiukhin	R	All
(Switzerland) Jenzer Motorsport	24	(Mexico) Javier Herrera	R	3, 5
(Switzerland) Jenzer Motorsport	25	(Switzerland) Florentin Hattemer	R	7
(Switzerland) Jenzer Motorsport	26	(Qatar) Bader Al Sulaiti	R	All
(Switzerland) Jenzer Motorsport	56	(Mexico) Nicolás Cortés	R	7
(Switzerland) Jenzer Motorsport	77	(United Kingdom) Bart Harrison		All
(Switzerland) Maffi Racing	22	(Switzerland) Nathanaël Berreby		All
(Switzerland) Maffi Racing	31	(Kyrgyzstan) Kirill Kutskov	(Note: Kutskov was being classified as a rookie until Vallelunga race 2.)	All
(Switzerland) Maffi Racing	45	(Denmark) David Walther	R	All
(Switzerland) Maffi Racing	91	(Poland) Kornelia Olkucka	R W	All
(Italy) Viola Formula Racing	29	(Italy) Ludovico Busso	R	1–5
(Italy) Viola Formula Racing	30	(Turkey) Emir Tanju		1–2
(Italy) Viola Formula Racing	35	(France) Arthur Lorimier	R	1–5
(Italy) Technorace	87	(Italy) Francesco Coppola		1–5, 7
(Italy) Technorace	89	(Italy) Antonio Errigo	R	7

Icon	Legend
R	Rookie
W	Woman Trophy

- Andrea Dupé was scheduled to compete for AS Motorsport, but switched to PHM Racing prior to the start of the season.

== Race calendar and results ==
The calendar was revealed on 27 September 2024.

Round		Circuit	Date	Pole position	Fastest lap	Winning driver	Winning team	Secondary class winner	Supporting
1	R1	(Italy) Misano World Circuit	3 May	(Colombia) Salim Hanna	(United States) Sebastian Wheldon	(United States) Sebastian Wheldon	(Italy) Prema Racing	R: (Colombia) Salim Hanna; W: (United Kingdom) Emily Cotty	Formula Regional European Championship; Italian GT Championship; TCR Italy Touring Car Championship; Porsche Carrera Cup Italia
1	R2	(Italy) Misano World Circuit	3 May	(Japan) Kean Nakamura-Berta	(United States) Alex Powell	(Japan) Kean Nakamura-Berta	(Italy) Prema Racing	R: (Colombia) Salim Hanna; W: (United States) Payton Westcott	Formula Regional European Championship; Italian GT Championship; TCR Italy Touring Car Championship; Porsche Carrera Cup Italia
1	R3	(Italy) Misano World Circuit	4 May	(Japan) Kean Nakamura-Berta	(United States) Sebastian Wheldon	(Japan) Kean Nakamura-Berta	(Italy) Prema Racing	R: (Ukraine) Oleksandr Bondarev; W: (Poland) Kornelia Olkucka	Formula Regional European Championship; Italian GT Championship; TCR Italy Touring Car Championship; Porsche Carrera Cup Italia
1	R4	(Italy) Misano World Circuit	4 May	(Japan) Kean Nakamura-Berta	(Japan) Kean Nakamura-Berta	(Japan) Kean Nakamura-Berta	(Italy) Prema Racing	R: (Colombia) Salim Hanna; W: (United Kingdom) Emily Cotty	Formula Regional European Championship; Italian GT Championship; TCR Italy Touring Car Championship; Porsche Carrera Cup Italia
2	R1	(Italy) Vallelunga Circuit	24 May	(Japan) Kean Nakamura-Berta	(Finland) Luka Sammalisto	(Japan) Kean Nakamura-Berta	(Italy) Prema Racing	R: (Colombia) Salim Hanna; W: no finishers	Italian GT Championship; TCR Italy Touring Car Championship
2	R2	(Italy) Vallelunga Circuit	24 May	(Romania) David Cosma Cristofor	(Italy) Emanuele Olivieri	(Japan) Kean Nakamura-Berta	(Italy) Prema Racing	R: (Kyrgyzstan) Artem Severiukhin; W: (United Kingdom) Emily Cotty	Italian GT Championship; TCR Italy Touring Car Championship
2	R3	(Italy) Vallelunga Circuit	25 May	(Romania) David Cosma Cristofor	(United States) Sebastian Wheldon	(United States) Sebastian Wheldon	(Italy) Prema Racing	R: (Norway) Marcus Sæter; W: (United Kingdom) Emily Cotty	Italian GT Championship; TCR Italy Touring Car Championship
2	R4	(Italy) Vallelunga Circuit	25 May	(Japan) Kean Nakamura-Berta	(Brazil) Gabriel Gomez	(Brazil) Gabriel Gomez	(Germany) US Racing	R: (Colombia) Salim Hanna; W: (United Kingdom) Emily Cotty	Italian GT Championship; TCR Italy Touring Car Championship
3	R1	(Italy) Monza Circuit	21 June	(United States) Sebastian Wheldon	(Finland) Luka Sammalisto	(United States) Sebastian Wheldon	(Italy) Prema Racing	R: (Colombia) Salim Hanna; W: (United States) Payton Westcott	TCR World Tour; TCR Italy Touring Car Championship; Italian GT Championship
3	R2	(Italy) Monza Circuit	21 June	(Japan) Kean Nakamura-Berta	(Italy) Maksimilian Popov	(Japan) Kean Nakamura-Berta	(Italy) Prema Racing	R: (Norway) Marcus Sæter; W: (United States) Payton Westcott	TCR World Tour; TCR Italy Touring Car Championship; Italian GT Championship
3	R3	(Italy) Monza Circuit	22 June	(Japan) Kean Nakamura-Berta	(Ukraine) Oleksandr Bondarev	(Italy) Newman Chi	(Italy) Prema Racing	R: (Italy) Newman Chi; W: (United Kingdom) Emily Cotty	TCR World Tour; TCR Italy Touring Car Championship; Italian GT Championship
4	R1	(Italy) Mugello Circuit	12 July	(Japan) Kean Nakamura-Berta	(Italy) Oleksandr Savinkov	(Japan) Kean Nakamura-Berta	(Italy) Prema Racing	R: (Ukraine) Oleksandr Bondarev; W: (United Kingdom) Emily Cotty	Italian GT Championship; Porsche Carrera Cup Italia
4	R2	(Italy) Mugello Circuit	12 July	(United States) Alex Powell	(Singapore) Kabir Anurag	(United States) Alex Powell	(France) R-ace GP	R: (Italy) Newman Chi; W: (United States) Payton Westcott	Italian GT Championship; Porsche Carrera Cup Italia
4	R3	(Italy) Mugello Circuit	13 July	(United States) Alex Powell	(Italy) Emanuele Olivieri	(United States) Alex Powell	(France) R-ace GP	R: (Colombia) Salim Hanna; W: (United States) Payton Westcott	Italian GT Championship; Porsche Carrera Cup Italia
5	R1	(Italy) Imola Circuit	2 August	(Brazil) Gabriel Gomez	(Serbia) Andrija Kostić	(Brazil) Gabriel Gomez	(Germany) US Racing	R: (Colombia) Salim Hanna; W: (United States) Payton Westcott	Formula Regional European Championship; Italian GT Championship; TCR Italy Touring Car Championship
5	R2	(Italy) Imola Circuit	2 August	(Brazil) Gabriel Gomez	race suspended and postponed due to time constraint following a multi-car crash				Formula Regional European Championship; Italian GT Championship; TCR Italy Touring Car Championship
5	R3	(Italy) Imola Circuit	3 August	(Ukraine) Oleksandr Bondarev	(Ukraine) Oleksandr Bondarev	(Ukraine) Oleksandr Bondarev	(Italy) Prema Racing	R: (Ukraine) Oleksandr Bondarev; W: (United Kingdom) Emily Cotty	Formula Regional European Championship; Italian GT Championship; TCR Italy Touring Car Championship
6	R1	(Spain) Circuit de Barcelona-Catalunya	20 September	(Japan) Kean Nakamura-Berta	(Japan) Kean Nakamura-Berta	(Japan) Kean Nakamura-Berta	(Italy) Prema Racing	R: (Colombia) Salim Hanna; W: (United Kingdom) Emily Cotty	International GT Open; Euroformula Open Championship; GT Cup Open Europe; Formula Regional European Championship
6	R2	(Spain) Circuit de Barcelona-Catalunya	21 September	(Italy) Emanuele Olivieri	(Japan) Kean Nakamura-Berta	(Brazil) Gabriel Gomez	(Germany) US Racing	R: (Italy) Newman Chi; W: (United Kingdom) Emily Cotty	International GT Open; Euroformula Open Championship; GT Cup Open Europe; Formula Regional European Championship
6	R3	(Spain) Circuit de Barcelona-Catalunya	21 September	(Italy) Emanuele Olivieri	race suspended and abandoned due to poor visibility and safety concerns				International GT Open; Euroformula Open Championship; GT Cup Open Europe; Formula Regional European Championship
7	R1	(Italy) Misano World Circuit	11 October	(United States) Sebastian Wheldon	(Finland) Luka Sammalisto	(United States) Sebastian Wheldon	(Italy) Prema Racing	R: (Colombia) Salim Hanna; W: (Germany) Mathilda Paatz	TCR Italy Touring Car Championship; Porsche Carrera Cup Italia
7	R2	(Italy) Misano World Circuit	11 October	(Brazil) Gabriel Gomez	(United States) Sebastian Wheldon	(United States) Sebastian Wheldon	(Italy) Prema Racing	R: (Italy) Newman Chi; W: (United Kingdom) Emily Cotty	TCR Italy Touring Car Championship; Porsche Carrera Cup Italia
7	R3	(Italy) Misano World Circuit	11 October	(Brazil) Gabriel Gomez	(Brazil) Gabriel Gomez	(Brazil) Gabriel Gomez	(Germany) US Racing	R: (Colombia) Salim Hanna; W: (Poland) Kornelia Olkucka	TCR Italy Touring Car Championship; Porsche Carrera Cup Italia
7	R4	(Italy) Misano World Circuit	12 October	(United States) Sebastian Wheldon	(United States) Sebastian Wheldon	(United States) Sebastian Wheldon	(Italy) Prema Racing	R: (Italy) Newman Chi; W: no participants	TCR Italy Touring Car Championship; Porsche Carrera Cup Italia
7	R5	(Italy) Misano World Circuit	12 October	(Brazil) Gabriel Gomez	(Kyrgyzstan) Kirill Kutskov	(Japan) Kean Nakamura-Berta	(Italy) Prema Racing	R: (Ukraine) Oleksandr Bondarev; W: (United Kingdom) Emily Cotty	TCR Italy Touring Car Championship; Porsche Carrera Cup Italia

== Championship standings ==
Points are awarded to the top 10 classified finishers in each race. No points are awarded for pole position or fastest lap. The final classifications for the individual standings is obtained by summing up the scores on the 16 best results obtained during the races held.

Position	**1st**	**2nd**	**3rd**	**4th**	**5th**	**6th**	**7th**	**8th**	**9th**	**10th**
Points	25	18	15	12	10	8	6	4	2	1

=== Drivers' championship ===
Pos	Driver	MIS1 (Italy)				VLL (Italy)				MNZ (Italy)			MUG (Italy)			IMO (Italy)			CAT (Spain)			MIS2 (Italy)					Pts
Pos	Driver	R1	R2	R3	R4	R1	R2	R3	R4	R1	R2	R3	R1	R2	R3	R1	R2	R3	R1	R2	R3	R1	R2	R3	R4	R5	Pts
1	(Japan) Kean Nakamura-Berta		**1**	**1**	**1**	**1**	1		**11**	3	**1**	**16**	**1**	6	3	3	C	2	**1**	2	C	2	3		2	1	342
2	(Brazil) Gabriel Gomez	3	6		35	3	3		1	2	2	Ret	2	5	4	**1**	**C**	4	Ret	1	C		**Ret**	**1**	6	**2**	267
3	(United States) Sebastian Wheldon	1		2	5		2	1	25	**1**	3	28	7	4	14	10	C	11	6	4	C	**1**	1		**1**	7	256
4	(Colombia) Salim Hanna	**2**	4		3	5	13		3	4	Ret	30	11	16	7	2	C	5	2	8	C	5		2	7	6	180
5	(Italy) Newman Chi	5		7	9	9	9		28	28	17	1	9	2	8	6	C	3	4	7	C		2	5	4	4	162
6	(Italy) Maksimilian Popov		2	4	2		6	3	22	17	29	15	12	26	5	11	C	6	11	3	C	3	5		5	8	143
7	(Italy) Emanuele Olivieri		3	3	4		5	20	2	9	34†	5	4	11	30	8	C	21	3	**5**	**C**		7	22	10	5	140
8	(Finland) Luka Sammalisto	7	Ret		28	22†		11	9	5	4	2	5	7	6	22	C	29†	5	6	C	4		3	3	22	132
9	(United States) Alex Powell		11	8	11		7	2	4	16	6	18	3	**1**	**1**	7	C	7	10	12	C	12	14		16	11	126
10	(Ukraine) Oleksandr Bondarev	22		6	8	17		10	12	33†	Ret	Ret	8	17	26	4	C	**1**	14	14	C	6		4	29	3	89
11	(Latvia) Tomass Štolcermanis	4	5		6	2	4		Ret																		60
12	(Netherlands) Reno Francot												18	3	2	5	C	22				25		9	13	9	47
13	(Kyrgyzstan) Artem Severiukhin	9	8		13	6	8		7	27	35†	6	17	35†	11	15	C	13	8	15	C	29	10		17	10	38
14	(United Kingdom) Bart Harrison		9	13	10	Ret		8	6	Ret	33†	3	19	15	21	30	C	27†	22	21	C		23	7	31	12	36
15	(Norway) Marcus Sæter		13	15	18	7		4	5	13	7	21	23	24	12	25	C	14	18	Ret	C	28		10	22	23	35
16	(Singapore) Kabir Anurag		7	5	7	Ret	18		31	8	32†	Ret	10	9	15	21	C	8	9	17	C		11	Ret	14	29†	35
17	(Serbia) Andrija Kostić	8		10	14	15	12		Ret	7	5	8	Ret	8	13	28	C	26	Ret	18	C		19	8	11	24	33
18	(Kyrgyzstan) Kirill Kutskov		18	19	23	10		6	13	24	13	17	16	18	19	17	C	25	29	26	C	8	4		8	30†	29
19	(Germany) Maxim Rehm	10		9	15	4		Ret	18	Ret	9	13	6	14	22	9	C	30†									27
20	(Switzerland) Enea Frey	6	10		12	8	Ret		17	Ret	8	7	13	23	31	27	C	9									25
21	(Australia) Dante Vinci	12		11	16		10	19	Ret	6	Ret	34†	15	10	10	13	C	28†	7	13	C	7		14	30	25	23
22	(Italy) Andrea Dupé	14		23	DNS	12		21	30	Ret	21	Ret	35†	WD	WD	14	C	Ret	21	9	C		6	6	9	31†	20
23	(Poland) Aleksander Ruta	23		12	31	18		7	8	Ret	11	33†	31	20	9	21	C	Ret	12	10	C	9	9		20	13	17
24	(Romania) Luca Viișoreanu	21	Ret		DNQ		17	9	21	12	14	4	33†	Ret	18	16	C	17	32†	35†	C						14
25	(Argentina) Teo Schropp	24		14	30	11		5	10	15	36†	19	22	21	24	31	C	10	15	16	C	10		21	33†	28	13
26	(Romania) David Cosma Cristofor		14	22	22		**11**	**14**	14	10	12	9	32	33	16	12	C	23	19	19	C	11	8		12	17	7
27	(Italy) Oleksandr Savinkov	16	12		17		14	24†	26	14	10	Ret	34†	12	20	23	C	15					18	18	Ret	14	1
28	(Mexico) Javier Herrera									29	19	10				Ret	C	WD									1
29	(Qatar) Bader Al Sulaiti	13	16		21	21		12	29	11	27	11	25	19	23	20	C	24	13	20	C		13	13	Ret	16	0
30	(Italy) Francesco Coppola	11		17	33		21	17	19	Ret	16	12	26	29	27	29	C	WD				22	17		25	Ret	0
31	(United Kingdom) Emily Cotty	17	Ret		24		16	18	27	23	30	24	21	34†	WD	33†	C	19	23	11	C	20	21		DNQ	20	0
32	(France) Andy Consani																		Ret	31	C		28	11	15		0
33	(Denmark) David Walther	25	Ret		DNQ	13	Ret		15	19	18	32	14	13	33	18	C	Ret	27	23	C		16	12	23	15	0
34	(Czech Republic) Jan Koller		15	25	20		15	13	Ret	20	Ret	26							Ret	22	C		12	19	27		0
35	(Germany) Elia Weiss	26	17		32		25	15	16	Ret	28	Ret	20	Ret	WD	Ret	C	12	20	30	C	14		20	19	27	0
36	(Italy) Ludovico Busso	15		16	19	20	19		23	18	24	14	24	25	28	Ret	C	WD	16	24	C	13		15	21	WD	0
37	(Israel) Guy Albag	18	21		34	14		Ret	20	25	20	29	Ret	22	17	Ret	C	18	17	32	C	16		17	26	19	0
38	(Germany) Phil Colin Strenge	19	23		27		20	16	24	21	15	22	27	30	32	24	C	16	28	34	C	21		26	DNQ	18	0
39	(India) Ary Bansal																						15	27	18		0
40	(Italy) Niccolò Maccagnani																					15		25	32		0
41	(Mexico) Nicolás Cortés																						20	16	28		0
42	(France) Arthur Lorimier		DNS	24	DNQ	16	23		32	26	31	31	29	28	35	Ret	C	WD									0
43	(Italy) Oscar Repetto																					17		28	Ret		0
44	(Switzerland) Nathanaël Berreby		19	18	29	Ret	24		DNQ	32	25	20	DNS	32	25	32	C	WD	30	33	C	24	24		DNQ	Ret	0
45	(Switzerland) Florentin Hattemer																					18	Ret		24		0
46	(Turkey) Emir Tanju	20		20	25	19		Ret	DNQ																		0
47	(Germany) Mathilda Paatz																		24	25	C	19	22		DNQ		0
48	(United States) Payton Westcott		20	Ret	26		22	23	DNQ	22	22	25	28	27	29	26	C	20	25	27	C	23	25		DNQ	21	0
49	(Romania) Andrei Dună		22	21	DNQ																						0
50	(Poland) Kornelia Olkucka	27		26	DNQ	Ret		22	DNQ	30	26	27	30	31	34	Ret	C	Ret	31	29	C		27	24	DNQ	26	0
51	(United States) Andre Rodriguez									31	23	23							26	28	C	27	26		DNQ		0
52	(Italy) Antonio Errigo																					26		23	DNQ		0
Pos	Driver	R1	R2	R3	R4	R1	R2	R3	R4	R1	R2	R3	R1	R2	R3	R1	R2	R3	R1	R2	R3	R1	R2	R3	R4	R5	Pts
Pos	Driver	MIS1 (Italy)				VLL (Italy)				MNZ (Italy)			MUG (Italy)			IMO (Italy)			CAT (Spain)			MIS2 (Italy)					Pts

Colour	Result
Gold	Winner
Silver	Second place
Bronze	Third place
Green	Points classification
Blue	Non-points classification
Blue	Non-classified finish (NC)
Purple	Retired, not classified (Ret)
Red	Did not qualify (DNQ)
Red	Did not pre-qualify (DNPQ)
Black	Disqualified (DSQ)
White	Did not start (DNS)
White	Withdrew (WD)
White	Race cancelled (C)
Blank	Did not practice (DNP)
Blank	Did not arrive (DNA)
Blank	Excluded (EX)

**Bold** – Pole
Italics – Fastest Lap
† — Did not finish, but classified

=== Secondary classes standings ===
Pos	Driver	MIS1 (Italy)				VLL (Italy)				MNZ (Italy)			MUG (Italy)			IMO (Italy)			CAT (Spain)			MIS2 (Italy)					Pts
Pos	Driver	R1	R2	R3	R4	R1	R2	R3	R4	R1	R2	R3	R1	R2	R3	R1	R2	R3	R1	R2	R3	R1	R2	R3	R4	R5	Pts
Rookies' championship
1	(Colombia) Salim Hanna	1	1		1	1	5		1	1	Ret	14	3	4	1	1	C	3	1	2	C	1		1	2	3	356
2	(Italy) Newman Chi	2		2	3	4	2		13	14	5	1	2	1	2	3	C	2	2	1	C		1	3	1	2	314
3	(Ukraine) Oleksandr Bondarev	11		1	2	9		3	5	18†	Ret	Ret	1	5	10	2	C	1	7	7	C	2		2	15	1	222
4	(Kyrgyzstan) Artem Severiukhin	3	2		4	2	1		3	13	18†	2	6	17†	5	7	C	5	4	8	C	18	5		6	4	201
5	(Norway) Marcus Sæter		3	5	6	3		1	2	5	1	7	9	9	6	12	C	6	10	Ret	C	17		5	10	13	164
6	(Australia) Dante Vinci	4		3	5		3	9	Ret	2	Ret	18†	5	2	4	5	C	13†	3	6	C	3		9	16	14	162
7	(Romania) David Cosma Cristofor		4	7	9		4	5	6	3	3	3	17	15	7	4	C	11	11	9	C	5	3		4	8	156
8	(Poland) Aleksander Ruta	12		4	13	10		2	4	Ret	2	17†	16	7	3	9	C	Ret	5	4	C	4	4		8	5	144
9	(Qatar) Bader Al Sulaiti	5	5		8	12		4	14	4	14	5	11	6	9	10	C	12	6	10	C		6	8	Ret	7	96
10	(Italy) Andrea Dupé	6		8	DNS	5		10	15	Ret	9	Ret	18†	WD	WD	6	C	Ret	13	3	C		2	4	3	17†	93
11	(Denmark) David Walther	13	Ret		DNQ	6	Ret		7	7	6	16	4	3	14	8	C	Ret	17	11	C		7	7	11	6	79
12	(Italy) Ludovico Busso	7		6	7	11	7		10	6	12	6	10	10	11	Ret	C	WD	8	12	C	6		10	9	WD	60
13	(Germany) Elia Weiss	14	6		14		11	6	8	Ret	15	Ret	7	Ret	WD	Ret	C	4	12	16	C	7		13	7	16	50
14	(Germany) Phil Colin Strenge	10	9		12		8	7	11	8	4	8	12	13	13	11	C	7	18	19	C	13		17	DNQ	9	41
15	(United Kingdom) Emily Cotty	8	Ret		10		6	8	12	10	16	10	8	16†	WD	14†	C	9	14	5	C	12	9		DNQ	11	37
16	(Israel) Guy Albag	9	8		15	7		Ret	9	11	8	13	Ret	8	8	Ret	C	8	9	18	C	9		12	13	10	35
17	(Mexico) Javier Herrera									15	7	4				Ret	C	WD									18
18	(France) Andy Consani																		Ret	17	C		13	6	5		18
19	(United States) Payton Westcott		7	Ret	11		9	12	DNQ	9	10	11	13	11	12	13	C	10	15	13	C	14	10		DNQ	12	13
20	(France) Arthur Lorimier		DNS	9	DNQ	8	10		16	12	17	15	14	12	16	Ret	C	WD									7
21	(Mexico) Nicolás Cortés																						8	11	14		4
22	(Italy) Niccolò Maccagnani																					8		16	17		4
23	(United States) Andre Rodriguez									17	11	9							16	14	C	16	11		DNQ		2
24	(Poland) Kornelia Olkucka	15		10	DNQ	Ret		11	DNQ	16	13	12	15	14	15	Ret	C	Ret	19	15	C		12	15	DNQ	15	1
25	(Italy) Oscar Repetto																					10		18	Ret		1
26	(Switzerland) Florentin Hattemer																					11	Ret		12		0
27	(Italy) Antonio Errigo																					15		14	DNQ		0
Women's championship
1	(United Kingdom) Emily Cotty	1	Ret		1		1	1	1	2	3	1	1	3†	WD	2†	C	1	1	1	C	2	1		DNQ	1	369
2	(United States) Payton Westcott		1	Ret	2		2	3	DNQ	1	1	2	2	1	1	1	C	2	3	3	C	3	3		DNQ	2	318
3	(Poland) Kornelia Olkucka	2		1	DNQ	Ret		2	DNQ	3	2	3	3	2	2	Ret	C	Ret	4	4	C		4	1	DNQ	3	236
4	(Germany) Mathilda Paatz																		2	2	C	1	2		DNQ		79
Pos	Driver	R1	R2	R3	R4	R1	R2	R3	R4	R1	R2	R3	R1	R2	R3	R1	R2	R3	R1	R2	R3	R1	R2	R3	R4	R5	Pts
Pos	Driver	MIS1 (Italy)				VLL (Italy)				MNZ (Italy)			MUG (Italy)			IMO (Italy)			CAT (Spain)			MIS2 (Italy)					Pts

=== Teams' championship ===
Each team acquired the points earned by their two best drivers in each race.

Pos	Team	MIS1 (Italy)				VLL (Italy)				MNZ (Italy)			MUG (Italy)			IMO (Italy)			CAT (Spain)			MIS2 (Italy)					Pts
Pos	Team	R1	R2	R3	R4	R1	R2	R3	R4	R1	R2	R3	R1	R2	R3	R1	R2	R3	R1	R2	R3	R1	R2	R3	R4	R5	Pts
1	(Italy) Prema Racing	1	1	1	1	1	1	1	3	1	1	1	1	2	3	2	C	1	1	2	C	1	1	2	1	1	825
1	(Italy) Prema Racing	2	4	2	3	2	2	10	11	3	3	16	7	4	7	3	C	2	2	4	C	2	2	4	2	3	825
2	(Germany) US Racing	3	6	5	7	3	3	11	1	2	2	2	2	5	4	1	C	4	5	1	C	4	11	1	3	2	447
2	(Germany) US Racing	7	7	9	14	4	12	13	9	5	4	8	5	7	6	9	C	8	9	6	C	13	12	3	6	22	447
3	(France) R-ace GP	16	3	3	4	14	5	2	2	9	6	5	3	1	1	7	C	7	3	5	C	12	7	11	10	5	267
3	(France) R-ace GP	17	11	8	11		7	18	4	14	10	18	4	11	17	8	C	15	10	11	C	16	14	17	15	11	267
4	(Netherlands) Van Amersfoort Racing	12	2	4	2	7	6	3	5	6	7	15	12	10	5	11	C	6	7	3	C	3	5	10	5	8	209
4	(Netherlands) Van Amersfoort Racing	23	13	11	16	18	10	4	8	13	11	21	15	20	9	13	C	14	11	10	C	7	9	14	20	13	209
5	(Switzerland) Jenzer Motorsport	6	8	13	10	6	8	5	6	11	8	3	13	15	11	15	C	9	8	15	C	10	10	7	17	10	104
5	(Switzerland) Jenzer Motorsport	9	9	14	12	8	Ret	8	7	15	19	6	17	19	21	20	C	10	13	16	C	18	13	13	24	12	104
6	(Germany) PHM Racing	14	14	22	22	12	11	14	14	10	12	9	18	3	2	5	C	22	19	19	C	11	8	9	12	9	54
6	(Germany) PHM Racing			23	DNS			21	30	Ret	21	Ret	32	33	16	12	C	23				25			13	17	54
7	(Switzerland) Maffi Racing	25	18	18	23	10	24	6	13	19	13	17	14	13	19	17	C	25	27	23	C	8	4	12	8	15	29
7	(Switzerland) Maffi Racing	27	19	19	29	13	Ret	22	15	24	18	20	16	18	25	18	C	Ret	29	26	C	24	16	24	23	26	29
8	(Romania) Real Racing	21	22	21	DNQ		17	9	21	12	14	4	33†	Ret	18	16	C	17									14
8	(Romania) Real Racing		Ret		DNQ																						14
9	(Italy) Technorace	11		17	33		21	17	19	Ret	16	12	26	29	27	29	C	WD				22	17	23	25	Ret	0
9	(Italy) Technorace																					26			DNQ		0
10	(Italy) Cram Motorsport	26	17		32		25	15	16	31	23	23	20	Ret	WD	Ret	C	12	20	28	C	14	26	20	19	27	0
10	(Italy) Cram Motorsport									Ret	28	Ret							26	30	C	17		28	Ret		0
11	(Italy) Viola Formula Racing	15	DNS	16	19	16	19	Ret	23	18	24	14	24	25	28	Ret	C	WD									0
11	(Italy) Viola Formula Racing	20		20	25	19	23		32	26	31	31	29	28	35	Ret	C	WD									0
12	(Slovenia) AS Motorsport	20	23		27		20	16	24	21	15	22	27	30	32	24	C	16	24	25	C	19	22	26	DNQ	18	0
12	(Slovenia) AS Motorsport																		28	34	C	21			DNQ		0
13	(Italy) BVM Racing																					15		25	32		0
Pos	Team	R1	R2	R3	R4	R1	R2	R3	R4	R1	R2	R3	R1	R2	R3	R1	R2	R3	R1	R2	R3	R1	R2	R3	R4	R5	Pts
Pos	Team	MIS1 (Italy)				VLL (Italy)				MNZ (Italy)			MUG (Italy)			IMO (Italy)			CAT (Spain)			MIS2 (Italy)					Pts

Colour	Result
Gold	Winner
Silver	Second place
Bronze	Third place
Green	Points classification
Blue	Non-points classification
Blue	Non-classified finish (NC)
Purple	Retired, not classified (Ret)
Red	Did not qualify (DNQ)
Red	Did not pre-qualify (DNPQ)
Black	Disqualified (DSQ)
White	Did not start (DNS)
White	Withdrew (WD)
White	Race cancelled (C)
Blank	Did not practice (DNP)
Blank	Did not arrive (DNA)
Blank	Excluded (EX)

**Bold** – Pole
Italics – Fastest Lap
† — Did not finish, but classified

== See also ==
- 2025 E4 Championship
