= Payton Westcott =

American racing driver (born 2009)

- Westcott at the 2026 Dutch Grand Prix
- Nationality: (United States) American
- Born: Payton Riley Westcott; 20 March 2009 (age 17) Laguna Beach, California, USA

F1 Academy career
- Debut season: 2025
- Current team: Prema Racing
- Car number: 9
- Former teams: Hitech TGR
- Starts: 14
- Wins: 1
- Podiums: 4
- Poles: 0
- Fastest laps: 2
- Best finish: 18th in 2025

Previous series
- 2025; 2025; 2025; 2025: Formula Winter Series; E4; Formula Trophy; F4 Saudi Arabian
- Statistics up to date as of 13 November 2026.

Payton Riley Westcott (born 20 March 2009) is an American racing driver who competes in F1 Academy for Prema Racing with support from Mercedes.

== Career ==
=== Karting ===
Westcott began karting at the age of 12, competing until 2024. Mainly racing in the US in her karting career, Westcott made her international debut in 2024, racing in the Champions of the Future Academy Program as part of F1 Academy's Discover Your Drive initiative.

=== Formula 4 (2025–) ===
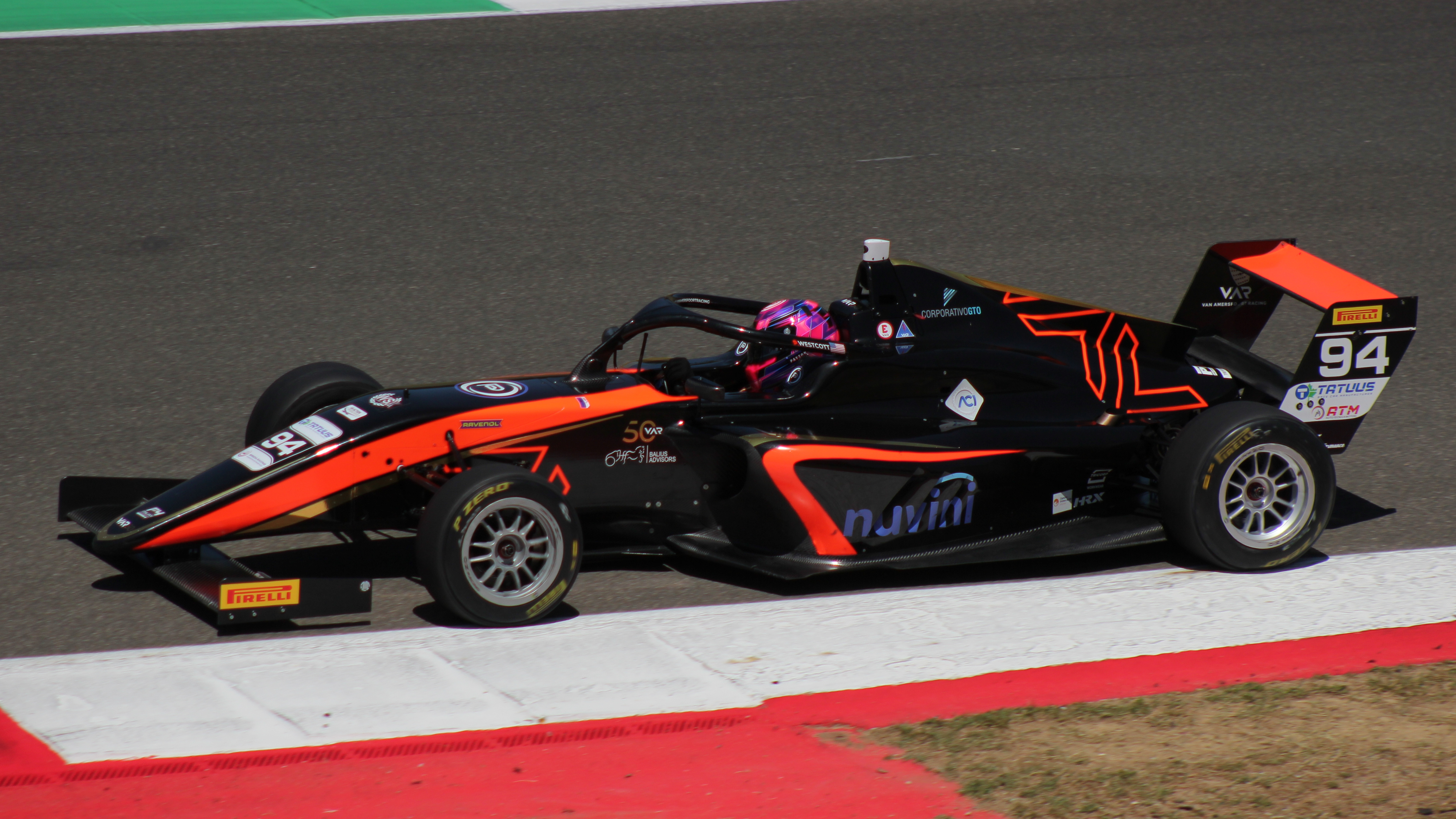
Westcott driving at the Mugello Circuit during the 2025 Italian F4 Championship

Stepping up to single-seaters in 2025, Westcott began the year in Formula Winter Series with Van Amersfoort Racing, scoring a best result of 13th in race three at Aragón to end the winter 27th in points. For her main campaign, Westcott took part in the Italian F4 Championship, also with Van Amersfoort Racing. During the first race of the season in Misano, she finished in 20th and claimed her first win in the women's' championship. Westcott advanced on Emily Cotty in the women's championship throughout the season, securing double class wins at both Monza and Mugello. At Imola, Westcott achieved a class win during race one and tied her highest finishing position of 20th during race three. By the end of the season, she finished the women's championship in second. Westcott also participated in the E4 Championship, once again with VAR.

At the end of 2025, Westcott raced in the first and last rounds of Formula Trophy with Prema Racing, winning race two at Dubai from reverse-grid pole, becoming the first female race winner in the series, before returning for the season-ending round at Yas Marina and finishing tenth in race one, helping her end the year tenth in points. Also in 2025, Westcott made a one-off appearance in the F4 Saudi Arabian Championship in the season-ending Jeddah round, in which she scored a best result of eighth in race two.

At the beginning of the following year, Westcott remained with Prema to compete in the first three rounds of the UAE4 Series, in which she scored a best result of eighth in race two at Dubai. Alongside her rookie F1 Academy campaign, Westcott returned to Italian F4 with R-ace GP, where she took a best overall result of tenth at Mugello and two other points finishes to end the season 39th in points. During 2026, Westcott also made cameo appearances in the Formula 4 CEZ Championship for Cram Motorsport and the E4 Championship with R-ace, qualifying ninth on her series return in the latter at Monza.

=== F1 Academy ===
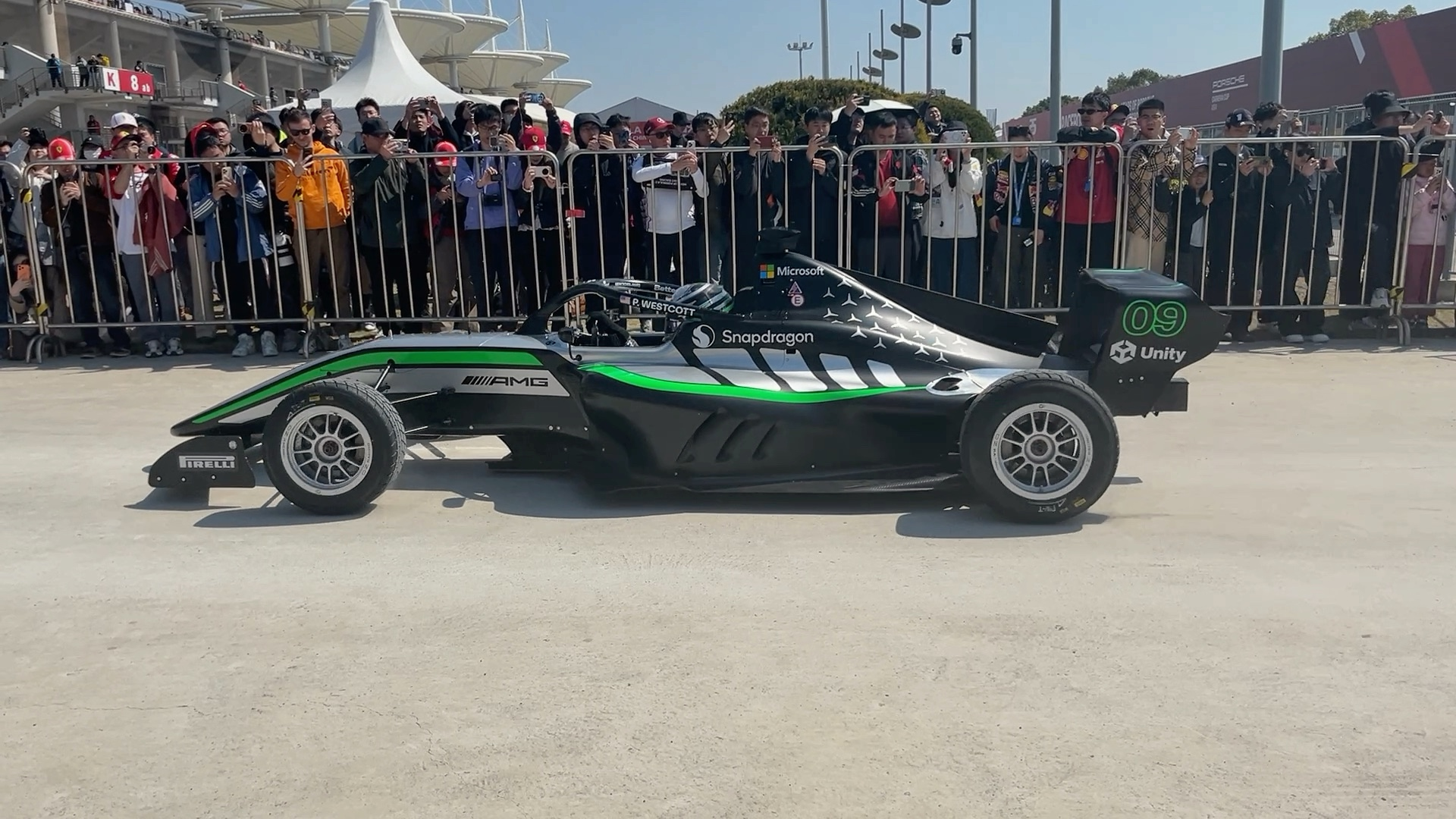
Westcott driving at the 2026 F1 Academy Shanghai round

During her maiden campaign in Italian F4, Westcott participated in the F1 Academy rookie test at Navarra, where she placed third in the morning session and 1st in the afternoon session. She was then selected as the wildcard driver for the final round of the 2025 F1 Academy season in Las Vegas. She scored points in her debut race by finishing sixth, before retiring in race two after a crash with Joanne Ciconte.

Westcott made her full-season debut in the 2026 season with Prema Racing, succeeding 2025 title champion Doriane Pin as the Mercedes-backed driver.

== Karting record ==
=== Karting career summary ===
Season	Series	Team	Position
2022	California ProKart Challenge – KA 100 Jr.		7th
2022	SKUSA SuperNationals – KA 100 Jr.	Nash Motorsportz	28th
2023	USPKS – KA 100 Jr.		6th
2023	USPKS – X30 Junior		32nd
2023	SKUSA SuperNationals – KA 100 Jr.	Nash Motorsportz	18th
2023	SKUSA SuperNationals – X30 Junior	Nash Motorsportz	30th
2024	USPKS – KA 100 Jr.	Rolison Performance Group	11th
2024	USPKS – X30 Junior	Rolison Performance Group	33rd
2024	Champions of the Future Academy Program – OK-N		35th

== Racing record ==
=== Racing career summary ===
Season	Series	Team	Races	Wins	Poles	F/Laps	Podiums	Points	Position
2025	Formula Winter Series	Van Amersfoort Racing	12	0	0	0	0	0	27th
2025	Italian F4 Championship	Van Amersfoort Racing	20	0	0	0	0	0	48th
2025	E4 Championship	Van Amersfoort Racing	9	0	0	0	0	0	35th
2025	F1 Academy	Hitech TGR	2	0	0	0	0	3	18th
2025	Formula Trophy	Mumbai Falcons Racing Limited	5	1	0	0	1	30	10th
2025	F4 Saudi Arabian Championship	Zahid	2	0	0	0	0	4	17th
2026	UAE4 Series	Prema Racing	9	0	0	0	0	6	21st
2026	F1 Academy	Prema Racing	14	1	0	2	4	82	5th
2026	Italian F4 Championship	R-ace GP	17	0	0	0	0	11	39th
2026	Formula 4 CEZ Championship	Cram Motorsport	2	0	0	0	0	12	35th
2026	E4 Championship	R-ace GP	3	0	0	0	0	0	42nd

* Season still in progress.

=== Complete Formula Winter Series results ===
(key) (Races in bold indicate pole position) (Races in italics indicate fastest lap)

Year	Team	1	2	3	4	5	6	7	8	9	10	11	12	DC	Points
2025	Van Amersfoort Racing	POR; 1; 17	POR; 2; 17	POR; 3; 23	CRT; 1; 19	CRT; 2; 24	CRT; 3; 17	ARA; 1; 15	ARA; 2 Ret	ARA; 3; 13	CAT; 1; 19	CAT; 2; 23	CAT; 3; 25	27th	0

=== Complete Italian F4 Championship results ===
(key) (Races in bold indicate pole position; races in italics indicate fastest lap)

Year	Team	1	2	3	4	5	6	7	8	9	10	11	12	13	14	15	16	17	18	19	20	21	22	23	24	25	26	27	28	DC	Points
2025	Van Amersfoort Racing	MIS1; 1	MIS1; 2; 20	MIS1; 3 Ret	MIS1; 4; 26	VLL; 1	VLL; 2; 22	VLL; 3; 23	VLL; 4 DNQ	MNZ; 1; 22	MNZ; 2; 22	MNZ; 3; 25	MUG; 1; 28	MUG; 2; 27	MUG; 3; 29	IMO; 1; 26	IMO; 2 C	IMO; 3; 20	CAT; 1; 25	CAT; 2; 27	CAT; 3 C	MIS2; 1	MIS2; 2; 27	MIS2; 3; 24	MIS2; 4 DNQ	MIS2; 5; 26				48th	0
2026	R-ace GP	MIS1; 1; 17	MIS1; 2; 16	MIS1; 3	MIS1; 4; 21	VLL; 1	VLL; 2	VLL; 3	VLL; 4	MNZ; 1; 26	MNZ; 2	MNZ; 3; 15	MNZ; 4; 26	MUG1; 1; 20	MUG1; 2; 23	MUG1; 3	MUG1; 4 DNQ	IMO; 1; 18	IMO; 2; 21	IMO; 3	IMO; 4; 21	MIS2; 1	MIS2; 2; 18	MIS2; 3; 18	MIS2; 4 Ret	MUG2; 1; 15	MUG2; 2	MUG2; 3; 10	MUG2; 4; 22	39th	11

=== Complete E4 Championship results ===
(key) (Races in bold indicate pole position; races in italics indicate fastest lap)

Year	Team	1	2	3	4	5	6	7	8	9	DC	Points
2025	Van Amersfoort Racing	LEC; 1; 21	LEC; 2; 22	LEC; 3; 16	MUG; 1 Ret	MUG; 2; 28	MUG; 3 Ret	MNZ; 1 Ret	MNZ; 2; 16	MNZ; 3; 19	35th	0
2026	R-ace GP	VLL; 1	VLL; 2	VLL; 3	LEC; 1	LEC; 2	LEC; 3	MNZ; 1; 20	MNZ; 2 Ret	MNZ; 3; 22	42nd	0

=== Complete F1 Academy results ===
(key) (Races in bold indicate pole position) (Races in italics indicate fastest lap)

Year	Entrant	1	2	3	4	5	6	7	8	9	10	11	12	13	14	15	DC	Points
2025	Hitech TGR	SHA; 1	SHA; 2	JED; 1	JED; 2	MIA; 1	MIA; 2	MTL; 1	MTL; 2	MTL; 3	ZAN; 1	ZAN; 2	SIN; 1	SIN; 2	LVG; 1; 6	LVG; 2 Ret	18th	3
2026	Prema Racing	SHA; 1; 6	SHA; 2; 3	MTL; 1; 16	MTL; 2; 3	MTL; 3; 4	SIL; 1; 14	SIL; 2; 11	ZAN; 1; 1	ZAN; 2; 9	COA; 1; 7	COA; 2; 6	COA; 3; 2	LVG; 1	LVG; 2		4th*	47*

* Season still in progress.

=== Complete Formula Trophy results ===
(key) (Races in bold indicate pole position; races in italics indicate fastest lap)

Year	Team	1	2	3	4	5	6	7	DC	Points
2025	Mumbai Falcons Racing Limited	DUB; 1; 8	DUB; 2; 1	DUB; 3; 14	YMC1; 1	YMC1; 2	YMC2; 1; 10	YMC2; 2 Ret	10th	30

=== Complete F4 Saudi Arabian Championship results ===
(key) (Races in bold indicate pole position) (Races in italics indicate fastest lap)

Year	Team	1	2	3	4	5	6	7	8	9	10	DC	Points
2025	Zahid	BHR1; 1	BHR1; 2	BHR2; 1	BHR2; 2	JED1; 1	JED1; 2	JED2; 1	JED2; 2	JED3; 1; 11	JED3; 2; 8	17th	4

=== Complete UAE4 Series results ===
(key) (Races in bold indicate pole position; races in italics indicate fastest lap)

Year	Team	1	2	3	4	5	6	7	8	9	10	11	12	DC	Points
2026	Prema Racing	YMC1; 1; 16	YMC1; 2 Ret	YMC1; 3; 22	YMC2; 1; 22	YMC2; 2; 21	YMC2; 3; 23	DUB; 1; 9	DUB; 2; 8	DUB; 3; 20	LUS; 1	LUS; 2	LUS; 3	21st	6

=== Complete Formula 4 CEZ Championship results ===
(key) (Races in bold indicate pole position) (Races in italics indicate fastest lap)

Year	Team	1	2	3	4	5	6	7	8	9	10	11	12	13	14	15	16	17	18	19	20	21	22	23	24	DC	Points
2026	Cram Motorsport	RBR1; 1	RBR1; 2	RBR1; 3	RBR1; 4	SAL; 1; 12	SAL; 2; 8	SAL; 3	SAL; 4 C	SVK; 1	SVK; 2	SVK; 3	SVK; 4	MOS; 1	MOS; 2	MOS; 3	MOS; 4	BRN; 1	BRN; 2	BRN; 3	BRN; 4	HUN; 1	HUN; 2	HUN; 3	HUN; 4	35th	12
