= 2019 X1 Racing League =

Motor racing championship

The 2019 X1 Racing League was the inaugural season of the X1 Racing League, a professional franchise-based motorsport series in India. The league began in November 2019 with six teams.

== Teams and drivers ==
Team	Driver
(India) AD Racing Delhi	(India) Gaurav Gill
(India) AD Racing Delhi	(Austria) Mathias Lauda
(India) AD Racing Delhi	(Denmark) Christina Nielsen
(India) AD Racing Delhi	(India) Raghul Rangasamy
(India) AD Racing Delhi	(India) Ashwin Datta
(India) NK Racing Chennai	(India) Narain Karthikeyan
(India) NK Racing Chennai	(China) Congfu Cheng
(India) NK Racing Chennai	(United Kingdom) Alice Powell
(India) NK Racing Chennai	(India) Arjun Balu
(India) NK Racing Chennai	(India) Yash Aradhya
(India) Bangalore Racing Stars	(India) Arjun Maini
(India) Bangalore Racing Stars	(United Kingdom) Oliver Webb
(India) Bangalore Racing Stars	(Denmark) Michelle Gatting
(India) Bangalore Racing Stars	(India) Nayan Chatterjee
(India) Bangalore Racing Stars	(India) Vishnu Prasad
(India) Mumbai Falcons	(India) Kush Maini
(India) Mumbai Falcons	(Denmark) Mikkel Jensen
(India) Mumbai Falcons	(United Kingdom) Pippa Mann
(India) Mumbai Falcons	(India) Karthik Tharani
(India) Mumbai Falcons	(India) Sohil Shah
(India) Black Birds Hyderabad	(India) Akhil Rabindra
(India) Black Birds Hyderabad	(Italy) Vitantonio Liuzzi
(India) Black Birds Hyderabad	(Poland) Gosia Rdest
(India) Black Birds Hyderabad	(India) Anindith Reddy
(India) Black Birds Hyderabad	(India) Arjun Narendran
(India) DG Racing Ahmedabad	(India) Krishnaraaj Mahadik
(India) DG Racing Ahmedabad	(Malaysia) Alex Yoong
(India) DG Racing Ahmedabad	(Switzerland) Rahel Frey
(India) DG Racing Ahmedabad	(India) Ameya Walavalkar
(India) DG Racing Ahmedabad	(India) Chittesh Mandody

== Calendar and results ==
Round	Circuit	Dates	Winning drivers	Winning team	Ref
1	Buddh International Circuit	30 November – 1 December	(India) Arjun Maini (United Kingdom) Oliver Webb	Bangalore Racing Stars	
1	Buddh International Circuit	30 November – 1 December	(India) Arjun Maini (United Kingdom) Oliver Webb	Bangalore Racing Stars	
1	Buddh International Circuit	30 November – 1 December	(Denmark) Mikkel Jensen (India) Kush Maini	Mumbai Falcons	
2	Madras Motor Race Track	7–8 December	(India) Arjun Maini (United Kingdom) Oliver Webb	Bangalore Racing Stars	
2	Madras Motor Race Track	7–8 December	(Denmark) Mikkel Jensen (India) Kush Maini	Mumbai Falcons	
2	Madras Motor Race Track	7–8 December	(Denmark) Mikkel Jensen (India) Kush Maini	Mumbai Falcons	
