= Mumbai Falcons =

Indian motorsports team

(India) Mumbai Falcons
- Founded: 2019
- Base: Pune, Maharashtra, India
- Team principal(s): Ameet Gadhoke, Arianna Gadhoke
- Current series: Formula Regional Middle East Championship; UAE4 Series
- Former series: F3 Asian Championship; Formula Regional Asian Championship; X1 Racing League; Formula 4 UAE Championship; F4 Middle East Championship
- Current drivers: Formula Regional Middle East Championship (United Kingdom) 8. Reza Seewooruthun (United Arab Emirates) 14. Rashid Al Dhaheri (United Kingdom) 27. Freddie Slater (Australia) 45. Jack Beeton; F4 Middle East Championship (India) 7. Arjun Chheda (Latvia) 33. Tomass Štolcermanis (United Kingdom) 51. Kean Nakamura-Berta (Colombia) 88. Salim Hanna
- Teams' Championships: Formula Regional Asian Championship: 2022; Formula Regional Middle East Championship: 2023; Formula 4 UAE Championship: 2023, 2024
- Drivers' Championships: Formula Regional Asian Championship: 2022: Arthur Leclerc; Formula Regional Middle East Championship: 2023: Andrea Kimi Antonelli; Formula 4 UAE Championship: 2023: James Wharton; 2024: Freddie Slater
- Website: https://www.mumbaifalcons.net/

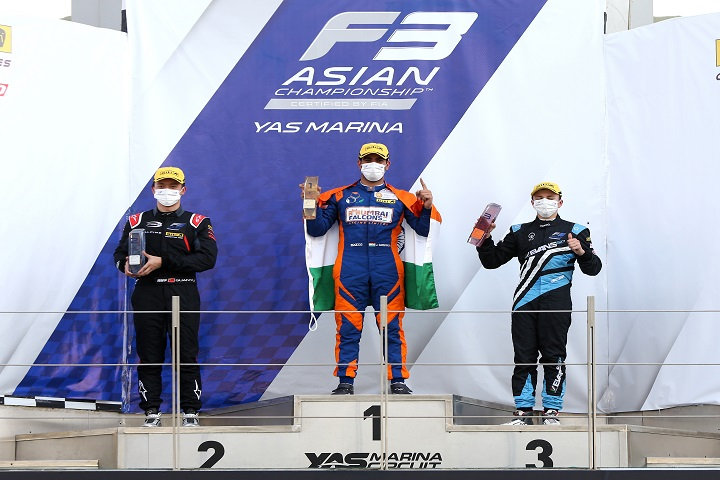
Jehan Daruvala in F3 Asian Championship

Mumbai Falcons is an Indian motorsports team established by Ameet Harjinder Gadhoke, Navjeet Singh Gadhoke and Teja Ranade Gadhoke in November 2019.

== History ==
The team was founded in November 2019 by Gadhoke Group. They made their debut in November 2019 in the X1RL league with their 5 drivers Kush Maini, Mikkel Jensen, Pippa Mann, Karthik Tharani and Sohil Shah. They entered F3 Asian championship in 2021. The team became the first Indian team to compete and finish in the top 3 in F3 Asian Championship with the drivers Kush Maini and Jehan Daruvala. The team had Armaan Ebrahim as team principal. It is also mentored by Kapil Dev. The team's cars were operated by Prema Powerteam.

On 20 February 2022, Mumbai Falcons secured a historic double victory in the Formula Regional Asian Championship held at UAE winning both the Driver and Teams Championship. Greater success came in 2023, winning both titles in the inaugural Formula Regional Middle East Championship with Andrea Kimi Antonelli, and the F4 UAE Championship with James Wharton.

== Current series results ==
=== Formula Regional Middle East Championship ===
Year	Car	Driver	Races	Wins	Poles	F/Laps	Points	D.C.	T.C.
2023	Tatuus F3 T-318	(Italy) Andrea Kimi Antonelli	15	3	3	5	192	1st	1st
2023	Tatuus F3 T-318	(Brazil) Rafael Câmara	15	0	0	0	131	3rd	1st
2023	Tatuus F3 T-318	(Spain) Lorenzo Fluxá	15	0	0	0	122	4th	1st
2023	Tatuus F3 T-318	(Sweden) Dino Beganovic	6	2	0	1	62	11th	1st
2023	Tatuus F3 T-318	Kirill Smal	9	0	0	0	32	15th	1st
2024	Tatuus F3 T-318	(Brazil) Rafael Câmara	15	2	1	2	128	3rd	3rd
2024	Tatuus F3 T-318	(Australia) James Wharton	15	0	0	0	111	6th	3rd
2024	Tatuus F3 T-318	(United States) Ugo Ugochukwu	15	0	0	0	105	7th	3rd
2024	Tatuus F3 T-318	(United Kingdom) Arvid Lindblad	9	1	0	0	33	13th	3rd
2025	Tatuus F3 T-318	(United Kingdom) Freddie Slater	15	4	4	4	228	2nd	1st
2025	Tatuus F3 T-318	(United Arab Emirates) Rashid Al Dhaheri	15	0	0	0	144	6th	1st
2025	Tatuus F3 T-318	(Australia) Jack Beeton	15	1	0	0	65	13th	1st
2025	Tatuus F3 T-318	(United Kingdom) Reza Seewooruthun	9	0	0	0	28	17th	1st
2025	Tatuus F3 T-318	(France) Doriane Pin	6	0	0	0	0	29th	1st
2026	Tatuus T-326	(United Kingdom) Kean Nakamura-Berta	11	2	3	3	151	1st	1st
2026	Tatuus T-326	(United States) Sebastian Wheldon	11	0	1	1	71	5th	1st
2026	Tatuus T-326	(Colombia) Salim Hanna	11	1	0	0	54	10th	1st

=== Formula Trophy UAE ===
Year	Car	Drivers	Races	Wins	Poles	F/Laps	Points	D.C.	T.C.
2024	Tatuus F4-T421	(United Arab Emirates) Rashid Al Dhaheri	5	2	4	4	96	2nd	1st
2024	Tatuus F4-T421	(China) Zhenrui Chi	7	0	1	0	54	5th	1st
2024	Tatuus F4-T421	(Colombia) Salim Hanna	7	0	0	0	40	7th	1st
2024	Tatuus F4-T421	(United States) Sebastian Wheldon	2	1	1	1	37	9th	1st
2025	Tatuus F4-T421	(Turkey) Alp Aksoy	7	2	3	2	105	1st	1st
2025	Tatuus F4-T421	(Ukraine) Oleksandr Bondarev	2	2	2	2	50	8th	1st
2025	Tatuus F4-T421	(United States) Payton Westcott	5	1	0	0	30	10th	1st
2025	Tatuus F4-T421	(Brazil) Bernardo Bernoldi	7	0	0	0	0	23th	1st

=== Formula 4 UAE Championship / F4 Middle East Championship / UAE4 Series ===
Year	Car	Driver	Races	Wins	Poles	F/Laps	Points	D.C.	T.C.
2022	Tatuus F4-T421	(India) Sohil Shah	16	0	0	0	3	24th	N/A (Note: Mumbai Falcons by Xcel wasn't classified in the Teams' Championship. Instead the scored points were counted towards Xcel Motorsport.)
2022	Tatuus F4-T421	(India) Yash Aradhya	8	0	0	0	0	35th	N/A
2022	Tatuus F4-T421	(United Arab Emirates) Kyle Kumaran	4	0	0	0	0	38th	N/A
2022	Tatuus F4-T421	(India) Ruhaan Alva	4	0	0	0	0	40th	N/A
2023	Tatuus F4-T421	(Australia) James Wharton	15	4	4	5	232	1st	1st
2023	Tatuus F4-T421	(Finland) Tuukka Taponen	15	4	2	2	212	2nd	1st
2023	Tatuus F4-T421	(India) Muhammad Ibrahim	9	0	0	0	4	26th	1st
2023	Tatuus F4-T421	(India) Rishon Rajeev	6	0	0	0	0	35th	1st
2024	Tatuus F4-T421	(United Kingdom) Freddie Slater	15	2	0	4	172	1st	1st
2024	Tatuus F4-T421	(United Kingdom) Kean Nakamura-Berta	15	2	2	3	168	2nd	1st
2024	Tatuus F4-T421	(United States) Alex Powell	14	1	1	1	105	6th	1st
2024	Tatuus F4-T421	(United Kingdom) Dion Gowda	15	0	0	0	65	11th	1st
2025	Tatuus F4-T421	(United Kingdom) Kean Nakamura-Berta	15	1	0	2	273	3rd	2nd
2025	Tatuus F4-T421	(Latvia) Tomass Štolcermanis	15	1	0	1	212	4th	2nd
2025	Tatuus F4-T421	(Colombia) Salim Hanna	15	0	0	0	112	6th	2nd
2025	Tatuus F4-T421	(India) Arjun Chheda	15	0	0	0	7	16th	2nd
2026	Tatuus F4-T421	(Ukraine) Oleksandr Bondarev	15	4	2	4	191	1st	2nd
2026	Tatuus F4-T421	(Italy) Niccolò Maccagnani	15	2	0	0	98	4th	2nd
2026	Tatuus F4-T421	(Turkey) Alp Aksoy	15	0	0	0	70	8th	2nd
2026	Tatuus F4-T421	(Italy) Kingsley Zheng	9	0	0	0	13	19th	2nd

== Former series results ==
=== X1 Racing League ===
Year	Car	Drivers	Races	Podiums
2019	Mygale FB02	(India) Sohil Shah (India) Kush Maini (United Kingdom) Pippa Mann (Denmark) Mikkel Jensen (India) Karthik Tharani	8	6

=== F3 Asian Championship/Formula Regional Asian Championship ===
Year	Car	Driver	Races	Wins	Poles	F/Laps	Points	D.C.	T.C.
2021	Tatuus F3 T-318	(India) Jehan Daruvala	15	3	3	3	192	3rd	3rd
2021	Tatuus F3 T-318	(India) Kush Maini	15	0	0	2	55	11th	3rd
2022	Tatuus F3 T-318	(Monaco) Arthur Leclerc	15	4	1	1	218	1st	1st
2022	Tatuus F3 T-318	(Sweden) Dino Beganovic	15	1	0	2	130	5th	1st
2022	Tatuus F3 T-318	(Colombia) Sebastián Montoya	9	2	3	2	92	7th	1st
2022	Tatuus F3 T-318	(United Kingdom) Oliver Bearman	6	0	0	0	29	15th	1st

== Timeline ==
Current series
UAE4 Series	2022–present
Formula Regional Middle East Trophy	2023–present
Formula Trophy UAE	2024–present
Former Series
X1 Racing League	2019
Formula Regional Asian Championship	2021–2022
