= Emily Cotty =

British-New Zealand racing driver (born 2009)

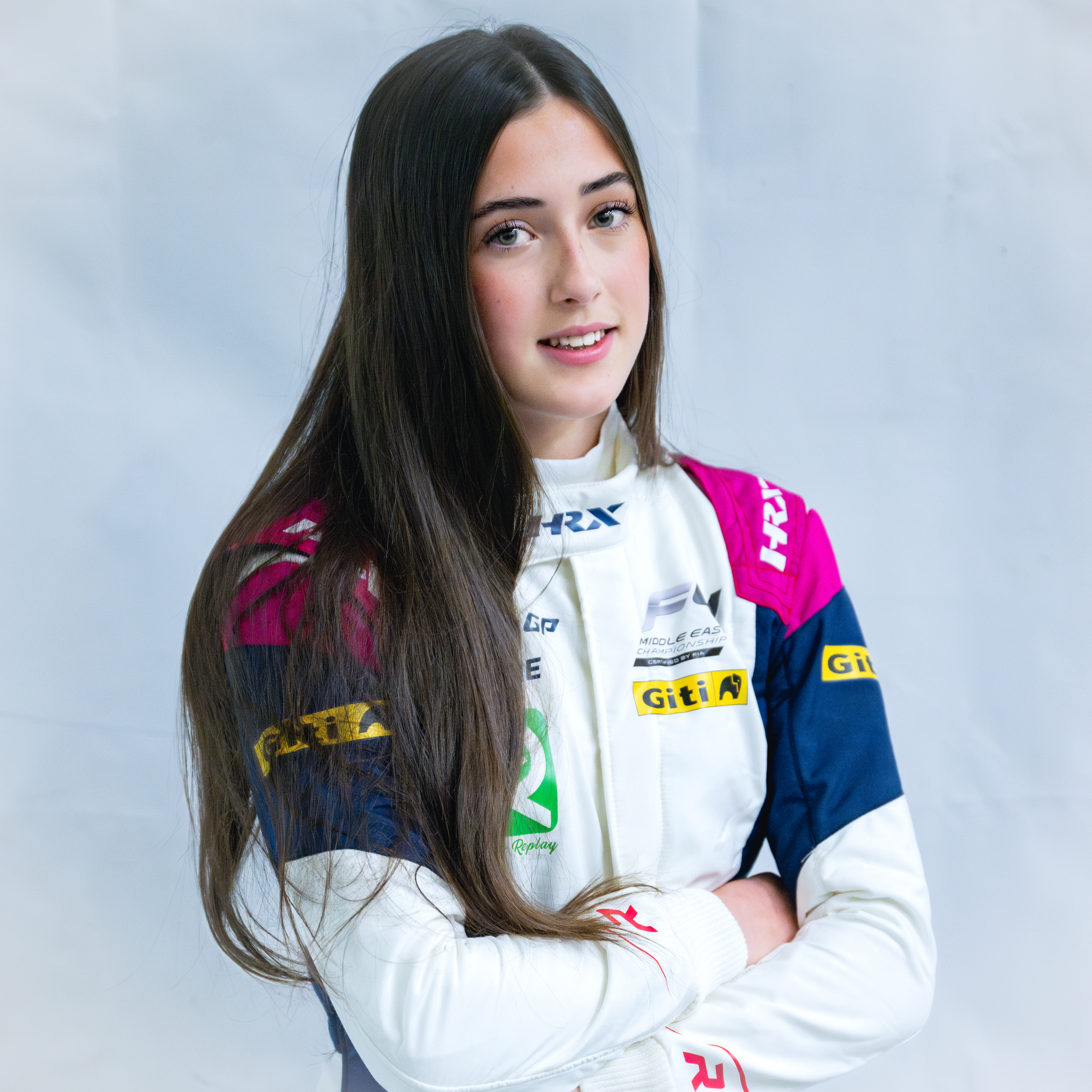
- Cotty in 2025
- Nationality: (United Kingdom) British (New Zealand) New Zealander via double nationality
- Born: 14 August 2009 (age 17) Chichester, United Kingdom

Italian F4 Championship career
- Debut season: 2025
- Current team: R-ace GP
- Categorisation: FIA Silver
- Car number: 42
- Starts: 24
- Wins: 0
- Podiums: 0
- Poles: 0
- Fastest laps: 0

Previous series
- 2026 2025 2025 2025 2024–2025 2024: UAE4 Series; E4; F4 Middle East; Formula Winter Series; F4 British; Formula Trophy UAE

Championship titles
- 2025 2025: Italian F4 – Women's Trophy; E4 – Women's Trophy

Emily Cotty (born 14 August 2009) is a British and New Zealander racing driver who last competed in the LMP3 class of the Le Mans Cup for Bretton Racing.

== Career ==
=== Karting ===
Cotty took up horse riding at an early age, before beginning her karting career when she was nine, with the use of indoor karts. During Covid, Cotty competed in various IKR rounds and in 2022 took the step up into national MSUK club competition, before spending two seasons in the Super One Series, winning the Junior Rotax title in 2024.

=== Formula 4 ===
==== 2024 ====
After a planned drive in Nordic 4 with STEP Motorsport fell through, Cotty elected to test Formula 4 machinery for most of 2024, before making her single-seater debut for Phinsys by Argenti in the F4 British Championship. Racing at the Silverstone (National) round, Cotty finished 18th and 19th in her first two races in single-seaters. Later that year, Cotty competed in Formula Trophy UAE with AGI Sport, finishing the championship in 23rd, with a best result of 15th in the penultimate race at Yas Marina.

==== 2025 ====
Cotty joined the 2025 F4 Middle East Championship as her first full season of single seater racing. Her first points finish came during race 2 at the Dubai Autodrome round, finishing 12th, before taking her best result of 11th the following round at Yas Marina and securing her second rookie podium of the season. During that winter, Cotty also made a one-off appearance for Hitech TGR in the season-ending round of the Formula Winter Series at Barcelona, in which she took a best result of 15th in race one.

Cotty competed in the Italian F4 Championship with R-ace GP. She finished 17th during her debut at the Misano World Circuit for round 1, and 16th during the next round at Vallelunga Circuit. Additional class wins at Monza, Mugello, and Imola helped extend her lead in the championship. Cotty had her personal best finish of the season at the Circuit de Barcelona-Catalunya, finishing in 11th during race two. She clinched the women's title during the final round at Misano by 51 points over rival Payton Westcott.

==== 2026 ====
The following year, Cotty remained with the French team for a dual campaign in the UAE4 Series and Italian F4 Championship. In the former, Cotty scored a best result of second in the reverse-grid race of the first Yas Marina round en route to a tenth-place points finish at the end of the season. Competing in the first four rounds of the season, Cotty took a lone points finish at Misano before leaving the team and series following the first Mugello round.

=== Sportscars ===
Following her departure from single-seaters, Cotty joined Bretton Racing to compete in the LMP3 class of the Le Mans Cup for Bretton Racing at the Algarve finale, in which she finished tenth in LMP3 alongside Bruno Ribeiro. Towards the end of the year, Cotty partook in the European Le Mans Series rookie tests in Forestier Racing by VPS's Ligier JS P325. Following that, Cotty remained with Bretton to compete in the 2026–27 Asian Le Mans Cup in the LMP3 Pro class alongside Calan Williams.

== Karting record ==
=== Karting career summary ===
| Season | Series | Team | Position |
|---|---|---|---|
| 2022 | BMKR Championship – Mini Max | Attaq Motorsport | 11th |
| 2023 | Fulbeck Sprint Series – Junior Rotax | | 44th |
| 2023 | Shenington Kart Racing Club – Junior Max | | 16th |
| 2023 | LGM Series – X30 Junior | Evolve Motorsport | 13th |
| 2023 | Super One Series – Junior Rotax | | 7th |
| 2023 | British Kart Championship – Junior Rotax | Privateer | 61st |
| 2024 | Super One Series – Junior Rotax | | 1st |
| 2024 | Shenington Kart Racing Club – Junior Max | | 24th |
| 2024 | British Kart Championship – Junior Rotax | Argenti Motorsport | 32nd |

== Racing record ==
=== Racing career summary ===
| Season | Series | Team | Races | Wins | Poles | F/Laps | Podiums | Points | Position |
|---|---|---|---|---|---|---|---|---|---|
| 2024 | F4 British Championship | Phinsys by Argenti | 2 | 0 | 0 | 0 | 0 | 0 | 33rd |
| 2024 | Formula Trophy UAE | AGI Sport | 4 | 0 | 0 | 0 | 0 | 0 | 23rd |
| 2025 | Formula Winter Series | Hitech TGR | 3 | 0 | 0 | 0 | 0 | 0 | NC† |
| 2025 | F4 Middle East Championship | R-ace GP | 15 | 0 | 0 | 0 | 0 | 3 | 21st |
| 2025 | Italian F4 Championship | R-ace GP | 18 | 0 | 0 | 0 | 0 | 0 | 31st |
| 2025 | E4 Championship | R-ace GP | 9 | 0 | 0 | 0 | 0 | 0 | 27th |
| 2025 | F4 British Championship | Fortec Motorsport | 2 | 0 | 0 | 0 | 0 | 0 | NC† |
| 2025 | FIA F4 World Cup | | 1 | 0 | 0 | 0 | 0 | —N/a | 12th |
| 2026 | UAE4 Series | R-ace GP | 12 | 0 | 0 | 0 | 1 | 37 | 10th |
| 2026 | Italian F4 Championship | R-ace GP | 10 | 0 | 0 | 0 | 0 | 1 | 48th |
| 2026 | Le Mans Cup – LMP3 | Bretton Racing | 1 | 0 | 0 | 0 | 0 | 1 | 31st |
| 2026–27 | Asian Le Mans Cup – LMP3 Pro | Bretton Racing | | | | | | | |

^{†} As Cotty was a guest driver, she was ineligible for points.
* Season still in progress.

=== Complete F4 British Championship results ===
(key) (Races in bold indicate pole position; races in italics indicate fastest lap)

| Year | Team | 1 | 2 | 3 | 4 | 5 | 6 | 7 | 8 | 9 | 10 | 11 | 12 | 13 | 14 | 15 | 16 | 17 | 18 | 19 | 20 | 21 | 22 | 23 | 24 | 25 | 26 | 27 | 28 | 29 | 30 | 31 | 32 | DC | Points |
|---|---|---|---|---|---|---|---|---|---|---|---|---|---|---|---|---|---|---|---|---|---|---|---|---|---|---|---|---|---|---|---|---|---|---|---|
| 2024 | Phinsys by Argenti | DPN; 1 | DPN; 2 | DPN; 3 | BHI; 1 | BHI; 2 | BHI; 3 | SNE; 1 | SNE; 2 | SNE; 3 | THR; 1 | THR; 2 | THR; 3 | SILGP; 1 | SILGP; 2 | SILGP; 3 | ZAN; 1 | ZAN; 2 | ZAN; 3 | KNO; 1 | KNO; 2 | KNO; 3 | DPGP; 1 | DPGP; 2 | DPGP; 3 | DPGP; 4 | SILN; 1; 19 | SILN; 2 C | SILN; 3; 18 | BHGP; 1 | BHGP; 2 | BHGP; 3 | BHGP; 4 | 33rd | 0 |
| 2025 | Fortec Motorsport | DPN; 1 | DPN; 2 | DPN; 3 | SILGP; 1 | SILGP; 2 | SILGP; 3 | SNE; 1 | SNE; 2 | SNE; 3 | THR; 1 | THR; 2 | THR; 3 | OUL; 1 | OUL; 2 | OUL; 3 | SILGP; 1; 18 | SILGP; 2; 16 | ZAN; 1 | ZAN; 2 | ZAN; 3 | KNO; 1 | KNO; 2 | KNO; 3 | DPGP; 1 | DPGP; 2 | DPGP; 3 | SILN; 1 | SILN; 2 | SILN; 3 | BRH; 1 | BRH; 2 | BRH; 3 | NC† | 0 |

^{†} As Cotty was a guest driver, she was ineligible for points.

=== Complete Formula Trophy UAE results ===
(key) (Races in bold indicate pole position; races in italics indicate fastest lap)

| Year | Team | 1 | 2 | 3 | 4 | 5 | 6 | 7 | DC | Points |
|---|---|---|---|---|---|---|---|---|---|---|
| 2024 | AGI Sport | DUB; 1 | DUB; 2 | DUB; 3 | YMC1; 1; 21 | YMC1; 2 Ret | YMC2; 1; 15 | YMC2; 2; 16 | 23rd | 0 |

=== Complete F4 Middle East Championship / UAE4 Series results ===
(key) (Races in bold indicate pole position; races in italics indicate fastest lap)

| Year | Team | 1 | 2 | 3 | 4 | 5 | 6 | 7 | 8 | 9 | 10 | 11 | 12 | 13 | 14 | 15 | DC | Points |
|---|---|---|---|---|---|---|---|---|---|---|---|---|---|---|---|---|---|---|
| 2025 | R-ace GP | YMC1; 1; 17 | YMC1; 2; 14 | YMC1; 3; 21 | YMC2; 1; 20 | YMC2; 2; 25 | YMC2; 3; 20 | DUB; 1; 20 | DUB; 2; 12 | DUB; 3; 20 | YMC3; 1; 16 | YMC3; 2; 11 | YMC3; 3; 21 | LUS; 1 Ret | LUS; 2; 16 | LUS; 3; 16 | 21st | 3 |
| 2026 | R-ace GP | YMC1; 1; 11 | YMC1; 2; 2 | YMC1; 3; 5 | YMC2; 1; 12 | YMC2; 2; 8 | YMC2; 3; 15 | DUB; 1; 8 | DUB; 2; 13 | DUB; 3; 10 | LUS; 1; 18 | LUS; 2; 16 | LUS; 3; 13 | | | | 10th | 37 |

=== Complete Formula Winter Series results ===
(key) (Races in bold indicate pole position) (Races in italics indicate fastest lap)

| Year | Team | 1 | 2 | 3 | 4 | 5 | 6 | 7 | 8 | 9 | 10 | 11 | 12 | DC | Points |
|---|---|---|---|---|---|---|---|---|---|---|---|---|---|---|---|
| 2025 | Hitech TGR | POR; 1 | POR; 2 | POR; 3 | CRT; 1 | CRT; 2 | CRT; 3 | ARA; 1 | ARA; 2 | ARA; 3 | CAT; 1; 15 | CAT; 2; 18 | CAT; 3; 23 | NC† | 0 |

^{†} As Cotty was a guest driver, she was ineligible for points.

=== Complete Italian F4 Championship results ===
(key) (Races in bold indicate pole position; races in italics indicate fastest lap)

| Year | Team | 1 | 2 | 3 | 4 | 5 | 6 | 7 | 8 | 9 | 10 | 11 | 12 | 13 | 14 | 15 | 16 | 17 | 18 | 19 | 20 | 21 | 22 | 23 | 24 | 25 | 26 | 27 | 28 | DC | Points |
|---|---|---|---|---|---|---|---|---|---|---|---|---|---|---|---|---|---|---|---|---|---|---|---|---|---|---|---|---|---|---|---|
| 2025 | R-ace GP | MIS1; 1; 17 | MIS1; 2 Ret | MIS1; 3 | MIS1; 4; 24 | VLL; 1 | VLL; 2; 16 | VLL; 3; 18 | VLL; 4; 27 | MNZ; 1; 23 | MNZ; 2; 30 | MNZ; 3; 24 | MUG; 1; 21 | MUG; 2; 34† | MUG; 3 WD | IMO; 1; 33† | IMO; 2 C | IMO; 3; 19 | CAT; 1; 23 | CAT; 2; 11 | CAT; 3 C | MIS2; 1; 20 | MIS2; 2; 21 | MIS2; 3 | MIS2; 4 DNQ | MIS2; 5; 20 | | | | 31st | 0 |
| 2026 | R-ace GP | MIS1; 1; 15 | MIS1; 2; 22 | MIS1; 3 | MIS1; 4; 23 | VLL; 1; 19 | VLL; 2; 16 | VLL; 3 | VLL; 4; 30 | MNZ; 1 | MNZ; 2; 27 | MNZ; 3 Ret | MNZ; 4 DNQ | MUG1; 1 Ret | MUG1; 2 | MUG1; 3; 27 | MUG1; 4 DNQ | IMO; 1 | IMO; 2 | IMO; 3 | IMO; 4 | MIS2; 1 | MIS2; 2 | MIS2; 3 | MIS2; 4 | MUG2; 1 | MUG2; 2 | MUG2; 3 | MUG2; 4 | 48th | 1 |

=== Complete E4 Championship results ===
(key) (Races in bold indicate pole position; races in italics indicate fastest lap)

| Year | Team | 1 | 2 | 3 | 4 | 5 | 6 | 7 | 8 | 9 | DC | Points |
|---|---|---|---|---|---|---|---|---|---|---|---|---|
| 2025 | R-ace GP | LEC; 1; 13 | LEC; 2; 20 | LEC; 3 Ret | MUG; 1 Ret | MUG; 2; 27 | MUG; 3; 25 | MNZ; 1; 19 | MNZ; 2; 24 | MNZ; 3; 18 | 27th | 0 |

=== Complete FIA F4 World Cup results ===
| Year | Car | Qualifying | Quali Race | Main Race |
|---|---|---|---|---|
| 2025 | Mygale M21-F4 | 16th | DNF | 12th |

=== Complete Le Mans Cup results ===
(key) (Races in bold indicate pole position; results in italics indicate fastest lap)

| Year | Entrant | Class | Chassis | 1 | 2 | 3 | 4 | 5 | 6 | DC | Points |
|---|---|---|---|---|---|---|---|---|---|---|---|
| 2026 | Bretton Racing | LMP3 | Ligier JS P325 | BAR | LEC | LMS | SPA | SIL | POR; 10 | 31st | 1 |

=== Complete Asian Le Mans Cup results ===
(key) (Races in bold indicate pole position; results in italics indicate fastest lap)

| Year | Entrant | Class | Chassis | 1 | 2 | 3 | 4 | 5 | 6 | DC | Points |
|---|---|---|---|---|---|---|---|---|---|---|---|
| 2026-27 | Bretton Racing | LMP3 | Ligier JS P325 | LEC; 1; 5 | LEC; 2; 8 | JER; 1 | JER; 2 | POR; 1 | POR; 2 | | |
