= 2026 FIA F4 World Cup =

Second edition of the FIA F4 World Cup

2026年國際汽聯四級方程式世界盃
← Previous race

Race details
- Date: 22 November 2026
- Official name: 2026 Macau Formula 4 Race – FIA F4 World Cup
- Location: Guia Circuit, Macau
- Course: Temporary street circuit
- Course length: 6.120 km (3.803 mi)
- Distance: 10 laps, 61.200 km (38.028 mi)
- Weather: Clear

Pole position
Driver	(United Kingdom) Kenzo Craigie	R-ace GP
- Grid positions set by heat results

Fastest lap
Driver	(United Kingdom) Kenzo Craigie	R-ace GP
- Time: 2:22.232 on lap 9

Podium
First	(United Kingdom) Kenzo Craigie	R-ace GP
Second	(Ukraine) Oleksandr Bondarev	SJM Theodore Racing
Third	(United Arab Emirates) Theo Palmer	Hitech

The 2026 FIA F4 World Cup (Chinese: 2026年國際汽聯四級方程式世界盃), officially the 2026 Macau Formula 4 Race – FIA F4 World Cup, was a motor race for Formula 4 (F4) cars held on the Guia Circuit, a street circuit in Macau, on 22 November 2026. A support race for the 2026 Macau Grand Prix, it was the second edition of the FIA F4 World Cup and the sixth F4 race held on the streets of Macau.

Organised by the Sports Bureau of the Macao SAR Government, the event featured a timed qualifying session prior to an eight-lap qualification race, which decided the grid for the 10-lap main event. The Automobile General Association Macao-China (AAMC) and the Fédération Internationale de l'Automobile (FIA) invited 12 teams to the competition, which selected seven former or reigning F4-level champions amongst a 24-driver field.

In wet conditions, Rocco Coronel (MP Motorsport) took pole position for the qualification race, ahead of British champion Dries Van Langendonck (Prema Racing) and Vivek Kanthan (Rodin Motorsport), where all three had opening-lap incidents to allow E4 champion Kenzo Craigie (R-ace GP) to jump six positions, win the race, and subsequently start on pole for the main event. Craigie held off UAE4 champion Oleksandr Bondarev (SJM Theodore Racing) to win the World Cup, as 10 drivers retired on the first lap.

== Background ==
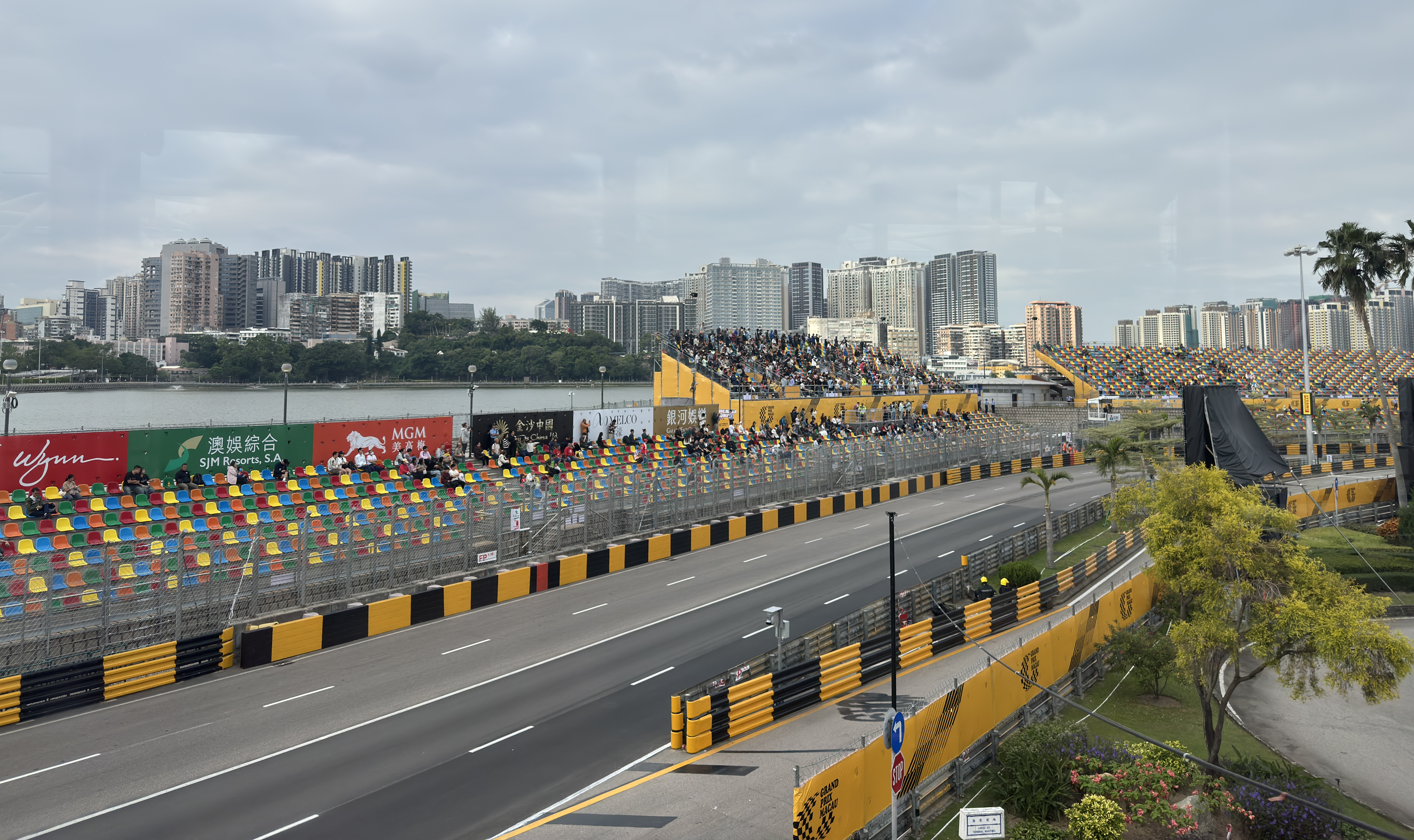
The inaugural FIA F4 World Cup was held at the Macau Grand Prix in 2025, the fifth Macau race in Formula 4 cars.

Open-wheel racing has been contested on the streets of Macau since the debut of Formula Libre in the 1961 edition of the Macau Grand Prix, which was held under Formula Three (F3) regulations from 1983 onwards. In 2013, the Fédération Internationale de l'Automobile (FIA) created the Formula 4 (F4) category upon approval from the FIA World Motor Sport Council (WMSC), which formed the first stage of the FIA Global Pathway from Karting to Formula One and reduced the minimum age for formula racing to 15. The FIA granted World Cup–status to the Macau Grand Prix in 2016. The discussions for an F4 World Cup in Macau was first proposed by Gerhard Berger and the WMSC launched a call for promoters under Stefano Domenicali in 2016; later that year, the FIA requested a trademark for an "F4 World Final" from the Economic Services Bureau of Macau, which was valid from 2017 to 2024.

F4 machinery debuted in Macau at the Grand Prix itself from 2020 to 2022 as a non-championship round of the F4 Chinese Championship, due to travel restrictions caused by the COVID-19 pandemic, and was used for a support race in 2023. Initially a 20-driver, invite-only competition centrally run by the FIA under spec conditions, the inaugural FIA F4 World Cup was held in 2025 and won by Jules Roussel, featuring various champions of the prior F4 season amongst local talent. The FIA's single-seater president, Emanuele Pirro, highlighted that four of the top-five finishers progressed to the Macau Grand Prix the following year. The second World Cup was approved by the WMSC and announced by the FIA in June 2026 as a support race for the Macau Grand Prix in Formula Regional (FR)—held as the FIA FR World Cup—and the FIA GT World Cup in GT3.

=== Entrants ===
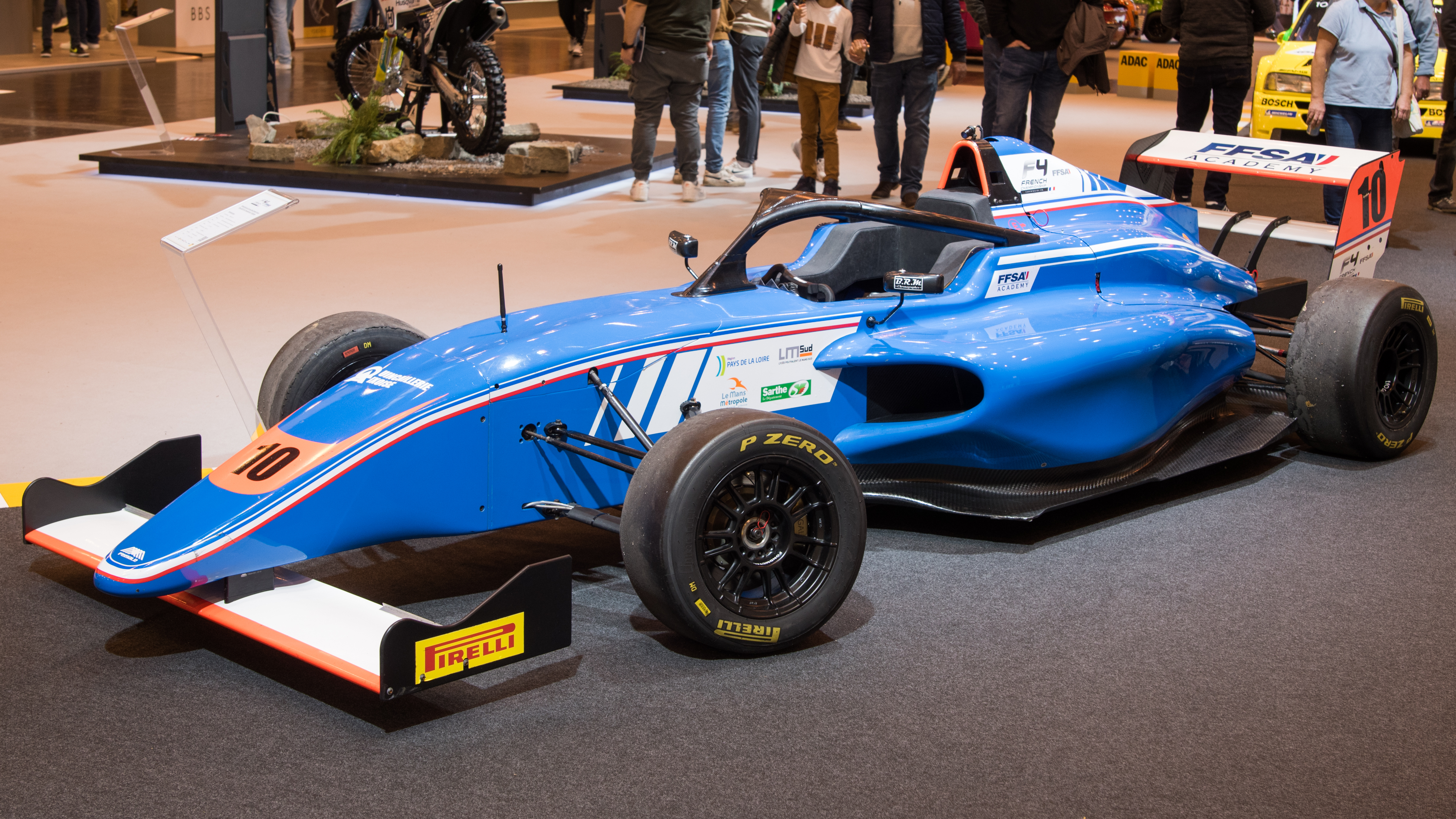
The second FIA F4 World Cup saw a change in chassis from the Mygale M21-F4 to the Tatuus F4-T421.

All competitors used identical Tatuus F4-T421 chassis with an Abarth 1.4L turbocharged inline-four engine and Pirelli tyres, a change from the Ligier-branded Mygale M21-F4 chassis and Alpine 1.3L engines used in 2025. Unlike the inaugural edition—which was centrally-run and funded by the FIA—the event featured 12 independent teams which will field two drivers each, aligning with the format of the Grand Prix itself. The teams were selected by the Automobile General Association Macao-China (AAMC) and the FIA to represent the top-performing teams across the F4 national championships. The driver entries also moved from an invite-only format to being privately organised by the selected teams.

The switch to a multi-team entry model for the second FIA F4 World Cup has already paid dividends with internationally renowned teams from 10 countries taking part. The entry list, which expands from 20 to 24 cars for this year, contains plenty of exciting talent for years to come, drivers for whom this will be their first taste of the Guia Circuit as they build their experience before they progress to the next level.

— FIA Single-Seater Commission President Emanuele Pirro

Entrants from six FIA-certified F4 series were selected by the teams, with one female driver on the entry list—Macanese driver Vernice Lao. Of the 24 drivers entered into the World Cup, six were reigning champions in F4-level series—Oleksandr Bondarev, Kenzo Craigie, Noah Monteiro, Luka Sammalisto, Kasper Schormans, and Dries Van Langendonck—and one was a former champion: Alp Aksoy. The champions of Brazil, CEZ, China, France, India, Japan, NACAM, Saudi Arabia, and the United States were not selected.

Entry list
Team	No.	Driver	FIA-certified series
(Malaysia) Evans GP	2	(Romania) David Cosma Cristofor	Italian F4
(Malaysia) Evans GP	3	(Vietnam) Ben Anh Nguyễn	Formula Trophy Malaysia (Note: The Formula Trophy Malaysia was not FIA-certified, serving as a replacement for F4 South East Asia.)
(Spain) Campos Racing	5	(Sweden) Scott Kin Lindblom	F4 British
(Spain) Campos Racing	61	(Hong Kong) Kimi Chan	F4 Chinese
(Japan) Hydrangea Kageyama Racing	6	(Monaco) Oscar Repetto (Note: Oscar Repetto replaced Alp Aksoy in the No. 10 Prema Racing from qualifying onwards, leaving the No. 6 Hydrangea Kageyama Racing vacant. Repetto also withdrew due to damage after qualifying.)	Italian F4
(Japan) Hydrangea Kageyama Racing	16	(Japan) Ryusho Nakazato	F4 Japanese
(Japan) Hydrangea Kageyama Racing	16	(Japan) Ryusho Nakazato	F4 Spanish
(United Kingdom) Hitech	7	(United Arab Emirates) Theo Palmer	F4 British
(United Kingdom) Hitech	8	(United Kingdom) Jarrett Clark	F4 British
(United Kingdom) Argenti Motorsport	9	(Italy) Ludovico Busso	Italian F4
(United Kingdom) Argenti Motorsport	19	(Netherlands) Felipe Reijs	F4 Spanish
(United Kingdom) Argenti Motorsport	19	(Netherlands) Felipe Reijs	F4 CEZ
(Italy) Prema Racing	10	(Turkey) Alp Aksoy (Note: Alp Aksoy withdrew from the competition with injury after free practice one.)	Italian F4
(Italy) Prema Racing	10	(Monaco) Oscar Repetto	Italian F4
(Italy) Prema Racing	15	(Belgium) Dries Van Langendonck	Formula Winter Series† (Note: The Formula Winter Series was not FIA-certified.)
(Italy) Prema Racing	15	(Belgium) Dries Van Langendonck	F4 British†
(Germany) US Racing	12	(Australia) Noah Killion	Italian F4
(Germany) US Racing	14	(Finland) Luka Sammalisto	Italian F4†
(France) R-ace GP	17	(France) Andy Consani	Italian F4
(France) R-ace GP	29	(United Kingdom) Kenzo Craigie	Italian F4
(France) R-ace GP	29	(United Kingdom) Kenzo Craigie	E4† (Note: The E4 Championship was not FIA-certified.)
(New Zealand) Rodin Motorsport	22	(Canada) Jensen Burnett	F4 Spanish
(New Zealand) Rodin Motorsport	22	(Canada) Jensen Burnett	Italian F4
(New Zealand) Rodin Motorsport	25	(United States) Vivek Kanthan	F4 Spanish
(Netherlands) MP Motorsport	23	(Netherlands) Rocco Coronel	F4 Spanish
(Netherlands) MP Motorsport	23	(Netherlands) Rocco Coronel	Italian F4
(Netherlands) MP Motorsport	40	(Netherlands) Kasper Schormans	F4 Spanish†
(Macau) SJM Theodore Racing	27	(Ukraine) Oleksandr Bondarev	UAE4† (Note: The UAE4 Series was not FIA-certified.)
(Macau) SJM Theodore Racing	27	(Ukraine) Oleksandr Bondarev	Italian F4
(Macau) SJM Theodore Racing	81	(Portugal) Noah Monteiro	Eurocup-4 Spanish Winter† (Note: The Eurocup-4 Spanish Winter Championship was not FIA-certified.)
(Macau) SJM Theodore Racing	81	(Portugal) Noah Monteiro	F4 Spanish
(Macau) Asia Racing Team RFN	32	(China) Lucas Yu	F4 Chinese
(Macau) Asia Racing Team RFN	88	(Macau) Vernice Lao	F4 Chinese

† Reigning champion in series.

== Practice ==
Two free practice sessions were held: free practice one (FP1) on 19 November 2026 at 10:20 local time (UTC+8) and free practice two (FP2) on 20 November 2026 at 09:25. A chaotic FP1 saw Noah Killion (US Racing) top the session by over 1.6 seconds to teammate Luka Sammalisto and 1.7 to Oscar Repetto (Hydrangea Kageyama Racing). FP2 was held in wet conditions, with Rocco Coronel (MP Motorsport) leading Dries Van Langendonck (Prema Racing) by half a second and Noah Monteiro (SJM Theodore Racing) by 1.8 seconds.

Both sessions were heavily impacted by red flags, with only 14 of the 24 competitors setting a lap time in FP1, and 15 of 23 in FP2. Alp Aksoy sustained hand injuries and had to withdraw from the remainder of the event following an FP1 collision with Andy Consani when Aksoy's crash at Hotel Lisboa left him strewn on circuit. Jensen Burnett, Ryusho Nakazato, Kenzo Craigie, Repetto, Jarrett Clark, and Oleksandr Bondarev each caused red flag incidents, whilst Sammalisto crashed at the end of FP2. Craigie and Repetto each required a chassis change. Burnett further received a 10-place grid penalty for failing to respect yellow flags. Bondarev, David Cosma Cristofor, Scott Kin Lindblom, and Ben Anh Nguyễn did not set a time in either session.

== Qualifying ==
A 40-minute qualifying session was held on 20 November 2026, at 13:40 local time (UTC+8), to determine the grid for the qualification race; conditions were wet with a surface air temperature of 11.9 °C (53.4 °F).

=== Qualifying report ===
Rocco Coronel (MP Motorsport) claimed pole position for the qualification race with a fastest lap time of 2:47.109 (131.8 km/h; 81.9 mph). Due to the stoppages in free practice, many drivers were navigating their first flying laps. On the first lap, Kasper Schormans (MP Motorsport) collided with the wall at Post 15 Bend and caused the first red flag of the session without any lap times set. Upon the resumption, five drivers were able to set a lap: Coronel, Dries Van Langendonck (Prema Racing), R-ace GP teammates Andy Consani and Kenzo Craigie, and Oscar Repetto—who had replaced Aksoy at Prema. Van Langendonck was the first to cross the line, remaining on provisional pole until Coronel usurped him by three-tenths. The remaining laps were cancelled by another red flag, this one caused by Ben Anh Nguyễn (Evans GP) crashing on the entry to Fisherman's Bend, having survived an earlier spin at Hotel Mandarin Oriental.

The weather conditions worsened upon the second restart, with Van Langendonck able to go purple in the fourth sector twice, but unable to improve his overall time. Vivek Kanthan (Rodin Motorsport) was able to snatch third-position on his opening run, beating the times set by the SJM Theodore Racing duo of Oleksandr Bondarev and Noah Monteiro, who were unable to surpass Consani and Craigie. The R-ace GP pair were then split by Noah Killion (US Racing), Jensen Burnett (Rodin Motorsport), and Killion's teammate Luka Sammalisto. A third red flag soon followed when Burnett had a serious collision at Hotel Mandarin Oriental, as Repetto simultaneously repeated his FP2 crash at Paiol. With severe damage to the crash barriers caused by Burnett and track conditions deteriorating, the race director opted to end the session 17 minutes early.

Six drivers fell short of the 107% rule set out in the regulations, requiring drivers to set a lap time within 107% of the fastest lap to be classified: Ludovico Busso and Felipe Reijs (Argenti Motorsport), Ryusho Nakazato (Hydrangea Kageyama Racing), Vernice Lao (Asia Racing Team RFN), Schormans, and Nguyễn. They were each permitted to start in the order of their previous lap times by the stewards. Burnett's fastest time was revoked for causing a red flag, dropping him from sixth to eleventh, with Theo Palmer (Hitech) inheriting his position in the top 10. Later that day, David Cosma Cristofor (Evans GP) was disqualified from the session for a technical infringement—due to non-conformities with his left rear-wing endplate—but appealed his disqualification, preventing him from being placed last on the grid.

=== Qualifying classification ===
Qualifying classification
Pos.	No.	Driver	Team	Time	Gap	Final grid
1	23	(Netherlands) Rocco Coronel	MP Motorsport	2:47.109	—	1
2	15	(Belgium) Dries Van Langendonck	Prema Racing	2:47.479	+0.370	2
3	25	(United States) Vivek Kanthan	Rodin Motorsport	2:48.004	+0.895	3
4	17	(France) Andy Consani	R-ace GP	2:48.918	+1.809	4
5	12	(Australia) Noah Killion	US Racing	2:49.071	+1.962	5
6	14	(Finland) Luka Sammalisto	US Racing	2:49.959	+2.850	6
7	29	(United Kingdom) Kenzo Craigie	R-ace GP	2:49.977	+2.868	7
8	27	(Ukraine) Oleksandr Bondarev	SJM Theodore Racing	2:50.150	+3.041	8
9	81	(Portugal) Noah Monteiro	SJM Theodore Racing	2:50.542	+3.433	9
10	7	(United Arab Emirates) Theo Palmer	Hitech	2:50.635	+3.526	10
11	22	(Canada) Jensen Burnett	Rodin Motorsport	2:49.673	+2.564	20^{1}
12	8	(United Kingdom) Jarrett Clark	Hitech	2:52.757	+5.648	11
13	10	(Monaco) Oscar Repetto	Prema Racing	2:52.997	+5.888	—^{2}
14	61	(Hong Kong) Kimi Chan	Campos Racing	2:56.036	+8.927	13
15	5	(Sweden) Scott Kin Lindblom	Campos Racing	2:58.198	+11.089	14
16	32	(China) Lucas Yu	Asia Racing Team RFN	2:58.651	+11.542	15
107% time: 2:58.807
NC^{3}	9	(Italy) Ludovico Busso	Argenti Motorsport	2:59.389	+12.280	16^{3}
NC^{3}	19	(Netherlands) Felipe Reijs	Argenti Motorsport	2:59.768	+12.659	17^{3}
NC^{3}	16	(Japan) Ryusho Nakazato	Hydrangea Kageyama Racing	2:59.920	+12.811	18^{3}
NC^{3}	88	(Macau) Vernice Lao	Asia Racing Team RFN	3:08.291	+21.182	19^{3}
NC^{3}	40	(Netherlands) Kasper Schormans	MP Motorsport	No time		21^{3}
NC^{3}	3	(Vietnam) Ben Anh Nguyễn	Evans GP	No time		22^{3}
DSQ	2	(Romania) David Cosma Cristofor	Evans GP	2:55.499	+8.390	12^{4}
WD	10	(Turkey) Alp Aksoy	Prema Racing	Injury		—^{5}

Notes

- ^1 – Jensen Burnett received a 10-place grid penalty for ignoring yellow flags in FP2.
- ^2 – Oscar Repetto withdrew following his crash in the session.
- ^3 – Ludovico Busso, Felipe Reijs, Ryusho Nakazato, Vernice Lao, Kasper Schormans, and Ben Anh Nguyễn each failed to set a lap time within 107% of the fastest time; they were given permission to start in the order of their weekend lap times by the stewards.
- ^4 – David Cosma Cristofor was disqualified for a technical infringement; he was given permission to start by the stewards.
- ^4 – Alp Aksoy withdrew due to an injury in FP1.

== Qualification race ==
The qualification race was held on 21 November 2026, at 11:40 local time (UTC+8), and run for eight laps to determine the grid for the main race; conditions were dry with a surface air temperature of 18.5 °C (65.3 °F).

=== Qualification race report ===
Craigie won the eight-lap qualification race from seventh on the grid, with second-placed Bondarev setting a fastest lap of 2:22.750 (154.3 km/h; 95.9 mph) on the seventh lap. Following his crash in qualifying, Repetto withdrew from the event due to extensive chassis damage to his Prema. Polesitter Coronel held position off the line but was soon caught by a fast-starting Consani, whose challenge around the outside of Hotel Mandarin Oriental saw Coronel suffer a half-spin and Consani sustain suspension damage against the outside wall. Van Langendonck inherited the lead but was challenged by Killion heading into Hotel Lisboa, before Killion missed his braking point and yielded to the escape road whilst Van Langendonck—defending the inside from him—understeered into the exit wall and retired. The ensuing melee also saw Sammalisto, who struggled for grip, graze the same wall. Kanthan had lost several positions following a slow launch, leaving Craigie to gain six places and lead by the end of the first sector, ahead of Monteiro, Bondarev, Palmer, and Sammalisto.

Monteiro quickly lost touch with Craigie and was overtaken by teammate Bondarev on the second lap at Hotel Mandarin Oriental, with Palmer capitalising on this to also pass him at Hotel Lisboa. Sammalisto made his move on the back straight on lap three, before hitting the wall at Moorish and retiring with suspension damage. With gaps having emerged between the top four, they remained in their positions for the remainder of the race, as Bondarev closed the lead to 0.964 seconds. As the race progressed, Scott Kin Lindblom (Campos Racing) began to hunt Cosma Cristofor for fifth; initially able to defend, Cosma Cristofor sustained front-wing damage on the final lap and dropped behind his rivals. Lindblom was followed by his teammate Kimi Chan and Jarrett Clark (Hitech). Schormans—whose participation was in doubt after his qualifying crash—gained 13 positions to finish eighth, including nine on the opening lap.

Elsewhere, Killion recovered from his first-lap excursion at Hotel Lisboa to finish ninth, as Cosma Cristofor was able to hold on to his top-10 position. Kanthan reached twelfth following his slow start and was held behind by Burnett. Coronel managed to gain two positions since his spin to finish eighteenth; he was later penalised for a false start. Consani was able to restart later in the race but could only complete four laps and was thus not classified. The qualification race marked the first session of the weekend without stoppages, as well as the first reference point of the Guia for the drivers, due to the 10 red-flag periods across free practice and qualifying. Craigie—who clinched pole position for the main race with his victory—commented that he could only rely on what he knew from the simulator, whilst Bondarev expressed surprise to be on the podium ensuing the extensive lap-one chaos.

=== Qualification race classification ===
Qualification race classification
Pos.	No.	Driver	Team	Laps	Time/Retired	Grid
1	29	(United Kingdom) Kenzo Craigie	R-ace GP	8	19:19.164	7
2	27	(Ukraine) Oleksandr Bondarev	SJM Theodore Racing	8	+0.964	8
3	7	(United Arab Emirates) Theo Palmer	Hitech	8	+8.922	10
4	81	(Portugal) Noah Monteiro	SJM Theodore Racing	8	+13.345	9
5	5	(Sweden) Scott Kin Lindblom	Campos Racing	8	+24.096	14
6	61	(Hong Kong) Kimi Chan	Campos Racing	8	+24.814	13
7	8	(United Kingdom) Jarrett Clark	Hitech	8	+26.304	11
8	40	(Netherlands) Kasper Schormans	MP Motorsport	8	+26.465	21
9	12	(Australia) Noah Killion	US Racing	8	+45.000	5
10	2	(Romania) David Cosma Cristofor	Evans GP	8	+49.367	12
11	22	(Canada) Jensen Burnett	Rodin Motorsport	8	+51.492	20
12	25	(United States) Vivek Kanthan	Rodin Motorsport	8	+51.701	3
13	32	(China) Lucas Yu	Asia Racing Team RFN	8	+53.614	15
14	9	(Italy) Ludovico Busso	Argenti Motorsport	8	+54.218	16
15	19	(Netherlands) Felipe Reijs	Argenti Motorsport	8	+55.026	17
16	16	(Japan) Ryusho Nakazato	Hydrangea Kageyama Racing	8	+58.481	18
17	3	(Vietnam) Ben Anh Nguyễn	Evans GP	8	+58.520	22
18	23	(Netherlands) Rocco Coronel	MP Motorsport	8	+1:04.027^{1}	1
19	88	(Macau) Vernice Lao	Asia Racing Team RFN	8	+1:11.241	19
Ret	14	(Finland) Luka Sammalisto	US Racing	4	Accident damage	6
NC	17	(France) Andy Consani	R-ace GP	4	+4 laps	4
Ret	15	(Belgium) Dries Van Langendonck	Prema Racing	0	Accident	2
WD	10	(Monaco) Oscar Repetto	Prema Racing	0	Chassis	—^{2}

Notes

- ^1 – Rocco Coronel received a five-second time penalty for a false start.
- ^2 – Oscar Repetto withdrew following his crash in qualifying.

== Main race ==
The main race was held on 22 November 2026, at 09:15 local time (UTC+8), and was run for 10 laps; conditions were dry with a surface air temperature of 20.3 °C (68.5 °F).

=== Main race report ===
Craigie won the 10-lap main race from pole position, leading every lap and achieving a grand chelem with a lap record of 2:22.232 (154.9 km/h; 96.3 mph) on the ninth lap, ahead of Bondarev and Palmer. Craigie held the lead from Bondarev through Hotel Mandarin Oriental and Monteiro overtook Palmer at Hotel Lisboa, before chaos ensued behind. Chan suffered a half-spin whilst battling Lindblom for fifth, clipping the rear left tyre of Killion and colliding with the adjacent Schormans, who was sent spinning across the circuit. The track was blocked in the subsequent melee, with eight other drivers colliding or hitting the barriers in avoidance: Clark, Cosma Cristofor, Lucas Yu (Asia Racing Team RFN), Busso, Reijs, Nguyễn, Lao, and Consani. The quartet of Nakazato, Coronel, Sammalisto, and Van Langendonck—who sustained wing damage from debris—were able to successfully navigate the incident from the rear of the field. Consani made it through with severe damage but was unable to continue, whilst Killion was able to repair his car in the pit lane. As the red flag was called before the drivers reached the second sector, the remaining drivers were reset to their original grid order.

After a 28-minute delay due to the 10 stranded cars and extensive on-track debris, the drivers were released from the pits behind the safety car. Craigie accelerated early at the subsequent rolling start and was able to hold the lead by out-braking Bondarev into Hotel Lisboa. Lindblom was also unable to pass Monteiro for fourth, whilst Kanthan took seventh from Burnett. Coronel, Sammalisto, and Van Langendonck were promptly able to dispatch of ninth-placed Nakazato, who struggled for pace at the restart. The remaining seven laps were marked by significant overtaking difficulty and the top-five remained in place. Bondarev was able to repeatedly challenge Craigie at Hotel Lisboa, but Craigie covered the inside each time and held the lead. Monteiro continued to pressure Palmer for third, with Lindblom in close pursuit. Burnett dropped out of the lead group and had to defend eighth in the later laps; Coronel and Sammalisto eventually got past him, whilst Van Langendonck ran out of time to make his move.

Craigie set an F4 lap record on the penultimate lap to take Bondarev out of contention, winning the World Cup with a 0.542-second margin. Craigie said "it was a very tricky race. Bondarev was keeping me on my toes at the start and every lap we were defending into [Hotel Lisboa]. But we made it stick every time and the pace we showed at the end was really good to be able to get away". Palmer narrowly held off Monteiro and Lindblom to complete the podium after a mis-shift at the exit of Melco. Monteiro said he was "pretty much robbed" of third by the decisions to reset the grid and have a rolling start after the red flag. After the race, Monteiro and Van Langendonck both received 10-second stop-and-go penalties—converted into 30-second time penalties—for their teams connecting laptops to their cars during the stoppage; Monteiro dropped from fourth to tenth and Van Langendonck from eleventh to twelfth.

=== Main race classification ===
Main race classification
Pos.	No.	Driver	Team	Laps	Time/Retired	Grid
1	29	(United Kingdom) Kenzo Craigie	R-ace GP	10	51:17.000	1
2	27	(Ukraine) Oleksandr Bondarev	SJM Theodore Racing	10	+0.542	2
3	7	(United Arab Emirates) Theo Palmer	Hitech	10	+2.367	3
4	5	(Sweden) Scott Kin Lindblom	Campos Racing	10	+4.074	5
5	12	(Australia) Noah Killion	US Racing	10	+7.153	9
6	25	(United States) Vivek Kanthan	Rodin Motorsport	10	+8.084	12
7	23	(Netherlands) Rocco Coronel	MP Motorsport	10	+15.432	18
8	14	(Finland) Luka Sammalisto	US Racing	10	+18.759	20
9	22	(Canada) Jensen Burnett	Rodin Motorsport	10	+19.591	11
10	81	(Portugal) Noah Monteiro	SJM Theodore Racing	10	+32.734^{1}	4
11	16	(Japan) Ryusho Nakazato	Hydrangea Kageyama Racing	10	+48.340	16
12	15	(Belgium) Dries Van Langendonck	Prema Racing	10	+50.245^{2}	22
Ret	61	(Hong Kong) Kimi Chan	Campos Racing	0	Collision	6
Ret	8	(United Kingdom) Jarrett Clark	Hitech	0	Collision	7
Ret	40	(Netherlands) Kasper Schormans	MP Motorsport	0	Collision	8
Ret	2	(Romania) David Cosma Cristofor	Evans GP	0	Accident	10
Ret	32	(China) Lucas Yu	Asia Racing Team RFN	0	Accident	13
Ret	9	(Italy) Ludovico Busso	Argenti Motorsport	0	Collision	14
Ret	19	(Netherlands) Felipe Reijs	Argenti Motorsport	0	Collision	15
Ret	3	(Vietnam) Ben Anh Nguyễn	Evans GP	0	Collision	17
Ret	88	(Macau) Vernice Lao	Asia Racing Team RFN	0	Collision	19
Ret	17	(France) Andy Consani	R-ace GP	0	Collision damage	21

Notes

- ^1 – Noah Monteiro finished fourth, but received a 10-second stop-and-go penalty converted into a 30-second time penalty for having a computer connected to his car during the stoppage.
- ^2 – Dries Van Langendonck finished eleventh, but received a 10-second stop-and-go penalty converted into a 30-second time penalty for having a computer connected to his car during the stoppage.

== See also ==
- 2026 Macau Grand Prix
- 2026 FIA GT World Cup
- 2026 Macau Guia Race
