= Oliver Goethe =

German, Danish, and British racing driver (born 2004)

Oliver "Ollie" Goethe
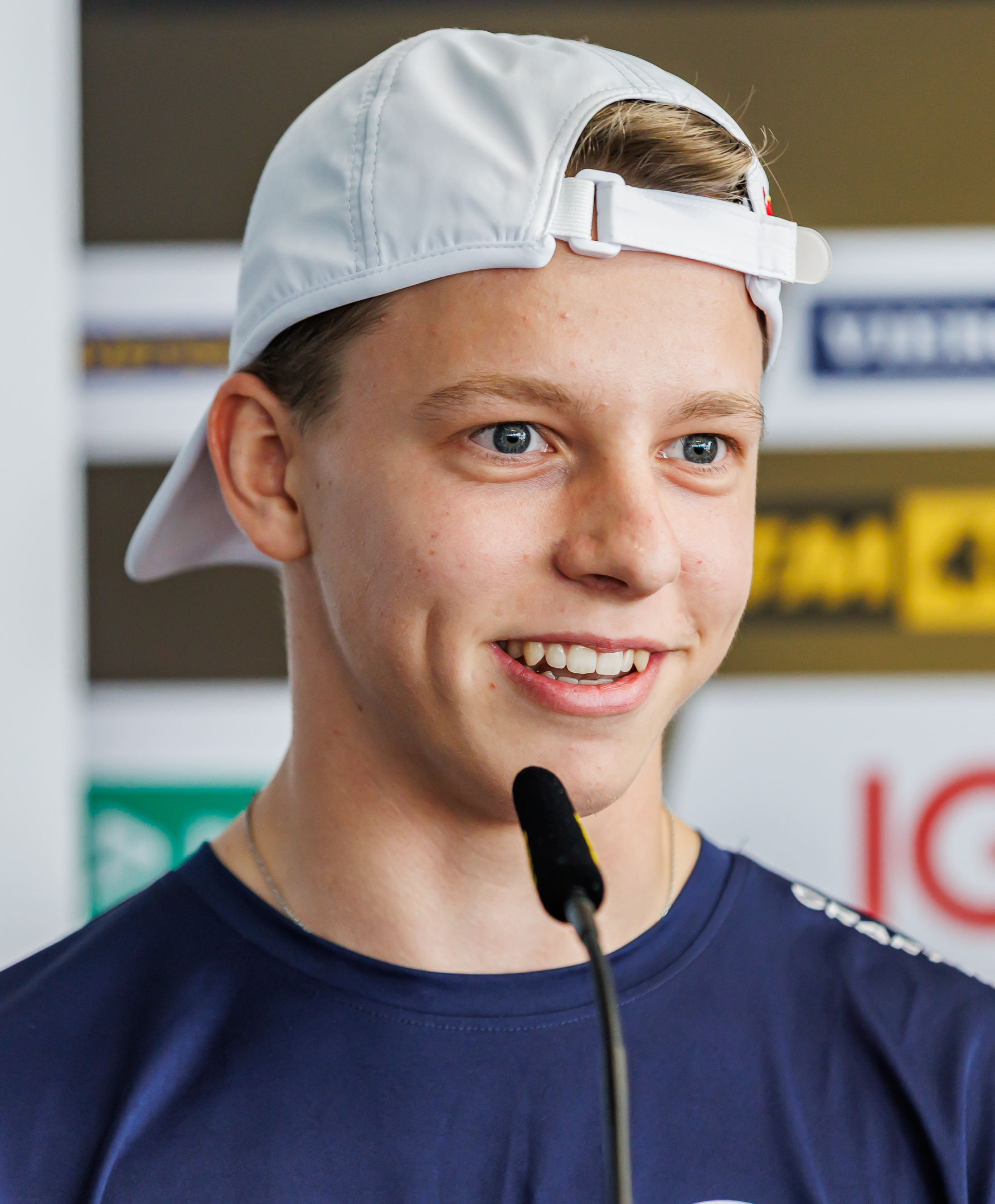
- Goethe in 2024
- Nationality: (Germany) German; (Denmark) Danish; (United Kingdom) British; via triple nationality
- Born: 14 October 2004 (age 22) London, England
- Relatives: Roald Goethe (father); Benjamin Goethe (brother)

FIA Formula 2 Championship career
- Debut season: 2024
- Current team: MP Motorsport
- Categorisation: FIA Silver
- Car number: 10
- Starts: 53
- Wins: 0
- Podiums: 1
- Poles: 0
- Fastest laps: 3
- Best finish: 15th in 2025

Previous series
- 2022–23; 2022–2024; 2022; 2022; 2022; 2021; 2019–2020: Middle East Trophy; FIA Formula 3; Euroformula Open 24H Series; FR Asian; FR European; F4 Spanish

Championship titles
- 2022: Euroformula Open
- Statistics up to date as of 25 August 2026.

Oliver "Ollie" Goethe (Note: Sometimes spelt Gøthe or Göthe.) (Danish: [oˈliˀvɐ ˈkøːtə], German: [ˈɔlivɐ ˈɡøːtə]; born 14 October 2004) is a German, Danish, and British racing driver who competes in the FIA Formula 2 Championship for MP Motorsport.

Goethe recently competed in the FIA Formula 3 Championship for Campos in 2024, and raced for Trident the year prior. He claimed the 2022 Euroformula Open Championship by winning eleven races in his winning campaign. Goethe is also a former member of the Red Bull Junior Team.

He is set to join LN4 Fusion in 2027.

== Career ==
=== Karting ===
Goethe made his international karting debut in 2019, where he raced in both the European and World Championships in the OK class. He then competed in the WSK Super Master Series and WSK Champions Cup in 2020.

=== Lower formulae ===
In 2019, Goethe made his first single-seater appearance, driving for Drivex School in the final round of the F4 Spanish Championship.

Goethe then raced in the series full-time in the 2020 season, this time with MP Motorsport. Being only fifteen years old during most of the season, Goethe achieved six podiums, including a win at the Circuit Paul Ricard. He placed fifth in the rookies' and overall championships respectively at the end of the year.

=== Formula Regional European Championship ===
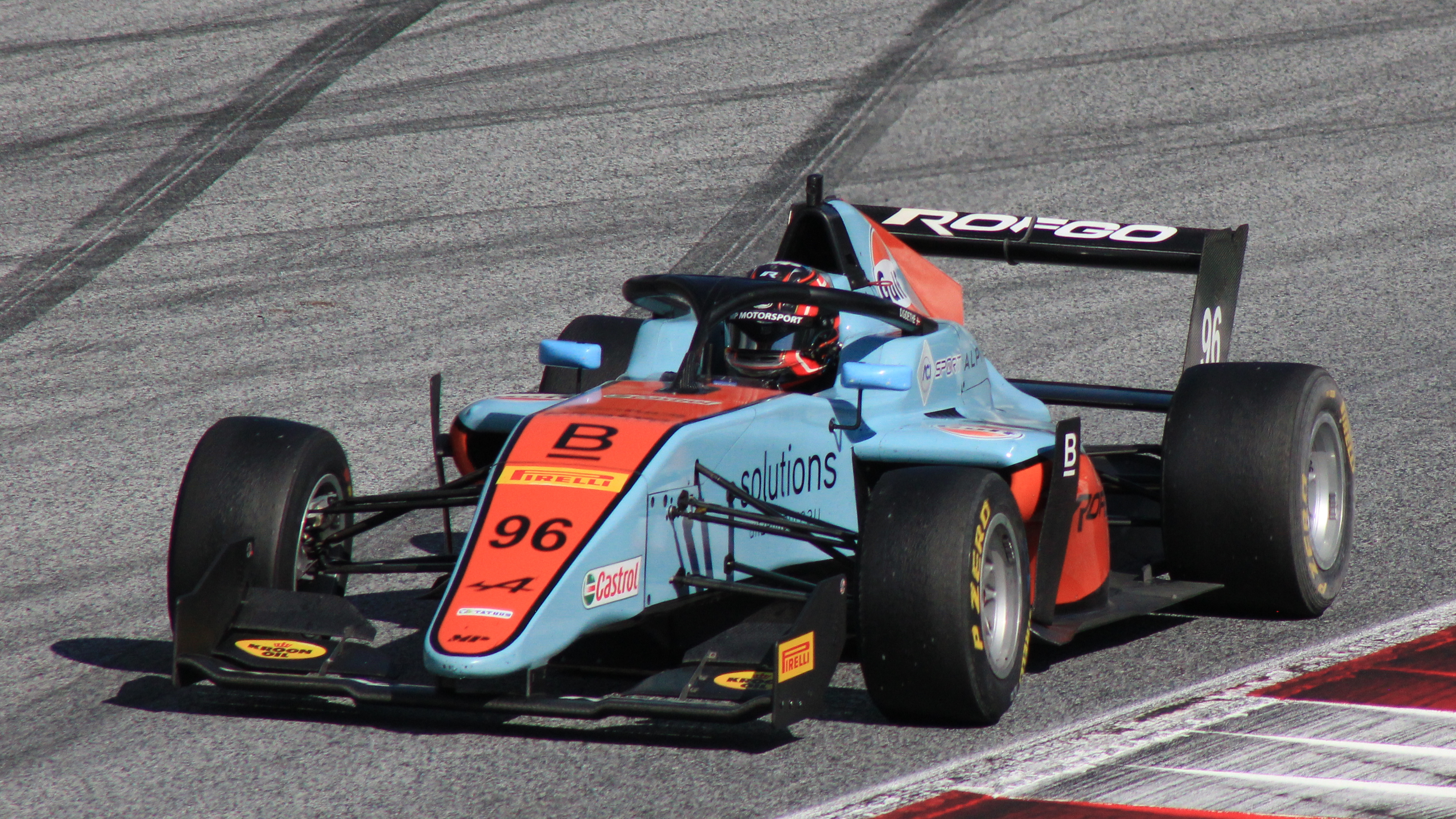
Goethe racing in the 2021 Formula Regional European Championship at the Red Bull Ring

Goethe progressed into the Formula Regional European Championship in 2021, partnering Franco Colapinto and fellow F4 graduate Kas Haverkort at MP Motorsport. He scored his first points in the second race of the first round at Imola, finishing ninth in race two. Goethe's only other points finish came at the second race at Zandvoort, where he ended up in tenth place, and he came 23rd in the overall standings, twelfth-highest of all rookies.

=== Euroformula Open ===
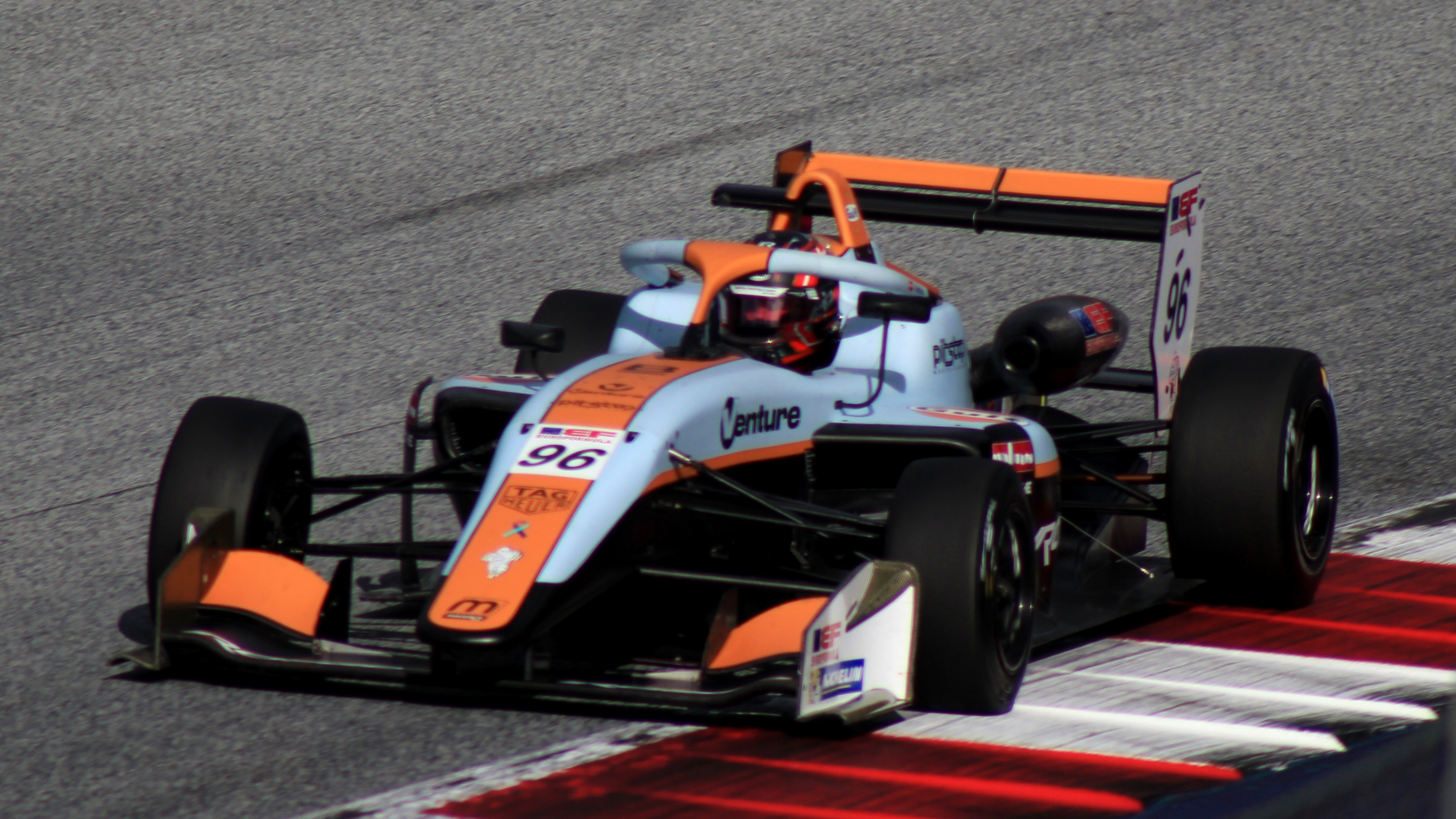
Goethe racing in the 2022 Euroformula Open at the Red Bull Ring.

For 2022, Goethe switched to the Euroformula Open, partnering with Motopark. At the first round at Estoril, he qualified on pole for the first race, but lost multiple places at the start after a slow getaway, although he would recover to finish third later on. He would have another bad start in Race 2, but would fight back to win the race despite a five-second penalty. Continuing his season in similar fashion, Goethe qualified first for both races at the Pau Circuit, taking a win in Race 1 but losing out on the Grand Prix victory on Sunday to Vladislav Lomko and teammate Christian Mansell. He would have a dominant weekend at Le Castellet, winning two of the three races and coming just short in Race 2 to Mansell. Goethe continued his winning streak, taking victory in all three races at the Circuit de Spa-Francorchamps, despite starting the latter pair of races from sixth. At the final round before the summer break, Goethe once again won the opening race and ended his weekend with another podium in Race 3. Following the first half of the season, he remarked that leading the championship "helps the nerves for when I am in future categories". Two more wins at Imola and the Red Bull Ring followed before a disappointing round at Monza, where he encountered a spin in Race 1 and a brake disc failure before Race 2, which prevented him from starting from pole. Undeterred by this, Goethe clinched the title at the final round in Barcelona by winning the first race, finishing the season with eleven wins and a total of 18 podiums.

=== Macau Grand Prix ===
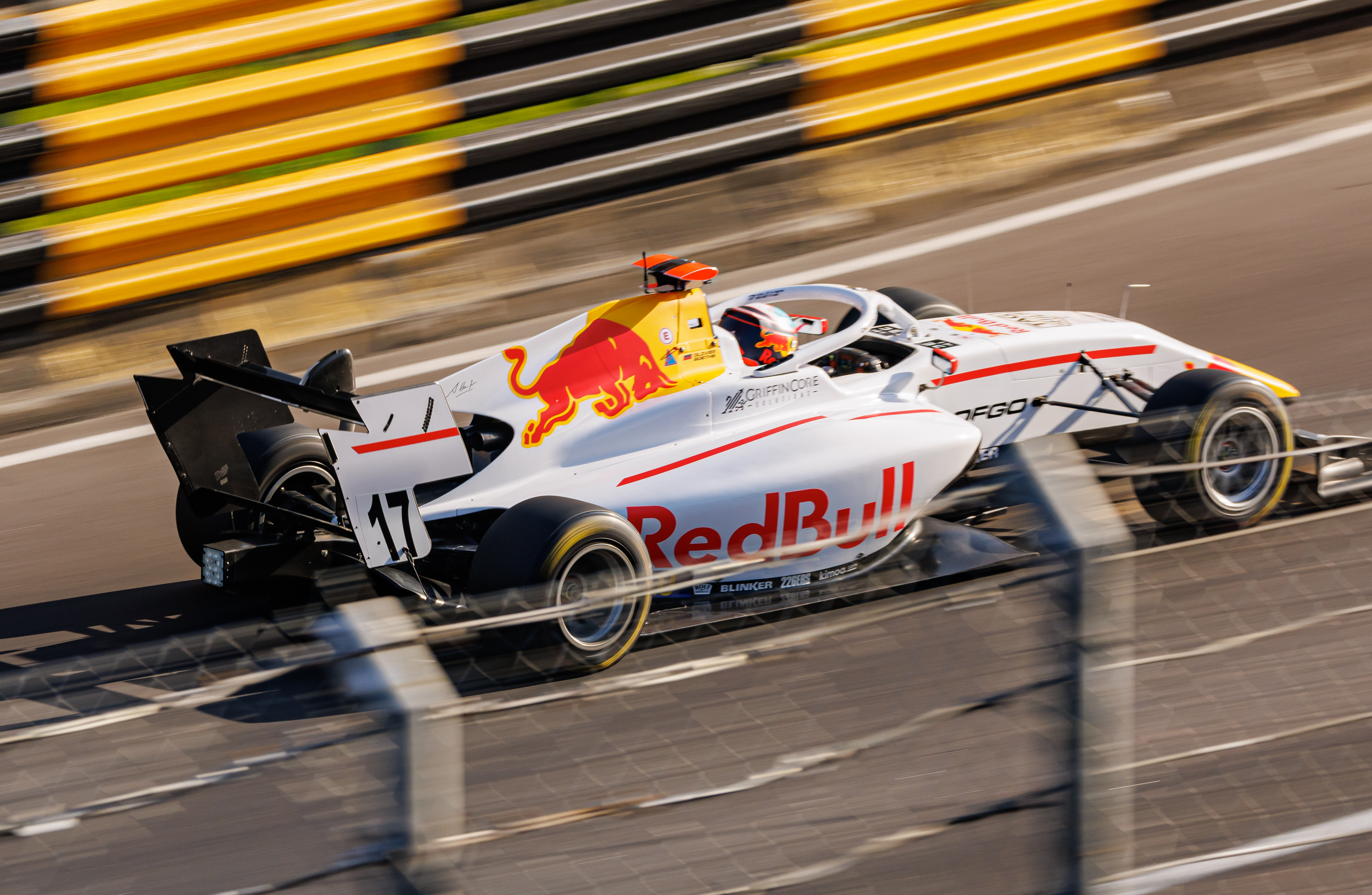
Goethe competing at the 2023 Macau Grand Prix with Campos Racing

In 2023, Goethe participated in the Macau Grand Prix with the Campos. He finished 21st in the qualification race due to a collision on the first lap, but bounced back to ninth in the main race.

Goethe would continue his Macau ambitions for the 2024 event, this time with his Formula 2 team MP Motorsport. He saw a lot more success compared to the previous year, finishing qualifying in second, 0.014 seconds behind Ugo Ugochukwu. Goethe held onto second for the qualification race, and continued the streak by finishing second in the main race. Goethe managed to secure the fastest lap in both races.

=== FIA Formula 3 Championship ===
==== 2022 ====
After Hunter Yeany sustained a broken wrist in the Austrian round, Goethe was drafted to replace him for the Hungary round at Campos Racing. In qualifying, he ended up besting his teammates David Vidales and Pepe Martí, ending up twelfth, thus starting the sprint race from pole position. He dropped from pole position at the start but remained in the top ten throughout the race, ending in eighth after a last-lap collision between Arthur Leclerc and Jak Crawford, giving him three points on his debut. For the Spa-Francorchamps round, he was retained and once again bested his teammates in qualifying, securing a brilliant fourth position. In the sprint race, Goethe collided heavily with Zane Maloney, but luckily both escaped injury. In the feature race, Goethe's race was highly successful even leading the race at one point. He eventually finished fourth, after being passed by Oliver Bearman on the final lap. Goethe returned to his main campaign in the Euroformula Open for the final two rounds of the season and was replaced by Sebastián Montoya. Goethe ended the championship 19th with fifteen points.

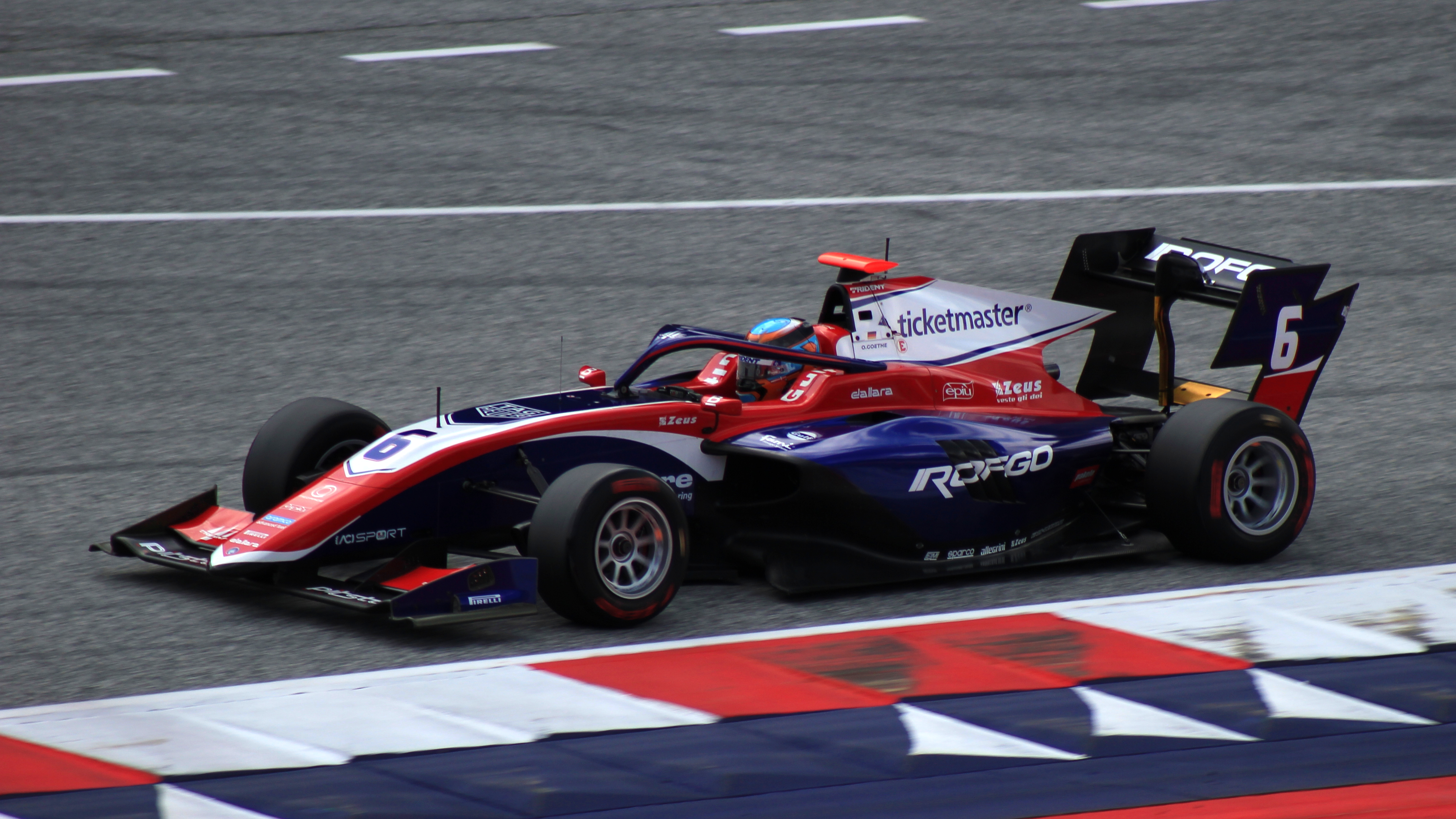
Goethe driving the Dallara F3 2019 during the 2023 Spielberg Formula 3 round.

==== 2023 ====
At the end of September 2022, Goethe partook in the FIA Formula 3 post-season test with Trident on all three days. On 2 December 2022, it was announced that Trident signed Goethe on a full-time basis for the upcoming FIA Formula 3 Championship alongside Gabriel Bortoleto and Leonardo Fornaroli. Goethe qualified fourth on his Trident debut, and marched forward to sixth place. The feature race proved successful as well, as a penalty for Gabriele Minì ahead gave him second place and his first podium. Melbourne though saw Goethe being taken out on the opening lap of the sprint and missing out on points due to a puncture in the feature race. This began a trend of four scoreless events, being stopped only when Goethe managed to take his maiden win in the series at Silverstone, where he converted a front-row starting spot to victory after passing teammate Fornaroli.

Goethe scored a pair of top five finishes at the Hungaroring, though he would become embroiled in the carnage of a wet/dry Spa weekend, where he not only crashed out of the feature race, but also received a ten-place grid drop for the subsequent event after his team was found to have remained on the grid after the 15-second signal. The final round at Monza began in a curious manner, as Goethe was awarded pole position after causing a session-ending red flag via a crash at turn seven; moments before, Goethe had set the fastest laptime of qualifying. During the sprint race, Goethe moved up from 22nd to fifth, gaining two positions post-race due to penalties, though he would end the season with disappointment, as a broken throttle forced Goethe to pull off the grid before the start of Sunday's feature. He finished eighth in the standings, three places ahead of Fornaroli but a long way behind title-winning teammate Bortoleto.

In the Jerez post-season test, Goethe joined Campos Racing, topping the times on the first day.

==== 2024 ====
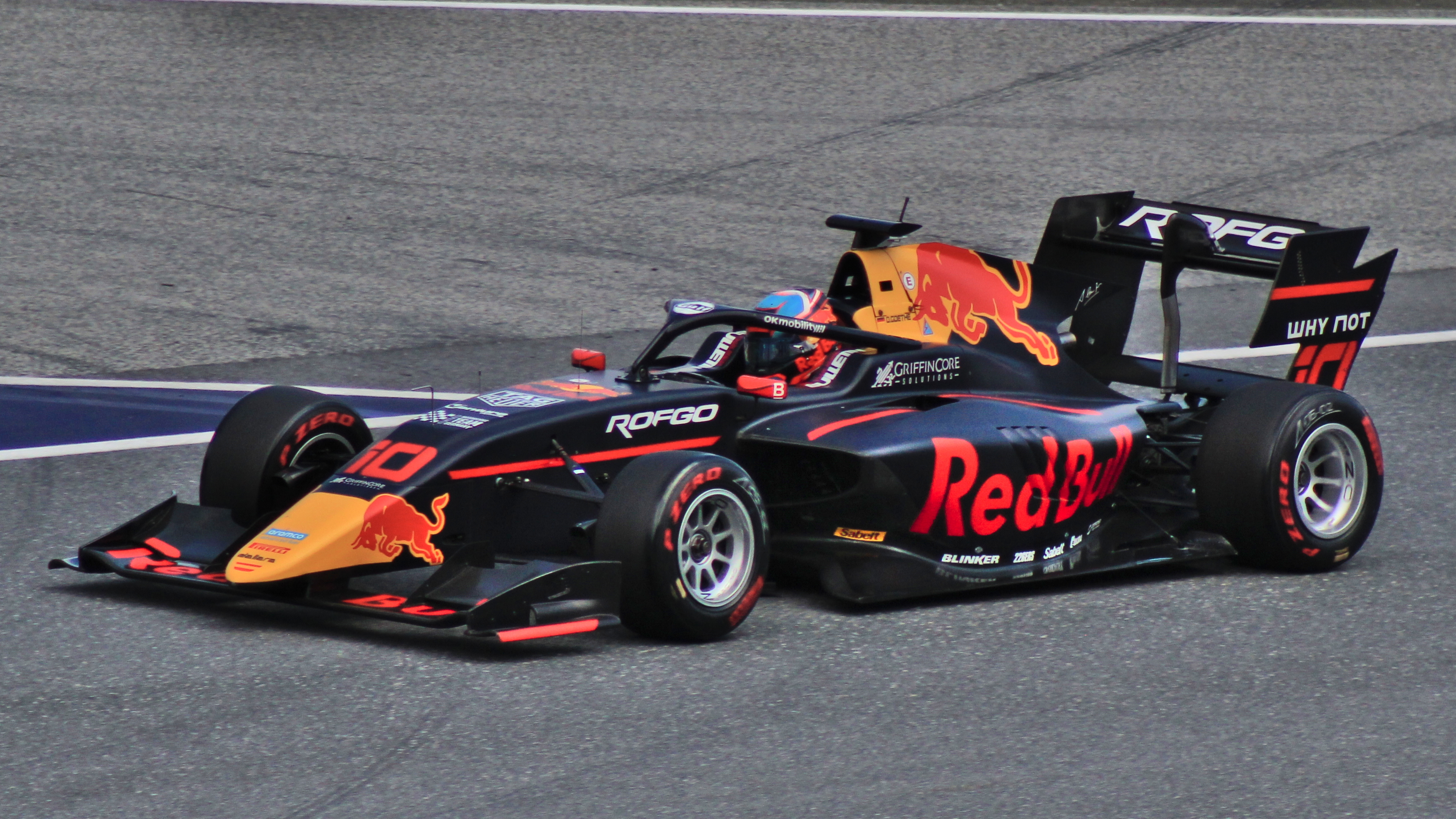
Goethe driving for Campos Racing during the 2024 Spielberg Formula 3 round

In 2024, Goethe remained in the category for a second full season, this time returning to Campos Racing. Following two points-scoring events in Bahrain and Melbourne, he won the Imola sprint race, being reinstated as the victor after initially being penalised for a safety car infringement. He charged through from seventh to first during the feature race, having benefited from an engine issue for Fornaroli, though a later overtake by Sami Meguetounif resulted in second place for Goethe at the flag. He continued being a consistent points scorer throughout the following rounds, with a highlight being third place in the Barcelona sprint race. The streak of consecutive points finishes continued until the sprint race in Silverstone, where Goethe caused a collision with Max Esterson and retired from Saturday's contest. More points came his way in the next two events prior to the break before the season finale; he was seventh in the championship and the final title contender, going into Monza with a 35-point gap to Leonardo Fornaroli.

Goethe would step up to Formula 2 ahead of the season finale, therefore forgoing his title charge.

=== FIA Formula 2 Championship ===
==== 2024 ====
After Franco Colapinto was promoted to the Williams F1 Team ahead of the Monza round, Goethe was promoted to Formula 2 to fill the vacated seat by Colapinto at MP Motorsport. After retiring on Saturday due to a first-lap collision with Zak O'Sullivan, Goethe's Sunday was undone when an early safety car scuppered his strategy of starting on the harder tyre compound, allowing the soft runners to pit early. He would lead a few laps following the safety car restart before pitting and eventually finishing 16th.

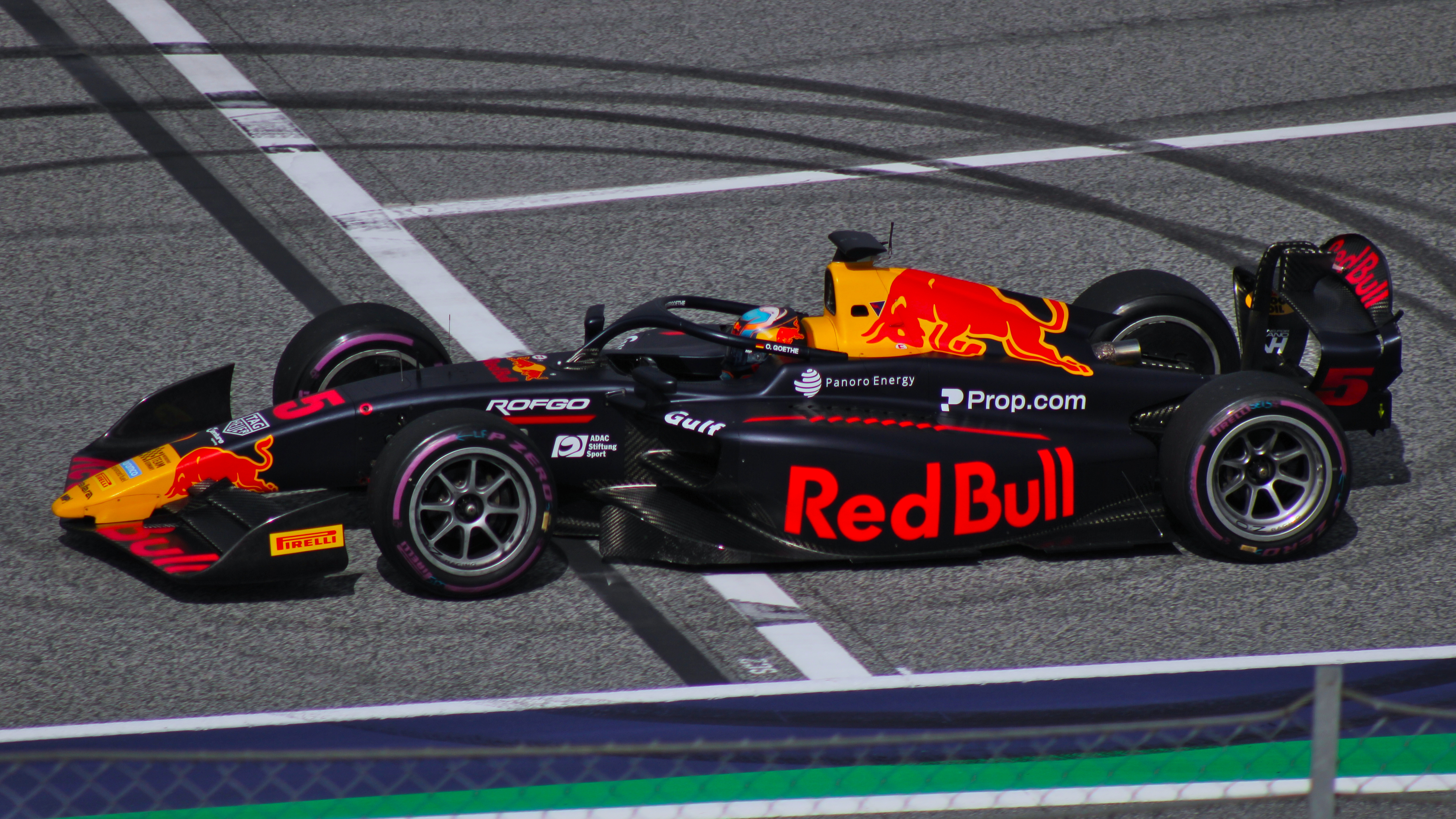
Goethe driving the Dallara F2 2024 during the 2025 Spielberg Formula 2 round

==== 2025 ====
Goethe continued with MP Motorsport for the 2025 Formula 2 Championship alongside Richard Verschoor, marking his first full season in the championship.

==== 2026 ====
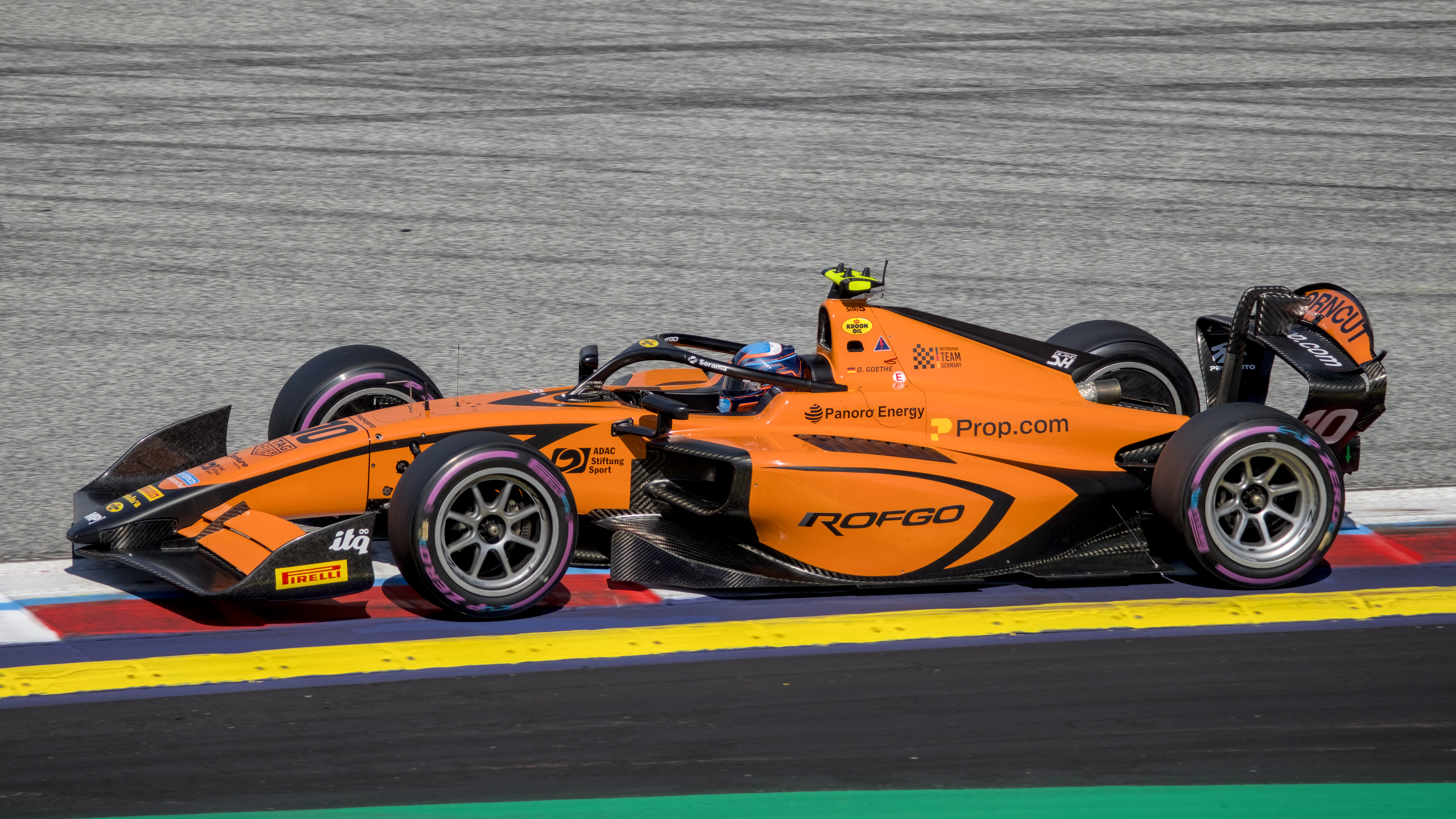
Goethe driving for MP Motorsport during the 2026 Spielberg Formula 2 round

Goethe was retained by MP Motorsport for his second full F2 campaign in 2026, partnering up with Gabriele Minì.

==== 2027 ====
On 16 November 2026, it was confirmed that Goethe would join the newly formed LN4 Fusion team, becoming the team's first of two drivers in the category.

=== Formula One ===
Goethe was a member of the Red Bull Junior Team from November 2023 to December 2025.

== Personal life ==
Goethe was educated at the Millfield School, which is located in Somerset.

Goethe's father, Roald Goethe, is a gentleman driver who competed in the FIA World Endurance Championship and owns a collection of Gulf Oil race cars called ROFGO. His older brother, Benjamin, is also a racing driver who currently competes in sports car racing. He claims to be related to the German writer Johann Wolfgang von Goethe.

== Karting record ==
=== Karting career summary ===
| Season | Series | Team | Position |
|---|---|---|---|
| 2015 | Championnat Regional PACAC — Mini Kart | | 3rd |
| 2015 | Championnat de France — Mini Kart | | 16th |
| 2016 | Championnat de France — Cadet | | 40th |
| 2017 | Finale Nationale X30 — X30 Junior | | 17th |
| 2017 | IAME International Final — X30 Junior | | 110th |
| 2018 | IAME Euro Series — X30 Junior | | NC |
| 2018 | IAME International Final — X30 Junior | | 107th |
| 2018 | WSK Final Cup — OKJ | VDK Racing | 88th |
| 2019 | WSK Champions Cup — OK | VDK Racing | 23rd |
| 2019 | WSK Super Master Series — OK | VDK Racing | 65th |
| 2019 | IAME Series Benelux — X30 Senior | VDK Racing | 101st |
| 2019 | Championnat de France — OK | VDK Racing | 21st |
| 2019 | CIK-FIA European Championship — OK | VDK Racing | 53rd |
| 2019 | CIK-FIA World Championship — OK | VDK Racing | 84th |
| 2019 | IAME International Final — X30 Pro | VDK Racing | 12th |
| 2020 | WSK Champions Cup — OK | VDK Racing | 23rd |
| 2020 | WSK Super Master Series — OK | VDK Racing | 52nd |

=== Complete Karting World Championship results ===
| Year | Team | Class | Quali Heats | Main race |
|---|---|---|---|---|
| 2019 | (United Kingdom) VDK Racing | OK | 84th | DNQ |

== Racing record ==
=== Racing career summary ===
| Season | Series | Team | Races | Wins | Poles | F/Laps | Podiums | Points | Position |
|---|---|---|---|---|---|---|---|---|---|
| 2019 | F4 Spanish Championship | Drivex School | 3 | 0 | 0 | 0 | 0 | 0 | NC† |
| 2020 | F4 Spanish Championship | MP Motorsport | 21 | 1 | 0 | 1 | 6 | 137 | 5th |
| 2021 | Formula Regional European Championship | MP Motorsport | 20 | 0 | 0 | 0 | 0 | 3 | 23rd |
| 2022 | Formula Regional Asian Championship | 3Y Technology by R-ace GP | 13 | 0 | 0 | 0 | 0 | 1 | 25th |
| 2022 | 24H GT Series Continents' - GT4 | Dragon Racing | 1 | 1 | 0 | 0 | 1 | 30 | **3rd** |
| 2022 | Euroformula Open Championship | Team Motopark | 26 | 11 | 7 | 12 | 18 | 473 | **1st** |
| 2022 | FIA Formula 3 Championship | Campos Racing | 4 | 0 | 0 | 0 | 0 | 15 | 19th |
| 2022–23 | Middle East Trophy - GT4 | ROFGO with Dragon Racing | 1 | 1 | 0 | 0 | 1 | 0 | NC† |
| 2023 | FIA Formula 3 Championship | Trident | 17 | 1 | 1 | 1 | 2 | 75 | 8th |
| 2023 | Macau Grand Prix | Campos Racing | 1 | 0 | 0 | 0 | 0 | N/A | 9th |
| 2023–24 | Middle East Trophy - GT3 | ROFGO with Dragon Racing | 1 | 0 | 0 | 0 | 0 | 0 | NC† |
| 2024 | FIA Formula 3 Championship | Campos Racing | 18 | 1 | 0 | 2 | 3 | 94 | 7th |
| 2024 | FIA Formula 2 Championship | MP Motorsport | 8 | 0 | 0 | 0 | 0 | 12 | 23rd |
| 2024 | Macau Grand Prix | MP Motorsport | 1 | 0 | 0 | 1 | 1 | N/A | **2nd** |
| 2025 | FIA Formula 2 Championship | MP Motorsport | 27 | 0 | 0 | 2 | 0 | 37 | 15th |
| 2025–26 | 24H Series Middle East - GT3 | Dragon Racing | | | | | | | |
| 2026 | FIA Formula 2 Championship | MP Motorsport | 8 | 0 | 0 | 0 | 0 | 12 | 16th* |
| 2027 | FIA Formula 2 Championship | LN4 Fusion | 0 | 0 | 0 | 0 | 0 | 0 | TBD |

^{†} As Goethe was a guest driver, he was ineligible to score points.
* Season still in progress.

=== Complete F4 Spanish Championship results ===
(key) (Races in bold indicate pole position) (Races in italics indicate fastest lap)

| Year | Team | 1 | 2 | 3 | 4 | 5 | 6 | 7 | 8 | 9 | 10 | 11 | 12 | 13 | 14 | 15 | 16 | 17 | 18 | 19 | 20 | 21 | DC | Points |
|---|---|---|---|---|---|---|---|---|---|---|---|---|---|---|---|---|---|---|---|---|---|---|---|---|
| 2019 | Drivex School | NAV; 1 | NAV; 2 | NAV; 3 | LEC; 1 | LEC; 2 | LEC; 3 | ARA; 1 | ARA; 2 | ARA; 3 | CRT; 1 | CRT; 2 | CRT; 3 | JER; 1 | JER; 2 | JER; 3 | ALG; 1 | ALG; 2 | ALG; 3 | CAT; 1; 13 | CAT; 2; 16 | CAT; 3; 17 | NC | 0 |
| 2020 | MP Motorsport | NAV; 1; 3 | NAV; 2; 2 | NAV; 3; 2 | LEC; 1; 5 | LEC; 2; 4 | LEC; 3; 1 | JER; 1; 8 | JER; 2; 2 | JER; 3; 10 | CRT; 1; 9 | CRT; 2; 7 | CRT; 3; 15 | ARA; 1 Ret | ARA; 2; 9 | ARA; 3; 4 | JAR; 1; 10 | JAR; 2; 9 | JAR; 3; 3 | CAT; 1; 11 | CAT; 2; 8 | CAT; 3; 7 | 5th | 137 |

=== Complete Formula Regional European Championship results ===
(key) (Races in bold indicate pole position) (Races in italics indicate fastest lap)

| Year | Team | 1 | 2 | 3 | 4 | 5 | 6 | 7 | 8 | 9 | 10 | 11 | 12 | 13 | 14 | 15 | 16 | 17 | 18 | 19 | 20 | DC | Points |
|---|---|---|---|---|---|---|---|---|---|---|---|---|---|---|---|---|---|---|---|---|---|---|---|
| 2021 | MP Motorsport | IMO; 1; 14 | IMO; 2; 9 | CAT; 1; 17 | CAT; 2; 16 | MCO; 1; 18 | MCO; 2; 17 | LEC; 1; 16 | LEC; 2; 16 | ZAN; 1; 14 | ZAN; 2; 10 | SPA; 1; 24 | SPA; 2; 17 | RBR; 1; 16 | RBR; 2; 18 | VAL; 1; 23 | VAL; 2; 29 | MUG; 1; 15 | MUG; 2; 29 | MNZ; 1; 26 | MNZ; 2; 27 | 23rd | 3 |

=== Complete Formula Regional Asian Championship results ===
(key) (Races in bold indicate pole position) (Races in italics indicate the fastest lap of top ten finishers)

| Year | Entrant | 1 | 2 | 3 | 4 | 5 | 6 | 7 | 8 | 9 | 10 | 11 | 12 | 13 | 14 | 15 | DC | Points |
|---|---|---|---|---|---|---|---|---|---|---|---|---|---|---|---|---|---|---|
| 2022 | 3Y by R-ace GP | ABU; 1 Ret | ABU; 2; 14 | ABU; 3; 18 | DUB; 1; 19 | DUB; 2 DNS | DUB; 3 DNS | DUB; 1; 23 | DUB; 2; 18 | DUB; 3; 13 | DUB; 1; 13 | DUB; 2; 12 | DUB; 3; 14 | ABU; 1; 17 | ABU; 2; 10 | ABU; 3; 17 | 25th | 1 |

=== Complete Euroformula Open Championship results ===
(key) (Races in bold indicate pole position) (Races in italics indicate fastest lap)

| Year | Team | 1 | 2 | 3 | 4 | 5 | 6 | 7 | 8 | 9 | 10 | 11 | 12 | 13 | 14 | 15 | 16 | 17 | 18 | 19 | 20 | 21 | 22 | 23 | 24 | 25 | 26 | Pos | Points |
|---|---|---|---|---|---|---|---|---|---|---|---|---|---|---|---|---|---|---|---|---|---|---|---|---|---|---|---|---|---|
| 2022 | Team Motopark | **EST**; **1**; 3 | EST; 2; 1 | EST; 3; 4 | **PAU**; **1**; 1 | **PAU**; **2**; 3 | LEC; 1; 1 | LEC; 2; 2 | LEC; 3; 1* | **SPA**; **1**; 1 | SPA; 2; 1* | SPA; 3; 1* | HUN; 1; 1* | HUN; 2; 4* | HUN; 3; 3 | **IMO**; **1**; 1 | IMO; 2; 3* | IMO; 3; 4 | **RBR**; **1**; 1 | RBR; 2; 6 | RBR; 3; 2 | MNZ; 1; 6 | MNZ; 2; 5 | MNZ; 3; 5 | **CAT**; **1**; 1 | CAT; 2; 5 | CAT; 3; 3* | 1st | 473 |

* – Most positions gained

=== Complete Macau Grand Prix results ===
(key) (Races in italics indicate fastest lap)

| Year | Team | Car | Qualifying | Quali Race | Main race |
|---|---|---|---|---|---|
| 2023 | (Spain) Campos Racing | Dallara F3 2019 | 7th | 21st | 9th |
| 2024 | (Netherlands) MP Motorsport | Tatuus F3 T-318 | **2nd** | **2nd** | **2nd** |

=== Complete FIA Formula 3 Championship results ===
(key) (Races in bold indicate pole position; races in italics indicate points for the fastest lap of top ten finishers)

| Year | Entrant | 1 | 2 | 3 | 4 | 5 | 6 | 7 | 8 | 9 | 10 | 11 | 12 | 13 | 14 | 15 | 16 | 17 | 18 | 19 | 20 | DC | Points |
|---|---|---|---|---|---|---|---|---|---|---|---|---|---|---|---|---|---|---|---|---|---|---|---|
| 2022 | Campos Racing | BHR; SPR | BHR; FEA | IMO; SPR | IMO; FEA | CAT; SPR | CAT; FEA | SIL; SPR | SIL; FEA | RBR; SPR | RBR; FEA | HUN; SPR; 8 | HUN; FEA; 28 | SPA; SPR; Ret | SPA; FEA; 4 | ZAN; SPR | ZAN; FEA | MNZ; SPR | MNZ; FEA | | | 19th | 15 |
| 2023 | Trident | BHR; SPR; 6 | BHR; FEA; 2 | MEL; SPR; Ret | MEL; FEA; 22 | MON; SPR; 17 | MON; FEA; 13 | CAT; SPR; 11 | CAT; FEA; 16 | RBR; SPR; 26 | RBR; FEA; 11 | SIL; SPR; 17 | SIL; FEA; 1 | HUN; SPR; 5 | HUN; FEA; 4 | SPA; SPR; Ret | SPA; FEA; Ret | MNZ; SPR; 5 | **MNZ**; **FEA**; Ret | | | 8th | 75 |
| 2024 | Campos Racing | BHR; SPR; 9 | BHR; FEA; 10 | MEL; SPR; 5 | MEL; FEA; 9 | IMO; SPR; 1 | IMO; FEA; 2 | MON; SPR; 10 | MON; FEA; 10 | CAT; SPR; 3 | CAT; FEA; 4 | RBR; SPR; 7 | RBR; FEA; 5 | SIL; SPR; Ret | SIL; FEA; 6 | HUN; SPR; 11 | HUN; FEA; 8 | SPA; SPR; 6 | SPA; FEA; 19 | MNZ; SPR | MNZ; FEA | 7th | 94 |

=== Complete FIA Formula 2 Championship results ===
(key) (Races in bold indicate pole position) (Races in italics indicate fastest lap)

| Year | Entrant | 1 | 2 | 3 | 4 | 5 | 6 | 7 | 8 | 9 | 10 | 11 | 12 | 13 | 14 | 15 | 16 | 17 | 18 | 19 | 20 | 21 | 22 | 23 | 24 | 25 | 26 | 27 | 28 | 29 | DC | Points |
|---|---|---|---|---|---|---|---|---|---|---|---|---|---|---|---|---|---|---|---|---|---|---|---|---|---|---|---|---|---|---|---|---|
| 2024 | MP Motorsport | BHR; SPR | BHR; FEA | JED; SPR | JED; FEA | MEL; SPR | MEL; FEA | IMO; SPR | IMO; FEA | MON; SPR | MON; FEA | CAT; SPR | CAT; FEA | RBR; SPR | RBR; FEA | SIL; SPR | SIL; FEA | HUN; SPR | HUN; FEA | SPA; SPR | SPA; FEA | MNZ; SPR; Ret | MNZ; FEA; 16 | BAK; SPR; 21 | BAK; FEA; Ret | LSL; SPR; Ret | LSL; FEA; 4 | YMC; SPR; 9 | YMC; FEA; 9 | | 23rd | 14 |
| 2025 | MP Motorsport | MEL; SPR; 11 | MEL; FEA; C | BHR; SPR; 4 | BHR; FEA; 11 | JED; SPR; 11 | JED; FEA; 14 | IMO; SPR; 10 | IMO; FEA; 7 | MON; SPR; 12 | MON; FEA; 10 | CAT; SPR; 18 | CAT; FEA; 16 | RBR; SPR; 11 | RBR; FEA; 17† | SIL; SPR; 11 | SIL; FEA; 11 | SPA; SPR; 4 | SPA; FEA; 13 | HUN; SPR; 7 | HUN; FEA; 8 | MNZ; SPR; 18 | MNZ; FEA; 16 | BAK; SPR; Ret | BAK; FEA; 12 | LSL; SPR; 14 | LSL; FEA; Ret | YMC; SPR; 5 | YMC; FEA; 5 | | 15th | 37 |
| 2026 | MP Motorsport | MEL; SPR; 18 | MEL; FEA; 4 | MIA; SPR; 11 | MIA; FEA; Ret | MTL; SPR; 10 | MTL; FEA; 15† | MON; SPR; Ret | MON; FEA; 14 | CAT; SPR; 11 | CAT; FEA; Ret | RBR; SPR; Ret | RBR; FEA; 3 | SIL; SPR; 16 | SIL; FEA; 18 | SPA; SPR; 8 | SPA; FEA; Ret | HUN; SPR; 12 | HUN; FEA; 18 | MNZ; SPR; 3 | MNZ; FEA; 9 | MAD; SPR; 12 | MAD; FEA; Ret | BAK; SPR; 16 | BAK; FEA1; 14 | BAK; FEA2; 11 | LSL; SPR | LSL; FEA | YMC; SPR | YMC; FEA | 15th* | 37* |
| 2027 | LN4 Fusion | BHR; SPR | BHR; FEA | JED; SPR | JED; FEA | MEL; SPR | MEL; FEA | MTL; SPR | MTL; FEA | MON; SPR | MON; FEA | SIL; SPR | SIL; FEA | RBR; SPR | RBR; FEA | MNZ; SPR | MNZ; FEA | MAD; SPR | MAD; FEA | BAK; SPR | BAK; FEA | IST; SPR | IST; FEA | MXC; SPR | MXC; FEA | LSL; SPR | LSL; FEA | YMC; SPR | YMC; FEA | | TBD | TBD |

* Season still in progress.

== Notes ==
Sporting positions
| Preceded by Cameron Das | Euroformula Open Championship; 2022 | Succeeded by Noel León |
