= David Cosma Cristofor =

Romanian racing driver

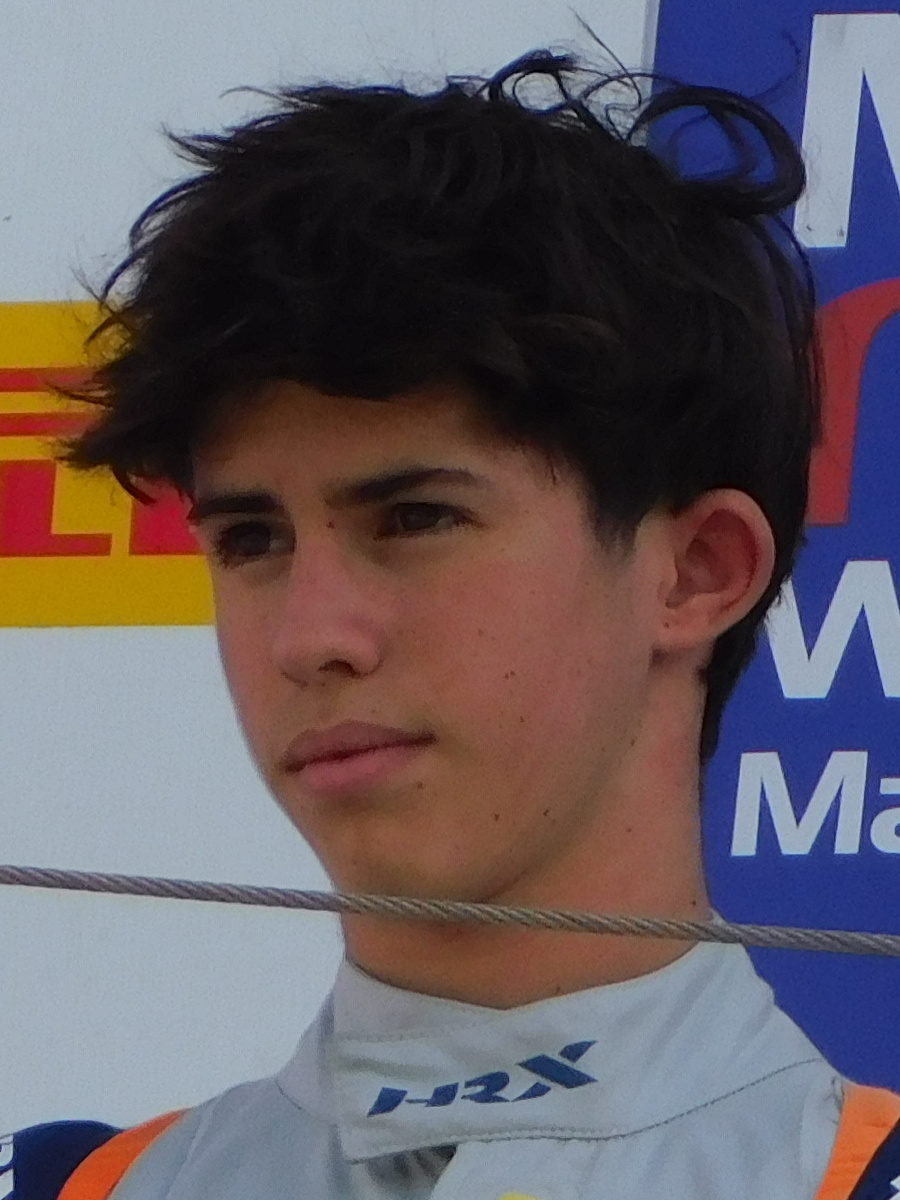
- Cosma Cristofor in 2025
- Nationality: (Romania) Romanian
- Born: 5 February 2009 (age 17) Bucharest, Romania

Italian F4 Championship career
- Debut season: 2025
- Current team: Prema Racing
- Car number: 98
- Former teams: PHM Racing
- Starts: 29
- Wins: 0
- Podiums: 6
- Poles: 1
- Fastest laps: 0
- Best finish: 26th in 2025

Previous series
- 2026 2025 2025: UAE4 Series; Formula Trophy; F4 Middle East
- Statistics up to date as of 31 May 2026.

David Cosma Cristofor (born 5 February 2009) is a Romanian racing driver who currently competes in the Italian F4 Championship for Prema Racing.

== Career ==
=== Karting ===
Cosma Cristofor started karting in 2017 and spent his domestic career with Romanian team, Real Racing. He came second in the 2018 Romanian Karting Masters – Mini ROK and won the title in 2019. He switched to Gulstar Racing in 2021, coming second in the Andrea Margutti Trophy and winning the WSK Final Cup, all in the 60 Mini class. In 2022, he came second in the Romanian Karting Masters – Junior ROK, also for Gulstar Racing.

He joined Kart Republic Motorsport in 2023, where he competed in OK Junior machinery and won that years Andrea Margutti Trophy, he also came fourth in the FIA Karting World Championship. Cosma Cristofor rounded off the year with a second place in the ROK Cup Superfinal – Junior ROK with Zanchi Motorsport. He represented Romania in the 2024 FIA Motorsport Games in karting.

=== Formula 4 ===
==== 2025 ====
Cosma Cristofor made his single-seater debut in the 2025 F4 Middle East Championship for AKCEL GP / PHM Racing, his best result achieved was an eleventh place in the final race at Lusail International Circuit.

With PHM Racing, he competed full-time in the 2025 Italian F4 Championship. He set at shock pole in the second round at Vallelunga Circuit but didn't achieve a single point in the round. His first points did come shortly though, with a tenth and a ninth place in the third round at Monza Circuit. The Romanian's next points came in the final round at Misano World Circuit, as he achieved the best result of his campaign with an eighth in the second race.

He finished off the year in the 2025 Formula Trophy with Xcel Motorsport, getting his first ever podium at Dubai Autodrome in the first round and ended the championship in fifth position.

==== 2026 ====
Cosma Cristofor signed with Prema Racing for the 2026 season and started off the year in the newly formed UAE4 Series, achieving a podium on debut. He had a consistent season and collected and second podium in the final race of the final round at Lusail International Circuit and ended the championship in fifth.

He contested the Italian F4 Championship for a sophomore season as well, accompanied by Prema Racing and started his campaign off at Misano World Circuit, grabbing two podiums. At Vallelunga Circuit, he achieved a pole position and two podiums. In the third round at Monza Circuit, he added two more podiums to his championship tally. Cosma Cristofor claimed another pole position in the first race at Mugello, and came third in the second race. He achieved a double pole position in the final round at Mugello, converting his second pole into another podium. Cosma Cristofor got a final podium in the last race of his F4 Italy campaign and came runner-up to the title.

Cosma Cristofor joined Australian outfit Evans GP to contest in the Formula Trophy Malaysia, with all the rounds held at Sepang International Circuit. He claimed his first podium in the second race of the opening round. In November, he remained with the team to compete in the F4 World Cup.

== Karting record ==
=== Karting career summary ===
Season	Series	Team	Position
2018	Romanian Karting Masters – Mini ROK		2nd
2018	SKUSA SuperNationals XXII – Mini Swift	Real Racing	51st
2019	WSK Euro Series – 60 Mini	Real Racing	
2019	ROK Cup Superfinal – Mini ROK	Real Racing	
2019	Romanian Karting Masters – Mini ROK	Real Racing	1st
2019	WSK Open Cup - 60 Mini	Real Racing	
2019	WSK Final Cup – 60 Mini	Real Racing	
2020	Romanian Karting Championship – Mini		1st
2020	25° South Garda Winter Cup – Mini ROK	Real Racing	
2020	WSK Super Master Series – 60 Mini	Real Racing	
2020	WSK Open Cup – 60 Mini	Gulstar Racing	33rd
2020	Romanian Karting Masters – Mini ROK	Gulstar Racing	5th
2021	WSK Champions Cup – Mini	Gulstar Racing	
2021	Andrea Margutti Trophy – 60 Mini	Gulstar Racing	2nd
2021	WSK Final Cup – 60 Mini	Gulstar Racing	1st
2021	49° Trofeo Delle Industrie – 60 Mini	Gulstar Racing	4th
2021	International Karting Masters – Mini ROK	Gulstar Racing	9th
2021	WSK Super Master Series – 60 Mini		11th
2021	WSK Euro Series – 60 Mini		23rd
2021	WSK Open Cup – 60 Mini		3rd
2021	IAME Euro Series – X30 Mini	Fusion Motorsport	15th
2021	IAME Warriors Final – X30 Mini	Fusion Motorsport	9th
2021	IAME International Final – X30 Mini	Fusion Motorsport	11th
2022	27° Trofeo Ayrton Senna – X30 Senior	Gulstar Racing	9th
2022	Romanian Karting Masters – Junior ROK	Gulstar Racing	2nd
2022	IAME Euro Series – X30 Junior	Fusion Motorsport	20th
2023	Champions of the Future – OK Junior	Kart Republic Motorsport	36th
2023	Andrea Margutti Trophy – OK Junior	Kart Republic Motorsport	1st
2023	WSK Final Cup – OK Junior	Kart Republic Motorsport	8th
2023	FIA Karting World Championship – OK Junior	Kart Republic Motorsport	4th
2023	South Garda Winter Cup – OK Junior	Gulstar Racing	5th
2023	ROK Cup Superfinal – Junior ROK	Zanchi Motorsport	2nd
2024	WSK Champions Cup – OK	Kart Republic Motorsport	28th
2024	CIK-FIA Karting European Championship – OK	Kart Republic Motorsport	22nd
2024	FIA Karting World Championship – OK	Kart Republic Motorsport	27th

== Racing record ==
=== Racing career summary ===
Season	Series	Team	Races	Wins	Poles	F/Laps	Podiums	Points	Position
2025	F4 Middle East Championship	AKCEL GP / PHM Racing	15	0	0	0	0	6	17th
2025	Italian F4 Championship	PHM Racing	20	0	2	0	0	7	26th
2025	Formula Trophy	Xcel Motorsport	7	0	0	0	1	55	5th
2026	UAE4 Series	Prema Racing	12	0	0	0	2	97	5th
2026	Italian F4 Championship	Prema Racing	21	0	4	0	9	357	**2nd**
2026	Formula Trophy Malaysia	Evans GP							
2026	FIA F4 World Cup	Evans GP						—N/a	

* Season still in progress.

=== Complete F4 Middle East Championship results ===
(key) (Races in bold indicate pole position; races in italics indicate fastest lap)

Year	Team	1	2	3	4	5	6	7	8	9	10	11	12	13	14	15	DC	Points
2025	AKCEL GP / PHM Racing	YMC1; 1; 23	YMC1; 2; 12	YMC1; 3; 13	YMC2; 1; 12	YMC2; 2; 20	YMC2; 3; 15	DUB; 1; 22	DUB; 2; 20	DUB; 3; 13	YMC3; 1; 17	YMC3; 2; 12	YMC3; 3; 16	LUS; 1; 16	LUS; 2; 12	LUS; 3; 11	17th	6

=== Complete Italian F4 Championship results ===
(key) (Races in bold indicate pole position; races in italics indicate fastest lap)

Year	Team	1	2	3	4	5	6	7	8	9	10	11	12	13	14	15	16	17	18	19	20	21	22	23	24	25	26	27	28	DC	Points
2025	PHM Racing	MIS1; 1	MIS1; 2; 14	MIS1; 3; 22	MIS1; 4; 22	VLL; 1	**VLL**; **2**; 11	**VLL**; **3**; 14	VLL; 4; 14	MNZ; 1; 10	MNZ; 2; 12	MNZ; 3; 9	MUG; 1; 32	MUG; 2; 33	MUG; 3; 16	IMO; 1; 12	IMO; 2 C	IMO; 3; 23	CAT; 1; 19	CAT; 2; 19	CAT; 3 C	MIS2; 1; 11	MIS2; 2; 8	MIS2; 3	MIS2; 4; 12	MIS2; 5; 17				26th	7
2026	Prema Racing	MIS1; 1	MIS1; 2; 2	MIS1; 3; 2	MIS1; 4; 10	**VLL**; **1**; 8	VLL; 2; 2	VLL; 3	VLL; 4; 3	MNZ; 1	MNZ; 2; 2	MNZ; 3; 3	MNZ; 4; 8	**MUG1**; **1**; 4	MUG1; 2; 3	MUG1; 3	MUG1; 4; 9	IMO; 1; 8	IMO; 2	IMO; 3; 4	IMO; 4; 9	MIS2; 1	MIS2; 2; 9	MIS2; 3; 19	MIS2; 4; 13	MUG2; 1	**MUG2**; **2**; 4	**MUG2**; **3**; 2	MUG2; 4; 3	2nd	357

=== Complete Formula Trophy results ===
(key) (Races in bold indicate pole position; races in italics indicate fastest lap)

Year	Team	1	2	3	4	5	6	7	DC	Points
2025	Xcel Motorsport	DUB; 1; 5	DUB; 2; 3	DUB; 3; 5	YMC1; 1; 4	YMC1; 2; 7	YMC2; 1; 9	YMC2; 2; 16	5th	55

=== Complete UAE4 Series results ===
(key) (Races in bold indicate pole position; races in italics indicate fastest lap)

Year	Team	1	2	3	4	5	6	7	8	9	10	11	12	DC	Points
2026	Prema Racing	YMC1; 1; 3	YMC1; 2; 9	YMC1; 3; 15	YMC2; 1; 7	YMC2; 2; 4	YMC2; 3; 4	DUB; 1; 5	DUB; 2; 5	DUB; 3; 4	LUS; 1 Ret	LUS; 2; 21	LUS; 3; 2	5th	97

=== Complete Formula Trophy Malaysia results ===
(key) (Races in bold indicate pole position; races in italics indicate fastest lap)

Year	Team	1	2	3	4	5	6	7	8	DC	Points
2026	Evans GP	SEP1; 1; 4	SEP1; 2; 3	SEP2; 1	SEP2; 2	SEP2; 3	SEP3; 1	SEP3; 2	SEP3; 3	TBD*	0*
