= 2026 Formula Trophy Malaysia =

Motorsport season

Formula Trophy Malaysia
- 2027 →

The 2026 Formula Trophy Malaysia is the first season of the Formula Trophy Malaysia. The championship is organized and promoted by Top Speed Sports Events LS Limited. It was established as a new series following the cancellation of the Formula 4 South East Asia 2026 season. The series was announced on 31 August 2026.

== Calendar ==
All races are scheduled to be held at the Sepang International Circuit.

Round	Circuit	Date	Supporting
1	(Malaysia) Sepang International Circuit, Sepang	2–4 October	Formula One World Championship
2	(Malaysia) Sepang International Circuit, Sepang	6–8 November	China GT Championship; Toyota Gazoo Racing GR86 Cup Series Malaysia
3	(Malaysia) Sepang International Circuit, Sepang	12–13 December	12 Hours of Sepang; TCR China

== Teams and Drivers ==
Team	No.	Driver	Class	Rounds
(United Arab Emirates) Xcel Motorsport	1	(United Kingdom) Timo Jüngling		2
(United Arab Emirates) Xcel Motorsport	17	(China) Josh Feng		1–2
(United Arab Emirates) Xcel Motorsport	89	(Denmark) Wilmer Lindberg	R	1–2
(United Arab Emirates) Xcel Motorsport	95	(Australia) Christian Ayrouth	R	1–2
(Australia) Evans GP (Note: Cosma Cristofor, Mehta, Mulder, Natiphanon, Nguyễn and Vaessen will be entered under Evans GP, and Kaur and Panzeri will be entered under Evans GP Academy.) (Australia) Evans GP Academy	3	(Romania) David Cosma Cristofor		1
(Australia) Evans GP (Australia) Evans GP Academy	10	(Italy) Ginevra Panzeri		1
(Australia) Evans GP (Australia) Evans GP Academy	22	(Vietnam) Ben Anh Nguyễn		1–2
(Australia) Evans GP (Australia) Evans GP Academy	27	(Netherlands) Juste Mulder		1
(Australia) Evans GP (Australia) Evans GP Academy	66	(Singapore) Kareen Kaur	R	1
(Australia) Evans GP (Australia) Evans GP Academy	68	(Singapore) Rafael Vaessen		1–2
(Australia) Evans GP (Australia) Evans GP Academy	71	(South Africa) Aaryan Singh	R	2
(Australia) Evans GP (Australia) Evans GP Academy	77	(Singapore) Aaron Mehta	R	1–2
(Australia) Evans GP (Australia) Evans GP Academy	88	(Germany) Luke Kaminski	R	2
(Australia) Evans GP (Australia) Evans GP Academy	93	(Thailand) Nawin Natiphanon	R	1
(Malaysia) Axle Sports	5	(India) Arafath Sheikh		2
(Malaysia) Axle Sports	28	(New Zealand) William Beck		1
(Malaysia) Axle Sports	33	(Philippines) Iñigo Anton		1–2
(Malaysia) Axle Sports	39	(Singapore) Skye Lee	R	1–2
(Malaysia) Axle Sports	55	(United Kingdom) Jaime Ambrose (Note: Ambrose is a Singaporean-British driver competing under a British licence.)	R	1–2
(United Kingdom) LN4 Fusion	11	(Ukraine) Oleksandr Bondarev		2
(United Kingdom) LN4 Fusion	24	(Canada) Lucas Nanji		2
(United Kingdom) LN4 Fusion	26	(United Kingdom) Jesse Phillips	R	2
(China) Black Blade Racing	25	(China) Sun Anzhe		1
(China) Black Blade Racing	32	(China) Lucas Yu		2
(China) Black Blade Racing	63	(China) Chen Sicong		1–2
(Republic of Ireland) FTM with Pinnacle Motorsport	48	(United States) Taisei Murakami (Note: Murakami is a Japanese driver competing under an American licence.)	R	1
(Republic of Ireland) FTM with Pinnacle Motorsport	66	(Singapore) Kareen Kaur	R	2
(Republic of Ireland) FTM with Pinnacle Motorsport	69	(New Zealand) Marco Manson		1
(Republic of Ireland) FTM with Pinnacle Motorsport	88	(Malaysia) Imran Putera		1
(Republic of Ireland) FTM with Pinnacle Motorsport	TBA	(China) Wang Yuzhe		TBC

Icon	Legend
R	Rookie

== Results ==
Round		Circuit	Pole position	Fastest lap	Winning driver	Winning team
1	R1	(Malaysia) Sepang International Circuit	(Netherlands) Juste Mulder	(New Zealand) Marco Manson	(New Zealand) Marco Manson	(Republic of Ireland) FTM with Pinnacle Motorsport
1	R2	(Malaysia) Sepang International Circuit	(Vietnam) Ben Anh Nguyễn	(Vietnam) Ben Anh Nguyễn	(Netherlands) Juste Mulder	(Australia) Evans GP
2	R1	(Malaysia) Sepang International Circuit	(Philippines) Iñigo Anton	(Philippines) Iñigo Anton	(Philippines) Iñigo Anton	(Malaysia) Axle Sports
2	R2	(Malaysia) Sepang International Circuit		(United Kingdom) Jesse Phillips	(United Kingdom) Jesse Phillips	(United Kingdom) LN4 Fusion
2	R3	(Malaysia) Sepang International Circuit	(Philippines) Iñigo Anton	(United Kingdom) Jaime Ambrose	(United Kingdom) Timo Jüngling	(United Arab Emirates) Xcel Motorsport
3	R1	(Malaysia) Sepang International Circuit				
3	R2	(Malaysia) Sepang International Circuit				
3	R3	(Malaysia) Sepang International Circuit				

== Championship standings ==
Points are awarded to the top 10 classified finishers in each race.

Position	1st	2nd	3rd	4th	5th	6th	7th	8th	9th	10th
Points	25	18	15	12	10	8	6	4	2	1

=== Drivers' Championship ===
Pos	Driver	SEP1		SEP2			SEP3			Pts
Pos	Driver	R1	R2	R1	R2	R3	R1	R2	R3	Pts
1	(Philippines) Iñigo Anton	5	8	1	8	2				61
2	(United Kingdom) Timo Jüngling			2	17	1				43
3	(Netherlands) Juste Mulder	2	1							43
4	(Singapore) Rafael Vaessen	6	6	5	3	9				43
5	(Vietnam) Ben Anh Nguyễn	3	2	Ret	9	7				41
6	(United Kingdom) Jesse Phillips			7	1	6				39
7	(New Zealand) Marco Manson	1	5							35
8	(Ukraine) Oleksandr Bondarev			4	5	4				34
9	(China) Chen Sicong	8	7	8	2	10				33
10	(United Kingdom) Jaime Ambrose	18	14	3	11	3				30
11	(Singapore) Aaron Mehta	11	4	16†	7	5				28
12	(Romania) David Cosma Cristofor	4	3							27
13	(Canada) Lucas Nanji			6	4	8				24
14	(China) Josh Feng	12	11	12	6	11				8
15	(United States) Taisei Murakami	7	12							6
16	(Italy) Ginevra Panzeri	10	9							3
17	(China) Sun Anzhe	9	15							2
18	(Australia) Christian Ayrouth	17	Ret	9	14	13				2
19	(China) Lucas Yu			WD	10	12				1
20	(India) Arafath Sheikh			10	16	16				1
21	(Malaysia) Imran Putera	16	10							1
22	(Singapore) Kareen Kaur	Ret	17	11	18†	15				0
23	(Denmark) Wilmer Lindberg	Ret	18	14	12	17				0
24	(Germany) Luke Kaminski			13	13	18				0
25	(Singapore) Skye Lee	13	Ret	15	15	14				0
26	(Thailand) Nawin Natiphanon	15	13							0
27	(New Zealand) William Beck	14	16							0
28	(South Africa) Aaryan Singh			Ret	Ret	19†				0
