= Oleksandr Bondarev =

Ukrainian racing driver (born 2009)

- Bondarev in 2025
- Nationality: (Ukraine) Ukrainian
- Born: 27 April 2009 (age 17) Kyiv, Ukraine

Formula Regional European Championship career
- Debut season: 2026
- Current team: R-ace GP
- Car number: 11
- Former teams: Van Amersfoort Racing
- Starts: 5
- Wins: 1
- Podiums: 2
- Poles: 1
- Fastest laps: 0

Previous series
- 2026; 2025–2026; 2025–2026; 2026; 2025; 2025: Eurocup-3; Italian F4; E4; UAE4 Series; Formula Trophy; F4 Middle East

Championship titles
- 2026: UAE4 Series
- Statistics up to date as of 14 October 2026.

Oleksandr "Sasha" Bondarev (Ukrainian: Олександр Бондарев; born 27 April 2009) is a Ukrainian racing driver who is set to compete in the Formula Regional European Championship for R-ace GP as part of the Williams Driver Academy.

Bondarev is a winner of several karting championships including 2024 WSK Champions Cup in OK class. His earlier achievements comprise the 2022 WSK Super Master Series and the 2023 CIK-FIA European Championship, both in the OKJ class. Throughout his single-seater career, Bondarev has won the 2026 UAE4 Series.

== Career ==
=== Karting (2014–2023) ===
==== Early career ====
Bondarev began his karting journey at the age of five, inspired by the animated Pixar animated film Cars about Lightning McQueen. By the age of seven, he became the youngest Ukrainian Karting Champion in the Micro class.

At the age of eight, Bondarev reached the podiums in the Spanish and Portuguese Championships, and won the 2018 CEE Rotax Max Challenge. By the following year he began competing in the WSK Championships in the 60 Mini class.

In 2020, at the age of eleven, Bondarev made his debut in the X30 Junior class, where he secured third place in the Italian Championship. His progression continued in 2021, Bondarev made his debut in the OK Junior class. He finished third in the CIK-FIA Academy Trophy.

In 2022, Bondarev joined the British team Ricky Flynn Motorsport. At the beginning of the season, he won the WSK Super Master Series in the OKJ class and took the third place in the first round of the Champions of the Future.

==== Accident ====
At the end of April 2022, Bondarev was involved in a serious crash during the second round of the CIK-FIA European Championship in Zuera. As a result of the collision, he sustained a severe leg injury, underwent ten surgeries, and was engaged in rehabilitation.

After five months of recovery from the incident, Bondarev took part in the LeCont Trophy in Valencia and finished second.

==== 2023 ====
In 2023, Bondarev joined the Kart Republic team and continued his starts in OKJ class. He finished seventh in the WSK Champions Cup, eighth in the WSK Super Master Series and fifth in the Champions of the Future.

In July 2023, Bondarev became the first Ukrainian driver in the history to win the CIK-FIA European Championship after finishing on the podium in each of the four rounds. In August 2023, Bondarev joined Prema Racing. He finished 14th in the CIK-FIA World Championship and made his debut in the OK class, finishing sixth in the WSK Final Cup.

=== Formula 4 (2024–2026) ===
==== 2024 ====
Bondarev entered the world of single-seater racing in September 2024, competing in the final two rounds of the 2024 Italian F4 Championship with Prema Racing, finishing 30th in the standings.

==== 2025 ====
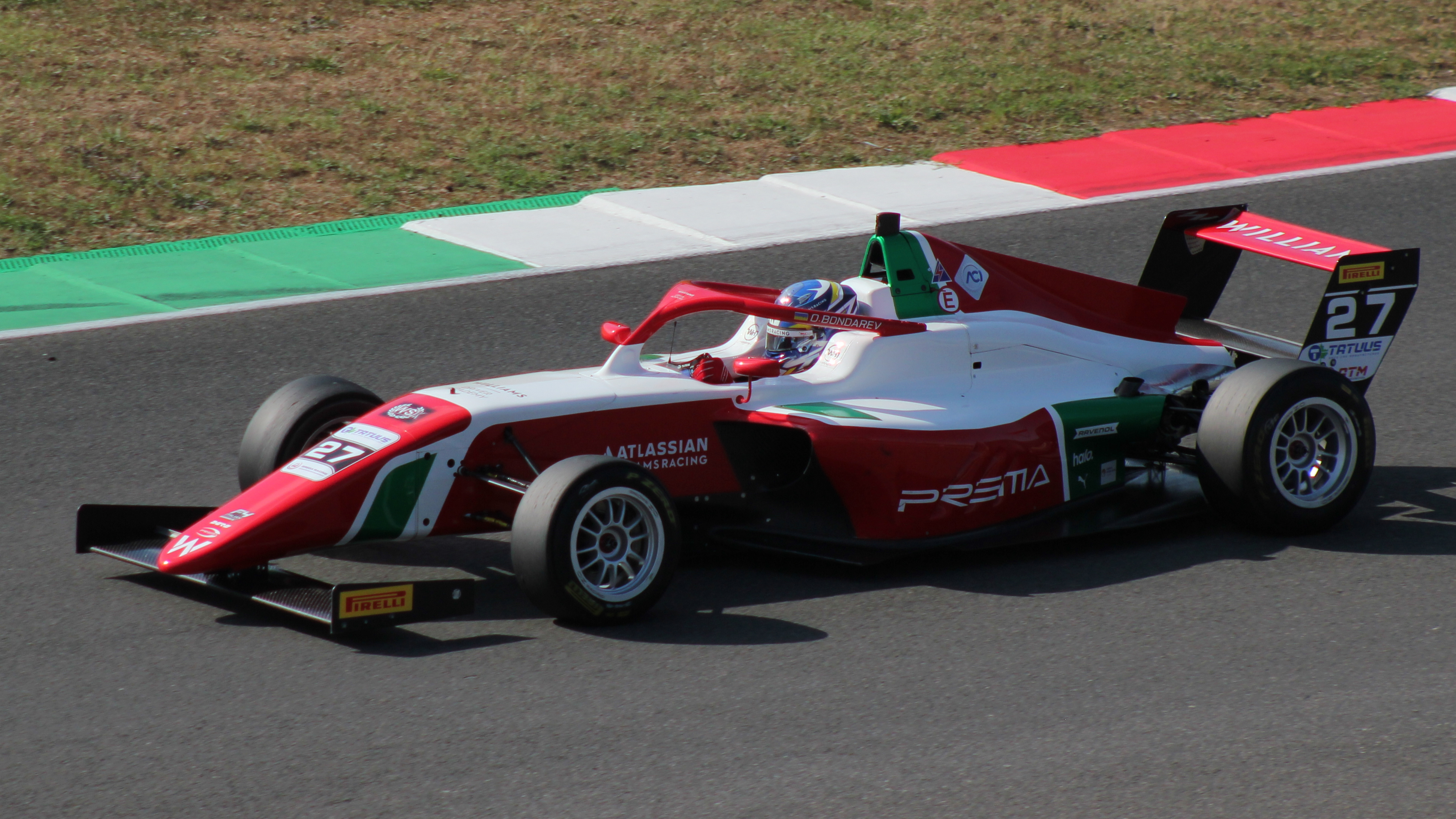
Bondarev driving at the Mugello Circuit during the 2025 Italian F4 Championship

In preparation for his main campaign, Bondarev took part in the F4 Middle East Championship with Prema Racing, finishing 12th in the standings with a best result of sixth. Bondarev continued with Prema for the 2025 Italian F4 Championship, appearing in his first full season in the category alongside the parallel E4 Championship. He took his maiden Italian F4 victory at Imola in August and added a podium at Misano later in the season, ending the year 10th in the standings while winning the E4 rookie title and finishing ninth in the overall E4 points. His performances also contributed to Prema's title in the Italian F4 Constructors' standings.

In December, Bondarev took part in the second round of the 2025 Formula Trophy at the Yas Marina Circuit, driving for Mumbai Falcons alongside the 2025 Abu Dhabi Grand Prix weekend. He took pole position and won both races of the round.

==== 2026 ====
At the start of 2026, Bondarev competed in the newly-renamed UAE4 Series with Mumbai Falcons, taking four race wins on his way to the title and becoming the first Ukrainian driver to win a single-seater championship. Bondarev remained with Prema Racing for a second season in Italian F4, again alongside the E4 Championship. He opened the campaign with a podium finish in the first race of the season at Misano. Bondarev also joined LN4 Fusion for their race debut in round two of Formula Trophy Malaysia on 6–8 November.

=== Formula Regional (2026–) ===
==== 2026 ====
In September 2026, Bondarev joined Van Amersfoort Racing for the final two rounds of the 2026 Formula Regional European Championship in Imola and Hockenheim. After five races, including podium and victory at Race 2 and Race 3 respectively, Oleksandr finished 15th in the overall standings, and 4th in the rookie standings.

==== 2027 ====
In October 2026, R-ace GP announced that Bondarev will compete for them in 2027 Formula Regional European Championship.

=== Formula One ===
In September 2023, it was announced that Bondarev joined the Williams Driver Academy. It is the first time in history that a Formula One team has signed a Ukrainian driver.

== Karting record ==
=== Karting career summary ===
Season	Series	Team	Position
2016	Ukrainian Championship — 60 Mini		**1st**
2016	Ukrainian Karting Cup — Pioneer-N-mini		**1st**
2016	Rotax Max Challenge Ukraine — Micro Max		**1st**
2017	Ukrainian Championship — 60 Mini		**2nd**
2017	Rotax Max Challenge Grand Finals — Micro Max		6th
2018	CEE Rotax Max Challenge		**1st**
2018	WSK Final Cup — 60 Mini	Gamoto ASD	14th
2019	WSK Champions Cup — 60 Mini	Gamoto ASD	64th
2019	WSK Super Master Series — 60 Mini	Gamoto ASD	26th
2019	WSK Euro Series — 60 Mini	Gamoto ASD	50th
2019	WSK Open Cup — 60 Mini	Gamoto ASD	19th
2019	WSK Final Cup — 60 Mini	Gamoto ASD	11th
2020	WSK Champions Cup — 60 Mini	Gamoto ASD	8th
2020	WSK Super Master Series — 60 Mini	Gamoto ASD	29th
2020	Andrea Margutti Trophy — X30 Junior		**2nd**
2020	Italian Championship — X30 Junior		**3rd**
2021	Winter Cup — OKJ	Honta Andriy	6th
2021	WSK Champions Cup — OKJ	Honta Andriy	NC
2021	WSK Super Master Series — OKJ	Honta Andriy	29th
2021	WSK Euro Series — OKJ	Honta Andriy	7th
2021	Champions of the Future — OK	Honta Andriy	47th
2021	German Championship — OKJ	Honta Andriy	NC
2021	CIK-FIA Academy Trophy	Honta Andriy	**3rd**
2021	CIK-FIA European Championship — OKJ	Honta Andriy	21st
2021	CIK-FIA World Championship — OKJ	Honta Andriy	28th
2021	WSK Open Cup — OKJ	Honta Andriy	10th
2021	WSK Final Cup — OKJ	Honta Andriy	NC
2022	Champions of the Future Winter Series — OKJ	Ricky Flynn Motorsport	28th
2022	WSK Super Master Series — OKJ	Ricky Flynn Motorsport	**1st**
2022	Champions of the Future - Euro Series — OK	Ricky Flynn Motorsport	9th
2022	CIK-FIA European Championship — OKJ	Ricky Flynn Motorsport	24th
2022	WSK Final Cup — OKJ	Ricky Flynn Motorsport	28th
2022	LeCont Trophy — OKJ	Ricky Flynn Motorsport	**2nd**
2023	WSK Champions Cup — OKJ	KR Motorsport	7th
2023	WSK Super Master Series — OKJ	KR Motorsport	8th
2023	WSK Euro Series — OKJ	Prema Racing	28th
2023	Champions of the Future — OKJ	Prema Racing	5th
2023	CIK-FIA European Championship — OKJ	KR Motorsport	**1st**
2023	CIK-FIA World Championship — OKJ	Prema Racing	14th
2023	WSK Final Cup — OK	Prema Racing	6th
2024	IAME Winter Cup — X30 Senior	Prema Racing	31st
2024	WSK Champions Cup — OK	Prema Racing	**1st**
2024	WSK Super Master Series — OK	Prema Racing	**2nd**
2024	CIK-FIA European Championship — OK	Prema Racing	26th
2024	CIK-FIA World Championship — OK	Prema Racing	DNF

=== Complete CIK-FIA Karting World Championship results ===
Year	Entrant	Class	Circuit	QH	F
2021	Honta, Andriy	OK-J	(Spain) Campillos	34th	Ret
2023	Prema Racing	OK-J	(Italy) Franciacorta	25th	14th
2024	Prema Racing	OK	(United Kingdom) PF International	16th	Ret

=== Complete CIK-FIA Karting European Championship results ===
(key) (Races in bold indicate pole position; races in italics indicate fastest lap)

Year	Entrant	Class	1	2	3	4	5	6	7	8	Pos	Points
2021	Honta, Andriy	OK-J	GEN; QH; 72	GEN; F NQ	AUB; QH; 32	AUB; F 21	SAR; QH; 10	SAR; F 9	ZUE; QH; 34	ZUE; F 11	21st	13
2022	Ricky Flynn Motorsport	OK-J	POR; QH; 3	POR; F 18	ZUE; QH; 35	ZUE; F DNS	KRI; QH	KRI; F	FRA; QH	FRA; F	24th	8
2023	Prema Racing	OK-J	VAL; QH; 3	VAL; F 2	TRI; QH; 1	**TRI**; **F** 1	ROD; QH; 4	ROD; F 1	CRE; QH; 4	CRE; F 3	1st	256
2024	Prema Racing	OK	VAL; QH; 27	VAL; F 30	ARG; QH; 10	ARG; F 23	SVK; QH; 20	SVK; F DNS	KRI; QH	KRI; F	26th	15

== Racing record ==
=== Racing career summary ===
Season	Series	Team	Races	Wins	Poles	F/Laps	Podiums	Points	Position
2024	Italian F4 Championship	Prema Racing	6	0	0	0	0	0	30th
2025	F4 Middle East Championship	Prema Racing	15	0	0	0	0	54	12th
2025	Italian F4 Championship	Prema Racing	20	1	1	2	2	89	10th
2025	E4 Championship	Prema Racing	9	0	0	0	0	30	9th
2025	Formula Trophy	Mumbai Falcons Racing Limited	2	2	2	2	2	50	8th
2026	UAE4 Series	Mumbai Falcons Racing Limited	12	4	2	4	7	191	**1st**
2026	Italian F4 Championship	Prema Racing	12	0	0	0	2	135	18th
2026	E4 Championship	Prema Racing	6	0	0	0	0	78	8th
2026	Eurocup-3	GRS Team	0	0	0	0	0	0	NC
2026	Formula Regional European Championship	Van Amersfoort Racing	5	1	1	0	2	47	15th
2026	Formula Trophy Malaysia	LN4 Fusion							
2026	FIA F4 World Cup	SJM Theodore Racing	0	0	0	0	0	—N/a	TBD
2027	Formula Regional European Championship	R-ace GP	0	0	0	0	2	0	TBD

^{*} Season still in progress.

=== Complete Italian F4 Championship results ===
(key) (Races in bold indicate pole position) (Races in italics indicate fastest lap)

Year	Team	1	2	3	4	5	6	7	8	9	10	11	12	13	14	15	16	17	18	19	20	21	22	23	24	25	26	27	28	DC	Points
2024	Prema Racing	MIS; 1	MIS; 2	MIS; 3	IMO; 1	IMO; 2	IMO; 3	VLL; 1	VLL; 2	VLL; 3	MUG; 1	MUG; 2	MUG; 3	LEC; 1	LEC; 2	LEC; 3	CAT; 1; 19	CAT; 2; 25	CAT; 3; 18	MNZ; 1; 11	MNZ; 2 Ret	MNZ; 3; 24								30th	0
2025	Prema Racing	MIS1; 1; 22	MIS1; 2	MIS1; 3; 6	MIS1; 4; 8	VLL; 1; 17	VLL; 2	VLL; 3; 10	VLL; 4; 12	MNZ; 1; 33†	MNZ; 2 Ret	MNZ; 3 Ret	MUG; 1; 8	MUG; 2; 17	MUG; 3; 26	IMO; 1; 4	IMO; 2 C	**IMO**; **3**; 1	CAT; 1; 14	CAT; 2; 14	CAT; 3 C	MIS2; 1; 6	MIS2; 2	MIS2; 3; 4	MIS2; 4; 29	MIS2; 5; 3				10th	89
2026	Prema Racing	MIS1; 1; 2	MIS1; 2; 5	MIS1; 3	MIS1; 4; 9	VLL; 1; 11	VLL; 2	VLL; 3; 9	VLL; 4 Ret	MNZ; 1; 28†	MNZ; 2; 15	MNZ; 3	MNZ; 4 Ret	MUG1; 1	MUG1; 2; 4	MUG1; 3; 3	MUG1; 4; 4	IMO; 1	IMO; 2	IMO; 3	IMO; 4	MIS2; 1	MIS2; 2	MIS2; 3	MIS2; 4	MUG2; 1	MUG2; 2	MUG2; 3	MUG2; 4	18th	135

=== Complete F4 Middle East Championship / UAE4 Series results ===
(key) (Races in bold indicate pole position; races in italics indicate fastest lap)

Year	Team	1	2	3	4	5	6	7	8	9	10	11	12	13	14	15	DC	Points
2025	Prema Racing	YMC1; 1; 16	YMC1; 2 Ret	YMC1; 3; 11	YMC2; 1; 8	YMC2; 2; 7	YMC2; 3; 10	DUB; 1; 8	DUB; 2; 25	DUB; 3; 8	YMC3; 1; 6	YMC3; 2; 22	YMC3; 3; 6	LUS; 1; 12	LUS; 2; 11	LUS; 3; 22	12th	54
2026	Mumbai Falcons Racing Limited	**YMC1**; **1**; 1	YMC1; 2; 6	YMC1; 3; 2	YMC2; 1; 1	YMC2; 2; 10	**YMC2**; **3**; 1	DUB; 1; 2	DUB; 2; 4	DUB; 3; 1	LUS; 1; 2	LUS; 2; 7	LUS; 3; 5				1st	191

=== Complete E4 Championship results ===
(key) (Races in bold indicate pole position; races in italics indicate fastest lap)

Year	Team	1	2	3	4	5	6	7	8	9	DC	Points
2025	Prema Racing	LEC; 1; 6	LEC; 2; 7	LEC; 3; 7	MUG; 1; 8	MUG; 2; 11	MUG; 3; 17	MNZ; 1; 7	MNZ; 2; 11	MNZ; 3; 13	19th	30
2026	Prema Racing	VLL; 1; 5	VLL; 2; 7	VLL; 3; 4	LEC; 1; 27	LEC; 2; 12	LEC; 3; 4	MNZ; 1	MNZ; 2	MNZ; 3	8th	78

* Season still in progress.

=== Complete Formula Trophy results ===
(key) (Races in bold indicate pole position; races in italics indicate fastest lap)

Year	Team	1	2	3	4	5	6	7	DC	Points
2025	Mumbai Falcons Racing Limited	DUB; 1	DUB; 2	DUB; 3	**YMC1**; **1**; 1	**YMC1**; **2**; 1	YMC2; 1	YMC2; 2	8th	50

=== Complete Eurocup-3 results ===
(key) (Races in bold indicate pole position; races in italics indicate fastest lap)

Year	Team	1	2	3	4	5	6	7	8	9	10	11	12	13	14	15	16	17	18	19	DC	Points
2026	GRS Team	LEC; 1	LEC; SR	LEC; 2	POR; 1	POR; 2	IMO; 1	IMO; SR	IMO; 2	MNZ; 1 WD	MNZ; 2 WD	SIL; 1	SIL; 2	JER; 1	JER; SR	JER; 2	HUN; 1	HUN; 2	CAT; 1	CAT; 2	NC	0

=== Complete Formula Trophy Malaysia results ===
(key) (Races in bold indicate pole position; races in italics indicate fastest lap)

Year	Team	1	2	3	4	5	6	7	8	DC	Points
2026	LN4 Fusion	SEP1; 1	SEP1; 2	SEP2; 1; 4	SEP2; 2; 5	SEP2; 3; 4	SEP3; 1	SEP3; 2	SEP3; 3	TBD*	0*

=== Complete Formula Regional European Championship results ===
(key) (Races in bold indicate pole position) (Races in italics indicate fastest lap)

Year	Team	1	2	3	4	5	6	7	8	9	10	11	12	13	14	15	16	17	18	19	20	DC	Points
2026	Van Amersfoort Racing	RBR; 1	RBR; 2	RBR; 3	ZAN; 1	ZAN; 2	SPA; 1	SPA; 2	SPA; 3	MNZ; 1	MNZ; 2	MNZ; 3	HUN; 1	HUN; 2	LEC; 1	LEC; 2	IMO; 1; 10	IMO; 2; 2	**IMO**; **3**; 1	HOC; 1; 8	HOC; 2; 7	15th	47

=== Complete FIA F4 World Cup results ===
Year	Team	Qualifying	Quali Race	Main Race
2026	SJM Theodore Racing	8th	**2nd**	**2nd**

Sporting positions
Preceded by Emanuele Olivieri (F4 MEC)	UAE4 Series; Champion; 2026	Succeeded by Incumbent
