= LN4 Fusion =

British auto racing team

(United Kingdom) (Italy) LN4 Fusion
- Founded: 2026
- Founder(s): Lando Norris; Dan Richards; Dan Hazlewood
- Base: Veneto, Italy; Cambridgeshire, United Kingdom
- Team principal(s): Dan Richards (CEO); René Rosin (Team Principal); Dan Hazlewood (Team Principal, UK Operations)
- Current series: FIA Formula 2 Championship; FIA Formula 3 Championship; Formula Regional European Championship; Italian F4 Championship; F4 German Championship; F4 British Championship; Formula Trophy Malaysia
- Current drivers: FIA Formula 2 Championship: (Germany) Oliver Goethe; FIA Formula 3 Championship: (United States) James Egozi (Brazil) Gabriel Gomez (India) Dion Gowda; Formula Regional European Championship: (Brazil) Miguel Costa; F4 British Championship: TBA; F4 German Championship: TBA; Italian F4 Championship: (United Kingdom) Jesse Phillips; Formula Trophy Malaysia: (Ukraine) Oleksandr Bondarev (Canada) Lucas Nanji (United Kingdom) Jesse Phillips
- Website: ln4fusion.com

Alphabet Racing Italia S.R.L., competing as LN4 Fusion, is an auto racing team based in Italy and the United Kingdom. Co-founded by Formula One World Champion Lando Norris, the team started racing in late 2026 after acquiring selected assets of AIX Racing. Currently, LN4 Fusion is scheduled to compete in the FIA Formula 2 Championship, FIA Formula 3 Championship, Formula Regional European Championship, F4 British Championship, Italian F4 Championship and F4 German Championship.

== History ==
LN4 Fusion traces its origins back to the registration of Alphabet Racing Limited in Jersey on 28 January 2026, and Alphabet Racing Italia S.R.L. in Milan in March 2026. The former, which named Chris Phillips and Dan Richards as directors, purchased 50% of British karting team Fusion Motorsport, owned by Dan Hazlewood, on 31 January 2026. The latter was linked to a potential buyout of AIX Racing by former Prema Racing executives René Rosin and Guillaume Capietto in August 2026.

On 2 September 2026, Lando Norris co-founded LN4 Fusion together with Richards (CEO), Rosin (Team Principal), Hazlewood (Team Principal of UK Operations), and Capietto (Racing Director). The group acquired selected assets of AIX Racing and announced plans to compete in Formula 2, Formula 3, FREC, Italian F4, and the new German F4, as well as taking over Chris Dittmann Racing in British F4. LN4 Fusion signed its first driver in James Egozi for F3, and made its race debut in round two of Formula Trophy Malaysia on 6–8 November 2026. The team achieved its maiden race win in race 2 through rookie Jesse Phillips.

== LN4 Legacy Programme ==
Along with the announcement of his team, Norris launched the LN4 Legacy Programme, a driver development programme operated by ADD Management and aimed at helping young drivers financially on their way to Formula One.

== Current series results ==
=== Formula Trophy Malaysia ===
Year	Drivers	Races	Wins	Poles	F/Laps	Podiums	Points	D.C.	T.C.
2026	(Ukraine) Oleksandr Bondarev	3	0	0	0	0	34	TBD	TBD
2026	(Canada) Lucas Nanji	3	0	0	0	0	24	TBD	TBD
2026	(United Kingdom) Jesse Phillips	3	1	0	1	1	39	TBD	TBD

== Timeline ==
Current series
Formula Trophy Malaysia	2026
FIA Formula 2 Championship	2027–present
FIA Formula 3 Championship	2027–present
Formula Regional European Championship	2027–present
Italian F4 Championship	2027–present
F4 German Championship	2027–present
F4 British Championship	2027–present

== See also ==
- Fusion Formula E Team
