= 2026 Formula 4 South East Asia Championship =

Motorsport season

The 2026 Formula 4 South East Asia Championship was planned to be the seventh season of the Formula 4 South East Asia. On 22 June, it was announced that all rounds in the season were cancelled due to the cars being stranded in the Middle East and being unobtainable due to the 2026 Iran war.

== Teams and drivers ==
Team	No.	Driver	Class
(Australia) Evans GP	68	(Singapore) Rafael Vaessen	
(Australia) Evans GP	TBA	(Singapore) Kareen Kaur	
(Australia) Evans GP	TBA	(Vietnam) Ben Anh Nguyễn	

Icon	Legend
M	Drivers that compete for the Masters Championship
G	Guest drivers ineligible for Drivers' Championship
R	Rookie

== Scheduled race calendar ==
The schedule was planned to consist of 5 rounds. On 6 April, it was announced that the first round at Sepang will be postponed and the season will start at Buriram.

Round	Circuit	Date	Supporting
1	(Malaysia) Sepang International Circuit, Sepang	24–26 April	Lamborghini Super Trofeo Asia; Malaysia Touring Car Championship
2	(Thailand) Buriram International Circuit, Buriram	22–24 May	TSS The Super Series
3	(Thailand) Bangsaen Street Circuit, Mueang Chonburi	3–5 July	Porsche Carrera Cup Asia; TSS The Super Series
4	(Malaysia) Sepang International Circuit, Sepang	24–26 July	Malaysia Touring Car Championship
5	(Malaysia) Sepang International Circuit, Sepang	18–20 September	TSS The Super Series
