= Ginevra Panzeri =

Italian racing driver (born 2008)

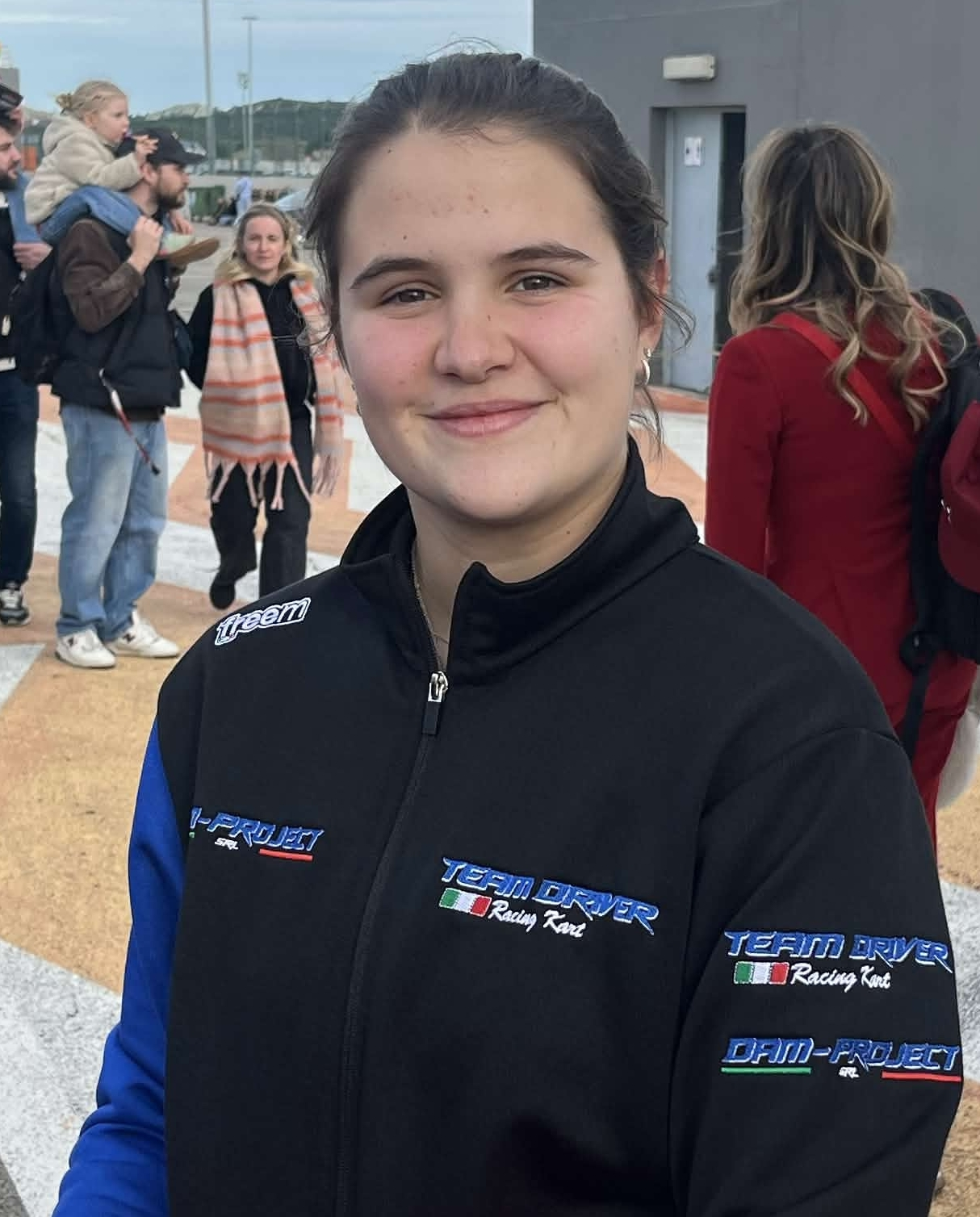
- Panzeri in 2026
- Nationality: (Italy) Italian
- Born: 2 October 2008 (age 18) Bergamo, Italy

Italian F4 Championship career
- Debut season: 2026
- Current team: Prema Racing
- Car number: 64
- Former teams: PA Racing
- Starts: 12
- Wins: 0
- Podiums: 0
- Poles: 0
- Fastest laps: 0
- Best finish: 54th in 2026

Previous series
- 2025–2026 2025–2026: E4 Championship; Formula Winter Series

Championship titles
- 2026: E4 Championship – Women's Trophy

Ginevra Panzeri (born 2 October 2008) is an Italian racing driver who last competed in the FFSA Academy centrally-run French F4 Championship, as well as part-time in the Formula 4 CEZ Championship and the Italian F4 Championship for PA Racing.

== Career ==
=== Karting and single-seater debut (2024–2025) ===
Born in Bergamo, Panzeri began driving karts at the age of five, primarily competing in amateur karting races, only making competitive appearances at the WSK Final Cup and the Trofeo Delle Industrie in 2024 and 2025, both times in the OK-N class. In late 2024, Panzeri began testing Formula 4 cars for AKM Motorsport, and remained with them through 2025 as she made her competitive single-seater debut in the final two rounds of the Formula Winter Series. Racing at Aragón and Barcelona, Panzeri took a best result of 17th in race three of the latter, as the Female Driver Trophy winner. Following that, Panzeri raced with the team in the E4 Championship, taking a best overall result of 20th in race three at Le Castellet, as well as a lone Female Trophy win at Mugello.

=== Rookie campaign in French F4 and large-scale programme in Europe (2026) ===
In 2026, Panzeri began the year driving for AS Motorsport in the Formula Winter Series, scoring her first points of her career with a ninth-place finish in race one at Estoril, as well as a Female Trophy win at Barcelona to end the season 29th in points. Following that, Panzeri moved over to the FFSA Academy centrally-run French F4 Championship for her first full season in a summer series. Her rookie campaign in the series was headlined by a stellar performance in the second round of the season at Dijon, Panzeri finished sixth and seventh in the first two races, but was not eligible to score points as she had raced in another series prior to the round.

During 2026, Panzeri also continued racing with AS Motorsport, joining their PA Racing-supported outfit to make select appearances in the Formula 4 CEZ, Italian F4 and E4 Championships. In the former, Panzeri took a best result of seventh at the Hungaroring to end the season 25th overall after partaking in three rounds. In Italian F4, Panzeri dabbled the season between PA and Prema Racing, whereas in E4, she scored overall points in race one at Monza, as well as winning the Female Trophy title.

== Karting record ==
=== Karting career summary ===
Season	Series	Team	Position
2024	WSK Final Cup — OK-N	AKM Motorsport	29th
2025	Trofeo Delle Industrie — OK-N	Team Driver Racing Kart	NC

== Racing record ==
=== Racing career summary ===
Season	Series	Team	Races	Wins	Poles	F/Laps	Podiums	Points	Position
2025	Formula Winter Series	AKM Motorsport	6	0	0	0	0	0	36th
2025	E4 Championship	AKM Motorsport	9	0	0	0	0	0	38th
2026	Formula Winter Series	AS Motorsport Olimpija	15	0	0	0	0	2	29th
2026	French F4 Championship	FFSA Academy	13	0	0	0	0	0	30th
2026	Formula 4 CEZ Championship	PA Racing by AS Motorsport	8	0	0	0	0	26	25th
2026	E4 Championship	PA Racing	6	0	0	0	0	6	33rd
2026	Italian F4 Championship	PA Racing	10	0	0	0	0	0	54th
2026	Italian F4 Championship	Prema Racing	2	0	0	0	0	0	54th
2026	Formula Trophy Malaysia	Evans GP Academy						*	*

* Season still in progress.

=== Complete Formula Winter Series results ===
(key) (Races in bold indicate pole position; races in italics indicate fastest lap)

Year	Entrant	1	2	3	4	5	6	7	8	9	10	11	12	13	14	15	Pos	Points
2025	AKM Motorsport	POR; 1	POR; 2	POR; 3	CRT; 1	CRT; 2	CRT; 3	ARA; 1; 19	ARA; 2; 25	ARA; 3; 24	CAT; 1; 22	CAT; 2 Ret	CAT; 3; 17				36th	0
2026	AS Motorsport Olimpija	EST; 1; 9	EST; 2; 24	EST; 3 Ret	POR; 1; 24	POR; 2; 29	POR; 3; 26	CRT; 1; 24	CRT; 2; 19	CRT; 3; 24	ARA; 1; 29	ARA; 2; 21	ARA; 3 Ret	CAT; 1; 19	CAT; 2; 18	CAT; 3; 22	29th	2

=== Complete E4 Championship results ===
(key) (Races in bold indicate pole position; races in italics indicate fastest lap)

Year	Team	1	2	3	4	5	6	7	8	9	DC	Points
2025	AKM Motorsport	LEC; 1; 22	LEC; 2; 25	LEC; 3; 20	MUG; 1; 21	MUG; 2; 34	MUG; 3; 26	MNZ; 1; 22	MNZ; 2; 21	MNZ; 3; 22	38th	0
2026	PA Racing	VLL; 1	VLL; 2	VLL; 3	LEC; 1; 33	LEC; 2; 32	LEC; 3; 29	MNZ; 1; 12	MNZ; 2; 21	MNZ; 3; 24	33rd	6

=== Complete French F4 Championship results ===
(key) (Races in bold indicate pole position; races in italics indicate fastest lap)

Year	1	2	3	4	5	6	7	8	9	10	11	12	13	14	15	16	17	18	DC	Points
2026	NOG; 1 Ret	NOG; 2 DNS	NOG; 3 DNS	DIJ; 1; 6	DIJ; 2; 7	DIJ; 3; 21	SPA; 1; 24	SPA; 2; 20	SPA; 3; 24	MAG; 1; 15	MAG; 2 Ret	MAG; 3 Ret	LÉD; 1; 15	LÉD; 2; 18	LÉD; 3 Ret	LEC; 1 WD	LEC; 2 WD	LEC; 3 WD	30th†	0

^{†} Ineligible to score points from round 2 after competing in another championship.

=== Complete Formula 4 CEZ Championship results ===
(key) (Races in bold indicate pole position) (Races in italics indicate fastest lap)

Year	Team	1	2	3	4	5	6	7	8	9	10	11	12	13	14	15	16	17	18	19	20	21	22	23	24	DC	Points
2026	PA Racing by AS Motorsport	RBR1; 1; 11	RBR1; 2; 12	RBR1; 3	RBR1; 4 Ret	SAL; 1; 13	SAL; 2; 18	SAL; 3	SAL; 4 C	SVK; 1	SVK; 2	SVK; 3	SVK; 4	MOS; 1	MOS; 2	MOS; 3	MOS; 4	BRN; 1	BRN; 2	BRN; 3	BRN; 4	HUN; 1; 19	HUN; 2; 7	HUN; 3	HUN; 4; 11	25th	26

=== Complete Italian F4 Championship results ===
(key) (Races in bold indicate pole position; races in italics indicate fastest lap)

Year	Team	1	2	3	4	5	6	7	8	9	10	11	12	13	14	15	16	17	18	19	20	21	22	23	24	25	26	27	28	DC	Points
2026	PA Racing	MIS1; 1; 20	MIS1; 2; 29	MIS1; 3	MIS1; 4 DNQ	VLL; 1; 24	VLL; 2	VLL; 3; 19	VLL; 4; 28	MNZ; 1	MNZ; 2	MNZ; 3	MNZ; 4	MUG1; 1	MUG1; 2; 27	MUG1; 3 Ret	MUG1; 4 DNQ	IMO; 1; 17	IMO; 2; 28	IMO; 3	IMO; 4; 28	MIS2; 1	MIS2; 2	MIS2; 3	MIS2; 4					54th	0
2026	Prema Racing																									MUG2; 1 Ret	MUG2; 2	MUG2; 3; 27	MUG2; 4 DNQ	54th	0

=== Complete Formula Trophy Malaysia results ===
(key) (Races in bold indicate pole position; races in italics indicate fastest lap)

Year	Team	1	2	3	4	5	6	7	8	DC	Points
2026	Evans GP Academy	SEP1; 1; 10	SEP1; 2; 9	SEP2; 1	SEP2; 2	SEP2; 3	SEP3; 1	SEP3; 2	SEP3; 3	TBD*	0*
