= Gabriel Gomez (racing driver) =

Brazilian racing driver (born 2006)

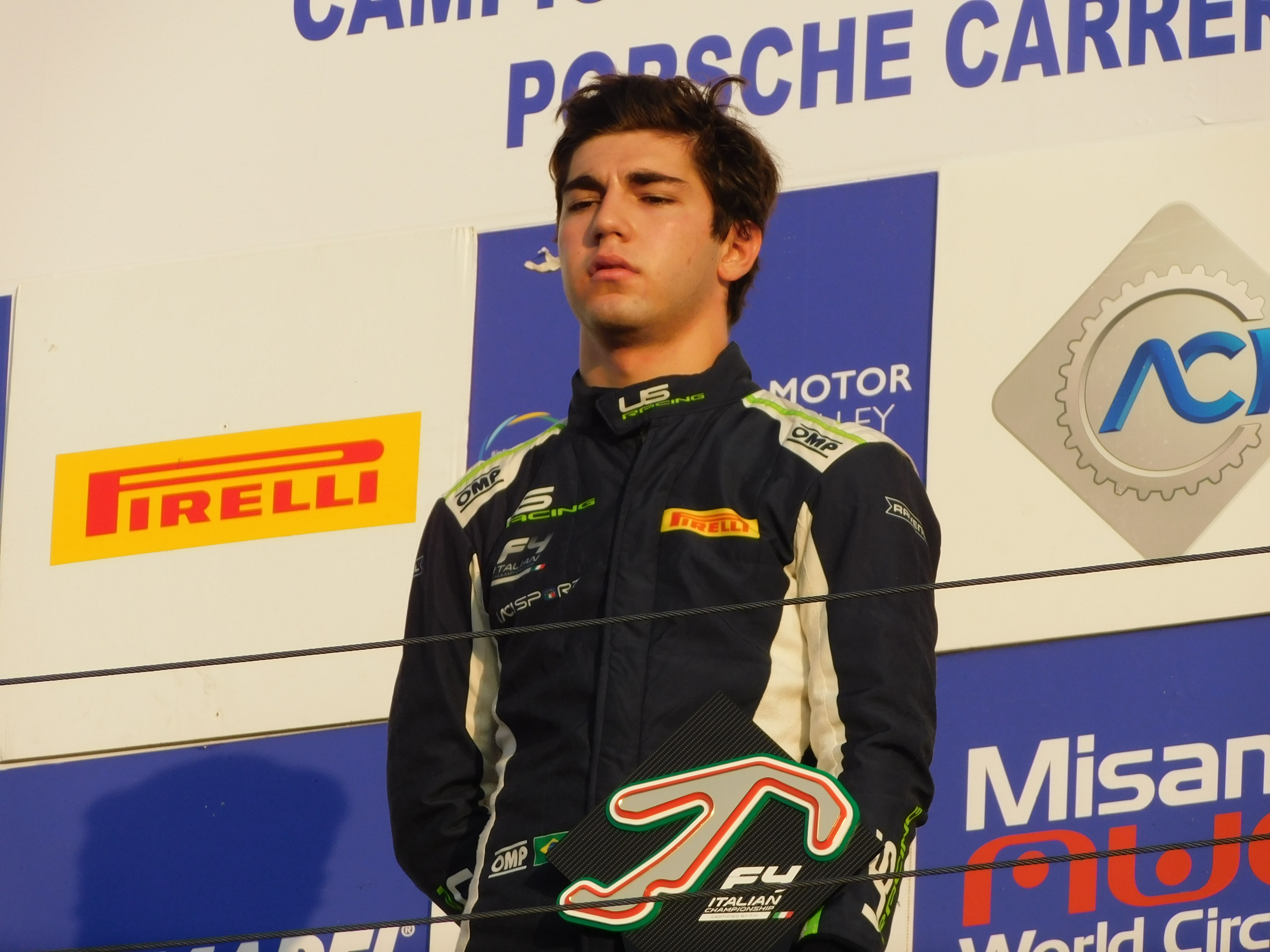
- Gomez in 2025
- Nationality: (Brazil) Brazilian
- Born: 18 September 2006 (age 20) Florianópolis, Brazil

Formula Regional European Championship career
- Debut season: 2026
- Car number: 78
- Former teams: Rodin Motorsport
- Starts: 19
- Wins: 0
- Podiums: 0
- Poles: 0
- Fastest laps: 0
- Best finish: 14th in 2026

Previous series
- 2026 2025 2025 2024–2025 2023–2024: FR European; Italian F4; Formula Winter Series; Euro 4 / E4; F4 Spanish

Championship titles
- 2025: Formula Winter Series
- Statistics up to date as of 17 October 2026.

Gabriel Gomez (born 18 September 2006) is a Brazilian racing driver who is set to compete in the FIA Formula 3 Championship for LN4 Fusion.

Gomez is the 2025 Formula Winter Series champion, and the 2025 Italian F4 and 2025 E4 runner-up. Following his Formula 4 successes, he joined Formula Regional Europe in 2026 with Rodin Motorsport.

== Career ==
=== Karting ===
Starting his karting career in Brazil, Gomez won the 2020 Brazilian Karting Championship in OKJ before moving to Europe in 2021. Making the step up to OK and driving for CRG, Gomez finished third in the 2022 WSK Open Cup and was runner-up in the 2023 and 2024 editions of the European Karting Championship.

=== Formula 4 ===
==== 2023 ====
Gomez made his Formula 4 debut for Cram Motorsport at the final round of the F4 Spanish Championship. Racing as a guest driver, Gomez finished 16th on debut.

==== 2024 ====
A week prior to the opening round of the season, TC Racing announced that Gomez would compete for them in the F4 Spanish Championship. Coming close to points on several occasions in the first half of the season, Gomez finished ninth in race one at Valencia, before taking his maiden rookie podium by finishing fourth in race two. Gomez also competed for PHM AIX Racing in the opening round of Euro 4. He scored a best result of twelfth in race two, coming close to a rookie podium, and finished ninth in the rookie standings.

==== 2025 ====
In early 2025, it was announced that Gomez would compete for US Racing full-time in Italian F4 and in select rounds of Formula Winter Series. In the opening round of Formula Winter Series at Algarve, Gomez qualified on pole for race one and took his first win in single-seaters after overtaking Leo Robinson on the final lap. Starting on pole for race two, Gomez held off Leo Robinson at the start and remained unchallenged after a safety car restart en route to his second win of the season. In race three, Gomez finished fourth on track but was promoted to third after Maxim Rehm was disqualified from all three races due to a technical infringement. At Valencia, Gomez opened up the weekend by qualifying on pole for all three races on Saturday, winning race one from pole on the same day and finishing third in race two on Sunday. In race three, Gomez finished runner-up to Leo Robinson after losing the lead to him at the start. In the penultimate round of the season at Aragon, Gomez finished on the podium in all three races to maintain his lead in the standings heading to Barcelona, where, despite a retirement in race one, he clinched the Formula Winter Series title with a race to spare by finishing fifth.

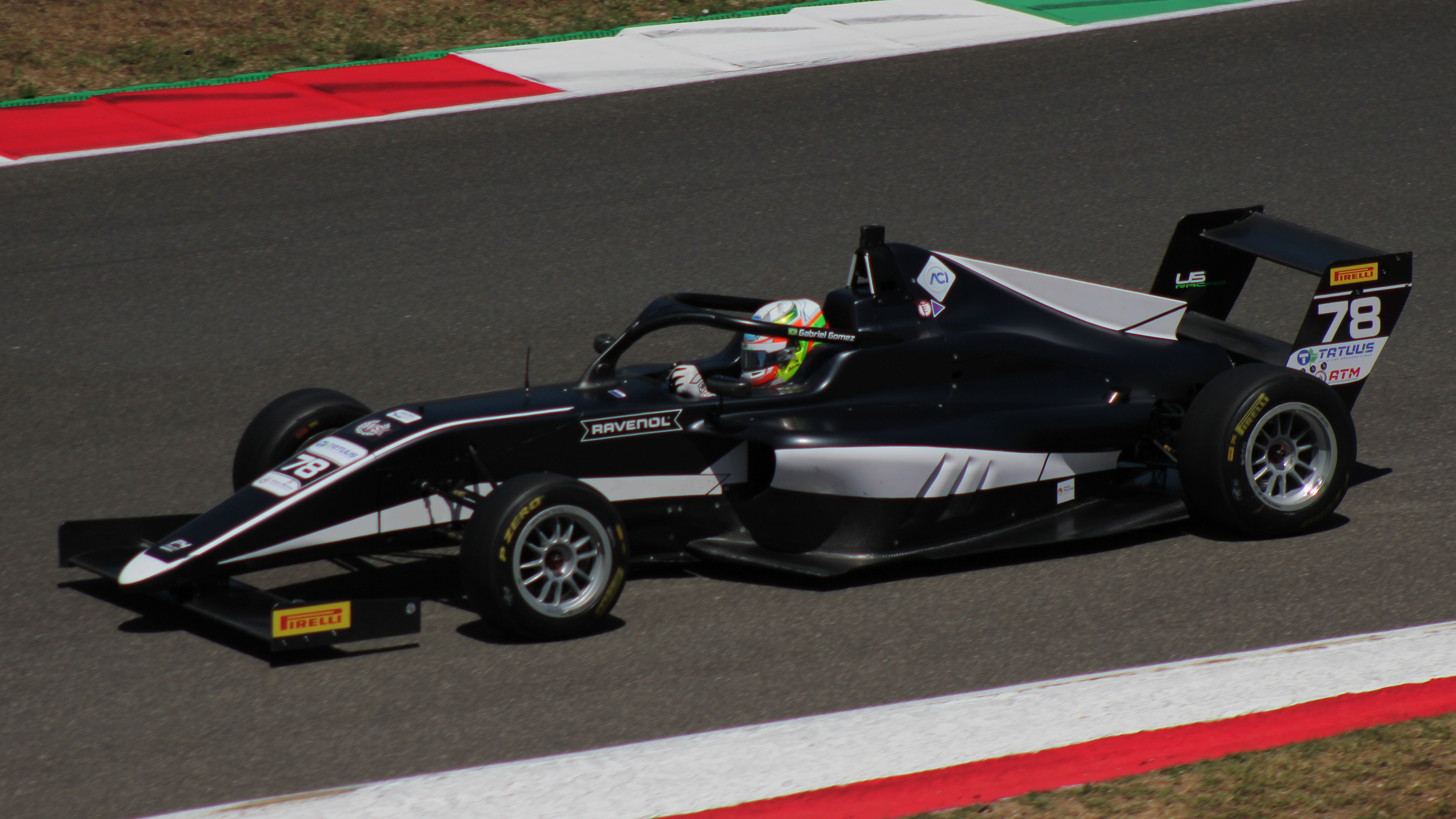
Gomez driving at the Mugello Circuit during the 2025 Italian F4 Championship

In Italian F4, Gomez began the year by scoring three podiums in the first five races and scoring his maiden win in race four at Vallelunga, before scoring three more podiums and taking his second win of the season in race one at Imola from pole position. Gomez then scored further wins at Barcelona and Misano to end the year runner-up in points to Kean Nakamura-Berta. Gomez also partook in the E4 Championship with the same team, winning twice at Le Castellet and scoring two more podiums to end the season runner-up in points.

=== Formula Regional ===
==== 2026 ====
After testing Formula Regional machinery in late 2025 for ART Grand Prix, Gomez joined Rodin Motorsport to race in the following year's Formula Regional European Championship. In his rookie season in the series, Gomez took a best result of fourth three times across the Monza and Le Castellet rounds as he rounded out the season 14th overall.

=== FIA Formula 3 ===
In October 2026, Gomez announced that he will move up to FIA Formula 3 in 2027 with new entrants LN4 Fusion.

== Karting record ==
=== Karting career summary ===
| Season | Series | Team | Position |
|---|---|---|---|
| 2012 | 15th Campeonato Sulbrasileiro de Kart — PMK/Mirim | | 8th |
| 2013 | 16º Campeonato Sulbrasileiro de Kart — PMK/Mirim | | 1st |
| 2019 | Skusa Supernationals — X30 Junior | | NC |
| 2019 | Brazilian Karting Championship — OKJ | | 2nd |
| 2020 | Brazilian Karting Championship — OKJ | | 1st |
| 2020 | Champions of the Future — OKJ | CRG S.R.L. | NC |
| 2020 | Karting World Championship — OKJ | CRG S.R.L. | 59th |
| 2021 | Champions of the Future — OK | CRG Racing Team | 52th |
| 2021 | Karting World Championship — OK | CRG Racing Team | 27th |
| 2022 | WSK Super Master Series — OK | CRG Racing Team | 27th |
| 2022 | Champions of the Future Winter Series — OK | CRG Racing Team | 14th |
| 2022 | Champions of the Future — OK (Note: Gomez competed for CRG Racing Team in rounds 1-2, 4 and ran as a Privateer in round 3.) | CRG Racing Team | 18th |
| 2022 | CIK-FIA European Championship — OK | CRG Racing Team | 13th |
| 2022 | Karting World Championship — OK | CRG Racing Team | 10th |
| 2022 | WSK Open Cup — OK | CRG Racing Team | 3rd |
| 2022 | Brazilian Karting Championship — OK | | 9th |
| 2022 | Italian Karting Championship — OK | | 1st |
| 2023 | WSK Super Master Series — OK | CRG Racing Team | 15th |
| 2023 | Champions of the Future — OK | CRG Racing Team | 5th |
| 2023 | CIK-FIA European Championship — OK | CRG Racing Team | 2nd |
| 2023 | WSK Euro Series — OK | CRG Racing Team | 13th |
| 2023 | Karting World Championship — OK | CRG Racing Team | 25th |
| 2023 | WSK Final Cup — KZ2 | CRG Racing Team | 6th |
| 2024 | WSK Super Master Series — OK | CRG Racing Team | 13th |
| 2024 | Champions of the Future — OK | CRG Racing Team | 4th |
| 2024 | CIK-FIA European Championship — OK | CRG Racing Team | 2nd |
| 2024 | Champions of the Future — KZ2 | CRG Racing Team | 26th |
| 2024 | Karting World Cup — KZ2 | CRG Racing Team | 14th |
| 2025 | 500 Milhas de Kart Granja Viana | TR3 Motors | |

== Racing record ==
=== Racing career summary ===
| Season | Series | Team | Races | Wins | Poles | F/Laps | Podiums | Points | Position |
|---|---|---|---|---|---|---|---|---|---|
| 2023 | F4 Spanish Championship | Cram Motorsport | 3 | 0 | 0 | 0 | 0 | 0 | NC† |
| 2024 | F4 Spanish Championship | TC Racing | 21 | 0 | 0 | 0 | 0 | 13 | 18th |
| 2024 | Euro 4 Championship | PHM AIX Racing | 3 | 0 | 0 | 0 | 0 | 0 | 26th |
| 2025 | Formula Winter Series | US Racing | 12 | 3 | 7 | 3 | 9 | 204 | **1st** |
| 2025 | Italian F4 Championship | US Racing | 20 | 4 | 4 | 2 | 11 | 267 | **2nd** |
| 2025 | E4 Championship | US Racing | 9 | 2 | 1 | 2 | 5 | 134 | **2nd** |
| 2026 | Formula Regional European Championship | Rodin Motorsport | 19 | 0 | 0 | 0 | 0 | 48 | 14th |
| 2027 | FIA Formula 3 Championship | LN4 Fusion | 0 | 0 | 0 | 0 | 0 | 0 | TBD |

^{*} Season still in progress.

^{†} As Gomez was a guest driver, he was ineligible to score points.

=== Complete F4 Spanish Championship results ===
(key) (Races in bold indicate pole position) (Races in italics indicate fastest lap)

| Year | Team | 1 | 2 | 3 | 4 | 5 | 6 | 7 | 8 | 9 | 10 | 11 | 12 | 13 | 14 | 15 | 16 | 17 | 18 | 19 | 20 | 21 | DC | Points |
|---|---|---|---|---|---|---|---|---|---|---|---|---|---|---|---|---|---|---|---|---|---|---|---|---|
| 2023 | Cram Motorsport | SPA; 1 | SPA; 2 | SPA; 3 | ARA; 1 | ARA; 2 | ARA; 3 | NAV; 1 | NAV; 2 | NAV; 3 | JER; 1 | JER; 2 | JER; 3 | EST; 1 | EST; 2 | EST; 3 | CRT; 1 | CRT; 2 | CRT; 3 | CAT; 1; 16 | CAT; 2; 25 | CAT; 3 Ret | NC† | 0 |
| 2024 | TC Racing | JAR; 1; 18 | JAR; 2; 13 | JAR; 3; 20 | POR; 1 Ret | POR; 2 Ret | POR; 3; 13 | LEC; 1; 23 | LEC; 2; 12 | LEC; 3; 11 | ARA; 1; 13 | ARA; 2; 27 | ARA; 3; 13 | CRT; 1; 9 | CRT; 2; 4 | CRT; 3; 14 | JER; 1; 27† | JER; 2; 27 | JER; 3; 10 | CAT; 1 Ret | CAT; 2; 11 | CAT; 3; 13 | 18th | 13 |

^{†} As Gomez was a guest driver, he was ineligible to score points.

=== Complete Euro 4 Championship / E4 Championship results ===
(key) (Races in bold indicate pole position; races in italics indicate fastest lap)

| Year | Team | 1 | 2 | 3 | 4 | 5 | 6 | 7 | 8 | 9 | DC | Points |
|---|---|---|---|---|---|---|---|---|---|---|---|---|
| 2024 | PHM AIX Racing | MUG; 1; 18 | MUG; 2; 12 | MUG; 3; 16 | RBR; 1 | RBR; 2 | RBR; 3 | MNZ; 1 | MNZ; 2 | MNZ; 3 | 26th | 0 |
| 2025 | US Racing | LEC; 1; 1 | LEC; 2; 2 | **LEC**; **3**; 1 | MUG; 1; 6 | MUG; 2; 5 | MUG; 3; 5 | MNZ; 1; 2 | MNZ; 2; 2 | MNZ; 3; 9 | 2nd | 134 |

=== Complete Formula Winter Series results ===
(key) (Races in bold indicate pole position) (Races in italics indicate fastest lap)

| Year | Team | 1 | 2 | 3 | 4 | 5 | 6 | 7 | 8 | 9 | 10 | 11 | 12 | DC | Points |
|---|---|---|---|---|---|---|---|---|---|---|---|---|---|---|---|
| 2025 | US Racing | **POR**; **1**; 1 | **POR**; **2**; 1 | POR; 3; 3 | **CRT**; **1**; 1 | **CRT**; **2**; 3 | **CRT**; **3**; 2 | **ARA**; **1**; 2 | **ARA**; **2**; 3 | ARA; 3; 3 | CAT; 1 Ret | CAT; 2; 5 | CAT; 3; 4 | 1st | 204 |

=== Complete Italian F4 Championship results ===
(key) (Races in bold indicate pole position; races in italics indicate fastest lap)

| Year | Team | 1 | 2 | 3 | 4 | 5 | 6 | 7 | 8 | 9 | 10 | 11 | 12 | 13 | 14 | 15 | 16 | 17 | 18 | 19 | 20 | 21 | 22 | 23 | 24 | 25 | DC | Points |
|---|---|---|---|---|---|---|---|---|---|---|---|---|---|---|---|---|---|---|---|---|---|---|---|---|---|---|---|---|
| 2025 | US Racing | MIS1; 1; 3 | MIS1; 2; 6 | MIS1; 3 | MIS1; 4; 35 | VLL; 1; 3 | VLL; 2; 3 | VLL; 3 | VLL; 4; 1 | MNZ; 1; 2 | MNZ; 2; 2 | MNZ; 3 Ret | MUG; 1; 2 | MUG; 2; 5 | MUG; 3; 4 | **IMO**; **1**; 1 | **IMO**; **2** C | IMO; 3; 4 | CAT; 1 Ret | CAT; 2; 1 | CAT; 3 C | MIS2; 1 | **MIS2**; **2** Ret | **MIS2**; **3**; 1 | MIS2; 4; 6 | **MIS2**; **5**; 2 | 2nd | 267 |

=== Complete Formula Regional European Championship results ===
(key) (Races in bold indicate pole position) (Races in italics indicate fastest lap)

| Year | Team | 1 | 2 | 3 | 4 | 5 | 6 | 7 | 8 | 9 | 10 | 11 | 12 | 13 | 14 | 15 | 16 | 17 | 18 | 19 | 20 | DC | Points |
|---|---|---|---|---|---|---|---|---|---|---|---|---|---|---|---|---|---|---|---|---|---|---|---|
| 2026 | Rodin Motorsport | RBR; 1 Ret | RBR; 2; 15 | RBR; 3; 7 | ZAN; 1; 11 | ZAN; 2; 21 | SPA; 1; 9 | SPA; 2 C | SPA; 3; 17 | MNZ; 1; 9 | MNZ; 2; 10 | MNZ; 3; 4 | HUN; 1; 24 | HUN; 2; 10 | LEC; 1; 4 | LEC; 2; 4 | IMO; 1; 13 | IMO; 2; 15 | IMO; 3 Ret | HOC; 1; 22 | HOC; 2; 18 | 14th | 48 |

=== Complete FIA Formula 3 Championship results ===
(key) (Races in bold indicate pole position) (Races in italics indicate fastest lap)

| Year | Entrant | 1 | 2 | 3 | 4 | 5 | 6 | 7 | 8 | 9 | 10 | 11 | 12 | 13 | 14 | 15 | 16 | 17 | 18 | 19 | 20 | DC | Points |
|---|---|---|---|---|---|---|---|---|---|---|---|---|---|---|---|---|---|---|---|---|---|---|---|
| 2027 | LN4 Fusion | BHR; SPR | BHR; FEA | JED; SPR | JED; FEA | MEL; SPR | MEL; FEA | MTL; SPR | MTL; FEA | MON; SPR | MON; FEA | SIL; SPR | SIL; FEA | RBR; SPR | RBR; FEA | MNZ; SPR | MNZ; FEA | MAD; SPR | MAD; FEA | IST; SPR | IST; FEA | TBD | TBD |
