= Cram Motorsport =

(Italy) Cram Motorsport
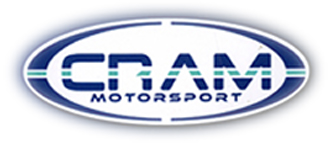
- Founded: 1994
- Founder(s): Simone Rosei; Gabriele Rosei
- Base: Erba, Como, Italy
- Current series: Italian F4 Championship; Formula 4 UAE Championship; F4 Spanish Championship; Formula Winter Series
- Former series: International Formula Master; Formula Renault 2.0 Italia; Formule Renault 2.0 Suisse; Formula Renault 3.5 Series; Formula Renault 2.0 Alps; Eurocup Formula Renault 2.0; Formula Abarth; Italian GT Championship
- Current drivers: Formula 4 (India) Kai Daryanani (Hungary) Adam Hideg (Brazil) Filippo Fiorentino
- Teams' Championships: Italian Formula Renault Championship; 2000 2002 2004 2006; International Formula Master; 2007; Formula Abarth; 2013
- Drivers' Championships: Italian Formula Renault Championship; 2000: Felipe Massa; 2002: José María López; 2004: Pastor Maldonado; Formula Renault 2000 Eurocup; 2000: Felipe Massa; 2003: Esteban Guerrieri; Formula Renault 2.0 Italy Winter Cup; 2001: Roberto Streit; 2002: Esteban Guerrieri; 2003: Pastor Maldonado; 2006: Jaime Alguersuari; International Formula Master; 2007:Jérôme d'Ambrosio; Formula Abarth; 2013: Alessio Rovera Formula 4 UAE Championship; 2021: Enzo Trulli
- Website: Official website

Cram Motorsport (formerly known as Cram Competition) is an auto racing team based in Italy.

Cram started in 1994 out of the Tatuus racing department. It has participated in Formula Alfa Boxer, Formula Renault 2000, Formula 3 Germany, Formula Master, Formula Renault World Series, Formula Abarth, Porsche Carrera Cup, Formula Renault 2.0 and FIA Formula 4.

== Current series results ==
=== F4 Spanish Championship ===
Year	Car	Drivers	Races	Wins	Poles	Fast Laps	Points	D.C.	T.C.
2022	Tatuus F4-T421	(Mexico) Ricardo Escotto	17	0	0	0	4	22nd	9th
2022	Tatuus F4-T421	(India) Anshul Gandhi	12	0	0	0	0	28th	9th
2022	Tatuus F4-T421	(Brazil) Nelson Neto	3	0	0	0	0	33rd	9th
2022	Tatuus F4-T421	(Australia) Gianmarco Pradel	3	0	0	0	0	NC	9th
2022	Tatuus F4-T421	(Argentina) Francisco Soldavini	3	0	0	0	0	NC	9th
2023	Tatuus F4-T421	(Italy) Flavio Olivieri	21	0	0	0	3	22nd	10th
2023	Tatuus F4-T421	(India) Kai Daryanani	9	0	0	0	0	35th	10th
2023	Tatuus F4-T421	(Italy) Alessandro Silvaggi	3	0	0	0	0	38th	10th
2023	Tatuus F4-T421	(Brazil) Filippo Fiorentino	6	0	0	0	0	NC	10th
2023	Tatuus F4-T421	(Brazil) Gabriel Gomez	3	0	0	0	0	NC	10th
2024	Tatuus F4-T421	(Hungary) Ádám Hideg	21	0	0	0	14	17th	8th
2024	Tatuus F4-T421	(Brazil) Filippo Fiorentino	18	0	0	0	0	34th	8th

=== Euro 4 Championship ===
Year	Car	Drivers	Races	Wins	Poles	Fast Laps	Points	D.C.	T.C.
2023	Tatuus F4-T421	(India) Kai Daryanani	3	0	0	0	0	27th	8th
2023	Tatuus F4-T421	(Italy) Flavio Olivieri	3	0	0	0	0	34th	8th
2024	Tatuus F4-T421	(United Kingdom) Kai Daryanani	3	0	0	0	0	33rd	11th
2025	Tatuus F4-T421	(Germany) Elia Weiss†	6	0	0	0	2	20th	12th
2025	Tatuus F4-T421	(Italy) Oscar Repetto	3	0	0	0	0	39th	12th

† Weiss drove for Jenzer Motorsport in round 3.

=== Formula Winter Series ===
Year	Car	Drivers	Races	Wins	Poles	Fast Laps	Points	D.C.	T.C
2024	Tatuus F4-T421	(Italy) Flavio Olivieri	11	0	0	0	8	23rd	8th
2024	Tatuus F4-T421	(Brazil) Filippo Fiorentino	11	0	0	0	0	34th	8th
2025	Tatuus F4-T421	(Poland) Aleksander Ruta†	12	0	0	1	2	22nd	9th
2025	Tatuus F4-T421	(Germany) Elia Weiss	6	0	0	0	0	29th	9th
2025	Tatuus F4-T421	(Australia) Aiva Anagnostiadis	3	0	0	0	0	42nd	9th
2025	Tatuus F4-T421	(Brazil) Ricardo Miranda Baptista	3	0	0	0	0	43rd	9th
2026	Tatuus F4-T421	(Switzerland) Samuel Ifrid	15	0	0	0	30	14th	6th
2026	Tatuus F4-T421	(Italy) Oscar Repetto	9	0	0	0	5	23rd	6th
2026	Tatuus F4-T421	(United States) Andre Rodriguez	15	0	0	0	4	26th	6th
2026	Tatuus F4-T421	(Switzerland) Maximilian Kammerlander	15	0	0	0	0	34th	6th
2026	Tatuus F4-T421	(Brazil) Alexandre Louza	6	0	0	0	0	43rd	6th

† Ruta drove for Van Amersfoort Racing in round 4.

=== Italian F4 Championship ===
Year	Car	Drivers	Races	Wins	Poles	Fast Laps	Points	D.C.	T.C.
2014	Tatuus F4-T014	(Italy) Mattia Drudi	21	4	1	5	237	2nd	8th
2014	Tatuus F4-T014	(Switzerland) Edi Haxhiu	21	0	0	0	32	14th	8th
2014	Tatuus F4-T014	(Russia) Robert Shwartzman	6	0	0	0	26	16th	8th
2014	Tatuus F4-T014	(Belgium) Max Defourny	3	0	0	0	9	20th	8th
2014	Tatuus F4-T014	(Italy) Giovanni Altoè	15	0	0	0	1	24th	8th
2016	Tatuus F4-T014	(Netherlands) Leonard Hoogenboom	21	0	0	0	20	23rd	12th
2016	Tatuus F4-T014	(Venezuela) Manuel Maldonado	19	0	0	0	0	36th	12th
2016	Tatuus F4-T014	(Russia) Aleksandr Vartanyan	3	0	0	0	0	39th	12th
2016	Tatuus F4-T014	(Qatar) Ahmad Al-Muhanadi	3	0	0	0	0	43rd	12th
2017	Tatuus F4-T014	(Czech Republic) Tom Beckhäuser	15	0	0	0	0	16th	7th
2017	Tatuus F4-T014	(Italy) Andrea Dell Accio	21	0	0	0	0	17th	7th
2017	Tatuus F4-T014	(Netherlands) Leonard Hoogenboom	6	0	0	0	5	NC	7th
2017	Tatuus F4-T014	(Italy) Mariano Lavigna	3	0	0	0	0	NC	7th
2017	Tatuus F4-T014	(Italy) Christian Cobellini	3	0	0	0	0	NC	7th
2018	Tatuus F4-T014	(Italy) Umberto Laganella	20	0	0	0	33	15th	8th
2018	Tatuus F4-T014	(Russia) Ilya Morozov	18	0	0	0	15	19th	8th
2018	Tatuus F4-T014	(Sweden) Daniel Vebster	6	0	0	0	0	32nd	8th
2018	Tatuus F4-T014	(Italy) Andrea Dell Accio	21	0	0	0	0	35th	8th
2018	Tatuus F4-T014	(Venezuela) Emilio Cipriani	21	0	0	0	0	36th	8th
2018	Tatuus F4-T014	(Italy) Francesco Garisto	6	0	0	0	0	44th	8th
2019	Tatuus F4-T014	(Israel) Roee Meyuhas	21	0	0	0	15	20th	10th
2019	Tatuus F4-T014	(Italy) Francesco Simonazzi	12	0	0	0	4	22nd	10th
2019	Tatuus F4-T014	(Sweden) Daniel Vebster	20	0	0	0	0	27th	10th
2019	Tatuus F4-T014	(Venezuela) Emilio Cipriani	21	0	0	1	0	30th	10th
2019	Tatuus F4-T014	(Brazil) Zezinho Muggiati	3	0	0	0	0	39th	10th
2020	Tatuus F4-T014	(Italy) Andrea Rosso	19	3	1	1	172	5th	4th
2020	Tatuus F4-T014	(Poland) Mateusz Kaprzyk	12	0	0	0	12	18th	4th
2020	Tatuus F4-T014	(Colombia) Nicolás Baptiste	5	0	0	0	1	27th	4th
2020	Tatuus F4-T014	(Greece) Georgis Markogiannis	6	0	0	0	0	32nd	4th
2020	Tatuus F4-T014	(Italy) Vittorio Catino	8	0	0	0	0	34th	4th
2021	Tatuus F4-T014	(Colombia) Nicolás Baptiste	21	0	0	0	14	25th	10th
2021	Tatuus F4-T014	(Italy) Vittorio Catino	9	0	0	0	2	30th	10th
2021	Tatuus F4-T014	(Greece) Georgis Markogiannis	15	0	0	0	0	38th	10th
2021	Tatuus F4-T014	(Australia) Marcos Flack	3	0	0	0	0	42nd	10th
2021	Tatuus F4-T014	(Italy) Rocco Mazzola	3	0	0	0	0	43rd	10th
2021	Tatuus F4-T014	(Morocco) Suleiman Zanfari	3	0	0	0	0	44th	10th
2022	Tatuus F4-T421	(Greece) Georgis Markogiannis	14	0	0	0	0	38th	13th
2022	Tatuus F4-T421	(Mexico) Ricardo Escotto	6	0	0	0	0	47th	13th
2022	Tatuus F4-T421	(Brazil) Nelson Neto	3	0	0	0	0	53rd	13th
2022	Tatuus F4-T421	(Brazil) Nicholas Monteiro	6	0	0	0	0	54th	13th
2024	Tatuus F4-T421	(United Kingdom) Kai Daryanani	12	0	0	0	0	31st	10th
2024	Tatuus F4-T421	(Brazil) Filippo Fiorentino	9	0	0	0	0	36th	10th
2024	Tatuus F4-T421	(Portugal) Francisco Macedo	3	0	0	0	0	43rd	10th
2025	Tatuus F4-T421	(Germany) Elia Weiss	19	0	0	0	0	35th	10th
2025	Tatuus F4-T421	(Italy) Oscar Repetto	3	0	0	0	0	43rd	10th
2025	Tatuus F4-T421	(United States) Andre Rodriguez	7	0	0	0	0	51st	10th
2026	Tatuus F4-T421	(Brazil) Rafaela Ferreira							
2026	Tatuus F4-T421	(India) Eshan Naraayanan							
2026	Tatuus F4-T421	(United States) Andre Rodriguez							
2026	Tatuus F4-T421	(United Kingdom) Roman Kamyab							
2026	Tatuus F4-T421	(Germany) Simon Rechenmacher							

=== Formula 4 CEZ Championship ===
Year	Car	Drivers	Races	Wins	Poles	Fast Laps	Points	D.C.	T.C.
2026	Tatuus F4-T421	(Germany) Simon Rechenmacher							
2026	Tatuus F4-T421	(Brazil) Alexandre Louza							
2026	Tatuus F4-T421	(Bulgaria) Lyuboslav Ruykov							
2026	Tatuus F4-T421	(United States) Payton Westcott							
2026	Tatuus F4-T421	(Netherlands) Felipe Reijs							
2026	Tatuus F4-T421	(Sweden) Leo Nilsson							
2026	Tatuus F4-T421	(Brazil) Vicky Farfus							

== Former Series Results ==
=== Italian GT Championship - GT4 Am ===
Year	Car	No.	Drivers	Races	Wins	Poles	Fast Laps	Points	D.C.
2020	Porsche 718 Cayman GT4 Clubsport	299	(Australia) Daniel Vebster (Italy) Giancomo Riva	8	2	0	0	97	1st
2020	Porsche 718 Cayman GT4 Clubsport	297	(Netherlands) Christian de Kant (Italy) Francesco Fenici	2	0	0	0	27	7th
2020	Porsche 718 Cayman GT4 Clubsport	297	(Switzerland) Ariano Pan (Italy) Matteo Arrigosi	2	0	0	0	18	8th

=== Formula 4 UAE Championship ===
Year	Car	Drivers	Races	Wins	Poles	Fast Laps	Points	D.C.	T.C.
2017-18	Tatuus F4-T014	(Czech Republic) Tom Beckhäuser	22	1	1	0	262	3rd	4th
2019	Tatuus F4-T014	(Poland) Filip Kaminiarz	20	0	0	0	102	9th	4th
2021	Tatuus F4-T014	(Italy) Enzo Trulli	19	4	0	5	319	1st	2nd
2021	Tatuus F4-T014	(United States) Enzo Scionti	20	0	0	0	43	13th	2nd
2022	Tatuus F4-T421	(Mexico) Ricardo Escotto	20	0	0	0	0	25th	10th
2022	Tatuus F4-T421	(India) Anshul Gandhi	20	0	0	0	0	32nd	10th
2023	Tatuus F4-T421	(United Arab Emirates) Sebastian Murray	15	0	0	0	0	30th	13th
2023	Tatuus F4-T421	(Italy) Flavio Olivieri	15	0	0	0	0	38th	13th

== Timeline ==
Current series
Italian F4 Championship	2014, 2016–2022, 2024–present
F4 Spanish Championship	2022–present
Euro 4 Championship	2023–present
Formula Winter Series	2024–present
Formula 4 CEZ Championship	2026–present
Former series
Eurocup Formula Renault 2.0	1996–2007, 2010–2011, 2015–2016
Italian Formula Renault Championship	2000–2009
German Formula Three Championship	2001
Formula Renault 3.5 Series	2005–2007
International Formula Master	2007–2009
Formule Renault 2.0 Alps	2008–2009, 2011–2012, 2014–2015
Formula Renault 2.0 UK Championship	2010
Formula Renault Northern European Cup	2010–2011, 2016, 2018
Formula Abarth	2010–2013
Porsche Carrera Cup Italy	2012
Formula 4 UAE Championship	2017–2019, 2021–2023
ADAC Formula 4	2019
Italian GT Championship	2020
