= Javier Herrera =

Mexican racing driver (born 2009)

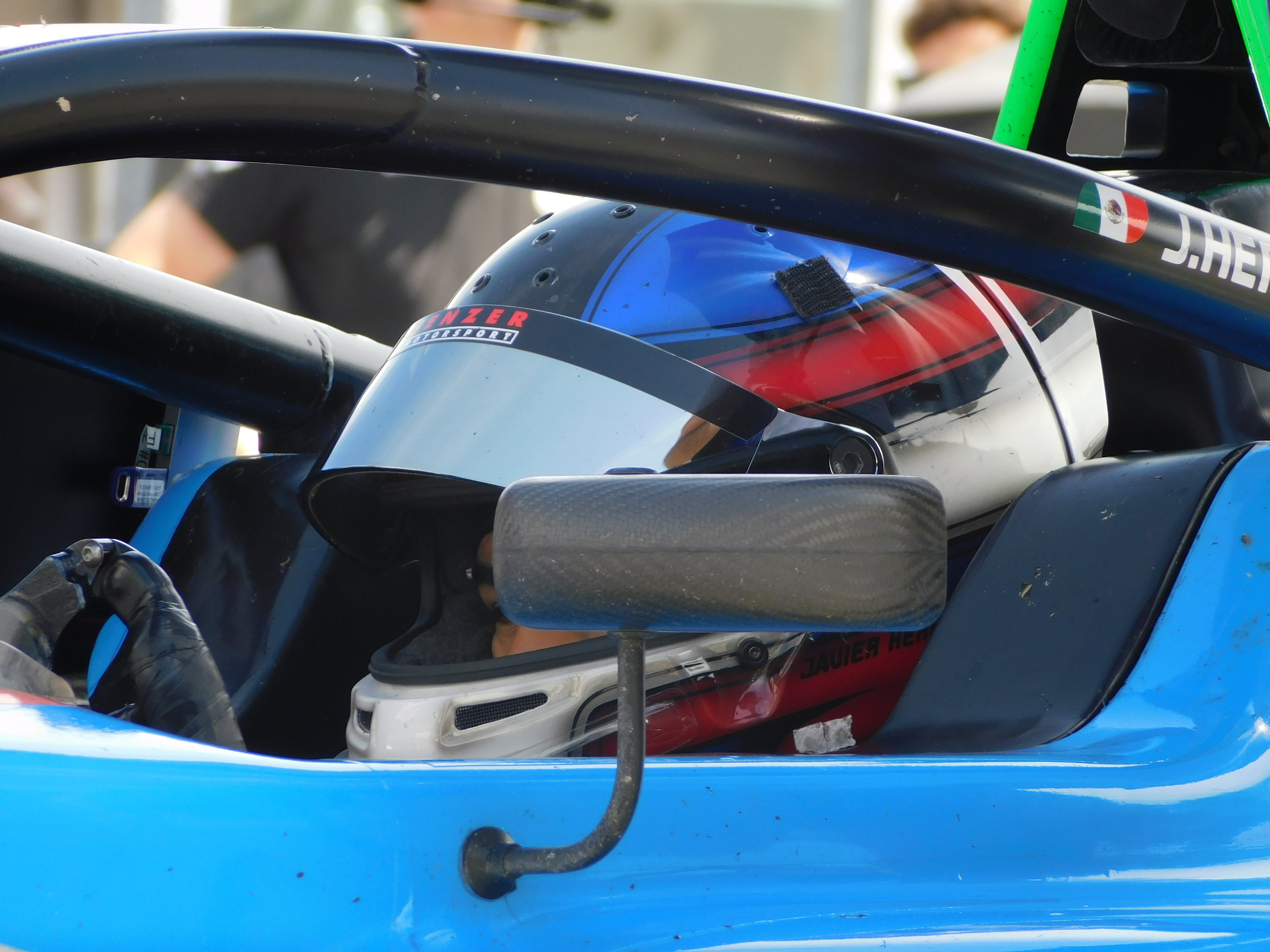
- Herrera in 2025
- Nationality: (Mexico) Mexican
- Born: 3 November 2009 (age 17) Monterrey, Mexico

Euroformula Open Championship career
- Debut season: 2026
- Current team: BVM Racing

Previous series
- 2025 2025 2025: E4 Championship; Formula 4 CEZ Championship; Italian F4 Championship
- Statistics up to date as of 18 February 2026.

Javier Herrera (born 3 November 2009) is a Mexican racing driver who last competed in the Euroformula Open Championship for BVM Racing.

== Career ==
Herrera began karting in 2017. Mainly racing in Mexico, he won the 2020 and 2022 RMC Mexico titles in Micro Swift and Junior Max, and finished third in the 2022 Mexican SKUSA championship in the X30 Junior class. Herrera then mainly raced in Europe in 2023, before going back to America for the end of the year, where he finished 11th in the SKUSA SuperNationals and continued karting until 2024.

After testing Formula 4 machinery in late 2024, Herrera made his single-seater debut for Jenzer Motorsport in the final round of the 2025 Formula Winter Series at Barcelona. Despite qualifying ninth in wet conditions on debut, Herrera scored a best result of 19th among the three races, doing so in race two. Continuing with the Swiss team for the rest of the year, Herrera joined the Formula 4 CEZ Championship, in which he scored two fifth-place finishes in the season-opening Red Bull Ring round. After finishing no higher than eighth at the same venue a month later, Herrera finished fourth in race one at the Salzburgring to enter the second half of the year eighth in points. In the following round at Most, Herrera scored his first win of the season during race three after overtaking two drivers during a safety car restart. After then finishing second in race three at the Slovakia Ring, Herrera won races one and two during the Brno Circuit round after starting on pole position for both races. He finished the season in third with 189 points. During 2025, Herrera also partook in the Monza and Imola rounds of the Italian F4 Championship, in which he scored a best result of tenth in race three at Monza, having started 23rd. Herrera also made a one-off appearance in the Mugello round of the E4 Championship for AKM Motorsport, in which he scored a best result of 19th in race one.

The following year, Herrera joined BVM Racing to step up to the Euroformula Open Championship. After starting off the season with podiums at Spa, Herrera took his only win of the season from pole at Misano, as well as additional podiums at Le Castellet and Monza to take sixth in overall points.

== Karting record ==
=== Karting career summary ===
Season	Series	Team	Position
2017	RMC Mexico North West – Micro Max		8th
2018	SKUSA SuperNationals – Micro Swift	Maranello Kart	37th
2019	RMC Mexico North West – Micro Max		NC
2021	SKUSA SuperNationals – Micro Swift		NC
2022	IAME Euro Series – X30 Junior	Falcon Racing Team	82nd
2022	IAME Warriors Final – X30 Junior	Falcon Racing Team	NC
2022	Rotax Max Challenge Grand Finals – Junior Max	Taylor Greenfield	NC
2022	USPKS – X30 Pro Junior		32nd
2023	Champions of the Future – OK-J	Falcon Racing Team; CRG Racing Team (Note: Herrera competed for Falcon Racing Team in rounds 1–2 before switching to CRG Racing Team for rounds 3–4.)	55th
2023	Karting European Championship – OK-J	Falcon Racing Team; CRG Racing Team (Note: Herrera competed for Falcon Racing Team in round 1 before switching to CRG Racing Team for rounds 3–4.)	67th
2023	USPKS – KA 100 Junior		41st
2023	SKUSA SuperNationals – KA 100 Junior	Orolson Racing	11th
2024	USPKS – KA 100 Senior	CRG Nordam	36th

== Racing record ==
=== Racing career summary ===
Season	Series	Team	Races	Wins	Poles	F/Laps	Podiums	Points	Position
2025	Formula Winter Series	Jenzer Motorsport	3	0	0	0	0	0	NC†
2025	Formula 4 CEZ Championship	Jenzer Motorsport	18	3	1	1	4	189	**3rd**
2025	Italian F4 Championship	Jenzer Motorsport	4	0	0	0	0	1	28th
2025	E4 Championship	AKM Motorsport	3	0	0	0	0	0	37th
2026	Euroformula Open Championship	BVM Racing	23	1	2	3	5	207	6th

^{†} As Herrera was a guest driver, he was ineligible to score points.

=== Complete Formula Winter Series results ===
(key) (Races in bold indicate pole position) (Races in italics indicate fastest lap)

Year	Team	1	2	3	4	5	6	7	8	9	10	11	12	DC	Points
2025	Jenzer Motorsport	POR; 1	POR; 2	POR; 3	CRT; 1	CRT; 2	CRT; 3	ARA; 1	ARA; 2	ARA; 3	CAT; 1; 25‡	CAT; 2; 19	CAT; 3; 21	NC†	0

^{†} As Herrera was a guest driver, he was ineligible to score points.

^{‡} Herrera did not finish, but was classified as he completed 90% race distance.

=== Complete Formula 4 CEZ Championship results ===
(key) (Races in bold indicate pole position) (Races in italics indicate fastest lap)

Year	Team	1	2	3	4	5	6	7	8	9	10	11	12	13	14	15	16	17	18	DC	Points
2025	Jenzer Motorsport	RBR1; 1; 5	RBR1; 2; 6	RBR1; 3; 5	RBR2; 1; 16	RBR2; 2 Ret	RBR2; 3; 8	SAL; 1; 4	SAL; 2; 14	SAL; 3; 15†	MOS; 1; 4	MOS; 2; 4	MOS; 3; 1	SVK; 1; 7	SVK; 2; 5	SVK; 3; 2	**BRN**; **1**; 1	BRN; 2; 1	BRN; 3; 4	3rd	189

^{†} Herrera did not finish, but was classified as he completed 90% race distance.

=== Complete Italian F4 Championship results ===
(key) (Races in bold indicate pole position; races in italics indicate fastest lap)

Year	Team	1	2	3	4	5	6	7	8	9	10	11	12	13	14	15	16	17	18	19	20	21	22	23	24	25	DC	Points
2025	Jenzer Motorsport	MIS1; 1	MIS1; 2	MIS1; 3	MIS1; 4	VLL; 1	VLL; 2	VLL; 3	VLL; 4	MNZ; 1; 29	MNZ; 2; 19	MNZ; 3; 10	MUG; 1	MUG; 2	MUG; 3	IMO; 1 Ret	IMO; 2 C	IMO; 3 WD	CAT; 1	CAT; 2	CAT; 3	MIS2; 1	MIS2; 2	MIS2; 3	MIS2; 4	MIS2; 5	28th	1

=== Complete E4 Championship results ===
(key) (Races in bold indicate pole position; races in italics indicate fastest lap)

Year	Team	1	2	3	4	5	6	7	8	9	DC	Points
2025	AKM Motorsport	LEC; 1	LEC; 2	LEC; 3	MUG; 1; 19	MUG; 2; 25	MUG; 3; 24	MNZ; 1	MNZ; 2	MNZ; 3	37th	0

=== Complete Euroformula Open Championship results ===
(key) (Races in bold indicate pole position) (Races in italics indicate fastest lap)

Year	Entrant	1	2	3	4	5	6	7	8	9	10	11	12	13	14	15	16	17	18	19	20	21	22	23	24	DC	Points
2026	BVM Racing	PRT; 1; 8	PRT; 2 (11)	PRT; 3; 6	SPA; 1; 3	SPA; 2; 2	SPA; 3; 9	**MIS**; **1**; 1	MIS; 2; 10	MIS; 3; 4	**HUN**; **1**; 4	HUN; 2; 4	HUN; 3; 6	LEC; 1; 5	LEC; 2; 3	LEC; 3; 5	HOC; 1 (DNS)	HOC; 2; 4	HOC; 3 DSQ	MNZ; 1; 2	MNZ; 2 (Ret)	MNZ; 3; 8	CAT; 1; 8	CAT; 2; 6	CAT; 3; 9	6th	207

* Season still in progress.
