= Aleksander Ruta =

Polish racing driver (born 2008)

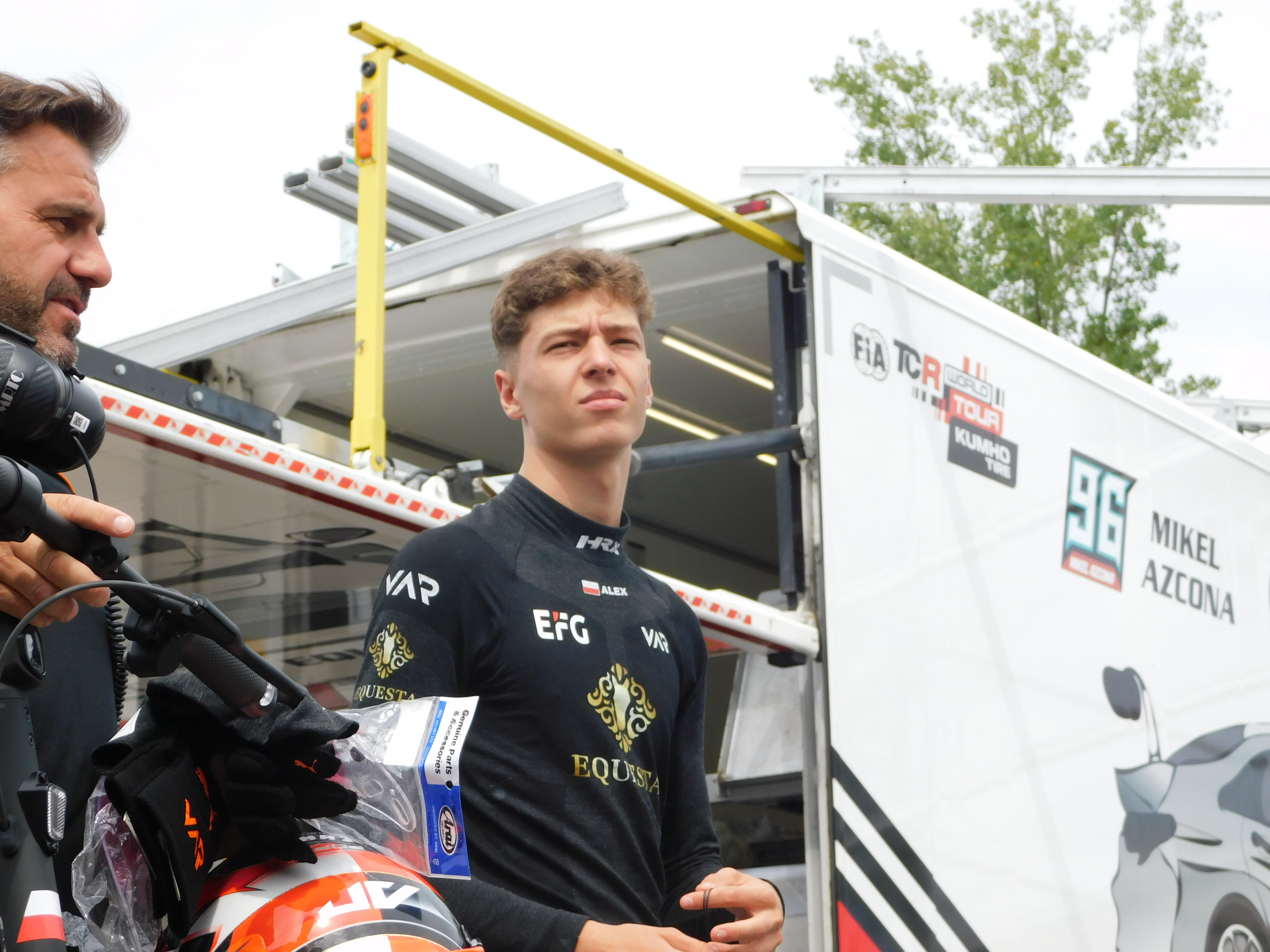
- Ruta in 2025
- Nationality: (Poland) Polish
- Born: 6 August 2008 (age 18) Warsaw, Poland

Italian F4 Championship career
- Debut season: 2025
- Current team: Van Amersfoort Racing
- Car number: 3
- Starts: 41
- Wins: 0
- Podiums: 1
- Poles: 0
- Fastest laps: 1
- Best finish: 11th in 2026

Previous series
- 2025–2026 2025–2026: Euro 4 Formula Winter Series

Aleksander Ruta (born 6 August 2008) is a Polish racing driver who last competed for Van Amersfoort Racing in the Italian F4 and E4 Championships.

== Career ==
=== Karting (2022–2024) ===
Ruta began karting in 2022, competing until 2024. During his short karting career, Ruta most notably finished second in the 2024 Rok Cup Poland's Senior Rok standings, and also participated in the 2023 Rok Cup Superfinal, also in Senior Rok.

=== Formula 4 (2025–present) ===
==== 2025 ====
In early 2025, Ruta made his single-seater debut by joining Cram Motorsport to race in the Formula Winter Series. After scoring his first points in race one at Aragón by finishing tenth, Ruta switched to Van Amersfoort Racing for the season finale, where he scored points again by finishing 11th in race one, en route to a 21st-place points finish. Despite being set to race in Italian F4 for Cram, Ruta elected to continue with VAR to race in the series, as he started off the season with seventh- and eighth-place finishes in races three and four in round two at Vallelunga, as well as a rookie podium in the former. Ruta then scored two points finishes between the Mugello and Barcelona rounds, before ending the season with a pair of ninth-place finishes at Misano to end the year 23rd in the overall standings. During 2025, Ruta also raced with the team in the E4 Championship, in which he scored four rookie podiums between the Le Castellet and Mugello rounds, including a best overall result of seventh in the latter's race one to take 13th in points.

==== 2026 ====
Remaining with Van Amersfoort Racing for 2026, Ruta raced with them for a triple campaign in the Formula Winter Series, Italian F4 and E4 Championships. In the Winter Series, Ruta began the year by scoring points four times across the Estoril and Algarve rounds, before finishing on the podium in all three races at Valencia, which included his first-ever career win in race two. Ruta then finished tenth in race one in the following round at Aragón, before skipping the remaining two races and the season-ending Barcelona round after injuring his hand in said race. In Italian F4, Ruta was 11th in overall points with a best result of second at Imola, while in E4, he took a lone podium at Monza to end the season seventh overall.

== Karting record ==
=== Karting career summary ===
| Season | Series | Team | Position |
|---|---|---|---|
| 2023 | IAME Winter Cup — X30 Senior | Pantano Racing Team | 86th |
| 2023 | IAME Euro Series — X30 Senior | Pantano Racing Team | 76th |
| 2023 | Rok Cup Superfinal — Senior Rok | Motorsport Solutions | NC |
| 2024 | IAME Winter Cup — X30 Senior | Pantano Racing Team | NC |
| 2024 | IAME Euro Series — X30 Senior | Pantano Racing Team | 162nd |
| 2024 | Rok Cup Poland — Senior Rok | | 2nd |

== Racing record ==
=== Career summary ===
| Season | Series | Team | Races | Wins | Poles | F/Laps | Podiums | Points | Position |
|---|---|---|---|---|---|---|---|---|---|
| 2025 | Formula Winter Series | Cram Motorsport | 9 | 0 | 0 | 0 | 0 | 3 | 21st |
| 2025 | Formula Winter Series | Van Amersfoort Racing | 3 | 0 | 0 | 1 | 0 | 3 | 21st |
| 2025 | Italian F4 Championship | Van Amersfoort Racing | 20 | 0 | 0 | 0 | 0 | 17 | 23rd |
| 2025 | E4 Championship | Van Amersfoort Racing | 9 | 0 | 0 | 0 | 0 | 11 | 13th |
| 2026 | Formula Winter Series | Van Amersfoort Racing | 10 | 1 | 0 | 0 | 3 | 93 | 6th |
| 2026 | Italian F4 Championship | Van Amersfoort Racing | 21 | 0 | 0 | 1 | 1 | 193 | 11th |
| 2026 | E4 Championship | Van Amersfoort Racing | 9 | 0 | 0 | 0 | 1 | 81 | 7th |

* Season still in progress.

=== Complete Formula Winter Series results ===
(key) (Races in bold indicate pole position) (Races in italics indicate fastest lap)

| Year | Team | 1 | 2 | 3 | 4 | 5 | 6 | 7 | 8 | 9 | 10 | 11 | 12 | 13 | 14 | 15 | DC | Points |
|---|---|---|---|---|---|---|---|---|---|---|---|---|---|---|---|---|---|---|
| 2025 | Cram Motorsport | POR; 1; 22 | POR; 2 Ret | POR; 3; 17 | CRT; 1 Ret | CRT; 2; 23 | CRT; 3; 28† | ARA; 1; 10 | ARA; 2; 22 | ARA; 3; 15 | | | | | | | 21st | 3 |
| 2025 | Van Amersfoort Racing | | | | | | | | | | CAT; 1; 11 | CAT; 2; 16 | CAT; 3; 22 | | | | 21st | 3 |
| 2026 | Van Amersfoort Racing | EST; 1; 27 | EST; 2; 6 | EST; 3; 25 | POR; 1; 6 | POR; 2; 6 | POR; 3; 5 | CRT; 1; 3 | CRT; 2; 1 | CRT; 3; 2 | ARA; 1; 10 | ARA; 2 DNS | ARA; 3 DNS | CAT; 1 | CAT; 2 | CAT; 3 | 6th | 93 |

=== Complete Italian F4 Championship results ===
(key) (Races in bold indicate pole position; races in italics indicate fastest lap)

| Year | Team | 1 | 2 | 3 | 4 | 5 | 6 | 7 | 8 | 9 | 10 | 11 | 12 | 13 | 14 | 15 | 16 | 17 | 18 | 19 | 20 | 21 | 22 | 23 | 24 | 25 | 26 | 27 | 28 | DC | Points |
|---|---|---|---|---|---|---|---|---|---|---|---|---|---|---|---|---|---|---|---|---|---|---|---|---|---|---|---|---|---|---|---|
| 2025 | Van Amersfoort Racing | MIS1; 1; 23 | MIS1; 2 | MIS1; 3; 12 | MIS1; 4; 31 | VLL; 1; 18 | VLL; 2 | VLL; 3; 7 | VLL; 4; 8 | MNZ; 1 Ret | MNZ; 2; 11 | MNZ; 3; 33† | MUG; 1; 31 | MUG; 2; 20 | MUG; 3; 9 | IMO; 1; 21 | IMO; 2 C | IMO; 3 Ret | CAT; 1; 12 | CAT; 2; 10 | CAT; 3 C | MIS2; 1; 9 | MIS2; 2; 9 | MIS2; 3 | MIS2; 4; 20 | MIS2; 5; 13 | | | | 23rd | 17 |
| 2026 | Van Amersfoort Racing | MIS1; 1 | MIS1; 2; 19 | MIS1; 3; 11 | MIS1; 4; 11 | VLL; 1; 16 | VLL; 2 | VLL; 3 Ret | VLL; 4; 20 | MNZ; 1; 30† | MNZ; 2 | MNZ; 3; 8 | MNZ; 4; 11 | MUG1; 1; 10 | MUG1; 2; 11 | MUG1; 3 | MUG1; 4 Ret | IMO; 1 | IMO; 2; 2 | IMO; 3; 9 | IMO; 4; 5 | MIS2; 1; 5 | MIS2; 2; 7 | MIS2; 3 | MIS2; 4; 5 | MUG2; 1; 12 | MUG2; 2; 6 | MUG2; 3 | MUG2; 4; 7 | 11th | 193 |

=== Complete E4 Championship results ===
(key) (Races in bold indicate pole position; races in italics indicate fastest lap)

| Year | Team | 1 | 2 | 3 | 4 | 5 | 6 | 7 | 8 | 9 | DC | Points |
|---|---|---|---|---|---|---|---|---|---|---|---|---|
| 2025 | Van Amersfoort Racing | LEC; 1; 9 | LEC; 2; 18 | LEC; 3; 10 | MUG; 1; 7 | MUG; 2; 12 | MUG; 3; 9 | MNZ; 1 Ret | MNZ; 2; 26 | MNZ; 3 Ret | 13th | 11 |
| 2026 | Van Amersfoort Racing | VLL; 1; 20 | VLL; 2; 12 | VLL; 3; 31† | LEC; 1; 9 | LEC; 2; 17 | LEC; 3; 10 | MNZ; 1; 3 | MNZ; 2; 6 | MNZ; 3; 5 | 7th | 81 |
