= Andrija Kostić =

Serbian racing driver (born 2009)

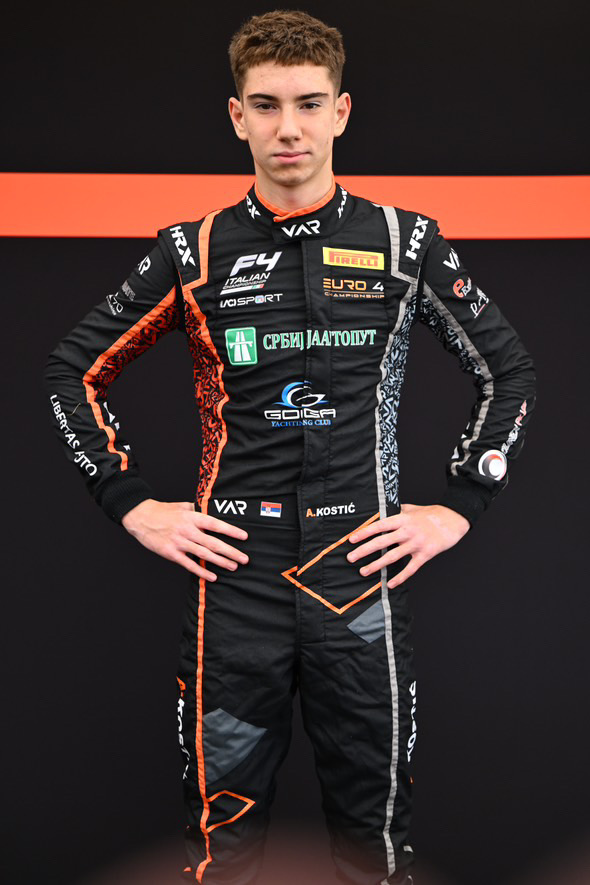
- Kostić in 2024
- Nationality: (Serbia) Serbian
- Born: 15 March 2009 (age 17) Belgrade, Serbia

Formula Regional European Championship career
- Debut season: 2026
- Current team: Trident
- Car number: 47
- Starts: 19
- Wins: 0
- Podiums: 0
- Poles: 0
- Fastest laps: 0
- Best finish: 30th in 2026

Previous series
- 2026 2025 2024–2025 2024–2025 2024: FR Middle East; Formula Winter Series; E4; Italian F4; F4 CEZ

Andrija Kostić (Serbian Cyrillic: Андрија Костић; born 15 March 2009) is a Serbian racing driver who last competed in the Formula Regional European Championship for Trident.

== Career ==
=== Karting (2022–2023) ===
Born in Belgrade on 15 March 2009, Kostić began karting in 2022, competing until 2023. Representing Serbian Racing Team for much of his karting career, Kostić most notably finished runner-up in the 2023 Serbian Karting Championship in class 4.

=== Formula 4 (2024–2025) ===
==== 2024 ====
Having tested Formula 4 machinery in late 2023, Kostić joined Van Amersfoort Racing the following year to race in the Italian F4 and Euro 4 Championships. In the Italian series, Kostić was not able to score points, only taking a best result of 14th in race two at Imola, en route to a 35th-place points finish. In Euro 4, he scored a best result of sixth in race one at Monza to end the season 15th in the standings. During 2024, Kostić also competed for Jenzer Motorsport in the first two rounds of the Formula 4 CEZ Championship and represented Serbia in the FIA Motorsport Games Formula 4 Cup. In the former, Kostić scored a best result of sixth in race one at Balaton Park, whereas in the latter, Kostić finished ninth but was promoted to eighth after Matúš Ryba was given a penalty for exceeding track limits.

==== 2025 ====
Kostić switched to US Racing for his sophomore season in Formula 4 competition in 2025. Starting off the year in Formula Winter Series, Kostić kicked off the season by finishing fourth and sixth in the first two races at Algarve. Kostić finished sixth in race two of the following round at Valencia, before finishing fifth in race one at Aragon and ninth in race two at Barcelona to end the season 11th in points. In the Italian series, Kostić began the season with two points finishes at Misano, before finishing in the top-ten in all three at races at Monza, which included a fifth-place finish in race two. Kostić then finished eighth in race two at Mugello, before not scoring points in the next two rounds, and ending the year with an eighth-place finish in race three at Misano to finish 17th in points. Kostić also raced in the three-round E4 Championship with the same team, taking a best result of fifth twice to secure a tenth-place finish at the end of the season.

=== Formula Regional (2026–present) ===
At the start of 2026, Kostić joined Trident to race in the Formula Regional Middle East Trophy. In the four-round season, Kostić scored a best result of eighth in race three of the first Yas Marina round en route to a 21st-place points finish. For the rest of the year, Kostić remained with Trident to race in the Formula Regional European Championship. In his maiden FREC season, Kostić took a best result of 12th at the Red Bull Ring as he ended the year 30th in overall points.

== Karting record ==
=== Karting career summary ===
Season	Series	Team	Position
2023	Rotax Winter Cup – Senior Max	Samku Serbian Racing Team	NC
2023	Rotax Max Euro Trophy – Senior Max	Samku Serbian Racing Team	96th
2023	RMC International Trophy – Senior Max	SSC Sportstil	NC

== Racing record ==
=== Racing career summary ===
Season	Series	Team	Races	Wins	Poles	F/Laps	Podiums	Points	Position
2024	Italian F4 Championship	Van Amersfoort Racing	18	0	0	0	0	0	35th
2024	Euro 4 Championship	Van Amersfoort Racing	9	0	0	0	0	8	15th
2024	Formula 4 CEZ Championship	Jenzer Motorsport	6	0	0	0	0	24	19th
2024	FIA Motorsport Games Formula 4 Cup	Team Serbia	2	0	0	0	0	—N/a	8th
2025	Formula Winter Series	US Racing	12	0	0	0	0	40	11th
2025	Italian F4 Championship	US Racing	20	0	0	1	0	33	17th
2025	E4 Championship	US Racing	9	0	0	0	0	26	10th
2026	Formula Regional Middle East Trophy	Trident	11	0	0	0	0	4	21st
2026	Formula Regional European Championship	Trident	19	0	0	0	0	0	30th

* Season still in progress.

=== Complete Formula 4 CEZ Championship results ===
(key) (Races in bold indicate pole position) (Races in italics indicate fastest lap)

Year	Team	1	2	3	4	5	6	7	8	9	10	11	12	13	14	15	16	17	18	DC	Points
2024	Jenzer Motorsport	BAL; 1; 6	BAL; 2; 9	BAL; 3; 8	RBR; 1; 14	RBR; 2; 12	RBR; 3; 8	SVK; 1	SVK; 2	SVK; 3	MOS; 1	MOS; 2	MOS; 3	BRN; 1	BRN; 2	BRN; 3	SAL; 1	SAL; 2	SAL; 3	19th	24

=== Complete Italian F4 Championship results ===
(key) (Races in bold indicate pole position; races in italics indicate fastest lap)

Year	Team	1	2	3	4	5	6	7	8	9	10	11	12	13	14	15	16	17	18	19	20	21	22	23	24	25	DC	Points
2024	Van Amersfoort Racing	MIS; 1; 27	MIS; 2 Ret	MIS; 3 Ret	IMO; 1; 22	IMO; 2; 14	IMO; 3; 22	VLL; 1 Ret	VLL; 2 Ret	VLL; 3; 21	MUG; 1; 23	MUG; 2; 16	MUG; 3; 27	LEC; 1; 19	LEC; 2; 15	LEC; 3; 32	CAT; 1; 25	CAT; 2; 18	CAT; 3; 24	MNZ; 1	MNZ; 2	MNZ; 3					35th	0
2025	US Racing	MIS1; 1; 8	MIS1; 2	MIS1; 3; 10	MIS1; 4; 14	VLL; 1; 15	VLL; 2; 12	VLL; 3	VLL; 4 Ret	MNZ; 1; 7	MNZ; 2; 5	MNZ; 3; 8	MUG; 1 Ret	MUG; 2; 8	MUG; 3; 13	IMO; 1; 28	IMO; 2 C	IMO; 3; 26	CAT; 1 Ret	CAT; 2; 18	CAT; 3 C	MIS2; 1	MIS2; 2; 19	MIS2; 3; 8	MIS2; 4; 11	MIS2; 5; 24	17th	33

=== Complete Euro 4/E4 Championship results ===
(key) (Races in bold indicate pole position; races in italics indicate fastest lap)

Year	Team	1	2	3	4	5	6	7	8	9	DC	Points
2024	Van Amersfoort Racing	MUG; 1; 22†	MUG; 2; 18	MUG; 3; 15	RBR; 1; 19	RBR; 2; 22	RBR; 3; 18	MNZ; 1; 6	MNZ; 2; 25	MNZ; 3; 21	15th	8
2025	US Racing	LEC; 1; 7	LEC; 2; 11	LEC; 3; 5	MUG; 1; 26	MUG; 2; 13	MUG; 3; 29	MNZ; 1; 5	MNZ; 2; 22	MNZ; 3 Ret	10th	26

=== Complete Formula Winter Series results ===
(key) (Races in bold indicate pole position) (Races in italics indicate fastest lap)

Year	Team	1	2	3	4	5	6	7	8	9	10	11	12	DC	Points
2025	US Racing	POR; 1; 4	POR; 2; 6	POR; 3; 28	CRT; 1; 22	CRT; 2; 6	CRT; 3; 11	ARA; 1; 5	ARA; 2; 11	ARA; 3; 18	CAT; 1; 12	CAT; 2; 9	CAT; 3; 19	11th	40

=== Complete Formula Regional Middle East Trophy results ===
(key) (Races in bold indicate pole position) (Races in italics indicate fastest lap)

Year	Entrant	1	2	3	4	5	6	7	8	9	10	11	12	DC	Points
2026	Trident	YMC1; 1; 12	YMC1; 2 Ret	YMC1; 3; 8	YMC2; 1 DSQ	YMC2; 2; 20	YMC2; 3; 20	DUB; 1; 21	DUB; 2; 20	DUB; 3; 13	LUS; 1; 19	LUS; 2 C	LUS; 3; 21	21st	4

=== Complete Formula Regional European Championship results ===
(key) (Races in bold indicate pole position) (Races in italics indicate fastest lap)

Year	Team	1	2	3	4	5	6	7	8	9	10	11	12	13	14	15	16	17	18	19	20	DC	Points
2026	Trident	RBR; 1; 19	RBR; 2; 13	RBR; 3; 12	ZAN; 1; 25	ZAN; 2 Ret	SPA; 1; 19	SPA; 2 C	SPA; 3; 22	MNZ; 1; 19	MNZ; 2 Ret	MNZ; 3; 22	HUN; 1; 27	HUN; 2; 24	LEC; 1; 23	LEC; 2 Ret	IMO; 1; 22†	IMO; 2 Ret	IMO; 3; 21	HOC; 1; 24†	HOC; 2 Ret	30th	0
