= 2026 F4 Saudi Arabian Championship =

Motorsport season

The 2026 F4 Saudi Arabian Championship will be the third season of the F4 Saudi Arabian Championship. It is a motor racing championship for open-wheel formula racing cars, regulated according to FIA Formula 4 regulations and overseen by the national ASN, the Saudi Automobile and Motorcycle Federation. The season began on 2–3 October at the Jeddah Corniche Circuit and conclude on 13–14 December at the Lusail International Circuit.

== Calendar ==
The calendar was announced on 21 July 2026. The championship will consist of six rounds, with the first four rounds planned for taking place at the Jeddah Corniche Circuit in Saudi Arabia. The final two rounds will be held in December at the Lusail International Circuit in Qatar. Some race weekends will once again be held on weekdays. However, it was later changed for the venues of third and fourth rounds as Bahrain International Circuit.

Round	Circuit	Date	Supporting
1	(Saudi Arabia) Jeddah Corniche Circuit, Jeddah Corniche	2–3 October	Motor Mania
2	(Saudi Arabia) Jeddah Corniche Circuit, Jeddah Corniche	7–8 October	Motor Mania
3	Bahrain International Circuit, Sakhir	31 October–1 November	Motor Mania
4	Bahrain International Circuit, Sakhir	3–4 November	Motor Mania
5	(Qatar) Lusail International Circuit, Lusail	8–9 December	Motor Mania
6	(Qatar) Lusail International Circuit, Lusail	13–14 December	Motor Mania

== Teams and drivers ==
All cars are run by Hitech Grand Prix trading as Altawkilat Motorsport.

Team	No.	Driver	Class	Rounds
Peax	6	(Singapore) Isaac Seah	R	1–4
Peax	29	(Jordan) Hamza Al-Fayez	R	1–4
7.23	7	(Germany) Amin Kara Osman	R	1–4
7.23	40	(United Kingdom) Archie Owen	R	1–4
Wrap & fly	8	(Canada) Lucas Nanji		1
Wrap & fly	44	(Switzerland) Marlon Bayer	R	1–2
Cyberani	10	(Saudi Arabia) Faris Organji		1–4
Cyberani	88	(United States) Jordyn Martin	F	1–4
SDEC	16	(United Arab Emirates) Zakaria Doleh		1–4
SDEC	31	(Lebanon) Georges Nassar	R	1–4
Zahid	19	(India) Veer Chopra	R	1–4
Zahid	56	(United Kingdom) Rachel Robertson	F	2, 4
Zahid	TBA	(Serbia) Aleksandar Vukcevic	R	TBC
Iconna	21	(United Kingdom) Harrison Mackie		3–4
Iconna	24	(United Kingdom) Harrison Mackie		1–2
Iconna	99	(Saudi Arabia) Abdullah Kamel		1–4
My-Car	27	(United States) Devin Walz	R	1–4
My-Car	66	(Netherlands) Eva Dorrestijn	R F	1–4

Icon	Legend
R	Rookie
F	Female
G	Guest drivers ineligible to score points

== Race results ==
Rnd.		Circuit	Pole position	Fastest lap	Winning driver	Rookie Winner
1	1	(Saudi Arabia) Jeddah Corniche Circuit, Jeddah Corniche	(Switzerland) Marlon Bayer (Note: Harrison Mackie set the fastest time in qualifying, but received a 3-place grid penalty. Marlon Bayer, who set the second fastest time, was promoted to pole position.)	(United Kingdom) Harrison Mackie	(United Kingdom) Archie Owen	(United Kingdom) Archie Owen
1	2	(Saudi Arabia) Jeddah Corniche Circuit, Jeddah Corniche	(Switzerland) Marlon Bayer	(Switzerland) Marlon Bayer	(Switzerland) Marlon Bayer	(Switzerland) Marlon Bayer
2	3	(Saudi Arabia) Jeddah Corniche Circuit, Jeddah Corniche	(Singapore) Isaac Seah	(United Kingdom) Archie Owen	(Switzerland) Marlon Bayer	(Switzerland) Marlon Bayer
2	4	(Saudi Arabia) Jeddah Corniche Circuit, Jeddah Corniche	(Switzerland) Marlon Bayer	(Switzerland) Marlon Bayer	(United Kingdom) Archie Owen	(United Kingdom) Archie Owen
3	5	Bahrain International Circuit, Sakhir	(Singapore) Isaac Seah	(United Kingdom) Archie Owen	(United Kingdom) Archie Owen	(United Kingdom) Archie Owen
3	6	Bahrain International Circuit, Sakhir	(Singapore) Isaac Seah	(United Kingdom) Archie Owen	(Singapore) Isaac Seah	(Singapore) Isaac Seah
4	7	Bahrain International Circuit, Sakhir	(United Kingdom) Archie Owen	(Singapore) Isaac Seah	(Singapore) Isaac Seah	(Singapore) Isaac Seah
4	8	Bahrain International Circuit, Sakhir	(United Kingdom) Archie Owen	(United Kingdom) Archie Owen	(United Kingdom) Archie Owen	(United Kingdom) Archie Owen
5	9	(Qatar) Lusail International Circuit, Lusail				
5	10	(Qatar) Lusail International Circuit, Lusail				
6	11	(Qatar) Lusail International Circuit, Lusail				
6	12	(Qatar) Lusail International Circuit, Lusail				

== Championship standings ==
Points are awarded to the top 10 classified finishers in each race. No points are awarded for pole position or fastest lap.

Position	1st	2nd	3rd	4th	5th	6th	7th	8th	9th	10th
Points	25	18	15	12	10	8	6	4	2	1

=== Drivers' Championship ===
Pos	Driver	JED1 (Saudi Arabia)		JED2 (Saudi Arabia)		BHR1 (Bahrain)		BHR2 (Bahrain)		LUS1 (Qatar)		LUS2 (Qatar)		Pts
Pos	Driver	R1	R2	R1	R2	R1	R2	R1	R2	R1	R2	R1	R2	Pts
1	(United Kingdom) Archie Owen	1	3	3	1	1	2	2	1					166
2	(Singapore) Isaac Seah	6	5	Ret	3	2	1	1	2					119
3	(United Kingdom) Harrison Mackie	2	2	Ret	5	3	3	3	4					103
4	(Switzerland) Marlon Bayer	3	1	1	2									83
5	(Germany) Amin Kara Osman	4	6	4	4	4	10	7	3					78
6	(United States) Devin Walz	7	14	5	11	5	4	4	5					60
7	(Jordan) Hamza Al-Fayez	12	8	12	7	8	8	5	7					34
8	(United Arab Emirates) Zakaria Doleh	9	7	11	8	6	7	6	Ret					34
9	(India) Veer Chopra	8	9	7	10	7	5	11	8					33
10	(Saudi Arabia) Abdullah Kamel	14	11	2	6	13	12	10	Ret					27
11	(Canada) Lucas Nanji	5	4											22
12	(Lebanon) Georges Nassar	10	12	6	12	12	6	WD	WD					17
13	(United Kingdom) Rachel Robertson			8	9			9	6					16
14	(United States) Jordyn Martin	13	10	9	Ret	9	9	8	11					11
15	(Saudi Arabia) Faris Organji	11	15	Ret	13	10	11	12	9					3
16	(Netherlands) Eva Dorrestijn	15	13	10	14	11	13	13	10					2
