= 2025 E4 Championship =

Junior open-wheel racing championship

The 2025 E4 Championship was the third season of the E4 Championship (previously titled Euro 4 Championship). It is a multi-event motor racing championship for open wheel, formula racing cars regulated according to FIA Formula 4 regulations, run by ACI Sport and WSK Promotion. The championship uses Tatuus F4-T421 chassis.

== Teams and drivers ==
Team	No.	Driver	Class	Rounds
(Slovenia) AS Motorsport	2	(Brazil) Aurelia Nobels	W	2
(Slovenia) AS Motorsport	18	(Germany) Mathilda Paatz	W	2–3
(Netherlands) Van Amersfoort Racing	3	(Italy) Maksimilian Popov (Note: Popov is Russian-Grenadian, but he competes under an Italian licence as Russian national emblems were banned by the FIA following the Russian invasion of Ukraine.)		All
(Netherlands) Van Amersfoort Racing	16	(United States) Andre Rodriguez	R	All
(Netherlands) Van Amersfoort Racing	38	(Poland) Aleksander Ruta	R	All
(Netherlands) Van Amersfoort Racing	66	(Australia) Dante Vinci	R	All
(Netherlands) Van Amersfoort Racing	94	(United States) Payton Westcott	R W	All
(Germany) US Racing	4	(Serbia) Andrija Kostić		All
(Germany) US Racing	19	(Singapore) Kabir Anurag		All
(Germany) US Racing	29	(Italy) Ludovico Busso	R	2–3
(Germany) US Racing	46	(India) Ary Bansal		All
(Germany) US Racing	62	(Germany) Arjen Kräling	R	2–3
(Germany) US Racing	78	(Brazil) Gabriel Gomez		All
(Italy) Prema Racing	5	(Italy) Andrea Dupé (Note: Dupé is a French driver competing under an Italian licence.)	R	2–3
(Italy) Prema Racing	27	(Ukraine) Oleksandr Bondarev	R	All
(Italy) Prema Racing	28	(Italy) Newman Chi (Note: Chi is a Chinese driver competing under an Italian licence.)	R	All
(Italy) Prema Racing	48	(Canada) Lucas Nanji	R	3
(Italy) Prema Racing	51	(Japan) Kean Nakamura-Berta		All
(Italy) Prema Racing	88	(Colombia) Salim Hanna	R	All
(Italy) Prema Racing	98	(United States) Sebastian Wheldon		All
(Italy) BVM Racing	8	(Italy) Niccolò Maccagnani	R	3
(France) R-ace GP	10	(France) Andy Consani	R	2–3
(France) R-ace GP	41	(United States) Alex Powell (Note: Powell is a Jamaican-American driver competing under an American licence.)		All
(France) R-ace GP	42	(United Kingdom) Emily Cotty	R W	All
(France) R-ace GP	44	(Israel) Guy Albag	R	All
(France) R-ace GP	52	(Italy) Oleksandr Savinkov (Note: Savinkov is a Russo-Ukrainian driver who competed under a Ukrainian licence at round 1 and an Italian licence at rounds 2–3.)		All
(Romania) Real Racing	11	(Romania) Luca Viișoreanu		1
(San Marino) AKM Motorsport	12	(Italy) Ginevra Panzeri	R W	All
(San Marino) AKM Motorsport	14	(Mexico) Javier Herrera	R	2
(San Marino) AKM Motorsport	33	(Latvia) Tomass Štolcermanis		2
(San Marino) AKM Motorsport	43	(Costa Rica) Evan Michelini	R	All
(San Marino) AKM Motorsport	99	(Saudi Arabia) Abdullah Ayman Kamel	R	All
(Switzerland) Jenzer Motorsport	20	(Switzerland) Enea Frey		1
(Switzerland) Jenzer Motorsport	21	(Argentina) Teo Schropp		All
(Switzerland) Jenzer Motorsport	26	(Qatar) Bader Al Sulaiti	R	All
(Switzerland) Jenzer Motorsport	56	(Mexico) Nicolás Cortés	R	3
(Switzerland) Jenzer Motorsport	77	(United Kingdom) Bart Harrison		1
(Switzerland) Jenzer Motorsport	39	(Germany) Elia Weiss	R	3
(Italy) Cram Motorsport	39	(Germany) Elia Weiss	R	2
(Italy) Cram Motorsport	37	(Italy) Oscar Repetto (Note: Repetto is a New Zealand and Monégasque driver competing under an Italian licence.)	R	2
(Italy) Viola Formula Racing	29	(Italy) Ludovico Busso	R	1
(Germany) PHM Racing	69	(Netherlands) Reno Francot		All
(Hungary) Zengő Motorsport	96	(Hungary) Benett Gáspár	R	1

Icon	Legend
R	Rookie
W	Woman Trophy

- Maxim Rehm was scheduled to compete for US Racing, but did not enter any rounds.

== Race calendar and results ==
Round		Circuit	Date	Pole Position	Fastest Lap	Winning Driver	Winning Team	Secondary Class Winner	Supporting
1	R1	(France) Circuit Paul Ricard, Le Castellet	19 July	(Japan) Kean Nakamura-Berta	(United States) Sebastian Wheldon	(Brazil) Gabriel Gomez	(Germany) US Racing	R: (Ukraine) Oleksandr Bondarev; W: (United Kingdom) Emily Cotty	International GT Open; Formula Regional European Championship; Euroformula Open Championship; GT Cup Open Europe
1	R2	(France) Circuit Paul Ricard, Le Castellet	20 July	(Japan) Kean Nakamura-Berta	(Netherlands) Reno Francot	(Netherlands) Reno Francot	(Germany) PHM Racing	R: (Ukraine) Oleksandr Bondarev; W: (United Kingdom) Emily Cotty	International GT Open; Formula Regional European Championship; Euroformula Open Championship; GT Cup Open Europe
1	R3	(France) Circuit Paul Ricard, Le Castellet	20 July	(Brazil) Gabriel Gomez	(Brazil) Gabriel Gomez	(Brazil) Gabriel Gomez	(Germany) US Racing	R: (Ukraine) Oleksandr Bondarev; W: (United States) Payton Westcott	International GT Open; Formula Regional European Championship; Euroformula Open Championship; GT Cup Open Europe
2	R1	(Italy) Mugello Circuit, Scarperia e San Piero	13 September	(Japan) Kean Nakamura-Berta	(Japan) Kean Nakamura-Berta	(Japan) Kean Nakamura-Berta	(Italy) Prema Racing	R: (Colombia) Salim Hanna; W: (Italy) Ginevra Panzeri	Italian GT Championship; TCR Italy Touring Car Championship
2	R2	(Italy) Mugello Circuit, Scarperia e San Piero	13 September	(Japan) Kean Nakamura-Berta	(United States) Alex Powell	(United States) Alex Powell	(France) R-ace GP	R: (Colombia) Salim Hanna; W: (Germany) Mathilda Paatz	Italian GT Championship; TCR Italy Touring Car Championship
2	R3	(Italy) Mugello Circuit, Scarperia e San Piero	14 September	(United States) Alex Powell	(United States) Sebastian Wheldon	(United States) Sebastian Wheldon	(Italy) Prema Racing	R: (Colombia) Salim Hanna; W: (Germany) Mathilda Paatz	Italian GT Championship; TCR Italy Touring Car Championship
3	R1	(Italy) Monza Circuit, Monza	24–26 October	(Japan) Kean Nakamura-Berta	(United States) Sebastian Wheldon	(Japan) Kean Nakamura-Berta	(Italy) Prema Racing	R: (Ukraine) Oleksandr Bondarev; W: (United Kingdom) Emily Cotty	Formula Regional European Championship; Italian GT Championship; Porsche Carrera Cup Italia
3	R2	(Italy) Monza Circuit, Monza	24–26 October	(Japan) Kean Nakamura-Berta	(India) Ary Bansal	(Japan) Kean Nakamura-Berta	(Italy) Prema Racing	R: (Italy) Newman Chi; W: (Germany) Mathilda Paatz	Formula Regional European Championship; Italian GT Championship; Porsche Carrera Cup Italia
3	R3	(Italy) Monza Circuit, Monza	24–26 October	(Japan) Kean Nakamura-Berta	(Brazil) Gabriel Gomez	(Japan) Kean Nakamura-Berta	(Italy) Prema Racing	R: (Colombia) Salim Hanna; W: (Germany) Mathilda Paatz	Formula Regional European Championship; Italian GT Championship; Porsche Carrera Cup Italia

== Championship standings ==
Points are awarded to the top 10 classified finishers in each race. No points are awarded for pole position or fastest lap.

Position	**1st**	**2nd**	**3rd**	**4th**	**5th**	**6th**	**7th**	**8th**	**9th**	**10th**
Points	25	18	15	12	10	8	6	4	2	1

=== Drivers' championship ===
Pos	Driver	LEC (France)			MUG (Italy)			MNZ (Italy)			Pts
Pos	Driver	R1	R2	R3	R1	R2	R3	R1	R2	R3	Pts
1	(Japan) Kean Nakamura-Berta	**2**	**3**	2	**1**	**2**	4	**1**	**1**	**1**	181
2	(Brazil) Gabriel Gomez	1	2	**1**	6	5	5	2	2	9	134
3	(Netherlands) Reno Francot	5	1	6	28†	3	3	6	3	4	108
4	(United States) Sebastian Wheldon	3	4	3	9	9	1	8	4	10	88
5	(United States) Alex Powell	Ret	9	4	2	1	**2**	11	10	5	86
6	(Singapore) Kabir Anurag	4	5	21	30†	6	12	3	6	3	68
7	(Colombia) Salim Hanna	10	24	25	4	4	6	17	8	2	55
8	(Italy) Maksimilian Popov	24†	6	26†	3	8	16	4	7	14	45
9	(Ukraine) Oleksandr Bondarev	6	7	7	8	11	17	7	11	13	30
10	(Serbia) Andrija Kostić	7	11	5	26	13	29	5	22	Ret	26
11	(Australia) Dante Vinci	11	14	22	5	7	10	24	28†	8	21
12	(Italy) Newman Chi	8	Ret	18	29†	10	8	14	5	27†	19
13	(Poland) Aleksander Ruta	9	18	10	7	12	9	Ret	26	Ret	11
14	(Switzerland) Enea Frey	Ret	8	8							8
15	(Italy) Niccolò Maccagnani							12	12	6	8
16	(Latvia) Tomass Štolcermanis				18	18	7				6
17	(Germany) Arjen Kräling				16	17	31	13	27	7	6
18	(France) Andy Consani				10	20	11	9	19	28†	3
19	(India) Ary Bansal	Ret	13	9	15	19	15	Ret	Ret	23	2
20	(Germany) Elia Weiss				17	24	19	Ret	9	Ret	2
21	(Italy) Oleksandr Savinkov	Ret	15	11	11	22	18	10	31†	11	1
22	(United Kingdom) Bart Harrison	12	10	15							1
23	(Italy) Ludovico Busso	15	Ret	23	12	21	13	Ret	14	12	0
24	(Romania) Luca Viișoreanu	Ret	12	17							0
25	(Israel) Guy Albag	18	Ret	12	27	23	30	18	17	24	0
26	(Qatar) Bader Al Sulaiti	23	16	24	13	16	32	25†	20	20	0
27	(United Kingdom) Emily Cotty	13	20	Ret	Ret	27	25	19	24	18	0
28	(Canada) Lucas Nanji							21	13	21	0
29	(Saudi Arabia) Abdullah Ayman Kamel	16	21	13	25	31	27	23	18	25	0
30	(Argentina) Teo Schropp	14	17	14	Ret	15	14	Ret	DNS	DNS	0
31	(Italy) Andrea Dupé				14	14	Ret	Ret	29†	15	0
32	(Costa Rica) Evan Michelini	20	19	28†	22	30	22	15	23	26	0
33	(Germany) Mathilda Paatz				Ret	26	20	20	15	16	0
34	(United States) Andre Rodriguez	19	26	27†	24	32	28	16	30†	17	0
35	(United States) Payton Westcott	21	22	16	Ret	28	Ret	Ret	16	19	0
36	(Hungary) Benett Gáspár	17	23	19							0
37	(Mexico) Javier Herrera				19	25	24				0
38	(Italy) Ginevra Panzeri	22	25	20	21	34	26	22	21	22	0
39	(Italy) Oscar Repetto				20	29	21				0
40	(Brazil) Aurelia Nobels				23	33	23				0
41	(Mexico) Nicolás Cortés							Ret	25	Ret	0
Pos	Driver	R1	R2	R3	R1	R2	R3	R1	R2	R3	Pts
Pos	Driver	LEC (France)			MUG (Italy)			MNZ (Italy)			Pts

Colour	Result
Gold	Winner
Silver	Second place
Bronze	Third place
Green	Points classification
Blue	Non-points classification
Blue	Non-classified finish (NC)
Purple	Retired, not classified (Ret)
Red	Did not qualify (DNQ)
Red	Did not pre-qualify (DNPQ)
Black	Disqualified (DSQ)
White	Did not start (DNS)
White	Withdrew (WD)
White	Race cancelled (C)
Blank	Did not practice (DNP)
Blank	Did not arrive (DNA)
Blank	Excluded (EX)

**Bold** – Pole
Italics – Fastest Lap
† — Did not finish, but classified

=== Secondary classes standings ===
Pos	Driver	LEC (France)			MUG (Italy)			MNZ (Italy)			Pts
Pos	Driver	R1	R2	R3	R1	R2	R3	R1	R2	R3	Pts
Rookies' championship
1	(Ukraine) Oleksandr Bondarev	1	1	1	4	4	7	1	4	6	136
2	(Colombia) Salim Hanna	4	10	12	1	1	1	8	2	1	134
3	(Italy) Newman Chi	2	Ret	6	18	3	2	5	1	17	94
4	(Australia) Dante Vinci	5	2	9	2	2	4	14	19†	4	90
5	(Poland) Aleksander Ruta	3	4	2	3	5	3	Ret	17	Ret	85
6	(Italy) Niccolò Maccagnani							3	5	2	43
7	(France) Andy Consani				5	9	5	2	11	18	40
8	(Italy) Ludovico Busso	7	Ret	10	6	10	6	Ret	7	5	40
9	(Germany) Arjen Kräling				9	8	18	4	18	3	33
10	(Qatar) Bader Al Sulaiti	15	3	11	7	7	17	15	12	11	27
11	(Saudi Arabia) Abdullah Ayman Kamel	8	7	4	17	18	14	13	10	15	23
12	(Israel) Guy Albag	10	Ret	3	13	11	16	9	9	14	20
13	(Germany) Elia Weiss				10	12	8	Ret	3	Ret	20
14	(Costa Rica) Evan Michelini	12	5	14†	15	17	10	6	14	16	19
15	(United States) Payton Westcott	13	8	5	Ret	15	Ret	Ret	8	10	19
16	(United Kingdom) Emily Cotty	6	6	Ret	Ret	14	12	10	15	9	19
17	(Italy) Andrea Dupé				8	6	Ret	Ret	20†	7	18
18	(Hungary) Benett Gáspár	9	9	7							10
19	(United States) Andre Rodriguez	11	12	13†	16	19	15	7	21†	8	10
20	(Canada) Lucas Nanji							11	6	12	8
21	(Italy) Ginevra Panzeri	14	11	8	14	20	13	12	13	13	4
22	(Italy) Oscar Repetto				12	16	9				2
23	(Mexico) Javier Herrera				11	13	11				0
24	(Mexico) Nicolás Cortés							Ret	16	Ret	0
Women's championship
1	(United Kingdom) Emily Cotty	1	1	Ret	Ret	2	3	1	4	2	138
2	(Germany) Mathilda Paatz				Ret	1	1	2	1	1	118
3	(Italy) Ginevra Panzeri	3	3	2	1	5	4	3	3	4	115
4	(United States) Payton Westcott	2	2	1	Ret	3	Ret	Ret	2	3	109
5	(Brazil) Aurelia Nobels				2	4	2				48
Pos	Driver	R1	R2	R3	R1	R2	R3	R1	R2	R3	Pts
Pos	Driver	LEC (France)			MUG (Italy)			MNZ (Italy)			Pts

=== Teams' championship ===
Each team acquired the points earned by their two best drivers in each race.

Pos	Driver	LEC (France)			MUG (Italy)			MNZ (Italy)			Pts
Pos	Driver	R1	R2	R3	R1	R2	R3	R1	R2	R3	Pts
1	(Italy) Prema Racing	2	3	2	1	2	1	1	1	1	308
1	(Italy) Prema Racing	3	4	3	4	4	4	7	4	2	308
2	(Germany) US Racing	1	2	1	6	5	5	2	2	3	216
2	(Germany) US Racing	4	5	5	12	6	12	3	6	7	216
3	(Germany) PHM Racing	5	1	6	28†	3	3	6	3	4	108
4	(France) R-ace GP	13	9	4	2	1	2	9	10	5	90
4	(France) R-ace GP	18	15	11	10	20	11	10	17	11	90
5	(Netherlands) Van Amersfoort Racing	9	6	10	3	7	9	4	7	8	71
5	(Netherlands) Van Amersfoort Racing	11	14	16	5	8	10	16	16	14	71
6	(Switzerland) Jenzer Motorsport	12	8	8	13	15	14	25†	9	20	11
6	(Switzerland) Jenzer Motorsport	14	10	14	Ret	16	32†	Ret	20	Ret	11
7	(Italy) BVM Racing							12	12	6	8
8	(San Marino) AKM Motorsport	16	19	13	18	18	7	15	18	22	6
8	(San Marino) AKM Motorsport	20	21	20	19	25	22	22	21	25	6
9	(Romania) Real Racing	Ret	12	17							0
10	(Germany) Mathilda Racing				Ret	26	20	20	15	16	0
11	(Italy) Viola Formula Racing	15	Ret	23							0
12	(Italy) Cram Motorsport				17	24	19				0
12	(Italy) Cram Motorsport				20	29	21				0
13	(Hungary) Zengő Motorsport	17	23	19							0
14	(Slovenia) AS Motorsport				23	33	23				0
Pos	Driver	R1	R2	R3	R1	R2	R3	R1	R2	R3	Pts
Pos	Driver	LEC (France)			MUG (Italy)			MNZ (Italy)			Pts

Colour	Result
Gold	Winner
Silver	Second place
Bronze	Third place
Green	Points classification
Blue	Non-points classification
Blue	Non-classified finish (NC)
Purple	Retired, not classified (Ret)
Red	Did not qualify (DNQ)
Red	Did not pre-qualify (DNPQ)
Black	Disqualified (DSQ)
White	Did not start (DNS)
White	Withdrew (WD)
White	Race cancelled (C)
Blank	Did not practice (DNP)
Blank	Did not arrive (DNA)
Blank	Excluded (EX)

**Bold** – Pole
Italics – Fastest Lap
† — Did not finish, but classified

== See also ==
- 2025 Italian F4 Championship
