= 2025 Formula Winter Series =

Motor racing competition

The 2025 Formula Winter Series was the third season of the Formula Winter Series. It was a multi-event motor racing championship for open wheel, formula racing cars regulated according to FIA Formula 4 regulations, based in Spain.

== Entry list ==
Team	No.	Driver	Class	Rounds
(Netherlands) Van Amersfoort Racing	3	(Italy) Maksimilian Popov (Note: Kutskov and Zhuravskiy are Russian, but they compete under a Kyrgyz licence as Russian national emblems were banned by the FIA following the Russian invasion of Ukraine. Popov, also a Russian, competes under an Italian licence for the same reason, while Severiukhin competes under a British licence.)		All
(Netherlands) Van Amersfoort Racing	38	(Poland) Aleksander Ruta	R	4
(Netherlands) Van Amersfoort Racing	48	(Argentina) Gino Trappa		2–3
(Netherlands) Van Amersfoort Racing	66	(Australia) Dante Vinci	R	All
(Netherlands) Van Amersfoort Racing	94	(United States) Payton Westcott	R F	All
(United Kingdom) Hitech TGR	4	(Netherlands) Nina Gademan	F	1–3
(United Kingdom) Hitech TGR	4	(United Kingdom) Emily Cotty	F	4
(United Kingdom) Hitech TGR	5	(Republic of Ireland) Fionn McLaughlin	R	All
(United Kingdom) Hitech TGR	6	(Algeria) Leo Robinson		All
(United Kingdom) Hitech TGR	7	(United Kingdom) Thomas Bearman	R	All
(Germany) US Racing	8	(Finland) Luka Sammalisto		1, 4
(Germany) US Racing	10	(Serbia) Andrija Kostić		All
(Germany) US Racing	15	(Spain) Edu Robinson		1–2
(Germany) US Racing	19	(Singapore) Kabir Anurag		All
(Germany) US Racing	50	(Czech Republic) Jan Koller		2, 4
(Germany) US Racing	71	(Germany) Maxim Rehm		All
(Germany) US Racing	78	(Brazil) Gabriel Gomez		All
(San Marino) AKM Motorsport	11	(Kyrgyzstan) Georgy Zhuravskiy		1
(San Marino) AKM Motorsport	12	(Australia) Joanne Ciconte	R F	1–2
(San Marino) AKM Motorsport	12	(Italy) Ginevra Panzeri	R F	3–4
(San Marino) AKM Motorsport	14	(Israel) Guy Albag	R	2
(San Marino) AKM Motorsport	14	(Norway) Marcus Sæter	R	3
(San Marino) AKM Motorsport	14	(Italy) Davide Larini		4
(Spain) Campos Racing	16	(United Kingdom) Alisha Palmowski	F	1–2
(Spain) Campos Racing	17	(Brazil) Rafaela Ferreira	F	1, 3
(Spain) Campos Racing	82	(United States) Chloe Chambers	F	2–3
(Slovenia) AS Motorsport	18	(Germany) Mathilda Paatz	F	All
(Slovenia) AS Motorsport	61	(France) Andrea Dupé	R	All
(Slovenia) AS Motorsport	62	(Denmark) Sebastian Bach		1–3
(Switzerland) Jenzer Motorsport	20	(Switzerland) Enea Frey		All
(Switzerland) Jenzer Motorsport	21	(United Kingdom) Bart Harrison		All
(Switzerland) Jenzer Motorsport	23	(United Kingdom) Artem Severiukhin	R	All
(Switzerland) Jenzer Motorsport	24	(Denmark) Alba Hurup Larsen	R F	1–3
(Switzerland) Jenzer Motorsport	24	(Mexico) Javier Herrera		4
(Switzerland) Maffi Racing	22	(Czech Republic) Teodor Borenstein		All
(Switzerland) Maffi Racing	27	(Poland) Kornelia Olkucka	F	1
(Switzerland) Maffi Racing	91	(Poland) Kornelia Olkucka	F	2–4
(Switzerland) Maffi Racing	31	(Kyrgyzstan) Kirill Kutskov		1, 4
(Switzerland) Maffi Racing	84	(Denmark) David Walther	R	2–3
(Austria) Renauer Motorsport	25	(Austria) Simon Schranz	R	All
(Italy) Viola Formula Racing	29	(Italy) Ludovico Busso	R	4
(Italy) Cram Motorsport	35	(Australia) Aiva Anagnostiadis	F	1
(Italy) Cram Motorsport	37	(Poland) Aleksander Ruta	R	1–3
(Italy) Cram Motorsport	39	(Germany) Elia Weiss	R	3–4
(Italy) Cram Motorsport	83	(Brazil) Ricardo Baptista	R	2

- Ethan Nobels was scheduled to compete for AKM Motorsport, but did not appear at any rounds.
- Lithuanian team Juta Racing planned to field a car in the final two rounds, but did not appear.
- British teams Argenti Motorsport and JHR Developments were officially announced to join the championship, but withdrew prior to the start of the season.

== Calendar ==
Round		Circuit	Date	Supporting	Map of circuit locations
1	R1	(Portugal) Algarve International Circuit, Portimão	30 January–2 February	6 Hours of Portimão	2025 Formula Winter Series is located in Iberia
1	R2	(Portugal) Algarve International Circuit, Portimão	30 January–2 February	6 Hours of Portimão	2025 Formula Winter Series is located in Iberia
1	R3	(Portugal) Algarve International Circuit, Portimão	30 January–2 February	6 Hours of Portimão	2025 Formula Winter Series is located in Iberia
2	R1	(Spain) Circuit Ricardo Tormo, Cheste	13–16 February	GT Winter Series; GT4 Winter Series	2025 Formula Winter Series is located in Iberia
2	R2	(Spain) Circuit Ricardo Tormo, Cheste	13–16 February	GT Winter Series; GT4 Winter Series	2025 Formula Winter Series is located in Iberia
2	R3	(Spain) Circuit Ricardo Tormo, Cheste	13–16 February	GT Winter Series; GT4 Winter Series	2025 Formula Winter Series is located in Iberia
3	R1	(Spain) MotorLand Aragón, Alcañiz	1–3 March	GT Winter Series; Prototype Winter Series; GT4 Winter Series	2025 Formula Winter Series is located in Iberia
3	R2	(Spain) MotorLand Aragón, Alcañiz	1–3 March	GT Winter Series; Prototype Winter Series; GT4 Winter Series	2025 Formula Winter Series is located in Iberia
3	R3	(Spain) MotorLand Aragón, Alcañiz	1–3 March	GT Winter Series; Prototype Winter Series; GT4 Winter Series	2025 Formula Winter Series is located in Iberia
4	R1	(Spain) Circuit de Barcelona-Catalunya, Montmeló	6–9 March	GT Winter Series; Prototype Winter Series; GT4 Winter Series	2025 Formula Winter Series is located in Iberia
4	R2	(Spain) Circuit de Barcelona-Catalunya, Montmeló	6–9 March	GT Winter Series; Prototype Winter Series; GT4 Winter Series	2025 Formula Winter Series is located in Iberia
4	R3	(Spain) Circuit de Barcelona-Catalunya, Montmeló	6–9 March	GT Winter Series; Prototype Winter Series; GT4 Winter Series	2025 Formula Winter Series is located in Iberia

== Results ==
Round		Circuit	Pole position	Fastest lap	Winning driver	Winning team	Rookie winner	Female Driver Trophy winner
1	R1	(Portugal) Algarve International Circuit, Portimão	(Brazil) Gabriel Gomez	(Brazil) Gabriel Gomez	(Brazil) Gabriel Gomez	(Germany) US Racing	(Republic of Ireland) Fionn McLaughlin	(Netherlands) Nina Gademan
1	R2	(Portugal) Algarve International Circuit, Portimão	(Brazil) Gabriel Gomez	(Brazil) Gabriel Gomez	(Brazil) Gabriel Gomez	(Germany) US Racing	(United Kingdom) Thomas Bearman	(Netherlands) Nina Gademan
1	R3	(Portugal) Algarve International Circuit, Portimão	(Spain) Edu Robinson	(United Kingdom) Artem Severiukhin	(Republic of Ireland) Fionn McLaughlin	(United Kingdom) Hitech TGR	(Republic of Ireland) Fionn McLaughlin	(Netherlands) Nina Gademan
2	R1	(Spain) Circuit Ricardo Tormo, Cheste	(Brazil) Gabriel Gomez	(Brazil) Gabriel Gomez	(Brazil) Gabriel Gomez	(Germany) US Racing	(Australia) Dante Vinci	(Netherlands) Nina Gademan
2	R2	(Spain) Circuit Ricardo Tormo, Cheste	(Brazil) Gabriel Gomez	(Singapore) Kabir Anurag	(Germany) Maxim Rehm	(Germany) US Racing	(Australia) Dante Vinci	(Netherlands) Nina Gademan
2	R3	(Spain) Circuit Ricardo Tormo, Cheste	(Brazil) Gabriel Gomez	(Algeria) Leo Robinson	(Algeria) Leo Robinson	(United Kingdom) Hitech TGR	(Australia) Dante Vinci	(United States) Chloe Chambers
3	R1	(Spain) MotorLand Aragón, Alcañiz	(Brazil) Gabriel Gomez	(Singapore) Kabir Anurag	(Singapore) Kabir Anurag	(Germany) US Racing	(Republic of Ireland) Fionn McLaughlin	(Netherlands) Nina Gademan
3	R2	(Spain) MotorLand Aragón, Alcañiz	(Brazil) Gabriel Gomez	(Republic of Ireland) Fionn McLaughlin	(Republic of Ireland) Fionn McLaughlin	(United Kingdom) Hitech TGR	(Republic of Ireland) Fionn McLaughlin	(Netherlands) Nina Gademan
3	R3	(Spain) MotorLand Aragón, Alcañiz	(Singapore) Kabir Anurag	(Germany) Maxim Rehm	(Republic of Ireland) Fionn McLaughlin	(United Kingdom) Hitech TGR	(Republic of Ireland) Fionn McLaughlin	(United States) Payton Westcott
4	R1	(Spain) Circuit de Barcelona-Catalunya, Montmeló	(Algeria) Leo Robinson	(Singapore) Kabir Anurag	(Algeria) Leo Robinson	(United Kingdom) Hitech TGR	(Republic of Ireland) Fionn McLaughlin	(United Kingdom) Emily Cotty
4	R2	(Spain) Circuit de Barcelona-Catalunya, Montmeló	(Algeria) Leo Robinson	(Algeria) Leo Robinson	(Algeria) Leo Robinson	(United Kingdom) Hitech TGR	(Republic of Ireland) Fionn McLaughlin	(Germany) Mathilda Paatz
4	R3	(Spain) Circuit de Barcelona-Catalunya, Montmeló	(Germany) Maxim Rehm	(Poland) Aleksander Ruta	(Singapore) Kabir Anurag	(Germany) US Racing	(United Kingdom) Thomas Bearman	(Italy) Ginevra Panzeri

== Championship standings ==
=== Scoring system ===
Points are awarded to the top ten classified drivers, the pole-sitter in races one and three, and the fastest lap holder as follows:

Position	**1st**	**2nd**	**3rd**	**4th**	**5th**	**6th**	**7th**	**8th**	**9th**	**10th**	Pole	FL
Points	25	18	15	12	10	8	6	4	2	1	2	1

=== Drivers' championship ===
Pos	Driver	(Portugal) POR			(Spain) CRT			(Spain) ARA			(Spain) CAT			Pts
1	(Brazil) Gabriel Gomez	**1**	**1**	3	**1**	**3**	**2**	**2**	**3**	3	Ret	5	4	204
2	(Algeria) Leo Robinson	2	Ret	2	2	2	1	Ret	6	11	**1**	**1**	8	163
3	(Republic of Ireland) Fionn McLaughlin	5	23	1	7	8	8	3	1	1	2	2	24	151
4	(Singapore) Kabir Anurag	Ret	DNS	8	4	4	4	1	2	**5**	3	Ret	1	138
5	(Germany) Maxim Rehm	DSQ	DSQ	DSQ	3	1	7	Ret	7	2	6	7	**Ret**	89
6	(Italy) Maksimilian Popov	9	3	29	5	5	3	4	4	4	21	Ret	13	88
7	(United Kingdom) Bart Harrison	7	8	7	9	11	9	Ret	5	6	Ret	3	3	68
8	(United Kingdom) Thomas Bearman	24	5	4	24†	16	15	6	8	14	23	6	2	60
9	(Switzerland) Enea Frey	Ret	7	6	8	12	6	7	15	7	7	25	5	56
10	(United Kingdom) Artem Severiukhin	21	11	9	23	Ret	10	8	16	9	4	4	6	42
11	(Serbia) Andrija Kostić	4	6	28	22	6	11	5	11	18	12	9	19	40
12	(Spain) Edu Robinson	3	2	**10**	25†	9	20							38
13	(Finland) Luka Sammalisto	10	4	5							8	10	9	32
14	(Australia) Dante Vinci	25	21	15	6	7	5	20	9	16	13	12	12	26
15	(Netherlands) Nina Gademan **(F)**	6	10	11	11	10	14	9	10	22				13
16	(Kyrgyzstan) Kirill Kutskov	8	14	24							16	20	7	10
17	(France) Andrea Dupé	11	18	21	13	19	29†	11	13	12	10	8	15	6
18	(Czech Republic) Jan Koller				15	14	Ret				9	15	11	5
19	(Austria) Simon Schranz	26†	12	14	17	27	27	Ret	18	8	DNS	11	18	4
20	(Denmark) Sebastian Bach	18	9	16	12	22	Ret	Ret	12	10				3
21	(Poland) Aleksander Ruta	22	Ret	17	Ret	23	28†	10	22	15	11	16	22	3
22	(Argentina) Gino Trappa				10	13	22	13	14	25				1
23	(United Kingdom) Alisha Palmowski **(F)**	13	13	12	Ret	15	24							0
24	(Brazil) Rafaela Ferreira **(F)**	16	Ret	20				12	24	23				0
25	(Czech Republic) Teodor Borenstein	12	19	25	18	29	26	17	23	27	17	21	27	0
26	(Denmark) David Walther				Ret	20	12	23	19	21				0
27	(United States) Payton Westcott **(F)**	17	17	23	19	24	17	15	Ret	13	19	23	25	0
28	(Germany) Elia Weiss							24	20	28	20	13	16	0
29	(Kyrgyzstan) Georgy Zhuravskiy	Ret	16	13										0
30	(United States) Chloe Chambers **(F)**				21	17	13	22	26	20				0
31	(Germany) Mathilda Paatz **(F)**	14	Ret	18	16	21	18	16	27	26	18	14	26	0
32	(Denmark) Alba Hurup Larsen **(F)**	15	15	19	Ret	30†	21	14	21	17				0
33	(Israel) Guy Albag				14	18	19							0
34	(Australia) Joanne Ciconte **(F)**	19	20	22	Ret	26	16							0
35	(Norway) Marcus Sæter							18	17	19				0
36	(Italy) Ginevra Panzeri **(F)**							19	25	24	22	Ret	17	0
37	(Poland) Kornelia Olkucka **(F)**	23	22	27	20	28	25	21	28	29	24	22	20	0
38	(Australia) Aiva Anagnostiadis **(F)**	20	24	26										0
39	(Brazil) Ricardo Baptista				26†	25	23							0
Guest drivers ineligible to score points
	(Italy) Davide Larini										5	24	10	
	(Italy) Ludovico Busso										14	17	14	
	(United Kingdom) Emily Cotty **(F)**										15	18	23	
	(Mexico) Javier Herrera										25†	19	21	
Pos	Driver	(Portugal) POR			(Spain) CRT			(Spain) ARA			(Spain) CAT			Pts

Colour	Result
Gold	Winner
Silver	Second place
Bronze	Third place
Green	Points classification
Blue	Non-points classification
Blue	Non-classified finish (NC)
Purple	Retired, not classified (Ret)
Red	Did not qualify (DNQ)
Red	Did not pre-qualify (DNPQ)
Black	Disqualified (DSQ)
White	Did not start (DNS)
White	Withdrew (WD)
White	Race cancelled (C)
Blank	Did not practice (DNP)
Blank	Did not arrive (DNA)
Blank	Excluded (EX)

**Bold** – Pole

Italics – Fastest Lap

† — Did not finish, but classified

Rookie

**(F)** - Female Driver Trophy

=== Teams' championship ===
Pos	Team	(Portugal) POR			(Spain) CRT			(Spain) ARA			(Spain) CAT			Pts
1	(Germany) US Racing	1	1	3	1	1	2	1	2	2	3	5	1	405
1	(Germany) US Racing	3	2	5	3	3	4	2	3	3	6	7	4	405
2	(United Kingdom) Hitech TGR	2	5	1	2	2	1	3	1	1	1	1	2	346
2	(United Kingdom) Hitech TGR	5	10	2	7	8	8	6	6	11	2	2	8	346
3	(Switzerland) Jenzer Motorsport	7	7	6	8	11	6	7	5	6	4	3	3	152
3	(Switzerland) Jenzer Motorsport	15	8	7	9	12	9	8	15	7	7	4	5	152
4	(Netherlands) Van Amersfoort Racing	9	3	15	5	5	3	4	4	4	13	12	12	115
4	(Netherlands) Van Amersfoort Racing	17	17	23	6	7	5	13	9	13	19	23	13	115
5	(Switzerland) Maffi Racing	8	14	24	18	20	12	15	19	21	16	20	7	10
5	(Switzerland) Maffi Racing	12	19	25	20	28	25	21	23	27	17	21	20	10
6	(Slovenia) AS Motorsport	11	9	16	12	19	18	11	12	10	10	8	15	9
6	(Slovenia) AS Motorsport	14	18	18	13	21	29†	17	13	12	18	14	26	9
7	(Austria) Renauer Motorsport	26†	12	14	17	27	27	Ret	18	8	DNS	11	18	4
8	(Italy) Cram Motorsport	20	24	17	26†	23	23	10	20	15	20	13	16	1
8	(Italy) Cram Motorsport	22	Ret	26	Ret	25	28†	24	22	28				1
9	(Spain) Campos Racing	13	13	12	21	15	13	12	24	20				0
9	(Spain) Campos Racing	16	Ret	20	Ret	17	24	22	26	23				0
10	(San Marino) AKM Motorsport	19	16	13	14	18	16	18	17	19	5	24	10	0
10	(San Marino) AKM Motorsport	Ret	20	22	Ret	26	19	19	25	24	22	Ret	17	0
Pos	Team	(Portugal) POR			(Spain) CRT			(Spain) ARA			(Spain) CAT			Pts
