= Abdullah Kamel =

Saudi Arabian racing driver (born 2008)

- Kamel in 2026
- Nationality: (Saudi Arabia) Saudi
- Born: 24 August 2008 (age 18) Jeddah, Saudi Arabia

Previous series
- 2025: F4 Middle East Championship

Abdullah Ayman Kamel (Arabic: عبدالله أيمن كامل; born 24 August 2008) is a Saudi racing driver who competes in the F4 Saudi Arabian Championship.

Kamel is managed and coached by Jordanian racing driver Hamza Dirani.

== Career ==
Born and raised in Jeddah, Kamel took on karting in 2022 and won the Saudi Arabian Karting title in the IAME Junior class on debut and in 2023, as well as clinching the Saudi IAME title in the Senior category the same year. Primarily racing in Saudi Arabia during his karting career, Kamel also won the 2023 and 2023–24 Saudi Karting Championship in the Senior Max class, as well as the Saudi Games in the Senior category in both 2023 and 2024. Internationally, Kamel competed in the 2023 IAME Warriors Final, before making an appearance in the following year's RMC Grand Finals, both in their respective senior classes.

During 2024, Kamel began attending the Winfield Racing School ahead of his single-seater debut, which came in the following year's F4 Middle East Championship, in which he drove for Xcel Motorsport. In the five-round season, Kamel scored a best result of 15th in race one of the second Abu Dhabi round of the season en route to 26th in overall points. Moving to Europe for the summer, Kamel drove for AKM Motorsport in the E4 Championship, in which he took a best result of 13th in race three at Le Castellet. For the rest of the year, Kamel joined the Hitech centrally-run F4 Saudi Arabian Championship. In the series' relaunch, Kamel achieved his maiden career podium in the third Jeddah round to end the year seventh in overall points.

At the start of 2026, Kamel returned to AKM Motorsport to compete in the Formula Winter Series. Competing in the first three rounds, Kamel took a best result of ninth in a wet race three at Estoril, but skipped the remaining rounds owing to the 2026 Iran war disrupting flights across the Middle East. Later that year, Kamel returned to the team for a partial campaign in the E4 Championship. Towards the end of the year, Kamel returned to the F4 Saudi Arabian Championship, in which he took his second career podium at the second Jeddah round.

== Karting record ==
=== Karting career summary ===
Season	Series	Team	Position
2023	IAME Euro Series – X30 Senior		117th
2023	IAME Warriors Final – X30 Senior	VictoryLane	NC
2024	IAME Euro Series – X30 Senior	Tellone Motorsport	65th
2024	RMC Grand Finals – Senior Max	Creative Tracks	48th

== Racing record ==
=== Career summary ===
Season	Series	Team	Races	Wins	Poles	F/Laps	Podiums	Points	Position
2025	F4 Middle East Championship	Xcel Motorsport	15	0	0	0	0	0	26th
2025	E4 Championship	AKM Motorsport	9	0	0	0	0	0	29th
2025	F4 Saudi Arabian Championship	Astop	10	0	0	0	1	73	7th
2026	Formula Winter Series	AKM Motorsport	9	0	0	0	0	2	28th
2026	E4 Championship	AKM Motorsport	3	0	0	0	0	0	44th
2026	F4 Saudi Arabian Championship	Iconna						*	*

=== Complete F4 Middle East Championship results ===
(key) (Races in bold indicate pole position; races in italics indicate fastest lap)

Year	Team	1	2	3	4	5	6	7	8	9	10	11	12	13	14	15	DC	Points
2025	Xcel Motorsport	YMC1; 1; 24	YMC1; 2; 21	YMC1; 3 Ret	YMC2; 1; 15	YMC2; 2; 18	YMC2; 3; 22	DUB; 1 Ret	DUB; 2; 18	DUB; 3 Ret	YMC3; 1; 25†	YMC3; 2; 17	YMC3; 3; 18	LUS; 1; 18	LUS; 2; 20	LUS; 3; 19	26th	0

=== Complete E4 Championship results ===
(key) (Races in bold indicate pole position; races in italics indicate fastest lap)

Year	Team	1	2	3	4	5	6	7	8	9	DC	Points
2025	AKM Motorsport	LEC; 1; 16	LEC; 2; 21	LEC; 3; 13	MUG; 1; 25	MUG; 2; 31	MUG; 3; 27	MNZ; 1; 23	MNZ; 2; 18	MNZ; 3; 25	29th	0
2026	AKM Motorsport	MUG; 1	MUG; 2	MUG; 3	LEC; 1; 30	LEC; 2; 28	LEC; 3; 23	MNZ; 1	MNZ; 2	MNZ; 3	44th	0

=== Complete F4 Saudi Arabian Championship results ===
(key) (Races in bold indicate pole position) (Races in italics indicate fastest lap)

Year	Team	1	2	3	4	5	6	7	8	9	10	11	12	DC	Points
2025	Astop	BHR1; 1; 4	BHR1; 2; 8	BHR2; 1; 7	BHR2; 2; 7	JED1; 1; 8	JED1; 2; 5	JED2; 1; 8	JED2; 2; 5	JED3; 1; 9	JED3; 2; 3			7th	73
2026	Iconna	JED1; 1; 14	JED1; 2; 11	JED2; 1; 2	JED2; 2; 6	BHR1; 1	BHR1; 2	BHR2; 1	BHR2; 2	LUS1; 1	LUS1; 2	LUS2; 1	LUS2; 2	6th*	26*

=== Complete Formula Winter Series results ===
(key) (Races in bold indicate pole position; races in italics indicate fastest lap)

Year	Entrant	1	2	3	4	5	6	7	8	9	10	11	12	13	14	15	Pos	Points
2026	AKM Motorsport	EST; 1; 31†	EST; 2; 28	EST; 3; 9	POR; 1; 29	POR; 2; 24	POR; 3; 22	CRT; 1; 22	CRT; 2; 12	CRT; 3; 19	ARA; 1	ARA; 2	ARA; 3	CAT; 1	CAT; 2	CAT; 3	28th	2
