= E4 Championship =

Single-seater racing championship

- Category: FIA Formula 4
- Region: Europe
- Inaugural season: 2023
- Constructors: Tatuus
- Engine suppliers: Abarth
- Tyre suppliers: Pirelli
- Drivers' champion: (Japan) Kean Nakamura-Berta
- Teams' champion: (Italy) Prema Racing
- Official website: Official website

Euro 4 Championship, known since 2025 as the E4 Championship, is a formula racing series regulated according to FIA Formula 4 regulations. The championship was inaugurated in 2023 and was designed to provide more racing opportunities for teams and drivers in Italian F4 Championship after the folding of ADAC Formula 4.

== History ==
The series is run by ACI and promoted by ACI Sport and WSK Promotions, the latter is well known for running prominent karting championships including the WSK Euro Series. The series was confirmed when the calendar for the inaugural season was announced in April 2023, with three rounds supporting the Formula Regional European Championship.

The series faced minor challenges in its first year, after results for the second race in Monza were frozen for a month due to confusion over one marshal post showing a safety car board when no safety car had officially been called. Nonetheless, the series showed close racing and a title fight with only a two-point gap going into the final race, where Ugo Ugochukwu was declared the inaugural champion.

The 2024 season saw Akshay Bohra, who won two races in the opening round, take victory after title rival Freddie Slater was affected by post-race penalties and damage in the final weekend.

Euro 4 was renamed to E4 prior to the 2025 season.

== Cars ==
The series uses the Tatuus F4-T421, the same car as Italian F4. It is built by Italian race car constructor Tatuus. The engine is a 1.4L turbocharged Abarth engine, and the tyres are provided by Pirelli.

== Champions ==
=== Drivers ===
Season	Driver	Team	Races	Poles	Wins	Podiums	Fastest laps	Points	Margin
2023	(United States) Ugo Ugochukwu	(Italy) Prema Racing	9	1	3	5	2	193	24
2024	(India) Akshay Bohra	(Germany) US Racing	9	3	2	4	1	124	18
2025	(Japan) Kean Nakamura-Berta	(Italy) Prema Racing	9	7	4	8	1	181	47
2026									

=== Teams ===
Season	Team	Poles	Wins	Podiums	Fastest laps	Points	Margin
2023	(Italy) Prema Racing	4	6	16	5	435	150
2024	(Italy) Prema Racing	4	4	11	4	273	29
2025	(Italy) Prema Racing	7	5	11	4	308	92
2026							

=== Rookie Class ===
Season	Driver	Team	Poles	Wins (rookie)	Podiums	Fastest laps	Points (rookie)	Margin
2023	(United Kingdom) Akshay Bohra	(Germany) US Racing	2	3	4	1	180	10
2024	(Japan) Kean Nakamura-Berta	(Italy) Prema Racing	1	3	3	1	156	8
2025	(Ukraine) Oleksandr Bondarev	(Italy) Prema Racing	0	4	0	0	136	2
2026								

=== Woman Trophy ===
Season	Driver	Team	Poles	Wins (trophy)	Podiums	Fastest laps	Points (trophy)	Margin
2023	(Switzerland) Tina Hausmann	(San Marino) AKM Motorsport	0	6	9	0	222	7
2025	(United Kingdom) Emily Cotty	(France) R-ace GP	0	3	6	0	138	20
2026								

(not held in 2024)

== Circuits ==
- **Bold** denotes a circuit will be used in the 2026 season.
- **Italic** denotes a future circuit will be used in the 2027 season.

Number	Circuits	Rounds	Years
1	(Italy) **Monza Circuit**	4	2023–2026
2	(Italy) **Mugello Circuit**	3	2023–2025, 2027
3	(France) **Circuit Paul Ricard**	2	2025–present
4	(Spain) Circuit de Barcelona-Catalunya	1	2023
4	(Austria) Red Bull Ring	1	2024
4	(Italy) **Vallelunga Circuit**	1	2026
7	(Italy) **Imola Circuit**	0	2027
