= 2021 Macau Grand Prix =

68th running of the Macau Grand Prix

Race details
Date	21 November 2021
Official name	68th Macau Grand Prix – SJM Formula 4 Macau Grand Prix
Location	Guia Circuit, Macau
Course	Temporary street circuit 6.120 km (3.803 mi)
Distance	Qualifying race 8 laps, 48.960 km (30.422 mi); Main race 12 laps, 73.440 km (45.634 mi)
- Qualifying race
Pole driver	Hon Chio Leong (MAC)	Smart Life Racing Team

Podium
First	Hon Chio Leong (MAC)	Smart Life Racing Team
Second	Wing Chung Chang (MAC)	Chengdu Tianfu International Circuit Team
Third	Sicheng Li (CHN)	Blackjack 21 Racing Team
- Main race
Pole driver	Hon Chio Leong (MAC)	Smart Life Racing Team

Podium
First	Hon Chio Leong (MAC)	Smart Life Racing Team
Second	Wing Chung Chang (MAC)	Chengdu Tianfu International Circuit Team
Third	Sicheng Li (CHN)	Blackjack 21 Racing Team

The 2021 Macau Grand Prix was a motor race for Formula 4 (F4) cars held on the streets of Macau on 21 November 2021. Just like in 2020, the race was an F4 event (rather than Formula Three), and was part of the Fédération Internationale de l'Automobile (FIA)-administered China Formula 4 Championship for the second time running. The event consisted of two races; an eight-lap qualifying race deciding the starting grid for the twelve-lap main event. The 2021 race was the 68th running of the Macau Grand Prix, the second for F4 cars and the second meeting of the three-round 2021 F4 Chinese Championship.

== Background ==
After the 2020 Macau Grand Prix was run as a domestic Formula 4 event because of heavy quarantine restrictions introduced due to the COVID-19 pandemic, a return to holding the Grand Prix as a non-championship round of the FIA Formula 3 championship, just like in 2019, was originally planned. In August however, it was announced that there would be no Formula 3 competing in Macau for the second year running, with quarantine regulations still being very strictly enforced. This left the China Formula 4 Championship as the main event during the Macau Grand Prix weekend, staging the second of its three events at the Guia circuit.

== Entry list ==
All competitors used identical Mygale-chassis M14-F4 Formula 4 cars.

Team	No.	Driver
(China) Champ Motorsport	2	(Hong Kong) Patrick Tsang
(China) Champ Motorsport	5	(China) Chengru Hu
(China) iDEAK Racing by KRC	3	(Chinese Taipei) Lishin Peng
(China) iDEAK Racing by KRC	14	(Chinese Taipei) Brian Lee
(China) UMC Racing Team	4	(Macau) Mak Ka Lok
(China) UMC Racing Team	27	(Macau) Lei Kit Meng
(China) Chengdu Tianfu International Circuit Team	8	(Macau) Wing Chung Chang
(China) Chengdu Tianfu International Circuit Team	33	(China) Zhongyi Shang
(China) Smart Life Racing Team	9	(China) Lü Jingxi
(China) Smart Life Racing Team	11	(Macau) Hon Chio Leong
(China) Blackjack 21 Racing Team	17	(China) Sicheng Li
(Hong Kong) Grid Motorsport	23	(China) Neric Wei
(China) GEEKE XL DRIFT	48	(Hong Kong) James Wong
(China) GEEKE XL DRIFT	96	(China) Cao Li
(China) Ningbo International Circuit Team	56	(China) Zefeng Jing
(China) Ningbo International Circuit Team	99	(China) Lifeng Lin
(China) Henmax Motorsport	77	(Hong Kong) Yaoming Huang

== Results ==
=== Qualifying ===
Pos	No.	Driver	Team	Time	Grid
1	11	(Macau) Hon Chio Leong	Smart Life Racing Team	2:29.881	1
2	8	(Macau) Wing Chung Chang	Chengdu Tianfu International Circuit Team	2:30.870	2
3	17	(China) Sicheng Li	Blackjack 21 Racing Team	2:33.460	3
4	4	(Macau) Mak Ka Lok	UMC Racing Team	2:38.338	4
5	27	(Macau) Lei Kit Meng	UMC Racing Team	2:40.048	5
6	14	(Chinese Taipei) Brian Lee	iDEAK Racing by KRC	2:40.313	6
7	96	(China) Cao Li	GEEKE XL DRIFT	2:40.948	7
8	23	(China) Neric Wei	Grid Motorsport	2:41.311	8
9	33	(China) Zhongyi Shang	Chengdu Tianfu International Circuit Team	2:42.232	9
10	3	(Chinese Taipei) Lishin Peng	iDEAK Racing by KRC	2:42.259	10
11	99	(China) Lifeng Lin	Ningbo International Circuit Team	2:42.915	11
12	2	(Hong Kong) Patrick Tsang	Champ Motorsport	2:43.518	12
13	48	(Hong Kong) James Wong	GEEKE XL DRIFT	2:47.483	13
14	9	(China) Lü Jingxi	Smart Life Racing Team	2:49.255	14
15	77	(Hong Kong) Yaoming Huang	Henmax Motorsport	2:49.255	15
16	56	(China) Zefeng Jing	Ningbo International Circuit Team	No time	16

=== Qualifying race ===
Pos	No.	Driver	Team	Laps	Time/Retired	Grid
1	11	(Macau) Hon Chio Leong	Smart Life Racing Team	8	20min 15.950sec	1
2	8	(Macau) Wing Chung Chang	Chengdu Tianfu International Circuit Team	8	+ 5.424s	2
3	17	(China) Sicheng Li	Blackjack 21 Racing Team	8	+ 34.963s	3
4	56	(China) Zefeng Jing	Ningbo International Circuit Team	8	+ 46.630s	16
5	33	(China) Zhongyi Shang	Chengdu Tianfu International Circuit Team	8	+ 1:01.374s	9
6	96	(China) Cao Li	GEEKE XL DRIFT	8	+ 1:04.210s	7
7	4	(Macau) Mak Ka Lok	UMC Racing Team	8	+ 1:05.916s	4
8	9	(China) Lü Jingxi	Smart Life Racing Team	8	+ 1:13.489s	14
9	99	(China) Lifeng Lin	Ningbo International Circuit Team	8	+ 1:29.973s	11
10	77	(Hong Kong) Yaoming Huang	Henmax Motorsport	8	+ 1:50.939s	15
11	48	(Hong Kong) James Wong	GEEKE XL DRIFT	8	+ 2:05.554s	13
12	14	(Chinese Taipei) Brian Lee	iDEAK Racing by KRC	4	+ 4 laps	6
Ret	3	(Chinese Taipei) Lishin Peng	iDEAK Racing by KRC	4	Retired	10
Ret	27	(Macau) Lei Kit Meng	UMC Racing Team	0	Retired	5
Ret	23	(China) Neric Wei	Grid Motorsport	0	Retired	8
Ret	2	(Hong Kong) Patrick Tsang	Champ Motorsport	0	Retired	12

=== Main race ===
Pos	No.	Driver	Team	Laps	Time/Retired	Grid
1	11	(Macau) Hon Chio Leong	Smart Life Racing Team	12	30min 11.640sec	1
2	8	(Macau) Wing Chung Chang	Chengdu Tianfu International Circuit Team	12	+ 24.530s	2
3	17	(China) Sicheng Li	Blackjack 21 Racing Team	12	+ 50.069s	3
4	56	(China) Zefeng Jing	Ningbo International Circuit Team	12	+ 1:13.319s	4
5	96	(China) Cao Li	GEEKE XL DRIFT	12	+ 1:37.501s	6
6	33	(China) Zhongyi Shang	Chengdu Tianfu International Circuit Team	12	+ 1:44.727s	5
7	9	(China) Lü Jingxi	Smart Life Racing Team	12	+ 1:45.147s	8
8	14	(Chinese Taipei) Brian Lee	iDEAK Racing by KRC	12	+ 1:50.078s	12
9	23	(China) Neric Wei	Grid Motorsport	12	+ 2:23.339s	15
10	3	(Chinese Taipei) Lishin Peng	iDEAK Racing by KRC	12	+ 2:35.178s	13
11	4	(Macau) Mak Ka Lok	UMC Racing Team	12	+ 2:44.766s	7
12	27	(Macau) Lei Kit Meng	UMC Racing Team	11	+ 1 lap	14
13	48	(Hong Kong) James Wong	GEEKE XL DRIFT	11	+ 1 lap	11
14	99	(China) Lifeng Lin	Ningbo International Circuit Team	11	+ 1 lap	9
Ret	77	(Hong Kong) Yaoming Huang	Henmax Motorsport	0	Retired	10
Ret	2	(Hong Kong) Patrick Tsang	Champ Motorsport	0	Retired	16

== See also ==
- 2021 Macau Guia Race
