= Yu Kuai =

Chinese racing driver (born 2001)

Yu Kuai 余快
- Nationality: (China) Chinese
- Born: Yu Kuai; 28 January 2001 (age 25) Shanghai, China

GT World Challenge Asia career
- Debut season: 2023
- Current team: Audi Sport Asia Team Phantom
- Categorisation: FIA Silver
- Car number: 45

Championship titles
- 2025, 2026: GT World Challenge Asia – Silver

Chinese name
- Traditional Chinese: 余快
- Simplified Chinese: 余快

Yu Kuai (Chinese: 余快; pinyin: Yú Kuài; Jyutping: Jyu4 Faai3; born 28 January 2001 in Shanghai), also known as James Yu, is a Chinese racing driver who last competed for Audi Sport Asia Team Absolute in GT World Challenge Asia.

Yu is the 2023 Sepang 12 Hours winner and is also an Audi Sport Asia Young Driver.

== Early career ==
Born in Shanghai, Yu moved to Japan in 2011 to start his karting career, where he competed against Yuki Tsunoda, Marino Sato and Nirei Fukuzumi.

Stepping up to single-seaters in 2016, Yu competed in Formula Masters China for two years, in which he scored four wins which all came in 2017, three of which at the second Sepang round and the fourth win came at Zhuhai on his way to finishing fourth in the standings.

At the start of 2018, Yu joined Chase Owen Racing to compete in the 2018 F3 Asian Championship. Switching to Zen Motorsport for the rest of the season, Yu stayed with them as he returned to the series for two more seasons, where he scored a pole position at Sepang in 2019–20 but never scored a podium in his three-year tenure in the series.

Following the 2019–20 F3 Asian Championship, Yu was given the opportunity by Han Songting to compete in the Chinese GT Championship.

In 2021, Yu joined Team StarChase to compete in Porsche Carrera Cup Asia. Yu scored his first win at Ningbo and took two more wins at Zhuzhou to finish third in the standings.

== GT career ==
Yu began 2023 by winning the Sepang 12 Hours with Absolute Racing, and remained with them for his first full season in GT World Challenge Asia, alongside Andrew Haryanto. In his first year in the series, Yu achieved his maiden win in GT3 competition at Motegi, and also scored his second win in the final round at Sepang in race one after starting from pole. Yu ended the season eighth overall and sixth in the pro-am standings.

Yu returned to GT World Challenge Asia and Absolute Racing for the 2024 season, pairing up with Akash Nandy. Scoring two poles in his second season in GT World Challenge Asia, Yu achieved his third overall win in the series at the penultimate round of the season at Okayama in race one. At season's end, Yu was eighth overall and third in the Silver standings. At the end of 2024, Yu made his debut at Macau, racing in the FIA GT World Cup for Uno Racing Team. Yu finished 20th in his maiden outing at the street circuit.

The following year, Yu switched to Phantom Global Racing to race alongside Franky Cheng Congfu, scoring an overall win at Buriram and three more class wins to secure the Silver Cup title at season's end. Kuai remained with the team for 2026, as he was paired up with Cheng for the second consecutive season. The Chinese duo took overall wins at Mandalika and Okayama, as well as a class win in Beijing to clinch their second consecutive Silver Cup title.

== Education ==
Yu studied at Mander Portman Woodward for his A-Levels from 2018 to 2020, where he received an A* in Sociology and A in both Mathematics and Physics. He currently studies at the Faculty of Environment and Information Studies at Keio University. He has graduated from King’s College London with a bachelor's degree with Honours in Philosophy.

== Racing record ==
=== Racing career summary ===
Season	Series	Team	Races	Wins	Poles	F/Laps	Podiums	Points	Position
2016	Formula Masters China	Super License Team	15	0	0	0	1	94	5th
2017	Formula Masters China	Absolute Racing	18	4	5	2	5	139	4th
2018	F3 Asian Championship	Chase Owen Racing	3	0	0	0	0	84	7th
2018	F3 Asian Championship	Zen-Motorsport	9	0	0	0	0	84	7th
2019	F3 Asian Championship	Zen-Motorsport	15	0	0	0	0	54	8th
2019–20	F3 Asian Championship	Zen-Motorsport	15	0	1	0	0	70	9th
2021	Porsche Carrera Cup Asia	Team StarChase	14	3	6	0	7	255	**3rd**
2022	China Endurance Championship	Absolute Racing							
2023	Sepang 12 Hours	Absolute Racing	1	1	1	0	1	N/A	**1st**
2023	GT World Challenge Asia – GT3	Audi Sport Asia Team Absolute	12	2	1	0	2	90	8th
2023	GT World Challenge Asia – GT3 Pro-Am	Audi Sport Asia Team Absolute	12	2	1	0	2	96	6th
2024	GT World Challenge Asia	Audi Sport Asia Team Absolute	12	1	2	0	3	70	8th
2024	GT World Challenge Asia – Silver	Audi Sport Asia Team Absolute	12	3	7	0	10	189	**3rd**
2024	FIA GT World Cup	Uno Racing Team	1	0	0	0	0	—N/a	20th
2025	GT World Challenge Asia	FAW Audi Sport Asia Team Phantom	12	1	2	0	2	80	8th
2025	GT World Challenge Asia – Silver	FAW Audi Sport Asia Team Phantom	12	4	6	0	10	211	**1st**
2025	China GT Championship – GT3	610 Racing	2	0	0	0	2	33	13th
2025	Shanghai 8 Hours – GT3 Silver-Am	326 Racing Team	1	0	0	0	0	—N/a	**3rd**
2026	GT World Challenge Asia	FAW Audi Sport Asia Team Phantom	12	2	0	1	4	107	6th
2026	GT World Challenge Asia – Silver	FAW Audi Sport Asia Team Phantom	12	3	1	0	9	213	**1st**
2027	GT World Challenge Europe Endurance Cup	Team Motopark							
2027	GT World Challenge Europe Endurance Cup – Silver	Team Motopark							

=== Complete Formula Masters China results ===
(key) (Races in bold indicate pole position) (Races in italics indicate fastest lap)

Year	Entrant	1	2	3	4	5	6	7	8	9	10	11	12	13	14	15	16	17	18	DC	Points
2016	Super License Team	SHI; 1; 5	SHI; 2; 6	SHI; 3 Ret	ZHU; 1 Ret	ZHU; 2; 8	ZHU; 3; 8	CHA; 1; 5	CHA; 2; 4	CHA; 3; 5	SEP1; 1; 4	SEP1; 2; 3	SEP1; 3; 4	SEP2; 1; 5	SEP2; 2; 6	SEP2; 3; 5	PEN; 1	PEN; 2	PEN; 3	5th	94
2017	Absolute Racing	SEP1; 1 Ret	SEP1; 2; 5	SEP1; 3; 4	SEP1; 4; 4	**SEP2**; **1**; 1	SEP2; 2; 3	**SEP2**; **3**; 1	**SEP2**; **4**; 1	ZIC1; 1 Ret	ZIC1; 2 Ret	ZIC1; 3; 7	**ZIC2**; **1**; 1	ZIC2; 2; 4	ZIC2; 3; 6	SIC; 1; 10†	SIC; 2 DNS	SIC; 3; 8	SIC; 4; 8	4th	139

=== Complete F3 Asian Championship results ===
(key) (Races in bold indicate pole position) (Races in italics indicate fastest lap)

Year	Entrant	1	2	3	4	5	6	7	8	9	10	11	12	13	14	15	Pos	Points
2018	Chase Owen Racing	SEP1; 1; 13	SEP1; 2; 12	SEP1; 3; 5													7th	84
2018	Zen-Motorsport				NIS1; 1; 7	NIS1; 2; 4	NIS1; 3; 7	SIC; 1; 5	SIC; 2; 6	SIC; 3 Ret	NIS2; 1	NIS2; 2	NIS2; 3	SEP2; 1; 4	SEP2; 2; 4	SEP2; 3; 6	7th	84
2019	Zen-Motorsport	SEP; 1; 11	SEP; 2; 11	SEP; 3; 11	CHA; 1; 10	CHA; 2; 6	CHA; 3; 5	SUZ; 1; 10	SUZ; 2; 8	SUZ; 3; 6	SIC1; 1; 8	SIC1; 2; 11	SIC1; 3; 9	SIC2; 1; 6	SIC2; 2; 7	SIC2; 3; 9	8th	54
2019–20	Zen-Motorsport	**SEP1**; **1**; 9	SEP1; 2; 6	SEP1; 3; 4	DUB; 1; 15	DUB; 2; 8	DUB; 3; 16	ABU; 1; 11	ABU; 2; 7	ABU; 3; 11	SEP2; 1; 8	SEP2; 2; 7	SEP2; 3; 8	CHA; 1; 9	CHA; 2; 7	CHA; 3; 9	9th	70

=== Complete GT World Challenge Asia results ===
(key) (Races in bold indicate pole position) (Races in italics indicate fastest lap)

Year	Team	Car	Class	1	2	3	4	5	6	7	8	9	10	11	12	DC	Points
2023	Audi Sport Asia Team Absolute	Audi R8 LMS Evo II	Pro-Am	BUR; 1; 7	BUR; 2; 14	FSW; 1; 9	FSW; 2; 5	SUZ; 1; 4	SUZ; 2; 7	MOT; 1; 1	MOT; 2 Ret	OKA; 1; 5	OKA; 2; 18	SEP; 1; 1	SEP; 2; 11	6th	96
2024	FAW Audi Sport Asia Racing Team	Audi R8 LMS Evo II	Silver	**SEP**; **1**; 1	SEP; 2; 3	BUR; 1; 2	BUR; 2; 2	**FSW**; **1** Ret	FSW; 2; 1	SUZ; 1; 3	SUZ; 2; 1	OKA; 1; 2	OKA; 2; 1	SIC; 1; 2	**SIC**; **2**; 2	3rd	189
2025	FAW Audi Sport Asia Team Phantom	Audi R8 LMS Evo II	Silver	**SEP**; **1**; 1	**SEP**; **2**; 1	**MAN**; **1**; 3	MAN; 2; 4	BUR; 1; 1	**BUR**; **2**; 2	FUJ; 1; 1	**FUJ**; **2** Ret	OKA; 1; 2	**OKA**; **2**; 2	BEI; 1; 3	BEI; 2; 3	1st	211
2026	FAW Audi Sport Asia Team Phantom	Audi R8 LMS Evo II	Silver	SEP; 1; 2	SEP; 2; 4	MAN; 1; 1	MAN; 2; 4	FUJ; 1; 2	FUJ; 2; 3	OKA; 1; 1	**OKA**; **2**; 2	BEI; 1; 4	BEI; 2; 1	SHA; 1; 3	SHA; 2; 2	1st	213
