= Wing Chung Chang =

Macau racing driver

Wing Chung Chang 鄭頴聰
- Nationality: Macau
- Born: 26 October 1996 (age 30) Portuguese Macau

F4 Chinese Championship career
- Debut season: 2020
- Starts: 18
- Wins: 3
- Podiums: 15
- Poles: 2
- Fastest laps: 5
- Best finish: 1st in 2021

Previous series
- 2014 2015 - 2016: British Formula 3 International Series; FIA Formula 3 European Championship

Championship titles
- 2021 2022: F4 Chinese; Macau Grand Prix

Wing Chung "Andy" Chang (Chinese: 鄭頴聰, born 26 October 1996 in Macau) is a retired racing driver from Macau. He formerly competed in the F4 Chinese Championship and the FIA Formula 3 European Championship.

Chang finished second in his home race the Macau Grand Prix twice in successive years, both times losing to Charles Leong.

On 20 November 2022, Chang won his first Macau Grand Prix.

== Karting record ==
=== Karting career summary ===
Season	Series	Team	Position
2008	ROK Cup International Final — Mini ROK		16th
2009	AAMC Karting Championship — Senior Rotax Max		?
2009	Asian Karting Open Championship — Rotax Max Junior	AAMC	?
2009	Asian Karting Open Championship — Formula 125 Open Junior		?
2010	Asian Karting Open Championship — Formula 125 Open Junior		16th
2010	Asian Karting Open Championship — Rotax Max Junior	Fast Motor	?
2010	CIK-FIA Asia-Pacific Championship — KF3	Fast Motor	6th
2010	Bridgestone Cup International Final — Junior ROK		6th
2010	CIK-FIA Karting Academy Trophy		27th
2011	Asian Karting Open Championship — 125 Junior	AAMC Team/Fiorillo Maurizio	?
2011	CIK-FIA Asia-Pacific Championship — KF3	Fast Motor	7th
2011	CIK-FIA European Championship — KF3	Ward Racing	?
2011	CIK-FIA Karting Academy Trophy		28th
2011	ROK Cup International Final — Junior ROK		5th
2012	CIK-FIA European Championship — KF2	Tony Kart Racing Team	48th
2012	WSK Euro Series — KF2	Tony Kart Racing Team	48th
2012	WSK Master Series — KF2	Tony Kart Racing Team	41st
2012	CIK-FIA World Championship — KF1	PACAC	12th
2012	CIK-FIA World Cup — KF2	ARTkart	10th
2012	WSK Final Cup — KF2		14th
2012	South Garda Winter Cup — KF2	Int. Karting Distributor	87th
2013	AAMC Karting Championship — KZ		?
2013	CIK-FIA European Championship — KF2	Tony Kart Racing Team	14th
2013	WSK Euro Series — KF	Tony Kart Racing Team	?
2013	WSK Master Series — KF	Tony Kart Racing Team	49th
2013	CIK-FIA World Championship — KF	Tony Kart Racing Team	35th
2013	South Garda Winter Cup — KF2	MPT Racing	8th
2016	CIK-FIA Asia-Pacific Championship — KZ	TM Racing	23rd
2016	CIK-FIA European Championship — KZ	CRG S.P.A.	23rd
2016	South Garda Winter Cup — KZ2	CRG S.P.A.	19th
2017	CIK-FIA World Championship — KZ	CRG S.P.A.	24th
2018	WSK Open Cup — KZ	CRG S.P.A.	30th
2021	AAMC Karting Championship — KZ		5th
2022	AAMC Karting Championship — KZ		7th
2022	Lotus Cup		NC
2024	Coca-Cola Cup		NC

== Racing record ==
=== Racing career summary ===
Season	Series	Team	Races	Wins	Poles	F/Laps	Podiums	Points	Position
2013	British Formula Ford Championship	Falcon Motorsport	6	0	0	0	0	0	NC†
2013	Formula Masters China	Eurasia Motorsport	3	0	0	0	0	0	NC†
2014	British Formula 3 International Series	Double R Racing	12	0	0	0	4	103	6th
2014	Zandvoort Masters	Double R Racing	1	0	0	0	0	N/A	10th
2014	Macau Grand Prix	Team West-Tec	2	0	0	0	0	N/A	19th
2015	FIA Formula 3 European Championship	Fortec Motorsport	15	0	0	0	0	0	36th
2015	Macau Grand Prix	Fortec Motorsport	2	0	0	0	0	N/A	14th
2016	FIA Formula 3 European Championship	ThreeBond with T-Sport	6	0	0	0	0	0	27th
2016	Macau Grand Prix	ThreeBond with T-Sport	2	0	0	0	0	N/A	12th
2019	Macau Touring Car Series — Greater Bay Area GT Cup	TopGun GT	2	0	0	0	0	0	13th
2020	F4 Chinese Championship	Chengdu Tianfu International Circuit Team	6	1	0	1	4	153	**2nd**
2020	Macau Grand Prix	Chengdu Tianfu International Circuit Team	2	0	0	1	2	N/A	**2nd**
2021	F4 Chinese Championship	Chengdu Tianfu International Circuit Team	10	1	1	2	9	254	**1st**
2021	Macau Grand Prix	Chengdu Tianfu International Circuit Team	2	0	0	0	2	N/A	**2nd**
2022	F4 Chinese Championship	Champ Motorsport	2	1	1	2	2	0	NC†
2022	Macau Grand Prix	Champ Motorsport	2	1	1	0	2	N/A	**1st**
2023	Macau Touring Car Series - Macau GT Challenge — GT4	778 Auto Sport	2	0	0	0	0	12	13th

^{†} As Chang was a guest driver, he was ineligible for points.

=== Complete British Formula 3 International Series results ===
(key) (Races in bold indicate pole position) (Races in italics indicate fastest lap)

Year	Entrant	1	2	3	4	5	6	7	8	9	10	11	12	13	14	15	16	17	18	19	20	21	DC	Points
2014	Double R Racing	ROC; 1; 3	ROC; 2; 6	ROC; 3; 3	SIL; 1; 4	SIL; 2 Ret	SIL; 3; 5	SNE; 1; 6	SNE; 2; 3	SNE; 3; 2	SPA; 1; 7	SPA; 2; 7	SPA; 3; 11	THR; 1	THR; 2	THR; 3	BRH; 1	BRH; 2	BRH; 3	DON; 1	DON; 2	DON; 3	6th	103

=== Complete Macau Grand Prix results ===
Year	Team	Car	Qualifying	Quali Race	Main race
2014	(United Kingdom) Team West-Tec F3	Dallara F312	27th	21st	19th
2015	(United Kingdom) Fortec Motorsport	Dallara F312	21st	18th	14th
2016	(Japan) ThreeBond with T-Sport	Dallara F316	24th	16th	12th
2020	(China) Chengdu Tianfu International Circuit Team	Mygale M14-F4	**3rd**	**2nd**	**2nd**
2021	(China) Chengdu Tianfu International Circuit Team	Mygale M14-F4	**2nd**	**2nd**	**2nd**
2022	(China) Champ Motorsport	Mygale M14-F4	**1st**	**3rd**	**1st**

=== Complete FIA Formula 3 European Championship results ===
(key) (Races in bold indicate pole position) (Races in italics indicate fastest lap)

Year	Entrant	Engine	1	2	3	4	5	6	7	8	9	10	11	12	13	14	15	16	17	18	19	20	21	22	23	24	25	26	27	28	29	30	31	32	33	DC	Points
2015	Fortec Motorsports	Mercedes	SIL; 1	SIL; 2	SIL; 3	HOC; 1	HOC; 2	HOC; 3	PAU; 1	PAU; 2	PAU; 3	MNZ; 1	MNZ; 2	MNZ; 3	SPA; 1	SPA; 2	SPA; 3	NOR; 1	NOR; 2	NOR; 3	ZAN; 1; 20	ZAN; 2; 26	ZAN; 3; 21	RBR; 1; 24	RBR; 2; 18	RBR; 3; 23	ALG; 1; 24	ALG; 2; 18	ALG; 3 Ret	NÜR; 1; 26	NÜR; 2 Ret	NÜR; 3 Ret	HOC; 1 Ret	HOC; 2; 18	HOC; 3; 20	36th	0
2016	ThreeBond with T-Sport	NBE	LEC; 1	LEC; 2	LEC; 3	HUN; 1	HUN; 2	HUN; 3	PAU; 1	PAU; 2	PAU; 3	RBR; 1	RBR; **2**	RBR; **3**	NOR; **1**	NOR; 2	NOR; 3	ZAN; 1	ZAN; 2	ZAN; 3	SPA; 1	SPA; 2	SPA; 3	NÜR; 1	NÜR; 2	NÜR; 3	IMO; 1; 14	IMO; 2; 14	IMO; 3; 16	HOC; 1; 17	HOC; 2; 19	HOC; 3; 17				27th	0

=== Complete F4 Chinese Championship results ===
(key) (Races in bold indicate pole position) (Races in italics indicate fastest lap)

Year	Entrant	1	2	3	4	5	6	7	8	9	10	11	12	13	14	Pos	Points
2020	Chengdu Tianfu International Circuit Team	ZIC1; 1	ZIC1; 2	ZIC1; 3	ZIC1; 4	ZIC2; 1; 6	ZIC2; 2 Ret	ZIC2; 3; 3	ZIC2; 4; 1	MAC; 1; 2	MAC; 2; 2					2nd	153
2021	Chengdu Tianfu International Circuit Team	ZIC; 1; 2	ZIC; 2; 3	ZIC; 3; 3	ZIC; 4; 2	MAC; 1; 2	MAC; 2; 2	NIC; 1; 3	NIC; 2; 1	**NIC**; **3**; 5	NIC; 4; 2					1st	254
2022	Champ Motorsport	NIC1; 1	NIC1; 2	NIC1; 3	NIC1; 4	NIC2; 1	NIC2; 2	NIC2; 3	NIC2; 4	**MAC**; **1**; 3	MAC; 2; 1	PIC; 1	PIC; 2	PIC; 3	PIC; 4	NC†	0

Sporting positions
Preceded by He Zijian	F4 Chinese Championship; Champion; 2021	Succeeded by Xie Wing Lam
Preceded by Hon Chio Leong	Macau Grand Prix; Winner; 2022	Succeeded by Luke Browning
