= 2016 Formula Masters China =

Seasons
- ← 2015 2017 →

The 2016 Formula Masters China season was the sixth season of the Formula Pilota China series, and the third under the Formula Masters China branding. The championship began on 21 May at Shanghai in China and concluded on 16 October at Penbay in Taiwan after fifteen races held at five meetings.

== Teams and drivers ==
Team	No.	Driver	Class	Rounds
(Philippines) Cebu Pacific Air by PRT	1	(South Korea) Kim Jeong-tae		All
(Philippines) Cebu Pacific Air by PRT	2	(Australia) Nick Rowe		1
(Philippines) Cebu Pacific Air by PRT	3	(China) "Jeffrey" Ye Junhui		1–2
(Philippines) Cebu Pacific Air by PRT	4	(Hong Kong) Thomas Swift		2–4
(Hong Kong) Absolute Racing	5	(Germany) Philip Hamprecht		All
(Hong Kong) Absolute Racing	6	(China) Zheng Shangguan		All
(China) Champ Motorsport	8	(Macau) Hon Chio Leong		2
(China) Champ Motorsport	9	(Hong Kong) Xie Ruilin		2
(China) DP Motorsport	8	(Macau) Hon Chio Leong		4–5
(China) DP Motorsport	9	(China) Hu Nan	M	4, 6
(China) DP Motorsport	23	(China) Liu Zexuan	M	4
(China) DP Motorsport	68	(Taiwan) Jacques Wang	M	6
(Japan) Super License Team	17	(China) Hong Shijie		All
(Japan) Super License Team	55	(Japan) Takashi Hata	M	All
(Japan) Super License Team	88	(China) "James" Yu Kuai		All
(Japan) Super License Team	91	(Taiwan) Huang Chi	M	6
(Philippines) Eurasia Motorsport	24	(Australia) Aidan Read		All
Amateur Cup	9	(China) Hu Nan	M	1
Amateur Cup	12	(China) Liu Wang		2
Amateur Cup	22	(China) Huang Hengyi		2
Amateur Cup	37	(Italy) Carlo Mantori	M	1
Amateur Cup	38	(Monaco) Philippe Prette	M	1
Amateur Cup	39	(Hong Kong) James Wong		1–2, 4
Amateur Cup	40	(France) Patrice Bonzom	M	1
Amateur Cup	48	(Italy) Angelo Negro	M	1, 5
Amateur Cup	99	(Thailand) Maekkasit Weraporasu	M	3

Icon	Meaning
M	Master class

== Race calendar and results ==
A provisional race calendar was released on 3 March 2016. An updated race calendar was released on 1 June 2016, which cancelled the round at Kuala Lumpur City Grand Prix. It was announced on 22 July that the Kuala Lumpur round will be replaced by a round at Sepang for the same weekend. After that round in Korea International Circuit was also changed by Sepang Circuit.

Round		Circuit	Date	Pole position	Fastest lap	Winning driver	Winning team
1	R1	(China) Shanghai International Circuit	21 May	(Australia) Nick Rowe	(South Korea) Kim Jeong-tae	(South Korea) Kim Jeong-tae	(Philippines) Cebu Pacific Air by PRT
1	R2	(China) Shanghai International Circuit	22 May		(Australia) Nick Rowe	(Australia) Nick Rowe	(Philippines) Cebu Pacific Air by PRT
1	R3	(China) Shanghai International Circuit	22 May	(Australia) Nick Rowe	(Germany) Philip Hamprecht	(Australia) Nick Rowe	(Philippines) Cebu Pacific Air by PRT
2	R1	(China) Zhuhai International Circuit	18 June	(Germany) Philip Hamprecht	(Germany) Philip Hamprecht	(Australia) Aidan Read	(Philippines) Eurasia Motorsport
2	R2	(China) Zhuhai International Circuit	18 June		(Australia) Aidan Read	(Germany) Philip Hamprecht	(Hong Kong) Absolute Racing
2	R3	(China) Zhuhai International Circuit	19 June	(Germany) Philip Hamprecht	(China) Zheng Shangguan	(Germany) Philip Hamprecht	(Hong Kong) Absolute Racing
3	R1	(Thailand) Chang International Circuit	23 July	(Australia) Aidan Read	(Australia) Aidan Read	(Australia) Aidan Read	(Philippines) Eurasia Motorsport
3	R2	(Thailand) Chang International Circuit	24 July		(Australia) Aidan Read	(Australia) Aidan Read	(Philippines) Eurasia Motorsport
3	R3	(Thailand) Chang International Circuit	24 July	(Germany) Philip Hamprecht	(Germany) Philip Hamprecht	(Germany) Philip Hamprecht	(Hong Kong) Absolute Racing
4	R1	(Malaysia) Sepang International Circuit	13 August	(Germany) Philip Hamprecht	(Germany) Philip Hamprecht	(Germany) Philip Hamprecht	(Hong Kong) Absolute Racing
4	R2	(Malaysia) Sepang International Circuit	13 August		(Germany) Philip Hamprecht	(Germany) Philip Hamprecht	(Hong Kong) Absolute Racing
4	R3	(Malaysia) Sepang International Circuit	14 August	(China) Zheng Shangguan	(China) Zheng Shangguan	(China) Zheng Shangguan	(Hong Kong) Absolute Racing
5	R1	(Malaysia) Sepang International Circuit	3 September	(Australia) Aidan Read	(Australia) Aidan Read	(Australia) Aidan Read	(Philippines) Eurasia Motorsport
5	R2	(Malaysia) Sepang International Circuit	4 September		(Australia) Aidan Read	(Australia) Aidan Read	(Philippines) Eurasia Motorsport
5	R3	(Malaysia) Sepang International Circuit	4 September	(Germany) Philip Hamprecht	(Australia) Aidan Read	(Australia) Aidan Read	(Philippines) Eurasia Motorsport
6	R1	(Taiwan) Penbay International Circuit	15 October	(Germany) Philip Hamprecht	(Australia) Aidan Read	(Australia) Aidan Read	(Philippines) Eurasia Motorsport
6	R2	(Taiwan) Penbay International Circuit	16 October		(Australia) Aidan Read	(Australia) Aidan Read	(Philippines) Eurasia Motorsport
6	R3	(Taiwan) Penbay International Circuit	16 October	(Germany) Philip Hamprecht	(Australia) Aidan Read	(Australia) Aidan Read	(Philippines) Eurasia Motorsport

== Championship standings ==
=== Scoring system ===
Points for are awarded as follows:

Position	1st	2nd	3rd	4th	5th	6th	7th	8th	9th	10th	PP
Races 1 & 3	20	15	12	10	8	6	4	3	2	1	1
Race 2	12	10	8	6	4	3	2	1	0		1

=== Drivers' championship ===
Pos.	Driver	SHI (China)			ZHU (China)			CHA (Thailand)			SEP1 (Malaysia)			SEP2 (Malaysia)			PEN (Taiwan)			Pts
1	(Germany) Philip Hamprecht	3	2	2	**2**	**1**	**1**	3	6	**1**	**1**	**1**	2	3	3	**2**				224
2	(Australia) Aidan Read	4	3	3	1	2	Ret	**1**	**1**	3	6	DNS	DNS	**1**	1	1	1	1	1	186
3	(China) Zheng Shangguan	2	10	4	Ret	3	2	2	2	2	2	2	**1**	4	2	Ret	2		3	154
4	(South Korea) Kim Jeong-tae	1	**4**	5	3	4	9	4	3	4	5	7	3	2	7	Ret	3	2	2	134
5	(China) Yu Kuai	5	6	Ret	Ret	8	8	5	4	5	4	3	4	5	6	5				94
6	(China) Hong Shijie	8	9	8	7	7	5	7	5	6	8	6	5	6	5	4		3		64
7	(Macau) Hon Chio Leong				4	5	4				3	5	Ret	8	4	3				61
8	(Japan) Takashi Hata	Ret	8	7	6	9	6	6	9	Ret	7	4	6	7	8	6				50
9	(Australia) Nick Rowe	**7**	1	**1**																38
10	(China) Ye Junhui	10	5	6	5	6	3													34
11	(Hong Kong) Thomas Swift				Ret	11	DSQ	8	8	Ret	Ret	Ret	7							8
12	(Italy) Angelo Negro	6	12	10										Ret	DNS	DNS				7
13	(Italy) Carlo Mantori	9	7	9																6
14	(China) Hu Nan	13	14	DNS							9	8	8							6
15	(Hong Kong) Xie Ruilin				Ret	DNS	7													4
16	(China) Huang Hengyi				8	13	10													4
17	(Hong Kong) James Wong	Ret	NC	NC	10	12	DNS				10	Ret	10							3
18	(Thailand) Maekkasit Weraporasu							Ret	7	Ret										2
19	(China) Liu Zexuan										11	9	9							2
20	(China) Liu Wang				9	10	11													2
21	(France) Patrice Bonzom	12	11	11																0
22	(Monaco) Philippe Prette	11	13	12																0
Pos.	Driver	SHI (China)			ZHU (China)			CHA (Thailand)			SEP1 (Malaysia)			SEP2 (Malaysia)			PEN (Taiwan)			Pts

Colour	Result
Gold	Winner
Silver	Second place
Bronze	Third place
Green	Points classification
Blue	Non-points classification
Blue	Non-classified finish (NC)
Purple	Retired, not classified (Ret)
Red	Did not qualify (DNQ)
Red	Did not pre-qualify (DNPQ)
Black	Disqualified (DSQ)
White	Did not start (DNS)
White	Withdrew (WD)
White	Race cancelled (C)
Blank	Did not practice (DNP)
Blank	Did not arrive (DNA)
Blank	Excluded (EX)

**Bold** – Pole
Italics – Fastest Lap
† – Retired, but classified
