= 2017 F4 Chinese Championship =

Motor racing competition

The 2017 F4 Chinese Championship (Shell Cup FIA F4 Chinese Championship) was the third season of the F4 Chinese Championship. It began on 22 April at the Zhuhai International Circuit and concluded on 29 October at the new Ningbo International Circuit, after seven triple-header rounds, five of them co-hosted with the China Formula Grand Prix championship, and the remaining two being run as a support for the Chinese Touring Car Championship and, in Ningbo, for the World Touring Car Championship.

== Teams and drivers ==
Team	No.	Driver	Class	Rounds
(Hong Kong) BlackArts Racing Team	2	(Macau) Charles Leong		1–6
(Hong Kong) BlackArts Racing Team	3	(Monaco) Louis Prette		1
(Hong Kong) BlackArts Racing Team	6	(Australia) Josh Burdon		2
(Hong Kong) BlackArts Racing Team	58	(Germany) Yves Volte		3–7
(China) Geely Automobile Racing Team	4	(China) Wu Pei		5–7
(China) Champ Motorsport	7	(China) Ryan Liu		1–3
(China) Champ Motorsport	78	(Indonesia) David Sitanala		1
(China) Glory Master Team	9	(China) Feng Diyang		1–2
(China) Glory Racing Team	11	(China) Billy Zheng		All
(China) Glory Racing Team	20	(China) Tai Yi		1–6
(China) Glory Racing Team	55	(China) Zheng Wancheng		7
(China) MRS Motorsport	18	(China) Lin Taian		All
(China) MRS Motorsport	20	(China) Tai Yi		7
(China) MRS Motorsport	63	(Hong Kong) Xie Ruilin		1–5
(China) MRS Motorsport	91	(Colombia) Julio Acosta	G	6
(China) Ningbo International Circuit Team	21	(China) He Zijian		6
(China) Ningbo International Circuit Team	33	(China) Shang Zongyi		6
(Hong Kong) BlackArts Motorsport Team	23	(China) Daniel Cao		4
(Hong Kong) BlackArts Motorsport Team	77	(China) Ryan Liu		4
(China) Brother Racing Team	27	(China) Ren Wei		3
(China) Hunan International Circuit Team	39	(China) Chen Guanghui		6
(China) Friends Come From Far Away	47	(China) Chen Guanjun		6
(China) Friends Come From Far Away	55	(China) Zheng Wancheng		5
(China) Friends Come From Far Away	56	(China) Li Huiwei		4, 6
(China) Friends Come From Far Away	57	(China) Xi Xiuping		1–5, 7
(China) Friends Come From Far Away	66	(China) Liang Dong		7
(China) Friends Come From Far Away	76	(China) Zheng Shangguan		1
(China) Pǔtè Team	55	(China) Zheng Wancheng		6
(China) Pǔtè Team	99	(China) Feng Diyang		4–6

Icon	Class
G	Guest drivers ineligible to score points

== Race calendar ==
All rounds were held in China.

Round		Circuit	Date	Pole position	Fastest lap	Winning driver	Winning team	Supporting
1	R1	Zhuhai International Circuit, Zhuhai	22 April	(Macau) Hon Chio Leong	(Macau) Hon Chio Leong	(Macau) Hon Chio Leong	(Hong Kong) BlackArts Racing Team	China Formula Grand Prix
1	R2	Zhuhai International Circuit, Zhuhai	23 April		(China) Billy Zheng	(Macau) Hon Chio Leong	(Hong Kong) BlackArts Racing Team	China Formula Grand Prix
1	R3	Zhuhai International Circuit, Zhuhai	23 April		(China) Tai Yi	(China) Zheng Shangguan	(China) Friends Come From Far Away	China Formula Grand Prix
2	R1	Chengdu Goldenport Circuit, Chengdu	20 May	(Australia) Josh Burdon	(Australia) Josh Burdon	(Australia) Josh Burdon	(Hong Kong) BlackArts Racing Team	China Formula Grand Prix
2	R2	Chengdu Goldenport Circuit, Chengdu	21 May		(Australia) Josh Burdon	(Australia) Josh Burdon	(Hong Kong) BlackArts Racing Team	China Formula Grand Prix
2	R3	Chengdu Goldenport Circuit, Chengdu	21 May		(Australia) Josh Burdon	(Australia) Josh Burdon	(Hong Kong) BlackArts Racing Team	China Formula Grand Prix
3	R1	Goldenport Park Circuit, Beijing	24 June	(Macau) Hon Chio Leong	(Macau) Hon Chio Leong	(Macau) Hon Chio Leong	(Hong Kong) BlackArts Racing Team	China Formula Grand Prix
3	R2	Goldenport Park Circuit, Beijing	25 June		(Macau) Hon Chio Leong	(Macau) Hon Chio Leong	(Hong Kong) BlackArts Racing Team	China Formula Grand Prix
3	R3	Goldenport Park Circuit, Beijing	25 June		(Macau) Hon Chio Leong	(Macau) Hon Chio Leong	(Hong Kong) BlackArts Racing Team	China Formula Grand Prix
4	R1	Shanghai International Circuit, Shanghai	4 August	(China) Daniel Cao	(Macau) Hon Chio Leong	(Macau) Hon Chio Leong	(Hong Kong) BlackArts Racing Team	2017 China Touring Car Championship
4	R2	Shanghai International Circuit, Shanghai	5 August		(China) Billy Zheng	(Macau) Hon Chio Leong	(Hong Kong) BlackArts Racing Team	2017 China Touring Car Championship
4	R3	Shanghai International Circuit, Shanghai	5 August		Race abandoned due to heavy rain			2017 China Touring Car Championship
5	R1	Shanghai International Circuit, Shanghai	16 September	(Macau) Hon Chio Leong	(Macau) Hon Chio Leong	(Macau) Hon Chio Leong	(Hong Kong) BlackArts Racing Team	China Formula Grand Prix
5	R2	Shanghai International Circuit, Shanghai	17 September		(Macau) Hon Chio Leong	(Macau) Hon Chio Leong	(Hong Kong) BlackArts Racing Team	China Formula Grand Prix
5	R3	Shanghai International Circuit, Shanghai	17 September		(Germany) Yves Volte	(Germany) Yves Volte	(Hong Kong) BlackArts Racing Team	China Formula Grand Prix
6	R1	Ningbo International Circuit, Ningbo	14 October	(Colombia) Julio Acosta	(Macau) Hon Chio Leong	(Macau) Hon Chio Leong	(Hong Kong) BlackArts Racing Team	World Touring Car Championship 2017 China Touring Car Championship
6	R2	Ningbo International Circuit, Ningbo	15 October		(Macau) Hon Chio Leong	(Macau) Hon Chio Leong	(Hong Kong) BlackArts Racing Team	World Touring Car Championship 2017 China Touring Car Championship
6	R3	Ningbo International Circuit, Ningbo	15 October		(Colombia) Julio Acosta	(Colombia) Julio Acosta	(China) MRS Motorsport	World Touring Car Championship 2017 China Touring Car Championship
7	R1	Ningbo International Circuit, Ningbo	28 October	(China) Billy Zheng	(China) Billy Zheng	(China) Billy Zheng	(China) Glory Racing Team	China Formula Grand Prix
7	R2	Ningbo International Circuit, Ningbo	29 October		(Germany) Yves Volte	(China) Billy Zheng	(China) Glory Racing Team	China Formula Grand Prix
7	R3	Ningbo International Circuit, Ningbo	29 October		(China) Lin Taian	(China) Lin Taian	(China) MRS Motorsport	China Formula Grand Prix

== Championship standings ==
Points were awarded as follows:

Position	**1st**	**2nd**	**3rd**	**4th**	**5th**	**6th**	**7th**	**8th**	**9th**	**10th**
Points	25	18	15	12	10	8	6	4	2	1

=== Drivers' Championship ===
Pos	Driver	ZIC			CGC			BGP			SIC1			SIC2			NIC1			NIC2			Pts
1	(Macau) Charles Leong	**1**	1	4	Ret	2	3	**1**	1	1	1	1	C	**1**	1	Ret	1	1	2				345
2	(China) Billy Zheng	5	4	5	2	3	2	4	8	3	Ret	4	C	3	3	Ret	3	Ret	6	**1**	1	3	246
3	(China) Lin Taian	2	2	Ret	3	6	4	Ret	6	5	3	2	C	4	4	5	5	3	8	3	3	1	242
4	(Germany) Yves Volte							2	2	2	2	5	C	2	2	1	2	2	3	4	2	4	239
5	(China) Tai Yi	7	6	3	5	4	6	Ret	3	Ret	6	6	C	8	6	2	6	Ret	9	7	6	5	156
6	(Hong Kong) Xie Ruilin	6	5	2	4	Ret	5	3	4	4	5	7	C	6	5	Ret							131
7	(China) Zheng Wancheng													5	7	4	4	11	5	2	4	2	101
8	(Australia) Josh Burdon				**1**	1	1																75
9	(China) Xi Xiuping	8	8	DSQ	7	5	8	Ret	Ret	Ret	7	10	C	7	9	3				5	8	Ret	72
10	(China) Wu Pei													9	8	6	10	9	10	6	5	6	47
11	(China) Ryan Liu	11	9	Ret	6	Ret	7	Ret	5	6	10	8	C										39
12	(Indonesia) David Sitanala	3	3	DNS																			30
13	(China) Feng Diyang	10	10	7	8	Ret	9				9	Ret	C	Ret	10	7	Ret	8	12				29
14	(China) Li Huiwei										8	9	C				8	5	7				28
15	(China) Zheng Shangguan	9	11	1																			27
16	(China) Daniel Cao										**4**	3	C										27
17	(Monaco) Louis Prette	4	7	6																			26
18	(China) He Zijian																9	6	4				25
19	(China) Shang Zongyi																7	4	Ret				18
20	(China) Ren Wei							5	7	Ret													16
21	(China) Liang Dong																			8	7	Ret	10
22	(China) Chen Guanghui																Ret	10	11				3
23	(China) Chen Guanjun																11	Ret	13				0
Guest drivers ineligible for championship points
	(Colombia) Julio Acosta																Ret	7	1				
Pos	Driver	ZIC			CGC			BGP			SIC1			SIC2			NIC1			NIC2			Pts

Colour	Result
Gold	Winner
Silver	Second place
Bronze	Third place
Green	Points classification
Blue	Non-points classification
Blue	Non-classified finish (NC)
Purple	Retired, not classified (Ret)
Red	Did not qualify (DNQ)
Red	Did not pre-qualify (DNPQ)
Black	Disqualified (DSQ)
White	Did not start (DNS)
White	Withdrew (WD)
White	Race cancelled (C)
Blank	Did not practice (DNP)
Blank	Did not arrive (DNA)
Blank	Excluded (EX)

**Bold** – Pole
Italics – Fastest Lap

=== Teams' Cup ===
Pos	Team	Points
1	(Hong Kong) BlackArts Racing Team	685
2	(China) Glory Racing Team	426
3	(China) MRS Motorsport	397
4	(China) Friends Come From Far Away	165
5	(China) Champ Motorsport	64
6	(China) Geely Automobile Racing Team	47
7	(China) Ningbo International Circuit Team	43
8	(China) Pǔtè Team	40
9	(Hong Kong) BlackArts Motorsport Team	32
10	(China) Brother Racing Team	16
11	(China) Glory Master Team	14
12	(China) Hunan International Circuit Team	3
