= 2021 F4 Chinese Championship =

Seventh season of F4 Chinese Championship

Seasons
- ← 2020 2022 →

The 2021 F4 Chinese Championship (Shell Helix FIA F4 Chinese Championship) was the seventh season of the F4 Chinese Championship. It began on 22 October at Zhuhai International Circuit and ended on 5 December at Ningbo International Circuit.

== Teams and drivers ==
Teams	No.	Drivers	Status	Rounds
(China) Champ Motorsport	2	(Hong Kong) Patrick Tsang	M	1–2
(China) Champ Motorsport	5	(China) Hu Chengru		All
(China) iDEAK Racing by KRC	3	(Chinese Taipei) Lishin Peng		2
(China) iDEAK Racing by KRC	14	(Chinese Taipei) Brian Lee	M	All
(China) iDEAK Racing by KRC	22	(China) Wang Zhongwei		1
(China) iDEAK Racing by KRC	55	(China) Ruan Cunfan		3
(China) UMC Racing Team	4	(Macau) Mak Ka Lok	G	2
(China) UMC Racing Team	27	(Macau) Lei Kit Meng	G	2
(China) Smart Life Racing Team	6	(China) Ryan Liu		1, 3
(China) Smart Life Racing Team	13	(China) Lü Yiyu	M	1
(China) Pointer Racing	7	(China) Fang Weiyuan		1
(China) Chengdu Tianfu International Circuit Team	8	(Macau) Andy Chang		All
(China) Chengdu Tianfu International Circuit Team	33	(China) Shang Zhonqyi		2
(China) Chengdu Tianfu International Circuit Team	95	(China) Zheng Hui	M	3
(China) Theodore Smart Life Racing Team	9	(China) Lü Jingxi		All
(China) Theodore Smart Life Racing Team	11	(Macau) Charles Leong	G	1–2
(China) Theodore Smart Life Racing Team	69	(United States) Michael Farrens	M	3
(China) Blackjack 21 Racing Team	10	(China) Liu Tiezheng		1
(China) Blackjack 21 Racing Team	17	(China) Li Sicheng		2–3
(Hong Kong) Grid Motorsport	23	(China) Neric Wei	G	1–2
(China) GEEKE XL DRIFT	24	(China) Xu Shenghui		3
(China) GEEKE XL DRIFT	32	(China) Li Sicheng		1
(China) GEEKE XL DRIFT	48	(Hong Kong) James Wong	M	All
(China) GEEKE XL DRIFT	96	(China) Li Chao	M	2
(China) LEO GEEKE Team	29	(China) Oscar Gao		3
(China) Ningbo International Circuit Team	56	(China) Jing Zefeng		2–3
(China) Ningbo International Circuit Team	99	(China) Lin Lifeng	G	2
(China) Henmax Motorsport	77	(Hong Kong) Wong Yuiming	M	1–2

Icon	Class
M	Drivers that compete for the Masters Championship
G	Guest drivers ineligible for Drivers' Championship

== Race calendar and results ==
The calendar featuring 4 rounds and 14 races was announced on 31 March. The date of the second round at Wuhan Street Circuit and double points for races at Guia Circuit were confirmed on 24 May. On 27 May, all the outdoor sports, including motorsports, were suspended in China until further notice in order to revise safety protocols in the aftermath of Gansu ultramarathon disaster. On the same day, the opening round at Zhuhai International Circuit was postponed. The revised calendar was communicated to the teams on 30 August. The rounds at Wuhan Street Circuit and Ningbo International Circuit were cancelled while Zhuhai International Circuit was set to host two rounds. The planned opening round was once again postponed one week afterwards and later moved to Ningbo to its original date. The round in Ningbo was once again postponed, this time 3–5 December, making it the season's finale.

Round		Circuit	Date	Pole position	Fastest lap	Winning driver	Winning team	Master class winner	Supporting
1	R1	(China) Zhuhai International Circuit, Zhuhai	23 October	(China) Ryan Liu	(China) Ryan Liu	(Macau) Charles Leong	(China) Theodore Smart Life Racing Team	(Hong Kong) Patrick Tsang	China GT Championship
1	R2	(China) Zhuhai International Circuit, Zhuhai	23 October		(Macau) Charles Leong	(Macau) Charles Leong	(China) Theodore Smart Life Racing Team	(Chinese Taipei) Brian Lee	China GT Championship
1	R3	(China) Zhuhai International Circuit, Zhuhai	24 October	(Macau) Charles Leong	(Macau) Charles Leong	(Macau) Charles Leong	(China) Theodore Smart Life Racing Team	(Chinese Taipei) Brian Lee	China GT Championship
1	R4	(China) Zhuhai International Circuit, Zhuhai	24 October		(Macau) Andy Chang	(Macau) Charles Leong	(China) Theodore Smart Life Racing Team	(Hong Kong) James Wong	China GT Championship
2	R5	Guia Circuit, Macau	20 November	(Macau) Charles Leong	(Macau) Charles Leong	(Macau) Charles Leong	(China) Theodore Smart Life Racing Team	(China) Li Chao	Macau Grand Prix
2	R6	Guia Circuit, Macau	21 November	(Macau) Charles Leong	(China) Oscar Gao	(Macau) Charles Leong	(China) Theodore Smart Life Racing Team	(China) Li Chao	Macau Grand Prix
3	R7	(China) Ningbo International Circuit, Ningbo	4 December	(China) Oscar Gao	(China) Oscar Gao	(China) Oscar Gao	(China) LEO GEEKE Team	(Chinese Taipei) Brian Lee	
3	R8	(China) Ningbo International Circuit, Ningbo	4 December		(China) Xu Shenghui	(Macau) Andy Chang	(China) Chengdu Tianfu International Circuit Team	(Chinese Taipei) Brian Lee	
3	R9	(China) Ningbo International Circuit, Ningbo	5 December	(Macau) Andy Chang	(China) Ryan Liu	(China) Ryan Liu	(China) Smart Life Racing Team	(Chinese Taipei) Brian Lee	
3	R10	(China) Ningbo International Circuit, Ningbo	5 December		(Macau) Andy Chang	(China) Xu Shenghui	(China) GEEKE XL DRIFT	(Hong Kong) James Wong	

== Championship standings ==
Races	Position, points per race									
Races	**1st**	**2nd**	**3rd**	**4th**	**5th**	**6th**	**7th**	**8th**	**9th**	**10th**
4-races Rounds	25	18	15	12	10	8	6	4	2	1
2-races Rounds	50	36	30	24	20	16	12	8	4	2

=== Drivers' Championship ===
Pos	Driver	ZIC				MAC		NIC				Pts
1	(Macau) Andy Chang	2	3	3	2	2	2	3	1	**5**	2	254
2	(China) Li Sicheng	4	2	Ret	Ret	3	3	4	8	3	4	155
3	(China) Ryan Liu	**3**	Ret	2	3			2	3	1	3	134
4	(China) Lü Jingxi	7	7	4	6	8	7	8	7	7	5	105
5	(China) Jing Zefeng					4	4	6	6	10	Ret	77
6	(China) Hu Chengru	8	5	7	Ret	WD	WD	5	4	Ret	6	63
7	(China) Oscar Gao							**1**	2	2	DNS	61
8	(Chinese Taipei) Brian Lee	Ret	6	8	8	12	8	9	9	6	9	58
9	(China) Xu Shenghui							7	5	4	1	53
10	(China) Shang Zhonqyi					5	6					44
11	(China) Li Chao					6	5					44
12	(Hong Kong) James Wong	Ret	8	10	7	11	13	10	10	9	8	42
13	(China) Fang Weiyuan	6	Ret	14	5							27
14	(China) Liu Tiezheng	9	11	6	Ret							20
15	(Hong Kong) Patrick Tsang	10	10	11	9	Ret	Ret					16
16	(Hong Kong) Wong Yuiming	Ret	Ret	13	10	10	Ret					16
17	(China) Wang Zhongwei	Ret	9	9	12							13
18	(China) Ruan Cunfan							11	11	8	7	10
19	(Chinese Taipei) Lishin Peng					Ret	10					8
20	(China) Lü Yiyu	11	12	12	11							6
21	(United States) Michael Farrens							13	13	12	10	1
22	(China) Zheng Hui							12	12	11	Ret	0
Guest drivers ineligible to score points
	(Macau) Charles Leong	1	1	**1**	1	**1**	**1**					–
	(China) Neric Wei	5	4	5	4	DNS	9					–
	(Macau) Mak Ka Lok					7	11					–
	(China) Lin Lifeng					9	14					–
	(Macau) Lei Kit Meng					Ret	12					–
Pos	Driver	ZIC				MAC		NIC				Pts

Colour	Result
Gold	Winner
Silver	Second place
Bronze	Third place
Green	Points classification
Blue	Non-points classification
Blue	Non-classified finish (NC)
Purple	Retired, not classified (Ret)
Red	Did not qualify (DNQ)
Red	Did not pre-qualify (DNPQ)
Black	Disqualified (DSQ)
White	Did not start (DNS)
White	Withdrew (WD)
White	Race cancelled (C)
Blank	Did not practice (DNP)
Blank	Did not arrive (DNA)
Blank	Excluded (EX)

**Bold** – Pole
Italics – Fastest Lap
† — Did not finish, but classified

=== Teams' Cup ===
Pos	Team	Points
1	(China) Chengdu Tianfu International Circuit Team	298
2	(China) GEEKE XL DRIFT	179
3	(China) Smart Life Racing Team	140
4	(China) Blackjack 21 Racing Team	135
5	(China) Theodore Smart Life Racing Team	106
6	(China) iDEAK Racing by KRC	89
7	(China) Champ Motorsport	79
8	(China) Ningbo International Circuit Team	77
9	(China) LEO GEEKE Team	61
10	(China) Pointer Racing	27
11	(China) Henmax Motorsport	16
