= Hon Chio Leong =

Macau racing driver

- Chinese: 梁瀚昭
- Born: 12 September 2001 (age 25); Macau, China
- Other name: Charles Leong

FIA Formula 3 European Championship
- Years active: 2018
- Teams: Hitech Grand Prix
- Starts: 3
- Wins: 0
- Poles: 0
- Fastest laps: 0
- Best finish: 26th in 2018

Previous series
- 2022–2023; 2022; 2020–2022; 2019; 2018; 2018; 2017; 2016–2018; 2016: China GT; China Endurance; F4 Chinese; FIA F3; F3 Asian; F3 European; Asian Formula Renault; F4 Chinese; Formula Masters China

Championship titles
- 2017 2017 2020 2021 2025: Asian Formula Renault; F4 Chinese; Macau Grand Prix; Macau Grand Prix; Lamborghini Super Trofeo Asia

Awards
- 2017: Macau Outstanding Youth Athlete

Chinese name
- Traditional Chinese: 梁瀚昭
- Simplified Chinese: 梁瀚昭
Transcriptions
Standard Mandarin
- Hanyu Pinyin: Liáng Hàn Zhāo
Yue: Cantonese
- Jyutping: Loeng4 Hon6 Ciu1

Hon Chio Leong (Chinese: 梁瀚昭, born 12 September 2001), also known as Charles Leong, is a racing driver from Macau. He is the only local driver to win the Macau Grand Prix twice, albeit in Formula 4 machinery. He currently competes in Lamborghini Super Trofeo Asia, having previously competed in the FIA Formula 3 European Championship.

Leong has participated in his home race six times, winning both the COVID-impacted 2020 edition and 2021 edition for Formula 4 machinery.

Leong prepared for the 2021 Macau Grand Prix by competing as a guest driver in four FIA F4 China Championship races at the Zhuhai International Circuit held from 24 to 25 October. Leong won all four races.

== Career ==
=== Formula 4 ===
Leong tested in a Formula 4 car when he was thirteen. Since then, he has gained a passion for single-seater racing.

=== Formula 4 Chinese Championship ===
==== 2016 ====
In 2016, when Leong was fourteen, he geared up for his first race in Formula 4 by joining the 2016 F4 Chinese Championship with Asia Racing Team. Leong entered 2 rounds of the championship. At Goldenport Park Circuit, Leong took the pole position in race 1. He would finish fourth and fifth in races 1 and 2 respectively, but retired in race 3. In the Shanghai International Circuit round, he would finish third, first, and sixth in races 1, 2, and 3 respectively, and set the fastest lap in race 2. Leong would be illegible to score points as he was under the age of fifteen. Leong is the 15th youngest F4 race winner.

==== Macau Formula 4 Race ====
In the 70th Macau Grand Prix, Leong participated in the first weekend’s Macau Formula 4 Race which was an invitational round of the 2023 Formula 4 South East Asia Championship, with SJM Theodore Prema Racing. It was Leong’s first race in the Tatuus F4-T421. Leong qualified fourth, behind Hadrien David. Wet conditions were encountered during the qualifying race, which Leong was able to finish third due to David’s non-classification. Positive momentum continued in the final race, which Leong finished second, behind his teammate Arvid Lindblad.

=== Lamborghini Super Trofeo Asia ===
In 2024, Leong made his first appearance with Miki Koyama in the Lamborghini Super Trofeo Asia with SJM Iron Lynx Theodore Racing. Leong completed the season as the first runner-up in the Pro class. He returned to the series in 2025 for SJM Theodore Racing, with Alex Denning as his teammate, and claimed the Pro title one round early.

== Karting record ==
=== Karting career summary ===
Season	Series	Team	Position
2011	Asian Karting Open Championship — Mini Rok	Solar Racing Team	26th
2012	Asian Karting Open Championship — Mini Rok	Solar Racing Team	?
2013	Asian Karting Open Championship — Mini Rok	Solar Racing Team	?
2014	AAMC Karting Championship — Junior Rotax Max		?
2014	Asian Karting Open Championship — Formula 125 Open Junior	Solar Racing Team	?
2014	China Karting Championship — Junior		2nd
2014	Sanshui Forest Cup Karting Race — Junior		1st
2015	Asian Karting Open Championship — Formula 125 Open Junior	Smart Life Racing Team	?
2015	China Karting Championship — Senior B		1st
2016	AAMC Karting Championship — KZ		3rd
2016	China Karting Championship — Senior A		1st
2016	Hong Kong Karting Championship — Senior A		1st
2016	CIK-FIA Asia-Pacific Championship — KZ	Advance Racing	10th
2016	Macau Cup	Advance Racing	?
2018	Macau Cup	Solar Racing Team	7th
2019	Macau Cup	Solar Racing Team	10th

== Racing record ==
=== Racing career summary ===
Season	Series	Team	Races	Wins	Poles	F/Laps	Podiums	Points	Position
2016	Formula Masters China	Champ Motorsport	3	0	0	0	0	61	7th
2016	Formula Masters China	DP Motorsport	6	0	0	0	2	61	7th
2016	F4 Chinese Championship	Asia Racing Team	6	1	1	1	2	0	NC†
2017	F4 Chinese Championship	BlackArts Racing Team	17	11	3	9	14	345	**1st**
2017	Asian Formula Renault Series	BlackArts Racing Team	10	4	3	3	9	245	**1st**
2018	FIA Formula 3 European Championship	Hitech Bullfrog GP	3	0	0	0	0	0	26th
2018	Macau Grand Prix	Hitech GP	1	0	0	0	0	—N/a	DNF
2018	F3 Asian Championship	Hitech Grand Prix	15	0	0	0	6	145	4th
2018	Asian Formula Renault Series	Asia Racing Team	4	3	0	1	3	90	6th
2018	F4 Chinese Championship	BlackArts Racing Team	3	2	0	0	2	0	NC†
2019	F3 Asian Championship - Winter Series	BlackArts Racing Team	3	0	0	0	0	20	12th
2019	FIA Formula 3 Championship	Jenzer Motorsport	2	0	0	0	0	0	33rd
2019	Macau Grand Prix	Jenzer Motorsport	1	0	0	0	0	—N/a	19th
2020	F4 Chinese Championship	Smart Life Racing Team	6	5	4	3	5	0	NC†
2020	Macau Grand Prix	Smart Life Racing Team	1	1	1	0	1	N/A	**1st**
2021	F4 Chinese Championship	Theodore Smart Life Racing Team	6	6	3	3	6	0	NC†
2021	Macau Grand Prix	Theodore Smart Life Racing Team	1	1	1	0	1	—N/a	**1st**
2022	F4 Chinese Championship	Theodore Blackjack Racing	2	0	0	0	2	0	NC†
2022	Macau Grand Prix	Theodore Blackjack Racing	1	0	0	0	1	—N/a	**3rd**
2022	China GT Championship - GT3	Harmony Racing	4	2	?	?	3	?	?
2022	China Endurance Championship	Harmony Racing	2	1	?	?	2	43	**3rd**
2023	China GT Championship - GT3	Harmony Racing	2	2	2	?	2	?	?
2023	Macau Formula 4 Race	SJM Theodore Prema Racing	2	0	0	0	2	—N/a	**2nd**
2024	Lamborghini Super Trofeo Asia - Pro	SJM Iron Lynx Theodore Racing	12	0	1	2	10	127	**2nd**
2024	Lamborghini Super Trofeo World Final - Pro	SJM Iron Lynx Theodore Racing	2	0	0	0	0	0	11th
2025	Lamborghini Super Trofeo Asia - Pro	SJM Theodore Racing	12	8	3	4	12	171	**1st**
2025	Lamborghini Super Trofeo World Final - Pro	SJM Theodore Racing	2	0	0	0	0	0	NC
2025	Macau Grand Prix	SJM Theodore Prema Racing	1	0	0	0	0	—N/a	21st

^{†} As Leong was a guest driver, he was ineligible for points.

*Season still in progress.

=== Complete Formula Masters China results ===
(key) (Races in bold indicate pole position) (Races in italics indicate fastest lap)

Year	Entrant	1	2	3	4	5	6	7	8	9	10	11	12	13	14	15	16	17	18	DC	Points
2016	Champ Motorsport	SHI; 1	SHI; 2	SHI; 3	ZHU; 1; 4	ZHU; 2; 5	ZHU; 3; 4	CHA; 1	CHA; 2	CHA; 3										7th	61
2016	DP Motorsport										SEP1; 1; 3	SEP1; 2; 5	SEP1; 3 Ret	SEP2; 1; 8	SEP2; 2; 4	SEP2; 3; 3	PEN; 1	PEN; 2	PEN; 3	7th	61

=== Complete F4 Chinese Championship results ===
(key) (Races in bold indicate pole position; races in italics indicate fastest lap)

Year	Entrant	1	2	3	4	5	6	7	8	9	10	11	12	13	14	15	16	17	18	19	20	21	Pos	Points
2016	Asia Racing Team	ZIC1; 1 DNS	ZIC2; 2 DNS	ZIC3; 3 DNS	CGC; 1	CGC; 2	CGC; 3	**BGP**; **1**; 4	BGP; 2; 5	BGP; 3 Ret	SIC; 1; 3	SIC; 2; 1	SIC; 3; 6	ZIC2; 1	ZIC2; 2	ZIC2; 3							NC†	0
2017	BlackArts Racing Team	**ZIC**; **1**; 1	ZIC; 2; 1	ZIC; 3; 4	CGC; 1 Ret	CGC; 2; 2	CGC; 3; 3	**BGP**; **1**; 1	BGP; 2; 1	BGP; 3; 1	SIC1; 1; 1	SIC1; 2; 1	SIC1; 3 C	**SIC2**; **1**; 1	SIC2; 2; 1	SIC2; 3 Ret	NIC1; 1; 1	NIC1; 2; 1	NIC1; 3; 1	NIC2; 1	NIC2; 2	NIC2; 3	1st	345
2018	BlackArts Racing Team	NIC1; 1	NIC1; 2	NIC1; 3	ZIC; 1	ZIC; 2	ZIC; 3	CGC; 1	CGC; 2	CGC; 3	NIC2; 1	NIC2; 2	NIC2; 3	SIC; 1	SIC; 2	SIC; 3	WUH; 1; 1	WUH; 2; 1	WUH; 3; 4	NIC3; 1	NIC3; 2	NIC3; 3	NC†	0
2020	Smart Life Racing Team	ZIC1; 1	ZIC1; 2	ZIC1; 3	ZIC1; 4	**ZIC2**; **1**; 1	ZIC2; 2; 1	**ZIC2**; **3**; 1	ZIC2; 4 Ret	**MAC**; **1**; 1	**MAC**; **2**; 1												NC†	0
2021	Theodore Smart Life Racing Team	ZIC; 1; 1	ZIC; 2; 1	**ZIC**; **3**; 1	ZIC; 4; 1	**MAC**; **1**; 1	**MAC**; **2**; 1	NIC; 1	NIC; 2	NIC; 3	NIC; 4												NC†	0
2022	Theodore Blackjack Racing	NIC1; 1	NIC1; 2	NIC1; 3	NIC1; 4	NIC2; 1	NIC2; 2	NIC2; 3	NIC2; 4	MAC; 1; 2	MAC; 2; 3	PIC; 1	PIC; 2	PIC; 3	PIC; 4								NC†	0

=== Complete F3 Asian Championship results ===
(key) (Races in bold indicate pole position) (Races in italics indicate fastest lap)

Year	Entrant	1	2	3	4	5	6	7	8	9	10	11	12	13	14	15	Pos	Points
2018	Dragon HitechGP	SEP1; 1; 2	SEP1; 2; 3	SEP1; 3; 12	NIS1; 1; 6	NIS1; 2; 5	NIS1; 3; 6	SIC; 1; 4	SIC; 2; 3	SIC; 3; 4	NIS2; 1; 3	NIS2; 2; 3	NIS2; 3; 3	SEP2; 1; 13	SEP2; 2; 15†	SEP2; 3; 9	4th	145

=== Complete FIA Formula 3 European Championship results ===
(key) (Races in bold indicate pole position) (Races in italics indicate fastest lap)

Year	Entrant	Engine	1	2	3	4	5	6	7	8	9	10	11	12	13	14	15	16	17	18	19	20	21	22	23	24	25	26	27	28	29	30	DC	Points
2018	Hitech Bullfrog GP	Mercedes	PAU; 1	PAU; 2	PAU; 3	HUN; 1	HUN; 2	HUN; 3	NOR; 1	NOR; 2	NOR; 3	ZAN; 1	ZAN; 2	ZAN; 3	SPA; 1	SPA; 2	SPA; 3	SIL; 1; 19	SIL; 2; 22	SIL; 3; 20	MIS; 1	MIS; 2	MIS; 3	NÜR; 1	NÜR; 2	NÜR; 3	RBR; 1	RBR; 2	RBR; 3	HOC; 1	HOC; 2	HOC; 3	26th	0

=== Complete Macau Grand Prix results ===
Year	Team	Car	Qualifying	Quali Race	Main race
2018	(United Kingdom) Hitech GP	Dallara F317	22nd	18th	DNF
2019	(Switzerland) Jenzer Motorsport	Dallara F3 2019	28th	13th	19th
2020	(China) Smart Life Racing Team	Mygale M14-F4	**1st**	**1st**	**1st**
2021	(China) Smart Life Racing Team	Mygale M14-F4	**1st**	**1st**	**1st**
2022	(China) Theodore Blackjack Racing	Mygale M14-F4	**3rd**	**2nd**	**3rd**
2025	(Hong Kong) SJM Theodore Prema Racing	Tatuus F3 T-318	23rd	23rd	21st

==== Macau Formula 4 Race ====
Year	Team	Car	Qualifying	Quali Race	Main race
2023	(Hong Kong) SJM Theodore Prema Racing	Tatuus F4-T421	4th	**3rd**	**2nd**

=== Complete F3 Asian Winter Series results ===
(key) (Races in bold indicate pole position) (Races in italics indicate fastest lap)

Year	Team	1	2	3	4	5	6	7	8	9	Pos	Points
2019	BlackArts Racing Team	CHA; 1	CHA; 2	CHA; 3	SEP1; 1	SEP1; 2	SEP1; 3	SEP2; 1; 9	SEP2; 2; 12	SEP2; 3; 8	12th	20

=== Complete FIA Formula 3 Championship results ===
(key) (Races in bold indicate pole position; races in italics indicate points for the fastest lap of top ten finishers)

Year	Entrant	1	2	3	4	5	6	7	8	9	10	11	12	13	14	15	16	DC	Points
2019	Jenzer Motorsport	CAT; FEA	CAT; SPR	LEC; FEA	LEC; SPR	RBR; FEA	RBR; SPR	SIL; FEA	SIL; SPR	HUN; FEA	HUN; SPR	SPA; FEA	SPA; SPR	MNZ; FEA	MNZ; SPR	SOC; FEA; Ret	SOC; SPR; 21	33rd	0

=== Complete Formula 4 South East Asia Championship results ===
(key) (Races in bold indicate pole position; races in italics indicate fastest lap)

Year	Entrant	1	2	3	4	5	6	7	8	9	10	11	Pos	Points
2023	SJM Theodore Prema Racing	ZZIC1; 1	ZZIC1; 2	ZZIC1; 3	MAC; 1; 3	MAC; 2; 2	SEP1; 1	SEP1; 2	SEP1; 3	SEP2; 1	SEP2; 2	SEP2; 3	NC†	0

Sporting positions
Preceded by Josh Burdon	Asian Formula Renault Series; Champion; 2017	Succeeded by Daniel Cao
Preceded by Bruno Carneiro	F4 Chinese Championship; Champion; 2017	Succeeded by Jordan Dempsey
Preceded by Richard Verschoor	Macau Grand Prix; Winner; 2020-2021	Succeeded by Wing Chung Chang
Preceded by Emilien Carde; Dan Wells	Lamborghini Super Trofeo Asia; Pro Champion; 2025; With: Alex Denning	Succeeded by Incumbent
