= 2024 FIA GT World Cup =

Sports car race

Race details
Date	17 November 2024
Official name	Macau GT Cup – FIA GT World Cup
Location	Guia Circuit, Macau
Course	Temporary street circuit 6.120 km (3.803 mi)
Distance	Qualification Race; 12 laps, 73.440 km (45.634 mi); Main Race; 16 laps, 97.920 km (60.845 mi)
- Qualification Race

Pole
Driver	Raffaele Marciello (CHE)	TORO Racing powered by MCG
Time	2:16.509

Fastest lap
Driver	Sheldon van der Linde (ZAF)	Team WRT
Time	2:16.710

Podium
First	Raffaele Marciello (CHE)	TORO Racing powered by MCG
Second	Dries Vanthoor (BEL)	Team WRT
Third	Antonio Fuoco (ITA)	AF Corse SRL
- Main Race

Fastest lap
Driver	Maro Engel (DEU)	Mercedes-AMG Team GruppeM Racing
Time	2:32.696

Podium
First	Maro Engel (DEU)	Mercedes-AMG Team GruppeM Racing
Second	Augusto Farfus (BRA)	Team KRC
Third	Sheldon van der Linde (ZAF)	Team WRT

The 2024 FIA GT World Cup (formally the Macau GT Cup – FIA GT World Cup) was a Grand Touring (GT) sports car race held on the Guia Circuit in Macau on 17 November 2024. It was the seventh FIA GT World Cup and the fourteenth GT3 car race held in Macau. The race was co-organised by the SRO Motorsports Group and was sanctioned by the Fédération Internationale de l'Automobile. The edition included two races, with a 12-lap qualifying race setting the 16-lap main race's starting order.

Maro Engel of Team GruppeM Racing won the main race after finishing fourth in the previous afternoon's qualification race, won by TORO Racing driver Raffaele Marciello. Engel led the final two laps of the main race after Marciello crashed with AF Corse SRL driver Antonio Fuoco at Lisboa turn while vying for victory on lap 15. Augusto Farfus of Team KRC finished second, while his BMW brandmate Sheldon van der Linde finished third for Team WRT.

== Background and entry list ==
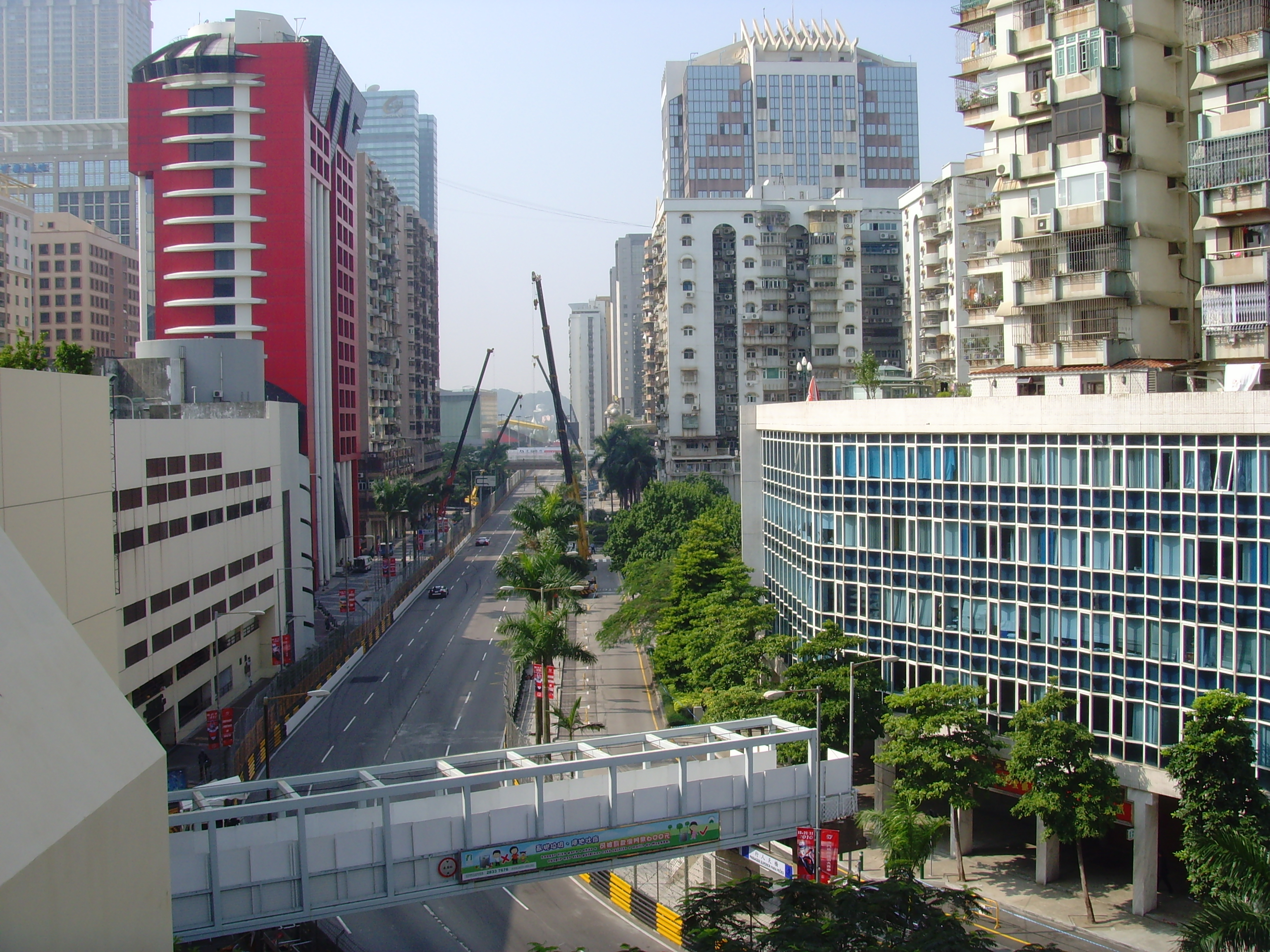
The Guia Circuit, where the race was held.

On 28 February 2024, the FIA World Motor Sport Council met in Geneva and confirmed the 2024 FIA GT World Cup. The Fédération Internationale de l'Automobile (FIA) sanctioned the event, its seventh edition, the fourteenth race in Macau for GT3-specification cars since 2008 and an undercard to the 2024 Macau Grand Prix. It was held at the 22-turn 6.120 km (3.803 mi) Guia Circuit in the streets of the Chinese special administrative region of Macau. The main race took place on 17 November after three days of practice and qualifying. The event was co-organised by the SRO Motorsports Group. Pirelli was the event's control tyre supplier. The race saw the use of renewable fuels for the first time, after a transitional experiment at the previous year's event where a blend of sustainable fuel and traditional petrol was used. All cars used a wholly sustainable fuel made from second-generation bio components sourced from bio waste.

To enter the event, drivers must have competed in an FIA-recognised GT3 championship race within the previous two seasons or have extensive expertise in Grand Touring (GT) cars. Platinum, Gold, Silver and Bronze-rated drivers were allowed to compete, however the FIA GT World Cup Committee may deny a competitor's entrance if they are deemed inexperienced. According to the race regulations, entry was limited to 23 cars and open through a registration portal from 17 June until 29 July 2024. The FIA and the Macau Grand Prix Organizing Committee revealed the entry list on 25 October, which included six GT3 manufacturers (Audi, BMW, Ferrari, Lamborghini, Mercedes-AMG and Porsche), (Note: British GT3 manufacturers Aston Martin and McLaren did not participate, mainly because of their limited presence in the Asian market. Neither Chevrolet nor Ford entered the event.) an increase from four from the previous year. There were 23 drivers entered, 15 of whom were platinum-graded and five of whom were gold rated, and all five preceding FIA GT World Cup winners, Maro Engel, Augusto Farfus, Raffaele Marciello, Edoardo Mortara and Laurens Vanthoor, partook in the event.

== Practice and qualifying ==
A pair of half-an-hour practice sessions were held on 14 November, one in the morning and the other in the afternoon. The first session began on a wet track but quickly dried, allowing for quicker lap times until the rain returned near the session's end. Mortara set the session's fastest lap of 2:33.309, 0.824 seconds faster than second-placed Laurin Heinrich. Daniel Juncadella, Engel, Yifei Ye, Daniel Serra, Laurens Vanthoor, Luca Engstler, Farfus and Sheldon van der Linde were in positions three to ten. Alessio Picariello caused the first red flag period by spinning at the Melco hairpin exit and blocking the circuit. Serra spun in the same corner and practice was stopped for a second time to enable the recovery of his Ferrari. Laurens Vanthoor's car was undamaged despite running wide at the hairpin with 16 minutes left. The track was damp but drying quickly for the second session until light rain fell towards the end. On his first push lap, Picariello lapped fastest with a time of 2:21.329. He was 0.304 seconds faster than teammate Laurens Vanthoor in second. Serra, Marciello, Farfus, Heinrich, Engel, Juncadella, Thomas Preining and Mortara followed in the top ten. Some drivers hit the barriers during the session. Engstler lost control of his car at the right-hand turn past Faraway corner and damaged the front of his car against the barriers around seven minutes in. When Van Der Linde hit the wall with his left side at the fast Mandarin Bend corner, practice was halted. It took a crane to retrieve his car. His team fixed the car and found no evidence of chassis damage. Adderly Fong spun into the barriers going over a crest at the San Francisco Hill corner and damaged the front of his car. He managed to return to the pit lane, so the session continued.

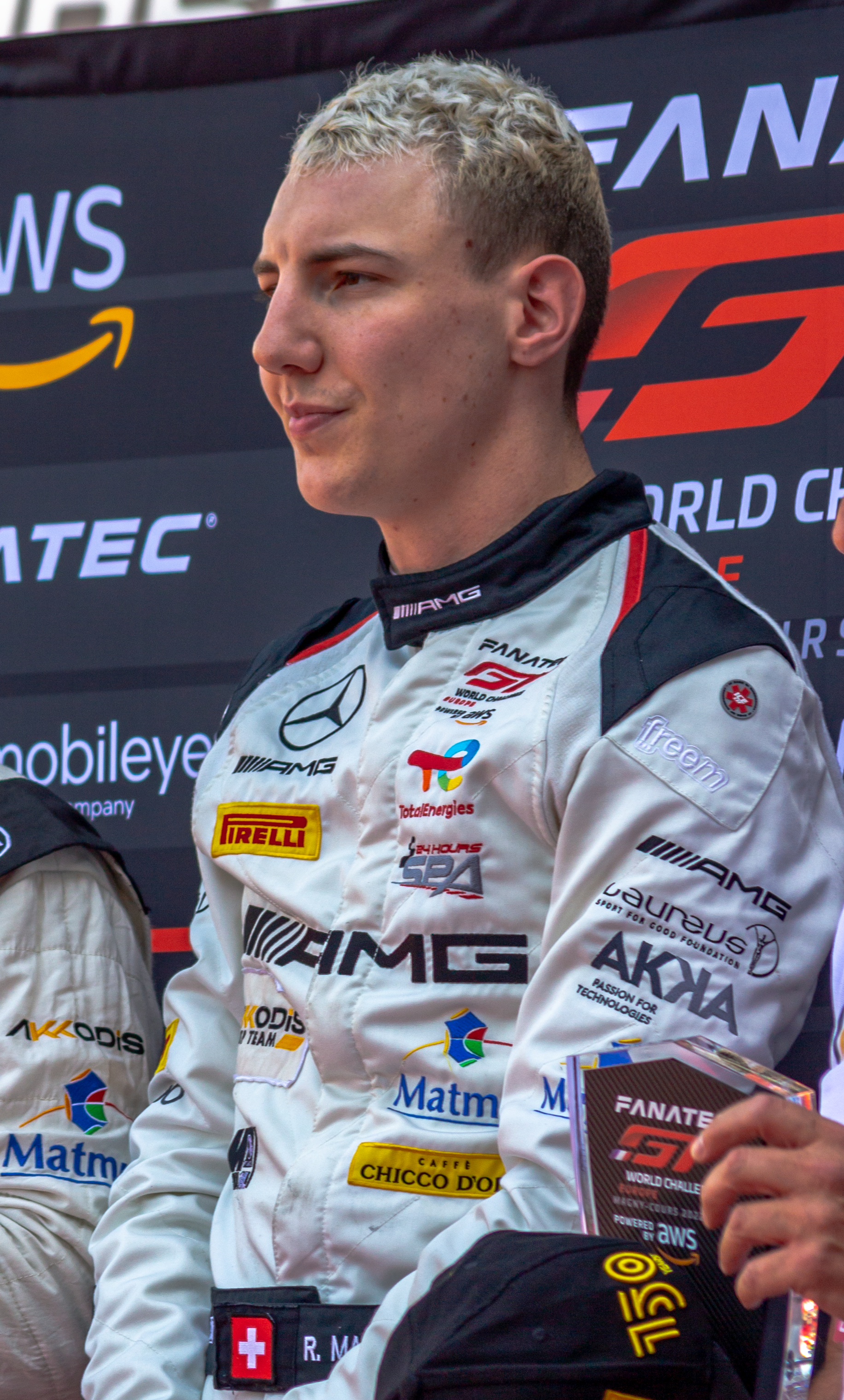
Raffaele Marciello (pictured in 2022) took his fourth successive pole position in the FIA GT World Cup with the fastest lap time in the qualifying session.

Friday afternoon's half-hour qualifying session determined the qualification race's starting order with each driver's fastest lap times. After that morning's rain, the circuit had dried up, and for the first time, drivers could push hard in dry weather. Most teams chose to make two qualifying attempts so they could change onto new slick tyres between their flying laps. Marciello secured his fourth consecutive FIA GT World Cup pole position with a lap time of 2:16.509 on a new set of tyres. Dries Vanthoor took the front row for BMW after qualifying 0.053 seconds behind Marciello in second place, despite being fastest after the first round of fast laps. Engel was briefly fastest early in the session but ultimately fell to third, and was improving on his second attempt but had to abandon the lap due to a red flag. In his first Macau race since the 2014 Macau Grand Prix, race rookie Antonio Fuoco took fourth fastest among Ferrari drivers, ahead of Farfus in fifth. Van Der Linde qualified sixth with his rebuilt car. Laurens Vanthoor was the best-placed Porsche entrant in seventh. Picairello was eighth, Ricardo Feller took ninth and Christopher Haase came tenth. After a stoppage prevented Mortara from improving his lap on a new set of tyres, he qualified 11th. Ye was 12th, followed by Juncadella and Preining. Ralf Aron, 15th, crashed into the tyre barrier at Police corner but was able to continue driving. He was ahead of Serra in 16th. 17th-placed Heinrich lost control of his car at the start of qualifying and damaged its front-left against the wall at the right-hand Lisboa turn. Race officials halted qualifying, but Heinrich managed to go return to pit lane. He was able to resume qualifying after his car was repaired. Matteo Cairoli took 18th after a puncture in the closing ten minutes. Fong qualified his rebuilt car 19th. Engstler ran wide at the exit of Mandarin Bend corner because he had not driven on a dry track, lost control of the car's rear, and crashed into the outside barriers, severely damaging it. Engstler was rendered unconscious and taken to the hospital for a preventative examination. Race officials decided to end qualifying early with four minutes left because the circuit was covered in debris. The Chinese duo of James Yu Kuai and Leo Ye Hongli took 21st and 22nd. Jules Gounon failed to set a lap time after severely damaging his car's left-front corner at the uphill Police corner but returned to the pit lane. This meant Gounon began the qualifying race from the back of the grid.

=== Post-qualifying ===
The FIA altered the balance of performance to try and create parity within the field. For the rest of the event, the BMW M4 GT3's performance was lowered by 40 millibars by lowering the turbocharger boost at all power levels. All other GT3 cars had no performance changes.

=== Qualifying classification ===
Final qualifying classification
Pos.	Class	No.	Driver	Team	Manufacturer	Time	Gap
1	P	1	Raffaele Marciello (CHE)	TORO Racing powered by MCG	BMW	2:16.509	–
2	P	32	Dries Vanthoor (BEL)	Team WRT	BMW	2:16.562	+0.053
3	P	130	Maro Engel (DEU)	Mercedes-AMG Team GruppeM Racing	Mercedes-Benz	2:16.764	+0.255
4	P	83	Antonio Fuoco (ITA)	AF Corse SRL	Ferrari	2:16.788	+0.279
5	P	89	Augusto Farfus (BRA)	Team KRC	BMW	2:16.814	+0.305
6	P	31	Sheldon van der Linde (ZAF)	Team WRT	BMW	2:16.853	+0.344
7	P	25	Laurens Vanthoor (BEL)	Absolute Racing	Porsche	2:17.243	+0.734
8	G	911	Alessio Picariello (BEL)	Absolute Racing	Porsche	2:17.853	+1.344
9	P	36	Ricardo Feller (CHE)	FAW Audi Sport Asia Racing Team	Audi	2:17.854	+1.345
10	P	33	Christopher Haase (DEU)	Phantom Global Racing	Audi	2:18.169	+1.660
11	P	63	Edoardo Mortara (ITA)	SJM VSR Theodore Racing	Lamborghini	2:18.241	+1.732
12	G	50	Ye Yifei (CHN)	Harmony Racing	Ferrari	2:18.321	+1.812
13	P	77	Daniel Juncadella (ESP)	Mercedes-AMG Team Craft-Bamboo Racing	Mercedes-Benz	2:18.371	+1.862
14	P	4	Thomas Preining (AUT)	Origine Motorsport	Porsche	2:18.573	+2.064
15	G	7	Ralf Aron (EST)	TORO Racing	Mercedes-Benz	2:18.597	+2.088
16	P	51	Daniel Serra (BRA)	Harmony Racing	Ferrari	2:18.602	+2.093
17	G	88	Laurin Heinrich (DEU)	Schumacher CLRT	Porsche	2:18.688	+2.179
18	P	19	Matteo Cairoli (ITA)	SJM VSR Theodore Racing	Lamborghini	2:18.787	+2.278
19	S	10	Adderly Fong (HKG)	Uno Racing Team	Audi	2:20.376	+3.867
20	G	8	Luca Engstler (DEU)	Liqui Moly Team Engstler	Lamborghini	2:20.494	+3.985
21	S	30	James Yu Kuai (CHN)	Uno Racing Team	Audi	2:22.245	+5.736
22	S	566	Leo Ye Hongli (CHN)	Origine Motorsport	Porsche	2:31.618	+15.109
23	P	99	Jules Gounon (AND)	Mercedes-AMG Team Craft-Bamboo Racing	Mercedes-Benz	No time	–

Categorisation
Icon	Class
P	Platinum
G	Gold
S	Silver

== Qualification race ==
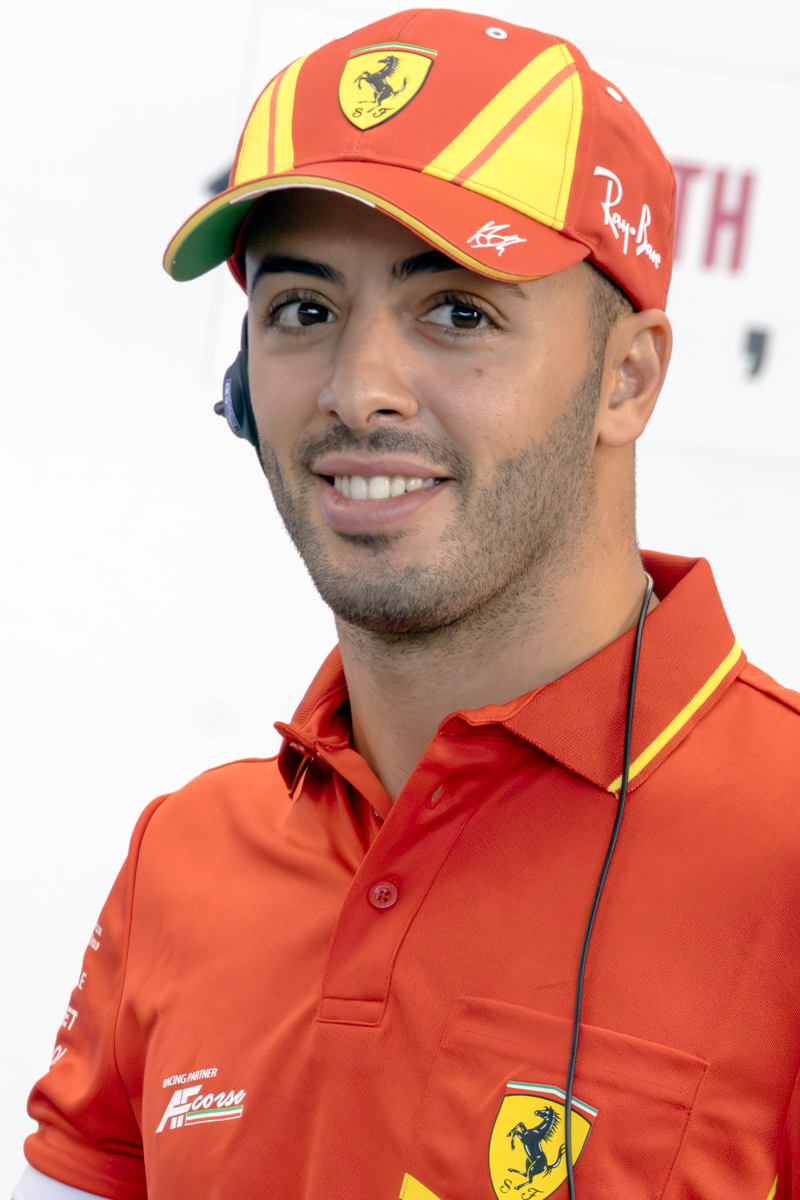
Antonio Fuoco finished the qualification race in third place.

The 12-lap qualifying race to set the main race's starting order was held on 16 November, in sunny weather conditions and an air temperature of 26 °C (79 °F) from 13:50 Macau Standard Time (UTC+08:00). 23 cars were scheduled to start, but Engstler was withdrawn from the event due to significant damage to his vehicle during qualifying. When the lights went out to begin the qualification race from a rolling start, Marciello made a clean start from pole position until he made a minor error through the first corner. Dries Vanthoor thus could pass Marciello for the lead on the outside heading into the Mandarin Oriental Bend turn. However, Vanthoor ran too late for the turn and ran too deep into the right-hand Lisboa corner, which allowed Marciello to retake the lead on the inside. Behind them, Fuoco took third from Engel after putting his car on the outside at turn one, allowing him to pass Engel at Mandarin Oriental Bend corner. It transpired to be the only overtake in the leading group of drivers during the qualifying race and no driver gained one place from their starting position. Laurens Vanthoor sent Haase into the trackside barrier into turn one when the race began and Farfus battled Van Der Linde for fifth. Feller lost two places on the first lap and Mortara moved into tenth.

The first two drivers pulled away from the rest of the field as Fuoco spent most of the race battling Engel for third position until Engel focused on the approaching BMW duo of Farfus and Van Der Linde. The gap between Marciello and Dries Vanthoor fluctuated for the rest of the race, but for much of it, it was more than a second. Dries Vanthoor pushed hard to gain on Marciello in the final laps, setting a series of fastest laps, but Marciello maintained the race lead to win the qualification race and secure pole position for the main race. Dries Vanthoor finished second, 0.666 seconds behind, and Fuoco completed the podium finishers in third. Engel finished in fourth. The BMW duo of Farfus and Van Der Linde (who set the race's fastest lap on the final lap) were in the starting positions of fifth and sixth. Picariello was the highest-finishing Porsche driver in seventh, ahead of his fellow Belgian and teammate Laurens Vanthoor in eighth. Haase was the best of the Audi drivers in ninth and Mortara took tenth. Feller in 11th put heavy pressure onto Mortara throughout the race with both drivers close together but was unable to pass him. Juncadella, Ye Yifei, Aron, Preining, Serra, Heinrich, Cairoli, Fong, Ye Hongli, Yu and Gounon were the final finishers. There were no major incidents during the race, and all 22 starters finished.

=== Qualification race classification ===
Final qualification race classification
Pos.	Class	No.	Driver	Team	Car	Laps	Time/Retired
1	P	1	Raffaele Marciello (CHE)	TORO Racing powered by MCG	BMW M4 GT3	12	27:37.981
2	P	32	Dries Vanthoor (BEL)	Team WRT	BMW M4 GT3	12	+0.666
3	P	83	Antonio Fuoco (ITA)	AF Corse SRL	Ferrari 296 GT3	12	+1.846
4	P	130	Maro Engel (DEU)	Mercedes-AMG Team GruppeM Racing	Mercedes-AMG GT3 Evo	12	+4.505
5	P	89	Augusto Farfus (BRA)	Team KRC	BMW M4 GT3	12	+6.388
6	P	31	Sheldon van der Linde (ZAF)	Team WRT	BMW M4 GT3	12	+6.761
7	G	911	Alessio Picariello (BEL)	Absolute Racing	Porsche 911 GT3 R (992)	12	+10.242
8	P	25	Laurens Vanthoor (BEL)	Absolute Racing	Porsche 911 GT3 R (992)	12	+12.107
9	P	33	Christopher Haase (DEU)	Phantom Global Racing	Audi R8 LMS Evo II	12	+14.453
10	P	63	Edoardo Mortara (ITA)	SJM VSR Theodore Racing	Lamborghini Huracán GT3 Evo 2	12	+18.258
11	P	36	Ricardo Feller (CHE)	FAW Audi Sport Asia Racing Team	Audi R8 LMS Evo II	12	+18.653
12	P	77	Daniel Juncadella (ESP)	Mercedes-AMG Team Craft-Bamboo Racing	Mercedes-AMG GT3 Evo	12	+26.111
13	G	50	Ye Yifei (CHN)	Harmony Racing	Ferrari 296 GT3	12	+26.372
14	G	7	Ralf Aron (EST)	TORO Racing	Mercedes-AMG GT3 Evo	12	+31.961
15	P	4	Thomas Preining (AUT)	Origine Motorsport	Porsche 911 GT3 R (992)	12	+33.932
16	P	51	Daniel Serra (BRA)	Harmony Racing	Ferrari 296 GT3	12	+34.436
17	G	88	Laurin Heinrich (DEU)	Schumacher CLRT	Porsche 911 GT3 R (992)	12	+35.168
18	P	19	Matteo Cairoli (ITA)	SJM VSR Theodore Racing	Lamborghini Huracán GT3 Evo 2	12	+36.619
19	S	10	Adderly Fong (HKG)	Uno Racing Team	Audi R8 LMS Evo II	12	+38.839
20	S	566	Leo Ye Hongli (CHN)	Origine Motorsport	Porsche 911 GT3 R (992)	12	+39.395
21	S	30	James Yu Kuai (CHN)	Uno Racing Team	Audi R8 LMS Evo II	12	+47.334
22	P	99	Jules Gounon (AND)	Mercedes-AMG Team Craft-Bamboo Racing	Mercedes-AMG GT3 Evo	12	+55.327
DNS	G	8	Luca Engstler (DEU)	Liqui Moly Team Engstler	Lamborghini Huracán GT3 Evo 2	0	Accident (Note: Luca Engstler did not start the qualification race due to heavy damage sustained to his car in an accident during the qualifying session.)

== Main race ==
The 16-lap main race was scheduled to commence at 12:25 local time, in wet and humid weather conditions of between 22 and 26 °C (72 and 79 °F) on 17 November, but heavy rain in Macau forced the FIA to move forward the start by 15 minutes because it was concerned about more rain. The race started behind the safety car due to poor visibility and a track surface covered with standing water. After acclimatisation to the track conditions, drivers were allowed to race one another starting from lap six when the safety car was removed at the end of lap five. Marciello maintained the race lead from Dries Vanthoor, Fuoco and Engel, with drivers making attempts at effecting an overtake in multiple sections of the circuit. On lap seven, Cairoli pulled off into the run-off area at Lisboa corner to retire with a suspected problem. The following lap saw Fuoco challenge Dries Vanthoor for second, and found an opening to overtake him on the inside of the Reservoir Bend corner when the lap ended. As Fuoco began to gain on race leader Marciello, Dries Vanthoor came under pressure from Engel in third.

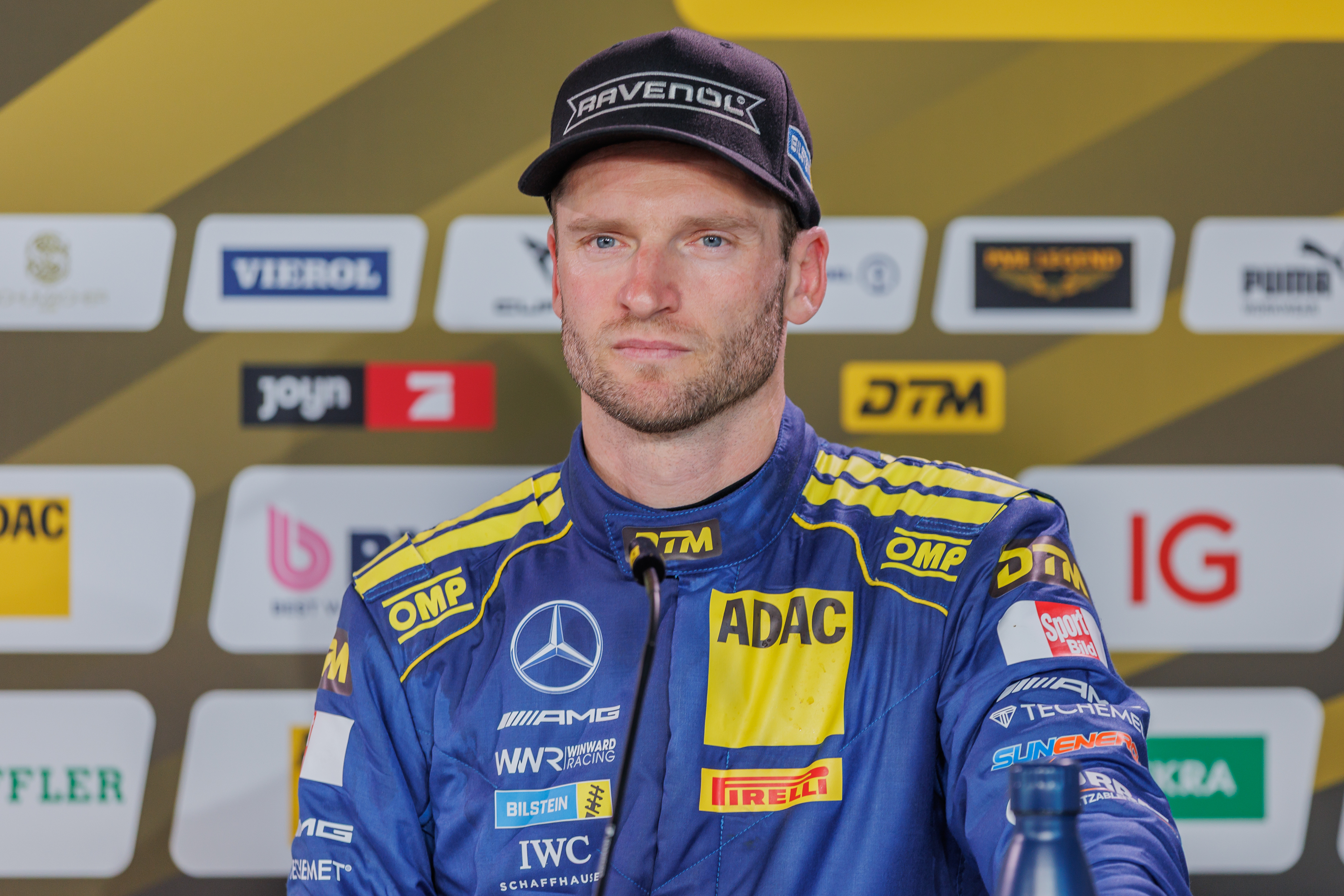
Maro Engel (pictured in 2025) took advantage of a collision between Fuoco and Marciello on lap 15 of the main race to win the FIA GT World Cup for the second time.

On lap nine, as the BMW continued to be faster on the straights, Engel made minor contact with the rear of Dries Vanthoor's car, sending him into the guardrail barrier at Faraway Hill turn in the circuit's mountain section. As a result of the collision breaking his right-rear toe link, Dries Vanthoor retired in the pit lane. moving Engel to third. Without any pressure, Fuoco decreased Marciello's 1.6-second lead to nothing in just one lap. Marciello's BMW was faster on the straights, but Fuoco's Ferrari was quicker than him throughout the lap save for the fast Mandarin Oriental Bend curve and the straight. Soon after, Engel gained on the first two drivers and entered the battle for the win. As a result, the first three runners pursued each other closely for the next six laps, but none of them managed to make a pass. At the end of lap 14, Fuoco passed Marciello on the inside for the lead at Reservoir Bend turn in a near identical manoevure of his overtake on Dries Vanthoor.

Marciello attempted to immediately retaliate and nearly drew alongside Fuoco on the start/finish straight. He accelerated through the Mandarin Oriental Bend faster and closed in on Fuoco on the drive into Lisboa corner. Fuoco defended the lead by going to the inside, and Marciello touched the back of Fuoco's Ferrari before the turn into the corner; both drivers were trying to brake as late as possible for Lisboa turn. Engel took the lead after this contact sent Fuoco and Marciello down the escape road. Fuoco dropped to ninth while Marciello made further contact with the barrier at Teddy Yip corner and retired in the pit lane. Race officials penalised Engel five seconds on the last lap for his earlier accident with Dries Vanthoor, but he pushed hard without aerodynamic turbulence from other cars hindering him; this allowed him to keep the lead and negate the penalty. He won the race ahead of Farfus by 6.641 seconds, winning his second FIA GT World Cup, Mercedes-Benz's third in succession and his fourth GT victory at Macau. Van Der Linde was almost four seconds behind Farfus and completed the podium finishers in third, ahead of a close group comprising Picariello, Laurens Vanthoor, Haase, Mortara, Feller, Fuoco and Juncadella. Ye Yifei, Aron, Heinrich, Serra, Preining, Ye Hongli, Fong, Marciello, Gounon and Yu were the final classified finishers.

=== Main race classification ===
Final classification of the main race
Pos.	Class	No.	Driver	Team	Car	Laps	Time/Retired
1	P	130	Maro Engel (DEU)	Mercedes-AMG Team GruppeM Racing	Mercedes-AMG GT3 Evo	16	45:44.519
2	P	89	Augusto Farfus (BRA)	Team KRC	BMW M4 GT3	16	+6.641
3	P	31	Sheldon van der Linde (ZAF)	Team WRT	BMW M4 GT3	16	+10.299
4	G	911	Alessio Picariello (BEL)	Absolute Racing	Porsche 911 GT3 R (992)	16	+10.881
5	P	25	Laurens Vanthoor (BEL)	Absolute Racing	Porsche 911 GT3 R (992)	16	+11.205
6	P	33	Christopher Haase (DEU)	Phantom Global Racing	Audi R8 LMS Evo II	16	+12.469
7	P	63	Edoardo Mortara (ITA)	SJM VSR Theodore Racing	Lamborghini Huracán GT3 Evo 2	16	+13.025
8	P	36	Ricardo Feller (CHE)	FAW Audi Sport Asia Racing Team	Audi R8 LMS Evo II	16	+13.821
9	P	83	Antonio Fuoco (ITA)	AF Corse SRL	Ferrari 296 GT3	16	+14.853
10	P	77	Daniel Juncadella (ESP)	Mercedes-AMG Team Craft-Bamboo Racing	Mercedes-AMG GT3 Evo	16	+15.937
11	G	50	Ye Yifei (CHN)	Harmony Racing	Ferrari 296 GT3	16	+19.075
12	G	7	Ralf Aron (EST)	TORO Racing	Mercedes-AMG GT3 Evo	16	+19.739
13	G	88	Laurin Heinrich (DEU)	Schumacher CLRT	Porsche 911 GT3 R (992)	16	+19.938
14	P	51	Daniel Serra (BRA)	Harmony Racing	Ferrari 296 GT3	16	+21.198
15	P	4	Thomas Preining (AUT)	Origine Motorsport	Porsche 911 GT3 R (992)	16	+22.169
16	S	566	Leo Ye Hongli (CHN)	Origine Motorsport	Porsche 911 GT3 R (992)	16	+32.839
17	S	10	Adderly Fong (HKG)	Uno Racing Team	Audi R8 LMS Evo II	16	+47.050
18	P	1	Raffaele Marciello (CHE)	TORO Racing powered by MCG	BMW M4 GT3	15	+1 Lap
19	P	99	Jules Gounon (AND)	Mercedes-AMG Team Craft-Bamboo Racing	Mercedes-AMG GT3 Evo	15	+1 Lap
20	S	30	James Yu Kuai (CHN)	Uno Racing Team	Audi R8 LMS Evo II	15	+1 Lap
Ret	P	32	Dries Vanthoor (BEL)	Team WRT	BMW M4 GT3	9	Accident
Ret	P	19	Matteo Cairoli (ITA)	SJM VSR Theodore Racing	Lamborghini Huracán GT3 Evo 2	6	Retired

== See also ==
- 2024 Macau Grand Prix
- 2024 Macau Guia Race
