= 2015–16 F4 Chinese Championship =

The 2015–16 F4 Chinese Championship season (Castrol Cup FIA F4 CHINESE CHAMPIONSHIP) was the inaugural season of the F4 Chinese Championship. It began on 5 July 2015 at the Goldenport Park Circuit in Beijing and finished on 10 January 2016 at the Zhuhai International Circuit after five double header rounds.

== Teams and drivers ==
Team	No.	Drivers	Rounds
(China) Champ Motorsport	3	(China) Chen Zhuoxuan	3–4
(China) Champ Motorsport	8	(China) Liu Wenlong	All
(China) Champ Motorsport	17	(China) Alex Yang	2
(China) Champ Motorsport	18	(China) Xie Ruilin	All
(China) Champ Motorsport	91	(Colombia) Julio Acosta	1–4
(China) Auto Business Racing Team	6	(China) He Weihang	1–2
(China) Wu Pei	7	(China) Wu Pei	1
(China) Zhang Chong	11	(China) Zhang Chong	1
(Macau) Asia Racing Team	16	(China) Hua Miao	1
(Macau) Asia Racing Team	19	(China) Lin Taian	5
(Macau) Asia Racing Team	21	(China) Liu Kai	All
(United States) UMC Utah Motorsports Campus	20	(Brazil) Bruno Carneiro	4
(China) Xiongfeng Racing Team	25	(China) Tai Yi	All
(China) Xiongfeng Racing Team	88	(China) Wu Ruopeng	All
(China) Geely Automobile Racing Team	23	(China) Shang Zongyi	5
(China) Geely Automobile Racing Team	44	(China) Cui Yue	All
(China) Geely Automobile Racing Team	77	(China) Yang Peng	1–3
(China) Boom VROOM Racing Team	66	(China) Qin Tianqi	2

== Race calendar and results ==
- A six–round provisional calendar was revealed on 28 February 2015. In April, the scheduled season-opening round – that was due to be held at Zhuhai – was cancelled, with the season being shortened to five rounds. The then scheduled first round at Chengdu in June was also cancelled, and a new round at Zhuhai was added to be the season-ending round in January 2016. All rounds will be held in China.

Round		Circuit	Date	Pole position	Fastest lap	Winning driver	Winning team
2015
1	R1	Goldenport Park Circuit, Beijing	5 July	(China) Cui Yue	(China) Liu Kai	(Colombia) Julio Acosta	(China) Champ Motorsport
1	R2	Goldenport Park Circuit, Beijing	5 July		(Colombia) Julio Acosta	(Colombia) Julio Acosta	(China) Champ Motorsport
2	R1	Goldenport Park Circuit, Beijing	2 August	(China) Liu Kai	(Colombia) Julio Acosta	(Colombia) Julio Acosta	(China) Champ Motorsport
2	R2	Goldenport Park Circuit, Beijing	2 August		(Colombia) Julio Acosta	(Colombia) Julio Acosta	(China) Champ Motorsport
3	R1	Shanghai International Circuit, Shanghai	20 September	(Colombia) Julio Acosta	(China) Wu Ruopeng	(China) Cui Yue	(China) Geely Automobile Racing Team
3	R2	Shanghai International Circuit, Shanghai	20 September		(Colombia) Julio Acosta	(Colombia) Julio Acosta	(China) Champ Motorsport
4	R1	Zhuhai International Circuit, Zhuhai	1 November	(Colombia) Julio Acosta	(Colombia) Julio Acosta (Note: Liu Kai had originally scored the fastest lap of the race, but prior to the last round at Zhuhai it was announced that both Liu Kai and Yui Cue had been disqualified from this race. As a result, Julio Acosta inherited the fastest lap and was awarded the point for it.)	(Colombia) Julio Acosta	(China) Champ Motorsport
4	R2	Zhuhai International Circuit, Zhuhai	1 November		(Brazil) Bruno Carneiro	(Colombia) Julio Acosta	(China) Champ Motorsport
2016
5	R1	Zhuhai International Circuit, Zhuhai	9 January	(China) Liu Wenlong	(China) Liu Kai	(China) Wu Ruopeng	(China) Xiongfeng Racing Team
5	R2	Zhuhai International Circuit, Zhuhai	10 January		(China) Liu Kai	(China) Liu Kai	(Macau) Asia Racing Team

== Championship standings ==
Points were awarded as follows:

Position	**1st**	**2nd**	**3rd**	**4th**	**5th**	**6th**	**7th**	**8th**	**9th**	**10th**	**Pole**	**FL**
Points	25	18	15	12	10	8	6	4	2	1	5	1

=== Drivers' standings ===
Pos	Driver	BEI1		BEI2		SHI		ZHU1		ZHU2		Pts
1	(Colombia) Julio Acosta	1	1	1	1	**4**	1	**1**	1			202
2	(China) Wu Ruopeng	3	3	5	2	2	2	2	2	1	2	174
3	(China) Liu Kai	2	2	**3**	4	3	3	DSQ	4	2	1	156
4	(China) Liu Wenlong	5	Ret	4	6	5	5	3	6	**3**	Ret	93
5	(China) Cui Yue	**DNS**	DNS	2	Ret	1	6	DSQ	5	Ret	Ret	66
6	(China) Tai Yi	Ret	Ret	Ret	5	6	4	4	8	6	6	62
7	(China) Xie Ruilin	7	5	6	6	9	9	Ret	DNS	5	3	57
8	(China) Yang Peng	6	9	8	Ret	7	7					26
9	(China) Hua Miao	4	4									24
10	(China) Lin Taian									4	4	24
11	(China) Chen Zhuoxuan					8	8	5	7			24
12	(China) Qin Tianqi			6	3							23
13	(Brazil) Bruno Carneiro							Ret	3			16
14	(China) Shang Zongyi									Ret	5	10
15	(China) He Weihang	10	6	Ret	Ret							9
16	(China) Wu Pei	9	7									8
17	(China) Zhang Chong	8	8									8
18	(China) Alex Yang			Ret	Ret							0
Pos	Driver	BEI1		BEI2		SHI		ZHU1		ZHU2		Pts

Colour	Result
Gold	Winner
Silver	Second place
Bronze	Third place
Green	Points classification
Blue	Non-points classification
Blue	Non-classified finish (NC)
Purple	Retired, not classified (Ret)
Red	Did not qualify (DNQ)
Red	Did not pre-qualify (DNPQ)
Black	Disqualified (DSQ)
White	Did not start (DNS)
White	Withdrew (WD)
White	Race cancelled (C)
Blank	Did not practice (DNP)
Blank	Did not arrive (DNA)
Blank	Excluded (EX)

**Bold** – Pole
Italics – Fastest Lap
