= F4 Chinese Championship =

Car racing series

- Category: FIA Formula 4
- Country: China
- Inaugural season: 2015–16
- Constructors: Mygale
- Engine suppliers: Alpine
- Tyre suppliers: Kumho
- Drivers' champion: (China) Shimo Zhang
- Teams' champion: (China) ACM Geeke Racing
- Official website: Official website

The F4 Chinese Championship (Chinese: FIA F4 中国锦标赛) is a racing series regulated according to FIA Formula 4. The inaugural season was the 2015–16 edition.

== History ==
Gerhard Berger and the FIA Singleseater Commission launched the FIA Formula 4 in March 2013. The goal of Formula 4 is to make the ladder to Formula 1 more transparent. It involves sporting and technical regulations and regulates costs. Cars competing in this category are not allowed to cost more than €30,000. A single season in a Formula 4 may not exceed €100,000. The Spanish F4 is planned to be one of the second phase Formula 4 championships. The first phase championships was the Italian F4 Championship and the Formula 4 Sudamericana, which started in 2014. The Chinese championship was launched by Narcar International Racing Development Co., Ltd. on 11 September 2014.

== Car ==
The championship feature cars are designed and built by French race car constructor Mygale. The cars are made up of carbon fiber and has monocoque chassis. The engine of Generation 1 is made up of 2.0 turbo Geely G-Power JLD-4G20. The engine of Generation 2 is Alpine 1.3L turbo.

== Champions ==
=== Drivers ===
Season	Driver	Team	Races	Poles	Wins	Podiums	Fastest lap	Points	Margins
2015–16	(Colombia) Julio Acosta	(China) Champ Motorsport	8 of 10	2	7	7	5	202	28
2016	(Brazil) Bruno Carneiro	(United States) UMC Utah Motorsports Campus	15 of 15	1	8	14	7	302	115
2017	(Macau) Charles Leong	(Hong Kong) BlackArts Racing Team	17 of 21	4	12	14	11	345	99
2018	(Republic of Ireland) Jordan Dempsey	(Republic of Ireland) Pinnacle Motorsport	18 of 21	3	8	15	14	320	50
2019	(New Zealand) Conrad Clark	(Hong Kong) BlackArts Racing Team	17 of 17	3	12	16	10	379	77
2020	(China) He Zijian	(China) Smart Life Racing Team	10 of 10	1	2	7	4	193	40
2021	(Macau) Andy Chang	(China) Chengdu Tianfu International Circuit Team	10 of 10	1	1	9	2	254	99
2022	(Hong Kong) Gerrard Xie	(China) Smart Life Racing Team	14 of 14	7	12	13	11	375	164
2023	(Macau) Tiago Rodrigues	(China) Champ Motorsport	20 of 20	2	7	15	6	346	15
2024	(Sweden) Oscar Pedersen	(China) Venom Motorsport	18 of 18	3	4	14	6	320	19
2025	(China) Shimo Zhang	(China) Yinqiao ACM Geeke Racing	20 of 20	3	14	18	9	424	133

=== Teams ===
Season	Team	Poles	Wins	Podiums	Fastest lap	Points	Margins
2017	(Hong Kong) BlackArts Racing Team	4	15	29	12	685	259
2018	(Hong Kong) BlackArts Racing Team	3	8	18	5	478	143
2019	(Hong Kong) BlackArts Racing Team	3	12	20	10	479	2
2020	(China) LEO GEEKE Team	0	0	6	0	211	12
2021	(China) Chengdu Tianfu International Circuit Team	1	1	9	2	298	119
2022	(China) Smart Life Racing Team	7	12	21	11	586	401
2023	(China) Champ Motorsport	2	7	22	7	612	30
2024	(China) Black Blade Racing	4	8	24	11	529	109
2025	(China) Yinqiao ACM Geeke Racing	3	14	18	9	430	79

== Circuits ==
- **Bold** denotes a circuit is used in the 2026 season.

Number	Circuits	Rounds	Years
1	(China) **Zhuhai International Circuit**	18 (Note: Zhuhai International Circuit hosted 2 rounds in 2015–16, 2016, 2020, 2023 and 2025 seasons.)	2015–2021, 2023–present
2	(China) **Ningbo International Circuit**	14 (Note: Ningbo International Circuit hosted 3 rounds in 2018, and 2 rounds in 2017, 2022 and 2023 seasons.)	2017–2019, 2021–present
3	(China) **Shanghai International Circuit**	12 (Note: Shanghai International Circuit hosted 3 rounds in 2019 and 2 rounds in 2017 and 2024 seasons.)	2015–2019, 2024–present
4	(China) Goldenport Park Circuit	3 (Note: Goldenport Park Circuit hosted 2 rounds in 2015–16 season.)	2015–2017
4	(China) Chengdu Goldenport Circuit	3	2016–2018
4	(Macau) Guia Circuit	3	2020–2022
4	(China) **Chengdu Tianfu International Circuit**	3	2024–present
8	(China) Pingtan Ruyi Lake International Circuit	2	2022–2023
9	(China) Wuhan Street Circuit	1	2018
9	(China) Qinhuangdao Shougang Racing Valley	1	2019
9	(China) **V1 Auto World Tianjin**	1	2026
9	(China) **Hunan International Circuit**	1	2026

== See also ==
- China Formula Grand Prix
