= Champ Motorsport =

Chinese auto racing team

(China) Champ Motorsport
- Founded: 2003
- Team principal(s): Michael Ho Wai Kun
- Current series: F4 Chinese Championship
- Former series: China Touring Car Championship; Formula V6 Asia; Formula BMW Asia; TCR International Series; Formula Masters China; TCR Asia Series; Asian Formula Renault Series; World Touring Car Cup
- Noted drivers: F4 Chinese Championship; 68. (China) Wang Yi; 91. (Hong Kong) Kimi Chan
- Teams' Championships: Asian Formula Renault Series: 2013; F4 Chinese Championship: 2023
- Drivers' Championships: Asian Formula Renault Series: 2005 (Hanss Lin); 2013 (Julio Acosta); F4 Chinese Championship: 2015–16 (Julio Acosta); 2023 (Tiago Rodrigues)
- Website: http://eng.champ.cc/eng.champ.cc/index.html

Champ Motorsport is a Chinese auto racing team based in Zhuhai, China. The team has raced in the TCR International Series, since 2016. Having also raced in the TCR Asia Series, Asian Formula Renault Series and China Formula 4 Championship amongst others.

== Asian Formula Renault Series ==
Having first entered the championship in 2004. The team returned in 2005 and won the championship with Taiwanese driver Hanss Lin. The team kept entering the series for many years before again winning the title in 2013 with Colombian driver Julio Acosta.

== Formula 4 Chinese Championship ==
The team entered the first season of the China F4 series with Chinese drivers Chen Zhuoxuan, Liu Wenlong, Yang Fan and Xie Ruilin alongside 2013 Asian Formula Renault champion Julio Acosta. Acosta took seven out of eight possible victories, with Acosta having secured the title at the fourth round out of five of the championship. Acosta therefore did not take part in the final round of the 2015–16 season. For 2016 the team entered Liu Wenlong and Xie Ruilin again for a second season with the team.

== Formula Masters China ==
The team made a one-off appearance in the series at their home circuit at Zhuhai International Circuit, with the team entering Xie Ruilin and Leong Hon Chio for the event.

== TCR Asia Series ==
The team entered the Asian TCR series for 2016, with Henry Ho and Michael Ho driving a Honda Civic TCR each. The team finished fourth in the Teams' championship, with Henry Ho having taken three podiums.

== TCR International Series ==
=== Honda Civic TCR (2016–) ===
After having raced in the 2016 TCR Asia Series, the team entered the 2016 TCR International Series with TCR Asia regular driver Michael Ho driving a Honda Civic TCR. However, Ho withdrew from 2016 Guia Race of Macau before the first practice session.

== Current series results ==
=== F4 Chinese Championship ===
Year	Car	Drivers	Races	Wins	Poles	F/Laps	Podiums	Points	D.C.	T.C.
2015-16	Mygale M14-F4	(Colombia) Julio Acosta	8	7	2	5	9	202	1st	N/A
2015-16	Mygale M14-F4	(China) Liu Wenlong	10	0	1	0	2	93	4th	N/A
2015-16	Mygale M14-F4	(China) Xie Ruilin	9	0	0	0	1	57	7th	N/A
2015-16	Mygale M14-F4	(China) Chen Zhuoxuan	4	0	0	0	0	24	11th	N/A
2015-16	Mygale M14-F4	(China) Alex Yang	2	0	0	0	0	0	18th	N/A
2016	Mygale M14-F4	(Hong Kong) Xie Ruilin	15	0	0	0	1	109	6th	N/A
2016	Mygale M14-F4	(China) Liu Wenlong	8	0	0	0	1	50	10th	N/A
2016	Mygale M14-F4	(Germany) Yves Volte	3	0	0	0	1	0	NC	N/A
2017	Mygale M14-F4	(China) Ryan Liu	11	0	0	0	0	39	11th	5th
2017	Mygale M14-F4	(Indonesia) David Sitanala	2	0	0	0	2	30	12th	5th
2017	Mygale M14-F4	(China) Lin Taian	20	1	0	1	9	242	3rd	3rd (Note: Entered as MRS Motorsport)
2017	Mygale M14-F4	(China) Tai Yi†	20	0	0	1	3	156	5th	3rd
2017	Mygale M14-F4	(Hong Kong) Xie Ruilin	14	0	0	0	2	131	6th	3rd
2017	Mygale M14-F4	(Colombia) Julio Acosta	3	1	1	1	1	0	NC	3rd
2020	Mygale M14-F4	(China) Zeng Yucheng	10	0	0	0	0	4	18th	11th
2021	Mygale M14-F4	(China) Hu Chengru	8	0	0	0	0	63	6th	7th
2021	Mygale M14-F4	(Hong Kong) Patrick Tsang	6	0	0	0	0	16	15th	7th
2022	Mygale M14-F4	(Hong Kong) Patrick Tsang	1	0	0	0	0	0	NC	15th
2022	Mygale M14-F4	(Macau) Andy Chang	2	1	1	2	2	0	NC	15th
2023	Mygale M14-F4	(Macau) Tiago Rodrigues	20	7	2	6	15	346	1st	1st
2023	Mygale M14-F4	(China) Zhang Hongyu	8	0	1	1	4	103	5th	1st
2023	Mygale M14-F4	(China) Hu Chengru	12	0	0	0	2	83	7th	1st
2023	Mygale M14-F4	(Hong Kong) Patrick Tsang	19	0	0	0	1	49	12th	1st
2023	Mygale M14-F4	(Hong Kong) Marco Lau	19	0	0	0	0	28	17th	1st
2023	Mygale M14-F4	(Macau) Albert Cheung	4	0	0	0	0	4	28th	1st
2024	Mygale M21-F4	(China) Wang Yi	18	0	0	0	0	68	10th	7th
2024	Mygale M21-F4	(Macau) Marcus Cheong	4	0	0	0	0	0	35th	7th
2024	Mygale M21-F4	(Hong Kong) Patrick Tsang	16	0	0	0	0	4	24th	13th (Note: Entered as Kai Fei Motorsport)
2024	Mygale M21-F4	(Hong Kong) Kenny Chung	20	0	0	0	0	0	34th	13th
2024	Mygale M21-F4	(Hong Kong) Andy Law	17	0	0	0	0	2	27th	15th (Note: Entered as Champ Pro Racing)
2024	Mygale M21-F4	(Macau) Victor Yung	4	0	0	0	0	0	36th	15th
2024	Mygale M21-F4	(Macau) Albert Cheung	5	0	0	0	0	0	45th	15th
2024	Mygale M21-F4	(Hong Kong) Hugo So	2	0	0	0	0	0	38th	NC (Note: Entered as Skyline T-1 Racing by Champ Motorsport)
2024	Mygale M21-F4	(Hong Kong) Jacky Wong	10	0	0	0	0	0	43rd	NC
2025	Mygale M21-F4	(Hong Kong) Kimi Chan	20	1	4	5	10	291	2nd	2nd
2025	Mygale M21-F4	(China) Wang Yi	16	0	0	0	1	60	11th	2nd
2025	Mygale M21-F4	(Hong Kong) Denise Yeung	4	0	0	0	0	0	31st	2nd
2025	Mygale M21-F4	(Hong Kong) Andy Law	20	0	0	0	0	14	15th	10th
2025	Mygale M21-F4	(Hong Kong) Patrick Tsang	20	0	0	0	0	3	25th	10th
2025	Mygale M21-F4	(Macau) Tiago Rodrigues	4	0	0	0	1	0	NC	NC
2026	Mygale M21-F4	(Hong Kong) Ken Chow								
2026	Mygale M21-F4	(Hong Kong) Chow Chun Shing								
2026	Mygale M21-F4	(Hong Kong) Patrick Tsang								
2026	Mygale M21-F4	(Hong Kong) Andy Law								
2026	Mygale M21-F4	(China) Alfred Lao								
2026	Mygale M21-F4	(China) Yu Haoxi								
2026	Mygale M21-F4	(Hong Kong) Kimi Chan								
2026	Mygale M21-F4	(China) Zhao Zjiun								

† Yi drove for Glory Racing Team until round 6.

== Former series results ==
=== World Touring Car Cup ===
Year	Car	Drivers	Races	Wins	Poles	F/Laps	Podiums	Points	D.C.	T.C.
2018	Audi RS 3 LMS TCR	(Macau) Filipe de Souza	3	0	0	0	0	0	40th	NC
2018	Audi RS 3 LMS TCR	(Macau) Lam Kam San	0	0	0	0	0	0	NC	NC

=== TCR International Series ===
Year	Car	Drivers	Races	Wins	Poles	F/Laps	Podiums	Points	D.C.	T.C.
2016	Honda Civic Type R TCR (FK2)	(Macau) Michael Ho	0	0	0	0	0	0	NC	NC

=== TCR Asia Series ===
Year	Car	Drivers	Races	Wins	Poles	F/Laps	Podiums	Points	D.C.	T.C.
2016	Honda Civic TCR	(Macau) Henry Ho	6	0	0	0	3	70	5th	4th
2016	Honda Civic TCR	(Macau) Michael Ho	3	0	0	0	0	18	12th	4th
2018	Audi RS 3 LMS TCR	(Macau) Filipe de Souza	2	0	0	0	0	0	NC	NC
2018	Audi RS 3 LMS TCR	(Macau) Ryan Wong	2	0	0	0	0	0	NC	NC
2019	Audi RS 3 LMS TCR	(Macau) Filipe de Souza	4	0	0	0	0	0	NC	NC
2019	Audi RS 3 LMS TCR	(Hong Kong) James Wong	4	0	0	0	0	0	NC	NC
2019	Volkswagen Golf GTI TCR	(Hong Kong) Michael Wong	2	0	0	0	0	0	NC	NC

=== Formula Masters China ===
Year	Car	Drivers	Races	Wins	Poles	F/Laps	Podiums	Points	D.C.
2016	Tatuus FA010	(Macau) Hon Chio Leong†	9	0	0	0	2	61	7th
2016	Tatuus FA010	(Hong Kong) Xie Ruilin	2	0	0	0	0	4	15th

† Leong drove for DP Motorsport from round 4 onwards.

=== Formula BMW Pacific ===
Year	Car	Drivers	Races	Wins	Poles	F/Laps	Podiums	Points	D.C.	T.C.
2009	Mygale FB02	(Hong Kong) Jim Ka To	1	0	0	0	0	0	NC	N/A
2010	Mygale FB02	(Hong Kong) Jim Ka To	1	0	0	0	0	0	NC	NC
2010	Mygale FB02	(Macau) Ivo Yiu	1	0	0	0	0	0	NC	NC
2010	Mygale FB02	(Macau) Wai Kai Un	1	0	0	0	0	0	NC	NC

=== Formula V6 Asia ===
Year	Car	Drivers	Races	Wins	Poles	F/Laps	Podiums	Points	D.C.	T.C.
2006	Tatuus-Renault V4Y RS	(Macau) Michael Ho	8	0	0	0	0	23	8th	5th
2006	Tatuus-Renault V4Y RS	(Taiwan) Jeffrey Lee	10	0	0	0	0	19	10th	5th
2006	Tatuus-Renault V4Y RS	(China) Adderly Fong	2	0	0	0	1	15	12th	5th
2007	Tatuus-Renault V4Y RS	(Taiwan) Hanss Lin	9	0	0	2	3	59	4th	3rd
2007	Tatuus-Renault V4Y RS	(China) Adderly Fong	11	0	0	0	1	51	6th	3rd
2007	Tatuus-Renault V4Y RS	(Taiwan) Jeffrey Lee	11	0	0	0	0	31	11th	5th (Note: Entered as Super Champ Racing)
2007	Tatuus-Renault V4Y RS	(China) Marchy Lee†	5	1	1	1	2	28	12th	5th
2008	Tatuus-Renault V4Y RS	(Taiwan) Kevin Chen	12	0	1	1	4	73	6th	4th
2008	Tatuus-Renault V4Y RS	(Macau) Michael Ho	4	0	0	0	0	19	9th	4th
2008	Tatuus-Renault V4Y RS	(France) Mathias Beche	2	0	0	0	0	0	13th	4th
2009	Tatuus-Renault V4Y RS	(Hong Kong) Geoffrey Kwong‡	4	0	0	0	2	36	3rd	2nd
2009	Tatuus-Renault V4Y RS	(Taiwan) Kevin Chen	2	0	0	0	2	22	4th	2nd
2009	Tatuus-Renault V4Y RS	(Macau) Michael Ho	4	0	0	0	0	20	5th	2nd

† Marchy Lee drove for Team Meritus in round 1.

‡ Kwong drove for Dilango Racing in round 1.

=== Formula Trophy UAE ===
Year	Car	Drivers	Races	Wins	Poles	F/Laps	Podiums	Points	D.C.	T.C.
2024	Tatuus F4-T421	(United States) Jia Zhanbin	7	0	0	0	0	0	21st	7th
2024	Tatuus F4-T421	(China) Meng Cheng	5	0	0	0	0	0	25th	7th
2024	Tatuus F4-T421	(Hong Kong) Andy Law	2	0	0	0	0	0	26th	7th

== Timeline ==
Current series
F4 Chinese Championship	2015–2017, 2020–present
Former series
Asian Formula Renault Series	2004–2017
Formula V6 Asia	2006–2009
Formula BMW Pacific	2009–2010
Formula Masters China	2016
TCR International Series	2016
TCR Asia Series	2016, 2018–2019
World Touring Car Cup	2018
TCR China Touring Car Championship	2018–2020
Formula 4 South East Asia Championship	2023
Formula Trophy UAE	2024
