= Penbay International Circuit =

Motorsport circuit in Donggang, Pingtung County, Taiwan

DaPeng Bay International Circuit
大鵬灣國際賽車場
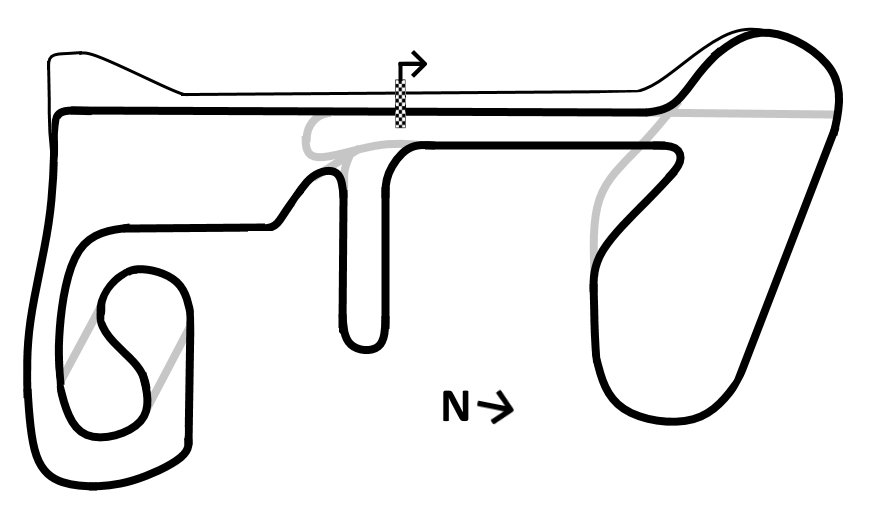
- International Circuit (2011–2019)
- Location: Donggang, Pingtung County, Taiwan
- Coordinates: 22°27′10″N 120°28′52″E
- FIA Grade: 2
- Opened: 9 October 2011; 14 years ago
- Closed: 16 July 2019; 6 years ago
- Major events: Former: Audi R8 LMS Cup (2015–2016); Formula Masters China (2015–2016); Asia Road Racing Championship (2012)
- Website: http://www.pic-taiwan.com/

International Circuit (2011–2019)
- Length: 3.527 (Note: FIA International Track length) km (2.192 mi)
- Turns: 17

DaPeng Bay International Circuit (PIC; Chinese: 大鵬灣國際賽車場; pinyin: Dàpéng Wān Guójì Sàichē Chǎng) is a motor sport circuit in Donggang Township, Pingtung County, Taiwan. The circuit is 3.527 km (2.192 mi) long with widths from 12m to 20m. It has five configurations. It officially opened on 9 October 2011.

Irish driver Gary Thompson helped officially open Taiwan's all-new circuit by driving a Minardi F1 two seater race car around the track.

Circuit manager Xu Hong-Bin claims that the track is the first circuit in Taiwan to satisfy FIA Grade 2 standard and from 2012 the track will host international events.

The track was closed on 16 July 2019, with only the nearby go-kart track remaining open.

== 2012 Lamborghini Blancpain Super Trofeo Asia ==
Automobili Lamborghini and Blancpain announced a new series, 2012 Lamborghini Blancpain Super Trofeo Asia, to run alongside the established European competition. Building on the series' success, the Asian Lamborghini Blancpain Super Trofeo will debut in Sepang, Malaysia in May 2012 with five further race weekends across Japan, China and Taiwan, possibly at Penbay. But the track failed to receive its FIA certification in time to host the race.

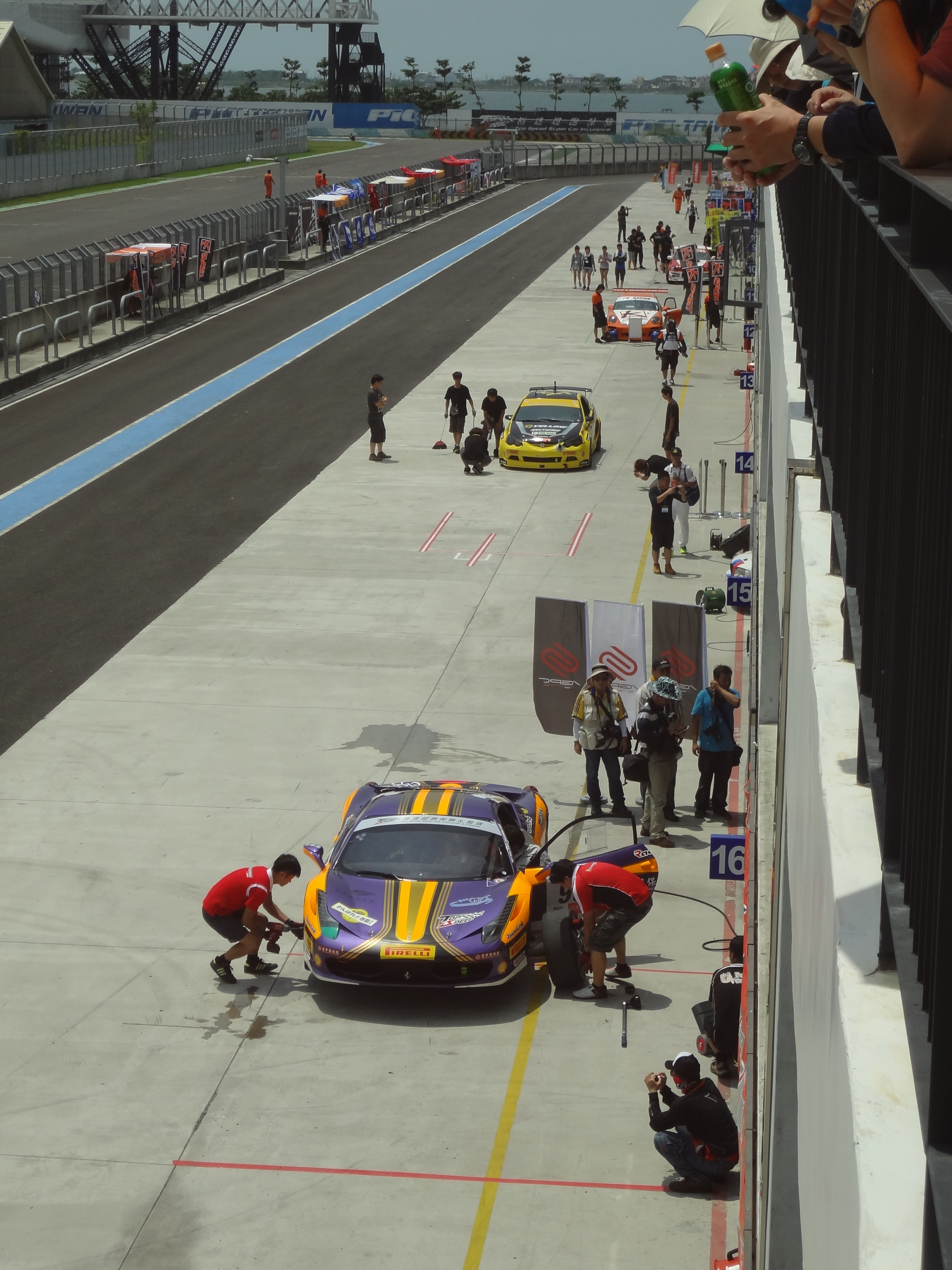
2013 Taiwan Speed Festival

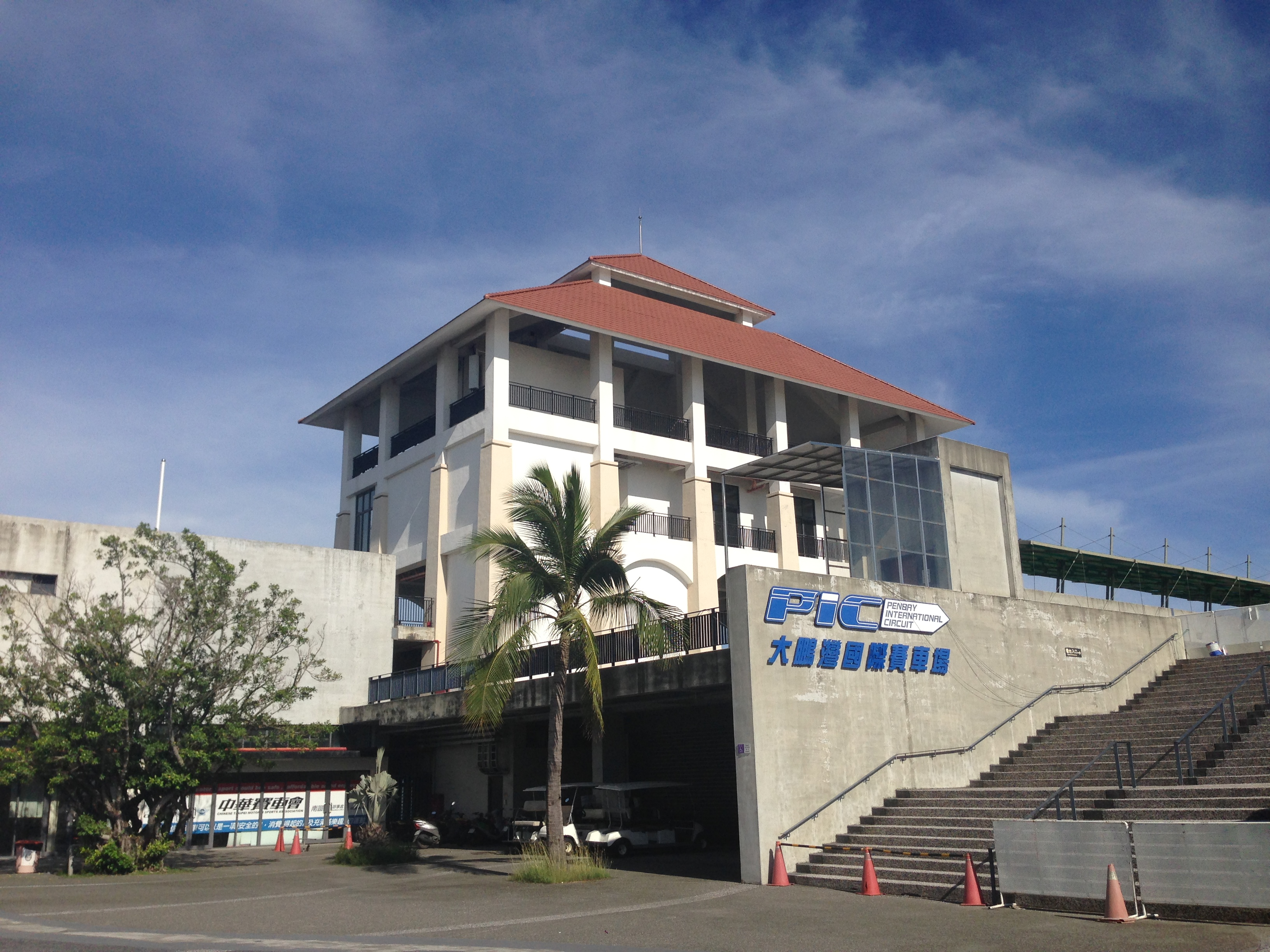
Image from circuit
