= Ningbo International Circuit =

Motorsport race track in China

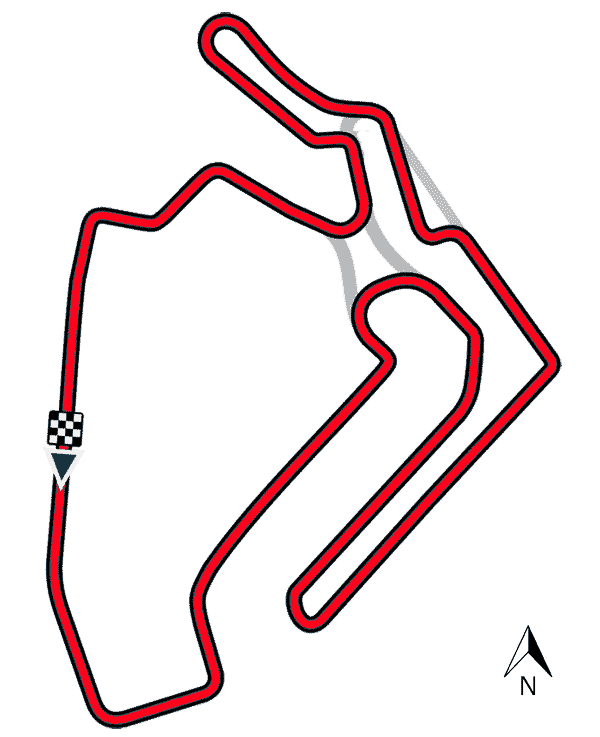
- Full Circuit (2017–present)
- Location: Beilun, Ningbo, Zhejiang, China
- Coordinates: 29°45′41″N 121°51′50″E
- FIA Grade: 2
- Owner: Geely (2017–present)
- Broke ground: December 2015; 10 years ago
- Opened: August 2017; 9 years ago
- Architect: Alan Wilson
- Major events: Current: Lamborghini Super Trofeo Asia (2026); TCR China (2017–2019, 2024–present); F4 China (2017–2019, 2021–present); Former: WTCR; Race of China (2018–2019); TCR Asia Series (2025); F3 Asia (2018); Blancpain GT Series Asia (2018); WTCC Race of China (2017)

Full Circuit (2017–present)
- Surface: Asphalt
- Length: 4.015 km (2.495 mi)
- Turns: 23
- Race lap record: 1:40.798 ( (United Kingdom) Jake Hughes, Tatuus F3 T-318, 2018, Formula Regional)

The Ningbo International Circuit is a motorsport race track near Chunxiao in Beilun, Ningbo, Zhejiang, China.

The circuit was built by Mitime, a subsidiary of automotive conglomerate Geely, and designed under supervision of Alan Wilson. It opened in August 2017 before its international debut in October, when it replaced Shanghai International Circuit as the venue for the World Touring Car Championship Race of China. The 4.015 km layout

== Events ==
Current

- May: Lamborghini Super Trofeo Asia, TCR China Touring Car Championship, TCR China Challenge, China GT Championship
- June: F4 Chinese Championship

Former

- Asian Formula Renault Series (2018)
- Audi R8 LMS Cup (2018)
- Blancpain GT Series Asia (2018)
- Clio Cup China Series (2018–2019)
- F3 Asian Championship (2018)
- Porsche Carrera Cup Asia (2021)
- TCR Asia Series (2025)
- World Touring Car Championship
  - FIA WTCC Race of China (2017)
- World Touring Car Cup
  - FIA WTCR Race of China (2018–2019)

== Lap records ==
As of May 2026, the fastest official race lap records at the Ningbo International Circuit are listed as:

| Category | Time | Driver | Vehicle | Event |
Full Circuit (2017–present): 4.015 km (2.495 mi)
| Formula Regional | 1:40.798 | Jake Hughes | Tatuus F3 T-318 | 2018 2nd Ningbo F3 Asian Championship round |
| GT3 | 1:41.572 | Raffaele Marciello | Mercedes-AMG GT3 | 2018 Ningbo Blancpain GT Series Asia round |
| Formula 4 | 1:45.920 | Zhang Shimo | Mygale M21-F4 | 2025 Ningbo Chinese F4 round |
| Lamborghini Super Trofeo | 1:46.815 | Chris van der Drift | Lamborghini Huracán LP 620-2 Super Trofeo EVO2 | 2026 Ningbo Lamborghini Super Trofeo Asia round |
| Porsche Carrera Cup | 1:48.605 | Hana Burton | Porsche 911 (992 I) GT3 Cup | 2026 Ningbo China GT round |
| Formula Renault 2.0 | 1:49.157 | Charles Leong | Tatuus FR2.0/13 | 2018 Ningbo Asian Formula Renault round |
| LMP3 | 1:49.971 | Josh Burdon | Ligier JS P3 | 2018 Ningbo Chinese LMP3 round |
| TCR Touring Car | 1:51.505 | Martin Xie Xin Zhe | Honda Civic Type R TCR (FL5) | 2024 Ningbo TCR China round |
| GT4 | 1:52.807 | Ethan Ho | BMW M4 GT4 Evo | 2026 Ningbo China GT round |
| TC1 | 2:03.753 | Esteban Guerrieri | Chevrolet RML Cruze TC1 | 2017 FIA WTCC Race of China |
| Clio Cup | 2:05.604 | He Yu | Renault Clio R.S. IV | 2018 Ningbo Clio Cup China round |
