= Daniel Cao =

Chinese racing driver (born 2001)

Daniel Cao 曹卓
- Nationality: (China) Chinese
- Born: 6 December 2001 (age 24) Shanghai, China

Championship titles
- 2018 2017–18: Asian Formula Renault Series; Formula 4 South East Asia Championship

Cao Zhuo (Chinese: 曹卓; pinyin: Cáo Zhuó; born 6 December 2001 in Shanghai), also known as Daniel Cao, is a Chinese former racing driver who last competed for Audi Sport Asia Team Absolute in the 2022 China Endurance Championship.

== Career ==
Cao began karting at the age of six at the Quyang Park Karting Field track. Cao made his debut in the China Karting Championship in 2010 and raced in the championship for three years, most notably winning the 2011 edition of it in the NCJ-A class, before finishing runner-up to Yifei Ye the following year in the NCJ-D class. Earning support from the Shanghai Volkswagen 333 team ahead of 2013, Cao won the first edition of the Xeramic Challenge in the junior class, and also made his debut in Japanese karting, competing in the Rotax Max Challenge Mizunami Series. In his final two years of karting, Cao won the 2016 RMC Japan Junior and Shanghai Kart Endurance championships ahead of his step up to junior formulae.

Making his single-seater debut with Asia Racing Team at the final round of the 2016 F4 Chinese Championship at Zhuhai, Cao took pole in the weekend's sole qualifying session, before finishing third in both the first two races and retiring in the third.

Following his fifteenth birthday, Cao joined Double R Racing to compete in the 2017 F4 British Championship. Cao competed in the first half of the season, taking a best result of seventh at Donington Park before leaving the series to return to Asia Racing Team in Asian Formula Renault. Despite missing the first two rounds, Cao won on debut at Zhejiang, and took five more podiums to finish fourth in the overall points. At the end of 2017, Cao also took part in the Meritus.GP-centrally run Formula 4 South East Asia Championship. After taking seven wins in the first half of the season, Cao took three more wins in the second half to take the title by 131 points over Kane Shepherd.

In 2018, Cao joined BlackArts Racing Team to compete in Asian Formula Renault on a full-time basis. Taking six wins across the season and missing the podium only twice in the 12-race season, Cao took the Asian Formula Renault title 30 points ahead of Luo Kailuo. During 2018, Cao also returned to the F4 Chinese Championship, competing in the first two rounds of the season, in which he won all three races of the season-opening round at Ningbo.

Having made a one-off appearance in the F3 Asian Championship for Pinnacle Motorsport in 2018, Cao stepped up to the championship on a full-time basis the following year, joining Absolute Racing alongside Eshan Pieris. At the first round of the season at Sepang, Cao qualified on pole and took his maiden series podium by finishing third in race one. After taking five more podiums in the following three rounds, Cao won the first two races of the season-ending round at Shanghai to conclude the season third in points.

Cao returned to Absolute Racing for the 2019–20 F3 Asian Championship. After finishing third in race two of the season-opening round at Sepang, Cao sat out the following two rounds due to school commitments, and despite being announced to return for the second Sepang round, Cao did not return to the team nor the series.

In early 2020, Cao also participated in the Formula E rookie tests at Marrakech for Nio 333 FE Team, as he also joined the team as a development driver.

== Karting record ==
=== Karting career summary ===
| Season | Series | Team | Position |
|---|---|---|---|
| 2013 | RMC Asia Championship — Rotax Junior | Prodigy Racing | 7th |
| 2014 | CIK-FIA Karting Academy Trophy | Cao Chaofan | 15th |
| 2014 | Rotax Euro Challenge – Rotax Junior | Team TKP | 50th |
| 2015 | Rotax Euro Challenge – Rotax Junior | Team TKP | 46th |
| 2015 | IAME International Final – X30 Junior | | NC |
| 2016 | Rotax Max Challenge Japan – Rotax Junior | T.Global | 7th |

== Racing record ==
=== Racing career summary ===
| Season | Series | Team | Races | Wins | Poles | F/Laps | Podiums | Points | Position |
|---|---|---|---|---|---|---|---|---|---|
| 2016 | F4 Chinese Championship | Asia Racing Team | 2 | 0 | 1 | 1 | 2 | 0 | NC |
| 2017 | F4 British Championship | Double R Racing | 14 | 0 | 0 | 0 | 0 | 7 | 18th |
| 2017 | Asian Formula Renault Series – Class A | Asia Racing Team | 8 | 1 | 0 | 2 | 6 | 168 | 4th |
| 2017 | F4 Chinese Championship | BlackArts Motorsport Team | 2 | 0 | 1 | 0 | 1 | 27 | 16th |
| 2017–18 | Formula 4 South East Asia Championship | Meritus.GP | 29 | 10 | 2 | 8 | 21 | 508 | **1st** |
| 2018 | Asian Formula Renault Series | BlackArts Racing Team | 12 | 6 | 6 | 5 | 10 | 219 | **1st** |
| 2018 | F4 Chinese Championship | BlackArts Racing Team | 6 | 3 | 1 | 3 | 4 | 105 | 7th |
| 2018 | F3 Asian Championship | Pinnacle Motorsport | 3 | 0 | 0 | 0 | 0 | 7 | 19th |
| 2019 | F3 Asian Championship | Absolute Racing | 15 | 2 | 1 | 2 | 8 | 187 | **3rd** |
| 2019–20 | F3 Asian Championship | Absolute Racing | 3 | 0 | 0 | 0 | 1 | 31 | 12th |
| 2021 | China Endurance Championship – GT3-Pro-Pro | Audi Sport Asia Team Absolute | 1 | 0 | ? | ? | 1 | ? | ? |
| 2021 | China Endurance Championship – GT3-Pro-Am | YC Racing | 1 | 0 | ? | ? | 0 | ? | ? |
| 2022 | China Endurance Championship – GT3-Pro-Pro | Audi Sport Asia Team Absolute | 3 | 1 | 1 | ? | 1 | ? | ? |

=== Complete F4 Chinese Championship results ===
(key) (Races in bold indicate pole position; races in italics indicate fastest lap)

| Year | Entrant | 1 | 2 | 3 | 4 | 5 | 6 | 7 | 8 | 9 | 10 | 11 | 12 | 13 | 14 | 15 | 16 | 17 | 18 | 19 | 20 | 21 | Pos | Points |
|---|---|---|---|---|---|---|---|---|---|---|---|---|---|---|---|---|---|---|---|---|---|---|---|---|
| 2016 | Asia Racing Team | ZIC1; 1 | ZIC2; 2 | ZIC3; 3 | CGC; 1 | CGC; 2 | CGC; 3 | BGP; 1 | BGP; 2 | BGP; 3 | SIC; 1 | SIC; 2 | SIC; 3 | **ZIC2**; **1**; 3 | ZIC2; 2; 3 | ZIC2; 3 Ret | | | | | | | NC† | 0 |
| 2017 | BlackArts Racing Team | ZIC; 1 | ZIC; 2 | ZIC; 3 | CGC; 1 | CGC; 2 | CGC; 3 | BGP; 1 | BGP; 2 | BGP; 3 | **SIC1**; **1**; 4 | SIC1; 2; 3 | SIC1; 3 C | SIC2; 1 | SIC2; 2 | SIC2; 3 | NIC1; 1 | NIC1; 2 | NIC1; 3 | NIC2; 1 | NIC2; 2 | NIC2; 3 | 16th | 27 |
| 2018 | BlackArts Racing Team | **NIC1**; **1**; 1 | NIC1; 2; 1 | NIC1; 3; 1 | ZIC; 1; 2 | ZIC; 2; 9 | ZIC; 3; 5 | CGC; 1 | CGC; 2 | CGC; 3 | NIC2; 1 | NIC2; 2 | NIC2; 3 | SIC; 1 | SIC; 2 | SIC; 3 | WUH; 1 | WUH; 2 | WUH; 3 | NIC3; 1 | NIC3; 2 | NIC3; 3 | 7th | 105 |

=== Complete F4 British Championship results ===
(key) (Races in bold indicate pole position; races in italics indicate fastest lap)

| Year | Team | 1 | 2 | 3 | 4 | 5 | 6 | 7 | 8 | 9 | 10 | 11 | 12 | 13 | 14 | 15 | 16 | 17 | 18 | 19 | 20 | 21 | 22 | 23 | 24 | 25 | 26 | 27 | 28 | 29 | 30 | 31 | DC | Points |
|---|---|---|---|---|---|---|---|---|---|---|---|---|---|---|---|---|---|---|---|---|---|---|---|---|---|---|---|---|---|---|---|---|---|---|
| 2017 | Double R Racing | BRI; 1; 11 | BRI; 2; 12 | BRI; 3; 16 | DON; 1 Ret | DON; 2; 9 | DON; 3; 7 | THR; 1; 11 | THR; 2; 11 | THR; 3; 10 | OUL; 1; 11 | OUL; 2; 9 | OUL; 3 C | CRO; 1 Ret | CRO; 2 Ret | CRO; 3; 15 | SNE; 1 | SNE; 2 | SNE; 3 | KNO; 1 | KNO; 2 | KNO; 3 | KNO; 4 | ROC; 1 | ROC; 2 | ROC; 3 | SIL; 1 | SIL; 2 | SIL; 3 | BHGP; 1 | BHGP; 2 | BHGP; 3 | 18th | 7 |

=== Complete F3 Asian Championship results ===
(key) (Races in bold indicate pole position) (Races in italics indicate fastest lap)

| Year | Entrant | 1 | 2 | 3 | 4 | 5 | 6 | 7 | 8 | 9 | 10 | 11 | 12 | 13 | 14 | 15 | Pos | Points |
|---|---|---|---|---|---|---|---|---|---|---|---|---|---|---|---|---|---|---|
| 2018 | Pinnacle Motorsport | SEP1; 1; 9 | SEP1; 2; 8 | SEP1; 3; 10 | NIS1; 1 | NIS1; 2 | NIS1; 3 | SIC; 1 | SIC; 2 | SIC; 3 | NIS2; 1 | NIS2; 2 | NIS2; 3 | SEP2; 1 | SEP2; 2 | SEP2; 3 | 19th | 7 |
| 2019 | Absolute Racing | **SEP**; **1**; 3 | SEP; 2; 4 | SEP; 3; 7 | CHA; 1; 3 | CHA; 2; 3 | CHA; 3; 9 | SUZ; 1; 4 | SUZ; 2; 2 | SUZ; 3 Ret | SIC1; 1; 2 | SIC1; 2; 2 | SIC1; 3 Ret | SIC2; 1; 1 | SIC2; 2; 1 | SIC2; 3; 7 | 3rd | 187 |
| 2019–20 | Absolute Racing | SEP1; 1; 5 | SEP1; 2; 3 | SEP1; 3; 7 | DUB; 1 | DUB; 2 | DUB; 3 | ABU; 1 | ABU; 2 | ABU; 3 | SEP2; 1 | SEP2; 2 | SEP2; 3 | CHA; 1 | CHA; 2 | CHA; 3 | 12th | 31 |

Sporting positions
| Preceded by Presley Martono | Formula 4 South East Asia Championship; Champion; 2017–18 | Succeeded by Alessandro Ghiretti |
| Preceded by Charles Leong | Asian Formula Renault Series; Champion; 2018 | Succeeded by Joey Alders |
