= Alessandro Ghiretti =

French racing driver (born 2002)

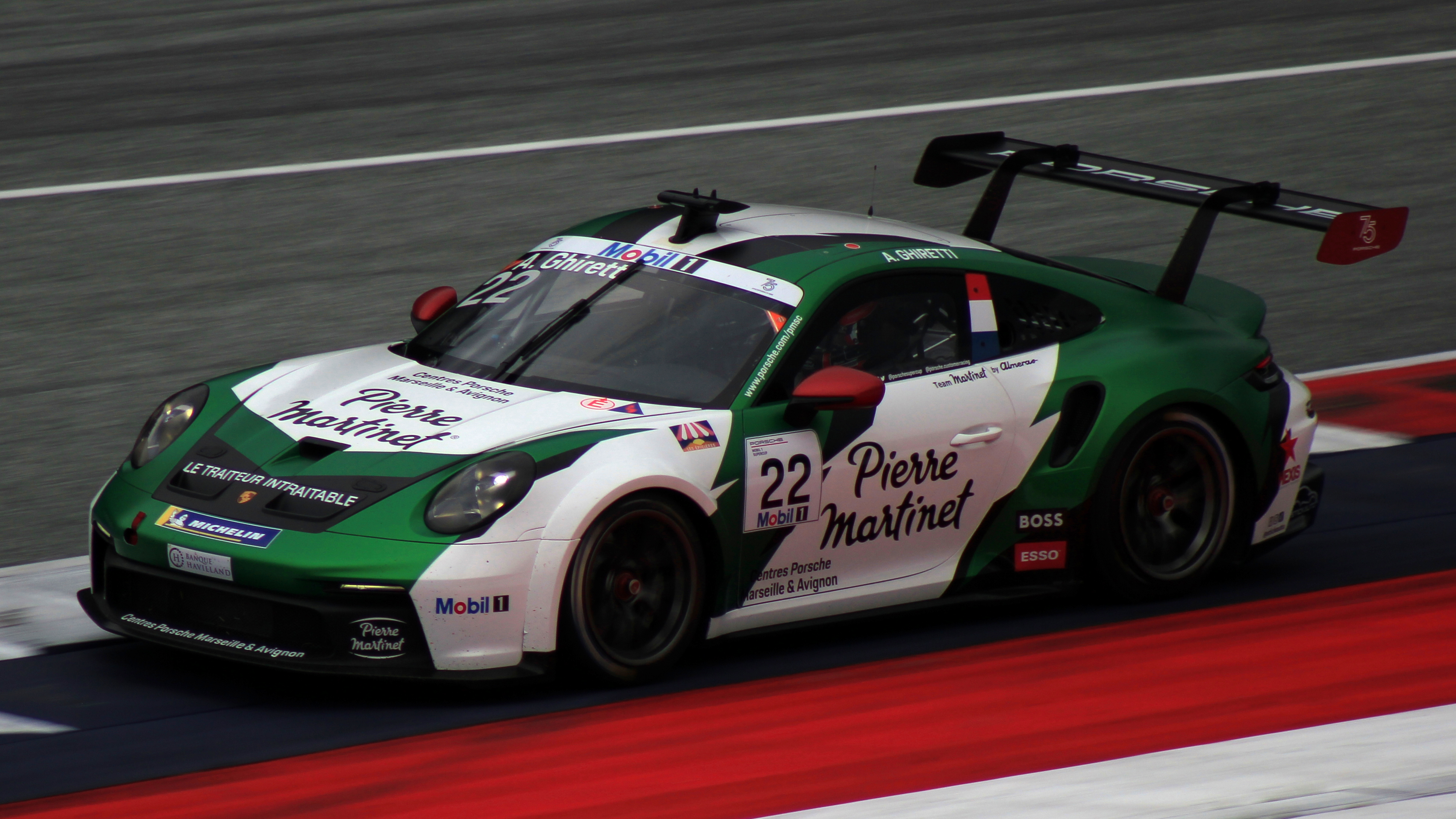
- Ghiretti at the Red Bull Ring in 2023
- Nationality: (France) French
- Born: 18 January 2002 (age 24) Montauban, France

ADAC Formula 4 career
- Debut season: 2019
- Categorisation: FIA Silver (until 2024); FIA Gold (2025–)
- Car number: 28
- Former teams: US Racing-CHRS
- Starts: 20
- Best finish: 6th in 2019

Previous series
- 2018-17: F4 South East Asia Championship

Championship titles
- 2018 2024 2024 2025: F4 South East Asia; Porsche Carrera Cup France; Porsche Carrera Cup Asia; Porsche Supercup

Awards
- 2017: Meritus Awards - Up & Coming Talent

Alessandro Ghiretti (born 18 January 2002 in Montauban) is a French racing driver and former member of the Sauber Junior Team.

== Early life ==
Ghiretti was born in Montauban to a family from Italian origins. His father Alain Ghiretti is an entrepreneur in metal construction. In the 1980s, his father was a racing driver in Formula Renault and Formula 3000. Since August 2017, Alessandro's family resides in Marrakesh.

== Career ==
=== Karting ===
Ghiretti began karting at the age of seven, claiming numerous titles in his career, including the first place of the 2016 X30 Junior IAME National Final in Lavilledieu and the third place of the Challenge Europa X30 Junior B in Castelletto.

=== Lower formulae ===
In 2017, Ghiretti stepped up to single-seaters, contesting the Italian F4 championship.

In December 2018, Ghiretti signed with the British team Dragon Hitech GP to run in the 2019 F3 Asian Championship, both the winter and main sessions.

In 2019, Ghiretti contested the ADAC Formula 4 Championship and Italian F4 Championship with US Racing-CHRS. In November, he attended the post-season tests of the Formula Renault Eurocup, at Autodromo Nazionale di Monza with ART Grand Prix and at Circuit Paul Ricard with Bhaitech. In March 2020, he took part in the pre-season test at Circuit Ricardo Tormo with MP Motorsport.

=== Formula One ===
As part of his signing with US Racing-CHRS, Ghiretti was named as part of the Sauber Junior Team's 2019 line-up.

== Racing record ==
=== Career summary ===
| Season | Series | Team | Races | Wins | Poles | F. Laps | Podiums | Points | Position |
|---|---|---|---|---|---|---|---|---|---|
| 2017 | Italian F4 Championship | BDL Motorsport | 6 | 0 | 0 | 0 | 0 | 0 | NC† |
| 2017–18 | Formula 4 South East Asia Championship | Meritus.GP | 6 | 1 | 0 | 1 | 5 | 92 | 11st |
| 2018 | Formula 4 South East Asia Championship | Meritus.GP | 24 | 14 | 4 | 12 | 21 | 446 | **1st** |
| 2018 | French F4 Championship | FFSA Academy | 6 | 0 | 0 | 0 | 2 | 0 | NC† |
| 2019 | ADAC Formula 4 Championship | US Racing-CHRS | 20 | 0 | 0 | 0 | 3 | 136 | 6th |
| 2019 | F3 Asian Winter Series | Dragon Hitech GP | 9 | 0 | 0 | 0 | 4 | 106 | **3rd** |
| 2020 | Le Mans Cup - LMP3 | Team Virage | 1 | 0 | 0 | 1 | 0 | 0 | NC† |
| 2020 | Ultimate Cup Series - Proto P3 | Team Virage | 3 | 2 | ? | ? | 3 | 68 | **2nd** |
| 2021 | Porsche Carrera Cup France | Martinet by Alméras | 12 | 0 | 0 | 1 | 6 | 181 | 4th |
| 2021 | Porsche Supercup | Martinet by Alméras | 1 | 0 | 0 | 0 | 0 | 0 | NC† |
| 2022 | Porsche Carrera Cup France | Martinet by Alméras | 12 | 0 | 0 | 0 | 5 | 139 | **3rd** |
| 2022 | Ultimate Cup Series Endurance GT-Touring Challenge - Porsche Cup | Martinet by Alméras | 2 | 0 | 2 | 1 | 1 | 28 | 9th |
| 2023 | Ultimate Cup Series Endurance GT-Touring Challenge - Porsche Cup | Martinet by Alméras | 3 | 1 | 1 | 1 | 1 | 37 | 11st |
| 2023 | Porsche Supercup | Martinet by Alméras | 8 | 0 | 0 | 0 | 1 | 64 | 7th |
| 2023 | Porsche Sprint Challenge Southern Europe - Sport Division - Pro | Martinet by Alméras | 1 | 1 | 0 | 0 | 1 | 37 | 8th |
| 2023 | Porsche Carrera Cup France | Martinet by Alméras | 11 | 2 | 1 | 2 | 10 | 215 | **2nd** |
| 2024 | Porsche Supercup | Schumacher CLRT | 8 | 1 | 0 | 1 | 1 | 85 | 6th |
| 2024 | Porsche Carrera Cup France | Schumacher CLRT | 12 | 9 | 10 | 11 | 12 | 303 | **1st** |
| 2024 | Porsche Carrera Cup Asia | Team Jebsen | 14 | 8 | 2 | 9 | 12 | 308 | **1st** |
| 2025 | Porsche Carrera Cup Australia - Pro | EMA Motorsport | 3 | 1 | 0 | 1 | 1 | 121 | 18th |
| 2025 | Porsche Carrera Cup Germany | Schumacher CLRT | 16 | 4 | 5 | 4 | 9 | 262 | **2nd** |
| 2025 | Porsche Supercup | Schumacher CLRT | 8 | 3 | 1 | 4 | 6 | 130.5 | **1st** |
| 2025 | GT World Challenge Europe Endurance Cup | Schumacher CLRT | 1 | 0 | 0 | 0 | 0 | 2 | 26th |
| 2025 | Nürburgring Langstrecken-Serie - AT3 | Four Motors Bionconcept-Car | 2 | 0 | 0 | 0 | 2 | 0 | NC† |
| 2025–26 | 24H Series Middle East - GT3 | B-Quik Absolute Racing | 1 | 0 | 0 | 0 | 0 | 17th | 20 |
| 2025–26 | 24H Series Middle East - GT3 | EBM | 1 | 0 | 0 | 0 | 0 | 17th | 20 |
| 2025–26 | 24H Series Middle East - 992 | EBM | 1 | 0 | 0 | 0 | 0 | 0 | NC† |
| 2026 | GT World Challenge Asia | Absolute Racing | 12 | 2 | 1 | 1 | 5 | 143 | **2nd** |
| 2026 | GT World Challenge Europe Endurance Cup | Boutsen VDS | 4 | 0 | 0 | 0 | 0 | 0 | NC† |
| 2026 | GT World Challenge Europe Endurance Cup - Gold | Boutsen VDS | 4 | 0 | 0 | 0 | 1 | 30 | 12nd |
| 2026 | Nürburgring Langstrecken-Serie - SP9 | Dinamic GT | 1 | 0 | 0 | 0 | 0 | 0 | NC† |
| 2026 | 24 Hours of Nürburgring - SP9 | Dinamic GT | 1 | 0 | 0 | 0 | 0 | 0 | DNF |
| 2026 | TSS The Super Series - GT3 | B-Quik Absolute Racing | 6 | 0 | 1 | 0 | 4 | 80* | 5th* |
| 2026 | Porsche Carrera Cup Asia | Team Carrera Cup Asia by Tempo | 2 | 0 | 0 | 1 | 1 | 0 | NC† |
| 2026 | Intercontinental GT Challenge | Dinamic GT; Boutsen VDS; Absolute Racing | 3 | 0 | 0 | 0 | 1 | 15 | 22nd |

^{†} As Ghiretti was a guest driver, he was ineligible for points. ^{*} Season still in progress.

=== Complete Italian F4 Championship results ===
(key) (Races in bold indicate pole position) (Races in italics indicate fastest lap)

| Year | Team | 1 | 2 | 3 | 4 | 5 | 6 | 7 | 8 | 9 | 10 | 11 | 12 | 13 | 14 | 15 | 16 | 17 | 18 | 19 | 20 | 21 | Pos | Points |
|---|---|---|---|---|---|---|---|---|---|---|---|---|---|---|---|---|---|---|---|---|---|---|---|---|
| 2017 | BDL Motorsport | MIS; 1; 17 | MIS; 2; 22 | MIS; 3; 22 | ADR; 1; 15 | ADR; 2; 18 | ADR; 3; 17 | VAL; 1 | VAL; 2 | VAL; 3 | MUG1; 1 | MUG1; 2 | MUG1; 3 | IMO; 1 | IMO; 2 | IMO; 3 | MUG2; 1 | MUG2; 2 | MUG2; 3 | MNZ; 1 | MNZ; 2 | MNZ; 3 | NC | 0 |

=== Complete Formula 4 South East Asia Championship results ===
(key) (Races in bold indicate pole position) (Races in italics indicate fastest lap)

| Year | 1 | 2 | 3 | 4 | 5 | 6 | 7 | 8 | 9 | 10 | 11 | 12 | 13 | 14 | 15 | 16 | 17 | 18 | 19 | 20 | 21 | 22 | 23 | 24 | 25 | 26 | 27 | 28 | 29 | 30 | Pos | Points |
|---|---|---|---|---|---|---|---|---|---|---|---|---|---|---|---|---|---|---|---|---|---|---|---|---|---|---|---|---|---|---|---|---|
| 2017-18 | SEP1; 1 | SEP1; 2 | SEP1; 3 | SEP1; 4 | SEP1; 5 | SEP1; 6 | CLA; 1 | CLA; 2 | CLA; 3 | CLA; 4 | CLA; 5 | CLA; 6 | CHA; 1 | CHA; 2 | CHA; 3 | CHA; 4 | CHA; 5 | CHA; 6 | SEP2; 1 | SEP2; 2 | SEP2; 3 | SEP2; 4 | SEP2; 5 | SEP2; 6 | SEP3; 1; 3 | SEP3; 2; 3 | SEP3; 3; 2 | SEP3; 4; 1 | SEP3; 5; 2 | SEP3; 6; 10 | 11th | 92 |
| 2018 | SEP1; 1; 1 | SEP1; 2; 6 | SEP1; 3; 2 | SEP2; 1; 2 | SEP2; 2; 1 | SEP2; 3 Ret | **MAD1**; **1**; 1 | MAD1; 2; 1 | MAD1; 3; 3 | **MAD2**; **1**; 1 | MAD2; 2; 2 | MAD2; 3; 2 | **CHA1**; **1**; 1 | CHA1; 2; 1 | CHA1; 3; 1 | CHA2; 1; 1 | CHA2; 2; 1 | CHA2; 3; 4 | SEP3; 1; 1 | SEP3; 2; 1 | SEP3; 3; 1 | **SEP4**; **1**; 1 | SEP4; 2; 2 | SEP4; 3; 2 | | | | | | | 1st | 446 |

=== Complete French F4 Championship results ===
(key) (Races in bold indicate pole position) (Races in italics indicate fastest lap)

| Year | 1 | 2 | 3 | 4 | 5 | 6 | 7 | 8 | 9 | 10 | 11 | 12 | 13 | 14 | 15 | 16 | 17 | 18 | 19 | 20 | 21 | Pos | Points |
|---|---|---|---|---|---|---|---|---|---|---|---|---|---|---|---|---|---|---|---|---|---|---|---|
| 2018 | NOG; 1 | NOG; 2 | NOG; 3 | PAU; 1 | PAU; 2 | PAU; 3 | SPA; 1 | SPA; 2 | SPA; 3 | DIJ; 1 | DIJ; 2 | DIJ; 3 | MAG; 1 | MAG; 2 | MAG; 3 | JER; 1; 3 | JER; 2; 9 | JER; 3; 2 | LEC; 1; 13 | LEC; 2; 9 | LEC; 3; 16 | NC | – |

=== Complete ADAC Formula 4 Championship results ===
(key) (Races in bold indicate pole position) (Races in italics indicate fastest lap)

| Year | Team | 1 | 2 | 3 | 4 | 5 | 6 | 7 | 8 | 9 | 10 | 11 | 12 | 13 | 14 | 15 | 16 | 17 | 18 | 19 | 20 | Pos | Points |
|---|---|---|---|---|---|---|---|---|---|---|---|---|---|---|---|---|---|---|---|---|---|---|---|
| 2019 | US Racing-CHRS | OSC; 1; 10 | OSC; 2; 7 | OSC; 3; 3 | RBR; 1; 2 | RBR; 2 Ret | RBR; 3; 6 | HOC; 1; 18 | HOC; 2; 6 | ZAN; 1; 13 | ZAN; 2; 4 | ZAN; 3; 2 | NÜR; 1; 4 | NÜR; 2; 4 | NÜR; 3; 4 | HOC; 1 Ret | HOC; 2; 14 | HOC; 3; 8 | SAC; 1; 8 | SAC; 2; 7 | SAC; 3 DSQ | 6th | 136 |

=== Complete F3 Asian Winter Series results ===
(key) (Races in bold indicate pole position) (Races in italics indicate fastest lap)

| Year | Team | 1 | 2 | 3 | 4 | 5 | 6 | 7 | 8 | 9 | Pos | Points |
|---|---|---|---|---|---|---|---|---|---|---|---|---|
| 2019 | Dragon Hitech GP | CHA; 1; 2 | CHA; 2; 5 | CHA; 3 Ret | SEP1; 1; 3 | SEP1; 2; 3 | SEP1; 3; 3 | SEP2; 1; 12 | SEP2; 2; 6 | SEP2; 3; 4 | 3rd | 106 |

=== Complete Porsche Carrera Cup France results ===
(key) (Races in bold indicate pole position) (Races in italics indicate fastest lap)

| Year | Team | 1 | 2 | 3 | 4 | 5 | 6 | 7 | 8 | 9 | 10 | 11 | 12 | Pos | Points |
|---|---|---|---|---|---|---|---|---|---|---|---|---|---|---|---|
| 2021 | Martinet by Alméras | MAG; 1; 2 | MAG; 2; 3 | LEC; 1; 5 | LEC; 2; 6 | SPA; 1; 4 | SPA; 2; 4 | MNZ; 1; 3 | MNZ; 2; 5 | CAT; 1; 3 | CAT; 2; 2 | ALG; 1 Ret | ALG; 2; 2 | 4th | 181 |
| 2022 | Martinet by Alméras | NOG; 1; 2 | NOG; 2; 2 | SPA; 1; 9 | SPA; 2; 7 | MAG; 1; 2 | MAG; 2; 5 | ZAN; 1; 2 | ZAN; 2 Ret | VAL; 1; 4 | VAL; 2 Ret | LEC; 1; 3 | LEC; 2 Ret | 3rd | 139 |
| 2023 | Martinet by Alméras | CAT; 1; 1 | **CAT**; **2**; 1 | MAG; 1; 2 | MAG; 2; 2 | LMS; 3 | RBR; 1; 3 | RBR; 2; 2 | MNZ; 1; 2 | MNZ; 2; 2 | LEC; 1; 2 | LEC; 2; 8 | | 2nd | 215 |
| 2024 | Schumacher CLRT | **CAT**; **1**; 1 | **CAT**; **2**; 1 | **LEC**; **1**; 1 | **LEC**; **2**; 3 | **SPA**; **1**; 1 | **SPA**; **2**; 1 | **DIJ**; **1**; 1 | **DIJ**; **2**; 1 | MUG; 1; 2 | MUG; 2; 2 | **ALG**; **1**; 1 | **ALG**; **2**; 1 | 1st | 303 |

^{*}Season still in progress.

=== Complete Porsche Supercup results ===
(key) (Races in bold indicate pole position) (Races in italics indicate fastest lap)

| Year | Team | 1 | 2 | 3 | 4 | 5 | 6 | 7 | 8 | Pos. | Points |
|---|---|---|---|---|---|---|---|---|---|---|---|
| 2021 | Martinet by Alméras | MON | RBR | RBR | HUN | SPA; 30 | ZND | MNZ | MNZ | NC† | 0 |
| 2023 | Martinet by Alméras | MON; Ret | RBR; 7 | SIL; 3 | HUN; Ret | SPA; 5 | ZND; 5 | ZND; 6 | MNZ; Ret | 7th | 64 |
| 2024 | Schumacher CLRT | IMO; Ret | MON; 8 | RBR; 6 | SIL; 5 | HUN; 6 | SPA; 5 | ZAN; 9 | MNZ; 1 | 5th | 85 |
| 2025 | Schumacher CLRT | IMO; Ret | MON; 3‡ | CAT; 1 | RBR; 3 | **SPA**; 1 | HUN; 6 | ZAN; 1 | MNZ; 2 | 1st | 130.5 |

^{†}As Ghiretti was a guest driver, he was ineligible for points.
^{‡} Half points awarded as less than 75% of race distance was completed.

=== Complete Porsche Carrera Cup Asia results ===
(key) (Races in bold indicate pole position; races in italics indicate points for the fastest lap of top ten finishers)

| Year | Entrant | Class | 1 | 2 | 3 | 4 | 5 | 6 | 7 | 8 | 9 | 10 | 11 | 12 | 13 | 14 | 15 | 16 | DC | Points |
|---|---|---|---|---|---|---|---|---|---|---|---|---|---|---|---|---|---|---|---|---|
| 2024 | Team Jebsen | Pro | SIC; 1; 3 | SIC; 2; 1 | **SUZ**; **1**; 1 | SUZ; 2; 1 | **CHA**; **1**; 1 | CHA; 2; 1 | BAN; 1 | BAN; 2 | SEP; 1; 12 | SEP; 2; 3 | SEP; 3; 1 | MRN; 1; 4 | MRN; 2; 2 | SIC; 1; 2 | SIC; 2; 1 | SIC; 3; 1 | 1st | 308 |

=== Complete Porsche Carrera Cup Germany results ===
(key) (Races in bold indicate pole position) (Races in italics indicate fastest lap)

| Year | Team | 1 | 2 | 3 | 4 | 5 | 6 | 7 | 8 | 9 | 10 | 11 | 12 | 13 | 14 | 15 | 16 | DC | Points |
|---|---|---|---|---|---|---|---|---|---|---|---|---|---|---|---|---|---|---|---|
| 2025 | Schumacher CLRT | IMO; 1; 4 | IMO; 2; 5 | **SPA**; **1**; 1 | SPA; 2; 2 | **ZAN**; **1**; 5 | **ZAN**; **2**; 1 | NOR; 1; 2 | NOR; 2; 4 | **NÜR**; **1**; 19 | **NÜR**; **2**; 1 | SAC; 1; 2 | SAC; 2; 1 | RBR; 1; 2 | RBR; 2; 13 | HOC; 1; 5 | HOC; 2; 2 | 2nd | 262 |

=== Complete GT World Challenge Europe results ===
==== GT World Challenge Europe Endurance Cup ====
(key) (Races in bold indicate pole position) (Races in italics indicate fastest lap)

| Year | Team | Car | Class | 1 | 2 | 3 | 4 | 5 | 6 | 7 | Pos. | Points |
|---|---|---|---|---|---|---|---|---|---|---|---|---|
| 2025 | Schumacher CLRT | Porsche 911 GT3 R (992) | Pro | LEC | MNZ | SPA; 6H | SPA; 12H | SPA; 24H | NÜR | CAT; 9 | 26th | 2 |
| 2026 | Boutsen VDS | Porsche 911 GT3 R (992.2) | Gold | LEC; Ret | MNZ; Ret | SPA; 6H; 17 | SPA; 12H; 16 | SPA; 24H; 22 | NÜR | ALG; Ret | 12th | 30 |

=== Complete GT World Challenge Asia results ===
(key) (Races in bold indicate pole position) (Races in italics indicate fastest lap)

| Year | Team | Car | 1 | 2 | 3 | 4 | 5 | 6 | 7 | 8 | 9 | 10 | 11 | 12 | Pos. | Points |
|---|---|---|---|---|---|---|---|---|---|---|---|---|---|---|---|---|
| 2026 | Absolute Racing | Porsche 911 GT3 R (992.2) | SEP; 1; 1 | SEP; 2; 3 | MAN; 1; 4 | MAN; 2; 2 | FUJ; 1; 9 | FUJ; 2; 6 | OKA; 1; 8 | OKA; 2 Ret | BEI; 1; 5 | **BEI**; **2**; 1 | SHA; 1; 7 | SHA; 2; 2 | 2nd | 143 |

Sporting positions
| Preceded by Daniel Cao | Formula 4 South East Asia Championship; Champion; 2018 | Succeeded by Lucca Allen |
