= 2019 F3 Asian Championship =

Motor racing competition

The 2019 F3 Asian Championship was a multi-event, Formula 3 open-wheel single seater motor racing championship held across Asia. The championship featured a mix of professional and amateur drivers, competing in Formula 3 cars that conform to the FIA Formula 3 regulations for the championship. It was the second season of the championship.

The season commenced on 6 April at Sepang International Circuit and concluded on 29 September at Shanghai International Circuit, after fifteen races held at five meetings.

In 2019 the F3 Asian Championship hosted a Winter Series to give existing and new drivers from around the world an opportunity to prepare for the new season. The inaugural season of the Winter Series consisted of three rounds with nine total races, beginning on 11 January at Chang International Circuit and ending on 24 February after two more rounds at Sepang International Circuit.

== Summer series ==
=== Teams and drivers ===
Team	No.	Drivers	Status	Rounds
(United Kingdom) Hitech Grand Prix	1	(Japan) Ukyo Sasahara		All
(United Kingdom) Hitech Grand Prix	2	(United Kingdom) Jack Doohan (Note: Doohan is an Australian driver racing under a British license in the main series season.)		All
(United Kingdom) Hitech Grand Prix	17	(Australia) Jackson Walls		3–5
(Republic of Ireland) Pinnacle Motorsport	3	(Republic of Ireland) Jordan Dempsey		1, 3–5
(Republic of Ireland) Pinnacle Motorsport	12	(United Kingdom) Ayrton Simmons		2, 4
(Republic of Ireland) Pinnacle Motorsport	16	(Australia) Tommy Smith		All
(China) Zen Motorsport	4	(China) James Yu		All
(China) Absolute Racing	5	(China) Daniel Cao		All
(China) Absolute Racing	15	(Sri Lanka) Eshan Pieris		All
(Japan) Super License	7	(Japan) Tomoki Takahashi		1, 3
(Japan) Super License	8	(Japan) Yu Kanamaru		1–2, 4
(Japan) Super License	8	(Japan) Takashi Hata	**M**	3
(Hong Kong) BlackArts Racing Team	9	(Hong Kong) Thomas Lüdi (Note: Luedi is a Swiss driver racing under a license from Hong Kong.)	**M**	All
(Hong Kong) BlackArts Racing Team	86	(New Zealand) Brendon Leitch		All
(Hong Kong) BlackArts Racing Team	95	(Czech Republic) Tom Beckhäuser		1–2
(Hong Kong) BlackArts Racing Team	95	(Japan) Miki Koyama		3
(Japan) B-Max Racing Team	28	(Japan) Tairoku Yamaguchi	**M**	1
(Japan) B-Max Racing Team	30	(Japan) "Dragon"	**M**	1
(Japan) B-Max Racing Team	30	(Japan) Kiyoto Fujinami		3
(Japan) B-Max Racing Team	85	(Japan) Miki Koyama		2
(India) M-Sport Asia	33	(India) Akash Gowda		1–3, 5
(Hong Kong) 852 Challengers	44	(Hong Kong) Paul Wong	**M**	All
(Mexico) Seven GP	21	(Czech Republic) Petr Ptáček		3
(Mexico) Seven GP	77	(United Kingdom) Jamie Chadwick		1

Icon	Status
**M**	Master

=== Race calendar ===
The second season of the series will be contested in four countries.

Round		Circuit	Date	Pole Position	Fastest lap	Winning driver	Winning team	Supporting
1	R1	(Malaysia) Sepang International Circuit	6 April	(China) Daniel Cao	(Japan) Ukyo Sasahara	(Japan) Ukyo Sasahara	(United Kingdom) Hitech Grand Prix	Malaysia Championship Series; Blancpain GT World Challenge Asia; TCR Asia Series; Formula 4 South East Asia Championship
1	R2	(Malaysia) Sepang International Circuit	6 April		(Japan) Ukyo Sasahara	(Japan) Ukyo Sasahara	(United Kingdom) Hitech Grand Prix	Malaysia Championship Series; Blancpain GT World Challenge Asia; TCR Asia Series; Formula 4 South East Asia Championship
1	R3	(Malaysia) Sepang International Circuit	7 April	(United Kingdom) Jack Doohan	(United Kingdom) Jack Doohan	(United Kingdom) Jack Doohan	(United Kingdom) Hitech Grand Prix	Malaysia Championship Series; Blancpain GT World Challenge Asia; TCR Asia Series; Formula 4 South East Asia Championship
2	R1	(Thailand) Chang International Circuit	11 May	(Japan) Ukyo Sasahara	(Japan) Ukyo Sasahara	(Japan) Ukyo Sasahara	(United Kingdom) Hitech Grand Prix	Blancpain GT World Challenge Asia; Formula 4 South East Asia Championship
2	R2	(Thailand) Chang International Circuit	12 May		(United Kingdom) Jack Doohan	(United Kingdom) Jack Doohan	(United Kingdom) Hitech Grand Prix	Blancpain GT World Challenge Asia; Formula 4 South East Asia Championship
2	R3	(Thailand) Chang International Circuit	12 May	(Japan) Ukyo Sasahara	(New Zealand) Brendon Leitch	(Japan) Ukyo Sasahara	(United Kingdom) Hitech Grand Prix	Blancpain GT World Challenge Asia; Formula 4 South East Asia Championship
3	R1	(Japan) Suzuka Circuit	22 June	(Japan) Ukyo Sasahara	(United Kingdom) Jack Doohan	(United Kingdom) Jack Doohan	(United Kingdom) Hitech Grand Prix	Blancpain GT World Challenge Asia
3	R2	(Japan) Suzuka Circuit	23 June		(United Kingdom) Jack Doohan	(Japan) Ukyo Sasahara	(United Kingdom) Hitech Grand Prix	Blancpain GT World Challenge Asia
3	R3	(Japan) Suzuka Circuit	23 June	(Czech Republic) Petr Ptáček	(Japan) Ukyo Sasahara	(United Kingdom) Jack Doohan	(United Kingdom) Hitech Grand Prix	Blancpain GT World Challenge Asia
4	R1	(China) Shanghai International Circuit	7 September	(Japan) Ukyo Sasahara	(Japan) Ukyo Sasahara	(Japan) Ukyo Sasahara	(United Kingdom) Hitech Grand Prix	China Formula 4 Championship; China Formula Grand Prix
4	R2	(China) Shanghai International Circuit	8 September		(Japan) Ukyo Sasahara	(Japan) Ukyo Sasahara	(United Kingdom) Hitech Grand Prix	China Formula 4 Championship; China Formula Grand Prix
4	R3	(China) Shanghai International Circuit	8 September	(Japan) Ukyo Sasahara	(Japan) Ukyo Sasahara	(Japan) Ukyo Sasahara	(United Kingdom) Hitech Grand Prix	China Formula 4 Championship; China Formula Grand Prix
5	R1	(China) Shanghai International Circuit	27 September	(Japan) Ukyo Sasahara	(China) Daniel Cao	(China) Daniel Cao	(China) Absolute Racing	Blancpain GT World Challenge Asia; China Formula 4 Championship; China Formula Grand Prix
5	R2	(China) Shanghai International Circuit	28 September		(China) Daniel Cao	(China) Daniel Cao	(China) Absolute Racing	Blancpain GT World Challenge Asia; China Formula 4 Championship; China Formula Grand Prix
5	R3	(China) Shanghai International Circuit	28 September	(Japan) Ukyo Sasahara	(United Kingdom) Jack Doohan	(United Kingdom) Jack Doohan	(United Kingdom) Hitech Grand Prix	Blancpain GT World Challenge Asia; China Formula 4 Championship; China Formula Grand Prix

=== Championship standings ===
==== Scoring system ====
Points are awarded to the top ten drivers.

Position	**1st**	**2nd**	**3rd**	**4th**	**5th**	**6th**	**7th**	**8th**	**9th**	**10th**
Points	25	18	15	12	10	8	6	4	2	1

==== Drivers' Championship ====
Pos	Driver	SEP (Malaysia)			CHA (Thailand)			SUZ (Japan)			SIC1 (China)			SIC2 (China)			Pts
Pos	Driver	R1	R2	R3	R1	R2	R3	R1	R2	R3	R1	R2	R3	R1	R2	R3	Pts
1	(Japan) Ukyo Sasahara	1	1	2	**1**	2	**1**	**2**	1	9	**1**	1	**1**	**3**	4	**2**	301
2	(United Kingdom) Jack Doohan	2	2	**1**	2	1	2	1	10	1	4	3	2	2	3	1	276
3	(China) Daniel Cao	**3**	4	7	3	3	9	4	2	Ret	2	2	Ret	1	1	7	187
4	(New Zealand) Brendon Leitch	4	3	4	5	Ret	3	5	Ret	2	3	5	8	10	2	4	152
5	(Sri Lanka) Eshan Pieris	5	5	6	4	4	4	9	6	4	7	7	5	7	10	5	125
6	(Australia) Jackson Walls							7	3	5	6	6	7	4	5	3	90
7	(Republic of Ireland) Jordan Dempsey	10	9	9				6	Ret	3	5	8	3	5	6	6	83
8	(China) James Yu	11	11	11	10	6	5	10	8	6	8	11	9	6	7	9	54
9	(Japan) Yu Kanamaru	8	6	8	7	9	7				Ret	4	6				50
10	(United Kingdom) Ayrton Simmons				6	5	6				Ret	9	4				40
11	(Czech Republic) Petr Ptáček							3	4	**Ret**							27
12	(Japan) Tomoki Takahashi	7	7	3				Ret	13†	Ret							27
13	(India) Akash Gowda	9	8	12	8	10	12	11	9	8				8	8	10	26
14	(United Kingdom) Jamie Chadwick	6	12	5													18
15	(Japan) Miki Koyama				9	8	11	12	7	7							18
16	(Japan) Kiyoto Fujinami							8	5	Ret							14
17	(Czech Republic) Tom Beckhäuser	Ret	10	10	11	7	8										12
18	(Australia) Tommy Smith	12	13	13	Ret	DNS	10	15	Ret	Ret	9	10	10	Ret	9	8	11
19	(Hong Kong) Paul Wong	14	16	16	12	11	14	14	11	11	10	13	12	9	11	11	3
20	(Hong Kong) Thomas Lüdi	Ret	Ret	15	Ret	Ret	13	13	12	10	Ret	12	11	Ret	Ret	Ret	1
21	(Japan) "Dragon"	13	14	17													0
22	(Japan) Tairoku Yamaguchi	Ret	15	14													0
–	(Japan) Takashi Hata							Ret	DNS	DNS							–
Pos	Driver	R1	R2	R3	R1	R2	R3	R1	R2	R3	R1	R2	R3	R1	R2	R3	Pts
Pos	Driver	SEP (Malaysia)			CHA (Thailand)			SUZ (Japan)			SIC1 (China)			SIC2 (China)			Pts

Colour	Result
Gold	Winner
Silver	Second place
Bronze	Third place
Green	Points classification
Blue	Non-points classification
Blue	Non-classified finish (NC)
Purple	Retired, not classified (Ret)
Red	Did not qualify (DNQ)
Red	Did not pre-qualify (DNPQ)
Black	Disqualified (DSQ)
White	Did not start (DNS)
White	Withdrew (WD)
White	Race cancelled (C)
Blank	Did not practice (DNP)
Blank	Did not arrive (DNA)
Blank	Excluded (EX)

**Bold** – Pole
Italics – Fastest Lap

Notes:

- † — Drivers did not finish the race, but were classified as they completed over 75% of the race distance.

==== Masters Cup ====
Pos	Driver	SEP (Malaysia)			CHA (Thailand)			SUZ (Japan)			SIC1 (China)			SIC2 (China)			Pts
Pos	Driver	R1	R2	R3	R1	R2	R3	R1	R2	R3	R1	R2	R3	R1	R2	R3	Pts
1	(Hong Kong) Paul Wong	14	16	16	12	11	14	14	11	11	10	13	12	9	11	11	313
2	(Hong Kong) Thomas Lüdi	Ret	Ret	15	Ret	Ret	13	13	12	10	Ret	12	11	Ret	Ret	Ret	161
3	(Japan) "Dragon"	13	14	17													62
4	(Japan) Tairoku Yamaguchi	Ret	15	14													43
–	(Japan) Takashi Hata							Ret	DNS	DNS							–
Pos	Driver	R1	R2	R3	R1	R2	R3	R1	R2	R3	R1	R2	R3	R1	R2	R3	Pts
Pos	Driver	SEP (Malaysia)			CHA (Thailand)			SUZ (Japan)			SIC1 (China)			SIC2 (China)			Pts

==== Teams Championship ====
Pos	Team	Pts
1	(United Kingdom) Hitech Grand Prix	599
2	(China) Absolute Racing	310
3	(Hong Kong) BlackArts Racing	176
4	(Republic of Ireland) Pinnacle Motorsport	132
5	(Japan) Super License	75
6	(China) Zen Motorsport	54
7	(Mexico) Seven GP	45
8	(India) M-Sport Asia	26
9	(Japan) B-Max Racing Team	20
10	(Hong Kong) 852 Challengers	3

Notes:

- † — Drivers did not finish the race, but were classified as they completed over 75% of the race distance.

== Winter series ==
=== Teams and drivers ===
Team	No.	Drivers	Status	Rounds
(United Kingdom) Dragon Hitech GP	1	(France) Alessandro Ghiretti		All
(United Kingdom) Dragon Hitech GP	2	(United Kingdom) Pavan Ravishankar (Note: Ravishankar is a driver from Singapore racing under a British racing license.)		All
(United Kingdom) Dragon Hitech GP	17	(United Kingdom) Max Fewtrell		2
(United Kingdom) Dragon Hitech GP	17	(Australia) Jack Doohan	G	3
(United Kingdom) Dragon Hitech GP	21	(Netherlands) Rinus VeeKay		All
(United Kingdom) Dragon Hitech GP	27	(United Kingdom) Dan Ticktum		1–2
(Hong Kong) BlackArts Racing Team	7	(Hungary) Vivien Keszthelyi		All
(Hong Kong) BlackArts Racing Team	23	(Netherlands) Joey Alders	G	3
(Hong Kong) BlackArts Racing Team	38	(Macau) Charles Leong		3
(Republic of Ireland) Pinnacle Motorsport	11	(France) Victor Martins	G	3
(Republic of Ireland) Pinnacle Motorsport	29	(Malaysia) Akash Nandy		All
(Republic of Ireland) Pinnacle Motorsport	31	(Denmark) Christian Lundgaard	G	3
(Republic of Ireland) Pinnacle Motorsport	65	(Germany) David Schumacher		1–2
(Republic of Ireland) Pinnacle Motorsport	88	(Belgium) Amaury Cordeel		1–2
(Japan) B-Max Racing Team	13	(Japan) Motoyoshi Yoshida	M	2–3
(Japan) B-Max Racing Team	28	(Japan) Tairoku Yamaguchi	M	All
(Japan) B-Max Racing Team	30	(Japan) "Dragon"	M	1–2
(Japan) B-Max Racing Team	85	(Japan) Miki Koyama	G	3
(China) Absolute Racing	15	(Sri Lanka) Eshan Pieris		All
(China) Absolute Racing	16	(China) Yifei Ye (Note: Ye is a Chinese driver racing under a French racing license.)		All
(Japan) Super License	81	(Japan) Tomoki Takahashi		All

Icon	Status
**M**	Master
**G**	Guest

=== Race calendar ===
Round		Circuit	Date	Pole Position	Fastest lap	Winning driver	Winning team	Supporting
1	R1	(Thailand) Chang International Circuit	11 January	(United Kingdom) Dan Ticktum	(Netherlands) Rinus VeeKay	(Netherlands) Rinus VeeKay	(United Kingdom) Dragon Hitech GP	Asian Le Mans Series
1	R2	(Thailand) Chang International Circuit	12 January		(Netherlands) Rinus VeeKay	(Netherlands) Rinus VeeKay	(United Kingdom) Dragon Hitech GP	Asian Le Mans Series
1	R3	(Thailand) Chang International Circuit	12 January	(United Kingdom) Dan Ticktum	(China) Yifei Ye	(China) Yifei Ye	(China) Absolute Racing	Asian Le Mans Series
2	R1	(Malaysia) Sepang International Circuit	19 January	(Netherlands) Rinus VeeKay	(Netherlands) Rinus VeeKay	(Netherlands) Rinus VeeKay	(United Kingdom) Dragon Hitech GP	TCR Malaysia Touring Car Championship; GT Masters Asia
2	R2	(Malaysia) Sepang International Circuit	20 January		(Netherlands) Rinus VeeKay	(Netherlands) Rinus VeeKay	(United Kingdom) Dragon Hitech GP	TCR Malaysia Touring Car Championship; GT Masters Asia
2	R3	(Malaysia) Sepang International Circuit	20 January	(Netherlands) Rinus VeeKay	(China) Yifei Ye	(China) Yifei Ye	(China) Absolute Racing	TCR Malaysia Touring Car Championship; GT Masters Asia
3	R1	(Malaysia) Sepang International Circuit	23 February	(China) Yifei Ye	(China) Yifei Ye	(China) Yifei Ye	(China) Absolute Racing	Asian Le Mans Series; TCR Malaysia Touring Car Championship
3	R2	(Malaysia) Sepang International Circuit	23 February		(China) Yifei Ye	(China) Yifei Ye	(China) Absolute Racing	Asian Le Mans Series; TCR Malaysia Touring Car Championship
3	R3	(Malaysia) Sepang International Circuit	24 February	(China) Yifei Ye	(China) Yifei Ye	(Sri Lanka) Eshan Pieris	(China) Absolute Racing	Asian Le Mans Series; TCR Malaysia Touring Car Championship

=== Championship standings ===
==== Scoring system ====
Points are awarded to the top ten drivers.

Position	**1st**	**2nd**	**3rd**	**4th**	**5th**	**6th**	**7th**	**8th**	**9th**	**10th**
Points	25	18	15	12	10	8	6	4	2	1

==== Drivers' Championship ====
Pos	Driver	CHA (Thailand)			SEP1 (Malaysia)			SEP2 (Malaysia)			Pts
Pos	Driver	R1	R2	R3	R1	R2	R3	R1	R2	R3	Pts
1	(Netherlands) Rinus VeeKay	1	1	3	**1**	1	**2**	6	3	3	184
2	(China) Yifei Ye	Ret	2	1	2	2	1	**1**	1	**13†**	155
3	(France) Alessandro Ghiretti	2	5	Ret	3	3	3	12	6	4	106
4	(Japan) Tomoki Takahashi	Ret	7	6	4	4	7	4	10	6	80
5	(United Kingdom) Pavan Ravishankar	3	4	8	8	8	8	7	11	5	73
6	(Sri Lanka) Eshan Pieris	5	DNS	Ret	6	10	6	Ret	5	1	67
7	(Malaysia) Akash Nandy	4	8	7	5	9	5	Ret	7	7	62
8	(Germany) David Schumacher	7	3	5	7	7	Ret				43
9	(United Kingdom) Dan Ticktum	**Ret**	6	**2**	DNS	5	9				38
10	(Belgium) Amaury Cordeel	6	9	4	DNS	Ret	11				22
11	(United Kingdom) Max Fewtrell				Ret	6	4				20
12	(Macau) Charles Leong							9	12	8	20
13	(Hungary) Vivien Keszthelyi	8	11	9	9	11	10	Ret	16	10	13
14	(Japan) Motoyoshi Yoshida				12	13	14	11	15	12	11
15	(Japan) Tairoku Yamaguchi	9	10	10	10	Ret	13	Ret	13	Ret	7
16	(Japan) "Dragon"	DNS	DNS	DNS	11	12	12				0
guest drivers ineligible to score points
—	(Australia) Jack Doohan							2	2	14†	—
—	(France) Victor Martins							3	4	2	—
—	(Denmark) Christian Lundgaard							5	8	Ret	—
—	(Netherlands) Joey Alders							8	9	9	—
—	(Japan) Miki Koyama							10	14	11	—
Pos	Driver	R1	R2	R3	R1	R2	R3	R1	R2	R3	Pts
Pos	Driver	CHA (Thailand)			SEP1 (Malaysia)			SEP2 (Malaysia)			Pts

Colour	Result
Gold	Winner
Silver	Second place
Bronze	Third place
Green	Points classification
Blue	Non-points classification
Blue	Non-classified finish (NC)
Purple	Retired, not classified (Ret)
Red	Did not qualify (DNQ)
Red	Did not pre-qualify (DNPQ)
Black	Disqualified (DSQ)
White	Did not start (DNS)
White	Withdrew (WD)
White	Race cancelled (C)
Blank	Did not practice (DNP)
Blank	Did not arrive (DNA)
Blank	Excluded (EX)

**Bold** – Pole
Italics – Fastest Lap

==== Masters Cup ====
Pos	Driver	CHA (Thailand)			SEP1 (Malaysia)			SEP2 (Malaysia)			Pts
Pos	Driver	R1	R2	R3	R1	R2	R3	R1	R2	R3	Pts
1	(Japan) Tairoku Yamaguchi	9	10	10	10	Ret	13	Ret	13	Ret	143
2	(Japan) Motoyoshi Yoshida				12	13	14	11	15	12	116
3	(Japan) "Dragon"	DNS	DNS	DNS	11	12	12				68
Pos	Driver	R1	R2	R3	R1	R2	R3	R1	R2	R3	Pts
Pos	Driver	CHA (Thailand)			SEP1 (Malaysia)			SEP2 (Malaysia)			Pts

==== Teams Championship ====
Pos	Team	Pts
1	(United Kingdom) Hitech Grand Prix	316
2	(China) Absolute Racing	222
3	(Republic of Ireland) Pinnacle Motorsport	113
4	(Japan) Super License	44
5	(Hong Kong) BlackArts Racing	29
6	(Japan) B-Max Racing Team	18

Notes:

- † — Drivers did not finish the race, but were classified as they completed over 75% of the race distance.
