= Eshan Pieris =

Sri Lankan racing driver (born 1998)

- Nationality: (Sri Lanka) Sri Lankan
- Born: 24 June 1998 (age 28) Colombo, Sri Lanka

GTWC Europe Sprint Cup career
- Debut season: 2025
- Current team: Rutronik Racing
- Categorisation: FIA Silver
- Car number: 97
- Starts: 4 (4 entries)
- Wins: 0
- Podiums: 0
- Poles: 0
- Fastest laps: 0

Previous series
- 2023–24 2019 2019 2018 2017–18: GT World Challenge Asia; F3 Asian Winter Series; F3 Asian Championship; Asian Formula Renault Series; F4 South East Asia Championship

Eshan Pieris (born 24 June 1998) is a Sri Lankan racing driver who last competed in the 2025 GT World Challenge Europe Sprint Cup for Rutronik Racing. He previously competed in the 2024 GT World Challenge Asia for Absolute Racing.

== Junior career ==
=== Formula 4 South East Asia Championship ===
In 2017, Pieris made his car racing debut in the 2017–18 Formula 4 South East Asia Championship driving at rounds 1 and 4 for Meritus.GP. In the first race of the season at Sepang International Circuit, Pieris finished on the podium in third. During his return to the series in round 4 at Sepang, he won his first race of the season in race two.

=== Asian Formula Renault Series ===
For 2018, Pieris switched over to the Asian Formula Renault Series for the 2018 season, driving for Eurasia Motorsport. He marked his best result of third in the final race at Sepang and finished ninth in the standings.

=== F3 Asian Championship ===
Pieris continued his open-wheel racing career and signed with Absolute Racing to compete in the 2019 F3 Asian Championship. He had a consistent season, finishing in the top-ten in every race. Pieris finished fifth in the championship.

Later in the year, Pieris was confirmed as an entry for the 2019 F3 Asian Winter Series, once again driving for Absolute Racing. He displayed consistency across the season and won the final race of the season at Sepang, finishing ahead of Victor Martins and champion Rinus Veekay.

== Sportscar racing career ==
=== GT World Challenge Asia ===
==== 2023 ====
Following a three year hiatus, Pieris returned to racing, making a switch to sportscar racing. He signed with B-Quik Racing to compete in the 2023 GT World Challenge Asia - Pro-Am Cup, alongside Henk Kiks. For the final round of the season, Pieris switched to the No. 62 car to compete in the Silver Cup alongside Akash Nandy.

==== 2024 ====
Pieris returned for a full-time campaign in the series for the 2024 season with Absolute Racing. He competed in the silver cup, driving the No. 911 Porsche 911 GT3 R (992) alongside Tanart Sathienthirakul. The pair had a successful season in the Silver Cup, with three wins and eight podiums. They contended for the Silver Cup title with the No. 36 FAW Audi Sport Asia Racing Team but came up short, finishing 19 points behind in second.

=== GT World Challenge Europe ===
==== 2025 ====
Following his success in the GT World Challenge Asia, Pieris moved over to Europe to compete in the 2025 GT World Challenge Europe Sprint Cup driving the No. 97 Porsche 911 GT3 R (992) for Rutronik Racing. He drove alongside 2024 Porsche Carrera Cup North America champion Loek Hartog.

== Karting record ==
=== Karting career summary ===
Season	Series	Team	Position
2018	Rotax Max Challenge Grand Finals – DD2	KMS Europe KFT	26th
2019	IAME Series Asia – Senior	RL Karting	41st
2019	Rotax Max Challenge Grand Finals – DD2	RL Karting	49th

== Racing record ==
=== Racing career summary ===
Season	Series	Team	Races	Wins	Poles	F/Laps	Podiums	Points	Position
2017-18	Formula 4 South East Asia Championship	Meritus.GP	10	1	2	1	2	88	12th
2018	Asian Formula Renault Series	Eurasia Motorsport	10	0	0	0	1	68	9th
2019	F3 Asian Championship	Absolute Racing	15	0	0	0	0	125	5th
2019	F3 Asian Winter Series	Absolute Racing	8	1	0	0	1	67	6th
2023	GT World Challenge Asia - GT3	B-Quik Racing	2	0	0	0	0	0	NC
2023	GT World Challenge Asia - GT3	B-Quik Absolute Racing	2	0	0	0	0	0	NC
2024	GT World Challenge Asia	Absolute Racing	12	0	0	0	0	30	22nd
2025	GT World Challenge Europe Sprint Cup	Rutronik Racing	10	0	0	0	0	0	NC
2025	GT World Challenge Europe Sprint Cup - Silver	Rutronik Racing	10	0	0	1	0	42	9th
2025	GT World Challenge Europe Endurance Cup	Dinamic GT	1	0	0	0	0	0	NC
2025-26	24H Series Middle East - GT3	Dinamic GT							

* Season still in progress

=== Complete Formula 4 South East Asia Championship results ===
(key) (Races in bold indicate pole position) (Races in italics indicate fastest lap)

Year	Team	1	2	3	4	5	6	7	8	9	10	11	12	13	14	15	16	17	18	19	20	21	22	23	24	25	26	27	28	29	30	Pos	Points
2017–18	Meritus.GP	SEP1; 1; 3	SEP1; 2; 6	SEP1; 3; 5	SEP1; 4; 6	SEP1; 5; 5	SEP1; 6 C	CLA; 1	CLA; 2	CLA; 3	CLA; 4	CLA; 5	CLA; 6	CHA; 1	CHA; 2	CHA; 3	CHA; 4	CHA; 5	CHA; 6	SEP2; 1; 8	SEP2; 2; 1	SEP2; 3 Ret	SEP2; 4 DNS	SEP2; 5; 8	SEP2; 6 Ret	SEP3; 1	SEP3; 2	SEP3; 3	SEP3; 4	SEP3; 5	SEP3; 6	12th	88

=== Complete F3 Asian Championship results ===
(key) (Races in bold indicate pole position) (Races in italics indicate fastest lap)

Year	Team	1	2	3	4	5	6	7	8	9	10	11	12	13	14	15	DC	Points
2019	Absolute Racing	SEP; 1; 5	SEP; 2; 5	SEP; 3; 6	CHA; 1; 4	CHA; 2; 4	CHA; 3; 4	SUZ; 1; 9	SUZ; 2; 6	SUZ; 3; 4	SIC1; 1; 7	SIC1; 2; 7	SIC1; 3; 5	SIC2; 1; 7	SIC2; 2; 10	SIC2; 3; 5	5th	125

=== Complete F3 Asian Winter Series results ===
(key) (Races in bold indicate pole position) (Races in italics indicate fastest lap)

Year	Team	1	2	3	4	5	6	7	8	9	DC	Points
2019	Absolute Racing	CHA; 1; 5	CHA; 2 DNS	CHA; 3 Ret	SEP1; 1; 6	SEP1; 2; 10	SEP1; 3; 6	SEP2; 1 Ret	SEP2; 2; 5	SEP2; 3; 1	6th	67

=== Complete GT World Challenge Asia results ===
(key) (Races in bold indicate pole position) (Races in italics indicate fastest lap)

Year	Team	Car	Class	1	2	3	4	5	6	7	8	9	10	11	12	DC	Points
2024	Absolute Racing	Porsche 911 GT3 R (992)	Silver	SEP; 1; 4	SEP; 2; 4	BUR; 1; 3	BUR; 2; 1	FUJ; 1; 1	FUJ; 2; 3	SUZ; 1; 1	SUZ; 2; 3	OKA; 1; 4	OKA; 2; 2	SIC; 1; 4	SIC; 2; 3	2nd	201

=== GT World Challenge Europe Sprint Cup ===
(key) (Races in bold indicate pole position) (Races in italics indicate fastest lap)

Year	Team	Car	Class	1	2	3	4	5	6	7	8	9	10	Pos.	Points
2025	Rutronik Racing	Porsche 911 GT3 R (992)	Silver	BRH; 1; 15	BRH; 2 Ret	ZAN; 1; 16	ZAN; 2; 28	MIS; 1; 23	MIS; 2; 41	MAG; 1; 20	MAG; 2; 20	VAL; 1; 26	VAL; 2; 11	9th	42
