= 2017–18 Formula 4 South East Asia Championship =

Motor racing competition

Seasons
- ← 2016–17 2018 →

The 2017–18 Formula 4 South East Asia Championship season was the second season of the Formula 4 South East Asia Championship. It began on 30 September 2017 at the Sepang International Circuit and finished on 15 April 2018 at the same venue, after 29 races held across five rounds on three countries.

== Drivers ==
| | Driver | Rounds |
|---|---|---|
| 1 | (Japan) Hibiki Taira | 4–5 |
| 3 | (Thailand) Kane Shepherd | All |
| 9 | (Thailand) Shivin Sirinarinthon | 1–2 |
| 10 | (Malaysia) Timothy Yeo | 5 |
| 15 | (Malaysia) Timothy Yeo | 2 |
| 16 | (Taiwan) Benson Lin | 4 |
| 17 | (Malaysia) Nazim Azman | 1, 3, 5 |
| 19 | (Philippines) Ben Grimes | 2–3 |
| 19 | (Malaysia) Isyraf Danish | 1 |
| 77 | (Malaysia) Isyraf Danish | 5 |
| 22 | (Malaysia) Alister Yoong | 4 |
| 23 | (Malaysia) Muizz Musyaffa | 4–5 |
| 27 | (Belgium) Ugo de Wilde | 3–4 |
| 28 | (France) Alessandro Ghiretti | 5 |
| 29 | (Malaysia) Mitchell Cheah | 4 |
| 30 | (Sri Lanka) Eshan Pieris | 1, 4 |
| 31 | (Malaysia) Armand Johany | 5 |
| 32 | (Indonesia) Presley Martono | 5 |
| 33 | (Philippines) Sam Grimes | 2–3 |
| 38 | (Malaysia) Arsh Johany | 5 |
| 42 | (Republic of Ireland) Luke Thompson | All |
| 45 | (Thailand) Sasakorn Chaimongkol | 3 |
| 55 | (China) Daniel Cao | All |
| 66 | (Singapore) Danial Frost | 1 |
| 72 | (India) Nayan Chatterjee | 1 |
| 78 | (Australia) Aaron Love | 4 |
| 88 | (Indonesia) Perdana Putra Minang | 1 |
| 93 | (Malaysia) Adam Khalid | 2 |
| 95 | (Malaysia) Adam Khalid | 4 |
| 99 | (Sri Lanka) Liam Lawrence | 4 |

== Race calendar and results ==
The final calendar was released on 4 July 2017. The first round at Sepang will be held in support the 2017 Malaysian Grand Prix, whereas the two final rounds in Buriram and Sepang will support the 2017–18 Asian Le Mans Series.

Due to an incident involving F1 driver Romain Grosjean, which required track fixing operations, the first race of the opening Sepang round had to be postponed. It was announced later that the round will be shortened to 5 races, with the sixth race being rescheduled at a later date.

On November 20, organizers cancelled round 3 at the Sentul International Circuit in Indonesia due lo logistical complications. It was later announced that the round would be rescheduled at Buriram for early December, and finally at Sepang for mid April as the season finale.

| Round | | Circuit | Date | Pole position | Fastest lap | Winning driver | Supporting |
2017
| 1 | R1 | (Malaysia) Sepang International Circuit, Selangor | 30 September | (Singapore) Danial Frost | (China) Daniel Cao | (China) Daniel Cao | Malaysian Grand Prix |
| 1 | R2 | (Malaysia) Sepang International Circuit, Selangor | 30 September | | (China) Daniel Cao | (China) Daniel Cao | Malaysian Grand Prix |
| 1 | R3 | (Malaysia) Sepang International Circuit, Selangor | 30 September | (Singapore) Danial Frost | (India) Nayan Chatterjee | (Singapore) Danial Frost | Malaysian Grand Prix |
| 1 | R4 | (Malaysia) Sepang International Circuit, Selangor | 1 October | | (India) Nayan Chatterjee | (China) Daniel Cao | Malaysian Grand Prix |
| 1 | R5 | (Malaysia) Sepang International Circuit, Selangor | 1 October | | (China) Daniel Cao | (Malaysia) Nazim Azman | Malaysian Grand Prix |
| 1 | R6 | (Malaysia) Sepang International Circuit, Selangor | 1 October | Race cancelled due to track repairs | | | Malaysian Grand Prix |
| 2 | R1 | (Philippines) Clark International Speedway, Mabalacat | 21 October | (Philippines) Ben Grimes | (Philippines) Ben Grimes | (Philippines) Ben Grimes | |
| 2 | R2 | (Philippines) Clark International Speedway, Mabalacat | 21 October | | | (China) Daniel Cao | |
| 2 | R3 | (Philippines) Clark International Speedway, Mabalacat | 22 October | | (China) Daniel Cao | (China) Daniel Cao | |
| 2 | R4 | (Philippines) Clark International Speedway, Mabalacat | 22 October | (China) Daniel Cao | (Philippines) Ben Grimes | (China) Daniel Cao | |
| 2 | R5 | (Philippines) Clark International Speedway, Mabalacat | 22 October | | (Philippines) Ben Grimes | (Philippines) Ben Grimes | |
| 2 | R6 | (Philippines) Clark International Speedway, Mabalacat | 22 October | | (China) Daniel Cao | (China) Daniel Cao | |
2018
| 3 | R1 | (Thailand) Chang International Circuit, Buriram | 12 January | (Belgium) Ugo de Wilde | (Belgium) Ugo de Wilde | (China) Daniel Cao | Asian Le Mans Series |
| 3 | R2 | (Thailand) Chang International Circuit, Buriram | 12 January | | (Belgium) Ugo de Wilde | (Belgium) Ugo de Wilde | Asian Le Mans Series |
| 3 | R3 | (Thailand) Chang International Circuit, Buriram | 12 January | | (Malaysia) Nazim Azman | (Belgium) Ugo de Wilde | Asian Le Mans Series |
| 3 | R4 | (Thailand) Chang International Circuit, Buriram | 12 January | (Belgium) Ugo de Wilde | (Thailand) Kane Shepherd | (Belgium) Ugo de Wilde | Asian Le Mans Series |
| 3 | R5 | (Thailand) Chang International Circuit, Buriram | 13 January | | (Belgium) Ugo de Wilde | (Belgium) Ugo de Wilde | Asian Le Mans Series |
| 3 | R6 | (Thailand) Chang International Circuit, Buriram | 13 January | | (Malaysia) Nazim Azman | (Malaysia) Nazim Azman | Asian Le Mans Series |
| 4 | R1 | (Malaysia) Sepang International Circuit, Selangor | 3 February | (Sri Lanka) Eshan Pieris | (China) Daniel Cao | (China) Daniel Cao | Asian Le Mans Series |
| 4 | R2 | (Malaysia) Sepang International Circuit, Selangor | 3 February | | (Sri Lanka) Eshan Pieris | (Sri Lanka) Eshan Pieris | Asian Le Mans Series |
| 4 | R3 | (Malaysia) Sepang International Circuit, Selangor | 3 February | | (Thailand) Kane Shepherd | (Malaysia) Mitchell Cheah | Asian Le Mans Series |
| 4 | R4 | (Malaysia) Sepang International Circuit, Selangor | 4 February | (Sri Lanka) Eshan Pieris | (Belgium) Ugo de Wilde | (Thailand) Kane Shepherd | Asian Le Mans Series |
| 4 | R5 | (Malaysia) Sepang International Circuit, Selangor | 4 February | | (Thailand) Kane Shepherd | (Belgium) Ugo de Wilde | Asian Le Mans Series |
| 4 | R6 | (Malaysia) Sepang International Circuit, Selangor | 4 February | | (Japan) Hibiki Taira | (Thailand) Kane Shepherd | Asian Le Mans Series |
| 5 | R1 | (Malaysia) Sepang International Circuit, Selangor | 13 April | (China) Daniel Cao | (China) Daniel Cao | (Thailand) Kane Shepherd | Blancpain GT Series Asia; Malaysia Championship Series |
| 5 | R2 | (Malaysia) Sepang International Circuit, Selangor | 14 April | | (China) Daniel Cao | (China) Daniel Cao | Blancpain GT Series Asia; Malaysia Championship Series |
| 5 | R3 | (Malaysia) Sepang International Circuit, Selangor | 14 April | | (Malaysia) Nazim Azman | (Thailand) Kane Shepherd | Blancpain GT Series Asia; Malaysia Championship Series |
| 5 | R4 | (Malaysia) Sepang International Circuit, Selangor | 15 April | (Malaysia) Muizz Musyaffa | (Japan) Hibiki Taira | (France) Alessandro Ghiretti | Blancpain GT Series Asia; Malaysia Championship Series |
| 5 | R5 | (Malaysia) Sepang International Circuit, Selangor | 15 April | | (Indonesia) Presley Martono | (Indonesia) Presley Martono | Blancpain GT Series Asia; Malaysia Championship Series |
| 5 | R6 | (Malaysia) Sepang International Circuit, Selangor | 15 April | | (Thailand) Kane Shepherd | (Malaysia) Muizz Musyaffa | Blancpain GT Series Asia; Malaysia Championship Series |

== Championship standings ==
The series follows the standard F1 points scoring system with the addition of 1 point for fastest lap and 3 points for pole. The best 24 results out of 30 races counted towards the championship.

The first and second fastest qualifying laps determine grid positions for race 1 and race 4 (In the opening round at Sepang for race 3 instead of race 4 due to cancelling of the race). The fastest laps in race 1 determine the grid positions for race 2, while the grid positions for race 3 are created by the finishing positions of race 2 with top half of the grid reversed. race 4 grid positions based on the drivers’ second fastest qualifying laps, while race 5 start is determined by the fastest laps of race 4 and the grid positions of race 6 are the finishing positions of race 5, with the top half of the grid reversed.

Due to miscalculation of the fuel level, no cars were able to finish full race distance of the third race in the opening round of the season at Sepang because of lack of petrol. The classification was declared after five race laps.

Points were awarded as follows:

| Position | **1st** | **2nd** | **3rd** | **4th** | **5th** | **6th** | **7th** | **8th** | **9th** | **10th** | **R1 PP** | **FL** |
| Points | 25 | 18 | 15 | 12 | 10 | 8 | 6 | 4 | 2 | 1 | 3 | 1 |

=== Drivers' standings ===
| Pos | Driver | SEP1 (Malaysia) | | | | | | CLA (Philippines) | | | | | | CHA (Thailand) | | | | | | SEP2 (Malaysia) | | | | | | SEP3 (Malaysia) | | | | | | Pts |
|---|---|---|---|---|---|---|---|---|---|---|---|---|---|---|---|---|---|---|---|---|---|---|---|---|---|---|---|---|---|---|---|---|
| 1 | (China) Daniel Cao | 1 | 1 | 2 | 1 | 4 | C | 2 | 1 | 1 | **1** | 2 | 1 | 1 | 2 | 4 | 2 | 3 | 2 | 1 | 3 | 2 | 8 | 6 | 3 | 2 | 1 | 4 | 7 | 6 | 7 | 508 |
| 2 | (Thailand) Kane Shepherd | 4 | 5 | 4 | 4 | 2 | C | 3 | 3 | 4 | 3 | 4 | 2 | 2 | 3 | 3 | 5 | 5 | 3 | 7 | 5 | 8 | 1 | 4 | 1 | 1 | 5 | 1 | 5 | Ret | 4 | 377 |
| 3 | (Belgium) Ugo de Wilde | | | | | | | | | | | | | **3** | 1 | 1 | **1** | 1 | 6 | 3 | 8 | Ret | 2 | 1 | 5 | | | | | | | 212 |
| 4 | (Malaysia) Nazim Azman | 5 | 4 | 6 | 3 | 1 | C | | | | | | | Ret | 4 | 2 | 3 | 2 | 1 | | | | | | | 6 | 12 | 9 | 6 | 3 | 6 | 205 |
| 5 | (Philippines) Ben Grimes | | | | | | | **1** | Ret | 2 | 2 | 1 | 3 | Ret | 5 | 6 | Ret | 6 | 4 | | | | | | | | | | | | | 154 |
| 6 | (Japan) Hibiki Taira | | | | | | | | | | | | | | | | | | | 5 | 2 | Ret | 4 | 2 | 2 | 5 | 8 | 7 | 4 | 8 | 5 | 127 |
| 7 | (Republic of Ireland) Luke Thompson | 8 | 7 | 8 | 8 | 8 | C | 7 | 6 | 7 | 6 | 7 | 6 | WD | WD | WD | WD | WD | WD | 12 | Ret | 5 | 11 | 12 | 11 | 8 | 6 | 5 | 10 | 7 | 11 | 103 |
| 8 | (Malaysia) Muizz Musyaffa | | | | | | | | | | | | | | | | | | | 10 | 10 | 6 | 6 | 10 | 7 | 4 | 7 | 11 | 2 | 5 | 1 | 99 |
| 9 | (Malaysia) Adam Khalid | | | | | | | 4 | 4 | 3 | Ret | 5 | 5 | | | | | | | 4 | 6 | Ret | DNS | 5 | 6 | | | | | | | 97 |
| 10 | (Indonesia) Presley Martono | | | | | | | | | | | | | | | | | | | | | | | | | 10 | 2 | 3 | 3 | 1 | 3 | 93 |
| 11 | (France) Alessandro Ghiretti | | | | | | | | | | | | | | | | | | | | | | | | | 3 | 3 | 2 | 1 | 2 | 10 | 92 |
| 12 | (Sri Lanka) Eshan Pieris | 3 | 6 | 5 | 6 | 5 | C | | | | | | | | | | | | | 8 | 1 | Ret | DNS | 8 | Ret | | | | | | | 88 |
| 13 | (Malaysia) Mitchell Cheah | | | | | | | | | | | | | | | | | | | 6 | 4 | 1 | 5 | 3 | 4 | | | | | | | 85 |
| 14 | (Philippines) Sam Grimes | | | | | | | Ret | 2 | 8 | Ret | 3 | 8 | 4 | 7 | 7 | 6 | Ret | 5 | | | | | | | | | | | | | 79 |
| 15 | (India) Nayan Chatterjee | 6 | 3 | 3 | 2 | 3 | C | | | | | | | | | | | | | | | | | | | | | | | | | 76 |
| 16 | (Thailand) Shivin Sirinarinthon | 9 | 8 | 7 | 7 | 7 | C | 6 | 7 | 6 | 5 | 6 | 4 | | | | | | | | | | | | | | | | | | | 76 |
| 17 | (Singapore) Danial Frost | **2** | 2 | **1** | 9 | 9 | C | | | | | | | | | | | | | | | | | | | | | | | | | 71 |
| 18 | (Australia) Aaron Love | | | | | | | | | | | | | | | | | | | 2 | 7 | 3 | 3 | 7 | 8 | | | | | | | 64 |
| 19 | (Malaysia) Isyraf Danish | WD | WD | WD | WD | WD | C | | | | | | | | | | | | | | | | | | | 7 | 4 | 6 | 8 | 4 | 2 | 60 |
| 20 | (Malaysia) Timothy Yeo | | | | | | | 5 | 5 | 5 | 4 | 8 | 7 | | | | | | | | | | | | | 12 | 10 | 8 | 9 | Ret | 12 | 59 |
| 21 | (Thailand) Sasakorn Chaimongkol | | | | | | | | | | | | | Ret | 6 | 5 | 4 | 4 | 7 | | | | | | | | | | | | | 42 |
| 22 | (Indonesia) Perdana Putra Minang | 7 | 9 | 9 | 5 | 6 | C | | | | | | | | | | | | | | | | | | | | | | | | | 28 |
| 23 | (Taiwan) Benson Lin | | | | | | | | | | | | | | | | | | | 9 | 9 | 7 | 7 | 9 | 9 | | | | | | | 20 |
| 24 | (Malaysia) Alister Yoong | | | | | | | | | | | | | | | | | | | 13 | Ret | 4 | 9 | 13 | 12 | | | | | | | 14 |
| 25 | (Malaysia) Armand Johany | | | | | | | | | | | | | | | | | | | | | | | | | 11 | 9 | 10 | Ret | Ret | 8 | 7 |
| 26 | (Malaysia) Arsh Johany | | | | | | | | | | | | | | | | | | | | | | | | | 9 | 11 | 12 | DNS | 9 | 9 | 6 |
| 27 | (Sri Lanka) Liam Lawrence | | | | | | | | | | | | | | | | | | | 11 | 11 | 9 | 10 | 11 | 10 | | | | | | | 4 |
| Pos | Driver | SEP1 (Malaysia) | | | | | | CLA (Philippines) | | | | | | CHA (Thailand) | | | | | | SEP2 (Malaysia) | | | | | | SEP3 (Malaysia) | | | | | | Pts |

| Colour | Result |
|---|---|
| Gold | Winner |
| Silver | Second place |
| Bronze | Third place |
| Green | Points classification |
| Blue | Non-points classification |
| Blue | Non-classified finish (NC) |
| Purple | Retired, not classified (Ret) |
| Red | Did not qualify (DNQ) |
| Red | Did not pre-qualify (DNPQ) |
| Black | Disqualified (DSQ) |
| White | Did not start (DNS) |
| White | Withdrew (WD) |
| White | Race cancelled (C) |
| Blank | Did not practice (DNP) |
| Blank | Did not arrive (DNA) |
| Blank | Excluded (EX) |

**Bold** – Pole
Italics – Fastest Lap

=== Rookie Cup ===
| Pos | Driver | Pts |
|---|---|---|
| 1 | (Thailand) Kane Shepherd | 377 |
| 2 | (Japan) Hibiki Taira | 127 |
| 3 | (Malaysia) Muizz Musyaffa | 99 |
| 4 | (France) Alessandro Ghiretti | 92 |
| 5 | (Sri Lanka) Eshan Pieris | 88 |
| 6 | (Malaysia) Mitchell Cheah | 85 |
| 7 | (Philippines) Sam Grimes | 79 |
| 8 | (Thailand) Shivin Sirinarinthon | 76 |
| 9 | (Thailand) Sasakorn Chaimongkol | 42 |
| 10 | (Indonesia) Perdana Putra Minang | 28 |
| 11 | (Taiwan) Benson Lin | 20 |
| 12 | (Malaysia) Alister Yoong | 13 |
| 14 | (Malaysia) Armand Johany | 7 |
| 15 | (Malaysia) Arsh Johany | 6 |
| 16 | (Sri Lanka) Liam Lawrence | 4 |
