= 2018 Asian Formula Renault Series =

Motor racing competition

The 2018 Asian Formula Renault Series (aka AFR Series) is the 19th season of the AFR Series since its creation in 2000 by FRD. The season will begin on 17 March at the Zhuhai International Circuit and will end after six double-header events.

Starting from 2015, drivers and teams compete in two classes, Pro (Class A) for drivers and teams competing with the 2013 FR2.0 car, and Elite (Class B) for drivers and teams using the FR2.0 old spec cars.

As part of an enhanced agreement with Renault Sport, the season will feature a scholarship program for young Chinese drivers, called Road to Champion. The winner among these drivers over the last three rounds of the championship will secure a link to race the following year in Europe with the help of Renault Sport.

By virtue of a 67 point lead in the 2018 Team Championship at the conclusion of Race Two in Sepang on August 26, BlackArts Racing Team won the Team Championship for the 4th consecutive year in the Asia Formula Renault Series, with one round remaining.

== Teams and drivers ==
Team	No.	Driver name	Class	Rounds
Asia Racing Team	1	(Indonesia) Perdana Putra Minang	P	1–2
Asia Racing Team	3	(Singapore) Ni Weiliang	P	1–2
Asia Racing Team	5	(Indonesia) Keanon Santoso	P	2
Asia Racing Team	11	(Indonesia) Akmal Ashibli	E	1
Wu Racing	4	(Hong Kong) Jimmy Cheung	E	1
BlackArts Racing Team	9	(Switzerland) Thomas Lüdi	P	1–2
BlackArts Racing Team	19	(China) Ryan Liu	P	1–2
BlackArts Racing Team	51	(Taiwan) Oscar Lee	E	1
BlackArts Racing Team	55	(China) Daniel Cao	P	1–2
BlackArts Racing Team	66	(China) Eric Sun	E	1–2
BlackArts Racing Team	69	(Italy) Matteo Radicioni	E	1
BlackArts Racing Team	88	(Spain) Antolín González	P	1–2
BlackArts Racing Team	91	(Hong Kong) David Pun	P	1–2
Spirit-Z Racing	16	(Hong Kong) Rocky Chan	E	2
KRC Racing	17	(China) Stephen Hong	P	1–2
KRC Racing	22	(Taiwan) Peter Liao	P	1–2
Eurasia Motorsport	20	(Philippines) Daniel Julián Miranda	P	1–2
Eurasia Motorsport	30	(Sri Lanka) Eshan Pieris	P	1
Eurasia Motorsport	96	(Australia) Kurt Hill	P	1–2
PS Racing	18	(China) Neric Wei	P	2
PS Racing	26	(Hong Kong) David Lau	E	1
PS Racing	27	(Monaco) Louis Prette	P	1
S&D Motorsports	44	(China) Luo Kailuo	P	1–2
S&D Motorsports	99	(Macau) Hugo Hung	P	1–2

Icon	Class
P	Pro
E	Elite

== Race calendar and results ==
The calendar for the 2018 season was published on 9 November 2017.

Round		Circuit	Date	Pole position	Fastest lap	Winning driver	Winning team	Class B Winner
1	R1	(China) Zhuhai International Circuit, Zhuhai	17 March	(Spain) Antolín González	(Spain) Antolín González	(Spain) Antolín González	(Hong Kong) BlackArts Racing Team	(Indonesia) Akmal Ashibli
1	R2	(China) Zhuhai International Circuit, Zhuhai	18 March	(Monaco) Louis Prette	(Australia) Kurt Hill	(Indonesia) Perdana Putra Minang	(Macau) Asia Racing Team	(China) Eric Sun
2	R3	(China) Shanghai International Circuit, Shanghai	29 April	(China) Daniel Cao	(China) Daniel Cao	(China) Daniel Cao	(Hong Kong) BlackArts Racing Team	(China) Eric Sun
2	R4	(China) Shanghai International Circuit, Shanghai	29 April	(China) Daniel Cao	(China) Luo Kailuo	(China) Daniel Cao	(Hong Kong) BlackArts Racing Team	(China) Eric Sun
3	R5	(China) Ningbo International Circuit, Ningbo	26 May	(China) Daniel Cao	(China) Daniel Cao	(China) Luo Kailuo	(Malaysia) S&D Motorsports	
3	R6	(China) Ningbo International Circuit, Ningbo	27 May	(China) Daniel Cao	(Macau) Charles Leong	(Macau) Charles Leong	(Macau) Asia Racing Team	
4	R7	(China) Zhuhai International Circuit	16 June	(Macau) Charles Leong	(Indonesia) Perdana Putra Minang	(Macau) Charles Leong	(Macau) Asia Racing Team	
4	R8	(China) Zhuhai International Circuit	17 June	(Macau) Charles Leong	(China) Daniel Cao	(Macau) Charles Leong	(Macau) Asia Racing Team	
5	R9	(Malaysia) Sepang International Circuit, Sepang	25 August	(China) Daniel Cao	(China) Daniel Cao	(China) Daniel Cao	(Hong Kong) BlackArts Racing Team	
5	R10	(Malaysia) Sepang International Circuit, Sepang	26 August	(China) Daniel Cao	(China) Daniel Cao	(China) Daniel Cao	(Hong Kong) BlackArts Racing Team	
6	R11	(Malaysia) Sepang International Circuit, Sepang	29 September	(China) Daniel Cao	(China) Daniel Cao	(China) Daniel Cao	(Hong Kong) BlackArts Racing Team	
6	R12	(Malaysia) Sepang International Circuit, Sepang	30 September	(China) Daniel Cao	(Spain) Antolín González	(China) Daniel Cao	(Hong Kong) BlackArts Racing Team	

== Championship standings ==
Points system

Points are awarded to the top 14 classified finishers. Drivers in Pro and Elite classes are classified separately.

Drivers' Championship
Position	**1st**	**2nd**	**3rd**	**4th**	**5th**	**6th**	**7th**	**8th**	**9th**	**10th**	**11th**	**12th**	**13th**	**14th**
Points	30	24	20	17	15	13	11	9	7	5	4	3	2	1

=== Drivers' Championships ===
Pos	Driver	ZIC (China)		SIC (China)		NIS (China)		ZIC (China)		SEP (Malaysia)		SEP (Malaysia)	Pts
Pro
1	(China) Daniel Cao	20	0	30	30	24	20	15	20	30	30		219
2	(China) Luo Kai Luo	24	24	17	1	30	15	20	17	24	17		189
3	(Spain) Antolín González	30	Ret	15	24	11	17	17	24	20	24		182
4	(Indonesia) Perdana Putra Minang	Ret	30	24	17	20	24	24	15	DNS	DNS		154
5	(Philippines) Daniel Julian Miranda	4	7	20	15	0	11	11	0	15	15		98
6	(Macau) Charles Leong	0	0	0	0	Ret	30	30	30	0	0		90
7	(Hong Kong) David Pun	11	15	5	11	17	7	0	11	0	9		86
8	(Australia) Kurt Hill	15	20	13	20	Ret	Ret	Ret	13	DNS	DNS		81
9	(Sri Lanka) Eshan Pieris	5	0	0	0	0	13	13	0	17	20		68
10	(Taiwan) Peter Liao	7	11	9	7	15	9	9	0	0	0		67
11	(Hong Kong) Stephen Hong	0	9	11	13	0	0	0	0	0	11		44
12	(Switzerland) Thomas Lüdi	9	5	2	1	13	5	7	0	0	1		43
13	(Hong Kong) Hugo Hung	2	4	0	4	9	3	3	9	7	0		41
14	(China) Ryan Liu	13	17	4	5	0	0	0	0	0	0		39
15	(Indonesia) Keanon Santoso	0	0	0	0	0	0	5	0	13	13		31
Elite
1	(Indonesia) Akmal Ashibli	14	13										54
2	(China) Eric Sun	16	12										50
3	(Hong Kong) Jimmy Cheung	15	14										44
4	(Italy) Matteo Radicioni	17	17										30
5	(Taiwan) Oscar Lee	Ret	15										17
6	(Hong Kong) David Lau	Ret	16										15
Pos	Driver	ZIC (China)		SIC (China)		NIS (China)		ZIC (China)		SEP (Malaysia)		SEP (Malaysia)	Pts

Colour	Result
Gold	Winner
Silver	Second place
Bronze	Third place
Green	Points classification
Blue	Non-points classification
Blue	Non-classified finish (NC)
Purple	Retired, not classified (Ret)
Red	Did not qualify (DNQ)
Red	Did not pre-qualify (DNPQ)
Black	Disqualified (DSQ)
White	Did not start (DNS)
White	Withdrew (WD)
White	Race cancelled (C)
Blank	Did not practice (DNP)
Blank	Did not arrive (DNA)
Blank	Excluded (EX)

**Bold** – Pole
Italics – Fastest Lap
