= Clark International Speedway =

Motorsport race track in Philippines

CIS
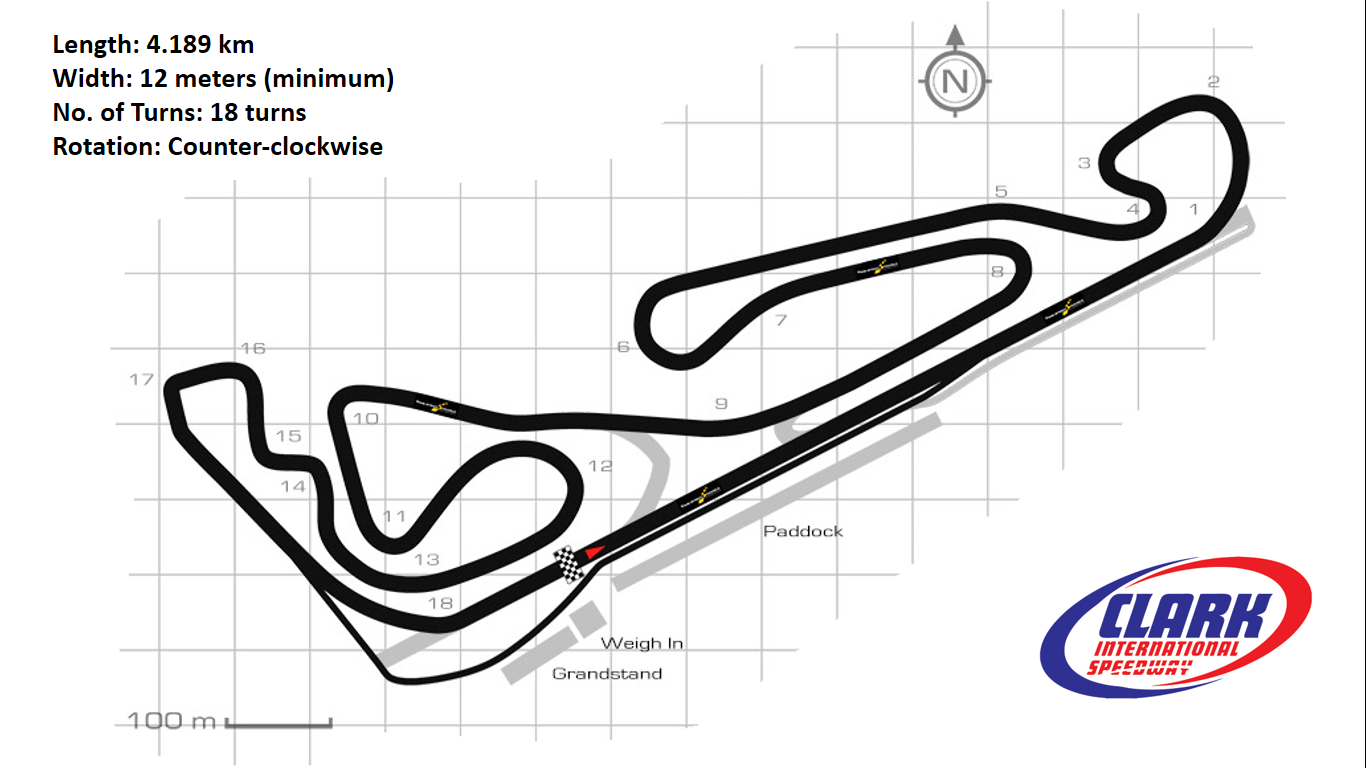
- Clark International Speedway Layout
- Location: Clark Freeport Zone, Mabalacat, Pampanga, Philippines
- Coordinates: 15°12′28″N 120°32′15″E
- Broke ground: 2007
- Opened: 15 November 2008; 17 years ago
- Major events: Former: F4 SEA (2016–2017)
- Website: https://www.clarkinternationalspeedway.com

Full Circuit (2012–present)
- Length: 4.189 km (2.603 mi)
- Turns: 18
- Race lap record: 1:55:607 ( (China) Daniel Cao, Mygale M14-F4, 2017, F4)

Clark International Speedway, abbreviated as CIS, is a motorsport venue at the Clark Freeport Zone in Mabalacat, Pampanga, Philippines.

== History ==
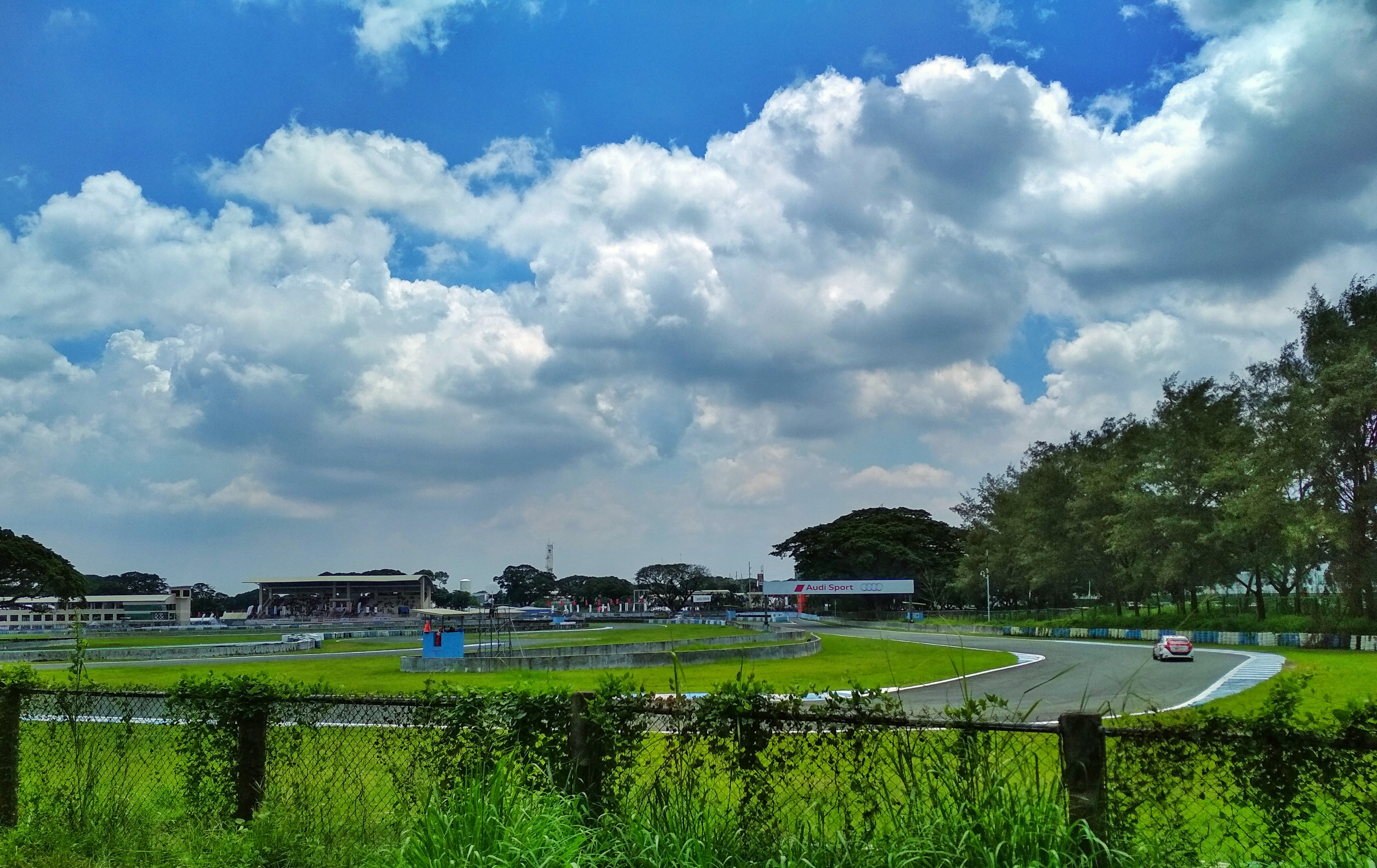
Clark International Speedway, September 2017

It was built on November 15, 2008. The 4.189 km (2.603 mi) circuit features 18 turns and runs in a counter-clockwise direction. Clark International Speedway hosts both 2- and 4-wheeled events. This includes the Philippine Superbike Championship, Toyota Vios Cup, Philippine GT Championship, Philippine Touring Car Championship, and FlatOut Race Series. The layout also has a 1 km (0.62 mi) drag strip that hosts the National Drag Racing Championship.

The Philippine Sports Commission and V8 Supercars CEO Martin Whitaker announced that the circuit would hold a round of V8 Supercars on 10–11 November 2012, but series management never officially ratified the event and it did not appear on the calendar.

The circuit hosted the second event of the 2016–17 Formula 4 South East Asia Championship. This was the first event in the motorsport venue to be certified by the Fédération Internationale de l'Automobile.

Aside from car races, CIS also hosts several motorcycle sports including the Pirelli Petron National Motorcycle Racing Championship and the Philippine Superbike Championship held every May to October.

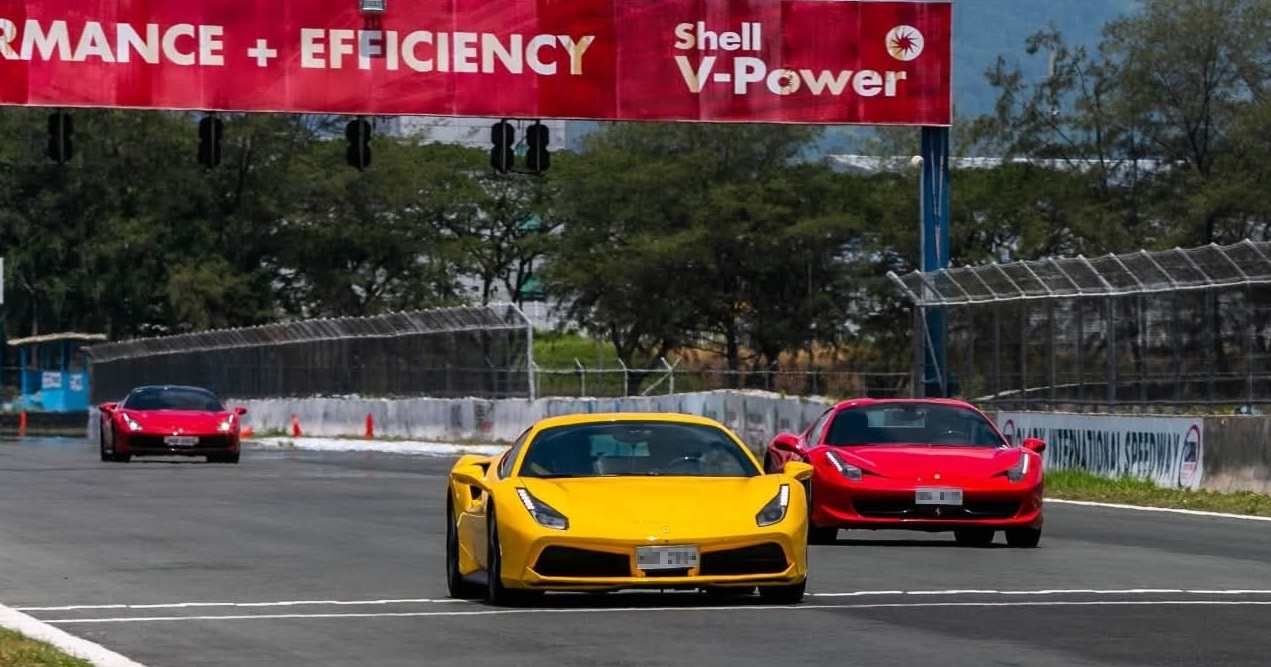
Multiple Ferrari's speeding on the track during the event of Ferrari Philippines

== Track Days ==
Clark International Speedway offers host private events as well. Below are some pictures from the California Superbike School Philippines 2025 Track Day, held on April 12-13th 2025.

California Superbike School Philippines Track Day 2025
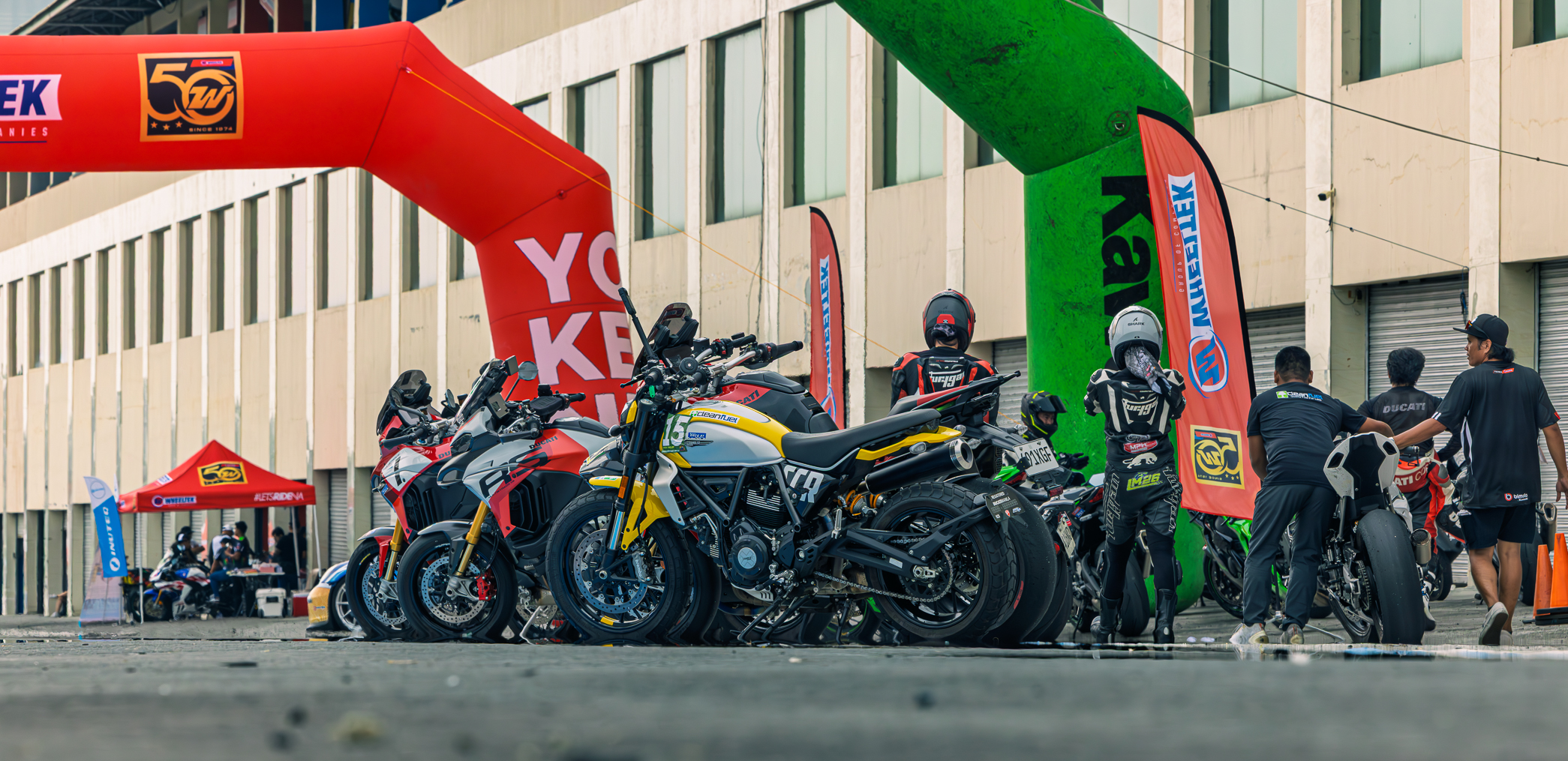
California Superbike School Track Day 2025 Group

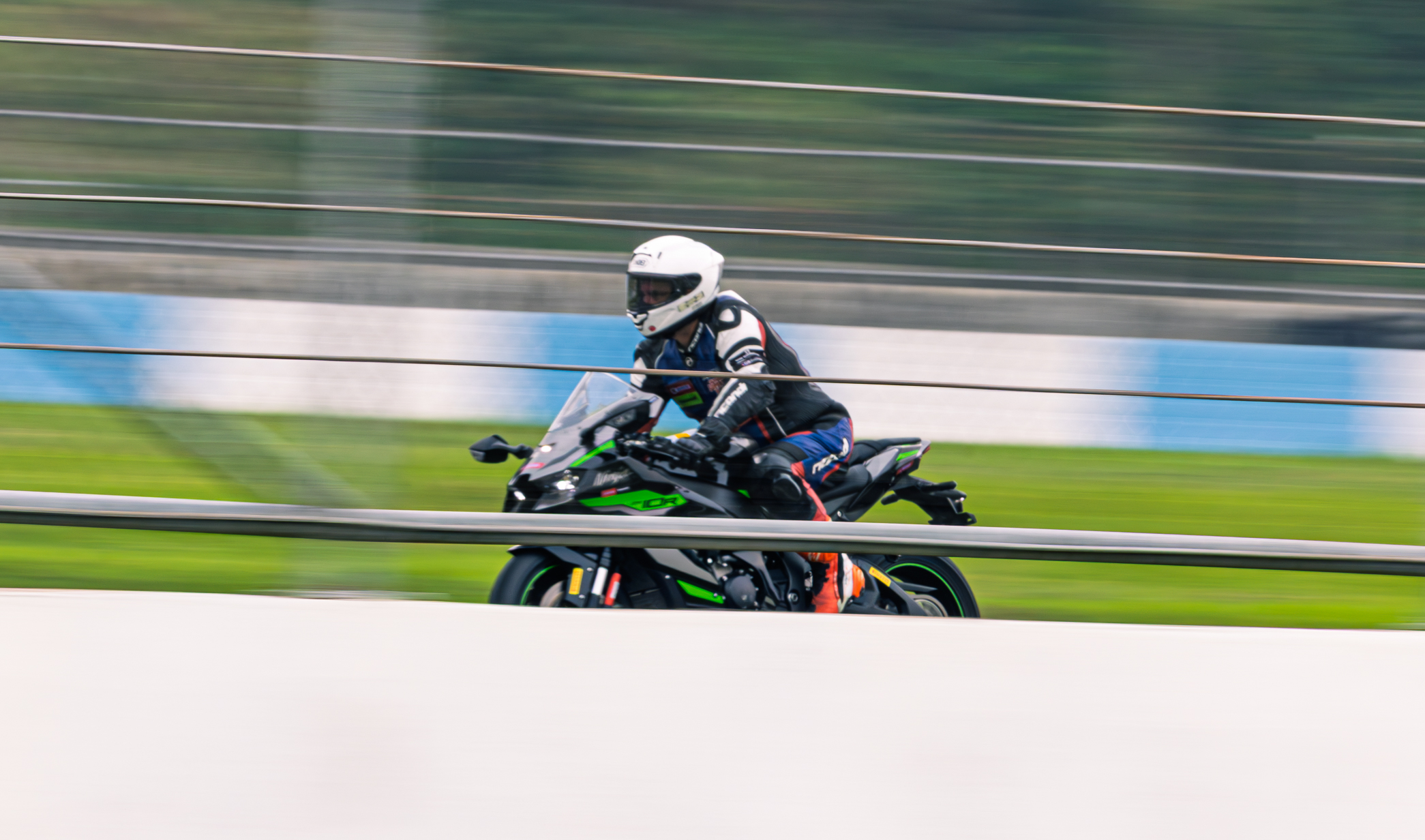
Kawasaki ZX10R

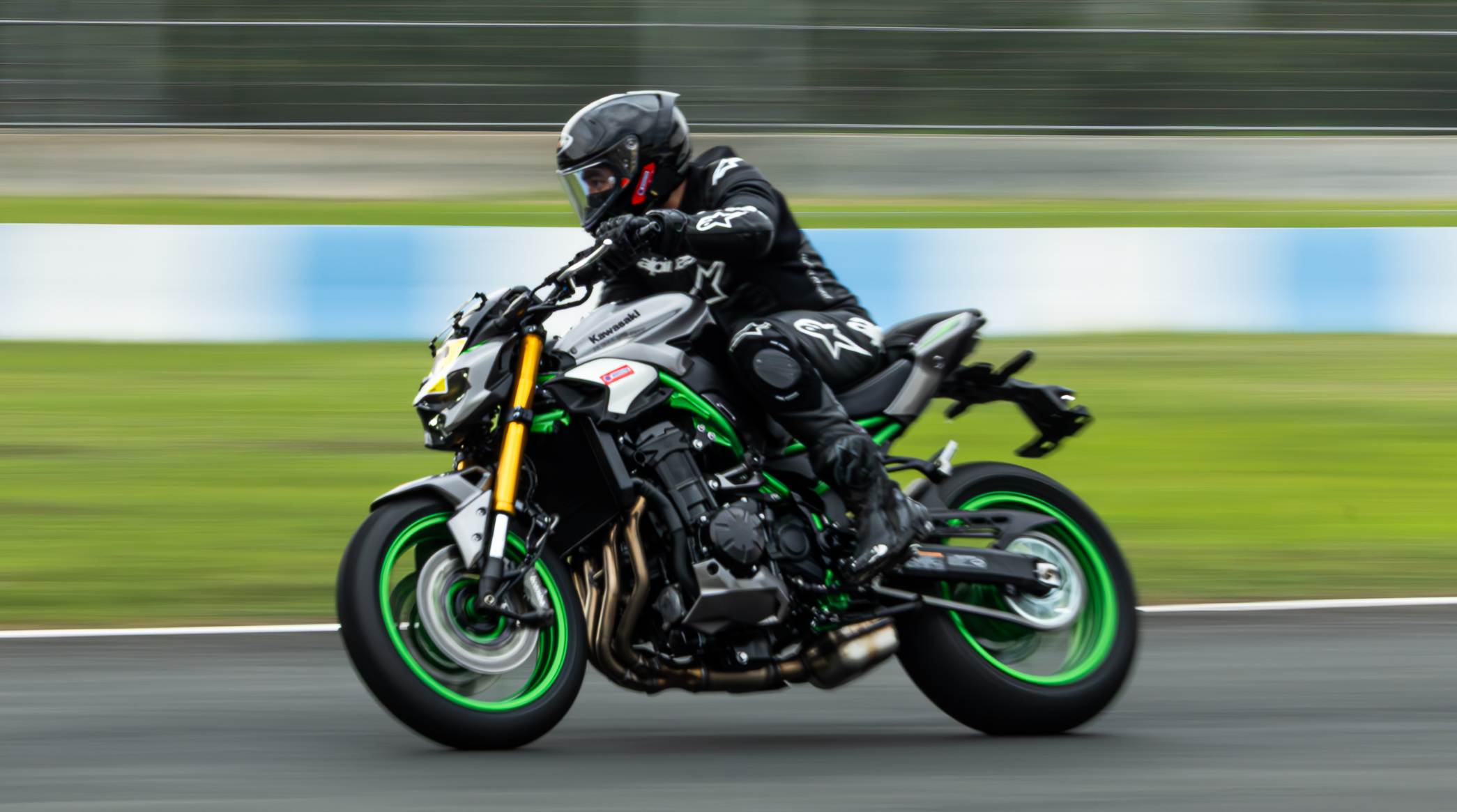
Kawasaki Z900

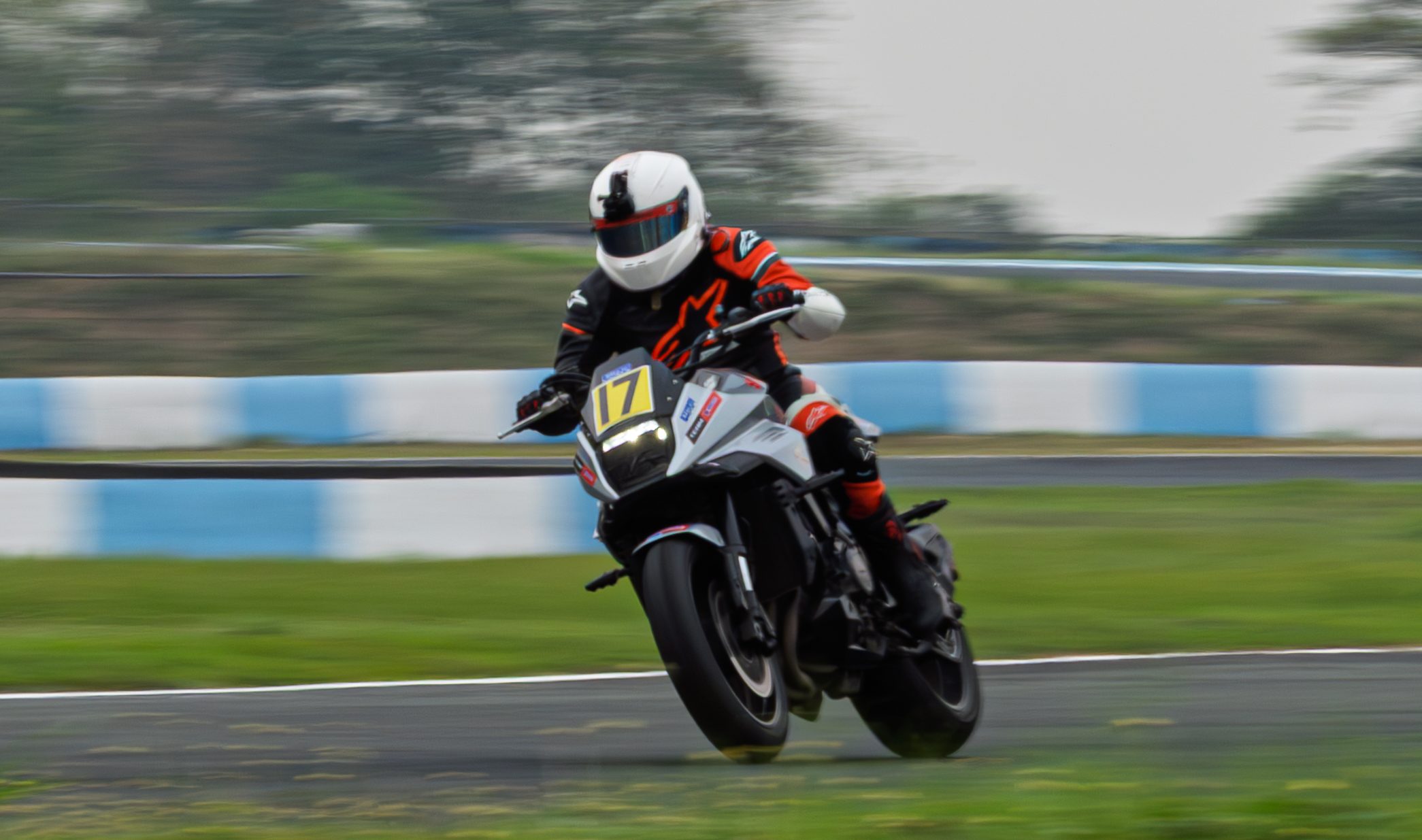
KTM 990

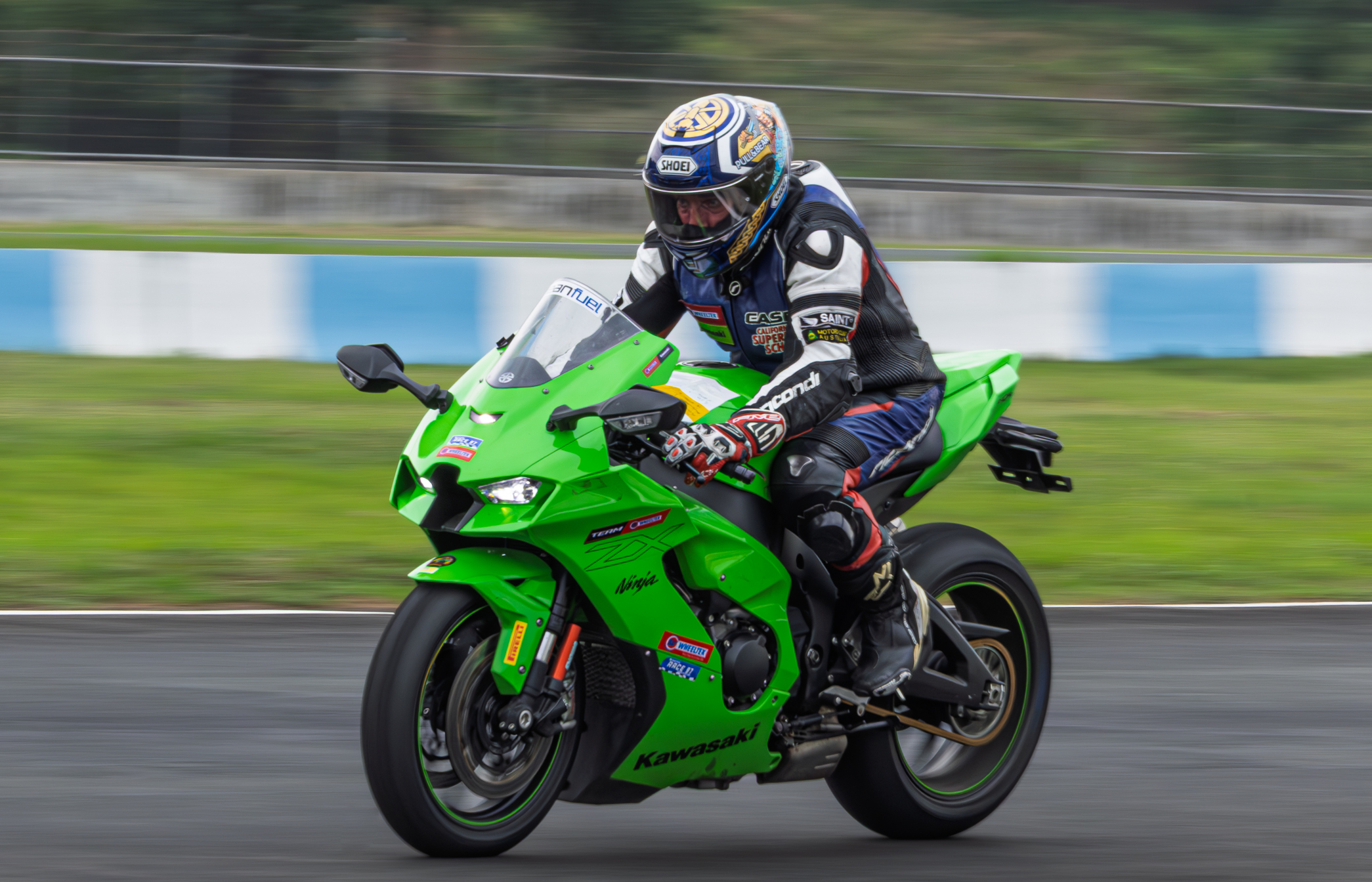
Kawasaki Ninja 1000

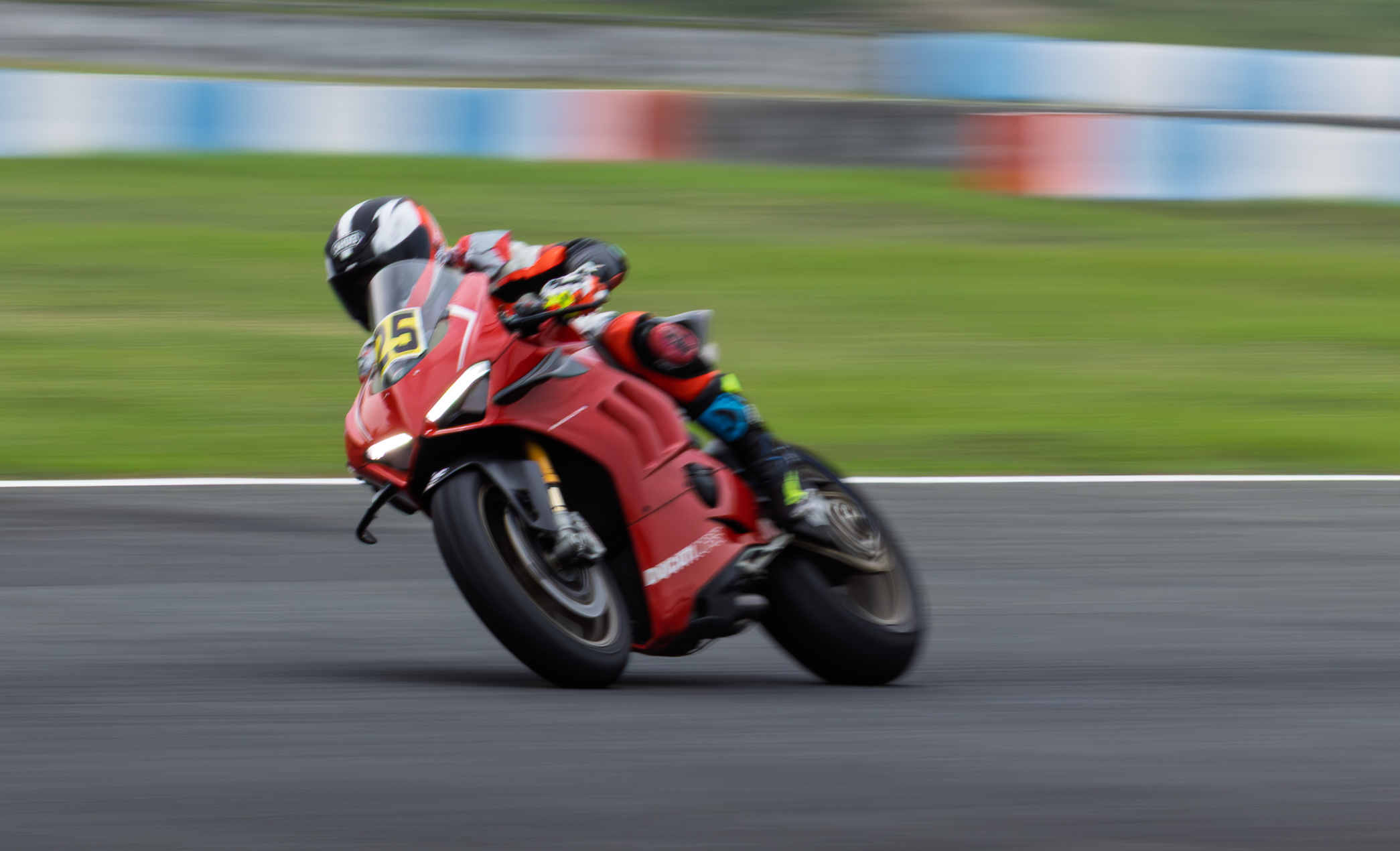
Ducati Panigale V4

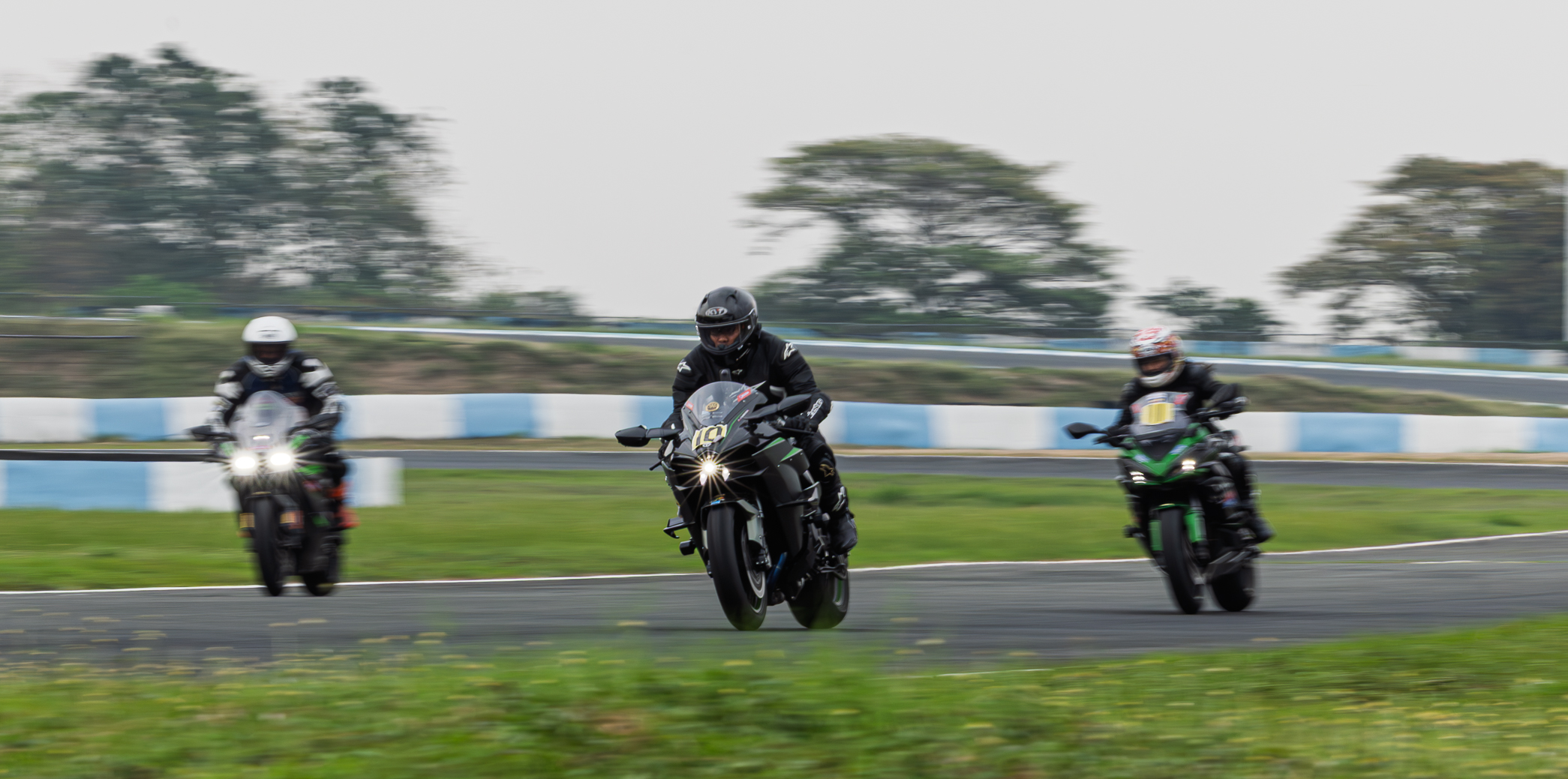
Kawasaki Ninja H2

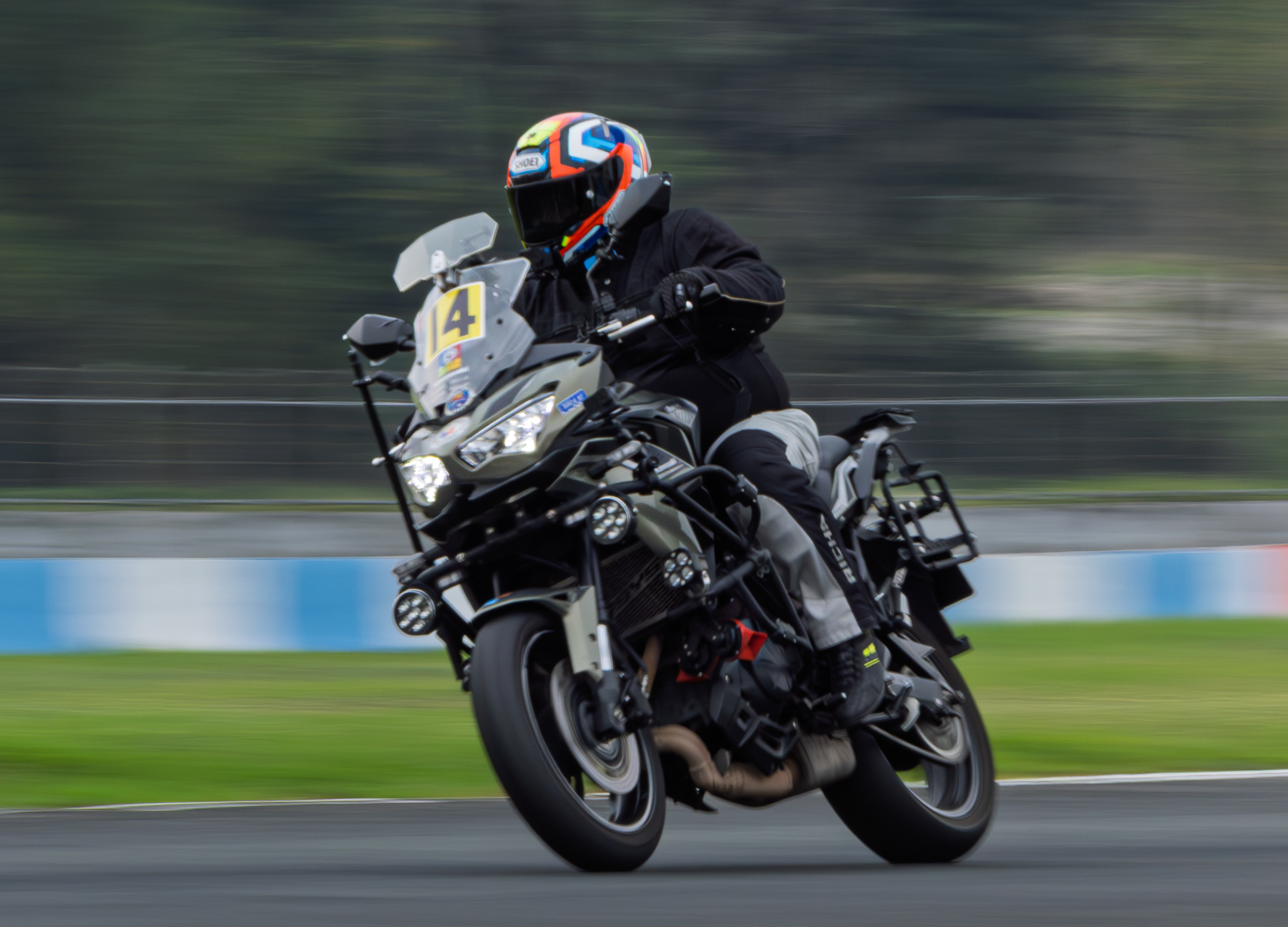
Kawasaki Versys 650

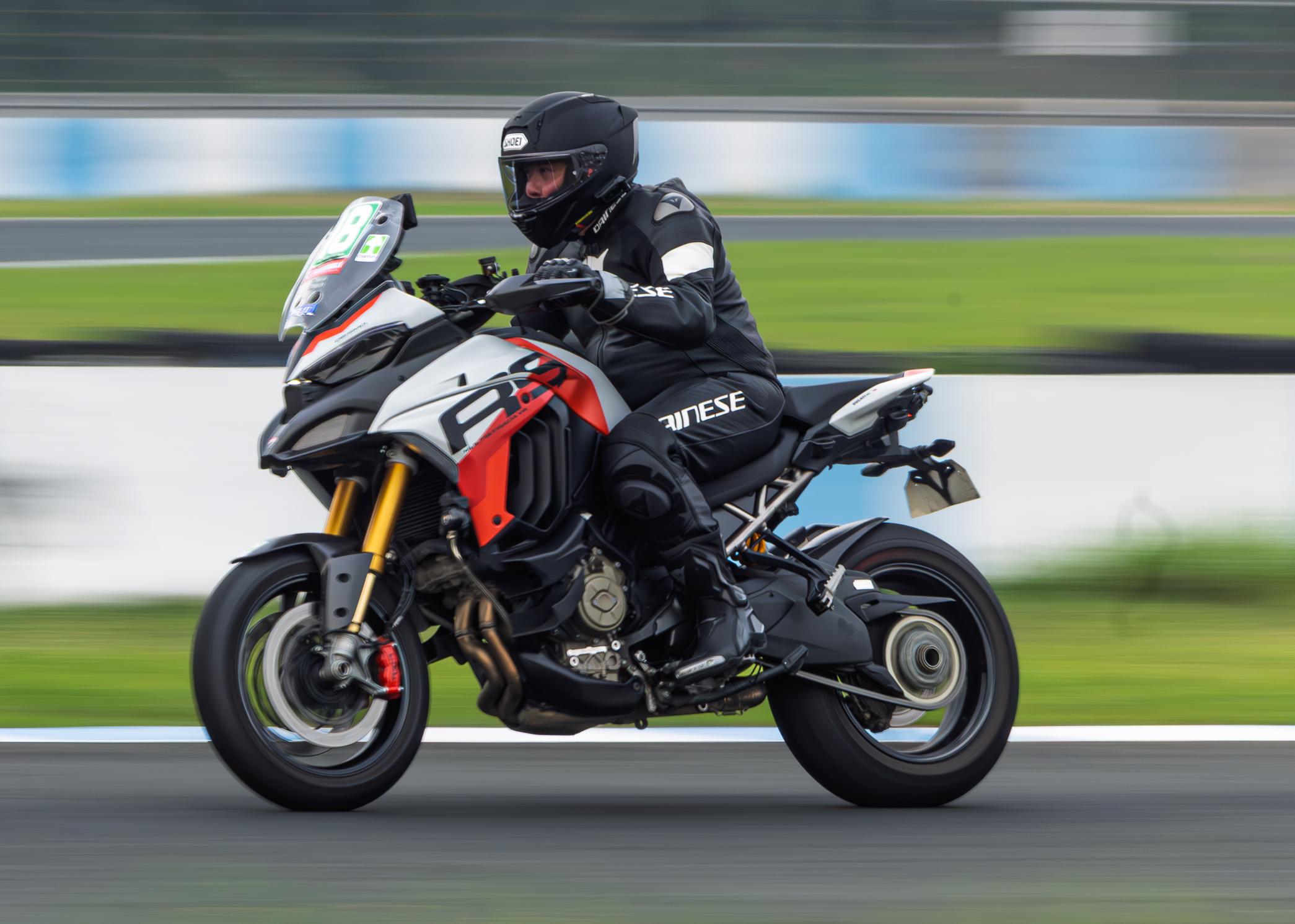
Ducati Multistrada V4 RS

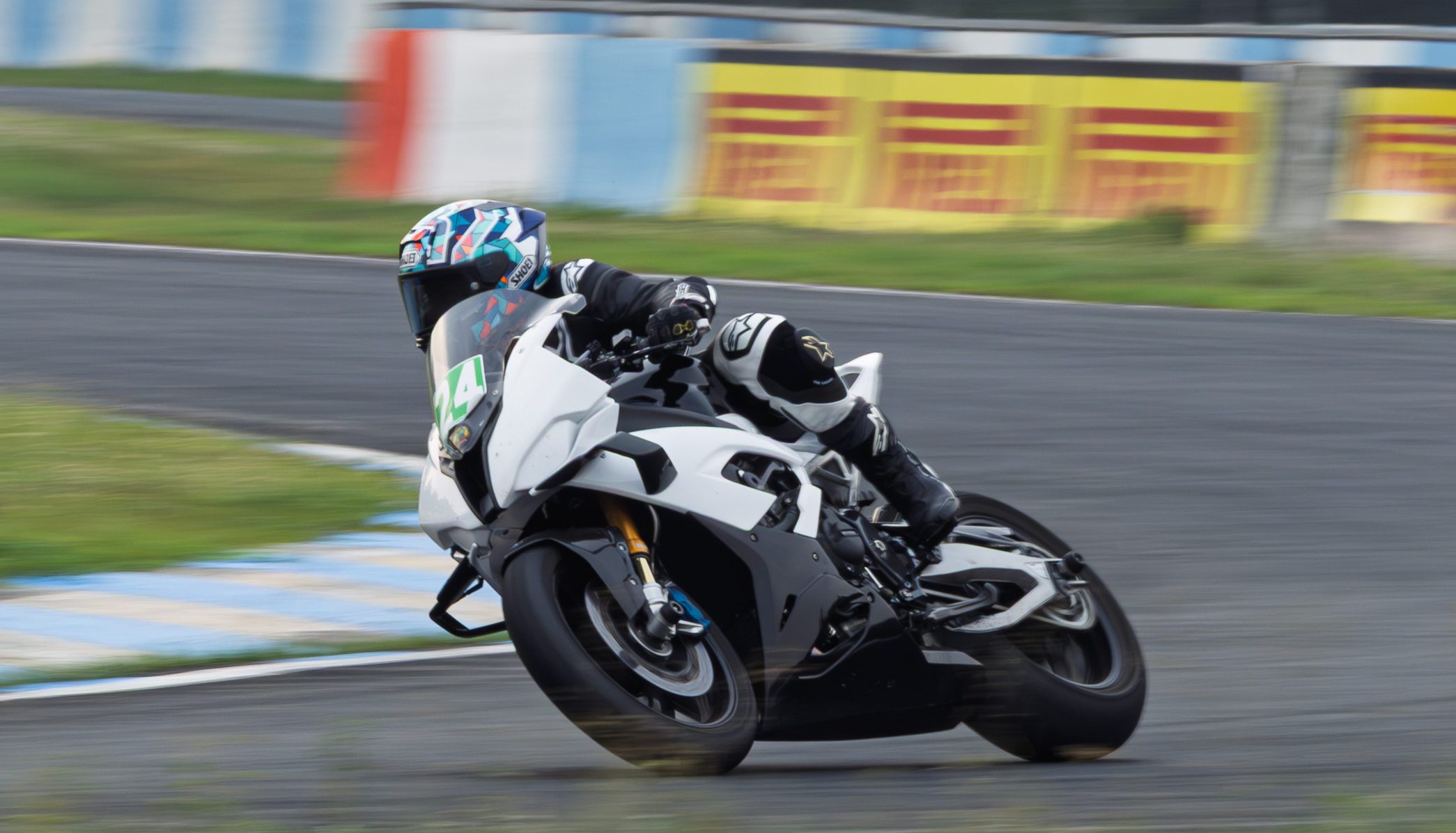
BMW S 1000 RR

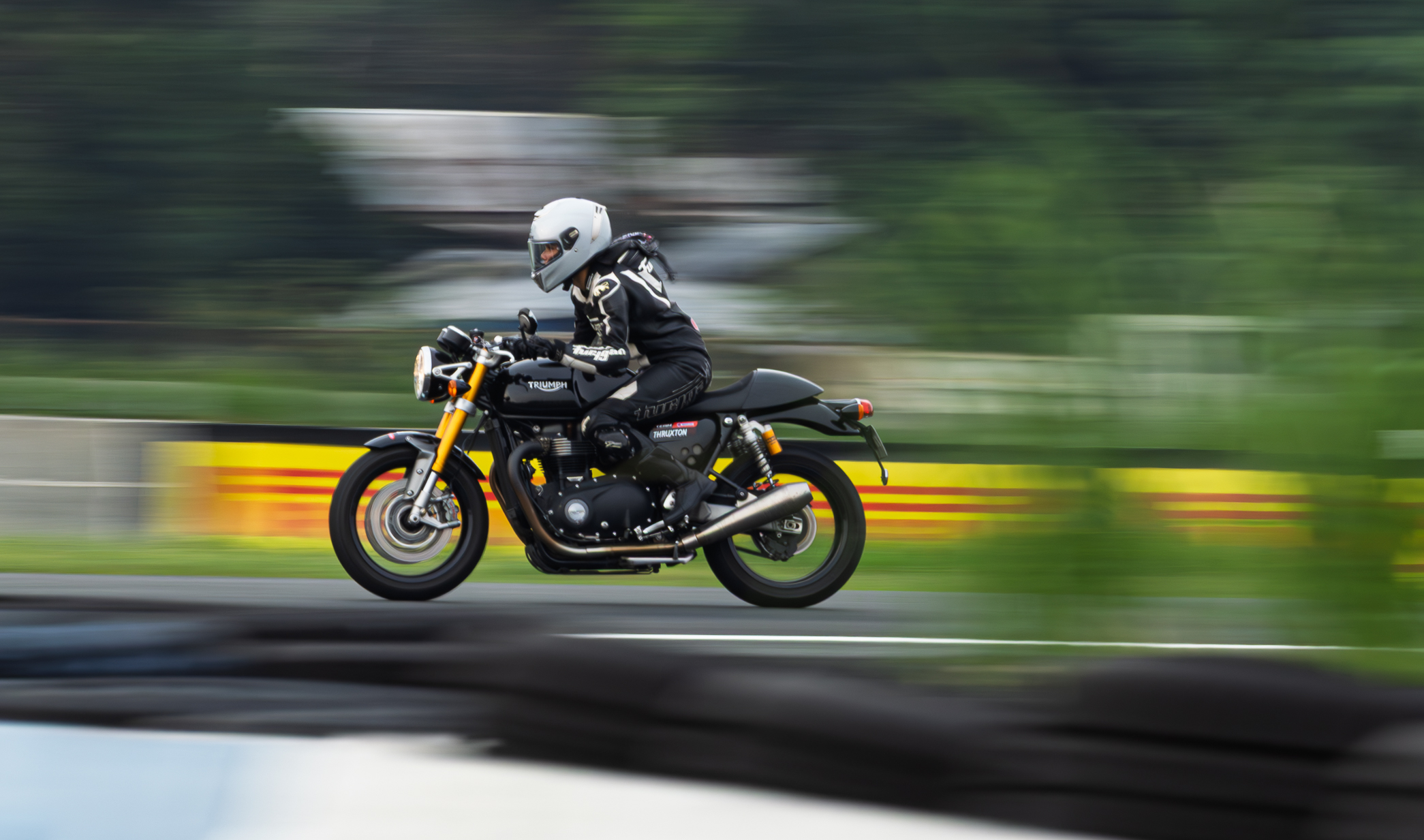
Triumph Thruxton RS

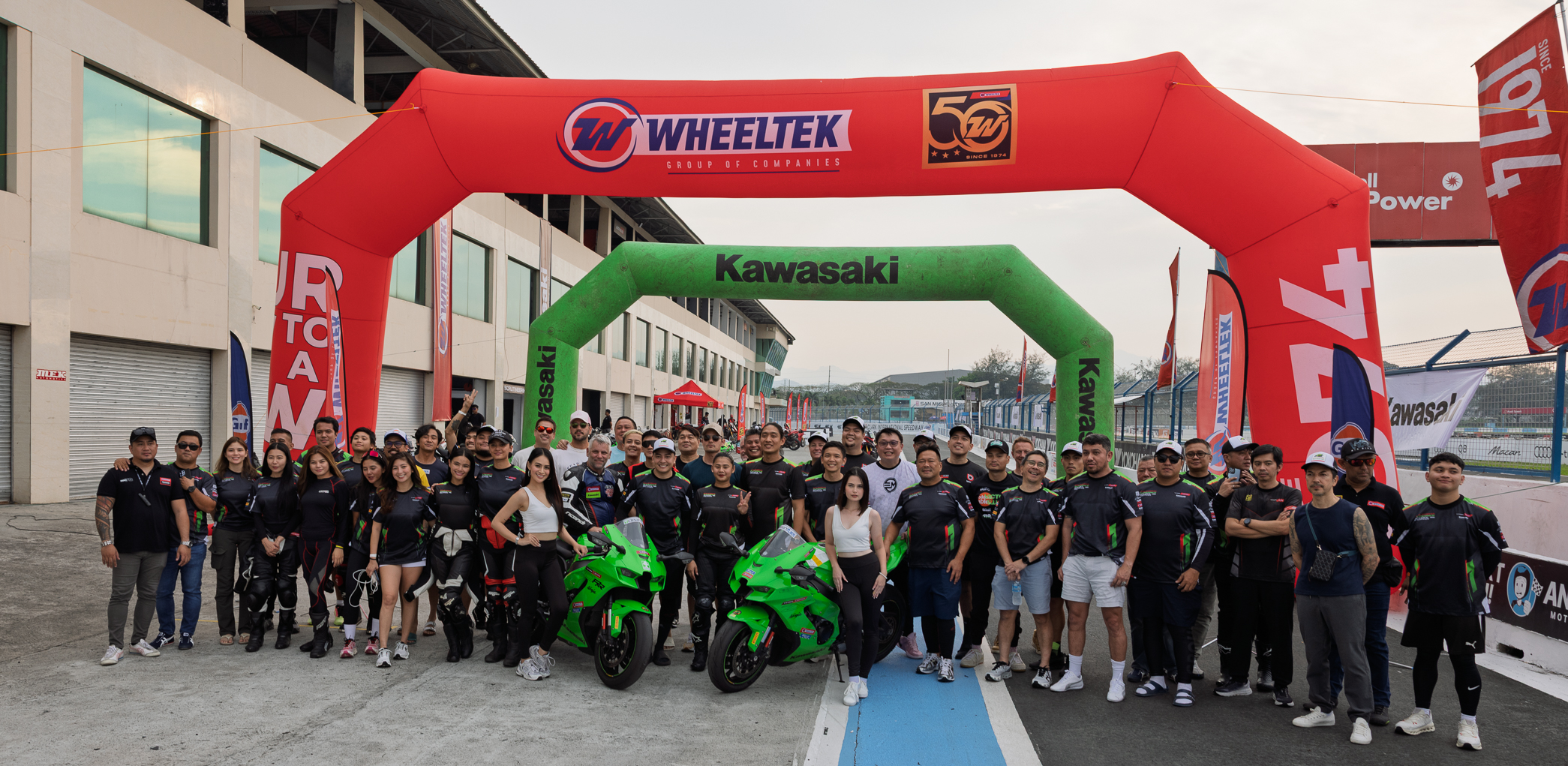
California Superbike School Track Day 2025 Group Picture
