= Formula Regional Asian Championship =

Single-seater racing championship

- Category: Formula 3 Formula Regional
- Region: Asia
- Inaugural season: 2018
- Folded: 2022
- Constructors: Tatuus
- Engine suppliers: Autotecnica
- Tyre suppliers: Giti Tire
- Last Drivers' champion: (Monaco) Arthur Leclerc
- Last Teams' champion: Mumbai Falcons India Racing
- Official website: Official website

The Formula Regional Asian Championship was an FIA-certified regional Formula 3 racing series, which started in 2018. On 26 January 2018 it was confirmed that pan-Asian promoter Top Speed would organise the championship. Despite using Formula Regional cars since its establishment, the series was called F3 Asian Championship for four years until it was eventually rebranded in December 2021, when the FIA brought an end to F3 as a category.

The inaugural 2018 championship season featured 15 races held during five rounds of 3-race weekends on circuits across Asia. The driver champion receives FIA Super Licence points, while also it features the AM (amateur) and teams standings.

== Car ==
The championship features Tatuus designed and built cars. The cars will be constructed out of carbon fibre and feature a monocoque chassis which feature a number of enhanced safety features including the new Halo device and improved side impact protection, and will have a six-speed paddle shift gear box. The car will be powered by a single-make 270 hp turbo engine provided by Autotecnica.

== Return ==
On November 17, 2026, plans for the return of the Formula Regional Asian Championship in 2027 were announced at the Macau Grand Prix. The revived championship is scheduled to feature six rounds across three countries: China, South Korea, and Malaysia.

== Champions ==
=== Drivers' ===
Season	Driver	Team	Poles	Wins	Podiums	Fastest laps	Points	Clinched	Margin
2018	(United Kingdom) Raoul Hyman (Note: Hyman is a South African driver who raced under a British license.)	(United Kingdom) Dragon Hitech GP	0	1	11	2	227	Race 15 of 15	2
2019	(Japan) Ukyo Sasahara	(United Kingdom) Dragon Hitech GP	7	8	13	7	301	Race 14 of 15	25
2019–20	(Netherlands) Joey Alders	(Hong Kong) BlackArts Racing Team	0	5	11	3	266	Race 14 of 15	37
2021	(China) Zhou Guanyu	(United Arab Emirates) Abu Dhabi Racing by Prema	5	4	11	5	257	Race 15 of 15	16
2022	(Monaco) Arthur Leclerc	Mumbai Falcons India Racing	1	4	9	1	218	Race 13 of 15	60

=== Teams' ===
Season	Team	Poles	Wins	Podiums	Fastest laps	Points	Clinched	Margin
2018	(United Kingdom) Dragon Hitech GP	6	11	20	18	484	Race 12 of 15	215
2019	(United Kingdom) Dragon Hitech GP	8	13	28	12	376	Race 13 of 15	197
2019–20	(Hong Kong) BlackArts Racing Team	0	6	14	4	386	Race 15 of 15	29
2021	(United Arab Emirates) Abu Dhabi Racing by Prema	5	4	16	5	383	Race 15 of 15	98
2022	Mumbai Falcons India Racing	4	7	18	5	348	Race 13 of 15	84

=== Masters Cup ===
Season	Driver	Team	Poles	Wins (Masters)	Podiums	Fastest laps	Points (Masters)	Clinched	Margin
2018	(China) Yin Hai Tao	(China) Zen-Motorsport	0	0 (6)	0	0	15 (276)	Race 13 of 15	83
2019	(Hong Kong) Paul Wong	(Hong Kong) 852 Challengers	0	0 (7)	0	0	3 (313)	Race 15 of 15	152
2019–20	(Hong Kong) Thomas Luedi (Note: Luedi is a Swiss driver who raced under a license from Hong Kong.)	(Hong Kong) BlackArts Racing Team	0	0 (8)	0	0	3 (254)	Race 15 of 15	23
2022	(United Arab Emirates) Khaled Al Qubaisi	(United Arab Emirates) Abu Dhabi Racing by Prema	0	0(8)	0	0	0(287)	Race 14 of 15	26

=== Rookie Cup ===
Season	Driver	Team	Poles	Wins (rookie)	Podiums	Fastest laps	Points (rookie)	Clinched	Margin
2021	(Japan) Ayumu Iwasa	(United Kingdom) Hitech Grand Prix	0	0 (2)	1	0	81 (226)	Race 15 of 15	8
2022	(Spain) Pepe Martí	(Republic of Ireland) Pinnacle Motorsport	0	0(10)	5	2	158(298)	Race 12 of 15	131

== Winter series champions ==
=== Drivers' ===
Season	Driver	Team	Poles	Wins	Podiums	Fastest laps	Points	Clinched	Margin
2019	(Netherlands) Rinus VeeKay	(United Kingdom) Dragon Hitech GP	2	4	8	4	184	Race 9 of 9	29

=== Teams' ===
Season	Team	Poles	Wins	Podiums	Fastest laps	Points	Clinched	Margin
2019	(United Kingdom) Dragon Hitech GP	4	4	14	4	316	Race 9 of 9	94

=== Masters Cup ===
Season	Driver	Team	Poles	Wins (Masters)	Podiums	Fastest laps	Points (Masters)	Clinched	Margin
2019	(Japan) Tairoku Yamaguchi	(Japan) B-Max Racing Team	0	0 (5)	0	0	7 (143)	Race 6 of 9	27

== Circuits ==
- Italic denotes a circuit will be used in the 2027 season.

Number	Circuits	Rounds	Years
1	(United Arab Emirates) Dubai Autodrome	6 (Note: Dubai Autodrome hosted 3 rounds in 2022, 2 rounds in 2021.)	2020–2022
1	(United Arab Emirates) Yas Marina Circuit	6 (Note: Yas Marina Circuit hosted 3 rounds in 2021, 2 rounds in 2022.)	2020–2022
3	(Malaysia) Sepang International Circuit	5 (Note: Sepang International Circuit hosted 2 rounds in 2018 and 2019–20 seasons, and it will host 2 rounds in 2027 season.)	2018–2020, 2027
4	(China) Shanghai International Circuit	3 (Note: Shanghai International Circuit hosted 2 rounds in 2019.)	2018–2019, 2027
5	(China) Ningbo International Circuit	2 (Note: Ningbo International Circuit hosted 2 rounds in 2018.)	2018
5	(Thailand) Chang International Circuit	2	2019–2020
7	(Japan) Suzuka International Racing Course	1	2019
8	(China) Zhuhai International Circuit	0	2027
8	(South Korea) Inje Speedium	0 (Note: Inje Speedium will host 2 rounds in 2027 season.)	2027
