= Joey Alders =

Dutch racing driver (born 1999)

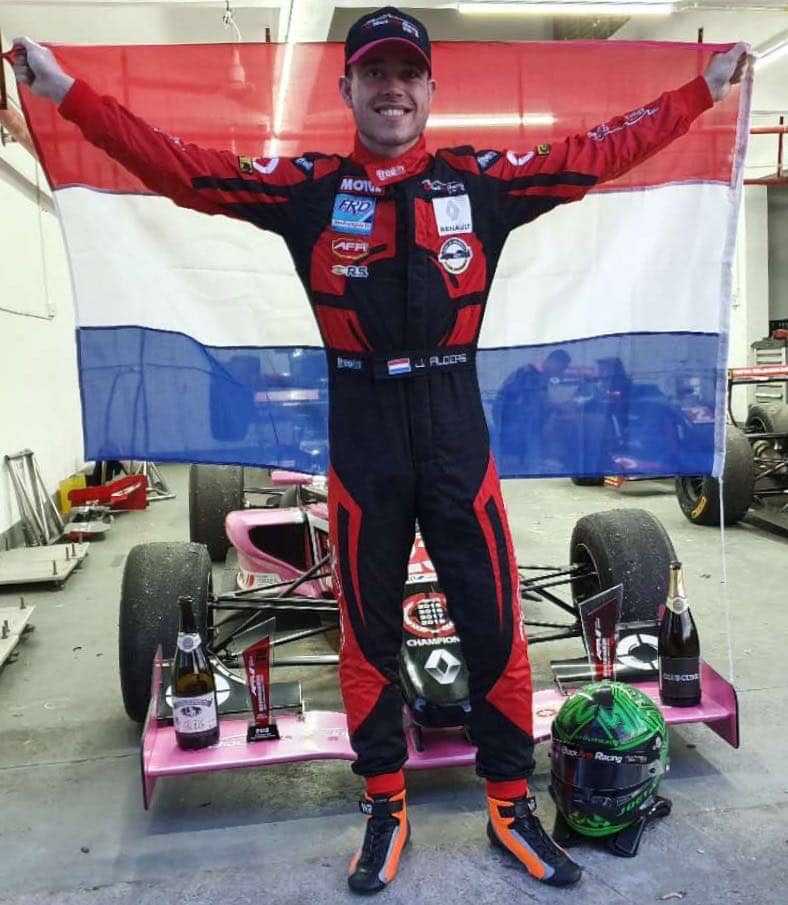
- Alders in 2019
- Nationality: (Netherlands) Dutch
- Born: 6 August 1999 (age 27) Anna Paulowna, The Netherlands

European Le Mans Series career
- Debut season: 2021
- Current team: Eurointernational
- Categorisation: FIA Gold
- Car number: 11
- Starts: 3
- Wins: 0
- Podiums: 1
- Poles: 0
- Fastest laps: 0

Previous series
- 2020 2019-20 2019 2018: Formula Renault Eurocup; F3 Asian Championship; Asian Formula Renault Series; ADAC Formula 4 Championship

Championship titles
- 2019-20 2019: F3 Asian Championship; Asian Formula Renault Series

Joey Alders (born 6 August 1999) is a Dutch racing driver from Den Helder. He won the Asian Formula Renault Series championship and the Asian Formula 3 championship. He won both single-seater championships in his debut year and competed in the 2021 European Le Mans Series in the Eurointernational LMP3.

== Career ==
=== Karting ===
Alders started karting in 2009 in The Netherlands at the age of ten, where he raced a string of successful campaigns, which included winning the Dutch Championship Academy in 2012.

=== ADAC Formula 4 Championship ===
In 2018, Alders made his single-seater debut in the ADAC F4 championship with Van Amersfoort Racing. Alders' highest finish was at the second race at Hockenheimring where he finished fifth, at the end of the season he finished 11th with 44 points.

=== Asian Formula Renault Series ===
Alders tested for and moved to BlackArts Racing for the 2019 Asian Formula Renault Series. Alders finished on the podium ten times, eight of which were race victories. Alders won the championship with 314 points, 49 points ahead of runner up Bruno Carneiro.

=== F3 Asian Championship ===
After his performance in the Asian Formula Renault series, BlackArts Racing kept Alders to race in the F3 Asian Championship. On the 13 December 2019, the season kicked off at Sepang International Circuit where Alders won two of the three rounds. Alders would go on to win three more races and get a total of 11 podiums. In the final rounds, three drivers could still win the title, with those being Jack Doohan, Nikita Mazepin and Alders. On the first race of the final round in Thailand, Doohan was leading the race ahead of Alders until a late puncture caused Doohan to limp to the end and finished eighth where Alders inherited the win. Alders won the championship with 266 points.

=== Formula Renault ===
Alders tested with MP Motorsport in the pre-season test at Monza. Due to the disruption caused by the COVID-19 pandemic, the preseason test immediately preceded the first round of the championship. It was later confirmed that Alders would contest the season with MP Motorsport.

== Racing record ==
=== Career summary ===
Season	Series	Team	Races	Wins	Poles	F/Laps	Podiums	Points	Position
2018	ADAC Formula 4 Championship	Van Amersfoort Racing	20	0	0	0	0	44	11th
2019	Asian Formula Renault Series	BlackArts Racing	12	8	11	8	10	314	**1st**
2019	F3 Asian Winter Series	BlackArts Racing	3	0	0	0	0	0	NC†
2019–20	F3 Asian Championship	BlackArts Racing	15	5	0	3	11	266	**1st**
2020	Formula Renault Eurocup	MP Motorsport	4	0	0	1	0	1	19th
2021	European Le Mans Series - LMP3	Eurointernational	3	0	0	0	1	19.5	17th

^{†} As Alders was a guest driver, he was ineligible to score points.
^{*} Season still in progress.

=== Complete ADAC Formula 4 Championship results ===
(key) (Races in bold indicate pole position; races in italics indicate points for the fastest lap)

Year	Team	1	2	3	4	5	6	7	8	9	10	11	12	13	14	15	16	17	18	19	20	DC	Points
2018	Van Amersfoort Racing	OSC; 1 Ret	OSC; 2; 11	OSC; 3; 6	HOC; 1 Ret	HOC; 2; 5	HOC; 3; 11	LAU; 1 Ret	LAU; 2; 8	LAU; 3; 14	RBR; 1; 11	RBR; 2 Ret	RBR; 3; 10	HOC; 1; 9	HOC; 2; 6	NÜR; 1 Ret	NÜR; 2; 10	NÜR; 3 Ret	HOC; 1; 9	HOC; 2; 10	HOC; 3; 15	11th	44

=== Complete Asian Formula Renault Series results ===
(key) (Races in bold indicate pole position; races in italics indicate points for the fastest lap)

Year	Team	1	2	3	4	5	6	7	8	9	10	11	12	DC	Points
2019	BlackArts Racing Team	**ZIC**; **1**; 8	**ZIC**; **2**; 4	**ZIC**; **1**; 1	**ZIC**; **2**; 2	**SEP**; **1**; 1	**SEP**; **2**; 1	**SEP**; **3**; 2	**SEP**; **1**; 1	**SEP**; **2**; 1	**SEP**; **3**; 1	**ZIC**; **1**; 1	ZIC; 2; 1	1st	314

=== Complete F3 Asian Championship results ===
(key) (Races in bold indicate pole position; races in italics indicate points for the fastest lap)

Year	Team	1	2	3	4	5	6	7	8	9	10	11	12	13	14	15	DC	Points
2019–20	BlackArts Racing Team	SEP; 1; 1	SEP; 2; 1	SEP; 3; 3	DUB; 1; 2	DUB; 2; 1	DUB; 3; 3	ABU; 1; 5	ABU; 2; 1	ABU; 3; 6	SEP; 1; 2	SEP; 2; 8	SEP; 3; 2	CHA; 1; 1	CHA; 2; 3	CHA; 3; 7	1st	266

=== Complete Formula Renault Eurocup results ===
(key) (Races in bold indicate pole position) (Races in italics indicate fastest lap)

Year	Team	1	2	3	4	5	6	7	8	9	10	11	12	13	14	15	16	17	18	19	20	Pos	Points
2020	MP Motorsport	MNZ; 1 Ret	MNZ; 2; 10	IMO; 1; 13	IMO; 2; 17	NÜR; 1	NÜR; 2	MAG; 1	MAG; 2	ZAN; 1	ZAN; 2	CAT; 1	CAT; 2	SPA; 1	SPA; 2	IMO; 1	IMO; 2	HOC; 1	HOC; 2	LEC; 1	LEC; 2	19th	1

=== Complete European Le Mans Series results ===
Year	Entrant	Class	Chassis	Engine	1	2	3	4	5	6	Rank	Points
2021	Eurointernational	LMP3	Ligier JS P320	Nissan VK56DE 5.6L V8	CAT	RBR; 2	LEC; 10	MNZ; WD	SPA; 11	ALG	17th	19.5

Sporting positions
Preceded by Daniel Cao	Asian Formula Renault Series; Champion; 2019	Succeeded by Gerrard Xie
Preceded by Ukyo Sasahara	F3 Asian Championship; Champion; 2019-20	Succeeded by Zhou Guanyu
