= 2020 Macau Grand Prix =

67th running of the Macau Grand Prix

Race details
Date	22 November 2020
Official name	67th Macau Grand Prix – Formula 4 Macau Grand Prix
Location	Guia Circuit, Macau
Course	Temporary street circuit 6.120 km (3.803 mi)
Distance	Qualifying race 8 laps, 48.960 km (30.422 mi); Main race 12 laps, 73.440 km (45.634 mi)
Weather	Qualifying race: Dry and clear Main race: Dry and clear
- Qualifying race
Pole driver	Hon Chio Leong (MAC)	Smart Life Racing Team

Podium
First	Hon Chio Leong (MAC)	Smart Life Racing Team
Second	Wing Chung Chang (MAC)	Chengdu Tianfu International Circuit Team
Third	Li Sicheng (CHN)	LEO Geeke Team
- Main race
Pole driver	Hon Chio Leong (MAC)	Smart Life Racing Team

Podium
First	Hon Chio Leong (MAC)	Smart Life Racing Team
Second	Wing Chung Chang (MAC)	Chengdu Tianfu International Circuit Team
Third	Li Sicheng (CHN)	LEO Geeke Team

The 2020 Macau Grand Prix was a Formula 4 (F4) car race that took place on the streets of Macau on 22 November 2020. Because of strict Chinese quarantine regulations brought on by the COVID-19 pandemic, the race became an F4 event (rather than Formula Three) for the first time in 37 years and was part of the Fédération Internationale de l'Automobile (FIA)-administered China Formula 4 Championship. The event featured two races: an eight-lap qualifying race to set the grid for the twelve-lap main event. The 2020 Macau Grand Prix was the race's 67th running, the first for F4 cars, and the final meeting of the three-round 2020 F4 Chinese Championship.

Hon Chio Leong of Smart Life Racing Team won the Grand Prix from pole position after winning the qualification race the day before. Leong was the first Macau driver to win the Macau Grand Prix since André Couto in the 2000 race, and the third overall. Wing Chung Chang of the Chengdu Tianfu International Circuit Team finished second, and the podium was completed by the highest-placed Chinese driver, Li Sicheng of the LEO Geeke Team, who finished third. The race results earned He Zijian the Drivers' Championship and the LEO Geeke Team the Teams' Cup.

== Background ==
The Macau Grand Prix, Macau's most prestigious international sporting event, is an annual auto race which is considered a stepping stone to higher motor-racing categories such as Formula One. The 2020 Macau Grand Prix was the 67th edition of the event, and its first running under Formula 4 regulations. It was held on the temporary 6.2-kilometre (3.9 mi) Guia Circuit in the streets of Macau on 22 November 2020 with two preceding days of practice and qualifying.

2020 Macau Grand Prix

After the event was held as a non-championship round of the FIA Formula 3 Championship for the first time in 2019, the series was due to return for a second year. With quarantine restrictions introduced due to the COVID-19 pandemic, however, the plan was abandoned by the Macau Grand Prix Organizing Committee in early September; Euroformula Open and Super Formula Lights cars complying with Formula 3 regulations could not compete in Macau. Since Macau had imposed a 14-day quarantine for overseas visitors, most drivers came from Hong Kong, Macau and China. The 2020 race was part of the Fédération Internationale de l'Automobile (FIA)-administered China Formula 4 Championship, featuring Mygale cars powered by a 2.0 L (2,000 cc) Geely G-Power JLD-4G20 engine, and was the last of three meetings of the 2020 season.

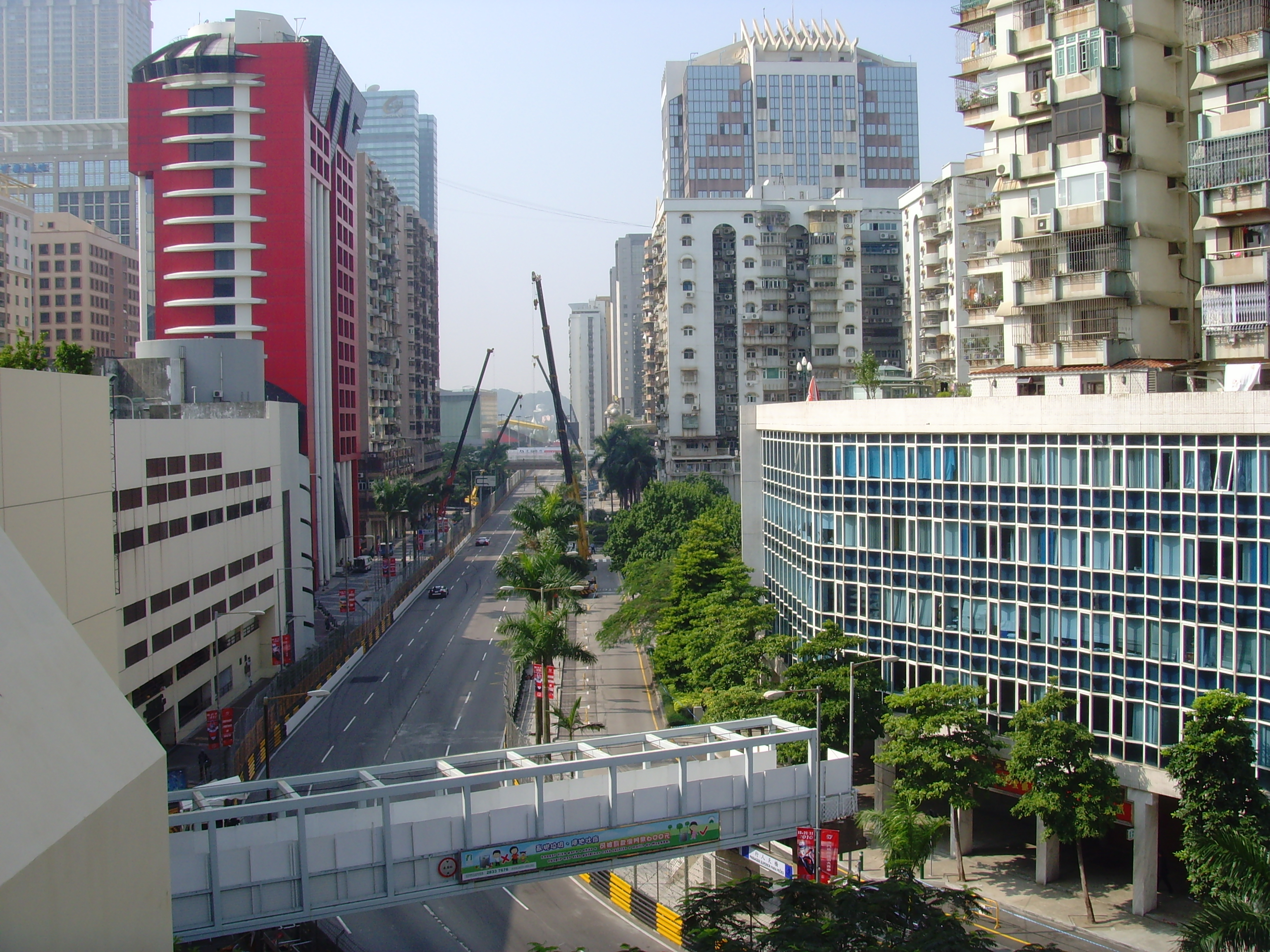
The Guia Circuit, where the race was held

After the second Zhuhai International Circuit meeting a month earlier, Smart Life Racing Team driver He Zijian led the Drivers' Championship with 169 points (ahead of Stephen Hong of FFA Racing and Leo Geeke Team's Li Sicheng in second and third places with 78 points each). Pointer Racing driver James Wong was fourth with 75 points, and BlackArts Racing Team competitor Zhu Yuanjie was fifth with 64 points. In the Teams' Cup, Smart Life Racing Team led with 175 points; Leo Geeke Team was second with 119 points, and Black Arts Racing Team was third with 115. FFA Racing and Pointer Racing were in fourth and fifth place with 109 and 75 points, respectively.

Drivers 15 years of age or older were invited to compete by Macau's governing body, the Associação Geral Automóvel de Macau-China, and entries had to be filed between 17 August and 11 September 2020. The entry list of 17 drivers was released on 4 November; it featured local drivers Hon Chio Leong, Wing Chung Chang and Drivers' Championship leader He. Wong moved from Henmax Motorsport to replace Cheng Tao at Leo Geeke Team, and Hong joined Asia Racing Team from FFA Racing. The Grand Prix was originally scheduled to use a rolling start (a change to the series' regulations), but the plan was abandoned on 19 November in favour of a standing start in line with China Formula 4 Championship meetings. Double championship points were awarded for the qualifying and main races.

== Practice ==
There were two 35-minute practice sessions preceding the race on 20 November: one in mid-morning, and the second later that afternoon. The first practice session took place in clear weather. Li Sicheng lapped fastest (with three minutes remaining), with a time of 2 minutes, 34.106 seconds before improving to two minutes, 33.209 seconds on his final lap; he was 1.281 seconds ahead of Chang in second position. Positions three through five were held by He, Chao Yin Wei and Ling Kang. No major incidents occurred during the session. Conditions continued to be clear for the second practice session. Leong set the fastest lap time early in the session at 2 minutes, 33.466 seconds before improving to two minutes, 30.893 seconds midway through. He later improved to two minutes, 30.168 seconds, with ten minutes remaining, to conclude the session fastest. Chang was second-fastest, ahead of Li, Ling and He. Soon after Leong lapped fastest, Zhu collided with the barrier at the right-hand Faraway Hill corner in the track's mountain section, prompting officials to end the session with eight minutes to go.

== Qualifying ==
The 20-minute qualifying session on the morning on 21 November determined the qualification race's starting order with each driver's fastest lap times. Drivers who were outside 110 percent of the fastest lap time in their category would not qualify for the event. Conditions were dry for the session. Cheng was the early pacesetter before He led with a 2-minute, 31.970-second time which Leong would improve to 2 minutes, 29.794 seconds. Yellow flags waved during the final minutes of the session, which prevented any improvement from Leong; however, his time was fast enough for pole position. Leong was joined on the grid's front row by Li: the highest-ranked driver eligible to score championship points, since Leong was a previous China Formula 4 Championship winner. Li's time demoted Chang to third place, with Ling moving to fourth in the qualifier's final six minutes; the drivers were separated by less than a second. He qualified fifth, with Kit, Junjie Lu, Yang Liu, Wei and Zong Yi Shang placing seventh through tenth. Yucheng Zeng, Zhu, Jing Zefeng, Weifu Huang, Hui Zheng, Ying Fu Hon and Song Tao Yu, in 11th through 17th place, were the final qualifying drivers. The session was disrupted when Hui lost control of his car on the main straight before Hong ran deep onto the run-off area at the Lisboa turn during his final lap.

=== Qualifying classification ===
Bold time indicates the faster of the three times that determined the starting order for the qualification race.

Qualifying results
Pos	No.	Driver	Team	Q1 time	Q2 time	Q3 time	Gap	Grid
1	2	Hon Chio Leong (MAC)	Smart Life Racing Team	2:39.341	2:30.168	2:29.794	—	1
2	32	Li Sicheng (CHN)	LEO Geeke Team	2:33.209	2:32.629	2:30.607	+0.813	2
3	28	Wing Chung Chang (MAC)	Chengdu Tianfu International Circuit Team	2:34.490	2:31.784	2:31.026	+1.232	3
4	24	Kang Ling (CHN)	BlackArts Racing Team	2:39.223	2:34.253	2:32.010	+2.216	4
5	22	He Zijian (CHN)	Smart Life Racing Team	2:37.316	2:36.444	2:32.943	+3.149	5
6	3	Lo Kwan Kit (HKG)	Pointer Racing	2:39.427	2:36.757	2:33.498	+3.704	6
7	17	Hong Shi Jie (CHN)	Asia Racing Team	2:40.448	2:40.970	2:34.236	+4.442	7
8	8	Yang Liu (CHN)	Yang Liu	2:39.304	2:36.962	2:35.950	+6.156	8
9	23	Chao Yin Wei (CHN)	GRID Motorsport	2:39.210	2:38.139	2:36.434	+6.640	9
10	33	Shang Zong Yi (CHN)	Team KRC	2:50.597	2:44.544	2:39.396	+9.602	10
11	21	Yu Cheng Zeng (HKG)	Champ Motorsport	2:49.162	2:44.463	2:40.173	+10.379	11
12	11	Zhu Yuan Jie (CHN)	BlackArts Racing Team	2:40.493	2:43.943	2:41.246	+10.699	12
13	56	Jing Ze Feng (CHN)	Team KRC	2:49.220	2:42.607	2:41.467	+11.673	13
14	48	Wai Fu Wong (CHN)	Leo Geeke Team	2:47.445	2:47.412	2:45.485	+15.691	14
15	95	Hui Zheng (CHN)	Hui Zheng	3:01.905	—	2:49.164	+19.370	15
16	61	Hon Ying Fu (HKG)	Henmax Motorsport	3:03.202	3:04.520	—	+33.408	16
17	26	Song Tao Yu (CHN)	Asia Racing Team	3:34.241	3:29.873	3:07.753	+37.959	17

== Qualifying race ==
The eight-lap qualifying race to determine the starting order for the main event began at 14:20 p.m. on 21 November; conditions were dry. Leong maintained his pole position advantage heading into Lisboa corner. Li and Chang were alongside each other on the straight, with Chang overtaking Li at the Mandarin Oriental Bend turn. Liu moved from eighth to fourth during the first lap; Kwan fell from sixth to ninth, and Chao improved from ninth to eighth. Leong held a 1.654-second gap over Chang to start the second lap, as Ling began duelling He for fourth place. Zeng crashed during the second lap in the mountainous area of the circuit and created a brief blockage which necessitated the safety car, since Huang could not restart his vehicle and required assistance from the marshal to push start his car. Jing retired during the safety-car period when he stopped at the Melco hairpin, creating a brief 13-car blockage until his vehicle was removed from the road. The safety car was withdrawn at the end of the fourth lap as Zhu and Hong made contact when racing was about to resume. Hong resumed, as the top section of Zhu's front wing was removed.

Li attempted to overtake Chang towards the Lisboa corner but decided to bow out of the manoeuvre. The safety car was dispatched for the second time on the fifth lap. Hui crashed at high speed into the guardrail on the Solitude Esses, and the resulting cleanup lasted until the seventh lap. The race was restarted on the final lap, with Leong leading Chang. Through the Mandarin Bend Oriental corner, Chang was close behind Leong and attempted to pass him on the outside when Leong turned inside. Chang drew alongside Leong (braking at the Lisboa corner), but Leong kept the lead. On the final lap, Wei, He and Ling were involved in separate crashes into the left-hand barrier. Leong maintained the lead for the remainder of the event to claim victory and pole position for the main race. He was the first Macau driver to win a single-seater motor race in Macau since Cheong Lou Meng finished first in the 2004 Formula Renault undercard round. Chang was 0.867 seconds later in second place, with Li another 1.4 seconds behind in third. Liu was in fourth place, Zong fifth, Hong sixth, Zhu seventh, Lu eighth, Wong ninth and Yingfu tenth; He, Ling and Wei were the final classified finishers. Despite his accident, He took the Drivers' Championship with one race to go.

=== Qualification race classification ===
Qualification race result
Pos	No.	Driver	Team	Laps	Time/Retired	Grid
1	2	(Macau) Hon Chio Leong	Smart Life Racing Team	8	29:59.45	1
2	28	(Macau) Wing Chung Chang	Chengdu Tianfu International Circuit Team	8	+0.867	3
3	32	(China) Li Sicheng	LEO Geeke Team	8	+2.334	2
4	8	(China) Yang Liu	Yang Liu	8	+4.515	8
5	33	(China) Shang Zong Yi	Team KRC	8	+13.125	10
6	17	(China) Hong Shi Jie	Asia Racing Team	8	+17.490	7
7	11	(China) Yuan Jie Zhu	BlackArts Racing Team	8	+20.531	12
8	48	(China) Wai Fu Wong	LEO Geeke Team	8	+32.913	14
9	3	(Hong Kong) Lo Kwan Kit	Pointer Racing	8	+51.293	6
10	61	(Hong Kong) Hon Ying Fu	Henmax Motorsport	8	+52.472	16
11	22	(China) He Zijian	Smart Life Racing Team	8	+1 Lap	5
12	24	(China) Kang Ling	BlackArts Racing Team	8	+1 Lap	4
13	23	(China) Chao Yin Wei	GRID Motorsport	8	+1 Lap	9
NC	95	(China) Hui Zheng	Hui Zheng	3	+5 Laps	15
NC	21	(Hong Kong) Yu Cheng Zeng	Champ Motorsport	2	+6 Laps	11
NC	56	(China) Jing Ze Feng	Team KRC	1	+7 Laps	13
NC	26	(China) Song Tao Yu	Asia Racing Team	0	+8 Laps	17
Fastest Lap: Hon Chio Leong, 2:29.494, 147.3 km/h (91.5 mph) on Lap 2

== Main race ==
The twelve-lap main race began in sunny weather at 15:30 local time on 22 November. Leong took the lead at the start of the race, weaving on the main straight to keep Chang in second position going into the Mandarin Oriental Bend turn. Chang slipstreamed, drawing closer to Leong into the Lisboa corner as Liu overtook Li on the inside for third place on the turn. The safety car was deployed on the first lap when Liu crashed into the right-side barrier on the track's mountain section (cresting the Faraway Hill corner), since his car needed to be removed. Yu went into a run-off area, and retired from the race as well. The safety car was withdrawn at the end of the third lap, and racing resumed with Leong in the lead. On the fifth lap, Lu tried to pass Hong on the Mandarin Oriental Bend but Hong held onto fourth place on the inside; Shang was passed for seventh place by Ling on that lap. Yuan dropped from sixth to tenth place on the sixth lap as Shang overtook him on the main straight and He passed Yuan at the Lisboa corner. Hong blocked a passing attempt by Lo for fourth place going into the Lisboa corner on lap seven. Hong and Lu were alongside each other later in the lap, but Hong held onto fourth place.

Hong and Lo's battle for fourth place enabled Ling to gain on both drivers and join the duel on the eighth lap. On lap ten, Lo passed Hong on the inside for fourth place at the Mandarin Oriental Bend. Ling tried to pass Hong cresting San Francisco Hill, but was hampered by slower cars. Ling drew alongside Hong at the Reservoir Bend to start lap 11, but decided not to pass him on the Mandarin Oriental Bend. Chang had cut Leong's three-second lead to 0.723 seconds during the lap 11 when they encountered slower cars. On the final lap, a lapped car on San Francisco Hill delayed Leong enough for Chang to catch up. On his third attempt, Leong won the race in 36 minutes, 38.984 seconds. He was the first driver from Macau to win the Macau Grand Prix since André Couto in 2000, and the third in race history. Chang finished second, 0.513-second behind, and Li was 23 seconds later in third for the event's first all-Asian podium since 1971. The final 15 classified finishers were Lu, Hong, Ling, He, Shang, Zhu, Wei, Jing, Weifu, Zheng, Zeng and Hon. The race gave Huang the Masters' Cup, with Li taking Rookie of the Year honours and Leo Geeke Team winning the Teams' Cup.

=== Main race classification ===
Main race result
Pos	No.	Driver	Team	Laps	Time/Retired	Grid
1	2	(Macau) Hon Chio Leong	Smart Life Racing Team	12	36:38.984	1
2	28	(Macau) Wing Chung Chang	Chengdu Tianfu International Circuit Team	12	+0.513	2
3	32	(China) Li Sicheng	LEO Geeke Team	12	+23.739	3
4	3	(Hong Kong) Lo Kwan Kit	Pointer Racing	12	+40.657	9
5	17	(China) Hong Shi Jie	Asia Racing Team	12	+42.509	6
6	24	(China) Kang Ling	BlackArts Racing Team	12	+42.740	12
7	22	(China) He Zijian	Smart Life Racing Team	12	+52.153	11
8	33	(China) Shang Zong Yi	Team KRC	12	+56.021	10
9	11	(China) Zhu Yuan Jie	BlackArts Racing Team	12	+1:22.524	7
10	23	(China) Wei Chao Yin	GRID Motorsport	12	+1:24.179	12
11	56	(China) Jing Ze Feng	Team KRC	12	+1:25.510	17
12	48	(China) Wai Fu Wong	LEO Geeke Team	11	+1 Lap	8
13	95	(China) Hui Zheng	Hui Zheng	11	+1 Lap	14
14	21	(Hong Kong) Zeng Yu Cheng	Champ Motorsport	11	+1 Lap	15
15	61	(Hong Kong) Hon Ying Fu	Henmax Motorsport	11	+1 Lap	10
NC	8	(China) Yang Liu	Liu Yang	0	Retired	4
NC	26	(China) Song Tao Yu	Asia Racing Team	0	Retired	17
Fastest Lap: Wing Chung Chang, 2:29.530, 147.3 km/h (91.5 mph) on Lap 10

== After the race ==
The top three finishers appeared on the podium and at a later press conference. Leong said about his victory, "I just reached one of my childhood dreams, I’m a bit wordless I don't know how to describe what I’m feeling right now, I feel like I’m dreaming." He added, "I had a couple of cars blocking me through the mountain part [late in the race] and I was struggling quite a bit to get past them. In the end it was really, really close. I think I used my tyres a bit too quick at the start of the race. It was pretty tough." Leong acknowledged that residents were upset that the Grand Prix was held during the COVID-19 pandemic, but he felt it was important to demonstrate that Macau was safe for mainland Chinese visitors. Chang said about his second-place finish, "In the beginning I was trying to get closer, but Charles was so quick, I couldn't catch him. And then on the last lap I saw there was a slow car in front, and I thought I had a chance. But I'm really happy to finish second." Third-place finisher Li expressed gratitude for the opportunity to compete in the race, but admitted to feeling slightly nervous in the presence of the media. He concluded the race "was an excellent first experience."

He Zijian won the Drivers' Championship with 193 points, ahead of Chang (153 points) and Li (150). Hong finished the season in fourth place with 126 points, and Lo was fifth with 117. With 211 points, Leo Geeke Team finished the 2020 season first in the Teams' Cup competition. Smart Life Racing were in second place with 199 points, and the Chengdu Tianfu International Circuit Team placed third with 155. BlackArts Racing Team were in fourth place with 147 points, and Pointer Racing finished fifth with 117.

== Post-race standings ==
Drivers' Championship

+/–	Pos	Driver	Points
	1	(China) He Zijian	193
4	2	(Macau) Wing Chung Chang	153 (−40)
	3	(China) Li Sicheng	150 (−43)
6	4	(China) Hong Shi Jie	126 (−67)
1	5	(Hong Kong) Lo Kwan Kit	117 (−76)

Teams' Cup

+/–	Pos	Team	Points
1	1	(China) LEO Geeke Team	211
1	2	(China) Smart Life Racing Team	199 (−12)
3	3	(China) Chengdu Tianfu International Circuit Team	155 (−56)
1	4	(Hong Kong) BlackArts Racing Team	147 (−64)
	5	(China) Pointer Racing	117 (−94)

- Notes: Only the top five positions are included for both sets of standings.

== See also ==
- 2020 Macau Guia Race
