= 2019 F4 Chinese Championship =

Motor racing competition

Seasons
- ← 2018 2020 →

The 2019 F4 Chinese Championship (Shell Helix FIA F4 Chinese Championship) was the fifth season of the F4 Chinese Championship. It began on 12 April at the Shanghai International Circuit and finished on 28 September at the same place after one double-header and five triple-header rounds. The first round was run as a support event for the Chinese Grand Prix in Shanghai, for the Formula One World Championship, with the remaining five rounds co-hosted with the China Formula Grand Prix championship.

== Teams and Drivers ==
Teams	No.	Drivers	Rounds
(Hong Kong) BAR Motorsports	2	(China) Patrick Tsang	2
(Hong Kong) BAR Motorsports	18	(China) Lu Zhiwei	1
(Hong Kong) BAR Motorsports	99	(Macau) Nic Lai	1–2
(China) Star Racing Team	3	(China) Le Zhang	1, 5
(China) Star Racing Team	6	(China) Min Heng	1, 3
(China) X-Racing Team	5	(China) Shang Zongyi	2–6
(China) Freely Racing Team	7	(China) Xie Zhiyi	1–2
(China) Freely Racing Team	77	(China) He Xixi	1–2
(China) GEEKE team	8	(China) Yin Mingjie	2–3; 5-6
(China) GEEKE team	19	(Chinese Taipei) Lixin Peng	6
(China) GEEKE team	58	(China) Han Yuchao	5
(China) Smart Life Racing Team	9	(China) Lu Jingxi	3-6
(China) Smart Life Racing Team	13	(China) Lü Yiyu	1
(China) Smart Life Racing Team	22	(China) He Zijian	All
(China) Smart Life Racing Team	68	(China) Fan Gaoxiang	2
(China) Smart Life Racing Team	96	(China) Su Jiannan	5
(China) FFA Racing	10	(China) Liu Tiezheng	1, 3-6
(China) FFA Racing	17	(Canada) Maxx Ebenal	6
(China) FFA Racing	44	(China) Pang Changyuan	2
(China) FFA Racing	55	(China) Zhu Yuanjie	1–2
(China) FFA Racing	56	(China) Jing Zefeng	3-5
(Hong Kong) BlackArts Racing Team	11	(New Zealand) Conrad Clark	All
(Hong Kong) BlackArts Racing Team	14	(Hong Kong) Weiming Lin	6
(Hong Kong) BlackArts Racing Team	16	(China) Liu Zezhen	5
(Hong Kong) BlackArts Racing Team	18	(China) Lu Zhiwei	3
(Hong Kong) BlackArts Racing Team	66	(China) Eric Sun	1
(Hong Kong) BlackArts Racing Team	99	(Macau) Nic Lai	3
(China) Henmax Motorsport	28	(China) Ye Zhe	1
(China) Henmax Motorsport	61	(Hong Kong) Han Yingfu	All
(China) Karging League	33	(China) Ren Juncheng	1–2
(China) Karging League	88	(China) Lü Xinmin	1–3
(China) ZRT Team	95	(China) Lin Nan	1

== Race calendar and results ==
All rounds were held in China. For the first time the series supported the Formula 1 Chinese Grand Prix. The remaining events supported the China Formula Grand Prix championship and 2019 F3 Asian Championship.

Round		Circuit	Date	Pole position	Fastest lap	Winning driver	Winning team	Supporting
1	R1	Shanghai International Circuit, Shanghai	13 April	(China) Min Heng	(New Zealand) Conrad Clark	(New Zealand) Conrad Clark	(Hong Kong) BlackArts Racing Team	2019 Chinese Grand Prix
1	R2	Shanghai International Circuit, Shanghai	14 April		(New Zealand) Conrad Clark	(New Zealand) Conrad Clark	(Hong Kong) BlackArts Racing Team	2019 Chinese Grand Prix
2	R3	Zhuhai International Circuit, Zhuhai	3 May	(China) He Zijian	(New Zealand) Conrad Clark	(New Zealand) Conrad Clark	(Hong Kong) BlackArts Racing Team	China Formula Grand Prix
2	R4	Zhuhai International Circuit, Zhuhai	4 May		(New Zealand) Conrad Clark	(New Zealand) Conrad Clark	(Hong Kong) BlackArts Racing Team	China Formula Grand Prix
2	R5	Zhuhai International Circuit, Zhuhai	4 May		(China) He Zijian	(China) Shang Zongyi	(China) X-Racing Team	China Formula Grand Prix
3	R6	Ningbo International Circuit, Ningbo	13 July	(New Zealand) Conrad Clark	(New Zealand) Conrad Clark	(New Zealand) Conrad Clark	(Hong Kong) BlackArts Racing Team	China Formula Grand Prix
3	R7	Ningbo International Circuit, Ningbo	14 July		(New Zealand) Conrad Clark	(New Zealand) Conrad Clark	(Hong Kong) BlackArts Racing Team	China Formula Grand Prix
3	R8	Ningbo International Circuit, Ningbo	14 July		(New Zealand) Conrad Clark	(New Zealand) Conrad Clark	(Hong Kong) BlackArts Racing Team	China Formula Grand Prix
4	R9	Qinhuangdao Shougang Racing Valley, Qinhuangdao	17 August	(China) He Zijian	(China) He Zijian	(New Zealand) Conrad Clark	(Hong Kong) BlackArts Racing Team	China Formula Grand Prix
4	R10	Qinhuangdao Shougang Racing Valley, Qinhuangdao	18 August		(New Zealand) Conrad Clark	(New Zealand) Conrad Clark	(Hong Kong) BlackArts Racing Team	China Formula Grand Prix
4	R11	Qinhuangdao Shougang Racing Valley, Qinhuangdao	18 August		(China) He Zijian	(New Zealand) Conrad Clark	(Hong Kong) BlackArts Racing Team	China Formula Grand Prix
5	R12	Shanghai International Circuit, Shanghai	7 September	(New Zealand) Conrad Clark	(China) He Zijian	(New Zealand) Conrad Clark	(Hong Kong) BlackArts Racing Team	2019 F3 Asian Championship; China Formula Grand Prix
5	R13	Shanghai International Circuit, Shanghai	8 September		(New Zealand) Conrad Clark	(New Zealand) Conrad Clark	(Hong Kong) BlackArts Racing Team	2019 F3 Asian Championship; China Formula Grand Prix
5	R14	Shanghai International Circuit, Shanghai	8 September		(New Zealand) Conrad Clark	(China) He Zijian	(China) Smart Life Racing Team	2019 F3 Asian Championship; China Formula Grand Prix
6	R15	Shanghai International Circuit, Shanghai	27 September	(New Zealand) Conrad Clark	(China) He Zijian	(China) He Zijian	(China) Smart Life Racing Team	Blancpain GT World Challenge Asia; 2019 F3 Asian Championship; China Formula Grand Prix
6	R16	Shanghai International Circuit, Shanghai	28 September		(China) He Zijian	(China) He Zijian	(China) Smart Life Racing Team	Blancpain GT World Challenge Asia; 2019 F3 Asian Championship; China Formula Grand Prix
6	R17	Shanghai International Circuit, Shanghai	28 September		(China) He Zijian	(China) Shang Zongyi	(China) X-Racing Team	Blancpain GT World Challenge Asia; 2019 F3 Asian Championship; China Formula Grand Prix

== Championship standings ==
Points were awarded as follows:

Position	**1st**	**2nd**	**3rd**	**4th**	**5th**	**6th**	**7th**	**8th**	**9th**	**10th**
Points	25	18	15	12	10	8	6	4	2	1

=== Drivers' Championship ===
Pos	Driver	SIC1		ZIC			NIC			QSV			SIC2			SIC3			Pts
1	(New Zealand) Conrad Clark	1	1	1	1	3	**1**	1	1	1	1	1	**1**	1	5	2	2	2	379
2	(China) He Zijian	3	6	**2**	4	2	2	2	2	**2**	2	2	2	3	1	1	1	3	302
3	(China) Shang Zongyi			3	3	1	3	3	5	DNS	3	3	4	5	2	4	4	1	214
4	(China) Lui Jingxi						5	4	4	3	6	5	9	7	6	7	5	4	112
5	(China) Liu Tiezheng	13	9				8	Ret	6	4	5	6	6	8	4	5	Ret	5	88
6	(China) Jing Zefeng						4	Ret	3	5	4	4	5	9	Ret				73
7	(China) Liu Zezhen												3	2	3				48
8	(China) Min Heng	**2**	2				6	Ret	Ret										44
9	(China) Fan Gaoxiang			4	2	4													42
10	(China) Zhu Yuanjie	5	7	7	5	5													42
11	(Hong Kong) Han Yingfu	17	16	11	10	Ret	11	9	10	6	7	7	10	11	9	9	7	8	40
12	(Canada) Maxx Ebenal															3	3	DNS	30
13	(China) Le Zhang	7	5										7	6	Ret				30
14	(China) Yin Mingjie			Ret	11	9	Ret	8	9				Ret	10	7	8	8	7	29
15	(China) Eric Sun	4	3																27
16	(China) He Xixi	8	4	5	Ret	Ret													26
17	(China) Xie Zhiyi	6	10	6	Ret	6													25
18	(Taiwan) Lixin Peng															6	6	6	24
19	(Macau) Nic Lai	14	11	9	9	7	7	6	Ret										24
20	(China) Lu Zhiwei	9	8				9	5	7										18
21	(China) Han Yuchao												8	4	10				17
22	(China) Lü Xinmin	12	14	10	7	Ret	10	7	8										11
23	(China) Pang Changyuan			12	6	11													8
24	(China) Ren Juncheng	11	DSQ	8	Ret	8													8
25	(China) Patrick Tsang			13	8	10													5
26	(China) Su Jiannan												Ret	12	8				4
27	(China) Zhe Ye	10	12																1
28	(China) Lin Nan	15	13																0
29	(China) Lü Yiyu	16	15																0
–	(Hong Kong) Weiming Lin															WD	WD	WD	0

Colour	Result
Gold	Winner
Silver	Second place
Bronze	Third place
Green	Points classification
Blue	Non-points classification
Blue	Non-classified finish (NC)
Purple	Retired, not classified (Ret)
Red	Did not qualify (DNQ)
Red	Did not pre-qualify (DNPQ)
Black	Disqualified (DSQ)
White	Did not start (DNS)
White	Withdrew (WD)
White	Race cancelled (C)
Blank	Did not practice (DNP)
Blank	Did not arrive (DNA)
Blank	Excluded (EX)

**Bold** – Pole
Italics – Fastest Lap

=== Teams' Cup ===
Pos	Team	Points
1	(Hong Kong) BlackArts Racing Team	479
2	(China) SMART LIFE RACING TEAM	477
3	(China) FFA RACING	241
4	(China) X Racing team	214
5	(China) FREELY RACING CLUB	118
6	(China) Star Racing team	74
7	(China) GEEKE team	70
8	(China) HENMAX MOTORSPORT	41
9	(China) Karging League	15
10	(Hong Kong) BAR MOTOSPORTS	11
11	(China) ZRT Team	0
