= 2020 TCR Middle East Touring Car Series =

The 2020 TCR Middle East season was set to be the fourth season of the TCR Middle East Series. The series was to be promoted by Creventic. The championship was set to start at Dubai Autodrome in Dubai on 9 January and end at Yas Marina Circuit in Abu Dhabi on 17 January.

The champion of the season would have been given a seat in a car in the second-running of the TCR Spa 500 event on the 1-3 of May.

The season was seemingly cancelled shortly before commencement.

== Race calendar ==
Round	Circuit	Date	Supporting
1	(United Arab Emirates) Dubai Autodrome, Dubai	9–10 January	Dubai 24 Hour; F3 Asian Championship
2	(United Arab Emirates) Dubai Autodrome, Dubai	9–10 January	Dubai 24 Hour; F3 Asian Championship
3	(United Arab Emirates) Dubai Autodrome, Dubai	9–10 January	Dubai 24 Hour; F3 Asian Championship
4	(United Arab Emirates) Yas Marina Circuit, Abu Dhabi	16–17 January	F3 Asian Championship
5	(United Arab Emirates) Yas Marina Circuit, Abu Dhabi	16–17 January	F3 Asian Championship
6	(United Arab Emirates) Yas Marina Circuit, Abu Dhabi	16–17 January	F3 Asian Championship

== Teams and drivers ==
- René Münnich and Luc Breukers were set to be on the entry list, however, the season was canceled.
