= 2020 F4 Chinese Championship =

Motor racing competition

Seasons
- ← 2019 2021 →

The 2020 F4 Chinese Championship (Shell Helix FIA F4 Chinese Championship) was the sixth season of the F4 Chinese Championship. It began on 19 September at the Zhuhai International Circuit and ended on 22 November at Guia Circuit as a part of the 2020 Macau Grand Prix.

== Teams and drivers ==
Teams	No.	Drivers	Status	Rounds
(China) Smart Life Racing Team	2	(Macau) Charles Leong	G	2–3
(China) Smart Life Racing Team	13	(China) Lü Yiyu	M	1
(China) Smart Life Racing Team	22	(China) He Zijian		All
(China) Pointer Racing	3	(Hong Kong) Allen Lo		All
(Hong Kong) BlackArts Racing Team	7	(China) Oscar Gao		1–2
(Hong Kong) BlackArts Racing Team	11	(China) Zhu Yuanjie		All
(Hong Kong) BlackArts Racing Team	24	(China) Ling Kang	G	3
(China) Ningbo International Circuit Team	8	(China) Liu Yang	G	3
(China) FFA Racing	10	(China) Liu Tiezheng		1–2
(China) FFA Racing	17	(China) Stephen Hong		1–2
(Hong Kong) Grid Motorsport	12	(China) Steven Bei		1–2
(Hong Kong) Grid Motorsport	23	(China) Neric Wei	G	2–3
(Macau) Asia Racing Team	17	(China) Stephen Hong		3
(Macau) Asia Racing Team	26	(China) Yu Songtao	M	All
(Macau) Asia Racing Team	44	(China) Pang Changyuan		1–2
(China) Champ Motorsport	21	(China) Zeng Yucheng		All
(China) LEO GEEKE Team	27	(China) Cheng Tao		1–2
(China) LEO GEEKE Team	32	(China) Li Sicheng		All
(China) LEO GEEKE Team	48	(Hong Kong) James Wong	M	3
(China) Chengdu Tianfu International Circuit Team	28	(Macau) Andy Chang		2–3
(China) Chengdu Tianfu International Circuit Team	95	(China) Zheng Hui	M	3
(China) SUNMAX Racing Team	33	(China) Shang Zongyi		3
(China) SUNMAX Racing Team	56	(China) Jing Zefeng		All
(China) Henmax Motorsport	48	(Hong Kong) James Wong	M	1–2
(China) Henmax Motorsport	61	(Hong Kong) Han Yingfu	M	3

Icon	Class
M	Drivers that compete for the Masters Championship
G	Guest drivers ineligible for Drivers' Championship

== Race calendar and results ==
The season was due to start on April 18-19 as a support series to 2020 Chinese Grand Prix but the event has been called off in view of the health concerns caused by COVID-19 pandemic. The calendar has been adjusted many times and the up to date version has been published on 2 September and features 3 round calendar with Round 1 and 2 taking place at Zhuhai International Circuit and the final stage to be announced. The confirmation of Guia Circuit as the place of the last competition was declared on 16 September. The races of the final round granted double points to the driver's championship.

Round		Circuit	Date	Pole position	Fastest lap	Winning driver	Winning team	Master class winner	Supporting
1	R1	(China) Zhuhai International Circuit, Zhuhai	19 September	(China) Stephen Hong (Note: He Zijian scored the fastest time in qualifying but had his time deleted. Gao Yujia scored the second-fastest time, but was issued a 3-place grid penalty. Hong Shijie inherited pole position.)	(China) He Zijian	(China) He Zijian (Note: Gao Yujia finished the first but was issued a 30 seconds penalty and a 3-place grid penalty for race 2 after the race, due to causing a collision with Hong Shijie. He Zijian inherited race win.)	(China) Smart Life Racing Team	(Hong Kong) James Wong	Zhuhai Motorsports; Association Club Race
1	R2	(China) Zhuhai International Circuit, Zhuhai	19 September		(China) Steven Bei	(China) Steven Bei	(Hong Kong) Grid Motorsport	(Hong Kong) James Wong	Zhuhai Motorsports; Association Club Race
1	R3	(China) Zhuhai International Circuit, Zhuhai	20 September	(China) He Zijian	(China) He Zijian	(China) He Zijian	(China) Smart Life Racing Team	(Hong Kong) James Wong	Zhuhai Motorsports; Association Club Race
1	R4	(China) Zhuhai International Circuit, Zhuhai	20 September		(China) He Zijian	(China) Stephen Hong	(China) FFA Racing	(Hong Kong) James Wong	Zhuhai Motorsports; Association Club Race
2	R5	(China) Zhuhai International Circuit, Zhuhai	7 October	(Macau) Charles Leong	(China) Stephen Hong	(Macau) Charles Leong	(China) Smart Life Racing Team	(Hong Kong) James Wong	Zhuhai Motorsports; Association Club Race
2	R6	(China) Zhuhai International Circuit, Zhuhai	7 October		(Macau) Charles Leong	(Macau) Charles Leong	(China) Smart Life Racing Team	(Hong Kong) James Wong	Zhuhai Motorsports; Association Club Race
2	R7	(China) Zhuhai International Circuit, Zhuhai	8 October	(Macau) Charles Leong	(Macau) Charles Leong	(Macau) Charles Leong	(China) Smart Life Racing Team	(China) Yu Songtao	Zhuhai Motorsports; Association Club Race
2	R8	(China) Zhuhai International Circuit, Zhuhai	8 October		(China) He Zijian	(Macau) Andy Chang	(China) Chengdu Tianfu International Circuit Team	(Hong Kong) James Wong	Zhuhai Motorsports; Association Club Race
3	R9	Guia Circuit, Macau	21 November	(Macau) Charles Leong	(Macau) Charles Leong	(Macau) Charles Leong	(China) Smart Life Racing Team	(Hong Kong) James Wong	Macau Grand Prix
3	R10	Guia Circuit, Macau	22 November	(Macau) Charles Leong	(Macau) Andy Chang	(Macau) Charles Leong	(China) Smart Life Racing Team	(Hong Kong) James Wong	Macau Grand Prix

== Championship standings ==
Points were awarded as follows:

Races	Position, points per race									
Races	**1st**	**2nd**	**3rd**	**4th**	**5th**	**6th**	**7th**	**8th**	**9th**	**10th**
Races 1–8	25	18	15	12	10	8	6	4	2	1
Races 9–10	50	36	30	24	20	16	12	8	4	2

=== Drivers' Championship ===
Pos	Driver	ZIC1				ZIC2				MAC		Pts
1	(China) He Zijian	1	2	**1**	2	4	2	2	2	11†	7	193
2	(Macau) Andy Chang					6	Ret	3	1	2	2	153
3	(China) Li Sicheng	2	3	3	DSQ	3	8	8	DSQ	3	3	150
4	(China) Stephen Hong	**Ret**	4	Ret	1	2	9	DSQ	4	6	5	126
5	(Hong Kong) Allen Lo	3	Ret	5	5	8	3	7	6	9	4	117
6	(China) Zhu Yuanjie	12	Ret	6	7	7	5	4	3	7	9	96
7	(Hong Kong) James Wong	7	6	8	9	11	6	12	8	8	12	56
8	(China) Steven Bei	6	1	2	Ret	Ret	DNS	DNS	DNS			51
9	(China) Oscar Gao	11	Ret	4	3	5	Ret	5	Ret			51
10	(China) Shang Zongyi									5	8	46
11	(China) Cheng Tao	4	DSQ	7	8	10	4	DSQ	Ret			41
12	(China) Jing Zefeng	Ret	5	Ret	4	14	Ret	DNS	5	Ret	11	40
13	(China) Liu Tiezheng	8	Ret	10	6	15	10	6	7			31
14	(China) Pang Changyuan	5	7	9	10	16	Ret	9	Ret			23
15	(China) Yu Songtao	13	9	13	13	13	7	11	9	Ret	Ret	13
16	(Hong Kong) Han Yingfu									10	15	8
17	(China) Lü Yiyu	9	8	12	12							6
18	(China) Zeng Yucheng	10	Ret	11	11	12	Ret	10	Ret	Ret	14	4
19	(China) Zheng Hui									Ret	13	2
Guest drivers ineligible to score points
	(Macau) Charles Leong					**1**	1	**1**	Ret	**1**	**1**	
	(China) Liu Yang									4	Ret	
	(China) Ling Kang									12†	6	
	(China) Neric Wei					9	Ret	DNS	DNS	13†	10	
Pos	Driver	ZIC1				ZIC2				MAC		Pts

Colour	Result
Gold	Winner
Silver	Second place
Bronze	Third place
Green	Points classification
Blue	Non-points classification
Blue	Non-classified finish (NC)
Purple	Retired, not classified (Ret)
Red	Did not qualify (DNQ)
Red	Did not pre-qualify (DNPQ)
Black	Disqualified (DSQ)
White	Did not start (DNS)
White	Withdrew (WD)
White	Race cancelled (C)
Blank	Did not practice (DNP)
Blank	Did not arrive (DNA)
Blank	Excluded (EX)

**Bold** – Pole
Italics – Fastest Lap
† — Did not finish, but classified

=== Teams' Cup ===
Pos	Team	Points
1	(China) LEO GEEKE Team	211
2	(China) Smart Life Racing Team	199
3	(China) Chengdu Tianfu International Circuit Team	155
4	(Hong Kong) BlackArts Racing Team	147
5	(China) Pointer Racing	117
6	(China) FFA Racing	109
7	(China) SUNMAX Racing Team	86
8	(Macau) Asia Racing Team	84
9	(Hong Kong) Grid Motorsport	51
10	(China) Henmax Motorsport	44
11	(China) Champ Motorsport	4
