= 2017 Japanese Formula 3 Championship =

The 2017 Japanese Formula 3 Championship was the 39th Japanese Formula 3 Championship season.

== Teams and drivers ==
Team	Chassis	Engine	No.	Driver	Status	Rounds
Corolla Chukyo Kuo TOM'S	Dallara F317	Toyota TOM'S TAZ31	1	(Japan) Sho Tsuboi		All
Corolla Chukyo Kuo TOM'S	Dallara F314	Toyota TOM'S TAZ31	36	(Japan) Ritomo Miyata		All
Toda Racing	Dallara F316	Toda TR-F301	2	(Japan) Hiroki Otsu		All
B-Max Racing Team	Dallara F312	Volkswagen A41 (0XY)	3	(Japan) Ai Miura		All
B-Max Racing Team	Dallara F314	Volkswagen A41 (0XY)	30	(Japan) "Dragon"		8–9
B-Max Racing Team	Dallara F306	Toyota TOM'S 3S-GE	13	(Japan) Motoyoshi Yoshida	N	All
B-Max Racing Team	Dallara F306	Toyota TOM'S 3S-GE	27	(Japan) "Syuji"	N	3, 7, 9
B-Max Racing Team	Dallara F306	Toyota TOM'S 3S-GE	30	(Japan) "Dragon"	N	1–7
B-Max Racing Team	Dallara F306	Toyota TOM'S 3S-GE	50	(Japan) Shinji Sawada	N	8
B-Max with Rn-Sports Yamashita Manufacturing	Dallara F308	Toyota TOM'S 3S-GE	11	(Japan) Masayuki Ueda	N	All
B-Max Racing Team with NDDP	Dallara F312	Volkswagen A41 (0XY)	23	(Japan) Mitsunori Takaboshi		All
Team KRC with B-Max	Dallara F315	Volkswagen A41 (0XY)	33	(China) Ye Hongli		1–8
Team KRC with B-Max	Dallara F315	Volkswagen A41 (0XY)	33	(China) Hong Shijie		9
HuaJiangHU Racing	Dallara F306	Toyota TOM'S 3S-GE	5	(China) Alex Yang	N	All
Hanashima Racing	Dallara F306	Toyota TOM'S 3S-GE	55	(Japan) Katsuaki Kubota	N	1–6, 9
Hanashima Racing	Dallara F308	Toyota TOM'S 3S-GE	55	(Japan) Takashi Fujii	N	7
Hanashima Racing	Dallara F308	Toyota TOM'S 3S-GE	55	(Japan) Yuya Motojima	N	8
HFDP Racing	Dallara F316	Toda TR-F301	7	(Japan) Sena Sakaguchi		All
Threebond with Drago Corse	Dallara F314	ThreeBond Tomei TB14F3	12	(Spain) Álex Palou		All
Albirex Racing Team	Dallara F315	Mercedes-Benz F3-414	21	(Brazil) Bruno Carneiro		All
Albirex Racing Team	Dallara F308	Toyota TOM'S 3S-GE	22	(Japan) Ryoya Hasegawa	N	1–7, 9
Tairoku Racing	Dallara F316	Volkswagen A41 (0XY)	28	(Japan) Tairoku Yamaguchi		All
CMS Motor Sports Project	Dallara F306	Toyota TOM'S 3S-GE	77	(Japan) Shigetomo Shimono	N	1–2
CMS Motor Sports Project	Dallara F306	Toyota TOM'S 3S-GE	77	(Japan) Makoto Hotta	N	4
CMS Motor Sports Project	Dallara F306	Toyota TOM'S 3S-GE	77	(Japan) Yuya Taira	N	7
CMS Motor Sports Project	Dallara F306	Toyota TOM'S 3S-GE	77	(Japan) Ryuichiro Ohtsuka	N	8
Okayama Kokusai Circuit RC	Dallara F315	Mercedes-Benz F3-414	78	(Japan) Yoshiaki Katayama		All

Icon	Class
N	National class.

== Race calendar and results ==
Calendar for the 2017 season.

Round		Circuit	Date	Pole position	Fastest lap	Winning driver	Winning team	National winner	Supporting
1	R1	Okayama International Circuit	1 April	(Spain) Álex Palou	(Japan) Mitsunori Takaboshi	(Japan) Mitsunori Takaboshi	B-Max Racing Team with NDDP	(Japan) "Dragon"	
1	R2	Okayama International Circuit	2 April	(Spain) Álex Palou	(Spain) Álex Palou	(Spain) Álex Palou	Threebond with Drago Corse	(Japan) Shigetomo Shimono	
1	R3	Okayama International Circuit	2 April		(Japan) Mitsunori Takaboshi	(Japan) Mitsunori Takaboshi	B-Max Racing Team with NDDP	(Japan) "Dragon"	
2	R1	Suzuka Circuit	22 April	(Japan) Mitsunori Takaboshi	(Japan) Mitsunori Takaboshi	(Japan) Mitsunori Takaboshi	B-Max Racing Team with NDDP	(Japan) Shigetomo Shimono	Super Formula
2	R2	Suzuka Circuit	23 April	(Japan) Mitsunori Takaboshi	(Japan) Mitsunori Takaboshi	(Japan) Mitsunori Takaboshi	B-Max Racing Team with NDDP	(Japan) Shigetomo Shimono	Super Formula
3	R1	Fuji Speedway	13 May	(Spain) Álex Palou	(Japan) Sho Tsuboi	(Spain) Álex Palou	Threebond with Drago Corse	(Japan) "Dragon"	
3	R2	Fuji Speedway	14 May	(Spain) Álex Palou	(Japan) Sho Tsuboi	(Japan) Mitsunori Takaboshi	B-Max Racing Team with NDDP	(Japan) Ryoya Hasegawa	
4	R1	Okayama International Circuit	27 May	(Japan) Mitsunori Takaboshi	(Japan) Mitsunori Takaboshi	(Japan) Mitsunori Takaboshi	B-Max Racing Team with NDDP	(Japan) "Dragon"	Super Formula
4	R2	Okayama International Circuit	28 May	(Spain) Álex Palou	(Japan) Ritomo Miyata	(Spain) Álex Palou	Threebond with Drago Corse	(Japan) Masayuki Ueda	Super Formula
5	R1	Suzuka Circuit	24 June	(Japan) Sho Tsuboi	(Japan) Mitsunori Takaboshi	(Japan) Sho Tsuboi	Corolla Chukyo Kuo TOM'S	(Japan) "Dragon"	Blancpain GT Asia
5	R2	Suzuka Circuit	25 June	(Japan) Sho Tsuboi	(Spain) Álex Palou	(Japan) Sho Tsuboi	Corolla Chukyo Kuo TOM'S	(Japan) "Dragon"	Blancpain GT Asia
6	R1	Fuji Speedway	8 July	(Japan) Sho Tsuboi	(Japan) Mitsunori Takaboshi	(Japan) Mitsunori Takaboshi	B-Max Racing Team with NDDP	(Japan) "Dragon"	Super Formula
6	R2	Fuji Speedway	9 July	(Japan) Sho Tsuboi	(Japan) Mitsunori Takaboshi	(Japan) Sho Tsuboi	Corolla Chukyo Kuo TOM'S	(Japan) "Dragon"	Super Formula
7	R1	Twin Ring Motegi	29 July	(Japan) Sho Tsuboi	(Japan) Mitsunori Takaboshi	(Japan) Sho Tsuboi	Corolla Chukyo Kuo TOM'S	(Japan) "Dragon"	
7	R2	Twin Ring Motegi	30 July	(Japan) Sho Tsuboi	(Japan) Sho Tsuboi	(Japan) Sho Tsuboi	Corolla Chukyo Kuo TOM'S	(Japan) Yuya Taira	
7	R3	Twin Ring Motegi	30 July		(Japan) Mitsunori Takaboshi	(Japan) Sho Tsuboi	Corolla Chukyo Kuo TOM'S	(Japan) Yuya Taira	
8	R1	Autopolis	9 September	(Japan) Sho Tsuboi	(Japan) Sho Tsuboi	(Japan) Sho Tsuboi	Corolla Chukyo Kuo TOM'S	(Japan) Yuya Motojima	Super Formula
8	R2	Autopolis	10 September	(Japan) Sho Tsuboi	(Japan) Mitsunori Takaboshi	(Japan) Sho Tsuboi	Corolla Chukyo Kuo TOM'S	(Japan) Yuya Motojima	Super Formula
9	R1	Sportsland SUGO	23 September	(Japan) Hiroki Otsu	(Japan) Ritomo Miyata	(Japan) Sho Tsuboi	Corolla Chukyo Kuo TOM'S	(Japan) Ryoya Hasegawa	Super Formula
9	R2	Sportsland SUGO	24 September	(Japan) Hiroki Otsu	(Spain) Álex Palou	(Japan) Hiroki Otsu	Toda Racing	(China) Alex Yang	Super Formula

== Championship standings ==
=== Drivers' Championships ===
- Points are awarded as follows:

1	2	3	4	5	6	PP	FL
10	7	5	3	2	1	1	1

==== Overall ====
Pos	Driver	OKA1			SUZ1		FUJ1		OKA2		SUZ2		FUJ2		MOT			AUT		SUG		Points
1	(Japan) Mitsunori Takaboshi	1	2	1	1	1	DSQ	1	1	4	3	3	1	2	2	2	2	3	3	4	4	148
2	(Japan) Sho Tsuboi	2	9	5	3	9	7	2	3	3	1	1	Ret	1	1	1	1	1	1	1	2	140
3	(Spain) Álex Palou	4	1	2	2	2	1	4	8	1	4	2	3	4	Ret	3	7	2	4	5	5	102
4	(Japan) Ritomo Miyata	3	3	3	DNS	DNS	5	3	2	2	2	4	6	5	4	8	4	4	2	2	3	79
5	(Japan) Hiroki Otsu	5	7	4	Ret	3	2	5	Ret	5	5	5	2	3	3	4	3	10	5	Ret	1	64
6	(Japan) Sena Sakaguchi	6	5	7	4	4	4	Ret	6	9	7	16	4	6	7	6	6	5	6	3	9	27
7	(China) Ye Hongli	8	4	6	6	8	3	10	5	8	6	9	7	7	Ret	9	9	11	14			13
8	(Japan) Ai Miura	9	Ret	9	5	6	9	6	4	6	10	7	5	8	Ret	7	10	7	8	8	6	11
9	(Japan) Yoshiaki Katayama	7	Ret	8	8	5	8	9	14	7	8	6	15	Ret	5	5	5	6	9	6	8	11
10	(Japan) Tairoku Yamaguchi	10	6	10	Ret	10	11	8	7	Ret	11	10	Ret	9	6	10	8	8	10	10	Ret	2
11	(Brazil) Bruno Carneiro	11	Ret	11	7	7	6	7	Ret	10	9	8	8	Ret	Ret	11	11	9	7	7	7	1
12	(Japan) "Dragon"	12	Ret	12	10	12	10	14	9	15	12	11	9	10	8	14	13	13	12	9	11	0
13	(Japan) Shigetomo Shimono	13	8	13	9	11																0
14	(Japan) Yuya Taira														9	12	12					0
15	(Japan) Masayuki Ueda	14	14	14	12	13	13	15	10	11	13	12	10	11	12	15	17	17	Ret	14	14	0
16	(Japan) Ryoya Hasegawa	16	10	15	11	14	12	11	Ret	12	15	13	12	13	Ret	16	16			12	Ret	0
17	(China) Alex Yang	17	12	16	15	16	15	12	12	13	14	17	11	12	10	13	15	16	16	15	12	0
18	(China) Hong Shijie																			11	10	0
19	(Japan) Katsuaki Kubota	15	11	Ret	13	15	14	13	11	14	17	15	13	14						13	13	0
20	(Japan) Yuya Motojima																	12	11			0
21	(Japan) Takashi Fujii														11	Ret	14					0
22	(Japan) Motoyoshi Yoshida	18	13	17	14	17	16	16	Ret	17	16	14	14	Ret	13	17	18	Ret	17	16	Ret	0
23	(Japan) Shinji Sawada																	14	13			0
24	(Japan) Makoto Hotta								13	16												0
25	(Japan) Ryuichirou Ohtsuka																	15	15			0
26	(Japan) "Syuji"						17	17							Ret	18	19			17	15	0
Pos	Driver	OKA1			SUZ1		FUJ1		OKA2		SUZ2		FUJ2		MOT			AUT		SUG		Points

==== National Class ====
Pos	Driver	OKA1			SUZ1		FUJ1		OKA2		SUZ2		FUJ2		MOT			AUT		SUG		Points
1	(Japan) "Dragon"	12	Ret	12	10	12	10	14	9	15	12	11	9	10	8	14	13					136
2	(Japan) Masayuki Ueda	14	14	14	12	13	13	15	10	11	13	12	10	11	12	15	17	17	Ret	14	14	92
3	(Japan) Ryoya Hasegawa	16	10	15	11	14	12	11	Ret	12	15	13	12	13	Ret	16	16			12	Ret	77
4	(China) Alex Yang	17	12	16	15	16	15	12	12	13	14	17	11	12	10	13	15	16	16	15	12	62
5	(Japan) Shigetomo Shimono	13	8	13	9	11																52
6	(Japan) Katsuaki Kubota	15	11	Ret	13	15	14	13	11	14	17	15	13	14						13	13	49
7	(Japan) Yuya Taira														9	12	12					29
8	(Japan) Yuya Motojima																	12	11			24
9	(Japan) Motoyoshi Yoshida	18	13	17	14	17	16	16	Ret	17	16	14	14	Ret	13	17	7	Ret	13	16	Ret	16
10	(Japan) Shinji Sawada																	14	13			14
11	(Japan) Ryuichirou Ohtsuka																	15	15			10
12	(Japan) Takashi Fujii														11	Ret	14					8
13	(Japan) "Syuji"						17	17							Ret	18	19			17	15	4
14	(Japan) Makoto Hotta								13	16												3
Pos	Driver	OKA1			SUZ1		FUJ1		OKA2		SUZ2		FUJ2		MOT			AUT		SUG		Points

=== Teams Championship ===
Pos.	Team	Points
1	Corolla Chukyo Kuo TOM'S	143
2	B-Max Racing Team with NDDP	134
3	ThreeBond Racing with Drago Corse	94
4	Toda Racing	62
5	HFDP Racing	27
6	B-Max Racing Team	21
7	Okayama Kokusai Circuit RC	40
8	Tairoku Racing	2
9	Albirex Racing Team	1
NC	Team KRC with B-Max	0
NC	HuaJiangHU Racing	0
NC	Hanashima Racing	0
NC	B-Max with Rn-Sports Yamashita Manufacturing	0
NC	CMS Motor Sports Project	0
Ref:

=== Engine tuner standings ===
Pos.	Engine tuner	Points
1	TOM'S	143
2	Siegfried Spiess Motorenbau GmbH	139
3	Tomei Engine	94
4	Toda Racing	75
5	HWA	12
