= Ling Kang =

Chinese racing driver (born 1997)

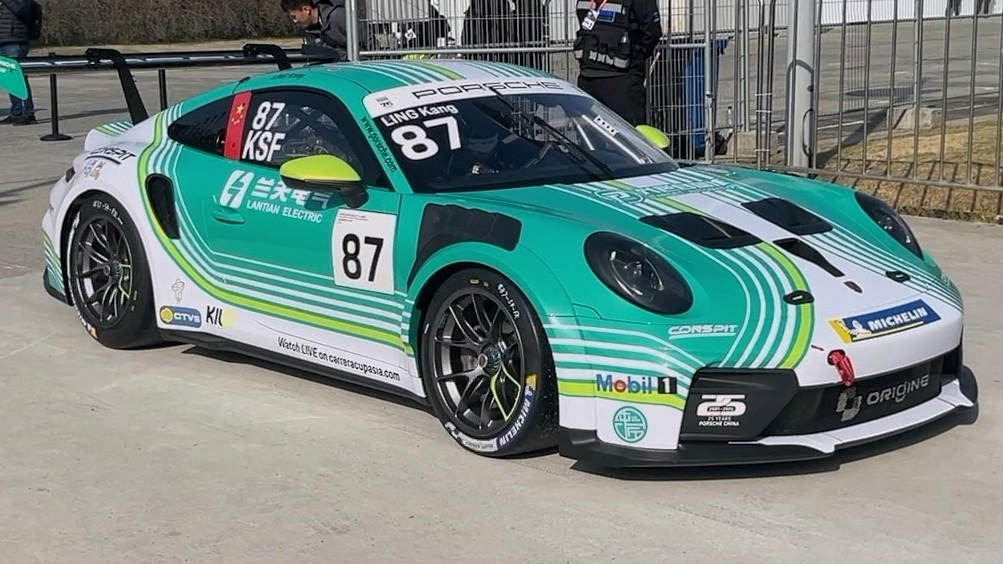
- Kang driving in the 2026 Porsche Carrera Cup Asia
- Nationality: (China) Chinese
- Born: 14 March 1997 (age 29) Changzhou, Jiangsu, China

European Formula 3 career
- Debut season: 2015
- Current team: kfzteile24 Mücke Motorsport
- Categorisation: FIA Silver
- Car number: 35
- Starts: 24
- Wins: 0
- Poles: 0
- Fastest laps: 0
- Best finish: 38th in 2015

Previous series
- 2014 2014 2014 2014 2013: GP3 Series; British Formula Three; Formula Renault 2.0 Alps; German Formula Three; French F4 Championship

Ling Kang (Chinese: 凌康; pinyin: Líng Kāng, born 14 March 1997) is a Chinese racing driver.

== Career ==
=== Karting ===
Ling began karting in 2010 and raced in Asia for the majority of his career, winning 2012 Asian Karting Championship x30 Senior class. Other highlights in his karting career include; a fourth-place finish in the 2010 KF3 Asia-Pacific Championship and 28th position in 2012 KF1 CIK-FIA World Karting Championship, scoring six points. He ended his karting career in 2012 and moved into single-seaters in 2013.

=== French F4 Championship ===
Ling made the step up into single-seaters in 2013, participating in the 2013 French F4 Championship, he scored four points, all of which came at the third round in Spa.

=== Formula Renault 2.0 Alps ===
In 2014, Ling signed for the Koiranen GP team to race in the 2014 Formula Renault 2.0 Alps championship, but left mid-season after scoring no points.

=== GP3 Series ===
Ling joined the Trident team in the GP3 Series for the final round of the season in the 2014 in Abu Dhabi. He replaced Luca Ghiotto in car number 23, and became the eleventh driver to race for the team that season.

=== FIA European Formula 3 Championship ===
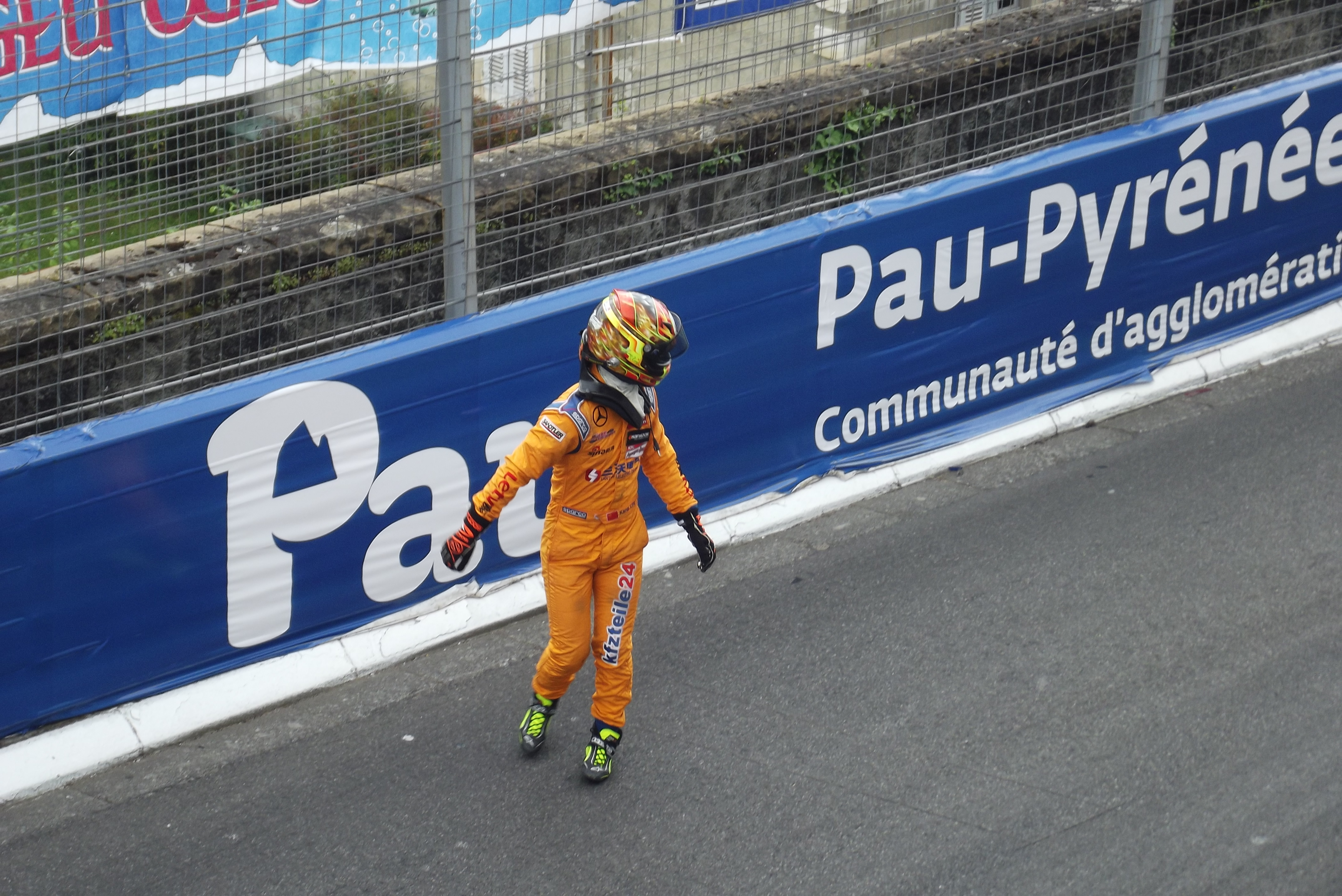
Ling Kang at the 2015 Pau Grand Prix (F3)

In 2015, Ling graduated to the FIA European Formula 3 Championship, joining Mücke Motorsport.

=== Euroformula Open Championship ===
After being dropped halfway through the 2015 FIA Formula 3 European Championship for poor results, Ling's seat was taken by Félix Serrallés.

Making guest appearances, Ling joined DAV Racing for the final two rounds of the Euroformula Open championship at Monza and the Circuit de Barcelona-Catalunya, achieving a best result of twelfth position. As a guest driver, Ling was unable to score points.

== Racing record ==
=== Career summary ===
Season	Series	Team	Races	Wins	Poles	F/Laps	Podiums	Points	Position
2013	French F4 Championship	Auto Sport Academy	19	0	0	0	0	11	20th
2014	Formula Renault 2.0 Alps	Koiranen GP	6	0	0	0	0	0	28th
2014	German Formula 3 Championship	ADM Motorsport	5	0	0	1	0	0	NC†
2014	British Formula 3 Championship	ADM Motorsport	3	0	0	0	0	5	17th
2014	GP3 Series	Trident	2	0	0	0	0	0	28th
2015	FIA Formula 3 European Championship	Mücke Motorsport	24	0	0	0	0	0	38th
2015	Euroformula Open Championship	DAV Racing	4	0	0	0	0	0	NC†
2016	Euroformula Open Championship	DAV Racing	6	0	0	0	0	0	24th
2016	Spanish Formula 3 Championship	DAV Racing	2	0	0	0	0	0	20th
2016	Lamborghini Super Trofeo Europe - Pro-Am	FFF Racing Team by ACM	2	1	0	0	2	27	10th
2016	Italian GT Championship	Antonelli Motorsport	2	1	0	0	2	32	17th
2017	International GT Open	Ratón Racing	12	0	0	0	0	13	16th
2017	China GT Championship - GTC	Xtreme Motorsport	6	0	0	1	3	81	4th
2017	China GT Championship	Xtreme Motorsport	2	0	0	0	0	22	17th
2018	International GT Open	Vincenzo Sospiri Racing	14	0	0	0	1	48	11th
2018	F3 Asian Championship	Zen-Motorsport	3	0	0	0	0	12	18th
2018	Blancpain GT Series Endurance Cup - Silver Cup	Ombra Racing	1	1	0	0	1	46	8th
2018	Blancpain GT Series Endurance Cup	Ombra Racing	1	0	0	0	0	0	NC
2018	Blancpain GT Series Endurance Cup	ARC Bratislava	1	0	0	0	0	0	NC
2018	Blancpain GT Series Endurance Cup - Pro-Am	ARC Bratislava	1	0	0	0	0	2	27th
2018	Lamborghini Super Trofeo Asia - Pro-Am	Top Speed Racing Team	2	0	0	0	1	10	8th
2018-19	Asian Le Mans Series - LMP2	ARC Bratislava	4	0	0	0	1	51	**3rd**
2019	International GT Open	Vincenzo Sospiri Racing	6	0	0	0	0	8	25th
2019	International GT Open - Pro-Am	Vincenzo Sospiri Racing	6	0	0	0	2	26	10th
2019-20	Asian Le Mans Series - LMP2 Am	ARC Bratislava	1	0	1	0	0	1	9th
2020	F4 Chinese Championship	BlackArts Racing Team	2	0	0	0	0	0	NC†
2020	Macau Grand Prix	BlackArts Racing Team	1	0	0	0	0	N/A	6th
2021	Porsche Carrera Cup Asia	Meidong Racing	14	1	1	0	7	214	5th
2022	Porsche Carrera Cup Asia	BD Group							
2022	Macau GT Cup	Phantom Pro Racing	1	0	0	0	0	N/A	4th
2023	GT World Challenge Asia - GT3	Phantom Pro Racing	12	0	1	0	0	12	33rd
2023	Greater Bay Area GT Cup - GT3	Phantom Pro Racing							
2023	China Endurance Championship - TCE	Phantom Pro Racing	2	1			2	43	6th
2023	Ultimate Cup Series - Sprint GT Touring Challenge - 3A	SR&R	2	2	1	2	2	48	8th
2023	Italian GT Championship - GT Cup	SR&R							
2023	Porsche Carrera Cup Italy	Ombra Racing	9	0	0	0	0	34	16th
2024	Porsche Carrera Cup Asia	R&B Racing	4	0	0	0	0	0	NC†
2024	FIA Motorsport Games GT Cup	Team China	1	0	0	0	0	N/A	9th
2024	992 Endurance Cup	Speedlover	1	0	0	0	0	N/A	25th
2024-25	Asian Le Mans Series - GT	Climax Racing	4	0	0	0	0	1	24th
2025	Middle East Trophy - 992	SebLajoux Racing							
2025	GT World Challenge Asia	Climax Racing							
2025	Lamborghini Super Trofeo Asia - Pro-Am	Climax Racing	12	1	0	0	6	96	4th
2026	Porsche Carrera Cup Asia	Origine Motorsport	13	0	0	0	1	121	6th
2026	China GT Championship - GT3	Origine Motorsport							
2026	Shanghai 8 Hours	Origine Motorsport	1	0	0	0	0	N/A	9th

^{†} As Ling was a guest driver, he was ineligible for points.

=== Complete Formula Renault 2.0 Alps Series results ===
(key) (Races in bold indicate pole position; races in italics indicate fastest lap)

Year	Team	1	2	3	4	5	6	7	8	9	10	11	12	13	14	Pos	Points
2014	Koiranen GP	IMO; 1; 25	IMO; 2; 21	PAU; 1; 14	PAU; 2 Ret	RBR; 1	RBR; 2	SPA; 1; 15	SPA; 2; 18	MNZ; 1	MNZ; 2	MUG; 1	MUG; 2	JER; 1	JER; 2	28th	0

=== Complete GP3 Series results ===
(key) (Races in bold indicate pole position) (Races in italics indicate fastest lap)

Year	Entrant	1	2	3	4	5	6	7	8	9	10	11	12	13	14	15	16	17	18	Pos	Points
2014	Trident	CAT; FEA	CAT; SPR	RBR; FEA	RBR; SPR	SIL; FEA	SIL; SPR	HOC; FEA	HOC; SPR	HUN; FEA	HUN; SPR	SPA; FEA	SPA; SPR	MNZ; FEA	MNZ; SPR	SOC; FEA	SOC; SPR	YMC; FEA; 20	YMC; SPR; 16	28th	0

=== Complete FIA European Formula 3 Championship results ===
(key) (Races in bold indicate pole position) (Races in italics indicate fastest lap)

Year	Entrant	Engine	1	2	3	4	5	6	7	8	9	10	11	12	13	14	15	16	17	18	19	20	21	22	23	24	25	26	27	28	29	30	31	32	33	DC	Points
2015	kfzteile24 Mücke Motorsport	Mercedes	SIL; 1 Ret	SIL; 2; 21	SIL; 3 Ret	HOC; 1 Ret	HOC; 2; 28	HOC; 3; 24	PAU; 1; 20	PAU; 2 Ret	PAU; 3 Ret	MNZ; 1 Ret	MNZ; 2; 26	MNZ; 3; 24	SPA; 1; 26	SPA; 2 Ret	SPA; 3; 20	NOR; 1; 21	NOR; 2 Ret	NOR; 3; 22	ZAN; 1; 23	ZAN; 2; 24	ZAN; 3; 23	RBR; 1; 29	RBR; 2; 26	RBR; 3 Ret	ALG; 1	ALG; 2	ALG; 3	NÜR; 1	NÜR; 2	NÜR; 3	HOC; 1	HOC; 2	HOC; 3	38th	0
