= 2016 F4 Chinese Championship =

Motor racing competition

The 2016 F4 Chinese Championship season (Shell Cup FIA F4 Chinese Championship) was the second season of the F4 Chinese Championship. It began on 23 April at the Zhuhai International Circuit and finished on 6 November at the Guangdong International Circuit after five triple-header rounds, all of them co-hosted with the China Formula Grand Prix championship.

== Teams and drivers ==
Team	No.	Driver	Class	Rounds
(China) Champ Motorsport	2	(Hong Kong) Xie Ruilin		All
(China) Champ Motorsport	8	(China) Daniel Lu		1, 4–5
(China) Champ Motorsport	58	(Germany) Yves Volte	G	4
(China) AKZC Shunda Racing Team	3	(China) Chen Zhuoxuan		1
(China) Guangqi Automobile Racing Team	5	(China) Alex Yang	G	3
(China) Guangqi Automobile Racing Team	7	(China) Yang Xi		1–2, 4–5
(China) Guangqi Automobile Racing Team	88	(China) Wu Ruopeng		1–4
(Macau) Asia Racing Team	6	(China) Billy Zheng	G	4
(Macau) Asia Racing Team	11	(Macau) Hon Chio Leong	G	1, 3–4
(Macau) Asia Racing Team	27	(United States) Zhu Tianqi		1
(Macau) Asia Racing Team	86	(China) Daniel Cao	G	5
(United States) UMC Utah Motorsports Campus	20	(Brazil) Bruno Carneiro		All
(United States) UMC Utah Motorsports Campus	34	(United States) Tommy Boileau		4
(China) Beijing Manthey Racing	21	(China) Liu Kai		1–3
(China) Beijing Manthey Racing	22	(China) Lin Taian		All
(China) Beijing Manthey Racing	99	(Canada) Maxx Ebenal		4–5
(Hong Kong) BlackArts Racing	28	(Singapore) Pavan Ravishankar		4
(China) Friends Come From Far Away	57	(China) Xi Xiuping		All
(China) Friends Come From Far Away	76	(China) Liu Yang		All
(Finland) PS Racing	66	(Canada) Maxx Ebenal		1

Icon	Class
G	Guest drivers ineligible to score points

== Race calendar and results ==
A five–round provisional calendar was revealed on 31 December 2015. All rounds were held in China and, as opposed to the previous season, the calendar was not spread over two years. The calendar was slightly revised on 10 March. A later update changed the venue of the season finale from Guangdong to Zhuhai.

Round		Circuit	Date	Pole position	Fastest lap	Winning driver	Winning team
1	R1	Zhuhai International Circuit, Zhuhai	23 April	(Canada) Maxx Ebenal	(China) Liu Kai	(China) Liu Kai	(China) Beijing Manthey Racing
1	R2	Zhuhai International Circuit, Zhuhai	24 April		(Canada) Maxx Ebenal	(Canada) Maxx Ebenal	(Finland) PS Racing
1	R3	Zhuhai International Circuit, Zhuhai	24 April		(Canada) Maxx Ebenal	(Canada) Maxx Ebenal	(Finland) PS Racing
2	R1	Chengdu Goldenport Circuit, Chengdu	28 May	(Brazil) Bruno Carneiro	(Brazil) Bruno Carneiro	(Brazil) Bruno Carneiro	(United States) Utah Motorsports Campus
2	R2	Chengdu Goldenport Circuit, Chengdu	29 May		(Brazil) Bruno Carneiro	(Brazil) Bruno Carneiro	(United States) Utah Motorsports Campus
2	R3	Chengdu Goldenport Circuit, Chengdu	29 May		(Brazil) Bruno Carneiro	(Brazil) Bruno Carneiro	(United States) Utah Motorsports Campus
3	R1	Goldenport Park Circuit, Beijing	2 July	(Macau) Hon Chio Leong	(Brazil) Bruno Carneiro	(Brazil) Bruno Carneiro	(United States) Utah Motorsports Campus
3	R2	Goldenport Park Circuit, Beijing	3 July		(Brazil) Bruno Carneiro	(Brazil) Bruno Carneiro	(United States) Utah Motorsports Campus
3	R3	Goldenport Park Circuit, Beijing	3 July		(Brazil) Bruno Carneiro	(Brazil) Bruno Carneiro	(United States) Utah Motorsports Campus
4	R1	Shanghai International Circuit, Shanghai	10 September	(Canada) Maxx Ebenal	(Brazil) Bruno Carneiro	(Brazil) Bruno Carneiro	(United States) Utah Motorsports Campus
4	R2	Shanghai International Circuit, Shanghai	11 September		(Macau) Hon Chio Leong	(Macau) Hon Chio Leong	(Macau) Asia Racing Team
4	R3	Shanghai International Circuit, Shanghai	11 September		(Canada) Maxx Ebenal	(Canada) Maxx Ebenal	(China) Beijing Manthey Racing
5	R1	Zhuhai International Circuit, Zhuhai	12 November	(China) Daniel Cao	(Canada) Maxx Ebenal	(Canada) Maxx Ebenal	(China) Beijing Manthey Racing
5	R2	Zhuhai International Circuit, Zhuhai	13 November		(China) Daniel Cao	(Brazil) Bruno Carneiro	(United States) Utah Motorsports Campus
5	R3	Zhuhai International Circuit, Zhuhai	13 November		(Canada) Maxx Ebenal	(Canada) Maxx Ebenal	(China) Beijing Manthey Racing

== Championship standings ==
Points were awarded as follows:

Position	**1st**	**2nd**	**3rd**	**4th**	**5th**	**6th**	**7th**	**8th**	**9th**	**10th**
Points	25	18	15	12	10	8	6	4	2	1

=== Drivers' Championship ===
Pos	Driver	ZIC1			CGC			BGP			SIC			ZIC2			Pts
1	(Brazil) Bruno Carneiro	Ret	3	3	**1**	1	1	1	1	1	1	3	3	2	1	2	302
2	(China) Wu Ruopeng	2	4	4	2	2	2	2	2	2	4	7	5				187
3	(Canada) Maxx Ebenal	**Ret**	1	1							**2**	2	1	1	2	1	186
4	(China) Lin Taian	3	Ret	6	Ret	5	4	3	3	4	5	4	4	4	5	4	168
5	(China) Liu Kai	1	2	2	Ret	3	3	7	4	3							126
6	(Hong Kong) Xie Ruilin	4	8	7	3	8	5	6	7	6	9	Ret	Ret	5	7	8	109
7	(China) Liu Yang	7	Ret	9	4	7	6	5	Ret	Ret	Ret	9	Ret	7	6	7	76
8	(China) Yang Xi	6	6	8	5	4	7				8	DNS	DNS	Ret	9	5	70
9	(China) Xi Xiuping	9	9	11	6	6	Ret	DNS	Ret	5	11	10	10	6	8	6	66
10	(China) Liu Wenlong	Ret	Ret	DNS							Ret	6	8	Ret	4	3	50
11	(United States) Tommy Boileau										7	8	9				24
12	(United States) Zhu Tianqi	5	5	10													21
13	(China) Chen Zhuoxuan	8	7	5													20
14	(Singapore) Pavan Ravishankar										Ret	12	7				12
Guest drivers ineligible for championship points
	(Macau) Hon Chio Leong	DNS	DNS	DNS				**4**	5	Ret	3	1	6				0
	(Germany) Yves Volte										6	5	2				0
	(China) Daniel Cao													**3**	3	Ret	0
	(China) Alex Yang							DNS	6	Ret							0
	(China) Billy Zheng										10	11	Ret				0
Pos	Driver	ZIC1			CGC			BGP			SIC			ZIC2			Pts

Colour	Result
Gold	Winner
Silver	Second place
Bronze	Third place
Green	Points classification
Blue	Non-points classification
Blue	Non-classified finish (NC)
Purple	Retired, not classified (Ret)
Red	Did not qualify (DNQ)
Red	Did not pre-qualify (DNPQ)
Black	Disqualified (DSQ)
White	Did not start (DNS)
White	Withdrew (WD)
White	Race cancelled (C)
Blank	Did not practice (DNP)
Blank	Did not arrive (DNA)
Blank	Excluded (EX)

**Bold** – Pole
Italics – Fastest Lap
