= 2019 Asian Formula Renault Series =

Motor racing competition

The 2019 Asian Formula Renault Series (aka AFR Series) was the 20th season of the AFR Series since its creation in 2000 by FRD. The season began on 23 March at the Zhuhai International Circuit and ended at the same venue on 8 December after five events. Joey Alders won the 2019 Championship in his debut season with his team BlackArts Racing Team.

Starting from 2015, drivers and teams compete in two classes, Pro (Class A) for drivers and teams competing with the 2013 FR2.0 car, and Elite (Class B) for drivers and teams using the FR2.0 old spec cars.

== Teams and drivers ==
Team	No.	Driver name	Class	Rounds
BlackArts Racing Team	2	(China) Patrick Tsang	P	2
BlackArts Racing Team	2	(China) Patrick Tsang	E	5
BlackArts Racing Team	7	(China) Stephen Hong	P	All
BlackArts Racing Team	23	(Netherlands) Joey Alders	P	All
BlackArts Racing Team	33	(Georgia (country)) Sandro Tavartkiladze	P	All
Asia Racing Team	3	(Singapore) Ni Weiliang	P	All
Asia Racing Team	6	(China) Ryan Liu	P	1
Asia Racing Team	8	(Hong Kong) Alex Suen	P	3
Asia Racing Team	9	(China) Peter Li	P	2, 5
Asia Racing Team	11	(Macau) Nicholas Lai	P	4
Asia Racing Team	21	(Brazil) Bruno Carneiro	P	All
Asia Racing Team	36	(Hong Kong) Jack Chan	E	1–2, 5
Asia Racing Team	44	(China) Pang Changyuan	E	2
Asia Racing Team	96	(Australia) Kurt Hill	P	1
FRD	8	(Hong Kong) Alex Suen	E	1
KRC Racing	16	(China) Naomi Zhang	P	1
KRC Racing	77	(China) Wang Yang	P	1
PS Racing	17	(China) Neric Wei	P	2–4
PS Racing	62	(Netherlands) Erwin Boon	P	3–4
PS Racing	76	(Finland) Elias Niskanen	P	1–4
Champ Motorsport	48	(Hong Kong) James Wong	P	5
S&D Motorsports	88	(Hong Kong) Victor Yung	P	1
S&D Motorsports	99	(Hong Kong) Hugo Hung	P	1–2

Icon	Class
P	Pro
E	Elite

== Race calendar and results ==
Round		Circuit	Date	Pole position	Fastest lap	Winning driver	Winning team	Elite Class Winner
1	R1	(China) Zhuhai International Circuit, Zhuhai	23 March	(Netherlands) Joey Alders	(Finland) Elias Niskanen	(Finland) Elias Niskanen	(Hong Kong) PS Racing	(Hong Kong) Alex Suen
1	R2	(China) Zhuhai International Circuit, Zhuhai	24 March	(Netherlands) Joey Alders	(Netherlands) Joey Alders	(Georgia (country)) Sandro Tavartkiladze	(Hong Kong) BlackArts Racing Team	(Hong Kong) Jack Chan
2	R3	(China) Zhuhai International Circuit, Zhuhai	15 June	(Netherlands) Joey Alders	(Netherlands) Joey Alders	(Netherlands) Joey Alders	(Hong Kong) BlackArts Racing Team	(Hong Kong) Jack Chan
2	R4	(China) Zhuhai International Circuit, Zhuhai	16 June	(Netherlands) Joey Alders	(Brazil) Bruno Carneiro	(Brazil) Bruno Carneiro	(Macau) Asia Racing Team	(Hong Kong) Jack Chan
3	R5	(Malaysia) Sepang International Circuit, Sepang	24 August	(Netherlands) Joey Alders	(Brazil) Bruno Carneiro	(Netherlands) Joey Alders	(Hong Kong) BlackArts Racing Team	No entrants
3	R6	(Malaysia) Sepang International Circuit, Sepang	24 August	(Netherlands) Joey Alders	(Netherlands) Joey Alders	(Netherlands) Joey Alders	(Hong Kong) BlackArts Racing Team	No entrants
3	R7	(Malaysia) Sepang International Circuit, Sepang	25 August	(Netherlands) Joey Alders	(Brazil) Bruno Carneiro	(Brazil) Bruno Carneiro	(Macau) Asia Racing Team	No entrants
4	R8	(Malaysia) Sepang International Circuit, Sepang	28 September	(Netherlands) Joey Alders	(Netherlands) Joey Alders	(Netherlands) Joey Alders	(Hong Kong) BlackArts Racing Team	No entrants
4	R9	(Malaysia) Sepang International Circuit, Sepang	28 September	(Netherlands) Joey Alders	(Netherlands) Joey Alders	(Netherlands) Joey Alders	(Hong Kong) BlackArts Racing Team	No entrants
4	R10	(Malaysia) Sepang International Circuit, Sepang	29 September	(Netherlands) Joey Alders	(Netherlands) Joey Alders	(Netherlands) Joey Alders	(Hong Kong) BlackArts Racing Team	No entrants
5	R11	(China) Zhuhai International Circuit, Zhuhai	7 December	(Netherlands) Joey Alders	(Netherlands) Joey Alders	(Netherlands) Joey Alders	(Hong Kong) BlackArts Racing Team	(Hong Kong) Jack Chan
5	R12	(China) Zhuhai International Circuit, Zhuhai	8 December	(Brazil) Bruno Carneiro	(Netherlands) Joey Alders	(Netherlands) Joey Alders	(Hong Kong) BlackArts Racing Team	(China) Patrick Tsang

== Championship standings ==
Points system

Points are awarded to the top 14 classified finishers. Drivers in Pro and Elite classes are classified separately.

Drivers' Championship
Position	**1st**	**2nd**	**3rd**	**4th**	**5th**	**6th**	**7th**	**8th**	**9th**	**10th**	**11th**	**12th**	**13th**	**14th**
Points	30	24	20	17	15	13	11	9	7	5	4	3	2	1

=== Drivers' Championships ===
Pos	Driver	ZIC (China)		ZIC (China)		SEP (Malaysia)			SEP (Malaysia)			ZIC (China)		Pts
Pro
1	(Netherlands) Joey Alders	**8**	**4**	**1**	**2**	**1**	**1**	**2**	**1**	**1**	**1**	**1**	1	314
2	(Brazil) Bruno Carneiro	2	Ret	3	1	2	2	1	4	2	2	2	**2**	265
3	(Georgia (country)) Sandro Tavartkiladze	4	1	2	4	5	3	3	3	3	3	4	3	240
4	(Finland) Elias Niskanen	1	Ret	4	3	4	4	5	2	4	4			174
5	(Hong Kong) Stephen Hong	6	Ret	6	Ret	3	5	4	5	5	5	5	5	153
6	(Singapore) Ni Weiliang	7	5	7	5	Ret	9	6	Ret	6	Ret	6	6	111
7	(China) Neric Wei			Ret	6	6	6	7	Ret	7	6			74
8	(China) Peter Li			5	8							3	4	61
9	(Netherlands) Erwin Boon					7	8	8	6	8	Ret			51
10	(Australia) Kurt Hill	3	3											40
11	(China) Ryan Liu	5	2											39
12	(Hong Kong) Hugo Hung	Ret	7	8	7									31
13	(Macau) Nicholas Lai								7	9	7			29
14	(Hong Kong) James Wong											7	7	22
15	(Hong Kong) Alex Suen					Ret	7	9						18
16	(China) Wang Yang	11	6											17
17	(Hong Kong) Victor Yung	10	8											14
18	(China) Naomi Zhang	9	9											14
19	(China) Patrick Tsang			9	Ret									7
Elite
1	(Hong Kong) Jack Chan	Ret	1	1	1							1	Ret	120
2	(China) Patrick Tsang											Ret	1	30
3	(Hong Kong) Alex Suen	1	DNS											30
4	(China) Pang Changyuan			Ret	Ret									0
Pos	Driver	ZIC (China)		ZIC (China)		SEP (Malaysia)			SEP (Malaysia)			ZIC (China)		Pts

Colour	Result
Gold	Winner
Silver	Second place
Bronze	Third place
Green	Points classification
Blue	Non-points classification
Blue	Non-classified finish (NC)
Purple	Retired, not classified (Ret)
Red	Did not qualify (DNQ)
Red	Did not pre-qualify (DNPQ)
Black	Disqualified (DSQ)
White	Did not start (DNS)
White	Withdrew (WD)
White	Race cancelled (C)
Blank	Did not practice (DNP)
Blank	Did not arrive (DNA)
Blank	Excluded (EX)

**Bold** – Pole
Italics – Fastest Lap
