= Bruno Carneiro =

Brazilian racing driver

- Nationality: (Brazil) Brazilian (United States) American
- Born: July 16, 1999 (age 27) São Paulo, Brazil

Asian Formula Renault Series career
- Debut season: 2019
- Current team: Asia Racing Team
- Car number: 21
- Starts: 12
- Wins: 2
- Poles: 1
- Fastest laps: 3
- Best finish: 2nd in 2019

Previous series
- 2015-16: China Formula 4 Championship

Championship titles
- 2016: China Formula 4 Championship

Bruno Carneiro (born 16 July 1999) is a Brazilian-American racing driver, the 2019 Asia Formula Renault Vice-Champion, the 2016 China Formula 4 champion.

== Career ==
=== Karting ===
Carneiro began karting in 2004, at the age of four. From there, he partook in numerous championships across his native Utah. Multiple Utah Champion in various classes from Kid Karts to Rotax Junior Max from 2005 to 2014.

-2010 Top 10 USA Rotax Grand Nationals Mini Max Class (Legree Motorsports) -2010 Top 45th Brazilian Karting Championship Super Cadet Class (Raucci Racing) -2010 Top 10 Trofeo Invernali Ayrton Senna Mini Vortex(DR Karting) -2010 Top 3 Sul Brasileiro Farroupilha Super Cadet (Waltinho Travaglini Karting) -2014 Top 15 USA Rotax Grand Nationals JuniorMax Class (Rolison Karting)

=== Lower Formulas ===
Carneiro graduated to single-seaters in 2015, competing in the NASA Utah Open Championship and finishing as champion in his first season. He also partook in the fourth round of the China Formula 4 Championship, claiming a fastest lap and a podium in the second race to finish thirteenth in the standings.

=== iRacing ===
Carneiro signed with his first eSports Team, Lotema Racing, a Portuguese racing team that competes in the highest levels of the iRacing Platform. He has recently joined one of Sim Racings top Esports team, Williams Esport. Carneiro currently has over 5,400 iRating and is still quickly climbing. His most raced cars on the iRacing service are the Porsche 911 GT3 Cup, Dallara F3, and the GTE and GT3 class cars. Carneiro races and competes amongst the best drivers of sim racing.

=== FIA Formula 4 ===
In 2016, Carneiro moved to the FIA Chinese F4 series full-time, taking eight victories and the title with wins in Zhuhai, Chengdu, Beijing and Shanghai

=== Formula 3 ===
In 2017, Carneiro joined the All-Japan Formula Three Championship with the ALBIREX RACING TEAM.

In 2018, Carneiro continued with the All-Japan Formula Three Championshipwith B-Max Racing/Rodizio Grill/Dallara-Volkswagen. Lack of funding forced Carneiro to quit early in the season, and taking part in only one round of the Championship held in Suzuka. He scored two sixth-place finishes scoring two championship points.

=== Asian Formula Renault ===
In 2019, Carneiro joined the Macau-based ART Motorsports to compete in the 2019 Asian Formula Renault Series driving a Tatuus-Renault 2.0. After twelve race weekends in Zhuhai and Sepang, Carneiro finished the season as vice-champion, with two wins.

=== Sports Cars ===
In 2018, Carneiro raced in the Nasa Utah Endurance race with Lamborghini Hurracan Super Trofeo 650 hp. The team, led by Carneiro, won the race.

== Racing Record ==
=== Career summary ===
Season	Series	Team	Races	Wins	Poles	F/Laps	Podiums	Points	Position
2015	NASA Utah Open Wheel	Rodizio Grill/Ian Lacy Racing	14	10			14	1270	**1st**
2015-16	F4 Chinese Championship	UMC Utah Motorsports Campus	2	0	0	1	1	16	13th
2016	F4 Chinese Championship	UMC Utah Motorsports Campus	15	8	1	7	14	302	**1st**
2016	Formula Car Challenge	Rodizio Grill/Ian Lacy Racing	10	5	1	7	8	225	**1st**
2017	Japanese Formula 3 Championship	Albirex Racing Team	20	0	0	0	0	1	11th
2018	NASA/WERK 6 Hour Endurance Race	Makes & Models/Horward Media Lamborghini	1	1	0	0	1	25	**1st**
2018	Japanese Formula 3 Championship	B-Max Racing Team	2	0	0	0	0	2	11th
2019	Asian Formula Renault Series	Asia Racing Team	12	2	1	3	10	265	**2nd**
2021	Mazda MX-5 Cup	Provision Motorsports	2	0	0	1	0	200	36th
2022	Mazda MX-5 Cup	Hixon Motor Sports	11	0	0	1	1	2110	13th

* Season still in progress.

=== Complete F4 Chinese Championship results ===
(key) (Races in bold indicate pole position) (Races in italics indicate fastest lap)

Year	Team	1	2	3	4	5	6	7	8	9	10	11	12	13	14	15	Pos	Points
2015–16	UMC Utah Motorsports Campus	BGP1; 1	BGP1; 2	BGP2; 1	BGP2; 2	SIC; 1	SIC; 2	ZIC1; 1 Ret	ZIC1; 2; 3	ZIC2; 1	ZIC2; 2						13th	16
2016	UMC Utah Motorsports Campus	ZIC1; 1 Ret	ZIC1; 2; 3	ZIC1; 3; 3	**CGC**; **1**; 1	CGC; 2; 1	CGC; 3; 1	BGP; 1; 1	BGP; 2; 1	BGP; 3; 1	SIC; 1; 1	SIC; 2; 3	SIC; 3; 3	ZIC2; 1; 2	ZIC2; 2; 1	ZIC2; 3; 2	1st	302

=== Complete Japanese Formula 3 Championship results ===
(key) (Races in bold indicate pole position) (Races in italics indicate fastest lap)

Year	Team	1	2	3	4	5	6	7	8	9	10	11	12	13	14	15	16	17	18	19	20	21	Pos	Points
2017	Albirex Racing Team	OKA1; 1; 11	OKA1; 2 Ret	OKA1; 3; 11	SUZ1; 1; 7	SUZ1; 2; 7	FUJ1; 1; 6	FUJ1; 2; 7	OKA2; 1 Ret	OKA2; 2; 10	SUZ2; 1; 9	SUZ2; 2; 8	FUJ2; 1; 8	FUJ2; 2 Ret	MOT; 1 Ret	MOT; 2; 11	MOT; 3; 11	AUT; 1; 9	AUT; 1; 7	SUG; 2; 7	SUG; 1; 7		11th	1
2018	B-MAX Racing Team	SUZ; 1; 6	SUZ; 2; 6	SUG1; 1	SUG1; 2	FUJ1; 1	FUJ1; 2	OKA1; 1	OKA1; 2	OKA1; 3	MOT; 1	MOT; 2	MOT; 3	OKA2; 1	OKA2; 2	OKA2; 3	SUG2; 1	SUG2; 2	SUG2; 3	SUG2; 4	FUJ2; 1	FUJ2; 2	11th	2
