= BlackArts Racing Team =

Chinese motor racing team

(Hong Kong) BlackArts Racing Team
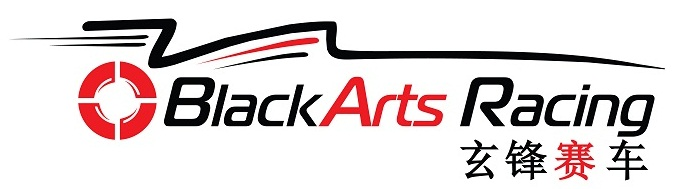
- Founded: 2015
- Base: Hong Kong (HQ); Zhuhai International Circuit, Guangdong Province, People's Republic of China (operations)
- Team principal(s): Bill O'Brien
- Current series: Formula 4 South East Asia Championship
- Former series: Asian Formula Renault Series; F4 Chinese Championship; Formula Regional Asian Championship
- Current drivers: (France) Pierre-Louis Chovet (Israel) Ido Cohen (Luxembourg) Brice Morabito (Switzerland) Thomas Luedi (Malaysia) Alister Yoong
- Teams' Championships: Asian Formula Renault Series: 2015-2019; China Formula 4 Championship: 2017-2019; F3 Asian Championship: 2020
- Drivers' Championships: Asian Formula Renault Series: 2015 : Dan Wells; 2016 : Josh Burdon; 2017 : Charles Leong; 2018 : Daniel Cao; 2019 : Joey Alders; China Formula 4 Championship: 2017 : Charles Leong; 2019 : Conrad Clark; F3 Asian Championship: 2019-20: Joey Alders
- Website: http://www.blackartsracing.com

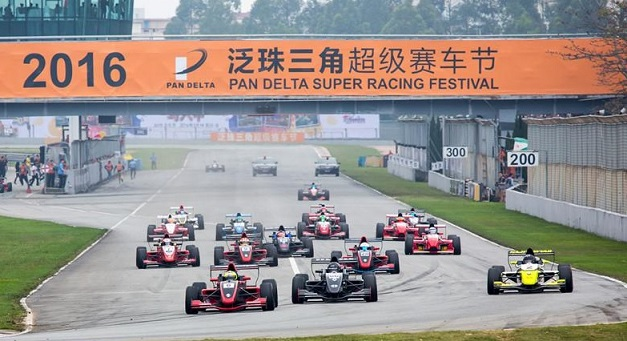
Asia formula renault 2016

BlackArts Racing Team (BAR) is a Chinese motor racing team that was formed in January 2015. Its main operational headquarters is located within the Zhuhai International Circuit, in Zhuhai, Guangdong Province bordering Macau. The teams business operations predominantly focus on professional racing series in Asia including F3 Asian Championship, Asian Formula Renault Series/AFR Series, Circuit Hero Series, China Formula 4 Championship, and TCR Asia Series. The team also provides year-round beginning and advanced driver training via racing schools, individual driver training, and corporate track days.

The team's most notable achievements include winning the Driver and Team Championships in the 2015-2018 Asia Formula Renault Series.

== History ==
The BlackArts Racing (BAR) team was founded by a group of four entrepreneurs, business professionals and senior executives in January 2015.

Team Highlights:

2015: A group of successful International entrepreneurs create BAR to compete in the Asia Formula Renault Series and Circuit Hero Series.

Asia Formula Renault - 12 races with 12 Class A Wins - Driver's Champion and 2nd Runner Up; Team Champion

Circuit Hero Series [Pan Delta Super Racing Festival] - 18 BAR podiums in 6 races - Champions, Class A and C

KL GP BAR 10th overall and 4th in the GT4 Class in the first ever KL GP

Macau GP Three BAR drivers in two divisions, including the F3 GP

2016:

Circuit Hero 500 km Winner, Class A; Double Podiums Formula Enduro

Asia Formula Renault - 12 races with 7 Class A Wins - Class A Driver's Champion; Team Champion

2017

Asia Formula Renault Driver's Champion Class A, Class B; Team Champion

FIA China F4 Driver's Champion; Team Champion

2018

Asia Formula Renault Class A Driver's Champion; Team Champion

FIA China F4 Team Champion

== Racing School ==
The Racing School is a formal driver training course recognized by the Hong Kong Automobile Association, able to issue race license certificates through its one-day and two day courses. The Racing School is available to both newer and experienced drivers. BAR also conducts an annual Advanced Training Course with the assistance of professional engineers and coaches such as Richard Bradley and Danny Watts. The Racing School is conducted with both Formula Renault cars and Volkswagen Scirocco R-Cup touring cars.

== Current series results ==
=== Formula 4 Australian Championship ===
Year	Car	Drivers	Races	Wins	Poles	Fast Laps	Points	D.C.	T.C.
2024	Tatuus F4-T421	(Philippines) Iñigo Anton	3	0	0	0	16	14th	N/A
2024	Tatuus F4-T421	(India) Arjun Chheda	0	0	0	0	0	NC	N/A

=== Formula 4 South East Asia Championship ===
Year	Car	Drivers	Races	Wins	Poles	Fast Laps	Points	D.C.	T.C.
2023	Tatuus F4-T421	(Australia) Lincoln Taylor	3	0	0	0	24	16th	6th
2023	Tatuus F4-T421	(Hong Kong) Vivian Siu	3	0	0	0	17	20th	6th
2023	Tatuus F4-T421	(Philippines) Iñigo Anton	3	0	0	0	14	21st	6th
2023	Tatuus F4-T421	(Malaysia) Alister Yoong	3	0	0	0	5	24th	6th
2023	Tatuus F4-T421	(India) Arjun Chheda	3	0	0	0	2	26th	6th
2023	Tatuus F4-T421	(United Arab Emirates) Ian Loggie	3	0	0	0	0	30th	6th
2025	Tatuus F4-T421	(Philippines) Iñigo Anton	13	0	0	0	182	3rd	2nd
2025	Tatuus F4-T421	(India) Rishon Rajeev	11	0	0	0	156	5th	2nd
2025	Tatuus F4-T421	(Vietnam) Ben Anh Nguyễn	14	0	0	0	93	7th	2nd
2025	Tatuus F4-T421	(Singapore) Joshua Berry	12	0	0	0	47	11th	2nd
2025	Tatuus F4-T421	(Malaysia) Putera Hani Imran	6	0	0	0	40	12th	2nd

== Former series results ==
=== F3 Asian Championship/Formula Regional Asian Championship ===
Year	Car	Drivers	Races	Wins	Poles	Fast Laps	Points	D.C.	T.C.
2018	Tatuus F3 T-318	(Hong Kong) Louis Prette	15	0	0	0	70	9th	6th
2018	Tatuus F3 T-318	(Hong Kong) Thomas Luedi	6	0	0	0	0	25th	6th
2018	Tatuus F3 T-318	(Indonesia) Presley Martono	3	0	0	0	6	20th	6th
2018	Tatuus F3 T-318	(Czech Republic) Tom Beckhäuser	3	0	0	0	1	22nd	6th
2019 Winter	Tatuus F3 T-318	(Macau) Charles Leong	3	0	0	0	20	12th	5th
2019 Winter	Tatuus F3 T-318	(Hungary) Vivien Keszthelyi	9	0	0	0	13	13th	5th
2019 Winter	Tatuus F3 T-318	(Netherlands) Joey Alders	3	0	0	0	0	NC	5th
2019 Summer	Tatuus F3 T-318	(Hong Kong) Thomas Luedi	15	0	0	0	1	20th	3rd
2019 Summer	Tatuus F3 T-318	(New Zealand) Brendon Leitch	15	0	0	1	152	4th	3rd
2019 Summer	Tatuus F3 T-318	(Czech Republic) Tom Beckhäuser	6	0	0	0	12	17th	3rd
2019 Summer	Tatuus F3 T-318	(Japan) Miki Koyama	6	0	0	0	18	15th	3rd
2019-2020	Tatuus F3 T-318	(Hong Kong) Thomas Luedi	14	0	0	0	3	17th	1st
2019-2020	Tatuus F3 T-318	(Netherlands) Joey Alders	15	5	0	3	266	1st	1st
2019-2020	Tatuus F3 T-318	(Japan) Yu Kanamaru	15	1	0	0	104	6th	1st
2019-2020	Tatuus F3 T-318	(Russia) Mikhael Belov	3	0	0	1	39	11th	1st
2019-2020	Tatuus F3 T-318	(Japan) Miki Koyama	3	0	0	0	6	16th	1st
2021	Tatuus F3 T-318	(Mexico) Rafael Villagómez	15	0	0	0	6	18th	6th
2021	Tatuus F3 T-318	(Spain) Lorenzo Fluxá	15	0	0	0	22	14th	6th
2021	Tatuus F3 T-318	(Portugal) Zdeněk Chovanec	2	0	0	0	2	19th	6th
2021	Tatuus F3 T-318	(Turkey) Cem Bölükbaşı	15	0	0	0	61	9th	6th
2022	Tatuus F3 T-318	(France) Pierre-Louis Chovet	12	0	0	0	26	16th	7th
2022	Tatuus F3 T-318	(Israel) Ido Cohen	6	0	0	0	4	21st	7th
2022	Tatuus F3 T-318	(Luxembourg) Brice Morabito	3	0	0	0	0	30th	7th
2022	Tatuus F3 T-318	(Hong Kong) Thomas Luedi	15	0	0	0	0	32nd	7th

=== F4 Chinese Championship ===
Year	Car	Drivers	Races	Wins	Poles	Fast Laps	Points	D.C.	T.C.
2016	Mygale M14-F4	(Singapore) Pavan Ravishankar	3	0	0	0	12	14th	NC
2017	Mygale M14-F4	(Macau) Hon Chio Leong	17	11	3	9	345	1st	1st
2017	Mygale M14-F4	(Monaco) Louis Prette	3	0	0	0	26	17th	1st
2017	Mygale M14-F4	(Australia) Josh Burdon	3	3	1	3	75	8th	1st
2017	Mygale M14-F4	(Germany) Yves Volte	14	1	0	2	239	4th	1st
2017	Mygale M14-F4	(China) Daniel Cao	2	0	1	0	27	16th	9th
2017	Mygale M14-F4	(China) Ryan Liu	11	0	0	0	39	11th	9th
2018	Mygale M14-F4	(Singapore) Daim Hishammudin	18	4	2	2	256	3rd	1st
2018	Mygale M14-F4	(Macau) Hon Chio Leong	3	2	0	0	0	NC	1st
2018	Mygale M14-F4	(United Kingdom) Daniel Wells	3	0	0	0	55	9th	1st
2018	Mygale M14-F4	(China) Daniel Cao	6	3	1	3	105	7th	1st
2018	Mygale M14-F4	(South Korea) Minjae Kang	3	0	0	0	32	13th	1st
2018	Mygale M14-F4	(Taiwan) Oscar Lee	6	0	0	0	50	12th	1st
2019	Mygale M14-F4	(China) Patrick Tsang	3	0	0	0	5	25th	1st
2019	Mygale M14-F4	(China) Lu Zhiwei	5	0	0	0	18	20th	1st
2019	Mygale M14-F4	(Macau) Nic Lai	8	0	0	0	24	19th	1st
2019	Mygale M14-F4	(New Zealand) Conrad Clark	17	12	3	10	379	1st	1st
2019	Mygale M14-F4	(China) Eric Sun	2	0	0	0	27	15th	1st
2019	Mygale M14-F4	(China) Liu Zezhen	3	0	0	0	48	7th	1st
2020	Mygale M14-F4	(China) Oscar Gao	8	0	0	0	51	9th	4th
2020	Mygale M14-F4	(China) Zhu Yuanjie	10	0	0	0	96	6th	4th
2020	Mygale M14-F4	(China) Kang Ling	2	0	0	0	0	NC	4th

== Timeline ==
Former Series
Asian Formula Renault Series	2015–2019
F4 Chinese Championship	2016–2020
Formula Regional Asian Championship	2018–2022
Formula 4 South East Asia Championship	2023, 2025
Formula 4 Australian Championship	2024
