= 2019–20 F3 Asian Championship =

Motor racing competition

The 2019–20 F3 Asian Championship was a multi-event, Formula 3 open-wheel single seater motor racing championship held across Asia. The championship featured a mix of professional and amateur drivers, competing in Formula 3 cars that conform to the FIA Formula 3 regulations for the championship. This was the third season of the championship, which was won by Joey Alders with BlackArts Racing Team.

The season commenced on 13 December 2019 at Sepang International Circuit and finished on 23 February 2020 on Chang International Circuit, after fifteen races held at five meetings.

== Teams and drivers ==
Team	No.	Drivers	Status	Rounds
(United Kingdom) Hitech Grand Prix	2	(United Kingdom) Jake Hughes		1–2
(United Kingdom) Hitech Grand Prix	3	(Russia) Nikita Mazepin		All
(United Kingdom) Hitech Grand Prix	10	(Italy) Alessio Deledda		All
(United Kingdom) Hitech Grand Prix	11	(Japan) Ukyo Sasahara	G	All
(China) Zen Motorsport	4	(China) James Yu		All
(China) Zen Motorsport	25	(Malaysia) Alister Yoong		5
(China) Zen Motorsport	44	(Hong Kong) Paul Wong	M	1–3, 5
(China) Zen Motorsport	44	(Malaysia) Gilbert Ang		4
(China) Absolute Racing	5	(China) Daniel Cao		1
(China) Absolute Racing	5	(Malaysia) Alister Yoong		4
(China) Absolute Racing	5	(Malaysia) Dominic Ang		5
(China) Absolute Racing	15	(United Kingdom) Jamie Chadwick		All
(China) Absolute Racing	16	(Australia) Tommy Smith		All
(China) Absolute Racing	17	(Canada) Devlin DeFrancesco		1–3
(China) Absolute Racing	17	(Malaysia) Najiy Razak		4
(China) Absolute Racing	17	(Netherlands) Leonard Hoogenboom		5
(Republic of Ireland) Pinnacle Motorsport	7	(Australia) Jack Doohan (Note: Doohan is an Australian driver who appeared as a British-licensed driver during Round 1 and as Australian thereafter.)		All
(Republic of Ireland) Pinnacle Motorsport	21	(Brazil) Pietro Fittipaldi		All
(Republic of Ireland) Pinnacle Motorsport	77	(Spain) Sebastián Fernández (Note: Fernandez is a Venezuelan-Spanish driver racing under a Spanish licence)		2–3
(Republic of Ireland) Pinnacle Motorsport	77	(Malaysia) Dominic Ang		4
(Hong Kong) BlackArts Racing Team	9	(Hong Kong) Thomas Lüdi (Note: Luedi is a Swiss driver racing under a license from Hong Kong.)	M	All
(Hong Kong) BlackArts Racing Team	23	(Netherlands) Joey Alders (Note: Alders is a Dutch driver who appeared as a Hong Kong-licensed driver during Round 1 and as Dutch thereafter.)		All
(Hong Kong) BlackArts Racing Team	33	(Japan) Yu Kanamaru		All
(Hong Kong) BlackArts Racing Team	57	(Russia) Michael Belov		5
(Hong Kong) BlackArts Racing Team	95	(Japan) Miki Koyama		4
(Netherlands) MP Motorsport	18	(Belgium) Amaury Cordeel	G	2
(Mexico) Seven GP	25	(Colombia) Tatiana Calderón		1–3
(United Arab Emirates) Abu Dhabi Racing UAE	88	(United Arab Emirates) Khaled Al Qubaisi	M	3

Icon	Status
M	Master
G	Guest

== Race calendar ==
The calendar was announced on 21 August 2019. For the first time it was held during winter months. Suzuka Circuit and the two weekends at Shanghai International Circuit were dropped from the series. An additional meeting at Sepang International Circuit and weekends at the Dubai Autodrome and Yas Marina Circuit were added, keeping the schedule at five weekends.

The winter schedule allowed drivers to use the series towards earning an FIA Super Licence after a June 2019 FIA World Motor Sport Council rule change allowing drivers to collect licence points from two championships in a calendar year providing the first ends before the second starts.

Round		Circuit	Date	Pole position	Fastest lap	Winning driver	Winning team	Supporting
1	R1	(Malaysia) Sepang International Circuit	13 December	(China) James Yu (Note: Ukyo Sasahara originally qualified on pole position, but was excluded for a technical infringement.)	(Canada) Devlin DeFrancesco	(Hong Kong) Joey Alders	(Hong Kong) BlackArts Racing Team	World Touring Car Cup; FIM Endurance World Championship; Formula 4 South East Asia Championship
1	R2	(Malaysia) Sepang International Circuit	15 December		(Hong Kong) Joey Alders	(Hong Kong) Joey Alders	(Hong Kong) BlackArts Racing Team	World Touring Car Cup; FIM Endurance World Championship; Formula 4 South East Asia Championship
1	R3	(Malaysia) Sepang International Circuit	15 December	(United Kingdom) Jack Doohan	(United Kingdom) Jack Doohan	(United Kingdom) Jack Doohan	(Republic of Ireland) Pinnacle Motorsport	World Touring Car Cup; FIM Endurance World Championship; Formula 4 South East Asia Championship
2	R1	(United Arab Emirates) Dubai Autodrome	9 January	(Japan) Ukyo Sasahara	(United Kingdom) Jake Hughes	(Australia) Jack Doohan	(Republic of Ireland) Pinnacle Motorsport	Dubai 24 Hour; TCR Middle East Series; Formula 4 UAE Championship
2	R2	(United Arab Emirates) Dubai Autodrome	10 January		(Australia) Jack Doohan	(Netherlands) Joey Alders	(Hong Kong) BlackArts Racing Team	Dubai 24 Hour; TCR Middle East Series; Formula 4 UAE Championship
2	R3	(United Arab Emirates) Dubai Autodrome	10 January	(Japan) Ukyo Sasahara	(Netherlands) Joey Alders	(Japan) Yu Kanamaru	(Hong Kong) BlackArts Racing Team	Dubai 24 Hour; TCR Middle East Series; Formula 4 UAE Championship
3	R1	(United Arab Emirates) Yas Marina Circuit	17 January	(Japan) Ukyo Sasahara	(United Kingdom) Jamie Chadwick	(Japan) Ukyo Sasahara	(United Kingdom) Hitech Grand Prix	TCR Middle East Series; Formula 4 UAE Championship
3	R2	(United Arab Emirates) Yas Marina Circuit	18 January		(United Kingdom) Jamie Chadwick	(Netherlands) Joey Alders (Note: Jamie Chadwick originally won the race, but received a 20-second time penalty for a false start.)	(Hong Kong) BlackArts Racing Team	TCR Middle East Series; Formula 4 UAE Championship
3	R3	(United Arab Emirates) Yas Marina Circuit	18 January	(Spain) Sebastián Fernández	(Spain) Sebastián Fernández	(Spain) Sebastián Fernández	(Republic of Ireland) Pinnacle Motorsport	TCR Middle East Series; Formula 4 UAE Championship
4	R1	(Malaysia) Sepang International Circuit	14 February	(Australia) Jack Doohan	(Netherlands) Joey Alders	(Australia) Jack Doohan	(Republic of Ireland) Pinnacle Motorsport	Asian Le Mans Series; TCR Malaysia
4	R2	(Malaysia) Sepang International Circuit	15 February		(Australia) Jack Doohan	(Australia) Jack Doohan	(Republic of Ireland) Pinnacle Motorsport	Asian Le Mans Series; TCR Malaysia
4	R3	(Malaysia) Sepang International Circuit	15 February	(Australia) Jack Doohan	(Australia) Jack Doohan	(Australia) Jack Doohan	(Republic of Ireland) Pinnacle Motorsport	Asian Le Mans Series; TCR Malaysia
5	R1	(Thailand) Chang International Circuit	22 February	(Australia) Jack Doohan	(Australia) Jack Doohan	(Netherlands) Joey Alders	(Hong Kong) BlackArts Racing Team	Asian Le Mans Series
5	R2	(Thailand) Chang International Circuit	23 February		(Russia) Michael Belov	(Japan) Ukyo Sasahara	(United Kingdom) Hitech Grand Prix	Asian Le Mans Series
5	R3	(Thailand) Chang International Circuit	23 February	(Japan) Ukyo Sasahara	(Japan) Ukyo Sasahara	(Japan) Ukyo Sasahara	(United Kingdom) Hitech Grand Prix	Asian Le Mans Series

== Championship standings ==
=== Scoring system ===
Points were awarded to the top ten drivers.

Position	**1st**	**2nd**	**3rd**	**4th**	**5th**	**6th**	**7th**	**8th**	**9th**	**10th**
Points	25	18	15	12	10	8	6	4	2	1

=== Drivers' Championship ===
Pos	Driver	SEP1 (Malaysia)			DUB (United Arab Emirates)			ABU (United Arab Emirates)			SEP2 (Malaysia)			CHA (Thailand)			Pts
Pos	Driver	R1	R2	R3	R1	R2	R3	R1	R2	R3	R1	R2	R3	R1	R2	R3	Pts
1	(Netherlands) Joey Alders	1	1	3	2	1	3	5	1	6	2	8	2	1	3	7	266
2	(Australia) Jack Doohan	2	8	**1**	1	3	11	3	Ret	2	**1**	1	**1**	**8**	13†	2	229
3	(Russia) Nikita Mazepin	4	2	5	4	4	6	2	6	3	5	2	4	5	8	8	186
4	(United Kingdom) Jamie Chadwick	7	10	8	6	11	8	9	8	9	3	4	6	2	2	3	139
5	(Brazil) Pietro Fittipaldi	14	12	11	7	13	7	4	5	5	4	5	5	3	4	10	119
6	(Japan) Yu Kanamaru	6	5	Ret	9	10	1	Ret	11	Ret	6	6	3	10	6	5	104
7	(Canada) Devlin DeFrancesco	3	9	2	5	6	5	6	3	7							101
8	(Spain) Sebastián Fernández				3	2	4	7	4	**1**							96
9	(China) James Yu	**9**	6	4	15	8	16	11	7	11	8	7	8	9	7	9	70
10	(Australia) Tommy Smith	10	11	10	8	12	13	12	Ret	8	7	11†	7	6	9	6	48
11	(Russia) Michael Belov													4	5	4	39
12	(China) Daniel Cao	5	3	7													31
13	(Colombia) Tatiana Calderón	Ret	4	9	11	9	9	8	Ret	10							31
14	(United Kingdom) Jake Hughes	Ret	7	6	12	5	Ret										24
15	(Italy) Alessio Deledda	11	13	12	13	Ret	12	10	9	12	Ret	9	10	7	10	13†	21
16	(Japan) Miki Koyama										10	10†	9				6
17	(Hong Kong) Thomas Lüdi	12	DNS	13	Ret	15	14	Ret	12	14	11	Ret	11	11	11	11	3
18	(United Arab Emirates) Khaled Al Qubaisi							13	10	13							2
19	(Hong Kong) Paul Wong	13	14	14	14	14	15	14	13	15				12	12	12	0
—	(Malaysia) Alister Yoong										Ret	DNS	DNS	Ret	DNS	DNS	0
—	(Malaysia) Dominic Ang										Ret	DNS	DNS	Ret	DNS	DNS	0
—	(Malaysia) Najiy Razak										Ret	DNS	DNS				0
—	(Malaysia) Gilbert Ang										Ret	DNS	DNS				0
—	(Netherlands) Leonard Hoogenboom													Ret	DNS	DNS	0
Guest drivers ineligible to score points
—	(Japan) Ukyo Sasahara	8	15†	15†	**16**†	Ret	**2**	**1**	2	4	9†	3	12†	13	1	**1**	—
—	(Belgium) Amaury Cordeel				10	7	10										—
Pos	Driver	R1	R2	R3	R1	R2	R3	R1	R2	R3	R1	R2	R3	R1	R2	R3	Pts
Pos	Driver	SEP1 (Malaysia)			DUB (United Arab Emirates)			ABU (United Arab Emirates)			SEP2 (Malaysia)			CHA (Thailand)			Pts

Colour	Result
Gold	Winner
Silver	Second place
Bronze	Third place
Green	Points classification
Blue	Non-points classification
Blue	Non-classified finish (NC)
Purple	Retired, not classified (Ret)
Red	Did not qualify (DNQ)
Red	Did not pre-qualify (DNPQ)
Black	Disqualified (DSQ)
White	Did not start (DNS)
White	Withdrew (WD)
White	Race cancelled (C)
Blank	Did not practice (DNP)
Blank	Did not arrive (DNA)
Blank	Excluded (EX)

**Bold** – Pole
Italics – Fastest Lap

Notes:

- † — Drivers did not finish the race, but were classified as they completed over 75% of the race distance.

=== Masters Cup ===
Pos	Driver	SEP1 (Malaysia)			DUB (United Arab Emirates)			ABU (United Arab Emirates)			SEP2 (Malaysia)			CHA (Thailand)			Pts
Pos	Driver	R1	R2	R3	R1	R2	R3	R1	R2	R3	R1	R2	R3	R1	R2	R3	Pts
1	(Hong Kong) Thomas Lüdi	12	DNS	13	Ret	15	14	Ret	12	14	11	Ret	11	11	11	11	254
2	(Hong Kong) Paul Wong	13	14	14	14	14	15	14	13	15				12	12	12	231
3	(United Arab Emirates) Khaled Al Qubaisi							13	10	13							75
Pos	Driver	R1	R2	R3	R1	R2	R3	R1	R2	R3	R1	R2	R3	R1	R2	R3	Pts
Pos	Driver	SEP1 (Malaysia)			DUB (United Arab Emirates)			ABU (United Arab Emirates)			SEP2 (Malaysia)			CHA (Thailand)			Pts

=== Teams Championship ===
Pos	Team	Pts
1	(Hong Kong) BlackArts Racing Team	386
2	(Republic of Ireland) Pinnacle Motorsport	357
3	(China) Absolute Racing	295
4	(United Kingdom) Hitech Grand Prix	229
5	(China) Zen Motorsport	70
6	(Mexico) Seven GP	31
7	(United Arab Emirates) Abu Dhabi Racing UAE	2
8	(Netherlands) MP Motorsport	0
