= 2027 Formula Regional Asian Championship =

Motor racing competition

The 2027 Formula Regional Asian Championship is a scheduled multi-event, Formula Regional open-wheel single seater motor racing championship. This is scheduled to be the sixth season of the championship and the second season under the Formula Regional moniker. The championship last ran in 2022, before the 2023 season was cancelled and the series went into hiatus.

The season is scheduled to be held across six rounds, starting in May in China and finishing in September in Malaysia.

== Teams and drivers ==
All teams will compete using identical Tatuus T-326 cars powered by Toyota engines on Pirelli tyres.

== Calendar ==
The provisional race calendar was announced on 17 November 2026, together with the announcement of the revival of the championship by pan-Asian promoter Top Speed. The series will return to Shanghai International Circuit, where it last raced in 2019, and to Sepang International Circuit, which it last visited in 2020, as well as debut at Zhuhai International Circuit, at Inje Speedium. The intial announcement also had a round at Korea International Circuit, but that venue was dropped later on.

Round	Circuit	Date	Map of circuit locations
1	(China) Shanghai International Circuit, Jiading	3–5 May	2027 Formula Regional Asian Championship is located in Asia-Pacific
2	(China) Zhuhai International Circuit, Zhuhai	28–30 May	2027 Formula Regional Asian Championship is located in Asia-Pacific
3	(South Korea) Inje Speedium, Inje	18–20 June	2027 Formula Regional Asian Championship is located in Asia-Pacific
4	(South Korea) Inje Speedium, Inje	2–4 July	2027 Formula Regional Asian Championship is located in Asia-Pacific
5	(Malaysia) Sepang International Circuit, Sepang	20–22 August	2027 Formula Regional Asian Championship is located in Asia-Pacific
6	(Malaysia) Sepang International Circuit, Sepang	17–19 September	2027 Formula Regional Asian Championship is located in Asia-Pacific
