= Shougang International Circuit =

Motorsport circuit in China

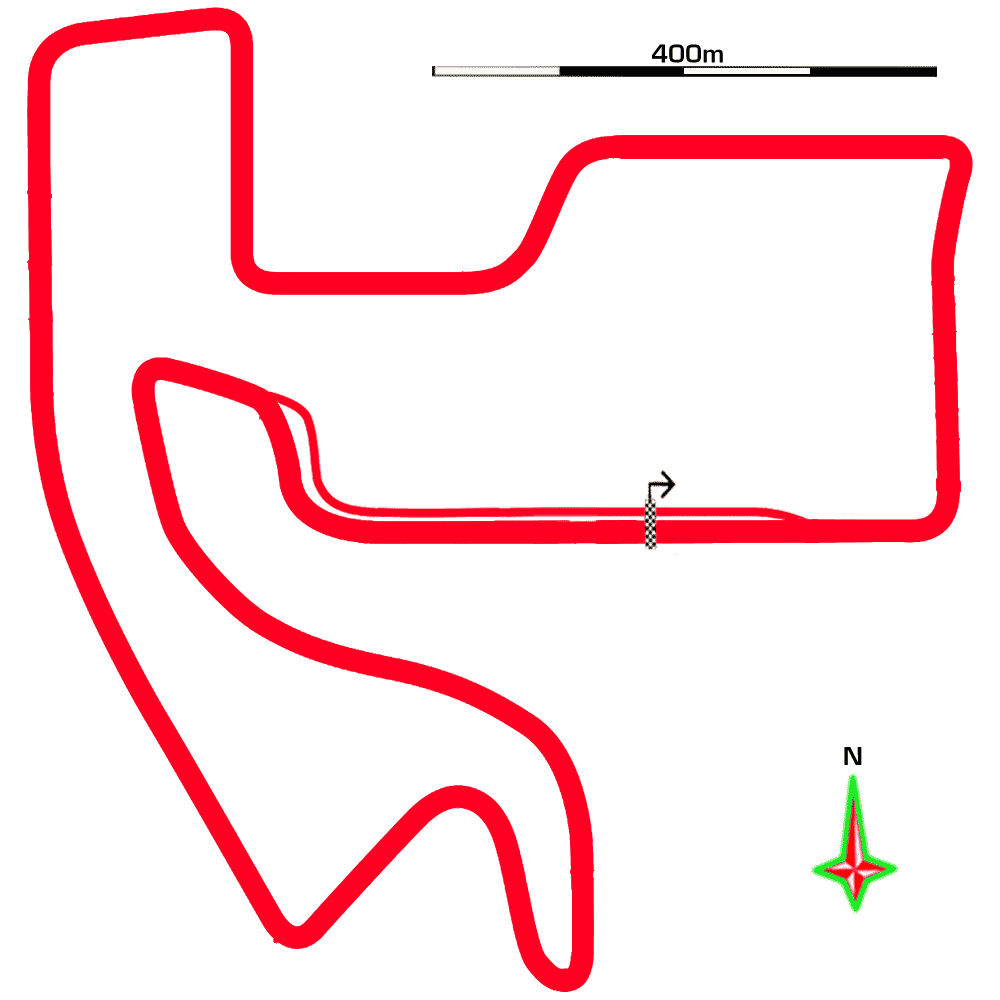
- Full Circuit (2018–present)
- Location: Qinhuangdao, Hebei, China
- Coordinates: 40°00′49.9″N 119°30′08.2″E
- FIA Grade: 2
- Opened: November 2018; 7 years ago
- Major events: Former: China Endurance Championship (2024); F4 Chinese Championship (2019); China GT Championship (2019, 2021)

Full Circuit (2018–present)
- Surface: Asphalt
- Length: 3.800 km (2.361 mi)
- Turns: 17
- Race lap record: 1:34.193 ( (Belgium) Alessio Picariello, Mercedes-AMG GT3, 2019, GT3)

The Shougang International Circuit (also known as Qinhuangdao Shougang International Circuit or Shougang Motorsport Valley) is a 3.800 km (2.361 mi) motorsport circuit located on the outskirts of the port city of Qinhuangdao in north-eastern China.

== History ==
The site of a former steel factory, the circuit was created as part of a push to beautify the Qinhuangdao region and encourage tourism – the factory was closed in June 2018, with the circuit construction completed in four months having integrated existing factory infrastructure into the design. The first event, a GT and truck racing festival, was held at the venue in November 2018. Formula 4 became the first national level category to compete at the circuit in August 2019 before the COVID-19 pandemic stunted plans for further use – as of 2024, the circuit is mainly used for GT racing through the Chinese Endurance Championship.
