= 2016 Asian Formula Renault Series =

Motor racing competition

Seasons
- ← 2015 2017 →

The 2016 Asian Formula Renault Series (a.k.a. AFR Series) is the 17th season of the AFR Series since its creation in 2000 by FRD. The season began on 19 March at the Zhuhai International Circuit and ended on 23 October at the Zhejiang International Circuit after six double-header events. For the first time, the series travelled to Korea and Thailand, hosting a round at Yeongam and Buriram respectively; the rest of the rounds were held in China.

Starting from previous season, drivers and teams compete in two classes, Class A for drivers and teams competing with the 2013 FR2.0 car, and Class B for drivers and teams using the FR2.0 old spec cars.

As part of an enhanced agreement with Renault Sport, the season featured a scholarship program for young Chinese drivers, called Road to Champion. The winner among these drivers over the last three rounds of the championship secured a link to race the following year in Europe with the help of Renault Sport.

== Teams and drivers ==
Team	No.	Driver name	Class	Rounds
S&D Motorsports	2	(Malaysia) Najiy Razak	A	All
S&D Motorsports	14	(Thailand) Umar bin Abdul Rahman	A	3
S&D Motorsports	31	(China) Song Xujie	B RTC	4–6
S&D Motorsports	48	(Monaco) Louis Prette	A	5–6
S&D Motorsports	56	(Macau) Tam Kuan Ioi	B RTC	4–6
S&D Motorsports	59	(Hong Kong) Yu Yuk Hang	B RTC	4, 6
S&D Motorsports	66	(Canada) Maxx Ebenal	A	1–2
Asia Racing Team	3	(Singapore) Ni Weiliang	A	All
Asia Racing Team	10	(Philippines) William Tan	A	All
Asia Racing Team	11	(China) Hua Miao	B	1–5
Asia Racing Team	18	(China) Liu Kai	A	1–3
Asia Racing Team	36	(China) Lin Taian	B RTC	5
Asia Racing Team	36	(China) Lin Taian	A RTC	6
Asia Racing Team	66	(Canada) Maxx Ebenal	A	4–6
Asia Racing Team	67	(Hong Kong) Jasper Thong	B	1–5
Asia Racing Team	67	(Hong Kong) Jasper Thong	A	6
Asia Racing Team	71	(United Kingdom) James Runacres	A	1, 3
Asia Racing Team	88	(Taiwan) Evan Chen	A	4
BlackArts Racing Team	5	(United States) Pete Olson	B	5
BlackArts Racing Team	5	(United States) Pete Olson	A	6
BlackArts Racing Team	6	(Australia) Josh Burdon	A	All
BlackArts Racing Team	9	(Switzerland) Thomas Lüdi	A	All
BlackArts Racing Team	17	(China) Neric Wei	A	1–3
BlackArts Racing Team	26	(China) Li Qingyuan	A RTC	4–6
BlackArts Racing Team	28	(Singapore) Pavan Ravishankar	A	All
BlackArts Racing Team	65	(India) Brad Dias	B	6
BlackArts Racing Team	91	(Hong Kong) David Pun	B	6
KRC Racing	7	(China) Bao Jinlong	A	1
KRC Racing	8	(China) Wang Yang	A	4
KRC Racing	24	(China) Hong Shijie	A	6
KRC Racing	43	(Taiwan) Mars Kang	A	5
KRC Racing	77	(China) Ye Hongli	A	3
KRC Racing	99	(China) Pu Shu	A	4
Korea Formula	27	(South Korea) Suh Seung-beom	B	2
Korea Formula	37	(South Korea) Kim Hak-kyum	B	2
Champ Motorsport	38	(Hong Kong) Victor Yung	B	5
Champ Motorsport	63	(Hong Kong) Xie Ruilin	B	1, 5
KCMG	47	(China) Liu Junjie	B RTC	4–6
KCMG	85	(Hong Kong) Ngan Ming Hang	B RTC	4–6
privateers	1	(Hong Kong) Chen Yi-Hsien	B	1
privateers	16	(Canada) Wayne Shen	B	1
privateers	21	(Hong Kong) Dominic Tjia	B	1
privateers	22	(Hong Kong) Francis Tjia	B	1
privateers	68	(France) Sébastien Mailleux	B	1

Icon	Class
A	Class A
B	Class B
RTC	Road to Champion Division

== Race calendar and results ==
Round		Circuit	Date	Pole position	Fastest lap	Overall winner	Class A Winner	Class B Winner
1	R1	(China) Zhuhai International Circuit, Zhuhai	19 March	(Australia) Josh Burdon	(Australia) Josh Burdon	(Australia) Josh Burdon	(Australia) Josh Burdon	(Canada) Wayne Shen
1	R2	(China) Zhuhai International Circuit, Zhuhai	20 March	(Australia) Josh Burdon	(Canada) Maxx Ebenal	(Canada) Maxx Ebenal	(Canada) Maxx Ebenal	(Canada) Wayne Shen
2	R3	(South Korea) Korea International Circuit, Yeongam	14 May	(Australia) Josh Burdon	(Australia) Josh Burdon	(Australia) Josh Burdon	(Australia) Josh Burdon	(South Korea) Kim Hak-kyum
2	R4	(South Korea) Korea International Circuit, Yeongam	15 May	(Australia) Josh Burdon	(Australia) Josh Burdon	(Australia) Josh Burdon	(Australia) Josh Burdon	(South Korea) Kim Hak-kyum
3	R5	(Thailand) Chang International Circuit, Buriram	11 June	(China) Ye Hongli	(China) Ye Hongli	(China) Ye Hongli	(China) Ye Hongli	(Hong Kong) Jasper Thong
3	R6	(Thailand) Chang International Circuit, Buriram	12 June	(Australia) Josh Burdon	(China) Ye Hongli	(China) Ye Hongli	(China) Ye Hongli	(China) Hua Miao
4	R7	(China) Shanghai International Circuit, Shanghai	21 August	(Australia) Josh Burdon	(Australia) Josh Burdon	(Australia) Josh Burdon	(Australia) Josh Burdon	(China) Hua Miao
4	R8	(China) Shanghai International Circuit, Shanghai	21 August	(Australia) Josh Burdon	(Australia) Josh Burdon	(Australia) Josh Burdon	(Australia) Josh Burdon	(Hong Kong) Jasper Thong
5	R9	(China) Zhuhai International Circuit, Zhuhai	17 September	(Canada) Maxx Ebenal	(Canada) Maxx Ebenal	(Canada) Maxx Ebenal	(Canada) Maxx Ebenal	(Hong Kong) Jasper Thong
5	R10	(China) Zhuhai International Circuit, Zhuhai	18 September	(Canada) Maxx Ebenal	(Canada) Maxx Ebenal	(Canada) Maxx Ebenal	(Canada) Maxx Ebenal	(Hong Kong) Xie Ruilin
6	R11	(China) Zhuhai International Circuit, Zhuhai	29 October	(Canada) Maxx Ebenal	(Malaysia) Najiy Razak	(Australia) Josh Burdon	(Australia) Josh Burdon	(China) Song Xujie
6	R12	(China) Zhuhai International Circuit, Zhuhai	30 October	(Canada) Maxx Ebenal	(Australia) Josh Burdon	(Australia) Josh Burdon	(Australia) Josh Burdon	(Hong Kong) Ngan Ming Hang

== Championship standings ==
Points system

Points are awarded to the top 14 classified finishers. Drivers in classes A and B are classified separately.

Drivers' Championship
Position	**1st**	**2nd**	**3rd**	**4th**	**5th**	**6th**	**7th**	**8th**	**9th**	**10th**	**11th**	**12th**	**13th**	**14th**
Points	30	24	20	17	15	13	11	9	7	5	4	3	2	1

=== Drivers' Championships ===
Pos	Driver	ZIC1 (China)		KOR (South Korea)		CHA (Thailand)		SIC (China)		ZIC2 (China)		ZIC3 (China)		Pts
Class A
1	(Australia) Josh Burdon	**1**	Ret	**1**	**1**	2	**DNS**	**1**	**1**	2	2	1	1	282
2	(Canada) Maxx Ebenal	2	**1**	3	3			2	5	**1**	**1**	**3**	**2**	237
3	(Malaysia) Najiy Razak	8	2	6	2	Ret	2	4	2	Ret	14	4	3	189
4	(Singapore) Pavan Ravishankar	Ret	9	Ret	5	4	3	5	4	3	Ret	2	5	156
5	(Philippines) William Tan	7	Ret	10	12	7	8	10	12	5	5	9	9	111
6	(China) Liu Kai	10	3	2	4	3	4							109
7	(Singapore) Ni Weiliang	Ret	Ret	8	10	Ret	9	8	8	6	3	Ret	Ret	84
8	(China) Neric Wei	13	4	4	11	5	5							84
9	(Switzerland) Thomas Lüdi	5	Ret	11	13	8	7	7	7	Ret	Ret	11	Ret	79
10	(China) Ye Hongli					**1**	1							60
11	(China) Li Qingyuan							9	Ret	4	6	DNA	7	50
12	(Monaco) Louis Prette									8	13	6	8	46
13	(Taiwan) Evan Chen							3	3			10	Ret	45
14	(United Kingdom) James Runacres	14	11			6	6							44
15	(China) Bao Jinlong	3	8											35
16	(China) Lin Taian											7	4	28
17	(China) Pu Shu							6	6					26
18	(China) Hong Shijie											5	Ret	17
19	(Hong Kong) Jasper Thong											Ret	6	15
20	(China) Wang Yang							13	9					11
21	(United States) Pete Olson											9	Ret	9
22	(Thailand) Umar bin Abdul Rahman					Ret	11							5
23	(Taiwan) Mars Kang									DNS	DNS			0
Class B
1	(Hong Kong) Jasper Thong	11	10	7	8	9	DSQ	12	10	7	8			212
2	(China) Hua Miao	6	Ret	Ret	7	Ret	10	11	11	9	7			180
3	(China) Song Xujie							14	13	12	12			66
4	(Hong Kong) Xie Ruilin	Ret	12							10	4			65
5	(Canada) Wayne Shen	4	5											60
6	(South Korea) Kim Hak-kyum			5	6									60
7	(Hong Kong) Ngan Ming Hang							15	14	13	Ret			47
8	(Hong Kong) Francis Tjia	9	7											40
9	(South Korea) Suh Seung-beom			9	9									37
10	(Hong Kong) Dominic Tjia	16	6											35
11	(United States) Pete Olson									11	11			30
12	(China) Lin Taian									Ret	9			17
13	(Hong Kong) Victor Yung									Ret	10			15
14	(France) Sébastien Mailleux	12	Ret											15
15	(Hong Kong) Yu Yuk Hang							16	Ret					15
16	(Taiwan) Chen Yi-Hsien	15	Ret											13
17	(Macau) Tam Kuan Ioi							Ret	Ret	14	Ret			11
18	(China) Liu Junjie							DNS	DNS	15	Ret			9
Pos	Driver	ZIC1 (China)		KOR (South Korea)		CHA (Thailand)		SIC (China)		ZIC2 (China)		ZIC3 (China)		Pts

Colour	Result
Gold	Winner
Silver	Second place
Bronze	Third place
Green	Points classification
Blue	Non-points classification
Blue	Non-classified finish (NC)
Purple	Retired, not classified (Ret)
Red	Did not qualify (DNQ)
Red	Did not pre-qualify (DNPQ)
Black	Disqualified (DSQ)
White	Did not start (DNS)
White	Withdrew (WD)
White	Race cancelled (C)
Blank	Did not practice (DNP)
Blank	Did not arrive (DNA)
Blank	Excluded (EX)

**Bold** – Pole
Italics – Fastest Lap

=== Road to Champion Division ===
Pos	Driver	SIC (China)		ZIC1 (China)		ZIC2 (China)	Pts
1	(China) Song Xujie	14	13	12	12		98
2	(China) Li Qingyuan	9	Ret	4	6		90
3	(Hong Kong) Ngan Ming Hang	15	14	13	Ret		64
4	(China) Lin Taian			Ret	9		24
5	(Macau) Tam Kuan Ioi	Ret	Ret	14	Ret		17
6	(Hong Kong) Yu Yuk Hang	16	Ret				17
7	(China) Liu Junjie	DNS	DNS	15	Ret		15
Pos	Driver	SIC (China)		ZIC1 (China)		ZIC2 (China)	Pts
