= Niccolò Schirò =

Italian racing driver (born 1994)

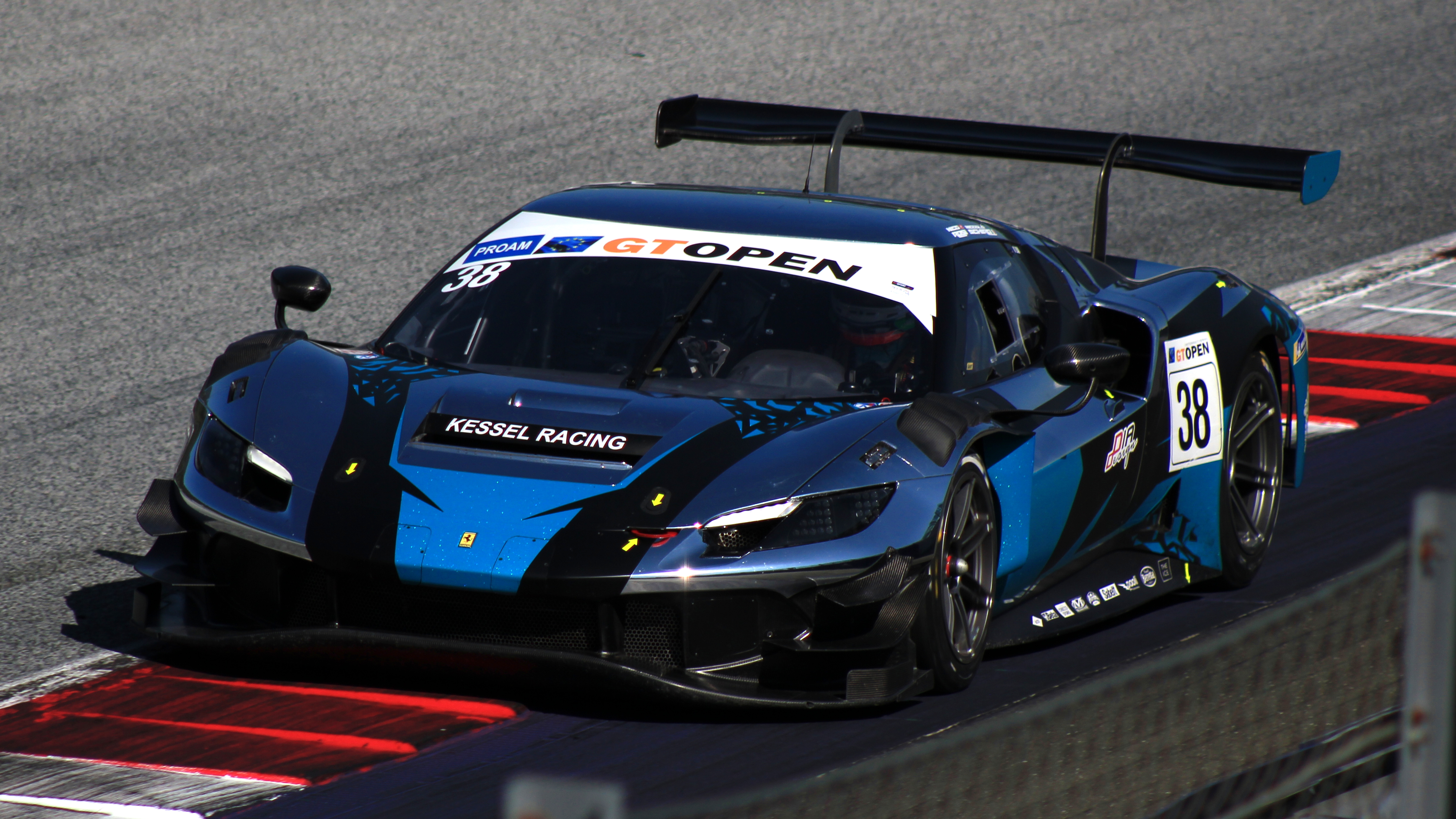
- Nationality: (Italy) Italian
- Born: 25 March 1994 (age 32) Milan (Italy)

International GT Open career
- Debut season: 2013
- Current team: Villorba Corse
- Categorisation: FIA Silver
- Car number: 1
- Former teams: Drivex School
- Starts: 24
- Wins: 2
- Poles: 3
- Fastest laps: 2
- Best finish: 3rd in 2014

Previous series
- 2011–12 2011 2010: European F3 Open; Italian F3; Formula Abarth

Championship titles
- 2012: European F3 Open

Niccolò Schirò (born 25 March 1994) is an Italian racing driver, who is best known for being the 2012 European F3 Open champion.

== Career ==
=== Karting ===
Born in Milan, Schirò began karting in 2007 and raced both in his native Italy and Europe for the majority of his karting career, working his way up from the junior ranks to progress through to the KF2 category a year later, when he finished 28th in the European KF2 Championship.

=== Formula Abarth ===
In 2010, Schirò graduated to single–seaters in the newly launched Formula Abarth series, competing with Emmebi Motorsport. He only finished five races inside the top twenty placings and finished the season in 29th place.

=== European F3 Open ===
Schirò stepped up to the European F3 Open Championship in 2011, joining RP Motorsport. He finished all but one of the season's races in the points, including two second-place finishes at Brands Hatch. This brought him fifth place in the final championship standings.

Schirò remained in the championship in 2012 with the same team. He scored four wins at Le Castellet and Monza and clinched the championship title ahead of teammate Gianmarco Raimondo, having trailed by fifteen points heading into the final weekend in Barcelona.

=== International GT Open ===
Schirò made his sports car racing debut in the SGT class of the International GT Open in 2013, racing for Drivex School. He finished fourth in the GTS standings with three class wins.

After competing for the Villorba Corse in the final round at Barcelona, Schirò would continue his partnership with the team in 2014.

=== Auto GP ===
Schirò made his Auto GP début in 2014 at Le Castellet, joining Ibiza Racing.

== Racing record ==
=== Career summary ===
Season	Series	Team	Races	Wins	Poles	F/Laps	Podiums	Points	Position
2010	Formula Abarth	Emmebi Motorsport	14	0	0	0	0	0	29th
2011	European F3 Open Championship	RP Motorsport	16	0	0	1	2	66	5th
2011	Italian Formula 3 Championship	RP Motorsport	2	0	0	0	0	1	16th
2012	European F3 Open Championship	RP Motorsport	16	4	3	7	12	272	1st
2013	International GT Open - Super GT	Drivex School	6	0	1	0	1	25	11th
2013	International GT Open - Super GT	Scuderia Villorba Corse	2	0	0	0	1	25	11th
2013	Spanish GT Championship - Super GT	Drivex School	2	0	1	0	1	?	7th
2014	Auto GP Series	Ibiza Racing	2	0	0	0	0	0	NC
2014	International GT Open - Super GT	Scuderia Villorba Corse	16	2	2	2	11	97	3rd
2015	Italian GT Championship - GT3	Scuderia Villorba Corse	14	0	0	0	7	113	5th
2016	Italian GT Championship - Super GT3	Easy Race	4	0	1	0	2	40	14th
2016	European Le Mans Series - LMP3	Villorba Corse	3	0	0	0	0	1	32nd
2017	Italian GT Championship - Super GT3 Pro	Easy Race	14	1	1	0	6	107	8th
2017	Pirelli World Challenge - GT	TR3 Racing	8	2	1	2	4	118	23rd
2019	Ferrari Challenge Europe - Trofeo Pirelli (Pro)	Rossocorsa	13	4	4	3	8	170	2nd
2019	Ferrari Challenge Finali Mondiali - Trofeo Pirelli (Pro)	Rossocorsa	1	0	0	0	1	N/A	3rd
2020	Le Mans Cup - GT3	Iron Lynx	1	0	0	0	1	18	11th
2021	Ferrari Challenge Europe - Trofeo Pirelli (Pro)	Rossocorsa	10	6	4	5	9	148	2nd
2021	Ferrari Challenge Finali Mondiali - Trofeo Pirelli (Pro)	Rossocorsa	1	0	0	0	1	N/A	2nd
2021	Italian GT Endurance Championship - GT3	Kessel Racing	3	0	0	0	0	9	13th
2021	Italian GT Sprint Championship - GT3 Am	Kessel Racing	8	3	4	2	5	97	2nd
2023	International GT Open	Kessel Racing	13	0	0	0	0	16	18th
2024	GT World Challenge Europe Endurance Cup	Kessel Racing	4	0	0	0	0	0	NC
2024	GT Cup Open Europe	Rossocorsa Racing							
2025	GT World Challenge Europe Endurance Cup	Kessel Racing	5	0	0	0	0	0	NC
2025	IMSA SportsCar Championship - GTD	Triarsi Competizione							
2026	GT Cup Open Europe	ZRS Motorsport							
2026	Italian GT Championship Endurance Cup - GT3	Rossocorsa	1	0	0	0	0	0	NC†
2026	GT World Challenge Europe Endurance Cup	Car Collection Motorsport	1	0	0	0	0	0	NC

=== Complete GT World Challenge Europe results ===
==== GT World Challenge Europe Endurance Cup ====
Year	Team	Car	Class	1	2	3	4	5	6	7	Pos.	Points
2024	Kessel Racing	Ferrari 296 GT3	Bronze	LEC; 20	SPA; 6H; 39	SPA; 12H; 27	SPA; 24H; 43†	NÜR	MNZ; 21	JED; Ret	8th	39
2025	Kessel Racing	Ferrari 296 GT3	Bronze	LEC; 31	MNZ; 34	SPA; 6H; 60	SPA; 12H; 48	SPA; 24H; 28	NÜR; 36	CAT; Ret	10th	34
2026	Car Collection Motorsport	Porsche 911 GT3 R (992.2)	Pro-Am	LEC	MNZ	SPA; 6H; 49	SPA; 12H; 46	SPA; 24H; 39	NÜR	ALG	NC	0

^{*}Season still in progress.

Sporting positions
Preceded by Alex Fontana	European F3 Open; Champion; 2012	Succeeded by Ed Jones
