= 2016–17 Formula 4 South East Asia Championship =

Motor racing competition

The 2016–17 Formula 4 South East Asia Championship season was the inaugural season of the Formula 4 South East Asia Championship. It began on 5 August at the Sepang International Circuit and finished on 22 January 2017 at the same venue, after 36 races held across six rounds.

The championship was won by Presley Martono.

== Drivers ==
No.	Driver	Rounds
3	(Netherlands) Ate de Jong	5
5	(Malaysia) Adam Khalid	4, 6
6	(United Kingdom) Michael Munemann	5–6
7	(Thailand) Worawong Komarakul	5
8	(Oman) Khalid Al Wahaibi	2–6
12	(Philippines) Angie King	2
17	(Malaysia) Nazim Azman	1
19	(Malaysia) Isyraf Danish	All
23	(Malaysia) Eric Louis	2–6
25	(China) "Daniel" Lu Wenlong	5
32	(Indonesia) Presley Martono	All
33	(India) Akash Gowda	All
34	(Thailand) Kane Shepherd	5
46	(India) Mohamed Nalwalla	1–4
51	(Philippines) Gabriel Cabrera	2
55	(New Zealand) Faine Kahia	All
56	(France) David Tatinclaux	4
66	(Singapore) Danial Frost	1, 3–6
68	(Malaysia) Chia Wing Hoong	2–4
71	(Indonesia) Kezia Santoso	1, 3
79	(Australia) Jordan Love	1, 4
86	(Australia) Dimitrios Zartaloudis	4
88	(Indonesia) Keanon Santoso	1–5
99	(Australia) Dean Koutsoumidis	4

== Race calendar and results ==
An updated race calendar was released on 1 June 2016, which cancelled the round at Kuala Lumpur City Grand Prix. An updated race calendar was released on 28 June 2016, which cancelled the round at Penbay International Circuit.

After the previously scheduled second round in support of the Sepang 1000 km was cancelled, a new revised calendar was released by Formula 4 SEA through their Facebook website, which expanded the calendar to 36 races to be held until January 2017 and added rounds in both the Philippines and Indonesia.

The Clark International Speedway round initially consisted of six-races. However, due to Typhoon Sarika, the final race was abandoned. For the Chang International Circuit, an additional race was run as a compromise.

Round		Circuit	Date	Pole position	Fastest lap	Winning driver	Supporting
2016
1	R1	(Malaysia) Sepang International Circuit, Selangor	5 August	(Australia) Jordan Love	(Australia) Jordan Love	(Australia) Jordan Love	Asian Le Mans Sprint Cup; Malaysia Championship Series
1	R2	(Malaysia) Sepang International Circuit, Selangor	6 August		(Australia) Jordan Love	(Australia) Jordan Love	Asian Le Mans Sprint Cup; Malaysia Championship Series
1	R3	(Malaysia) Sepang International Circuit, Selangor	6 August		(Singapore) Danial Frost	(Singapore) Danial Frost	Asian Le Mans Sprint Cup; Malaysia Championship Series
1	R4	(Malaysia) Sepang International Circuit, Selangor	7 August	(Australia) Jordan Love	(Australia) Jordan Love	(Australia) Jordan Love	Asian Le Mans Sprint Cup; Malaysia Championship Series
1	R5	(Malaysia) Sepang International Circuit, Selangor	7 August		(Australia) Jordan Love	(Singapore) Danial Frost	Asian Le Mans Sprint Cup; Malaysia Championship Series
1	R6	(Malaysia) Sepang International Circuit, Selangor	7 August		(Australia) Jordan Love	(Singapore) Danial Frost	Asian Le Mans Sprint Cup; Malaysia Championship Series
2	R1	(Philippines) Clark International Speedway, Mabalacat	15 October	(Indonesia) Presley Martono	(India) Akash Gowda	(India) Akash Gowda	
2	R2	(Philippines) Clark International Speedway, Mabalacat	15 October		(New Zealand) Faine Kahia	(India) Akash Gowda	
2	R3	(Philippines) Clark International Speedway, Mabalacat	16 October		(Oman) Khalid Al-Wahaibi	(Philippines) Gabriel Cabrera	
2	R4	(Philippines) Clark International Speedway, Mabalacat	16 October	(Indonesia) Presley Martono	(Philippines) Gabriel Cabrera	(Indonesia) Presley Martono	
2	R5	(Philippines) Clark International Speedway, Mabalacat	16 October		(Indonesia) Presley Martono	(New Zealand) Faine Kahia	
3	R1	(Indonesia) Sentul International Circuit, Bogor	11 November	(New Zealand) Faine Kahia	(Singapore) Danial Frost	(Singapore) Danial Frost	
3	R2	(Indonesia) Sentul International Circuit, Bogor	12 November		(New Zealand) Faine Kahia	(India) Akash Gowda	
3	R3	(Indonesia) Sentul International Circuit, Bogor	12 November		(New Zealand) Faine Kahia	(New Zealand) Faine Kahia	
3	R4	(Indonesia) Sentul International Circuit, Bogor	12 November	(Singapore) Danial Frost	(Singapore) Danial Frost	(Indonesia) Presley Martono	
3	R5	(Indonesia) Sentul International Circuit, Bogor	13 November		(New Zealand) Faine Kahia	(New Zealand) Faine Kahia	
3	R6	(Indonesia) Sentul International Circuit, Bogor	13 November		(New Zealand) Faine Kahia	(New Zealand) Faine Kahia	
4	R1	(Malaysia) Sepang International Circuit, Selangor	8 December	(Australia) Jordan Love	(Australia) Jordan Love	(Australia) Jordan Love	Intercontinental GT Challenge; Sepang 12 Hours
4	R2	(Malaysia) Sepang International Circuit, Selangor	9 December		(Singapore) Danial Frost	(Australia) Jordan Love	Intercontinental GT Challenge; Sepang 12 Hours
4	R3	(Malaysia) Sepang International Circuit, Selangor	9 December		(Australia) Jordan Love	(Australia) Jordan Love	Intercontinental GT Challenge; Sepang 12 Hours
4	R4	(Malaysia) Sepang International Circuit, Selangor	9 December	(Australia) Jordan Love	(Australia) Jordan Love	(Australia) Jordan Love	Intercontinental GT Challenge; Sepang 12 Hours
4	R5	(Malaysia) Sepang International Circuit, Selangor	9 December		(Australia) Jordan Love	(Australia) Jordan Love	Intercontinental GT Challenge; Sepang 12 Hours
4	R6	(Malaysia) Sepang International Circuit, Selangor	10 December		(Australia) Jordan Love	(Singapore) Danial Frost	Intercontinental GT Challenge; Sepang 12 Hours
2017
5	R1	(Thailand) Chang International Circuit, Buriram	6 January	(Malaysia) Isyraf Danish	(New Zealand) Faine Kahia	(Singapore) Danial Frost	Asian Le Mans Series
5	R2	(Thailand) Chang International Circuit, Buriram	6 January		(Malaysia) Isyraf Danish	(New Zealand) Faine Kahia	Asian Le Mans Series
5	R3	(Thailand) Chang International Circuit, Buriram	7 January		(Indonesia) Presley Martono	(Indonesia) Presley Martono	Asian Le Mans Series
5	R4	(Thailand) Chang International Circuit, Buriram	7 January	(Malaysia) Isyraf Danish	(New Zealand) Faine Kahia	(New Zealand) Faine Kahia	Asian Le Mans Series
5	R5	(Thailand) Chang International Circuit, Buriram	7 January		(Indonesia) Presley Martono	(Indonesia) Presley Martono	Asian Le Mans Series
5	R6	(Thailand) Chang International Circuit, Buriram	8 January		(India) Akash Gowda	(Indonesia) Presley Martono	Asian Le Mans Series
5	R7	(Thailand) Chang International Circuit, Buriram	8 January		(Indonesia) Presley Martono	(Indonesia) Presley Martono	Asian Le Mans Series
6	R1	(Malaysia) Sepang International Circuit, Selangor	21 January	(Indonesia) Presley Martono	(Malaysia) Isyraf Danish	(Malaysia) Isyraf Danish	Asian Le Mans Series
6	R2	(Malaysia) Sepang International Circuit, Selangor	21 January		(Malaysia) Isyraf Danish	(Indonesia) Presley Martono	Asian Le Mans Series
6	R3	(Malaysia) Sepang International Circuit, Selangor	21 January		(Malaysia) Isyraf Danish	(Singapore) Danial Frost	Asian Le Mans Series
6	R4	(Malaysia) Sepang International Circuit, Selangor	21 January	(Indonesia) Presley Martono	(Malaysia) Isyraf Danish	(Indonesia) Presley Martono	Asian Le Mans Series
6	R5	(Malaysia) Sepang International Circuit, Selangor	22 January		(India) Akash Gowda	(Indonesia) Presley Martono	Asian Le Mans Series
6	R6	(Malaysia) Sepang International Circuit, Selangor	22 January		(Malaysia) Isyraf Danish	(India) Akash Gowda	Asian Le Mans Series

== Championship Standings ==
The series follows the standard F1 points scoring system with the addition of 1 point for fastest lap and 3 points for pole. The best 30 results out of 36 races counted towards the championship.

Points were awarded as follows:

Position	1st	2nd	3rd	4th	5th	6th	7th	8th	9th	10th	PP	FL
Points	25	18	15	12	10	8	6	4	2	1	3	1

(key)

=== Drivers' standings ===
Pos	Driver	SEP1 (Malaysia)						CLA (Philippines)					SEN (Indonesia)						SEP2 (Malaysia)						CHA (Thailand)							SEP3 (Malaysia)						Pts
1	(Indonesia) Presley Martono	6	Ret	4	Ret	4	3	2	2	8	1	2	2	Ret	2	1	2	2	3	4	3	2	3	5	3	6	1	9	1	1	1	Ret	1	2	1	1	5	565
2	(New Zealand) Faine Kahia	3	3	2	2	2	4	3	5	Ret	3	1	Ret	4	1	2	1	1	Ret	Ret	4	4	2	4	2	1	8	1	2	2	5	3	2	7	3	6	7	563
3	(India) Akash Gowda	Ret	4	3	4	5	6	1	1	Ret	2	4	5	1	5	4	3	3	Ret	3	2	5	4	3	5	7	Ret	10	3	3	4	5	6	5	8	4	1	457
4	(Malaysia) Isyraf Danish	7	5	Ret	Ret	9	7	8	9	6	5	7	3	2	6	Ret	Ret	8	7	7	10	7	6	6	7	5	Ret	DNS	4	10	2	1	3	3	2	2	3	317
5	(Singapore) Danial Frost	2	2	1	3	1	1						1	Ret	Ret	Ret	DNS	4	2	2	5	3	5	1	1	2	2	2	6	4	3	Ret	4	1	4	3	4	317
6	(Australia) Jordan Love	1	1	Ret	1	7	2												1	1	1	1	1	2														296
7	(Oman) Khaled Al Wahaibi							5	7	2	Ret	5	8	4	4	Ret	7	6	6	6	6	8	7	8	6	3	6	3	Ret	6	Ret	4	8	4	5	5	2	278
8	(India) Mohamed Nalwalla	5	7	6	5	6	8	4	11	5	8	11	4	3	Ret	3	5	5	8	8	11	6	9	7														189
9	(Malaysia) Eric Louis							10	6	4	Ret	6	DNS						Ret	Ret	9	Ret	Ret	10	8	4	4	7	5	9	6	2	5	6	6	7	6	181
10	(Indonesia) Keanon Santoso	8	6	7	6	8	9	9	10	9	6	9	6	Ret	Ret	Ret	6	7	5	9	8	10	8	12	10	10	7	6	8	7	Ret							179
Guest drivers ineligible to score points
	(Philippines) Gabriel Cabrera							7	3	1	4	3																										0
	(Malaysia) Chia Wing Hoong							6	4	7	11	8	7	Ret	3	Ret	4	Ret	DNS																			0
	(Malaysia) Adam Khalid																		4	5	7	Ret	10	9								6	7	8	7	8	Ret	0
	(Malaysia) Nazim Azman	4	Ret	5	7	3	5																															0
	(Thailand) Worawong Komarakul																								9	9	3	4	9	5	8							0
	(China) Daniel Lu																								Ret	11	5	5	7	8	Ret							0
	(Philippines) Angie King							11	8	3	7	10																										0
	(Thailand) Kane Shepherd																								4	8	Ret	8	DSQ	11	7							0
	(Indonesia) Kezia Santoso	9	8	8	8	10	10						DNS																									0
	(France) David Tatinclaux																		10	10	12	9	11	11														0
	(Australia) Dean Koutsoumidis																		9	DNS																		0
	(Australia) Dimitrios Zartaloudis																		11	DNS																		0
	(United Kingdom) Michael Munemann																								DNS							DNS						0
	(Netherlands) Ate de Jong																								DNS													0
Pos	Driver	SEP1 (Malaysia)						CLA (Philippines)					SEN (Indonesia)						SEP2 (Malaysia)						CHA (Thailand)							SEP3 (Malaysia)						Pts

=== Rookie Cup ===
Pos	Driver	Pts
1	(Indonesia) Presley Martono	714
2	(Malaysia) Isyraf Danish	500
3	(Oman) Khalid Al-Wahaibi	439
4	(Indonesia) Keanon Santoso	351
5	(Malaysia) Eric Louis	284
