= Pavan Ravishankar =

Singaporean racing driver

- Nationality: (Singapore) Singaporean
- Born: 28 June 1999 (age 27) Singapore

BRDC British F3 Championship career
- Debut season: 2017
- Current team: Double R Racing
- Car number: 28
- Starts: 50
- Wins: 3
- Poles: 4
- Fastest laps: 2
- Best finish: 5th in 2019 F3 Asian Winter Series & 2019

Previous series
- 2019 2016-18 2016-17: F3 Asian Winter Series; MRF Challenge Formula 2000 Championship; Formula Renault AsiaCup

Pavan Ravishankar (born 28 June 1999) is a former racing driver from Singapore.

== Career ==
=== BRDC British Formula 3 Championship ===
Ravishankar started his British F3 career started in 2017, where he raced for Double R Racing at the final round at Donington Park where he finished 10th twice. In 2018, Ravishankar stayed with Double R Racing and raced the whole season alongside Krishnaraaj Mahadik and Linus Lundqvist, he finished on the podium twice one of which being a win at Silverstone. Ravishankar scored 153 points meaning he finished 15th in the standings. For the third season in a row, Ravishankar partnered with Double R to race in the 2019 BRDC British Formula 3 Championship. His best result was his only podium, where he finished third behind Benjamin Pedersen and Johnathan Hoggard. For the second time, Ravishankar finished 15th in the table 323 points behind champion Clément Novalak.

== Racing record ==
=== Career summary ===
Season	Series	Team	Races	Wins	Poles	F/Laps	Podiums	Points	Position
2016	Asian Formula Renault Series	BlackArts Racing Team	12	0	0	0	3	156	4th
2016	F4 Chinese Championship	BlackArts Racing Team	3	0	0	0	0	12	14th
2016-17	MRF Challenge Formula 2000 Championship	MRF Racing	16	0	0	0	0	6	18th
2017	Asian Formula Renault Series	BlackArts Racing Team	12	1	2	1	2	166	5th
2017	BRDC British Formula 3 Championship	Double R Racing	3	0	0	0	0	31	23rd
2017-18	MRF Challenge Formula 2000 Championship	MRF Racing	16	0	0	0	0	26	14th
2018	BRDC British Formula 3 Championship	Double R Racing	23	1	0	0	2	153	15th
2019	BRDC British Formula 3 Championship	Double R Racing	24	0	0	0	2	182	15th
2019	F3 Asian Championship - Winter Series	Dragon Hitech GP	9	0	0	0	1	73	5th

=== Complete F3 Asian Winter Series results ===
(key) (Races in bold indicate pole position) (Races in italics indicate fastest lap)

Year	Team	1	2	3	4	5	6	7	8	9	Pos	Points
2019	Dragon Hitech GP	CHA; 1; 3	CHA; 2; 4	CHA; 3; 8	SEP1; 1; 8	SEP1; 2; 8	SEP1; 3; 8	SEP2; 1; 7	SEP2; 2; 11	SEP2; 3; 5	5th	73
