= Danial Frost =

Singaporean racing driver

- Nationality: Singapore
- Born: Danial Nielsen Frost; 18 October 2001 (age 25) Singapore

Le Mans Cup career
- Debut season: 2026
- Current team: R-ace GP
- Categorisation: FIA Silver
- Car number: 85
- Starts: 6 (6 entries)
- Wins: 3
- Podiums: 5
- Poles: 0
- Fastest laps: 0
- Best finish: 1st in 2026

Championship titles
- 2026: Le Mans Cup

Previous series
- 2020 2019–20 2019–20 2018–19 2018 2016–18 2017–18 2017 2017 2017 2016–17: FR Americas; Indy Pro 2000; Asian Le Mans Series; MRF Challenge; U.S. F2000; F4 South East Asia; MRF Challenge; F4 Danish Championship; Formula 4 Japanese Championship; Formula Masters China
- Statistics up to date as of 27 October 2026.

Danial Nielsen Frost (born 18 October 2001 in Singapore) is a Singaporean race car driver. Having competed on the Road to Indy ladder during his early career, Frost switched to endurance racing, where he won the 2026 Le Mans Cup alongside Enzo Peugeot.

== Early career ==
Frost began his racing career in the 2016–17 Formula 4 South East Asia Championship. In 2017, he moved to the Formula Masters China and finished in third place. In 2017–18, he made his debut in the MRF Challenge Formula 2000 Championship. In 2018, he competed in the U.S. F2000 National Championship with Exclusive Autosport, and in 2019, he moved to the Indy Pro 2000 Championship, the second step on the Road to Indy.

In 2020, Frost signed with Andretti Autosport to drive in the Indy Lights series. However, because the series was cancelled as a result of the COVID-19 pandemic, Frost returned to the Indy Pro 2000 Championship with Turn 3 Motorsport. Frost won the season opener at Road America, having started from the back of the grid, before scoring five more podiums to place third in the standings. He also contested four rounds of the Formula Regional Americas Championship with Andretti, scoring a best finish of second at Sebring.

Frost moved to Indy Lights in 2021, driving for Andretti. He finished fifth overall, having attained four podium finishes and three pole positions.

Going into the 2022 season, Frost joined HMD Motorsports with Dale Coyne Racing. Despite claiming his maiden Indy Lights victory at Indianapolis, Frost dropped to seventh place in the standings — the win ended up being his only podium finish of the year. Towards the end of the year, Frost took part in a private IndyCar driver evaluation test at Sebring, driving for Dale Coyne.

Frost rejoined HMD with Dale Coyne for the 2023 season, with the series now re-named Indy NXT. At the season opener in St. Petersburg, Frost squeezed past Nolan Siegel at the final restart to take victory. Frost had to wait until race 12 at Portland, where he placed third, to finish on the podium again. He ended up sixth overall, having scored another podium at the Laguna Seca finale.

== Sportscar career ==
Frost made his sports car racing debut in early 2020, driving in the LMP2 class for Inter Europol during the final two rounds of the 2019–20 Asian Le Mans Series.

In 2023, Frost competed at the 2023 24 Hours of Daytona, piloting an LMP3 car for MRS GT-Racing.

At the end of 2023, Frost drove for Cool Racing in the opening rounds of the 2023–24 Asian Le Mans Series. He, alongside James Winslow and Alexander Bukhantsov, won the five-car LMP3 class in race 1 at Sepang. They finished third in race 2 after serving a drive-through penalty for an unsafe pit release. Frost did not return for the final three races, announcing in early 2024 that his racing career would be placed on hold as he would complete his required two years of military service for his home country of Singapore. He returned to racing in a one-off midway through 2024, contesting the Hockenheimring round of the Ultimate Cup Series, placing third.

Frost returned to the Asian Le Mans Series's LMP3 class in 2024–25, driving for Graff Racing alongside his previous teammates Winslow and Bukhantsov. They ended up sixth in the seven-car standings, having scored a third place each at Sepang and Abu Dhabi.

During 2025, Frost contested four rounds of the GT World Challenge Asia, partnering Liang Jiatong at Craft-Bamboo Racing. They scored one podium, third in race 2 at Mandalika, which also gave them the silver class win. Frost also took part in the final round of the Porsche Carrera Cup Asia, finishing in the top eight in the two support races for the 2025 Singapore Grand Prix.

Early in 2026, Frost drove for R-ace GP at the 4 Hours of Dubai. He was subsequently announced by R-ace GP to be partnering Enzo Peugeot in the 2026 Le Mans Cup. The pair won the season opener at Barcelona, before placing second at Le Castellet to retain their championship lead. They then finished fourth at the three-hour Road to Le Mans event. An incident-filled race at Spa followed, where Frost and Peugeot inherited victory due to a five-second penalty for original winner Arthur Rogeon. By finishing second in the wet Silverstone race, the pair clinched the LMP3 title with one race to spare — they won in commanding fashion at Portimão to cap off the season. Frost subsequently took part in the post-season ELMS rookie test, driving the Oreca 07 LMP2 car for IDEC Sport.

== Racing record ==
=== Career summary ===
Season	Series	Team	Races	Wins	Poles	F/Laps	Podiums	Points	Position
2016–17	Formula 4 South East Asia Championship	Meritus.GP	30	7	1	4	18	317	5th
2017	Formula Masters China	Eurasia Racing	17	1	4	3	10	166	**3rd**
2017	F4 Japanese Championship	Zap Speed Racing Team	2	0	0	0	0	0	35th
2017	F4 Danish Championship	Vesti Motorsport	3	0	0	0	0	16	14th
2017–18	MRF Challenge Formula 2000 Championship	MRF Racing	16	0	0	0	1	83	6th
2017–18	Formula 4 South East Asia Championship	Meritus.GP	5	1	2	0	3	71	17th
2018	U.S. F2000 National Championship	Exclusive Autosport	7	0	0	0	0	77	17th
2018–19	MRF Challenge Formula 2000	MRF Racing	8	1	0	1	6	106	7th
2019	Indy Pro 2000 Championship	Exclusive Autosport	16	2	1	1	6	318	5th
2019–20	Asian Le Mans Series - LMP2	Inter Europol Endurance	2	0	0	0	0	16	8th
2020	Indy Pro 2000 Championship	Turn 3 Motorsport	17	1	1	1	6	329	**3rd**
2020	Formula Regional Americas Championship	Andretti Autosport	10	0	0	0	1	62	8th
2021	Indy Lights	Andretti Autosport	20	0	2	2	4	338	5th
2022	Indy Lights	HMD Motorsports with Dale Coyne Racing	14	1	0	0	1	382	7th
2023	Indy NXT	HMD Motorsports with Dale Coyne Racing	14	1	0	0	3	361	6th
2023	IMSA SportsCar Championship - LMP3	MRS GT-Racing	1	0	0	0	0	0	NC
2023–24	Asian Le Mans Series - LMP3	Cool Racing	2	1	0	0	2	40	6th
2024	Ultimate Cup Series - Proto P3	TS Corse	1	0	0	0	1	15	26th
2024–25	Asian Le Mans Series - LMP3	Graff Racing	6	0	0	0	2	50	10th
2025	GT World Challenge Asia	Craft-Bamboo Racing	8	0	0	0	1	23	25th
2025	Porsche Carrera Cup Asia	Toro Racing	2	0	0	0	0	0	NC†
2025–26	Asian Le Mans Series - LMP3	R-ace GP	2	0	0	0	0	12	17th
2026	Le Mans Cup - LMP3	R-ace GP	6	3	0	0	5	131	**1st**

^{*} Season still in progress.

=== Complete Formula Masters China results ===
(key) (Races in bold indicate pole position) (Races in italics indicate fastest lap)

Year	Entrant	1	2	3	4	5	6	7	8	9	10	11	12	13	14	15	16	17	18	DC	Points
2017	Eurasia Racing	**SEP1**; **1**; 2	SEP1; 2; 4	SEP1; 3; 2	SEP1; 4; 2	SEP2; 1; 3	SEP2; 2; 5	SEP2; 3; 2	SEP2; 4; 5	ZIC1; 1 Ret	ZIC1; 2; 6	**ZIC1**; **3** DNS	ZIC2; 1; 6	**ZIC2**; **2**; 1	ZIC2; 3; 5	SIC; 1; 3	SIC; 2; 3	SIC; 3; 3	SIC; 4; 3	3rd	166

=== Complete F4 Japanese Championship results ===
(key) (Races in bold indicate pole position) (Races in italics indicate fastest lap)

Year	Team	1	2	3	4	5	6	7	8	9	10	11	12	13	14	DC	Pts
2017	Zap Speed Racing Team	OKA; 1	OKA; 2	FUJ1; 1	FUJ1; 2	AUT; 1	AUT; 2	SUG; 1	SUG; 2	FUJ2; 1	FUJ2; 2	SUZ; 1	SUZ; 2	MOT; 1; 18	MOT; 2; 21	35th	0

=== American open–wheel racing results ===
==== U.S. F2000 Championship ====
Year	Team	1	2	3	4	5	6	7	8	9	10	11	12	13	14	Rank	Points
2018	Exclusive Autosport	STP	STP	IMS	IMS	LOR	ROA; 19	ROA; 16	TOR; 8	TOR; 4	MOH; 7	MOH; 9	MOH; 9	POR	POR	17th	77

==== Indy Pro 2000 Championship ====
Year	Team	1	2	3	4	5	6	7	8	9	10	11	12	13	14	15	16	17	Rank	Points
2019	Exclusive Autosport	STP; 4	STP; 3	IMS; 3	IMS; 3	LOR; 1	ROA; 11	ROA; 12	TOR; 1	TOR; 4	MOH; 13	MOH; 6	GTW; 4	POR; 2	POR; 6	LAG; 6	LAG; 12		5th	318
2020	Turn 3 Motorsport	ROA; 1	ROA; 3	MOH; 2	MOH; 8	MOH; 11	LOR; 5	GMP; 5	IMS; 5	IMS; 5	IMS; 9	MOH; 2	MOH; 5	NJM; 12	NJM; 5	NJM; 7	STP; 2	STP; 3	3rd	329

==== Indy Lights/Indy NXT ====
(key) (Races in bold indicate pole position) (Races in italics indicate fastest lap) (Races with ^{L} indicate a race lap led) (Races with * indicate most race laps led)

Year	Team	1	2	3	4	5	6	7	8	9	10	11	12	13	14	15	16	17	18	19	20	Rank	Points
2021	Andretti Autosport	ALA; 1; 7	ALA; 2; 12	STP; 1; 2	STP; 2; 4	IMS; 1; 7	IMS; 2; 6	DET; 1; 6	DET; 2; 12	**RDA**; **1**; 11	**RDA**; **2**; 3	MOH; 1; 2	**MOH**; **2**; 2	GTW; 1; 6	GTW; 2; 10	POR; 1; 8	POR; 2; 6	LAG; 1; 9	LAG; 2; 4	MOH; 3; 4	MOH; 4; 6	5th	338
2022	HMD Motorsports with Dale Coyne Racing	STP; 5	ALA; 4	IMS; 1; 1^{L}*	IMS; 2; 7	DET; 1; 10	DET; 2; 5	RDA; 8	MOH; 13	IOW; 7	NSH; 10	GTW; 4	POR; 10	LAG; 1; 7	LAG; 2; 7							7th	382
2023	HMD Motorsports with Dale Coyne Racing	STP; 1^{L}	BAR; 10	IMS; 11	DET; 18	DET; 5	RDA; 7	MOH; 11	IOW; 14	NSH; 16	IMS; 7	GMP; 5	POR; 3	LAG; 3	LAG; 6							6th	361

=== Complete WeatherTech SportsCar Championship results ===
(key) (Races in bold indicate pole position; races in italics indicate fastest lap)

Year	Entrant	Class	Make	Engine	1	2	3	4	5	6	7	Rank	Points
2023	MRS GT-Racing	LMP3	Ligier JS P320	Nissan VK56DE 5.6 L V8	DAY; 8†	SEB	WGL	MOS	ELK	IMS	PET	NC†	0†

^{†} Points only counted towards the Michelin Endurance Cup, and not the overall LMP3 Championship.

=== Complete Asian Le Mans Series results ===
(key) (Races in bold indicate pole position) (Races in italics indicate fastest lap)

Year	Team	Class	Car	Engine	1	2	3	4	5	6	Pos.	Points
2019–20	Inter Europol Endurance	LMP2	Ligier JS P217	Gibson GK428 4.2 L V8	SHA	BEN	SEP; 6	BUR; 6			8th	16
2023–24	Cool Racing	LMP3	Ligier JS P320	Nissan VK56DE 5.6 L V8	SEP; 1; 1	SEP; 2; 3	DUB	ABU; 1	ABU; 2		6th	40
2024–25	Graff Racing	LMP3	Ligier JS P320	Nissan VK56DE 5.6 L V8	SEP; 1; 3	SEP; 2 Ret	DUB; 1; 6	DUB; 2; 4	ABU; 1; 3	ABU; 2 Ret	10th	50
2025–26	R-ace GP	LMP3	Duqueine D09	Toyota V35A 3.5 L Twin-Turbo V6	SEP; 1	SEP; 2	DUB; 1 Ret	DUB; 2; 4	ABU; 1	ABU; 2	17th	12

=== Complete Le Mans Cup results ===
(key) (Races in bold indicate pole position; results in italics indicate fastest lap)

Year	Entrant	Class	Chassis	1	2	3	4	5	6	Rank	Points
2026	R-ace GP	LMP3	Duqueine D09	**BAR**; 1	LEC; 2	LMS; 4	SPA; 1	SIL; 2	POR; 1	1st	131

^{*} Season still in progress.
