= Daniel Lu =

Chinese racing driver (born 2001)

- 陆文龙
- Born: Lu Wenlong; 9 May 2001 (age 25); Shanghai, China
- Nationality: (China) Chinese
- Categorisation: FIA Silver

Previous series
- 2018-19, 2021-24 2017 2017 2016–17: Porsche Carrera Cup Asia; Euroformula Open Championship; Formula Masters China; Formula 4 South East Asia Championship

Championship titles
- 2021: Porsche Carrera Cup Asia

Daniel Lu Wenlong (Chinese: 陆文龙; pinyin: Lù Wén Lóng; born 9 May 2001), also previously known as Daniel Hibbitt, is a Chinese and British racing driver currently competing for Absolute Racing in GT World Challenge Asia.

== Personal life and education ==
Lu was born in Shanghai on 9 May 2001 to a British father and a Chinese mother, and was named "Dragon" by his grandparents. He has a younger brother, Nathan Lu Wenhu, who is four years his junior and is a fellow racing driver.

Lu also attended the British International School of Shanghai and the University of Devon.

== Career ==
Lu began his karting career at the age of fourteen and most notably won the Rotax Max Kart Challenge China Cup Youth Division in 2015. In early 2017, he made his single-seater debut at the Buriram round of the 2016–17 Formula 4 South East Asia Championship.

For the rest of 2017, Lu competed for Absolute Racing in Formula Masters China, in which he took eight wins on his way to runner-up in points, three behind Taylor Cockerton. Alongside his Formula Masters China commitments, Lu competed in all but one rounds of the Asian Formula Renault Series for Asia Racing Team, taking four wins to finish second in points and winning the Renault Road to Champion class. During 2017, Lu also competed for BVM Racing in the Monza and Jerez rounds of the Euroformula Open Championship.

Despite testing Formula Renault machinery in Europe at the end of 2017, Lu became a Porsche China Young Driver and switched to Porsche Carrera Cup Asia for 2018. In his rookie year in the series, Lu scored a best result of fourth at Fuji en route to a seventh-place points finish.

Returning to Porsche Carrera Cup Asia as a Porsche China junior for 2019, Lu won in Singapore en route to a fourth-place points finish. During 2019, Lu also raced part-time in the China GT Championship, winning at Shanghai and Ningbo in the GTC class alongside Jacky Wu. Initially signing with Team Jebsen for the following year, Lu joined them in 2021 after the previous season was cancelled due to the pandemic. In his third full-tims season in the series, Lu won four races and clinched the Porsche Carrera Cup Asia title at season's end.

Following a two-year hiatus, Lu returned to racing in 2024 by competing for EBM in one-off appearances in Porsche Carrera Cup Asia and GT World Challenge Asia. The following year, Lu joined Absolute Racing as one of the team's two Porsches for their campaign in GT World Challenge Asia, whilst also returning to the China GT Championship. Obtaining only one class podium among the two campaigns, Lu found more success in SRO GT Cup for Team Pegasus, in which he won in Beijing and Macau to end the season runner-up in the Silver Cup points.

== Racing record ==
=== Racing career summary ===
| Season | Series | Team | Races | Wins | Poles | F/Laps | Podiums | Points | Position |
|---|---|---|---|---|---|---|---|---|---|
| 2016–17 | Formula 4 South East Asia Championship | Meritus.GP | 7 | 0 | 0 | 0 | 1 | 0 | NC |
| 2017 | Formula Masters China | Absolute Racing | 18 | 7 | 3 | 4 | 11 | 218 | **2nd** |
| 2017 | Asian Formula Renault Series – Class A | Asia Racing Team | 10 | 4 | 4 | 4 | 8 | 231 | **2nd** |
| 2017 | Euroformula Open Championship | BVM Racing | 4 | 0 | 0 | 0 | 0 | 0 | 25th |
| 2017–18 | Porsche GT3 Challenge Middle East | | 4 | 0 | 0 | 0 | 1 | 59 | 17th |
| 2018 | Porsche Carrera Cup Asia | Porsche China Junior Team | 13 | 0 | 0 | 0 | 0 | 98 | 7th |
| 2018–19 | Asian Le Mans Series – GTC | EKS Motorsports | 1 | 0 | 0 | 0 | 1 | 18 | **2nd** |
| 2019 | Porsche Carrera Cup Asia | Porsche China Junior Team | 14 | 1 | 0 | 0 | 2 | 166 | 4th |
| 2019 | China GT Championship – GTC | | 2 | 0 | 0 | 0 | 2 | 28 | 10th |
| 2020 | China Endurance Championship – GT3 Pro-Am | FFA Racing | ? | ? | ? | ? | ? | ? | **3rd** |
| 2021 | Porsche Carrera Cup Asia | Team Jebsen | 15 | 4 | 1 | 0 | 10 | 284 | **1st** |
| 2022 | Porsche Carrera Cup Asia | Climax Racing | 8 | ? | ? | ? | ? | 72 | 7th |
| 2023 | Shanghai 8 Hours – GTC | Z.SPEED | 1 | 1 | 1 | ? | 1 | —N/a | **1st** |
| 2023 | Thailand Super Series – GT3 | Absolute B-Quik Racing | 2 | 0 | ? | 0 | 1 | 0 | NC† |
| 2024 | Porsche Carrera Cup Asia | EBM Giga Racing | 3 | 0 | 0 | 0 | 0 | 0 | NC |
| 2024 | GT World Challenge Asia | EBM | 2 | 0 | 0 | 0 | 0 | 0 | NC† |
| 2024 | GT World Challenge Asia – Silver-Am | EBM | 2 | 0 | 0 | 0 | 0 | 0 | NC† |
| 2024 | Thailand Super Series – GT3 | Absolute B-Quik Racing | 2 | 1 | ? | 0 | 1 | 35 | 12th |
| 2025 | China GT Championship – GT3 | 610 Racing | 4 | 0 | 0 | 0 | 0 | 0 | NC |
| 2025 | GT World Challenge Asia | Absolute Racing | 12 | 0 | 0 | 0 | 0 | 1 | 48th |
| 2025 | GT World Challenge Asia – Silver-Am | Absolute Racing | 10 | 0 | 0 | 0 | 1 | 73 | 11th |
| 2025 | GT World Challenge Asia – Silver | Absolute Racing | 2 | 0 | 0 | 0 | 0 | 24 | 9th |
| 2025 | SRO GT Cup | Team Pegasus | 5 | 2 | 2 | 0 | 3 | 78 | **2nd** |
| 2025 | SRO GT Cup – Silver | Team Pegasus | 5 | 2 | 2 | 0 | 3 | 86 | **2nd** |
| 2025 | Greater Bay Area GT Cup | Team Pegasus | 1 | 1 | 0 | 0 | 1 | —N/a | **1st** |
| 2026 | China GT Championship – GT3 | Bad Guy Racing | | | | | | * | * |
| 2026 | China GT Championship – GTS | Phantom Global Racing | | | | | | | |
| 2026 | China GT Championship – GTS Pro-Am | Phantom Global Racing | | | | | | | |

^{†} As Lu was a guest driver, he was ineligible for points.

=== Complete Formula Masters China results ===
(key) (Races in bold indicate pole position) (Races in italics indicate fastest lap)

| Year | Entrant | 1 | 2 | 3 | 4 | 5 | 6 | 7 | 8 | 9 | 10 | 11 | 12 | 13 | 14 | 15 | 16 | 17 | 18 | DC | Points |
|---|---|---|---|---|---|---|---|---|---|---|---|---|---|---|---|---|---|---|---|---|---|
| 2017 | Absolute Racing | SEP1; 1; 1 | SEP1; 2; 1 | SEP1; 3; 3 | **SEP1**; **4**; 1 | SEP2; 1; 8 | SEP2; 2; 1 | SEP2; 3; 4 | SEP2; 4; 3 | ZIC1; 1; 1 | ZIC1; 2 Ret | ZIC1; 3; 2 | ZIC2; 1; 10 | ZIC2; 2; 2 | **ZIC2**; **3**; 1 | **SIC**; **1**; 1 | SIC; 2; 4 | SIC; 3; 4 | SIC; 4; 5 | 2nd | 218 |

=== Complete Euroformula Open Championship results ===
(key) (Races in bold indicate pole position; races in italics indicate points for the fastest lap of top ten finishers)

| Year | Entrant | 1 | 2 | 3 | 4 | 5 | 6 | 7 | 8 | 9 | 10 | 11 | 12 | 13 | 14 | 15 | 16 | DC | Points |
|---|---|---|---|---|---|---|---|---|---|---|---|---|---|---|---|---|---|---|---|
| 2017 | BVM Racing | EST; 1 | EST; 2 | SPA; 1 | SPA; 2 | LEC; 1 | LEC; 2 | HUN; 1 | HUN; 2 | SIL; 1 | SIL; 2 | MNZ; 1; 16 | MNZ; 2; 15 | JER; 1 Ret | JER; 2; 16 | CAT; 1 | CAT; 2 | 25th | 0 |

=== Complete Asian Le Mans Series results ===
(key) (Races in bold indicate pole position) (Races in italics indicate fastest lap)

| Year | Team | Class | Car | Engine | 1 | 2 | 3 | 4 | Pos. | Points |
|---|---|---|---|---|---|---|---|---|---|---|
| 2018–19 | EKS Motorsports | GTC | Porsche 991 GT3 Cup | Porsche 4.0 L Flat-6 | SHA; 2 | FUJ | CHA | SEP | 2nd | 18 |

=== Complete GT World Challenge Asia results ===
(key) (Races in bold indicate pole position) (Races in italics indicate fastest lap)

| Year | Team | Car | Class | 1 | 2 | 3 | 4 | 5 | 6 | 7 | 8 | 9 | 10 | 11 | 12 | DC | Points |
|---|---|---|---|---|---|---|---|---|---|---|---|---|---|---|---|---|---|
| 2024 | EBM | Porsche 911 GT3 R (992) | Silver-Am | SEP; 1 | SEP; 2 | BUR; 1 | BUR; 2 | FUJ; 1 | FUJ; 2 | SUZ; 1 | SUZ; 2 | OKA; 1 | OKA; 2 | SIC; 1; 4 | SIC; 2; 7 | NC† | 0† |
| 2025 | Absolute Racing | Porsche 911 GT3 R (992) | Silver-Am | SEP; 1; 3 | SEP; 2; 5 | MAN; 1; 8 | MAN; 2; 4 | BUR; 1; 9 | BUR; 2; 9 | FUJ; 1 Ret | FUJ; 2; 6 | OKA; 1; 6 | OKA; 2; 4 | | | 11th | 73 |
| 2025 | Absolute Racing | Porsche 911 GT3 R (992) | Silver | | | | | | | | | | | BEI; 1; 4 | BEI; 2; 4 | 9th | 24 |
