= Louis Prette =

Monégasque-Italian racing driver

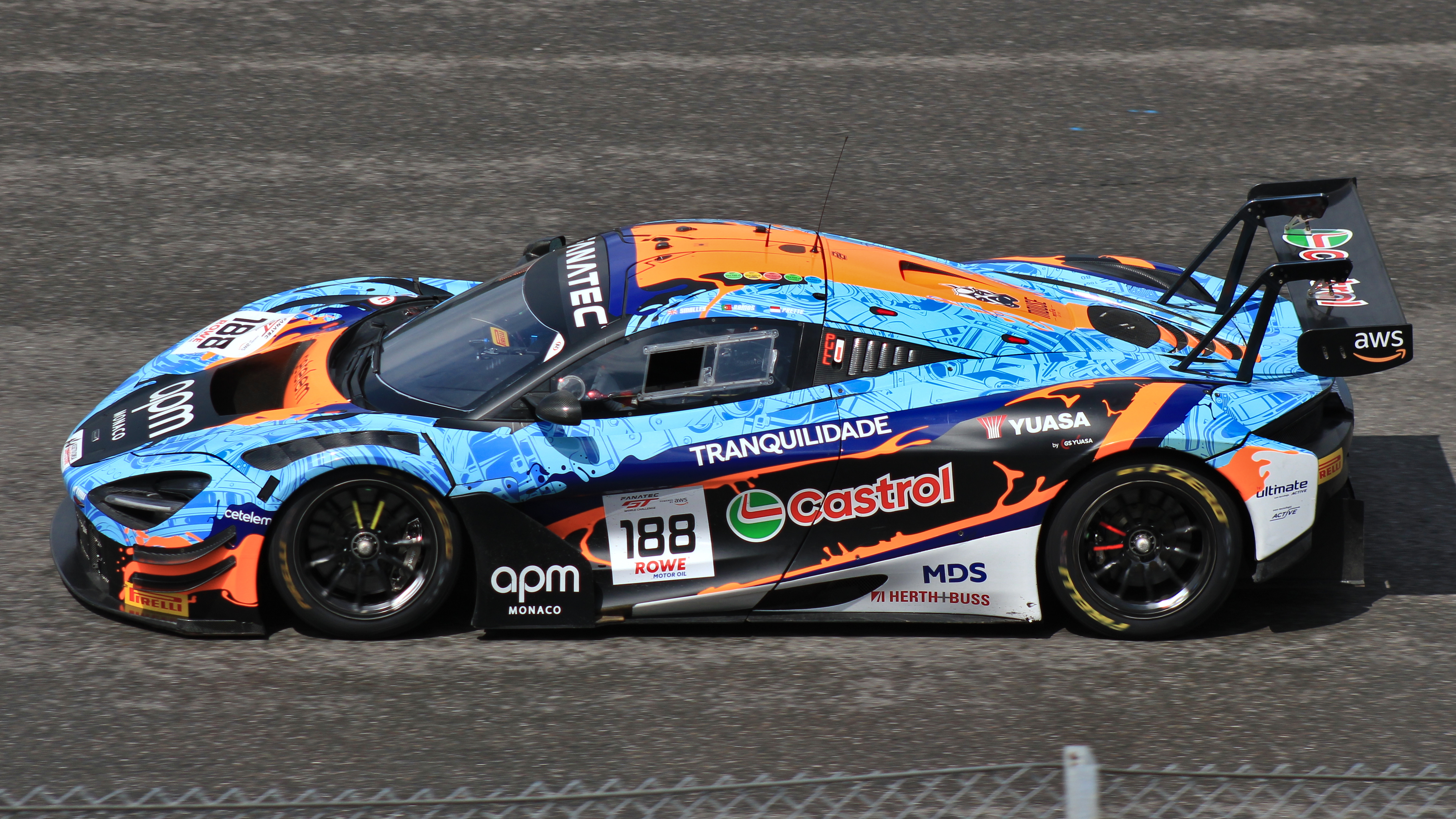
- Nationality: (Monaco) Monégasque (Italy) Italian via dual nationality
- Born: 31 July 1998 (age 28) Monte Carlo, Monaco
- Relatives: Philippe Prette (father)

International GT Open
- Categorisation: FIA Silver
- Years active: 2020
- Teams: AF Corse
- Starts: 5
- Wins: 2
- Poles: 1
- Fastest laps: 0

Previous series
- 2016–17 2018 2019: Asian Formula Renault Series; F3 Asian Championship; Ferrari Challenge Europe – Trofeo Pirelli (Pro)

Championship titles
- 2019: Ferrari Challenge Europe – Trofeo Pirelli (Pro)

Louis Prette Jr. (born 31 July 1998 in Monte Carlo) is a Monégasque and Italian racing driver who competes in GT World Challenge Europe for Garage 59 as a McLaren junior. He is also the general manager of APM Monaco, his family business.

Prette is mentored by 1998 24 Hours of Le Mans winner and fellow Monégasque Stéphane Ortelli.

== Biography ==
Given his father Philippe's unprecedented success in Ferrari Challenge Asia-Pacific, Prette's career began in Asia with the Asian Formula Renault Series in 2016. Having taken third in the championship the following year, he graduated to Asian Formula 3, where he finished ninth in the standings before moving into GT racing – returning to Europe and following in his father's footsteps by contesting the European Ferrari Challenge, winning the championship by three points. He progressed to GT3 competition in 2020, entering the International GT Open series with Vincent Abril.

Outside of racing, Prette serves as general manager at his grandmother Ariane's fashion jewelry company APM Monaco, based in Hong Kong.

== Racing record ==
=== Career summary ===
Season	Series	Team	Races	Wins	Poles	F/Laps	Podiums	Points	Position
2016	Asian Formula Renault Series	S&D Motorsports	2	0	0	0	0	24	16th
2016-17	Asian Le Mans Series - LMP3	PS Racing	2	0	0	0	0	6	16th
2017	Asian Formula Renault Series	BlackArts Racing Team	12	0	1	0	5	192	**3rd**
2017	F4 Chinese Championship	BlackArts Racing Team	3	0	0	0	0	26	17th
2017-18	Asian Le Mans Series - LMP3	KCMG	4	2	0	2	2	54	**2nd**
2018	F3 Asian Championship	BlackArts Racing Team	15	0	0	0	0	70	9th
2018	Asian Formula Renault Series	PS Racing	2	0	1	0	0	0	NC†
2018	Ferrari Challenge Europe - Trofeo Pirelli (Pro)	Formula Racing	2	0	1	0	1	24	11th
2019	Ferrari Challenge Europe – Trofeo Pirelli (Pro)	Formula Racing	13	3	3	4	7	173	**1st**
2019	Ferrari Challenge Finali Mondiali – Trofeo Pirelli (Pro)	Formula Racing	1	0	0	0	0	0	6th
2019	24 Hours of Le Mans - LMGTE Am	Proton Competition	1	0	0	0	0	N/A	6th
2020	International GT Open	AF Corse/APM Monaco	12	4	3	1	5	110	**3rd**
2021	GT World Challenge Europe Endurance Cup	Saintéloc Racing	1	0	0	0	0	0	NC
2021	GT World Challenge Europe Endurance Cup - Silver	Saintéloc Racing	1	0	0	0	0	1	33rd
2022	Asian Le Mans Series - GT	AF Corse/APM Monaco	4	0	0	0	3	45	4th
2022	24 Hours of Le Mans - LMGTE Am	AF Corse	1	0	1	0	0	N/A	9th
2023	Asian Le Mans Series - GT	Garage 59	4	0	0	0	0	11	13th
2023	GT World Challenge Europe Endurance Cup	Garage 59	5	0	0	0	0	5	23rd
2023	GT World Challenge Europe Endurance Cup - Bronze	Garage 59	5	1	2	1	1	75	4th
2023	24 Hours of Le Mans - LMGTE Am	JMW Motorsport	1	0	0	0	0	N/A	DNF
2024	GT World Challenge Europe Endurance Cup	Garage 59	5	0	0	0	0	0	NC
2024	GT World Challenge Europe Endurance Cup - Bronze	Garage 59	4	0	2	0	0	11	27th
2024	GT World Challenge Europe Sprint Cup	Garage 59	8	0	0	0	0	0	NC
2024	GT World Challenge Europe Sprint Cup – Bronze	Garage 59	8	1	3	0	2	25.5	7th
2024	Gulf 12 Hours - Pro-Am	Garage 59	1	1	0	0	1	N/A	**1st**
2025	GT World Challenge Europe Endurance Cup	Garage 59	5	1	1	1	1	26	12th
2025	GT World Challenge Europe Endurance Cup - Gold	Garage 59	4	0	3	1	1	32	7th
2025	GT World Challenge Europe Sprint Cup	Garage 59	10	0	0	0	1	19	8th
2025	GT World Challenge Europe Sprint Cup – Gold	Garage 59	10	3	2	1	6	106	**2nd**
2026	6H of Portimão	Greystone GT	1	1	1	0	1	N/A	**1st**
2026	GT World Challenge Europe Endurance Cup	Garage 59	5	0	0	0	1	32	7th
2026	GT World Challenge Europe Sprint Cup	Garage 59	10	1	0	1	1	19.5	15th
2026	Shanghai 8 Hours	Phantom Global Racing	1	0	0	0	0	N/A	10th

=== Complete F3 Asian Championship results ===
(key) (Races in bold indicate pole position) (Races in italics indicate fastest lap)

Year	Entrant	1	2	3	4	5	6	7	8	9	10	11	12	13	14	15	Pos	Points
2018	BlackArts Racing Team	SEP1; 1; 7	SEP1; 2; 9	SEP1; 3; 7	NIS1; 1; 12	NIS1; 2; 7	NIS1; 3; 8	SIC; 1 Ret	SIC; 2; 7	SIC; 3; 5	NIS2; 1 Ret	NIS2; 2; 8	NIS2; 3; 5	SEP2; 1; 11	SEP2; 2; 5	SEP2; 3; 7	9th	70

=== Complete 24 Hours of Le Mans results ===
Year	Team	Co-Drivers	Car	Class	Laps	Pos.	Class Pos.
2019	(Germany) Proton Competition	(Monaco) Vincent Abril (Monaco) Philippe Prette	Porsche 911 RSR	GTE; Am	332	36th	6th
2022	(Italy) AF Corse	(Monaco) Vincent Abril (United States) Conrad Grunewald	Ferrari 488 GTE Evo	GTE; Am	339	42nd	9th
2023	(United Kingdom) JMW Motorsport	(France) Thomas Neubauer (Italy) Giacomo Petrobelli	Ferrari 488 GTE Evo	GTE; Am	89	DNF	DNF

=== Complete International GT Open results ===
(key) (Races in bold indicate pole position; results in italics indicate fastest lap)

Year	Entrant	Class	Chassis	1	2	3	4	5	6	7	8	9	10	11	12	Rank	Points
2020	AF Corse/APM Monaco	Pro	Ferrari 488 GT3 Evo 2020	HUN; 1 Ret	HUN; 2; 1	LEC; 1; 4	**LEC**; **2**; 1	RBR; 1; 4	RBR; 2; 2	MNZ; 1; 7	MNZ; 2; 1	SPA; 1; 1	**SPA**; **2**; 4	CAT; 1; 4	**CAT**; **2**; 12	3rd	110

=== Complete GT World Challenge Europe results ===
==== GT World Challenge Europe Endurance Cup ====
(Races in bold indicate pole position) (Races in italics indicate fastest lap)

Year	Team	Car	Class	1	2	3	4	5	6	7	Pos.	Points
2021	Saintéloc Racing	Audi R8 LMS Evo	Silver	MNZ	LEC	SPA; 6H; 45	SPA; 12H; 30	SPA; 24H; 29	NÜR	CAT	33rd	1
2023	Garage 59	McLaren 720S GT3 Evo	Bronze	**MNZ**; 20	**LEC**; 33†	SPA; 6H; 11	SPA; 12H; 5	SPA; 24H; 34	NÜR; 25	CAT; 18	4th	75
2024	Garage 59	McLaren 720S GT3 Evo	Bronze	**LEC**; 38	SPA; 6H; 46	SPA; 12H; 42	**SPA**; **24H**; 39	NÜR; 34	MNZ; Ret		27th	11
2024	Garage 59	McLaren 720S GT3 Evo	Pro							JED; 16	NC	0
2025	Garage 59	McLaren 720S GT3 Evo	Gold	**LEC**; Ret	**MNZ**; Ret	SPA; 6H; 28	SPA; 12H; 15	SPA; 24H; 12	**NÜR**; Ret	**CAT**; 1	4th	58
2026	Garage 59	McLaren 720S GT3 Evo	Gold	**LEC**; 3	MNZ; 18	SPA; 6H; 4	SPA; 12H; 3	**SPA**; **24H**; 36	**NÜR**; Ret	ALG; DSQ	3rd	86

==== GT World Challenge Europe Sprint Cup ====
(key) (Races in bold indicate pole position) (Races in italics indicate fastest lap)

Year	Team	Car	Class	1	2	3	4	5	6	7	8	9	10	Pos.	Points
2024	Garage 59	McLaren 720S GT3 Evo	Bronze	BRH; 1	BRH; 2	MIS; 1; 23	MIS; 2; 25	**HOC**; **1** Ret	**HOC**; **2**; 27	MAG; 1; 30†	**MAG**; **2**; 20	CAT; 1; 18	CAT; 2 Ret	7th	25.5
2025	Garage 59	McLaren 720S GT3 Evo	Gold	BRH; 1; 8	BRH; 2; 15	ZAN; 1 Ret	ZAN; 2; 25	MIS; 1; 10	MIS; 2; 19	MAG; 1; 6	MAG; 2; 12	**VAL**; **1**; 2	**VAL**; **2**; 15	2nd	106
2026	Garage 59	McLaren 720S GT3 Evo	Gold	BRH; 1; 8	BRH; 2 Ret	MIS; 1; 12	MIS; 2; 9	MAG; 1; 12	MAG; 2; 16	**ZAN**; **1**; 1	**ZAN**; **2**; 25	CAT; 1; 24	CAT; 2; 35	3rd	83.5

^{†} Driver did not finish the race, but was classified as he completed over 90% of the race distance.
