= 2017–18 MRF Challenge Formula 2000 Championship =

Auto racing championship of India

The 2017–18 MRF Challenge Formula 2000 Championship was the fifth running of the MRF Challenge Formula 2000 Championship. It began on 16 November 2017 at the Bahrain International Circuit in Sakhir, Bahrain and ended on 4 February 2018 at the Madras Motor Racing Track in Chennai, India. The series consisted of 16 races spread across four meetings, with the first round in Bahrain being a support event to the FIA World Endurance Championship.

== Drivers ==
No.	Driver	Rounds
3	(Australia) Dylan Young	All
4	(Sweden) Henning Enqvist	All
5	(France) Louis Gachot	2–4
8	(Belgium) Michelangelo Amendola	All
9	(United States) Robert Megennis	All
10	(Germany) Richard Wagner	All
11	(Brazil) Felipe Drugovich	All
12	(Venezuela) Manuel Maldonado	All
14	(France) Christophe Mariot	1
17	(Malaysia) Nazim Azman	All
20	(Netherlands) Rinus van Kalmthout	All
21	(Australia) Harri Jones	All
22	(Poland) Alex Karkosik	All
26	(France) Julien Falchero	All
28	(Singapore) Pavan Ravishankar	All
32	(Indonesia) Presley Martono	All
69	(Indonesia) Perdana Putra Minang	All
88	(Singapore) Danial Frost	All
96	(Australia) Kurt Hill	All

== Calendar and results ==
Round		Circuit	Date	Pole position	Fastest lap	Winning driver
2017
1	R1	Bahrain International Circuit, Sakhir	17 November	(Netherlands) Rinus van Kalmthout	(Indonesia) Presley Martono	(Brazil) Felipe Drugovich
1	R2	Bahrain International Circuit, Sakhir	17 November		(Netherlands) Rinus van Kalmthout	(Brazil) Felipe Drugovich
1	R3	Bahrain International Circuit, Sakhir	18 November	(Netherlands) Rinus van Kalmthout	(Netherlands) Rinus van Kalmthout	(Netherlands) Rinus van Kalmthout
1	R4	Bahrain International Circuit, Sakhir	18 November		(France) Julien Falchero	(France) Julien Falchero
2	R1	(United Arab Emirates) Dubai Autodrome, Dubai	8 December	(Indonesia) Presley Martono	(Netherlands) Rinus van Kalmthout	(Brazil) Felipe Drugovich
2	R2	(United Arab Emirates) Dubai Autodrome, Dubai	8 December		(Netherlands) Rinus van Kalmthout	(Netherlands) Rinus van Kalmthout
2	R3	(United Arab Emirates) Dubai Autodrome, Dubai	9 December	(Indonesia) Presley Martono	(Netherlands) Rinus van Kalmthout	(Brazil) Felipe Drugovich
2	R4	(United Arab Emirates) Dubai Autodrome, Dubai	9 December		(Indonesia) Presley Martono	(Indonesia) Presley Martono
3	R1	(United Arab Emirates) Yas Marina Circuit, Abu Dhabi	14 December	(Brazil) Felipe Drugovich	(Brazil) Felipe Drugovich	(Brazil) Felipe Drugovich
3	R2	(United Arab Emirates) Yas Marina Circuit, Abu Dhabi	15 December		(Brazil) Felipe Drugovich	(Brazil) Felipe Drugovich
3	R3	(United Arab Emirates) Yas Marina Circuit, Abu Dhabi	15 December	(Brazil) Felipe Drugovich	(Brazil) Felipe Drugovich	(Brazil) Felipe Drugovich
3	R4	(United Arab Emirates) Yas Marina Circuit, Abu Dhabi	15 December		(Brazil) Felipe Drugovich	(Brazil) Felipe Drugovich
2018
4	R1	(India) Madras Motor Racing Track, Chennai	3 February	(Indonesia) Presley Martono	(Netherlands) Rinus van Kalmthout	(Netherlands) Rinus van Kalmthout
4	R2	(India) Madras Motor Racing Track, Chennai	3 February		(Netherlands) Rinus van Kalmthout	(Indonesia) Presley Martono
4	R3	(India) Madras Motor Racing Track, Chennai	4 February	(Indonesia) Presley Martono	(Brazil) Felipe Drugovich	(Brazil) Felipe Drugovich
4	R4	(India) Madras Motor Racing Track, Chennai	4 February		(Indonesia) Presley Martono	(Brazil) Felipe Drugovich

== Championship standings ==
Scoring system

Position	1st	2nd	3rd	4th	5th	6th	7th	8th	9th	10th	R1 PP	FL
Points	25	18	15	12	10	8	6	4	2	1	2	2

Drivers' standings

Pos.	Driver	BHR (Bahrain)				DUB (United Arab Emirates)				YMC (United Arab Emirates)				CHE (India)				Points
1	(Brazil) Felipe Drugovich	1	1	2	4	1	9	1	2	**1**	1	**1**	1	3	6	1	1	335
2	(Indonesia) Presley Martono	2	2	5	3	**5**	4	**2**	1	2	4	15	4	**2**	1	**2**	3	254
3	(Netherlands) Rinus van Kalmthout	**Ret**	4	**1**	2	3	1	9	3	Ret	6	3	2	1	2	3	2	245
4	(France) Julien Falchero	6	3	3	1	4	3	DSQ	5	3	2	2	3	4	Ret	6	7	194
5	(Poland) Alex Karkosik	4	12	4	5	2	8	3	DSQ	5	3	Ret	5	6	Ret	7	9	122
6	(Singapore) Danial Frost	14	9	9	DSQ	9	5	DSQ	Ret	6	Ret	7	6	5	3	4	6	83
7	(Australia) Harri Jones	Ret	14	10	13	7	6	DSQ	4	13	8	6	9	9	4	10	5	66
8	(Australia) Dylan Young	3	7	6	Ret	10	11	12	11	7	7	10	7	8	5	9	11	65
9	(France) Louis Gachot					6	2	10	8	4	16	DNS	DNS	Ret	7	5	8	63
10	(United States) Robert Megennis	7	5	13	12	17	14	4	7	8	17	9	14	11	9	11	4	54
11	(Belgium) Michelangelo Amendola	10	8	12	NC	8	7	5	6	Ret	11	4	8	10	8	13	18	54
12	(Venezuela) Manuel Maldonado	5	DSQ	15	6	Ret	13	6	10	11	10	5	11	12	Ret	12	10	39
13	(Malaysia) Nazim Azman	8	Ret	11	7	12	10	7	Ret	12	5	13	17	15	13	Ret	15	27
14	(Singapore) Pavan Ravishankar	9	6	7	9	16	15	8	DSQ	14	14	14	16	14	Ret	8	12	26
15	(Sweden) Henning Enqvist	11	15	8	Ret	11	12	15	9	10	9	8	10	10	10	14	13	16
16	(Indonesia) Perdana Putra Minang	13	10	17	8	13	17	11	12	9	15	16	13	13	Ret	16	14	7
17	(Germany) Richard Wagner	12	17	16	10	15	16	13	14	Ret	12	11	15	16	11	15	17	1
18	(Australia) Kurt Hill	Ret	Ret	14	14	14	18	14	13	15	13	12	12	17	12	Ret	16	0
19	(France) Christophe Mariot	15	16	18	15													0
Pos.	Driver	BHR (Bahrain)				DUB (United Arab Emirates)				YMC (United Arab Emirates)				CHE (India)				Points

Colour	Result
Gold	Winner
Silver	Second place
Bronze	Third place
Green	Points classification
Blue	Non-points classification
Blue	Non-classified finish (NC)
Purple	Retired, not classified (Ret)
Red	Did not qualify (DNQ)
Red	Did not pre-qualify (DNPQ)
Black	Disqualified (DSQ)
White	Did not start (DNS)
White	Withdrew (WD)
White	Race cancelled (C)
Blank	Did not practice (DNP)
Blank	Did not arrive (DNA)
Blank	Excluded (EX)

**Bold** – Pole
Italics – Fastest Lap
