= 2017 Formula Masters China =

The 2017 Formula Masters Series season was the seventh and final season of the Formula Pilota China series, and the first under the Formula Masters Series branding. The championship began on 8 April at the Sepang International Circuit in Malaysia and finished on 24 September at the Shanghai International Circuit in China, after eighteen races held at five meetings.

== Teams and drivers ==
| Team | No. | Driver | Class | Rounds |
|---|---|---|---|---|
| (Hong Kong) Absolute Racing | 5 | (China) "James" Yu Kuai | | All |
| (Hong Kong) Absolute Racing | 9 | (Mexico) Manuel Cabrera | | All |
| (Hong Kong) Absolute Racing | 27 | (Sweden) Arvin Esmaeili | | All |
| (Hong Kong) Absolute Racing | 55 | (China) "Daniel" Lu Wenlong | | All |
| (Japan) Super License Team | 6 | (Japan) Tomoki Takahashi | | 2–5 |
| (Japan) Super License Team | 7 | (Japan) Takashi Hata | M | 1 |
| (China) Linky Racing | 8 | (China) Hu Nan | M | All |
| (China) Linky Racing | 14 | (China) Zhang Yaqi | M | All |
| (China) Linky Racing | 44 | (China) Luo Kailuo | | All |
| (Philippines) Cebu Pacific Air by PRT | 11 | (New Zealand) Taylor Cockerton | | All |
| (Philippines) Cebu Pacific Air by PRT | 12 | (Philippines) Ben Grimes | | All |
| (Philippines) Cebu Pacific Air by PRT | 13 | (Spain) Antolín González | | 1–3 |
| (Philippines) Cebu Pacific Air by PRT | 17 | (China) "Billy" Zheng Jiannian | | 5 |
| (Philippines) Eurasia Racing | 19 | (Malaysia) Isyraf Danish | | 1–2 |
| (Philippines) Eurasia Racing | 20 | (Philippines) Angie King | M | 3 |
| (Philippines) Eurasia Racing | 20 | (Malaysia) Nazim Azman | | 4 |
| (Philippines) Eurasia Racing | 23 | (China) Liu Zexuan | M | 3 |
| (Philippines) Eurasia Racing | 66 | (Singapore) Danial Frost | | All |
| (Philippines) Eurasia Racing | 96 | (Australia) Kurt Hill | | All |

| Icon | Meaning |
|---|---|
| M | Master class |

== Race calendar and results ==
The definitive race calendar was confirmed on 6 April 2017. As per the regulations, each round will have two to three 25-minute races and one shorter 15-minute race, with a different set of points awarded for each format. Races denoted with a blue background are 15-minute races.

| Round | | Circuit | Date | Pole position | Fastest lap | Winning driver | Winning team |
|---|---|---|---|---|---|---|---|
| 1 | R1 | (Malaysia) Sepang International Circuit | 8 April | (Singapore) Danial Frost | (Malaysia) Isyraf Danish | (China) Daniel Lu | (Hong Kong) Absolute Racing |
| 1 | R2 | (Malaysia) Sepang International Circuit | 8 April | (Malaysia) Isyraf Danish | (New Zealand) Taylor Cockerton | (China) Daniel Lu | (Hong Kong) Absolute Racing |
| 1 | R3 | (Malaysia) Sepang International Circuit | 9 April | (New Zealand) Taylor Cockerton | (China) Daniel Lu | (New Zealand) Taylor Cockerton | (Philippines) Cebu Pacific Air by PRT |
| 1 | R4 | (Malaysia) Sepang International Circuit | 9 April | (China) Daniel Lu | (China) Daniel Lu | (China) Daniel Lu | (Hong Kong) Absolute Racing |
| 2 | R1 | (Malaysia) Sepang International Circuit | 6 May | (China) James Yu | (Australia) Kurt Hill | (China) James Yu | (Hong Kong) Absolute Racing |
| 2 | R2 | (Malaysia) Sepang International Circuit | 6 May | (Australia) Kurt Hill | (China) Daniel Lu | (China) Daniel Lu | (Hong Kong) Absolute Racing |
| 2 | R3 | (Malaysia) Sepang International Circuit | 7 May | (China) James Yu | (China) James Yu | (China) James Yu | (Hong Kong) Absolute Racing |
| 2 | R4 | (Malaysia) Sepang International Circuit | 7 May | (China) James Yu | (China) James Yu | (China) James Yu | (Hong Kong) Absolute Racing |
| 3 | R1 | (China) Zhuhai International Circuit | 17 June | (New Zealand) Taylor Cockerton | (Singapore) Danial Frost | (China) Daniel Lu | (Hong Kong) Absolute Racing |
| 3 | R2 | (China) Zhuhai International Circuit | 18 June | (Singapore) Danial Frost | (Singapore) Danial Frost | (New Zealand) Taylor Cockerton | (Philippines) Cebu Pacific Air by PRT |
| 3 | R3 | (China) Zhuhai International Circuit | 18 June | (Singapore) Danial Frost | (Sweden) Arvin Esmaeili | (Sweden) Arvin Esmaeili | (Hong Kong) Absolute Racing |
| 4 | R1 | (China) Zhuhai International Circuit | 29 July | (China) James Yu | (Singapore) Danial Frost | (China) James Yu | (Hong Kong) Absolute Racing |
| 4 | R2 | (China) Zhuhai International Circuit | 29 July | (Singapore) Danial Frost | (China) Daniel Lu | (Singapore) Danial Frost | (Philippines) Eurasia Racing |
| 4 | R3 | (China) Zhuhai International Circuit | 30 July | (China) Daniel Lu | (China) Daniel Lu | (China) Daniel Lu | (Hong Kong) Absolute Racing |
| 5 | R1 | (China) Shanghai International Circuit | 23 September | (China) Daniel Lu | (New Zealand) Taylor Cockerton | (China) Daniel Lu | (Hong Kong) Absolute Racing |
| 5 | R2 | (China) Shanghai International Circuit | 23 September | (New Zealand) Taylor Cockerton | (New Zealand) Taylor Cockerton | (New Zealand) Taylor Cockerton | (Philippines) Cebu Pacific Air by PRT |
| 5 | R3 | (China) Shanghai International Circuit | 24 September | (China) James Yu | (New Zealand) Taylor Cockerton | (New Zealand) Taylor Cockerton | (Philippines) Cebu Pacific Air by PRT |
| 5 | R4 | (China) Shanghai International Circuit | 24 September | (New Zealand) Taylor Cockerton | (New Zealand) Taylor Cockerton | (New Zealand) Taylor Cockerton | (Philippines) Cebu Pacific Air by PRT |

== Championship standings ==
=== Scoring system ===
Points for are awarded as follows:

| Position | 1st | 2nd | 3rd | 4th | 5th | 6th | 7th | 8th | 9th | 10th | PP |
|---|---|---|---|---|---|---|---|---|---|---|---|
| 25-minute races | 20 | 15 | 12 | 10 | 8 | 6 | 4 | 3 | 2 | 1 | 1 |
| 15-minute races | 12 | 10 | 8 | 6 | 4 | 3 | 2 | 1 | 0 | | 1 |

=== Drivers' championship ===
| Pos. | Driver | SEP1 (Malaysia) | | | | SEP2 (Malaysia) | | | | ZIC1 (China) | | | ZIC2 (China) | | | SIC (China) | | | | Pts |
|---|---|---|---|---|---|---|---|---|---|---|---|---|---|---|---|---|---|---|---|---|
| 1 | (New Zealand) Taylor Cockerton | Ret | 3 | **1** | 3 | 2 | 2 | 5 | 2 | **2** | 1 | 4 | 2 | 5 | 2 | 4 | **1** | 1 | **1** | 221 |
| 2 | (China) Daniel Lu | 1 | 1 | 3 | **1** | 8 | 1 | 4 | 3 | 1 | Ret | 2 | 10 | 2 | **1** | **1** | 4 | 4 | 5 | 218 |
| 3 | (Singapore) Danial Frost | **2** | 4 | 2 | 2 | 3 | 5 | 2 | 5 | Ret | 6 | **DNS** | 6 | **1** | 5 | 3 | 3 | 3 | 3 | 166 |
| 4 | (China) James Yu | Ret | 5 | 4 | 4 | **1** | 3 | **1** | **1** | Ret | Ret | 7 | **1** | 4 | 6 | 10† | DNS | 8 | 8 | 139 |
| 5 | (Japan) Tomoki Takahashi | | | | | 10 | 6 | 3 | DNS | 3 | 2 | 6 | 3 | DNS | 7 | 2 | 2 | 2 | 2 | 115 |
| 6 | (Sweden) Arvin Esmaeili | 3 | 2 | Ret | 8 | 6 | 7 | 6 | 9 | 5 | 5 | 1 | 7 | 6 | Ret | Ret | 6 | Ret | 7 | 90 |
| 7 | (Australia) Kurt Hill | 7 | 8 | Ret | 6 | 4 | **4** | 10 | Ret | 6 | 3 | 3 | 8 | 7 | 4 | 9 | Ret | 6 | 9 | 82 |
| 8 | (Philippines) Ben Grimes | 5 | 6 | 7 | Ret | 7 | 13 | 9 | 12 | 7 | 7 | 5 | 4 | 3 | 3 | 5 | Ret | 10 | 11 | 75 |
| 9 | (Mexico) Manuel Cabrera | 6 | 10 | 6 | 10 | 5 | 8 | 8 | 6 | 9 | 4 | Ret | 5 | Ret | Ret | 6 | 8 | 5 | 6 | 66 |
| 10 | (China) Luo Kailuo | 8 | 12 | 5 | Ret | 9 | 9 | 11 | 8 | 4 | Ret | DNS | 9 | DNS | 9 | Ret | 5 | 7 | 4 | 44 |
| 11 | (Spain) Antolín González | 4 | 7 | 11 | 5 | Ret | 11 | 13 | 10 | 10 | 9 | 8 | | | | | | | | 27 |
| 12 | (Malaysia) Isyraf Danish | 9 | **9** | 9 | 7 | 12 | Ret | 7 | 4 | | | | | | | | | | | 23 |
| 13 | (China) Zhang Yaqi | 11 | 13 | 8 | 9 | 11 | 10 | 12 | 7 | 8 | 8 | DNS | Ret | 9 | 10 | Ret | DNS | 9 | 10 | 15 |
| 14 | (China) Billy Zheng | | | | | | | | | | | | | | | 7 | 7 | 11 | DSQ | 6 |
| 15 | (Malaysia) Nazim Azman | | | | | | | | | | | | Ret | 8 | 8 | | | | | 4 |
| 16 | (China) Hu Nan | 12 | 14 | 10 | 11 | Ret | 12 | Ret | 11 | Ret | 11 | 10 | 11 | 10 | 11 | 8 | 9 | 12 | 12 | 4 |
| 17 | (China) Liu Zexuan | | | | | | | | | 11 | 12 | 9 | | | | | | | | 2 |
| 18 | (Japan) Takashi Hata | 10 | 11 | DNS | DNS | | | | | | | | | | | | | | | 1 |
| 19 | (Philippines) Angie King | | | | | | | | | Ret | 10 | 11 | | | | | | | | 0 |
| Pos. | Driver | SEP1 (Malaysia) | | | | SEP2 (Malaysia) | | | | ZIC1 (China) | | | ZIC2 (China) | | | SIC (China) | | | | Pts |

| Colour | Result |
|---|---|
| Gold | Winner |
| Silver | Second place |
| Bronze | Third place |
| Green | Points classification |
| Blue | Non-points classification |
| Blue | Non-classified finish (NC) |
| Purple | Retired, not classified (Ret) |
| Red | Did not qualify (DNQ) |
| Red | Did not pre-qualify (DNPQ) |
| Black | Disqualified (DSQ) |
| White | Did not start (DNS) |
| White | Withdrew (WD) |
| White | Race cancelled (C) |
| Blank | Did not practice (DNP) |
| Blank | Did not arrive (DNA) |
| Blank | Excluded (EX) |

**Bold** – Pole
Italics – Fastest Lap
† – Retired, but classified
