= 2019 Ferrari Challenge Europe =

The 2019 Ferrari Challenge Europe was the 27th season of Ferrari Challenge Europe and its predecessor Ferrari Challenge Italy. The season consisted of 7 rounds, starting at the Bahrain International Circuit on February 16 and ending at the Mugello Circuit on October 26.

== Calendar ==
Rnd.	Circuit	Dates	Map
1	Bahrain International Circuit	February 16–17	2019 Ferrari Challenge Europe is located in Bahrain 2019 Ferrari Challenge Europe is located in Europe
2	(Spain) Circuit Ricardo Tormo	March 30–31	2019 Ferrari Challenge Europe is located in Bahrain 2019 Ferrari Challenge Europe is located in Europe
3	(Austria) Red Bull Ring	May 4–5	2019 Ferrari Challenge Europe is located in Bahrain 2019 Ferrari Challenge Europe is located in Europe
4	(France) Circuit de la Sarthe	June 15	2019 Ferrari Challenge Europe is located in Bahrain 2019 Ferrari Challenge Europe is located in Europe
5	(Germany) Nürburgring	July 6–7	2019 Ferrari Challenge Europe is located in Bahrain 2019 Ferrari Challenge Europe is located in Europe
6	(Italy) Autodromo Enzo e Dino Ferrari	September 28–29	2019 Ferrari Challenge Europe is located in Bahrain 2019 Ferrari Challenge Europe is located in Europe
7	(Italy) Mugello Circuit	October 26–27	2019 Ferrari Challenge Europe is located in Bahrain 2019 Ferrari Challenge Europe is located in Europe

== Entry list ==
All teams and drivers used the Ferrari 488 Challenge fitted with Pirelli tyres.

=== Trofeo Pirelli ===
Team	No.	Driver	Class	Rounds
(Italy) Rossocorsa	3	(Italy) Niccolò Schirò	Pro	All
(Italy) Rossocorsa	27	(Italy) Alessandro Vezzoni	Pro-Am	2
(Italy) Rossocorsa	46	(France) Chris Carel	Pro-Am	4
(Italy) Rossocorsa	85	(Italy) Emanuele-Maria Tabacchi	Pro-Am	All
(Italy) Rossocorsa	88	(United States) Eric Marston	Pro-Am	4
(Italy) Rossocorsa	94	(Belgium) John Wartique	Pro	4
(Italy) Rossocorsa	97	(Italy) Tommaso Rocca	Pro-Am	2, 4, 6–7
(Switzerland) Octane126	5	(Liechtenstein) Fabienne Wohlwend	Pro	2, 6–7
(Switzerland) Octane126	84	(Germany) Björn Grossmann	Pro	2–7
(France) Charles Pozzi	6	(France) Thomas Neubauer	Pro	1–2, 4–7
(Germany) Autohaus Ulrich Frankfurt	9	(Germany) Oliver Plassmann	Pro-Am	2–5, 7
(Germany) Gohm Motorsport	10	(Germany) Maximilian Mayer	Pro	2–3
(Germany) Gohm Motorsport	85	(Germany) Lennart Marioneck	Pro	5
(Germany) Gohm Motorsport	86	(Italy) Germano Salernitano	Pro-Am	7
(Switzerland) Kessel Racing	11	(Italy) Alessandro Bonacini	Pro	1–2
(Sweden) Scuderia Autoropa	13	(Sweden) Martin Nelson	Pro-Am	All
(Denmark) Formula Racing	17	(Italy) Louis Prette	Pro	All
(Denmark) Formula Racing	60	(Denmark) Johnny Laursen	Pro-Am	7
(Denmark) Formula Racing	82	(Taiwan) Kent Chen	Pro-Am	1
(Denmark) Formula Racing	89	(Denmark) Claus Zibrandsen	Pro-Am	4
(United Kingdom) HR Owen	26	(United Kingdom) Franck Ruimy	Pro-Am	1–2, 4–5, 7
(United Kingdom) HR Owen	80	(United Kingdom) Ali Kamyab	Pro-Am	1–2
(United Kingdom) HR Owen	93	(United Kingdom) Chris Froggatt	Pro	3–4, 7
(Czech Republic) Scudera Praha	37	(Czech Republic) Jan Danis	Pro-Am	2, 4, 6–7
(Czech Republic) Scudera Praha	56	(Slovakia) Matúš Vyboh	Pro-Am	3–7
(Denmark) Forza Racing	45	(Denmark) Christian Overgård	Pro-Am	All
(Denmark) Forza Racing	65	(Denmark) Frederik Espersen	Pro-Am	1–4, 6–7
(Hungary) Ferrari Budapest	47	(United Kingdom) Adam Carroll	Pro	3–7
(Italy) Ineco – MP Racing	50	(Italy) David Gostner	Pro-Am	1, 7
(Italy) Ineco – MP Racing	83	(Italy) Manuela Gostner	Pro-Am	1
(Germany) Ferrari Eberlein	51	(Germany) Walter-Ben Dörrenberg	Pro-Am	5
(United Kingdom) Graypaul Nottingham	61	(United Kingdom) John Dhillon	Pro-Am	1–6
(United Kingdom) Graypaul Nottingham	90	(United Kingdom) Jack Brown	Pro-Am	1–6
(Germany) MERTEL Italo Cars Nürnberg	87	(Slovakia) Marian Sufliarsky	Pro-Am	2
(Austria) Baron Motorsport	92	(United Kingdom) Sam Smeeth	Pro	All

=== Coppa Shell ===
Team	No.	Driver	Class	Rounds
(Denmark) Formula Racing	103	(Germany) "Boris Gideon"	Am	1–5
(Denmark) Formula Racing	107	(Japan) Ken Abe	Pro-Am	All
(Denmark) Formula Racing	122	(Denmark) Peter Christensen	Am	1
(Denmark) Formula Racing	132	(Denmark) Henrik Jansen	Am	2–4, 6–7
(Denmark) Formula Racing	157	(Lebanon) Tani Hanna	Pro-Am	All
(Denmark) Formula Racing	166	(Ecuador) Roberto Cava	Am	6
(Denmark) Formula Racing	168	(Malaysia) David Lim	Am	3, 6
(Denmark) Formula Racing	171	(Denmark) Per Falholt	Am	4
(Denmark) Formula Racing	193	(Japan) "Baby Kei"	Pro-Am	4
(Denmark) Formula Racing	198	(Hong Kong) Eric Cheung	Pro-Am	All
(Austria) Baron Motorsport	109	(Austria) Ernst Kirchmayr	Pro-Am	All
(Austria) Baron Motorsport	127	(Sweden) Thomas Lindroth	Pro-Am	All
(Austria) Baron Motorsport	159	(Germany) Matthias Moser	Am	1–5, 7
(Austria) Baron Motorsport	196	(Austria) Michael Simoncić	Am	4–7
(France) Modena Motors – SLR	110	(France) Charles Rupp	Pro-Am	6
(France) Modena Motors – SLR	134	(France) "Alex Fox"	Am	All
(Germany) Lüg Sportivo	111	(Germany) Holger Harmsen	Pro-Am	5, 7
(Czech Republic) Scuderia Praha	112	(Slovakia) Miroslav Vyboh	Am	4–7
(Czech Republic) Scuderia Praha	117	(Czech Republic) Dušan Palcr	Am	2–7
(Italy) Rossocorsa	118	(United States) James Weiland	Pro-Am	1, 3–5, 7
(Italy) Rossocorsa	121	(Germany) Andreas Segler	Pro-Am	6
(Italy) Rossocorsa	156	(Canada) John Farano	Pro-Am	6
(Italy) Rossocorsa	172	(Italy) Giuseppe Ramelli	Am	2–3, 5–7
(Italy) Rossocorsa	185	(United States) Dale Katechis	Pro-Am	4
(Italy) Rossocorsa	186	(Poland) Agata Smolka	Am	All
(Italy) Rossocorsa	187	(United States) Lisa Clark	Am	4
(Italy) Rossocorsa	188	(United States) Thomas Tippl	Pro-Am	4
(Italy) Rossocorsa	189	(United States) Mark Fuller	Am	4
(Italy) Rossocorsa	190	(United States) Brent Holden	Pro-Am	4
(Italy) Rossocorsa	197	(United States) Alan Hegyi	Am	4
(Denmark) Forza Racing	119	(Denmark) Per Nielsen	Am	1, 7
(Denmark) Forza Racing	126	(Denmark) Henrik Kamstrup	Am	6–7
(Belgium) Scuderia FMA	120	(Belgium) Guy Fawe	Pro-Am	4–7
(Germany) Gohm Motorsport	128	(Sweden) Christian Kinch	Pro-Am	All
(Germany) Gohm Motorsport	136	(Austria) Alexander Nußbaumer	Am	3–4, 6–7
(Switzerland) Kessel Racing	133	(Turkey) Murat Cuhadaroğlu	Pro-Am	1–4, 6–7
(Switzerland) Kessel Racing	177	(Netherlands) Fons Scheltema	Pro-Am	All
(United Kingdom) HR Owen	145	(Belgium) Laurent de Meeus	Am	All
(Germany) Moll Sportwagen Hannover	150	(Germany) Werner Genter	Pro-Am	5–6
(Italy) Ineco – MP Racing	161	(Italy) Thomas Gostner	Pro-Am	1–2, 6–7
(Italy) Ineco – MP Racing	173	(Italy) Corinna Gostner	Pro-Am	1–2, 6–7
(Sweden) Scuderia Autoropa	199	(Sweden) Ingvar Mattsson	Am	4–7

== Results and standings ==
=== Race results ===
Round	Race	Circuit	Pole position	Fastest lap	Trofeo Pirelli Winners	Coppa Shell Winners
1	1	Bahrain International Circuit	TP Pro: (United Kingdom) Sam Smeeth; TP Pro-Am: (Italy) Emanuele-Maria Tabacchi; CS Pro-Am: (United States) James Weiland; CS Am: (Poland) Agata Smolka	TP Pro: (Italy) Niccolò Schirò; TP Pro-Am: (Italy) Emanuele-Maria Tabacchi; CS Pro-Am: (Lebanon) Tani Hanna; CS Am: (Poland) Agata Smolka	Pro: (Italy) Niccolò Schirò; Rossocorsa; Pro-Am: (Italy) Emanuele-Maria Tabacchi; Rossocorsa	Pro-Am: (United States) James Weiland; Rossocorsa; Am: (Poland) Agata Smolka; Rossocorsa
1	2	Bahrain International Circuit	TP Pro: (France) Thomas Neubauer; TP Pro-Am: (Italy) Manuela Gostner; CS Pro-Am: (Austria) Ernst Kirchmayr; CS Am: (Denmark) Per Nielsen	TP Pro: (Italy) Louis Prette; TP Pro-Am: (United Kingdom) Jack Brown; CS Pro-Am: (Lebanon) Tani Hanna; CS Am: (Belgium) Laurent de Meeus	Pro: (Italy) Louis Prette; Formula Racing; Pro-Am: (Italy) Emanuele-Maria Tabacchi; Rossocorsa	Pro-Am: (Lebanon) Tani Hanna; Formula Racing; Am: (Denmark) Peter Christensen; Formula Racing
2	1	(Spain) Circuit Ricardo Tormo	TP Pro: (United Kingdom) Sam Smeeth; TP Pro-Am: (Czech Republic) Jan Danis; CS Pro-Am: (Hong Kong) Eric Cheung; CS Am: (Poland) Agata Smolka	TP Pro: (United Kingdom) Sam Smeeth; TP Pro-Am: (Italy) Alessandro Vezzoni; CS Pro-Am: (Austria) Ernst Kirchmayr; CS Am: (Denmark) Henrik Jansen	Pro: (United Kingdom) Sam Smeeth; Baron Motorsport; Pro-Am: (Czech Republic) Jan Danis; Scuderia Praha	Pro-Am: (Hong Kong) Eric Cheung; Formula Racing; Am: (Denmark) Henrik Jansen; Formula Racing
2	2	(Spain) Circuit Ricardo Tormo	TP Pro: (Germany) Björn Grossmann; TP Pro-Am: (United Kingdom) Jack Brown; CS Pro-Am: (Austria) Ernst Kirchmayr; CS Am: (Denmark) Henrik Jansen	TP Pro: (Germany) Björn Grossmann; TP Pro-Am: (Italy) Emanuele-Maria Tabacchi; CS Pro-Am: (Lebanon) Tani Hanna; CS Am: (Denmark) Henrik Jansen	Pro: (Germany) Björn Grossmann; Octane126; Pro-Am: (United Kingdom) Jack Brown; Graypaul Nottingham	Pro-Am: (Austria) Ernst Kirchmayr; Baron Motorsport; Am: (Denmark) Henrik Jansen; Formula Racing
3	1	(Austria) Red Bull Racing	TP Pro: (Italy) Niccolò Schirò; TP Pro-Am: (United Kingdom) Jack Brown; CS Pro-Am: (Hong Kong) Eric Cheung; CS Am: (Denmark) Henrik Jansen	TP Pro: (Italy) Louis Prette; TP Pro-Am: (United Kingdom) Jack Brown; CS Pro-Am: (Lebanon) Tani Hanna; CS Am: (Poland) Agata Smolka	Pro: (United Kingdom) Adam Carroll; Ferrari Budapest; Pro-Am: (United Kingdom) Jack Brown; Graypaul Nottingham	Pro-Am: (Lebanon) Tani Hanna; Formula Racing; Am: (Poland) Agata Smolka; Rossocorsa
3	2	(Austria) Red Bull Racing	TP Pro: Cancelled; TP Pro-Am: Cancelled; CS Pro-Am: (Hong Kong) Eric Cheung; CS Am: (Denmark) Henrik Jansen	TP Pro: Cancelled; TP Pro-Am: Cancelled; CS Pro-Am: (Austria) Ernst Kirchmayr; CS Am: (Denmark) Henrik Jansen	Pro: Cancelled Pro-Am: Cancelled	Pro-Am: (Austria) Ernst Kirchmayr; Baron Motorsport; Am: (Denmark) Henrik Jansen; Formula Racing
4	1	(France) Circuit de la Sarthe	TP Pro: (Italy) Louis Prette; TP Pro-Am: (Italy) Emanuele-Maria Tabacchi; CS Pro-Am: (United States) James Weiland; CS Am: (Denmark) Henrik Jansen	TP Pro: (United Kingdom) Adam Carroll; TP Pro-Am: (Italy) Emanuele-Maria Tabacchi; CS Pro-Am: (United States) James Weiland; CS Am: (Belgium) Laurent de Meeus	Pro: (United Kingdom) Adam Carroll; Ferrari Budapest; Pro-Am: (Italy) Emanuele-Maria Tabacchi; Rossocorsa	Pro-Am: (United States) James Weiland; Rossocorsa; Am: (Belgium) Laurent de Meeus; HR Owen
5	1	(Germany) Nürburgring	TP Pro: (Italy) Niccolò Schirò; TP Pro-Am: (Italy) Emanuele-Maria Tabacchi; CS Pro-Am: (United States) James Weiland; CS Am: (Sweden) Ingvar Mattsson	TP Pro: (Italy) Niccolò Schirò; TP Pro-Am: (Italy) Emanuele-Maria Tabacchi; CS Pro-Am: (United States) James Weiland; CS Am: (France) "Alex Fox"	Pro: (Italy) Niccolò Schirò; Rossocorsa; Pro-Am: (Slovakia) Matúš Vyboh; Scuderia Praha	Pro-Am: (United States) James Weiland; Rossocorsa; Am: (Sweden) Ingvar Mattsson; Scuderia Autoropa
5	2	(Germany) Nürburgring	TP Pro: (Italy) Louis Prette; TP Pro-Am: (United Kingdom) Jack Brown; CS Pro-Am: (Austria) Ernst Kirchmayr; CS Am: (France) "Alex Fox"	TP Pro: (Italy) Louis Prette; TP Pro-Am: (Italy) Emanuele-Maria Tabacchi; CS Pro-Am: (Netherlands) Fons Scheltema; CS Am: (France) "Alex Fox"	Pro: (Italy) Louis Prette; Formula Racing; Pro-Am: (Italy) Emanuele-Maria Tabacchi; Rossocorsa	Pro-Am: (Hong Kong) Eric Cheung; Formula Racing; Am: (Italy) Giuseppe Ramelli; Rossocorsa
6	1	(Italy) Autodromo Enzo e Dino Ferrari	TP Pro: (Italy) Niccolò Schirò; TP Pro-Am: (Czech Republic) Jan Danis; CS Pro-Am: (Italy) Thomas Gostner; CS Am: (Poland) Agata Smolka	TP Pro: (Italy) Louis Prette; TP Pro-Am: (Czech Republic) Jan Danis; CS Pro-Am: (Italy) Corinna Gostner; CS Am: (Denmark) Henrik Jansen	Pro: (Italy) Niccolò Schirò; Rossocorsa; Pro-Am: (Czech Republic) Jan Danis; Scuderia Praha	Pro-Am: (Italy) Thomas Gostner; Ineco – MP Racing; Am: (Denmark) Henrik Jansen; Formula Racing
6	2	(Italy) Autodromo Enzo e Dino Ferrari	TP Pro: (Italy) Louis Prette; TP Pro-Am: (United Kingdom) Jack Brown; CS Pro-Am: (Italy) Corinna Gostner; CS Am: (Belgium) Laurent de Meeus	TP Pro: (Italy) Niccolò Schirò; TP Pro-Am: (United Kingdom) Jack Brown; CS Pro-Am: (Netherlands) Fons Scheltema; CS Am: (Denmark) Henrik Jansen	Pro: (Italy) Louis Prette; Formula Racing; Pro-Am: (Italy) Emanuele-Maria Tabacchi; Rossocorsa	Pro-Am: (Hong Kong) Eric Cheung; Formula Racing; Am: (Poland) Agata Smolka; Rossocorsa
7	1	(Italy) Mugello Circuit	TP Pro: (United Kingdom) Adam Carroll; TP Pro-Am: (Italy) Emanuele-Maria Tabacchi; CS Pro-Am: (Lebanon) Tani Hanna; CS Am: (Denmark) Henrik Jansen	TP Pro: (United Kingdom) Adam Carroll; TP Pro-Am: (Italy) Emanuele-Maria Tabacchi; CS Pro-Am: (Japan) Ken Abe; CS Am: (Sweden) Ingvar Mattsson	Pro: (United Kingdom) Adam Carroll; Ferrari Budapest; Pro-Am: (Italy) Emanuele-Maria Tabacchi; Rossocorsa	Pro-Am: (United States) James Weiland; Rossocorsa; Am: (Denmark) Henrik Jansen; Rossocorsa
7	2	(Italy) Mugello Circuit	TP Pro: (Italy) Niccolò Schirò; TP Pro-Am: (Italy) Emanuele-Maria Tabacchi; CS Pro-Am: (Lebanon) Tani Hanna; CS Am: (Denmark) Henrik Jansen	TP Pro: (United Kingdom) Adam Carroll; TP Pro-Am: (Denmark) Johnny Laursen; CS Pro-Am: (United States) James Weiland; CS Am: (Sweden) Ingvar Mattsson	Pro: (Italy) Niccolò Schirò; Rossocorsa; Pro-Am: (Italy) Emanuele-Maria Tabacchi; Rossocorsa	Pro-Am: (United States) James Weiland; Rossocorsa; Am: (Denmark) Henrik Jansen; Rossocorsa

=== Championship standings ===
Points were awarded to the top ten classified finishers as follows:

Race Position	1st	2nd	3rd	4th	5th	6th	7th	8th	9th or lower	Pole	FLap	Entry
Points	20	15	12	10	8	6	4	2	1	1	1	1

Trofeo Pirelli

Pos.	Driver	(Bahrain) BHR		(Spain) VAL		(Austria) SPE		(France) LMS	(Germany) NÜR		(Italy) IMO		(Italy) MUG		Points
Pos.	Driver	R1	R2	R1	R2	R1	R2	R1	R1	R2	R1	R2	R1	R2	Points
Pro Class
1	(Italy) Louis Prette	3	1	6	3	3	C	2	5	1	6	1	4	4	173
2	(Italy) Niccolò Schirò	1	2	3	2	6	C	Ret	1	6	1	2	5	1	170
3	(United Kingdom) Sam Smeeth	2	4	1	6	5	C	3	3	7	3	5	3	5	139
4	(Germany) Björn Grossmann			4	1	2	C	Ret	6	2	2	3	2	2	131
5	(United Kingdom) Adam Carroll					1	C	1	7	3	4	4	1	3	127
6	(France) Thomas Neubauer	4	3	2	4			Ret	2	5	Ret	Ret	DNS	7	81
7	(Liechtenstein) Fabienne Wohlwend			8	7						5	6	6	6	36
8	(Italy) Alessandro Bonacini	5	5	5	8										29
9	(Germany) Lennart Marioneck								4	4					21
10	(United Kingdom) Chris Froggatt					4	C	Ret					7	8	20
11	(Germany) Maximilian Mayer			7	5	Ret	C								14
12	(Belgium) John Wartique							4							13
Pro-Am Class
1	(Italy) Emanuele-Maria Tabacchi	1	1	2	2	Ret	C	1	3	1	3	1	1	1	223
2	(United Kingdom) Jack Brown	2	2	3	1	1	C	3	6	2	9	2			151
3	(Czech Republic) Jan Danis			1	4			2			1	5	3	5	103
4	(Slovakia) Matúš Vyboh					4	C	6	1	5	7	3	2	4	94
5	(Sweden) Martin Nelson	7	3	4	9	Ret	C	Ret	2	3	2	4	6	Ret	93
6	(Denmark) Christian Overgård	3	5	5	Ret	Ret	C	9	4	4	4	7	11	6	79
7	(Denmark) Frederik Espersen	8	9	9	6	2	C	8			6	6	8	3	67
8	(Italy) Tommaso Rocca			7	7			5			5	8	4	10	46
9	(Germany) Oliver Plassmann			Ret	10	3	C	7	5	7			7	8	45
10	(United Kingdom) John Dhillon	4	6	10	Ret	5	C	11	7	6	8	Ret			44
11	(United Kingdom) Franck Ruimy	9	10	Ret	5			12	8	8			9	7	28
12	(Denmark) Johnny Laursen												5	2	25
13	(Slovakia) Marian Sufliarsky			6	3										19
14	(United Kingdom) Ali Kamyab	6	7	11	8										15
15	(Taiwan) Kent Chen	5	8												12
16	(Italy) Manuela Gostner	Ret	4												11
17	(Italy) Alessandro Vezzoni			8	11										5
=	(Germany) Walter-Ben Dörrenberg								9	9					5
19	(Denmark) Claus Zibrandsen							4							4
=	(Italy) Germano Salernitano												10	9	4
21	(France) Chris Carel							10							3
22	(United States) Eric Marston							13							1
=	(Italy) David Gostner	DNS	DNS										DNS	DNS	1

Coppa Shell

Pos.	Driver	(Bahrain) BHR		(Spain) VAL		(Austria) SPE		(France) LMS	(Germany) NÜR		(Italy) IMO		(Italy) MUG		Points
Pos.	Driver	R1	R2	R1	R2	R1	R2	R1	R1	R2	R1	R2	R1	R2	Points
Pro-Am Class
1	(Lebanon) Tani Hanna	2	1	6	2	1	6	4	2	6	2	Ret	2	10	159
2	(United States) James Weiland	1	Ret			Ret	5	1	1	Ret			1	1	130
3	(Hong Kong) Eric Cheung	4	6	1	Ret	5	3	10	6	1	7	1	10	4	129
4	(Japan) Ken Abe	7	4	4	4	4	4	9	4	3	8	4	4	5	118
5	(Netherlands) Fons Scheltema	9	5	10	3	2	7	2	3	7	4	8	6	6	110
6	(Austria) Ernst Kirchmayr	6	3	5	1	7	1	3	Ret	Ret	13	10	11	3	108
7	(Sweden) Christian Kinch	3	2	2	Ret	3	9	11	Ret	2	5	2	7	Ret	105
8	(Italy) Thomas Gostner	5	9	3	6						1	3	3	2	92
9	(Turkey) Murat Cuhadaroğlu	10	DNS	7	7	8	2	8			10	Ret	5	11	44
10	(Sweden) Thomas Lindroth	8	8	8	8	6	8	14	7	5	12	9	12	9	43
11	(Belgium) Guy Fawe							6	9	Ret	6	6	8	7	33
12	(Germany) Holger Harmsen								5	4			9	8	25
13	(Italy) Corinna Gostner	Ret	7	9	5						9	Ret	13	Ret	21
14	(Canada) John Farano										3	Ret			14
15	(United States) Thomas Tippl							5							11
16	(Germany) Andreas Segler										14	5			9
17	(Germany) Werner Genter								8	8	11	11			8
18	(United States) Brent Holden							7							7
19	(France) Charles Rupp										Ret	7			5
20	(United States) Dale Katechis							12							1
=	(Japan) "Baby Kei"							13							1
Am Class
1	(Denmark) Henrik Jansen			1	1	5	1	12			1	2	1	1	161
2	(Poland) Agata Smolka	1	Ret	2	4	1	10	13	2	6	2	1	4	Ret	144
=	(Belgium) Laurent de Meeus	2	3	4	2	7	2	1	10	Ret	9	3	5	5	144
4	(France) "Alex Fox"	3	Ret	5	5	9	5	4	3	8	5	4	12	8	96
5	(Italy) Giuseppe Ramelli			3	3	4	3		7	1	Ret	Ret	6	4	91
6	(Austria) Alexander Nußbaumer					2	6	3			3	5	3	3	84
7	(Sweden) Ingvar Mattsson							6	1	5	12	11	2	2	73
8	(Germany) Matthias Moser	6	2	Ret	6	10	7	5	6	3			10	7	53
9	(Germany) "Boris Gideon"	5	Ret	6	DNS	3	4	14	5	Ret					47
10	(Czech Republic) Dušan Palcr			DNS	DNS	6	8	8	4	7	11	DNS	8	10	37
11	(Austria) Michael Simoncić							11	8	2	10	9	9	6	33
12	(Slovakia) Miroslav Vyboh							9	9	4	6	8	Ret	11	28
13	(Denmark) Peter Christensen	Ret	1												21
=	(United States) Mark Fuller							2							21
15	(Denmark) Henrik Kamstrup										4	7	11	9	18
=	(Malaysia) David Lim					8	9				7	6			18
17	(Denmark) Per Nielsen	4	Ret										7	12	17
18	(Denmark) Per Falholt							7							7
19	(Ecuador) Roberto Cava										8	10			5
20	(United States) Alan Hegyi							10							3
21	(United States) Lisa Clark							Ret							1

== See also ==
- 2019 Finali Mondiali
