= 2017 Asian Formula Renault Series =

Racing Tournament

The 2017 Asian Formula Renault Series (aka AFR Series) is the 18th season of the AFR Series since its creation in 2000 by FRD. The season began on 18 March at the Zhuhai International Circuit and ended on 17 October at the Zhejiang International Circuit after six double-header events.

Starting from 2015, drivers and teams compete in two classes, Class A for drivers and teams competing with the 2013 FR2.0 car, and Class B for drivers and teams using the FR2.0 old spec cars.

As part of an enhanced agreement with Renault Sport, the season will feature a scholarship program for young Chinese drivers, called Road to Champion. The winner among these drivers over the last three rounds of the championship will secure a link to race the following year in Europe with the help of Renault Sport.

== Teams and drivers ==
Team	No.	Driver name	Class	Rounds
BlackArts Racing Team	1	(Macau) Charles Leong	A	1–5
BlackArts Racing Team	9	(Switzerland) Thomas Luedi	A	1–3, 5–6
BlackArts Racing Team	10	(China) Hua Miao	B	All
BlackArts Racing Team	18	(Monaco) Louis Prette	A	All
BlackArts Racing Team	20	(China) Neric Wei	A	1–4, 6
BlackArts Racing Team	28	(Singapore) Pavan Ravishankar	A	All
BlackArts Racing Team	44	(China) Luo Kailuo	A	6
BlackArts Racing Team	65	(India) Brad Dias	A	All
BlackArts Racing Team	77	(China) Ryan Liu	A	6
BlackArts Racing Team	84	(China) Jacky Liu	A	4–5
BlackArts Racing Team	91	(Hong Kong) David Pun	B	1
BlackArts Racing Team	91	(Hong Kong) David Pun	A	2–6
Asia Racing Team	3	(Singapore) Ni Weiliang	A	All
Asia Racing Team	22	(China) Lin Taian	B	1
Asia Racing Team	23	(China) Daniel Cao	A	3–6
Asia Racing Team	38	(Japan) Ayumu Iwasa	A	4
Asia Racing Team	55	(China) Daniel Lu	A	1–3, 5–6
Asia Racing Team	56	(Canada) Karl Yip	A	1
PS Racing	7	(China) Kimi Qin	A	2
PS Racing	15	(Japan) Iori Kimura	B	1
PS Racing	21	(Hong Kong) Dominic Tjia	B	1
PS Racing	33	(China) Victor Liang	A	1–2, 4–6
PS Racing	77	(China) Ryan Liu	B	5
KRC Racing	11	(China) Billy Zheng	A	1
KRC Racing	17	(China) Stephen Hong	A	All
S&D Motorsports	14	(Thailand) Umar bin Abdul Rahman	A	1–5
S&D Motorsports	14	(Colombia) Julio Acosta	A	6
S&D Motorsports	31	(China) Marcus Song	A	1, 3–6
S&D Motorsports	31	(China) Luo Kailuo	A	2
S&D Motorsports	36	(China) Grace Gui	B	All
S&D Motorsports	52	(Malaysia) Long Mohammad Nor Ariff	A	1–2
S&D Motorsports	52	(China) Luo Kailuo	A	3
S&D Motorsports	77	(China) Ryan Liu	B	4
S&D Motorsports	99	(Macau) Hugo Hung	A	5–6
RTC Team (FRD Road to Champion)	16	(China) Xu Zixuan	B	4–6
RTC Team (FRD Road to Champion)	66	(China) Li Wei	B	4–6
RTC Team (FRD Road to Champion)	86	(China) Allen Wang	B	4–5
Champ Motorsport	63	(Hong Kong) Xie Ruilin	B	1

Icon	Class
A	Class A
B	Class B

== Race calendar and results ==
Round		Circuit	Date	Pole position	Fastest lap	Winning driver	Winning team	Class B Winner
1	R1	(China) Zhuhai International Circuit, Zhuhai	18 March	(Macau) Charles Leong	(China) Daniel Lu	(Macau) Charles Leong	BlackArts Racing Team	(Hong Kong) Xie Ruilin
1	R2	(China) Zhuhai International Circuit, Zhuhai	19 March	(Macau) Charles Leong	(Macau) Charles Leong	(Macau) Charles Leong	BlackArts Racing Team	(Hong Kong) Xie Ruilin
2	R3	(Malaysia) Sepang International Circuit, Sepang	6 May	(China) Daniel Lu	(China) Daniel Lu	(China) Daniel Lu	Asia Racing Team	(China) Hua Miao
2	R4	(Malaysia) Sepang International Circuit, Sepang	7 May	(China) Daniel Lu	(China) Daniel Lu	(China) Victor Liang	PS Racing	(China) Grace Gui
3	R5	(China) Zhejiang International Circuit, Shaoxing	2 July	(China) Daniel Lu	(China) Daniel Cao	(China) Daniel Cao	Asia Racing Team	(China) Hua Miao
3	R6	(China) Zhejiang International Circuit, Shaoxing	2 July	(China) Daniel Lu	(China) Luo Kailuo	(China) Luo Kailuo	S&D Motorsports	(China) Hua Miao
4	R7	(China) Shanghai International Circuit, Shanghai	30 July	(Japan) Ayumu Iwasa	(Macau) Charles Leong	(Macau) Charles Leong	BlackArts Racing Team	(China) Ryan Liu
4	R8	(China) Shanghai International Circuit, Shanghai	30 July	(Japan) Ayumu Iwasa	(Japan) Ayumu Iwasa	(Macau) Charles Leong	BlackArts Racing Team	(China) Ryan Liu
5	R9	(China) Shanghai International Circuit, Shanghai	26 August	(Macau) Charles Leong	(Macau) Charles Leong	(China) Daniel Lu	Asia Racing Team	(China) Ryan Liu
5	R10	(China) Shanghai International Circuit, Shanghai	27 August	(Singapore) Pavan Ravishankar	(China) Daniel Cao	(China) Daniel Lu	Asia Racing Team	(China) Ryan Liu
6	R11	(China) Zhuhai International Circuit, Zhuhai	16 September	(Singapore) Pavan Ravishankar	(Singapore) Pavan Ravishankar	(Singapore) Pavan Ravishankar	BlackArts Racing Team	(China) Hua Miao
6	R12	(China) Zhuhai International Circuit, Zhuhai	17 September	(Monaco) Louis Prette	(China) Daniel Lu	(China) Daniel Lu	Asia Racing Team	(China) Hua Miao

== Championship standings ==
Points system

Points are awarded to the top 14 classified finishers. Drivers in classes A and B are classified separately.

Drivers' Championship
Position	**1st**	**2nd**	**3rd**	**4th**	**5th**	**6th**	**7th**	**8th**	**9th**	**10th**	**11th**	**12th**	**13th**	**14th**
Points	30	24	20	17	15	13	11	9	7	5	4	3	2	1

=== Drivers' Championships ===
Pos	Driver	ZIC1 (China)		SEP (Malaysia)		ZHE (China)		SIC1 (China)		SIC2 (China)		SIC2 (China)		Pts
Class A
1	(Macau) Charles Leong	**1**	**1**	2	4	3	3	1	1	**2**	3			245
2	(China) Daniel Lu	2	2	**1**	**7**	**2**	**12**			1	1	2	1	231
3	(Monaco) Louis Prette	3	3	Ret	2	4	7	7	5	4	6	3	**2**	192
4	(China) Daniel Cao					1	2	5	3	3	2	5	3	168
5	(Singapore) Pavan Ravishankar	4	Ret	4	6	7	5	3	4	Ret	**4**	**1**	8	166
6	(India) Brad Dias	8	Ret	7	3	6	8	8	9	6	8	7	6	124
7	(China) Stephen Hong	6	13	3	9	Ret	4	6	8	7	7	13	17	108
8	(China) Luo Kailuo			5	8	5	1					4	7	97
9	(China) Victor Liang	5	18	6	1			10	7	19	Ret	Ret	4	93
10	(China) Marcus Song	11	10			Ret	6	9	Ret	8	9	9	9	64
11	(China) Jacky Liu							4	6	5	5			60
12	(China) Neric Wei	7	6	12	EX	8	9	12	10			10	Ret	59
13	(Japan) Ayumu Iwasa							**2**	**2**					48
14	(Switzerland) Thomas Luedi	9	7	9	EX	9	Ret			11	10	16	10	48
15	(Singapore) Ni Weilang	15	Ret	13	Ret	10	Ret	11	16	9	Ret	11	11	32
16	(Hong Kong) David Pun		12	Ret	Ret	12	11	14	12	18	11	12	12	29
17	(China) Kimi Qin			8	5									24
18	(China) Billy Zheng	12	4											21
19	(Thailand) Umar Bin Abdul Rahman	20	11	14	EX	14	14	19	19	16	16			20
20	(Canada) Karl Yip	19	8											12
21	(Malaysia) Long Mohamad Nor Ariff	17	17	10	EX									10
22	(China) Ryan Liu											8	Ret	9
23	(Macau) Hugo Hung									14	17	15	14	7
Class B
1	(China) Hua Miao	13	Ret	11	EX	11	10	15	13	12	13	14	13	270
2	(China) Grace Gui	21	16	15	10	13	13	20	14	13	14	Ret	15	227
3	(China) Ryan Liu							13	11	10	12			120
4	(China) Li Wei							16	15	15	18	17	Ret	93
5	(China) Xu Zixuan							17	17	17	15			84
6	(Hong Kong) Xie Ruilin	10	5											60
7	(China) Allen Wang							18	18	20	Ret			41
8	(Hong Kong) Dominic Tjia	18	9											39
9	(China) Lin Taian	14	15											37
10	(Japan) Iori Kimura	22	14											31
11	(Hong Kong) David Pun	16												17
Pos	Driver	ZIC1 (China)		SEP (Malaysia)		ZHE (China)		SIC1 (China)		SIC2 (China)		SIC2 (China)		Pts

Colour	Result
Gold	Winner
Silver	Second place
Bronze	Third place
Green	Points classification
Blue	Non-points classification
Blue	Non-classified finish (NC)
Purple	Retired, not classified (Ret)
Red	Did not qualify (DNQ)
Red	Did not pre-qualify (DNPQ)
Black	Disqualified (DSQ)
White	Did not start (DNS)
White	Withdrew (WD)
White	Race cancelled (C)
Blank	Did not practice (DNP)
Blank	Did not arrive (DNA)
Blank	Excluded (EX)

**Bold** – Pole
Italics – Fastest Lap
