= 2026 Formula Regional European Championship =

Motor racing competition

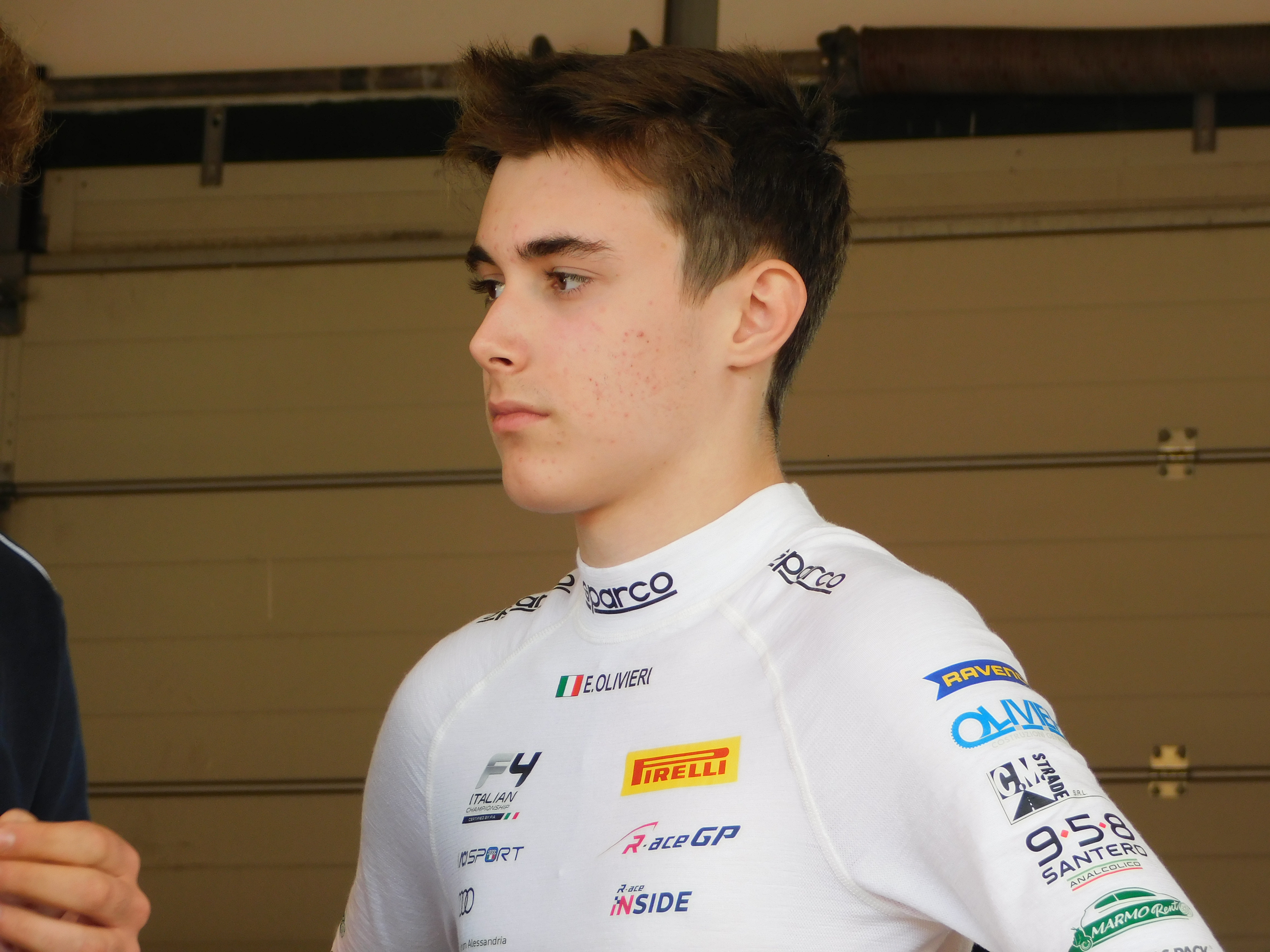
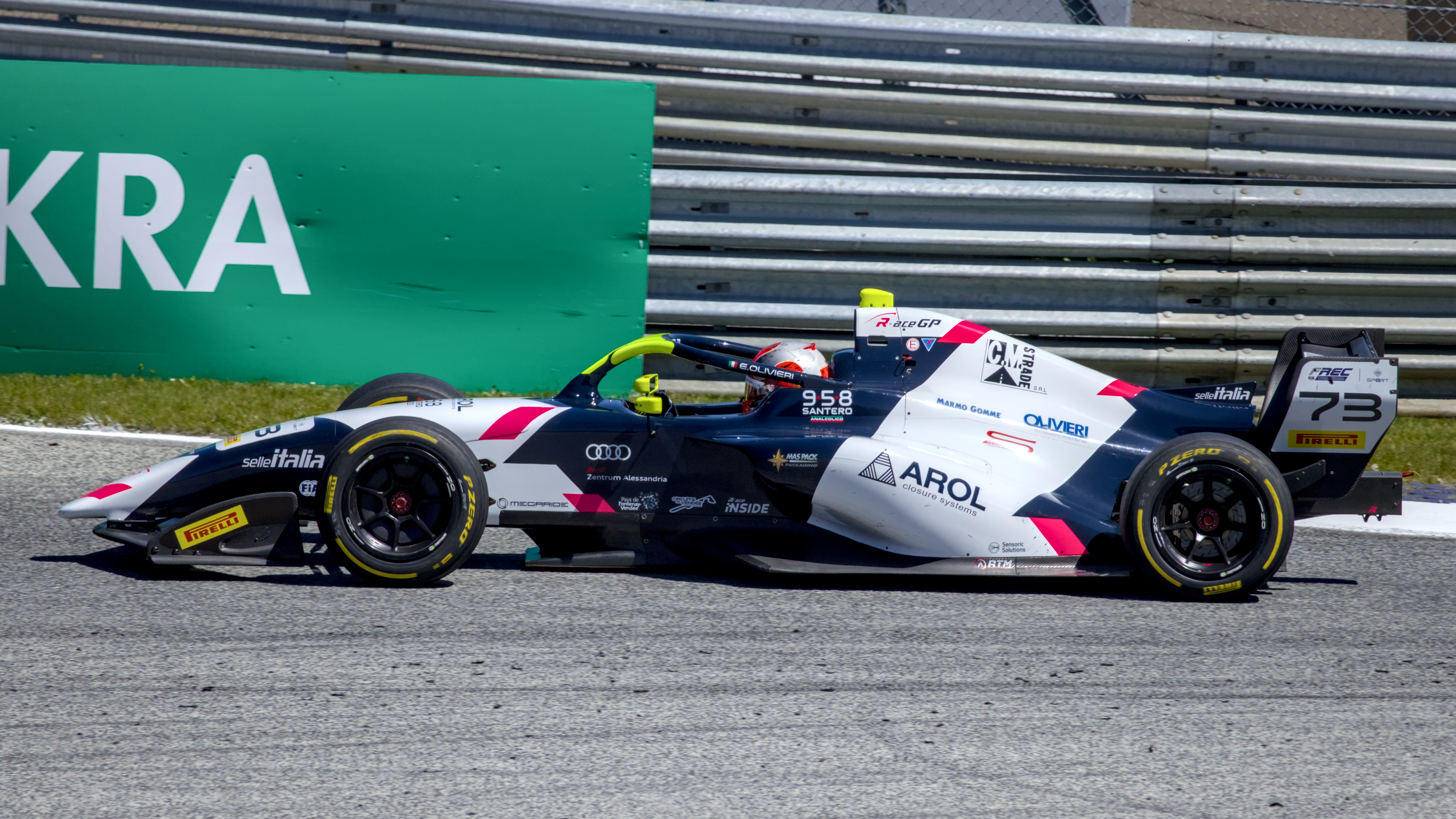
Emanuele Olivieri won the Drivers' Championship and in doing so also won the Rookie Championship, while his team R-ace GP won its second Teams' Championship in a row.

The 2026 FIA Formula Regional European Championship was a multi-event, Formula Regional open-wheel single seater motor racing championship held across Europe. The championship featured a mix of professional and amateur drivers, competing in Formula Regional cars that conform to the FIA Formula Regional regulations for the championship. This was the eighth season of the championship.

After five seasons of working together with Alpine for championship and engine branding purposes, the championship and the manufacturer split in 2026, coinciding with the series retiring the Tatuus FR-19 after seven seasons and switching to the new Tatuus T-326 chassis.

R-ace GP driver Emanuele Olivieri won the Drivers' Championship title with a 9-point gap over MP Motorsport driver Sebastian Wheldon. Olivieri also won the Rookies' Championship, and became the first rookie to win the overall championship since 2020. R-ace GP defended their Teams' Championship title with one race to spare.

== Teams and drivers ==
All teams competed using identical Tatuus T-326 cars powered by Toyota engines on Pirelli tyres. The ten pre-selected teams for the 2026 season were announced on 2 October 2025.

Team	No.	Driver	Status	Rounds
(New Zealand) Rodin Motorsport	2	(Australia) Alex Ninovic		All
(New Zealand) Rodin Motorsport	4	(United Kingdom) Reza Seewooruthun		All
(New Zealand) Rodin Motorsport	78	(Brazil) Gabriel Gomez	R	All
(Switzerland) G4 Racing	3	(Kuwait) Saqer Al-Maosherji		All
(Switzerland) G4 Racing	23	(United States) Rahim Alibhai	R	All
(Switzerland) G4 Racing	67	(Norway) Marcus Sæter	R	All
(Italy) RPM	5	(Brazil) Miguel Costa		All
(Italy) RPM	8	(Poland) Jan Przyrowski		All
(Italy) RPM	99	(Italy) Giovanni Maschio		1–7
(Italy) RPM	99	(United Kingdom) Lewis Wherrell	R	8
(Italy) CL Motorsport	6	(Switzerland) Enea Frey		1
(Italy) CL Motorsport	9	(Belgium) Thomas Strauven		2–3
(Italy) CL Motorsport	14	(Australia) Noah Lisle		5–6
(Italy) CL Motorsport	22	(Netherlands) René Lammers		7
(Italy) CL Motorsport	24	(France) Jules Roussel		All
(Italy) CL Motorsport	42	(South Korea) Kyuho Lee	R	4
(Italy) CL Motorsport	46	(India) Ary Bansal	R	8
(Italy) CL Motorsport	69	(Netherlands) Reno Francot		All
(Netherlands) Van Amersfoort Racing	7	(France) Andrea Dupé		All
(Netherlands) Van Amersfoort Racing	11	(Portugal) Francisco Macedo		1–6
(Netherlands) Van Amersfoort Racing	11	(Ukraine) Oleksandr Bondarev	R	7–8
(Netherlands) Van Amersfoort Racing	55	(India) Dion Gowda		All
(France) R-ace GP	12	(Japan) Yuki Sano		All
(France) R-ace GP	71	(United Arab Emirates) Rashid Al Dhaheri		All
(France) R-ace GP	73	(Italy) Emanuele Olivieri	R	All
(Netherlands) MP Motorsport	15	(Kazakhstan) Alexander Abkhazava		All
(Netherlands) MP Motorsport	28	(Italy) Zhenrui Chi (Note: Chi is a Chinese driver competing under an Italian licence.)		All
(Netherlands) MP Motorsport	98	(United States) Sebastian Wheldon		All
(France) ART Grand Prix	19	(Singapore) Kabir Anurag		All
(France) ART Grand Prix	27	(Monaco) Matteo Giaccardi		All
(France) ART Grand Prix	95	(France) Alexandre Munoz	R	All
(Italy) Trident Motorsport	33	(Italy) Maximilian Popov (Note: Popov is a Russian-Grenadian driver competing under an Italian license as Russian national emblems were banned by the FIA following the Russian invasion of Ukraine.)		All
(Italy) Trident Motorsport	47	(Serbia) Andrija Kostić		All
(Italy) Trident Motorsport	87	(India) Kai Daryanani		All
(Italy) Prema Racing	51	(United Kingdom) Kean Nakamura-Berta (Note: Nakamura-Berta is a Japanese-Slovak driver competing under a British licence.)		All
(Italy) Prema Racing	60	(Latvia) Tomass Štolcermanis	R	All
(Italy) Prema Racing	88	(Colombia) Salim Hanna		All

Icon	Status
R	Rookie

=== Team changes ===
After three years of competing in the series, Saintéloc Racing discontinued their FREC programme. AKCEL GP, who joined the series in 2025 and already ended its efforts after six of ten rounds, also did not return.

MP Motorsport returned to the series after a one-year absence, while New Zealand-based team Rodin Motorsport made their series debut.

=== Driver changes ===
Team's champion R-ace GP renewed their lineup after both Enzo Deligny and Jin Nakamura moved up to FIA F3 with Van Amersfoort Racing and Hitech respectively, and Akshay Bohra moved to Super Formula Lights with TOM'S. The team signed Rashid Al Dhaheri, who finished eighth with Prema Racing in 2025, hired TOM'S driver and Super Formula Lights runner-up Yuki Sano and promoted Emanuele Olivieri from their Italian F4 outfit after he came seventh in 2025.

Reigning Drivers' Champion Freddie Slater left Prema Racing as he graduated to FIA F3 with Trident, while Rashid Al Dhaheri moved to R-ace GP and Jack Beeton left the series to compete in Indy NXT with HMD Motorsports. Prema promoted reigning Italian F4, E4 and FRMET champion Kean Nakamura-Berta as well as Italian F4 rookie champion Salim Hanna from their Formula 4 operation. The team initially signed Sebastian Wheldon, but ahead of the start of the season, he joined MP Motorsport instead. The seat was taken by Tomass Štolcermanis, who finished fourth in 2025 F4 Middle East Championship and made a one-off appearance with RPM in 2025.

Van Amersfoort Racing saw two of their drivers move up to FIA F3, with Pedro Clerot joining Rodin Motorsport and Hiyu Yamakoshi remaining with VAR's F3 outfit. To replace them, the team signed Francisco Macedo, who moved over from Eurocup-3 after coming 14th in 2025 driving for Campos Racing's Griffin Core outfit, and Andrea Dupé, who graduated from Italian F4 and the E4 Championship.

ART Grand Prix saw both Taito Kato and Kanato Le get promoted to the team's FIA F3 setup, while Evan Giltaire moved to Super Formula Lights with B-Max Racing Team. The team signed three F4 graduates in Alpine junior driver Kabir Anurag who steps up after coming 16th in Italian F4 with US Racing, and French F4 drivers Alexandre Munoz and Matteo Giaccardi, who step up after finishing as 1st and 11th respectively.

Trident had an all-new line up after they promoted runner-up Matteo De Palo to their FIA F3 team, Nandhavud Bhirombhakdi joined DAMS in FIA F3 and Ruiqi Liu moved to Porsche Carrera Cup Asia with Phantom Global Racing. The team signed Italian F4 graduates Maksimilian Popov and Andrija Kostić, who took sixth place with Van Amersfoort Racing and 17th with US Racing respectively in 2025. Luka Sammalisto also was to join the team, but was replaced ahead of the season by Kai Daryanani, who finished 11th with JHR Developments in the 2025 GB3 Championship.

CL Motorsport saw all of their 2025 entrants bar Enea Frey depart the team, with Zhenrui Chi joining MP Motorsport and the other four competitors all leaving the series. Frey rejoined the team for a full season after a three-round campaign in 2025 saw him finish 25th. He was joined by reigning FIA F4 World Cup winner Jules Roussel, who stepped up from French F4, where he came third in 2025, and Reno Francot, who graduated to FREC after coming fifth in Spanish F4 and third in E4 in 2025 driving for KCL/MP and PHM Racing, respectively.

RPM saw Enzo Yeh and the other nine part-time entries of 2025 all depart the team. They signed two drivers departing Campos Racing in Spanish F4 in Jan Przyrowski, who was third and already made a one-round guest appearance in 2025, and Miguel Costa, who came 14th in 2025.

G4 Racing rehired Saqer Al-Maosherji, who had joined the team for the final three rounds of 2025 after AKCEL GP's mid-season departure, while the teams' five other 2025 competitors all left the series. G4 signed Italian F4 graduate Marcus Sæter, who finished 15th in 2025 with Van Amersfoort Racing, and Rahim Alibhai, who steps up to FREC after a part-time USF Juniors season with Zanella Racing.

New team Rodin Motorsport recruited two drivers from the GB3 championship in reigning champion Alex Ninovic, who moved over from the team's outfit in that championship, and Reza Seewooruthun, who joined Rodin after finishing fifth with Argenti with Prema. Italian F4 and Euro 4 runner-up Gabriel Gomez completed the teams' lineup.

Returning team MP Motorsport saw Alexander Abkhazava move from the teams' KCL-branded Eurocup-3 satellite outfit, with whom he came 12th in 2025, to FREC, and took on Zhenrui Chi for his full-season FREC debut after a four-race campaign for CL Motorsport in 2025. Sebastian Wheldon, third in Italian F4 with Prema Racing, was originally slated to remain with the Italian team before joining MP Motorsport to complete the team's lineup.

Departing team Saintéloc Racing saw Nikita Bedrin move to the GB3 Championship with VRD Racing, Tim Gerhards move to the Le Mans Cup in the LMP3 class with More Motorsport, and Yaroslav Veselaho join AF Corse in the Pro Cup of the International GT Open.

==== Mid-season ====
Enea Frey ended his affiliation with CL Motorsport and his FREC campaign after the opening round of the season. The team enlisted reigning Spanish F4 champion Thomas Strauven to replace Frey for the next two rounds, before the car was then piloted by Genesis Magma junior driver Kyuho Lee at Monza. For rounds five and six, CL Motorsport would then field Noah Lisle, who withdrew from his originally planned GB3 Championship season, in that car. At Imola, the car was piloted by series debutant and Eurocup-3 competitor René Lammers, before Italian F4 driver Ary Bansal took over for the season finale.

Francisco Macedo and Van Amersfoort Racing parted ways ahead of the penultimate round of the season, with the Portuguese driver replaced by FREC debutant Oleksandr Bondarev on his step up from Formula 4.

Giovanni Maschio did not enter the season finale as he prioritized his Le Mans Cup LMP3 campaign. To replace him, RPM enlisted British F4 driver Lewis Wherrell.

== Calendar ==
The FIA announced the series' provisional calendar on 2 December 2025. The series will reduce its calendar from ten to eight events, with Misano and Barcelona not returning to the calendar. To compensate for this, four rounds will divert from the series' two-race format and hold three races.

Round		Circuit	Date	Supporting	Map of circuit locations
1	R1	(Austria) Red Bull Ring, Spielberg	25 April	Deutsche Tourenwagen Masters; ADAC GT Masters; ADAC GT4 Germany; Porsche Carrera Cup Germany	2026 Formula Regional European Championship is located in Europe
1	R2	(Austria) Red Bull Ring, Spielberg	25 April	Deutsche Tourenwagen Masters; ADAC GT Masters; ADAC GT4 Germany; Porsche Carrera Cup Germany	2026 Formula Regional European Championship is located in Europe
1	R3	(Austria) Red Bull Ring, Spielberg	26 April	Deutsche Tourenwagen Masters; ADAC GT Masters; ADAC GT4 Germany; Porsche Carrera Cup Germany	2026 Formula Regional European Championship is located in Europe
2	R1	(Netherlands) Circuit Zandvoort, Zandvoort	23 May	Deutsche Tourenwagen Masters; ADAC GT Masters; ADAC GT4 Germany; Porsche Carrera Cup Germany	2026 Formula Regional European Championship is located in Europe
2	R2	(Netherlands) Circuit Zandvoort, Zandvoort	24 May	Deutsche Tourenwagen Masters; ADAC GT Masters; ADAC GT4 Germany; Porsche Carrera Cup Germany	2026 Formula Regional European Championship is located in Europe
3	R1	(Belgium) Circuit de Spa-Francorchamps, Stavelot	30 May	GB3 Championship; Supercar Challenge; Britcar Endurance Championship	2026 Formula Regional European Championship is located in Europe
3	R2	(Belgium) Circuit de Spa-Francorchamps, Stavelot	30 May	GB3 Championship; Supercar Challenge; Britcar Endurance Championship	2026 Formula Regional European Championship is located in Europe
3	R3	(Belgium) Circuit de Spa-Francorchamps, Stavelot	31 May	GB3 Championship; Supercar Challenge; Britcar Endurance Championship	2026 Formula Regional European Championship is located in Europe
4	R1	(Italy) Monza Circuit, Monza	20 June	Italian GT Championship Endurance Cup; Italian F4 Championship; TCR Italy Touring Car Championship; Porsche Carrera Cup Italia	2026 Formula Regional European Championship is located in Europe
4	R2	(Italy) Monza Circuit, Monza	20 June	Italian GT Championship Endurance Cup; Italian F4 Championship; TCR Italy Touring Car Championship; Porsche Carrera Cup Italia	2026 Formula Regional European Championship is located in Europe
4	R3	(Italy) Monza Circuit, Monza	21 June	Italian GT Championship Endurance Cup; Italian F4 Championship; TCR Italy Touring Car Championship; Porsche Carrera Cup Italia	2026 Formula Regional European Championship is located in Europe
5	R1	(Hungary) Hungaroring, Mogyoród	4 July	International GT Open; TCR Europe Touring Car Series	2026 Formula Regional European Championship is located in Europe
5	R2	(Hungary) Hungaroring, Mogyoród	5 July	International GT Open; TCR Europe Touring Car Series	2026 Formula Regional European Championship is located in Europe
6	R1	(France) Circuit Paul Ricard, Le Castellet	18 July	International GT Open; GT Cup Open Europe	2026 Formula Regional European Championship is located in Europe
6	R2	(France) Circuit Paul Ricard, Le Castellet	19 July	International GT Open; GT Cup Open Europe	2026 Formula Regional European Championship is located in Europe
7	R1	(Italy) Imola Circuit, Imola	5 September	Italian GT Championship Endurance Cup; Italian F4 Championship; GT4 Italian Series	2026 Formula Regional European Championship is located in Europe
7	R2	(Italy) Imola Circuit, Imola	5 September	Italian GT Championship Endurance Cup; Italian F4 Championship; GT4 Italian Series	2026 Formula Regional European Championship is located in Europe
7	R3	(Italy) Imola Circuit, Imola	6 September	Italian GT Championship Endurance Cup; Italian F4 Championship; GT4 Italian Series	2026 Formula Regional European Championship is located in Europe
8	R1	(Germany) Hockenheimring, Hockenheim	12 September	International GT Open; Euroformula Open Championship; Porsche Carrera Cup Benelux; Supercar Challenge	2026 Formula Regional European Championship is located in Europe
8	R2	(Germany) Hockenheimring, Hockenheim	13 September	International GT Open; Euroformula Open Championship; Porsche Carrera Cup Benelux; Supercar Challenge	2026 Formula Regional European Championship is located in Europe

== Season report ==
=== First half ===
The 2026 FIA Formula Regional European Championship began at the Red Bull Ring with pole position for Prema's Kean Nakamura-Berta in the opening qualifying session. The opening race saw Nakamura-Berta and R-ace GP's Rashid Al Dhaheri taking turns leading the race while Rodin's Alex Ninovic and MP's Sebastian Wheldon were also part of the lead battle. Nakamura-Berta was victorious in the end, with Al Dhaheri second and Wheldon inheriting third after a penalty for Ninovic. A reverse-grid race followed, where VAR driver Dion Gowda led from start to finish, but was classified fourth after a jump start penalty. That saw Al Dhaheri take his maiden victory after rising from eleventh on the grid to second on the road as Rodin's Reza Seewooruthun and CL's Reno Francot completed the podium. Nakamura-Berta claimed pole position again for race three, but lost his lead to Francot ahead of the first of four safety car interruptions. Francot remained faultless throughout all the restarts to clinch his and his team's first victory ahead of Ninovic and Wheldon. Polesitter Nakamura-Berta was involved in multiple incidents, ending in damage to his rear wing and a non-finish as Francot assumed the lead in the standings.

Round two at Circuit Zandvoort saw Wheldon take pole position for the first race, with Prema's Salim Hanna starting alongside him. At the start of race 1, Prema's Tomass Štolcermanis surged from the second row to take the lead around the outside of Wheldon at Tarzan. After an early safety car, Wheldon reclaimed the lead by drafting past him on the restart. As Štolcermanis faded, Hanna moved into second and spent the remainder of the race chasing Wheldon. Despite narrowing the gap to 0.249 seconds, Wheldon resisted late pressure to claim his first career victory in the series as R-ace GP's Emanuele Olivieri finished third. Nakamura-Berta was fastest in qualifying for race 2, which began with a major incident as the Trident of Andrija Kostić was pitched into a barrel roll, causing a red flag. After the restart, Wheldon overtook Nakamura-Berta for the lead at the banked final turn. He successfully defended his position to complete the weekend sweep and take the championship lead by twelve points over Francot, who finished third.

Spa-Francorchamps hosted round three, and it began with a surprise pole position for ART Grand Prix driver Alexandre Munoz ahead of Al Dhaheri. Heavy rain across Saturday morning meant the opening race was suspended after two reconnaissance laps before it was held in place of the reversed-grid race. The race started behind the safety car, allowing Munoz to keep his advantage at the front. Three more caution periods punctured the race, and the last one set up a one-lap dash to the finish. A slow restart saw Al Dhaheri get by before Munoz repassed him into Les Combes and kept ahead through the final lap to take his maiden win as Nakamura-Berta took third. Qualifying for race two saw Trident's Maximilian Popov claim pole position, with Al Dhaheri starting on the front row again. Munoz tried taking the lead from him on the opening lap before running off track and falling down the order. The fight for second place between Al Dhaheri, MP's Alexander Abkhazava and RPM's Jan Przyrowski then allowed Popov to control his lead before the race ended under safety car and he claimed his maiden victory. Abkhazava finished second as Al Dhaheri in third took a one-point lead over Wheldon.

Round four at Monza Circuit marked the halfway point of the season. Nakamura-Berta took pole position for the first race, which began with a six-car pileup in the first chicane. Upon resumption, Olivieri began pressuring leader Nakamura-Berta, briefly taking the lead with five minutes to go before Nakamura-Berta was able to respond and retake the position. He then moved clear and took his second victory of the season. The reverse-grid race two began with another first-corner incident as VAR's polesitter Andrea Dupé hit Abkhazava. Both continued as Popov and Ninovic assumed the lead, before that pair also collided. That saw Dupé get back in front ahead of a multi-car battle for second. He then dropped behind Hanna, Wheldon and Al Dhaheri, before the Emirati took the lead and won the race. Post-race penalties saw Wheldon drop outside the points, reinstating Dupé's maiden podium. Olivieri took his maiden pole position in Sunday's qualifying and led from Nakamura-Berta until the latter made contact with Olivieri's rear tyre and was sent into the gravel. Olivieri held his lead through two safety car phases and took victory ahead of Wheldon, who claimed a seven-point championship lead, and R-ace GP's Yuki Sano.

=== Second half ===
The second half of the season began with two races at the Hungaroring, and pole position for the first one went to Sano. Seewooruthun started alongside him and tried taking the lead, but Sano defended, which saw Al Dhaheri move into second. The top two then gapped the rest of the field. Al Dhaheri closely shadowed the leader, but Sano remained in control to claim his maiden victory. Points leader Wheldon had a difficult race marred by a mid-race spin and finished 26th, ceding the championship lead to Al Dhaheri. The Emirati then took pole position for the second race, with Abkhazava starting second. Oliveri and Nakamura-Berta slotted in behind them at the start of the race as Wheldon had to endure more difficulties and eventually retired with a technical problem. Al Dhaheri managed the race throughout a mid-race safety car, before another incident saw the race finish under caution. Al Dhaheri won to extend his championship lead to 21 points, while a post-race penalty for Abkhazava lifted Oliveri and Nakamura-Berta onto the podium.

Round six at the Circuit Paul Ricard began with Nakamura-Berta claiming his fifth pole position. Wheldon started second, but took the lead right away as Abkhazava slotted into third. Nakamura-Berta reclaimed first one lap later, pushing Wheldon wide and allowing Abkhazava into second. Nakamura-Berta defended his lead as Olivieri closed up to the leading group. The Italian took third off Wheldon on lap eight and worked on Abkhazava, who defended second place heavily until he finally lost out with three laps to go. Olivieri continued his pace by setting pole position for race two, but a grid penalty saw Wheldon start from first place. Abkhazava collided with Francot while fighting over second place, before Olivieri passed the latter and took third. One lap later, Oliveri also passed Abkhazava, but by that point, Wheldon had a sizable gap and took his third victory of the season. A penalty for Abkhazava handed third to Nakamura-Berta, who reclaimed the championship lead by 13 points over Wheldon and Al Dhaheri, who were tied on points.

Olivieri claimed his second series pole position in qualifying for the penultimate round at Imola. Wheldon in second place had a bad start to the first race, allowing Olivieri to build an early gap. The race was punctured by four safety car periods, but Olivieri managed the four ensuing restarts, leading Wheldon and Munoz to win, clinch the rookie title and take over the overall championship lead. Hanna had reverse-grid pole position and led Roussel, before the Frenchman was overtaken by VAR's debutant Oleksandr Bondarev on lap three. A safety car and a subpar restart for Roussel then saw him also lose out to Francot. Two more safety car interruptions followed, meaning the top three remained close together, but no positional changes followed. The second qualifying session saw Bondarev take a surprise pole position ahead of Olivieri, before race three was filled with incidents once again. Bondarev controlled three safety car periods and restarts and claimed a maiden victory in just his third Formula Regional race. Olivieri took second ahead of Francot to extend his championship lead to 20 points over Wheldon, while Nakamura-Berta and Al Dhaheri, who did not feature in the top five all weekend, dropped to third and fourth.

The season finale at the Hockenheimring began with Wheldon taking pole position for the first race. Oliveri started second, before the pair collided heading into the first corner, with Oliveri retiring and Wheldon dropping down the order. Przyrowski took the lead ahead of Nakamura-Berta and Munoz as the safety car was deployed. Upon resumption, the leader was able to control the remainder of the race, with Nakamura-Berta content to take second place ahead of Al Dhaheri and regain second in the standings, seven points behind Oliveri. Wheldon bounced back with another pole position in the second qualifying session, and this time, he was able to hold his lead without problems as Nakamura-Berta slotted into second. Przyrowski in third then attacked him for second and the pair collided and dropped outside the top five. Olivieri and Abkhazava benefitted and moved into the podium places, where they remained until the finish. That saw Oliveri clinch the championship title, while Wheldon's victory saw him finish as the runner-up.

== Race results ==
Round		Circuit	Pole position	Fastest lap	Winning driver	Winning team	Rookie winner
1	R1	(Austria) Red Bull Ring	(United Kingdom) Kean Nakamura-Berta	(Australia) Alex Ninovic (Note: Alex Ninovic set the fastest lap but did not finish in the top 10, so the point was not awarded.)	(United Kingdom) Kean Nakamura-Berta	(Italy) Prema Racing	(France) Alexandre Munoz
1	R2	(Austria) Red Bull Ring		(India) Dion Gowda	(United Arab Emirates) Rashid Al Dhaheri (Note: Dion Gowda crossed the line first, but was given a five-second penalty for a jump start. Rashid Al Dhaheri, initially classified second, thus inherited the win.)	(France) R-ace GP	(Italy) Emanuele Olivieri
1	R3	(Austria) Red Bull Ring	(United Kingdom) Kean Nakamura-Berta	(Australia) Alex Ninovic	(Netherlands) Reno Francot	(Italy) CL Motorsport	(Brazil) Gabriel Gomez
2	R1	(Netherlands) Circuit Zandvoort	(United States) Sebastian Wheldon	(Italy) Emanuele Olivieri	(United States) Sebastian Wheldon	(Netherlands) MP Motorsport	(Italy) Emanuele Olivieri
2	R2	(Netherlands) Circuit Zandvoort	(United Kingdom) Kean Nakamura-Berta	(United Kingdom) Kean Nakamura-Berta	(United States) Sebastian Wheldon	(Netherlands) MP Motorsport	(Italy) Emanuele Olivieri
3	R1	(Belgium) Circuit de Spa-Francorchamps	(France) Alexandre Munoz	(United Kingdom) Kean Nakamura-Berta	(France) Alexandre Munoz	(France) ART Grand Prix	(France) Alexandre Munoz
3	R2	(Belgium) Circuit de Spa-Francorchamps		Race cancelled due to adverse weather conditions			
3	R3	(Belgium) Circuit de Spa-Francorchamps	(Italy) Maximilian Popov	(United Arab Emirates) Rashid Al Dhaheri	(Italy) Maximilian Popov	(Italy) Trident Motorsport	(Norway) Marcus Sæter
4	R1	(Italy) Monza Circuit	(United Kingdom) Kean Nakamura-Berta	(Poland) Jan Przyrowski	(United Kingdom) Kean Nakamura-Berta	(Italy) Prema Racing	(Italy) Emanuele Olivieri
4	R2	(Italy) Monza Circuit		(Japan) Yuki Sano (Note: Yuki Sano set the fastest lap but did not finish in the top 10, so the point was not awarded.)	(United Arab Emirates) Rashid Al Dhaheri	(France) R-ace GP	(Norway) Marcus Sæter
4	R3	(Italy) Monza Circuit	(Italy) Emanuele Olivieri	(France) Jules Roussel	(Italy) Emanuele Olivieri	(France) R-ace GP	(Italy) Emanuele Olivieri
5	R1	(Hungary) Hungaroring	(Japan) Yuki Sano	(Italy) Emanuele Olivieri	(Japan) Yuki Sano	(France) R-ace GP	(Italy) Emanuele Olivieri
5	R2	(Hungary) Hungaroring	(United Arab Emirates) Rashid Al Dhaheri	(Kazakhstan) Alexander Abkhazava (Note: Alexander Abkhazava set the fastest lap but did not finish in the top 10, so the point was not awarded.)	(United Arab Emirates) Rashid Al Dhaheri	(France) R-ace GP	(Italy) Emanuele Olivieri
6	R1	(France) Circuit Paul Ricard	(United Kingdom) Kean Nakamura-Berta	(Portugal) Francisco Macedo (Note: Francisco Macedo set the fastest lap but did not finish in the top 10, so the point was not awarded.)	(United Kingdom) Kean Nakamura-Berta	(Italy) Prema Racing	(Italy) Emanuele Olivieri
6	R2	(France) Circuit Paul Ricard	(United States) Sebastian Wheldon (Note: Emanuele Olivieri set the fastest time in qualifying but received a three-place grid penalty due to his mechanics working on the car before it was correctly parked in the pit lane. Sebastian Wheldon, who set the second fastest time, was promoted to pole position.)	(United States) Sebastian Wheldon	(United States) Sebastian Wheldon	(Netherlands) MP Motorsport	(Italy) Emanuele Olivieri
7	R1	(Italy) Imola Circuit	(Italy) Emanuele Olivieri	(Italy) Emanuele Olivieri	(Italy) Emanuele Olivieri	(France) R-ace GP	(Italy) Emanuele Olivieri
7	R2	(Italy) Imola Circuit		(Colombia) Salim Hanna	(Colombia) Salim Hanna	(Italy) Prema Racing	(Ukraine) Oleksandr Bondarev
7	R3	(Italy) Imola Circuit	(Ukraine) Oleksandr Bondarev	(Italy) Zhenrui Chi (Note: Zhenrui Chi set the fastest lap but did not finish in the top 10, so the point was not awarded.)	(Ukraine) Oleksandr Bondarev	(Netherlands) Van Amersfoort Racing	(Ukraine) Oleksandr Bondarev
8	R1	(Germany) Hockenheimring	(United States) Sebastian Wheldon	(Poland) Jan Przyrowski	(Poland) Jan Przyrowski	(Italy) RPM	(Ukraine) Oleksandr Bondarev
8	R2	(Germany) Hockenheimring	(United States) Sebastian Wheldon	(United Arab Emirates) Rashid Al Dhaheri (Note: Rashid Al Dhaheri set the fastest lap but did not finish in the top 10, so the point was not awarded.)	(United States) Sebastian Wheldon	(Netherlands) MP Motorsport	(Italy) Emanuele Olivieri

== Championship standings ==
=== Scoring system ===
The points system was overhauled in 2026, introducing points for the drivers taking pole position in qualifying and setting the fastest lap in the top ten. In the newly introduced three-race rounds, the second race of the weekend saw the top twelve of the first qualifying session reversed on the grid.

Sprint race points

The sprint races awarded reduced points as shown below:

Position	**1st**	**2nd**	**3rd**	**4th**	**5th**	**6th**	**7th**	**8th**	**9th**	**10th**	**FL**
Points	10	9	8	7	6	5	4	3	2	1	1

Main race points

Points for the two main races remained the same, with the aforementioned addition of bonus points for pole position and fastest lap:

Position	**1st**	**2nd**	**3rd**	**4th**	**5th**	**6th**	**7th**	**8th**	**9th**	**10th**	**Pole**	**FL**
Points	25	18	15	12	10	8	6	4	2	1	2	1

=== Drivers' Championship ===
Pos	Driver	RBR (Austria)			ZAN (Netherlands)		SPA (Belgium)			MNZ (Italy)			HUN (Hungary)		LEC (France)		IMO (Italy)			HOC (Germany)		Pts
Pos	Driver	R1	R2	R3	R1	R2	R1	R2	R3	R1	R2	R3	R1	R2	R1	R2	R1	R2	R3	R1	R2	Pts
1	(Italy) Emanuele Olivieri	22	7	Ret	3	6	6	C	8	2	Ret	**1**	4	2	2	2	**1**	9	2	Ret	2	218
2	(United States) Sebastian Wheldon	3	19	3	**1**	1	5	C	10	5	20	2	26	Ret	5	**1**	2	8	12	**19**	**1**	209
3	(United Kingdom) Kean Nakamura-Berta	**1**	6	**25**†	DSQ	**2**	3	C	5	**1**	5	Ret	10	3	**1**	3	15	10	9	2	6	201
4	(United Arab Emirates) Rashid Al Dhaheri	2	1	5	5	4	2	C	3	11	1	9	2	**1**	26	6	Ret	6	10	3	11	180
5	(Netherlands) Reno Francot	5	3	1	4	3	13	C	20	8	21	21	Ret	5	7	Ret	5	3	3	18	21	123
6	(Kazakhstan) Alexander Abkhazava	7	Ret	13	7	9	27	C	2	4	Ret	Ret	12	13	3	5	4	7	Ret	13	3	100
7	(Colombia) Salim Hanna	11	10	4	2	14	11	C	21	3	2	8	13	Ret	17	12	8	1	Ret	7	5	92
8	(Italy) Zhenrui Chi	4	5	22	8	5	Ret	C	11	6	4	12	15	26	6	7	14	26	23	4	15	73
9	(Japan) Yuki Sano	10	12	Ret	17	16	4	C	16	Ret	22	3	**1**	18	11	17	17	Ret	Ret	14	4	67
10	(Australia) Alex Ninovic	12	17	2	6	15	7	C	6	Ret	24	19	8	4	9	8	Ret	25	13	10	DSQ	64
11	(Italy) Maximilian Popov	6	11	11	10	Ret	18	C	**1**	Ret	13	7	22	20	13	19	11	Ret	6	5	Ret	60
12	(Poland) Jan Przyrowski	17	25	Ret	21	13	20	C	4	7	11	5	14	11	10	9	23†	17	15	1	13	58
13	(France) Alexandre Munoz	26	18	8	20	8	**1**	C	9	12	Ret	11	11	17	15	16	3	21	8	12	16	56
14	(Brazil) Gabriel Gomez	Ret	15	7	11	21	9	C	17	9	10	4	24	10	4	4	13	15	Ret	22	18	48
15	(Ukraine) Oleksandr Bondarev																10	2	**1**	8	7	47
16	(United Kingdom) Reza Seewooruthun	28	2	19	12	12	8	C	12	Ret	18	17	3	9	16	14	12	13	14	9	14	32
17	(Latvia) Tomass Štolcermanis	23	14	20	DSQ	7	16	C	27	17	7	18	5	Ret	14	11	Ret	11	4	Ret	Ret	32
18	(Norway) Marcus Sæter	15	Ret	14	22	22	12	C	7	13	6	Ret	7	7	8	15	24†	23	11	17	9	29
19	(France) Jules Roussel	25	22	16	13	17	24	C	13	14	Ret	6	18	22	27	24	9	4	5	16	22	28
20	(India) Dion Gowda	13	4	6	9	10	Ret	C	28†	15	17	13	21	27	19	18	16	16	7	Ret	24	25
21	(Singapore) Kabir Anurag	16	16	18	26	18	21	C	25	20	8	25†	9	12	12	10	6	5	20	20	10	21
22	(Kuwait) Saqer Al-Maosherji	Ret	Ret	Ret	16	26	25	C	Ret	22	9	10	6	8	DNS	13	18	Ret	22	Ret	Ret	15
23	(Brazil) Miguel Costa	9	Ret	9	Ret	24	17	C	Ret	DSQ	19	Ret	23	14	18	27	Ret	19	16	6	12	12
24	(Portugal) Francisco Macedo	18	9	21	15	23	Ret	C	23	Ret	23	23	17	6	28	21						10
25	(India) Kai Daryanani	8	8	10	19	Ret	10	C	18	10	Ret	Ret	29	25	24	Ret	21	20	18	23	20	10
26	(France) Andrea Dupé	27	20	17	18	11	22	C	15	18	3	16	28	15	22	22	25†	24	19	25	19	8
27	(Monaco) Matteo Giaccardi	21	24	15	14	19	14	C	14	Ret	14	20	25	23	Ret	20	7	14	17	21	17	6
28	(United Kingdom) Lewis Wherrell																			Ret	8	4
29	(India) Ary Bansal																			11	23	0
30	(Serbia) Andrija Kostić	19	13	12	25	Ret	19	C	22	19	Ret	22	27	24	23	Ret	22†	Ret	21	24†	Ret	0
31	(South Korea) Kyuho Lee									16	12	24										0
32	(Netherlands) René Lammers																Ret	12	Ret			0
33	(United States) Rahim Alibhai	24	23	Ret	24	25	26	C	26	23†	16	14	19	19	20	25	19	22	Ret	15	25	0
34	(Switzerland) Enea Frey	14	Ret	23																		0
35	(Italy) Giovanni Maschio	20	21	24†	Ret	Ret	15	C	19	21	15	15	20	21	21	23	20	18	Ret			0
36	(Australia) Noah Lisle												16	16	25	26						0
37	(Belgium) Thomas Strauven				23	20	23	C	24													0
Pos	Driver	R1	R2	R3	R1	R2	R1	R2	R3	R1	R2	R3	R1	R2	R1	R2	R1	R2	R3	R1	R2	Pts
Pos	Driver	RBR (Austria)			ZAN (Netherlands)		SPA (Belgium)			MNZ (Italy)			HUN (Hungary)		LEC (France)		IMO (Italy)			HOC (Germany)		Pts

Colour	Result
Gold	Winner
Silver	Second place
Bronze	Third place
Green	Points classification
Blue	Non-points classification
Blue	Non-classified finish (NC)
Purple	Retired, not classified (Ret)
Red	Did not qualify (DNQ)
Red	Did not pre-qualify (DNPQ)
Black	Disqualified (DSQ)
White	Did not start (DNS)
White	Withdrew (WD)
White	Race cancelled (C)
Blank	Did not practice (DNP)
Blank	Did not arrive (DNA)
Blank	Excluded (EX)

**Bold** – Pole

Italics – Fastest Lap

† – Did not finish, but classified (completed more than 90% of the race distance)

Rookie

=== Teams' Championship ===
Pos	Team	RBR (Austria)			ZAN (Netherlands)		SPA (Belgium)			MNZ (Italy)			HUN (Hungary)		LEC (France)		IMO (Italy)			HOC (Germany)		Pts
Pos	Team	R1	R2	R3	R1	R2	R1	R2	R3	R1	R2	R3	R1	R2	R1	R2	R1	R2	R3	R1	R2	Pts
1	(France) R-ace GP	2	1	5	3	4	2	C	3	2	1	**1**	**1**	**1**	2	2	**1**	6	2	3	2	465
1	(France) R-ace GP	10	7	Ret	5	6	4	C	8	11	22	3	2	2	11	6	17	9	10	14	4	465
1	(France) R-ace GP	22	12	Ret	17	16	6	C	16	Ret	Ret	9	4	18	26	17	Ret	Ret	Ret	Ret	11	465
2	(Netherlands) MP Motorsport	3	5	3	**1**	1	5	C	2	4	4	2	12	13	3	**1**	2	7	12	4	**1**	382
2	(Netherlands) MP Motorsport	4	19	13	7	5	27	C	10	5	20	12	15	26	5	5	4	8	23	13	3	382
2	(Netherlands) MP Motorsport	7	Ret	22	8	9	Ret	C	11	6	Ret	Ret	26	Ret	6	7	14	26	Ret	**19**	15	382
3	(Italy) Prema Racing	**1**	6	4	2	**2**	3	C	5	**1**	2	8	5	3	**1**	3	8	1	4	2	5	323
3	(Italy) Prema Racing	11	10	20	DSQ	7	11	C	21	3	5	18	10	Ret	14	11	15	10	9	7	6	323
3	(Italy) Prema Racing	23	14	**25**†	DSQ	14	16	C	27	17	7	Ret	13	Ret	17	12	Ret	11	Ret	Ret	Ret	323
4	(Italy) CL Motorsport	5	3	1	4	3	13	C	13	8	12	6	16	5	7	24	5	3	3	11	21	151
4	(Italy) CL Motorsport	14	22	16	13	17	23	C	20	14	21	21	18	16	25	26	9	4	5	16	22	151
4	(Italy) CL Motorsport	25	Ret	23	25	20	24	C	24	16	Ret	24	Ret	22	27	Ret	Ret	12	Ret	18	23	151
5	(New Zealand) Rodin Motorsport	12	2	2	6	12	7	C	6	9	10	4	3	4	4	4	12	13	13	9	14	144
5	(New Zealand) Rodin Motorsport	28	15	7	11	15	8	C	12	Ret	18	17	8	9	9	8	13	15	14	10	18	144
5	(New Zealand) Rodin Motorsport	Ret	17	19	12	21	9	C	17	Ret	24	19	24	10	16	14	Ret	25	Ret	22	DSQ	144
6	(Netherlands) Van Amersfoort Racing	13	4	6	9	10	22	C	15	15	3	13	17	6	19	18	10	2	**1**	8	7	90
6	(Netherlands) Van Amersfoort Racing	18	9	17	15	11	Ret	C	23	18	17	16	21	15	22	21	16	16	7	25	19	90
6	(Netherlands) Van Amersfoort Racing	27	20	21	19	23	Ret	C	28†	Ret	23	23	28	27	28	22	25†	24	19	Ret	24	90
7	(France) ART Grand Prix	16	16	8	14	8	**1**	C	9	12	8	11	9	12	12	10	3	5	8	12	10	83
7	(France) ART Grand Prix	21	18	15	21	18	14	C	14	20	14	20	11	17	15	16	6	14	17	20	16	83
7	(France) ART Grand Prix	26	24	18	28	19	21	C	25	Ret	Ret	25†	25	23	Ret	20	7	21	20	21	17	83
8	(Italy) RPM	9	21	9	22	13	15	C	4	7	11	5	14	11	10	9	20	17	15	1	8	74
8	(Italy) RPM	17	25	24†	Ret	24	17	C	19	21	15	15	20	14	18	23	23†	18	16	6	12	74
8	(Italy) RPM	20	Ret	Ret	Ret	Ret	20	C	Ret	DSQ	19	Ret	23	21	21	27	Ret	19	Ret	Ret	13	74
9	(Italy) Trident Motorsport	6	8	10	10	Ret	10	C	**1**	10	13	7	22	20	13	19	11	20	6	5	20	70
9	(Italy) Trident Motorsport	8	11	11	20	Ret	18	C	18	19	Ret	22	27	24	23	Ret	21	Ret	18	23	Ret	70
9	(Italy) Trident Motorsport	19	13	12	27	Ret	19	C	22	Ret	Ret	Ret	29	25	24	Ret	22†	Ret	21	24	Ret	70
10	(Switzerland) G4 Racing	15	23	14	16	22	12	C	7	13	6	10	6	7	8	13	18	22	11	15	9	44
10	(Switzerland) G4 Racing	24	Ret	Ret	24	25	25	C	26	22	9	14	7	8	20	15	19	23	22	17	25	44
10	(Switzerland) G4 Racing	Ret	Ret	Ret	26	26	26	C	Ret	23†	16	Ret	19	19	DNS	25	24†	Ret	Ret	Ret	Ret	44
Pos	Team	R1	R2	R3	R1	R2	R1	R2	R3	R1	R2	R3	R1	R2	R1	R2	R1	R2	R3	R1	R2	Pts
Pos	Team	RBR (Austria)			ZAN (Netherlands)		SPA (Belgium)			MNZ (Italy)			HUN (Hungary)		LEC (France)		IMO (Italy)			HOC (Germany)		Pts
