= 2023 Formula 4 CEZ Championship =

Formula 4 CEZ Championship season

The 2023 Formula 4 CEZ Championship, known as 2023 ACCR Czech Formula prior to the FIA certification in May, was the first season of the Formula 4 CEZ Championship, a motor racing series for the Central Europe regulated according to FIA Formula 4 regulations, and organised and promoted by the Automobile Club of the Czech Republic (ACCR), Krenek Motorsport and HM Sports.

It commenced on 29 April at Hungaroring in Hungary and concluded on 8 October at Balaton Park Circuit in the same country.

== Teams and drivers ==
Team	No.	Driver	Rounds
(Czech Republic) SAPE Motorsport	6	(Czech Republic) Miroslav Mikeš	2–6
(Hungary) Ideal Line Performance / Gender Racing Team	13	(Hungary) Oliver Michl	All
(Czech Republic) JMT Racing	17	(Czech Republic) Jan Rieger	4
(Czech Republic) JMT Racing	65	(Czech Republic) Roman Roubíček	5–6
(Switzerland) Sauter Engineering + Design	21	(Switzerland) Michael Sauter	All
(Switzerland) Jenzer Motorsport	24	(Italy) Simon Zhang (Note: Zhang is a Chinese driver racing under Italian license)	6
(Switzerland) Jenzer Motorsport	25	(Denmark) Mathias Bjerre Jakobsen	2–5
(Switzerland) Jenzer Motorsport	25	(Jamaica) Thomas Gore	6
(Switzerland) Jenzer Motorsport	27	(Switzerland) Ethan Ischer	All
(Switzerland) Jenzer Motorsport	28	(Netherlands) Reno Francot	All
(Switzerland) Jenzer Motorsport	144	(Czech Republic) Max Karhan	4–6
(Austria) Renauer Motorsport	46	(Czech Republic) Jiří Šafránek	1–3
(Austria) Renauer Motorsport	66	(United Kingdom) Nikolas Taylor	1–3
(Germany) PHM Racing	48	(United States) James Egozi	2
(Germany) PHM Racing	57	(Thailand) Nandhavud Bhirombhakdi	2

- William Karlsson was scheduled to compete with Renauer Motorsport but switched to the Eurocup-3 series before the start of the season.
- Karhan was initially supposed to race for the JMT Racing but due to the belated delivery of the car, he switched to Jenzer Motorsport for the round 4.

== Race calendar and results ==
The provisional calendar featuring six round across five countries was published on 3 November 2022. All rounds, except for the Slovakiaring one supporting the European Truck Racing Championship, are a part of the ESET Cup package. The first round at Motorsport Arena Oschersleben on 8–9 April was cancelled and replaced by a standalone event at Balaton Park on 7–8 October.

Rnd.		Circuit/Location	Date	Pole position	Fastest lap	Winning driver	Winning team
1	R1	(Hungary) Hungaroring, Mogyoród	30 April	(Switzerland) Ethan Ischer	(Switzerland) Ethan Ischer	(Switzerland) Ethan Ischer	(Switzerland) Jenzer Motorsport
1	R2	(Hungary) Hungaroring, Mogyoród	30 April		(Switzerland) Ethan Ischer	(Switzerland) Ethan Ischer	(Switzerland) Jenzer Motorsport
2	R1	(Austria) Red Bull Ring, Spielberg	20 May	(United States) James Egozi	(United States) James Egozi	(United States) James Egozi	(Germany) PHM Racing
2	R2	(Austria) Red Bull Ring, Spielberg	21 May		(United States) James Egozi	(United States) James Egozi	(Germany) PHM Racing
3	R1	Automotodróm Slovakia Ring, Orechová Potôň	10 June	(Switzerland) Michael Sauter	(Switzerland) Michael Sauter	(Netherlands) Reno Francot	(Switzerland) Jenzer Motorsport
3	R2	Automotodróm Slovakia Ring, Orechová Potôň	10 June		(Switzerland) Michael Sauter	(Netherlands) Reno Francot	(Switzerland) Jenzer Motorsport
4	R1	(Czech Republic) Autodrom Most, Most	5 August	(Switzerland) Ethan Ischer	(Switzerland) Ethan Ischer	(Switzerland) Ethan Ischer	(Switzerland) Jenzer Motorsport
4	R2	(Czech Republic) Autodrom Most, Most	6 August		(Switzerland) Ethan Ischer	(Switzerland) Ethan Ischer	(Switzerland) Jenzer Motorsport
4	R3	(Czech Republic) Autodrom Most, Most	6 August	(Switzerland) Ethan Ischer	(Switzerland) Ethan Ischer	(Switzerland) Ethan Ischer	(Switzerland) Jenzer Motorsport
5	R1	(Czech Republic) Brno Circuit, Brno	9 September	(Netherlands) Reno Francot	(Switzerland) Michael Sauter	(Netherlands) Reno Francot	(Switzerland) Jenzer Motorsport
5	R2	(Czech Republic) Brno Circuit, Brno	9 September		(Switzerland) Ethan Ischer	(Switzerland) Ethan Ischer	(Switzerland) Jenzer Motorsport
6	R1	(Hungary) Balaton Park Circuit, Balatonfőkajár	7 October	(Switzerland) Ethan Ischer	(Switzerland) Ethan Ischer	(Switzerland) Ethan Ischer	(Switzerland) Jenzer Motorsport
6	R2	(Hungary) Balaton Park Circuit, Balatonfőkajár	8 October		(Switzerland) Michael Sauter	(Switzerland) Michael Sauter	(Switzerland) Sauter Engineering + Design
6	R3	(Hungary) Balaton Park Circuit, Balatonfőkajár	8 October	(Switzerland) Ethan Ischer	(Switzerland) Michael Sauter	(Switzerland) Ethan Ischer	(Switzerland) Jenzer Motorsport

== Championship standings ==
Points are awarded to the top 10 classified finishers in each race. No points are awarded for pole position or fastest lap.

Position	**1st**	**2nd**	**3rd**	**4th**	**5th**	**6th**	**7th**	**8th**	**9th**	**10th**
Points	25	18	15	12	10	8	6	4	2	1

=== Drivers' standings ===
Pos	Driver	HUN (Hungary)		RBR (Austria)		SVK (Slovakia)		MOS (Czech Republic)			BRN (Czech Republic)		BAL (Hungary)			Pts
Pos	Driver	R1	R2	R1	R2	R1	R2	R1	R2	R3	R1	R2	R1	R2	R3	Pts
1	(Switzerland) Ethan Ischer	**1**	1	5	Ret	3	6†	**1**	1	**1**	2	1	**1**	4	**1**	263
2	(Netherlands) Reno Francot	3	2	3	2	1	1	2	2	2	**1**	2	3	2	3	261
3	(Switzerland) Michael Sauter	2	6	4	Ret	**2**	2	4	3	4	3	3	2	1	2	204
4	(Hungary) Oliver Michl	5	4	9	4	5	4	6	7	8	5	4	7	Ret	6	112
5	(Denmark) Mathias Bjerre Jakobsen			6	3	4	3	3	8	3	4	5				106
6	(Czech Republic) Miroslav Mikeš			10	8	6	5	5	5	5	DNS	6	8	7	8	75
7	(Czech Republic) Max Karhan							8	6	7	6	7	6	5	7	56
8	(United States) James Egozi			**1**	1											50
9	(United Kingdom) Nikolas Taylor	4	3	7	5	WD	WD									43
10	(Jamaica) Thomas Gore												4	3	4	39
11	(Czech Republic) Jiří Šafránek	6	5	8	6	WD	WD									30
12	(Italy) Shimo Zhang												5	6	5	28
13	(Czech Republic) Jan Rieger							7	4	6						26
14	(Thailand) Nandhavud Bhirombhakdi			2	7											24
15	(Czech Republic) Roman Roubíček										7	8	9	8	9	18
Pos	Driver	R1	R2	R1	R2	R1	R2	R1	R2	R3	R1	R2	R1	R2	R3	Pts
Pos	Driver	HUN (Hungary)		RBR (Austria)		SVK (Slovakia)		MOS (Czech Republic)			BRN (Czech Republic)		BAL (Hungary)			Pts

Colour	Result
Gold	Winner
Silver	Second place
Bronze	Third place
Green	Points classification
Blue	Non-points classification
Blue	Non-classified finish (NC)
Purple	Retired, not classified (Ret)
Red	Did not qualify (DNQ)
Red	Did not pre-qualify (DNPQ)
Black	Disqualified (DSQ)
White	Did not start (DNS)
White	Withdrew (WD)
White	Race cancelled (C)
Blank	Did not practice (DNP)
Blank	Did not arrive (DNA)
Blank	Excluded (EX)

**Bold** – Pole
Italics – Fastest Lap

- † – Driver did not finish the race, but was classified as they completed over 75% of the race distance.

=== Teams' standings ===
Pos	Driver	HUN (Hungary)		RBR (Austria)		SVK (Slovakia)		MOS (Czech Republic)			BRN (Czech Republic)		BAL (Hungary)			Pts
Pos	Driver	R1	R2	R1	R2	R1	R2	R1	R2	R3	R1	R2	R1	R2	R3	Pts
1	(Switzerland) Jenzer Motorsport	1	1	3	2	1	1	1	1	1	1	1	1	2	1	549
1	(Switzerland) Jenzer Motorsport	3	2	5	3	3	3	2	2	2	2	2	3	3	3	549
2	(Switzerland) Sauter Engineering + Design	2	6	4	Ret	2	2	4	3	4	3	3	2	1	2	204
3	(Hungary) Ideal Line Performance / Gender Racing Team	5	4	9	4	5	4	6	7	8	5	4	7	Ret	6	112
4	(Czech Republic) SAPE Motorsport			10	8	6	5	5	5	5	DNS	6	8	7	8	75
5	(Germany) PHM Racing			1	1											74
5	(Germany) PHM Racing			2	7											74
6	(Austria) Renauer Motorsport	4	3	7	5	WD	WD									73
6	(Austria) Renauer Motorsport	6	5	8	6	WD	WD									73
7	(Czech Republic) JMT Racing							7	4	6	7	8	9	8	9	44
Pos	Driver	R1	R2	R1	R2	R1	R2	R1	R2	R3	R1	R2	R1	R2	R3	Pts
Pos	Driver	HUN (Hungary)		RBR (Austria)		SVK (Slovakia)		MOS (Czech Republic)			BRN (Czech Republic)		BAL (Hungary)			Pts
