= Kazuhisa Urabe =

Japanese racing driver (born 2005)

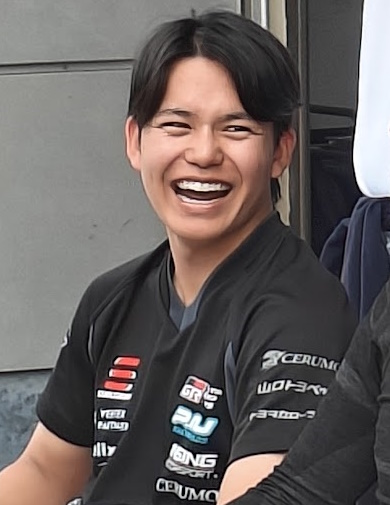
- Urabe in 2026
- Nationality: (Japan) Japanese
- Born: 25 April 2005 (age 21) Shūnan, Yamaguchi, Japan

Super Formula Lights career
- Debut season: 2025
- Current team: Delightworks Racing
- Car number: 2
- Former teams: B-Max Racing Team
- Starts: 36
- Wins: 0
- Podiums: 0
- Poles: 0
- Fastest laps: 1
- Best finish: 7th in 2026

Previous series
- 2025 2025 2024-2025 2024 2024 2022-2024: TSS The Super Series; Porsche Carrera Cup Japan; FR Japanese; SRO Japan Cup - GT4; Super Taikyu; F4 Japanese
- Statistics up to date as of 21 September 2026.

Kazuhisa Urabe (卜部和久, Urabe Kazuhisa; born 25 April 2005) is a Japanese racing driver affiliated with Toyota Gazoo Racing who currently competes in Super GT for Hyper Water Racing INGING and in Super Formula Lights for Delightworks Racing.

== Career ==
=== Formula 4 ===
Urabe started his Formula 4 career in 2022 with Bionic Jack Racing. Urabe only managed to get seven points that season. He stayed with the same team for 2023. Urabe achieved his maiden pole position and won race one at Sportsland SUGO. He ended the season eighth in the standings. Urabe stayed in the championship for 2024, switching to TGR-DC Racing School for his third season.

=== Japan Cup ===
In 2024, Urabe replaced Seita Nonaka at Toyota Gazoo Racing Indonesia in the Japan Cup Series - GT4, at Fuji Speedway as Nonaka prioritised his Super Formula Lights season. He achieved a win, and a third place.

=== Super Taikyu ===
Urabe made his debut in the ST-X class of Super Taikyu with 2W Zoomies x GR Garage Yamaguchi-Shunan alongside Yuji Tachikawa, Hibiki Taira, Kachorn Chiaravanont, Andrew & Warren Adulayavichitr for the Fuji 24 Hours.

=== Formula Regional Japanese Championship ===
in 2024, Urabe would compete in Formula Regional Japanese Championship with TGR-DC Racing School for the last two rounds at Fuji Speedway alongside Yuki Sano. Urabe would run the full season in the series with B-Max Racing.

=== Super Formula Lights ===
In 2025, Urabe competed in the Super Formula Lights with B-Max Racing.

== Racing record ==
=== Career summary ===
Season	Series	Team	Races	Wins	Poles	FLaps	Podiums	Points	Position
2022	F4 Japanese Championship	Bionic Jack Racing	14	0	0	0	0	7	18th
2022	Super-FJ Suzuka Series	MYST	6	0	0	0	0	30	4th
2022	Super-FJ Motegi/SUGO Series	MYST	1	0	0	0	1	12	15th
2022	JAF Formula 4 Championship	MYST	0	0	0	0	0	0	39th
2023	F4 Japanese Championship	Bionic Jack Racing	14	1	1	0	1	72	8th
2024	F4 Japanese Championship	TGR-DC Racing School	13	0	0	0	0	39	11th
2024	Formula Regional Japanese Championship	TGR-DC Racing School	4	0	1	0	3	51	9th
2024	Super Taikyu - ST-Z	2W Zoomies x GR Garage Yamaguchi-Shunan	1	0	0	0	0	7‡	10th
2024	TSS The Super Series - Supercar GT4	2W Zoomies	4	1	1	1	3	60	8th
2024	SRO Japan Cup - GT4	Toyota Gazoo Racing Indonesia	2	1	0	0	2	40	9th
2025	Porsche Carrera Cup Japan	Hyper Water Racing	11	3	5	3	7	199	**3rd**
2025	Formula Regional Japanese Championship	B-Max Racing Team	12	3	1	0	10	187	**3rd**
2025	Super Formula Lights	B-Max Racing Team	18	0	0	1	0	5	10th
2025	TSS The Super Series - GT4	Inging Autowerks Racing	4	1	1	0	2	60	8th
2025	Super GT - GT300	Hyper Water Racing INGING	2	0	0	0	0	0	NC
2026	Super GT - GT300	Hyper Water Racing INGING	8	0	0	0	1	65	6th
2026	Super Formula Lights	Delightworks Racing	18	0	0	0	1	30	7th
2026	Super Formula	Sanki Vertex Partners Cerumo・Inging	2	0	0	0	0	0*	24th*

^{*} Season still in progress.
‡ Team standings

=== Complete F4 Japanese Championship results ===
(key) (Races in bold indicate pole position) (Races in italics indicate fastest lap)

Year	Team	1	2	3	4	5	6	7	8	9	10	11	12	13	14	DC	Pts
2022	Bionic Jack Racing	FUJ1; 1; 9	FUJ1; 2; 37	SUZ; 1; 25	SUZ; 2; 19	FUJ2; 1; 14	FUJ2; 2; 13	SUZ2; 1; 8	SUZ2; 2; 10	SUG; 1; 18	SUG; 2; 19	AUT; 1; 19	AUT; 2; 14	MOT; 1; 17	MOT; 2; 19	18th	7
2023	Bionic Jack Racing	FUJ1; 1; 20	FUJ1; 2; 8	SUZ; 1; 43†	SUZ; 2; 10	FUJ2; 1; 10	FUJ2; 2; 12	SUZ2; 1; 9	SUZ2; 2; 6	SUG; 1; 7	**SUG**; **2**; 1	AUT; 1; 10	AUT; 2; 7	MOT; 1; 5	MOT; 2; 6	8th	72
2024	TGR-DC Racing School	FUJ1; 1; 5	FUJ1; 2 DNS	SUZ; 1; 8	SUZ; 2; 10	FUJ2; 1; 20	FUJ2; 2 Ret	SUG; 1; 4	SUG; 2; 3	AUT; 1; 9	MOT; 1; 13	MOT; 2; 5	MOT; 3 Ret	SUZ2; 1; 14	SUZ2; 2 Ret	11th	39

=== Complete Formula Regional Japanese Championship results ===
(key) (Races in bold indicate pole position) (Races in italics indicate fastest lap)

Year	Entrant	1	2	3	4	5	6	7	8	9	10	11	12	13	14	15	Pos	Points
2024	TGR-DC Racing School	SUZ; 1	SUZ; 2	SUZ; 3	SUG; 1	SUG; 2	OKA; 1	OKA; 2	OKA; 3	MOT; 1	MOT; 2	FUJ1; 1 Ret	FUJ1; 2; 3	**FUJ2**; **1**; 2	FUJ2; 2; 2		9th	51
2025	B-Max Racing Team	OKA; 1; 2	OKA; 2; 5	OKA; 3; 4	FUJ1; 1; 3	FUJ1; 2; 13	SUZ1; 1; 1	SUZ1; 2; 3	SUG; 1	SUG; 2	SUG; 3	FUJ2; 1; 3	FUJ2; 2; 2	SUZ2; 1; 2	**SUZ2**; **2**; 1	SUZ2; 3; 1	3rd	187

^{*} Season still in progress.

=== Complete Super Formula Lights results ===
(key) (Races in bold indicate pole position) (Races in italics indicate fastest lap)

Year	Entrant	1	2	3	4	5	6	7	8	9	10	11	12	13	14	15	16	17	18	Pos	Points
2025	B-Max Racing Team	SUZ; 1; 6	SUZ; 2; 5	SUZ; 3; 10	AUT; 1; 9	AUT; 2; 8	OKA; 1; 11	OKA; 2; 9	OKA; 3; 9	SUG; 1; 8	SUG; 2; 6	SUG; 3; 13	SUG; 4; 6	FUJ; 1; 7	FUJ; 2; 10	FUJ; 3; 9	MOT; 1; 7	MOT; 2 Ret	MOT; 3; 7	10th	5
2026	Delightworks Racing	FUJ; 1; 4	FUJ; 2; 5	FUJ; 3; 5	AUT; 1; 8	AUT; 2; 8	AUT; 3; 7	SUZ; 1; 6	SUZ; 2; 5	SUZ; 3 Ret	OKA; 1; 5	OKA; 2; 2	OKA; 3; 4	SUG; 1; 10	SUG; 2; 8	SUG; 3; 8	MOT; 1; 4	MOT; 2; 5	MOT; 3; 4	7th	30

=== Complete Super GT results ===
(key) (Races in bold indicate pole position; races in italics indicate fastest lap)

Year	Team	Car	Class	1	2	3	4	5	6	7	8	9	DC	Points
2025	Hyper Water Racing INGING	Toyota GR86 GT300	GT300	OKA	FUJ; 3†	SEP	FS1	FS2	SUZ	SUG	AUT; 12†	MOT	NC	0
2026	Hyper Water Racing INGING	Toyota GR86 GT300	GT300	OKA; 2	FUJ; 5	FUJ; 7	SUZ; 20	SUG; 17	AUT; 4	MOT; 12	MOT; 8		6th	65

^{†}Urabe entered the race as a third driver and did not fulfill minimum drive time requirements, and was thus ineligible for championship points.
* Season still in progress.
