= Reno Francot =

Dutch racing driver (born 2007)

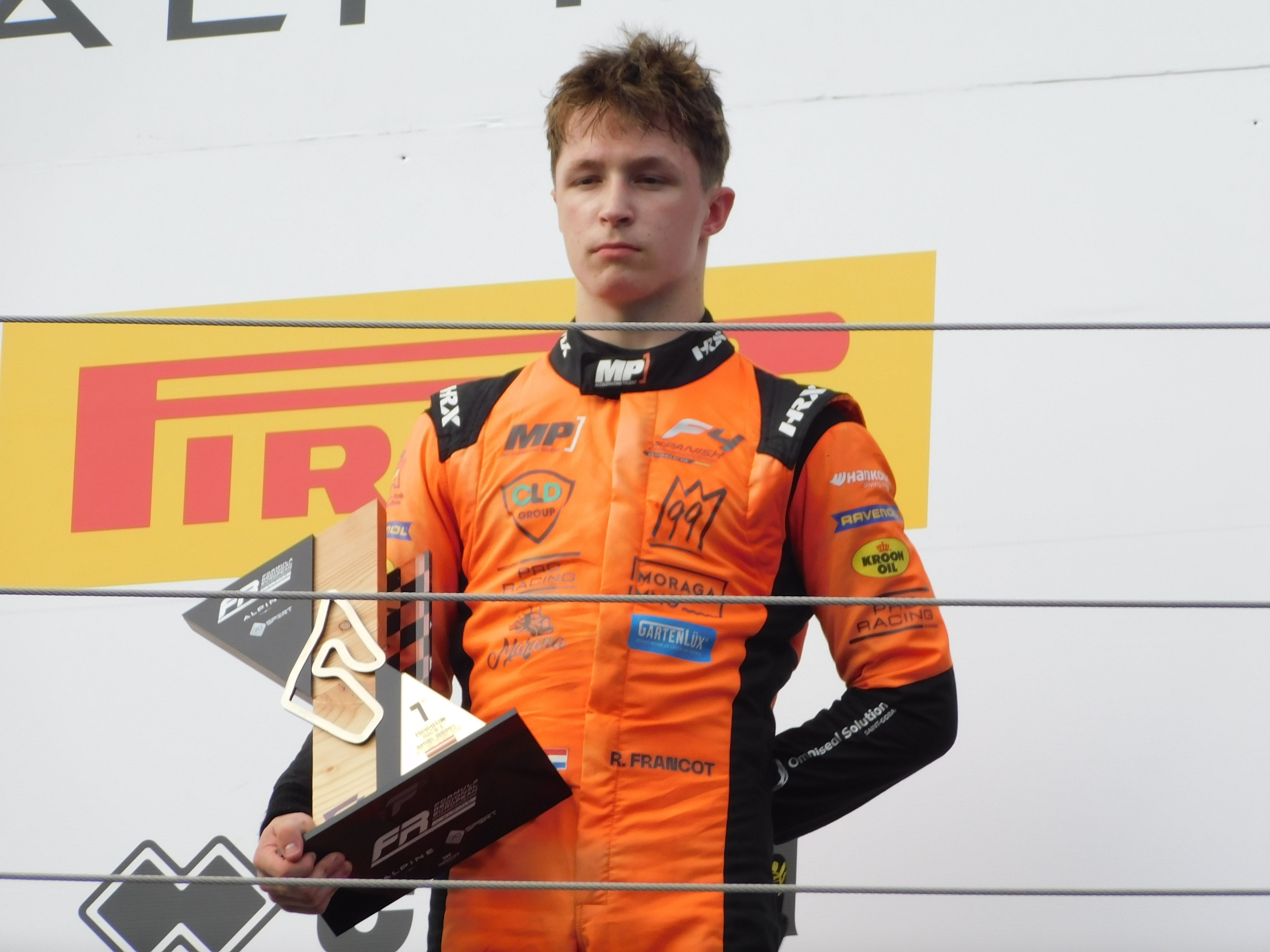
- Francot in 2025
- Born: Reno Fernon Francot; 2 November 2007 (age 19); Echt-Susteren, Netherlands
- Nationality: (Netherlands) Dutch

Formula Regional European Championship career
- Debut season: 2025
- Current team: CL Motorsport
- Car number: 69
- Former teams: RPM
- Starts: 21
- Wins: 1
- Podiums: 5
- Poles: 0
- Fastest laps: 0
- Best finish: 5th in 2026

Previous series
- 2026 2025–2026 2025 2024 2024–2025 2024 2024 2023–2025 2023: FR Middle East; Eurocup-4 Spanish Winter; F4 Middle East; Formula Trophy UAE; Euro 4/E4; Italian F4; Formula Winter Series; F4 Spanish; F4 CEZ
- Statistics up to date as of 14 September 2026.

Reno Fernon Francot (born 2 November 2007) is a Dutch racing driver who last competed in the Formula Regional European Championship with CL Motorsport.

He previously spent three seasons in Formula 4, most notably placing third in the 2025 E4 Championship for PHM Racing.

== Career ==
=== Karting and single-seater debut (2020–2024) ===
Francot initially took up football before switching to competitive karting in 2020. During his three-year career in karts, Francot finished third in the Mini Max class of the 2020 BNL Karting Series, finished fourth in the 2021 Karting Academy Trophy and drove for Birel Art in his final year of karting.

Despite planning to move up to OK for 2023, Francot opted to step up to single-seaters for that year, joining Jenzer Motorsport to race in the Formula 4 CEZ Championship. In the first two rounds of the season at the Hungaroring and Red Bull Ring, Francot took a pair of second- and third-place finishes, before winning both races at the Slovakia Ring and finishing second in all three races at Most. Francot then took his third and final win of the season at Brno, before finishing all three races at Balaton Park to miss out on the title by two points over Ethan Ischer. During 2023, Francot made a one-off appearance in the F4 Spanish Championship for MP Motorsport at Valencia, taking a best result of 11th in race one.

The following year, Francot remained with Jenzer Motorsport to race in the Italian F4 Championship and the final round of the Euro 4 Championship. In his only full-season in the series, he took a best result of fourth in race three at Le Castellet and scored four more points finishes to end the year 14th in the overall standings. During 2024, Francot also raced for GRS Team on a part-time basis in Formula Winter Series and F4 Spanish Championship, and also made a one-off appearance in the Formula Trophy UAE for Evans GP at Yas Marina, finishing both races on the podium.

=== Breakout season in Formula 4 (2025) ===
In early 2025, Francot joined AKCEL GP / PHM Racing to race in the F4 Middle East Championship. In the five-race winter series, Francot took three podiums and his only win of the season, coming at race two of the third Yas Marina round, as he ended the winter fifth in points. For the rest of the year, Francot returned to MP Motorsport to make his full-time debut in the F4 Spanish Championship, whilst also taking part in the Eurocup-4 Spanish Winter Championship. In the Spanish Winter Championship, Francot partook in the final two rounds of the season, in which he only scored three points finishes, taking a best result of fourth, as he ended the three-round series 12th in points. In the main series, Francot took his first podium of the season in race one at Algarve by finishing third, a feat which he repeated the following round at Le Castellet in race three. In the main series, Francot scored his only win of the season in race two at Barcelona from pole and scored five more podiums to end the year fifth in points.

In July, Francot returned to the Italian F4 Championship with PHM Racing from Mugello onwards and also joining them for a full campaign in the E4 Championship. Taking part in four rounds, Francot most notably scored his maiden series podiums at Mugello, finishing third in race two and second in race one, en route to a 12th-place points finish. In the E4 Championship meanwhile, Francot took his first series win in race two at Le Castellet, before taking two more podiums in the following round at Mugello by finishing third in races two and three. Francot then ended the season with a third-place finish in race two at Monza to secure a third-place points finish in the overall standings. In September, Francot made his debut in the Formula Regional European Championship for RPM at the Red Bull Ring. In his only round of the season, Francot finished tenth in race two as the highest-finishing rookie.

=== Race winner in Formula Regional (2026) ===
Francot began 2026 by competing in the final two rounds of the Formula Regional Middle East Trophy for CL Motorsport, taking a best result of 13th in race two at Dubai. Following that, Francot returned to MP-run KCL Motorsport to race in the Eurocup-4 Spanish Winter Championship, in which he scored a pair of podiums en route to fifth in the overall standings. For the rest of the year, Francot returned to CL Motorsport to compete in the Formula Regional European Championship. After clinching his maiden series win at the Red Bull Ring, Francot scored further podiums at Zandvoort and Imola en route to fifth in the overall standings.

== Karting record ==
=== Karting career summary ===
Season	Series	Team	Position
2020	BNL Karting Series – Mini Max	GKS Lemmens Power	3rd
2020	RMC International Trophy – Mini Max	GKS Lemmens Power	4th
2021	Champions of the Future – OK-J	Expirit Racing Team; Tony Kart Racing Team (Note: Francot competed for Expirit Racing Team in Rounds 1-2 and for Tony Kart Racing Team in round 3.)	46th
2021	Karting European Championship – OK-J	Expirit Racing Team	34th
2021	WSK Euro Series – OK-J	Expirit Racing Team	94th
2021	Karting Academy Trophy	Francot, Fernon	4th
2021	Karting World Championship – OK-J	Tony Kart Racing Team	NC
2022	WSK Super Master Series – OK-J	Birel Art Racing	38th
2022	Champions of the Future Winter Series – OK-J	Birel Art Racing	11th
2022	Champions of the Future – OK-J	Birel Art Racing	56th
2022	Karting European Championship – OK-J	Birel Art Racing	43rd
2022	WSK Euro Series – OK-J	Birel Art Racing	28th
2022	Karting World Championship – OK-J	Birel Art Racing	NC

== Racing record ==
=== Racing career summary ===
Season	Series	Team	Races	Wins	Poles	F/Laps	Podiums	Points	Position
2023	Formula 4 CEZ Championship	Jenzer Motorsport	14	3	1	0	14	261	**2nd**
2023	F4 Spanish Championship	MP Motorsport	3	0	0	0	0	0	NC†
2024	Formula Winter Series	GRS Team	2	0	0	0	0	2	27th
2024	F4 Spanish Championship	GRS Team	3	0	0	0	0	0	33rd
2024	F4 Spanish Championship	Saintéloc Racing	3	0	0	0	0	0	33rd
2024	Italian F4 Championship	Jenzer Motorsport	21	0	0	0	0	34	14th
2024	Euro 4 Championship	Jenzer Motorsport	3	0	0	0	0	0	27th
2024	Formula Trophy UAE	Evans GP	2	0	0	1	2	33	10th
2025	F4 Middle East Championship	AKCEL GP / PHM Racing	15	1	0	0	4	187	5th
2025	Eurocup-4 Spanish Winter Championship	KCL by MP Motorsport	6	0	0	0	0	28	12th
2025	F4 Spanish Championship	KCL by MP Motorsport	21	1	1	3	5	154	5th
2025	Italian F4 Championship	PHM Racing	9	0	0	0	2	47	12th
2025	E4 Championship	PHM Racing	9	1	0	1	4	108	**3rd**
2025	Formula Regional European Championship	RPM	2	0	0	0	0	1	20th
2026	Eurocup-4 Spanish Winter Championship	KCL Motorsport	9	0	0	2	2	58	5th
2026	Formula Regional Middle East Trophy	CL Motorsport	5	0	0	0	0	0	29th
2026	Formula Regional European Championship	CL Motorsport	19	1	0	0	5	123	5th

=== Complete Formula 4 CEZ Championship results ===
(key) (Races in bold indicate pole position) (Races in italics indicate fastest lap)

Year	Team	1	2	3	4	5	6	7	8	9	10	11	12	13	14	DC	Points
2023	Jenzer Motorsport	HUN; 1; 3	HUN; 2; 2	RBR; 1; 3	RBR; 2; 2	SVK; 1; 1	SVK; 2; 1	MOS; 1; 2	MOS; 2; 2	MOS; 3; 2	**BRN**; **1**; 1	BRN; 2; 2	BAL; 1; 3	BAL; 2; 2	BAL; 3; 3	2nd	261

=== Complete F4 Spanish Championship results ===
(key) (Races in bold indicate pole position) (Races in italics indicate fastest lap)

Year	Team	1	2	3	4	5	6	7	8	9	10	11	12	13	14	15	16	17	18	19	20	21	DC	Points
2023	MP Motorsport	SPA; 1	SPA; 2	SPA; 3	ARA; 1	ARA; 2	ARA; 3	NAV; 1	NAV; 2	NAV; 3	JER; 1	JER; 2	JER; 3	EST; 1	EST; 2	EST; 3	CRT; 1; 11	CRT; 2; 15	CRT; 3; 17	BAR; 1	BAR; 2	BAR; 3	NC†	0
2024	GRS Team	JAR; 1	JAR; 2	JAR; 3	ALG; 1	ALG; 2	ALG; 3	LEC; 1	LEC; 2	LEC; 3	ARA; 1	ARA; 2	ARA; 3	CRT; 1; 16	CRT; 2; 16	CRT; 3; 31	JER; 1	JER; 2	JER; 3				33rd	0
2024	Saintéloc Racing																			BAR; 1; 18	BAR; 2; 17	BAR; 3; 15	33rd	0
2025	KCL by MP Motorsport	ARA; 1; 13	ARA; 2; 8	ARA; 3; 17	NAV; 1; 4	NAV; 2; 4	NAV; 3; 6	POR; 1; 3	POR; 2; 20	POR; 3; 30†	LEC; 1; 7	LEC; 2; 8	LEC; 3; 3	JER; 1; 4	JER; 2; 29	JER; 3; 11	CRT; 1; 5	CRT; 2; 5	CRT; 3; 3	CAT; 1; 34	**CAT**; **2**; 1	CAT; 3; 2	5th	154

† As Francot was a guest driver, he was ineligible for points.

=== Complete Formula Winter Series results ===
(key) (Races in bold indicate pole position) (Races in italics indicate fastest lap)

Year	Team	1	2	3	4	5	6	7	8	9	10	11	12	DC	Points
2024	GRS Team	JER; 1	JER; 2	JER; 3	CRT; 1	CRT; 2	CRT; 3	ARA; 1	ARA; 2	ARA; 3	BAR; 1 C	BAR; 2; 18	BAR; 3; 9	27th	2

=== Complete Italian F4 Championship results ===
(key) (Races in bold indicate pole position) (Races in italics indicate fastest lap)

Year	Team	1	2	3	4	5	6	7	8	9	10	11	12	13	14	15	16	17	18	19	20	21	22	23	24	25	DC	Points
2024	Jenzer Motorsport	MIS; 1; 12	MIS; 2; 9	MIS; 3; 7	IMO; 1 Ret	IMO; 2; 8	IMO; 3; 24	VAL; 1; 22	VAL; 2; 14	VAL; 3; 17	MUG; 1; 9	MUG; 2; 12	MUG; 3 Ret	LEC; 1; 11	LEC; 2 Ret	LEC; 3; 4	BAR; 1; 12	BAR; 2; 20	BAR; 3 Ret	MON; 1; 34†	MON; 2; 17	MON; 3; 6					14th	34
2025	PHM Racing	MIS1; 1	MIS1; 2	MIS1; 3	MIS1; 4	VLL; 1	VLL; 2	VLL; 3	VLL; 4	MNZ; 1	MNZ; 2	MNZ; 3	MUG; 1; 18	MUG; 2; 3	MUG; 3; 2	IMO; 1; 5	IMO; 2 C	IMO; 3; 22	CAT; 1	CAT; 2	CAT; 3	MIS2; 1; 25	MIS2; 2	MIS2; 3; 9	MIS2; 4; 13	MIS2; 5; 9	12th	47

=== Complete Euro 4 Championship results ===
(key) (Races in bold indicate pole position) (Races in italics indicate fastest lap)

Year	Team	1	2	3	4	5	6	7	8	9	DC	Points
2024	Jenzer Motorsport	MUG; 1	MUG; 2	MUG; 3	RBR; 1	RBR; 2	RBR; 3	MON; 1 Ret	MON; 2; 22	MON; 3; 12	27th	0
2025	PHM Racing	LEC; 1; 5	LEC; 2; 1	LEC; 3; 6	MUG; 1; 28†	MUG; 2; 3	MUG; 3; 3	MNZ; 1; 6	MNZ; 2; 3	MNZ; 3; 4	3rd	108

=== Complete Formula Trophy UAE results ===
(key) (Races in bold indicate pole position) (Races in italics indicate fastest lap)

Year	Team	1	2	3	4	5	6	7	DC	Points
2024	Evans GP	DUB; 1	DUB; 2	DUB; 3	YMC1; 1; 2	YMC1; 2; 3	YMC2; 1	YMC2; 2	10th	33

=== Complete F4 Middle East Championship results ===
(key) (Races in bold indicate pole position; races in italics indicate fastest lap)

Year	Team	1	2	3	4	5	6	7	8	9	10	11	12	13	14	15	DC	Points
2025	AKCEL GP / PHM Racing	YMC1; 1; 6	YMC1; 2; 6	YMC1; 3; 4	YMC2; 1; 6	YMC2; 2; 2	YMC2; 3; 4	DUB; 1; 17	DUB; 2; 26	DUB; 3; 4	YMC3; 1; 9	YMC3; 2; 1	YMC3; 3; 8	LUS; 1; 6	LUS; 2; 2	LUS; 3; 3	5th	187

=== Complete Eurocup-4 Spanish Winter Championship results ===
(key) (Races in bold indicate pole position) (Races in italics indicate fastest lap)

Year	Team	1	2	3	4	5	6	7	8	9	DC	Points
2025	KCL by MP Motorsport	JER; 1	JER; 2	JER; 3	POR; 1; 6	POR; 2; 4	POR; 3; 5	NAV; 1; 21	NAV; 2; 12	NAV; 3; 18	12th	28
2026	KCL Motorsport	POR; 1; 9	POR; SPR; 4	POR; 2; 4	JAR; 1; 6	JAR; SPR; 3	JAR; 2; 6	ARA; 1; 9	ARA; SPR; 2	ARA; 2; 26†	5th	58

=== Complete Formula Regional European Championship results ===
(key) (Races in bold indicate pole position) (Races in italics indicate fastest lap)

Year	Team	1	2	3	4	5	6	7	8	9	10	11	12	13	14	15	16	17	18	19	20	DC	Points
2025	RPM	MIS; 1	MIS; 2	SPA; 1	SPA; 2	ZAN; 1	ZAN; 2	HUN; 1	HUN; 2	LEC; 1	LEC; 2	IMO; 1	IMO; 2	RBR; 1; 16	RBR; 2; 10	CAT; 1	CAT; 2	HOC; 1	HOC; 2	MNZ; 1	MNZ; 2	20th	1
2026	CL Motorsport	RBR; 1; 5	RBR; 2; 3	RBR; 3; 1	ZAN; 1; 4	ZAN; 2; 3	SPA; 1; 13	SPA; 2 C	SPA; 3; 20	MNZ; 1; 8	MNZ; 2; 21	MNZ; 3; 21	HUN; 1 Ret	HUN; 2; 5	LEC; 1; 7	LEC; 2 Ret	IMO; 1; 5	IMO; 2; 3	IMO; 3; 3	HOC; 1; 18	HOC; 2; 21	5th	123

=== Complete Formula Regional Middle East Trophy results ===
(key) (Races in bold indicate pole position) (Races in italics indicate fastest lap)

Year	Entrant	1	2	3	4	5	6	7	8	9	10	11	12	DC	Points
2026	CL Motorsport	YMC1; 1	YMC1; 2	YMC1; 3	YMC2; 1	YMC2; 2	YMC2; 3	DUB; 1; 20	DUB; 2; 13	DUB; 3; 29†	LUS; 1; 14	LUS; 2 C	LUS; 3; 22	29th	0
