= 2024 Formula Regional Japanese Championship =

Motor racing competition

The 2024 Formula Regional Japanese Championship was a multi-event, Formula Regional open-wheel single seater motor racing championship held in Japan. The drivers competed in Formula Regional cars that conform to the FIA Formula Regional regulations for the championship. This was the fifth season of the series, promoted by New Pacific Sports Marketing Inc., and the 46th overall season of an FIA ladder series (dating to the 1979 Japanese Formula 3 Championship).

The season started on 9 March at Suzuka International Racing Course and ran over six weekends, until 13 October. All three titles were wrapped up at the penultimate round of the season, with Michael Sauter becoming the first foreign driver to win the Drivers' Championship, while his team Birth Racing Project【BRP】took the Teams' Championship and N-SPEED driver "Yugo" topped the Masters' class.

== Teams and drivers ==
All teams and drivers competed using the Dome F111/3 Regional F3 car, powered by an Alfa Romeo engine and with Dunlop tires.

Team	No.	Driver	Status	Rounds
(Japan) Delightworks Racing	2	(Japan) Yugo Iwasawa		6
(Japan) Sutekina Racing Team	3	(Japan) Jiei Okuzumi		1
(Japan) Sutekina Racing Team	3	(Japan) Fuma Horio		2–4
(Japan) Birth Racing Project【BRP】	5	(Switzerland) Michael Sauter		All
(Japan) Birth Racing Project【BRP】	55	(New Zealand) Sebastian Manson		All
(Japan) Rn-sports	11	(Japan) "Motoki"	M	1
(Japan) Rn-sports	11	(Japan) Masayuki Ueda	M	5–6
(Japan) Rn-sports	78	(Japan) Yuta Fujiwara		6
(Japan) Abbey Racing	16	(Japan) "Akita"	M	1, 5
(Japan) NILZZ Racing	18	(Japan) "Yuki"	M	4–6
(Japan) N-SPEED	23	(Japan) "Yugo”	M	All
(Japan) TOM'S Formula	28	(Japan) Yoshiaki Nakamura		All
(Japan) Eagle Sports	29	(Philippines) Juancho Brobio		1
(Japan) Eagle Sports	29	(Japan) Tadakazu Kojima	M	5
(China) Sky Motorsports	36	(China) Wang Zhongwei		1, 6
(Japan) TGR-DC Racing School	37	(Japan) Yuki Sano		5–6
(Japan) TGR-DC Racing School	38	(Japan) Kazuhisa Urabe		5–6
(Japan) PONOS Racing	45	(Japan) Yorikatsu Tsujiko	M	1, 3, 5–6
(Japan) Bionic Jack Racing	51	(Japan) Kizuku Hirota		1
(Japan) Bionic Jack Racing	51	(United Kingdom) Alfie Briggs		2
(Japan) Bionic Jack Racing	53	(Australia) Jesse Lacey		All
(Japan) HELM Motorsports	62	(Japan) Anna Inotsume		All

Icon	Legend
M	Masters' Class

== Race calendar ==
The 2024 calendar was revealed in late September 2023 and comprised 14 races over six rounds. The championship supported Super Formula for the first time in its history.

Round		Circuit	Date	Support Bill	Map of circuit locations
1	R1	Suzuka International Racing Course, Suzuka	9 March	Super Formula Championship; All Japan Road Race Championship	2024 Formula Regional Japanese Championship is located in Japan
1	R2	Suzuka International Racing Course, Suzuka	9 March	Super Formula Championship; All Japan Road Race Championship	2024 Formula Regional Japanese Championship is located in Japan
1	R3	Suzuka International Racing Course, Suzuka	10 March	Super Formula Championship; All Japan Road Race Championship	2024 Formula Regional Japanese Championship is located in Japan
2	R4	Sportsland Sugo, Murata	11 May	Sugo Champion Cup; TCR Japan Touring Car Series	2024 Formula Regional Japanese Championship is located in Japan
2	R5	Sportsland Sugo, Murata	12 May	Sugo Champion Cup; TCR Japan Touring Car Series	2024 Formula Regional Japanese Championship is located in Japan
3	R6	Okayama International Circuit, Mimasaka	29 June	Porsche Carrera Cup Japan; Okayama Challenge Cup; Mini Challenge Japan; BMW M2 CS Racing Series	2024 Formula Regional Japanese Championship is located in Japan
3	R7	Okayama International Circuit, Mimasaka	30 June	Porsche Carrera Cup Japan; Okayama Challenge Cup; Mini Challenge Japan; BMW M2 CS Racing Series	2024 Formula Regional Japanese Championship is located in Japan
3	R8	Okayama International Circuit, Mimasaka	30 June	Porsche Carrera Cup Japan; Okayama Challenge Cup; Mini Challenge Japan; BMW M2 CS Racing Series	2024 Formula Regional Japanese Championship is located in Japan
4	R9	Mobility Resort Motegi, Motegi	24 August	Super Formula Championship; All Japan Road Race Championship	2024 Formula Regional Japanese Championship is located in Japan
4	R10	Mobility Resort Motegi, Motegi	25 August	Super Formula Championship; All Japan Road Race Championship	2024 Formula Regional Japanese Championship is located in Japan
5	R11	Fuji Speedway, Oyama	14 September	FIA World Endurance Championship (6 Hours of Fuji)	2024 Formula Regional Japanese Championship is located in Japan
5	R12	Fuji Speedway, Oyama	14 September	FIA World Endurance Championship (6 Hours of Fuji)	2024 Formula Regional Japanese Championship is located in Japan
6	R13	Fuji Speedway, Oyama	12 October	Super Formula Championship	2024 Formula Regional Japanese Championship is located in Japan
6	R14	Fuji Speedway, Oyama	13 October	Super Formula Championship	2024 Formula Regional Japanese Championship is located in Japan

== Race results ==
Round		Circuit	Pole position	Fastest lap	Winning driver	Winning team	Masters' class winner
1	R1	Suzuka International Racing Course	(Japan) Kizuku Hirota	(Japan) Jiei Okuzumi	(Japan) Jiei Okuzumi	(Japan) Sutekina Racing Team	(Japan) "Motoki"
1	R2	Suzuka International Racing Course	(Switzerland) Michael Sauter	(Switzerland) Michael Sauter	(Switzerland) Michael Sauter	(Japan) Birth Racing Project【BRP】	(Japan) "Akita"
1	R3	Suzuka International Racing Course	(Japan) Jiei Okuzumi	(Switzerland) Michael Sauter	(Switzerland) Michael Sauter	(Japan) Birth Racing Project【BRP】	(Japan) "Motoki"
2	R4	Sportsland Sugo	(Japan) Fuma Horio	(Switzerland) Michael Sauter	(Japan) Fuma Horio	(Japan) Sutekina Racing Team	(Japan) "Yugo"
2	R5	Sportsland Sugo	(New Zealand) Sebastian Manson	(Switzerland) Michael Sauter	(Japan) Fuma Horio	(Japan) Sutekina Racing Team	(Japan) "Yugo"
3	R6	Okayama International Circuit	(Switzerland) Michael Sauter	(Switzerland) Michael Sauter	(Switzerland) Michael Sauter	(Japan) Birth Racing Project【BRP】	(Japan) "Yugo"
3	R7	Okayama International Circuit	(Switzerland) Michael Sauter	(Switzerland) Michael Sauter	(Australia) Jesse Lacey	(Japan) Bionic Jack Racing	(Japan) Yorikatsu Tsujiko
3	R8	Okayama International Circuit	(Switzerland) Michael Sauter	(Switzerland) Michael Sauter	(Switzerland) Michael Sauter	(Japan) Birth Racing Project【BRP】	(Japan) Yorikatsu Tsujiko
4	R9	Mobility Resort Motegi	(New Zealand) Sebastian Manson	(New Zealand) Sebastian Manson	(Switzerland) Michael Sauter	(Japan) Birth Racing Project【BRP】	(Japan) "Yuki"
4	R10	Mobility Resort Motegi	(Switzerland) Michael Sauter	(Switzerland) Michael Sauter	(Switzerland) Michael Sauter	(Japan) Birth Racing Project【BRP】	(Japan) "Yuki"
5	R11	Fuji Speedway	(Japan) Yuki Sano	(Japan) Yuki Sano	(Japan) Yuki Sano	(Japan) TGR-DC Racing School	(Japan) "Akita"
5	R12	Fuji Speedway	(Japan) Yuki Sano	(Japan) Yoshiaki Nakamura	(Japan) Yuki Sano	(Japan) TGR-DC Racing School	(Japan) "Akita"
6	R13	Fuji Speedway	(Japan) Kazuhisa Urabe	(Japan) Yuki Sano	(Japan) Yuki Sano	(Japan) TGR-DC Racing School	(Japan) Masayuki Ueda
6	R14	Fuji Speedway	(Japan) Yuki Sano	(Japan) Yuki Sano	(Japan) Yuki Sano	(Japan) TGR-DC Racing School	(Japan) Yorikatsu Tsujiko

== Season report ==
=== First half ===
The 2024 season began at Suzuka with 13 cars, the highest number in three years, and Bionic Jack’s Kizuku Hirota, BRP's Michael Sauter and Sutekina’s Jiei Okuzumi shared pole positions. The first race saw multiple drivers get caught out by slippery track conditions, with poleman Hirota among them as he spun and rejoined in seventh. This saw Okuzumi inherit the lead and he held on through multiple safety car interruptions to win ahead of TOM'S’s Yoshiaki Nakamura and Bionic Jack's Jesse Lacey. Conditions were better in race two, and Sauter converted his pole position into a win by eleven seconds over Okuzumi and Hirota. The final race began with the BRP teammates Sauter and Sebastian Manson fighting over second, with the latter initially taking the place before Sauter took it back. A safety car restart with three laps to go then allowed Sauter to close up to leader Okuzumi to overtake him and win the race. Still, with Sauter not finishing the first race, Okuzumi led the championship by eleven points after the first triple-header.

Eight cars turned up at Sugo, where Sutekina's debutant Fuma Horio and Manson took the pole positions. Horio had a bad start to the first race, but managed to keep ahead of Sauter and soon started building a gap. This gap grew to twelve seconds across the uninterrupted race, with Lacey coming home third, a further five seconds back. Race two saw Horio continue his strong pace. He took the lead from Manson right at the start, but this time was unable to build a similar gap. Manson kept close to him, but was unable to muster an attack on the lead. Sauter had a quiet race to take another podium in third. With championship leader Okuzumi not entering the round, Sauter took the championship lead by 22 points, while Horio's double win saw him end his debut weekend fourth in the standings.

Round three at Okayama saw Sauter dominate qualifying to take all three pole positions. He initially lost out to Lacey at the start of race one, before the Australian spun on a safety car restart. Nakamura took over first place, but Sauter kept close to him and made a move on him on lap eleven, taking the lead and winning the race. Horio took third, before clutch issues forced him to miss the second race. That encounter was held in wet conditions, with Sauter able to build a gap and finish first as Lacey and Nakamura fought behind him. A jump-start penalty for Sauter then saw him demoted to second. Manson made a late move on Nakamura, forcing the Japanese into retirement. He was handed a 30-second penalty, but still came third as every other driver was a lap down. Race three saw Sauter again lose the lead to Lacey at the start, but he fought back to reclaim it. Lacey was then also handed a jump-start penalty, which saw him drop to fourth behind Manson and PONOS’s Yorikatsu Tsujiko. Sauter now had a 53-point lead over Manson.

=== Second half ===
The second half of the season began at Motegi with Manson taking pole position for the first race. He held his lead all race, while Sauter behind him first dropped behind Horio before taking second place back on the penultimate lap. Manson then ran off track in the final corner, handing Sauter the lead and the win, before rejoining unsafely, leading to Horio heavily crashing into him after the finish line. Manson was handed a penalty that dropped him to sixth, elevating Lacey onto the podium. Race two was a smoother affair, with Sauter taking pole position by over half a second before leading every lap and winning by 14 seconds. Manson in second was kept in check by Horio and others, but no one managed to pass him. His double win saw Sauter leave Motegi with a 77-point cushion to his nearest rival.

The championship culminated in two rounds at Fuji Speedway, where the TGR-DC Racing School entered two Toyota juniors in Yuki Sano and Kazuhisa Urabe. They were immediately on pace, with Sano taking both pole positions. He dropped to third at the start of race one, behind Urabe and Sauter, before that pair then collided and Urabe retired. Sano, back in the lead, then went on to win ahead of HELM’s Anna Inotsume and Manson. Sauter was penalised and dropped to sixth, unable to clinch his championship. Race two saw Urabe again get by Sano, but it took only three corners before he was back in front. Nakamura then also got by Urabe to take second. Sauter had to retire with a clutch problem, but with Manson stuck in the midfield, the Swiss was crowned champion in the pits.

Urabe and Sano were fastest again in qualifying for the final two races and took a pole position each. The former was immediately jumped by the latter at the start of the first race, and Sano controlled the race from that point on to win by five seconds. Urabe came second in a largely uneventful race, with DELiGHTWORKS Racing's Yugo Iwasawa completing the podium on his return to the series. With Sano starting the second race from pole position, he did not have to overtake anyone and ended his four-race season with a fourth win that saw him take fifth place in the standings. Urabe took second again, unchallenged as Sauter in third had to fend off Iwasawa all race long. Manson finished his season with two eighth places, thereby claiming the runner-up spot in the championship.

Sauter won six races and took four further podiums on his way to becoming FRJ's first foreign champion. While he was dominant over some weekends, part-time drivers often came in and stole the show, like Horio at Sugo or Sano at the final four races, so the championship might have looked very different had these drivers done a full campaign. Away from the championship fight, FRJ supported Super Formula for the first time in its history, and was rewarded with its highest entry numbers in years at the start and the end of the season. Still entry numbers dropped to only eight drivers mid-season, with Formula Regional Japan (run to the FIA standard) and Super Formula Lights (aligned with the pre-2018 specification and Euroformula Open Championship) continuing to fight for supremacy in Japan's second tier of formula racing.

== Championship standings ==
=== Scoring system ===
Points were awarded to the top ten drivers.

Position	**1st**	**2nd**	**3rd**	**4th**	**5th**	**6th**	**7th**	**8th**	**9th**	**10th**
Points	25	18	15	12	10	8	6	4	2	1

=== Drivers' championship ===
Pos	Driver	SUZ			SUG		OKA			MOT		FUJ1		FUJ2		Pts
Pos	Driver	R1	R2	R3	R4	R5	R6	R7	R8	R9	R10	R11	R12	R13	R14	Pts
1	(Switzerland) Michael Sauter	Ret	**1**	1	2	3	**1**	**2**	**1**	1	**1**	6	Ret	4	3	236
2	(New Zealand) Sebastian Manson	Ret	5	3	5	**2**	4	3	2	**6**	2	3	6	8	8	155
3	(Japan) Yoshiaki Nakamura	2	6	8	8†	5	2	4	DNS	4	4	4	2	5	6	146
4	(Australia) Jesse Lacey	3	7	Ret	3	6	6	1	4	3	6	8	4	7	7	140
5	(Japan) Yuki Sano											**1**	**1**	1	**1**	100
6	(Japan) Fuma Horio				**1**	1	3	DNS	Ret	2	3					98
7	(Japan) Anna Inotsume	6	Ret	6	6	7	5	6	5	Ret	5	2	5	10	10	98
8	(Japan) Jiei Okuzumi	1	2	**2**												61
9	(Japan) Kazuhisa Urabe											Ret	3	**2**	2	51
10	(Japan) "Yugo”	10	11	9	7	8	7	7	6	7	8	11	11	14	14	43
11	(Japan) Yorikatsu Tsujiko	7	9	7			Ret	5	3			Ret	DNS	12	11	39
12	(Japan) "Akita"	8	4	11								5	7			32
13	(Japan) Yugo Iwasawa													3	4	27
14	(Japan) "Motoki"	4	8	5												26
15	(Japan) Kizuku Hirota	**5**	3	12												25
16	(United Kingdom) Alfie Briggs				4	4										24
17	(Japan) "Yuki"									5	7	9	10	13	13	19
18	(China) Wang Zhongwei	9	12	4										9	9	18
19	(Japan) Yuta Fujiwara													6	5	18
20	(Japan) Masayuki Ueda											7	9	11	12	8
21	(Japan) Tadakazu Kojima											10	8			5
22	(Philippines) Juancho Brobio	Ret	10	10												2
Pos	Driver	R1	R2	R3	R4	R5	R6	R7	R8	R9	R10	R11	R12	R13	R14	Pts
Pos	Driver	SUZ			SUG		OKA			MOT		FUJ1		FUJ2		Pts

=== Masters' class standings ===
Pos	Driver	SUZ			SUG		OKA			MOT		FUJ1		FUJ2		Pts
Pos	Driver	R1	R2	R3	R4	R5	R6	R7	R8	R9	R10	R11	R12	R13	R14	Pts
1	(Japan) "Yugo”	4	4	3	**1**	**1**	1	2	2	2	2	5	5	4	4	230
2	(Japan) Yorikatsu Tsujiko	2	3	2			**Ret**	**1**	**1**			Ret	DNS	**2**	**1**	144
3	(Japan) "Yuki"									**1**	**1**	3	4	3	3	107
4	(Japan) "Akita"	**3**	**1**	**4**								**1**	1			102
5	(Japan) Masayuki Ueda											2	3	1	2	76
6	(Japan) "Motoki"	1	2	1												68
7	(Japan) Tadakazu Kojima											4	**2**			30
Pos	Driver	R1	R2	R3	R4	R5	R6	R7	R8	R9	R10	R11	R12	R13	R14	Pts
Pos	Driver	SUZ			SUG		OKA			MOT		FUJ1		FUJ2		Pts

Colour	Result
Gold	Winner
Silver	Second place
Bronze	Third place
Green	Points classification
Blue	Non-points classification
Blue	Non-classified finish (NC)
Purple	Retired, not classified (Ret)
Red	Did not qualify (DNQ)
Red	Did not pre-qualify (DNPQ)
Black	Disqualified (DSQ)
White	Did not start (DNS)
White	Withdrew (WD)
White	Race cancelled (C)
Blank	Did not practice (DNP)
Blank	Did not arrive (DNA)
Blank	Excluded (EX)

**Bold** – Pole

Italics – Fastest Lap

=== Teams' championship ===
Only the best finishing driver of each team was eligible for teams' championship points.

Pos	Driver	SUZ			SUG		OKA			MOT		FUJ1		FUJ2		Pts
Pos	Driver	R1	R2	R3	R4	R5	R6	R7	R8	R9	R10	R11	R12	R13	R14	Pts
1	(Japan) Birth Racing Project【BRP】	Ret	1	1	2	2	1	2	1	1	1	3	6	4	3	254
2	(Japan) Sutekina Racing Team	1	2	2	1	1	3	DNS	Ret	2	3					159
3	(Japan) Bionic Jack Racing	3	3	12	3	4	6	1	4	3	6	8	4	7	7	153
4	(Japan) TOM'S Formula	2	6	8	8†	5	2	4	DNS	4	4	4	2	4	6	146
5	(Japan) TGR-DC Racing School											1	1	1	1	100
6	(Japan) HELM Motorsports	6	Ret	6	6	7	5	6	5	Ret	5	2	5	10	10	98
7	(Japan) Rn-sports	4	8	5								7	9	6	5	52
8	(Japan) N-SPEED	10	11	9	7	8	7	7	6	7	8	11	11	14	14	43
9	(Japan) PONOS Racing	7	9	7			Ret	5	3			Ret	DNS	12	11	39
10	(Japan) Abbey Racing	8	4	11								5	7			32
11	(Japan) Delightworks Racing													3	4	27
12	(Japan) NILZZ Racing									5	7	9	10	13	13	19
13	(China) Sky Motorsports	9	12	4										9	9	18
14	(Japan) Eagle Sports	Ret	10	10								10	8			7
Pos	Driver	R1	R2	R3	R4	R5	R6	R7	R8	R9	R10	R11	R12	R13	R14	Pts
Pos	Driver	SUZ			SUG		OKA			MOT		FUJ1		FUJ2		Pts
