= Michael Sauter =

Swiss racing driver (born 2004)

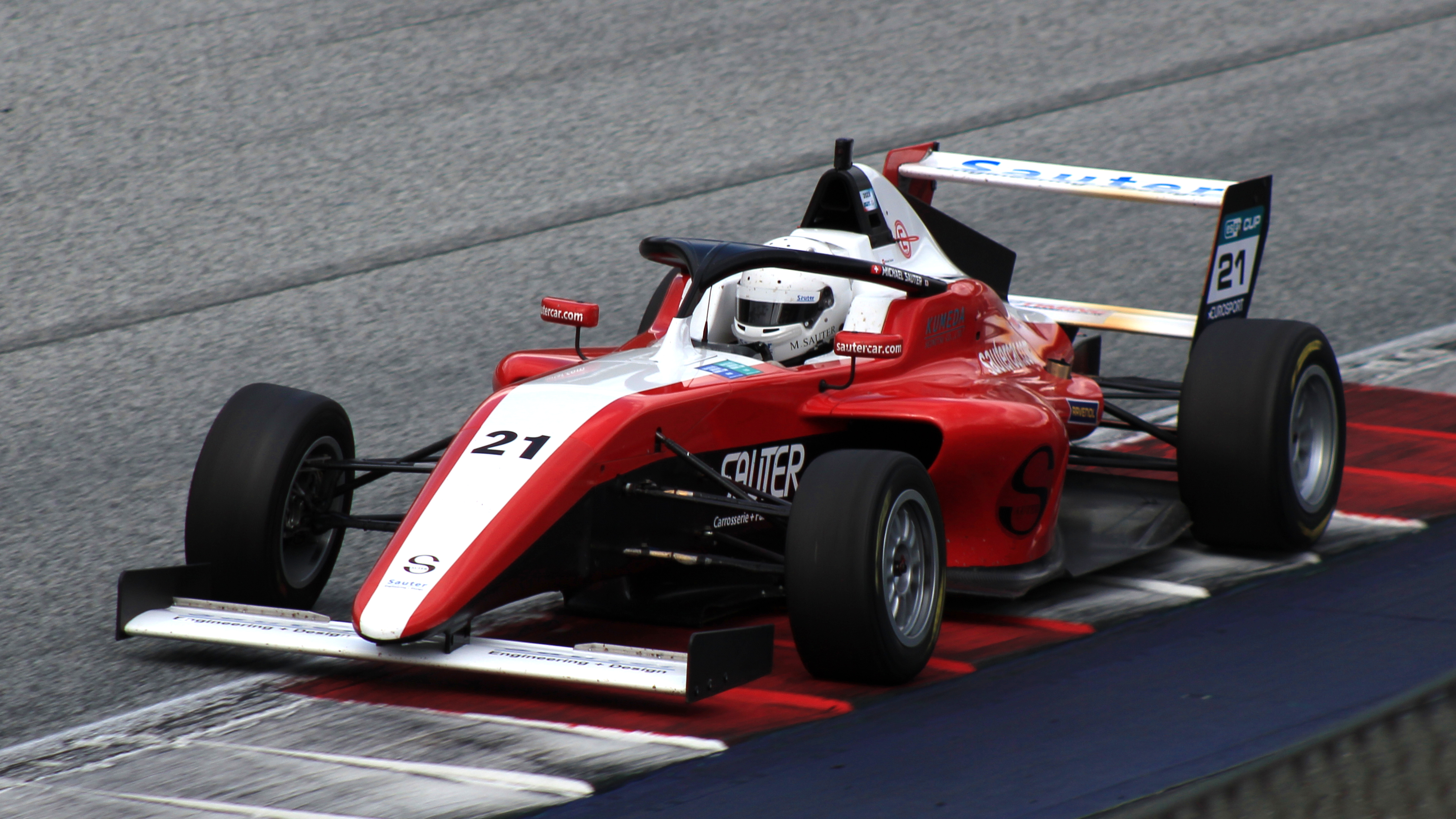
- Sauter in 2023
- Nationality: (Switzerland) Swiss (Germany) German via double nationality
- Born: 5 October 2004 (age 22) Gempen, Switzerland

Previous series
- 2023-2024 2023 2021-2022: FR Japanese Championship; Formula 4 CEZ Championship; ADAC F4 Championship

Championship titles
- 2024: FR Japanese Championship

Michael Sauter (born 5 October 2004) is a German-Swiss racing driver of Japanese descent. He became the 2024 champion of the Formula Regional Japanese Championship.

== Career ==
=== Karting ===
Coming from a family with a racing background, Sauter started karting at the age of seven and began to compete in the Swiss Championship in 2013. He raced in go-karts until the end of 2020, winning the Vega Trofeo in 2014 and 2016 respectively, missing out on the chance of the 2015 title due to a ski accident.

=== Lower formulae ===
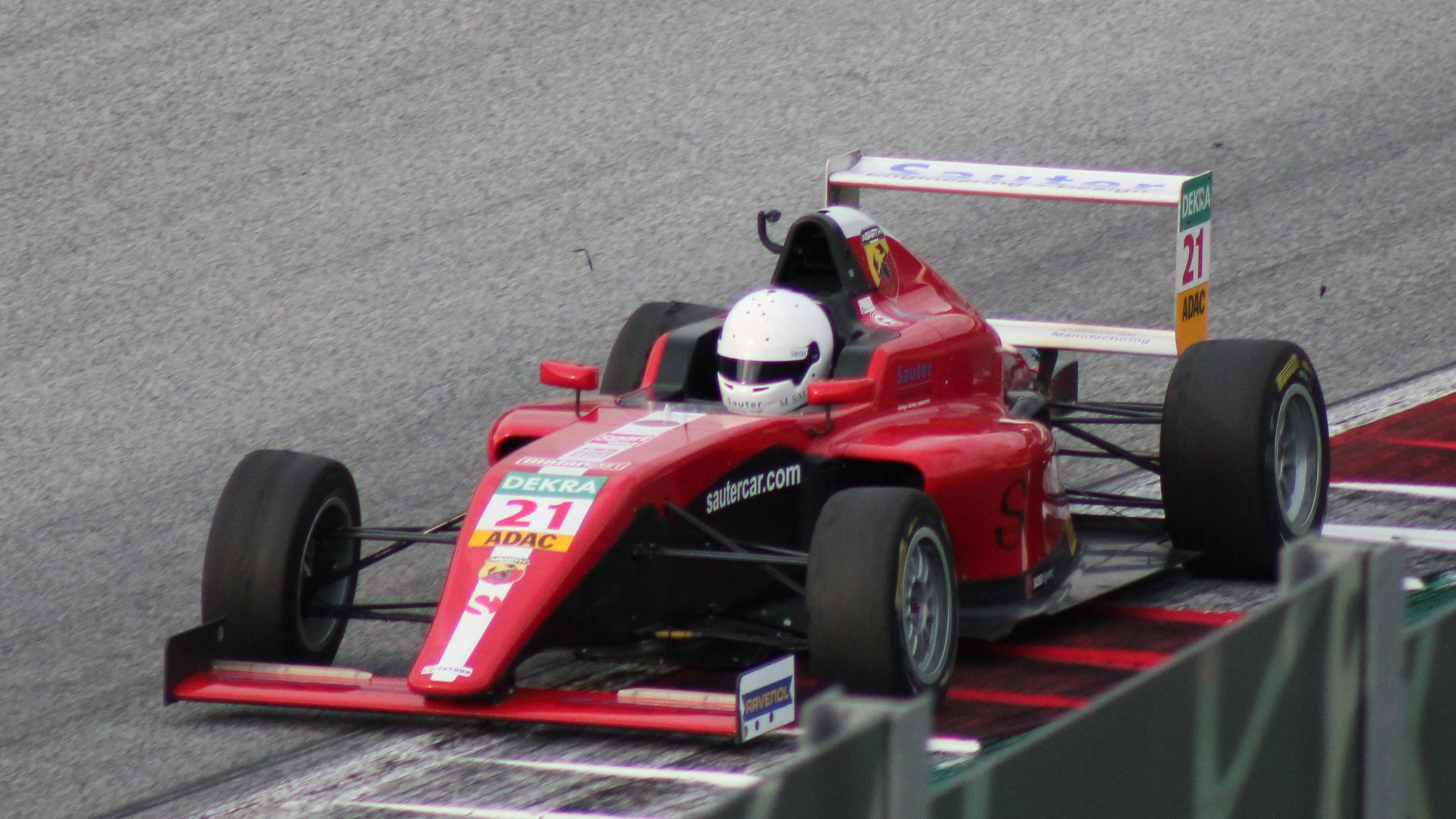
Sauter racing in the 2021 ADAC Formula 4 Championship at the Red Bull Ring

In 2021, after some Formula 4 testing at Anneau du Rhin, Sauter made his car racing debut, competing in a family effort with the Sauter Engineering + Design team, named after his father's company, in the ADAC Formula 4 Championship. In the final race of the second round at Circuit Zandvoort, Sauter scored his only rookie win of the season. He scored his first point in round three at the Hockenheimring, however a crash in qualifying at the next event at the Sachsenring meant extensive damage to his car, which could only be repaired in time for the second race with the help of other teams' mechanics. In the final race of the event, he went on to take his best finish of the season in fifth. Sauter became vice-champion in the rookie classification.

In 2022, Sauter remained in the ADAC Formula 4 Championship. He finished the championship in thirteenth overall.

In 2023, Sauter moved to the Formula 4 CEZ Championship after the ADAC Formula 4 had folded. He took his first and only race win in the final round at the newly opened Balaton Park Circuit. He also finished third overall in the championship.

=== Formula Regional Japanese Championship ===
In 2023, Sauter also competed in two rounds of the Formula Regional Japanese Championship with Sutekina Racing Team and Bionic Jack Racing. In the final round at Sportsland Sugo, where he competed with Bionic Jack Racing, he took his first victory in the championship, having started from pole in the final race.

After joining the G Force Driver Development Program, Sauter returned to the Formula Regional Japanese Championship in 2024, driving for Birth Racing Project. Sauter won the championship, having claimed six race victories and four further podiums during the season.

== Karting record ==
=== Karting career summary ===
Season	Series	Team	Position
2013	Schweizer Kart Meisterschaft — Mini	Sauter Team	4th
2014	Vega Trofeo — Super Mini		1st
2014	Schweizer Kart Meisterschaft — Super Mini		15th
2015	Vega Trofeo — Super Mini		9th
2016	Vega Trofeo — Super Mini		1st
2016	Schweizer Kart Meisterschaft — Super Mini		7th
2017	Vega Trofeo — Super Mini		2nd
2017	Schweizer Kart Meisterschaft — Super Mini		2nd
2017	IAME International Final — X30 Mini		5th
2018	Vega Trofeo — Junior		4th
2018	Schweizer Kart Meisterschaft — X30 Junior		4th
2018	IAME International Final — X30 Junior		101st
2019	Schweizer Kart Meisterschaft — X30 Challenge		7th
2019	IAME International Final — X30 Senior		131st

== Racing record ==
=== Racing career summary ===
Season	Series	Team	Races	Wins	Poles	F/Laps	Podiums	Points	Position
2021	ADAC Formula 4 Championship	Sauter Engineering + Design	17	0	0	0	0	19	15th
2022	ADAC Formula 4 Championship	Sauter Engineering + Design	18	0	0	0	0	41	13th
2023	Formula 4 CEZ Championship	Sauter Engineering + Design	14	1	1	5	9	204	**3rd**
2023	Formula Regional Japanese Championship	Sutekina Racing Team	3	0	0	0	0	71	6th
2023	Formula Regional Japanese Championship	Bionic Jack Racing	3	1	2	2	1	71	6th
2024	Formula Regional Japanese Championship	Birth Racing Project【BRP】	14	6	5	8	10	236	**1st**

* Season still in progress.

=== Complete ADAC Formula 4 Championship results ===
(key) (Races in bold indicate pole position) (Races in italics indicate fastest lap)

Year	Team	1	2	3	4	5	6	7	8	9	10	11	12	13	14	15	16	17	18	Pos	Points
2021	Sauter Engineering + Design	RBR; 1; 17	RBR; 2; 19	RBR; 3 Ret	ZAN; 1; 20	ZAN; 2; 19	ZAN; 3; 12	HOC1; 1; 10	HOC1; 2; 13	HOC1; 3; 11	SAC; 1 DNS	SAC; 2; 9	SAC; 3; 5	HOC2; 1; 8	HOC2; 2; 10	HOC2; 3; 12	NÜR; 1; 13	NÜR; 2; 10	NÜR; 3; 13	15th	19
2022	Sauter Engineering + Design	SPA; 1; 14	SPA; 2; 11	SPA; 3; 16	HOC; 1; 11	HOC; 2; 18	HOC; 3; 13	ZAN; 1; 13	ZAN; 2; 13	ZAN; 3 Ret	NÜR1; 1; 12	NÜR1; 2; 11	NÜR1; 3; 10	LAU; 1; 5	LAU; 2 Ret	LAU; 3; 9	NÜR2; 1; 6	NÜR2; 2 Ret	NÜR2; 3; 9	13th	41

=== Complete Formula 4 CEZ Championship results ===
(key) (Races in bold indicate pole position; races in italics indicate fastest lap)

Year	Team	1	2	3	4	5	6	7	8	9	10	11	12	13	14	DC	Points
2023	Sauter Engineering + Design	HUN; 1; 2	HUN; 2; 6	RBR; 1; 4	RBR; 2 Ret	**SVK**; **1**; 2	SVK; 2; 2	MOS; 1; 4	MOS; 2; 3	MOS; 3; 4	BRN; 1; 3	BRN; 2; 3	BAL; 1; 2	BAL; 2; 1	BAL; 3; 2	3rd	204

=== Complete Formula Regional Japanese Championship results ===
(key) (Races in bold indicate pole position) (Races in italics indicate fastest lap)

Year	Entrant	1	2	3	4	5	6	7	8	9	10	11	12	13	14	15	16	Pos	Points
2023	Sutekina Racing Team	FUJ1; 1	FUJ1; 2	FUJ1; 3	SUZ; 1	SUZ; 2	OKA; 1	OKA; 2	OKA; 3	MOT; 1; 4	MOT; 2; 5	MOT; 3; 4	FUJ2; 1	FUJ2; 2				6th	71
2023	Bionic Jack Racing														SUG; 1; 4	**SUG**; **2** Ret	**SUG**; **3**; 1	6th	71
2024	Birth Racing Project 【BRP】	SUZ; 1 Ret	**SUZ**; **2**; 1	SUZ; 3; 1	SUG; 1; 2	SUG; 2; 3	**OKA**; **1**; 1	**OKA**; **2**; 2	**OKA**; **3**; 1	MOT; 1; 1	**MOT**; **2**; 1	FUJ1; 1; 6	FUJ1; 2 Ret	FUJ2; 1; 4	FUJ2; 2; 3			1st	236
