= Yuki Sano =

Japanese racing driver

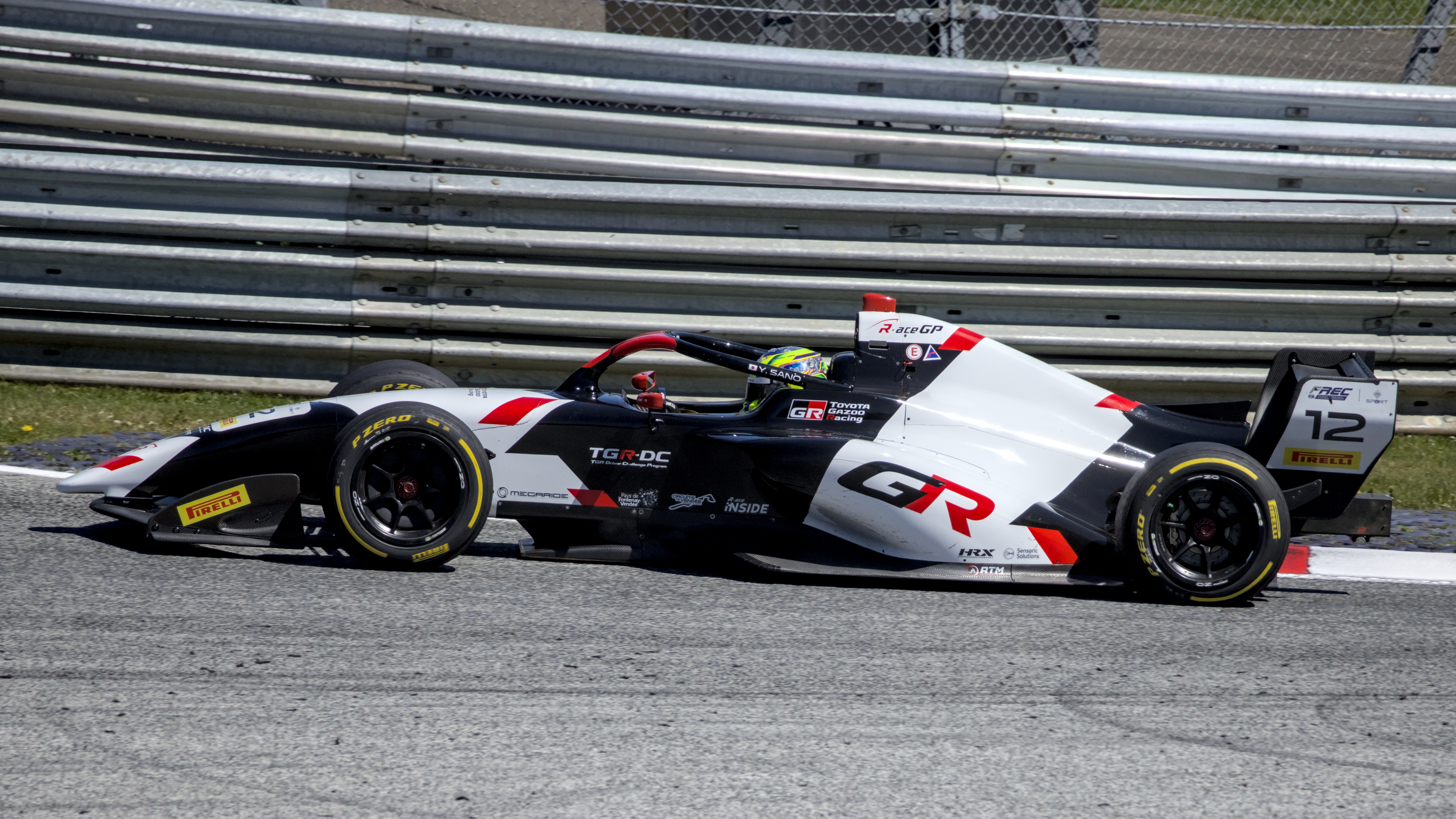
- Sano in 2026
- Nationality: (Japan) Japanese
- Born: 12 December 2006 (age 19) Shizuoka, Japan

Formula Regional European Championship career
- Debut season: 2026
- Current team: R-ace GP
- Car number: 12
- Starts: 19
- Wins: 1
- Podiums: 2
- Poles: 1
- Fastest laps: 1

Previous series
- 2026 2025 2025 2025 2024 2023–2024: FR Middle East; Super GT; Super Taikyu Series; Super Formula Lights; FR Japanese; F4 Japanese
- Statistics up to date as of 18 September 2026.

Yuki Sano (佐野 雄城, Sano Yūki; born 12 December 2006) is a Japanese racing driver who last competed in the Formula Regional European Championship with R-ace GP as part of the TGR Driver Challenge program.

Sano previously raced in Super Formula Lights, finishing runner-up in 2025.

== Career ==
=== Formula 4 ===
Sano started his Formula 4 career in 2023 with TGR-DC Racing School. He achieved two podiums in his rookie season, ending the year seventh in the standings. Sano remained in the championship for 2024, taking his first win in Formula 4 in the opening round of the season.

=== Formula Regional Japanese Championship ===
At the end of 2024, Sano would compete in Formula Regional Japanese Championship with TGR-DC Racing School for the last two rounds at Fuji Speedway alongside Kazuhisa Urabe.

=== Super Formula Lights ===
Sano competed in the Super Formula Lights with TOM'S for 2025. He finished second in the final standings.

=== Super GT ===
In 2025, Sano would make his Super GT GT300 debut campaign with SHADE Racing.

=== Formula Regional ===
Following his Super Formula Lights season, Sano joined R-ace GP in the newly reformed FREC in 2026. He also signed for the 2026 Formula Regional Middle East Trophy with the same team. Later that year, he raced in the Macau Grand Prix with TOM'S.

== Racing record ==
=== Career summary ===
Season	Series	Team	Races	Wins	Poles	FLaps	Podiums	Points	Position
2023	F4 Japanese Championship	TGR-DC Racing School	14	0	0	0	2	74	7th
2024	F4 Japanese Championship	TGR-DC Racing School	13	3	2	1	7	147	4th
2024	Formula Regional Japanese Championship	TGR-DC Racing School	4	4	3	3	4	100	5th
2025	Super Formula Lights	TOM'S	18	4	2	5	12	104	**2nd**
2025	Super Taikyu - ST-Z	SHADE Racing	5	0	2	0	2	84.5‡	**2nd‡**
2025	Super GT - GT300	SHADE Racing	1	0	0	0	0	0	NC
2025	Macau Grand Prix	TOM'S Formula	1	0	0	0	0	—N/a	9th
2026	Formula Regional Middle East Trophy	R-ace GP	10	0	0	0	0	37	13th
2026	Formula Regional European Championship	R-ace GP	19	1	1	1	2	67	9th
2026	Macau Grand Prix	TOM'S Racing	0	0	0	0	0	—N/a	TBD

^{*} Season still in progress.
‡ Team standings

=== Complete F4 Japanese Championship results ===
(key) (Races in bold indicate pole position) (Races in italics indicate fastest lap)

Year	Team	1	2	3	4	5	6	7	8	9	10	11	12	13	14	15	DC	Pts
2023	TGR-DC Racing School	FUJ1; 1; 3	FUJ1; 2; 9	SUZ; 1; 8	SUZ; 2; 11	FUJ2; 1 Ret	FUJ2; 2; 5	SUZ2; 1; 6	SUZ2; 2 Ret	SUG; 1; 3	SUG; 2; 5	AUT; 1; 5	AUT; 2; 40	MOT; 1 Ret	MOT; 2; 37		7th	74
2024	TGR-DC Racing School	FUJ1; 1; 1	FUJ1; 2 DNS	SUZ; 1; 11	SUZ; 2; 6	FUJ2; 1; 10	FUJ2; 2; 7	**SUG**; **1**; 1	**SUG**; **2**; 1	AUT; 1 C	AUT; 2; 2	MOT; 1; 3	MOT; 2; 7	MOT; 3; 3	SUZ2; 1; 2	SUZ2; 2; 5	4th	147

=== Complete Formula Regional Japanese Championship results ===
(key) (Races in bold indicate pole position) (Races in italics indicate fastest lap)

Year	Entrant	1	2	3	4	5	6	7	8	9	10	11	12	13	14	Pos	Points
2024	TGR-DC Racing School	SUZ; 1	SUZ; 2	SUZ; 3	SUG; 1	SUG; 2	OKA; 1	OKA; 2	OKA; 3	MOT; 1	MOT; 2	**FUJ1**; **1**; 1	**FUJ1**; **2**; 1	FUJ2; 1; 1	**FUJ2**; **2**; 1	5th	100

=== Complete Super Formula Lights results ===
(key) (Races in bold indicate pole position) (Races in italics indicate fastest lap)

Year	Entrant	1	2	3	4	5	6	7	8	9	10	11	12	13	14	15	16	17	18	Pos	Points
2025	TOM'S	**SUZ**; **1**; 1	**SUZ**; **2**; 1	SUZ; 3; 1	AUT; 1; 1	AUT; 2; 2	OKA; 1; 5	OKA; 2; 5	OKA; 3; 7	SUG; 1; 2	SUG; 2; 2	SUG; 3; 2	SUG; 4; 2	FUJ; 1; 5	FUJ; 2; 4	FUJ; 3; 4	MOT; 1; 3	MOT; 2; 3	MOT; 3; 3	2nd	104

=== Complete Super GT results ===
(key) (Races in bold indicate pole position) (Races in italics indicate fastest lap)

Year	Team	Car	Class	1	2	3	4	5	6	7	8	9	DC	Pts
2025	SHADE Racing	Toyota GR86 GT300	GT300	OKA	FUJ; 17	SEP	FS1	FS2	SUZ	SUG	AUT	MOT	NC	0

=== Complete Macau Grand Prix results ===
Year	Team	Car	Qualifying	Quali Race	Main Race
2025	(Japan) TOM'S Formula	Tatuus F3 T-318	19th	18th	9th
2026	(Japan) TOM'S Racing	Tatuus T-326	TBD	TBD	TBD

=== Complete Formula Regional Middle East Trophy results ===
(key) (Races in bold indicate pole position) (Races in italics indicate fastest lap)

Year	Entrant	1	2	3	4	5	6	7	8	9	10	11	12	DC	Points
2026	R-ace GP	YMC1; 1; 24	YMC1; 2; 13	YMC1; 3; 10	YMC2; 1; 4	YMC2; 2; 8	YMC2; 3; 7	DUB; 1; 6	DUB; 2 Ret	DUB; 3 DNS	LUS; 1; 8	LUS; 2 C	LUS; 3; 9	13th	37

=== Complete Formula Regional European Championship results ===
(key) (Races in bold indicate pole position) (Races in italics indicate fastest lap)

Year	Team	1	2	3	4	5	6	7	8	9	10	11	12	13	14	15	16	17	18	19	20	DC	Points
2026	R-ace GP	RBR; 1; 10	RBR; 2; 12	RBR; 3 Ret	ZAN; 1; 17	ZAN; 2; 16	SPA; 1; 4	SPA; 2 C	SPA; 3; 16	MNZ; 1 Ret	MNZ; 2; 22	MNZ; 3; 3	**HUN**; **1**; 1	HUN; 2; 18	LEC; 1; 11	LEC; 2; 17	IMO; 1; 17	IMO; 2 Ret	IMO; 3 Ret	HOC; 1; 14	HOC; 2; 4	9th	67
