= Nandhavud Bhirombhakdi =

Thai racing driver (born 2006)

- นันทวุฒิ ภิรมย์ภักดี
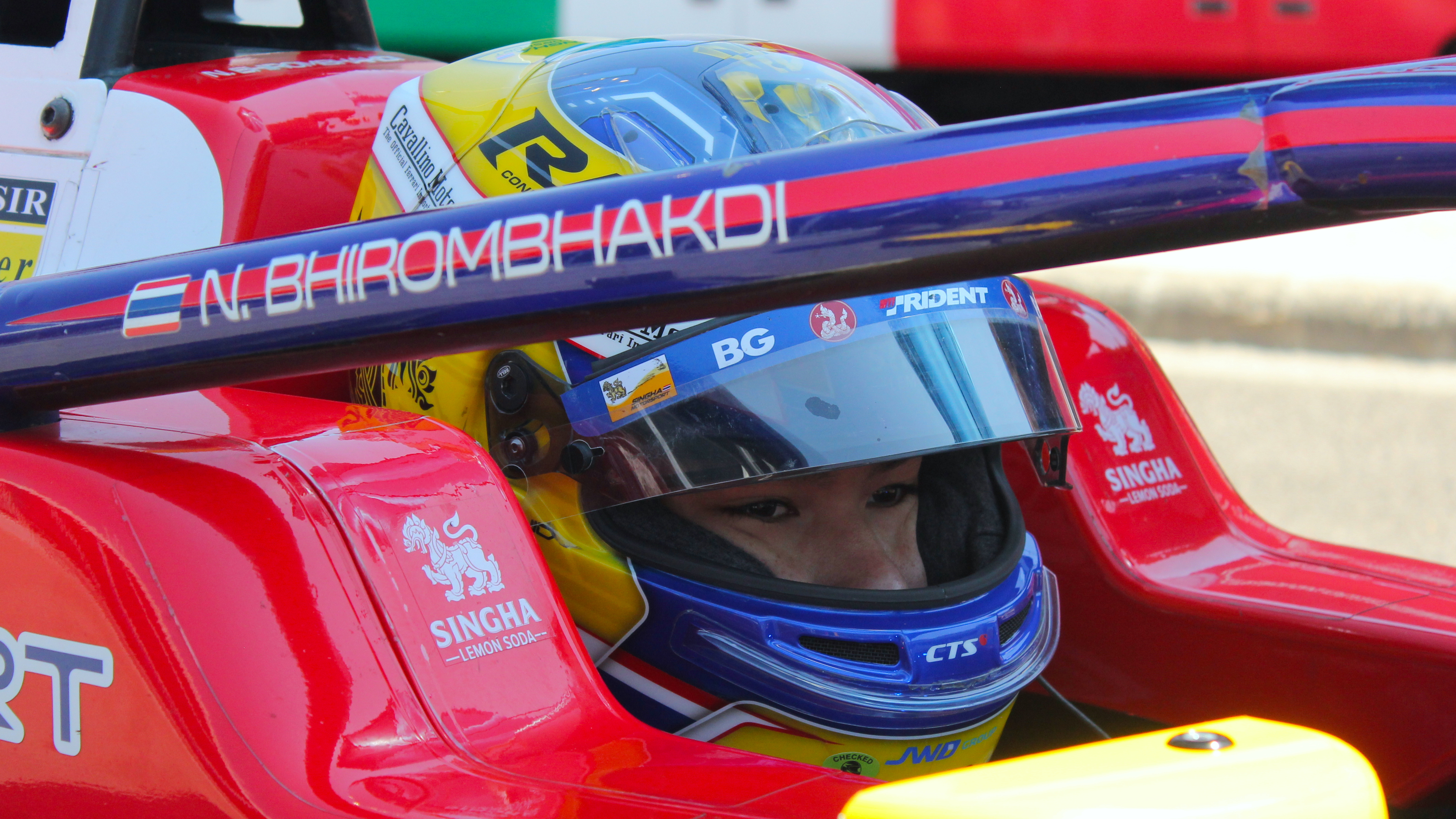
- Bhirombhakdi in 2025
- Born: 7 June 2006 (age 20); Bangkok, Thailand
- Family: Bhirombhakdi family
- Nationality: (Thailand) Thai

FIA Formula 3 Championship career
- Debut season: 2026
- Current team: DAMS Lucas Oil
- Car number: 30
- Starts: 18 (19 entries)
- Wins: 0
- Podiums: 0
- Poles: 0
- Fastest laps: 0
- Best finish: 30th in 2026

Previous series
- 2024–2025; 2023; 2023; 2022–2023; 2022–2023; 2022: FR European; Euro 4; F4 CEZ; Italian F4; F4 UAE; ADAC F4
- Statistics up to date as of 15 September 2026.

Nandhavud "Jem" Bhirombhakdi (Thai: นันทวุฒิ ภิรมย์ภักดี (เจม); born 7 June 2006) is a Thai racing driver who last competed in the 2026 FIA Formula 3 Championship for DAMS Lucas Oil.

Born in Bangkok to the Bhirombhakdi family, known for founding and owning Boon Rawd Brewery, Bhirombhakdi began competitive kart racing aged 12. After two seasons in Formula 4 from 2022 to 2023—contesting the UAE, ADAC, Italian, CEZ, and Euro 4 Championships—he progressed to Formula Regional European in 2024.

== Family ==
Bhirombhakdi is a son of Voravud and Nandhamalee Bhirombhakdi. His father, a fourth-generation member of the Bhirombhakdi family, is an executive in the family's Boon Rawd Brewery group and racing driver. His mother, a granddaughter of Prince Chakraband Pensiri, heads Cavallino Motors, the sole distributor of Ferrari in Thailand.

Bhirombhakdi was introduced to driving simulators around the age of six by his father.

== Career ==
=== Karting ===
Bhirombhakdi began his motorsport career in karting at a young age, competing in both national and international championships across Asia and Europe. During his karting years, he participated in several prestigious events, including the Rok Cup Asia, IAME Series Asia, WSK Open Cup, WSK Super Master Series, South Garda Winter Cup, and ROK Cup Superfinal.

Bhirombhakdi enjoyed considerable success in Thailand's national karting scene, becoming one of the few drivers to win championship titles across all major categories. He claimed Thai national championships in the Mini ROK, Junior Open, and Senior Open classes. In addition to his domestic achievements, he also secured multiple race victories in regional Asian competitions, including rounds held in Malaysia and Indonesia, demonstrating his ability to consistently perform and progress through every stage of karting competition.

Alongside his domestic success, Bhirombhakdi gained valuable international experience by competing against some of the world's top junior drivers in Europe and Asia. This exposure helped prepare him for the transition to single-seater racing, where he progressed through Formula 4, the Formula Regional European Championship, and FIA Formula 3.

=== Formula 4 ===
==== 2022 ====
Bhirombhakdi made his Formula 4 debut in the 2022 Formula 4 UAE Championship, driving for UAE-based squad Xcel Motorsport. His season there saw him have a best race result of 15th, as he finished 34th in the standings, failing to score a point. Bhirombhakdi's main campaign was the 2022 ADAC Formula 4 Championship season. Driving for Jenzer Motorsport, Bhirombhakdi had much more success. He secured a best result of sixth at the Lausitzring, as he finished 14th in the standings on 38 points. He also appeared in the Italian F4 Championship with Jenzer.

==== 2023 ====
After another disappointing season of preparation in the 2023 Formula 4 UAE Championship, Bhirombhakdi was announced to be joining PHM Racing for the 2023 Italian F4 Championship. He topped a test with the team in pre-season. Bhirombhakdi showed more improvement among a more competitive grid, with two best results of 8th enough to secure him 21st in the championship, despite missing the final round. He also made appearances in the 2023 Formula 4 CEZ Championship, where he made the podium in the first race at the Red Bull Ring, and the 2023 Euro 4 Championship.

=== Formula Regional ===
==== 2024 ====
In early 2024, KIC Motorsport announced that Bhirombhakdi would be driving one of their cars in the upcoming Formula Regional European Championship. He finished 26th in the standings with no points scored, having achieved a best result of 12th.

==== 2025 ====
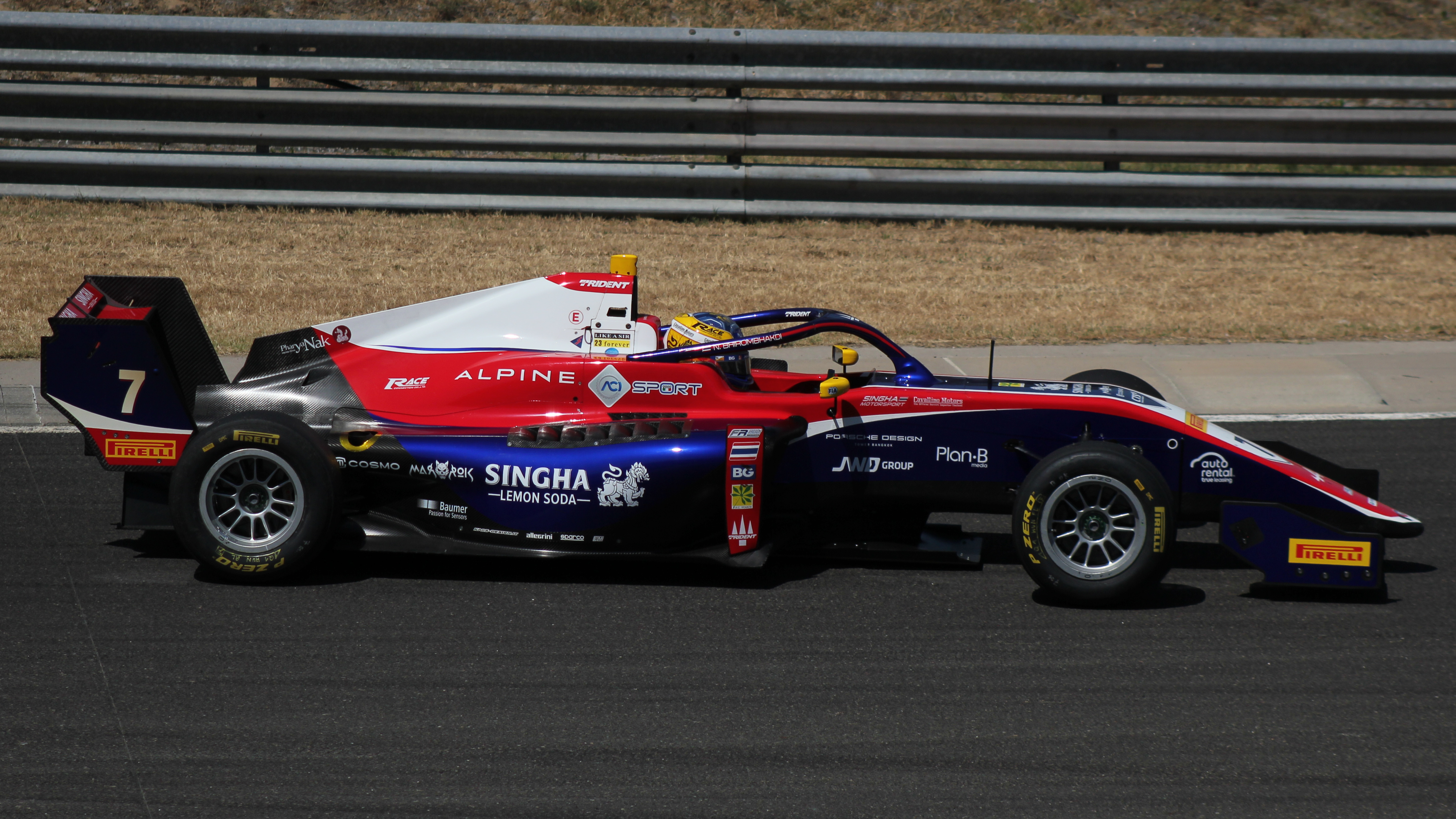
Bhirombhakdi driving at the Hungaroring during the 2025 Formula Regional European Championship

In December, it was announced that Bhirombhakdi would be lining up in the championship with Trident, joining fellow sophomore drivers Liu Ruiqi and Matteo De Palo at the team. He finished 16th in the standings with 24 points.

=== FIA Formula 3 ===
In 2026, Bhirombhakdi moved up to Formula 3 with DAMS Lucas Oil.

== Karting record ==
=== Karting career summary ===
Season	Series	Team	Position
2019	South Garda Winter Cup — Mini ROK	Ward Racing	31st
2019	ROK Cup Superfinal — Mini ROK	Ward Racing	31st
2019	WSK Open Cup — OKJ	Ward Racing	59th
2019	IAME Series Asia – Junior	Singha Motorsports	26th
2020	South Garda Winter Cup — OKJ	Ward Racing	69th
2020	WSK Super Master Series — OKJ	Ward Racing	55th

== Racing record ==
=== Racing career summary ===
Season	Series	Team	Races	Wins	Poles	F/Laps	Podiums	Points	Position
2022	Formula 4 UAE Championship	Xcel Motorsport	20	0	0	0	0	0	34th
2022	ADAC Formula 4 Championship	Jenzer Motorsport	15	0	0	0	0	38	14th
2022	Italian F4 Championship	Jenzer Motorsport	8	0	0	0	0	0	41st
2023	Formula 4 UAE Championship	PHM Racing	6	0	0	0	0	0	31st
2023	Italian F4 Championship	PHM Racing	18	0	0	0	0	8	21st
2023	Formula 4 CEZ Championship	PHM Racing	2	0	0	0	1	24	14th
2023	Euro 4 Championship	PHM Racing	6	0	0	0	0	0	21st
2024	Formula Regional European Championship	KIC Motorsport	20	0	0	0	0	0	26th
2025	Formula Regional European Championship	Trident	20	0	0	0	0	24	16th
2026	FIA Formula 3 Championship	DAMS Lucas Oil	18	0	0	0	0	0	30th

^{*} Season still in progress.

=== Complete Formula 4 UAE Championship results ===
(key) (Races in bold indicate pole position) (Races in italics indicate fastest lap)

Year	Team	1	2	3	4	5	6	7	8	9	10	11	12	13	14	15	16	17	18	19	20	Pos	Points
2022	Xcel Motorsport	YMC1; 1; 20	YMC1; 2; 22	YMC1; 3; 21	YMC1; 4; 17	DUB1; 1; 19	DUB1; 2; 23	DUB1; 3; 20	DUB1; 4; 26	DUB2; 1; 28†	DUB2; 2; 19	DUB2; 3; 24	DUB2; 4 Ret	DUB3; 1 Ret	DUB3; 2; 22	DUB3; 3; 20	DUB3; 4 Ret	YMC2; 1; 18	YMC2; 2; 15	YMC2; 3; 22	YMC2; 4; 16	34th	0
2023	PHM Racing	DUB1; 1	DUB1; 2	DUB1; 3	KMT1; 1	KMT1; 2	KMT1; 3	KMT2; 1	KMT2; 2	KMT2; 3	DUB2; 1; 22	DUB2; 2; 17	DUB2; 3; 34	YMC; 1; 14	YMC; 2; 16	YMC; 3 Ret						31st	0

=== Complete ADAC Formula 4 Championship results ===
(key) (Races in bold indicate pole position) (Races in italics indicate fastest lap)

Year	Team	1	2	3	4	5	6	7	8	9	10	11	12	13	14	15	16	17	18	DC	Points
2022	Jenzer Motorsport	SPA; 1; 15	SPA; 2; 15	SPA; 3; 11	HOC; 1	HOC; 2	HOC; 3	ZAN; 1; 16	ZAN; 2 Ret	ZAN; 3 Ret	NÜR1; 1; 11	NÜR1; 2; 9	NÜR1; 3; 11	LAU; 1; 9	LAU; 2; 7	LAU; 3; 6	NÜR2; 1; 7	NÜR2; 2; 8	NÜR2; 3; 10	14th	38

=== Complete Italian F4 Championship results ===
(key) (Races in bold indicate pole position) (Races in italics indicate fastest lap)

Year	Team	1	2	3	4	5	6	7	8	9	10	11	12	13	14	15	16	17	18	19	20	21	22	DC	Points
2022	Jenzer Motorsport	IMO; 1	IMO; 2	IMO; 3	MIS; 1	MIS; 2	MIS; 3	SPA; 1; 19	SPA; 2; 17	SPA; 3; 26	VLL; 1	VLL; 2	VLL; 3	RBR; 1	RBR; 2	RBR; 3	RBR; 4	MNZ; 1; 15	MNZ; 2; 36†	MNZ; 3 C	MUG; 1 Ret	MUG; 2; 30	MUG; 3; 20	41st	0
2023	PHM Racing	IMO; 1	IMO; 2; 18	IMO; 3; 8	IMO; 4; 29†	MIS; 1; 13	MIS; 2; 16	MIS; 3; 18	SPA; 1; 19	SPA; 2; 25	SPA; 3; 12	MNZ; 1; 12	MNZ; 2; 15	MNZ; 3; 28	LEC; 1; 13	LEC; 2; 8	LEC; 3; 13	MUG; 1 Ret	MUG; 2; 16	MUG; 3 Ret	VLL; 1	VLL; 2	VLL; 3	21st	8

=== Complete Formula 4 CEZ Championship results ===
(key) (Races in bold indicate pole position; races in italics indicate fastest lap)

Year	Team	1	2	3	4	5	6	7	8	9	10	11	12	13	14	DC	Points
2023	PHM Racing	HUN; 1	HUN; 2	RBR; 1; 2	RBR; 2; 7	SVK; 1	SVK; 2	MOS; 1	MOS; 2	MOS; 3	BRN; 1	BRN; 2	BAL; 1	BAL; 2	BAL; 3	14th	24

=== Complete Euro 4 Championship results ===
(key) (Races in bold indicate pole position; races in italics indicate fastest lap)

Year	Team	1	2	3	4	5	6	7	8	9	DC	Points
2023	PHM Racing	MUG; 1; 13	MUG; 2; 19	MUG; 3; 13	MNZ; 1 Ret	MNZ; 2; 20	MNZ; 3; 11	CAT; 1	CAT; 2	CAT; 3	21st	0

=== Complete Formula Regional European Championship results ===
(key) (Races in bold indicate pole position) (Races in italics indicate fastest lap)

Year	Team	1	2	3	4	5	6	7	8	9	10	11	12	13	14	15	16	17	18	19	20	DC	Points
2024	KIC Motorsport	HOC; 1; 27	HOC; 2; 21	SPA; 1; 26	SPA; 2 Ret	ZAN; 1; 26	ZAN; 2; 25	HUN; 1; 25	HUN; 2; 26	MUG; 1; 14	MUG; 2 Ret	LEC; 1 Ret	LEC; 2 Ret	IMO; 1; 12	IMO; 2; 12	RBR; 1 Ret	RBR; 2 Ret	CAT; 1; 23	CAT; 2; 27	MNZ; 1; 12	MNZ; 2; 19	26th	0
2025	Trident	MIS; 1; 12	MIS; 2; 8	SPA; 1; 17	SPA; 2; 17	ZAN; 1; 16	ZAN; 2; 14	HUN; 1; 9	HUN; 2; 11	LEC; 1; 15	LEC; 2; 9	IMO; 1; 16	IMO; 2; 22	RBR; 1; 15	RBR; 2; 9	CAT; 1; 5	CAT; 2; 22	HOC; 1; 16	HOC; 2; 23	MNZ; 1; 8	MNZ; 2; 16	16th	24

=== Complete FIA Formula 3 Championship results ===
(key) (Races in bold indicate pole position) (Races in italics indicate fastest lap)

Year	Entrant	1	2	3	4	5	6	7	8	9	10	11	12	13	14	15	16	17	18	19	DC	Points
2026	DAMS Lucas Oil	MEL; SPR; 29	MEL; FEA; Ret	MON; SPR; 12	MON; FEA; 22	CAT; SPR; 24	CAT; FEA; 25	RBR; SPR; 27	RBR; FEA; 26	SIL; SPR; 25	SIL; FEA; 24	SPA; SPR; 25	SPA; FEA; DNS	HUN; SPR; 25	HUN; FEA; 19	MNZ; SPR; 16	MNZ; FEA; 23	MAD; SPR; 27	MAD; FEA1; 19	MAD; FEA2; 27	30th	0
