= 2022 24H GT Series =

International motorsport

The 2022 24H GT Series powered by Hankook was the eighth season of the 24H Series with drivers battling for championship points and titles and the thirteenth season since Creventic, the organiser and promoter of the series, organised multiple races a year. The races were contested with GT3-spec cars, GT4-spec cars, sports cars and 24H-Specials, like silhouette cars.

== Calendar ==
Race was part of the Middle East Trophy Series

Round	Event	Circuit	Date
1	Dubai 24 Hour	Dubai Autodrome, Dubai Motor City, United Arab Emirates	13–15 January
NC	6 Hours of Abu Dhabi†	Yas Marina Circuit, Yas Island, United Arab Emirates	21–22 January
2	12 Hours of Mugello	Mugello Circuit, Scarperia e San Piero, Italy	25–27 March
3	12 Hours of Spa-Francorchamps	Circuit de Spa-Francorchamps, Stavelot, Belgium	22–24 April
4	12 Hours of Hockenheimring	Hockenheimring, Hockenheim, Germany	13–15 May
5	24 Hours of Portimão	Algarve International Circuit, Portimão, Portugal	8–10 July
6	24 Hours of Barcelona	Circuit de Barcelona-Catalunya, Montmeló, Spain	9–11 September
7	12 Hours of Kuwait	Kuwait Motor Town, Ali Sabah Al Salem, Kuwait	30 November–2 December

† - Non-championship round.

The following events were scheduled to take place but were cancelled.

Event	Circuit	Date
24 Hours of Sebring	Sebring International Raceway, Highlands County, Florida, United States	18–20 November

== Teams and drivers ==
Team	Car	Engine	No.	Drivers	Class	Rounds
GT3
(Canada) ST Racing	BMW M4 GT3	BMW S58B30T0 3.0 L Turbo V8	1	(United States) Bryson Morris	PA	1–2, 6
(Canada) ST Racing	BMW M4 GT3	BMW S58B30T0 3.0 L Turbo V8	1	(Canada) Samantha Tan	PA	1–2, 6
(Canada) ST Racing	BMW M4 GT3	BMW S58B30T0 3.0 L Turbo V8	1	(United States) Harry Gottsacker	PA	1
(Canada) ST Racing	BMW M4 GT3	BMW S58B30T0 3.0 L Turbo V8	1	(United States) Anthony Lazzaro	PA	1
(Canada) ST Racing	BMW M4 GT3	BMW S58B30T0 3.0 L Turbo V8	1	(United States) Tyler Maxson	PA	1
(Canada) ST Racing	BMW M4 GT3	BMW S58B30T0 3.0 L Turbo V8	1	(Canada) Nick Wittmer	PA	2, 6
(Canada) ST Racing	BMW M4 GT3	BMW S58B30T0 3.0 L Turbo V8	1	(United States) Steven Aghakhani	PA	6
(Canada) ST Racing	BMW M4 GT3	BMW S58B30T0 3.0 L Turbo V8	28	(United States) Chandler Hull	P	1
(Canada) ST Racing	BMW M4 GT3	BMW S58B30T0 3.0 L Turbo V8	28	(United States) Jon Miller	P	1
(Canada) ST Racing	BMW M4 GT3	BMW S58B30T0 3.0 L Turbo V8	28	(Canada) Louis-Philippe Montour	P	1
(Canada) ST Racing	BMW M4 GT3	BMW S58B30T0 3.0 L Turbo V8	28	(Canada) Nick Wittmer	P	1
(Netherlands) JR Motorsport	BMW M6 GT3	BMW 4.4 L Turbo V8	2	(Netherlands) Ruud Olij	Am	2
(Netherlands) JR Motorsport	BMW M6 GT3	BMW 4.4 L Turbo V8	2	(Netherlands) Ted van Vliet	Am	2, 4
(Netherlands) JR Motorsport	BMW M6 GT3	BMW 4.4 L Turbo V8	2	(Netherlands) Bas Schouten	Am	4
(Netherlands) JR Motorsport	BMW M6 GT3	BMW 4.4 L Turbo V8	2	(Netherlands) Dirk Schouten	Am	4
(Germany) Car Collection Motorsport	Audi R8 LMS Evo 1 Audi R8 LMS Evo II 2	Audi 5.2 L V10	3	(Armenia) Artur Goroyan	Am	1
(Germany) Car Collection Motorsport	Audi R8 LMS Evo 1 Audi R8 LMS Evo II 2	Audi 5.2 L V10	3	(Germany) Patrick Kolb	Am	1
(Germany) Car Collection Motorsport	Audi R8 LMS Evo 1 Audi R8 LMS Evo II 2	Audi 5.2 L V10	3	(Germany) Martin Lechmann	Am	1
(Germany) Car Collection Motorsport	Audi R8 LMS Evo 1 Audi R8 LMS Evo II 2	Audi 5.2 L V10	3	(Russia) Roman Mavlanov	Am	1
(Germany) Car Collection Motorsport	Audi R8 LMS Evo 1 Audi R8 LMS Evo II 2	Audi 5.2 L V10	3	(Germany) Jörg Viebahn	Am	1
(Germany) Car Collection Motorsport	Audi R8 LMS Evo 1 Audi R8 LMS Evo II 2	Audi 5.2 L V10	34	(Germany) Johannes Dr. Kirchhoff	Am	1–4, 6
(Germany) Car Collection Motorsport	Audi R8 LMS Evo 1 Audi R8 LMS Evo II 2	Audi 5.2 L V10	34	(Germany) Elmar Grimm	Am	1–2, 4, 6
(Germany) Car Collection Motorsport	Audi R8 LMS Evo 1 Audi R8 LMS Evo II 2	Audi 5.2 L V10	34	(Germany) Max Edelhoff	Am	1, 3–4, 6
(Germany) Car Collection Motorsport	Audi R8 LMS Evo 1 Audi R8 LMS Evo II 2	Audi 5.2 L V10	34	(Germany) Gustav Edelhoff	Am	1
(Germany) Car Collection Motorsport	Audi R8 LMS Evo 1 Audi R8 LMS Evo II 2	Audi 5.2 L V10	34	(Germany) Ingo Vogler	Am	1, 6
(Germany) Car Collection Motorsport	Audi R8 LMS Evo 1 Audi R8 LMS Evo II 2	Audi 5.2 L V10	34	(Norway) Wiggo Dalmo	Am	2
(Germany) Car Collection Motorsport	Audi R8 LMS Evo 1 Audi R8 LMS Evo II 2	Audi 5.2 L V10	34	(Germany) Tim Müller	Am	3
(United Arab Emirates) (Oman) / Abu Dhabi Racing by HRT Bilstein (Note: Car No. 4 entered as Abu Dhabi Racing by HRT Bilstein and car No. 777 entered as Al Manar Racing by HRT.); (United Arab Emirates) (Oman) / AL Manar Racing by HRT	Mercedes-AMG GT3 Evo	Mercedes-AMG M159 6.2 L V8	4	(United Arab Emirates) Khaled Al Qubaisi	P	1
(United Arab Emirates) (Oman) / Abu Dhabi Racing by HRT Bilstein; (United Arab Emirates) (Oman) / AL Manar Racing by HRT	Mercedes-AMG GT3 Evo	Mercedes-AMG M159 6.2 L V8	4	(Germany) Hubert Haupt	P	1
(United Arab Emirates) (Oman) / Abu Dhabi Racing by HRT Bilstein; (United Arab Emirates) (Oman) / AL Manar Racing by HRT	Mercedes-AMG GT3 Evo	Mercedes-AMG M159 6.2 L V8	4	(Switzerland) Raffaele Marciello	P	1
(United Arab Emirates) (Oman) / Abu Dhabi Racing by HRT Bilstein; (United Arab Emirates) (Oman) / AL Manar Racing by HRT	Mercedes-AMG GT3 Evo	Mercedes-AMG M159 6.2 L V8	4	(Germany) Manuel Metzger	P	1
(United Arab Emirates) (Oman) / Abu Dhabi Racing by HRT Bilstein; (United Arab Emirates) (Oman) / AL Manar Racing by HRT	Mercedes-AMG GT3 Evo	Mercedes-AMG M159 6.2 L V8	777	(Oman) Al Faisal Al Zubair	P	1
(United Arab Emirates) (Oman) / Abu Dhabi Racing by HRT Bilstein; (United Arab Emirates) (Oman) / AL Manar Racing by HRT	Mercedes-AMG GT3 Evo	Mercedes-AMG M159 6.2 L V8	777	(Netherlands) Indy Dontje	P	1
(United Arab Emirates) (Oman) / Abu Dhabi Racing by HRT Bilstein; (United Arab Emirates) (Oman) / AL Manar Racing by HRT	Mercedes-AMG GT3 Evo	Mercedes-AMG M159 6.2 L V8	777	(Austria) Martin Konrad	P	1
(United Arab Emirates) (Oman) / Abu Dhabi Racing by HRT Bilstein; (United Arab Emirates) (Oman) / AL Manar Racing by HRT	Mercedes-AMG GT3 Evo	Mercedes-AMG M159 6.2 L V8	777	(Germany) Luca Stolz	P	1
(Netherlands) BoDa by Bas Koeten Racing	Bentley Continental GT3	Bentley 4.0 L Turbo V8	6	(Netherlands) Bob Herber	Am	2–3
(Netherlands) BoDa by Bas Koeten Racing	Bentley Continental GT3	Bentley 4.0 L Turbo V8	6	(Netherlands) Marcel van Berlo	Am	2
(Netherlands) BoDa by Bas Koeten Racing	Bentley Continental GT3	Bentley 4.0 L Turbo V8	6	(Netherlands) Mark van der Aa	Am	3
(Saudi Arabia) (Belgium) / MS7 by WRT (Note: Car No. 7 entered as MS7 by WRT and car No. 31 entered as Belgian Audi Club Team WRT.); (Saudi Arabia) (Belgium) / Belgian Audi Club Team WRT	Audi R8 LMS Evo	Audi 5.2 L V10	7	(Saudi Arabia) Mohammed Bin Saud Al Saud	P	1
(Saudi Arabia) (Belgium) / MS7 by WRT; (Saudi Arabia) (Belgium) / Belgian Audi Club Team WRT	Audi R8 LMS Evo	Audi 5.2 L V10	7	(Zimbabwe) Axcil Jefferies	P	1
(Saudi Arabia) (Belgium) / MS7 by WRT; (Saudi Arabia) (Belgium) / Belgian Audi Club Team WRT	Audi R8 LMS Evo	Audi 5.2 L V10	7	(Germany) Christopher Mies	P	1
(Saudi Arabia) (Belgium) / MS7 by WRT; (Saudi Arabia) (Belgium) / Belgian Audi Club Team WRT	Audi R8 LMS Evo	Audi 5.2 L V10	7	(France) Thomas Neubauer	P	1
(Saudi Arabia) (Belgium) / MS7 by WRT; (Saudi Arabia) (Belgium) / Belgian Audi Club Team WRT	Audi R8 LMS Evo	Audi 5.2 L V10	7	(Belgium) Dries Vanthoor	P	1
(Saudi Arabia) (Belgium) / MS7 by WRT; (Saudi Arabia) (Belgium) / Belgian Audi Club Team WRT	Audi R8 LMS Evo	Audi 5.2 L V10	31	(Germany) Benjamin Goethe	P	1
(Saudi Arabia) (Belgium) / MS7 by WRT; (Saudi Arabia) (Belgium) / Belgian Audi Club Team WRT	Audi R8 LMS Evo	Audi 5.2 L V10	31	(France) Arnold Robin	P	1
(Saudi Arabia) (Belgium) / MS7 by WRT; (Saudi Arabia) (Belgium) / Belgian Audi Club Team WRT	Audi R8 LMS Evo	Audi 5.2 L V10	31	(France) Maxime Robin	P	1
(Saudi Arabia) (Belgium) / MS7 by WRT; (Saudi Arabia) (Belgium) / Belgian Audi Club Team WRT	Audi R8 LMS Evo	Audi 5.2 L V10	31	(France) Jean-Baptiste Simmenauer	P	1
(Saudi Arabia) (Belgium) / MS7 by WRT; (Saudi Arabia) (Belgium) / Belgian Audi Club Team WRT	Audi R8 LMS Evo	Audi 5.2 L V10	31	(Belgium) Frédéric Vervisch	P	1
(Switzerland) Kessel Racing	Ferrari 488 GT3 Evo 2020	Ferrari 3.9 L Twin-Turbo V8	8	(Italy) Alessandro Cutrera	P	2
(Switzerland) Kessel Racing	Ferrari 488 GT3 Evo 2020	Ferrari 3.9 L Twin-Turbo V8	8	(Italy) Leonardo-Maria del Vecchio	P	2
(Switzerland) Kessel Racing	Ferrari 488 GT3 Evo 2020	Ferrari 3.9 L Twin-Turbo V8	8	(Italy) Marco Frezza	P	2
(Switzerland) Kessel Racing	Ferrari 488 GT3 Evo 2020	Ferrari 3.9 L Twin-Turbo V8	8	(Italy) David Fumanelli	P	2
(Switzerland) Kessel Racing	Ferrari 488 GT3 Evo 2020	Ferrari 3.9 L Twin-Turbo V8	8	(Italy) Marco Talarico	P	2
(Germany) Leipert Motorsport	Lamborghini Huracán GT3 Evo	Lamborghini 5.2 L V10	10	(United States) Jean-Francois Brunot	P	1
(Germany) Leipert Motorsport	Lamborghini Huracán GT3 Evo	Lamborghini 5.2 L V10	10	(Taiwan) Betty Chen	P	1
(Germany) Leipert Motorsport	Lamborghini Huracán GT3 Evo	Lamborghini 5.2 L V10	10	(Sweden) Joel Eriksson	P	1
(Germany) Leipert Motorsport	Lamborghini Huracán GT3 Evo	Lamborghini 5.2 L V10	10	(New Zealand) Brendon Leitch	P	1
(Germany) Leipert Motorsport	Lamborghini Huracán GT3 Evo	Lamborghini 5.2 L V10	10	(China) Kerong Li	P	1
(Switzerland) Hofor-Racing	Mercedes-AMG GT3	Mercedes-AMG M159 6.2 L V8	11	(Switzerland) Michael Kroll	Am	6
(Switzerland) Hofor-Racing	Mercedes-AMG GT3	Mercedes-AMG M159 6.2 L V8	11	(Switzerland) Chantal Prinz	Am	6
(Switzerland) Hofor-Racing	Mercedes-AMG GT3	Mercedes-AMG M159 6.2 L V8	11	(Germany) Alexander Prinz	Am	6
(Switzerland) Hofor-Racing	Mercedes-AMG GT3	Mercedes-AMG M159 6.2 L V8	11	(Germany) Max Partl	Am	6
(Switzerland) Hofor-Racing	Mercedes-AMG GT3	Mercedes-AMG M159 6.2 L V8	11	(Germany) Thomas Mühlenz	Am	6
(Russia) CapitalRT-Yadro	Mercedes-AMG GT3 Evo	Mercedes-AMG M159 6.2 L V8	13	(Russia) Dmitry Gvazava	Am	1
(Russia) CapitalRT-Yadro	Mercedes-AMG GT3 Evo	Mercedes-AMG M159 6.2 L V8	13	(Russia) Denis Remenyako	Am	1
(Russia) CapitalRT-Yadro	Mercedes-AMG GT3 Evo	Mercedes-AMG M159 6.2 L V8	13	(Russia) Victor Shaytar	Am	1
(Russia) CapitalRT-Yadro	Mercedes-AMG GT3 Evo	Mercedes-AMG M159 6.2 L V8	13	(Russia) Sergey Stolyarov	Am	1
(Denmark) Poulsen Motorsport	BMW M4 GT3	BMW S58B30T0 3.0 L Turbo V8	14	(Denmark) Roland Poulsen	PA	6
(Denmark) Poulsen Motorsport	BMW M4 GT3	BMW S58B30T0 3.0 L Turbo V8	14	(Denmark) Kristian Poulsen	PA	6
(Denmark) Poulsen Motorsport	BMW M4 GT3	BMW S58B30T0 3.0 L Turbo V8	14	(Denmark) Christoffer Nygaard	PA	6
(Denmark) Poulsen Motorsport	BMW M4 GT3	BMW S58B30T0 3.0 L Turbo V8	14	(Sweden) Alfred Nilsson	PA	6
(Germany) Phoenix Racing	Audi R8 LMS Evo II	Audi 5.2 L V10	18	(Austria) Michael Doppelmayr	PA	2–6
(Germany) Phoenix Racing	Audi R8 LMS Evo II	Audi 5.2 L V10	18	(Germany) Elia Erhart	PA	2–6
(Germany) Phoenix Racing	Audi R8 LMS Evo II	Audi 5.2 L V10	18	(Germany) Pierre Kaffer	PA	2–6
(Germany) Phoenix Racing	Audi R8 LMS Evo II	Audi 5.2 L V10	18	(Germany) Swen Herberger	PA	2, 4–6
(Germany) Phoenix Racing	Audi R8 LMS Evo II	Audi 5.2 L V10	18	(Poland) Patryk Krupinski	PA	3
(Netherlands) MP Motorsport	Mercedes-AMG GT3 Evo	Mercedes-AMG M159 6.2 L V8	19	(Netherlands) Bert de Heus	PA	1
(Netherlands) MP Motorsport	Mercedes-AMG GT3 Evo	Mercedes-AMG M159 6.2 L V8	19	(Netherlands) Daniël de Jong	PA	1
(Netherlands) MP Motorsport	Mercedes-AMG GT3 Evo	Mercedes-AMG M159 6.2 L V8	19	(Netherlands) Henk de Jong	PA	1
(Netherlands) MP Motorsport	Mercedes-AMG GT3 Evo	Mercedes-AMG M159 6.2 L V8	19	(Netherlands) Jaap van Lagen	PA	1
(Germany) (Australia) / SPS automotive performance (Note: Car No. 20 entered as SPS automotive performance and car no. 75 entered as SunEnergy1 by SPS automotive performance.); (Germany) (Australia) / SunEnergy1 by SPS automotive performance	Mercedes-AMG GT3 Evo	Mercedes-AMG M159 6.2 L V8	20	(Saudi Arabia) Reema Juffali	Am	1
(Germany) (Australia) / SPS automotive performance; (Germany) (Australia) / SunEnergy1 by SPS automotive performance	Mercedes-AMG GT3 Evo	Mercedes-AMG M159 6.2 L V8	20	(United States) George Kurtz	Am	1
(Germany) (Australia) / SPS automotive performance; (Germany) (Australia) / SunEnergy1 by SPS automotive performance	Mercedes-AMG GT3 Evo	Mercedes-AMG M159 6.2 L V8	20	(United Kingdom) Ian Loggie	Am	1
(Germany) (Australia) / SPS automotive performance; (Germany) (Australia) / SunEnergy1 by SPS automotive performance	Mercedes-AMG GT3 Evo	Mercedes-AMG M159 6.2 L V8	20	(Germany) Valentin Pierburg	Am	1
(Germany) (Australia) / SPS automotive performance; (Germany) (Australia) / SunEnergy1 by SPS automotive performance	Mercedes-AMG GT3 Evo	Mercedes-AMG M159 6.2 L V8	75	(Germany) Maro Engel	P	1
(Germany) (Australia) / SPS automotive performance; (Germany) (Australia) / SunEnergy1 by SPS automotive performance	Mercedes-AMG GT3 Evo	Mercedes-AMG M159 6.2 L V8	75	(France) Jules Gounon	P	1
(Germany) (Australia) / SPS automotive performance; (Germany) (Australia) / SunEnergy1 by SPS automotive performance	Mercedes-AMG GT3 Evo	Mercedes-AMG M159 6.2 L V8	75	(Canada) Mikaël Grenier	P	1
(Germany) (Australia) / SPS automotive performance; (Germany) (Australia) / SunEnergy1 by SPS automotive performance	Mercedes-AMG GT3 Evo	Mercedes-AMG M159 6.2 L V8	75	(Australia) Kenny Habul	P	1
(Germany) Wochenspiegel Team Monschau	Ferrari 488 GT3 Evo 2020	Ferrari 3.9 L Twin-Turbo V8	22	(Germany) Daniel Keilwitz	PA	3, 5–6
(Germany) Wochenspiegel Team Monschau	Ferrari 488 GT3 Evo 2020	Ferrari 3.9 L Twin-Turbo V8	22	(Germany) Jochen Krumbach	PA	3, 5
(Germany) Wochenspiegel Team Monschau	Ferrari 488 GT3 Evo 2020	Ferrari 3.9 L Twin-Turbo V8	22	(Germany) Georg Weiss	PA	3, 5–6
(Germany) Wochenspiegel Team Monschau	Ferrari 488 GT3 Evo 2020	Ferrari 3.9 L Twin-Turbo V8	22	(Germany) Leonard Weiss	PA	3, 5–6
(Germany) Wochenspiegel Team Monschau	Ferrari 488 GT3 Evo 2020	Ferrari 3.9 L Twin-Turbo V8	22	(Netherlands) Indy Dontje	PA	5–6
(Germany) Wochenspiegel Team Monschau	Ferrari 488 GT3 Evo 2020	Ferrari 3.9 L Twin-Turbo V8	22	(Argentina) Nicolás Varrone	PA	6
(Germany) Huber Racing	Porsche 911 GT3 R	Porsche 4.0 L Flat-6	23	(Germany) Jörg Dreisow	PA	6
(Germany) Huber Racing	Porsche 911 GT3 R	Porsche 4.0 L Flat-6	23	(Germany) Alexander Schwarzer	PA	6
(Germany) Huber Racing	Porsche 911 GT3 R	Porsche 4.0 L Flat-6	23	(Germany) Manuel Lauck	PA	6
(Germany) Huber Racing	Porsche 911 GT3 R	Porsche 4.0 L Flat-6	23	(Germany) Wolfgang Triller	PA	6
(Germany) Huber Racing	Porsche 911 GT3 R	Porsche 4.0 L Flat-6	23	(Germany) Marc Basseng	PA	6
(Germany) MANN-FILTER Team Landgraf	Mercedes-AMG GT3 Evo	Mercedes-AMG M159 6.2 L V8	25	(Austria) Alexander Hrachowina	PA	2
(Germany) MANN-FILTER Team Landgraf	Mercedes-AMG GT3 Evo	Mercedes-AMG M159 6.2 L V8	25	(Austria) Martin Konrad	PA	2
(Germany) MANN-FILTER Team Landgraf	Mercedes-AMG GT3 Evo	Mercedes-AMG M159 6.2 L V8	25	(Germany) Bernd Schneider	PA	2
(France) Saintéloc Racing	Audi R8 LMS Evo 1 Audi R8 LMS Evo II 2	Audi 5.2 L V10	26	(France) Olivier Esteves	Am	1–3
(France) Saintéloc Racing	Audi R8 LMS Evo 1 Audi R8 LMS Evo II 2	Audi 5.2 L V10	26	(France) Simon Gachet	Am	1–3
(France) Saintéloc Racing	Audi R8 LMS Evo 1 Audi R8 LMS Evo II 2	Audi 5.2 L V10	26	(Luxembourg) Christian Kelders	Am	1–3
(France) Saintéloc Racing	Audi R8 LMS Evo 1 Audi R8 LMS Evo II 2	Audi 5.2 L V10	26	(Belgium) Pierre-Yves Paque	Am	1–3
(France) Saintéloc Racing	Audi R8 LMS Evo 1 Audi R8 LMS Evo II 2	Audi 5.2 L V10	26	(France) Olivier Esteves	PA	5
(France) Saintéloc Racing	Audi R8 LMS Evo 1 Audi R8 LMS Evo II 2	Audi 5.2 L V10	26	(France) Simon Gachet	PA	5
(France) Saintéloc Racing	Audi R8 LMS Evo 1 Audi R8 LMS Evo II 2	Audi 5.2 L V10	26	(Luxembourg) Christian Kelders	PA	5
(France) Saintéloc Racing	Audi R8 LMS Evo 1 Audi R8 LMS Evo II 2	Audi 5.2 L V10	26	(Belgium) Nicolas Baert	PA	5
(France) Saintéloc Racing	Audi R8 LMS Evo 1 Audi R8 LMS Evo II 2	Audi 5.2 L V10	26	(Switzerland) Lucas Légeret	PA	5
(Germany) Team Joos Sportwagentechnik	Porsche 911 GT3 R	Porsche 4.0 L Flat-6	27	(Germany) Friedel Bleifuss	PA	1
(Germany) Team Joos Sportwagentechnik	Porsche 911 GT3 R	Porsche 4.0 L Flat-6	27	(Germany) Jannes Fittje	PA	1
(Germany) Team Joos Sportwagentechnik	Porsche 911 GT3 R	Porsche 4.0 L Flat-6	27	(Germany) Steffen Görig	PA	1
(Germany) Team Joos Sportwagentechnik	Porsche 911 GT3 R	Porsche 4.0 L Flat-6	27	(Germany) Michael Joos	PA	1
(Germany) Schubert Motorsport	BMW M4 GT3	BMW S58B30T0 3.0 L Turbo V8	30	(Germany) Marcel Lenerz	P	1
(Germany) Schubert Motorsport	BMW M4 GT3	BMW S58B30T0 3.0 L Turbo V8	30	(Germany) Jens Liebhauser	P	1
(Germany) Schubert Motorsport	BMW M4 GT3	BMW S58B30T0 3.0 L Turbo V8	30	(United Kingdom) Jordan Witt	P	1
(Germany) Schubert Motorsport	BMW M4 GT3	BMW S58B30T0 3.0 L Turbo V8	30	(United Kingdom) Nick Yelloly	P	1
(Germany) PROsport Performance AMR	Aston Martin Vantage AMR GT3	Aston Martin 4.0 L Turbo V8	39	(Belgium) Simon Balcaen	Am	1
(Germany) PROsport Performance AMR	Aston Martin Vantage AMR GT3	Aston Martin 4.0 L Turbo V8	39	(Belgium) Guillaume Dumarey	Am	1
(Germany) PROsport Performance AMR	Aston Martin Vantage AMR GT3	Aston Martin 4.0 L Turbo V8	39	(Belgium) Maxime Dumarey	Am	1
(Germany) PROsport Performance AMR	Aston Martin Vantage AMR GT3	Aston Martin 4.0 L Turbo V8	39	(Belgium) Jean Glorieux	Am	1
(Slovakia) ARC Bratislava	Lamborghini Huracán GT3	Lamborghini 5.2 L V10	44	(United Kingdom) Tom Jackson	Am	1
(Slovakia) ARC Bratislava	Lamborghini Huracán GT3	Lamborghini 5.2 L V10	44	(Slovakia) Mat'o Konôpka	Am	1
(Slovakia) ARC Bratislava	Lamborghini Huracán GT3	Lamborghini 5.2 L V10	44	(Slovakia) Miro Konôpka	Am	1
(Slovakia) ARC Bratislava	Lamborghini Huracán GT3	Lamborghini 5.2 L V10	44	(Poland) Andrzej Lewandowski	Am	1
(Slovakia) ARC Bratislava	Lamborghini Huracán GT3	Lamborghini 5.2 L V10	44	(Slovakia) Zdeno Mikulasko	Am	1
(Italy) Dinamic Motorsport	Porsche 911 GT3 R	Porsche 4.0 L Flat-6	54	(Austria) Klaus Bachler	P	1
(Italy) Dinamic Motorsport	Porsche 911 GT3 R	Porsche 4.0 L Flat-6	54	(Germany) Marvin Dienst	P	1
(Italy) Dinamic Motorsport	Porsche 911 GT3 R	Porsche 4.0 L Flat-6	54	(Russia) Stanislav Minsky	P	1
(Italy) Dinamic Motorsport	Porsche 911 GT3 R	Porsche 4.0 L Flat-6	54	(Germany) Marco Seefried	P	1
(Italy) Dinamic Motorsport	Porsche 911 GT3 R	Porsche 4.0 L Flat-6	54	(Germany) Murad Sultanov	P	1
(Italy) Dinamic Motorsport	Porsche 911 GT3 R	Porsche 4.0 L Flat-6	54	(Italy) Roberto Pampanini	PA	6
(Italy) Dinamic Motorsport	Porsche 911 GT3 R	Porsche 4.0 L Flat-6	54	(Italy) Amadeo Pampanini	PA	6
(Italy) Dinamic Motorsport	Porsche 911 GT3 R	Porsche 4.0 L Flat-6	54	(Switzerland) Stefano Monaco	PA	6
(Italy) Dinamic Motorsport	Porsche 911 GT3 R	Porsche 4.0 L Flat-6	54	(Switzerland) Nicolas Stürzinger	PA	6
(Italy) Dinamic Motorsport	Porsche 911 GT3 R	Porsche 4.0 L Flat-6	67	(Italy) Matteo Cairoli	P	1
(Italy) Dinamic Motorsport	Porsche 911 GT3 R	Porsche 4.0 L Flat-6	67	(Switzerland) Mauro Calamia	P	1
(Italy) Dinamic Motorsport	Porsche 911 GT3 R	Porsche 4.0 L Flat-6	67	(Switzerland) Stefano Monaco	P	1
(Italy) Dinamic Motorsport	Porsche 911 GT3 R	Porsche 4.0 L Flat-6	67	(Italy) Roberto Pampanini	P	1
(Italy) MP Racing	Mercedes-AMG GT3 Evo	Mercedes-AMG M159 6.2 L V8	58	(Italy) Corinna Gostner	Am	2
(Italy) MP Racing	Mercedes-AMG GT3 Evo	Mercedes-AMG M159 6.2 L V8	58	(Italy) David Gostner	Am	2
(Italy) MP Racing	Mercedes-AMG GT3 Evo	Mercedes-AMG M159 6.2 L V8	58	(Italy) Thomas Gostner	Am	2
(Italy) MP Racing	Mercedes-AMG GT3 Evo	Mercedes-AMG M159 6.2 L V8	58	(Italy) Giorgio Sernagiotto	Am	2
(New Zealand) Earl Bamber Motorsport	Porsche 911 GT3 R	Porsche 4.0 L Flat-6	61	(Malaysia) Adrian D'Silva	P	2–3
(New Zealand) Earl Bamber Motorsport	Porsche 911 GT3 R	Porsche 4.0 L Flat-6	61	(New Zealand) Reid Harker	P	2
(New Zealand) Earl Bamber Motorsport	Porsche 911 GT3 R	Porsche 4.0 L Flat-6	61	(New Zealand) Matthew Payne	P	2
(New Zealand) Earl Bamber Motorsport	Porsche 911 GT3 R	Porsche 4.0 L Flat-6	61	(Canada) Jeffrey Kingsley	P	3
(New Zealand) Earl Bamber Motorsport	Porsche 911 GT3 R	Porsche 4.0 L Flat-6	61	(Thailand) Tanart Sathienthirakul	P	3
(Lithuania) Juta Racing	Audi R8 LMS Evo	Audi 5.2 L V10	71	(Lithuania) Julius Adomavičius	P	2–4
(Lithuania) Juta Racing	Audi R8 LMS Evo	Audi 5.2 L V10	71	(Lithuania) Jonas Gelžinis	P	2–4
(Lithuania) Juta Racing	Audi R8 LMS Evo	Audi 5.2 L V10	71	(Lithuania) Andrius Gelžinis	P	2–3
(Lithuania) Juta Racing	Audi R8 LMS Evo	Audi 5.2 L V10	71	(Lithuania) Eimantas Navikauskas	P	4
(Lithuania) Juta Racing	Audi R8 LMS Evo	Audi 5.2 L V10	71	(Lithuania) Eimantas Navikauskas	PA	6
(Lithuania) Juta Racing	Audi R8 LMS Evo	Audi 5.2 L V10	71	(Lithuania) Aurimas Jablonskis	PA	6
(Lithuania) Juta Racing	Audi R8 LMS Evo	Audi 5.2 L V10	71	(Lithuania) Paul August	PA	6
(Lithuania) Juta Racing	Audi R8 LMS Evo	Audi 5.2 L V10	71	(United Kingdom) Lars Viljoen	PA	6
(Lithuania) Juta Racing	Audi R8 LMS Evo	Audi 5.2 L V10	71	(Lithuania) Jonas Gelžinis	PA	6
(Lithuania) Juta Racing	Audi R8 LMS Evo	Audi 5.2 L V10	72	(Lithuania) Aurimas Jablonskis	PA	2
(Lithuania) Juta Racing	Audi R8 LMS Evo	Audi 5.2 L V10	72	(Lithuania) Ignas Gelžinis	PA	2
(Lithuania) Juta Racing	Audi R8 LMS Evo	Audi 5.2 L V10	72	(Lithuania) Audrius Navickas	PA	2
(United Kingdom) Barwell Motorsport	Lamborghini Huracán GT3 Evo	Lamborghini 5.2 L V10	77	(Switzerland) Adrian Amstutz	P	1
(United Kingdom) Barwell Motorsport	Lamborghini Huracán GT3 Evo	Lamborghini 5.2 L V10	77	(Italy) Mirko Bortolotti	P	1
(United Kingdom) Barwell Motorsport	Lamborghini Huracán GT3 Evo	Lamborghini 5.2 L V10	77	(Netherlands) Rik Breukers	P	1
(United Kingdom) Barwell Motorsport	Lamborghini Huracán GT3 Evo	Lamborghini 5.2 L V10	77	(Switzerland) Rolf Ineichen	P	1
(France) Racetivity	Mercedes-AMG GT3 Evo	Mercedes-AMG M159 6.2 L V8	83	(France) Emmanuel Collard	PA	1
(France) Racetivity	Mercedes-AMG GT3 Evo	Mercedes-AMG M159 6.2 L V8	83	(France) François Perrodo	PA	1
(France) Racetivity	Mercedes-AMG GT3 Evo	Mercedes-AMG M159 6.2 L V8	83	(France) Charles-Henri Samani	PA	1
(France) Racetivity	Mercedes-AMG GT3 Evo	Mercedes-AMG M159 6.2 L V8	83	(France) Matthieu Vaxivière	PA	1
(United States) CP Racing	Mercedes-AMG GT3 Evo	Mercedes-AMG M159 6.2 L V8	85	(United States) Charles Espenlaub	Am	1–6
(United States) CP Racing	Mercedes-AMG GT3 Evo	Mercedes-AMG M159 6.2 L V8	85	(United States) Charles Putman	Am	1–6
(United States) CP Racing	Mercedes-AMG GT3 Evo	Mercedes-AMG M159 6.2 L V8	85	(United States) Shane Lewis	Am	1, 3, 5–6
(United States) CP Racing	Mercedes-AMG GT3 Evo	Mercedes-AMG M159 6.2 L V8	85	(United Kingdom) Phil Quaife	Am	1
(United States) CP Racing	Mercedes-AMG GT3 Evo	Mercedes-AMG M159 6.2 L V8	85	(United States) Joe Foster	Am	2, 4–6
(Germany) (Australia) (Luxembourg) / Herberth Motorsport (Note: Car No. 91 entered as Herberth Motorsport, car no. 92 entered as Grove Motorsport by Herberth Motorsport and car no. 93 DUWO Racing by Herberth Motorsport.); (Germany) (Australia) (Luxembourg) / Grove Motorsport by Herberth Motorsport; (Germany) (Australia) (Luxembourg) / DUWO Racing by Herberth Motorsport	Porsche 911 GT3 R	Porsche 4.0 L Flat-6	91	(Switzerland) Daniel Allemann	PA	1, 5–6
(Germany) (Australia) (Luxembourg) / Herberth Motorsport; (Germany) (Australia) (Luxembourg) / Grove Motorsport by Herberth Motorsport; (Germany) (Australia) (Luxembourg) / DUWO Racing by Herberth Motorsport	Porsche 911 GT3 R	Porsche 4.0 L Flat-6	91	(Germany) Ralf Bohn	PA	1, 5–6
(Germany) (Australia) (Luxembourg) / Herberth Motorsport; (Germany) (Australia) (Luxembourg) / Grove Motorsport by Herberth Motorsport; (Germany) (Australia) (Luxembourg) / DUWO Racing by Herberth Motorsport	Porsche 911 GT3 R	Porsche 4.0 L Flat-6	91	(Germany) Alfred Renauer	PA	1, 5–6
(Germany) (Australia) (Luxembourg) / Herberth Motorsport; (Germany) (Australia) (Luxembourg) / Grove Motorsport by Herberth Motorsport; (Germany) (Australia) (Luxembourg) / DUWO Racing by Herberth Motorsport	Porsche 911 GT3 R	Porsche 4.0 L Flat-6	91	(Germany) Robert Renauer	PA	1, 5–6
(Germany) (Australia) (Luxembourg) / Herberth Motorsport; (Germany) (Australia) (Luxembourg) / Grove Motorsport by Herberth Motorsport; (Germany) (Australia) (Luxembourg) / DUWO Racing by Herberth Motorsport	Porsche 911 GT3 R	Porsche 4.0 L Flat-6	91	(Germany) Jürgen Häring	PA	5-6
(Germany) (Australia) (Luxembourg) / Herberth Motorsport; (Germany) (Australia) (Luxembourg) / Grove Motorsport by Herberth Motorsport; (Germany) (Australia) (Luxembourg) / DUWO Racing by Herberth Motorsport	Porsche 911 GT3 R	Porsche 4.0 L Flat-6	91	(Switzerland) Daniel Allemann	P	2–3
(Germany) (Australia) (Luxembourg) / Herberth Motorsport; (Germany) (Australia) (Luxembourg) / Grove Motorsport by Herberth Motorsport; (Germany) (Australia) (Luxembourg) / DUWO Racing by Herberth Motorsport	Porsche 911 GT3 R	Porsche 4.0 L Flat-6	91	(Germany) Ralf Bohn	P	2–3
(Germany) (Australia) (Luxembourg) / Herberth Motorsport; (Germany) (Australia) (Luxembourg) / Grove Motorsport by Herberth Motorsport; (Germany) (Australia) (Luxembourg) / DUWO Racing by Herberth Motorsport	Porsche 911 GT3 R	Porsche 4.0 L Flat-6	91	(Germany) Alfred Renauer	P	2
(Germany) (Australia) (Luxembourg) / Herberth Motorsport; (Germany) (Australia) (Luxembourg) / Grove Motorsport by Herberth Motorsport; (Germany) (Australia) (Luxembourg) / DUWO Racing by Herberth Motorsport	Porsche 911 GT3 R	Porsche 4.0 L Flat-6	91	(Germany) Robert Renauer	P	2
(Germany) (Australia) (Luxembourg) / Herberth Motorsport; (Germany) (Australia) (Luxembourg) / Grove Motorsport by Herberth Motorsport; (Germany) (Australia) (Luxembourg) / DUWO Racing by Herberth Motorsport	Porsche 911 GT3 R	Porsche 4.0 L Flat-6	91	(Germany) Jürgen Häring	P	3
(Germany) (Australia) (Luxembourg) / Herberth Motorsport; (Germany) (Australia) (Luxembourg) / Grove Motorsport by Herberth Motorsport; (Germany) (Australia) (Luxembourg) / DUWO Racing by Herberth Motorsport	Porsche 911 GT3 R	Porsche 4.0 L Flat-6	92	(Australia) Brenton Grove	P	1
(Germany) (Australia) (Luxembourg) / Herberth Motorsport; (Germany) (Australia) (Luxembourg) / Grove Motorsport by Herberth Motorsport; (Germany) (Australia) (Luxembourg) / DUWO Racing by Herberth Motorsport	Porsche 911 GT3 R	Porsche 4.0 L Flat-6	92	(Australia) Stephen Grove	P	1
(Germany) (Australia) (Luxembourg) / Herberth Motorsport; (Germany) (Australia) (Luxembourg) / Grove Motorsport by Herberth Motorsport; (Germany) (Australia) (Luxembourg) / DUWO Racing by Herberth Motorsport	Porsche 911 GT3 R	Porsche 4.0 L Flat-6	92	(Germany) Sven Müller	P	1
(Germany) (Australia) (Luxembourg) / Herberth Motorsport; (Germany) (Australia) (Luxembourg) / Grove Motorsport by Herberth Motorsport; (Germany) (Australia) (Luxembourg) / DUWO Racing by Herberth Motorsport	Porsche 911 GT3 R	Porsche 4.0 L Flat-6	92	(Australia) Anton de Pasquale	P	1
(Germany) (Australia) (Luxembourg) / Herberth Motorsport; (Germany) (Australia) (Luxembourg) / Grove Motorsport by Herberth Motorsport; (Germany) (Australia) (Luxembourg) / DUWO Racing by Herberth Motorsport	Porsche 911 GT3 R	Porsche 4.0 L Flat-6	93	(Russia) Andrey Mukovoz	PA	1
(Germany) (Australia) (Luxembourg) / Herberth Motorsport; (Germany) (Australia) (Luxembourg) / Grove Motorsport by Herberth Motorsport; (Germany) (Australia) (Luxembourg) / DUWO Racing by Herberth Motorsport	Porsche 911 GT3 R	Porsche 4.0 L Flat-6	93	(Russia) Sergey Peregudov	PA	1
(Germany) (Australia) (Luxembourg) / Herberth Motorsport; (Germany) (Australia) (Luxembourg) / Grove Motorsport by Herberth Motorsport; (Germany) (Australia) (Luxembourg) / DUWO Racing by Herberth Motorsport	Porsche 911 GT3 R	Porsche 4.0 L Flat-6	93	(Luxembourg) Dylan Pereira	PA	1
(Germany) (Australia) (Luxembourg) / Herberth Motorsport; (Germany) (Australia) (Luxembourg) / Grove Motorsport by Herberth Motorsport; (Germany) (Australia) (Luxembourg) / DUWO Racing by Herberth Motorsport	Porsche 911 GT3 R	Porsche 4.0 L Flat-6	93	(Russia) Stanislav Sidoruk	PA	1
(United Kingdom) Duel Racing with TF Sport	Aston Martin Vantage AMR GT3	Aston Martin 4.0 L Turbo V8	95	(Oman) Ahmad Al Harthy	Am	1
(United Kingdom) Duel Racing with TF Sport	Aston Martin Vantage AMR GT3	Aston Martin 4.0 L Turbo V8	95	(United Arab Emirates) Nabil Moutran	Am	1
(United Kingdom) Duel Racing with TF Sport	Aston Martin Vantage AMR GT3	Aston Martin 4.0 L Turbo V8	95	(United Arab Emirates) Ramzi Moutran	Am	1
(United Kingdom) Duel Racing with TF Sport	Aston Martin Vantage AMR GT3	Aston Martin 4.0 L Turbo V8	95	(United Arab Emirates) Sami Moutran	Am	1
(Germany) Attempto Racing	Audi R8 LMS Evo	Audi 5.2 L V10	99	(Germany) Alex Aka	P	1
(Germany) Attempto Racing	Audi R8 LMS Evo	Audi 5.2 L V10	99	(Germany) Luca Engstler	P	1
(Germany) Attempto Racing	Audi R8 LMS Evo	Audi 5.2 L V10	99	(United Kingdom) Finlay Hutchison	P	1
(Germany) Attempto Racing	Audi R8 LMS Evo	Audi 5.2 L V10	99	(Austria) Nicolas Schöll	P	1
(Germany) Attempto Racing	Audi R8 LMS Evo	Audi 5.2 L V10	99	(Germany) Florian Scholze	P	1
GTX
(France) Vortex V8	Vortex 1.0 GTX	Chevrolet 6.2 L V8	701	(France) Lionel Amrouche	1–5	
(France) Vortex V8	Vortex 1.0 GTX	Chevrolet 6.2 L V8	701	(France) Philippe Bonnel	1–5	
(France) Vortex V8	Vortex 1.0 GTX	Chevrolet 6.2 L V8	701	(France) Sebastien Lajoux	1–4	
(France) Vortex V8	Vortex 1.0 GTX	Chevrolet 6.2 L V8	701	(France) Philippe Gruau	1	
(France) Vortex V8	Vortex 1.0 GTX	Chevrolet 6.2 L V8	701	(France) Arnaud Gomez	6	
(France) Vortex V8	Vortex 1.0 GTX	Chevrolet 6.2 L V8	701	(France) Olivier Gomez	6	
(France) Vortex V8	Vortex 1.0 GTX	Chevrolet 6.2 L V8	701	(France) Lucas Lasserre	6	
(France) Vortex V8	Vortex 1.0 GTX	Chevrolet 6.2 L V8	702	(France) Gilles Courtois	2–3	
(France) Vortex V8	Vortex 1.0 GTX	Chevrolet 6.2 L V8	702	(France) Patrick Brochier	2	
(France) Vortex V8	Vortex 1.0 GTX	Chevrolet 6.2 L V8	702	(Switzerland) Nicolas Nobs	2, 6	
(France) Vortex V8	Vortex 1.0 GTX	Chevrolet 6.2 L V8	702	(France) Boris Gimond	3	
(France) Vortex V8	Vortex 1.0 GTX	Chevrolet 6.2 L V8	702	(France) Philippe Gruau	3, 6	
(France) Vortex V8	Vortex 1.0 GTX	Chevrolet 6.2 L V8	702	(France) Lionel Amrouche	6	
(France) Vortex V8	Vortex 1.0 GTX	Chevrolet 6.2 L V8	702	(France) Philippe Bonnel	6	
(France) Vortex V8	Vortex 1.0 GTX	Chevrolet 6.2 L V8	702	(Spain) Francesc Gutierrez Agüi	6	
(France) Vortex V8	Vortex 1.0 GTX	Chevrolet 6.2 L V8	703	(France) Christophe Decultot	2	
(France) Vortex V8	Vortex 1.0 GTX	Chevrolet 6.2 L V8	703	(France) Pierre Fontaine	2	
(France) Vortex V8	Vortex 1.0 GTX	Chevrolet 6.2 L V8	703	(France) Philippe Gruau	2	
(Belgium) PK Carsport	Audi R8 LMS GT2	Audi 5.2 L V10	704	(Belgium) Peter Guelinckx	1	
(Belgium) PK Carsport	Audi R8 LMS GT2	Audi 5.2 L V10	704	(Belgium) Bert Longin	1	
(Belgium) PK Carsport	Audi R8 LMS GT2	Audi 5.2 L V10	704	(Belgium) Stienes Longin	1	
(Belgium) PK Carsport	Audi R8 LMS GT2	Audi 5.2 L V10	704	(Belgium) Stijn Lowette	1	
(Germany) Leipert Motorsport	Lamborghini Huracán Super Trofeo	Lamborghini 5.2 L V10	710	(United States) Erik Davis	1	
(Germany) Leipert Motorsport	Lamborghini Huracán Super Trofeo	Lamborghini 5.2 L V10	710	(United States) Gregg Gorski	1, 6	
(Germany) Leipert Motorsport	Lamborghini Huracán Super Trofeo	Lamborghini 5.2 L V10	710	(Germany) Fidel Leib	1	
(Germany) Leipert Motorsport	Lamborghini Huracán Super Trofeo	Lamborghini 5.2 L V10	710	(France) Alban Varutti	1	
(Germany) Leipert Motorsport	Lamborghini Huracán Super Trofeo	Lamborghini 5.2 L V10	710	(United States) Gerhard Watzinger	1, 6	
(Germany) Leipert Motorsport	Lamborghini Huracán Super Trofeo	Lamborghini 5.2 L V10	710	(China) Kerong Li	3–6	
(Germany) Leipert Motorsport	Lamborghini Huracán Super Trofeo	Lamborghini 5.2 L V10	710	(United States) Jean-Francois Brunot	3–6	
(Germany) Leipert Motorsport	Lamborghini Huracán Super Trofeo	Lamborghini 5.2 L V10	710	(United States) Tyler Cooke	3, 5	
(Germany) Leipert Motorsport	Lamborghini Huracán Super Trofeo	Lamborghini 5.2 L V10	710	(Germany) Tim Müller	4	
(Germany) Leipert Motorsport	Lamborghini Huracán Super Trofeo	Lamborghini 5.2 L V10	710	(New Zealand) Brendon Leitch	6	
(Austria) Razoon - More than Racing	KTM X-Bow GT2 Concept	Audi 2.5 L I5	714	(Austria) Daniel Drexel	1	
(Austria) Razoon - More than Racing	KTM X-Bow GT2 Concept	Audi 2.5 L I5	714	(Austria) Andreas Höfler	1	
(Austria) Razoon - More than Racing	KTM X-Bow GT2 Concept	Audi 2.5 L I5	714	(Austria) Dominik Olbert	1	
(Austria) Razoon - More than Racing	KTM X-Bow GT2 Concept	Audi 2.5 L I5	714	(Austria) Kevin Raith	1	
(Austria) Razoon - More than Racing	KTM X-Bow GT2 Concept	Audi 2.5 L I5	714	(Austria) Robert Schiftner	1	
(Germany) 9und11 Racing	Porsche 991 GT3 Cup MR	Porsche 4.0 L Flat-6	719	(Germany) Georg Goder	3	
(Germany) 9und11 Racing	Porsche 991 GT3 Cup MR	Porsche 4.0 L Flat-6	719	(Germany) Ralf Oehme	3	
(Germany) 9und11 Racing	Porsche 991 GT3 Cup MR	Porsche 4.0 L Flat-6	719	(Germany) Martin Schlüter	3	
(Lithuania) RD Signs – Siauliai Racing Team	Lamborghini Huracán Super Trofeo Evo 2 Lamborghini Huracán Super Trofeo Evo2 5	Lamborghini 5.2 L V10	720	(Lithuania) Audrius Butkevicius	2–6	
(Lithuania) RD Signs – Siauliai Racing Team	Lamborghini Huracán Super Trofeo Evo 2 Lamborghini Huracán Super Trofeo Evo2 5	Lamborghini 5.2 L V10	720	(Italy) Nicola Michelon	2–6	
(Lithuania) RD Signs – Siauliai Racing Team	Lamborghini Huracán Super Trofeo Evo 2 Lamborghini Huracán Super Trofeo Evo2 5	Lamborghini 5.2 L V10	720	(Lithuania) Paulius Paskevicius	2–6	
(Lithuania) RD Signs – Siauliai Racing Team	Lamborghini Huracán Super Trofeo Evo 2 Lamborghini Huracán Super Trofeo Evo2 5	Lamborghini 5.2 L V10	720	(Latvia) Arturs Batraks	6	
(Lithuania) RD Signs – Siauliai Racing Team	Lamborghini Huracán Super Trofeo Evo 2 Lamborghini Huracán Super Trofeo Evo2 5	Lamborghini 5.2 L V10	720	(Mexico) Alfredo Hernandez	6	
(Germany) HRT Performance	Porsche 992 GT3 Cup	Porsche 4.0 L Flat-6	728	(United States) Jean-Francois Brunot	2	
(Germany) HRT Performance	Porsche 992 GT3 Cup	Porsche 4.0 L Flat-6	728	(China) Kerong Li	2	
(Spain) E2P Racing	Porsche 991 GT3 II Cup	Porsche 4.0 L Flat-6	910	(Spain) Pablo Burguera	4	
(Spain) E2P Racing	Porsche 991 GT3 II Cup	Porsche 4.0 L Flat-6	910	(Spain) Javier Morcillo	4	
992
(Belgium) Red Ant Racing	Porsche 992 GT3 Cup	Porsche 4.0 L Flat-6	903	(Belgium) Ayrton Redant	Am	2–5
(Belgium) Red Ant Racing	Porsche 992 GT3 Cup	Porsche 4.0 L Flat-6	903	(Belgium) Bert Redant	Am	2–5
(Belgium) Red Ant Racing	Porsche 992 GT3 Cup	Porsche 4.0 L Flat-6	903	(Belgium) Yannick Redant	Am	2–5
(Belgium) Red Ant Racing	Porsche 992 GT3 Cup	Porsche 4.0 L Flat-6	903	(Belgium) Ayrton Redant	P	6
(Belgium) Red Ant Racing	Porsche 992 GT3 Cup	Porsche 4.0 L Flat-6	903	(Belgium) Bert Redant	P	6
(Belgium) Red Ant Racing	Porsche 992 GT3 Cup	Porsche 4.0 L Flat-6	903	(Belgium) Yannick Redant	P	6
(Belgium) Red Ant Racing	Porsche 992 GT3 Cup	Porsche 4.0 L Flat-6	903	(Belgium) Sam Dejonghe	P	6
(Belgium) Red Ant Racing	Porsche 992 GT3 Cup	Porsche 4.0 L Flat-6	904	(Belgium) Philippe Wils	Am	1–5
(Belgium) Red Ant Racing	Porsche 992 GT3 Cup	Porsche 4.0 L Flat-6	904	(Belgium) Kurt Hensen	Am	1–3
(Belgium) Red Ant Racing	Porsche 992 GT3 Cup	Porsche 4.0 L Flat-6	904	(Belgium) Tom Boonen	Am	1, 4
(Belgium) Red Ant Racing	Porsche 992 GT3 Cup	Porsche 4.0 L Flat-6	904	(Netherlands) Luc Vanderfeesten	Am	1
(Belgium) Red Ant Racing	Porsche 992 GT3 Cup	Porsche 4.0 L Flat-6	904	(Germany) Andreas Mayrl	Am	2
(Belgium) Red Ant Racing	Porsche 992 GT3 Cup	Porsche 4.0 L Flat-6	904	(Belgium) Sam Dejonghe	Am	4
(Belgium) Red Ant Racing	Porsche 992 GT3 Cup	Porsche 4.0 L Flat-6	904	(Belgium) Wim Spinoy	Am	6
(Belgium) Red Ant Racing	Porsche 992 GT3 Cup	Porsche 4.0 L Flat-6	904	(Belgium) Kobe de Breucker	Am	6
(Belgium) Red Ant Racing	Porsche 992 GT3 Cup	Porsche 4.0 L Flat-6	904	(Belgium) Jimmy de Breucker	Am	6
(Belgium) Red Ant Racing	Porsche 992 GT3 Cup	Porsche 4.0 L Flat-6	904	(South Africa) Arnold Neveling	Am	6
(Germany) Plusline-Racing-Team by Terting&Müskens	Porsche 992 GT3 Cup	Porsche 4.0 L Flat-6	905	(Germany) Peter Terting	Am	4
(Germany) Plusline-Racing-Team by Terting&Müskens	Porsche 992 GT3 Cup	Porsche 4.0 L Flat-6	905	(Germany) Carrie Schreiner	Am	4
(Germany) Plusline-Racing-Team by Terting&Müskens	Porsche 992 GT3 Cup	Porsche 4.0 L Flat-6	905	(Germany) Philipp Gresek	Am	4
(Germany) Plusline-Racing-Team by Terting&Müskens	Porsche 992 GT3 Cup	Porsche 4.0 L Flat-6	905	(Germany) Harald Geisselhart	Am	4
(Luxembourg) Seblajoux Racing by DUWO Racing	Porsche 992 GT3 Cup	Porsche 4.0 L Flat-6	908	(France) Sebastian Lajoux	Am	6
(Luxembourg) Seblajoux Racing by DUWO Racing	Porsche 992 GT3 Cup	Porsche 4.0 L Flat-6	908	(France) David Sarny	Am	6
(Luxembourg) Seblajoux Racing by DUWO Racing	Porsche 992 GT3 Cup	Porsche 4.0 L Flat-6	908	(France) Laurent Cochard	Am	6
(Luxembourg) Seblajoux Racing by DUWO Racing	Porsche 992 GT3 Cup	Porsche 4.0 L Flat-6	908	(Switzerland) Laurent Misbach	Am	6
(Netherlands) Red Camel-Jordans.nl	Porsche 992 GT3 Cup	Porsche 4.0 L Flat-6	909	(Netherlands) Ivo Breukers	P	1–6
(Netherlands) Red Camel-Jordans.nl	Porsche 992 GT3 Cup	Porsche 4.0 L Flat-6	909	(Netherlands) Jeroen Bleekemolen	P	1
(Netherlands) Red Camel-Jordans.nl	Porsche 992 GT3 Cup	Porsche 4.0 L Flat-6	909	(Lithuania) Julius Adomavičius	P	1
(Netherlands) Red Camel-Jordans.nl	Porsche 992 GT3 Cup	Porsche 4.0 L Flat-6	909	(Netherlands) Morris Schuring	P	1
(Netherlands) Red Camel-Jordans.nl	Porsche 992 GT3 Cup	Porsche 4.0 L Flat-6	909	(Netherlands) Luc Breukers	P	2–6
(Netherlands) Red Camel-Jordans.nl	Porsche 992 GT3 Cup	Porsche 4.0 L Flat-6	909	(Netherlands) Rik Breukers	P	2–6
(Netherlands) Red Camel-Jordans.nl	Porsche 992 GT3 Cup	Porsche 4.0 L Flat-6	909	(Switzerland) Fabian Danz	P	6
(France) Porsche Lorient Racing	Porsche 992 GT3 Cup	Porsche 4.0 L Flat-6	911	(France) Frédéric Ancel	Am	2
(France) Porsche Lorient Racing	Porsche 992 GT3 Cup	Porsche 4.0 L Flat-6	911	(France) Pascal Gibon	Am	2
(France) Porsche Lorient Racing	Porsche 992 GT3 Cup	Porsche 4.0 L Flat-6	911	(France) Ludovic Loeul	Am	2
(France) Porsche Lorient Racing	Porsche 992 GT3 Cup	Porsche 4.0 L Flat-6	911	(France) Hervé Tremblaye	Am	2
(France) Porsche Lorient Racing	Porsche 992 GT3 Cup	Porsche 4.0 L Flat-6	912	(France) Jean-François Demorge	Am	2–4
(France) Porsche Lorient Racing	Porsche 992 GT3 Cup	Porsche 4.0 L Flat-6	912	(France) Frederic Lelievre	Am	2–4
(France) Porsche Lorient Racing	Porsche 992 GT3 Cup	Porsche 4.0 L Flat-6	912	(France) Philippe Polette	Am	2–4
(France) Porsche Lorient Racing	Porsche 992 GT3 Cup	Porsche 4.0 L Flat-6	912	(France) Gilles Blasco	Am	2
(France) Porsche Lorient Racing	Porsche 992 GT3 Cup	Porsche 4.0 L Flat-6	912	(France) Frédéric Ancel	Am	3–4
(France) Porsche Lorient Racing	Porsche 992 GT3 Cup	Porsche 4.0 L Flat-6	912	(France) Franck Dezoteux	Am	3
(Switzerland) Orchid Racing Team	Porsche 992 GT3 Cup	Porsche 4.0 L Flat-6	917	(France) Laurent Misbach	Am	2
(Switzerland) Orchid Racing Team	Porsche 992 GT3 Cup	Porsche 4.0 L Flat-6	917	(Switzerland) Fabio Spirgi	Am	2
(Switzerland) Orchid Racing Team	Porsche 992 GT3 Cup	Porsche 4.0 L Flat-6	917	(Switzerland) Frank Villiger	Am	2
(Switzerland) Orchid Racing Team	Porsche 992 GT3 Cup	Porsche 4.0 L Flat-6	917	(Switzerland) Loic Villiger	Am	2
(Germany) Huber Racing	Porsche 992 GT3 Cup	Porsche 4.0 L Flat-6	923	(Italy) Enrico Fulgenzi	Am	1
(Germany) Huber Racing	Porsche 992 GT3 Cup	Porsche 4.0 L Flat-6	923	(Germany) Matthias Hoffsümmer	Am	1
(Germany) Huber Racing	Porsche 992 GT3 Cup	Porsche 4.0 L Flat-6	923	(Germany) Laurin Heinrich	Am	1
(Germany) Huber Racing	Porsche 992 GT3 Cup	Porsche 4.0 L Flat-6	923	(Luxembourg) Gabriel Rindone	Am	1
(Germany) Huber Racing	Porsche 992 GT3 Cup	Porsche 4.0 L Flat-6	924	(Russia) Evgeny Kireev	Am	1
(Germany) Huber Racing	Porsche 992 GT3 Cup	Porsche 4.0 L Flat-6	924	(Russia) Merabi Mekvabishvili	Am	1
(Germany) Huber Racing	Porsche 992 GT3 Cup	Porsche 4.0 L Flat-6	924	(Germany) Hendrik Still	Am	1
(Germany) Huber Racing	Porsche 992 GT3 Cup	Porsche 4.0 L Flat-6	924	(Germany) Wolfgang Triller	Am	1
(Andorra) Three Sixty Racing Team	Porsche 992 GT3 Cup	Porsche 4.0 L Flat-6	926	(Brazil) Marcio Mauro	Am	6
(Andorra) Three Sixty Racing Team	Porsche 992 GT3 Cup	Porsche 4.0 L Flat-6	926	(Brazil) JP Mauro	Am	6
(Andorra) Three Sixty Racing Team	Porsche 992 GT3 Cup	Porsche 4.0 L Flat-6	926	(Brazil) Alan Hellmeister	Am	6
(Andorra) Three Sixty Racing Team	Porsche 992 GT3 Cup	Porsche 4.0 L Flat-6	926	(Brazil) Rafael Suzuki	Am	6
(Andorra) Three Sixty Racing Team	Porsche 992 GT3 Cup	Porsche 4.0 L Flat-6	926	(Brazil) Nelson Monteiro	Am	6
(Andorra) Three Sixty Racing Team	Porsche 992 GT3 Cup	Porsche 4.0 L Flat-6	927	(Brazil) Eduardo Menossi	Am	6
(Andorra) Three Sixty Racing Team	Porsche 992 GT3 Cup	Porsche 4.0 L Flat-6	927	(Brazil) Francisco Horta	Am	6
(Andorra) Three Sixty Racing Team	Porsche 992 GT3 Cup	Porsche 4.0 L Flat-6	927	(Brazil) Rouman Ziemkiewicz	Am	6
(Andorra) Three Sixty Racing Team	Porsche 992 GT3 Cup	Porsche 4.0 L Flat-6	927	(Brazil) Tom Filho	Am	6
(Andorra) Three Sixty Racing Team	Porsche 992 GT3 Cup	Porsche 4.0 L Flat-6	927	(Brazil) Georgis Frangulis	Am	6
(Germany) HRT Performance	Porsche 992 GT3 Cup	Porsche 4.0 L Flat-6	928	(Sweden) Erik Behrens	Am	1
(Germany) HRT Performance	Porsche 992 GT3 Cup	Porsche 4.0 L Flat-6	928	(Sweden) Tommy Gråberg	Am	1
(Germany) HRT Performance	Porsche 992 GT3 Cup	Porsche 4.0 L Flat-6	928	(Sweden) Hans Holmlund	Am	1
(Germany) HRT Performance	Porsche 992 GT3 Cup	Porsche 4.0 L Flat-6	928	(Sweden) Daniel Roos	Am	1
(Germany) HRT Performance	Porsche 992 GT3 Cup	Porsche 4.0 L Flat-6	928	(Netherlands) Gijs Bessem	Am	2–4, 6
(Germany) HRT Performance	Porsche 992 GT3 Cup	Porsche 4.0 L Flat-6	928	(Netherlands) Harry Hilders	Am	2–4
(Germany) HRT Performance	Porsche 992 GT3 Cup	Porsche 4.0 L Flat-6	928	(Netherlands) Bob Herber	Am	6
(Germany) HRT Performance	Porsche 992 GT3 Cup	Porsche 4.0 L Flat-6	928	(United Kingdom) JM Littman	Am	6
(Germany) HRT Performance	Porsche 992 GT3 Cup	Porsche 4.0 L Flat-6	928	(Estonia) Mirko van Oostrum	Am	6
(Germany) HRT Performance	Porsche 992 GT3 Cup	Porsche 4.0 L Flat-6	928	(Germany) Kim Andre Hauschild	Am	6
(Germany) HRT Performance	Porsche 992 GT3 Cup	Porsche 4.0 L Flat-6	929	(Sweden) Gustav Bergström	Am	1–2
(Germany) HRT Performance	Porsche 992 GT3 Cup	Porsche 4.0 L Flat-6	929	(Sweden) Emil Persson	Am	1
(Germany) HRT Performance	Porsche 992 GT3 Cup	Porsche 4.0 L Flat-6	929	(Sweden) Henric Skoog	Am	1
(Germany) HRT Performance	Porsche 992 GT3 Cup	Porsche 4.0 L Flat-6	929	(Sweden) Patrik Skoog	Am	1
(Germany) HRT Performance	Porsche 992 GT3 Cup	Porsche 4.0 L Flat-6	929	(Sweden) Johan Kristoffersson	Am	2
(Germany) HRT Performance	Porsche 992 GT3 Cup	Porsche 4.0 L Flat-6	929	(Norway) Ole Christian Veiby	Am	2
(Germany) HRT Performance	Porsche 992 GT3 Cup	Porsche 4.0 L Flat-6	929	(Finland) Antti Buri	Am	3
(Germany) HRT Performance	Porsche 992 GT3 Cup	Porsche 4.0 L Flat-6	929	(Finland) Kari-Pekka Laaksonen	Am	3
(Germany) HRT Performance	Porsche 992 GT3 Cup	Porsche 4.0 L Flat-6	929	(Finland) Jim Rautiainen	Am	3
(Germany) HRT Performance	Porsche 992 GT3 Cup	Porsche 4.0 L Flat-6	929	(Finland) Antti Buri	P	6
(Germany) HRT Performance	Porsche 992 GT3 Cup	Porsche 4.0 L Flat-6	929	(Finland) Kari-Pekka Laaksonen	P	6
(Germany) HRT Performance	Porsche 992 GT3 Cup	Porsche 4.0 L Flat-6	929	(Finland) Jim Rautiainen	P	6
(Germany) HRT Performance	Porsche 992 GT3 Cup	Porsche 4.0 L Flat-6	929	(Austria) Constantin Kletzer	P	6
(Germany) HRT Performance	Porsche 992 GT3 Cup	Porsche 4.0 L Flat-6	930	(Germany) Stefan Aust	Am	1
(Germany) HRT Performance	Porsche 992 GT3 Cup	Porsche 4.0 L Flat-6	930	(Russia) Nikolai Gadetskii	Am	1
(Germany) HRT Performance	Porsche 992 GT3 Cup	Porsche 4.0 L Flat-6	930	(Germany) Holger Harmsen	Am	1
(Germany) HRT Performance	Porsche 992 GT3 Cup	Porsche 4.0 L Flat-6	930	(United Kingdom) JM Littman	Am	1
(Germany) HRT Performance	Porsche 992 GT3 Cup	Porsche 4.0 L Flat-6	931	(Saudi Arabia) Saeed Al Mouri	Am	1
(Germany) HRT Performance	Porsche 992 GT3 Cup	Porsche 4.0 L Flat-6	931	(France) Michael Blanchemain	Am	1
(Germany) HRT Performance	Porsche 992 GT3 Cup	Porsche 4.0 L Flat-6	931	(Germany) Lars Dahmann	Am	1
(Germany) HRT Performance	Porsche 992 GT3 Cup	Porsche 4.0 L Flat-6	931	(France) Cyril Saleilles	Am	1
(Germany) HRT Performance	Porsche 992 GT3 Cup	Porsche 4.0 L Flat-6	931	(Australia) Marcel Zalloua	Am	1
(Netherlands) Team GP-Elite	Porsche 992 GT3 Cup	Porsche 4.0 L Flat-6	933	(Netherlands) Roger Hodenius	P	1
(Netherlands) Team GP-Elite	Porsche 992 GT3 Cup	Porsche 4.0 L Flat-6	933	(Netherlands) Steven van Rhee	P	1
(Netherlands) Team GP-Elite	Porsche 992 GT3 Cup	Porsche 4.0 L Flat-6	933	(Netherlands) Thierry Vermeulen	P	1
(Netherlands) Team GP-Elite	Porsche 992 GT3 Cup	Porsche 4.0 L Flat-6	933	(Netherlands) Larry ten Voorde	P	1
(Netherlands) Team GP-Elite	Porsche 992 GT3 Cup	Porsche 4.0 L Flat-6	934	(Netherlands) Lucas Groeneveld	P	1
(Netherlands) Team GP-Elite	Porsche 992 GT3 Cup	Porsche 4.0 L Flat-6	934	(Netherlands) Daan van Kuijk	P	1
(Netherlands) Team GP-Elite	Porsche 992 GT3 Cup	Porsche 4.0 L Flat-6	934	(Netherlands) Jesse van Kuijk	P	1
(Netherlands) Team GP-Elite	Porsche 992 GT3 Cup	Porsche 4.0 L Flat-6	934	(Netherlands) Max van Splunteren	P	1
(Germany) (United Arab Emirates) / ID Racing (Note: Cars No. 940 and 944 entered as ID Racing and car no. 977 RABDAN Motorsports by ID Racing.); (Germany) (United Arab Emirates) / RABDAN Motorsports by ID Racing	Porsche 992 GT3 Cup	Porsche 4.0 L Flat-6	940	(Lithuania) Audrius Butkevicius	P	1
(Germany) (United Arab Emirates) / ID Racing; (Germany) (United Arab Emirates) / RABDAN Motorsports by ID Racing	Porsche 992 GT3 Cup	Porsche 4.0 L Flat-6	940	(United States) Vincent Piemonte	P	1
(Germany) (United Arab Emirates) / ID Racing; (Germany) (United Arab Emirates) / RABDAN Motorsports by ID Racing	Porsche 992 GT3 Cup	Porsche 4.0 L Flat-6	940	(Switzerland) Adrian Spescha	P	1
(Germany) (United Arab Emirates) / ID Racing; (Germany) (United Arab Emirates) / RABDAN Motorsports by ID Racing	Porsche 992 GT3 Cup	Porsche 4.0 L Flat-6	940	(Hong Kong) Shaun Thong	P	1
(Germany) (United Arab Emirates) / ID Racing; (Germany) (United Arab Emirates) / RABDAN Motorsports by ID Racing	Porsche 992 GT3 Cup	Porsche 4.0 L Flat-6	944	(Kazakhstan) Alexandr Artemyev	P	1
(Germany) (United Arab Emirates) / ID Racing; (Germany) (United Arab Emirates) / RABDAN Motorsports by ID Racing	Porsche 992 GT3 Cup	Porsche 4.0 L Flat-6	944	(Finland) Jukka Honkavuori	P	1
(Germany) (United Arab Emirates) / ID Racing; (Germany) (United Arab Emirates) / RABDAN Motorsports by ID Racing	Porsche 992 GT3 Cup	Porsche 4.0 L Flat-6	944	(United Arab Emirates) Bashar Mardini	P	1
(Germany) (United Arab Emirates) / ID Racing; (Germany) (United Arab Emirates) / RABDAN Motorsports by ID Racing	Porsche 992 GT3 Cup	Porsche 4.0 L Flat-6	944	(Austria) Philipp Sager	P	1
(Germany) (United Arab Emirates) / ID Racing; (Germany) (United Arab Emirates) / RABDAN Motorsports by ID Racing	Porsche 992 GT3 Cup	Porsche 4.0 L Flat-6	944	(Austria) Christopher Zöchling	P	1
(Germany) (United Arab Emirates) / ID Racing; (Germany) (United Arab Emirates) / RABDAN Motorsports by ID Racing	Porsche 992 GT3 Cup	Porsche 4.0 L Flat-6	977	(United Arab Emirates) Saif Al Ameri	P	1, 6
(Germany) (United Arab Emirates) / ID Racing; (Germany) (United Arab Emirates) / RABDAN Motorsports by ID Racing	Porsche 992 GT3 Cup	Porsche 4.0 L Flat-6	977	(United Arab Emirates) Salem Al Ketbi	P	1
(Germany) (United Arab Emirates) / ID Racing; (Germany) (United Arab Emirates) / RABDAN Motorsports by ID Racing	Porsche 992 GT3 Cup	Porsche 4.0 L Flat-6	977	(United Arab Emirates) Helal Ali Mazrouei	P	1
(Germany) (United Arab Emirates) / ID Racing; (Germany) (United Arab Emirates) / RABDAN Motorsports by ID Racing	Porsche 992 GT3 Cup	Porsche 4.0 L Flat-6	977	(United Arab Emirates) Fahad Al Zaabi	P	1
(Germany) (United Arab Emirates) / ID Racing; (Germany) (United Arab Emirates) / RABDAN Motorsports by ID Racing	Porsche 992 GT3 Cup	Porsche 4.0 L Flat-6	977	(United Arab Emirates) Saeed Almheiri	P	1
(Germany) (United Arab Emirates) / ID Racing; (Germany) (United Arab Emirates) / RABDAN Motorsports by ID Racing	Porsche 992 GT3 Cup	Porsche 4.0 L Flat-6	977	(Netherlands) Thierry Vermeulen	P	6
(Germany) (United Arab Emirates) / ID Racing; (Germany) (United Arab Emirates) / RABDAN Motorsports by ID Racing	Porsche 992 GT3 Cup	Porsche 4.0 L Flat-6	977	(Italy) Enrico Fulgenzi	P	6
(Germany) (United Arab Emirates) / ID Racing; (Germany) (United Arab Emirates) / RABDAN Motorsports by ID Racing	Porsche 992 GT3 Cup	Porsche 4.0 L Flat-6	977	(Kyrgyzstan) Nikolai Gadetskii	P	6
(Spain) Baporo Motorsport	Porsche 992 GT3 Cup	Porsche 4.0 L Flat-6	951	(Spain) Manel Lao Cornago	Am	6
(Spain) Baporo Motorsport	Porsche 992 GT3 Cup	Porsche 4.0 L Flat-6	951	(Spain) Jaume Font	Am	6
(Spain) Baporo Motorsport	Porsche 992 GT3 Cup	Porsche 4.0 L Flat-6	951	(Spain) Daniel Diaz Varela	Am	6
(Spain) Baporo Motorsport	Porsche 992 GT3 Cup	Porsche 4.0 L Flat-6	951	(Spain) Guillem Pujeu	Am	6
(Switzerland) Fach Auto Tech	Porsche 992 GT3 Cup	Porsche 4.0 L Flat-6	961	(Switzerland) Alexander Fach	Am	1
(Switzerland) Fach Auto Tech	Porsche 992 GT3 Cup	Porsche 4.0 L Flat-6	961	(Switzerland) Dominik Fischli	Am	1
(Switzerland) Fach Auto Tech	Porsche 992 GT3 Cup	Porsche 4.0 L Flat-6	961	(Switzerland) Peter Hegglin	Am	1
(Switzerland) Fach Auto Tech	Porsche 992 GT3 Cup	Porsche 4.0 L Flat-6	961	(Switzerland) Jan Klingelnberg	Am	1
(Switzerland) Fach Auto Tech	Porsche 992 GT3 Cup	Porsche 4.0 L Flat-6	961	(Switzerland) Marcel Wagner	Am	1
(Switzerland) Fach Auto Tech	Porsche 992 GT3 Cup	Porsche 4.0 L Flat-6	962	(Brazil) Átila Abreu	P	1
(Switzerland) Fach Auto Tech	Porsche 992 GT3 Cup	Porsche 4.0 L Flat-6	962	(Brazil) Ayman Darwich	P	1
(Switzerland) Fach Auto Tech	Porsche 992 GT3 Cup	Porsche 4.0 L Flat-6	962	(Brazil) Eduardo Menossi	P	1
(Switzerland) Fach Auto Tech	Porsche 992 GT3 Cup	Porsche 4.0 L Flat-6	962	(Brazil) Leonardo Sanchez Secundino	P	1
(Switzerland) Fach Auto Tech	Porsche 992 GT3 Cup	Porsche 4.0 L Flat-6	962	(Brazil) Rouman Zimekiewicz	P	1
(Belgium) Speed Lover	Porsche 992 GT3 Cup	Porsche 4.0 L Flat-6	979	(Belgium) John de Wilde	Am	1, 3
(Belgium) Speed Lover	Porsche 992 GT3 Cup	Porsche 4.0 L Flat-6	979	(Belgium) Olivier Dons	Am	1, 3
(Belgium) Speed Lover	Porsche 992 GT3 Cup	Porsche 4.0 L Flat-6	979	(Belgium) Jean-Michel Gerome	Am	1
(Belgium) Speed Lover	Porsche 992 GT3 Cup	Porsche 4.0 L Flat-6	979	(France) Eric Mouez	Am	1
(Belgium) Speed Lover	Porsche 992 GT3 Cup	Porsche 4.0 L Flat-6	979	(Belgium) Brent Verheyen	Am	1
(Belgium) Speed Lover	Porsche 992 GT3 Cup	Porsche 4.0 L Flat-6	979	(United States) Dominique Bastien	Am	3
991
(Belgium) Red Ant Racing	Porsche 991 GT3 II Cup	Porsche 4.0 L Flat-6	903	(Belgium) Pieter Ooms	1	
(Belgium) Red Ant Racing	Porsche 991 GT3 II Cup	Porsche 4.0 L Flat-6	903	(Belgium) Glenn van Parijs	1	
(Belgium) Red Ant Racing	Porsche 991 GT3 II Cup	Porsche 4.0 L Flat-6	903	(Belgium) Ayrton Redant	1	
(Belgium) Red Ant Racing	Porsche 991 GT3 II Cup	Porsche 4.0 L Flat-6	903	(Belgium) Yannick Redant	1	
(Netherlands) Van Berlo Motorsport by Bas Koeten Racing	Porsche 991 GT3 II Cup	Porsche 4.0 L Flat-6	906	(Netherlands) Glenn van Berlo	3	
(Netherlands) Van Berlo Motorsport by Bas Koeten Racing	Porsche 991 GT3 II Cup	Porsche 4.0 L Flat-6	906	(Netherlands) Marcel van Berlo	3	
(Netherlands) Van Berlo Motorsport by Bas Koeten Racing	Porsche 991 GT3 II Cup	Porsche 4.0 L Flat-6	906	(Netherlands) Bart van Helden	3	
(Spain) E2P Racing	Porsche 991 GT3 II Cup	Porsche 4.0 L Flat-6	910	(Spain) Pablo Burguera	3, 6	
(Spain) E2P Racing	Porsche 991 GT3 II Cup	Porsche 4.0 L Flat-6	910	(Spain) Manuel Cintrano	3, 6	
(Spain) E2P Racing	Porsche 991 GT3 II Cup	Porsche 4.0 L Flat-6	910	(United Kingdom) Ben Clucas	3	
(Spain) E2P Racing	Porsche 991 GT3 II Cup	Porsche 4.0 L Flat-6	910	(Spain) Jaime Garcia	6	
(Spain) E2P Racing	Porsche 991 GT3 II Cup	Porsche 4.0 L Flat-6	910	(Spain) Antonio Sainero	6	
(Spain) E2P Racing	Porsche 991 GT3 II Cup	Porsche 4.0 L Flat-6	910	(Spain) Javier Morcillo	6	
(Romania) (Italy) / Willi Motorsport by Ebimotors (Note: Car No. 955 entered as Willi Motorsport by Ebimotors and cars No. 973 and No. 974 entered as Ebimotors.); (Romania) (Italy) / Ebimotors	Porsche 991 GT3 II Cup	Porsche 4.0 L Flat-6	955	(Italy) Fabrizio Broggi	1–2, 6	
(Romania) (Italy) / Willi Motorsport by Ebimotors; (Romania) (Italy) / Ebimotors	Porsche 991 GT3 II Cup	Porsche 4.0 L Flat-6	955	(Italy) Sabino de Castro	1–2, 6	
(Romania) (Italy) / Willi Motorsport by Ebimotors; (Romania) (Italy) / Ebimotors	Porsche 991 GT3 II Cup	Porsche 4.0 L Flat-6	955	(Romania) Sergiu Nicolae	1–2, 6	
(Romania) (Italy) / Willi Motorsport by Ebimotors; (Romania) (Italy) / Ebimotors	Porsche 991 GT3 II Cup	Porsche 4.0 L Flat-6	973	(Italy) Gianluca Giorgi	2	
(Romania) (Italy) / Willi Motorsport by Ebimotors; (Romania) (Italy) / Ebimotors	Porsche 991 GT3 II Cup	Porsche 4.0 L Flat-6	973	(Italy) Gianluigi Piccioli	2	
(Romania) (Italy) / Willi Motorsport by Ebimotors; (Romania) (Italy) / Ebimotors	Porsche 991 GT3 II Cup	Porsche 4.0 L Flat-6	973	(Italy) Paolo Venerosi	2	
(Romania) (Italy) / Willi Motorsport by Ebimotors; (Romania) (Italy) / Ebimotors	Porsche 991 GT3 II Cup	Porsche 4.0 L Flat-6	973	(Italy) 'Spezz'	2	
(Romania) (Italy) / Willi Motorsport by Ebimotors; (Romania) (Italy) / Ebimotors	Porsche 991 GT3 II Cup	Porsche 4.0 L Flat-6	974	(Italy) Massimiliano Donzelli	2	
(Romania) (Italy) / Willi Motorsport by Ebimotors; (Romania) (Italy) / Ebimotors	Porsche 991 GT3 II Cup	Porsche 4.0 L Flat-6	974	(Italy) Massimiliano Montagnese	2	
(Romania) (Italy) / Willi Motorsport by Ebimotors; (Romania) (Italy) / Ebimotors	Porsche 991 GT3 II Cup	Porsche 4.0 L Flat-6	974	(Italy) Pietro Negra	2	
(Romania) (Italy) / Willi Motorsport by Ebimotors; (Romania) (Italy) / Ebimotors	Porsche 991 GT3 II Cup	Porsche 4.0 L Flat-6	974	(Italy) Luigi Peroni	2	
(Netherlands) NKPP Racing by Bas Koeten Racing	Porsche 991 GT3 II Cup	Porsche 4.0 L Flat-6	991	(Netherlands) Gijs Bessem	1	
(Netherlands) NKPP Racing by Bas Koeten Racing	Porsche 991 GT3 II Cup	Porsche 4.0 L Flat-6	991	(Netherlands) Bob Herber	1	
(Netherlands) NKPP Racing by Bas Koeten Racing	Porsche 991 GT3 II Cup	Porsche 4.0 L Flat-6	991	(Netherlands) Harry Hilders	1	
(Netherlands) NKPP Racing by Bas Koeten Racing	Porsche 991 GT3 II Cup	Porsche 4.0 L Flat-6	991	(Netherlands) Daan Meijer	1	
GT4
(Sweden) ALFAB Racing	McLaren 570S GT4	McLaren 3.8 L Turbo V8	400	(Sweden) Erik Behrens	3	
(Sweden) ALFAB Racing	McLaren 570S GT4	McLaren 3.8 L Turbo V8	400	(Sweden) Daniel Roos	3	
(Germany) PROsport Performance AMR	Aston Martin Vantage AMR GT4	Aston Martin 4.0 L Turbo V8	401	(Belgium) Guido Dumarey	1	
(Germany) PROsport Performance AMR	Aston Martin Vantage AMR GT4	Aston Martin 4.0 L Turbo V8	401	(Belgium) Rodrigue Gillion	1	
(Germany) PROsport Performance AMR	Aston Martin Vantage AMR GT4	Aston Martin 4.0 L Turbo V8	401	(Germany) Mike David Ortmann	1	
(Germany) PROsport Performance AMR	Aston Martin Vantage AMR GT4	Aston Martin 4.0 L Turbo V8	401	(Germany) Hugo Sasse	1	
(Germany) PROsport Performance AMR	Aston Martin Vantage AMR GT4	Aston Martin 4.0 L Turbo V8	401	(Belgium) Nico Verdonck	1	
(South Korea) AtlasBX Motorsports	Mercedes-AMG GT4	Mercedes-AMG M178 4.0 L V8	403	(Netherlands) Roelof Bruins	1, 6	
(South Korea) AtlasBX Motorsports	Mercedes-AMG GT4	Mercedes-AMG M178 4.0 L V8	403	(Canada) Steven Cho	1, 6	
(South Korea) AtlasBX Motorsports	Mercedes-AMG GT4	Mercedes-AMG M178 4.0 L V8	403	(South Korea) Jong Kyum Kim	1, 6	
(South Korea) AtlasBX Motorsports	Mercedes-AMG GT4	Mercedes-AMG M178 4.0 L V8	403	(South Korea) Yong Hyeok Yang	1	
(South Korea) AtlasBX Motorsports	Mercedes-AMG GT4	Mercedes-AMG M178 4.0 L V8	403	(South Korea) Taekeun Yang	6	
(South Korea) AtlasBX Motorsports	Mercedes-AMG GT4	Mercedes-AMG M178 4.0 L V8	403	(South Korea) Ha Tae Young	6	
(Finland) Westend Racing	Porsche 718 Cayman GT4 Clubsport	Porsche 3.8 L Flat-6	404	(Finland) Markus Palttala	3	
(Finland) Westend Racing	Porsche 718 Cayman GT4 Clubsport	Porsche 3.8 L Flat-6	404	(Finland) Jorma Vanhanen	3	
(Finland) Westend Racing	Porsche 718 Cayman GT4 Clubsport	Porsche 3.8 L Flat-6	404	(Finland) Mattias Wrede	3	
(United Arab Emirates) Dragon Racing	Mercedes-AMG GT4	Mercedes-AMG M178 4.0 L V8	408	(Germany) Oliver Goethe	1	
(United Arab Emirates) Dragon Racing	Mercedes-AMG GT4	Mercedes-AMG M178 4.0 L V8	408	(Germany) Roald Goethe	1	
(United Arab Emirates) Dragon Racing	Mercedes-AMG GT4	Mercedes-AMG M178 4.0 L V8	408	(South Africa) Jordan Grogor	1	
(United Arab Emirates) Dragon Racing	Mercedes-AMG GT4	Mercedes-AMG M178 4.0 L V8	408	(United Kingdom) Stuart Hall	1	
(Germany) Heide Motorsport	Audi R8 LMS GT4 Evo	Audi 5.2 L V10	411	(United States) Cabell Fisher	1	
(Germany) Heide Motorsport	Audi R8 LMS GT4 Evo	Audi 5.2 L V10	411	(Germany) Sophie Hofmann	1	
(Germany) Heide Motorsport	Audi R8 LMS GT4 Evo	Audi 5.2 L V10	411	(Germany) Ulrich Kainzinger	1	
(Germany) Heide Motorsport	Audi R8 LMS GT4 Evo	Audi 5.2 L V10	411	(Germany) Daniel Karl	1	
(Germany) Heide Motorsport	Audi R8 LMS GT4 Evo	Audi 5.2 L V10	411	(Germany) Heinz Schmersal	1	
(Liechtenstein) Maniack-Racing	Mercedes-AMG GT4	Mercedes-AMG M178 4.0 L V8	412	(Liechtenstein) Martin Wachter	4	
(Liechtenstein) Maniack-Racing	Mercedes-AMG GT4	Mercedes-AMG M178 4.0 L V8	412	(Liechtenstein) Dario Pergolini	4	
(Liechtenstein) Maniack-Racing	Mercedes-AMG GT4	Mercedes-AMG M178 4.0 L V8	412	(Austria) Constantin Kletzer	4	
(Denmark) Jönsson consult / eva solo	Mercedes-AMG GT4	Mercedes-AMG M178 4.0 L V8	415	(Denmark) Claus Bertelsen	1	
(Denmark) Jönsson consult / eva solo	Mercedes-AMG GT4	Mercedes-AMG M178 4.0 L V8	415	(Denmark) Henrik Bollerslev	1	
(Denmark) Jönsson consult / eva solo	Mercedes-AMG GT4	Mercedes-AMG M178 4.0 L V8	415	(Denmark) Jan Engelbrecht	1	
(Denmark) Jönsson consult / eva solo	Mercedes-AMG GT4	Mercedes-AMG M178 4.0 L V8	415	(Denmark) Søren Jönsson	1	
(United Arab Emirates) Buggyra Racing	Mercedes-AMG GT4	Mercedes-AMG M178 4.0 L V8	416	(United Arab Emirates) Aliyyah Koloc	3	
(United Arab Emirates) Buggyra Racing	Mercedes-AMG GT4	Mercedes-AMG M178 4.0 L V8	416	(United Arab Emirates) Yasmeen Koloc	3	
(United Arab Emirates) Buggyra Racing	Mercedes-AMG GT4	Mercedes-AMG M178 4.0 L V8	416	(Czech Republic) Adam Lacko	3	
(Switzerland) Orchid Racing Team	Porsche 718 Cayman GT4 Clubsport	Porsche 3.8 L Flat-6	417	(France) Stefan Chaligne	2	
(Switzerland) Orchid Racing Team	Porsche 718 Cayman GT4 Clubsport	Porsche 3.8 L Flat-6	417	(Spain) Antonio Garzon	2	
(Switzerland) Orchid Racing Team	Porsche 718 Cayman GT4 Clubsport	Porsche 3.8 L Flat-6	417	(France) Antoine Leclerc	2	
(Switzerland) Orchid Racing Team	Porsche 718 Cayman GT4 Clubsport	Porsche 3.8 L Flat-6	417	(Switzerland) Alexandre Mottet	2	
(Belgium) Team ACP-Tangerine Associates by VEIDEC JJ Motorsport	BMW M4 GT4	BMW N55 3.0 L Twin-Turbo I6	421	(United States) Catesby Jones	2–3, 5–6	
(Belgium) Team ACP-Tangerine Associates by VEIDEC JJ Motorsport	BMW M4 GT4	BMW N55 3.0 L Twin-Turbo I6	421	(Belgium) Wim Spinoy	2–3, 5–6	
(Belgium) Team ACP-Tangerine Associates by VEIDEC JJ Motorsport	BMW M4 GT4	BMW N55 3.0 L Twin-Turbo I6	421	(United States) Steven Thomas	3	
(Belgium) Veidec Racing by JJ Motorsport	BMW M4 GT4	BMW N55 3.0 L Twin-Turbo I6	422	(Belgium) Arthur Peters	3	
(Belgium) Veidec Racing by JJ Motorsport	BMW M4 GT4	BMW N55 3.0 L Twin-Turbo I6	422	(Belgium) Hakan Sari	3	
(Belgium) Veidec Racing by JJ Motorsport	BMW M4 GT4	BMW N55 3.0 L Twin-Turbo I6	422	(Belgium) Recep Sari	3	
(United States) Heart of Racing Team	Aston Martin Vantage AMR GT4	Aston Martin 4.0 L Turbo V8	423	(Canada) Roman De Angelis	1	
(United States) Heart of Racing Team	Aston Martin Vantage AMR GT4	Aston Martin 4.0 L Turbo V8	423	(United Kingdom) Ian James	1	
(United States) Heart of Racing Team	Aston Martin Vantage AMR GT4	Aston Martin 4.0 L Turbo V8	423	(United States) Gray Newell	1	
(United States) Heart of Racing Team	Aston Martin Vantage AMR GT4	Aston Martin 4.0 L Turbo V8	423	(Spain) Alex Riberas	1	
(United Kingdom) (United States) / Century Motorsport (Note: Cars No. 429 entered as Century Motorsport and car no. 450 entered as RHC Jorgensen-Strom by Century.); (United Kingdom) (United States) / RHC Jorgensen-Strom by Century	BMW M4 GT4	BMW N55 3.0 L Twin-Turbo I6	429	(Russia) Alexander Bukhanstov	1	
(United Kingdom) (United States) / Century Motorsport; (United Kingdom) (United States) / RHC Jorgensen-Strom by Century	BMW M4 GT4	BMW N55 3.0 L Twin-Turbo I6	429	(United Kingdom) Andrew Gordon-Colebrooke	1	
(United Kingdom) (United States) / Century Motorsport; (United Kingdom) (United States) / RHC Jorgensen-Strom by Century	BMW M4 GT4	BMW N55 3.0 L Twin-Turbo I6	429	(United Kingdom) George King	1	
(United Kingdom) (United States) / Century Motorsport; (United Kingdom) (United States) / RHC Jorgensen-Strom by Century	BMW M4 GT4	BMW N55 3.0 L Twin-Turbo I6	429	(United Kingdom) James Winslow	1	
(United Kingdom) (United States) / Century Motorsport; (United Kingdom) (United States) / RHC Jorgensen-Strom by Century	BMW M4 GT4	BMW N55 3.0 L Twin-Turbo I6	450	(Netherlands) Danny van Dongen	1	
(United Kingdom) (United States) / Century Motorsport; (United Kingdom) (United States) / RHC Jorgensen-Strom by Century	BMW M4 GT4	BMW N55 3.0 L Twin-Turbo I6	450	(United Kingdom) Nathan Freke	1	
(United Kingdom) (United States) / Century Motorsport; (United Kingdom) (United States) / RHC Jorgensen-Strom by Century	BMW M4 GT4	BMW N55 3.0 L Twin-Turbo I6	450	(United States) Daren Jorgensen	1	
(United Kingdom) (United States) / Century Motorsport; (United Kingdom) (United States) / RHC Jorgensen-Strom by Century	BMW M4 GT4	BMW N55 3.0 L Twin-Turbo I6	450	(United States) Brett Strom	1	
(Czech Republic) Senkyr Motorsport	BMW M4 GT4	BMW N55 3.0 L Twin-Turbo I6	444	(Slovakia) Samuel Vetrak	6	
(Czech Republic) Senkyr Motorsport	BMW M4 GT4	BMW N55 3.0 L Twin-Turbo I6	444	(Slovakia) Marian Biz	6	
(Czech Republic) Senkyr Motorsport	BMW M4 GT4	BMW N55 3.0 L Twin-Turbo I6	444	(Czech Republic) Petr Svantner	6	
(Czech Republic) Senkyr Motorsport	BMW M4 GT4	BMW N55 3.0 L Twin-Turbo I6	444	(Czech Republic) Ladislav Smucr	6	
(Czech Republic) Senkyr Motorsport	BMW M4 GT4	BMW N55 3.0 L Twin-Turbo I6	444	(Slovakia) Richard Gonda	6	
(Germany) Team Avia Sorg Rennsport	BMW M4 GT4	BMW N55 3.0 L Twin-Turbo I6	451	(Germany) Stefan Beyer	1	
(Germany) Team Avia Sorg Rennsport	BMW M4 GT4	BMW N55 3.0 L Twin-Turbo I6	451	(Germany) Stephan Epp	1	
(Germany) Team Avia Sorg Rennsport	BMW M4 GT4	BMW N55 3.0 L Twin-Turbo I6	451	(Germany) Olaf Meyer	1	
(Germany) Team Avia Sorg Rennsport	BMW M4 GT4	BMW N55 3.0 L Twin-Turbo I6	451	(Denmark) Michael Nielsen	1	
(Germany) Team Avia Sorg Rennsport	BMW M4 GT4	BMW N55 3.0 L Twin-Turbo I6	451	(Germany) Björn Simon	1	
(Germany) Team Avia Sorg Rennsport	BMW M4 GT4	BMW N55 3.0 L Twin-Turbo I6	452	(United Arab Emirates) Ahmed Al Melaihi	1	
(Germany) Team Avia Sorg Rennsport	BMW M4 GT4	BMW N55 3.0 L Twin-Turbo I6	452	(Ukraine) Dmytro Ryzhak	1	
(Germany) Team Avia Sorg Rennsport	BMW M4 GT4	BMW N55 3.0 L Twin-Turbo I6	452	(Mexico) Francisco Sapien	1	
(Germany) Team Avia Sorg Rennsport	BMW M4 GT4	BMW N55 3.0 L Twin-Turbo I6	452	(Mexico) Benito Tagle	1	
(Germany) Team Avia Sorg Rennsport	BMW M4 GT4	BMW N55 3.0 L Twin-Turbo I6	452	(Germany) Hans Joachim Theiss	1	
(United Kingdom) CWS Engineering	Ginetta G56 GT4	GM LS3 6.2 L V8	478	(United Kingdom) Mike Simpson	1, 3	
(United Kingdom) CWS Engineering	Ginetta G56 GT4	GM LS3 6.2 L V8	478	(United Kingdom) Colin White	1, 3	
(United Kingdom) CWS Engineering	Ginetta G56 GT4	GM LS3 6.2 L V8	478	(United Kingdom) Lawrence Tomlinson	1	
(United Kingdom) CWS Engineering	Ginetta G56 GT4	GM LS3 6.2 L V8	478	(United Kingdom) James Jakes	1	
(United Kingdom) CWS Engineering	Ginetta G56 GT4	GM LS3 6.2 L V8	478	(United Kingdom) Freddie Tomlinson	3	
(Germany) Car Collection Motorsport	Audi R8 LMS GT4 Evo	Audi 5.2 L V10	499	(Norway) Andreas Bakkerud	3, 5	
(Germany) Car Collection Motorsport	Audi R8 LMS GT4 Evo	Audi 5.2 L V10	499	(United States) José Garcia	3, 5	
(Germany) Car Collection Motorsport	Audi R8 LMS GT4 Evo	Audi 5.2 L V10	499	(Germany) Patrick Kolb	3, 5	
Iberian Supercars Endurance Series (First 2 Hours Only)
(Slovenia) Lema Racing	Mercedes-AMG GT4	Mercedes-AMG M178 4.0 L V8	802	(Portugal) Manuel Gião	6	
(Slovenia) Lema Racing	Mercedes-AMG GT4	Mercedes-AMG M178 4.0 L V8	802	(Finland) Elias Niskanen	6	
(Portugal) Araújo Competição	McLaren 570S GT4 Trophy	McLaren 3.8 L Turbo V8	803	(United States) Fred Block	6	
(Portugal) Araújo Competição	McLaren 570S GT4 Trophy	McLaren 3.8 L Turbo V8	803	(Portugal) Alvaro Ramos	6	
(Portugal) Araújo Competição	McLaren 570S GT4	McLaren 3.8 L Turbo V8	888	(Portugal) Francisco Carvalho	6	
(Portugal) Araújo Competição	McLaren 570S GT4	McLaren 3.8 L Turbo V8	888	(Portugal) Miguel Cristóvão	6	
(United Kingdom) JOTA Motorsport	Ginetta G50 GT4	Ford Cyclone 3.5L V6	813	(Spain) Juan Carlos Arias	6	
(United Kingdom) JOTA Motorsport	Ginetta G50 GT4	Ford Cyclone 3.5L V6	813	(United Kingdom) Tom Seldon	6	
(Spain) SMC Motorsport	McLaren 570S GT4	McLaren 3.8 L Turbo V8	819	(Spain) Gonzalo de Andrés	6	
(Spain) SMC Motorsport	McLaren 570S GT4	McLaren 3.8 L Turbo V8	819	(Spain) Fernando Navarrete	6	
(Spain) SMC Motorsport	McLaren 570S GT4	McLaren 3.8 L Turbo V8	877	(Spain) Guillermo Aso	6	
(Spain) SMC Motorsport	McLaren 570S GT4	McLaren 3.8 L Turbo V8	877	(Spain) Tomás Pintos	6	
(Portugal) Garagem João Gomes	Porsche Cayman GT4 Clubsport MR	Porsche 3.8L flat-6	881	(Spain) Quique Bordas	6	
(Portugal) Garagem João Gomes	Porsche Cayman GT4 Clubsport MR	Porsche 3.8L flat-6	881	(Portugal) João Carvalhosa	6	
(Spain) Pro GT	Porsche Cayman GT4 Clubsport MR	Porsche 3.8L flat-6	890	(Lithuania) Andrius Zemaitis	6	

GT3 entries
Icon	Class
P	GT3-Pro
PA	GT3-Pro Am
Am	GT3-Am
992 entries
Icon	Class
P	992-Pro
Am	992-Am

== Race results ==
Bold indicates overall winner.

Event	Circuit	GT3-Pro Winners	GT3-Pro Am Winners	GT3-Am Winners	GTX Winners	992 Winners	992-AM Winners	991 Winners	GT4 Winners	ISE Winners	Report
1	(United Arab Emirates) Dubai Autodrome	**(Saudi Arabia) No. 7 MS7 by WRT**	(Netherlands) No. 19 MP Motorsport	(United States) No. 85 CP Racing	(Belgium) No. 704 PK Carsport	(Netherlands) No. 934 Team GP-Elite	(Germany) No. 929 HRT Performance	(Netherlands) No. 991 NKPP by Bas Koeten Racing	(United Arab Emirates) No. 408 Dragon Racing	No Entrants	Report
1	(United Arab Emirates) Dubai Autodrome	**(Zimbabwe) Axcil Jefferies** **(Germany) Christopher Mies** **(France) Thomas Neubauer** **(Saudi Arabia) Mohammed Saud Fahad Al Saud** **(Belgium) Dries Vanthoor**	(Netherlands) Bert de Heus (Netherlands) Daniël de Jong (Netherlands) Henk de Jong (Netherlands) Jaap van Lagen	(United States) Charles Espenlaub (United States) Shane Lewis (United States) Charles Putman (United Kingdom) Phil Quaife	(Belgium) Peter Guelinckx (Belgium) Bert Longin (Belgium) Stienes Longin (Belgium) Stijn Lowette	(Netherlands) Lucas Groeneveld (Netherlands) Daan van Kuijk (Netherlands) Jesse van Kuijk (Netherlands) Max van Splunteren	(Sweden) Henric Skoog (Sweden) Patrik Skoog (Sweden) Emil Persson (Sweden) Gustav Bergström	(Netherlands) Gijs Bessem (Netherlands) Bob Herber (Netherlands) Harry Hilders (Netherlands) Daan Meijer	(Germany) Oliver Goethe (Germany) Roald Goethe (South Africa) Jordan Grogor (United Kingdom) Stuart Hall	No Entrants	Report
2	(Italy) Mugello	(Lithuania) No. 71 Juta Racing	**(Canada) No. 1 ST Racing**	(Germany) No. 25 MANN-FILTER Team Landgraf	(Germany) No. 728 HRT Performance	(Netherlands) No. 909 Red Camel-Jordans.nl		(Italy) No. 973 Ebimotors	(Belgium) No. 421 Team ACP-Tangerine by VEIDEC JJ Mpst	No Entrants	Report
2	(Italy) Mugello	(Lithuania) Julius Adomavičius (Lithuania) Andrius Gelžinis (Lithuania) Jonas Gelžinis	**(United States) Bryson Morris** **(Canada) Samantha Tan** **(Canada) Nick Wittmer**	(Austria) Alexander Hrachowina (Austria) Martin Konrad (Germany) Bernd Schneider	(United States) Jean-Francois Brunot (China) Kerong Li	(Netherlands) Ivo Breukers (Netherlands) Luc Breukers (Netherlands) Rik Breukers		(Italy) Gianluca Giorgi (Italy) Gianluigi Piccioli (Italy) Paolo Venerosi (Italy) 'Spezz'	(United States) Catesby Jones (Belgium) Wim Spinoy	No Entrants	Report
3	(Belgium) Spa-Francorchamps	(Lithuania) No. 71 Juta Racing	(Germany) **No. 18 Phoenix Racing**	(United States) No. 85 CP Racing	(Germany) No. 719 9und11 Racing	(Netherlands) No. 909 Red Camel-Jordans.nl	(Belgium) No. 903 Red Ant Racing	(Netherlands) No. 906 Van Berlo Motorsport by Bas Koeten Racing	(Belgium) No. 421 Team ACP-Tangerine by VEIDEC JJ Mpst	No Entrants	Report
4	(Germany) Hockenheimring	(Lithuania) No. 71 Juta Racing	(Germany) **No. 18 Phoenix Racing**	(Germany) No. 34 Car Collection Motorsport	(Spain) No. 910 E2P Racing	(Netherlands) No. 909 Red Camel-Jordans.nl	No Entrants	No Entrants	(Liechtenstein) No. 412 Maniack-Racing	No Entrants	Report
5	(Portugal) Algarve	N/A	(Germany) No. 18 Phoenix Racing	(United States) **No. 85 CP Racing**	(Germany) No. 710 Leipert Motorsport	(Belgium) No. 903 Red Ant Racing	No Entrants	No Entrants	(United Kingdom) No. 405 RAM Racing	No Entrants	Report
6	(Spain) Barcelona	(Germany) **No. 22 WTM Racing**	(Germany) No. 18 Phoenix Racing	(United States) No. 85 CP Racing	(Germany) No. 710 Leipert Motorsport	(Belgium) No. 903 Red Ant Racing	No Entrants	(Italy) No. 955 Willi Motorsport by Ebimotors	(South Korea) AtlasBX Motorsports	(Slovenia) No. 802 Lema Racing	Report
6	(Spain) Barcelona									(Portugal) Manuel Gião (Finland) Elias Niskanen	Report
7	Kuwait Motor Town									No Entrants	Report

== Championship standings ==
=== Continents GT3 Drivers' ===
Pos.	Drivers	Team	(United Arab Emirates) DUB		TBA	TBA		Pts.
Pos.	Drivers	Team	12hrs	24hrs	TBA	12hrs	24hrs	Pts.
1	(Zimbabwe) Axcil Jefferies (Germany) Christopher Mies (France) Thomas Neubauer (Saudi Arabia) Mohammed Saud Fahad Al Saud (Belgium) Dries Vanthoor	(Saudi Arabia) No. 7 MS7 by WRT	2^{P}	1^{P}				30
2	(Monaco) Benjamin Goethe (France) Arnold Robin (France) Jean-Baptiste Simmenauer (Belgium) Frédéric Vervisch	(Belgium) No. 31 Team WRT	1	2				29
3	(United Arab Emirates) Khaled Al Qubaisi (Germany) Hubert Haupt (Switzerland) Raffaele Marciello (Germany) Manuel Metzger	(Germany) No. 4 Mercedes-AMG Team HRT Bilstein	3	4				25
4	(Germany) Maro Engel (France) Jules Gounon (Canada) Mikaël Grenier (Australia) Kenny Habul	(Australia) No. 75 SunEnergy1 by SPS automotive performance	5	3				24
5	(Oman) Al Faisal Al Zubair (Netherlands) Indy Dontje (Austria) Martin Konrad (Germany) Luca Stolz	(Oman) No. 777 AL Manar Racing by HRT	4	5				23
6	(Australia) Brenton Grove (Australia) Stephen Grove (Germany) Sven Müller (Australia) Anton de Pasquale	(Australia) No. 92 Grove Motorsport by Herberth Motorsport	7	6				19
7	(United States) Charles Espenlaub (United States) Joe Foster (United States) Charles Putman (United Kingdom) Phil Quaife	(United States) No. 85 CP Racing	9	8				16
7	(Germany) Alex Aka (Germany) Luca Engstler (United Kingdom) Finlay Hutchison (Austria) Nicolas Schöll (Germany) Florian Scholze	(Germany) No. 99 Attempto Racing	11	7				16
8	(Netherlands) Bert de Heus (Netherlands) Daniël de Jong (Netherlands) Henk de Jong (Netherlands) Jaap van Lagen	(Netherlands) No. 19 MP Motorsport	8	10				14
9	(Saudi Arabia) Reema Juffali (United States) George Kurtz (United Kingdom) Ian Loggie (Germany) Valentin Pierburg	(Germany) No. 20 SPS automotive performance	10	9				13
10	(France) Maxime Robin	(Belgium) No. 31 Team WRT	1	2				19
Pos.	Drivers	Team	(United Arab Emirates) DUB		TBA	TBA		Pts.

Colour	Result
Gold	Winner
Silver	Second place
Bronze	Third place
Green	Points classification
Blue	Non-points classification
Blue	Non-classified finish (NC)
Purple	Retired, not classified (Ret)
Red	Did not qualify (DNQ)
Red	Did not pre-qualify (DNPQ)
Black	Disqualified (DSQ)
White	Did not start (DNS)
White	Withdrew (WD)
White	Race cancelled (C)
Blank	Did not practice (DNP)
Blank	Did not arrive (DNA)
Blank	Excluded (EX)

**Bold** – Pole
Italics – Fastest Lap

† – Drivers did not finish the race, but were classified as they completed over 50% of the class winner's race distance.

=== Continents GT3 Teams' ===
Pos.	Team	(United Arab Emirates) DUB		TBA	TBA		Pts.
Pos.	Team	12hrs	24hrs	TBA	12hrs	24hrs	Pts.
1	(Saudi Arabia) No. 7 MS7 by WRT	2^{P}	1^{P}				30
2	(Belgium) No. 31 Team WRT	1	2				29
3	(Germany) No. 4 Mercedes-AMG Team HRT Bilstein	3	4				25
4	(Australia) No. 75 SunEnergy1 by SPS automotive performance	5	3				24
5	(Oman) No. 777 AL Manar Racing by HRT	4	5				23
6	(Australia) No. 92 Grove Motorsport by Herberth Motorsport	7	6				19
7	(United States) No. 85 CP Racing	9	8				16
7	(Germany) No. 99 Attempto Racing	11	7				16
8	(Netherlands) No. 19 MP Motorsport	8	10				14
9	(Germany) No. 20 SPS automotive performance	10	9				13
10	(Germany) No. 27 Team Joos Sportwagentechnik	14	11				9
Pos.	Team	(United Arab Emirates) DUB		TBA	TBA		Pts.

† – Drivers did not finish the race, but were classified as they completed over 50% of the class winner's race distance.

=== Continents GT3 Pro-Am Drivers' ===
Pos.	Drivers	Team	(United Arab Emirates) DUB		TBA	TBA		Pts.
Pos.	Drivers	Team	12hrs	24hrs	TBA	12hrs	24hrs	Pts.
1	(Netherlands) Bert de Heus (Netherlands) Daniël de Jong (Netherlands) Henk de Jong (Netherlands) Jaap van Lagen	(Netherlands) No. 19 MP Motorsport	8^{P}	10^{PF}				29
2	(Russia) Andrey Mukovoz (Russia) Sergey Peregudov (Luxembourg) Dylan Pereira (Russia) Stanislav Sidoruk	(Luxembourg) No. 93 DUWO Racing by Herberth Motorsport	12	12				25
3	(Germany) Friedel Bleifuss (Germany) Jannes Fittje (Germany) Steffen Görig (Germany) Michael Joos	(Germany) No. 27 Team Joos Sportwagentechnik	14^{F}	11				25
4	(United States) Harry Gottsacker (United States) Anthony Lazzaro (United States) Tyler Maxson (United States) Bryson Morris (Canada) Samantha Tan	(Canada) No. 1 ST Racing	13	25				20
4	(France) Emmanuel Collard (France) François Perrodo (France) Charles-Henri Samani (France) Matthieu Vaxivière	(France) No. 83 Racetivity	15	17				20
	(Switzerland) Daniel Allemann (Germany) Ralf Bohn (Germany) Alfred Renauer (Germany) Robert Renauer	(Germany) No. 91 Herberth Motorsport	WD	WD				
Pos.	Drivers	Team	(United Arab Emirates) DUB		TBA	TBA		Pts.

† – Drivers did not finish the race, but were classified as they completed over 50% of the class winner's race distance.

=== Continents GT3 Pro-Am Drivers' ===
Pos.	Team	(United Arab Emirates) DUB		TBA	TBA		Pts.
Pos.	Team	12hrs	24hrs	TBA	12hrs	24hrs	Pts.
1	(Netherlands) No. 19 MP Motorsport	8^{P}	10^{PF}				29
2	(Luxembourg) No. 93 DUWO Racing by Herberth Motorsport	12	12				25
3	(Germany) No. 27 Team Joos Sportwagentechnik	14^{F}	11				25
4	(Canada) No. 1 ST Racing	13	25				20
4	(France) No. 83 Racetivity	15	17				20
	(Germany) No. 91 Herberth Motorsport	WD	WD				
Pos.	Team	(United Arab Emirates) DUB		TBA	TBA		Pts.

† – Drivers did not finish the race, but were classified as they completed over 50% of the class winner's race distance.

=== Continents GT3 Am Drivers' ===
Pos.	Drivers	Team	(United Arab Emirates) DUB		TBA	TBA		Pts.
Pos.	Drivers	Team	12hrs	24hrs	TBA	12hrs	24hrs	Pts.
1	(United States) Charles Espenlaub (United States) Joe Foster (United States) Charles Putman (United Kingdom) Phil Quaife	(United States) No. 85 CP Racing	9^{P}	8^{P}				29
2	(Saudi Arabia) Reema Juffali (United States) George Kurtz (United Kingdom) Ian Loggie (Germany) Valentin Pierburg	(Germany) No. 20 SPS automotive performance	10	9				25
3	(Germany) Gustav Edelhoff (Germany) Max Edelhoff (Germany) Elmar Grimm (Germany) Johannes Dr. Kirchhoff (Germany) Ingo Vogler	(Germany) No. 34 Car Collection Motorsport	20	13				25
4	(Russia) Denis Remenyako (Russia) Victor Shaytar (Russia) Sergey Stolyarov	(Russia) No. 13 CapitalRT-Yadro	18	15				22
5	(United Kingdom) Tom Jackson (Slovakia) Mat'o Konôpka (Slovakia) Miro Konôpka (Poland) Andrzej Lewandowski (Slovakia) Zdeno Mikulasko	(Slovakia) No. 44 ARC Bratislava	25	18				16
6	(Belgium) Simon Balcaen (Belgium) Guillaume Dumarey (Belgium) Maxime Dumarey (Belgium) Jean Glorieux	(Germany) No. 39 PROsport Performance AMR	22	32				14
7	(France) Olivier Esteves (France) Simon Gachet (Luxembourg) Christian Keldersn (Belgium) Pierre-Yves Paque	(France) No. 26 Saintéloc Racing	28^{F}	19^{F}				13
8	(Armenia) Artur Goroyan (Germany) Patrick Kolb (Germany) Martin Lechmann (Russia) Roman Mavlanov (Germany) Jörg Viebahn	(Germany) No. 3 Car Collection Motorsport	23	34				11
9	(Russia) Dmitry Gvazava	(Russia) No. 13 CapitalRT-Yadro	18	15				8
10	(Oman) Ahmad Al Harthy (United Arab Emirates) Nabil Moutran (United Arab Emirates) Ramzi Moutran (United Arab Emirates) Sami Moutran	(United Kingdom) No. 95 Duel Racing with TF Sport	69	58				6
Pos.	Drivers	Team	(United Arab Emirates) DUB		TBA	TBA		Pts.

† – Drivers did not finish the race, but were classified as they completed over 50% of the class winner's race distance.

=== Continents GT3 Am Teams' ===
Pos.	Team	(United Arab Emirates) DUB		TBA	TBA		Pts.
Pos.	Team	12hrs	24hrs	TBA	12hrs	24hrs	Pts.
1	(United States) No. 85 CP Racing	9^{P}	8^{P}				29
2	(Germany) No. 20 SPS automotive performance	10	9				25
3	(Germany) No. 34 Car Collection Motorsport	20	13				25
4	(Russia) No. 13 CapitalRT-Yadro	18	15				22
5	(Slovakia) No. 44 ARC Bratislava	25	18				16
6	(Germany) No. 39 PROsport Performance AMR	22	32				14
7	(France) No. 26 Saintéloc Racing	28^{F}	19^{F}				13
8	(Germany) No. 3 Car Collection Motorsport	23	34				11
9	(United Kingdom) No. 95 Duel Racing with TF Sport	69	58				6
Pos.	Team	(United Arab Emirates) DUB		TBA	TBA		Pts.

† – Drivers did not finish the race, but were classified as they completed over 50% of the class winner's race distance.

=== Continents GTX Drivers' ===
Pos.	Drivers	Team	(United Arab Emirates) DUB		TBA	TBA		Pts.
Pos.	Drivers	Team	12hrs	24hrs	TBA	12hrs	24hrs	Pts.
1	(Belgium) Peter Guelinckx (Belgium) Bert Longin (Belgium) Stienes Longin (Belgium) Stijn Lowette	(Belgium) No. 704 PK Carsport	27	24				27
2	(United States) Erik Davis (United States) Gregg Gorski (Germany) Fidel Leib (United States) Gerhard Watzinger (France) Alban Varutti	(Germany) No. 710 Leipert Motorsport	32^{PF}	39^{PF}				23
3	(France) Lionel Amrouche (France) Philippe Bonnel (France) Cyril Calmon (France) Sebastien Lajoux	(France) No. 701 Vortex V8	70	70				25
4	(Austria) Daniel Drexel (Austria) Andreas Höfler (Austria) Dominik Olbert (Austria) Kevin Raith (Austria) Robert Schiftner	(Austria) No. 714 Razoon - More than Racing	72	Ret				4
Pos.	Drivers	Team	(United Arab Emirates) DUB		TBA	TBA		Pts.

† – Drivers did not finish the race, but were classified as they completed over 50% of the class winner's race distance.

=== Continents GTX Teams' ===
Pos.	Team	(United Arab Emirates) DUB		TBA	TBA		Pts.
Pos.	Team	12hrs	24hrs	TBA	12hrs	24hrs	Pts.
1	(Belgium) No. 704 PK Carsport	27	24				27
2	(Germany) No. 710 Leipert Motorsport	32^{PF}	39^{PF}				23
3	(France) No. 701 Vortex V8	70	70				25
4	(Austria) No. 714 Razoon - More than Racing	72	Ret				4
Pos.	Team	(United Arab Emirates) DUB		TBA	TBA		Pts.

† – Drivers did not finish the race, but were classified as they completed over 50% of the class winner's race distance.

=== Continents 992 Drivers' ===
Pos.	Drivers	Team	Class	(United Arab Emirates) DUB		TBA	TBA		Pts.
Pos.	Drivers	Team	Class	12hrs	24hrs	TBA	12hrs	24hrs	Pts.
1	(Sweden) Gustav Bard (Sweden) Gustav Bergström (Sweden) Henric Skoog (Sweden) Patrik Skoog	(Germany) No. 929 HRT Performance	Am	26^{F}	23				29
2	(Netherlands) Lucas Groeneveld (Netherlands) Daan van Kuijk (Netherlands) Jesse van Kuijk (Netherlands) Max van Splunteren	(Netherlands) No. 934 Team GP-Elite	Pro	17	14				28
3	(Netherlands) Roger Hodenius (Netherlands) Larry ten Voorde (Netherlands) Steven van Rhee (Netherlands) Thierry Vermeulen	(Netherlands) No. 933 Team GP-Elite	Pro	16^{PF}	20^{PF}				27
4	(Belgium) Tom Boonen (Belgium) Kurt Hensen (Netherlands) Luc Vanderfeesten (Belgium) Philippe Wils	(Belgium) No. 904 Red Ant Racing	Am	30	27				26
5	(Lithuania) Julius Adomavičius (Netherlands) Jeroen Bleekemolen (Netherlands) Ivo Breukers (Netherlands) Morris Schuring	(Netherlands) No. 909 Red Camel-Jordans.nl	Pro	31	22				24
6	(Sweden) Erik Behrens (Sweden) Tommy Gråberg (Sweden) Hans Holmlund (Sweden) Daniel Roos	(Germany) No. 928 HRT Performance	Am	40	29				23
7	(Germany) Stefan Aust (Russia) Nikolai Gadetskii (Germany) Holger Harmsen (United Kingdom) JM Littman	(Germany) No. 930 HRT Performance	Am	44	35				20
7	(Netherlands) John de Wilde (Belgium) Olivier Dons (Belgium) Jean-Michel Gerome (France) Eric Mouez (Belgium) Brent Verheyen	(Belgium) No. 979 Speed Lover	Am	34	36				20
7	(United Arab Emirates) Saif Al Ameri (United Arab Emirates) Salem Al Ketbi (United Arab Emirates) Helal Ali Mazrouei (United Arab Emirates) Fahad Al Zaabi (United Arab Emirates) Saeed Almheir	(United Arab Emirates) No. 977 RABDAN Motorsports by ID Racing	Pro	38	28				20
8	(Kazakhstan) Alexandr Artemyev (Finland) Jukka Honkavuori (United Arab Emirates) Bashar Mardini (Austria) Philipp Sager (Austria) Christopher Zöchling	(Germany) No. 944 ID Racing	Pro	55	33				17
9	(Brazil) Atila Roberto de Abreu (Brazil) Georgios Frangulis (Brazil) Eduardo Menossi (Brazil) Leonardo Sanchez Secundino (Brazil) Rouman Zimekiewicz	(Switzerland) No. 962 Fach Auto TECH	Pro	35	57				15
10	(Lithuania) Audrius Butkevicius (United States) Vincent Piemonte (Switzerland) Adrian Spescha (Hong Kong) Shaun Thong	(Germany) No. 940 ID Racing	Pro	60	42				14
Pos.	Drivers	Team	Class	(United Arab Emirates) DUB		TBA	TBA		Pts.

† – Drivers did not finish the race, but were classified as they completed over 50% of the class winner's race distance.

== See also ==
- 24H Series
