= Hankook 12H Kuwait =

Sports car endurance race held in Kuwait

12 Hours of Kuwait
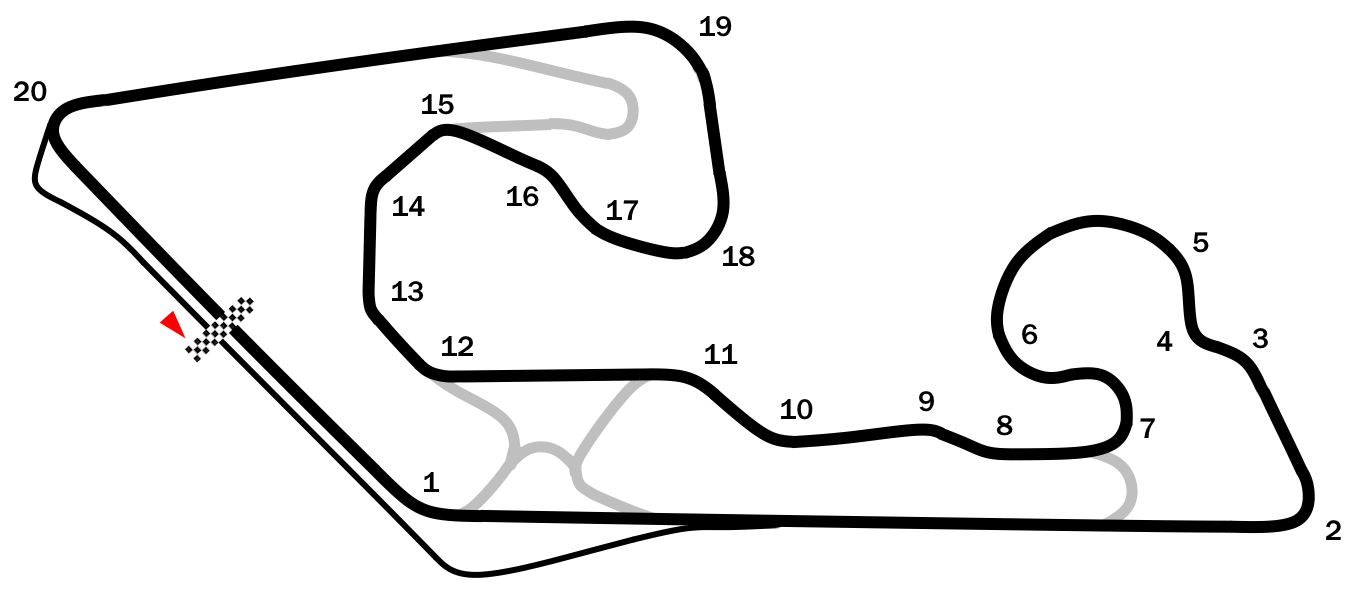

Middle East Trophy
- Venue: Kuwait Motor Town
- First race: 2022
- Last race: 2023
- Duration: 12 Hours
- Most wins (driver): (United States) Charles Espenlaub (2) (United States) Joe Foster (2) (United States) Shane Lewis (2) (United States) Charles Putman (2)
- Most wins (team): CP Racing (2)
- Most wins (manufacturer): Mercedes-AMG (2)

Hankook 12H Kuwait was a sports car and touring car automobile endurance race held at the Kuwait Motor Town.

== History ==
The inaugural edition of the race was included in the first season of the Middle East Trophy and served as the opening round. Creventic announced that a deal had been reached to run the race run again the next year as the first event of the 2023–24 Middle East Trophy season with another event for 2024 confirmed as a part of a three-year contract. However, when the 2024–25 schedule was announced, the event did not appear.

== Race winners ==
Year	Drivers	Team	Car	Remarks
2023	(United States) Charles Espenlaub (United States) Joe Foster (United States) Shane Lewis (United States) Charles Putman	(United States) CP Racing	Mercedes-AMG GT3 Evo	363 Laps.
2022	(United States) Charles Espenlaub (United States) Joe Foster (United States) Shane Lewis (United States) Charles Putman	(United States) CP Racing	Mercedes-AMG GT3 Evo	323 Laps.
