= 2023 12 Hours of Kuwait =

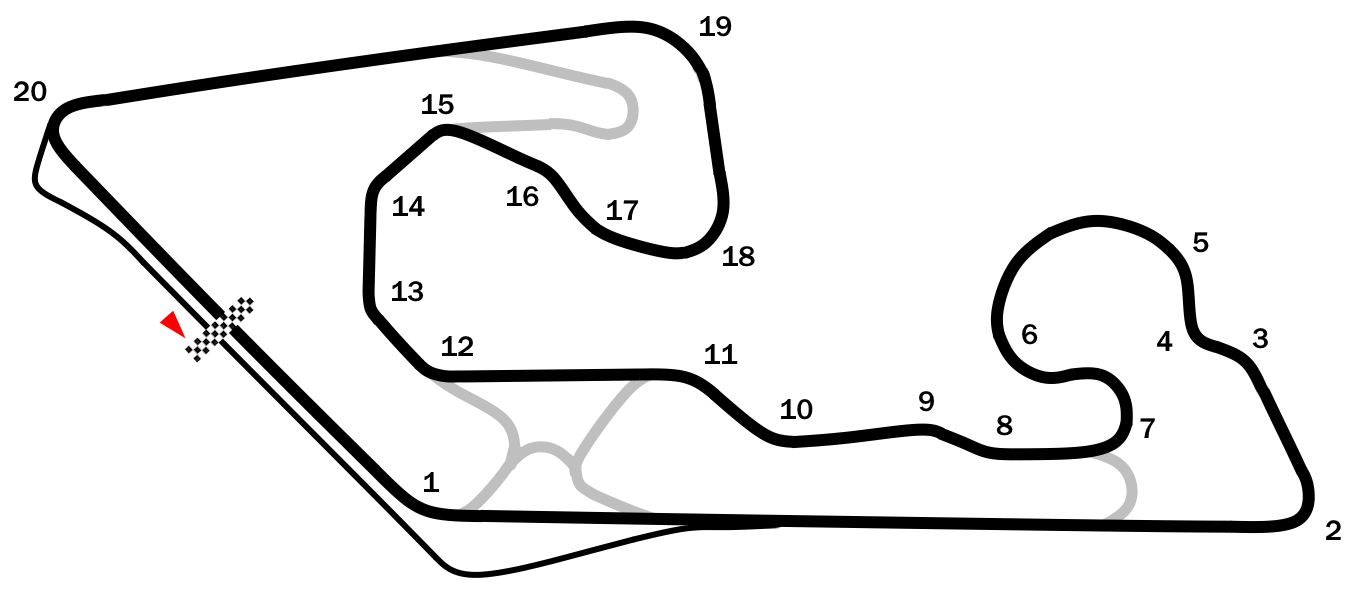
The layout of the Kuwait Motor Town, where the race was held.

The 2023 12 Hours of Kuwait (formally known as the Hankook 12 Hours of Kuwait) was an endurance sportscar racing event held on 9 December 2023, as the first of three rounds of the 2023–24 Middle East Trophy. This was the second running of the event.

== Background ==
The event was announced on 11 October 2023 along with the rest of the 2023–24 Middle East Trophy calendar.

== Schedule ==
Date	Time (local: AST)	Event	Duration
Friday, 8 December	10:00 - 11:30	Free Practice	90 Minutes
Friday, 8 December	15:00 - 15:55	Qualifying	3x15 Minutes
Friday, 8 December	17:00 - 18:30	Night Practice	90 Minutes
Saturday, 9 December	10:00 - 22:00	Race	12 Hours

== Entry list ==
The entry list was revealed on 7 December 2023, and featured 14 cars: 3 GT3 cars, 4 Porsche 992 GT3 Cup cars, 3 GTX cars, 2 GT4 cars, and 2 TCX cars.

No.	Entrant	Car	Class	Driver 1	Driver 2	Driver 3	Driver 4	Driver 5
GT3 (3 entries)
22	(United Kingdom) Century Motorsport	BMW M4 GT3	PA	(United Kingdom) Jack Barlow	(United Kingdom) Carl Cavers	(United Kingdom) Lewis Plato		
85	(United States) CP Racing	Mercedes-AMG GT3 Evo	Am	(United States) Charles Espenlaub	(United States) Joe Foster	(United States) Shane Lewis	(United States) Charles Putman	
95	(United Arab Emirates) Manamauri Energy by Ebimotors	Porsche 911 GT3 R (992)	P	(Italy) Fabrizio Broggi	(Italy) Sabino de Castro	(Romania) Sergiu Nicolae	(Italy) Cosimo Papi	
GTX (3 entries)
701	(France) Vortex V8	Vortex 2.0		(France) Lionel Amrouche	(France) Philippe Bonnel	(France) Arnaud Gomez	(France) Olivier Gomez	
714	(Austria) Razoon – More than Racing	KTM X-Bow GT2		(Poland) Arthur Chwist	(Austria) Daniel Drexel	(Kuwait) Haytham Qarajouli	(Austria) Dominik Olbert	
795	(United Kingdom) Toro Verde GT	Ginetta G56 Cup		(United Kingdom) Mike Simpson	(United Kingdom) Freddie Tomlinson	(United Kingdom) Lawrence Tomlinson		
992 (4 entries)
909	(Netherlands) Red Camel-Jordans.nl	Porsche 992 GT3 Cup	P	(Netherlands) Ivo Breukers	(Netherlands) Luc Breukers	(Netherlands) Rik Breukers	(Switzerland) Fabian Danz	
936	(Germany) KKrämer Racing	Porsche 992 GT3 Cup	P	(Germany) Michele di Martino	(Germany) Karsten Krämer	(Kyrgyzstan) "Selv"	(Germany) Moritz Kranz	(Germany) Tobias Müller
937	(Germany) KKrämer Racing	Porsche 992 GT3 Cup	Am	(Germany) Michele di Martino	(Germany) Karsten Krämer	(Kyrgyzstan) "Selv"		
971	(United Arab Emirates) RABDAN by Fulgenzi Racing	Porsche 992 GT3 Cup	P	(United Arab Emirates) Saif Alameri	(Austria) Christopher Zöchling	(Italy) Enrico Fulgenzi		
GT4 (2 entries)
429	(United Kingdom) Century Motorsport	BMW M4 GT4 Gen II		(United Kingdom) Ravi Ramyead	(United Kingdom) Charlie Robertson	(United Kingdom) David Holloway	(United Kingdom) Nathan Freke	
438	(United Kingdom) AGMC Racing Team by Simpson Motorsport	BMW M4 GT4 Gen II		(Belgium) Fabian Duffieux	(Kyrgyzstan) Andrey Solukovtsev (Note: Solukovtsev, a Russian, competes under a Kyrgyz license as Russian national emblems were banned by the FIA following the Russian invasion of Ukraine.)	(Cyprus) Vasily Vladykin		
TCR/TCX (2 entries)
138	(United Kingdom) Simpson Motorsport	Audi RS 3 LMS TCR (2017)		(United Kingdom) Ricky Coomber	(United Kingdom) James Kaye	(United Kingdom) Jack Lemmer	(United Kingdom) Henry Neal	(Cyprus) Vasily Vladykin
278	(United Kingdom) CWS Engineering	Ginetta G55 Supercup		(United Kingdom) Colin White	(Spain) Christian Broberg	(Australia) Neale Muston		

GT3 entries
Icon	Class
P	GT3-Pro
PA	GT3-Pro Am
Am	GT3-Am
992 entries
Icon	Class
P	992-Pro
Am	992-Am

== Practice ==
Class	No.	Entrant	Driver	Time
GT3	85	(United States) CP Racing	(United States) Charles Espenlaub	1:43.729
GTX	714	(Austria) Razoon – More than Racing	(Kuwait) Haytham Qarajouli	1:47.380
992	971	(United Arab Emirates) RABDAN by Fulgenzi Racing	(Austria) Christopher Zöchling	1:47.509
GT4	429	(United Kingdom) Century Motorsport	(United Kingdom) Charlie Robertson	1:53.171
TCE	138	(United Kingdom) Simpson Motorsport	(United Kingdom) Henry Neal	1:54.938

- Note: Only the fastest car in each class is shown.

== Night Practice ==
Class	No.	Entrant	Driver	Time
GT3	22	(United Kingdom) Century Motorsport	(United Kingdom) Lewis Plato	1:43.449
GTX	795	(United Kingdom) Toro Verde GT	(United Kingdom) Mike Simpson	1:48.082
992	971	(United Arab Emirates) RABDAN by Fulgenzi Racing	(Austria) Christopher Zöchling	1:47.016
GT4	429	(United Kingdom) Century Motorsport	(United Kingdom) Charlie Robertson	1:53.132
TCE	278	(United Kingdom) CWS Engineering	(United Kingdom) Colin White	1:56.736

- Note: Only the fastest car in each class is shown.

== Qualifying ==
=== Qualifying results ===
Pole position winners in each class are marked in bold.

Pos.	Class	No.	Team	Q1	Q2	Q3	Avg
1	**GT3 Am**	**85**	**(United States) CP Racing**	1:45.251	1:43.968	1:44.013	**1:44.410**
2	**GT3 Pro/Am**	**22**	**(United Kingdom) Century Motorsport**	1:45.182	1:44.522	1:45.196	**1:44.966**
3	**GT3 Pro**	**95**	**(United Arab Emirates) Manamauri Energy by Ebimotors**	1:47.595	1:43.836	1:44.043	**1:45.158**
4	**GTX**	**701**	**(France) Vortex V8**	1:49.623	1:46.844	1:45.465	**1:47.310**
5	**992 Pro**	**909**	**(Netherlands) Red Camel-Jordans.nl**	1:48.520	1:48.275	1:47.306	**1:48.033**
6	GTX	795	(United Kingdom) Toro Verde GT	1:50.188	1:48.237	1:46.954	1:48.459
7	992 Pro	971	(United Arab Emirates) RABDAN by Fulgenzi Racing	1:50.383	1:47.816	1:47.233	1:48.477
8	GTX	714	(Austria) Razoon – More than Racing	1:50.058	1:48.192	1:47.461	1:48.570
9	992 Pro	936	(Germany) KKrämer Racing	1:49.860	1:48.095	1:48.768	1:48.907
10	**992 Am**	**937**	**(Germany) KKrämer Racing**	1:52.601	1:49.268	1:51.732	**1:51.200**
11	**GT4**	**429**	**(United Kingdom) Century Motorsport**	1:53.796	1:53.774	1:52.923	**1:53.497**
12	GT4	438	(United Kingdom) AGMC Racing Team by Simpson Motorsport	1:54.342	1:54.907	1:55.324	1:54.857
13	**TCX**	**278**	**(United Kingdom) CWS Racing**	1:56.064	1:55.978	1:55.013	**1:55.685**
14	**TCR**	**138**	**(United Kingdom) Simpson Motorsport**	1:59.698	–	1:57.930	**1:58.814**

== Race ==
=== Race results ===
Class winners are in bold.

Pos	Class	No	Team	Drivers	Car	Time/Reason	Laps
Pos	Class	No	Team	Drivers	Engine	Time/Reason	Laps
1	**GT3 Am**	**85**	**(United States) CP Racing**	**(United States) Charles Espenlaub** **(United States) Joe Foster** **(United States) Shane Lewis** **(United States) Charles Putman**	**Mercedes-AMG GT3 Evo**	**12:01:07.588**	**363**
1	**GT3 Am**	**85**	**(United States) CP Racing**	**(United States) Charles Espenlaub** **(United States) Joe Foster** **(United States) Shane Lewis** **(United States) Charles Putman**	**Mercedes-AMG M159 6.2 L V8**	**12:01:07.588**	**363**
2	**GT3 Pro**	**95**	**(United Arab Emirates) Manamauri Energy by Ebimotors**	**(Italy) Fabrizio Broggi** **(Italy) Sabino de Castro** **(Romania) Sergiu Nicolae** **(Italy) Cosimo Papi**	**Porsche 911 GT3 R (992)**	**+0.537**	**363**
2	**GT3 Pro**	**95**	**(United Arab Emirates) Manamauri Energy by Ebimotors**	**(Italy) Fabrizio Broggi** **(Italy) Sabino de Castro** **(Romania) Sergiu Nicolae** **(Italy) Cosimo Papi**	**Porsche M97/80 4.2 L Flat-6**	**+0.537**	**363**
3	**GT3 Pro/Am**	**22**	**(United Kingdom) Century Motorsport**	**(United Kingdom) Jack Barlow** **(United Kingdom) Carl Cavers** **(United Kingdom) Lewis Plato**	**BMW M4 GT3**	**+55.508**	**363**
3	**GT3 Pro/Am**	**22**	**(United Kingdom) Century Motorsport**	**(United Kingdom) Jack Barlow** **(United Kingdom) Carl Cavers** **(United Kingdom) Lewis Plato**	**BMW S58B30T0 3.0 L Turbo V8**	**+55.508**	**363**
4	**992 Pro**	**909**	**(Netherlands) Red Camel-Jordans.nl**	**(Netherlands) Ivo Breukers** **(Netherlands) Luc Breukers** **(Netherlands) Rik Breukers** **(Switzerland) Fabian Danz**	**Porsche 992 GT3 Cup**	**+10 Laps**	**353**
4	**992 Pro**	**909**	**(Netherlands) Red Camel-Jordans.nl**	**(Netherlands) Ivo Breukers** **(Netherlands) Luc Breukers** **(Netherlands) Rik Breukers** **(Switzerland) Fabian Danz**	**Porsche 4.0 L Flat-6**	**+10 Laps**	**353**
5	992 Pro	971	(United Arab Emirates) RABDAN by Fulgenzi Racing	(United Arab Emirates) Saif Alameri (Austria) Christopher Zöchling (Italy) Enrico Fulgenzi	Porsche 992 GT3 Cup	+13 Laps	350
5	992 Pro	971	(United Arab Emirates) RABDAN by Fulgenzi Racing	(United Arab Emirates) Saif Alameri (Austria) Christopher Zöchling (Italy) Enrico Fulgenzi	Porsche 4.0 L Flat-6	+13 Laps	350
6	992 Pro	936	(Germany) KKrämer Racing	(Germany) Michele di Martino (Germany) Karsten Krämer (Kyrgyzstan) "Selv" (Germany) Moritz Kranz (Germany) Tobias Müller	Porsche 992 GT3 Cup	+22 Laps	341
6	992 Pro	936	(Germany) KKrämer Racing	(Germany) Michele di Martino (Germany) Karsten Krämer (Kyrgyzstan) "Selv" (Germany) Moritz Kranz (Germany) Tobias Müller	Porsche 4.0 L Flat-6	+22 Laps	341
7	**GTX**	**795**	**(United Kingdom) Toro Verde GT**	**(United Kingdom) Mike Simpson** **(United Kingdom) Freddie Tomlinson** **(United Kingdom) Lawrence Tomlinson**	**Ginetta G56 Cup**	**+28 Laps**	**335**
7	**GTX**	**795**	**(United Kingdom) Toro Verde GT**	**(United Kingdom) Mike Simpson** **(United Kingdom) Freddie Tomlinson** **(United Kingdom) Lawrence Tomlinson**	**GM LS3 6.2 L V8**	**+28 Laps**	**335**
8	GT4	438	(United Kingdom) AGMC Racing Team by Simpson Motorsport	(Belgium) Fabian Duffieux (Kyrgyzstan) Andrey Solukovtsev (Cyprus) Vasily Vladykin	BMW M4 GT4 Gen II	+32 Laps	331
8	GT4	438	(United Kingdom) AGMC Racing Team by Simpson Motorsport	(Belgium) Fabian Duffieux (Kyrgyzstan) Andrey Solukovtsev (Cyprus) Vasily Vladykin	BMW N55 3.0 L Twin-Turbo I6	+32 Laps	331
9	GT4	429	(United Kingdom) Century Motorsport	(United Kingdom) Ravi Ramyead (United Kingdom) Charlie Robertson (United Kingdom) David Holloway (United Kingdom) Nathan Freke	BMW M4 GT4 Gen II	+41 Laps	322
9	GT4	429	(United Kingdom) Century Motorsport	(United Kingdom) Ravi Ramyead (United Kingdom) Charlie Robertson (United Kingdom) David Holloway (United Kingdom) Nathan Freke	BMW N55 3.0 L Twin-Turbo I6	+41 Laps	322
10	GTX	714	(Austria) Razoon – More than Racing	(Poland) Arthur Chwist (Austria) Daniel Drexel (Kuwait) Haytham Qarajouli (Austria) Dominik Olbert	KTM X-Bow GT2	+43 Laps	320
10	GTX	714	(Austria) Razoon – More than Racing	(Poland) Arthur Chwist (Austria) Daniel Drexel (Kuwait) Haytham Qarajouli (Austria) Dominik Olbert	Audi 2.5 L I5	+43 Laps	320
11	**TCR**	**138**	**(United Kingdom) Simpson Motorsport**	**(United Kingdom) Ricky Coomber** **(United Kingdom) James Kaye** **(United Kingdom) Jack Lemmer** **(United Kingdom) Henry Neal** **(Cyprus) Vasily Vladykin**	**Audi RS 3 LMS TCR (2017)**	**+43 Laps**	**320**
11	**TCR**	**138**	**(United Kingdom) Simpson Motorsport**	**(United Kingdom) Ricky Coomber** **(United Kingdom) James Kaye** **(United Kingdom) Jack Lemmer** **(United Kingdom) Henry Neal** **(Cyprus) Vasily Vladykin**	**Volkswagen EA888 2.0 L I4**	**+43 Laps**	**320**
12	**TCX**	**278**	**(United Kingdom) CWS Engineering**	**(United Kingdom) Colin White** **(Spain) Christian Broberg** **(Australia) Neale Muston**	**Ginetta G55 Supercup**	**+50 Laps**	**313**
12	**TCX**	**278**	**(United Kingdom) CWS Engineering**	**(United Kingdom) Colin White** **(Spain) Christian Broberg** **(Australia) Neale Muston**	**Ford Cyclone 3.7 L V6**	**+50 Laps**	**313**
13	GTX	701	(France) Vortex V8	(France) Lionel Amrouche (France) Philippe Bonnel (France) Arnaud Gomez (France) Olivier Gomez	Vortex 2.0	+106 Laps	257
13	GTX	701	(France) Vortex V8	(France) Lionel Amrouche (France) Philippe Bonnel (France) Arnaud Gomez (France) Olivier Gomez	Chevrolet LS3 6.2 L V8	+106 Laps	257
14	**992 Am**	**937**	**(Germany) KKrämer Racing**	**(Germany) Karsten Krämer** **(Germany) Michele di Martino** **(Kyrgyzstan) "Selv"**	**Porsche 992 GT3 Cup**	**+177 Laps**	**186**
14	**992 Am**	**937**	**(Germany) KKrämer Racing**	**(Germany) Karsten Krämer** **(Germany) Michele di Martino** **(Kyrgyzstan) "Selv"**	**Porsche 4.0 L Flat-6**	**+177 Laps**	**186**

== Notes ==
Middle East Trophy
Previous race: none	2023–24 season	Next race: 2024 6 Hours of Abu Dhabi
