= Kuwait Motor Town =

Race track in Kuwait

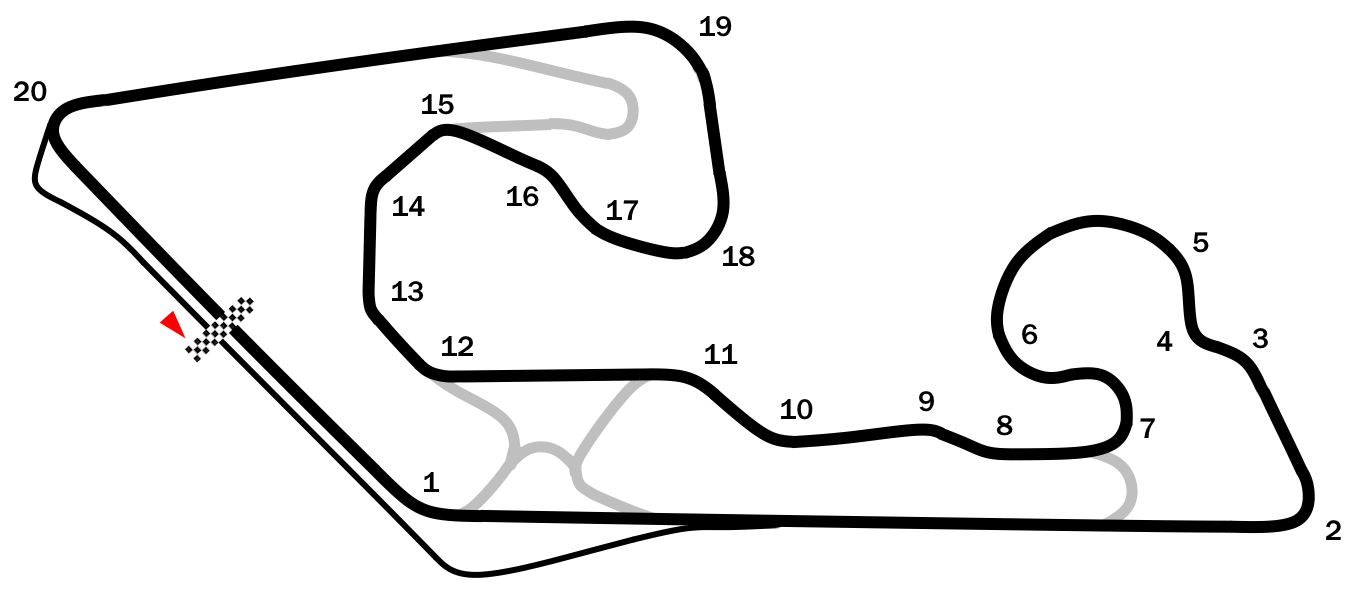
- Grand Prix Circuit (2019–present)
- Location: Ali Sabah Al Salem, Ahmadi Governorate, Kuwait
- Coordinates: 28°55′48″N 48°8′30″E
- Capacity: 8,000 seated
- FIA Grade: 1 (Note: Kuwait Motor Town's Grade 1 license expired 19 February 2025.)
- Broke ground: 2017
- Opened: 28 March 2019; 7 years ago
- Construction cost: KWD 49 million (US $162 million)
- Architect: Hermann Tilke
- Major events: Former: 24H Series Middle East Trophy; 12 Hours of Kuwait (2022–2023); FR Middle East (2023); F4 Saudi Arabia (2024)
- Website: https://www.kmt.kw/

Grand Prix Circuit (2019–present)
- Surface: Asphalt
- Length: 5.609 km (3.485 mi)
- Turns: 20
- Race lap record: 1:47.600 ( (Switzerland) Joshua Dufek, Tatuus F3 T-318, 2023, F-Regional)

Alternative Grand Prix Circuit (2019–present)
- Length: 5.160 km (3.206 mi)
- Turns: 18
- Race lap record: 1:43.065 ( (Romania) Sergiu Nicolae, Porsche 911 (992 I) GT3 R, 2023, GT3)

National Circuit (2019–present)
- Length: 4.540 km (2.821 mi)
- Turns: 17

South Circuit (2019–present)
- Length: 1.597 km (0.992 mi)
- Turns: 8

Kuwait Motor Town is a 5.609 km (3.485 mi) motor racing circuit in Kuwait, located 56 km (35 mi) south of the capital Kuwait City. The main circuit is the first circuit in Kuwait to hold an FIA Grade One and FIM Grade A licence. The Kuwait Motor Town aims to place Kuwait at the forefront of world-class motorsport events.

== History ==
The circuit was penned by Formula One circuit designer Hermann Tilke in early 2017. Construction was undertaken by KCC Engineering and Contracting Company at a reported cost of KWD49 million (US$162 million). Circuit construction was completed in December 2018 with the circuit opening in 2019. Further development around the circuit is set to take place, including an "Entertainment City" shopping centre.

The first event held at the circuit was the opening round of the 2019 Middle East Rally Championship on March 28.

In terms of international auto racing series, 24H Series was the first event, which was held on 2 December 2022.

== Events ==
Former

- 24H Series Middle East Trophy
  - 12 Hours of Kuwait (2022–2023)
- F4 Saudi Arabian Championship (2024)
- Formula 4 UAE Championship (2023)
- Formula Regional Middle East Championship (2023)
- Radical Cup Kuwait (2023–2024)

== Lap records ==
As of December 2023, the fastest official race lap records at Kuwait Motor Town are listed as:

Category	Time	Driver	Vehicle	Event
Grand Prix Circuit (2019–present): 5.609 km (3.485 mi)
Formula Regional	1:47.600	Joshua Dufek	Tatuus F3 T-318	2023 1st Kuwait Formula Regional Middle East round
GT3	1:52.062	Zdeno Mikulasko	Lamborghini Huracán GT3	2022 12 Hours of Kuwait
Formula 4	1:54.295	James Wharton	Tatuus F4-T421	2023 1st Kuwait F4 UAE round
Porsche Carrera Cup	1:55.272	Sergiu Nicolae	Porsche 911 (992 I) GT3 Cup	2022 12 Hours of Kuwait
TCR Touring Car	2:01.297	Kantasak Kusiri	CUPRA León Competición TCR	2022 12 Hours of Kuwait
GT4	2:01.330	Bradley Ellis	Aston Martin Vantage AMR GT4	2022 12 Hours of Kuwait
Alternative Grand Prix Circuit (2019–present): 5.160 km (3.206 mi)
GT3	1:43.065	Sergiu Nicolae	Porsche 911 (992 I) GT3 R	2023 12 Hours of Kuwait
Porsche Carrera Cup	1:46.229	Christopher Zöchling	Porsche 911 (992 I) GT3 Cup	2023 12 Hours of Kuwait
GT4	1:51.804	Charlie Robertson	BMW M4 GT4	2023 12 Hours of Kuwait

== See also ==
- Kuwait National Cultural District
