= Janne Stiak =

German racing driver (born 2007)

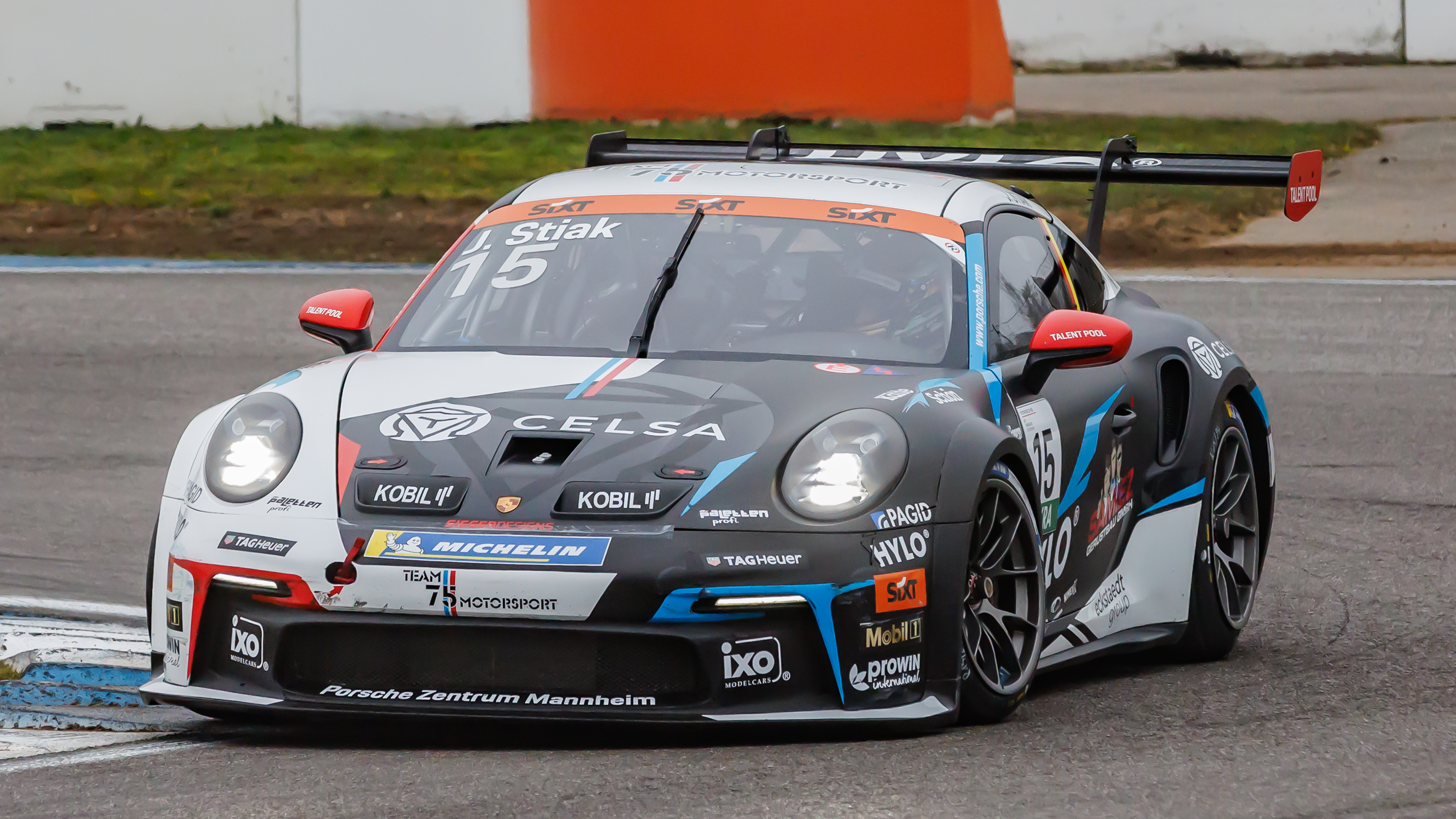
- Stiak in 2024
- Nationality: (Germany) German
- Born: 10 March 2007 (age 19) Steinhude, Germany
- Categorisation: FIA Silver

Championship titles
- 2024–25: Porsche Carrera Cup Middle East – Pro

Janne Stiak (born 10 March 2007) is a German racing driver who last competed in Porsche Carrera Cup North America for ACI Motorsports.

== Career ==
Stiak began karting in 2018, competing until 2023. During his karting career, Stiak most notably won the 2022 Rotax Max Challenge Germany Senior title and also finished third in the RMC International Trophy standings. Two years after his last appearance in karts, Stiak made a one-off return to karting in 2025, racing in the DD2 class of the RMC International Trophy with Kraft Motorsport.

In 2023, Stiak stepped up to car racing, joining ID Racing to compete in both Porsche Sprint Challenge Southern Europe and Porsche Carrera Cup Germany. In his first season in Carrera Cup Germany, Stiak scored a best result of eighth in race two at Nürburgring, to end the year 15th in points. At the end of the year, Stiak competed in the 2023–24 Porsche Carrera Cup Middle East for JS Racing, scoring seven podiums en route to runner-up honors at season's end.

The following year, Stiak joined TEAM 75 Bernhard for his sophomore season in Porsche Carrera Cup Germany, whilst also joining Target Competition for his rookie season in Porsche Carrera Cup Italia. In the former, Stiak scored his maiden podium in race one at Oschersleben by finishing second, before taking his maiden win four rounds later at Sachsenring en route to an 11th-place points finish. Competing in all but one rounds in the Italian series, Stiak achieved his only win of the season at Vallelunga to end the season sixth in the standings. At the end of the year, Stiak raced in the 2024–25 Porsche Carrera Cup Middle East for DHL Team, winning all but three races he contested and finishing second in the other three to win the title with a round to spare.

Remaining with Target Competition for 2025, Stiak raced with them for his third season in Porsche Carrera Cup Germany and his first in Porsche Supercup. In the former, Stiak took his only win of the season in race one at Zandvoort, and scored two third-place finishes at the same round and Red Bull Ring to end the year sixth in points as the highest-placed German. In Supercup, Stiak scored a best result of sixth at Zandvoort to end the season tenth in his rookie year in the series, and also made a one-off return to Porsche Carrera Cup Italia for the same team at Imola.

In 2026, Stiak joined ACI Motorsports to compete in Porsche Carrera Cup North America. In his first season stateside, Stiak qualified on pole in Miami, before taking wins at Watkins Glen and Circuit of the Americas to secure third in overall points with five additional podiums to his name.

== Karting record ==
=== Karting career summary ===
Season	Series	Team	Position
2020	Rotax Max Euro Winter Cup – Junior	Kraft Motorsport	51st
2020	Rotax Max Euro Trophy – Junior	Kraft Motorsport	39th
2020	Rotax Max Challenge Germany – Junior		9th
2021	Rotax Max Euro Trophy – Junior	Kraft Motorsport	16th
2021	Rotax Max Challenge Germany – Junior		7th
2021	BNL Karting Series – Rotax Max Junior		31st
2021	Rotax Max Euro Golden Trophy – Rotax Junior		23rd
2022	Rotax Winter Cup – Senior Max	Kraft Motorsport	31st
2022	Rotax Max Euro Trophy – Senior	Kraft Motorsport	10th
2022	RMC International Trophy – Senior	Kraft Motorsport	3rd
2022	Rotax Max Challenge Grand Finals – Senior	Kraft Motorsport	6th
2022	Rotax Max Challenge Germany – Senior		1st
2023	Rotax Winter Cup – Senior Max	Kraft Motorsport	7th
2023	Rotax Max Euro Trophy – Senior Max	Kraft Motorsport	55th
2025	RMC International Trophy – DD2	Kraft Motorsport	14th

== Racing record ==
=== Racing career summary ===
Season	Series	Team	Races	Wins	Poles	F/Laps	Podiums	Points	Position
2023	Porsche Sprint Challenge Southern Europe – Sport Pro/Am	ID Racing	5	0	0	0	1	61	5th
2023	Porsche Carrera Cup Germany	ID Racing	16	0	0	0	0	43	15th
2023–24	Porsche Carrera Cup Middle East – Pro	JS Racing	12	0	0	0	7	192	**2nd**
2024	Porsche Carrera Cup Germany	TEAM 75 Bernhard	16	1	1	1	2	91	11th
2024	Porsche Carrera Cup Italy	Target Competition	10	1	0	0	1	106	6th
2024–25	Porsche Carrera Cup Middle East – Pro	DHL Team	10	7	7	7	10	235	**1st**
2025	Porsche Carrera Cup Germany	Target Competition	16	1	0	0	3	157	6th
2025	Porsche Supercup	Target Competition	8	0	0	0	0	46.5	10th
2025	Porsche Carrera Cup Italy	Target Competition	2	0	0	0	0	15	24th
2026	Porsche Carrera Cup North America	ACI Motorsports	16	2	1	2	7	232	**3rd**
2026	Porsche Carrera Cup Germany	Forch Racing by Atlas Ward	2	0	0	0	0	16	22nd

^{†} As Stiak was a guest driver, he was ineligible to score points.

=== Complete Porsche Carrera Cup Germany results ===
(key) (Races in bold indicate pole position) (Races in italics indicate fastest lap)

Year	Team	1	2	3	4	5	6	7	8	9	10	11	12	13	14	15	16	DC	Points
2023	ID Racing	SPA; 1 Ret	SPA; 2; 15	HOC1; 1; 19	HOC1; 2; 14	ZAN; 1; 11	ZAN; 2; 16	NÜR; 1; 17	NÜR; 2; 8	LAU; 1; 14	LAU; 2; 13	SAC; 1; 10	SAC; 2; 12	RBR; 1; 15	RBR; 2; 15	HOC2; 1; 10	HOC2; 2; 12	15th	43
2024	TEAM 75 Bernhard	IMO; 1; 12	IMO; 2; 9	OSC; 1; 2	OSC; 2; 7	ZAN; 1 Ret	ZAN; 2 Ret	HUN; 1; 7	HUN; 2; 13	NÜR; 1; 16	NÜR; 2; 5	SAC; 1 DSQ	**SAC**; **2**; 1	RBR; 1 Ret	RBR; 2; 14	HOC; 1; 16	HOC; 2 Ret	11th	91
2025	Target	IMO; 1; 10	IMO; 2; 13	SPA; 1; 14	SPA; 2; 7	ZAN; 1; 1	ZAN; 2; 3	NOR; 1; 11	NOR; 2; 12	NÜR; 1; 7	NÜR; 2; 7	SAC; 1; 6	SAC; 2; 5	RBR; 1; 3	RBR; 2; 4	HOC; 1; 8	HOC; 2; 8	6th	157
2026	Forch Racing by Atlas Ward	IMO; 1	IMO; 2	RBR; 1	RBR; 2	SPA; 1	SPA; 2	ZAN; 1	ZAN; 2	LAU; 1	LAU; 2	NOR; 1	NOR; 2	NÜR; 1	NÜR; 2	HOC; 1; 11	HOC; 2; 5	22nd	16

=== Complete Porsche Carrera Cup Italia results ===
(key) (Races in bold indicate pole position) (Races in italics indicate fastest lap)

Year	Team	1	2	3	4	5	6	7	8	9	10	11	12	Pos	Points
2024	Target Competition	MIS; 1; 12	MIS; 2; 8	IMO1; 1; 6	IMO1; 2; 4	MUG; 1; 10	MUG; 2; 6	IMO2; 1	IMO2; 2	VLL; 1; 11	VLL; 2; 1	MNZ; 1; 5	MNZ; 2; 5	6th	106
2025	Target Competition	MIS1; 1	MIS1; 2	VLL; 1	VLL; 2	MUG; 1	MUG; 2	IMO; 1; 5	IMO; 2; 13	MIS2; 1	MIS2; 2	MNZ; 1	MNZ; 2	24th	15

=== Complete Porsche Supercup results ===
(key) (Races in bold indicate pole position) (Races in italics indicate fastest lap)

Year	Team	1	2	3	4	5	6	7	8	Pos.	Points
2025	Target Competition	IMO; 9	MON; 11	CAT; 11	RBR; 7	SPA; 10	HUN; Ret	ZAN; 6	MNZ; 12	10th	46.5

=== Complete Porsche Carrera Cup North America results ===
(key) (Races in bold indicate pole position) (Races in italics indicate fastest lap)

Year	Team	Class	1	2	3	4	5	6	7	8	9	10	11	12	13	14	15	16	17	Pos	Points
2026	ACI Motorsports	Pro	SEB; 1; 12	SEB; 2; 24	LBH; 1; 6	LBH; 2; 6	**MIA**; **1**; 10	MIA; 2 C	WGL; 1; 1	WGL; 2; 2	ROA; 1; 4	ROA; 2; 2	ROA; 3; 4	IMS; 1; 2	IMS; 2; 2	ATL; 1; 7	ATL; 2; 4	COT; 1; 1	COT; 2; 2	3rd	232
