= 2025 Porsche Carrera Cup Benelux =

Motorsport season

The 2025 Porsche Carrera Cup Benelux was the 13th season of Porsche Carrera Cup Benelux. It began at Circuit de Spa-Francorchamps at 8 May and finished at Circuit Zandvoort at 28 September.

== Calendar ==
| Round | Circuit | Date | Supporting |
|---|---|---|---|
| 1 | Circuit de Spa-Francorchamps, Stavelot, Belgium | 8–10 May | FIA World Endurance Championship; Porsche Carrera Cup Germany |
| 2 | Circuit Zandvoort, Zandvoort, Netherlands | 6–8 June | Deutsche Tourenwagen Masters; Formula Regional European Championship; ADAC GT Masters; Porsche Carrera Cup Germany |
| 3 | Hungaroring, Mogyoród, Hungary | 4–6 July | International GT Open; Formula Regional European Championship; Euroformula Open Championship; GB3 Championship |
| 4 | TT Circuit Assen, Assen, Netherlands | 8–10 August | Eurocup-3; Supercar Challenge; Ford Fiesta Sprint Cup |
| 5 | Circuit Zolder, Heusden-Zolder, Belgium | 12–14 September | European Truck Racing Championship |
| 6 | Circuit Zandvoort, Zandvoort, Netherlands | 26–28 September | Supercar Challenge; Ford Fiesta Sprint Cup |

== Entry list ==
| Team | No. | Driver | Class | Rounds |
|---|---|---|---|---|
| (Netherlands) Team GP Elite | 5 | (Lithuania) Domas Raudonis | P | 1–4 |
| (Netherlands) Team GP Elite | 7 | (Netherlands) Niels Troost | PA | 2 |
| (Netherlands) Team GP Elite | 17 | (Belgium) Dréke Janssen | P | 1, 6 |
| (Netherlands) Team GP Elite | 27 | (Netherlands) Daan Van Kuijk | P | 1 |
| (Netherlands) Team GP Elite | 42 | (France) Cédric Chassang | PA | 2 |
| (Netherlands) Team GP Elite | 919 | (Netherlands) Hjelte Hoffner | R | 4 |
| (Belgium) RedAnt Racing | 10 | (Netherlands) Niels Langeveld | P | All |
| (Belgium) RedAnt Racing | 96 | (Poland) Milan Marczak | R | All |
| (Belgium) RedAnt Racing with Porsche Estonia | 48 | (Estonia) Thomas Kangro | P | All |
| (Serbia) Spark Racing Team | 11 | (Serbia) Nikola Miljković | P | All |
| (Netherlands) PG Motorsport | 13 | (Netherlands) Mees Muller | R | All |
| (Netherlands) PG Motorsport | 98 | (Netherlands) Nick Ho | P | All |
| (Netherlands) JW Raceservice | 14 | (Belgium) Tomas de Backer | R | 1 |
| (Germany) cargraphic by Kurt Ecke Motorsport | 15 | (Germany) Max Schlichenmeier | R | All |
| (Belgium) Q1 Trackracing | 22 | (Andorra) Frank Porté Ruiz | R | All |
| (Belgium) Q1 Trackracing | 56 | (Bulgaria) Alexandra Vateva | R | 1–4 |
| (Finland) Team Koiranen | 23 | (Finland) Henri Tuomaala | PA | 1–4, 6 |
| (Belgium) NGT Racing | 32 | (Sweden) Robin Knutsson | P | All |
| (Finland) 39 Racing | 39 | (Finland) Jani Käkelä | PA | All |
| (Estonia) EST1 Racing | 47 | (Estonia) Alexander Reimann | P | All |
| (Netherlands) Bas Koeten Racing | 55 | (Germany) Colin Bönighausen | P | 2 |
| (Belgium) Team RaceArt | 65 | (Netherlands) Sam Jongejan | P | All |
| (Belgium) Team RaceArt | 69 | (Netherlands) Jaap van Lagen | P | All |
| (Belgium) Team RaceArt | 77 | (Netherlands) Jules Grouwels | PA | All |
| (Belgium) D'ieteren Luxury Performance | 92 | (Belgium) Bertrand Baguette | P | 1 |
| (Netherlands) MDM Motorsport | 919 | (Netherlands) Hjelte Hoffner | R | 1 |

| Icon | Class |
|---|---|
| P | Pro Cup |
| PA | Pro-Am Cup |
| R | Rookie |
| | Guest Starter |

== Race results ==
| Round | | Circuit | Pole position | Fastest lap | Overall winner | Winning team | Pro-Am winner | Rookie winner |
|---|---|---|---|---|---|---|---|---|
| 1 | R1 | (Belgium) Circuit de Spa-Francorchamps | (Sweden) Robin Knutsson | (Lithuania) Domas Raudonis | (Sweden) Robin Knutsson | (Belgium) NGT Racing | (Netherlands) Jules Grouwels | (Poland) Milan Marczak |
| 1 | R2 | (Belgium) Circuit de Spa-Francorchamps | (Belgium) Bertrand Baguette | (Netherlands) Niels Langeveld | (Belgium) Bertrand Baguette | (Belgium) D'ieteren Luxury Performance | (Finland) Henri Tuomaala | (Poland) Milan Marczak |
| 2 | R1 | (Netherlands) Circuit Zandvoort | (Netherlands) Niels Langeveld | (Netherlands) Niels Langeveld | (Netherlands) Niels Langeveld | (Belgium) RedAnt Racing | (Netherlands) Niels Troost | (Andorra) Frank Porté Ruiz |
| 2 | R2 | (Netherlands) Circuit Zandvoort | (Netherlands) Niels Langeveld | (Netherlands) Sam Jongejan | (Netherlands) Sam Jongejan | (Belgium) Team RaceArt | (Netherlands) Jules Grouwels | (Andorra) Frank Porté Ruiz |
| 3 | R1 | (Hungary) Hungaroring | (Netherlands) Jaap van Lagen | (Netherlands) Jaap van Lagen | (Netherlands) Jaap van Lagen | (Belgium) Team RaceArt | (Finland) Jani Käkelä | (Andorra) Frank Porté Ruiz |
| 3 | R2 | (Hungary) Hungaroring | (Netherlands) Jaap van Lagen | (Netherlands) Jaap van Lagen | (Netherlands) Sam Jongejan | (Belgium) Team RaceArt | (Netherlands) Jules Grouwels | (Poland) Milan Marczak |
| 4 | R1 | (Netherlands) TT Circuit Assen | (Sweden) Robin Knutsson | (Sweden) Robin Knutsson | (Sweden) Robin Knutsson | (Belgium) NGT Racing | (Netherlands) Jules Grouwels | (Andorra) Frank Porté Ruiz |
| 4 | R2 | (Netherlands) TT Circuit Assen | (Netherlands) Nick Ho | (Netherlands) Sam Jongejan | (Netherlands) Nick Ho | (Netherlands) PG Motorsport | (Finland) Jani Käkelä | (Andorra) Frank Porté Ruiz |
| 5 | R1 | (Belgium) Circuit Zolder | (Netherlands) Jaap van Lagen | (Netherlands) Jaap van Lagen | (Netherlands) Jaap van Lagen | (Belgium) Team RaceArt | (Netherlands) Jules Grouwels | (Andorra) Frank Porté Ruiz |
| 5 | R2 | (Belgium) Circuit Zolder | (Netherlands) Jaap van Lagen | (Netherlands) Sam Jongejan | (Netherlands) Sam Jongejan | (Belgium) Team RaceArt | (Netherlands) Jules Grouwels | (Germany) Max Schlichenmeier |
| 6 | R1 | (Netherlands) Circuit Zandvoort | (Netherlands) Sam Jongejan | (Netherlands) Sam Jongejan | (Netherlands) Jaap van Lagen | (Belgium) Team RaceArt | (Finland) Henri Tuomaala | (Poland) Milan Marczak |
| 6 | R2 | (Netherlands) Circuit Zandvoort | (Netherlands) Jaap van Lagen | (Netherlands) Jaap van Lagen | (Netherlands) Jaap van Lagen | (Belgium) Team RaceArt | (Netherlands) Jules Grouwels | (Poland) Milan Marczak |

== Championship standings ==
=== Scoring system ===
| Position | **1st** | **2nd** | **3rd** | **4th** | **5th** | **6th** | **7th** | **8th** | **9th** | **10th** | **11th** | **12th** | **13th** | **14th** | **15th** | Pole (R1) |
| Points | 25 | 20 | 17 | 14 | 12 | 10 | 9 | 8 | 7 | 6 | 5 | 4 | 3 | 2 | 1 | 1 |

=== Overall ===
| Pos | Driver | Team | (Belgium) SPA | | (Netherlands) ZAN1 | | (Hungary) HUN | | (Netherlands) ASS | | (Belgium) ZOL | | (Netherlands) ZAN2 | | Pts |
|---|---|---|---|---|---|---|---|---|---|---|---|---|---|---|---|
| 1 | (Netherlands) Jaap van Lagen | (Belgium) Team RaceArt | 2 | 3 | 5 | 2 | **1** | **11** | 2 | 3 | **1** | **2** | 1 | **1** | 234 |
| 2 | (Netherlands) Sam Jongejan | (Belgium) Team RaceArt | Ret | 4 | 3 | 1 | 5 | 1 | 6 | 5 | 2 | 1 | **2** | 7 | 189 |
| 3 | (Sweden) Robin Knutsson | (Belgium) NGT Racing | **1** | 5 | 2 | 3 | 4 | Ret | **1** | 4 | 3 | 3 | 4 | 3 | 188 |
| 4 | (Netherlands) Niels Langeveld | (Belgium) RedAnt Racing | 7 | 6 | **1** | **4** | 3 | 2 | 4 | 6 | 4 | 4 | 3 | 2 | 181 |
| 5 | (Netherlands) Nick Ho | (Netherlands) PG Motorsport | 5 | 2 | 6 | 12 | 6 | 5 | 3 | **1** | 6 | 5 | 5 | 4 | 159 |
| 6 | (Andorra) Frank Porté Ruiz | (Belgium) Q1 Trackracing | 15 | 9 | 7 | 5 | 2 | Ret | 5 | 2 | 5 | 14 | 15 | 6 | 106 |
| 7 | (Poland) Milan Marczak | (Belgium) RedAnt Racing | 6 | 7 | 9 | 6 | 8 | 4 | 13 | DNS | 7 | 9 | 6 | 5 | 102 |
| 8 | (Netherlands) Mees Muller | (Netherlands) PG Motorsport | 9 | 10 | 12 | 18† | 10 | 6 | 9 | 12 | Ret | 11 | 12 | 10 | 66 |
| 9 | (Lithuania) Domas Raudonis | (Netherlands) Team GP Elite | 4 | Ret | 4 | 7 | 7 | 3 | Ret | DNS | | | | | 63 |
| 10 | (Estonia) Thomas Kangro | (Belgium) RedAnt Racing with Porsche Estonia | 14 | 13 | 13 | 11 | Ret | DNS | 16 | 10 | 8 | 6 | 9 | 8 | 61 |
| 11 | (Netherlands) Jules Grouwels | (Belgium) Team RaceArt | 10 | 18 | 14 | 8 | Ret | 8 | 11 | 15 | 11 | 10 | 11 | 9 | 61 |
| 12 | (Estonia) Alexander Reimann | (Estonia) EST1 Racing | Ret | 8 | 11 | 9 | 14 | Ret | 8 | 11 | 9 | 7 | Ret | 14 | 58 |
| 13 | (Serbia) Nikola Miljković | (Serbia) Spark Racing Team | Ret | 15 | 15 | 17 | 9 | 7 | 14 | 8 | 10 | 13 | 7 | Ret | 54 |
| 14 | (Germany) Max Schlichenmeier | (Germany) cargraphic by Kurt Ecke Motorsport | Ret | Ret | 16 | 19 | 12 | 13 | 10 | 9 | 12 | 8 | 8 | 15 | 45 |
| 15 | (Finland) Jani Käkelä | (Finland) 39 Racing | 12 | 16 | 20† | 14 | 11 | 10 | 15 | 13 | 13 | 12 | 14 | 12 | 42 |
| 16 | (Finland) Henri Tuomaala | (Finland) Team Koiranen | 13 | 12 | 17 | 13 | Ret | 9 | 12 | 16 | | | 10 | 11 | 40 |
| 17 | (Bulgaria) Alexandra Vateva | (Belgium) Q1 Trackracing | 11 | Ret | 19 | 15 | 13 | 12 | 17 | 14 | | | | | 19 |
| 18 | (Belgium) Dréke Janssen | (Netherlands) Team GP Elite | Ret | Ret | | | | | | | | | 13 | 13 | 6 |
Guest drivers ineligible to score points
| — | (Belgium) Bertrand Baguette | (Belgium) D'ieteren Luxury Performance | 3 | **1** | | | | | | | | | | | – |
| — | (Netherlands) Hjelte Hoffner | (Netherlands) MDM Motorsport | 8 | 14 | | | | | | | | | | | – |
| — | (Netherlands) Hjelte Hoffner | (Netherlands) Team GP Elite | | | | | | | 7 | 7 | | | | | – |
| — | (Netherlands) Niels Troost | (Netherlands) Team GP Elite | | | 8 | Ret | | | | | | | | | – |
| — | (Germany) Colin Bönighausen | (Netherlands) Bas Koeten Racing | | | 10 | 10 | | | | | | | | | – |
| — | (Netherlands) Daan Van Kuijk | (Netherlands) Team GP Elite | Ret | 11 | | | | | | | | | | | – |
| — | (Belgium) Tomas de Backer | (Netherlands) JW Raceservice | 16 | 17 | | | | | | | | | | | – |
| — | (France) Cédric Chassang | (Netherlands) Team GP Elite | | | 18 | 16 | | | | | | | | | – |
| Pos | Driver | Team | (Belgium) SPA | | (Netherlands) ZAN1 | | (Hungary) HUN | | (Netherlands) ASS | | (Belgium) ZOL | | (Netherlands) ZAN2 | | Pts |

| Colour | Result |
|---|---|
| Gold | Winner |
| Silver | Second place |
| Bronze | Third place |
| Green | Points classification |
| Blue | Non-points classification |
| Blue | Non-classified finish (NC) |
| Purple | Retired, not classified (Ret) |
| Red | Did not qualify (DNQ) |
| Red | Did not pre-qualify (DNPQ) |
| Black | Disqualified (DSQ) |
| White | Did not start (DNS) |
| White | Withdrew (WD) |
| White | Race cancelled (C) |
| Blank | Did not practice (DNP) |
| Blank | Did not arrive (DNA) |
| Blank | Excluded (EX) |

**Bold** – Pole

Italics – Fastest Lap

† — Did not finish, but classified

=== Pro-Am ===
| Pos | Driver | Team | (Belgium) SPA | | (Netherlands) ZAN1 | | (Hungary) HUN | | (Netherlands) ASS | | (Belgium) ZOL | | (Netherlands) ZAN2 | | Pts |
|---|---|---|---|---|---|---|---|---|---|---|---|---|---|---|---|
| 1 | (Netherlands) Jules Grouwels | (Belgium) Team RaceArt | **1** | **3** | 2 | 1 | Ret | **1** | 1 | 2 | **1** | **1** | **2** | **1** | 260 |
| 2 | (Finland) Jani Käkelä | (Finland) 39 Racing | 2 | 2 | 5† | 3 | 1 | 3 | 2 | 1 | 2 | 2 | 3 | 3 | 226 |
| 3 | (Finland) Henri Tuomaala | (Finland) Team Koiranen | 3 | 1 | 3 | 2 | **Ret** | 2 | **3** | **3** | | | 1 | 2 | 184 |
Guest drivers ineligible to score points
| — | (Netherlands) Niels Troost | (Netherlands) Team GP Elite | | | **1** (Note: Niels Troost took pole position in the Pro-Am class for the round at Zandvoort 1, but he was ineligible to score points, so the pole position point was awarded to Jules Grouwels.) | **Ret** | | | | | | | | | – |
| — | (France) Cédric Chassang | (Netherlands) Team GP Elite | | | 4 | 4 | | | | | | | | | – |
| Pos | Driver | Team | (Belgium) SPA | | (Netherlands) ZAN1 | | (Hungary) HUN | | (Netherlands) ASS | | (Belgium) ZOL | | (Netherlands) ZAN2 | | Pts |

=== Rookie ===
| Pos | Driver | Team | (Belgium) SPA | | (Netherlands) ZAN1 | | (Hungary) HUN | | (Netherlands) ASS | | (Belgium) ZOL | | (Netherlands) ZAN2 | | Pts |
|---|---|---|---|---|---|---|---|---|---|---|---|---|---|---|---|
| 1 | (Poland) Milan Marczak | (Belgium) RedAnt Racing | 1 | **1** | 2 | 2 | 2 | 1 | **5** | DNS | **2** | 2 | 1 | 1 | 240 |
| 2 | (Andorra) Frank Porté Ruiz | (Belgium) Q1 Trackracing | 5 | 2 | **1** | **1** | **1** | **Ret** | 1 | **1** | 1 | **4** | **4** | **2** | 233 |
| 3 | (Netherlands) Mees Muller | (Netherlands) PG Motorsport | 3 | 3 | 3 | 4† | 3 | 2 | 3 | 4 | Ret | 3 | 3 | 3 | 185 |
| 4 | (Germany) Max Schlichenmeier | (Germany) cargraphic by Kurt Ecke Motorsport | Ret | Ret | 4 | 5 | 4 | 4 | 4 | 3 | 3 | 1 | 2 | 4 | 160 |
| 5 | (Bulgaria) Alexandra Vateva | (Belgium) Q1 Trackracing | 4 | Ret | 5 | 3 | 5 | 3 | 6 | 5 | | | | | 94 |
Guest drivers ineligible to score points
| — | (Netherlands) Hjelte Hoffner | (Netherlands) MDM Motorsport | **2** (Note: Hjelte Hoffner took pole position in the Rookie class for the round at Spa, but he was ineligible to score points, so the pole position point was awarded to Frank Porté Ruiz.) | 4 | | | | | | | | | | | – |
| — | (Netherlands) Hjelte Hoffner | (Netherlands) Team GP Elite | | | | | | | 2 | 2 | | | | | – |
| — | (Belgium) Tomas de Backer | (Netherlands) JW Raceservice | 6 | 5 | | | | | | | | | | | – |
| Pos | Driver | Team | (Belgium) SPA | | (Netherlands) ZAN1 | | (Hungary) HUN | | (Netherlands) ASS | | (Belgium) ZOL | | (Netherlands) ZAN2 | | Pts |

=== Teams ===
| Pos | Team | Pts |
|---|---|---|
| 1 | (Belgium) Team RaceArt | 420 |
| 2 | (Belgium) RedAnt Racing | 276 |
| 3 | (Netherlands) PG Motorsport | 228 |
| 4 | (Belgium) NGT Racing | 186 |
| 5 | (Belgium) Q1 Trackracing | 129 |
| 6 | (Netherlands) Team GP Elite | 69 |
| 7 | (Belgium) RedAnt Racing with Porsche Estonia | 63 |
| 8 | (Estonia) EST1 Racing | 59 |
| 9 | (Serbia) Spark Racing Team | 56 |
| 10 | (Germany) cargraphic by Kurt Ecke Motorsport | 46 |
| 11 | (Finland) 39 Racing | 44 |
| 12 | (Finland) Team Koiranen | 43 |
