= Alexandra Vateva =

Bulgarian racing driver (born 2004)

- Александра Вътева
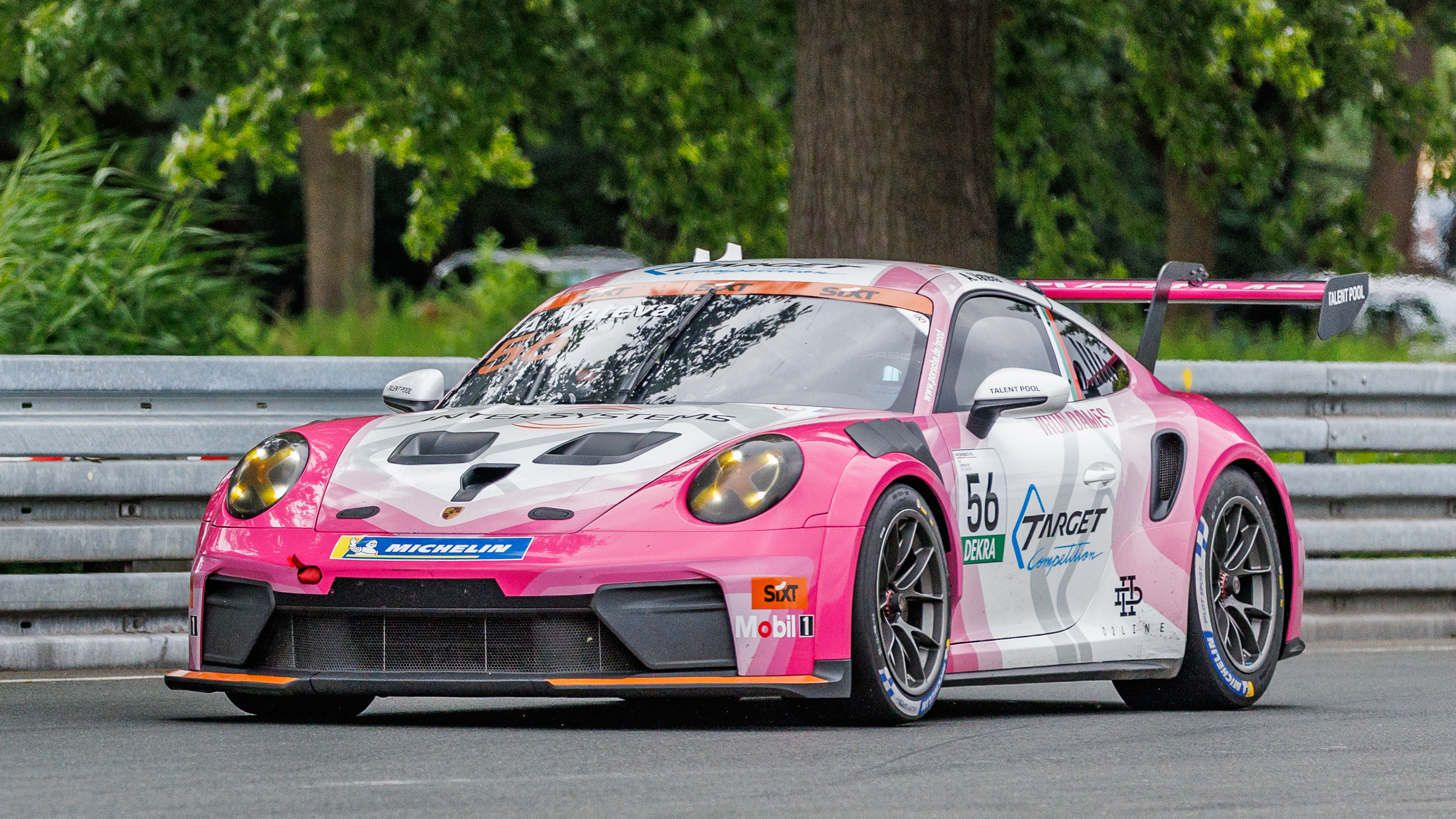
- Vateva in 2026
- Born: Alexandra Vateva; 23 February 2004 (age 22); Sofia, Bulgaria
- Nationality: (Bulgaria) Bulgarian

Porsche Carrera Cup Benelux career
- Debut season: 2025
- Current team: Target Competition
- Car number: 56
- Former teams: Team Proton Huber Competition
- Starts: 20
- Wins: 0
- Podiums: 0
- Poles: 0
- Fastest laps: 0
- Best finish: 30th in 2026

Previous series
- 2025 2023–24 2024–25: Porsche Carrera Cup Benelux; Porsche Endurance Challenge Deutschland; Porsche Carrera Cup Middle East
- Statistics up to date as of 16 October 2026.

Alexandra Vateva (born 23 February 2004) is a Bulgarian racing driver who last competed in Porsche Carrera Cup Germany for Target Competition.

== Career ==
Vateva began karting in 2021, racing in both the Bulgarian and Romanian karting championships, before stepping up to car racing in 2023 in Porsche Sports Cup Germany for Overdrive Racing alongside Pavel Lefterov. She won in the GT4 class on debut at the Hockenheimring and finishing second in race two, before taking her second and final class win of the season at the season-ending round at the same venue. During 2023, Vateva also competed for the same team in the GTC Race championship at the Nürburgring.

The following year, Vateva switched to Laptime Performance for her sophomore season in Porsche Sports Cup Germany. Racing in the GT3 class, Vateva scored her only win of the season at the Hockenheimring alongside Robert de Haan on her way to third in the Endurance Challenge standings. During 2024, Vateva also made a one-off appearance in the Porsche Sprint Challenge Benelux at Spa, winning overall in race two and taking a class win in race one. At the end of 2024, Vateva competed in the 2024–25 Porsche Carrera Cup Middle East for AV Racing in the Pro-Am class. Finishing on the Pro-Am podium on her debut round in Bahrain, Vateva then took six more class podiums in the following five rounds to end the season third in the Pro-Am standings.

Vateva then joined Q1 Trackracing to race in Porsche Carrera Cup Benelux, as part of Iron Dames' Supported by Iron Dames programme. Vateva finished 11th on her series debut at Spa, which turned out to be her best result of the season as she finished no higher than 12th in the following three rounds, before joining Team Proton Huber Competition to race in Porsche Carrera Cup Germany. Racing in the final two rounds of the season, Vateva most notably finished 19th on debut at the Red Bull Ring as the second-highest rookie in the race. During 2025, Vateva also participated in F1 Academy's rookie test held at Navarra, finishing 16th and 17th in the Morning and Afternoon sessions. At the end of the year, Vateva returned to the Porsche Carrera Cup Middle East for Splendid Racing, taking a best result of fourth twice and ending the season sixth in points.

For the rest of 2026, Vateva joined Target Competition for her first full-time season in Porsche Carrera Cup Germany. In her first full season in the series, Vateva took a lone points finish at the Red Bull Ring and ended the year 30th in the overall standings.

== Racing record ==
=== Racing career summary ===
| Season | Series | Team | Races | Wins | Poles | F/Laps | Podiums | Points | Position |
|---|---|---|---|---|---|---|---|---|---|
| 2023 | Porsche Endurance Challenge Deutschland – Class 2D | Overdrive Racing | | | | | | | |
| 2024 | Porsche Endurance Challenge Deutschland – Class 2D | Laptime Performance | 6 | 1 | 0 | 0 | 3 | 76 | **3rd** |
| 2024–25 | Porsche Carrera Cup Middle East | AV Racing | 12 | 0 | 0 | 0 | 0 | 94 | 7th |
| 2024–25 | Porsche Carrera Cup Middle East – Pro-Am | AV Racing | 12 | 0 | 0 | 2 | 7 | 170 | **3rd** |
| 2025 | Porsche Carrera Cup Benelux | Q1 Trackracing | 8 | 0 | 0 | 0 | 0 | 19 | 17th |
| 2025 | Porsche Carrera Cup Germany | Team Proton Huber Competition | 4 | 0 | 0 | 0 | 0 | 0 | 31st |
| 2025–26 | Porsche Carrera Cup Middle East | Splendid Racing | 8 | 0 | 0 | 0 | 0 | 75 | 6th |
| 2026 | Porsche Carrera Cup Germany | Target Competition | 16 | 0 | 0 | 0 | 0 | 1 | 30th |
| 2026 | Nürburgring Langstrecken-Serie – TCR | Sharky Racing | 2 | 1 | 0 | 0 | 1 | 4 | NC |

^{†} As Vateva was a guest driver, she was ineligible for points.

=== Complete Porsche Carrera Cup Middle East results ===
(key) (Races in bold indicate pole position) (Races in italics indicate fastest lap)

| Year | Team | 1 | 2 | 3 | 4 | 5 | 6 | 7 | 8 | 9 | 10 | 11 | 12 | DC | Points |
|---|---|---|---|---|---|---|---|---|---|---|---|---|---|---|---|
| 2024–25 | AV Racing | BHR1; 1; 11 | BHR1; 2; 8 | LUS; 1; 15 | LUS; 2; 5 | DUB; 1; 9 | DUB; 2; 8 | YAS; 1; 8 | YAS; 2; 8 | BHR2; 1; 6 | BHR2; 2; 10 | JED; 1; 4 | JED; 2; 5 | 7th | 94 |
| 2025–26 | Splendid Racing | BHR1; 1 Ret | BHR1; 2; 4 | LUS; 1; 6 | LUS; 2; 5 | DUB; 1; 5 | DUB; 2; 7 | YAS; 1; 6 | YAS; 2; 4 | | | | | 6th | 75 |

=== Complete Porsche Carrera Cup Benelux results ===
(key) (Races in bold indicate pole position) (Races in italics indicate fastest lap)

| Year | Team | 1 | 2 | 3 | 4 | 5 | 6 | 7 | 8 | 9 | 10 | 11 | 12 | DC | Points |
|---|---|---|---|---|---|---|---|---|---|---|---|---|---|---|---|
| 2025 | Q1 Trackracing | SPA; 1; 11 | SPA; 2 Ret | ZAN1; 1; 19 | ZAN1; 2; 15 | HUN; 1; 13 | HUN; 2; 12 | ASS; 1; 17 | ASS; 2; 14 | ZOL; 1 | ZOL; 2 | ZAN2; 1 | ZAN2; 2 | 17th | 19 |

^{*}Season still in progress.

=== Complete Porsche Carrera Cup Germany results ===
(key) (Races in bold indicate pole position) (Races in italics indicate fastest lap)

| Year | Team | 1 | 2 | 3 | 4 | 5 | 6 | 7 | 8 | 9 | 10 | 11 | 12 | 13 | 14 | 15 | 16 | DC | Points |
|---|---|---|---|---|---|---|---|---|---|---|---|---|---|---|---|---|---|---|---|
| 2025 | Team Proton Huber Competition | IMO; 1 | IMO; 2 | SPA; 1 | SPA; 2 | ZAN; 1 | ZAN; 2 | NOR; 1 | NOR; 2 | NÜR; 1 | NÜR; 2 | SAC; 1 | SAC; 2 | RBR; 1; 19 | RBR; 2; 22 | HOC; 1; 22 | HOC; 2; 23 | 31st | 0 |
| 2026 | Target Competition | IMO; 1; 21 | IMO; 2; 24 | RBR; 1; 15 | RBR; 2; 20 | SPA; 1; 25 | SPA; 2; 29 | ZAN; 1; 25 | ZAN; 2 Ret | LAU; 1; 21 | LAU; 2; 22 | NOR; 1; 23 | NOR; 2; 19 | NÜR; 1; 20 | NÜR; 2; 25 | HOC; 1; 20 | HOC; 2; 25 | 30th | 1 |

^{*}Season still in progress.
