= 2026 Porsche Carrera Cup Germany =

Motor racing championship

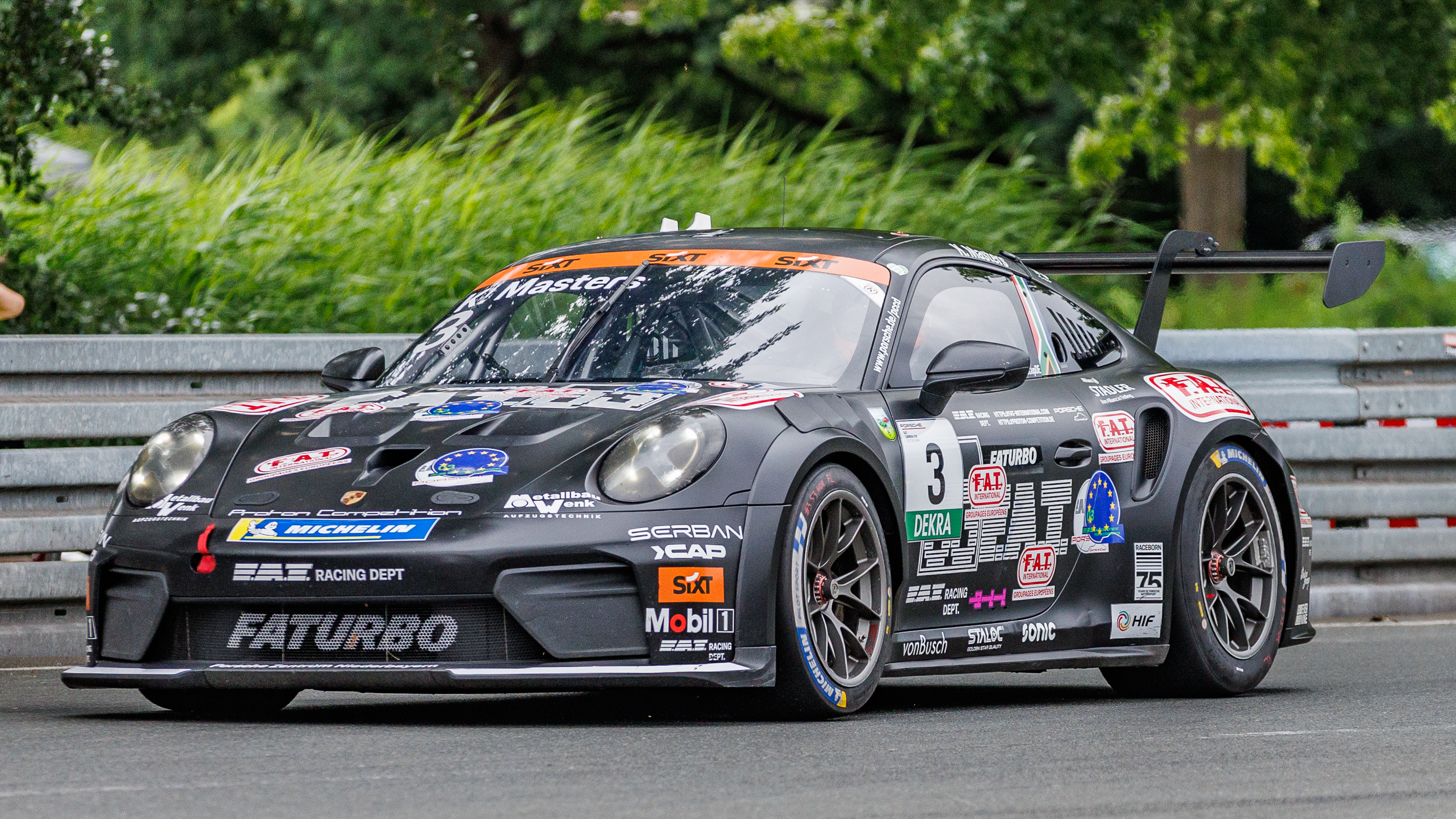
Keagan Masters won his first Drivers' Championship, while Proton Competition won the Teams' Championship.

The 2026 Porsche Sixt Carrera Cup Germany was the 41st season of the Porsche Carrera Cup Germany, a GT3 production one-make series sanctioned by Porsche Motorsports GmbH. The season began at Imola Circuit on 17 April and finished at Hockenheimring on 11 October.

The 2026 season was the first with the new Porsche 911 Cup (992.2), which is based on the 992.2 generation of the 911.

== Teams and drivers ==
Team	No.	Driver	Class	Rounds
(Germany) / Proton Competition (Note: Cars No. 3 and 99 entered as Proton Competition and cars No. 6, 17, and 88 entered as Team Proton.); (Germany) / Team Proton	1	(Netherlands) Robert de Haan	P	6–8
(Germany) / Proton Competition; (Germany) / Team Proton	2	(Sweden) William Siverholm	R	8
(Germany) / Proton Competition; (Germany) / Team Proton	3	(South Africa) Keagan Masters	P	All
(Germany) / Proton Competition; (Germany) / Team Proton	6	(Hong Kong) Dylan Yip	R	1–7
(Germany) / Proton Competition; (Germany) / Team Proton	17	(Sweden) Gustav Bergström	R	1–6, 8
(Germany) / Proton Competition; (Germany) / Team Proton	45	(Germany) Kai Pfister	PA	6, 8
(Germany) / Proton Competition; (Germany) / Team Proton	74	(Sweden) Lukas Sundahl	P	7
(Germany) / Proton Competition; (Germany) / Team Proton	88	(Sweden) Daniel Ros	P	1–6, 8
(Germany) / Proton Competition; (Germany) / Team Proton	96	(Poland) Milan Marczak	P	7
(Germany) / Proton Competition; (Germany) / Team Proton	99	(Finland) Marcus Amand	P	1–5
(Netherlands) / GP Elite (Note: Cars No. 4, 5, 23, and 36 entered as GP Elite and cars No. 7, 25, 27, and 98 entered as Team GP Elite.); (Netherlands) / Team GP Elite	4	(Germany) Jonas Greif	P	All
(Netherlands) / GP Elite; (Netherlands) / Team GP Elite	5	(Germany) Sören Spreng	PA	All
(Netherlands) / GP Elite; (Netherlands) / Team GP Elite	7	(Netherlands) Niels Troost	PA	4
(Netherlands) / GP Elite; (Netherlands) / Team GP Elite	23	(Australia) Samer Shahin	PA	1–4
(Netherlands) / GP Elite; (Netherlands) / Team GP Elite	25	(Netherlands) Wouter Boerekamps	P	All
(Netherlands) / GP Elite; (Netherlands) / Team GP Elite	27	(Brazil) Matheus Ferreira	P	All
(Netherlands) / GP Elite; (Netherlands) / Team GP Elite	36	(Vietnam) Hoàng Đạt Sawer	R	5
(Netherlands) / GP Elite; (Netherlands) / Team GP Elite	46	(Germany) Maik Rosenberg	PA	8
(Netherlands) / GP Elite; (Netherlands) / Team GP Elite	69	(Poland) David Dziwok	R	7
(Netherlands) / GP Elite; (Netherlands) / Team GP Elite	98	(Netherlands) Nick Ho	R	All
(Germany) Laptime Performance	10	(Netherlands) Niels Langeveld	P	All
(Germany) Laptime Performance	31	(Germany) Sebastian Freymuth	P	All
(France) Schumacher CLRT	11	(Luxembourg) Chester Kieffer	R	All
(France) Schumacher CLRT	12	(Netherlands) Flynt Schuring	P	All
(Italy) / Target (Note: Cars No. 13, 14, 28 and 95 entered as Target and cars No. 16 and 56 entered as Target Competition.); (Italy) / Target Competition	13	(Germany) Alexander Tauscher	P	All
(Italy) / Target; (Italy) / Target Competition	14	(Australia) Caleb Sumich	R	All
(Italy) / Target; (Italy) / Target Competition	16	(Germany) Max Mutschlechner	R	All
(Italy) / Target; (Italy) / Target Competition	28	(Italy) Aldo Festante	P	1, 3–4
(Italy) / Target; (Italy) / Target Competition	56	(Bulgaria) Alexandra Vateva	R	All
(Italy) / Target; (Italy) / Target Competition	95	(United Kingdom) Joseph Warhurst	P	All
(Germany) ID Racing	22	(United Kingdom) 'Rey King'	PA	1–3, 7
(Germany) ID Racing	43	(Czech Republic) Matyas Faiereisl	R	7
(Germany) ID Racing	44	(Germany) Theo Oeverhaus	P	All
(Germany) ID Racing	84	(Kuwait) Ahmad Alshehab	PA	3–5
(Poland) Forch Racing by Atlas Ward	23	(Australia) Samer Shahin	PA	7
(Poland) Forch Racing by Atlas Ward	40	(Germany) Janne Stiak	P	8
(Poland) Forch Racing by Atlas Ward	57	(United Kingdom) Gustav Burton	P	1–6
(Poland) Forch Racing by Atlas Ward	66	(Germany) Montego Maassen	R	All
(Poland) Forch Racing by Atlas Ward	77	(France) Louis Perrot	P	1–6
(Poland) Forch Racing by Atlas Ward	99	(Finland) Marcus Amand	P	7
(Germany) Looping by CarTech	32	(Germany) Tim Reiter	P	All
(Germany) Looping by CarTech	34	(Netherlands) Dirk Schouten	P	All
(Germany) Looping by CarTech	92	(Germany) Georg Griesemann	PA	7
(Germany) Team 75 Bernhard	54	(Germany) Michael Essmann	PA	All
(Germany) Team 75 Bernhard	65	(Netherlands) Sam Jongejan	R	All
(Germany) Team 75 Bernhard	91	(Germany) Gian Luca Tüccaroglu	P	All

Icon	Class
P	Pro Cup
PA	Pro-Am Cup
R	Rookie
	Guest Starter

== Calendar ==
The calendar was revealed on 14 October 2025, featuring eight rounds.

Round	Circuit	Date	Map of circuit locations
1	Imola Circuit, Imola, Italy	17–19 April	2026 Porsche Carrera Cup Germany is located in Europe
2	Red Bull Ring, Spielberg, Austria	24–26 April	2026 Porsche Carrera Cup Germany is located in Europe
3	Circuit de Spa-Francorchamps, Stavelot, Belgium	15–17 May	2026 Porsche Carrera Cup Germany is located in Europe
4	Circuit Zandvoort, Zandvoort, Netherlands	22–24 May	2026 Porsche Carrera Cup Germany is located in Europe
5	Lausitzring, Klettwitz, Germany	19–21 June	2026 Porsche Carrera Cup Germany is located in Europe
6	Norisring, Nuremberg, Germany	3–5 July	2026 Porsche Carrera Cup Germany is located in Europe
7	Nürburgring, Nürburg, Germany	14–16 August	2026 Porsche Carrera Cup Germany is located in Europe
8	Hockenheimring, Hockenheim, Germany	9–11 October	2026 Porsche Carrera Cup Germany is located in Europe

== Race results ==
Round		Circuit	Pole position	Overall winner	Rookie winner	Pro-Am winner
1	R1	(Italy) Imola Circuit	(Germany) Theo Oeverhaus	(Germany) Theo Oeverhaus	(Luxembourg) Chester Kieffer	(Australia) Samer Shahin
1	R2	(Italy) Imola Circuit	(Germany) Theo Oeverhaus	(Germany) Theo Oeverhaus	(Netherlands) Sam Jongejan	(Germany) Sören Spreng
2	R1	(Austria) Red Bull Ring	(Germany) Alexander Tauscher	(Finland) Marcus Amand	(Netherlands) Nick Ho	(Germany) Sören Spreng
2	R2	(Austria) Red Bull Ring	(Netherlands) Flynt Schuring	(Netherlands) Flynt Schuring	(Luxembourg) Chester Kieffer	(Germany) Sören Spreng
3	R1	(Belgium) Circuit de Spa-Francorchamps	(Netherlands) Flynt Schuring	(Netherlands) Flynt Schuring	(Luxembourg) Chester Kieffer	(Germany) Sören Spreng
3	R2	(Belgium) Circuit de Spa-Francorchamps	(Netherlands) Flynt Schuring	(Netherlands) Flynt Schuring	(Luxembourg) Chester Kieffer	(Germany) Michael Essmann
4	R1	(Netherlands) Circuit Zandvoort	(Germany) Alexander Tauscher	(Netherlands) Flynt Schuring	(Luxembourg) Chester Kieffer	(Netherlands) Niels Troost
4	R2	(Netherlands) Circuit Zandvoort	(Germany) Alexander Tauscher	(Germany) Alexander Tauscher	(Luxembourg) Chester Kieffer	(Netherlands) Niels Troost
5	R1	(Germany) Lausitzring	(Netherlands) Flynt Schuring	(South Africa) Keagan Masters	(Netherlands) Sam Jongejan	(Germany) Sören Spreng
5	R2	(Germany) Lausitzring	(Netherlands) Flynt Schuring	(South Africa) Keagan Masters	(Netherlands) Sam Jongejan	(Germany) Sören Spreng
6	R1	(Germany) Norisring	(United Kingdom) Gustav Burton	(United Kingdom) Gustav Burton	(Sweden) Gustav Bergström	(Germany) Michael Essmann
6	R2	(Germany) Norisring	(Netherlands) Flynt Schuring	(Netherlands) Flynt Schuring	(Netherlands) Sam Jongejan	(Germany) Michael Essmann
7	R1	(Germany) Nürburgring	(Netherlands) Robert de Haan	(Netherlands) Robert de Haan	(Luxembourg) Chester Kieffer	(Germany) Michael Essmann
7	R2	(Germany) Nürburgring	(Germany) Alexander Tauscher	(Luxembourg) Chester Kieffer	(Luxembourg) Chester Kieffer	(Germany) Sören Spreng
8	R1	(Germany) Hockenheimring	(Luxembourg) Chester Kieffer	(Luxembourg) Chester Kieffer	(Luxembourg) Chester Kieffer	(Germany) Kai Pfister
8	R2	(Germany) Hockenheimring	(Luxembourg) Chester Kieffer	(Netherlands) Niels Langeveld	(Netherlands) Sam Jongejan	(Germany) Michael Essmann

== Championship standings ==
=== Scoring system ===
Position	1st	2nd	3rd	4th	5th	6th	7th	8th	9th	10th	11th	12th	13th	14th	15th
Points	25	20	16	13	11	10	9	8	7	6	5	4	3	2	1

=== Overall ===
Pos	Driver	Team	IMO (Italy)		RBR (Austria)		SPA (Belgium)		ZAN (Netherlands)		LAU (Germany)		NOR (Germany)		NÜR (Germany)		HOC (Germany)		Pts
Pos	Driver	Team	R1	R2	R3	R4	R5	R6	R7	R8	R9	R10	R11	R12	R13	R14	R15	R16	Pts
1	(South Africa) Keagan Masters	(Germany) Proton Competition	3	2	2	2	Ret	8	4	6	1	1	2	2	16	4	4	9	230
2	(Netherlands) Flynt Schuring	(France) Schumacher CLRT	Ret	Ret	10	1	1	1	1	2	3	Ret	3	1	7	5	7	11	217
3	(Germany) Theo Oeverhaus	(Germany) ID Racing	1	1	19	6	2	2	7	3	4	2	8	7	18	8	5	6	204
4	(Germany) Alexander Tauscher	(Italy) Target	2	3	3	4	4	3	2	1	5	Ret	12	5	2	15	6	10	202
5	(Brazil) Matheus Ferreira	(Netherlands) Team GP Elite	4	4	5	7	3	6	8	5	7	3	5	3	9	7	16	8	167
6	(Finland) Marcus Amand	(Germany) Proton Competition	6	8	1	3	11	17	6	7	2	Ret							140
6	(Finland) Marcus Amand	(Poland) Forch Racing by Atlas Ward													3	2			140
7	(Netherlands) Wouter Boerekamps	(Netherlands) Team GP Elite	10	7	Ret	8	5	Ret	13	4	17	7	9	6	12	10	2	3	124
8	(Luxembourg) Chester Kieffer	(France) Schumacher CLRT	7	Ret	Ret	16	8	5	3	12	25	Ret	11	8	5	1	1	16	123
9	(Netherlands) Sam Jongejan	(Germany) Team 75 Bernhard	15	5	12	22	21	9	14	14	6	5	Ret	4	8	3	9	12	98
10	(Netherlands) Dirk Schouten	(Germany) Looping by CarTech	8	6	Ret	10	7	12	12	13	9	6	Ret	14	4	6	10	Ret	94
11	(Netherlands) Niels Langeveld	(Germany) Laptime Performance	26†	10	4	9	9	7	11	25	20	24†	4	Ret	19	Ret	17	1	86
12	(United Kingdom) Joseph Warhurst	(Italy) Target	9	14	20	5	12	10	5	8	8	9	6	Ret	10	14	15	19	83
13	(United Kingdom) Gustav Burton	(Poland) Forch Racing by Atlas Ward	11	9	18	11	6	4	15	Ret	18	13	1	18					71
14	(Netherlands) Robert de Haan	(Germany) Proton Competition											Ret	10	1	22	3	4	60
15	(Germany) Sebastian Freymuth	(Germany) Laptime Performance	Ret	17	24	14	18	14	17	10	Ret	15	Ret	11	13	11	8	2	53
16	(Sweden) Daniel Ros	(Germany) Team Proton	13	11	21	12	14	16	24	9	13	4	10	9			Ret	15	53
17	(Australia) Caleb Sumich	(Italy) Target	17	12	Ret	28	19	15	10	17	10	8	24†	Ret	6	9	Ret	17	44
18	(Germany) Gian Luca Tüccaroglu	(Germany) Team 75 Bernhard	18	Ret	Ret	13	12	30	16	Ret	11	11	Ret	15	11	13	21	7	36
19	(France) Louis Perrot	(Poland) Forch Racing by Atlas Ward	27†	28†	6	15	10	11	18	11	19	12	15	23					32
20	(Sweden) Gustav Bergström	(Germany) Team Proton	20	19	7	17	22	20	22	20	Ret	Ret	7	13			13	14	26
21	(Germany) Montego Maassen	(Poland) Forch Racing by Atlas Ward	12	13	9	29†	16	19	21	15	Ret	18	14	Ret	14	26	Ret	23	21
22	(Germany) Janne Stiak	(Poland) Forch Racing by Atlas Ward															11	5	16
23	(Hong Kong) Dylan Yip	(Germany) Team Proton	14	15	11	30†	24	Ret	20	Ret	12	16	13	25	17	16			16
24	(Netherlands) Nick Ho	(Netherlands) Team GP Elite	19	16	8	24	15	18	19	23	14	17	17	16	29	30†	14	13	15
25	(Germany) Jonas Greif	(Netherlands) GP Elite	16	20	13	19	Ret	23	23	16	16	10	19	17	21	19	19	Ret	10
26	(Germany) Max Mutschlechner	(Italy) Target Competition	24	18	14	18	20	21	Ret	19	15	19	16	12	25	29†	18	20	7
27	(Poland) David Dziwok	(Netherlands) GP Elite													22	12			4
28	(Sweden) William Siverholm	(Germany) Team Proton															12	Ret	4
29	(Vietnam) Hoàng Đạt Sawer	(Netherlands) GP Elite									22	14							2
30	(Bulgaria) Alexandra Vateva	(Italy) Target Competition	21	24	15	20	25	29	25	Ret	21	22	23	19	20	25	20	25	1
31	(Poland) Milan Marczak	(Germany) Team Proton													15	Ret			1
32	(Germany) Sören Spreng	(Netherlands) GP Elite	29†	21	16	23	26	25	Ret	26	23	20	21	24	30†	20	23	26	0
33	(Germany) Tim Reiter	(Germany) Looping by CarTech	23	22	25	21	23	22	27	DNS	WD	WD	18	20	23	17	24	21	0
34	(Germany) Michael Essmann	(Germany) Team 75 Bernhard	28†	23	17	25	27	24	30	22	24	23	20	21	24	21	25	18	0
35	(Sweden) Lukas Sundahl	(Germany) Team Proton													Ret	18			0
36	(Kuwait) Ahmad Alshehab	(Germany) ID Racing					30	26	29	21	26	21							0
37	(Australia) Samer Shahin	(Netherlands) GP Elite	22	25	23	26	29	28	28	24									0
37	(Australia) Samer Shahin	(Poland) Forch Racing by Atlas Ward													26	24			0
38	(United Kingdom) 'Rey King'	(Germany) ID Racing	25	27†	22	27	28	27							Ret	27			0
39	(Germany) Maik Rosenberg	(Netherlands) GP Elite															Ret	22	0
40	(Czech Republic) Matyas Faiereisl	(Germany) ID Racing													28	23			0
Guest drivers ineligible to score points
—	(Italy) Aldo Festante	(Italy) Target	5	26			17	13	9	Ret									–
—	(Netherlands) Niels Troost	(Netherlands) Team GP Elite							26	18									–
—	(Germany) Kai Pfister	(Germany) Proton Competition											22	22			22	24	–
—	(Germany) Georg Griesemann	(Germany) Looping by CarTech													27	28			–
Pos	Driver	Team	IMO (Italy)		RBR (Austria)		SPA (Belgium)		ZAN (Netherlands)		LAU (Germany)		NOR (Germany)		NÜR (Germany)		HOC (Germany)		Pts

=== Rookie ===
Pos	Driver	Team	IMO (Italy)		RBR (Austria)		SPA (Belgium)		ZAN (Netherlands)		LAU (Germany)		NOR (Germany)		NÜR (Germany)		HOC (Germany)		Pts
Pos	Driver	Team	R1	R2	R3	R4	R5	R6	R7	R8	R9	R10	R11	R12	R13	R14	R15	R16	Pts
1	(Luxembourg) Chester Kieffer	(France) Schumacher CLRT	1	Ret	Ret	1	1	1	1	1	8	Ret	2	2	1	1	1	4	286
2	(Netherlands) Sam Jongejan	(Germany) Team 75 Bernhard	4	1	5	5	6	2	3	2	1	1	Ret	1	3	2	2	1	282
3	(Australia) Caleb Sumich	(Italy) Target	5	2	Ret	7	4	3	2	4	2	2	8	Ret	2	3	Ret	5	197
4	(Netherlands) Nick Ho	(Netherlands) Team GP Elite	6	5	2	6	2	4	4	7	4	6	6	5	11	10	5	2	189
5	(Germany) Montego Maassen	(Poland) Forch Racing by Atlas Ward	2	3	3	8	3	5	6	3	Ret	6	4	Ret	4	8	Ret	7	170
6	(Sweden) Gustav Bergström	(Germany) Team Proton	7	7	1	2	7	6	7	6	Ret	Ret	1	4			4	3	168
7	(Germany) Max Mutschlechner	(Italy) Target Competition	9	6	6	3	5	7	Ret	5	5	7	5	3	9	9	6	6	155
8	(Hong Kong) Dylan Yip	(Germany) Team Proton	3	4	4	9	8	Ret	5	Ret	3	6	3	7	6	5			143
9	(Bulgaria) Alexandra Vateva	(Italy) Target Competition	8	8	7	4	9	8	8	Ret	6	8	7	6	7	7	7	8	133
10	(Vietnam) Hoàng Đạt Sawer	(Netherlands) GP Elite									7	3							25
11	(Poland) David Dziwok	(Netherlands) GP Elite													8	4			21
12	(Sweden) William Siverholm	(Germany) Team Proton															3	Ret	16
13	(Czech Republic) Matyas Faiereisl	(Germany) ID Racing													10	6			16
14	(Poland) Milan Marczak	(Germany) Team Proton													5	Ret			11
Pos	Driver	Team	IMO (Italy)		RBR (Austria)		SPA (Belgium)		ZAN (Netherlands)		LAU (Germany)		NOR (Germany)		NÜR (Germany)		HOC (Germany)		Pts

=== Pro-Am ===
Pos	Driver	Team	IMO (Italy)		RBR (Austria)		SPA (Belgium)		ZAN (Netherlands)		LAU (Germany)		NOR (Germany)		NÜR (Germany)		HOC (Germany)		Pts
Pos	Driver	Team	R1	R2	R3	R4	R5	R6	R7	R8	R9	R10	R11	R12	R13	R14	R15	R16	Pts
1	(Germany) Michael Essmann	(Germany) Team 75 Bernhard	3	2	2	2	2	1	4	3	2	3	1	1	1	2	3	1	333
2	(Germany) Sören Spreng	(Netherlands) GP Elite	4†	1	1	1	1	2	Ret	5	1	1	2	3	4	1	2	4	318
3	(Australia) Samer Shahin	(Netherlands) GP Elite	1	3	4	3	4	4	2	4									173
3	(Australia) Samer Shahin	(Poland) Forch Racing by Atlas Ward													2	3			173
4	(United Kingdom) 'Rey King'	(Germany) ID Racing	2	4	3	4	3	3							Ret	4			107
5	(Kuwait) Ahmad Alshehab	(Germany) ID Racing					5	5	3	2	3	2							103
6	(Germany) Maik Rosenberg	(Netherlands) GP Elite															Ret	2	20
Guest drivers ineligible to score points
—	(Netherlands) Niels Troost	(Netherlands) Team GP Elite							1	1									–
—	(Germany) Kai Pfister	(Germany) Proton Competition											3	2			1	3	–
—	(Germany) Georg Griesemann	(Germany) Looping by CarTech													3	5			–
Pos	Driver	Team	IMO (Italy)		RBR (Austria)		SPA (Belgium)		ZAN (Netherlands)		LAU (Germany)		NOR (Germany)		NÜR (Germany)		HOC (Germany)		Pts

=== Teams ===
==== Scoring system ====
- Results for teams are awarded independently from the drivers' championship.
- Only the best two results count for teams fielding more than two entries.

Pos	Team	Pts
1	(Germany) Proton Competition	396
2	(France) Schumacher CLRT	346
3	(Netherlands) Team GP Elite	300
4	(Italy) Target	296
5	(Germany) ID Racing	205
6	(Poland) Forch Racing by Atlas Ward	166
7	(Germany) Laptime Performance	150
8	(Germany) Team 75 Bernhard	148
9	(Germany) Looping by CarTech	98
10	(Germany) Team Proton	93
11	(Netherlands) GP Elite	22
12	(Italy) Target Competition	20
Pos	Team	Pts
