= Matheus Ferreira =

Brazilian racing driver (born 2007)

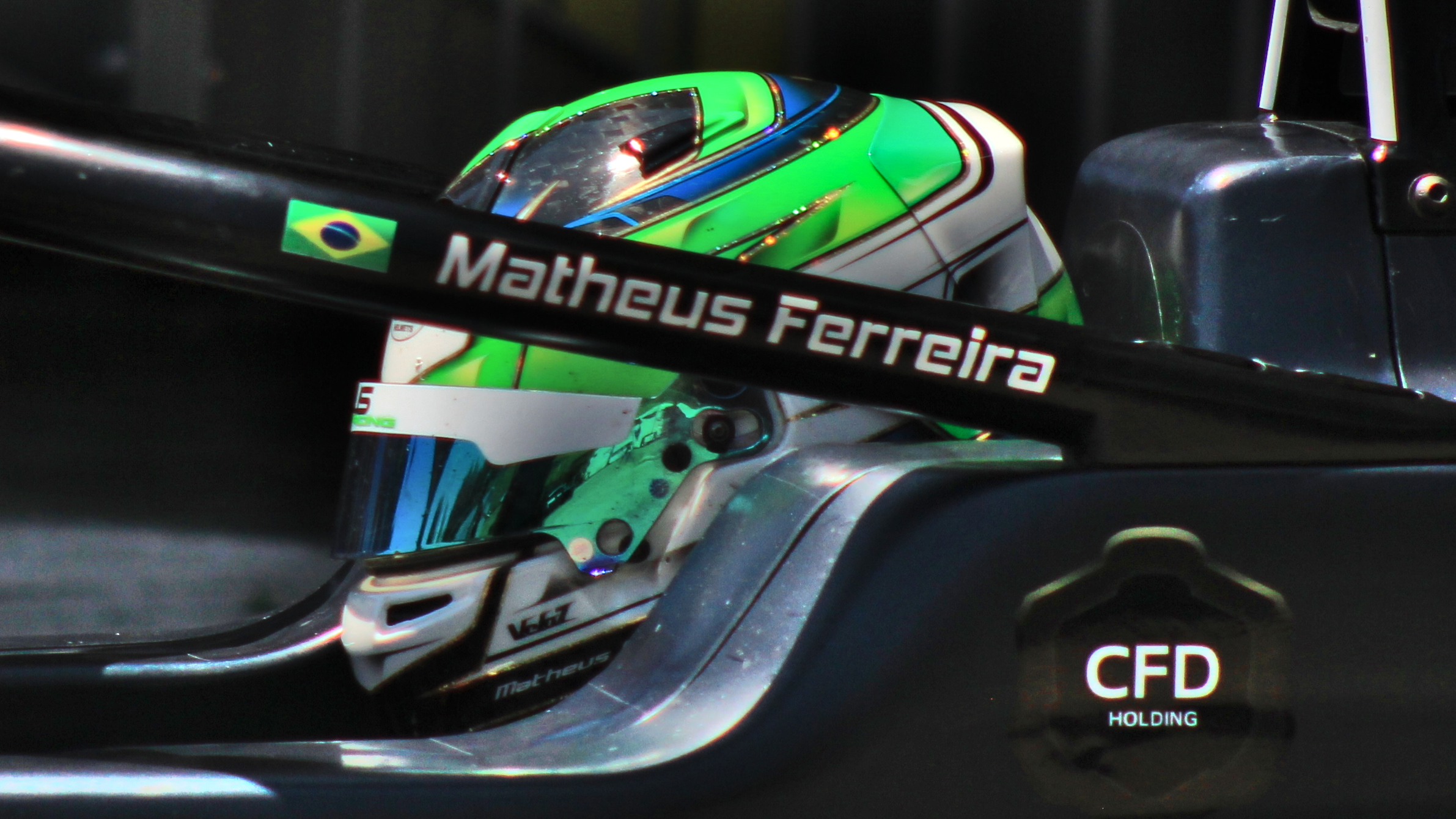
- Ferreira in 2024
- Nationality: (Brazil) Brazilian
- Born: 12 February 2007 (age 19) Brasília, Brazil

Porsche Carrera Cup Germany career
- Debut season: 2025
- Current team: Team GP Elite
- Car number: 27
- Former teams: Target
- Starts: 28
- Wins: 0
- Podiums: 3
- Poles: 0
- Fastest laps: 0
- Best finish: 15th in 2025

Previous series
- 2025; 2023–2024; 2024; 2023: Porsche Carrera Cup Italy; Italian F4 Championship; Formula Winter Series; F4 Brazilian Championship

Matheus Ferreira (born 12 February 2007) is a Brazilian racing driver who competes in the Porsche Supercup and the Porsche Carrera Cup Germany with Team GP Elite. He is a former member of the Alpine Academy.

== Junior racing career ==
=== Karting ===
Ferreira began karting in 2017 and moved up to the OKJ class two years later. In 2021, he came runner-up to both the WSK Super Master Series and the CIK-FIA European Championship. In his final full-time karting season and OK debut, he came runner-up to the 2022 Champions of the Future – Winter Series title.

=== Formula 4 ===
==== 2023 ====
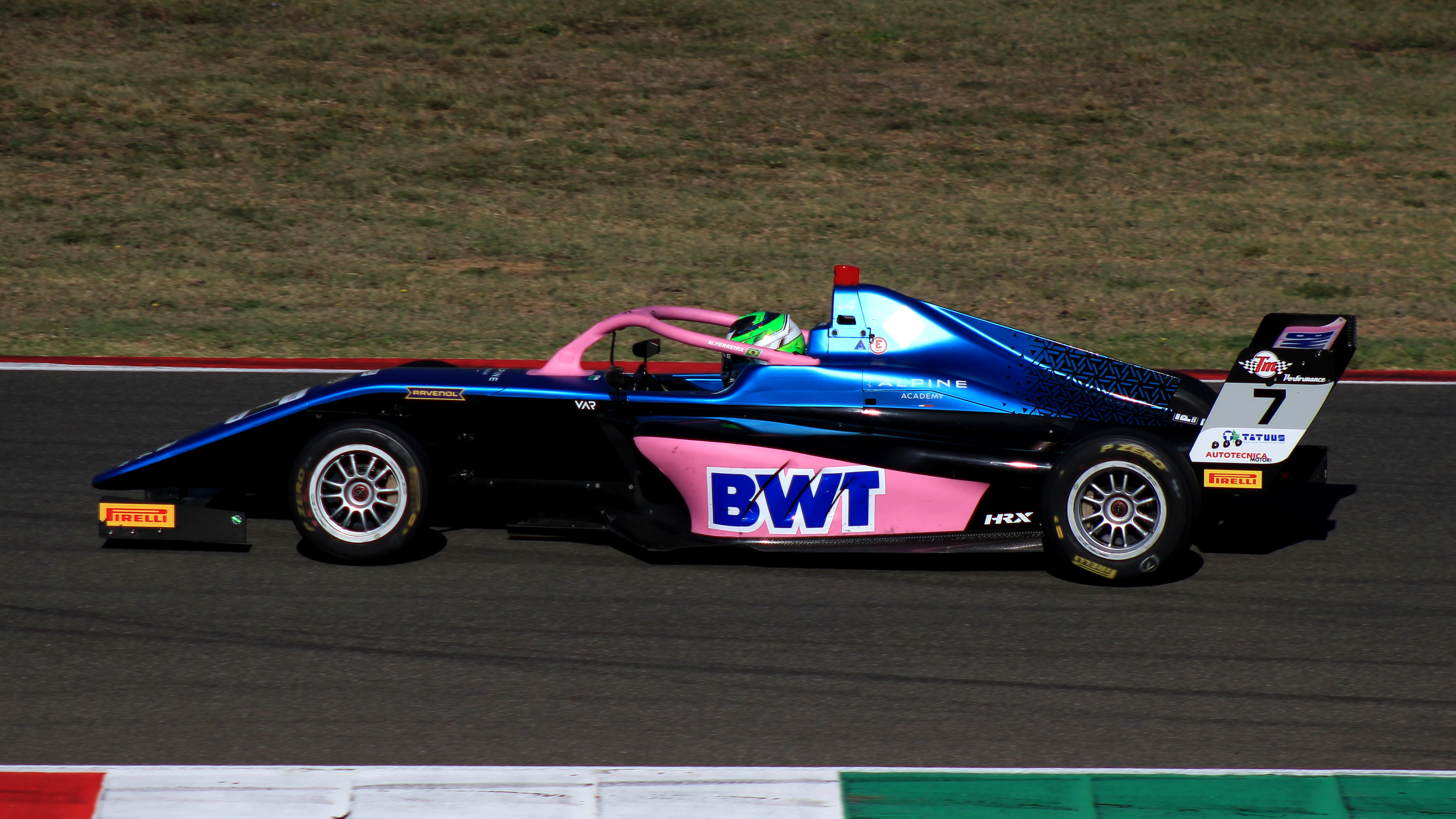
Ferreira at the 2023 Italian F4 Mugello round.

Ferreira made his Formula 4 debut in the Italian F4 Championship for Dutch outfit Van Amersfoort Racing. Ferreira had a difficult start to the season, where in the opening round at Imola Circuit, he was disqualified from the third race and retired from the fourth race. Ferreira had two more retirements later at Misano Circuit, but he was classified as finishing the first race due to running 90% of it. At Circuit de Spa-Francorchamps, he scored a seasons best result of fifth in the final race. Ferreira added two more points finishes to his tally at Monza and Paul Ricard before getting a final points finish of ninth during the penultimate round at Mugello.

Ferreira did a one-off cameo in the second-to-last round of the F4 Brazilian Championship at Interlagos for Oakberry Bassani F4 and claimed his maiden car racing win in the first and third races.

==== 2024 ====
Ferreira switched to US Racing in 2024, competing in the Formula Winter Series and the Italian F4 Championship. In the former he took a podium at Jerez and a win at Ricardo Tormo en-route to fifth in the standings.

Following a difficult start to his Italian F4 campaign, Ferreira bounced back at Vallelunga, collecting three consecutive points finishes. Two additional finishes in the points came in the following round at Mugello. Ferreira acquired his maiden podium during race one at Paul Ricard. After the races at Paul Ricard, Ferreira exited the series and thus concluded his Formula 4 career.

== Porsche Carrera Cup ==
=== Porsche Carrera Cup Germany ===
==== 2025 ====
Ferreira moved away from single-seater racing come 2025 and shifted towards Porsche Carrera Cup machinery, starting out in the Porsche Carrera Cup Germany for Target Competition. He secured a best result of eighth – twice – at the Nürburgring and the Red Bull Ring. Ferreira ended his debut season fifteenth in the standings.

==== 2026 ====
For the 2026 season, Ferreira switched to Team GP Elite. During the opening round at Imola, Ferreira finished fourth in both races.

=== Porsche Supercup ===
Alongside his campaign in Porsche Carrera Cup Germany, Ferreira contested the 2026 Porsche Supercup for the first time. His best result of the season was a sixth place in the fifth round at the Hungaroring. He ended his rookie season thirteenth in the standings.

== Formula One ==
Ferreira was part of the Alpine Academy from 2022 to 2023.

== Karting record ==
=== Karting career summary ===
Season	Series	Team	Position
2017	SKUSA SuperNationals - Micro Swift	Rolison Performance Group	8th
2019	WSK Super Master Series - OKJ	Lennox Racing Team	45th
2019	South Garda Winter Cup - OKJ	Lennox Racing Team	67th
2019	WSK Euro Series - OKJ	Lennox Racing Team	22nd
2019	Coupe de France - OKJ	Lennox Racing Team	21st
2019	CIK-FIA European Championship - OKJ	Lennox Racing Team	29th
2019	CIK-FIA World Championship - OKJ	Lennox Racing Team	38th
2019	WSK Open Cup - OKJ	Parolin Racing Kart	18th
2019	WSK Final Cup - OKJ	Parolin Racing Kart	11th
2020	WSK Champions Cup - OKJ	Forza Racing	NC
2020	WSK Super Master Series - OKJ	Forza Racing	24th
2020	WSK Euro Series - OKJ	DPK Racing	23rd
2020	Champions of the Future - OKJ	KR Motorsport	35th
2020	CIK-FIA World Championship - OKJ	KR Motorsport	25th
2021	WSK Champions Cup - OKJ	KR Motorsport	30th
2021	WSK Super Master Series - OKJ	KR Motorsport	2nd
2021	WSK Euro Series - OKJ	KR Motorsport	26th
2021	Champions of the Future - OKJ	KR Motorsport	18th
2021	CIK-FIA European Championship - OKJ	KR Motorsport	2nd
2021	CIK-FIA World Championship - OKJ	KR Motorsport	36th
2021	WSK Final Cup - OKJ	KR Motorsport	7th
2022	WSK Super Master Series - OK	KR Motorsport	17th
2022	Champions of the Future Winter Series - OK	KR Motorsport	2nd
2022	Champions of the Future - OK	KR Motorsport	28th
2022	CIK-FIA European Championship - OK	KR Motorsport	17th
2022	WSK Euro Series - OK	Energy Corse	13th
2022	CIK-FIA World Championship - OK	Energy Corse	34th

== Racing record ==
=== Racing career summary ===
Season	Series	Team	Races	Wins	Poles	F/Laps	Podiums	Points	Position
2023	Italian F4 Championship	Van Amersfoort Racing	21	0	0	0	0	15	18th
2023	F4 Brazilian Championship	Oakberry Bassani F4	3	2	0	1	2	57	11th
2024	Formula Winter Series	US Racing	8	1	0	1	2	75	5th
2024	Italian F4 Championship	US Racing	13	0	0	0	1	49	12th
2025	Porsche Carrera Cup Germany	Target	16	0	0	0	0	36	15th
2025	Porsche Carrera Cup Italy	Target Competition	4	0	0	0	0	16	23rd
2026	Porsche Sprint Challenge Southern Europe								
2026	Porsche Carrera Cup Germany	Team GP Elite	16	0	0	0	3	167	5th
2026	Porsche Supercup	Team GP Elite	8	0	0	0	0	43	13th

* Season still in progress.

=== Complete Italian F4 Championship results ===
(key) (Races in bold indicate pole position) (Races in italics indicate fastest lap)

Year	Team	1	2	3	4	5	6	7	8	9	10	11	12	13	14	15	16	17	18	19	20	21	22	DC	Points
2023	Van Amersfoort Racing	IMO; 1	IMO; 2; 12	IMO; 3 DSQ	IMO; 4 Ret	MIS; 1; 26†	MIS; 2 Ret	MIS; 3; 14	SPA; 1; 10	SPA; 2 Ret	SPA; 3; 5	MNZ; 1; 10	MNZ; 2; 13	MNZ; 3; 15	LEC; 1; 20	LEC; 2; 19	LEC; 3; 10	MUG; 1; 11	MUG; 2; 11	MUG; 3; 9	VLL; 1; 12	VLL; 2; 12	VLL; 3 Ret	18th	15
2024	US Racing	MIS; 1; 15	MIS; 2 Ret	MIS; 3; 11	IMO; 1; 11	IMO; 2 DNS	IMO; 3 WD	VLL; 1; 5	VLL; 2; 5	VLL; 3; 4	MUG; 1; 10	MUG; 2; 10	MUG; 3 Ret	LEC; 1; 3	LEC; 2 Ret	LEC; 3; 34†	CAT; 1	CAT; 2	CAT; 3	MNZ; 1	MNZ; 2	MNZ; 3		12th	49

=== Complete F4 Brazilian Championship results ===
(key) (Races in bold indicate pole position; races in italics indicate fastest lap)

Year	Team	1	2	3	4	5	6	7	8	9	10	11	12	13	14	15	16	17	18	DC	Points
2023	Oakberry Bassani F4	INT1; 1	INT1; 2	INT1; 3	INT2; 1	INT2; 2	INT2; 3	MOG; 1	MOG; 2	MOG; 3	GYN; 1	GYN; 2	GYN; 3	INT3; 1; 1	INT3; 2; 5	INT3; 3; 1	INT4; 1	INT4; 2	INT4; 3	11th	57

=== Complete Formula Winter Series results ===
(key) (Races in bold indicate pole position; races in italics indicate fastest lap)

Year	Team	1	2	3	4	5	6	7	8	9	10	11	12	DC	Points
2024	US Racing	JER; 1; 4	JER; 2; 6	JER; 3; 3	CRT; 1; 6	CRT; 2; 7	CRT; 3; 1	ARA; 1	ARA; 2	ARA; 3	CAT; 1 C	CAT; 2; 32†	CAT; 3 Ret	5th	75

=== Complete Porsche Carrera Cup Germany results ===
(key) (Races in bold indicate pole position) (Races in italics indicate fastest lap)

Year	Team	1	2	3	4	5	6	7	8	9	10	11	12	13	14	15	16	DC	Points
2025	Target	IMO; 1; 16	IMO; 2; 12	SPA; 1; 19	SPA; 2; 13	ZAN; 1; 20	ZAN; 2; 23	NOR; 1; 15	NOR; 2; 11	NÜR; 1; 8	NÜR; 2 Ret	SAC; 1; 18	SAC; 2; 16	RBR; 1; 20	RBR; 2; 8	HOC; 1; 17	HOC; 2; 12	15th	36
2026	Team GP Elite	IMO; 1; 4	IMO; 2; 4	RBR; 1; 5	RBR; 2; 7	SPA; 1; 3	SPA; 2; 6	ZAN; 1; 8	ZAN; 2; 5	LAU; 1; 7	LAU; 2; 3	NOR; 1; 5	NOR; 2; 3	NÜR; 1	NÜR; 2	HOC; 1	HOC; 2	5th*	143*

* Season still in progress.

=== Complete Porsche Supercup results ===
(key) (Races in bold indicate pole position; results in italics indicate fastest lap)

Year	Entrant	1	2	3	4	5	6	7	8	Rank	Points
2026	Team GP Elite	MON; 9	CAT; 18	RBR; 10	SPA; 9	HUN; 6	ZND1; 10	ZND2; 11	MNZ; 15	13th	43

* Season still in progress.
