= 2026 Porsche Carrera Cup North America =

Motor racing competition

The 2026 Porsche Carrera Cup North America was the sixth season of the Porsche Carrera Cup North America. It began on March 18 at Sebring International Raceway and finished on October 25 at Circuit of the Americas.

The 2026 season is the first with the new Porsche 911 Cup, which is based on the 992.2 generation of the 911.

== Teams and drivers ==
Team	No.	Driver	Class	Rounds
(United States) Czabok-Simpson Motorsport	3	(United States) Nikita Lastochkin (Note: Lastochkin is Russian, but he competed under an American licence in all rounds as Russian national emblems were banned by the FIA following the Russian invasion of Ukraine until 13 August 2026.)	P	All
(United States) ACI Motorsports	6	(United States) Alex Pratt	P	1–3, 5, 8
(United States) ACI Motorsports	18	(United States) Richard Edge	M	1, 4–7
(United States) ACI Motorsports	18	(United States) Ricco Shlaimoun	P	2
(United States) ACI Motorsports	39	(United States) John Jodoin	P	1, 3–8
(United States) ACI Motorsports	40	(Germany) Janne Stiak	P	All
(United States) ACI Motorsports	54	(United States) Patrick Mulcahy	PA	All
(United States) ACI Motorsports	74	(United States) Matt Smith	M	3–4, 6–8
(United States) ACI Motorsports	88	(Canada) Marco Cirone	M	All
(United States) GMG Racing	7	(United States) JCD Dubets	P	1–2
(United States) GMG Racing	14	(United States) James Sofronas	PA	1, 8
(United States) GMG Racing	32	(Australia) Tom Sargent	P	2
(United States) GMG Racing	32	(United States) Kyle Washington	M	6, 8
(United States) JDX Racing	9	(New Zealand) Callum Hedge	P	All
(United States) JDX Racing	23	(United States) Connor Bloum	P	1–2, 8
(United States) JDX Racing	37	(United States) Sabré Cook	P	All
(United States) JDX Racing	48	(United States) Frank Vitiello	M	6–7
(United States) JDX Racing	60	(United States) Kevin Stadtlander	M	1–5, 7–8
(United States) JDX Racing	60	(Australia) Lockie Bloxsom	P	6
(United States) JDX Racing	70	(United States) Joel Johnson	M	7–8
(United States) Kellymoss	24	(United States) Aaron Jeansonne	P	All
(United States) Kellymoss	29	(United States) Josh Conley	PA	1–5, 8
(United States) Kellymoss	57	(United States) John Goetz	M	1, 4–5, 7
(United States) Kellymoss	58	(United States) Steve Wetterau	PA	2, 8
(United States) Kellymoss	68	(United States) Chris Bellomo	M	1–5
(United States) Kellymoss	71	(United States) Paul Bocuse	P	All
(United States) Kellymoss	80	(United States) Kayden Kelly	M	1
(United States) Kellymoss	99	(United States) Alan Metni	P	All
(Canada) Scalzo Autosport	26	(Canada) Alain Scalzo	M	1, 4–5
(United States) van der Steur Racing	28	(United States) Brady Behrman	PA	1
(United States) Ruckus Racing	45	(United States) Scott Blind	M	All
(United States) JTR Motorsports Engineering	53	(United States) Rob Walker	M	1–2, 4–8
(United States) JTR Motorsports Engineering	96	(United States) Jared Thomas	P	All
(United States) Topp Racing	77	(United States) Tyler Maxson	P	All
(United States) Topp Racing	78	(United States) Cole Kleck	P	All
(United States) CHR	98	(United States) Dan Drohan	M	7–8

Icon	Class
P	Pro Cup
PA	Pro-Am Cup
M	Masters Cup
	Guest drivers ineligible to score points

== Calendar ==
The calendar was released on October 20, 2025, featuring eight rounds.

Round	Circuit	Date
1	Sebring International Raceway, Sebring, Florida	March 18–20
2	Long Beach Street Circuit, Long Beach, California	April 17–19
3	Miami International Autodrome, Miami Gardens, Florida	May 1–3
4	(New York (state)) Watkins Glen International, Watkins Glen, New York	June 25–27
5	Road America, Elkhart Lake, Wisconsin	July 30 – August 1
6	Indianapolis Motor Speedway, Speedway, Indiana	September 17–19
7	(Georgia (U.S. state)) Road Atlanta, Braselton, Georgia	September 30 – October 2
8	Circuit of the Americas, Austin, Texas	October 23–25

Race is part of ANDIAL Cup

== Race results ==
Round		Circuit	Pole position	Overall winner	Winning team	Pro-Am winner	Masters winner
1	R1	(Florida) Sebring International Raceway	(United States) Tyler Maxson	(United States) Tyler Maxson	(United States) Topp Racing	(United States) Patrick Mulcahy	(Canada) Marco Cirone
1	R2	(Florida) Sebring International Raceway	(United States) Tyler Maxson	(United States) Tyler Maxson	(United States) Topp Racing	(United States) Patrick Mulcahy	(Canada) Marco Cirone
2	R3	(California) Long Beach Street Circuit	(Australia) Tom Sargent	(Australia) Tom Sargent	(United States) GMG Racing	(United States) Patrick Mulcahy	(Canada) Marco Cirone
2	R4	(California) Long Beach Street Circuit	(Australia) Tom Sargent	(Australia) Tom Sargent	(United States) GMG Racing	(United States) Patrick Mulcahy	(United States) Rob Walker
3	R5	(Florida) Miami International Autodrome	(Germany) Janne Stiak	(United States) Tyler Maxson	(United States) Topp Racing	(United States) Patrick Mulcahy	(United States) Scott Blind
3	R6	(Florida) Miami International Autodrome	(New Zealand) Callum Hedge	Race cancelled due to adverse weather conditions, rescheduled to Road America			
4	R7	(New York (state)) Watkins Glen International	(United States) Tyler Maxson	(Germany) Janne Stiak	(United States) ACI Motorsports	(United States) Patrick Mulcahy	(United States) Matt Smith
4	R8	(New York (state)) Watkins Glen International	(United States) Tyler Maxson	(United States) Tyler Maxson	(United States) Topp Racing	(United States) Patrick Mulcahy	(United States) Matt Smith
5	R9	(Wisconsin) Road America	(United States) Tyler Maxson	(United States) Tyler Maxson	(United States) Topp Racing	(United States) Patrick Mulcahy	(Canada) Marco Cirone
5	R10	(Wisconsin) Road America	(New Zealand) Callum Hedge	(United States) Cole Kleck	(United States) Topp Racing	(United States) Patrick Mulcahy	(Canada) Marco Cirone
5	R6 (Note: Qualifying was held on May 2 in Miami. Because of an accelerated schedule due to forecasted adverse weather conditions, the race was cancelled and eventually rescheduled to be held at Road America on August 1.)	(Wisconsin) Road America	(New Zealand) Callum Hedge	(New Zealand) Callum Hedge	(United States) JDX Racing	(United States) Patrick Mulcahy	(United States) Scott Blind
6	R11	(Indiana) Indianapolis Motor Speedway	(United States) Tyler Maxson	(United States) Tyler Maxson	(United States) Topp Racing	(United States) Patrick Mulcahy	(United States) Richard Edge
6	R12	(Indiana) Indianapolis Motor Speedway	(United States) Aaron Jeansonne	(United States) Aaron Jeansonne	(United States) Kellymoss	(United States) Patrick Mulcahy	(Canada) Marco Cirone
7	R13	(Georgia (U.S. state)) Road Atlanta	(United States) Tyler Maxson	(United States) Tyler Maxson	(United States) Topp Racing	(United States) Patrick Mulcahy	(Canada) Marco Cirone
7	R14	(Georgia (U.S. state)) Road Atlanta	(United States) Tyler Maxson	(United States) Tyler Maxson	(United States) Topp Racing	(United States) Patrick Mulcahy	(Canada) Marco Cirone
8	R15	(Texas) Circuit of the Americas	(United States) Tyler Maxson	(Germany) Janne Stiak	(United States) ACI Motorsports	(United States) James Sofronas	(United States) Scott Blind
8	R16	(Texas) Circuit of the Americas	(United States) Tyler Maxson	(United States) Tyler Maxson	(United States) Topp Racing	(United States) Patrick Mulcahy	(United States) Scott Blind

== Championship standings ==
=== Points system ===
Championship points are awarded in each class at the finish of each event. Points are awarded based on finishing positions in the race as shown in the chart below.

Position	**1st**	**2nd**	**3rd**	**4th**	**5th**	**6th**	**7th**	**8th**	**9th**	**10th**	**11th**	**12th**	**13th**	**14th**	**15th**	Pole	FL
Points	25	20	17	14	12	10	9	8	7	6	5	4	3	2	1	2	1

For the Pro-Am and Masters championships, the lowest two race results before the final round are dropped. All pole position and fastest lap points are retained.

=== Overall ===
Pos	Driver	Team	SEB (Florida)		LBH (California)		MIA (Florida)		WGL (New York (state))		ELK (Wisconsin)			IMS (Indiana)		ATL (Georgia (U.S. state))		COT (Texas)		Pts
Pos	Driver	Team	R1	R2	R3	R4	R5	R6	R7	R8	R9	R10	R6	R11	R12	R13	R14	R15	R16	Pts
1	(United States) Tyler Maxson	(United States) Topp Racing	**1**	**1**	4	4	1	C	**9**	**1**	**1**	21	7	**1**	5	**1**	**1**	**3**	**1**	326
2	(United States) Aaron Jeansonne	(United States) Kellymoss	3	2	2	2	18	C	3	4	2	3	2	3	**1**	2	2	2	10	278
3	(Germany) Janne Stiak	(United States) ACI Motorsports	12	24	6	6	**10**	C	1	2	4	2	4	2	2	7	4	1	2	232
4	(New Zealand) Callum Hedge	(United States) JDX Racing	4	3	3	3	9	**C**	2	3	19	**7**	**1**	15	3	3	3	4	6	226
5	(United States) Jared Thomas	(United States) JTR Motorsports Engineering	2	19	7	5	3	C	4	6	3	4	3	6	4	4	5	5	3	209
6	(United States) Cole Kleck	(United States) Topp Racing	5	4	8	9	19	C	5	5	5	1	10	7	8	5	6	7	4	171
7	(United States) Paul Bocuse	(United States) Kellymoss	6	5	9	10	2	C	7	9	6	18	6	4	6	6	7	6	5	156
8	(United States) Alan Metni	(United States) Kellymoss	10	9	12	12	4	C	20	10	21	5	8	11	9	8	8	12	21	94
9	(United States) Sabré Cook	(United States) JDX Racing	25	6	10	11	14	C	6	7	7	17	5	16	12	9	9	13	22	85
10	(United States) Nikita Lastochkin	(United States) Czabok-Simpson Motorsport	13	8	16	13	5	C	8	8	10	12	15	9	10	10	11	14	12	84
11	(United States) John Jodoin	(United States) ACI Motorsports	9	11			8	C	18	14	8	7	11	8	15	11	10	9	7	81
12	(United States) Patrick Mulcahy	(United States) ACI Motorsports	8	13	13	15	6	C	10	11	9	8	16	10	19	12	14	11	11	70
13	(United States) Connor Bloum	(United States) JDX Racing	7	7	5	7												8	9	55
14	(Australia) Tom Sargent	(United States) GMG Racing			**1**	**1**														54
15	(Canada) Marco Cirone	(United States) ACI Motorsports	14	12	14	17	15	C	16	15	11	9	12	17	11	13	12	23	DNS	38
16	(United States) Scott Blind	(United States) Ruckus Racing	26	17	15	16	11	C	19	13	12	14	9	13	20	14	15	15	14	31
17	(United States) JCD Dubets	(United States) GMG Racing	11	10	11	8														25
18	(United States) Rob Walker	(United States) JTR Motorsports Engineering	16	14	22	14			21	22	13	10		14	13	15	13	16	15	23
19	(Australia) Lockie Bloxsom	(United States) JDX Racing												5	7					21
20	(United States) Richard Edge	(United States) ACI Motorsports	15	16					15	16	15	11		12	14	16	16			14
21	(United States) Alex Pratt	(United States) ACI Motorsports	19	20	18	23	16	C			18	13	14					19	8	13
22	(United States) Matt Smith	(United States) ACI Motorsports					13	C	11	12				19	18	18	18	22	DNS	12
23	(United States) Josh Conley	(United States) Kellymoss	22	25	20	21	7	C	14	17	22	20	DNS					24	19	11
24	(United States) James Sofronas	(United States) GMG Racing	17	18														10	13	9
25	(United States) Kevin Stadtlander	(United States) JDX Racing	24	26	23	22	12	C	17	21	20	15	13			22	22	20	20	8
26	(Canada) Alain Scalzo	(Canada) Scalzo Autosport	23	22					12	18	17	16								4
27	(United States) John Goetz	(United States) Kellymoss	20	23					13	19	16	22				17	19			3
28	(United States) Chris Bellomo	(United States) Kellymoss	18	21	21	19	17	C	22	20	14	19	DNS							2
29	(United States) Kayden Kelly	(United States) Kellymoss	DNS	15																1
30	(United States) Joel Johnson	(United States) JDX Racing														21	17	18	16	0
31	(United States) Kyle Washington	(United States) GMG Racing												18	16			21	WD	0
32	(United States) Steve Wetterau	(United States) Kellymoss			17	20												17	17	0
33	(United States) Frank Vitiello	(United States) JDX Racing												20	17	19	21			0
34	(United States) Ricco Shlaimoun	(United States) ACI Motorsports			19	18														0
35	(United States) Dan Drohan	(United States) CHR														20	20	25	18	0
36	(United States) Brady Behrman	(United States) van der Steur Racing	21	27																0
Pos	Driver	Team	SEB (Florida)		LBH (California)		MIA (Florida)		WGL (New York (state))		ELK (Wisconsin)			IMS (Indiana)		ATL (Georgia (U.S. state))		COT (Texas)		Pts

Colour	Result
Gold	Winner
Silver	Second place
Bronze	Third place
Green	Points classification
Blue	Non-points classification
Blue	Non-classified finish (NC)
Purple	Retired, not classified (Ret)
Red	Did not qualify (DNQ)
Red	Did not pre-qualify (DNPQ)
Black	Disqualified (DSQ)
White	Did not start (DNS)
White	Withdrew (WD)
White	Race cancelled (C)
Blank	Did not practice (DNP)
Blank	Did not arrive (DNA)
Blank	Excluded (EX)

**Bold** – Pole

Italics – Fastest Lap

† — Did not finish, but classified

=== Pro-Am ===
Pos	Driver	Team	SEB (Florida)		LBH (California)		MIA (Florida)		WGL (New York (state))		ELK (Wisconsin)			IMS (Indiana)		ATL (Georgia (U.S. state))		COT (Texas)		Pts
Pos	Driver	Team	R1	R2	R3	R4	R5	R6	R7	R8	R9	R10	R6	R11	R12	R13	R14	R15	R16	Pts
1	(United States) Patrick Mulcahy	(United States) ACI Motorsports	**1**	**1**	**1**	**1**	**1**	**C**	**1**	**1**	1	1	**1**	**1**	**1**	**1**	**1**	2	1	437
2	(United States) Josh Conley	(United States) Kellymoss	4	3	3	3	2	C	2	2	**2**	**2**	DNS					4	4	195
3	(United States) James Sofronas	(United States) GMG Racing	2	2														**1**	**2**	89
4	(United States) Steve Wetterau	(United States) Kellymoss			2	2												3	3	74
5	(United States) Brady Behrman	(United States) van der Steur Racing	3	4																31
Pos	Driver	Team	SEB (Florida)		LBH (California)		MIA (Florida)		WGL (New York (state))		ELK (Wisconsin)			IMS (Indiana)		ATL (Georgia (U.S. state))		COT (Texas)		Pts

=== Masters ===
Pos	Driver	Team	SEB (Florida)		LBH (California)		MIA (Florida)		WGL (New York (state))		ELK (Wisconsin)			IMS (Indiana)		ATL (Georgia (U.S. state))		COT (Texas)		Pts
Pos	Driver	Team	R1	R2	R3	R4	R5	R6	R7	R8	R9	R10	R6	R11	R12	R13	R14	R15	R16	Pts
1	(Canada) Marco Cirone	(United States) ACI Motorsports	**1**	**1**	**1**	3	4	**C**	5	**3**	1	1	2	**4**	**1**	**1**	**1**	7	DNS	327
2	(United States) Scott Blind	(United States) Ruckus Racing	8	5	2	2	**1**	C	**7**	2	**2**	**4**	1	2	7	2	3	**1**	**1**	304
3	(United States) Rob Walker	(United States) JTR Motorsports Engineering	3	2	4	**1**			8	9	3	2		3	2	3	2	2	2	247
4	(United States) Richard Edge	(United States) ACI Motorsports	2	4					4	4	5	3		1	3	4	4			161
5	(United States) Kevin Stadtlander	(United States) JDX Racing	7	9	5	5	2	C	6	8	8	5	3			10	10	4	5	153
6	(United States) Matt Smith	(United States) ACI Motorsports					3	C	1	1				6	6	6	6	6	DNS	120
7	(United States) Chris Bellomo	(United States) Kellymoss	4	6	3	4	5	C	9	7	4	7	DNS							108
8	(United States) John Goetz	(United States) Kellymoss	5	8					3	6	6	8				5	7			86
9	(Canada) Alain Scalzo	(Canada) Scalzo Autosport	6	7					2	5	7	6								70
10	(United States) Joel Johnson	(United States) JDX Racing														9	5	3	3	54
11	(United States) Dan Drohan	(United States) CHR														8	8	8	4	38
12	(United States) Frank Vitiello	(United States) JDX Racing												7	5	7	9			37
13	(United States) Kyle Washington	(United States) GMG Racing												5	4			5	WD	35
14	(United States) Kayden Kelly	(United States) Kellymoss	DNS	3																18
Pos	Driver	Team	SEB (Florida)		LBH (California)		MIA (Florida)		WGL (New York (state))		ELK (Wisconsin)			IMS (Indiana)		ATL (Georgia (U.S. state))		COT (Texas)		Pts

=== Teams' Championship ===
Pos	Team	Pts
1	(United States) Topp Racing	331
2	(United States) Kellymoss	301
3	(United States) ACI Motorsports	260
4	(United States) JDX Racing	252
5	(United States) JTR Motorsports Engineering	223
6	(United States) Czabok-Simpson Motorsport	162
7	(United States) Ruckus Racing	136
8	(United States) GMG Racing	108
9	(Canada) Scalzo Autosport	47
10	(United States) CHR	30
11	(United States) van der Steur Racing	14
