= 2024–25 Porsche Carrera Cup Middle East =

Motor racing competition

The 2024–25 Porsche Carrera Cup Middle East was the 2nd season of the Porsche Carrera Cup Middle East. The season began at Bahrain International Circuit on 31 October and finished at Jeddah Corniche Circuit on 20 April.

== Calendar ==
Round	Circuit	Date	Supporting	Map of circuit locations
2024				2024–25 Porsche Carrera Cup Middle East is located in Middle East
1	Bahrain International Circuit, Sakhir, Bahrain	31 October–2 November	FIA World Endurance Championship	2024–25 Porsche Carrera Cup Middle East is located in Middle East
2	Lusail International Circuit, Lusail, Qatar	29 November–1 December	Formula One World Championship; Formula 2 Championship; F1 Academy	2024–25 Porsche Carrera Cup Middle East is located in Middle East
2025				2024–25 Porsche Carrera Cup Middle East is located in Middle East
3	Dubai Autodrome, Dubai, United Arab Emirates	18–19 January		2024–25 Porsche Carrera Cup Middle East is located in Middle East
4	Yas Marina Circuit, Abu Dhabi, United Arab Emirates	25–26 January		2024–25 Porsche Carrera Cup Middle East is located in Middle East
5	Bahrain International Circuit, Sakhir, Bahrain	11–13 April	Formula One World Championship; Formula 2 Championship; FIA Formula 3 Championship	2024–25 Porsche Carrera Cup Middle East is located in Middle East
6	Jeddah Corniche Circuit, Jeddah, Saudi Arabia	18–20 April	Formula One World Championship; Formula 2 Championship; F1 Academy	2024–25 Porsche Carrera Cup Middle East is located in Middle East

== Entry list ==
Team	No.	Driver	Class	Rounds
(Saudi Arabia) Saudi Racing	3	(Saudi Arabia) Saud Al Saud	PA R	All
(Saudi Arabia) Saudi Racing	23	(Saudi Arabia) Khaled Alahmadi	PA	All
(Netherlands) Team GP Elite	5	(Germany) Sören Spreng	PA	1–5
(Netherlands) Team GP Elite	44	(Germany) Thomas Kiefer	PA	1
(Netherlands) Team GP Elite	72	(Kyrgyzstan) Stanislav Minskiy	M	2–4
(United Arab Emirates) Rabdan Motorsport	7	(United Arab Emirates) Saif Al Ameri	PA	1, 4–6
(Germany) Proton Huber Competition	10	(Sweden) Krister Andero	M	All
(Germany) Proton Huber Competition	34	(Oman) Shihab Al Habsi	PA	4
(Germany) Proton Huber Competition	52	(United Kingdom) Angus Whiteside	P	1–5
(Australia) Sumich Motorsport	14	(Australia) Caleb Sumich	P R	3–5
(Bahrain) DHL Team	14	(Australia) Caleb Sumich	P R	6
(Bahrain) DHL Team	40	(Germany) Janne Stiak	P R	1–5
(Canada) M3L Team	17	(Canada) Mark J. Thomas	M	1–2, 4–6
(Bulgaria) MVII Racing LLC	27	(Bulgaria) "Mike Mim"	M	All
(Italy) Enrico Fulgenzi Racing	44	(Italy) Alessandro Giannone	M	4
(Italy) Enrico Fulgenzi Racing	71	(Italy) Andrea Girondi	PA	4
(Austria) BWT Junior Racing	46	(Netherlands) Robert de Haan	P	5
(Austria) BWT Junior Racing	50	(United Kingdom) James Wallis	P R	6
(United Kingdom) Porsche Junior GB	50	(United Kingdom) James Wallis	P R	1–4
(Germany) CarTech Motorsport	55	(Germany) Colin Bönighausen	P R	1
(Bulgaria) AV Racing	56	(Bulgaria) Alexandra Vateva	PA R	All
(Japan) Seven x Seven Racing	66	(Japan) "Bankcy"	M	All
(Czech Republic) GT Sports Technology	85	(Czech Republic) Petr Brecka	M	All
(Qatar) QMMF	94	(Qatar) Ghanim Al-Maadheed	PA	2
(Qatar) QMMF	95	(Qatar) Ibrahim Al-Abdulghani	PA	2
(Qatar) QMMF	96	(Qatar) Abdulla Al-Khelaifi	PA	2

Icon	Class
P	Pro Cup
PA	Pro-Am Cup
M	Masters Cup
R	Rookie
	Guest Starter

== Results ==
Round		Circuit	Pole position	Fastest lap	Overall winner	Winning team	Pro-Am winner	Masters winner
1	R1	Bahrain International Circuit	(Germany) Janne Stiak	(Germany) Janne Stiak	(Germany) Janne Stiak	(Bahrain) DHL Team	(Saudi Arabia) Saud Al Saud	(Czech Republic) Petr Brecka
1	R2	Bahrain International Circuit	(Germany) Colin Bönighausen	(Germany) Janne Stiak	(Germany) Colin Bönighausen	(Germany) CarTech Motorsport	(Saudi Arabia) Saud Al Saud	(Bulgaria) "Mike Mim"
2	R1	(Qatar) Lusail International Circuit	(Germany) Janne Stiak	(Germany) Janne Stiak	(Germany) Janne Stiak	(Bahrain) DHL Team	(Saudi Arabia) Saud Al Saud	(Bulgaria) "Mike Mim"
2	R2	(Qatar) Lusail International Circuit	(Germany) Janne Stiak	(Germany) Janne Stiak	(Germany) Janne Stiak	(Bahrain) DHL Team	(Qatar) Abdulla Al-Khelaifi	(Japan) "Bankcy"
3	R1	(United Arab Emirates) Dubai Autodrome	(Germany) Janne Stiak	(United Kingdom) James Wallis	(Germany) Janne Stiak	(Bahrain) DHL Team	(Germany) Sören Spreng	(Japan) "Bankcy"
3	R2	(United Arab Emirates) Dubai Autodrome	(Germany) Janne Stiak	(Germany) Janne Stiak	(Germany) Janne Stiak	(Bahrain) DHL Team	(Saudi Arabia) Saud Al Saud	(Japan) "Bankcy"
4	R1	(United Arab Emirates) Yas Marina Circuit	(Germany) Janne Stiak	(Germany) Janne Stiak	(Germany) Janne Stiak	(Bahrain) DHL Team	(Saudi Arabia) Saud Al Saud	(Japan) "Bankcy"
4	R2	(United Arab Emirates) Yas Marina Circuit	(Germany) Janne Stiak	(Germany) Janne Stiak	(Germany) Janne Stiak	(Bahrain) DHL Team	(Saudi Arabia) Khaled Alahmadi	(Italy) Alessandro Giannone
5	R1	Bahrain International Circuit	(Netherlands) Robert de Haan	(Netherlands) Robert de Haan	(Netherlands) Robert de Haan	(Austria) BWT Junior Racing	(Saudi Arabia) Khaled Alahmadi	(Japan) "Bankcy"
5	R2	Bahrain International Circuit	(Netherlands) Robert de Haan	(Netherlands) Robert de Haan	(Netherlands) Robert de Haan	(Austria) BWT Junior Racing	(Saudi Arabia) Khaled Alahmadi	(Japan) "Bankcy"
6	R1	(Saudi Arabia) Jeddah Corniche Circuit	(Saudi Arabia) Khaled Alahmadi	(Australia) Caleb Sumich	(Australia) Caleb Sumich	(Bahrain) DHL Team	(Saudi Arabia) Saud Al Saud	(Bulgaria) "Mike Mim"
6	R2	(Saudi Arabia) Jeddah Corniche Circuit	(Australia) Caleb Sumich	(United Kingdom) James Wallis	(Australia) Caleb Sumich	(Bahrain) DHL Team	(Saudi Arabia) Khaled Alahmadi	(Japan) "Bankcy"

== Championship standings ==
=== Scoring system ===
Position	**1st**	**2nd**	**3rd**	**4th**	**5th**	**6th**	**7th**	**8th**	**9th**	**10th**	**11th**	**12th**	**13th**	**14th**	**15th**
Points	25	20	17	14	12	10	9	8	7	6	5	4	3	2	1

=== Overall ===
Pos.	Driver	Team	BHR1 (Bahrain)		LUS (Qatar)		DUB (United Arab Emirates)		YAS (United Arab Emirates)		BHR2 (Bahrain)		JED (Saudi Arabia)		Points
1	(Germany) Janne Stiak	(Bahrain) DHL Team	**1**	2	**1**	**1**	**1**	**1**	**1**	**1**	2	2			235
2	(United Kingdom) James Wallis	(United Kingdom) Porsche Junior GB	3	3	3	2	2	2	2	3					188
2	(United Kingdom) James Wallis	(Netherlands) BWT Junior Racing											2	2	188
3	(United Kingdom) Angus Whiteside	(Germany) Proton Huber Competition	4	4	2	4	3	3	4	4	4	3			155
4	(Australia) Caleb Sumich	(Australia) Sumich Motorsport					4	4	3	2	3	4			146
4	(Australia) Caleb Sumich	(Bahrain) DHL Team											1	**1**	146
5	(Saudi Arabia) Saud Al Saud	(Saudi Arabia) Saudi Racing	5	6	4	11	6	5	5	11	Ret	6	3	4	118
6	(Saudi Arabia) Khaled Alahmadi	(Saudi Arabia) Saudi Racing	6	7	6	6	7	7	6	5	5	5	**Ret**	3	111
7	(Bulgaria) Alexandra Vateva	(Bulgaria) AV Racing	11	8	15	5	9	8	8	8	6	10	4	5	94
8	(Japan) "Bankcy"	(Japan) Seven x Seven Racing	13	Ret	11	8	8	9	9	10	7	7	7	6	83
9	(Bulgaria) "Mike Mim"	(Bulgaria) MVII Racing LLC	10	5	8	10	11	11	12	17	9	8	5	7	78
10	(Czech Republic) Petr Brecka	(Czech Republic) GT Sports Technology	9	9	10	Ret	12	10	11	14	10	14	6	8	64
11	(Germany) Sören Spreng	(Netherlands) Team GP Elite	8	Ret	12	Ret	5	6	7	6	13	13			59
12	(Canada) Mark J. Thomas	(Canada) M3L Team	12	10	13	13			14	13	8	9	8	11	53
13	(Sweden) Krister Andero	(Germany) Proton Huber Competition	14	11	Ret	12	10	12	Ret	12	11	11	9	9	51
14	(Netherlands) Robert de Haan	(Netherlands) BWT Junior Racing									**1**	**1**			50
15	(Germany) Colin Bönighausen	(Germany) CarTech Motorsport	2	**1**											45
16	(Qatar) Abdulla Al-Khelaifi	(Qatar) QMMF			5	3									29
17	(United Arab Emirates) Saif Al Ameri	(United Arab Emirates) Rabdan Motorsport	15	12					Ret	15	12	12	10	10	28
18	(Qatar) Ghanim Al-Maadheed	(Qatar) QMMF			7	7									18
19	(Qatar) Ibrahim Al-Abdulghani	(Qatar) QMMF			9	9									14
20	(Kyrgyzstan) Stanislav Minskiy	(Netherlands) Team GP Elite			14	14	13	13	15	18					14
21	(Germany) Thomas Kiefer	(Netherlands) Team GP Elite	7	Ret											9
Guest drivers ineligible for points
—	(Oman) Shihab Al Habsi	(Germany) Proton Huber Competition							13	7					–
—	(Italy) Alessandro Giannone	(Italy) Enrico Fulgenzi Racing							10	9					–
—	(Italy) Andrea Girondi	(Italy) Enrico Fulgenzi Racing							16	16					–
Pos.	Driver	Team	BHR1 (Bahrain)		LUS (Qatar)		DUB (United Arab Emirates)		YAS (United Arab Emirates)		BHR2 (Bahrain)		JED (Saudi Arabia)		Points

Colour	Result
Gold	Winner
Silver	Second place
Bronze	Third place
Green	Points classification
Blue	Non-points classification
Blue	Non-classified finish (NC)
Purple	Retired, not classified (Ret)
Red	Did not qualify (DNQ)
Red	Did not pre-qualify (DNPQ)
Black	Disqualified (DSQ)
White	Did not start (DNS)
White	Withdrew (WD)
White	Race cancelled (C)
Blank	Did not practice (DNP)
Blank	Did not arrive (DNA)
Blank	Excluded (EX)

**Bold** – Pole
Italics – Fastest Lap
† — Did not finish, but classified
Rookie

=== Pro-Am ===
Pos.	Driver	Team	BHR1 (Bahrain)		LUS (Qatar)		DUB (United Arab Emirates)		YAS (United Arab Emirates)		BHR2 (Bahrain)		JED (Saudi Arabia)		Points
1	(Saudi Arabia) Saud Al Saud	(Saudi Arabia) Saudi Racing	**1**	**1**	1	6	**2**	**1**	1	5	Ret	**2**	1	**2**	224
2	(Saudi Arabia) Khaled Alahmadi	(Saudi Arabia) Saudi Racing	2	2	3	3	3	3	**2**	**1**	**1**	1	**Ret**	1	211
3	(Bulgaria) Alexandra Vateva	(Bulgaria) AV Racing	5	3	7	2	4	4	4	4	2	3	2	3	170
4	(Germany) Sören Spreng	(Netherlands) Team GP Elite	4	Ret	6	Ret	1	2	3	2	4	5			132
5	(United Arab Emirates) Saif Al Ameri	(United Arab Emirates) Rabdan Motorsport	6	4					Ret	6	3	4	3	4	98
6	(Qatar) Abdulla Al-Khelaifi	(Qatar) QMMF			**2**	**1**									45
7	(Qatar) Ghanim Al-Maadheed	(Qatar) QMMF			4	4									28
8	(Qatar) Ibrahim Al-Abdulghani	(Qatar) QMMF			5	5									24
9	(Germany) Thomas Kiefer	(Netherlands) Team GP Elite	3	Ret											17
Guest drivers ineligible for points
—	(Oman) Shihab Al Habsi	(Germany) Proton Huber Competition							5	3					–
—	(Italy) Andrea Girondi	(Italy) Enrico Fulgenzi Racing							6	7					–
Pos.	Driver	Team	BHR1 (Bahrain)		LUS (Qatar)		DUB (United Arab Emirates)		YAS (United Arab Emirates)		BHR2 (Bahrain)		JED (Saudi Arabia)		Points

=== Masters ===
Pos.	Driver	Team	BHR1 (Bahrain)		LUS (Qatar)		DUB (United Arab Emirates)		YAS (United Arab Emirates)		BHR2 (Bahrain)		JED (Saudi Arabia)		Points
1	(Japan) "Bankcy"	(Japan) Seven x Seven Racing	4	Ret	**3**	**1**	**1**	**1**	1	2	**1**	**1**	3	**1**	234
2	(Bulgaria) "Mike Mim"	(Bulgaria) MVII Racing LLC	2	1	1	2	3	3	4	6	3	2	**1**	2	206
3	(Czech Republic) Petr Brecka	(Czech Republic) GT Sports Technology	**1**	**2**	2	Ret	4	2	3	5	4	5	2	3	184
4	(Canada) Mark J. Thomas	(Canada) M3L Team	3	3	4	4			5	4	2	3	4	5	154
5	(Sweden) Krister Andero	(Germany) Proton Huber Competition	5	4	Ret	3	2	4	Ret	3	5	4	5	4	149
6	(Kyrgyzstan) Stanislav Minskiy	(Netherlands) Team GP Elite			5	5	5	5	6	7					70
Guest drivers ineligible for points
—	(Italy) Alessandro Giannone	(Italy) Enrico Fulgenzi Racing							**2**	**1**					–
Pos.	Driver	Team	BHR1 (Bahrain)		LUS (Qatar)		DUB (United Arab Emirates)		YAS (United Arab Emirates)		BHR2 (Bahrain)		JED (Saudi Arabia)		Points

=== Teams ===
Pos.	Team	Points
1	(Saudi Arabia) Saudi Racing	216
2	(Germany) Proton Huber Competition	192
3	(Netherlands) Team GP Elite	82
4	(Qatar) QMMF	47
