= 2025 Porsche Carrera Cup Germany =

2025 racing series

The 2025 Porsche Sixt Carrera Cup Germany was the 40th season of the Porsche Carrera Cup Germany. The season began at Imola Circuit on 18 April and finished at Hockenheimring on 5 October.

== Calendar ==
Round	Circuit	Date	Supporting	Map of circuit locations
1	Imola Circuit, Imola, Italy	18–20 April	FIA World Endurance Championship; GT4 Italy	2025 Porsche Carrera Cup Germany is located in Europe
2	Circuit de Spa-Francorchamps, Stavelot, Belgium	8–9 May	FIA World Endurance Championship; Porsche Carrera Cup Benelux	2025 Porsche Carrera Cup Germany is located in Europe
3	Circuit Zandvoort, Zandvoort, Netherlands	6–8 June	Deutsche Tourenwagen Masters; Formula Regional European Championship; Porsche Carrera Cup Benelux; ADAC GT Masters	2025 Porsche Carrera Cup Germany is located in Europe
4	Norisring, Nuremberg, Germany	4–6 July	Deutsche Tourenwagen Masters; ADAC GT4 Germany; Prototype Cup Germany; NXT Gen Cup	2025 Porsche Carrera Cup Germany is located in Europe
5	Nürburgring, Nürburg, Germany	8–10 August	Deutsche Tourenwagen Masters; ADAC GT4 Germany; Prototype Cup Germany; NXT Gen Cup	2025 Porsche Carrera Cup Germany is located in Europe
6	Sachsenring, Hohenstein-Ernstthal, Germany	22–24 August	Deutsche Tourenwagen Masters; ADAC GT4 Germany; NXT Gen Cup	2025 Porsche Carrera Cup Germany is located in Europe
7	(Germany) Red Bull Ring, Spielberg, Austria	12–14 September	Deutsche Tourenwagen Masters; ADAC GT Masters; ADAC GT4 Germany; Prototype Cup Germany	2025 Porsche Carrera Cup Germany is located in Europe
8	Hockenheimring, Hockenheim, Germany	3–5 October	Deutsche Tourenwagen Masters; Formula Regional European Championship; ADAC GT Masters; ADAC GT4 Germany	2025 Porsche Carrera Cup Germany is located in Europe

== Entry list ==
Team	No.	Driver	Class	Rounds
(Netherlands) GP Elite (Note: Cars No. 4, 5 and 31 entered as GP Elite and cars No. 24, 25 and 26 entered as Team GP Elite.) (Netherlands) Team GP Elite	2	(Belgium) Ghislain Cordeel	P	8
(Netherlands) GP Elite (Netherlands) Team GP Elite	4	(Germany) Jonas Greif	P	All
(Netherlands) GP Elite (Netherlands) Team GP Elite	5	(Germany) Sören Spreng	PA	All
(Netherlands) GP Elite (Netherlands) Team GP Elite	24	(Netherlands) Kas Haverkort	P	1–6
(Netherlands) GP Elite (Netherlands) Team GP Elite	25	(Israel) Ariel Levi	P	All
(Netherlands) GP Elite (Netherlands) Team GP Elite	26	(Netherlands) Huub van Eijndhoven	P	All
(Netherlands) GP Elite (Netherlands) Team GP Elite	30	(Netherlands) Wouter Boerekamps	P	7
(Netherlands) GP Elite (Netherlands) Team GP Elite	31	(Australia) Samer Shahin	PA	1–3, 6
(Netherlands) GP Elite (Netherlands) Team GP Elite	89	(Netherlands) Nick Ho	P	8
(Germany) Proton Huber Competition (Note: Cars No. 3, 21, 46, 65, 76 and 88 entered as Proton Huber Competition and cars No. 55 and 95 entered as Team Proton Huber Competition. Car 65 was entered as Proton Huber Competition in rounds 2 and 4 and as Team Proton Huber Competition in round 5) (Germany) Team Proton Huber Competition	3	(France) Marvin Klein	P	1–7
(Germany) Proton Huber Competition (Germany) Team Proton Huber Competition	6	(South Africa) Keagan Masters	P	8
(Germany) Proton Huber Competition (Germany) Team Proton Huber Competition	21	(Netherlands) Sacha Norden	R	All
(Germany) Proton Huber Competition (Germany) Team Proton Huber Competition	46	(Netherlands) Robert de Haan	P	All
(Germany) Proton Huber Competition (Germany) Team Proton Huber Competition	55	(Germany) Colin Bönighausen	P	1–4
(Germany) Proton Huber Competition (Germany) Team Proton Huber Competition	56	(Bulgaria) Alexandra Vateva	R	7–8
(Germany) Proton Huber Competition (Germany) Team Proton Huber Competition	65	(Germany) Kai Pfister	PA	2, 4
(Germany) Proton Huber Competition (Germany) Team Proton Huber Competition	65	(Germany) Kai Pfister	PA	5, 7
(Germany) Proton Huber Competition (Germany) Team Proton Huber Competition	76	(Sweden) Wilmur Wallenstam	R	1, 3
(Germany) Proton Huber Competition (Germany) Team Proton Huber Competition	88	(Sweden) Daniel Ros	P	1, 3
(Germany) Proton Huber Competition (Germany) Team Proton Huber Competition	95	(United Kingdom) Joseph Warhurst	R	All
(Germany) Black Falcon Team Zimmermann	7	(Germany) Alex Hardt	PA	5
(Germany) Laptime Performance	8	(Netherlands) Dirk Schouten	R	2
(Germany) Laptime Performance	8	(Netherlands) Dirk Schouten	P	8
(France) Schumacher CLRT	11	(France) Alessandro Ghiretti	P	All
(France) Schumacher CLRT	12	(Netherlands) Flynt Schuring	P	All
(Italy) Target (Note: Cars No. 13, 27 and 40 entered as Target and cars No. 32 and 98 entered as Target Competition) (Italy) Target Competition	13	(Germany) Alexander Tauscher	P	All
(Italy) Target (Italy) Target Competition	27	(Brazil) Matheus Ferreira	R	All
(Italy) Target (Italy) Target Competition	32	(Germany) Sebastian Freymuth	P	All
(Italy) Target (Italy) Target Competition	40	(Germany) Janne Stiak	P	All
(Italy) Target (Italy) Target Competition	98	(Germany) Jan Seyffert	P	All
(Germany) TEAM 75 Bernhard	14	(Netherlands) Senna van Soelen	P	All
(Germany) TEAM 75 Bernhard	15	(Germany) Daniel Gregor	R	1–4
(Germany) TEAM 75 Bernhard	16	(Poland) Karol Kręt	P	8
(Germany) TEAM 75 Bernhard	54	(Germany) Michael Essmann	PA	All
(Germany) ID Racing	17	(Germany) Christof Langer	PA	4
(Germany) ID Racing	17	(Germany) Christof Langer	PA	6
(Germany) ID Racing	42	(Austria) Kiano Blum	P	All
(Germany) ID Racing	44	(Netherlands) Emely de Heus	R	1–5
(Germany) ID Racing	45	(Australia) Marcos Flack	R	8
(Germany) ID Racing	48	(Norway) Oskar Biksrud	R	7
(Germany) Bonk Motorsport	33	(Germany) Michael Schrey	PA	All
(Germany) Bonk Motorsport	34	(Germany) Theo Oeverhaus	P	All
(Austria) Team Wimmer Werk Motorsport	36	(Austria) Raphael Rennhofer	R	1
(Austria) Team Wimmer Werk Motorsport	99	(Germany) Lorenz Stegmann	R	8
(Germany) [a-workx] by Porsche Paderborn	69	(United Arab Emirates) Ahmed Arif Alkhoori	P	1–2, 4
(Germany) [a-workx] by Porsche Paderborn	84	(Kuwait) Ahmad Al Shehab	PA	All
(Germany) [a-workx] by Porsche Paderborn	91	(Germany) Gian Luca Tüccaroglu	P	All
(Spain) Hadeca Racing	96	(Spain) Mikel Azcona	P	1–3

Icon	Class
P	Pro Cup
PA	Pro-Am Cup
R	Rookie
	Guest Starter

== Race results ==
Round		Circuit	Pole position	Fastest lap	Overall winner	Winning team	Rookie winner	Pro-Am winner
1	R1	(Italy) Imola Circuit	(Netherlands) Robert de Haan	(Netherlands) Robert de Haan	(Netherlands) Robert de Haan	(Germany) Proton Huber Competition	(Netherlands) Sacha Norden	(Germany) Michael Essmann
1	R2	(Italy) Imola Circuit	(Netherlands) Robert de Haan	(Netherlands) Robert de Haan	(Netherlands) Robert de Haan	(Germany) Proton Huber Competition	(Brazil) Matheus Ferreira	(Germany) Michael Schrey
2	R1	(Belgium) Circuit de Spa-Francorchamps	(France) Alessandro Ghiretti	(France) Alessandro Ghiretti	(France) Alessandro Ghiretti	(France) Schumacher CLRT	(Netherlands) Dirk Schouten	(Kuwait) Ahmad Al Shehab
2	R2	(Belgium) Circuit de Spa-Francorchamps	(Netherlands) Flynt Schuring	(France) Alessandro Ghiretti	(Netherlands) Flynt Schuring	(France) Schumacher CLRT	(Netherlands) Sacha Norden	(Germany) Sören Spreng
3	R1	(Netherlands) Circuit Zandvoort	(France) Alessandro Ghiretti	(France) Marvin Klein	(Germany) Janne Stiak	(Italy) Target	(Netherlands) Sacha Norden	(Kuwait) Ahmad Al Shehab
3	R2	(Netherlands) Circuit Zandvoort	(France) Alessandro Ghiretti	(Germany) Colin Bönighausen	(France) Alessandro Ghiretti	(France) Schumacher CLRT	(United Kingdom) Joseph Warhurst	(Germany) Michael Schrey
4	R1	(Germany) Norisring	(Netherlands) Flynt Schuring	(Netherlands) Flynt Schuring	(Netherlands) Flynt Schuring	(France) Schumacher CLRT	(Netherlands) Sacha Norden	(Germany) Michael Schrey
4	R2	(Germany) Norisring	(Netherlands) Huub van Eijndhoven	(Netherlands) Huub van Eijndhoven	(Netherlands) Robert de Haan	(Germany) Proton Huber Competition	(Netherlands) Sacha Norden	(Germany) Michael Schrey
5	R1	(Germany) Nürburgring	(France) Alessandro Ghiretti	(Germany) Alexander Tauscher	(Germany) Alexander Tauscher	(Italy) Target	(Brazil) Matheus Ferreira	(Germany) Alex Hardt
5	R2	(Germany) Nürburgring	(France) Alessandro Ghiretti	(France) Alessandro Ghiretti	(France) Alessandro Ghiretti	(France) Schumacher CLRT	(United Kingdom) Joseph Warhurst	(Germany) Michael Schrey
6	R1	(Germany) Sachsenring	(Netherlands) Flynt Schuring	(France) Alessandro Ghiretti	(Netherlands) Flynt Schuring	(France) Schumacher CLRT	(United Kingdom) Joseph Warhurst	(Germany) Sören Spreng
6	R2	(Germany) Sachsenring	(Netherlands) Robert de Haan	(Netherlands) Robert de Haan	(France) Alessandro Ghiretti	(France) Schumacher CLRT	(United Kingdom) Joseph Warhurst	(Germany) Michael Schrey
7	R1	(Austria) Red Bull Ring	(Netherlands) Robert de Haan	(Netherlands) Robert de Haan	(Netherlands) Robert de Haan	(Germany) Proton Huber Competition	(Netherlands) Sacha Norden	(Germany) Sören Spreng
7	R2	(Austria) Red Bull Ring	(Netherlands) Huub van Eijndhoven	(Netherlands) Wouter Boerekamps	(Netherlands) Wouter Boerekamps	(Netherlands) Team GP Elite	(Brazil) Matheus Ferreira	(Germany) Michael Essmann
8	R1	(Germany) Hockenheimring	(Germany) Alexander Tauscher	(Netherlands) Robert de Haan	(Netherlands) Robert de Haan	(Germany) Proton Huber Competition	(Netherlands) Sacha Norden	(Germany) Michael Schrey
8	R2	(Germany) Hockenheimring	(Germany) Alexander Tauscher (Note: Alexander Tauscher set the fastest time in qualifying but received a 5 place grid penalty for accumulating 6 penalty points over the year. Flynt Schuring, who set the second fastest time, was promoted to pole position.)	(South Africa) Keagan Masters	(Netherlands) Robert de Haan	(Germany) Proton Huber Competition	(Netherlands) Sacha Norden	(Kuwait) Ahmad Al Shehab

== Championship standings ==
=== Scoring system ===
Position	**1st**	**2nd**	**3rd**	**4th**	**5th**	**6th**	**7th**	**8th**	**9th**	**10th**	**11th**	**12th**	**13th**	**14th**	**15th**
Points	25	20	16	13	11	10	9	8	7	6	5	4	3	2	1

=== Overall ===
Pos.	Driver	Team	IMO (Italy)		SPA (Belgium)		ZAN (Netherlands)		NOR (Germany)		NÜR (Germany)		SAC (Germany)		RBR (Austria)		HOC (Germany)		Points
1	(Netherlands) Robert de Haan	(Germany) Proton Huber Competition	**1**	**1**	9	3	2	12	3	1	3	11	5	**23**	**1**	2	1	1	269
2	(France) Alessandro Ghiretti	(France) Schumacher CLRT	4	5	**1**	2	**5**	**1**	2	4	**19**	**1**	2	1	2	13	5	2	262
3	(Netherlands) Huub van Eijndhoven	(Netherlands) Team GP Elite	8	4	4	4	7	Ret	4	**2**	6	8	3	3	5	**3**	4	9	186
4	(Netherlands) Flynt Schuring	(France) Schumacher CLRT	11	2	17	**1**	4	22	**1**	Ret	Ret	12	**1**	2	6	6	7	26	167
5	(Israel) Ariel Levi	(Netherlands) Team GP Elite	9	8	3	5	3	4	7	9	4	2	11	8	Ret	5	9	3	167
6	(Germany) Janne Stiak	(Italy) Target	10	13	14	7	1	3	11	12	7	7	6	5	3	4	8	8	157
7	(Germany) Alexander Tauscher	(Italy) Target	3	7	15	9	9	Ret	9	Ret	1	4	10	10	4	7	**2**	**4**	154
8	(Germany) Theo Oeverhaus	(Germany) Bonk Motorsport	2	11	2	8	8	24†	5	6	2	3	8	7	15	10	28	6	153
9	(Netherlands) Kas Haverkort	(Netherlands) Team GP Elite	7	6	5	6	6	5	6	3	14	6	4	4					126
10	(France) Marvin Klein	(Germany) Proton Huber Competition	5	3	16	10	11	2	12	5	5	5	Ret	6	9	Ret			114
11	(Netherlands) Senna van Soelen	(Germany) TEAM 75 Bernhard	6	10	7	12	10	6	8	10	Ret	Ret	7	9	8	12	6	7	108
12	(Netherlands) Sacha Norden	(Germany) Proton Huber Competition	14	14	10	11	14	Ret	13	8	22	13	22	13	10	9	12	10	61
13	(Austria) Kiano Blum	(Germany) ID Racing	Ret	15	12	24	16	Ret	18	13	9	10	9	17	14	11	11	14	46
14	(United Kingdom) Joseph Warhurst	(Germany) Team Proton Huber Competition	19	26	18	23	15	8	14	14	10	9	13	11	25†	14	19	20	37
15	(Brazil) Matheus Ferreira	(Italy) Target	16	12	19	13	20	23	15	11	8	Ret	18	16	20	8	17	12	36
16	(Netherlands) Wouter Boerekamps	(Netherlands) Team GP Elite													7	1			34
17	(Germany) Colin Bönighausen	(Germany) Team Proton Huber Competition	13	19	13	15	12	20	10	7									29
18	(South Africa) Keagan Masters	(Germany) Proton Huber Competition															3	5	27
19	(Germany) Sebastian Freymuth	(Italy) Target Competition	17	18	11	14	29†	14	17	16	13	19	12	12	23	Ret	14	18	27
20	(Germany) Jan Seyffert	(Italy) Target Competition	15	16	Ret	16	24	10	16	19	23	18	17	15	24†	DNS	10	15	20
21	(Germany) Gian Luca Tüccaroglu	(Germany) [a-workx] by Porsche Paderborn	27†	23	22	17	13	Ret	22	17	11	14	Ret	14	13	23†	16	Ret	16
22	(Germany) Jonas Greif	(Netherlands) GP Elite	22	21	21	19	23	11	21	15	15	16	19	24	11	18	23	25	15
23	(Netherlands) Nick Ho	(Netherlands) Team GP Elite															13	13	7
24	(Germany) Sören Spreng	(Netherlands) GP Elite	Ret	30	29	20	Ret	Ret	24	20	Ret	17	14	22	12	19	Ret	24	6
25	(Germany) Michael Schrey	(Germany) Bonk Motorsport	24	20	Ret	27	21	15	20	18	16	15	15	18	17	17	21	27	6
26	(Germany) Daniel Gregor	(Germany) TEAM 75 Bernhard	18	Ret	20	22	17	13	19	Ret									5
27	(Netherlands) Emely de Heus	(Germany) ID Racing	DSQ	31	28	26	25	16	Ret	23	21	Ret							2
28	(Belgium) Ghislain Cordeel	(Netherlands) GP Elite															24	16	1
29	(Norway) Oskar Biksrud	(Germany) ID Racing													22	15			1
30	(Germany) Michael Essmann	(Germany) TEAM 75 Bernhard	21	24	24	25	22	17	23	DNS	20	20	Ret	19	18	16	25	22	1
31	(Kuwait) Ahmad Al Shehab	(Germany) [a-workx] by Porsche Paderborn	23	28	23	21	19	18	25	21	17	23	20	20	16	20	27	19	0
32	(Australia) Samer Shahin	(Netherlands) GP Elite	26	27	26	29	27	19					16	21					0
33	(Germany) Kai Pfister (Note: Pfister was ineligible to score points in rounds 2 and 4.)	(Germany) Team Proton Huber Competition			25	28			Ret	22	18	22			21	21			0
34	(Bulgaria) Alexandra Vateva	(Germany) Team Proton Huber Competition													19	22	22	23	0
35	(Germany) Christof Langer (Note: Langer was ineligible to score points in round 4.)	(Germany) ID Racing							26	24			21	25					0
36	(Poland) Karol Kręt	(Germany) TEAM 75 Bernhard															26	21	0
37	(United Arab Emirates) Ahmed Arif Alkhoori	(Germany) [a-workx] by Porsche Paderborn	25	29	27	Ret			27	25									0
Guest drivers ineligible to score points
–	(Spain) Mikel Azcona	(Spain) Hadeca Racing	12	9	6	18	28	9											–
–	(Sweden) Daniel Ros	(Germany) Proton Huber Competition	Ret	17			18	7											–
–	(Netherlands) Dirk Schouten	(Germany) Laptime Performance			8	Ret											15	11	–
–	(Germany) Alex Hardt	(Germany) Black Falcon Team Zimmermann									12	21							–
–	(Australia) Marcos Flack	(Germany) ID Racing															18	17	–
–	(Austria) Raphael Rennhofer	(Austria) Team Wimmer Werk Motorsport	20	22															–
–	(Germany) Lorenz Stegmann	(Germany) Team Wimmer Werk Motorsport															20	28	–
–	(Sweden) Wilmur Wallenstam	(Germany) Proton Huber Competition	Ret	25			26	21											–
Pos.	Driver	Team	IMO (Italy)		SPA (Belgium)		ZAN (Netherlands)		NOR (Germany)		NÜR (Germany)		SAC (Germany)		RBR (Austria)		HOC (Germany)		Points

Colour	Result
Gold	Winner
Silver	Second place
Bronze	Third place
Green	Points classification
Blue	Non-points classification
Blue	Non-classified finish (NC)
Purple	Retired, not classified (Ret)
Red	Did not qualify (DNQ)
Red	Did not pre-qualify (DNPQ)
Black	Disqualified (DSQ)
White	Did not start (DNS)
White	Withdrew (WD)
White	Race cancelled (C)
Blank	Did not practice (DNP)
Blank	Did not arrive (DNA)
Blank	Excluded (EX)

**Bold** – Pole

Italics – Fastest Lap

† — Did not finish, but classified

=== Pro-Am ===
Pos.	Driver	Team	IMO (Italy)		SPA (Belgium)		ZAN (Netherlands)		NOR (Germany)		NÜR (Germany)		SAC (Germany)		RBR (Austria)		HOC (Germany)		Points
1	(Germany) Michael Schrey	(Germany) Bonk Motorsport	3	**1**	**Ret**	**4**	2	1	1	1	2	1	2	**1**	3	2	**1**	2	325
2	(Kuwait) Ahmad Al Shehab	(Germany) [a-workx] by Porsche Paderborn	2	4	1	2	**1**	**3**	**4**	**3**	3	6	4	3	2	4	3	**1**	282
3	(Germany) Michael Essmann	(Germany) TEAM 75 Bernhard	**1**	2	2	3	3	2	2	DNS	5	3	Ret	2	4	1	2	3	260
4	(Germany) Sören Spreng	(Netherlands) GP Elite	Ret	5	5	1	Ret	Ret	3	2	Ret	2	**1**	5	**1**	3	Ret	4	195
5	(Australia) Samer Shahin	(Netherlands) GP Elite	4	3	4	6	4	4					3	4					111
6	(Germany) Kai Pfister	(Germany) Proton Huber Competition			3	5			Ret	4	4	5			5	**5**			51
7	(Germany) Christof Langer	(Germany) ID Racing							5	5			5	6					21
Guest drivers ineligible to score points
–	(Germany) Alex Hardt	(Germany) Black Falcon Team Zimmermann									**1**	**4**							–
Pos.	Driver	Team	IMO (Italy)		SPA (Belgium)		ZAN (Netherlands)		NOR (Germany)		NÜR (Germany)		SAC (Germany)		RBR (Austria)		HOC (Germany)		Points

=== Rookie ===
Pos.	Driver	Team	IMO (Italy)		SPA (Belgium)		ZAN (Netherlands)		NOR (Germany)		NÜR (Germany)		SAC (Germany)		RBR (Austria)		HOC (Germany)		Points
1	(Netherlands) Sacha Norden	(Germany) Proton Huber Competition	**1**	2	**2**	1	1	**Ret**	**1**	**1**	**4**	**2**	**3**	2	1	2	1	**1**	334
2	(United Kingdom) Joseph Warhurst	(Germany) Team Proton Huber Competition	4	5	3	4	**2**	1	2	3	2	1	1	**1**	**4**	3	5	5	293
3	(Brazil) Matheus Ferreira	(Italy) Target	2	**1**	4	2	4	5	3	2	1	Ret	2	3	2	**1**	3	2	285
4	(Germany) Daniel Gregor	(Germany) TEAM 75 Bernhard	3	Ret	5	3	3	2	4	Ret									94
5	(Netherlands) Emely de Heus	(Germany) ID Racing	DSQ	6	6	5	5	3	Ret	4	3	Ret							91
6	(Netherlands) Nick Ho	(Netherlands) Team GP Elite															**2**	3	36
7	(Norway) Oskar Biksrud	(Germany) ID Racing													3	4			29
Guest drivers ineligible to score points
–	(Netherlands) Dirk Schouten (Note: Schouten was entered in the Rookie class only in round 2.)	(Germany) Laptime Performance			1	**Ret**													–
–	(Austria) Raphael Rennhofer	(Austria) Team Wimmer Werk Motorsport	5	3															–
–	(Sweden) Wilmur Wallenstam	(Germany) Proton Huber Competition	Ret	4			6	4											–
–	(Australia) Marcos Flack	(Germany) ID Racing															4	4	–
–	(Germany) Lorenz Stegmann	(Germany) Team Wimmer Werk Motorsport															6	7	–
–	(Bulgaria) Alexandra Vateva	(Germany) Team Proton Huber Competition															7	6	–
Pos.	Driver	Team	IMO (Italy)		SPA (Belgium)		ZAN (Netherlands)		NOR (Germany)		NÜR (Germany)		SAC (Germany)		RBR (Austria)		HOC (Germany)		Points

=== Teams ===
Pos.	Team	Points
1	(France) Schumacher CLRT	436
2	(Germany) Proton Huber Competition	435
3	(Netherlands) Team GP Elite	417
4	(Italy) Target	332
5	(Germany) Bonk Motorsport	173
6	(Germany) TEAM 75 Bernhard	130
7	(Germany) Team Proton Huber Competition	94
8	(Italy) Target Competition	84
9	(Germany) ID Racing	69
10	(Netherlands) GP Elite	37
11	(Germany) [a-workx] by Porsche Paderborn	33
Pos.	Team	Points
