= Saqer Al-Maosherji =

Kuwaiti racing driver (born 2008)

Saqer Al-Maosherji صقر المعوشرجي
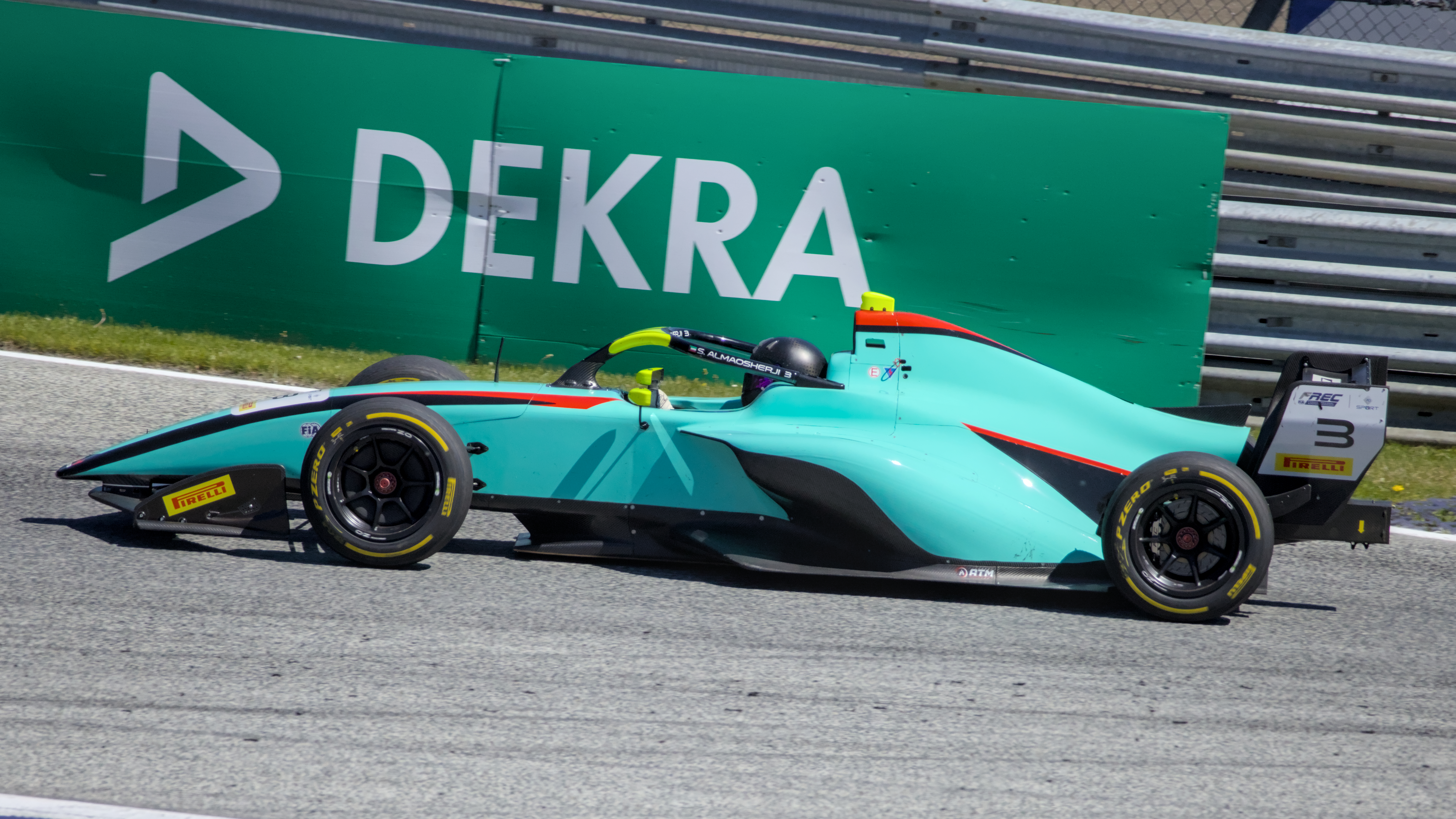
- Al-Maosherji in 2026
- Nationality: (Kuwait) Kuwaiti
- Born: 26 January 2008 (age 18) Kuwait City, Kuwait

Formula Regional European Championship career
- Debut season: 2025
- Current team: G4 Racing
- Former teams: AKCEL GP
- Starts: 35
- Wins: 0
- Podiums: 0
- Poles: 0
- Fastest laps: 0
- Best finish: 22nd in 2026

Previous series
- 2024: F4 Saudi Arabian

Saqer Al-Maosherji (born 26 January 2008), sometimes spelled Sager Almaosherji, is a Kuwaiti racing driver who last competed in the Formula Regional European Championship for G4 Racing.

== Career ==
=== Karting ===
Al-Maosherji made his karting debut in 2022 won the 2023 Kuwait Karting Championship in the Junior category.

=== Formula 4 ===
Al-Maosherji made his single-seater and Formula 4 debut in the non-championship round of the 2024 F4 Saudi Arabian Championship at the Bahrain International Circuit, which took place in December 2023. He got his maiden podium in race one with second place. In the first championship round at Kuwait Motor Town, he came second in races one and three. He achieved his maiden car racing win in the second and last non-championship round also held at Kuwait Motor Town. The final three rounds of the series were held back-to-back at the Jeddah Corniche Circuit, and Al-Maosherji came second in race three of the first event, before achieving his first pole positions at the second Jeddah round. He only translated one pole position into a podium, in race three. Al-Maosherji finished sixth in the championship with two pole positions, one fastest lap, four podiums and 106 points.

=== Formula Regional European Championship ===
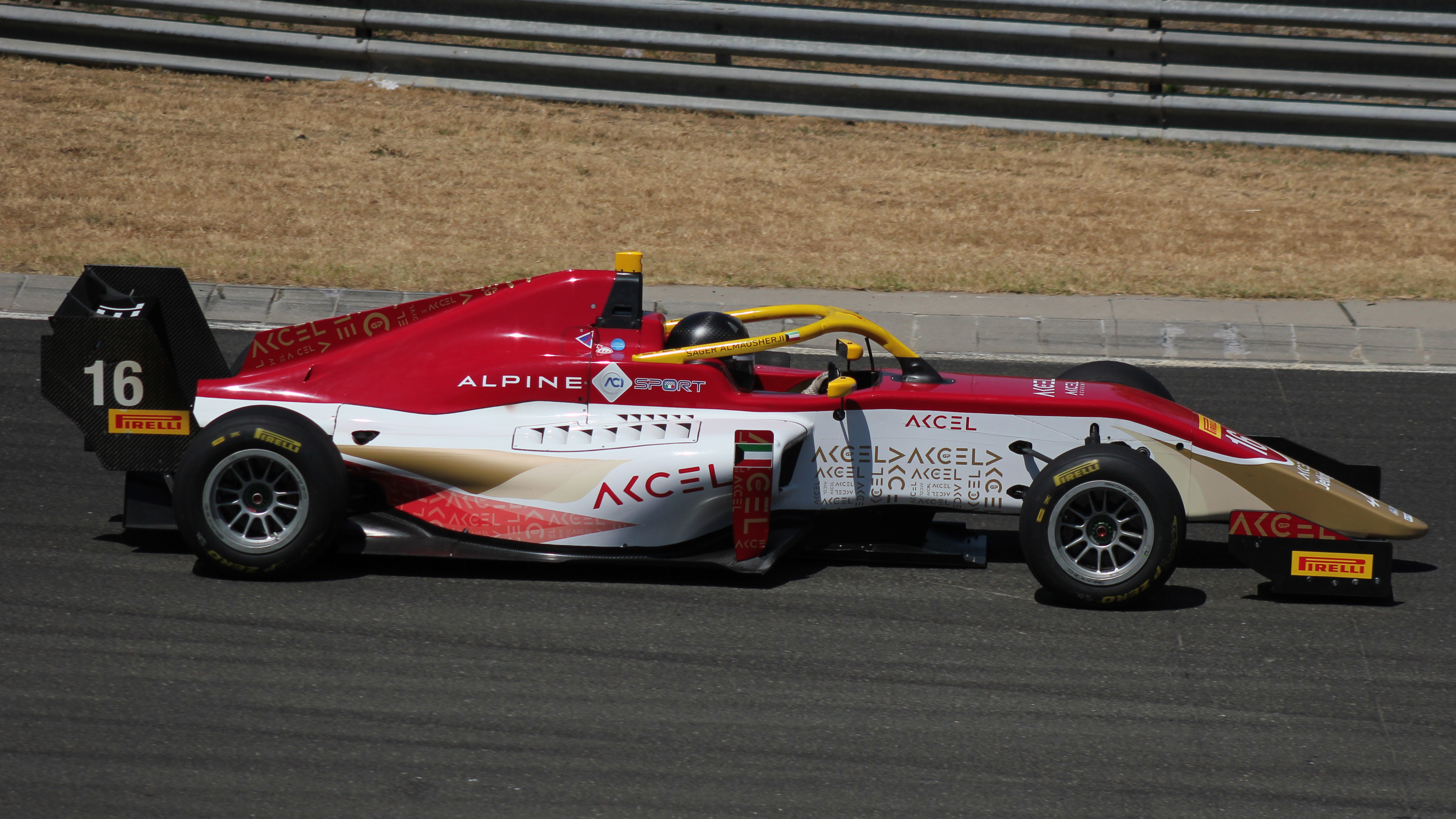
Al-Maosherji racing for AKCEL GP at the Hungaroring in FRECA in 2025.

==== 2025 ====
After being inactive from racing for a year, Al-Maosherji was announced to be competing in the 2025 Formula Regional European Championship for AKCEL GP, partnering Aditya Kulkarni and making his debut in Formula Regional machinery. He achieved a best finish of nineteenth with them, twice. From the Red Bull Ring and onwards, he switched to G4 Racing. With the Swiss outfit, he recorded his best result yet of fifteenth in the final race of the championship at Monza Circuit. He ended the championship in 28th.

==== 2026 ====
Al-Maosherji returned to FREC in 2026 with the same G4 Racing outfit that he contested the latter half of the previous season with. He achieved his first Formula Regional points in the fourth round at Monza Circuit, coming ninth and tenth in the second and third races. Al-Maosherji built on this momentum a round later at the Hungaroring, where he came sixth and eighth, his highest results of the season. He ended his sophomore campaign twenty-second in the standings with fifteen points.

== Karting record ==
=== Karting career summary ===
Season	Series	Team	Position
2023	Kuwait Karting Championship - Junior		1st

== Racing record ==
=== Racing career summary ===
Season	Series	Team	Races	Wins	Poles	F. Laps	Podiums	Points	Position
2023	F4 Saudi Arabian Championship - Trophy Event	Altawkilat Meritus.GP	8	1	0	1	2	N/A	NC
2024	F4 Saudi Arabian Championship	Altawkilat Meritus.GP	17	0	2	1	4	106	6th
2025	Formula Regional European Championship	AKCEL GP	9	0	0	0	0	0	28th
2025	Formula Regional European Championship	G4 Racing	8	0	0	0	0	0	28th
2026	Formula Regional European Championship	G4 Racing	18	0	0	0	0	15	22nd

* Season still in progress.

=== Complete F4 Saudi Arabian Championship results ===
(key) (Races in bold indicate pole position; races in italics indicate fastest lap)

Year	Team	1	2	3	4	5	6	7	8	9	10	11	12	13	14	15	16	17	DC	Points
2024	Altawkilat Meritus.GP	KMT1; 1; 2	KMT1; 2; 5	KMT1; 3; 2	KMT1; 4; 5	LSL; 1; 11	LSL; 2 Ret	LSL; 3; 6	LSL; 4; 6	JED1; 1; 6	JED1; 2; 9†	JED1; 3; 2	**JED2**; **1** Ret	JED2; 2; 4	**JED2**; **3**; 3	JED3; 1 Ret	JED3; 2; 8	JED3; 3; 9	6th	106

=== Complete Formula Regional European Championship results ===
(key) (Races in bold indicate pole position) (Races in italics indicate fastest lap)

Year	Team	1	2	3	4	5	6	7	8	9	10	11	12	13	14	15	16	17	18	19	20	DC	Points
2025	AKCEL GP	MIS; 1; 22	MIS; 2; 19	SPA; 1 DNS	SPA; 2; 23	ZAN; 1; 21	ZAN; 2; 19	HUN; 1 Ret	HUN; 2; 20	LEC; 1	LEC; 2	IMO; 1; 24	IMO; 2; 24									28th	0
2025	G4 Racing													RBR; 1; 24	RBR; 2; 26	CAT; 1; 24	CAT; 2; 21	HOC; 1; 28†	HOC; 2; 26	MNZ; 1; 19	MNZ; 2; 15	28th	0
2026	G4 Racing	RBR; 1 Ret	RBR; 2 Ret	RBR; 3 Ret	ZAN; 1; 16	ZAN; 2; 26	SPA; 1; 25	SPA; 2 C	SPA; 3 Ret	MNZ; 1; 22	MNZ; 2; 9	MNZ; 3; 10	HUN; 1; 6	HUN; 2; 8	LEC; 1 DNS	LEC; 2; 13	IMO; 1; 18	IMO; 2 Ret	IMO; 3; 22	HOC; 1 Ret	HOC; 2 Ret	22nd	15
