= Andrej Petrović (racing driver) =

Serbian racing driver (born 2006)

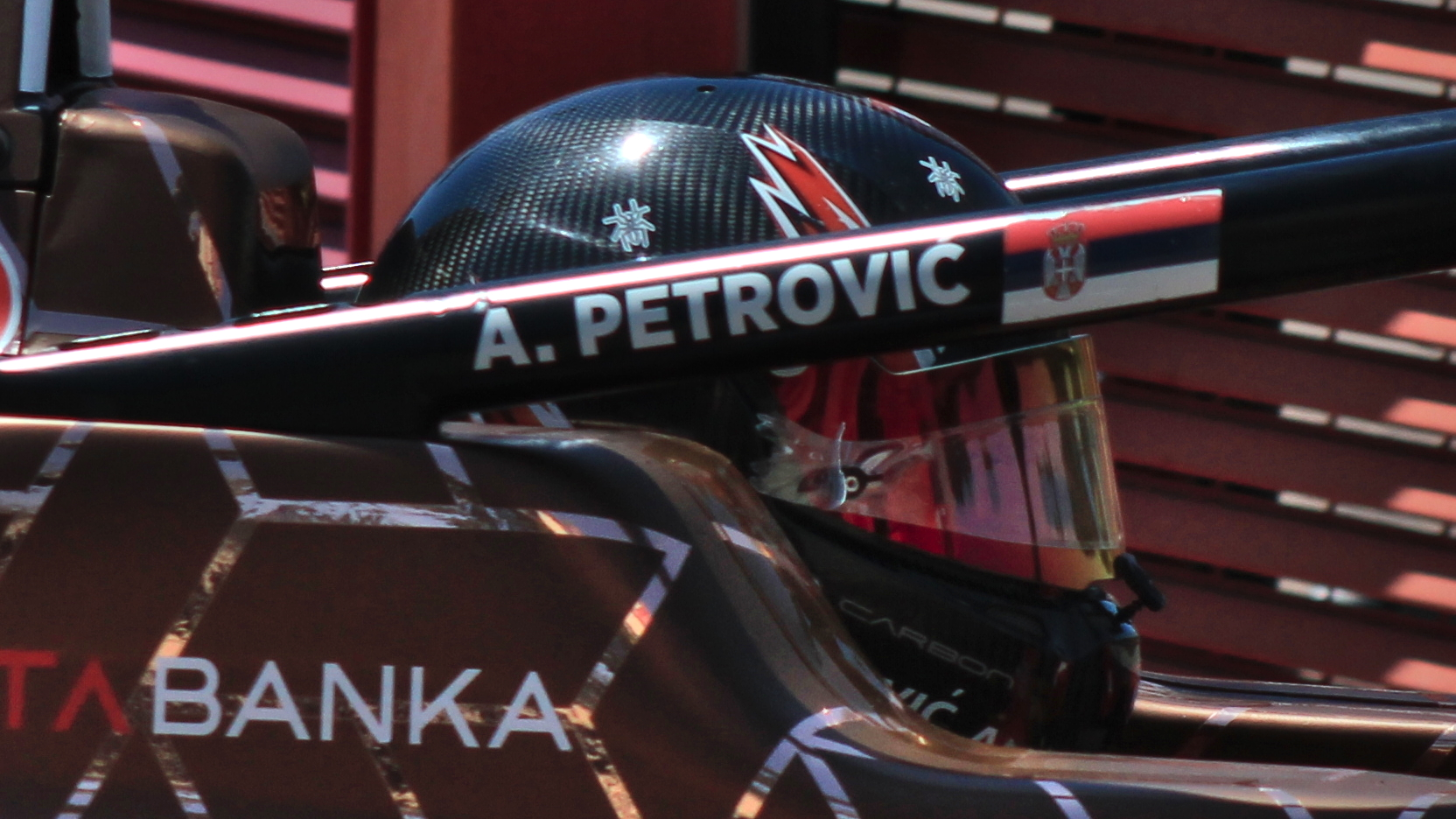
- Petrović in 2024
- Born: 8 April 2006 (age 20); Belgrade, Serbia
- Nationality: (Serbia) Serbian

Eurocup-3 career
- Debut season: 2026
- Car number: 22
- Former teams: Tecnicar by Amtog
- Starts: 5
- Wins: 0
- Podiums: 0
- Poles: 0
- Fastest laps: 0
- Best finish: 25th in 2026

F4 Spanish Championship career
- Debut season: 2024
- Current team: T-Code
- Car number: 77
- Starts: 29
- Wins: 1
- Podiums: 4
- Poles: 2
- Fastest laps: 1
- Best finish: 5th in 2026

Previous series
- 2025–2026; 2024; 2024; 2024: Eurocup-4 Spanish Winter; F4 CEZ; Italian F4; F4 Saudi Arabian
- Statistics up to date as of 14 November 2026.

Andrej Petrović (born 8 April 2006) is a Serbian racing driver who last competed in the F4 Spanish Championship for T-Code. He is the runner-up of the 2024 F4 Saudi Arabian Championship.

== Career ==
=== Karting ===
Petrović began karting in 2015 and won the Serbian Championship in the following two seasons, as well as 2022 and 2023. Petrović won the 2021 and 2023 FIA Central European Zone Championship, as well as the 2023 Austrian Championship. His most prestigious title was the 2023 Rotax Max Challenge Grand Finals in the Senior Max category.

=== Formula 4 ===
==== 2024 ====
Petrović made his single-seater debut in the 2024 F4 Saudi Arabian Championship, where he got his maiden car racing podium in the opening round at Kuwait Motor Town. He also collected two more podiums in the same round. Petrović got his first win in motorsports in the non-championship round, also held at Kuwait Motor Town.

The final three rounds of the series were all held back-to-back at Jeddah Corniche Circuit, where he achieved double pole positions in the first round, which he converted to wins. At the third Jeddah round, he collected another pole position and a final win. Petrović came runner-up to the championship, with three wins, three pole positions, seven fastest laps, eleven podiums and 193 points.

Petrović joined the grid of the 2024 Italian F4 Championship with PHM AIX Racing, scoring only one point in his campaign – at the opening round at Misano – before cutting it short and ending his racing season halfway through. He made a one-off cameo in the second round of the 2024 Formula 4 CEZ Championship at the Red Bull Ring, with PHM AIX Racing, where he won the first race and finished the championship in twelfth.

==== 2025 ====
Petrović returned to Formula 4 in 2025, where he competed in the inaugural season of the Eurocup-4 Spanish Winter Championship and the main Spanish F4 series for Tecnicar. In the three-round Winter Championship, Petrović took a breakthrough win at the Navarra finale and ended the championship in eleventh.

In the main series, Petrović began the season with a best result of fifth at MotorLand Aragón, before taking a pair of fourth-place finishes at Navarra and Algarve. Petrović then took three more points finishes and ended the championship in twelfth with 60 points.

==== 2026 ====
Petrović contested the Eurocup-4 Spanish Winter Championship for a second year in 2026 with T-Code. In the three-round Winter Championship, Petrović won the Algarve Sprint, before taking two podiums Jarama and ending the campaign with a win from pole at Aragón Overall, he ended third in the championship, two points shy of runner-up, which was occupied by Nathan Tye.

Petrović continued with T-Code in the main campaign of the F4 Spanish Championship. In the reverse grid race of the second round at Algarve International Circuit, he got his first podium in the series. He also claimed his maiden pole position in the third race, and achieved a podium but was given a penalty that was reinstated after the third round had commenced. A week later at MotorLand Aragón, he collected another podium in the first race and successfully converted a pole position to his first F4 Spain win in the third race.

=== Eurocup-3 ===
==== 2026 ====
Petrović made his Formula Regional-level debut in the first round of the 2026 Eurocup-3 season at Circuit Paul Ricard and came eleventh in the third race. He returned for the same team at the fourth round at Monza Circuit.

== Personal life ==
Petrović did alpine skiing in his youth and was also part of the Serbian national skiing team by the time he was 11. He was also the national champion in giant slalom.

== Karting record ==
=== Karting career summary ===
Season	Series	Team	Position
2015	Serbian Championship		3rd
2016	Serbian Championship		1st
2017	Serbian Championship – 60 Mini		1st
2017	Moravsky Pohar		3rd
2017	WSK Final Cup – 60 Mini	Lion Kart Factory Racing Team	73rd
2018	WSK Champions Cup – 60 Mini	Praga Junior Team	13th
2018	WSK Super Master Series – 60 Mini	Praga Junior Team	36th
2018	WSK Open Cup – 60 Mini	Praga Junior Team	16th
2018	Trofeo D'Autunno – Mini		5th
2018	WSK Final Cup – 60 Mini	PC Driver Project	22nd
2019	WSK Super Master Series – OK Junior	Schumacher Junior Team	109th
2019	WSK Euro Series – OK Junior	AKK Bogati Corse	73rd
2019	24° South Garda Winter Cup – OK Junior	RS Schumacher Racing Team	NC
2019	Rotax Max Challenge International Trophy – Junior Max	AKK SPORTSTIL	
2019	WSK Open Cup – OK Junior	Newman Motorsport Srl	84th
2019	WSK Final Cup – OK Junior	Newman Motorsport Srl	NC
2019	Austrian Karting-Meisterschaft – Div III – Rotax Max Junior	Lion Kart	8th
2019	FIA Central European Zone Championship – Rotax Junior	ASK Sporticco R.T.	2nd
2020	Rotax Max Euro Trophy – Junior Max	Lion Kart Racing	19th
2020	FIA Central European Zone Championship		2nd
2020	Rotax Max Challenge International Trophy – Junior Max	SSC SPORTSTIL	14th
2021	Rotax Max Challenge International Trophy – Rotax Senior	SSC Sportstil	18th
2021	Rotax Max Challenge Grand Finals – Senior Max	SSC Sportstil	33rd
2021	Rotax Max Euro Challenge – Senior Max	AKSK Crvena Zcezda	36th
2021	FIA Central European Zone Championship – Rotax Senior		1st
2022	Rotax Max Euro Challenge – Senior Max	KSCA Sodi Europe Team	16th
2022	Rotax Max Challenge Grand Finals – Senior Max	KSCA Sodi Europe Team	NC
2022	FIA Central European Zone Championship – Senior		2nd
2022	Serbian Championship – Senior		1st
2023	Rotax Max Winter Cup – Senior Max	Samku Serbian Racing Team	NC
2023	Rotax Max Euro Challenge – Senior Max	Samku Serbian Racing Team	101st
2023	Serbian Championship		1st
2023	Austrian Championship		1st
2023	FIA Central European Zone Championship		1st
2023	Rotax Max Challenge International Trophy – Senior Max	SSC Sportstil	15th
2023	Rotax Max Challenge Grand Finals – Senior Max	SSC Sportstil	1st

== Racing record ==
=== Racing career summary ===
Season	Series	Team	Races	Wins	Poles	F/Laps	Podiums	Points	Position
2023	F4 Saudi Arabian Championship – Trophy Event	Altawkilat Meritus.GP	4	1	0	1	3	N/A	NC
2024	F4 Saudi Arabian Championship	Altawkilat Meritus.GP	17	3	3	7	11	193	**2nd**
2024	Italian F4 Championship	PHM AIX Racing	12	0	0	0	0	1	26th
2024	Formula 4 CEZ Championship	PHM AIX Racing	3	1	0	2	1	43	12th
2024	F4 Spanish Championship	Tecnicar Motorsport	0	0	0	0	0	0	NC†
2025	Eurocup-4 Spanish Winter Championship	T-Code	3	1	0	0	1	29	11th
2025	Eurocup-4 Spanish Winter Championship	Tecnicar by Amtog	6	0	0	0	0	29	11th
2025	F4 Spanish Championship	Tecnicar by Amtog	21	0	0	0	0	60	12th
2026	Eurocup-4 Spanish Winter Championship	T-Code	9	2	1	0	4	79	**3rd**
2026	F4 Spanish Championship	T-Code	21	1	2	1	5	184	5th
2026	Eurocup-3	Tecnicar by Amtog	5	0	0	0	0	0	25th

† As Petrović was a guest driver, he was ineligible for points.
^{*} Season still in progress.

=== Complete F4 Saudi Arabian Championship results ===
(key) (Races in bold indicate pole position; races in italics indicate fastest lap)

Year	Team	1	2	3	4	5	6	7	8	9	10	11	12	13	14	15	16	17	DC	Points
2024	Altawkilat Meritus.GP	KMT1; 1; 5	KMT1; 2; 3	KMT1; 3; 3	KMT1; 4; 3	LSL; 1; 3	LSL; 2 Ret	LSL; 3; 3	LSL; 4; 8	**JED1**; **1**; 1	JED1; 2; 7	**JED1**; **3**; 1	JED2; 1; 4	JED2; 2; 2	JED2; 3; 9†	**JED3**; **1**; 2	JED3; 2; 3	JED3; 3; 1	2nd	193

=== Complete Italian F4 Championship results ===
(key) (Races in bold indicate pole position; races in italics indicate fastest lap)

Year	Team	1	2	3	4	5	6	7	8	9	10	11	12	13	14	15	16	17	18	19	20	21	DC	Points
2024	PHM Racing	MIS; 1; 17	MIS; 2; 10	MIS; 3; 12	IMO; 1; 14	IMO; 2; 12	IMO; 3; 12	VLL; 1 Ret	VLL; 2 Ret	VLL; 3; 19	MUG; 1; 20	MUG; 2; 29	MUG; 3; 14	LEC; 1	LEC; 2	LEC; 3	CAT; 1	CAT; 2	CAT; 3	MNZ; 1	MNZ; 2	MNZ; 3	26th	1

=== Complete Formula 4 CEZ Championship results ===
(key) (Races in bold indicate pole position; races in italics indicate fastest lap)

Year	Team	1	2	3	4	5	6	7	8	9	10	11	12	13	14	15	16	17	18	DC	Points
2024	PHM Racing	BAL; 1	BAL; 2	BAL; 3	RBR; 1; 1	RBR; 2; 6	RBR; 3; 6	SVK; 1	SVK; 2	SVK; 3	MOS; 1	MOS; 2	MOS; 3	BRN; 1	BRN; 2	BRN; 3	SAL; 1	SAL; 2	SAL; 3	12th	43

=== Complete F4 Spanish Championship results ===
(key) (Races in bold indicate pole position; races in italics indicate fastest lap)

Year	Team	1	2	3	4	5	6	7	8	9	10	11	12	13	14	15	16	17	18	19	20	21	DC	Points
2024	Tecnicar Motorsport	JAR; 1	JAR; 2	JAR; 3	POR; 1	POR; 2	POR; 3	LEC; 1	LEC; 2	LEC; 3	ARA; 1	ARA; 2	ARA; 3	CRT; 1	CRT; 2	CRT; 3	JER; 1	JER; 2	JER; 3	CAT; 1 WD	CAT; 2 WD	CAT; 3 WD	NC†	0
2025	T-Code by Amtog	ARA; 1; 8	ARA; 2; 11	ARA; 3; 5	NAV; 1; 16	NAV; 2; 11	NAV; 3; 4	POR; 1; 4	POR; 2; 7	POR; 3; 11	LEC; 1; 9	LEC; 2; 13	LEC; 3; 31	JER; 1; 12	JER; 2; 11	JER; 3 Ret	CRT; 1; 22	CRT; 2; 21	CRT; 3; 5	CAT; 1; 31	CAT; 2; 7	CAT; 3; 19	12th	60
2026	T-Code	CRT; 1; 7	CRT; 2 Ret	CRT; 3; 19	POR; 1; 30†	POR; 2; 2	**POR**; **3**; 2	ARA; 1; 3	ARA; 2; 5	**ARA**; **3**; 1	JAR; 1; 4	JAR; 2; 6	JAR; 3; 6	JER; 1; 6	JER; 2; 6	JER; 3; 7	NAV; 1; 9	NAV; 2; 25	NAV; 3; 4	CAT; 1; 6	CAT; 2; 3	CAT; 3; 4	5th	184

† As Petrović was a guest driver, he was ineligible for points.

=== Complete Eurocup-4 Spanish Winter Championship results ===
(key) (Races in bold indicate pole position) (Races in italics indicate fastest lap)

Year	Team	1	2	3	4	5	6	7	8	9	DC	Points
2025	Tecnicar by Amtog	JER; 1; 14	JER; 2; 11	JER; 3; 10	POR; 1; 10	POR; 2 Ret	POR; 3; 9				11th	29
2025	T-Code							NAV; 1; 28	NAV; 2; 14	NAV; 3; 1	11th	29
2026	T-Code	POR; 1; 6	POR; 2; 1	POR; 3; 5	JAR; 1; 17	JAR; 2; 2	JAR; 3; 3	ARA; 1; 13	ARA; 2; 18	**ARA**; **3**; 1	3rd	79

=== Complete Eurocup-3 results ===
(key) (Races in bold indicate pole position; races in italics indicate fastest lap)

Year	Team	1	2	3	4	5	6	7	8	9	10	11	12	13	14	15	16	17	18	19	DC	Points
2026	Tecnicar by Amtog	LEC; 1; 16	LEC; SR; 18	LEC; 2; 11	POR; 1	POR; 2	IMO; 1	IMO; SR	IMO; 2	MNZ; 1; 21	MNZ; 2 Ret	SIL; 1	SIL; 2	JER; 1	JER; SR	JER; 2	HUN; 1	HUN; 2	CAT; 1	CAT; 2	25th	0
