= 2024 GT Cup Open Europe =

Sports car racing competition

The 2024 GT Cup Open Europe was the sixth season of the GT Cup Open Europe, the grand tourer-style sports car racing series founded by the Spanish GT Sport Organización. It began on 27 April at the Algarve International Circuit and ended at the Autodromo Nazionale di Monza on 20 October after six rounds.

== Calendar ==
Round		Circuit	Date	Support bill	Map of circuit locations
1	R1	(Portugal) Algarve International Circuit, Portimão	27–28 April	Euroformula Open Championship; International GT Open; Alpine Elf Europa Cup; Renault Clio Cup Series	2024 GT Cup Open Europe is located in Europe
1	R2	(Portugal) Algarve International Circuit, Portimão	27–28 April	Euroformula Open Championship; International GT Open; Alpine Elf Europa Cup; Renault Clio Cup Series	2024 GT Cup Open Europe is located in Europe
2	R1	(Germany) Hockenheimring, Hockenheim	11–12 May	Formula Regional European Championship; Euroformula Open Championship; International GT Open; Renault Clio Cup Series	2024 GT Cup Open Europe is located in Europe
2	R2	(Germany) Hockenheimring, Hockenheim	11–12 May	Formula Regional European Championship; Euroformula Open Championship; International GT Open; Renault Clio Cup Series	2024 GT Cup Open Europe is located in Europe
3	R1	(Belgium) Circuit de Spa-Francorchamps, Stavelot	25–26 May	Formula Regional European Championship; Euroformula Open Championship; International GT Open	2024 GT Cup Open Europe is located in Europe
3	R2	(Belgium) Circuit de Spa-Francorchamps, Stavelot	25–26 May	Formula Regional European Championship; Euroformula Open Championship; International GT Open	2024 GT Cup Open Europe is located in Europe
4	R1	(France) Circuit Paul Ricard, Le Castellet	20–21 July	Formula Regional European Championship; Euroformula Open Championship; Italian F4 Championship; International GT Open	2024 GT Cup Open Europe is located in Europe
4	R2	(France) Circuit Paul Ricard, Le Castellet	20–21 July	Formula Regional European Championship; Euroformula Open Championship; Italian F4 Championship; International GT Open	2024 GT Cup Open Europe is located in Europe
5	R1	(Spain) Circuit de Barcelona-Catalunya, Montmeló	28–29 September	Euroformula Open Championship; Italian F4 Championship; International GT Open	2024 GT Cup Open Europe is located in Europe
5	R2	(Spain) Circuit de Barcelona-Catalunya, Montmeló	28–29 September	Euroformula Open Championship; Italian F4 Championship; International GT Open	2024 GT Cup Open Europe is located in Europe
6	R1	(Italy) Autodromo Nazionale di Monza, Monza	19–20 October	Euroformula Open Championship; International GT Open; Alpine Elf Europa Cup; Renault Clio Cup Series	2024 GT Cup Open Europe is located in Europe
6	R2	(Italy) Autodromo Nazionale di Monza, Monza	19–20 October	Euroformula Open Championship; International GT Open; Alpine Elf Europa Cup; Renault Clio Cup Series	2024 GT Cup Open Europe is located in Europe

== Entry list ==
Team	Car	No.	Drivers	Class	Rounds
(Belgium) Street Art Racing	Ferrari 488 Challenge	007	(Switzerland) Pascal Bachmann	Am	1, 4, 6
(Belgium) Street Art Racing	Ferrari 488 Challenge	007	(France) Jahid Fazal-Karim	Am	1, 4, 6
(Belgium) Speedlover	Porsche 992 GT3 Cup	7	(Belgium) Philippe Wils	Am	2–4
(Italy) Scuderia Villorba Corse	Lamborghini Huracán Super Trofeo Evo2	8	(San Marino) Luciano Privitellio	Am	5–6
(Belgium) Q1-trackracing	Porsche 992 GT3 Cup	11	(Belgium) Stienes Longin	PA	All
(Belgium) Q1-trackracing	Porsche 992 GT3 Cup	11	(Belgium) Nicolas Saelens	PA	All
(Belgium) Q1-trackracing	Porsche 992 GT3 Cup	52	(Belgium) Nathan Brauns	Am	All
(Belgium) Q1-trackracing	Porsche 992 GT3 Cup	52	(Belgium) Laurent Vandervelde	Am	All
(Belgium) Q1-trackracing	Porsche 992 GT3 Cup	53	(Belgium) Xander Przybylak	PA	1–5
(Belgium) Q1-trackracing	Porsche 992 GT3 Cup	53	(Belgium) Lars Zaenen	PA	1–5
(Belgium) Q1-trackracing	Porsche 992 GT3 Cup	57	(Romania) Bogdan Duma	Am	1–5
(Belgium) Q1-trackracing	Porsche 992 GT3 Cup	57	(Belgium) Nicolas Vandierendonck	Am	All
(Italy) SP Racing Team	Porsche 992 GT3 Cup	12	(Italy) Glauco Solieri	Am	3, 6
(Italy) SP Racing Team	Porsche 992 GT3 Cup	44	(Italy) Eugenio Pisan	PA	6
(Italy) SP Racing Team	Porsche 992 GT3 Cup	44	(Italy) Stefano Zerbi	PA	6
(San Marino) GDL Racing	Porsche 992 GT3 Cup	12	(Italy) Glauco Solieri	Am	1
(San Marino) GDL Racing	Porsche 992 GT3 Cup	43	(United States) Jim Michaelian	Am	4, 6
(San Marino) GDL Racing	Porsche 992 GT3 Cup	66	(Italy) Roberto Fecchio	Am	5
(San Marino) GDL Racing	Porsche 992 GT3 Cup	67	(Italy) Federico Al Rifai	PA	All
(San Marino) GDL Racing	Porsche 992 GT3 Cup	67	(Italy) Matteo Luvisi	PA	All
(Spain) Volcano Motorsport	Porsche 992 GT3 Cup	16	Evgenii Leonov (Note: Leonov is Russian, but he competes as neutral competitors as Russian national emblems were banned by the FIA following the Russian invasion of Ukraine.)	PA	All
(Italy) Rossocorsa Racing	Ferrari 488 Challenge Evo	17	(Italy) Lorenzo Innocenti	PA	1–5
(Italy) Rossocorsa Racing	Ferrari 488 Challenge Evo	17	(Italy) Andrea Belicchi	PA	1–2, 5
(Italy) Rossocorsa Racing	Ferrari 488 Challenge Evo	17	(Italy) Niccolò Schirò	PA	2–4
(Spain) Team Skualo Competicion	Porsche 992 GT3 Cup	19	(Spain) Álvaro Lobera	Am	5
(Spain) Team Skualo Competicion	Porsche 992 GT3 Cup	19	(Spain) Fernando Navarrete	Am	5
(Romania) RO1 Racing	Porsche 992 GT3 Cup	21	(Romania) Camil Perian	Am	All
(Romania) RO1 Racing	Porsche 992 GT3 Cup	21	(Romania) Florin Tincescu	Am	All
(Italy) ZRS Motorsport	Porsche 992 GT3 Cup	25	(Italy) Luciano Maria Micale	Am	5
(Italy) ZRS Motorsport	Porsche 992 GT3 Cup	25	(Italy) Paolo Prestipino	Am	5
(Italy) Racevent A.S.D.	Porsche 992 GT3 Cup	26	(Italy) Lodovico Laurini	PA	6
(Italy) Racevent A.S.D.	Porsche 992 GT3 Cup	26	(Guatemala) Ian Rodríguez	PA	6
(Italy) Racevent A.S.D.	Porsche 992 GT3 Cup	27	(Italy) Costantino Peron	PA	6
(Italy) Racevent A.S.D.	Porsche 992 GT3 Cup	27	(Italy) Giovanni Berton	PA	6
(Estonia) EST1 Racing	Porsche 992 GT3 Cup	47	(Estonia) Alex Reimann	PA	1, 3–5
(Estonia) EST1 Racing	Porsche 992 GT3 Cup	77	(Estonia) Indrek Jaaska	Am	1, 4
(Estonia) EST1 Racing	Porsche 992 GT3 Cup	91	(Venezuela) Javier Ripoli Jr.	Am	4–5
(Belgium) National Autoclub Excelsior	Porsche 992 GT3 Cup	54	(Belgium) Dylan Derdaele	PA	2
(Belgium) National Autoclub Excelsior	Porsche 992 GT3 Cup	54	(Belgium) Jan Lauryssen	PA	2
(Ukraine) Tsunami RT	Porsche 992 GT3 Cup	69	(Italy) Dario Baruchelli	Am	1
(Ukraine) Tsunami RT	Porsche 992 GT3 Cup	69	(Italy) Beppe Ghezzi	Am	1
(Ukraine) Tsunami RT	Porsche 992 GT3 Cup	78	(Italy) Fabio Babini	PA	All
(Ukraine) Tsunami RT	Porsche 992 GT3 Cup	78	(Italy) Davide Scanniccio	PA	All
(Ukraine) Tsunami RT	Porsche 992 GT3 Cup	79	(Italy) Johannes Zelger	Am	All
(Germany) Mertel Motorsport	Ferrari 488 Challenge Evo	80	(Germany) Luca Ludwig	PA	All
(Germany) Mertel Motorsport	Ferrari 488 Challenge Evo	80	(Spain) Iván Velasco	PA	All
(Germany) Mertel Motorsport	Ferrari 488 Challenge Evo	81	(Spain) Álvaro Lobera	Am	1–4
(Germany) Mertel Motorsport	Ferrari 488 Challenge Evo	81	(Spain) Fernando Navarrete	Am	1–4
(Germany) Mertel Motorsport	Ferrari 488 Challenge Evo	81	(United Kingdom) Steven Liquorish	Am	5–6
(Germany) Mertel Motorsport	Ferrari 488 Challenge Evo	81	(Italy) Mauro Trentin	Am	5–6
(Germany) Mertel Motorsport	Ferrari 488 Challenge Evo	82	(Netherlands) Leon Rijnbeek	Am	All
(Germany) Mertel Motorsport	Ferrari 488 Challenge Evo	82	(Italy) Mark Speakerwas	Am	All
(Germany) Mertel Motorsport	Ferrari 488 Challenge Evo	83	(Spain) Alba Vázquez	Am	1–5
(Germany) Mertel Motorsport	Ferrari 488 Challenge Evo	83	(Netherlands) Laura van den Hengel	Am	All
(Germany) Mertel Motorsport	Ferrari 488 Challenge Evo	83	(Italy) Tommaso Lovati	Am	6
(Germany) Mertel Motorsport	Ferrari 488 Challenge Evo	84	(Italy) Stefano Bozzoni	PA	1–5
(Germany) Mertel Motorsport	Ferrari 488 Challenge Evo	84	(Spain) Arturo Melgar	PA	All
(Germany) Mertel Motorsport	Ferrari 488 Challenge Evo	84	(Spain) Alba Vázquez	PA	6
(Germany) Mertel Motorsport	Ferrari 488 Challenge Evo	85	(Spain) Jorge Cabezas	PA	All
(Germany) Mertel Motorsport	Ferrari 488 Challenge Evo	85	(Switzerland) Anny Frosio	PA	All
(Germany) Mertel Motorsport	Ferrari 488 Challenge Evo	86	(Germany) Martinus Richter	Am	2, 4
(Germany) Mertel Motorsport	Ferrari 488 Challenge Evo	86	(Georgia (country)) Davit Kajaia	Am	2
(Switzerland) Centri Porsche Ticino	Porsche 992 GT3 Cup	92	(Switzerland) Ivan Jacoma	Am	5
(Switzerland) Centri Porsche Ticino	Porsche 992 GT3 Cup	92	(Italy) Valerio Presezzi	Am	5
(Italy) Enrico Fulgenzi Racing	Porsche 992 GT3 Cup	117	(Italy) Enrico Fulgenzi	PA	5
(Italy) Enrico Fulgenzi Racing	Porsche 992 GT3 Cup	117	(United States) Eric Wagner	PA	5
(Portugal) Racar Motorsport	Porsche 992 GT3 Cup	911	(Brazil) Leandro Martins	Am	All
(Portugal) Racar Motorsport	Porsche 992 GT3 Cup	911	(Austria) Dieter Svepes	Am	All
(Italy) Hrt by Ps Performance	Porsche 992 GT3 Cup	992	(Italy) Filippo Raddino	Am	6
(Italy) Hrt by Ps Performance	Porsche 992 GT3 Cup	992	(Italy) Edoardo Buganè	Am	6

Icon	Class
PA	Pro-Am Cup
Am	Am Cup

== Race results ==
Bold indicates overall winner.

Round		Circuit	Pole position	Pro-Am Winner	Am Winner
1	R1	(Portugal) Algarve International Circuit	(San Marino) No. 67 GDL Racing	(Germany) No. 80 Mertel Motorsport	**(Portugal) No. 911 Racar Motorsport**
1	R1	(Portugal) Algarve International Circuit	(Italy) Federico Al Rifai (Italy) Matteo Luvisi	(Germany) Luca Ludwig (Spain) Iván Velasco	**(Brazil) Leandro Martins** **(Austria) Dieter Svepes**
1	R2	(Portugal) Algarve International Circuit	(Italy) No. 17 Rossocorsa Racing	**(Belgium) No. 11 Q1-trackracing**	(Belgium) No. 52 Q1-trackracing
1	R2	(Portugal) Algarve International Circuit	(Italy) Andrea Belicchi (Italy) Lorenzo Innocenti	**(Belgium) Stienes Longin** **(Belgium) Nicolas Saelens**	(Belgium) Nathan Brauns (Belgium) Laurent Vandervelde
2	R1	(Germany) Hockenheimring	(Germany) No. 80 Mertel Motorsport	**(San Marino) No. 67 GDL Racing**	(Portugal) No. 911 Racar Motorsport
2	R1	(Germany) Hockenheimring	(Germany) Luca Ludwig (Spain) Iván Velasco	**(Italy) Federico Al Rifai** **(Italy) Matteo Luvisi**	(Brazil) Leandro Martins (Austria) Dieter Svepes
2	R2	(Germany) Hockenheimring	(Germany) No. 80 Mertel Motorsport	**(Germany) No. 80 Mertel Motorsport**	(Portugal) No. 911 Racar Motorsport
2	R2	(Germany) Hockenheimring	(Germany) Luca Ludwig (Spain) Iván Velasco	**(Germany) Luca Ludwig** **(Spain) Iván Velasco**	(Brazil) Leandro Martins (Austria) Dieter Svepes
3	R1	(Belgium) Circuit de Spa-Francorchamps	(Germany) No. 80 Mertel Motorsport	**(Germany) No. 80 Mertel Motorsport**	(Belgium) No. 52 Q1-trackracing
3	R1	(Belgium) Circuit de Spa-Francorchamps	(Germany) Luca Ludwig (Spain) Iván Velasco	**(Germany) Luca Ludwig** **(Spain) Iván Velasco**	(Belgium) Nathan Brauns (Belgium) Laurent Vandervelde
3	R2	(Belgium) Circuit de Spa-Francorchamps	(San Marino) No. 67 GDL Racing	**(San Marino) No. 67 GDL Racing**	(Belgium) No. 57 Q1-trackracing
3	R2	(Belgium) Circuit de Spa-Francorchamps	(Italy) Federico Al Rifai (Italy) Matteo Luvisi	**(Italy) Federico Al Rifai** **(Italy) Matteo Luvisi**	(Romania) Bogdan Duma (Belgium) Nicolas Vandierendonck
4	R1	(France) Circuit Paul Ricard	(San Marino) No. 67 GDL Racing	**(Germany) No. 80 Mertel Motorsport**	(Portugal) No. 911 Racar Motorsport
4	R1	(France) Circuit Paul Ricard	(Italy) Federico Al Rifai (Italy) Matteo Luvisi	**(Germany) Luca Ludwig** **(Spain) Iván Velasco**	(Brazil) Leandro Martins (Austria) Dieter Svepes
4	R2	(France) Circuit Paul Ricard	(Italy) No. 17 Rossocorsa Racing	**(Belgium) No. 11 Q1-trackracing**	(Germany) No. 81 Mertel Motorsport
4	R2	(France) Circuit Paul Ricard	(Italy) Niccolò Schirò (Italy) Lorenzo Innocenti	**(Belgium) Stienes Longin** **(Belgium) Nicolas Saelens**	(Spain) Álvaro Lobera (Spain) Fernando Navarrete
5	R1	(Spain) Circuit de Barcelona-Catalunya	(San Marino) No. 67 GDL Racing	**(San Marino) No. 67 GDL Racing**	(Portugal) No. 911 Racar Motorsport
5	R1	(Spain) Circuit de Barcelona-Catalunya	(Italy) Federico Al Rifai (Italy) Matteo Luvisi	**(Italy) Federico Al Rifai** **(Italy) Matteo Luvisi**	(Brazil) Leandro Martins (Austria) Dieter Svepes
5	R2	(Spain) Circuit de Barcelona-Catalunya	(San Marino) No. 67 GDL Racing	**(Belgium) No. 53 Q1-trackracing**	(Portugal) No. 911 Racar Motorsport
5	R2	(Spain) Circuit de Barcelona-Catalunya	(Italy) Federico Al Rifai (Italy) Matteo Luvisi	**(Belgium) Xander Przybylak** **(Belgium) Lars Zaenen**	(Brazil) Leandro Martins (Austria) Dieter Svepes
6	R1	(Italy) Autodromo Nazionale di Monza	(Belgium) No. 11 Q1-trackracing	**(Belgium) No. 11 Q1-trackracing**	(Belgium) No. 57 Q1-trackracing
6	R1	(Italy) Autodromo Nazionale di Monza	(Belgium) Stienes Longin (Belgium) Nicolas Saelens	**(Belgium) Stienes Longin** **(Belgium) Nicolas Saelens**	(Belgium) Nicolas Vandierendonck
6	R2	(Italy) Autodromo Nazionale di Monza	(Italy) No. 26 Racevent A.S.D.	**(Germany) No. 80 Mertel Motorsport**	(Portugal) No. 911 Racar Motorsport
6	R2	(Italy) Autodromo Nazionale di Monza	(Italy) Lodovico Laurini (Guatemala) Ian Rodríguez	**(Germany) Luca Ludwig** **(Spain) Iván Velasco**	(Brazil) Leandro Martins (Austria) Dieter Svepes

== Championship standings ==
=== Points systems ===
Points are awarded to the top 10 (Pro) or top 6 (Am, Pro-Am, Teams) classified finishers. If less than 6 participants start the race or if less than 75% of the original race distance is completed, half points are awarded. For the Endurance Race (Spa, Monza) points are multiplied by 2. At the end of the season, the 2 lowest race scores are dropped; if the points dropped are those obtained in endurance races, that will count as 2 races; however, the dropped races cannot be the result of disqualification or race bans.

==== Overall ====
Position	1st	2nd	3rd	4th	5th	6th	7th	8th	9th	10th
Points	15	12	10	8	6	5	4	3	2	1

==== Pro-Am, Am and Teams ====
Position	1st	2nd	3rd	4th	5th	6th
Points	10	8	6	4	3	2
