= Suleiman Zanfari =

Moroccan racing driver

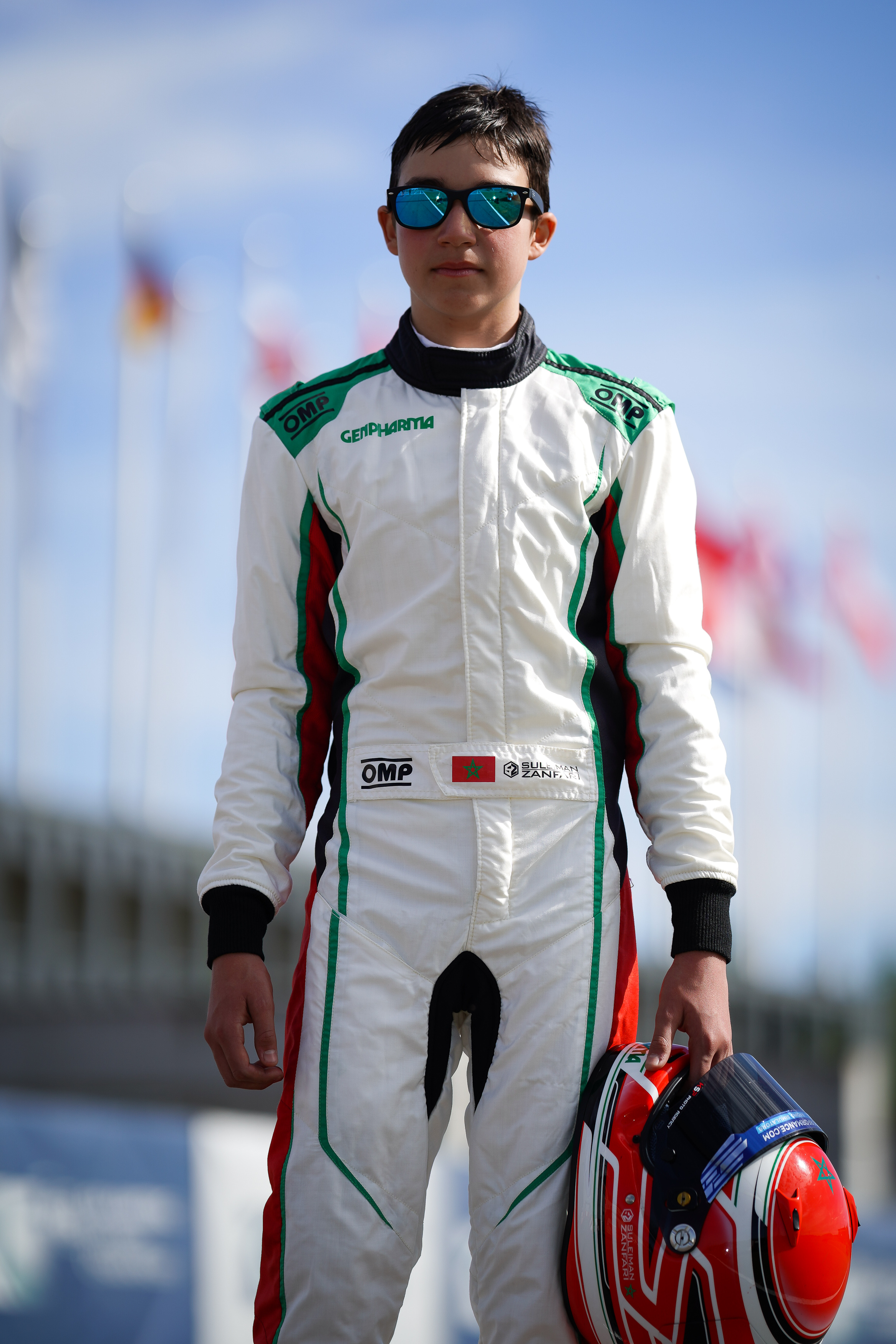
- Zanfari in June 2019.
- Nationality: (Morocco) Moroccan
- Born: 11 July 2005 (age 21) El Jadida, Morocco

Eurocup-3 career
- Debut season: 2023
- Current team: Campos Racing
- Car number: 52
- Starts: 16 (17 entries)
- Wins: 0
- Podiums: 1
- Poles: 1
- Fastest laps: 0
- Best finish: 9th in 2023

Previous series
- 2022 2021 2020–2022 2019: Formula 4 UAE Championship; Italian F4 Championship; F4 Spanish Championship; Ginetta Junior Championship

Suleiman Zanfari (born 11 July 2005 in El Jadida) is a Moroccan racing driver who is currently racing in the 2024 Eurocup-3 season with Campos Racing.

== Career ==
=== Karting ===
Zanfari started karting competitively in Italy at the age of eight. At the age of ten, he started training with the Campos Academy. In 2018, he finished fourth in the OK Junior category of the Italian Karting Championship and seventh in the Karting Academy Trophy. In 2019, he became the OK Junior champion of the Swedish Karting Championship. Following his success in the Swedish Championship, he also competed in the Karting World Championship.

=== Ginetta Junior Championship ===
In 2019, Zanfari made his car racing debut in the Ginetta Junior Championship by competing in the final two rounds with Elite Motorsport.

=== Formula 4 ===
==== 2020 ====
In 2020, Zanfari made his single-seater racing debut in the F4 Spanish Championship for Global Racing Service. He finished the season in seventeenth after scoring his maiden pole at Circuito de Jerez.

==== 2021 ====
In 2021, Zanfari joined MP Motorsport in the F4 Spanish Championship. He finished the season in eleventh. He also joined Cram Motorsport to compete in the opening round of the Italian F4 Championship.

==== 2022 ====
In 2022, Zanfari remained with MP Motorsport. In addition to competing in the F4 Spanish Championship he also competed in the Formula 4 UAE Championship. In the Formula 4 UAE Championship, he finished seventeenth in the drivers' standings. In the opening round of F4 Spanish Championship at Algarve International Circuit, he claimed his first podium in the series. At the end of the season, he was seventh in the drivers' standings after having to withdraw from the final two rounds for medical reasons.

=== Eurocup-3 ===
==== 2023 ====
In 2023, Zanfari joined Campos Racing to compete in the inaugural Eurocup-3 season.

==== 2024 ====
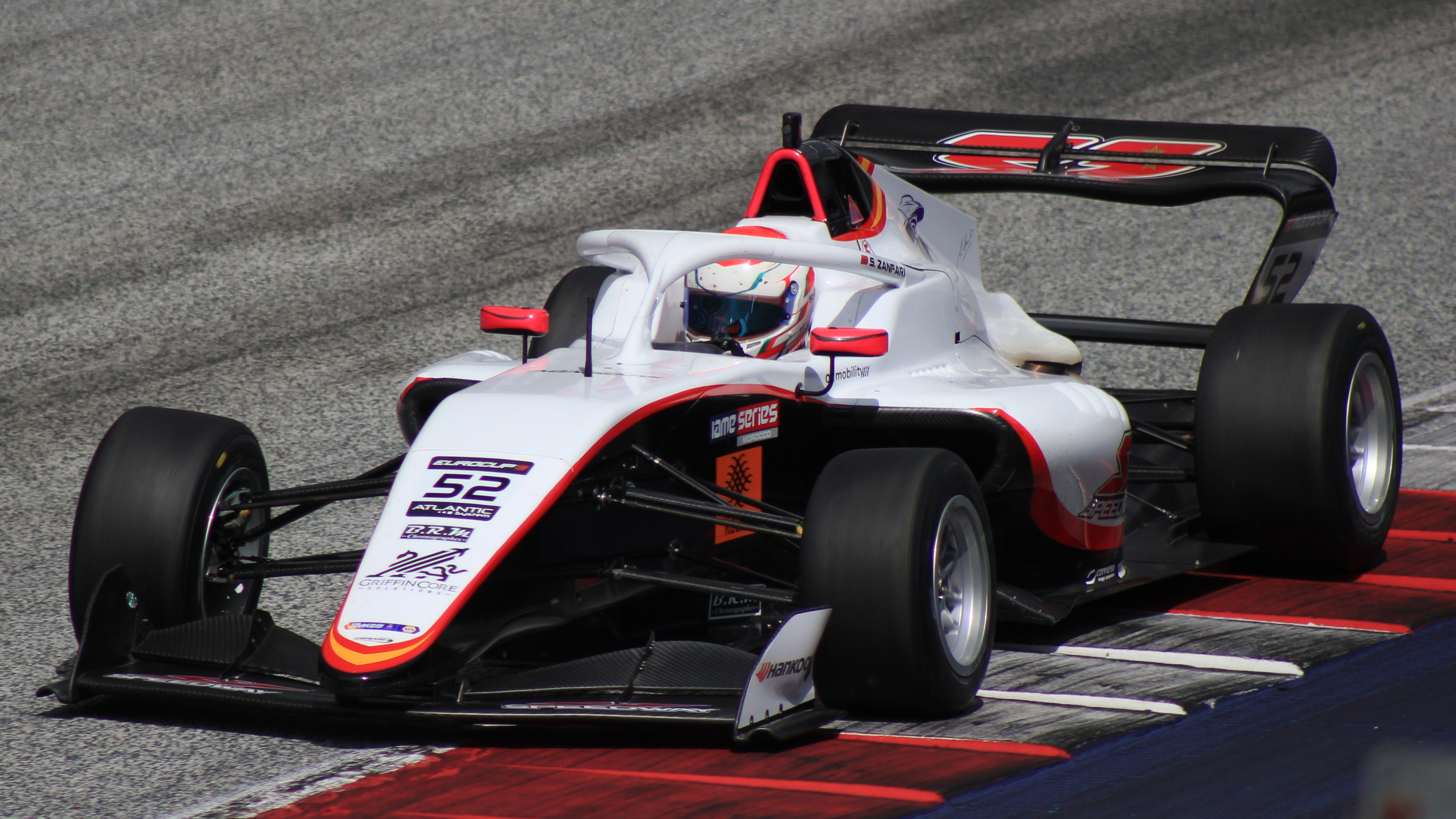
Zanfari racing at the Red Bull Ring during the 2024 Eurocup-3 season.

Zanfari remained with Campos Racing for the 2024 Eurocup-3 season.

=== Sports car racing ===
In 2023, Zanfari also made his debut in sports car racing, competing for MMi Motorsport in the Prototype Cup Germany. Together with Enzo Scionti, he contested the round at Circuit Zandvoort as a guest driver.

== Racing record ==
=== Racing career summary ===
Season	Series	Team	Races	Wins	Poles	F. Laps	Podiums	Points	Position
2019	Ginetta Junior Championship	Elite Motorsport	6	0	0	0	0	28	27th
2020	F4 Spanish Championship	Global Racing Service	21	0	1	0	0	19	17th
2021	F4 Spanish Championship	MP Motorsport	21	0	0	0	0	52	11th
2021	Italian F4 Championship	Cram Motorsport	3	0	0	0	0	0	44th
2022	Formula 4 UAE Championship	MP Motorsport	20	0	0	0	0	26	17th
2022	F4 Spanish Championship	MP Motorsport	15	0	0	0	1	70	7th
2023	Eurocup-3	Campos Racing	15	0	0	0	1	45	9th
2023	Prototype Cup Germany	MMi Motorsport	2	0	0	0	0	0	NC†
2023	F4 Saudi Arabian Championship - Trophy Event	Altawkilat Meritus.GP	8	2	4	2	4	N/A	NC
2024	F4 Saudi Arabian Championship	Altawkilat Meritus.GP	16	2	0	1	2	102	8th
2024	Eurocup-3	Campos Racing	4	0	0	0	0	11	17th
2024	GT4 European Series - Silver	Allied-Racing	2	0	0	0	0	0	NC

^{*} Season still in progress.

=== Complete Ginetta Junior Championship results ===
(key) (Races in bold indicate pole position) (Races in italics indicate fastest lap)

Year	Team	1	2	3	4	5	6	7	8	9	10	11	12	13	14	15	16	17	18	19	20	21	22	23	24	25	26	27	DC	Points
2019	Elite Motorsport	BHI; 1	BHI; 2	DON; 1	DON; 2	DON; 3	THR1; 1	THR1; 2	CRO; 1	CRO; 2	OUL; 1	OUL; 2	SNE; 1	SNE; 2	SNE; 3	SNE; 4	THR2; 1	THR2; 2	THR2; 3	KNO; 1	KNO; 2	KNO; 3	SIL; 1; 18	SIL; 2; 16	SIL; 3; 17	BHGP; 1; 17	BHGP; 2; 13	BHGP; 3; 17	27th	28

=== Complete F4 Spanish Championship results ===
(key) (Races in bold indicate pole position) (Races in italics indicate fastest lap)

Year	Team	1	2	3	4	5	6	7	8	9	10	11	12	13	14	15	16	17	18	19	20	21	DC	Points
2020	Global Racing Service	NAV; 1; 14	NAV; 2; 16	NAV; 3; 13	LEC; 1; 12	LEC; 2; 19†	LEC; 3; 9	JER; 1 DSQ	**JER**; **2** DSQ	JER; 3; 9	CRT; 1; 16	CRT; 2; 5	CRT; 3; 19	ARA; 1; 11	ARA; 2; 13	ARA; 3; 7	JAR; 1; 12	JAR; 2; 6	JAR; 3; 10	CAT; 1; 15	CAT; 2; 12	CAT; 3; 16	16th	22
2021	MP Motorsport	SPA; 1; 12	SPA; 2; 12	SPA; 3 Ret	NAV; 1; 10	NAV; 2; 8	NAV; 3; 15	ALG; 1; 20	ALG; 2; 10	ALG; 3; 9	ARA; 1; 11	ARA; 2; 14	ARA; 3; 15	CRT; 1; 4	CRT; 2; 14	CRT; 3; 6	JER; 1; 7	JER; 2; 8	JER; 3; 4	CAT; 1; 21	CAT; 2; 8	CAT; 3; 6	11th	52
2022	MP Motorsports	ALG; 1; 5	ALG; 2; 3	ALG; 3; 6	JER; 1; 14	JER; 2; 15	JER; 3; 4	CRT; 1; 6	CRT; 2; 6	CRT; 3; 17	SPA; 1; 10	SPA; 2; 13	SPA; 3; 5	ARA; 1 Ret	ARA; 2; 8	ARA; 3; 7	NAV; 1	NAV; 2	NAV; 3	CAT; 1	CAT; 2	CAT; 3	7th	70

=== Complete Formula 4 UAE Championship results ===
(key) (Races in bold indicate pole position) (Races in italics indicate fastest lap)

Year	Team	1	2	3	4	5	6	7	8	9	10	11	12	13	14	15	16	17	18	19	20	DC	Points
2022	MP Motorsport	YMC1; 1 Ret	YMC1; 2; 14	YMC1; 3; 10	YMC1; 4; 12	DUB1; 1; 13	DUB1; 2; 13	DUB1; 3; 11	DUB1; 4; 4	DUB2; 1; 11	DUB2; 2; 22	DUB2; 3; 12	DUB2; 4; 26†	DUB3; 1 Ret	DUB3; 2 Ret	DUB3; 3; 15	DUB3; 4; 14	YMC2; 1; 11	YMC2; 2; 10	YMC2; 3; 7	YMC2; 4; 7	17th	26

=== Complete Eurocup-3 results ===
(key) (Races in bold indicate pole position) (Races in italics indicate fastest lap)

Year	Team	1	2	3	4	5	6	7	8	9	10	11	12	13	14	15	16	17	DC	Points
2023	Campos Racing	SPA; 1; 3	SPA; 2; 11	ARA; 1; 7	ARA; 2; 5	MNZ; 1; 12	MNZ; 2; 13	ZAN; 1; 7	ZAN; 2; 11	JER; 1 DNS	JER; 2; 12	EST; 1; 12	EST; 2; 12	CRT; 1; 7	CRT; 2 Ret	CAT; 1; 9	CAT; 2 Ret		9th	45
2024	Campos Racing	SPA; 1; 5	SPA; 2 C	RBR; 1 DNS	RBR; 2 DNS	POR; 1; 19†	POR; 2; 19	POR; 3; 10	LEC; 1	LEC; 2	ZAN; 1	ZAN; 2	ARA; 1	ARA; 2	JER; 1	JER; 2	CAT; 1	CAT; 2	17th	11

* Season still in progress.

=== Complete F4 Saudi Arabian Championship results ===
(key) (Races in bold indicate pole position; races in italics indicate fastest lap)

Year	Team	1	2	3	4	5	6	7	8	9	10	11	12	13	14	15	16	17	DC	Points
2024	Altawkilat Meritus.GP	KMT1; 1; 1	KMT1; 2; 4	KMT1; 3; 9	KMT1; 4; 4	LSL; 1; 4	LSL; 2 Ret	LSL; 3; 10	LSL; 4; 7	JED1; 1; 8	JED1; 2; 10†	JED1; 3; 7	JED2; 1 Ret	JED2; 2; 10†	JED2; 3 WD	JED3; 1; 5	JED3; 2; 1	JED3; 3; 7	8th	102
