= Federico Al Rifai =

Emirati-Italian racing driver (born 2007)

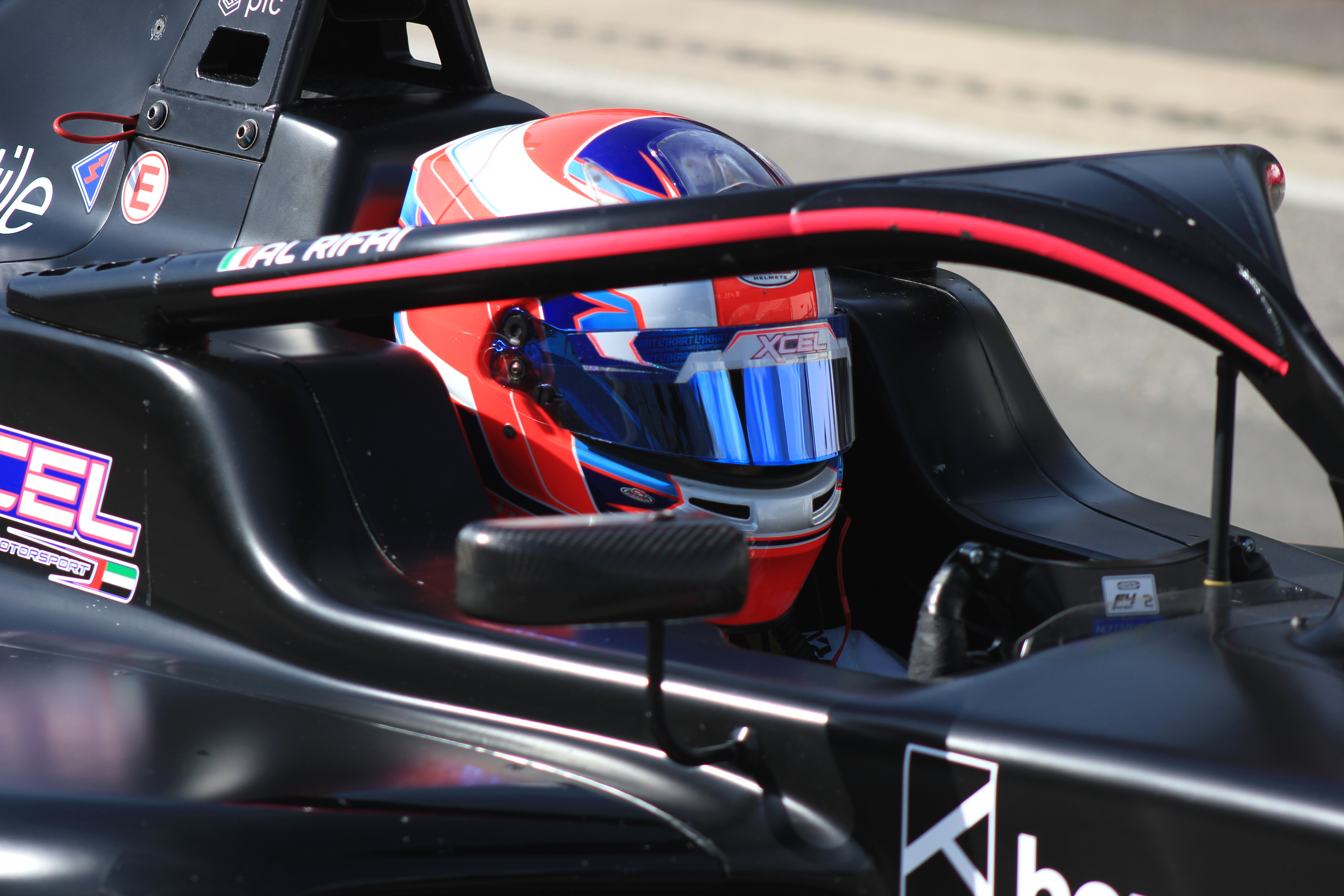
- Nationality: United Arab Emirates; Italy
- Born: 23 April 2007 (age 19) Italy

GT Cup Open Europe career
- Debut season: 2024
- Current team: GDL Racing

F4 Saudi Arabian Championship
- Categorisation: FIA Silver
- Years active: 2024
- Teams: Altawkilat Meritus.GP
- Car number: 12
- Starts: 16
- Wins: 7
- Podiums: 10
- Poles: 5
- Fastest laps: 5
- Best finish: 1st in 2024

Previous series
- 2023 2023 2024: F4 Spanish Championship; Formula 4 UAE Championship; F4 Saudi Arabian Championship

Championship titles
- 2024: F4 Saudi Arabian Championship

Federico Al Rifai (born 23 April 2007) is an Emirati-Italian racing driver who was born in Italy. He is the 2024 Saudi Arabian F4 champion. He most recently contested the 2024 GT Cup Open Europe, driving for GDL Racing.

== Career ==
=== Karting ===
Al Rifai spent most of his karting career moving from the UAE to Europe over the years. He made his European stage debut at the end of 2019, driving in the IAME International Final, in the X30 Mini category. He finished 30th in the finale. Over that winter, Al Rifai won the IAME Series UAE in the same category. He then had a quiet 2020, but at the beginning of 2021 he joined the X30 Junior class of IAME UAE, finishing third in the championship. He then spent the rest of 2021 in international competition, with a best result of fifth at the end of the year in the Rotax Max Challenge Grand Finals at Sakhir. Al Rifai then won IAME UAE in his final championship in the X30 Junior category at the beginning of 2022. He then moved up to senior karting, driving in the Italian championship, before switching to cars at the end of the year.

=== Formula 4 ===
==== 2023 ====
In late 2022, Al Rifai was confirmed to be competing for Xcel Motorsport in the Formula 4 UAE Trophy Round. In his first two races in single-seaters, Al Rifai finished sixth and fifth place respectively. After his strong performances in the Trophy Round, Al Rifai was announced to be driving for Xcel for the full 2023 Formula 4 UAE Championship. He instantly impressed, scoring 43 points over the course of fifteen races, and he managed to finish 12th in the championship standings with a best race result of fourth. For the remainder of the season, Al Rifai would be competing in the 2023 F4 Spanish Championship with Rodin Carlin. Unfortunately, Al Rifai had an underwhelming season, finishing 22nd in the standings with just three points to his name.

==== 2024 ====
Al Rifai returned to the UAE F4 Trophy Round at the end of 2023. He finished second in both races, with a fastest lap to his name in race 1. Al Rifai was then announced to be competing in the F4 Saudi Arabian Championship Trophy Round. He won one of the four races, finishing on the podium three times. For his 2024 winter programme, Al Rifai would be joining the grid for the full 2024 F4 Saudi Arabian Championship. He had a breakthrough season, and after a season-long title fight with Serbian driver Andrej Petrović, Al Rifai came out on top with eight victories and twelve podiums, as he won the championship, finishing with 269.5 points.

=== Sports car racing ===
In 2024, Al Rifai announced that he would be joining the 2024 GT Cup Open Europe, driving the No. 67 Porsche 992 run by GDL Racing alongside Matteo Luvisi in his first venture into the world of sports car racing. He secured pole position in his first race in the championship at Algarve, and the pair took their first victory at the Hockenheimring. Al Rifai and Luvisi finished their rookie season in the championship an impressive second, securing a total of three wins and six podiums on the way.

== Karting record ==
=== Karting career summary ===
Season	Series	Team (s)	Position
2018-19	IAME Series UAE - X30 Cadet		4th
2019	British Kart Championship - Honda Cadet		56th
2019	IAME International Final - X30 Mini		30th
2019-20	IAME Series UAE - X30 Mini		1st
2020	Rotax Max Challenge International Trophy - Rotax Junior	KR Sport	19th
2020-21	IAME Series UAE - X30 Junior		3rd
2021	IAME Euro Series - X30 Junior	KR Sport	25th
2021	CIK-FIA Academy Trophy - Academy	Salim Al Rifai	26th
2021	Rotax Max Challenge Grand Finals - Rotax Junior	Al Ain Raceway	5th
2021	IAME Warriors Final - X30 Junior	KR Sport	24th
2021-22	IAME Series UAE - X30 Junior		1st
2022	IAME Euro Series - X30 Senior	KR Sport	118th
2022	Italian ACI Championship - X30 Senior		75th

== Racing record ==
=== Racing career summary ===
Season	Series	Team	Races	Wins	Poles	F/Laps	Podiums	Points	Position
2022	Formula 4 UAE Championship - Trophy Round	Xcel Motorsport	2	0	0	0	0	N/A	NC
2023	Formula 4 UAE Championship	Xcel Motorsport	15	0	0	0	0	43	12th
2023	Formula 4 UAE Championship - Trophy Round	Xcel Motorsport	2	0	0	1	2	N/A	NC
2023	F4 Spanish Championship	Rodin Carlin	21	0	0	0	0	3	22nd
2023	F4 Saudi Arabian Championship - Trophy Event	Altawkilat Meritus.GP	8	2	0	3	4	N/A	NC
2024	F4 Saudi Arabian Championship	Altawkilat Meritus.GP	16	7	5	5	10	226	**1st**
2024	GT Cup Open Europe	GDL Racing	12	3	4	1	6	59	**2nd**
2024	Ferrari Challenge Europe - Trofeo Pirelli (Pro-Am)	Rossocorsa	2	1	1	1	1	24	13th
2025	GT World Challenge Europe Endurance Cup	Dinamic GT	5	0	0	0	0	0	NC
2026	Italian GT Championship Endurance Cup - GT Cup	Spirit of Race							
2026	Italian GT Championship Sprint Cup - GT Cup	Spirit of Race							

=== Complete Formula 4 UAE Championship results ===
(key) (Races in bold indicate pole position) (Races in italics indicate fastest lap)

Year	Team	1	2	3	4	5	6	7	8	9	10	11	12	13	14	15	Pos	Points
2023	Xcel Motorsport	DUB1; 1; 37	DUB1; 2; 11	DUB1; 3 Ret	KMT1; 1; 32	KMT1; 2; 10	KMT1; 3; 5	KMT2; 1; 16	KMT2; 2; 11	KMT2; 3; 4	DUB2; 1; 13	DUB2; 2; 4	DUB2; 3; 17	YMC; 1; 6	YMC; 2; 13	YMC; 3; 20	12th	43

=== Complete F4 Spanish Championship results ===
(key) (Races in bold indicate pole position) (Races in italics indicate fastest lap)

Year	Team	1	2	3	4	5	6	7	8	9	10	11	12	13	14	15	16	17	18	19	20	21	DC	Points
2023	Rodin Carlin	SPA; 1; 23	SPA; 2; 9	SPA; 3; 9	ARA; 1; 28	ARA; 2; 11	ARA; 3; 23	NAV; 1; 21	NAV; 2; 21	NAV; 3; 18	JER; 1; 18	JER; 2; 18	JER; 3; 16	EST; 1; 13	EST; 2; 12	EST; 3; 11	CRT; 1; 27	CRT; 2; 14	CRT; 3; 14	CAT; 1; 30	CAT; 2; 20	CAT; 3 Ret	22nd	3

=== Complete F4 Saudi Arabian Championship results ===
(key) (Races in bold indicate pole position; races in italics indicate fastest lap)

Year	Team	1	2	3	4	5	6	7	8	9	10	11	12	13	14	15	16	17	DC	Points
2024	Altawkilat Meritus.GP	**KMT1**; **1**; 11	KMT1; 2; 1	KMT1; 3; 5	**KMT1**; **4**; 1	**LSL**; **1**; 1	LSL; 2; 4	LSL; 3; 9	**LSL**; **4**; 1	JED1; 1; 3	JED1; 2 WD	JED1; 3; 5	JED2; 1; 3	JED2; 2; 1	JED2; 3; 1	JED3; 1; 1	JED3; 2; 4	**JED3**; **3**; 2	1st	226
