= 2024 F4 Saudi Arabian Championship =

Motorsport season

The 2024 Formula 4 Saudi Arabian Championship was the inaugural season of the F4 Saudi Arabian Championship. It was a motor racing championship for open wheel, formula racing cars regulated according to FIA Formula 4 regulations. The season commenced on 14 December 2023 with a non-championship Trophy Event at Bahrain International Circuit in Bahrain. The regular season began on 1 February at Kuwait Motor Town in Kuwait and concludes on 6 April 2024 at Jeddah Corniche Circuit in Saudi Arabia.

== Teams and drivers ==
All cars were run by Altawkilat Meritus.GP.

Icon	Legend
R	Rookie
G	Guest drivers ineligible to score points

No.	Driver	Class	Rounds
3	(Saudi Arabia) Saud Al Saud		3
5	(Kuwait) Saqer Al-Maosherji	R	NC1, NC2, All
7	(Saudi Arabia) Faisal Alkabbani		NC1, NC2, All
8	(United Arab Emirates) Hamda Al Qubaisi		NC1, NC2, All
9	(United Arab Emirates) Abdullah Al Qubaisi		NC2, 1
77	(United Arab Emirates) Abdullah Al Qubaisi		4–5
10	(United Arab Emirates) Federico Al Rifai		NC2, All
12	(United Arab Emirates) Federico Al Rifai		NC1
11	(Austria) Oscar Wurz		NC1, NC2, All
18	(Saudi Arabia) Omar Aldereyaane	R	NC1, NC2, All
22	(Belgium) Aurelia Nobels		2
23	(Kyrgyzstan) Kirill Kutskov (Note: Kutskov is Russian, but he competes under a Kyrgyz licence as Russian national emblems were banned by the FIA following the Russian invasion of Ukraine.)	R	NC1, NC2, All
33	(Saudi Arabia) Abdulaziz Altayar	R	NC1
49	(Serbia) Andrej Petrović	R	NC2, All
52	(Morocco) Suleiman Zanfari		NC1, NC2, All
55	(Switzerland) Laura Villars		NC2, All
66	(Germany) Montego Maassen	R	NC1
77	(Philippines) Juancho Brobio	R	NC2, 1–2
88	(United Arab Emirates) Amna Al Qubaisi		NC1, NC2, All
96	(Qatar) Jabor Al-Thani	R	NC1, NC2, All
96	(Republic of Ireland) Lucca Allen	G	1
99	(Saudi Arabia) Abdulaziz Abuzenadah		NC1, NC2, All

== Calendar ==
Initially, the schedule consisted of twenty-four races over six rounds across four countries. The planned season opener at Bahrain International Circuit was converted into the Trophy Event round. Furthermore, the last two competitions at Jeddah Corniche Circuit were converted into three triple-headers. The round at Kuwait Motor Town on 8–10 February was retroactively downgraded to another nonscoring Trophy Event round.

Round		Circuit	Date	Pole position	Fastest lap	Winning driver	Rookie winner	Supporting
2023
NC1	R1	Bahrain International Circuit, Sakhir	15 December	(Morocco) Suleiman Zanfari	(Morocco) Suleiman Zanfari	(Austria) Oscar Wurz	(Kuwait) Saqer Al-Maosherji	Porsche Carrera Cup Middle East
NC1	R2	Bahrain International Circuit, Sakhir	16 December		(United Arab Emirates) Federico Al Rifai	(Morocco) Suleiman Zanfari	(Germany) Montego Maassen	Porsche Carrera Cup Middle East
NC1	R3	Bahrain International Circuit, Sakhir	16 December	(Morocco) Suleiman Zanfari	(United Arab Emirates) Federico Al Rifai	(United Arab Emirates) Federico Al Rifai	(Kuwait) Saqer Al-Maosherji	Porsche Carrera Cup Middle East
NC1	R4	Bahrain International Circuit, Sakhir	16 December		(Austria) Oscar Wurz	(Austria) Oscar Wurz	(Saudi Arabia) Omar Aldereyaane	Porsche Carrera Cup Middle East
2024
1	R1	Kuwait Motor Town, Ali Sabah Al Salem	2 February	(United Arab Emirates) Federico Al Rifai	(United Arab Emirates) Federico Al Rifai	(Morocco) Suleiman Zanfari	(Kuwait) Saqer Al-Maosherji	Kuwait Motor Town Championship - 2K Race Series Radical Cup Kuwait; Toyota Gazoo Racing GR Yaris Cup Kuwait
1	R2	Kuwait Motor Town, Ali Sabah Al Salem	3 February		(Kuwait) Saqer Al-Maosherji	(United Arab Emirates) Federico Al Rifai	(Serbia) Andrej Petrović	Kuwait Motor Town Championship - 2K Race Series Radical Cup Kuwait; Toyota Gazoo Racing GR Yaris Cup Kuwait
1	R3	Kuwait Motor Town, Ali Sabah Al Salem	3 February		(United Arab Emirates) Hamda Al Qubaisi	(United Arab Emirates) Hamda Al Qubaisi	(Kuwait) Saqer Al-Maosherji	Kuwait Motor Town Championship - 2K Race Series Radical Cup Kuwait; Toyota Gazoo Racing GR Yaris Cup Kuwait
1	R4	Kuwait Motor Town, Ali Sabah Al Salem	3 February	(United Arab Emirates) Federico Al Rifai	(Morocco) Suleiman Zanfari	(United Arab Emirates) Federico Al Rifai	(Kyrgyzstan) Kirill Kutskov	Kuwait Motor Town Championship - 2K Race Series Radical Cup Kuwait; Toyota Gazoo Racing GR Yaris Cup Kuwait
NC2	R1	Kuwait Motor Town, Ali Sabah Al Salem	9 February	(Morocco) Suleiman Zanfari	(Morocco) Suleiman Zanfari	(Morocco) Suleiman Zanfari	(Serbia) Andrej Petrović	Stand-alone event
NC2	R2	Kuwait Motor Town, Ali Sabah Al Salem	10 February		(United Arab Emirates) Federico Al Rifai	(United Arab Emirates) Federico Al Rifai	(Serbia) Andrej Petrović	Stand-alone event
NC2	R3	Kuwait Motor Town, Ali Sabah Al Salem	10 February		(Kuwait) Saqer Al-Maosherji	(Kuwait) Saqer Al-Maosherji	(Kuwait) Saqer Al-Maosherji	Stand-alone event
NC2	R4	Kuwait Motor Town, Ali Sabah Al Salem	10 February	(Morocco) Suleiman Zanfari	(Serbia) Andrej Petrović	(Serbia) Andrej Petrović	(Serbia) Andrej Petrović	Stand-alone event
2	R1	(Qatar) Lusail International Circuit, Lusail	16 March	(United Arab Emirates) Federico Al Rifai	(Serbia) Andrej Petrović	(United Arab Emirates) Federico Al Rifai	(Serbia) Andrej Petrović	Stand-alone event
2	R2	(Qatar) Lusail International Circuit, Lusail	16 March		(United Arab Emirates) Amna Al Qubaisi	(Saudi Arabia) Faisal Alkabbani	(Saudi Arabia) Omar Aldereyaane	Stand-alone event
2	R3	(Qatar) Lusail International Circuit, Lusail	16 March		(Serbia) Andrej Petrović	(Saudi Arabia) Omar Aldereyaane	(Saudi Arabia) Omar Aldereyaane	Stand-alone event
2	R4	(Qatar) Lusail International Circuit, Lusail	17 March	(United Arab Emirates) Federico Al Rifai	(United Arab Emirates) Federico Al Rifai	(United Arab Emirates) Federico Al Rifai	(Kyrgyzstan) Kirill Kutskov	Stand-alone event
3	R1	(Saudi Arabia) Jeddah Corniche Circuit, Jeddah Corniche	28 March	(Serbia) Andrej Petrović	(Serbia) Andrej Petrović	(Serbia) Andrej Petrović	(Serbia) Andrej Petrović	Stand-alone event
3	R2	(Saudi Arabia) Jeddah Corniche Circuit, Jeddah Corniche	28 March		(Saudi Arabia) Faisal Alkabbani	(Saudi Arabia) Faisal Alkabbani	(Saudi Arabia) Omar Aldereyaane	Stand-alone event
3	R3	(Saudi Arabia) Jeddah Corniche Circuit, Jeddah Corniche	29 March	(Serbia) Andrej Petrović	(Serbia) Andrej Petrović	(Serbia) Andrej Petrović		Stand-alone event
4	R1	(Saudi Arabia) Jeddah Corniche Circuit, Jeddah Corniche	1 April	(Kuwait) Saqer Al-Maosherji	(Serbia) Andrej Petrović	(Kyrgyzstan) Kirill Kutskov	(Kyrgyzstan) Kirill Kutskov	Stand-alone event
4	R2	(Saudi Arabia) Jeddah Corniche Circuit, Jeddah Corniche	1 April		(Serbia) Andrej Petrović	(United Arab Emirates) Federico Al Rifai	(Serbia) Andrej Petrović	Stand-alone event
4	R3	(Saudi Arabia) Jeddah Corniche Circuit, Jeddah Corniche	2 April	(Kuwait) Saqer Al-Maosherji	(United Arab Emirates) Federico Al Rifai	(United Arab Emirates) Federico Al Rifai	(Kyrgyzstan) Kirill Kutskov	Stand-alone event
5	R1	(Saudi Arabia) Jeddah Corniche Circuit, Jeddah Corniche	6 April	(Serbia) Andrej Petrović	(United Arab Emirates) Federico Al Rifai	(United Arab Emirates) Federico Al Rifai	(Serbia) Andrej Petrović	Stand-alone event
5	R2	(Saudi Arabia) Jeddah Corniche Circuit, Jeddah Corniche	6 April		(United Arab Emirates) Federico Al Rifai	(Morocco) Suleiman Zanfari	(Kyrgyzstan) Kirill Kutskov	Stand-alone event
5	R3	(Saudi Arabia) Jeddah Corniche Circuit, Jeddah Corniche	7 April	(United Arab Emirates) Federico Al Rifai	(Serbia) Andrej Petrović	(Serbia) Andrej Petrović	(Serbia) Andrej Petrović	Stand-alone event

== Championship standings ==
Points were awarded to the top 10 finishers of each race, with reverse-grid races awarding half points. No points are awarded for pole position or fastest lap.

Round	Races	Position, points per race									
Round	Races	**1st**	**2nd**	**3rd**	**4th**	**5th**	**6th**	**7th**	**8th**	**9th**	**10th**
4-race round	Races 1 & 4	25	18	15	12	10	8	6	4	2	1
4-race round	Races 2 & 3	12.5	9	7.5	6	5	4	3	2	1	0.5
3-race round	Races 1 & 3	25	18	15	12	10	8	6	4	2	1
3-race round	Race 2	12.5	9	7.5	6	5	4	3	2	1	0.5

=== Drivers' Championship ===
Pos	Driver	BHR (Bahrain)				KMT1 (Kuwait)				KMT2 (Kuwait)				LSL (Qatar)				JED1 (Saudi Arabia)			JED2 (Saudi Arabia)			JED3 (Saudi Arabia)			Pts
Pos	Driver	R1	R2	R3	R4	R1	R2	R3	R4	R1	R2	R3	R4	R1	R2	R3	R4	R1	R2	R3	R1	R2	R3	R1	R2	R3	Pts
1	(United Arab Emirates) Federico Al Rifai	3	4	1	Ret	**11**	1	5	**1**	5	1	4	3	**1**	4	9	**1**	3	WD	5	3	1	1	1	4	**2**	226
2	(Serbia) Andrej Petrović					5	3	3	3	3	2	5	1	3	Ret	3	8	**1**	7	**1**	4	2	9†	**2**	3	1	193
3	(Kyrgyzstan) Kirill Kutskov	4	8	5	6	4	7	6	2	7	Ret	6	4	7	Ret	8	4	2	3	6	1	5	2	3	2	3	177.5
4	(United Arab Emirates) Hamda Al Qubaisi	Ret	6	2	7	3	2	1	10	8	5	8	7	5	7	11	2	5	8	3	Ret	6	10†	Ret	6	4	116.5
5	(Austria) Oscar Wurz	1	11†	3	1	Ret	Ret	4	DNS	2	Ret	7	5	2	3	4	5	4	WD	4	2	Ret	Ret	6	5	8	106.5
6	(Kuwait) Saqer Al-Maosherji	2	9	4	4	2	5	2	5	4	4	1	8	11	Ret	6	6	6	9†	2	**Ret**	4	**3**	Ret	8	9	106
7	(Saudi Arabia) Omar Aldereyaane	7	7	9	2	6	Ret	7	6	6	3	2	6	6	5	1	9	7	2	8	5	7	11†	4	7	5	103.5
8	(Morocco) Suleiman Zanfari	**11**†	1	**Ret**	3	1	4	9	4	**1**	6	9	**2**	4	Ret	10	7	8	10†	7	Ret	10†	WD	5	1	7	102
9	(Saudi Arabia) Faisal Alkabbani	12	2	8	9	7	6	10	Ret	9	Ret	3	9	9	1	2	11	Ret	1	12	6	3	5	10†	DNS	Ret	73
10	(United Arab Emirates) Amna Al Qubaisi	9	3	7	8	9	8	8	Ret	WD	WD	WD	WD	10	2	5	10	Ret	4	9	7	Ret	4	Ret	10†	6	56.5
11	(Belgium) Aurelia Nobels													8	6	7	3										26
12	(Qatar) Jabor Al-Thani	8	Ret	12	Ret	WD	WD	WD	WD	13	9	12	12	13	8	12	14	11	6	13	8	8	8	7	Ret	11	22
13	(United Arab Emirates) Abdullah Al Qubaisi					13	10	11	7	12	Ret	10	10								9	9	6	9	Ret	10	20.5
14	(Saudi Arabia) Abdulaziz Abuzenadah	10	Ret	11	Ret	DNS	11	Ret	9	14	10	Ret	13	14	10	14	13	10	WD	14	10	Ret	7	8	9	12	15.5
15	(Switzerland) Laura Villars					12	9	12	8	11	7	Ret	11	15	Ret	15†	12	9	5	10	WD	WD	WD	WD	WD	WD	13
16	(Philippines) Juancho Brobio					10	Ret	13	11	10	8	11	14	12	9	13	15										2
17	(Saudi Arabia) Saud Al Saud																	Ret	Ret	11							0
Guest drivers ineligible to score points
–	(Republic of Ireland) Lucca Allen					8	WD	WD	WD																		–
Trophy Event-only drivers
–	(Germany) Montego Maassen	5	5	6	5																						–
–	(Saudi Arabia) Abdulaziz Altayar	6	10	10	Ret																						–
Pos	Driver	R1	R2	R3	R4	R1	R2	R3	R4	R1	R2	R3	R4	R1	R2	R3	R4	R1	R2	R3	R1	R2	R3	R1	R2	R3	Pts
Pos	Driver	BHR (Bahrain)				KMT1 (Kuwait)				KMT2 (Kuwait)				LSL (Qatar)				JED1 (Saudi Arabia)			JED2 (Saudi Arabia)			JED3 (Saudi Arabia)			Pts

Colour	Result
Gold	Winner
Silver	Second place
Bronze	Third place
Green	Points classification
Blue	Non-points classification
Blue	Non-classified finish (NC)
Purple	Retired, not classified (Ret)
Red	Did not qualify (DNQ)
Red	Did not pre-qualify (DNPQ)
Black	Disqualified (DSQ)
White	Did not start (DNS)
White	Withdrew (WD)
White	Race cancelled (C)
Blank	Did not practice (DNP)
Blank	Did not arrive (DNA)
Blank	Excluded (EX)

**Bold** – Pole
Italics – Fastest Lap
† — Did not finish, but classified

=== Rookies' Championship ===
Pos	Driver	BHR (Bahrain)				KMT1 (Kuwait)				KMT2 (Kuwait)				LSL (Qatar)				JED1 (Saudi Arabia)			JED2 (Saudi Arabia)			JED3 (Saudi Arabia)			Pts
Pos	Driver	R1	R2	R3	R4	R1	R2	R3	R4	R1	R2	R3	R4	R1	R2	R3	R4	R1	R2	R3	R1	R2	R3	R1	R2	R3	Pts
1	(Serbia) Andrej Petrović					3	1	2	2	1	1	3	1	1	Ret	2	3	1	4	1	2	1	4†	1	2	1	261
2	(Kyrgyzstan) Kirill Kutskov	2	3	2	4	2	3	3	1	4	Ret	4	2	3	Ret	4	1	2	2	3	1	3	1	2	1	2	252
3	(Saudi Arabia) Omar Aldereyaane	5	2	4	1	4	Ret	4	4	3	2	2	3	2	1	1	4	4	1	4	3	4	5†	3	3	3	190
4	(Kuwait) Saqer Al-Maosherji	1	4	1	2	1	2	1	3	2	3	1	4	4	Ret	3	2	3	5†	2	Ret	2	2	Ret	4	4	182
5	(Qatar) Jabor Al-Thani	6	Ret	6	Ret	WD	WD	WD	WD	6	5	6	5	6	2	5	5	5	3	5	4	5	3	4	Ret	5	113.5
6	(Philippines) Juancho Brobio					5	Ret	5	5	5	4	5	6	5	3	6	6										54.5
Trophy Event-only drivers
–	(Germany) Montego Maassen	3	1	3	3																						–
–	(Saudi Arabia) Abdulaziz Altayar	4	5	5	Ret																						–
Pos	Driver	R1	R2	R3	R4	R1	R2	R3	R4	R1	R2	R3	R4	R1	R2	R3	R4	R1	R2	R3	R1	R2	R3	R1	R2	R3	Pts
Pos	Driver	BHR (Bahrain)				KMT1 (Kuwait)				KMT2 (Kuwait)				LSL (Qatar)				JED1 (Saudi Arabia)			JED2 (Saudi Arabia)			JED3 (Saudi Arabia)			Pts
