= 2023 Eurocup-3 season =

2023 formula racing championship

The 2023 Eurocup-3 season was the inaugural season of the Eurocup-3 series. It was a multi-event motor racing championship for single-seater open wheel formula racing cars held across Europe. The championship was created as an alternative to the FIA-sanctioned Formula Regional European Championship and the Euroformula Open championship, after the latter series struggled to attract entries in late 2022.

The series aimed to provide a level playing field for all drivers, with all partaking teams agreeing on a maximum budget of €400,000 per season.

Esteban Masson, driving for Campos Racing, became the inaugural Drivers' Champion, while his team won the Teams' Championship. Bruno del Pino, driving for MP Motorsport, won the Rookies' Championship.

== Teams and drivers ==
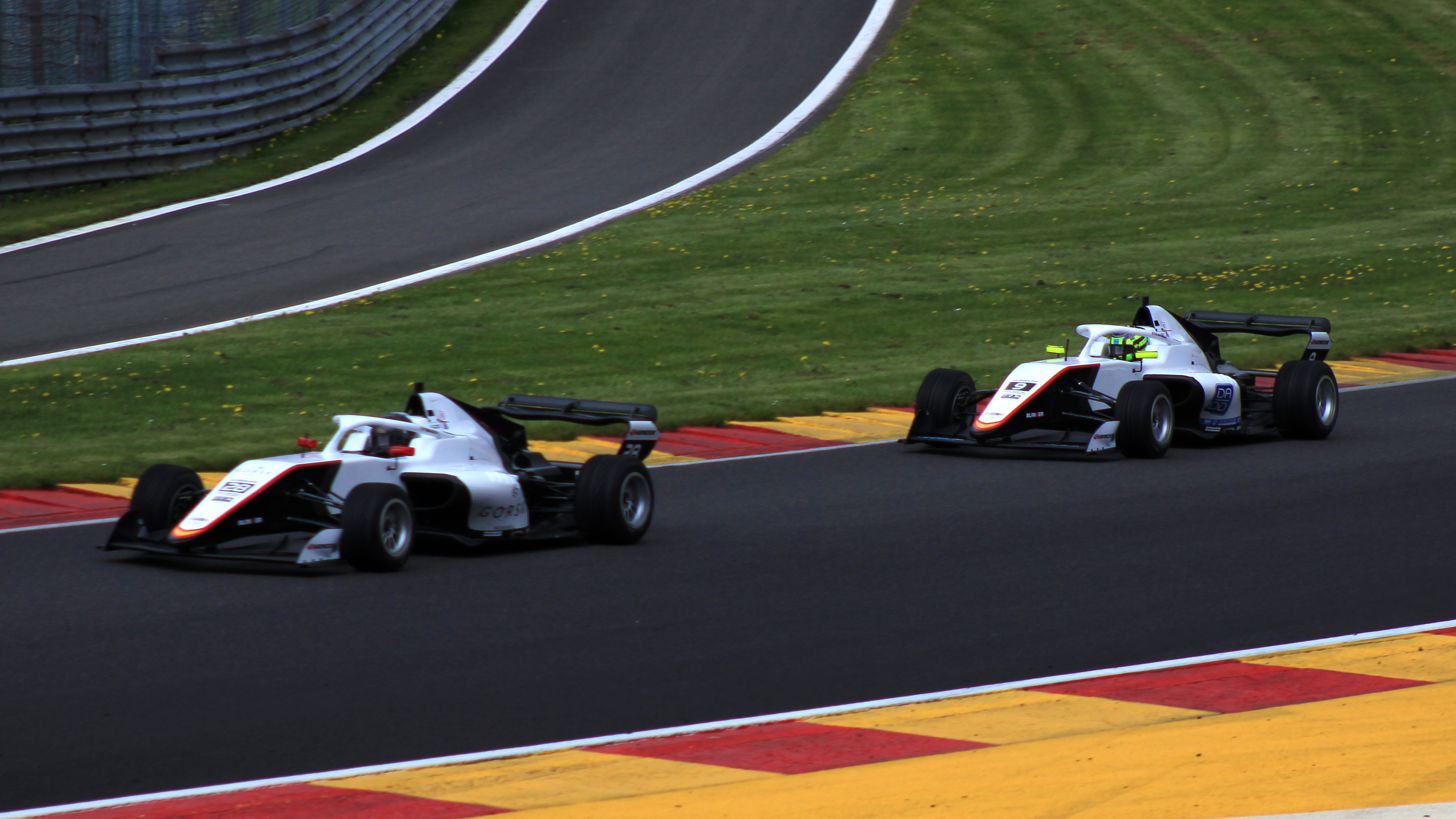
Campos Racing teammates Francesco Braschi (left) and Drivers' Champion Esteban Masson (right) driving the updated Tatuus F3 T-318 at Spa.

Teams utilized the same Tatuus F3 T-318 chassis used in the Formula Regional European Championship, but fitted with an updated body kit, a new intercooler and a battery kit. It also was 25kg lighter than the FRECA car. The car used a 1.75 L 270 hp Alfa Romeo-Autotecnica inline-4 turbocharged engine, and Hankook tires. A push-to-pass system awarding an extra 25hp was also used.

Team	No.	Driver	Status	Rounds
(Spain) Palou Motorsport	3	(Spain) Javier Sagrera		1–6
(Spain) Palou Motorsport	8	(Brazil) Emerson Fittipaldi Jr.	R	8
(Spain) Palou Motorsport	26	(Mexico) Jorge Campos	R	4–8
(Spain) Palou Motorsport	55	(Spain) Miron Pingasov (Note: Pingasov is Russian, but he competes under a Spanish licence as Russian national emblems were banned by the FIA following the Russian invasion of Ukraine.)	R	All
(Spain) Palou Motorsport	63	(Greece) Georgis Markogiannis	R	4–5, 7–8
(Spain) Palou Motorsport	73	(United Kingdom) Cian Shields		1
(Spain) GRS Team	5	(United Kingdom) Daniel Mavlyutov (Note: Mavlyutov is a Turkish-Russian racing driver competing under a British licence.)	R (Note: Mavlyutov was only considered a rookie in round 4.)	4, 6, 8
(Spain) GRS Team	7	(Brazil) Emerson Fittipaldi Jr.	R	6
(Spain) GRS Team	11	(Thailand) Carl Bennett	R (Note: Bennett was not considered a rookie in round 8.)	7–8
(Spain) GRS Team	12	(Bulgaria) Nikola Tsolov		5, 7–8
(Spain) GRS Team	18	(China) Cenyu Han		1–3
(Spain) GRS Team	33	(Mexico) Jesse Carrasquedo Jr.	R	4
(Spain) GRS Team	60	(Netherlands) Niels Koolen		6
(Spain) GRS Team	68	(Netherlands) Niels Koolen		5
(Netherlands) MP Motorsport	6	(Spain) Bruno del Pino	R	All
(Netherlands) MP Motorsport	24	(Spain) Mari Boya		All
(Netherlands) MP Motorsport	25	(Denmark) Sebastian Øgaard		All
(Netherlands) MP Motorsport	35	(Denmark) Sebastian Gravlund	R	All
(Netherlands) MP Motorsport	99	(Mexico) José Garfias		All
(Spain) Drivex	7	(Kyrgyzstan) Georgy Zhuravskiy	R	7–8
(Spain) Drivex	13	(Spain) Daniel Nogales	R (Note: Nogales was not considered a rookie in round 7.)	3–8
(Spain) Drivex	44	(Sweden) William Karlsson	R	1–3
(Spain) Drivex	54	(France) Pierre-Louis Chovet		1
(Spain) Drivex	64	(Canada) Nick Gilkes		All
(Spain) Drivex	77	(United States) David Morales		4
(Spain) Campos Racing	9	(France) Esteban Masson		All
(Spain) Campos Racing	14	(Thailand) Tasanapol Inthraphuvasak		All
(Spain) Campos Racing	28	(Italy) Francesco Braschi		All
(Spain) Campos Racing	52	(Morocco) Suleiman Zanfari	R	All
(France) Saintéloc Racing	34	(Switzerland) Dario Cabanelas	R	5–8

Icon	Legend
R	Rookie

- Jorge Campos was scheduled to compete for Campos Racing, but later switched to Palou Motorsport.

== Race calendar ==
Eight destinations were announced when the series was revealed, with every round consisting of two practice sessions, two qualifyings and two races. This calendar was finalized on 23 December 2022. As the series shared its promoter with the F4 Spanish Championship, six of the eight rounds were held together with that series.

Round		Circuit	Date	Support bill	Map of circuit locations
1	R1	(Belgium) Circuit de Spa-Francorchamps, Stavelot	5 May	24H GT Series (12 Hours of Spa-Francorchamps); 24H TCE Series (12 Hours of Spa-Francorchamps)	2023 Eurocup-3 season is located in Europe
1	R2	(Belgium) Circuit de Spa-Francorchamps, Stavelot	6 May	24H GT Series (12 Hours of Spa-Francorchamps); 24H TCE Series (12 Hours of Spa-Francorchamps)	2023 Eurocup-3 season is located in Europe
2	R1	(Spain) MotorLand Aragón, Alcañiz	27 May	F4 Spanish Championship; Porsche Sprint Challenge Iberica	2023 Eurocup-3 season is located in Europe
2	R2	(Spain) MotorLand Aragón, Alcañiz	28 May	F4 Spanish Championship; Porsche Sprint Challenge Iberica	2023 Eurocup-3 season is located in Europe
3	R1	(Italy) Autodromo Nazionale di Monza, Monza	10 June	24H GT Series (12 Hours of Monza); 24H TCE Series (12 Hours of Monza)	2023 Eurocup-3 season is located in Europe
3	R2	(Italy) Autodromo Nazionale di Monza, Monza	11 June	24H GT Series (12 Hours of Monza); 24H TCE Series (12 Hours of Monza)	2023 Eurocup-3 season is located in Europe
4	R1	(Netherlands) Circuit Zandvoort, Zandvoort	16 July	Zandvoort Summer Trophy; Marcel Albers Memorial Trophy	2023 Eurocup-3 season is located in Europe
4	R2	(Netherlands) Circuit Zandvoort, Zandvoort	16 July	Zandvoort Summer Trophy; Marcel Albers Memorial Trophy	2023 Eurocup-3 season is located in Europe
5	R1	(Spain) Circuito de Jerez, Jerez de la Frontera	23 September	F4 Spanish Championship; Porsche Sprint Challenge Iberica	2023 Eurocup-3 season is located in Europe
5	R2	(Spain) Circuito de Jerez, Jerez de la Frontera	24 September	F4 Spanish Championship; Porsche Sprint Challenge Iberica	2023 Eurocup-3 season is located in Europe
6	R1	(Portugal) Circuito do Estoril, Estoril	30 September	TCR Spain Touring Car Championship; F4 Spanish Championship	2023 Eurocup-3 season is located in Europe
6	R2	(Portugal) Circuito do Estoril, Estoril	1 October	TCR Spain Touring Car Championship; F4 Spanish Championship	2023 Eurocup-3 season is located in Europe
7	R1	(Spain) Circuit Ricardo Tormo, Cheste	14 October	F4 Spanish Championship; Porsche Sprint Challenge Iberica	2023 Eurocup-3 season is located in Europe
7	R2	(Spain) Circuit Ricardo Tormo, Cheste	15 October	F4 Spanish Championship; Porsche Sprint Challenge Iberica	2023 Eurocup-3 season is located in Europe
8	R1	(Spain) Circuit de Barcelona-Catalunya, Montmeló	11 November	F4 Spanish Championship; Renault Clio Cup	2023 Eurocup-3 season is located in Europe
8	R2	(Spain) Circuit de Barcelona-Catalunya, Montmeló	12 November	F4 Spanish Championship; Renault Clio Cup	2023 Eurocup-3 season is located in Europe

== Race results ==
Round		Circuit	Pole position	Fastest lap	Winning driver	Winning team	Rookie winner
1	R1	(Belgium) Circuit de Spa-Francorchamps	(Spain) Mari Boya	(Italy) Francesco Braschi	(Italy) Francesco Braschi	(Spain) Campos Racing	(Morocco) Suleiman Zanfari
1	R2	(Belgium) Circuit de Spa-Francorchamps	(Spain) Mari Boya	(Spain) Mari Boya	(Spain) Mari Boya	(Netherlands) MP Motorsport	(Spain) Miron Pingasov
2	R1	(Spain) MotorLand Aragón	(Thailand) Tasanapol Inthraphuvasak	(France) Esteban Masson	(France) Esteban Masson	(Spain) Campos Racing	(Spain) Bruno del Pino
2	R2	(Spain) MotorLand Aragón	(France) Esteban Masson	(France) Esteban Masson	(France) Esteban Masson	(Spain) Campos Racing	(Morocco) Suleiman Zanfari
3	R1	(Italy) Autodromo Nazionale di Monza	(Spain) Mari Boya	(Denmark) Sebastian Øgaard	(Spain) Mari Boya	(Netherlands) MP Motorsport	(Spain) Daniel Nogales
3	R2	(Italy) Autodromo Nazionale di Monza	(Italy) Francesco Braschi	(Denmark) Sebastian Øgaard	(Spain) Mari Boya	(Netherlands) MP Motorsport	(Spain) Bruno del Pino
4	R1	(Netherlands) Circuit Zandvoort	(France) Esteban Masson	(France) Esteban Masson	(France) Esteban Masson	(Spain) Campos Racing	(Spain) Bruno del Pino
4	R2	(Netherlands) Circuit Zandvoort	(Spain) Mari Boya	(Spain) Mari Boya	(France) Esteban Masson	(Spain) Campos Racing	(Spain) Bruno del Pino
5	R1	(Spain) Circuito de Jerez	(Bulgaria) Nikola Tsolov	(Bulgaria) Nikola Tsolov	(Italy) Francesco Braschi	(Spain) Campos Racing	(Spain) Daniel Nogales
5	R2	(Spain) Circuito de Jerez	(Bulgaria) Nikola Tsolov	(Bulgaria) Nikola Tsolov	(Denmark) Sebastian Øgaard	(Netherlands) MP Motorsport	(Spain) Bruno del Pino
6	R1	(Portugal) Circuito do Estoril	(France) Esteban Masson	(France) Esteban Masson	(France) Esteban Masson	(Spain) Campos Racing	(Spain) Miron Pingasov
6	R2	(Portugal) Circuito do Estoril	(Thailand) Tasanapol Inthraphuvasak	(Spain) Mari Boya	(Spain) Mari Boya	(Netherlands) MP Motorsport	(Spain) Bruno del Pino
7	R1	(Spain) Circuit Ricardo Tormo	(France) Esteban Masson	(France) Esteban Masson	(France) Esteban Masson	(Spain) Campos Racing	(Spain) Bruno del Pino
7	R2	(Spain) Circuit Ricardo Tormo	(Spain) Mari Boya	(Spain) Mari Boya	(Spain) Mari Boya	(Netherlands) MP Motorsport	(Spain) Bruno del Pino
8	R1	(Spain) Circuit de Barcelona-Catalunya	(France) Esteban Masson	(France) Esteban Masson	(France) Esteban Masson	(Spain) Campos Racing	(Spain) Bruno del Pino
8	R2	(Spain) Circuit de Barcelona-Catalunya	(France) Esteban Masson	(France) Esteban Masson	(France) Esteban Masson	(Spain) Campos Racing	(Spain) Bruno del Pino

== Season report ==
=== First half ===
16 cars entered the inaugural round of the newly formed Eurocup-3 at Spa. The new series was greeted with wet weather, and MP's Mari Boya coped best to take two pole positions. The first race started on a damp track with the field on dry tyres. This saw some drivers really struggle, with others benefitting: Campos's Francesco Braschi rose from eighth to the lead in two laps and never looked back from there, while GRS's Cenyu Han and Campos's Suleiman Zanfari followed through behind him. The second race was more straightforward: Boya lost the lead to Palou's Javier Sagrera, but kept close to his compatriot to reclaim first place seven minutes before the end of the race. Braschi was then also able to get past Sagrera on the final lap to take second place, and with it the championship lead. Boya's win earned him second in the standings, four points behind.

Boya withdrew from the second round at MotorLand Aragón due to a clashing F3 commitment. Campos's Tasanapol Inthraphuvasak took pole position for the first race, and kept it ahead of his teammate Esteban Masson and MP's Sebastian Øgaard, but his car suffered a mechanical issue that forced him to retire. Braschi was victorious in a battle for fourth that would then become third when the leader dropped out of the race. Masson continued his strong pace to take pole position for the second race. Braschi jumped MP's Bruno del Pino at the start to take second. The latter kept in contention, but a late safety car restart and the ensuing battle saw him go off. This elevated his teammate José Garfias onto the podium. Another double podium saw Braschi extend his points lead, while Masson's double win elevated him to second, ten points in the rear.

The third round at Monza saw the returning Boya and leader Braschi share pole positions. The first half of the first race was filled with battles for the podium, but Boya was able to repel multiple attacks on his first place. Sagrera and Braschi both challenged him, but made mistakes and dropped back. In the end, Boya won ahead of Øgaard, while Masson came third. Braschi and Boya started race two alongside each other and fought throughout the first lap. This brought Masson into play and he took two laps to overtake both, with Boya then dropping to sixth. Sagrera was the next to take the lead on lap 11. By then, Boya was also back in contention, and he retook first on lap 14. He held on to take a second win, with Sagrera in second and Masson third. Braschi had another difficult race and dropped to third in the standings, with Masson the new leader, four points from Boya.

Zandvoort was up next, and Masson was on pole position for the first race. Tricky wet conditions saw six drivers slide off into turn one. Masson was among them, dropping down the order and handing the lead to MP's Bruno del Pino. Masson climbed back up the order and was in third when a safety car was called. He took second at the restart and the lead two laps later to win ahead of Øgaard and Inthraphuvasak. Boya could only manage tenth, but bounced back a day later with race two pole position. That was short-lived, however, as Masson immediately took the lead at the start of the race. Boya kept close to him, but could not mount an attack, before the race was ended early when Palou's Jorge Campos crashed. Øgaard came third, closing up to nine points behind Boya in the standings. Masson's double-win handed him a 35-point cushion.

=== Second half ===
The second half of the season began at Circuito de Jerez with GRS's debutant Nikola Tsolov taking pole position. He had a slow start for the first race, though, allowing Braschi into the lead and dropping down to fourth. Championship leader Masson was second until he made an error and crashed his car. This promoted Sagrera into second, but Tsolov was hot on his tail and took the place in the final part of the race. He continued his strong form to also take pole position for the second race, but was once again unable to nail his start. This time, Øgaard was the one to benefit and take first place. The pair held position through multiple safety car interruptions, while Inthraphuvasak climbed to third behind them. Masson was spun around into retirement by Garfias. His second non-finish coupled with Øgaard's win saw his lead reduced to seven points, with Boya now third.

At Estoril, Masson was determined to regrow his lead and took pole position for the first race. He had a controlled, trouble-free race to take his fifth win of the season. Braschi came second after a similarly calm race. Third place was hotly contested between Boya and Øgaard, with the Spaniard eventually taking the place on lap eleven. Inthraphuvasak took pole position for the second race, but Masson and Boya behind him had better starts and both overtook him. Masson held the lead, but weaved too much on a safety car restart and was hit with a drive-through penalty. This dropped him out of the points and left Boya to head an MP Motorsport 1-2-3 ahead of Øgaard and Garfias. The championship tightened up once again, with Masson now only five points clear of Øgaard and Boya only a single point further behind.

The penultimate round of the season at Circuit Ricardo Tormo once again began with Masson taking pole position for race one. Garfias in second was no match for him as he streaked away to take another lights-to-flag victory, with the Mexican having to fend off Boya. The Spaniard had considerably more pace all throughout the race but was unable to get past into second. Boya started the second race from first place and managed his gap to Øgaard, who himself had no pressure coming from Garfias in third. Del Pino in fourth completed a MP 1-2-3-4, with championship leader Masson in fifth not managing to get by. His win saw Boya jump Øgaard in the standings, with him and Masson only separated by a single point going into the season finale.

The championship decider at Circuit de Barcelona-Catalunya started with Masson dealing the first blow by taking pole position for race one. He completely dominated the race ahead of Inthraphuvasak, while Boya had to fight his way through the race. Garfias in third posed a challenge: the pair collided, Garfias retired but Boya was unharmed and took third place. Masson continued his crushing pace through the second day. He took another pole position and continued on to take another controlled victory to become the inaugural Eurocup-3 champion. Inthraphuvasak ended his campaign with another second place, while Garfias had to fight off Drivex's Nick Gilkes for third before the latter made a mistake. Boya finished fourth, 30 points behind Masson after he could not compete with the Frenchman's pace over the weekend.

The inaugural Eurocup-3 championship had its entry numbers drop below 15 only once, with the season finale attracting 20 cars – a large number for a debuting championship that showed prevailing interest for an alternative to the all-conquering Formula Regional European Championship. Masson, Boya and Øgaard produced a competitive battle for the championship, albeit largely controlled by Masson. His mistakes, like in Jerez and Estoril, made the title fight as close as it was, but when it came down to the last race, the rest of the field was no match for him.

== Championship standings ==
=== Scoring system ===
Points were awarded to the top ten classified finishers. Additional points were awarded for setting the fastest lap during a race or qualifying on pole position.

Position	**1st**	**2nd**	**3rd**	**4th**	**5th**	**6th**	**7th**	**8th**	**9th**	**10th**	**Pole**	**FL**
Points	25	18	15	12	10	8	6	4	2	1	2	1

=== Drivers' standings ===
Pos	Driver	SPA (Belgium)		ARA (Spain)		MNZ (Italy)		ZAN (Netherlands)		JER (Spain)		EST (Portugal)		CRT (Spain)		CAT (Spain)		Pts
Pos	Driver	R1	R2	R1	R2	R1	R2	R1	R2	R1	R2	R1	R2	R1	R2	R1	R2	Pts
1	(France) Esteban Masson	6	7	1	**1**	3	3	**1**	1	Ret	Ret	**1**	14	**1**	5	**1**	**1**	273
2	(Spain) Mari Boya	**4**	**1**	WD	WD	**1**	1	10	**2**	8	4	3	1	3	**1**	3	4	243
3	(Denmark) Sebastian Øgaard	5	8	2	4	2	5	2	3	4	1	4	2	5	2	4	6	222
4	(Mexico) José Garfias	Ret	6	4	3	6	4	6	6	5	6	6	3	2	3	18†	3	160
5	(Italy) Francesco Braschi	1	2	3	2	11	**8**	Ret	7	1	Ret	2	7	12	7	5	9	156
6	(Thailand) Tasanapol Inthraphuvasak	10	5	**Ret**	DNS	5	7	3	4	Ret	3	10	**4**	4	6	2	2	142
7	(Spain) Bruno del Pino	8	Ret	5	7	14	6	4	5	10	5	8	5	6	4	6	5	113
8	(Spain) Javier Sagrera	13	3	10†	Ret	4	2	5	8	3	7	13	6					89
9	(Morocco) Suleiman Zanfari	3	11	7	5	12	13	7	11	DNS	12	12	12	7	Ret	9	Ret	45
10	(Bulgaria) Nikola Tsolov									**2**	**2**			9	Ret	WD	WD	44
11	(Canada) Nick Gilkes	7	9	Ret	6	10	14	Ret	13	11	9	5	8	Ret	11	11	8	37
12	(Spain) Daniel Nogales					7	9	9	9	6	8	11	13	10	10	8	7	36
13	(Denmark) Sebastian Gravlund	12	12	6	Ret	NC	Ret	8	DNS	7	13	17	9	8	8	12	11	28
14	(Spain) Miron Pingasov	Ret	10	9	8	8	11	14	10	9	Ret	7	16	Ret	9	7	Ret	28
15	(China) Cenyu Han	2	13	WD	WD	9	10											21
16	(France) Pierre-Louis Chovet	9	4															14
17	(Sweden) William Karlsson	11	14	8	9	13	12											6
18	(Switzerland) Dario Cabanelas									13	10	9	10	13	Ret	13	10	5
19	(Brazil) Emerson Fittipaldi Jr.											14	11			10	Ret	1
20	(Greece) Georgis Markogiannis							12	16	Ret	11			11	Ret	15	13	0
21	(United States) David Morales							11	15									0
22	(Mexico) Jesse Carrasquedo Jr.							15	12									0
23	(Thailand) Carl Bennett													16	12	17	Ret	0
24	(Kyrgyzstan) Georgy Zhuravskiy													14	13	16	12	0
25	(Netherlands) Niels Koolen									12	Ret	WD	WD					0
26	(United Kingdom) Daniel Mavlyutov							13	14			15	15			Ret	15	0
27	(Mexico) Jorge Campos							16†	17†	Ret	14	16	Ret	15	14	14	14	0
—	(United Kingdom) Cian Shields	DNS	DNS															—
Pos	Driver	R1	R2	R1	R2	R1	R2	R1	R2	R1	R2	R1	R2	R1	R2	R1	R2	Pts
Pos	Driver	SPA (Belgium)		ARA (Spain)		MNZ (Italy)		ZAN (Netherlands)		JER (Spain)		EST (Portugal)		CRT (Spain)		CAT (Spain)		Pts

Colour	Result
Gold	Winner
Silver	Second place
Bronze	Third place
Green	Points classification
Blue	Non-points classification
Blue	Non-classified finish (NC)
Purple	Retired, not classified (Ret)
Red	Did not qualify (DNQ)
Red	Did not pre-qualify (DNPQ)
Black	Disqualified (DSQ)
White	Did not start (DNS)
White	Withdrew (WD)
White	Race cancelled (C)
Blank	Did not practice (DNP)
Blank	Did not arrive (DNA)
Blank	Excluded (EX)

**Bold** – Pole
Italics – Fastest Lap
† — Did not finish but classified

=== Rookie standings ===
Pos	Driver	SPA (Belgium)		ARA (Spain)		MNZ (Italy)		ZAN (Netherlands)		JER (Spain)		EST (Portugal)		CRT (Spain)		CAT (Spain)		Pts
Pos	Driver	R1	R2	R1	R2	R1	R2	R1	R2	R1	R2	R1	R2	R1	R2	R1	R2	Pts
1	(Spain) Bruno del Pino	8	Ret	5	7	14	6	4	5	10	5	8	5	6	4	6	5	326
2	(Morocco) Suleiman Zanfari	3	11	7	5	12	14	7	11	DNS	12	11	12	7	Ret	9	Ret	200
3	(Spain) Miron Pingasov	Ret	10	9	8	8	11	14	10	9	Ret	7	16	Ret	9	8	Ret	184
4	(Denmark) Sebastian Gravlund	12	12	6	Ret	NC	Ret	8	DNS	8	13	17	9	8	8	12	11	174
5	(Spain) Daniel Nogales					7	9	9	9	6	8	12	13			9	7	167
6	(Switzerland) Dario Cabanelas									13	10	9	10	13	Ret	13	10	86
7	(Sweden) William Karlsson	11	14	8	9	13	12											75
8	(Greece) Georgis Markogiannis							12	16	Ret	11			11	Ret	15	13	50
9	(Mexico) Jorge Campos							16†	17†	Ret	14	16	Ret	14	14	14	14	44
10	(Brazil) Emerson Fittipaldi Jr.											14	11			10	Ret	30
11	(Kyrgyzstan) Georgy Zhuravskiy													15	13	17	12	29
12	(Thailand) Carl Bennett													16	12			16
13	(Mexico) Jesse Carrasquedo Jr.							15	12									11
14	(United Kingdom) Daniel Mavlyutov							13	14									6
Pos	Driver	R1	R2	R1	R2	R1	R2	R1	R2	R1	R2	R1	R2	R1	R2	R1	R2	Pts
Pos	Driver	SPA (Belgium)		ARA (Spain)		MNZ (Italy)		ZAN (Netherlands)		JER (Spain)		EST (Portugal)		CRT (Spain)		CAT (Spain)		Pts

=== Teams' standings ===
Each team counted their two best results per race.

Pos	Driver	SPA (Belgium)		ARA (Spain)		MNZ (Italy)		ZAN (Netherlands)		JER (Spain)		EST (Portugal)		CRT (Spain)		CAT (Spain)		Pts
Pos	Driver	R1	R2	R1	R2	R1	R2	R1	R2	R1	R2	R1	R2	R1	R2	R1	R2	Pts
1	(Spain) Campos Racing	1	2	1	1	3	3	1	1	1	3	1	4	1	5	1	1	516
1	(Spain) Campos Racing	3	5	3	2	5	7	3	4	Ret	12	2	7	4	6	2	2	516
2	(Netherlands) MP Motorsport	4	1	2	3	1	1	2	2	4	1	3	1	2	1	3	3	514
2	(Netherlands) MP Motorsport	5	6	4	4	2	4	4	3	5	4	4	2	3	2	4	4	514
3	(Spain) Palou Motorsport	13	3	8	9	4	2	5	8	3	7	7	6	11	9	7	13	118
3	(Spain) Palou Motorsport	Ret	10	10†	Ret	8	11	12	10	9	12	13	16	15	14	10	14	118
4	(Spain) Drivex	7	4	9	6	7	9	9	9	6	8	5	8	10	10	9	7	93
4	(Spain) Drivex	9	9	Ret	8	10	12	11	13	11	9	12	13	14	11	11	8	93
5	(Spain) GRS Team	2	13	WD	WD	9	10	13	12	2	2	14	11	9	12	17	15	60
5	(Spain) GRS Team							15	14	12	Ret	15	15	16	Ret	Ret	Ret	60
6	(France) Saintéloc Racing									13	10	9	10	13	Ret	13	10	5
Pos	Driver	R1	R2	R1	R2	R1	R2	R1	R2	R1	R2	R1	R2	R1	R2	R1	R2	Pts
Pos	Driver	SPA (Belgium)		ARA (Spain)		MNZ (Italy)		ZAN (Netherlands)		JER (Spain)		EST (Portugal)		CRT (Spain)		CAT (Spain)		Pts
