= Montego Maassen =

German racing driver (born 2007)

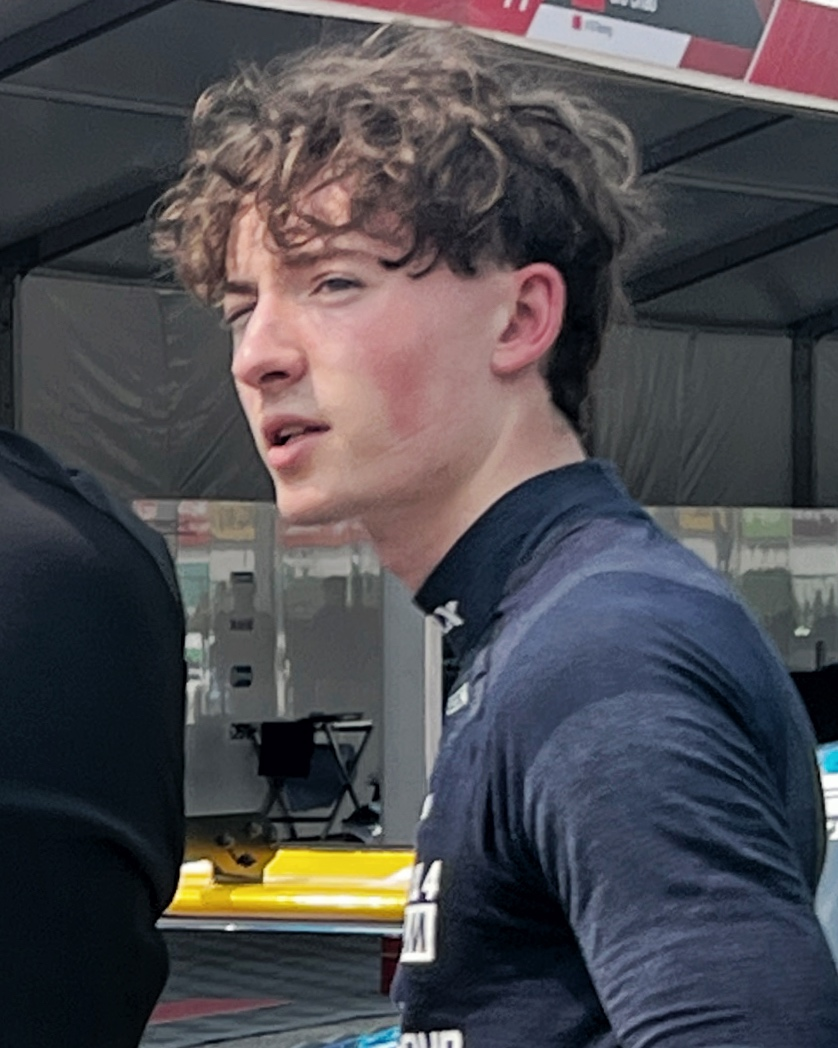
- Maassen at the 2026 Porsche Carrera Cup Asia Shanghai round
- Nationality: (Germany) German
- Born: 9 November 2007 (age 18) Hofheim am Taunus, Germany
- Relatives: Sascha Maassen (father)

Montego Maassen (born 9 November 2007) is a German racing driver who last competed in Porsche Carrera Cup Germany for Forch Racing by Atlas Ward.

== Career ==
Maassen began karting in 2019, competing until 2023. During his karting career, Maassen most notably finished runner-up in the Mini and Senior classes of Rotax Max Challenge Germany in 2020 and 2023, respectively. In late 2023, Maassen made his single-seater debut by competing in the Trophy Event of the 2024 F4 Saudi Arabian Championship in Bahrain.

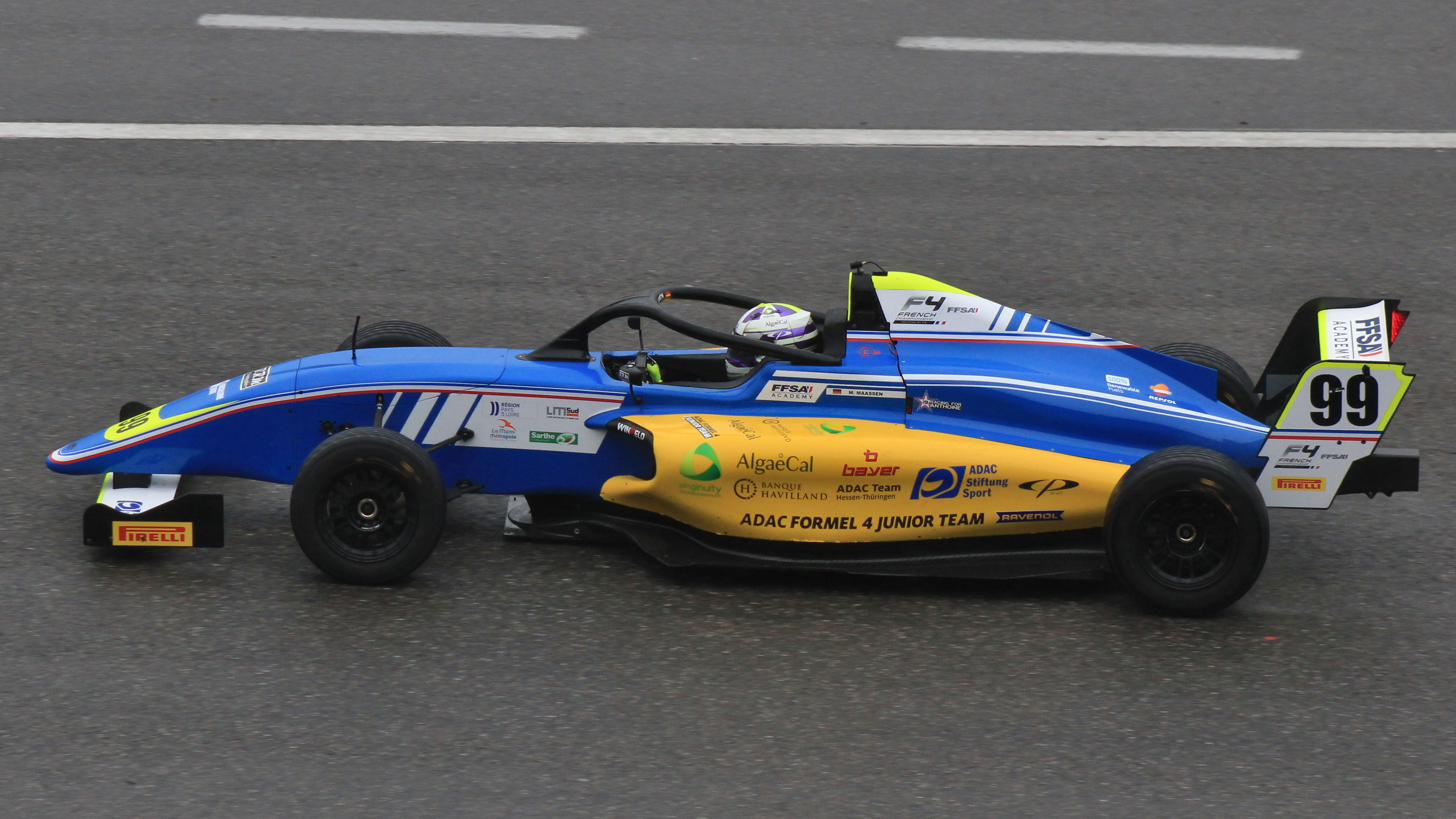
Maassen in 2024

Moving to single-seaters on a full-time basis in 2024, Maassen joined the FFSA Academy-centrally run French F4 Championship as one of two drivers part of the ADAC Formula 4 Junior Team. Starting off the season with an eighth-place finish in race three at Nogaro, Maassen didn't score points until four rounds later at Magny-Cours, in which he finished fifth and fourth in races one and three, respectively. Maassen then scored his maiden podiums the following round at Dijon by finishing second in race two and third in race three, before ending the year with a third-place finish in race two at Le Castellet to finish the season eighth in points.

The following year, Maassen remained in the French F4 Championship as part of the ADAC Formula 4 Junior Team for the second consecutive year. Following a no-score round at Nogaro, Maassen scored two third-place finishes in the following round at Dijon, before finishing second in race one at Spa. In the following three rounds, Maassen scored a best result of fifth in race one at Dijon as he ended his sophomore year tenth in points. In late 2025, Maassen participated in the European Le Mans Series rookie test at Algarve, and also made a one-off appearance in the Italian GT Cup Sprint Championship at Monza for MRNC12 in the Division 2 Pro-Am class.

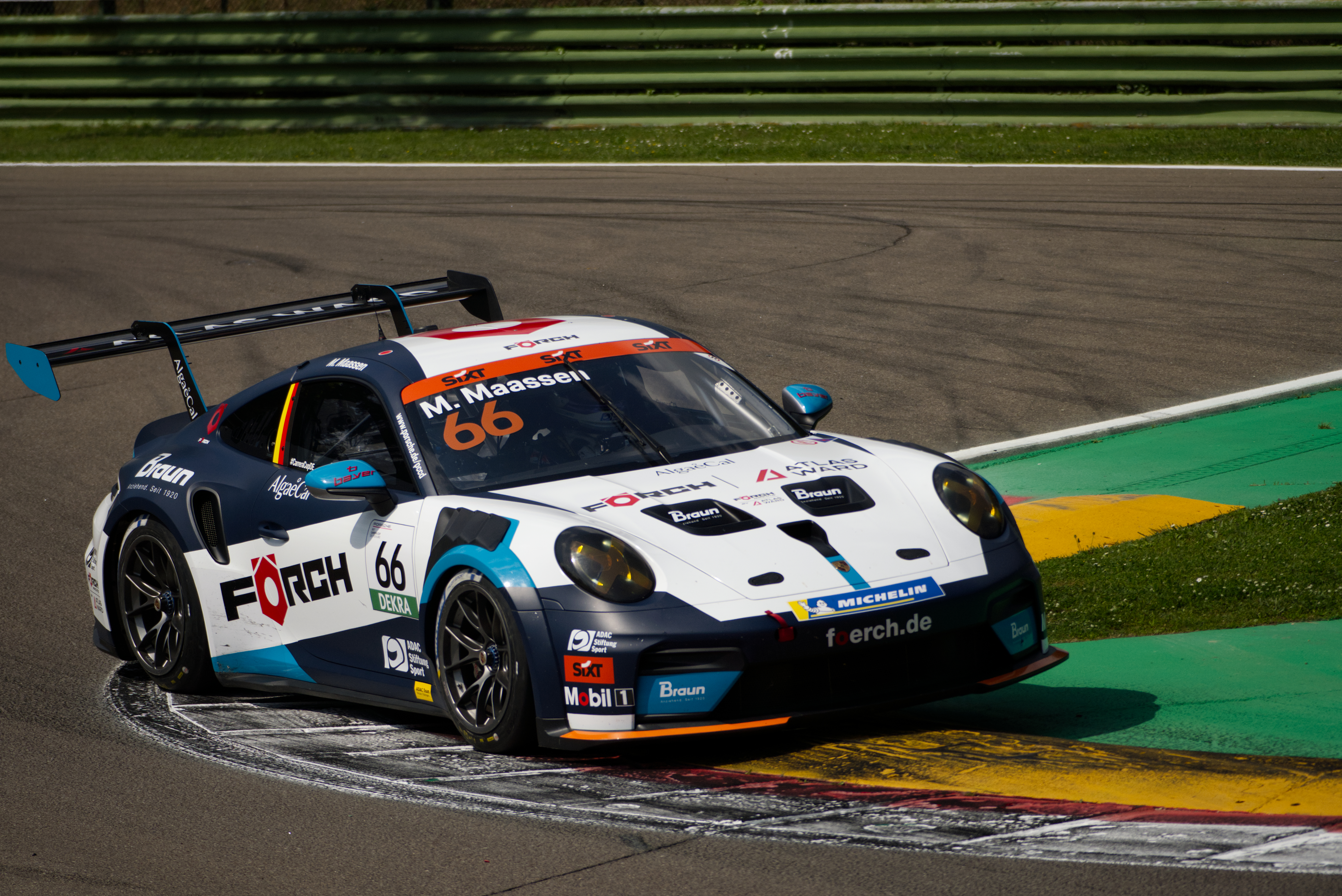
Maassen at the Imola round of the 2026 Porsche Carrera Cup Germany season.

Continuing in sportscar racing for 2026, Maassen joined Forch Racing by Atlas Ward to make his debut in Porsche Carrera Cup Germany. At the start of the year, Maassen also made select appearances in Porsche Carrera Cup Asia for Absolute Racing, in which he took a best result of fourth at Zhuhai. In his first full season in sportscar racing, Maassen took a best result of ninth at the Red Bull Ring and five other points finishes to take 21st in overall standings.

== Personal life ==
Maassen is the son of Sascha Maassen, a former Porsche factory driver and 24 Hours of Le Mans class winner.

== Karting record ==
=== Karting career summary ===
Season	Series	Team	Position
2019	Rotax Max Challenge Germany - Micro	Nees Racing	NC
2019	Rotax Max Challenge Clubsport - Micro		NC
2020	Rotax Max Challenge Germany - Mini		2nd
2021	Rotax Max Challenge Germany - Junior		8th
2021	BNL Karting Series - Rotax Max Junior		23rd
2021	Rotax Max Euro Trophy - Junior	Nees Racing	43rd
2021	Rotax MAX Euro Golden Trophy - Junior	Nees Racing	18th
2022	Rotax Max Challenge Germany - Junior		3rd
2023	Rotax Max Euro Winter Cup - Senior Max	Kraft Motorsport	27th
2023	Rotax Max Euro Trophy - Senior Max	Kraft Motorsport	19th
2023	RMC International Trophy - Senior Max	Kraft Motorsport	7th
2023	Rotax Max Challenge Germany - Senior		2nd

== Racing record ==
=== Racing career summary ===
Season	Series	Team	Races	Wins	Poles	F/Laps	Podiums	Points	Position
2023	F4 Saudi Arabian Championship – Trophy Event	Altawkilat Meritus.GP	4	0	0	0	0	—N/a	NC
2024	French F4 Championship	FFSA Academy	20	0	0	2	3	79	8th
2025	French F4 Championship	FFSA Academy	18	0	0	0	3	80	10th
2025	Italian GT Sprint Championship – GT Cup Div.2 Pro-Am	MRNC12	2	1	0	0	2	35	NC
2026	Porsche Carrera Cup Germany	Forch Racing by Atlas Ward	16	0	0	0	0	21	21st
2026	Porsche Carrera Cup Asia	Absolute Racing	4	0	0	1	0	0	NC†
2026	Nürburgring Langstrecken-Serie – SP10 Pro-Am	Car Collection Motorsport	1	0	0	0	0	4	NC

=== Complete French F4 Championship results ===
(key) (Races in bold indicate pole position; races in italics indicate fastest lap)

Year	1	2	3	4	5	6	7	8	9	10	11	12	13	14	15	16	17	18	19	20	21	DC	Points
2024	NOG; 1; 21	NOG; 2 C	NOG; 3; 8	LÉD; 1; 15	LÉD; 2; 11	LÉD; 3; 11	SPA; 1; 21	SPA; 2; 21	SPA; 3; 17	NÜR; 1; 16	NÜR; 2; 17	NÜR; 3; 24	MAG; 1; 5	MAG; 2 Ret	MAG; 3; 4	DIJ; 1; 7	DIJ; 2; 2	DIJ; 3; 3	LEC; 1; 9	LEC; 2; 3	LEC; 3; 7	8th	79
2025	NOG; 1; 12	NOG; 2; 12	NOG; 3 Ret	DIJ; 1; 3	DIJ; 2; 9	DIJ; 3; 3	SPA; 1; 2	SPA; 2; 6	SPA; 3 Ret	MAG; 1; 7	MAG; 2; 10	MAG; 3; 8	LÉD; 1; 5	LÉD; 2 Ret	LÉD; 3; 7	LMS; 1; 12	LMS; 2 Ret	LMS; 3; 9				10th	80

=== Complete Porsche Carrera Cup Germany results ===
(key) (Races in bold indicate pole position) (Races in italics indicate fastest lap)

Year	Team	1	2	3	4	5	6	7	8	9	10	11	12	13	14	15	16	DC	Points
2026	Forch Racing by Atlas Ward	IMO; 1; 12	IMO; 2; 13	RBR; 1; 9	RBR; 2; 29†	SPA; 1; 16	SPA; 2; 19	ZAN; 1; 21	ZAN; 2; 15	LAU; 1 Ret	LAU; 2; 18	NOR; 1; 14	NOR; 2 Ret	NÜR; 1; 14	NÜR; 2; 26	HOC; 1 Ret	HOC; 2; 23	21st	21
