= F4 Saudi Arabian Championship =

Single-Seater Racing Championship

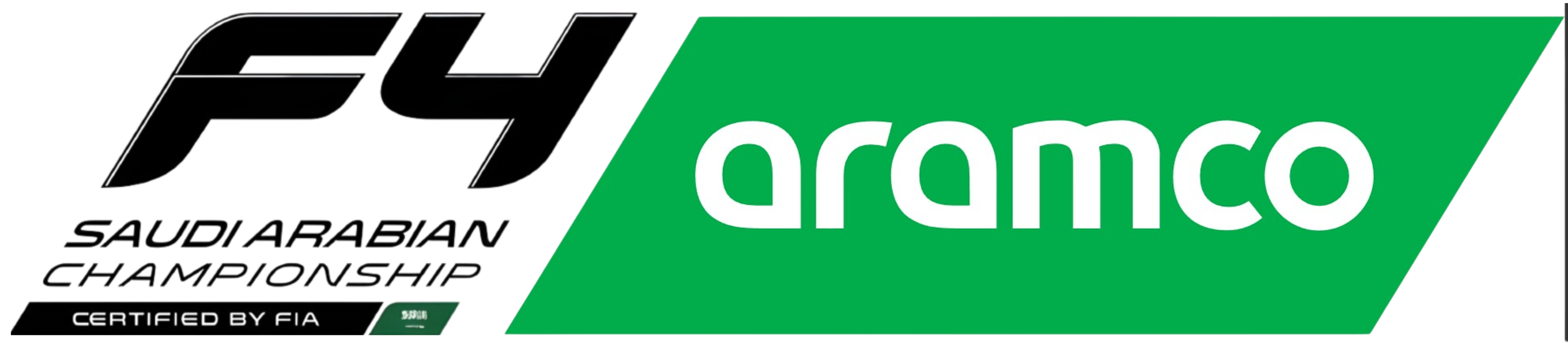
- Category: FIA Formula 4
- Country: Saudi Arabia
- Inaugural season: 2024
- Constructors: Tatuus
- Engine suppliers: Autotecnica
- Tyre suppliers: Pirelli
- Drivers' champion: (United Kingdom) Kit Belofsky
- Official website: https://f4saudiarabia.com/

The Aramco F4 Saudi Arabian Championship is a single-seater motorsport series based in Saudi Arabia. The Championship is the Kingdom’s official FIA-certified F4 series, delivered under the authority of the Saudi Automobile and Motorcycle Federation (SAMF). The series is promoted by ALTAWKILAT Motorsport.

The inaugural season was held in 2024, which was won by Federico Al Rifai.

== History ==
Gerhard Berger and the FIA Singleseater Commission launched Formula 4 in March 2013. The goal of the Formula 4 was to make the ladder to Formula 1 more transparent. Besides sporting and technical regulations, costs are also regulated.

== Format ==
All rounds run over two days, with one 40-minute testing session, one qualifying session and one race per day.

== Car ==
The cars used in this series are Tatuus F4-T421 powered by an Autotecnica engine. All cars compete under a single team, operated by Hitech Grand Prix under the Altawkilat Motorsport banner.

== Champions ==
Season	Driver	Team	Races	Poles	Wins	Podiums	Fastest lap	Points	Margins
2024	(United Arab Emirates) Federico Al Rifai	(Saudi Arabia) Altawkilat Meritus.GP	21	4	8	12	5	269.5	24.5
2025	(United Kingdom) Kit Belofsky	(Saudi Arabia) Altawkilat with Hitech	10	2	4	8	3	189	64

== Circuits ==
- **Bold** denotes a circuit is used in the 2026 season.

Number	Circuits	Rounds	Years
1	(Saudi Arabia) **Jeddah Corniche Circuit**	6 (Note: Jeddah Corniche Circuit hosted 3 rounds in 2024—2025, and it hosts 2 rounds in 2026.)	2024–present
2	**Bahrain International Circuit**	2 (Note: Bahrain International Circuit hosted 2 rounds in 2025, and it hosts 2 rounds in 2026.)	2025–present
3	Kuwait Motor Town	1	2024
3	(Qatar) **Lusail International Circuit**	1 (Note: Lusail International Circuit will host 2 rounds in 2026.)	2024
