= Juan Cota =

Spanish racing driver (born 2007)

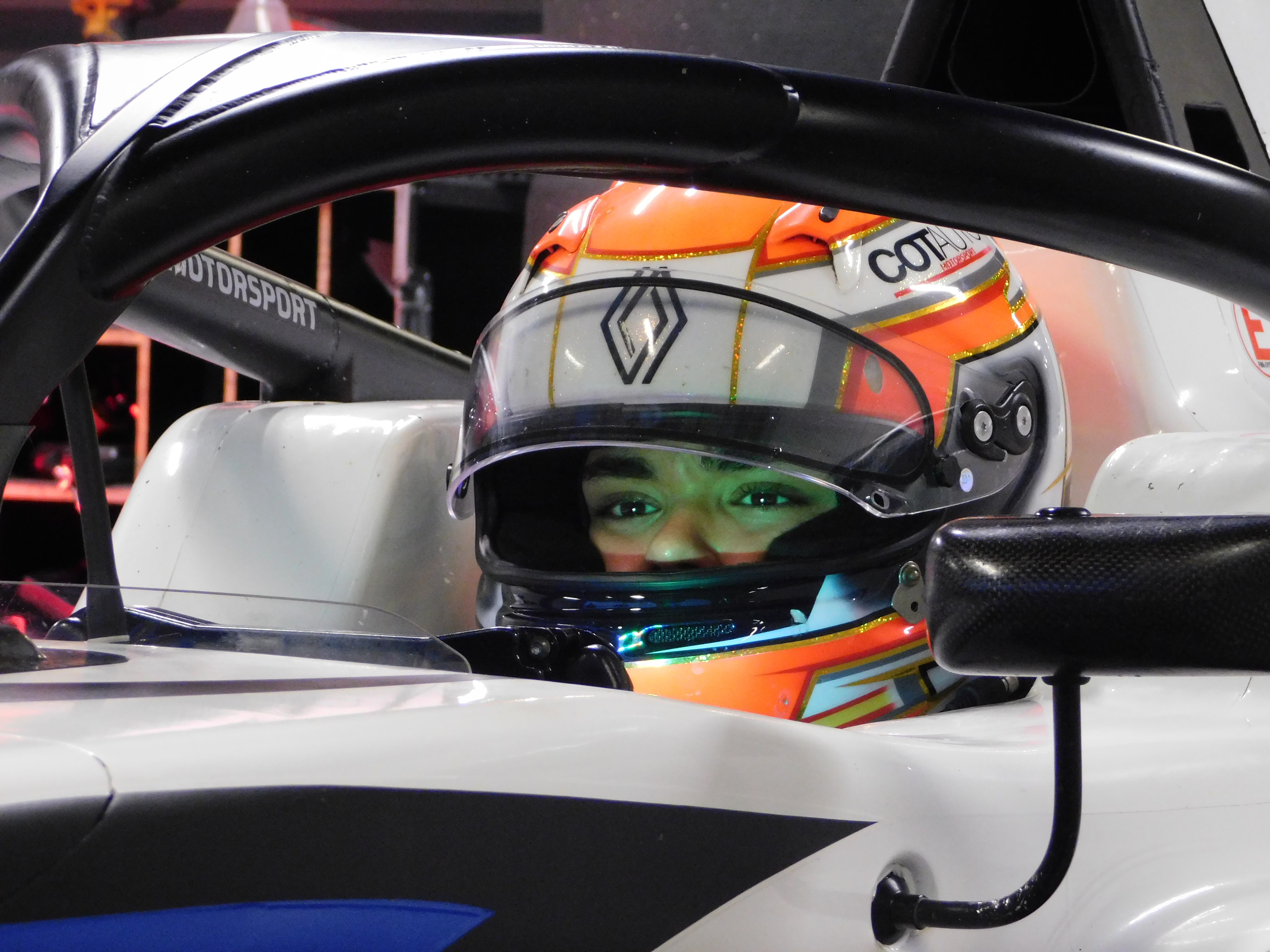
- Cota in 2025
- Nationality: (Spain) Spanish
- Born: Juan Cota Alonso; 19 September 2007 (age 19) Madrid, Spain

Eurocup-3 career
- Debut season: 2025
- Car number: 44
- Former teams: TC Racing, GRS Team
- Starts: 13
- Wins: 0
- Podiums: 0
- Poles: 0
- Fastest laps: 0
- Best finish: 19th in 2025

Previous series
- 2025 2023–2025 2023–2024: Eurocup-3 Winter; F4 Spanish; Formula Winter Series
Medal record
Formula 4
Representing Spain
FIA Motorsport Games
Gold medal – first place	2024 Valencia	F4 Cup
- Statistics up to date as of 14 November 2026.

Juan Cota Alonso (born 19 September 2007) is a Spanish racing driver who last competed in the Eurocup-3 for GRS Team.

Cota won a gold medal at the 2024 FIA Motorsport Games, representing Spain. He is a race winner in Spanish F4, finishing fourth in 2024.

== Career ==
=== Formula 4 ===
==== 2023 ====
Cota made his debut in Formula 4 machinery in the Inaugural season of the Formula Winter Series with Drivex. He continued with Drivex for the 2023 F4 Spanish Championship. Having achieved two points finishes with a high of fifth place, he finished 15th in the standings with 14 points.

==== 2024 ====
During the pre-season, Cota partook in the 2024 Formula Winter Series with MP Motorsport. In the F4 Spanish Championship, he won his first three races in the Valencia round. At the FIA Motorsport Games, Cota competed in the Formula 4 Cup, where he won the qualifying and main race. In the season finale of the F4 Spanish Championship, he won his fourth and final race of the season. Cota finished fourth in the standings, amassing a total of 186 points in an impressive sophomore season.

==== 2025 ====
Following a strong 2024 Spanish F4, on 23 December 2024, Drivex announced that Cota would join the outfit for the 2025 Eurocup-3 season. However, Cota announced that he would instead compete in the 2025 F4 Spanish Championship with MP Motorsport, citing that he felt MP gave a better path towards Formula One for his future, as they have a team in F2, F3, and Formula Regional Championships. His 2025 would be a step backwards however, as he scored no wins, four podiums throughout the year, and finished the season sixth in the standings.

=== Eurocup-3 ===
==== 2025 ====
On 23 December 2024, Drivex announced that Cota would join the outfit for the 2025 Eurocup-3 season, later being announced to race in only two rounds instead. He competed the first two rounds of winter series with the team.

== Karting record ==
=== Karting career summary ===
Season	Series	Team	Position
2018	IAME Winter Cup - X30 Mini	Unomatricula K-Team	8th
2018	Spanish Karting Championship - Cadet		11th
2019	IAME Winter Cup - X30 Mini	Kart Republic Spain	4th
2019	IAME Euro Series - X30 Mini	Kart Republic Spain	20th
2019	Spanish Karting Championship - Cadet		2nd
2020	IAME Winter Cup - X30 Junior	Kart Republic Spain	21st
2022	IAME Winter Cup - X30 Senior	KR Motorsport	34th
2022	Spanish Karting Championship - Senior	Kart Republic Motorsport	5th

== Racing record ==
=== Racing career summary ===
Season	Series	Team	Races	Wins	Poles	F/Laps	Podiums	Points	Position
2023	Formula Winter Series	Drivex	4	0	0	0	0	36	8th
2023	F4 Spanish Championship	Drivex	21	0	0	0	0	14	15th
2024	Formula Winter Series	Drivex	9	1	1	0	2	64	6th
2024	F4 Spanish Championship	Drivex	21	4	1	4	8	186	4th
2024	FIA Motorsport Games Formula 4 Cup	Team Spain	2	2	1	0	2	N/A	**1st**
2025	Eurocup-3 Spanish Winter Championship	Drivex	6	0	0	0	1	27	9th
2025	F4 Spanish Championship	MP Motorsport	21	0	1	1	4	125	6th
2025	Eurocup-3	KCL by MP	4	0	0	0	0	2	19th
2026	Eurocup-3	TC Racing	7	0	0	0	0	1	21st
2026	Eurocup-3	GRS Team	2	0	0	0	0	1	21st

=== Complete Formula Winter Series results ===
(key) (Races in bold indicate pole position; races in italics indicate fastest lap)

Year	Team	1	2	3	4	5	6	7	8	9	10	11	12	DC	Points	Ref
2023	Drivex	JER; 1; 5	JER; 2; 6	CRT; 1; 7	CRT; 2; 4	NAV; 1	NAV; 2	CAT; 1	CAT; 2					8th	36	
2024	Drivex	JER; 1; 10	JER; 2; 8	**JER**; **3**; 1	CRT; 1; 2	CRT; 2; 6	CRT; 3 Ret	ARA; 1; 7	ARA; 2; 21	ARA; 3 Ret	CAT; 1 WD	CAT; 2 WD	CAT; 3 WD	6th	64	

=== Complete F4 Spanish Championship results ===
(key) (Races in bold indicate pole position) (Races in italics indicate fastest lap)

Year	Team	1	2	3	4	5	6	7	8	9	10	11	12	13	14	15	16	17	18	19	20	21	DC	Points
2023	Drivex	SPA; 1; 18	SPA; 2; 18	SPA; 3; 18	ARA; 1; 24	ARA; 2; 28†	ARA; 3 Ret	NAV; 1; 13	NAV; 2; 20	NAV; 3; 16	JER; 1; 20	JER; 2; 17	JER; 3; 18	EST; 1; 16	EST; 2; 31	EST; 3; 8	CRT; 1; 25	CRT; 2; 13	CRT; 3; 13	CAT; 1; 20	CAT; 2; 23	CAT; 3; 5	15th	14
2024	Drivex	JAR; 1; 19	JAR; 2; 12	JAR; 3; 8	POR; 1; 24	POR; 2; 11	POR; 3; 32†	LEC; 1; 3	LEC; 2; 6	LEC; 3; 31	ARA; 1; 18	ARA; 2; 9	ARA; 3; 22	CRT; 1; 1	CRT; 2; 1	**CRT**; **3**; 1	JER; 1; 2	JER; 2; 4	JER; 3; 2	CAT; 1; 16	CAT; 2; 2	CAT; 3; 1	4th	186
2025	MP Motorsport	ARA; 1; 6	ARA; 2; 15	ARA; 3; 8	NAV; 1; 5	NAV; 2; 5	**NAV**; **3**; 12	POR; 1 Ret	POR; 2; 8	POR; 3; 3	LEC; 1; 15	LEC; 2; 5	LEC; 3; 6	JER; 1; 3	JER; 2; 2	JER; 3; 3	CRT; 1; 16	CRT; 2; 20	CRT; 3; 11	CAT; 1; 9	CAT; 2; 21	CAT; 3; 5	6th	125

=== Complete Eurocup-3 Spanish Winter Championship results ===
(key) (Races in bold indicate pole position) (Races in italics indicate fastest lap)

Year	Team	1	2	3	4	5	6	7	8	DC	Points	Ref
2025	Drivex	JER; 1; 5	JER; 2; 2	JER; 3; 15	POR; 1; 17	POR; 2; 8	POR; 3; 14	ARA; 1	ARA; 2	10th	27	

=== Complete Eurocup-3 results ===
(key) (Races in bold indicate pole position; races in italics indicate fastest lap)

Year	Team	1	2	3	4	5	6	7	8	9	10	11	12	13	14	15	16	17	18	19	Pos	Points
2025	KCL by MP	RBR; 1; 12	RBR; 2; 18	POR; 1	POR; SR	POR; 2	LEC; 1	LEC; SR	LEC; 2	MNZ; 1; 9	MNZ; 2; 13	ASS; 1	ASS; 2	SPA; 1	SPA; 2	JER; 1	JER; 2	CAT; 1	CAT; 2		19th	2
2026	TC Racing	LEC; 1	LEC; SR	LEC; 2	POR; 1	POR; 2	IMO; 1; 12	IMO; SR; 10	IMO; 2; 13	MNZ; 1 DNS	MNZ; 2 Ret	SIL; 1	SIL; 2	JER; 1; 18	JER; SPR; 17	JER; 2; 17	HUN; 1	HUN; 2			21st	1
2026	GRS Team																		CAT; 1; 11	CAT; 2 Ret	21st	1
