= Matteo Quintarelli =

Italian-Emirati racing driver (born 2007)

- Nationality: Italy
- Born: 13 June 2007 (age 19)

Asian Le Mans Series career
- Debut season: 2024-25
- Current team: Ultimate AF Corse
- Categorisation: FIA Silver
- Car number: 35
- Starts: 2
- Wins: 2
- Podiums: 2
- Poles: 2
- Fastest laps: 1
- Best finish: currently 1st in 2024-25
- Finished last season: 1st

Previous series
- 2023 2023 20242024: Italian F4 Championship; Euro 4 Championship; F4 Spanish Championship; Formula 4 UAE Championship

Matteo Quintarelli (born 13 June 2007) is an Italian racing driver who lives in Dubai. He last competed in the 2024–25 Asian Le Mans Series with Ultimate AF Corse in the LMP3 Category. He previously competed in Formula 4 with Sainteloc Racing in the Formula 4 UAE Championship and F4 Spanish Championship respectively.

He is not related to fellow Italian racing driver Ronnie Quintarelli.

== Career ==
=== Formula 4 ===
==== 2022 ====
Quintarelli made his racing debut in the Formula 4 UAE Trophy Round, which is on the support bill of the Formula One Grand Prix held in Abu Dhabi. He drove for the Yas Heat Racing Academy, finishing ninth and eleventh in the two races respectively.

==== 2023 ====
Quintarelli was then announced to be contesting the full 2024 Formula 4 UAE season, driving for the same team that he was with in the Trophy Round. He had a tough campaign finishing 34th in the standings with a best result of 16th. Quintarelli would then move over to Europe to drive in Italian F4 with R-ace GP. He finished 31st in the standings with a season-best result of 13th place. He also competed in one round of the Euro 4 Championship, finishing as high as 16th over three races.

==== 2024 ====
Quintarelli was then confirmed to be part of Saintéloc Racing's 2024 F4 Spanish Championship squad for the season. In preparation, he also would contest in the 2024 Formula 4 UAE Championship with the team. Quintarelli impressed, managing to score a best result of 4th at Yas Marina on his way to 13th place in the standings, showing considerable improvement. He then moved on to his main season in the F4 Spanish Championship, where he impressed on debut as he finished fourth with the fastest lap in the first round in race three at Jaramá. That fourth place would turn out to be Quintarelli's highest finish of the season, as he missed the final two rounds of the season on his way to 15th place in the standings, ahead of all his teammates.

=== Eurocup-3 ===
Quintarelli competed in the final round of the 2024 Eurocup-3 season, with a best result of 20th from the two races he contested.

=== Endurance racing ===
==== 2024 ====
Quintarelli was announced as one of the drivers competing for Ultimate AF Corse in the Asian Le Mans Series for the 2024-25 season. Quintarelli had a strong start to his endurance racing career, as he and his team took two victories from the first round at Sepang, winning races 1 and 2 in the LMP3 category at the 4 Hours of Sepang.

== Karting record ==
=== Karting career summary ===
Season	Series	Team	Position
2018-19	IAME Series UAE - X30 Cadet		17th
2019	Rotax Max Challenge Bahrain - Mini		2nd
2019-20	IAME Series UAE - X30 Mini		2nd
2020	IAME Euro Series - X30 Junior		37th
2020	IAME International Games - X30 Junior	Dan Holland Racing	24th
2020-21	IAME Series UAE - X30 Junior		2nd
2021	IAME Warriors Final - X30 Junior	GGM	NC
2021	Rotax Max Challenge UAE - Rotax Junior		3rd
2021-22	IAME Series UAE - X30 Junior		2nd
2022	IAME Euro Series - X30 Senior		87th
2022	Italian ACI Championship - X30 Senior		NC

== Racing record ==
=== Racing career summary ===
Season	Series	Team	Races	Wins	Poles	F/Laps	Podiums	Points	Position
2022	Formula 4 UAE Championship - Trophy Round	Yas Heat Racing Academy	2	0	0	0	0	N/A	NC
2023	Formula 4 UAE Championship	Yas Heat Racing Academy	15	0	0	0	0	0	34th
2023	Italian F4 Championship	R-ace GP	21	0	0	0	0	0	31st
2023	Euro 4 Championship	R-ace GP	3	0	0	0	0	0	30th
2024	Formula 4 UAE Championship	Saintéloc Racing	15	0	0	0	0	42	13rd
2024	F4 Spanish Championship	Saintéloc Racing	15	0	0	1	0	26	15th
2024	Eurocup-3	Saintéloc Racing	2	0	0	0	0	0	NC†
2024–25	Asian Le Mans Series - LMP3	Ultimate	6	2	2	0	3	92	**3rd**
2025	Le Mans Cup - LMP3	23Events Racing	7	1	1	0	1	55	7th
2025–26	Asian Le Mans Series - LMP3	23Events Racing	6	1	0	1	2	56	7th
2026	European Le Mans Series - LMP3	Team Virage	6	0	0	0	1	46	9th

* Season still in progress.
† As Quintarelli was a guest driver, he was ineligible to score points

=== Complete Formula 4 UAE Championship results ===
(key) (Races in bold indicate pole position) (Races in italics indicate fastest lap)

Year	Team	1	2	3	4	5	6	7	8	9	10	11	12	13	14	15	Pos	Points
2023	Yas Heat Racing Academy	DUB1; 1; 18	DUB1; 2; 22	DUB1; 3; 27	KMT1; 1; 24	KMT1; 2; 21	KMT1; 3; 22	KMT2; 1; 18	KMT2; 2; 25	KMT2; 3; 33	DUB2; 1; 19	DUB2; 2; 16	DUB2; 3; 20	YMC; 1; 21	YMC; 2; 18	YMC; 3; 22	34th	0
2024	Saintéloc Racing	YMC1; 1; 11	YMC1; 2; 5	YMC1; 3; 8	YMC2; 1; 7	YMC2; 2; 25	YMC2; 3; 13	DUB1; 1 Ret	DUB1; 2; 15	DUB1; 3 Ret	YMC3; 1; 8	YMC3; 2; 4	YMC3; 3; 20	DUB2; 1; 17	DUB2; 2; 14	DUB2; 3; 7	13th	42

=== Complete Italian F4 Championship results ===
(key) (Races in bold indicate pole position) (Races in italics indicate fastest lap)

Year	Team	1	2	3	4	5	6	7	8	9	10	11	12	13	14	15	16	17	18	19	20	21	22	DC	Points
2023	R-ace GP	IMO; 1	IMO; 2; 16	IMO; 3; 13	IMO; 4; 15	MIS; 1; 19	MIS; 2; 24	MIS; 3; 22	SPA; 1; 21	SPA; 2; 15	SPA; 3; 25	MNZ; 1 Ret	MNZ; 2; 23	MNZ; 3; 16	LEC; 1; 22	LEC; 2 Ret	LEC; 3; 31	MUG; 1 Ret	MUG; 2 Ret	MUG; 3; 16	VLL; 1; 19	VLL; 2 Ret	VLL; 3; 13	31st	0

=== Complete Euro 4 Championship results ===
(key) (Races in bold indicate pole position; races in italics indicate fastest lap)

Year	Team	1	2	3	4	5	6	7	8	9	DC	Points
2023	R-ace GP	MUG; 1; 16	MUG; 2; 17	MUG; 3; 19	MNZ; 1	MNZ; 2	MNZ; 3	CAT; 1	CAT; 2	CAT; 3	30th	0

=== Complete F4 Spanish Championship results ===
(key) (Races in bold indicate pole position; races in italics indicate fastest lap)

Year	Team	1	2	3	4	5	6	7	8	9	10	11	12	13	14	15	16	17	18	19	20	21	DC	Points
2024	Saintéloc Racing	JAR; 1; 32	JAR; 2; 9	JAR; 3; 4	POR; 1; 32†	POR; 2; 16	POR; 3; 25	LEC; 1; 7	LEC; 2; 15	LEC; 3; 7	ARA; 1; 22	ARA; 2 Ret	ARA; 3; 21	CRT; 1 Ret	CRT; 2; 14	CRT; 3; 17	JER; 1	JER; 2	JER; 3	CAT; 1	CAT; 2	CAT; 3	15th	26

=== Complete Eurocup-3 results ===
(key) (Races in bold indicate pole position) (Races in italics indicate fastest lap)

Year	Team	1	2	3	4	5	6	7	8	9	10	11	12	13	14	15	16	17	DC	Points
2024	Saintéloc Racing	SPA; 1	SPA; 2	RBR; 1	RBR; 2	POR; 1	POR; 2	POR; 3	LEC; 1	LEC; 2	ZAN; 1	ZAN; 2	ARA; 1	ARA; 2	JER; 1	JER; 2	CAT; 1 Ret	CAT; 2; 20	NC†	0

† As Quintarelli was a guest driver, he was ineligible to score points

=== Complete Asian Le Mans Series results ===
(key) (Races in bold indicate pole position) (Races in italics indicate fastest lap)

Year	Team	Class	Car	Engine	1	2	3	4	5	6	Pos.	Points
2024–25	Ultimate	LMP3	Ligier JS P320	Nissan VK56DE 5.6L V8	**SEP 1**; 1	**SEP 2**; 1	DUB 1; 2	DUB 2 Ret	ABU 1; 5	ABU 2; 4	3rd	92

=== Complete Le Mans Cup results ===
(key) (Races in bold indicate pole position; results in italics indicate fastest lap)

Year	Entrant	Class	Chassis	1	2	3	4	5	6	7	Rank	Points
2025	23Events Racing	LMP3	Ligier JS P325	**CAT**; 5	LEC; 9	LMS; 1; 7	LMS; 2; 1	SPA; 5	SIL; 5	ALG; 9	7th	55

* Season still in progress.

=== Complete European Le Mans Series results ===
(key) (Races in bold indicate pole position; results in italics indicate fastest lap)

Year	Entrant	Class	Chassis	Engine	1	2	3	4	5	6	Rank	Points
2026	Team Virage	LMP3	Ligier JS P325	Toyota V35A 3.5 L V6	CAT; 5	LEC; 8	IMO; 3	SPA; 5	SIL; 10	ALG; 7	9th	46

^{*} Season still in progress.
