= Lenny Ried =

German racing driver (born 2007)

- Ried at Silverstone Circuit in 2026
- Nationality: (Germany) German
- Born: 1 July 2007 (age 19) Ehingen, Germany
- Relatives: Christian Ried (father); Jonas Ried (brother)

European Le Mans Series career
- Debut season: 2026
- Current team: Racing Spirit of Léman
- Categorisation: FIA Silver
- Car number: 31
- Starts: 4
- Wins: 0
- Podiums: 0
- Poles: 0
- Fastest laps: 0

Previous series
- 2026 2025-26 2025 2024 2024: Le Mans Cup; Asian Le Mans Series; Eurocup-3; Formula Winter Series; F4 Spanish Championship
- Statistics up to date as of 27 August 2026.

Lenny Ried (born 1 July 2007) is a German racing driver from Ehingen. In 2026, he is competing in the European Le Mans Series with High Class Racing and in the Michelin Le Mans Cup with Racing Spirit of Léman, racing in the LMP3 category in both series.

== Career ==
=== Karting ===
Ried has an impressive karting résumé, especially in his native Germany. From 2017 to 2018, he competed in Bambini karting, where he secured a best championship result of second in the ADAC Kart Masters. For the next three years, he went on to compete on OK-Junior karts, where his most successful year came in 2021, finishing sixth in both the Deutsche Kart Meisterschaft and the ADAC Kart Masters. He moved up to join the OK category in 2022, and immediately found himself at home by winning the ADAC Kart Masters. Ried then competed in gearbox karting in 2023, in preparation for Formula 4.

=== Formula 4 ===
In February 2024, it was confirmed that Ried would be stepping up to cars, joining Monlau Motorsport for the Formula Winter Series. Ried contested the full season of the series, and had a tough spell in the series. He finished 38th in the standings, securing a best result of 17th. It was then announced that Ried would be continuing with Monlau for the F4 Spanish Championship. Improvement was evident in the first round, as he finished 14th in the third race of the round at the Circuito del Jarama. The third round of the season at Le Castellet saw Ried achieve his best finish of the season, as he finished 12th in the opening race of the round. At season's end, Ried found himself in 27th in the standings, finishing above all but one of his teammates.

=== Eurocup-3 ===
In early 2025, Ried was confirmed to be joining the Eurocup-3 grid with Spanish outfit Drivex. He also joined the team for the Spanish Winter Series. He finished 22nd in the standings, with a best finish of 12th in the opening race at Jerez. However, before the main season began, he switched teams to Palou Motorsport, driving under the Sparco Palou MS banner.

=== Sportscar career ===
In late 2025, Ried participated in the European Le Mans Series Rookie Test at Portimão, driving an LMP2 car for Proton Competition. He then made his competitive debut in prototype racing during the 2025–26 Asian Le Mans Series, competing for Bretton Racing in the LMP3 category at the 4 Hours of Sepang and 4 Hours of Dubai. In February 2026, during the Asian Le Mans Series finale weekend at the Yas Marina Circuit, Ried competed in the Gulf Radical Cup alongside Lucas Fluxá. The duo secured a second-place podium finish in the endurance race.

For the 2026 season, Ried committed to a dual program in the LMP3 category: competing in the European Le Mans Series with High Class Racing and the Le Mans Cup with Racing Spirit of Léman.

== Personal life ==
Ried's father is Christian Ried, who competes in the FIA World Endurance Championship. His elder brother Jonas competes in the European Le Mans Series.

== Karting record ==
=== Karting career summary ===
Season	Series	Team	Position
2017	ADAC Kart Bundesendlauf - Bambini	Solgat Motorsport	14th
2017	ADAC Kart Masters - Bambini		13th
2018	ADAC Kart Masters - Bambini		2nd
2019	WSK Super Master Series - OKJ	Solgat Motorsport	NC
2019	Andrea Margutti Trophy - OKJ	Solgat Motorsport	NC
2019	WSK Euro Series - OKJ	Solgat Motorsport	NC
2019	Deutsche Kart Meisterschaft - OKJ	Solgat Motorsport	26th
2020	ADAC Kart Masters - OKJ	Solgat Motorsport	15th
2021	Deutsche Kart Meisterschaft - OKJ	Lanari Racing Team	6th
2021	ADAC Kart Masters - OKJ	Lanari Racing Team	6th
2021	WSK Euro Series - OKJ		42nd
2022	ADAC Kart Masters - OK	Lanari Racing Team	1st
2023	WSK Super Master Series - KZ2	Lanari Racing Team	NC
2023	German Kart Championship - KZ2	Lanari Racing Team	18th
2023	CIK-FIA World Championship - KZ	Lanari Racing Team	34th

== Racing record ==
=== Racing career summary ===
Season	Series	Team	Races	Wins	Poles	F/Laps	Podiums	Points	Position
2024	Formula Winter Series	Monlau Motorsport	11	0	0	0	0	0	38th
2024	F4 Spanish Championship	Monlau Motorsport	21	0	0	0	0	0	27th
2025	Eurocup-3 Spanish Winter Championship	Drivex	8	0	0	0	0	0	22nd
2025	Eurocup-3	Sparco Palou MS	18	0	0	0	0	0	23rd
2025–26	Asian Le Mans Series - LMP3	Bretton Racing	4	0	0	0	0	20	14th
2026	European Le Mans Series - LMP3	Racing Spirit of Léman	6	0	0	0	0	38	14th
2026	Le Mans Cup - LMP3	High Class Racing	6	0	0	0	1	31	7th
2026	GT World Challenge Europe Endurance Cup - Bronze	Razoon – more than racing	1	0	0	0	0	0	NC
2026	GT World Challenge Europe Endurance Cup - Gold	Steller Motorsport	1	0	0	0	0	12	17th
2026	European Endurance Prototype Cup	DB Autosport by MB Performance	1	0	0	0	0	1*	67th*
2026–27	Asian Le Mans Series – GT3	Proton Competition						*	*

^{*} Season still in progress.

=== Complete Formula Winter Series results ===
(key) (Races in bold indicate pole position; races in italics indicate fastest lap)

Year	Team	1	2	3	4	5	6	7	8	9	10	11	12	DC	Points
2024	Monlau Motorsport	JER; 1; 25	JER; 2; 27	JER; 3; 26	CRT; 1 DSQ	CRT; 2; 27	CRT; 3; 23	ARA; 1; 20	ARA; 2; 17	ARA; 3; 19	CAT; 1 C	CAT; 2; 27	CAT; 3; 24	38th	0

=== Complete F4 Spanish Championship results ===
(key) (Races in bold indicate pole position; races in italics indicate fastest lap)

Year	Team	1	2	3	4	5	6	7	8	9	10	11	12	13	14	15	16	17	18	19	20	21	DC	Points
2024	Monlau Motorsport	JAR; 1; 27	JAR; 2; 17	JAR; 3; 14	POR; 1; 23	POR; 2; 15	POR; 3 Ret	LEC; 1; 12	LEC; 2; 26	LEC; 3; 20	ARA; 1; 16	ARA; 2; 14	ARA; 3; 15	CRT; 1 Ret	CRT; 2; 21	CRT; 3; 32	JER; 1; 18	JER; 2; 15	JER; 3; 18	CAT; 1 Ret	CAT; 2; 22	CAT; 3 Ret	27th	0

=== Complete Eurocup-3 Spanish Winter Championship results ===
(key) (Races in bold indicate pole position) (Races in italics indicate fastest lap)

Year	Team	1	2	3	4	5	6	7	8	DC	Points
2025	Drivex	JER; 1; 12	JER; 2; 15	JER; 3 Ret	POR; 1; 21†	POR; 2; 22	POR; 3; 24	ARA; 1; 21	ARA; 2; 14	22nd	0

=== Complete Eurocup-3 results ===
(key) (Races in bold indicate pole position; races in italics indicate fastest lap)

Year	Team	1	2	3	4	5	6	7	8	9	10	11	12	13	14	15	16	17	18	DC	Points
2025	Sparco Palou MS	RBR; 1; 23	RBR; 2; 19	POR; 1 Ret	POR; SR; 19	POR; 2; 29	LEC; 1 Ret	LEC; SR; 21	LEC; 2; 16	MNZ; 1; 12	MNZ; 2; 16	ASS; 1; 19	ASS; 2 Ret	SPA; 1; 15	SPA; 2; 14	JER; 1; 19	JER; 2; 23	CAT; 1; 16	CAT; 2; 16	23rd	0

=== Complete Le Mans Cup results ===
(key) (Races in bold indicate pole position; results in italics indicate fastest lap)

Year	Entrant	Class	Chassis	1	2	3	4	5	6	Rank	Points
2026	High Class Racing	LMP3	Ligier JS P325	BAR; Ret	LEC; 15	LMS; 2	SPA; 8	SIL; 19	POR; Ret	7th	31

^{*} Season still in progress.

=== Complete European Le Mans Series results ===
(key) (Races in bold indicate pole position; results in italics indicate fastest lap)

Year	Entrant	Class	Chassis	Engine	1	2	3	4	5	6	Rank	Points
2026	Racing Spirit of Léman	LMP3	Ligier JS P325	Toyota V35A 3.5 L V6	CAT; 7	LEC; 9 (Note: Ried did not fulfil his mandated minimum drive time at the 2026 4 Hours of Le Castellet, meaning that he did not receive points for this event.)	IMO; 6	SPA; 4	SIL; 8	ALG; 6	14th	38

^{*} Season still in progress.

=== Complete GT World Challenge Europe results ===
==== GT World Challenge Europe Endurance Cup ====
(key) (Races in bold indicate pole position) (Races in italics indicate fastest lap)

Year	Team	Car	Class	1	2	3	4	5	6	7	Pos.	Points
2026	Razoon - more than racing	Porsche 911 GT3 R (992.2)	Bronze	LEC	MNZ; 40†						NC	0
2026	Steller Motorsport	Chevrolet Corvette Z06 GT3.R	Gold			SPA; 6H; 58	SPA; 12H; 45	SPA; 24H; 41	NÜR	ALG	17th	12

^{*} Season still in progress.
