= Mattia Colnaghi =

Italian and Argentinian racing driver (born 2008)

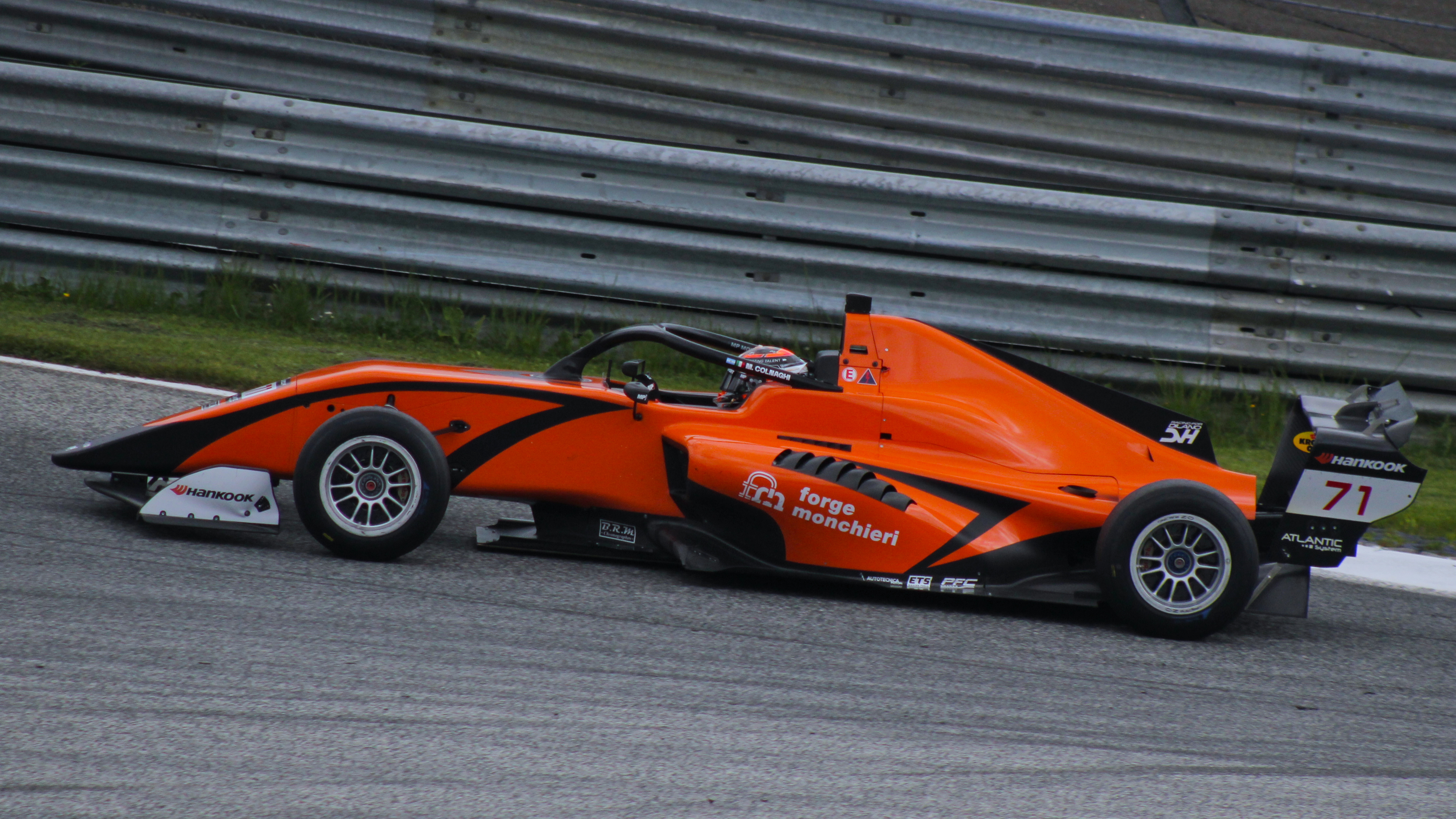
- Colnaghi driving at the Red Bull Ring during the 2025 Eurocup-3 season
- Nationality: (Italy) Italian (Argentina) Argentinian
- Born: 26 July 2008 (age 18) Monza, Italy

FIA Formula 3 Championship career
- Debut season: 2026
- Current team: Campos Racing
- Car number: TBA
- Former teams: MP Motorsport
- Starts: 19
- Wins: 0
- Podiums: 0
- Poles: 0
- Fastest laps: 0
- Best finish: 13th in 2026

Previous series
- 2025; 2024; 2024: Eurocup-3 Winter; F4 Spanish; Formula Winter Series

Championship titles
- 2024 2025: F4 Spanish; Eurocup-3

Awards
- 2024 2025: F4 Spanish Rookie Championship; Eurocup-3 Rookie Championship
- Statistics up to date as of 19 October 2026.

Mattia Colnaghi (born 26 July 2008) is an Italian and Argentinian racing driver who is set to compete in the FIA Formula 3 Championship for Campos Racing as part of the Red Bull Junior Team.

He is the 2024 F4 Spanish and 2025 Eurocup-3 champion. His title successes earned him a promotion to FIA Formula 3 in 2026 with MP Motorsport.

== Career ==
=== Karting (2020–2023) ===
Colnaghi made his karting debut in 2020, coming seventh in the Trofeo Italiano Easykart, in the Easykart 60 category. For the 2022 season, he raced for Forza Racing in the OK Junior category, coming 12th in the 50° Trofeo delle Industrie, and making his debut in the CIK-FIA World Championship, coming in 26th place.

In 2023, Colnaghi moved onto the OK category, finishing the CIK-FIA European Championship 15th overall. He also drove for CRG in the CIK-FIA World Championship and came in sixth.

=== Formula 4 (2024) ===
==== Formula Winter Series ====
Colnaghi made his single-seater and Formula 4 debut in the 2024 Formula Winter Series driving for MP Motorsport, where he drove in the first two rounds of the season.

At his debut race in the first round at Jerez, Colnaghi came in seventh place, getting his first points in the series. For the next two races, he came nineteenth and then seventh again in the third race.

Colnaghi scored only one points finish in the second round at Circuit Ricardo Tormo, where he came eighth in the second race after finishing a lowly thirty-first in his first race. Colnaghi retired from the final race, finishing the drivers championship in 18th with 16 points.

==== F4 Spanish Championship ====
After winning the Richard Mille Young Talent Shootout, Colnaghi was announced to be making his full-time Formula 4 debut in the 2024 F4 Spanish Championship with MP Motorsport. Targeting top rookie honours for the campaign, he experienced a difficult start to the season in with only an eighth place, despite scoring his first pole in the third race. He secured his first wins in the category with a double in Paul Ricard. Although he did not win in the next two rounds, Colnaghi went on to score double podiums which allowed him to maintain his title charge alive. This was followed by an outstanding four wins in the next five races in Jerez and Barcelona, allowing him to take the championship lead from longtime leader Keanu Al Azhari heading into the final race. Finishing fifth in the final race, Colnaghi was able to clinch the title, ten points ahead of Al Azhari. He became the first rookie to win the Spanish F4 championship since Nikola Tsolov, who won in 2022.

=== Formula Regional (2024–) ===
==== 2024 Macau Grand Prix ====
Colnaghi made his debut in Formula Regional machinery with MP during the 2024 Formula Regional World Cup. He did not finish the race due to a crash at the end of lap 13, but was classified in 14th since he finished 85% of the race.

==== 2025: Eurocup-3 ====
Colnaghi contested both the Eurocup-3 Winter Championship the Eurocup-3 season for 2025, continuing with MP Motorsport. He kicked off his winter series campaign at Jerez, starting his first race on pole position and converting it to a lights-to-flag race win. Colnaghi also took a podium in the third race. At the second round in Portimão he stepped on the podium in the second race and won the third race. He and his teammate, Maciej Gladysz, were closely contested for the title but in the final round at Aragón, Colnaghi left the round with no points at all, leaving Gladysz the champion and him runner-up.

In the main series, like his winter campaign, he started the first race of the opening weekend at the Red Bull Ring, on pole position, which he converted to a lights to flag win, he took another podium in the second race as well. His second race win of the series came in the first race of the third round at Paul Ricard, a third win came shortly after where he took victory in the second race of the following round at Monza. He took a double pole a round later at Assen, and came third in the first race and took victory in the second race. Colnaghi collected double podiums in the next round at Spa-Francorchamps, and clinched the Eurocup-3 title a round later at Jerez, taking a final pole position in the second race and converting it to a win.

==== 2026 Macau Grand Prix ====
Colnaghi returned to the Macau Grand Prix with MP Motorsport at the end of November.

=== FIA Formula 3 (2026–) ===
==== 2026 ====
In 2026, Colnaghi made the promotion to FIA Formula 3, remaining with MP Motorsport once more. In addition, for this season he decided to switch to an Argentine racing license, so he is no longer depicted as Italian. He scored his first point in the feature race of the opening round at Melbourne, where he came in tenth. Colnaghi went through the next four rounds pointless until the sixth round at Spa-Francorchamps, finishing fourth in both the sprint and feature race. He followed this exact performance again in the next round at the Hungaroring, coming fourth in both races. At Monza his four-place streak broke as he scored his only points finished of the round in the sprint race, with a sixth. In the final round at the Madring, he got his sole points finish in the second feature race, a fifth, enroute to thirteenth in the championship standings.

==== 2027 ====
In 2027, Colnaghi will switch to reigning champions' Campos Racing alongside Salim Hanna and Ernesto Rivera, ending a three-year association with MP Motorsport.

=== Formula One ===
In August 2025, Colnaghi was announced to be joining the Red Bull Junior Team.

== Personal life ==
Colnaghi was born in Monza, Italy to an Italian father and an Argentine mother originally from Esquel, Chubut, he spent a period of his childhood in Singapore.

== Karting record ==
=== Karting career summary ===
Season	Series	Team	Position
2020	Trofeo Italiano Easykart - Easykart 60		7th
2021	Andrea Margutti Trophy - X30 Junior	Zanchi Motorsport	
2022	50° Trofeo delle Industrie - OK Junior	Forza Racing	12th
2022	CIK-FIA World Championship - OK Junior	Forza Racing	26th
2023	CIK-FIA European Championship - OK		15th
2023	CIK-FIA World Championship - OK	CRG	6th

== Racing record ==
=== Racing career summary ===
Season	Series	Team	Races	Wins	Poles	F/Laps	Podiums	Points	Position
2024	Formula Winter Series	MP Motorsport	6	0	0	0	0	16	18th
2024	Macau Grand Prix	MP Motorsport	1	0	0	0	0	—N/a	14th†
2024	F4 Spanish Championship	KCL by MP Motorsport	21	6	7	5	12	282	**1st**
2025	Eurocup-3 Spanish Winter Championship	MP Motorsport	8	2	1	1	4	97	**2nd**
2025	Eurocup-3	MP Motorsport	16	5	4	5	10	256	**1st**
2025	Macau Grand Prix	PHM Racing	1	0	0	0	0	—N/a	4th
2026	FIA Formula 3 Championship	MP Motorsport	19	0	0	0	0	54	13th
2026	Macau Grand Prix	MP Motorsport	0	0	0	0	0	—N/a	TBD
2027	FIA Formula 3 Championship	Campos Racing	0	0	0	0	0	0	TBD

^{*} Season still in progress.

=== Complete Formula Winter Series results ===
(key) (Races in bold indicate pole position; races in italics indicate fastest lap)

Year	Team	1	2	3	4	5	6	7	8	9	10	11	12	DC	Points
2024	MP Motorsport	JER; 1; 7	JER; 2; 19	JER; 3; 7	CRT; 1; 31	CRT; 2; 8	CRT; 3 Ret	ARA; 1	ARA; 2	ARA; 3	CAT; 1	CAT; 2	CAT; 3	18th	16

=== Complete F4 Spanish Championship results ===
(key) (Races in bold indicate pole position; races in italics indicate fastest lap)

Year	Team	1	2	3	4	5	6	7	8	9	10	11	12	13	14	15	16	17	18	19	20	21	DC	Points
2024	KCL by MP Motorsport	JAR; 1; 8	JAR; 2 Ret	**JAR**; **3**; 17	ALG; 1; 2	ALG; 2; 4	ALG; 3; 9	**LEC**; **1**; 1	**LEC**; **2**; 1	LEC; 3; 5	ARA; 1; 2	ARA; 2; 7	ARA; 3; 3	CRT; 1; 14	**CRT**; **2**; 2	CRT; 3; 3	**JER**; **1**; 1	JER; 2; 3	**JER**; **3**; 1	**CAT**; **1**; 1	CAT; 2; 1	CAT; 3; 5	1st	282

=== Complete Macau Grand Prix results ===
Year	Team	Car	Qualifying	Quali Race	Main race
2024	(Netherlands) MP Motorsport	Tatuus F3 T-318	14th	DNF	14th
2025	(Germany) PHM Racing	Tatuus F3 T-318	7th	7th	4th
2026	(Netherlands) MP Motorsport	Tatuus T-326	TBD	TBD	TBD

=== Complete Eurocup-3 Spanish Winter Championship results ===
(key) (Races in bold indicate pole position) (Races in italics indicate fastest lap)

Year	Team	1	2	3	4	5	6	7	8	DC	Points
2025	MP Motorsport	**JER**; **1**; 1	JER; 2; 7	JER; 3; 3	POR; 1; 5	POR; 2; 2	POR; 3; 1	ARA; 1; 24	ARA; 2; 13	2nd	97

=== Complete Eurocup-3 results ===
(key) (Races in bold indicate pole position) (Races in italics indicate fastest lap)

Year	Team	1	2	3	4	5	6	7	8	9	10	11	12	13	14	15	16	17	18	DC	Points
2025	MP Motorsport	**RBR**; **1**; 1	RBR; 2; 2	POR; 1; 21	POR; SR; 5	POR; 2; 7	LEC; 1; 1	LEC; SR; 7	LEC; 2; 5	MNZ; 1; 6	MNZ; 2; 1	**ASS**; **1**; 3	**ASS**; **2**; 1	SPA; 1; 2	SPA; 2; 2	JER; 1; 3	**JER**; **2**; 1	CAT; 1	CAT; 2	1st	256

=== Complete FIA Formula 3 Championship results ===
(key) (Races in bold indicate pole position) (Races in italics indicate fastest lap)

Year	Entrant	1	2	3	4	5	6	7	8	9	10	11	12	13	14	15	16	17	18	19	20	DC	Points
2026	MP Motorsport	MEL; SPR; 30	MEL; FEA; 10	MON; SPR; 11	MON; FEA; 19	CAT; SPR; Ret	CAT; FEA; 18	RBR; SPR; 17	RBR; FEA; 20	SIL; SPR; 15	SIL; FEA; 20	SPA; SPR; 4	SPA; FEA; 4	HUN; SPR; 4	HUN; FEA; 4	MNZ; SPR; 6	MNZ; FEA; 19	MAD; SPR; 14	MAD; FEA1; 12	MAD; FEA2; 5		13th	54
2027	Campos Racing	BHR; SPR	BHR; FEA	JED; SPR	JED; FEA	MEL; SPR	MEL; FEA	MTL; SPR	MTL; FEA	MON; SPR	MON; FEA	SIL; SPR	SIL; FEA	RBR; SPR	RBR; FEA	MNZ; SPR	MNZ; FEA	MAD; SPR	MAD; FEA	IST; SPR	IST; FEA	TBD	TBD

Sporting positions
Preceded by Théophile Naël	F4 Spanish Championship; Champion; 2024	Succeeded by Thomas Strauven
Preceded by Christian Ho	Eurocup-3; Champion; 2025	Succeeded by Incumbent
