= Daniel Nogales =

Spanish racing driver (born 2003)

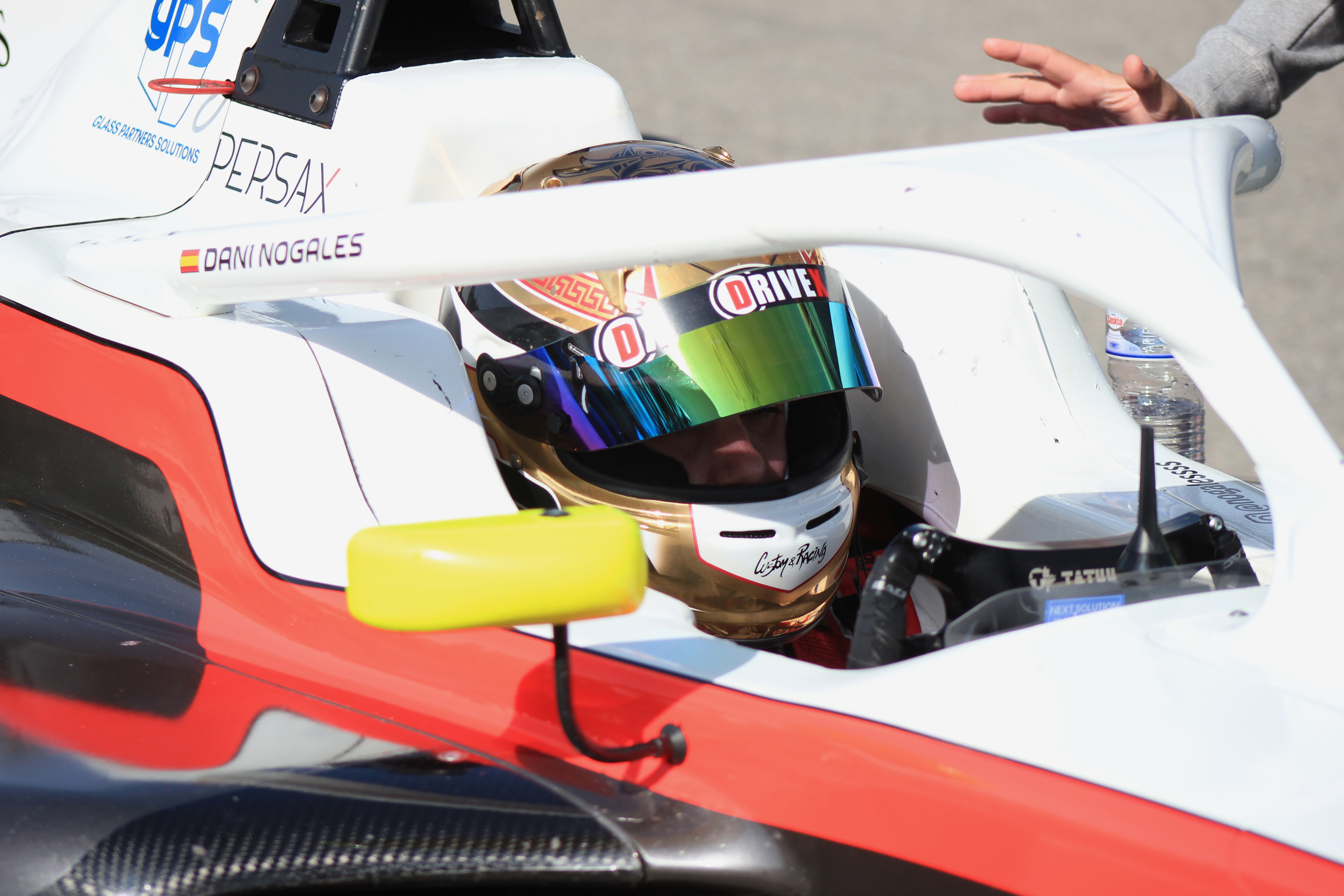
- Nogales in 2023
- Nationality: (Spain) Spanish
- Born: Daniel Nogales López; 28 February 2003 (age 23) Navalcarnero, Spain

European Le Mans Series career
- Debut season: 2025
- Current team: Virage Team
- Categorisation: FIA Silver
- Car number: 8

Daniel Nogales López (born 28 February 2003 in Navalcarnero) is a Spanish racing driver who last competed in the LMP3 class of the European Le Mans Series for Team Virage.

== Career ==
Nogales started karting at the age of six, competing at his local track of Torrejón. Racing in karts until 2021, he most notably won the RMC Grand Finals in 2014 and 2015 in the Micro and Mini max classes respectively, along with winning the 2021 Spanish Karting Championship in X30 Senior.

After competing in both the Clio Cup Spain and Europe championships in 2021, Nogales joined Teo Martín Motorsport to make his single-seater debut in the 2022 F4 Spanish Championship.

Scoring just one points finish in the first four rounds, a tenth in the third race at Algarve, Nogales left the team and joined Drivex ahead of the Aragón round. After taking points on his debut with the team, Nogales only missed the points four times in the last seven races of the season, taking a best result of sixth in the second Navarra race on his way to 14th in points. During 2022, Nogales also made a one-off appearance at the Red Bull Ring round of the Euroformula Open Championship. After retiring in both the first two races, Nogales finished eighth in the third race of the weekend.

Nogales remained with Drivex in 2023 for his sophomore season in the F4 Spanish Championship. Despite finishing eighth in the season-opening Spa round, Nogales went scoreless in the next two rounds before moving up to Eurocup-3 with the same team. Racing in the final six rounds of the season, Nogales missed the top-ten only twice, taking a best result of sixth in race one at Jerez and finishing 12th in the standings despite missing the first two rounds.

In 2024, Nogales returned to Drivex for his sophomore season in Eurocup-3. In the first five rounds of the season, Nogales only scored points twice, with a best result of ninth in race two at the Red Bull Ring, before leaving for Saintéloc Racing ahead of the Aragón round. With the French team, Nogales finished fourth in the season-finale at Barcelona, but was given the points for third place as Nikita Bedrin, who finished third, was ineligible for points.

Having made his LMP3 debut in late 2024 in the Ultimate Cup Series, Nogales joined Team Virage to compete full-time in the LMP3 class of the European Le Mans Series. In his first season in LMP3 competition, Nogales won at Spa and finished second at Algarve to end the year runner-up in the standings. Despite a one-off return to single-seater competition in the Eurocup-3 Spanish Winter Championship for Drivex in 2026, Nogales remained in sportscar competition for the rest of the year, returning to Team Virage for a second season in ELMS. On his return to Team Virage, Nogales took a lone podium at Imola to end the year ninth in points.

== Karting record ==
=== Karting career summary ===
Season	Series	Team	Position
2012	Spanish Karting Championship - Alevin		13th
2012	Rotax Max Challenge Grand Finals - Micro Max		12th
2013	Spanish Karting Championship - Alevin		8th
2014	Spanish Karting Championship - Alevin		4th
2014	Rotax Max Challenge Grand Finals - Micro Max	ART Burgueo Team	1st
2015	Rotax Max Challenge Grand Finals - Mini Max	Birel Art Burgueno Team	1st
2016	Spanish Karting Championship - Cadet		7th
2017	IAME International Final - X30 Junior	Unomatricula K-Team	NC
2018	WSK Super Master Series - OKJ	Unomatricula K-Team	120nd
2018	Karting European Championship - OKJ	Unomatricula K-Team	95th
2018	IAME International Final - X30 Junior	Unomatricula K-Team	26th
2018	WSK Final Cup - OKJ	Unomatricula K-Team	97th
2018	Spanish Karting Championship - Junior		3rd
2019	IAME Winter Cup - X30 Senior	Kart Republic Spain	23rd
2019	IAME Euro Series - X30 Senior	Kart Republic Spain	NC
2019	IAME International Final - X30 Senior		NC
2019	Spanish Karting Championship - Senior		6th
2020	IAME Winter Cup - X30 Senior	Kart Republic Spain	3rd
2020	LeCont Trophy - X30 Senior	Kart Republic Spain	6th
2020	IAME Euro Series - X30 Senior	Kart Republic Spain	15th
2020	IAME International Games - X30 Senior	Kart Republic Spain	16th
2021	IAME Winter Cup - X30 Senior	Kart Republic Spain	25th
2021	IAME Euro Series - X30 Senior	Kart Republic Spain	118th
2021	Champions of the Future - OK	Kart Republic Spain	102nd
2021	Karting World Championship - OK	Kart Republic Spain	NC
2021	Spanish Karting Championship - X30 Senior		1st

== Racing record ==
=== Racing career summary ===
Season	Series	Team	Races	Wins	Poles	F/Laps	Podiums	Points	Position
2021	Clio Cup Europe	Cota Automocion - Team VRT	8	0	0	0	0	42	47th
2022	F4 Spanish Championship	Teo Martín Motorsport	12	0	0	0	0	26	14th
2022	F4 Spanish Championship	Drivex School	9	0	0	0	0	26	14th
2022	Euroformula Open Championship	Drivex School	3	0	0	0	0	4	16th
2023	F4 Spanish Championship	Drivex	9	0	0	0	0	5	18th
2023	Eurocup-3	Drivex	12	0	0	0	0	34	12th
2024	Eurocup-3	Drivex	10	0	0	0	0	23	15th
2024	Eurocup-3	Saintéloc Racing	6	0	0	1	0	23	15th
2024	F4 Spanish Championship	DXR by Drivex	3	0	0	0	0	0	26th
2024	Ultimate Cup Series - Proto P3	TS Corse	1	0	0	0	0	6	45th
2025	Prototype Winter Series	Team Virage	4	1	0	0	0	39	5th
2025	European Le Mans Series - LMP3	Team Virage	6	1	0	0	2	69	**2nd**
2025	Italian GT Championship Endurance Cup - GT3	Audi Sport Italia	1	0	0	0	0	0	NC
2026	Eurocup-3 Spanish Winter Championship	Drivex	3	0	0	0	0	0	22nd
2026	European Le Mans Series – LMP3	Team Virage	6	0	0	0	1	46	9th
2026	Ligier European Series – JS P4	Petrogold	3	0	0	0	0	0	28th

=== Complete F4 Spanish Championship results ===
(key) (Races in bold indicate pole position; races in italics indicate fastest lap)

Year	Team	1	2	3	4	5	6	7	8	9	10	11	12	13	14	15	16	17	18	19	20	21	DC	Points
2022	Teo Martín Motorsport	ALG; 1; 20	ALG; 2; 16	ALG; 3; 10	JER; 1; 21	JER; 2 Ret	JER; 3; 26†	CRT; 1; 14	CRT; 2; 23	CRT; 3; 15	SPA; 1; 20	SPA; 2; 29	SPA; 3 Ret										14th	26
2022	Drivex School													ARA; 1; 10	ARA; 2; 10	ARA; 3; 11	NAV; 1; 7	NAV; 2; 6	NAV; 3; 7	CAT; 1; 8	CAT; 2; 15	CAT; 3; 11	14th	26
2023	Drivex	SPA; 1; 10	SPA; 2; 20	SPA; 3; 8	ARA; 1 Ret	ARA; 2; 27†	ARA; 3; 18	NAV; 1; 16	NAV; 2; 16	NAV; 3; 13	JER; 1	JER; 2	JER; 3	EST; 1	EST; 2	EST; 3	CRT; 1	CRT; 2	CRT; 3	CAT; 1	CAT; 2	CAT; 3	18th	5
2024	DXR by Drivex	JAR; 1; 34	JAR; 2; 10	JAR; 3; 15	POR; 1	POR; 2	POR; 3	LEC; 1	LEC; 2	LEC; 3	ARA; 1	ARA; 2	ARA; 3	CRT; 1	CRT; 2	CRT; 3	JER; 1	JER; 2	JER; 3	CAT; 1	CAT; 2	CAT; 3	26th	0

=== Complete Euroformula Open Championship results ===
(key) (Races in bold indicate pole position; races in italics indicate points for the fastest lap of top ten finishers)

Year	Entrant	1	2	3	4	5	6	7	8	9	10	11	12	13	14	15	16	17	18	19	20	21	22	23	24	25	26	DC	Points
2022	Drivex School	POR; 1	POR; 2	POR; 3	PAU; 1	PAU; 2	LEC; 1	LEC; 2	LEC; 3	SPA; 1	SPA; 2	SPA; 3	HUN; 1	HUN; 2	HUN; 3	IMO; 1	IMO; 2	IMO; 3	RBR; 1 Ret	RBR; 2 Ret	RBR; 3; 8	MNZ; 1	MNZ; 2	MNZ; 3	CAT; 1	CAT; 2	CAT; 3	16th	4

=== Complete Eurocup-3 results ===
(key) (Races in bold indicate pole position) (Races in italics indicate fastest lap)

Year	Team	1	2	3	4	5	6	7	8	9	10	11	12	13	14	15	16	17	DC	Points
2023	Drivex	SPA; 1	SPA; 2	ARA; 1	ARA; 2	MNZ; 1; 7	MNZ; 2; 9	ZAN; 1; 9	ZAN; 2; 9	JER; 1; 6	JER; 2; 8	EST; 1; 11	EST; 2; 13	CRT; 1; 10	CRT; 2; 10	CAT; 1; 8	CAT; 2; 7		12th	36
2024	Drivex	SPA; 1; 13	SPA; 2 C	RBR; 1; 12	RBR; 2; 9	POR; 1; 10	POR; 2; 11	POR; 3; 17	LEC; 1; 11	LEC; 2; 13	ZAN; 1; 11	ZAN; 2; 12							15th	23
2024	Saintéloc Racing												ARA; 1; 11	ARA; 2; 17	JER; 1 Ret	JER; 2; 9	CAT; 1 Ret	CAT; 2; 4	15th	23

=== Complete European Le Mans Series results ===
(key) (Races in bold indicate pole position; results in italics indicate fastest lap)

Year	Entrant	Class	Chassis	Engine	1	2	3	4	5	6	Rank	Points
2025	Team Virage	LMP3	Ligier JS P325	Toyota V35A 3.5 L V6	CAT; 8	LEC; Ret	IMO; 5	SPA; 1	SIL; 4	ALG; 2	2nd	69
2026	Team Virage	LMP3	Ligier JS P325	Toyota V35A 3.5 L V6	CAT; 5	LEC; 8	IMO; 3	SPA; 5	SIL; 10	ALG; 7	9th	46

^{*} Season still in progress.

=== Complete Eurocup-3 Spanish Winter Championship results ===
(key) (Races in bold indicate pole position) (Races in italics indicate fastest lap)

Year	Team	1	2	3	4	5	6	7	8	9	DC	Points
2026	Drivex	POR; 1; 19	POR; SPR; 11	POR; 2 Ret	JAR; 1	JAR; SPR	JAR; 2	ARA; 1	ARA; SPR	ARA; 2	22nd	0
