= Ádám Hideg =

Hungarian racing driver

- Nationality: (Hungary) Hungarian
- Born: 9 January 2008 (age 18) Kaposvár, Hungary

Eurocup-3 career
- Debut season: 2025
- Current team: Palou Motorsport
- Car number: TBC
- Starts: 0
- Wins: 0
- Podiums: 0
- Poles: 0
- Fastest laps: 0
- Best finish: TBD in 2025

Previous series
- 2024 2024: Formula Winter Series; F4 Spanish Championship

Ádám Hideg (born 9 January 2008) is a Hungarian racing driver. He most recently competed in the 2024 F4 Spanish Championship with Cram Motorsport, and is set to compete in the 2025 Eurocup-3 season with Palou Motorsport.

== Career ==
=== Karting ===
Hideg drove a kart for the first time in Kaposvár when he was 4-5 years old and continued to develop his skills on a local karting track from the age of seven. Not much later, he started competitive karting. His first test took place in Kecskemét, and at first he participated in championships in Hungary and neighboring countries, including the Moravian Cup.

In 2018, Hideg competed for a Hungarian team in Italy in the 60 Mini category in the prestigious WSK series, and from 2019 he became a permanent participant in the field with Lennox Racing, BabyRace and Kidix teams.

Hideg entered the junior category in 2021, at first with KidiX, then from 2022 with the DPK Racing team linked to Fernando Alonso, before becoming a factory driver for Sodi Kart. In addition to WSK, he also competed in the Champions of the Future, the FIA Karting European Championship and the FIA Karting World Championship, and was selected as a member of the Hungarian Motorsport Academy.

With his second place in the OK Junior category at the 2022 FIA Karting World Championship, Hideg achieved a unique success in the history of Hungarian karting.

After the World Championship, at the end of 2022 and at the beginning of 2023, Hideg competed in the adult OK category, before starting his preparations for his Formula 4 career.

=== Formula 4 ===
In January 2024 Jenzer Motorsport announced that Hideg would join the Swiss team to compete in Formula Winter Series and the Italian F4 Championship. He started his season in the 2024 Formula Winter Series, where he impressed, scoring points in the third round at MotorLand Aragón. He then secured a pole position for the race which was resultantly cancelled in the final round at the Circuit de Barcelona-Catalunya, as he finished 20th in the standings, with ten points. It was later confirmed that Hideg would not be continuing with Jenzer Motorsport for Italian F4, and confirmed his move to Cram Motorsport for the 2024 F4 Spanish Championship. Hideg scored points in the first weekend at Jarama, finishing sixth, in what would end up being his highest finishing position of the season. His only other points finish of the season was a seventh-placed finish in the fourth round at Aragón. He ended the season 17th in the standings, finishing above all his teammates and scoring all fourteen of Cram Motorsport's points in the championship standings.

=== Eurocup-3 ===
For 2025, it was confirmed that Hideg would step up to join Palou Motorsport for the 2025 Eurocup-3 season. He also drove for the team in the Eurocup-3 Spanish Winter Championship. He is currently 21st in the championship, with a best finish of 13th place.

== Personal life ==
Hideg comes from a rallying family, his grandfather is a two-time Hungarian rally champion, and his father, Krisztián Hideg, is a three-time Croatian rally champion.

== Karting record ==
=== Karting career summary ===
Season	Series	Team	Position
2017	BNL Golden Trophy - Micro Max		6th
2017	Hungarian International Open - Micro Max	Hideg-Szikszai Racing	5th
2018	Hungarian International Open - Micro Max	Hideg-Szikszai Racing	38th
2018	WSK Champions Cup - 60 Mini	Top Motorsport	NC
2018	WSK Super Master Series - 60 Mini	Top Motorsport	86th
2018	WSK Open Cup - 60 Mini	Lennox Racing Team	NC
2018	WSK Final Cup - 60 Mini	BabyRace Driver Academy	86th
2019	WSK Champions Cup - 60 Mini	BabyRace Driver Academy	28th
2019	WSK Super Master Series - 60 Mini	BabyRace Driver Academy	50th
2019	South Garda Winter Cup - Mini Rok	BabyRace Driver Academy	12th
2019	Andrea Margutti Trophy - 60 Mini	BabyRace Driver Academy	13th
2019	WSK Euro Series - 60 Mini	BabyRace Driver Academy	32nd
2019	WSK Open Cup - 60 Mini	BabyRace Driver Academy	14th
2019	WSK Final Cup - 60 Mini	BabyRace Driver Academy	NC
2019	ROK Cup Superfinal - Mini Rok	BabyRace Driver Academy	15th
2020	WSK Champions Cup - 60 Mini	BabyRace Driver Academy	30th
2020	WSK Super Master Series - 60 Mini	BabyRace Driver Academy	9th
2020	South Garda Winter Cup - Mini Rok	BabyRace Driver Academy	8th
2020	WSK Euro Series - 60 Mini	BabyRace Driver Academy	15th
2020	Champions of the Future - 60 Mini	Kidix	4th
2021	WSK Champions Cup - OKJ	KR Motorsport	18th
2021	WSK Super Master Series - OKJ	KR Motorsport	61st
2021	WSK Euro Series - OKJ	Revesz TRT KFT	38th
2021	Champions of the Future - OKJ	Kidix	69th
2021	CIK-FIA European Championship - OKJ	Revesz TRT KFT	47th
2021	WSK Open Cup - OKJ	Revesz TRT KFT	22nd
2022	WSK Super Master Series - OKJ	DPK Racing	24th
2022	Champions of the Future Winter Series - OKJ	DPK Racing	8th
2022	Champions of the Future - OKJ	DPK Racing	15th
2022	CIK-FIA European Championship - OKJ	DPK Racing	18th
2022	WSK Euro Series - OKJ	Sodikart	35th
2022	CIK-FIA World Championship - OKJ	Sodikart	2nd
2022	WSK Final Cup - OK	Sodikart	17th
2023	WSK Super Master Series - OK	Sodikart	48th
2023	Champions of the Future - OK	Sodikart	58th
2023	CIK-FIA European Championship - OK	Sodikart	82nd

== Racing record ==
=== Racing career summary ===
Season	Series	Team	Races	Wins	Poles	F/Laps	Podiums	Points	Position
2024	Formula Winter Series	Jenzer Motorsport	11	0	1	0	0	10	20th
2024	F4 Spanish Championship	Cram Motorsport	21	0	0	0	0	14	17th
2025	Eurocup-3 Spanish Winter Championship	Sparco Palou MS	8	0	0	0	0	2	19th
2025	Eurocup-3	Drivex	2	0	0	0	0	0	NC†

=== Complete Formula Winter Series results ===
(key) (Races in bold indicate pole position; races in italics indicate fastest lap)

Year	Team	1	2	3	4	5	6	7	8	9	10	11	12	DC	Points
2024	Jenzer Motorsport	JER; 1; 18	JER; 2; 25	JER; 3; 15	CRT; 1; 20	CRT; 2; 16	CRT; 3; 22	ARA; 1; 12	ARA; 2; 6	ARA; 3; 9	**CAT**; **1** C	CAT; 2; 17	CAT; 3 Ret	20th	10

=== Complete F4 Spanish Championship results ===
(key) (Races in bold indicate pole position; races in italics indicate fastest lap)

Year	Team	1	2	3	4	5	6	7	8	9	10	11	12	13	14	15	16	17	18	19	20	21	DC	Points
2024	Cram Motorsport	JAR; 1; 23	JAR; 2; 16	JAR; 3; 6	POR; 1; 18	POR; 2; 14	POR; 3; 23	LEC; 1; 26	LEC; 2; 10	LEC; 3; 17	ARA; 1; 7	ARA; 2; 13	ARA; 3; 24	CRT; 1 Ret	CRT; 2; 23	CRT; 3; 22	JER; 1; 17	JER; 2; 22	JER; 3; 23	CAT; 1; 24	CAT; 2; 24	CAT; 3 Ret	17th	14

=== Complete Eurocup-3 Spanish Winter Championship results ===
(key) (Races in bold indicate pole position) (Races in italics indicate fastest lap)

Year	Team	1	2	3	4	5	6	7	8	DC	Points
2025	Sparco Palou MS	JER; 1; 13	JER; 2; 17	JER; 3 Ret	POR; 1; 13	POR; 2; 13	POR; 3; 16	ARA; 1; 14	ARA; 2; 10	19th	2

=== Complete Eurocup-3 results ===
(key) (Races in bold indicate pole position) (Races in italics indicate fastest lap)

Year	Team	1	2	3	4	5	6	7	8	9	10	11	12	13	14	15	16	DC	Points
2025	Palou Motorsport	RBR; 1	RBR; 2	POR; 1	POR; 2	LEC; 1	LEC; 2	MNZ; 1	MNZ; 2	ASS; 1	ASS; 2	SPA; 1	SPA; 2	JER; 1	JER; 2	CAT; 1; 20	CAT; 2 Ret	NC†	0

† As Hideg was a guest driver, he was ineligible for points.
