= 2024 F4 Spanish Championship =

Motor racing season

The 2024 F4 Spanish Championship was the ninth season of the F4 Spanish Championship. It is a multi-event motor racing championship for open wheel, formula racing cars regulated according to FIA Formula 4 regulations, based in Spain.

== Entry list ==
Team	No.	Driver	Class	Rounds
(Netherlands) / MP Motorsport (Note: Cars No. 3, No. 9 and No. 14 entered as MP Motorsport, cars No. 7, No. 27 and No. 71 entered as KCL by MP Motorsport.); (Netherlands) / KCL by MP Motorsport	3	(Australia) Griffin Peebles		All
(Netherlands) / MP Motorsport; (Netherlands) / KCL by MP Motorsport	7	(Poland) Maciej Gładysz	R	All
(Netherlands) / MP Motorsport; (Netherlands) / KCL by MP Motorsport	9	(Netherlands) René Lammers	R	All
(Netherlands) / MP Motorsport; (Netherlands) / KCL by MP Motorsport	14	(United Arab Emirates) Keanu Al Azhari		All
(Netherlands) / MP Motorsport; (Netherlands) / KCL by MP Motorsport	27	(Spain) Lucas Fluxá	R	All
(Netherlands) / MP Motorsport; (Netherlands) / KCL by MP Motorsport	71	(Italy) Mattia Colnaghi	R	All
(Spain) / Drivex (Note: Cars No. 4, No. 19 and No. 33 entered as Drivex, cars No. 29 and No. 66 entered as DXR by Drivex.); (Spain) / DXR by Drivex	4	(Spain) Juan Cota		All
(Spain) / Drivex; (Spain) / DXR by Drivex	19	(Slovakia) Matúš Ryba	R	All
(Spain) / Drivex; (Spain) / DXR by Drivex	29	(Spain) Daniel Nogales		1
(Spain) / Drivex; (Spain) / DXR by Drivex	29	(Spain) Eloi González	R	2
(Spain) / Drivex; (Spain) / DXR by Drivex	29	(France) Pacôme Weisenburger	R	3
(Spain) / Drivex; (Spain) / DXR by Drivex	29	(Argentina) Gino Trappa	R	5
(Spain) / Drivex; (Spain) / DXR by Drivex	29	(Australia) Joanne Ciconte	R F G	6–7
(Spain) / Drivex; (Spain) / DXR by Drivex	33	(Denmark) Mikkel Gaarde Pedersen		1–4
(Spain) / Drivex; (Spain) / DXR by Drivex	33	(Austria) Oscar Wurz	R	5
(Spain) / Drivex; (Spain) / DXR by Drivex	33	(Lebanon) Christopher El Feghali	R G	6–7
(Spain) / Drivex; (Spain) / DXR by Drivex	66	(Portugal) Francisco Macedo	R	All
(Spain) GRS Team	5	(India) Jaden Pariat		1
(Spain) GRS Team	5	(United States) Lia Block	F	2–3
(Spain) GRS Team	5	(Ecuador) Rafael Terán	R	4, 7
(Spain) GRS Team	5	(Netherlands) Reno Francot		5
(Spain) GRS Team	5	(Angola) Lorenzo Campos	R G	6
(Spain) GRS Team	11	(Kyrgyzstan) Kirill Kutskov (Note: Kutskov is Russian, but he competes under a Kyrgyz licence as Russian national emblems were banned by the FIA following the Russian invasion of Ukraine.)	R	1
(Spain) GRS Team	11	(United States) Alexander Jacoby	R	2–7
(Spain) GRS Team	28	(Belgium) Douwe Dedecker		1–3
(Spain) GRS Team	28	(Spain) Nerea Martí	F	4–5
(Spain) GRS Team	28	(Italy) Edoardo Iacobucci	R G	6
(Spain) GRS Team	28	(Israel) Ariel Elkin	G	7
(Spain) Tecnicar Motorsport	6	(Serbia) Andrej Petrović	G	7
(Spain) Tecnicar Motorsport	10	(Mexico) Lorenzo Castillo	R	1–6
(Spain) Tecnicar Motorsport	10	(Czech Republic) Teodor Borenstein	R G	7
(Spain) Tecnicar Motorsport	12	(Poland) Gustaw Wiśniewski	R	1–2
(Spain) Tecnicar Motorsport	12	(United Arab Emirates) Adam Al Azhari	R	3–7
(Spain) Tecnicar Motorsport	32	(Poland) Wiktor Dobrzański	R	All
(Spain) / Campos Racing (Note: Cars No. 8, No. 46 and No. 48 entered as Campos Racing, cars No. 18, No. 23 and No. 24 entered as Griffin Core by Campos.); (Spain) / Griffin Core by Campos	8	(Thailand) Enzo Tarnvanichkul	R	All
(Spain) / Campos Racing; (Spain) / Griffin Core by Campos	18	(Peru) Andrés Cárdenas		All
(Spain) / Campos Racing; (Spain) / Griffin Core by Campos	23	(Poland) Jan Przyrowski	R	All
(Spain) / Campos Racing; (Spain) / Griffin Core by Campos	24	(Mexico) Ernesto Rivera	R	All
(Spain) / Campos Racing; (Spain) / Griffin Core by Campos	46	(United Kingdom) Nathan Tye	R	All
(Spain) / Campos Racing; (Spain) / Griffin Core by Campos	48	(United States) James Egozi		All
(France) Saintéloc Racing	21	(Sri Lanka) Yevan David	R	1–6
(France) Saintéloc Racing	21	(Netherlands) Reno Francot		7
(France) Saintéloc Racing	69	(Colombia) Maximiliano Restrepo		1–6
(France) Saintéloc Racing	69	(Mexico) Lorenzo Castillo		7
(France) Saintéloc Racing	93	(United Arab Emirates) Matteo Quintarelli		1–5
(France) Saintéloc Racing	93	(Israel) Ariel Elkin	G	6
(France) Saintéloc Racing	93	(Austria) Oscar Wurz	R	7
(New Zealand) Rodin Motorsport	22	(Australia) Peter Bouzinelos	R	All
(New Zealand) Rodin Motorsport	55	(United States) Preston Lambert	R	1–4
(New Zealand) Rodin Motorsport	55	(Australia) Alex Ninovic		5
(New Zealand) Rodin Motorsport	55	(United Kingdom) Chase Fernandez	R G	6
(New Zealand) Rodin Motorsport	55	(India) Ary Bansal	R G	7
(New Zealand) Rodin Motorsport	99	(Belgium) Thomas Strauven	R	1–6
(New Zealand) Rodin Motorsport	99	(United Kingdom) Chase Fernandez	R G	7
(Italy) Cram Motorsport	35	(Hungary) Ádám Hideg	R	All
(Italy) Cram Motorsport	37	(Brazil) Filippo Fiorentino	R	1–6
(Spain) Monlau Motorsport	50	(Netherlands) Tim Gerhards	R	All
(Spain) Monlau Motorsport	74	(India) Rehan Hakim	R	1–4
(Spain) Monlau Motorsport	74	(Spain) Eloi González	R	5
(Spain) Monlau Motorsport	74	(United States) Hudson Schwartz	R G	7
(Spain) Monlau Motorsport	75	(Japan) Hiyu Yamakoshi	G	4
(Spain) Monlau Motorsport	77	(Germany) Lenny Ried	R	All
(Spain) TC Racing	78	(Brazil) Gabriel Gomez	R	All
(Spain) TC Racing	88	(Mexico) Cristian Cantú		All

Icon	Legend
R	Rookie
F	Female Trophy
G	Guest drivers ineligible to score points

- Palou Motorsport was scheduled to compete in the championship but the team did not appear in any rounds.
- Flavio Olivieri was scheduled to join Cram Motorsport for his sophomore year, but withdrew prior to the season to take part in Porsche Carrera Cup Italy.

== Race calendar and results ==
The calendar was announced on 2 November 2023.

Round		Circuit	Date	Pole position	Fastest lap	Winning driver	Winning team	Rookie winner	Supporting
1	R1	(Spain) Circuito del Jarama, San Sebastián de los Reyes	11 May	(Spain) Lucas Fluxá	(Belgium) Thomas Strauven	(Spain) Lucas Fluxá	(Netherlands) KCL by MP Motorsport	(Spain) Lucas Fluxá	
1	R2	(Spain) Circuito del Jarama, San Sebastián de los Reyes	12 May	(Belgium) Thomas Strauven	(United Arab Emirates) Keanu Al Azhari	(Belgium) Thomas Strauven	(United Kingdom) Rodin Motorsport	(Belgium) Thomas Strauven	
1	R3	(Spain) Circuito del Jarama, San Sebastián de los Reyes	12 May	(Italy) Mattia Colnaghi	(United Arab Emirates) Matteo Quintarelli	(Spain) Lucas Fluxá	(Netherlands) KCL by MP Motorsport	(Spain) Lucas Fluxá	
2	R1	(Portugal) Algarve International Circuit, Portimão	8 June	(United Arab Emirates) Keanu Al Azhari	(Belgium) Thomas Strauven	(United Arab Emirates) Keanu Al Azhari	(Netherlands) MP Motorsport	(Italy) Mattia Colnaghi	Eurocup-3
2	R2	(Portugal) Algarve International Circuit, Portimão	9 June	(United Arab Emirates) Keanu Al Azhari	(Australia) Griffin Peebles	(Mexico) Ernesto Rivera	(Spain) Campos Racing	(Mexico) Ernesto Rivera	Eurocup-3
2	R3	(Portugal) Algarve International Circuit, Portimão	9 June	(United Arab Emirates) Keanu Al Azhari	(Belgium) Thomas Strauven	(United Arab Emirates) Keanu Al Azhari	(Netherlands) MP Motorsport	(United Kingdom) Nathan Tye	Eurocup-3
3	R1	(France) Circuit Paul Ricard, Le Castellet	6 July	(Italy) Mattia Colnaghi	(Italy) Mattia Colnaghi	(Italy) Mattia Colnaghi	(Netherlands) KCL by MP Motorsport	(Italy) Mattia Colnaghi	Eurocup-3
3	R2	(France) Circuit Paul Ricard, Le Castellet	7 July	(Italy) Mattia Colnaghi	(Italy) Mattia Colnaghi	(Italy) Mattia Colnaghi	(Netherlands) KCL by MP Motorsport	(Italy) Mattia Colnaghi	Eurocup-3
3	R3	(France) Circuit Paul Ricard, Le Castellet	7 July	(Poland) Maciej Gładysz	(Poland) Jan Przyrowski	(Poland) Maciej Gładysz	(Netherlands) KCL by MP Motorsport	(Poland) Maciej Gładysz	Eurocup-3
4	R1	(Spain) MotorLand Aragón, Alcañiz	27 July	(Poland) Maciej Gładysz	(United Arab Emirates) Keanu Al Azhari	(Poland) Maciej Gładysz	(Netherlands) KCL by MP Motorsport	(Poland) Maciej Gładysz	Eurocup-3
4	R2	(Spain) MotorLand Aragón, Alcañiz	28 July	(Poland) Maciej Gładysz	(Poland) Maciej Gładysz	(Poland) Maciej Gładysz	(Netherlands) KCL by MP Motorsport	(Poland) Maciej Gładysz	Eurocup-3
4	R3	(Spain) MotorLand Aragón, Alcañiz	28 July	(United Arab Emirates) Keanu Al Azhari	(Poland) Jan Przyrowski	(United Arab Emirates) Keanu Al Azhari	(Netherlands) MP Motorsport	(Italy) Mattia Colnaghi	Eurocup-3
5	R1	(Spain) Circuit Ricardo Tormo, Cheste	14 September	(Australia) Griffin Peebles	(Spain) Juan Cota	(Spain) Juan Cota	(Spain) Drivex	(Thailand) Enzo Tarnvanichkul	
5	R2	(Spain) Circuit Ricardo Tormo, Cheste	15 September	(Italy) Mattia Colnaghi	(Italy) Mattia Colnaghi	(Spain) Juan Cota	(Spain) Drivex	(Italy) Mattia Colnaghi	
5	R3	(Spain) Circuit Ricardo Tormo, Cheste	15 September	(Spain) Juan Cota	(Spain) Juan Cota	(Spain) Juan Cota	(Spain) Drivex	(Italy) Mattia Colnaghi	
6	R1	(Spain) Circuito de Jerez, Jerez de la Frontera	5 October	(Italy) Mattia Colnaghi (Note: Keanu Al Azhari set the fastest time in Qualifying 1 but received a three-place grid penalty. Colnaghi inherited the pole position but two bonus points were awarded to Keanu Al Azhari.)	(Spain) Juan Cota	(Italy) Mattia Colnaghi	(Netherlands) KCL by MP Motorsport	(Italy) Mattia Colnaghi	Eurocup-3
6	R2	(Spain) Circuito de Jerez, Jerez de la Frontera	6 October	(United Arab Emirates) Keanu Al Azhari	(United Arab Emirates) Keanu Al Azhari	(United Arab Emirates) Keanu Al Azhari	(Netherlands) MP Motorsport	(Poland) Maciej Gładysz	Eurocup-3
6	R3	(Spain) Circuito de Jerez, Jerez de la Frontera	6 October	(Italy) Mattia Colnaghi	(Italy) Mattia Colnaghi	(Italy) Mattia Colnaghi	(Netherlands) KCL by MP Motorsport	(Italy) Mattia Colnaghi	Eurocup-3
7	R1	(Spain) Circuit de Barcelona-Catalunya, Montmeló	9 November	(Italy) Mattia Colnaghi	(Italy) Mattia Colnaghi	(Italy) Mattia Colnaghi	(Netherlands) KCL by MP Motorsport	(Italy) Mattia Colnaghi	Eurocup-3
7	R2	(Spain) Circuit de Barcelona-Catalunya, Montmeló	10 November	(Australia) Griffin Peebles	(Poland) Jan Przyrowski	(Italy) Mattia Colnaghi	(Netherlands) KCL by MP Motorsport	(Italy) Mattia Colnaghi	Eurocup-3
7	R3	(Spain) Circuit de Barcelona-Catalunya, Montmeló	10 November	(United States) James Egozi	(Spain) Juan Cota	(Spain) Juan Cota	(Spain) Drivex	(Thailand) Enzo Tarnvanichkul	Eurocup-3

== Championship standings ==
Points were awarded to the top ten classified finishers in 30-minute races and for the top nine classified finishers in 25-minute races.

Races	Position, points per race											
Races	**1st**	**2nd**	**3rd**	**4th**	**5th**	**6th**	**7th**	**8th**	**9th**	**10th**	**Pole**	**FL**
30-minute races	25	18	15	12	10	8	6	4	2	1	2	1
25-minute races	18	15	12	10	8	6	4	2	1			1

=== Drivers' championship ===
Pos	Driver	JAR (Spain)			POR (Portugal)			LEC (France)			ARA (Spain)			CRT (Spain)			JER (Spain)			CAT (Spain)			Pts
Pos	Driver	R1	R2	R3	R1	R2	R3	R1	R2	R3	R1	R2	R3	R1	R2	R3	R1	R2	R3	R1	R2	R3	Pts
1	(Italy) Mattia Colnaghi	8	Ret	**17**	2	4	9	**1**	**1**	5	2	7	3	14	**2**	3	**1**	3	**1**	**1**	1	5	282
2	(United Arab Emirates) Keanu Al Azhari	2	3	9	**1**	**2**	**1**	30	2	2	3	16	**1**	Ret	31	2	5	**1**	4	2	18	3	272
3	(Poland) Maciej Gładysz	5	2	12	12	20	7	4	3	**1**	**1**	**1**	25	Ret	3	15	3	2	5	10	15	7	187
4	(Spain) Juan Cota	19	12	8	24	11	32†	3	6	31	18	9	22	1	1	**1**	2	4	2	16	2	1	186
5	(Mexico) Ernesto Rivera	9	Ret	2	8	1	4	5	4	4	32†	25	6	7	5	20	4	6	Ret	4	4	11	148
6	(United States) James Egozi	Ret	4	Ret	4	5	18	2	5	3	5	11	14	11	10	6	6	5	6	9	5	**2**	143
7	(Belgium) Thomas Strauven	3	**1**	10	3	Ret	3	6	9	12	17	10	8	4	8	5	9	9	3				122
8	(Spain) Lucas Fluxá	**1**	Ret	1	6	6	6	Ret	24	14	28	4	5	5	11	9	8	10	7	25	8	17	118
9	(Australia) Griffin Peebles	13	23	16	9	3	8	10	7	9	8	12	2	**2**	12	4	10	8	8	3	**28**	8	106
10	(Poland) Jan Przyrowski	14	11	3	7	8	5	Ret	8	6	Ret	6	4	Ret	27	10	13	7	9	7	3	9	91
11	(United Kingdom) Nathan Tye	7	28	5	11	Ret	2	8	29†	8	14	2	33†	10	22	19	Ret	Ret	11	6	6	20	72
12	(Thailand) Enzo Tarnvanichkul	12	7	29	15	27†	10	18	20	15	4	5	10	3	6	13	26†	30	17	5	16	4	69
13	(Netherlands) René Lammers	6	8	11	5	Ret	15	11	16	19	6	3	11	8	9	Ret	7	12	20	Ret	7	18	55
14	(Peru) Andrés Cárdenas	11	6	Ret	10	7	16	Ret	11	29	15	17	17	6	7	11	19	25	12	8	9	Ret	28
15	(United Arab Emirates) Matteo Quintarelli	32	9	4	32†	16	25	7	15	7	22	Ret	21	Ret	14	17							26
16	(Australia) Peter Bouzinelos	4	5	Ret	14	Ret	11	19	25	26	21	23	16	Ret	13	34†	11	24	15	Ret	30†	10	21
17	(Hungary) Ádám Hideg	23	16	6	18	14	23	26	10	17	7	13	24	Ret	23	22	17	22	23	24	24	Ret	14
18	(Brazil) Gabriel Gomez	18	13	20	Ret	Ret	13	23	12	11	13	27	13	9	4	14	27†	27	10	Ret	11	13	13
19	(Sri Lanka) Yevan David	15	15	7	13	Ret	31	28	Ret	13	23	21	7	18	18	21	15	31	21				12
20	(Netherlands) Tim Gerhards	33	24	25	Ret	26†	Ret	9	Ret	10	12	15	Ret	12	33†	18	28†	19	24	11	13	6	11
21	(Portugal) Francisco Macedo	10	30	13	16	10	DNS	15	13	16	19	22	9	28†	34†	7	31†	Ret	22	17	12	25	9
22	(Australia) Alex Ninovic													17	Ret	8							4
23	(Denmark) Mikkel Gaarde Pedersen	16	29	27	33†	12	12	27	14	22	11	8	18										3
24	(United Arab Emirates) Adam Al Azhari							14	Ret	21	10	20	20	20	19	12	14	11	14	29	19	19	2
25	(Belgium) Douwe Dedecker	24	20	21	29	9	14	20	Ret	18													1
26	(Spain) Daniel Nogales	34	10	15																			0
27	(Germany) Lenny Ried	27	17	14	23	15	Ret	12	26	20	16	14	15	Ret	21	32	18	15	18	Ret	22	Ret	0
28	(Slovakia) Matúš Ryba	25	25	Ret	19	17	22	Ret	28†	Ret	33†	24	26	15	29	Ret	16	13	19	15	Ret	Ret	0
29	(Austria) Oscar Wurz													13	24	16				27	DNS	22	0
30	(Mexico) Cristian Cantú	28	19	22	25	Ret	28	13	22	25	25	26	28	24	32	29	22	21	Ret	22	26	27	0
31	(Poland) Gustaw Wiśniewski	26	26	31†	31†	13	19																0
32	(United States) Preston Lambert	17	14	30	17	24	17	16	Ret	DNS	20	19	19										0
33	(Netherlands) Reno Francot													16	16	31				18	17	15	0
34	(Brazil) Filippo Fiorentino	31	21	28	21	18	20	22	17	Ret	31	30	32	27	15	28	21	18	27				0
35	(Mexico) Lorenzo Castillo	22	27	18	27	21	21	25	21	23	Ret	28	23	25	17	25	30†	16	25	20	25	Ret	0
36	(United States) Lia Block				28	25	27	17	23	27													0
37	(Colombia) Maximiliano Restrepo	21	32†	19	20	28†	24	31†	Ret	28	24	18	30	19	Ret	23	29†	20	Ret				0
38	(Poland) Wiktor Dobrzański	30	22	26	30†	22	26	21	18	24	29	33	29	23	20	27	23	26	26	23	Ret	24	0
39	(Kyrgyzstan) Kirill Kutskov	20	18	23																			0
40	(United States) Alexander Jacoby				22	19	30	29	27	Ret	Ret	31	31	29†	26	26	Ret	23	28	31†	23	28	0
41	(India) Rehan Hakim	29	31†	24	26	23	29	24	19	30	27	29	Ret										0
42	(Argentina) Gino Trappa													21	25	24							0
43	(Spain) Nerea Martí										26	32	27	22	28	33							0
44	(Spain) Eloi González				Ret	WD	WD							26	30	30							0
45	(Ecuador) Rafael Terán										30	WD	WD							30	DNS	30	0
–	(India) Jaden Pariat	WD	WD	WD																			–
–	(France) Pacôme Weisenburger							WD	WD	WD													–
Guest drivers ineligible to score points
–	(Japan) Hiyu Yamakoshi										9	Ret	12										–
–	(United States) Hudson Schwartz																			13	10	12	–
–	(Israel) Ariel Elkin																12	14	13	14	14	21	–
–	(Lebanon) Christopher El Feghali																20	17	30†	12	29	14	–
–	(United Kingdom) Chase Fernandez																24	Ret	16	26	Ret	16	–
–	(India) Ary Bansal																			19	21	29	–
–	(Australia) Joanne Ciconte																Ret	28	31†	21	20	23	–
–	(Angola) Lorenzo Campos																25	29	29				–
–	(Czech Republic) Teodor Borenstein																			28	27	26	–
–	(Italy) Edoardo Iacobucci																WD	WD	WD				–
–	(Serbia) Andrej Petrović																			WD	WD	WD	–
Pos	Driver	R1	R2	R3	R1	R2	R3	R1	R2	R3	R1	R2	R3	R1	R2	R3	R1	R2	R3	R1	R2	R3	Pts
Pos	Driver	JAR (Spain)			POR (Portugal)			LEC (France)			ARA (Spain)			CRT (Spain)			JER (Spain)			CAT (Spain)			Pts

Colour	Result
Gold	Winner
Silver	Second place
Bronze	Third place
Green	Points classification
Blue	Non-points classification
Blue	Non-classified finish (NC)
Purple	Retired, not classified (Ret)
Red	Did not qualify (DNQ)
Red	Did not pre-qualify (DNPQ)
Black	Disqualified (DSQ)
White	Did not start (DNS)
White	Withdrew (WD)
White	Race cancelled (C)
Blank	Did not practice (DNP)
Blank	Did not arrive (DNA)
Blank	Excluded (EX)

**Bold** – Pole
Italics – Fastest Lap
† — Did not finish but classified
Rookie

=== Teams' standings ===
Pos	Team	Points
1	(Netherlands) KCL by MP Motorsport	458
2	(Netherlands) MP Motorsport	370
3	(Spain) Griffin Core by Campos Racing	230
4	(Spain) Campos Racing	209
5	(Spain) Drivex	191
6	(New Zealand) Rodin Motorsport	143
7	(France) Saintéloc Racing	24
8	(Italy) Cram Motorsport	14
9	(Spain) TC Racing	13
10	(Spain) DXR by Drivex	9
11	(Spain) Monlau Motorsport	8
12	(Spain) Tecnicar Motorsport	2
13	(Spain) GRS Team	1
