= 2024 Formula Winter Series =

Multi-event motor racing championship

The 2024 Formula Winter Series was the second season of the Formula Winter Series. It is a multi-event motor racing championship for open wheel, formula racing cars regulated according to FIA Formula 4 regulations, based in Spain.

== Entry list ==
Team	No.	Driver	Class	Rounds
(Netherlands) MP Motorsport	3	(Australia) Griffin Peebles		All
(Netherlands) MP Motorsport	7	(Poland) Maciej Gładysz	R	All
(Netherlands) MP Motorsport	9	(Netherlands) René Lammers	R	All
(Netherlands) MP Motorsport	21	(Spain) Lucas Fluxá	R	All
(Netherlands) MP Motorsport	46	(Australia) Peter Bouzinelos	R	All
(Netherlands) MP Motorsport	87	(Italy) Mattia Colnaghi	R	1–2
(Netherlands) MP Motorsport	87	(United Arab Emirates) Keanu Al Azhari		3–4
(Spain) Drivex	4	(Spain) Juan Cota		All
(Spain) Drivex	33	(Denmark) Mikkel Gaarde Pedersen		All
(Spain) Drivex	66	(Portugal) Francisco Macedo	R	All
(Spain) Tecnicar - Fórmula de Campeones	5	(Mexico) Lorenzo Castillo		All
(Spain) Tecnicar - Fórmula de Campeones	14	(Poland) Wiktor Dobrzański	R	All
(Spain) Campos Racing	8	(Germany) Carrie Schreiner	F	1, 3
(Spain) Campos Racing	8	(Poland) Jan Przyrowski	R	2, 4
(Spain) Campos Racing	11	(France) Pacôme Weisenburger	R	1–2
(Spain) Campos Racing	11	(Thailand) Enzo Tarnvanichkul	R	3–4
(Spain) Campos Racing	18	(Peru) Andrés Cárdenas		All
(Spain) Campos Racing	44	(Mexico) Ernesto Rivera	R	All
(Spain) Campos Racing	48	(United States) James Egozi		1, 3
(Spain) Campos Racing	48	(United Kingdom) Nathan Tye	R	2, 4
(Spain) Campos Racing	49	(United Kingdom) Finn Harrison		All
(Germany) US Racing	10	(Brazil) Matheus Ferreira		1–2, 4
(Germany) US Racing	12	(Australia) Gianmarco Pradel		All
(Germany) US Racing	19	(Singapore) Kabir Anurag		All
(Germany) US Racing	31	(India) Akshay Bohra		All
(Germany) US Racing	45	(Australia) Jack Beeton		3–4
(Germany) US Racing	71	(Germany) Maxim Rehm	R	All
(Spain) GRS Team	16	(Philippines) Bianca Bustamante	F	1–3
(Spain) GRS Team	16	(India) Jaden Pariat		4
(Spain) GRS Team	28	(Belgium) Douwe Dedecker		All
(Spain) GRS Team	57	(United States) Lia Block	R F	1–3
(Spain) GRS Team	57	(Netherlands) Reno Francot		4
(Switzerland) Maffi Racing	22	(Switzerland) Nathanaël Berreby	R	All
(New Zealand) Rodin Motorsport	23	(United States) Preston Lambert	R	3–4
(New Zealand) Rodin Motorsport	77	(United Kingdom) Bart Harrison	R	1–2
(New Zealand) Rodin Motorsport	77	(United Kingdom) Ella Lloyd	R F	3–4
(New Zealand) Rodin Motorsport	99	(Belgium) Thomas Strauven	R	All
(Switzerland) Jenzer Motorsport	24	(Hungary) Ádám Hideg	R	All
(Switzerland) Jenzer Motorsport	25	(France) Arthur Dorison		All
(Switzerland) Jenzer Motorsport	26	(Switzerland) Enea Frey	R	All
(Switzerland) Jenzer Motorsport	27	(France) Édouard Borgna		All
(Italy) Cram Motorsport	35	(Italy) Flavio Olivieri		All
(Italy) Cram Motorsport	37	(Brazil) Filippo Fiorentino	R	All
(Spain) Monlau Motorsport	50	(Netherlands) Tim Gerhards	R	1–2
(Spain) Monlau Motorsport	50	(Netherlands) Lin Hodenius		3
(Spain) Monlau Motorsport	74	(Germany) Lenny Ried	R	All
(San Marino) AKM Motorsport	52	(Ukraine) Oleksandr Savinkov	R	All
(San Marino) AKM Motorsport	73	(Italy) Emanuele Olivieri	R	1–2

== Race calendar ==
Round		Circuit	Date	Supporting	Map of circuit locations
1	R1	(Spain) Circuito de Jerez, Jerez de la Frontera	9–11 February	GT Winter Series; GT4 Winter Series	2024 Formula Winter Series is located in Spain
1	R2	(Spain) Circuito de Jerez, Jerez de la Frontera	9–11 February	GT Winter Series; GT4 Winter Series	2024 Formula Winter Series is located in Spain
1	R3	(Spain) Circuito de Jerez, Jerez de la Frontera	9–11 February	GT Winter Series; GT4 Winter Series	2024 Formula Winter Series is located in Spain
2	R1	(Spain) Circuit Ricardo Tormo, Cheste	16–18 February	GT Winter Series; GT4 Winter Series	2024 Formula Winter Series is located in Spain
2	R2	(Spain) Circuit Ricardo Tormo, Cheste	16–18 February	GT Winter Series; GT4 Winter Series	2024 Formula Winter Series is located in Spain
2	R3	(Spain) Circuit Ricardo Tormo, Cheste	16–18 February	GT Winter Series; GT4 Winter Series	2024 Formula Winter Series is located in Spain
3	R1	(Spain) MotorLand Aragón, Alcañiz	1–3 March	GT Winter Series; Prototype Winter Series; GT4 Winter Series; Eurocup-3	2024 Formula Winter Series is located in Spain
3	R2	(Spain) MotorLand Aragón, Alcañiz	1–3 March	GT Winter Series; Prototype Winter Series; GT4 Winter Series; Eurocup-3	2024 Formula Winter Series is located in Spain
3	R3	(Spain) MotorLand Aragón, Alcañiz	1–3 March	GT Winter Series; Prototype Winter Series; GT4 Winter Series; Eurocup-3	2024 Formula Winter Series is located in Spain
4	R1	(Spain) Circuit de Barcelona-Catalunya, Montmeló	8–10 March	GT Winter Series; Prototype Winter Series; GT4 Winter Series	2024 Formula Winter Series is located in Spain
4	R2	(Spain) Circuit de Barcelona-Catalunya, Montmeló	8–10 March	GT Winter Series; Prototype Winter Series; GT4 Winter Series	2024 Formula Winter Series is located in Spain
4	R3	(Spain) Circuit de Barcelona-Catalunya, Montmeló	8–10 March	GT Winter Series; Prototype Winter Series; GT4 Winter Series	2024 Formula Winter Series is located in Spain

== Results ==
Round		Circuit	Pole position	Fastest lap	Winning driver	Winning team	Rookie winner	Female Driver Trophy winner
1	R1	(Spain) Circuito de Jerez, Jerez de la Frontera	(Peru) Andrés Cárdenas	(Peru) Andrés Cárdenas	(Peru) Andrés Cárdenas	(Spain) Campos Racing	(Poland) Maciej Gładysz	(Germany) Carrie Schreiner
1	R2	(Spain) Circuito de Jerez, Jerez de la Frontera	(Australia) Griffin Peebles	(Australia) Griffin Peebles	(Australia) Griffin Peebles	(Netherlands) MP Motorsport	(Poland) Maciej Gładysz	(Philippines) Bianca Bustamante
1	R3	(Spain) Circuito de Jerez, Jerez de la Frontera	(Spain) Juan Cota	(Denmark) Mikkel Gaarde Pedersen	(Spain) Juan Cota	(Spain) Drivex	(Poland) Maciej Gładysz	(Germany) Carrie Schreiner
2	R1	(Spain) Circuit Ricardo Tormo, Cheste	(Peru) Andrés Cárdenas (Note: Grid for Race 1 was decided by best times from Friday tests. No points were awarded to driver on pole position.)	(Australia) Griffin Peebles	(Peru) Andrés Cárdenas	(Spain) Campos Racing	(Poland) Maciej Gładysz	(Philippines) Bianca Bustamante
2	R2	(Spain) Circuit Ricardo Tormo, Cheste	(Australia) Griffin Peebles	(Australia) Griffin Peebles	(Australia) Griffin Peebles	(Netherlands) MP Motorsport	(Poland) Maciej Gładysz	(United States) Lia Block
2	R3	(Spain) Circuit Ricardo Tormo, Cheste	(Australia) Griffin Peebles	(Brazil) Matheus Ferreira	(Brazil) Matheus Ferreira	(Germany) US Racing	(Germany) Maxim Rehm	No participants
3	R1	(Spain) MotorLand Aragón, Alcañiz	(United Arab Emirates) Keanu Al Azhari	(United Arab Emirates) Keanu Al Azhari	(United Arab Emirates) Keanu Al Azhari	(Netherlands) MP Motorsport	(Spain) Lucas Fluxá	(United Kingdom) Ella Lloyd
3	R2	(Spain) MotorLand Aragón, Alcañiz	(United Arab Emirates) Keanu Al Azhari	(Singapore) Kabir Anurag	(Belgium) Thomas Strauven	(New Zealand) Rodin Motorsport	(Belgium) Thomas Strauven	(United Kingdom) Ella Lloyd
3	R3	(Spain) MotorLand Aragón, Alcañiz	(United States) James Egozi	(United States) James Egozi	(United States) James Egozi	(Spain) Campos Racing	(Poland) Maciej Gładysz	(Philippines) Bianca Bustamante
4	R1	(Spain) Circuit de Barcelona-Catalunya, Montmeló	(Hungary) Ádám Hideg	Cancelled due to adverse weather conditions				
4	R2	(Spain) Circuit de Barcelona-Catalunya, Montmeló	(Australia) Griffin Peebles	(Australia) Griffin Peebles	(Australia) Griffin Peebles	(Netherlands) MP Motorsport	(Mexico) Ernesto Rivera	No finishers
4	R3	(Spain) Circuit de Barcelona-Catalunya, Montmeló	(United Kingdom) Nathan Tye	(Australia) Griffin Peebles	(Australia) Griffin Peebles	(Netherlands) MP Motorsport	(United Kingdom) Nathan Tye	(United Kingdom) Ella Lloyd

== Championship standings ==
=== Scoring system ===
Points are awarded to the top ten classified drivers, the pole-sitter in races one and three, and the fastest lap holder as follows:

Position	**1st**	**2nd**	**3rd**	**4th**	**5th**	**6th**	**7th**	**8th**	**9th**	**10th**	Pole	FL
Points	25	18	15	12	10	8	6	4	2	1	2	1

=== Drivers' championship ===
Pos	Driver	(Spain) JER			(Spain) CRT			(Spain) ARA			(Spain) CAT			Pts
Pos	Driver	R1	R2	R3	R1	R2	R3	R1	R2	R3	R1	R2	R3	Pts
1	(Australia) Griffin Peebles	2	**1**	9	3	**1**	**2**	10	18	4	C	**1**	1	173
2	(Peru) Andrés Cárdenas	**1**	3	4	**1**	2	5	14	Ret	6	C	2	2	152
3	(Poland) Maciej Gładysz	3	2	5	4	3	31	Ret	8	7	C	4	12	92
4	(Australia) Gianmarco Pradel	6	Ret	13	7	4	6	3	24	3	C	Ret	3	79
5	(Brazil) Matheus Ferreira	4	6	3	6	7	1				C	32†	Ret	75
6	(Spain) Juan Cota	10	8	**1**	2	6	Ret	7	21	Ret	WD	WD	WD	64
7	(United Arab Emirates) Keanu Al Azhari							**1**	**2**	Ret	C	8	6	58
8	(Denmark) Mikkel Gaarde Pedersen	8	5	2	DSQ	31	Ret	13	4	5	C	12	18	55
9	(United States) James Egozi	15	4	8				5	Ret	**1**				54
10	(Australia) Jack Beeton							2	3	2	C	10	30	52
11	(India) Akshay Bohra	5	7	10	5	5	4	32	32	11	C	19	13	49
12	(Belgium) Thomas Strauven	11	13	17	18	22	19	8	1	10	C	21	23	30
13	(Spain) Lucas Fluxá	9	Ret	20	8	Ret	15	4	Ret	Ret	C	5	10	29
14	(Singapore) Kabir Anurag	37	12	18	16	24	8	33	5	DSQ	C	29	5	25
15	(Mexico) Ernesto Rivera	23	34	6	DSQ	Ret	14	Ret	10	26	C	3	19	24
16	(Belgium) Douwe Dedecker	16	17	14	11	15	3	16	11	12	C	9	7	23
17	(United Kingdom) Nathan Tye				9	19	10				C	25	**4**	17
18	(Italy) Mattia Colnaghi	7	19	7	31	8	Ret							16
19	(Netherlands) René Lammers	13	16	16	14	9	18	6	15	8	C	16	20	14
20	(Hungary) Ádám Hideg	18	25	15	20	16	22	12	6	9	**C**	17	Ret	10
21	(Germany) Maxim Rehm	12	11	12	17	10	7	11	9	DSQ	C	14	15	9
22	(Poland) Jan Przyrowski				13	14	11				C	6	21	8
23	(Italy) Flavio Olivieri	14	18	27	34	20	25	9	12	14	C	7	31	8
24	(Netherlands) Lin Hodenius							26	7	16				6
25	(Switzerland) Enea Frey	33	14	31	15	21	17	24	13	15	C	15	8	4
26	(France) Pacôme Weisenburger	34	9	11	12	DNS	13							2
27	(Netherlands) Reno Francot										C	18	9	2
28	(Italy) Emanuele Olivieri	22	22	23	19	23	9							2
29	(Australia) Peter Bouzinelos	19	20	19	10	11	12	31	Ret	Ret	C	20	14	1
30	(United Kingdom) Finn Harrison	26	10	22	21	Ret	21	19	22	21	C	31	16	1
31	(France) Arthur Dorison	20	15	24	24	17	30	18	19	25	C	11	Ret	0
32	(Thailand) Enzo Tarnvanichkul							22	30	30†	C	23	11	0
33	(Netherlands) Tim Gerhards	32	DSQ	21	22	12	16							0
34	(Brazil) Filippo Fiorentino	27	DSQ	28	35	13	24	15	14	13	C	24	29	0
35	(Portugal) Francisco Macedo	30	33	29	32	32	20	34	Ret	27	C	13	17	0
36	(United States) Preston Lambert							23	16	20	C	26	22	0
37	(Ukraine) Oleksandr Savinkov	21	23	Ret	25	18	Ret	17	25	18	C	22	Ret	0
38	(Germany) Lenny Ried	25	27	26	DSQ	27	23	20	17	19	C	27	24	0
39	(Germany) Carrie Schreiner	17	29	25				Ret	WD	DNS				0
40	(Philippines) Bianca Bustamante	35	26	30	33	Ret	WD	35	29	17				0
41	(United Kingdom) Ella Lloyd							21	20	22	C	Ret	26	0
42	(United Kingdom) Bart Harrison	24	21	Ret	23	26	26							0
43	(France) Édouard Borgna	28	24	33	27	29	27	25	23	24	C	Ret	Ret	0
44	(Poland) Wiktor Dobrzański	31	31	34	29	30	29	28	27	23	C	28	25	0
45	(United States) Lia Block	29	30	35	28	25	WD	30	26	29†				0
46	(Mexico) Lorenzo Castillo	38†	28	32	26	DNS	Ret	27	31	Ret	C	Ret	27	0
47	(Switzerland) Nathanaël Berreby	36	32	36	30	28	28	29	28	28	C	30	28	0
–	(India) Jaden Pariat										WD	WD	WD	–

Colour	Result
Gold	Winner
Silver	Second place
Bronze	Third place
Green	Points classification
Blue	Non-points classification
Blue	Non-classified finish (NC)
Purple	Retired, not classified (Ret)
Red	Did not qualify (DNQ)
Red	Did not pre-qualify (DNPQ)
Black	Disqualified (DSQ)
White	Did not start (DNS)
White	Withdrew (WD)
White	Race cancelled (C)
Blank	Did not practice (DNP)
Blank	Did not arrive (DNA)
Blank	Excluded (EX)

**Bold** – Pole

Italics – Fastest Lap

† – Drivers did not finish the race, but were classified as they completed more than 75% of the race distance.

=== Teams' championship ===
Pos	Team	(Spain) JER			(Spain) CRT			(Spain) ARA			(Spain) CAT			Pts
Pos	Team	R1	R2	R3	R1	R2	R3	R1	R2	R3	R1	R2	R3	Pts
1	(Netherlands) MP Motorsport	2	1	5	3	1	2	1	2	4	C	1	1	324
1	(Netherlands) MP Motorsport	3	2	7	4	3	12	4	8	7	C	4	6	324
2	(Germany) US Racing	4	6	3	5	4	1	2	3	2	C	10	3	246
2	(Germany) US Racing	5	7	10	6	5	4	3	5	3	C	14	5	246
3	(Spain) Campos Racing	1	3	4	1	2	5	5	10	1	C	2	2	235
3	(Spain) Campos Racing	15	4	6	9	14	10	14	22	6	C	3	4	235
4	(Spain) Drivex	8	5	1	2	6	15	7	4	5	C	12	17	116
4	(Spain) Drivex	10	8	2	33	31	Ret	13	21	27	C	13	18	116
5	(New Zealand) Rodin Motorsport	11	13	17	18	22	20	8	1	10	C	21	22	30
5	(New Zealand) Rodin Motorsport	24	21	Ret	24	26	26	21	16	20	C	26	23	30
6	(Spain) GRS Team	16	17	14	11	15	3	16	11	12	C	9	7	25
6	(Spain) GRS Team	29	26	30	23	25	WD	30	26	17	C	18	9	25
7	(Switzerland) Jenzer Motorsport	18	14	15	15	16	18	12	6	9	C	11	8	10
7	(Switzerland) Jenzer Motorsport	20	15	24	20	17	22	18	13	15	C	15	Ret	10
8	(Italy) Cram Motorsport	14	18	27	34	13	24	9	12	13	C	7	29	8
8	(Italy) Cram Motorsport	27	DSQ	28	35	20	25	15	14	14	C	24	31	8
9	(Spain) Monlau Motorsport	25	27	21	22	12	17	20	7	16	C	27	24	6
9	(Spain) Monlau Motorsport	32	DSQ	26	DSQ	27	23	26	17	19				6
10	(San Marino) AKM Motorsport	21	22	23	19	18	9	17	25	18	C	22	Ret	2
10	(San Marino) AKM Motorsport	22	23	Ret	26	23	Ret							2
11	(Spain) Tecnicar - Fórmula de Campeones	31	28	32	27	30	29	27	27	23	C	28	25	0
11	(Spain) Tecnicar - Fórmula de Campeones	38†	31	34	30	DNS	Ret	28	31	Ret	C	Ret	27	0
12	(Switzerland) Maffi Racing	36	32	36	31	28	28	29	28	28	C	30	28	0
