= Tim Gerhards =

Dutch racing driver (born 2007)

- Nationality: Netherlands
- Born: 7 July 2007 (age 19) Amsterdam, Netherlands

Formula Regional European Championship career
- Debut season: 2025
- Current team: Saintéloc Racing
- Categorisation: FIA Silver
- Car number: 50
- Starts: 16
- Wins: 0
- Podiums: 0
- Poles: 0
- Fastest laps: 0
- Best finish: 29th in 2025

Previous series
- 2025 2024 2024: FR Europe; Formula Winter Series; F4 Spanish
- Statistics up to date as of 27 October 2025.

Tim Gerhards (born 7 July 2007) is a Dutch racing driver who most recently competed in the 2025 Formula Regional European Championship for Saintéloc Racing.

Gerhards previously competed in the 2024 F4 Spanish Championship with Monlau Motorsport.

== Career ==
=== Karting ===
Gerhards has an impressive karting résumé. In 2019, he gained recognition by winning the BNL Karting Series in the Mini Max category. He then stepped up to the Rotax Junior category in 2020, and came second once again in the BNL series, as he continued to kart around Europe. Gerhards had a breakthrough year in European karting in 2021, as he won the Rotax Max Euro Trophy, as well as making his debut in OKJ karting. Gerhards then made the leap up to senior karting in 2022 at 14 years old, contesting the FIA Karting World Cup. His two-year spell there yielded some strong results ahead of his move up to car racing.

=== Formula 4 ===
After numerous tests, Gerhards was confirmed to be contesting the 2024 Formula Winter Series and the 2024 F4 Spanish Championship with Monlau Motorsport, the team run by Van Amersfoort Racing. He competed in the first two rounds of the Formula Winter Series, and had an unremarkable campaign with a best race result of 12th at the Circuit Ricardo Tormo. He finished in 33rd in the championship standings. Gerhards then joined the F4 Spanish Championship, and scored his first points at the Circuit Paul Ricard in France, with a ninth and tenth-placed finish to his name. He then secured his final points with a sixth-placed finish in the final race of the series. He finished 20th in the standings.

=== Formula Regional ===
On 27 November 2024, the Formula Regional European Championship announced that Gerhards would be competing in the championship for 2025 with Saintéloc Racing. He failed to scored points across the season, and missed the races at Hungary and Zandvoort. He finished 29th in the standings.

== Karting record ==
=== Karting career summary ===
Season	Series	Team	Position
2019	BNL Karting Series - Mini Max		1st
2019	Rotax Max Challenge International Trophy - Mini Max		8th
2020	BNL Karting Series - Rotax Junior		2nd
2020	Rotax Winter Cup - Rotax Junior	SP Motorsport	5th
2020	Rotax Max Challenge International Trophy - Rotax Junior	SP Motorsport	35th
2021	Rotax Max Euro Trophy - Rotax Junior	SP Motorsport	1st
2021	Champions of the Future - OKJ	SP Motorsport	84th
2021	Deutsche Kart Meisterschaft - OKJ	SP Motorsport	13th
2021	CIK-FIA European Championship - OKJ	SP Motorsport	80th
2022	WSK Champions Cup - KZ2	CPB Sport	16th
2022	WSK Super Master Series - KZ2	CPB Sport	56th
2022	CIK-FIA European Championship - KZ2	CPB Sport	19th
2022	CIK-FIA World Cup - KZ2	CPB Sport	29th
2023	South Garda Winter Cup - KZ2	CPB Sport	NC
2023	WSK Champions Cup - KZ2	CPB Sport	35th
2023	WSK Super Master Series - KZ2	CPB Sport	101st
2023	CIK-FIA European Championship - KZ2	CPB Sport	17th
2023	Deutsche Kart Meisterschaft - KZ2		17th
2023	WSK Open Series - KZ2	CPB Sport	78th
2023	CIK-FIA World Cup - KZ2	CPB Sport	37th

== Racing record ==
=== Racing career summary ===
Season	Series	Team	Races	Wins	Poles	F/Laps	Podiums	Points	Position
2024	Formula Winter Series	Monlau Motorsport	6	0	0	0	0	0	33rd
2024	F4 Spanish Championship	Monlau Motorsport	21	0	0	0	0	11	20th
2025	Formula Regional European Championship	Saintéloc Racing	16	0	0	0	0	0	29th
2026	Le Mans Cup - LMP3	More Motorsport	5	0	0	0	0	20	12th

=== Complete Formula Winter Series results ===
(key) (Races in bold indicate pole position; races in italics indicate fastest lap)

Year	Team	1	2	3	4	5	6	7	8	9	10	11	12	DC	Points
2024	Monlau Motorsport	JER; 1; 32	JER; 2 DSQ	JER; 3; 21	CRT; 1; 22	CRT; 2; 12	CRT; 3; 16	ARA; 1	ARA; 2	ARA; 3	CAT; 1	CAT; 2	CAT; 3	33rd	0

=== Complete F4 Spanish Championship results ===
(key) (Races in bold indicate pole position; races in italics indicate fastest lap)

Year	Team	1	2	3	4	5	6	7	8	9	10	11	12	13	14	15	16	17	18	19	20	21	DC	Points
2024	Monlau Motorsport	JAR; 1; 33	JAR; 2; 24	JAR; 3; 25	POR; 1 Ret	POR; 2; 26†	POR; 3 Ret	LEC; 1; 9	LEC; 2 Ret	LEC; 3; 10	ARA; 1; 12	ARA; 2; 15	ARA; 3 Ret	CRT; 1; 12	CRT; 2; 33†	CRT; 3; 18	JER; 1; 28†	JER; 2; 19	JER; 3; 24	CAT; 1; 11	CAT; 2; 13	CAT; 3; 6	20th	11

=== Complete Formula Regional European Championship results ===
(key) (Races in bold indicate pole position) (Races in italics indicate fastest lap)

Year	Team	1	2	3	4	5	6	7	8	9	10	11	12	13	14	15	16	17	18	19	20	DC	Points
2025	Saintéloc Racing	MIS; 1 Ret	MIS; 2 Ret	SPA; 1; 20	SPA; 2; 21	ZAN; 1; 17	ZAN; 2 Ret	HUN; 1	HUN; 2	LEC; 1; 20	LEC; 2; 19	IMO; 1; 20	IMO; 2; 17	RBR; 1; 21	RBR; 2; 23	CAT; 1; 20	CAT; 2; 19	HOC; 1; 23	HOC; 2; 18	MNZ; 1	MNZ; 2	29th	0
