= 2026 4 Hours of Spa-Francorchamps =

Endurance sportscar racing event

Layout of Circuit de Spa-Francorchamps

The 2026 4 Hours of Spa-Francorchamps was an endurance sportscar racing event, held between 21 and 23 August 2026 at Circuit de Spa-Francorchamps in Stavelot, Belgium. It was the fourth of six rounds of the 2026 European Le Mans Series season, and the eleventh running of the event as part of the championship.

== Entry list ==
The provisional entry list was published on 12 August 2026 and consisted of 47 entries across 4 categories – 11 in LMP2, 12 in LMP2 Pro-Am, 10 in LMP3, and 14 in LMGT3.

== Schedule ==
Date	Time (local: CEST)	Event
Friday, 21 August	11:00	Free Practice 1
Friday, 21 August	14:10	Bronze Driver Collective Test
Saturday, 22 August	9:00	Free Practice 2
Saturday, 22 August	12:30	Qualifying – LMGT3
Saturday, 22 August	12:52	Qualifying – LMP3
Saturday, 22 August	13:14	Qualifying – LMP2 Pro-Am
Saturday, 22 August	13:36	Qualifying – LMP2
Sunday, 23 August	13:00	Race

== Qualifying ==
Qualifying started at 12:30 CEST on Saturday, with four sessions of fifteen minutes each, one session for each class.

=== Qualifying results ===
Pole position winners in each class are marked in bold.

Pos	Class	No.	Team	Driver	Time	Gap	Grid
1	**LMP2**	**18**	**(France) IDEC Sport**	**(Italy) Valerio Rinicella**	**2:01.268**	—	1
2	LMP2	43	(Poland) Inter Europol Competition	(France) Tom Dillmann	2:01.422	+0.154	2
3	LMP2	22	(United Kingdom) United Autosports	(Switzerland) Grégoire Saucy	2:01.487	+0.219	3
4	LMP2	34	(Poland) Inter Europol Competition	(France) Reshad de Gerus	2:01.682	+0.414	4
5	LMP2	25	(Portugal) Algarve Pro Racing	(United Kingdom) Jake Hughes	2:01.704	+0.436	5
6	LMP2	29	(France) Forestier Racing by Panis	(France) Esteban Masson	2:01.845	+0.577	6
7	LMP2	10	(United Kingdom) Vector Sport	(Brazil) Pietro Fittipaldi	2:02.111	+0.843	7
8	LMP2	37	(Switzerland) CLX Motorsport	(Denmark) Theodor Jensen	2:02.334	+1.066	8
9	LMP2	9	(Germany) Proton Competition	(Germany) Mike Rockenfeller	2:02.344	+1.076	9
10	LMP2	24	(United Kingdom) Nielsen Racing	(Australia) Jack Doohan	2:02.555	+1.287	10
11	LMP2	28	(France) IDEC Sport	(France) Paul-Loup Chatin	2:02.619	+1.351	11
12	**LMP2 Pro/Am**	**30**	**(France) Duqueine Team**	**(Italy) Giorgio Roda**	**2:03.578**	**+2.310**	12
13	LMP2 Pro/Am	3	(Luxembourg) DKR Engineering	(Belgium) Jean Glorieux	2:04.522	+3.254	13
14	LMP2 Pro/Am	7	(United Kingdom) Vector Sport	(Denmark) Jens Reno Møller	2:04.583	+3.315	14
15	LMP2 Pro/Am	19	(United Arab Emirates) Rossa Racing by Virage	(United States) John Falb	2:04.758	+3.490	15
16	LMP2 Pro/Am	99	(United States) AO by TF	(United States) P. J. Hyett	2:04.868	+3.600	16
17	LMP2 Pro/Am	47	(Switzerland) CLX Motorsport	(Greece) Georgios Kolovos	2:05.209	+3.941	17
18	LMP2 Pro/Am	20	(Portugal) Algarve Pro Racing	(Denmark) Michael Jensen	2:05.603	+4.335	18
19	LMP2 Pro/Am	88	(Germany) Proton Competition	(Austria) Horst Felbermayr Jr.	2:05.921	+4.653	19
20	LMP2 Pro/Am	21	(United Kingdom) United Autosports	(Brazil) Daniel Schneider	2:06.476	+5.208	20
21	LMP2 Pro/Am	83	(Italy) AF Corse	(France) François Perrodo	2:06.858	+5.590	21
22	LMP2 Pro/Am	14	(France) TDS Racing	(United States) Steven Thomas	2:07.186	+5.918	22
23	LMP2 Pro/Am	27	(United Kingdom) Nielsen Racing	(Greece) Kriton Lendoudis	2:10.415	+9.147	23
24	**LMP3**	**85**	**(France) R-ace GP**	**(Luxembourg) Pierre-Alexandre Provost**	**2:12.186**	**+10.918**	24
25	LMP3	4	(Luxembourg) DKR Engineering	(United States) Wyatt Brichacek	2:12.473	+11.205	25
26	LMP3	17	(Switzerland) CLX Motorsport	(France) Louis Iglesias	2:12.908	+11.640	26
27	LMP3	8	(Poland) Team Virage	(Spain) Daniel Nogales	2:13.343	+12.075	27
28	LMP3	35	(France) Ultimate	(Denmark) Sebastian Gravlund	2:13.520	+12.252	28
29	LMP3	5	(Germany) Rinaldi Racing	(Denmark) Mikkel Gaarde Pedersen	2:13.577	+12.309	29
30	LMP3	11	(Italy) EuroInternational	(Netherlands) Max van der Snel	2:13.757	+12.489	30
31	LMP3	31	(France) Racing Spirit of Léman	(Germany) Lenny Ried	2.14.178	+12.910	31
32	LMP3	68	(France) M Racing	(United Kingdom) Alfie Briggs	2:14.685	+13.417	32
33	LMP3	13	(Poland) Inter Europol Competition	(Chinese Taipei) Chun-Ting Chou	2.15.479	+14.211	33
34	**LMGT3**	**59**	**(France) Racing Spirit of Léman**	**(United States) Anthony McIntosh**	**2:20.206**	**+18.938**	34
35	LMGT3	33	(United Kingdom) TF Sport	(United States) Blake McDonald	2:20.826	+19.558	35
36	LMGT3	62	Team Qatar by Iron Lynx	(Qatar) Abdulla Al-Khelaifi	2:21.166	+19.898	36
37	LMGT3	50	(Italy) Richard Mille AF Corse	(Brazil) Custodio Toledo	2:21.956	+20.688	37
38	LMGT3	77	(Germany) Proton Competition	(Australia) Martin Berry	2:22.791	+21.523	38
39	LMGT3	75	(Germany) Proton Competition	(United States) Matt Kurzejewski	2:22.806	+21.538	39
40	LMGT3	74	(Switzerland) Kessel Racing	(United Kingdom) Andrew Gilbert	2:23.554	+22.286	40
41	LMGT3	54	(Denmark) High Class Racing	(Germany) Max Moritz	2:24.483	+23.215	41
42	LMGT3	57	(Switzerland) Kessel Racing	(Japan) Takeshi Kimura	2:25.143	+23.875	42
43	LMGT3	63	(Italy) Iron Lynx	(Zimbabwe) Ameerh Naran	2:26.196	+24.928	43
44	LMGT3	55	(Switzerland) Spirit of Race	(United Kingdom) Duncan Cameron	2:26.362	+25.094	44
45	LMGT3	86	(United Kingdom) GR Racing	(United Kingdom) Michael Wainwright	2:29.183	+27.915	45
46	LMGT3	51	(Italy) AF Corse	(France) Charles-Henri Samani	2.31.772	+30.504	46
47	LMGT3	23	(United Kingdom) United Autosports	(United Kingdom) Michael Birch	2:34.153	+32.885	47

== Notes ==
European Le Mans Series
Previous race: 4 Hours of Imola	2026 season	Next race: 4 Hours of Silverstone
