= Spanish Karting Championship =

Annual kart racing series

The Spanish Karting Championship (Spanish: Campeonato de España de Karting; CEK) is a kart racing series based in Spain. It has taken place in every year since 1970.

== Champions ==
=== ICC/KZ2/KZ ===
Season	Driver
2004	(France) Anthony Puppo
2005	(Spain) Marco Lorenzo
2006	(Spain) Marco Lorenzo
2007	(Italy) Andrea Benedetti
2008	(Spain) Borja Álvarez Luis
2009	(Spain) Borja Álvarez Luis
2010	(Spain) Jon Tanko Yurrebaso
2011	(Portugal) André Serafim
2012	(Spain) Jon Tanko Yurrebaso
2013	(Spain) Álex Palou
2014	(Spain) Jorge Pescador
2015	(Spain) Jorge Pescador
2016	(Spain) Pedro Hiltbrand
2017	(Spain) Enrico Prosperi Oliver
2018	(Spain) Gerard Cebrián Ariza
2019	(Spain) Pedro Hiltbrand
2020	(Spain) Gerard Cebrián Ariza
2021	(Spain) Gerard Cebrián Ariza

=== X30/Senior ===
Season	Driver
2011	(Spain) Javier Rodelas
2012	(Portugal) Henrique Chaves Jr.
2013	(Portugal) Henrique Chaves Jr.
2014	(Spain) Eduardo García Sánchez
2015	(Ukraine) Andriy Pits
2016	(Ukraine) Andriy Pits
2017	(Spain) Alejandro Lahoz López
2018	(Spain) Óscar Palomo
2019	(Spain) Ayrton Fontecha
2020	(Spain) Juan Carlos Hernández Ruiz
2021	(Spain) Daniel Nogales

=== ICA Junior/KF3/KFJ/Junior ===
Season	Driver
2004	(Spain) Jaime Alguersuari
2005	(Spain) Aleix Alcaraz
2006	(Spain) Miki Monrás
2007	(Spain) Marc Otero van der Hout
2008	(Spain) Gerard Barrabeig
2009	(Spain) Gerard Barrabeig
2010	(Spain) Pedro Hiltbrand
2011	(Spain) Álex Palou
2012	(Spain) Álex Palou
2013	(Spain) Guillermo Russo Iglesias
2014	(Spain) Eliseo Martínez Meroño
2015	(Spain) Eliseo Martínez Meroño
2016	(Spain) Carlos Saval Martín
2017	(Spain) Carles Martínez Escrihuela
2018	(Spain) Mari Boya
2019	(Spain) Pepe Martí
2020	(Spain) Santi Vallvé Martín
2021	(Spain) Lucas Fluxá

=== Cadet/Mini ===
Season	Driver
2004	(Spain) Borja Marqués Rabinad
2005	(Spain) Adrián del Río
2006	(Spain) Carlos Gil Contreras
2007	(Spain) Pedro Hiltbrand
2008	(Spain) Diego Rodríguez Riley
2009	(Spain) Fran Rueda
2010	(Spain) Mikel Mostajo Ollo
2011	(Spain) Luis Ramos Pérez
2012	(Andorra) Àlex Machado
2013	(Spain) David Vidales
2014	(Spain) David Vidales
2015	(Spain) Mari Boya
2016	(Spain) Mari Boya
2017	(Spain) Daniel Briz Llull
2018	(Spain) Adrián Malheiro Suñe
2019	(Spain) Adrián Malheiro Suñe
2020	(Spain) Edu Robinson
2021	(Spain) Raúl Zunzarren Pérez

=== Alevin/Academy ===
Season	Driver
2005	(Spain) Carlos Gil Contreras
2006	(Spain) Álex Palou
2007	(Spain) Marc Ferreira
2008	(Spain) Marc Ferreira
2009	(Spain) Eduardo García Sánchez
2010	(Spain) Eliseo Martínez Meroño
2011	(Spain) Eliseo Martínez Meroño
2012	(Spain) Camilo Bobet Trujillo
2013	(Spain) Sami Taoufik
2014	(Spain) Urbeltz Moar Maestro
2015	(Spain) Hugo Belda
2016	(Spain) Santi Vallvé Martín
2017	(Spain) Adrián Malheiro Suñe
2018	(Spain) Lucas Fluxá
2019	(Spain) Hugo Sánchez Freire
2020	(Spain) Javier Broasca
2021	(Spain) Roc Piñera Rusiñol
