= Lucas Fluxá =

Spanish racing driver (born 2008)

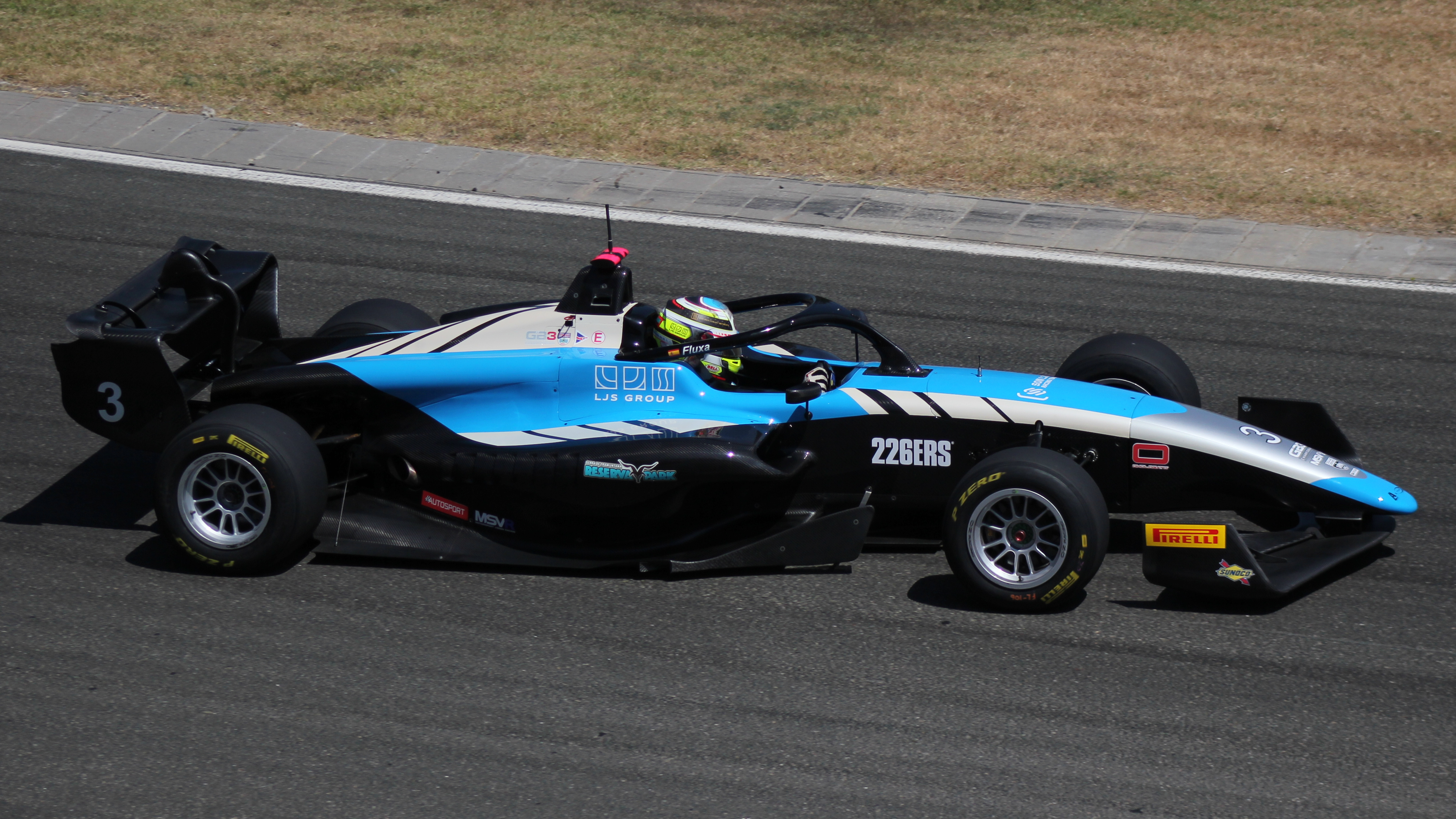
- Fluxá at Hungaroring in 2025
- Nationality: Spain
- Born: Lucas Jack Fluxá Cross; 19 December 2008 (age 17) Mallorca, Balearic Islands, Spain
- Relatives: Miquel Fluxà Rosselló (great uncle); Lorenzo Fluxá (brother); Luna Fluxá (sister)

GB3 Championship career
- Current team: Xcel Motorsport
- Categorisation: FIA Silver
- Car number: 3
- Former teams: Argenti with Prema; Hillspeed
- Starts: 27
- Wins: 1
- Podiums: 3
- Poles: 0
- Fastest laps: 0
- Best finish: 8th in 2025

Previous series
- 2025–26; 2025; 2025; 2024; 2024: Asian Le Mans Series; Eurocup-3; Eurocup-3 Winter; F4 Spanish; Formula Winter Series

Lucas Jack Fluxá Cross (Spanish pronunciation: [ˈlukas fluˈksa ˈkros]; born 19 December 2008) is a Spanish racing driver who currently competes in the GB3 Championship for Xcel Motorsport.

Fluxá is a race-winner in Spanish F4, finishing eighth overall in 2024.

== Career ==
=== Karting ===
Fluxá achieved moderate success during karting. He began competing in Europe in 2017 whilst still competing in Spain and taking a third place in his first year of the Cadet class in the Spanish Karting Championship. He secured his first title in Spain, by winning the Spanish Karting Championship in 2018, in the Alevin class. His first European championship title finally came in 2021, where he won the WSK Final Cup driving for KR Motorsport, in the OKJ class. Fluxá continued to build his consistency the following year, with a best championship result of 4th in the Champions of the Future Winter Series. Fluxá moved up to the OK category in 2023, in preparation for a full season of cars in 2024.

=== Formula 4 (2024) ===
In early 2024, Fluxá announced that he would be stepping up to Formula 4, and he would be driving for MP Motorsport in both the Formula Winter Series, and the F4 Spanish Championship. Fluxà gained experience in the Formula Winter Series, and he finished 13th in the standings with 29 points, and he also finished third amongst the rookies. In Spanish F4, Fluxá made a tremendous start to the season at Jarama, twice finishing on the top step of the podium from three races. He currently sits sixth in the championship standings, after nine races.

=== Formula Regional (2025–) ===
==== 2025 ====
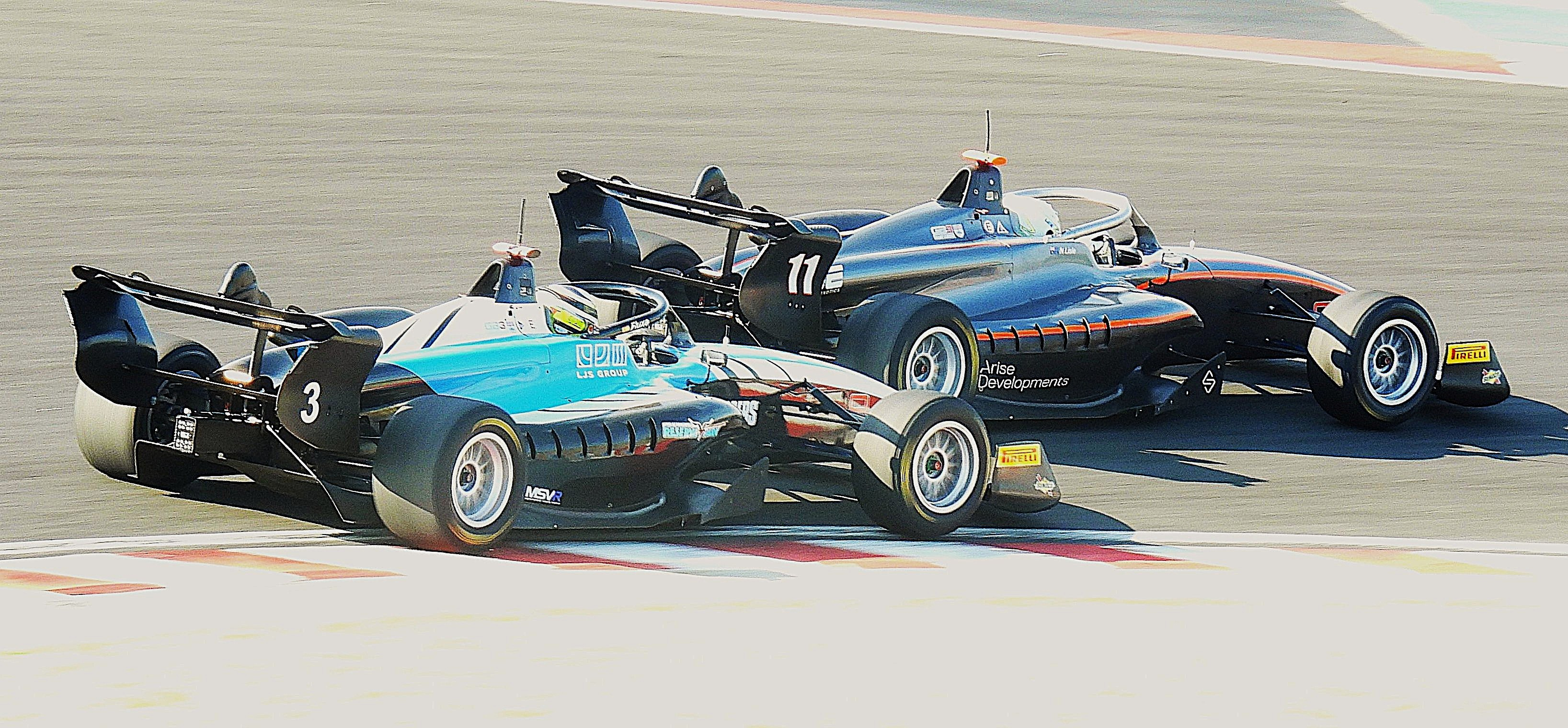
Lucas Fluxá (#3) competing against Noah Lisle (#11) at the Hungaroring during the GB3 weekend

Fluxá moved up to GB3 for 2025, joining Argenti with Prema for his first season in the championship. Prior to the penultimate round in Donington Park, Fluxá switched to Hillspeed to compete with them for the remainder of the season.

Fluxá competed in the final two rounds of the 2025 Eurocup-3 Spanish Winter Championship with Campos Racing. He finished the championship in ninth place with 28 points and a best finish of sixth in the third race at Portimão and first race at Alcañiz.

== Personal life ==
Fluxá is the second of three racing siblings; his older brother Lorenzo competes in the European Le Mans Series, and his younger sister Luna competes in karting. She is a member of the Mercedes Junior Team and Iron Dames.

== Karting record ==
=== Karting career summary ===
| Season | Series | Team | Position |
|---|---|---|---|
| 2017 | Spanish Karting Championship - Alevin | | 6th |
| 2017 | WSK Champions Cup - 60 Mini | Formula K Junior Team | NC |
| 2017 | WSK Super Master Series - 60 Mini | Formula K Junior Team | 120th |
| 2017 | WSK Final Cup - 60 Mini | Chiesa Corse | 42nd |
| 2018 | IAME Winter Cup - X30 Mini | Praga España Motorsport | 2nd |
| 2018 | Spanish Karting Championship - Alevin | | 1st |
| 2018 | IAME Euro Series - X30 Mini | | 12th |
| 2018 | WSK Champions Cup - 60 Mini | Formula K Junior Team | NC |
| 2018 | WSK Super Master Series - 60 Mini | Formula K Junior Team | 58th |
| 2018 | South Garda Winter Cup - Mini Rok | Formula K Junior Team | 22nd |
| 2018 | WSK Final Cup - 60 Mini | Team Driver Racing Kart | 109th |
| 2019 | IAME Winter Cup - X30 Mini | Praga España Motorsport | 11th |
| 2019 | IAME Euro Series - X30 Mini | Praga España Motorsport | 2nd |
| 2019 | Spanish Karting Championship - Cadet | | 3rd |
| 2019 | Trofeo Invernal Ayrton Senna - 60 Mini | Team Driver Racing Kart | 7th |
| 2019 | South Garda Winter Cup - Mini Rok | Team Driver Racing Kart | 23rd |
| 2019 | WSK Super Master Series - 60 Mini | Team Driver Racing Kart | 20th |
| 2019 | Andrea Margutti Trophy - 60 Mini | Team Driver Racing Kart | 18th |
| 2019 | IAME International Final - X30 Mini | | 10th |
| 2019 | WSK Final Cup - 60 Mini | Team Driver Racing Kart | NC |
| 2020 | WSK Champions Cup - OKJ | KR Motorsport | NC |
| 2020 | WSK Super Master Series - OKJ | KR Motorsport | 52nd |
| 2020 | IAME Winter Cup - X30 Junior | Cabo Junior Team | NC |
| 2020 | LeCont Trophy - X30 Junior | Mol Racing | 2nd |
| 2020 | South Garda Winter Cup - OKJ | KR Motorsport | NC |
| 2020 | Champions of the Future - OKJ | KR Motorsport | 47th |
| 2020 | CIK-FIA European Championship - OKJ | Ricky Flynn Motorsport | 85th |
| 2020 | WSK Euro Series - OKJ | Ricky Flynn Motorsport | 30th |
| 2020 | CIK-FIA World Championship - OKJ | Ricky Flynn Motorsport | NC |
| 2020 | International IAME Games - X30 Junior | | 20th |
| 2021 | WSK Champions Cup - OKJ | Kidix | NC |
| 2021 | WSK Super Master Series - OKJ | Kidix | 39th |
| 2021 | WSK Euro Series - OKJ | Kidix | 59th |
| 2021 | Champions of the Future - OKJ | Kidix | 39th |
| 2021 | CIK-FIA European Championship - OKJ | Kidix | 58th |
| 2021 | CIK-FIA Academy Trophy | | 28th |
| 2021 | IAME Euro Series - X30 Junior | Fusion Motorsport | 54th |
| 2021 | IAME Warriors Final - X30 Junior | Team Driver Racing Kart | 16th |
| 2021 | International IAME Games - X30 Junior | AC Motorsport | 6th |
| 2021 | WSK Final Cup - OKJ | KR Motorsport | 1st |
| 2022 | WSK Super Master Series - OKJ | KR Motorsport | 5th |
| 2022 | Champions of the Future Winter Series - OKJ | KR Motorsport | 4th |
| 2022 | Champions of the Future - OKJ | KR Motorsport | 7th |
| 2022 | CIK-FIA European Championship - OKJ | KR Motorsport | 31st |
| 2022 | WSK Euro Series - OKJ | KR Motorsport | 84th |
| 2022 | CIK-FIA World Championship - OKJ | KR Motorsport | 12th |
| 2022 | WSK Open Cup - OK | KR Motorsport | 16th |
| 2022 | WSK Final Cup - OK | KR Motorsport | 25th |
| 2023 | IAME Winter Cup - X30 Senior | KR Motorsport | 31st |
| 2023 | WSK Super Master Series - OK | KR Motorsport | 78th |
| 2023 | Champions of the Future - OK | KR Motorsport | 69th |
| 2023 | CIK-FIA European Championship - OK | KR Motorsport | 78th |

== Racing record ==
=== Racing career summary ===
| Season | Series | Team | Races | Wins | Poles | F/Laps | Podiums | Points | Position |
|---|---|---|---|---|---|---|---|---|---|
| 2024 | Formula Winter Series | MP Motorsport | 11 | 0 | 0 | 0 | 0 | 29 | 13th |
| 2024 | F4 Spanish Championship | KCL by MP Motorsport | 21 | 2 | 1 | 0 | 2 | 118 | 8th |
| 2025 | Eurocup-3 Spanish Winter Championship | Campos Racing | 3 | 0 | 0 | 0 | 0 | 28 | 9th |
| 2025 | Eurocup-3 Spanish Winter Championship | Griffin Core by Campos | 2 | 0 | 0 | 0 | 0 | 28 | 9th |
| 2025 | GB3 Championship | Argenti with Prema | 18 | 0 | 0 | 0 | 0 | 258 | 8th |
| 2025 | GB3 Championship | Hillspeed | 6 | 1 | 0 | 0 | 1 | 258 | 8th |
| 2025 | Eurocup-3 | Drivex | 2 | 0 | 0 | 0 | 0 | 0 | 33rd |
| 2025–26 | Asian Le Mans Series - LMP3 | Bretton Racing | 4 | 0 | 0 | 0 | 0 | 20 | 14th |
| 2026 | GB3 Championship | Xcel Motorsport | 23 | 1 | 0 | 0 | 8 | 398 | **3rd** |
| 2026 | Le Mans Cup - LMP3 | Brutal Fish by Campos | 6 | 0 | 0 | 0 | 3 | 77 | **3rd** |

^{*} Season still in progress.

=== Complete Formula Winter Series results ===
(key) (Races in bold indicate pole position; races in italics indicate fastest lap)

| Year | Team | 1 | 2 | 3 | 4 | 5 | 6 | 7 | 8 | 9 | 10 | 11 | 12 | DC | Points |
|---|---|---|---|---|---|---|---|---|---|---|---|---|---|---|---|
| 2024 | MP Motorsport | JER; 1; 9 | JER; 2 Ret | JER; 3; 20 | CRT; 1; 8 | CRT; 2 Ret | CRT; 3; 15 | ARA; 1; 4 | ARA; 2 Ret | ARA; 3 Ret | CAT; 2 C | CAT; 2; 5 | CAT; 3; 10 | 13th | 29 |

=== Complete F4 Spanish Championship results ===
(key) (Races in bold indicate pole position; races in italics indicate fastest lap)

| Year | Team | 1 | 2 | 3 | 4 | 5 | 6 | 7 | 8 | 9 | 10 | 11 | 12 | 13 | 14 | 15 | 16 | 17 | 18 | 19 | 20 | 21 | DC | Points |
|---|---|---|---|---|---|---|---|---|---|---|---|---|---|---|---|---|---|---|---|---|---|---|---|---|
| 2024 | KCL by MP Motorsport | **JAR**; **1**; 1 | JAR; 2 Ret | JAR; 3; 1 | POR; 1; 6 | POR; 2; 6 | POR; 3; 6 | LEC; 1 Ret | LEC; 2; 24 | LEC; 3; 14 | ARA; 1; 28 | ARA; 2; 4 | ARA; 3; 5 | CRT; 1; 5 | CRT; 2; 11 | CRT; 3; 9 | JER; 1; 8 | JER; 2; 10 | JER; 3; 7 | CAT; 1; 25 | CAT; 2; 8 | CAT; 3; 17 | 8th | 118 |

=== Complete Eurocup-3 Spanish Winter Championship results ===
(key) (Races in bold indicate pole position) (Races in italics indicate fastest lap)

| Year | Team | 1 | 2 | 3 | 4 | 5 | 6 | 7 | 8 | DC | Points |
|---|---|---|---|---|---|---|---|---|---|---|---|
| 2025 | Campos Racing | JER; 1 | JER; 2 | JER; 3 | POR; 1; 7 | POR; 2; 21 | POR; 3; 6 | | | 9th | 28 |
| 2025 | Griffin Core by Campos | | | | | | | ARA; 1; 6 | ARA; 2; 9 | 9th | 28 |

=== Complete GB3 Championship results ===
(key) (Races in bold indicate pole position) (Races in italics indicate fastest lap)

| Year | Team | 1 | 2 | 3 | 4 | 5 | 6 | 7 | 8 | 9 | 10 | 11 | 12 | 13 | 14 | 15 | 16 | 17 | 18 | 19 | 20 | 21 | 22 | 23 | 24 | DC | Points |
|---|---|---|---|---|---|---|---|---|---|---|---|---|---|---|---|---|---|---|---|---|---|---|---|---|---|---|---|
| 2025 | Argenti with Prema | SIL1; 1; 14 | SIL1; 2; 8 | SIL1; 3; 5^{9} | ZAN; 1; 12 | ZAN; 2; 12 | ZAN; 3; 12^{2} | SPA; 1; 12 | SPA; 2; 18 | SPA; 3; 8^{11} | HUN; 1; 11 | HUN; 2; 11 | HUN; 3; 12^{2} | SIL2; 1; 10 | SIL2; 2 Ret | SIL2; 3; 13^{9} | BRH; 1; 16 | BRH; 2; 13 | BRH; 3; 9^{7} | | | | | | | 8th | 258 |
| 2025 | Hillspeed | | | | | | | | | | | | | | | | | | | DON; 1; 5 | DON; 2; 5 | DON; 3; 1 | MNZ; 1; 8 | MNZ; 2; 13 | MNZ; 3; 8 | 8th | 258 |
| 2026 | Xcel Motorsport | SIL1; 1; 12 | SIL1; 2; 3 | SIL1; 3; 3^{2} | SPA; 1; 5 | SPA; 2; 8 | SPA; 3 C | HUN; 1; 5 | HUN; 2; 3 | HUN; 3; 2^{5} | RBR; 1; 2 | RBR; 2; 2 | RBR; 3; 7^{2} | SIL2; 1; 17 | SIL2; 2; 3 | SIL2; 3; 9^{1} | DON; 1; 5 | DON; 2; 4 | DON; 3; 4^{3} | BRH; 1; 9 | BRH; 2; 7 | BRH; 3; 1^{3} | CAT; 1; 3 | CAT; 2; 5 | CAT; 3; 20 | 3rd | 398 |

* Season still in progress.

=== Complete Eurocup-3 results ===
(key) (Races in bold indicate pole position) (Races in italics indicate fastest lap)

| Year | Team | 1 | 2 | 3 | 4 | 5 | 6 | 7 | 8 | 9 | 10 | 11 | 12 | 13 | 14 | 15 | 16 | 17 | 18 | DC | Points |
|---|---|---|---|---|---|---|---|---|---|---|---|---|---|---|---|---|---|---|---|---|---|
| 2025 | Drivex | RBR; 1 | RBR; 2 | POR; 1 | POR; SR | POR; 2 | LEC; 1 | LEC; SR | LEC; 2 | MNZ; 1 | MNZ; 2 | ASS; 1; 16 | ASS; 2; 15 | SPA; 1 | SPA; 2 | JER; 1 | JER; 2 | CAT; 1 | CAT; 2 | 33rd | 0 |

=== Complete Le Mans Cup results ===
(key) (Races in bold indicate pole position; results in italics indicate fastest lap)

| Year | Entrant | Class | Chassis | 1 | 2 | 3 | 4 | 5 | 6 | Rank | Points |
|---|---|---|---|---|---|---|---|---|---|---|---|
| 2026 | Brutal Fish by Campos | LMP3 | Ligier JS P325 | BAR; 4 | LEC; 3 | LMS; 3 | SPA; Ret | SIL; 4 | POR; 3 | 3rd | 77 |

^{*} Season still in progress.
