= Griffin Peebles =

Australian racing driver (born 2008)

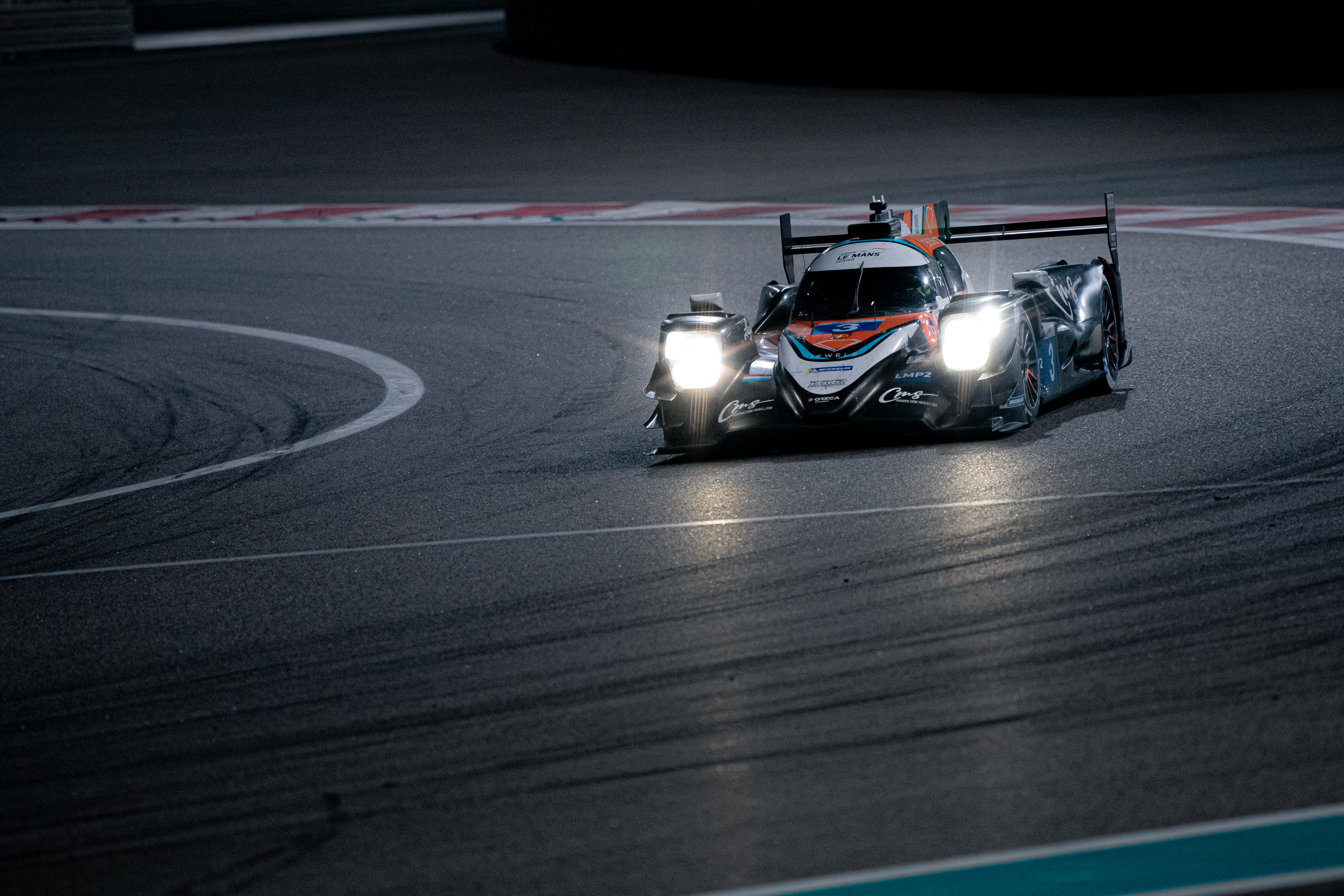
- Peebles in the Asian Le Mans Series at Yas Marina Circuit in 2026
- Nationality: (Australia) Australian
- Born: 29 February 2008 (age 18) Shanghai, China
- Categorisation: FIA Silver

Previous series
- 2023–2024 2024 2023 2023 2023: F4 Spanish Championship; Formula Winter Series; F4 British Championship; Italian F4 Championship; Euro 4 Championship

Championship titles
- 2024 2026: Formula Winter Series; European Le Mans Series - LMP2

Griffin Peebles (born 29 February 2008) is an Australian racing driver who is competing in the LMP2 class of the Asian Le Mans Series for DKR Engineering.

In 2025, Peebles competed in LMP3 classes of the European Le Mans Series and Le Mans Cup for WTM by Rinaldi Racing, winning the opening Barcelona round and finishing second in the final three rounds to finish third in the Le Mans Cup LMP3 Pro-AM Drivers Championship and helping Rinaldi Racing finish second in the Teams Championship.

Peebles previously raced in Formula 4 single-seaters, notably winning the Formula Winter Series in 2024 for MP Motorsport.

== Early career ==
=== 2023 ===
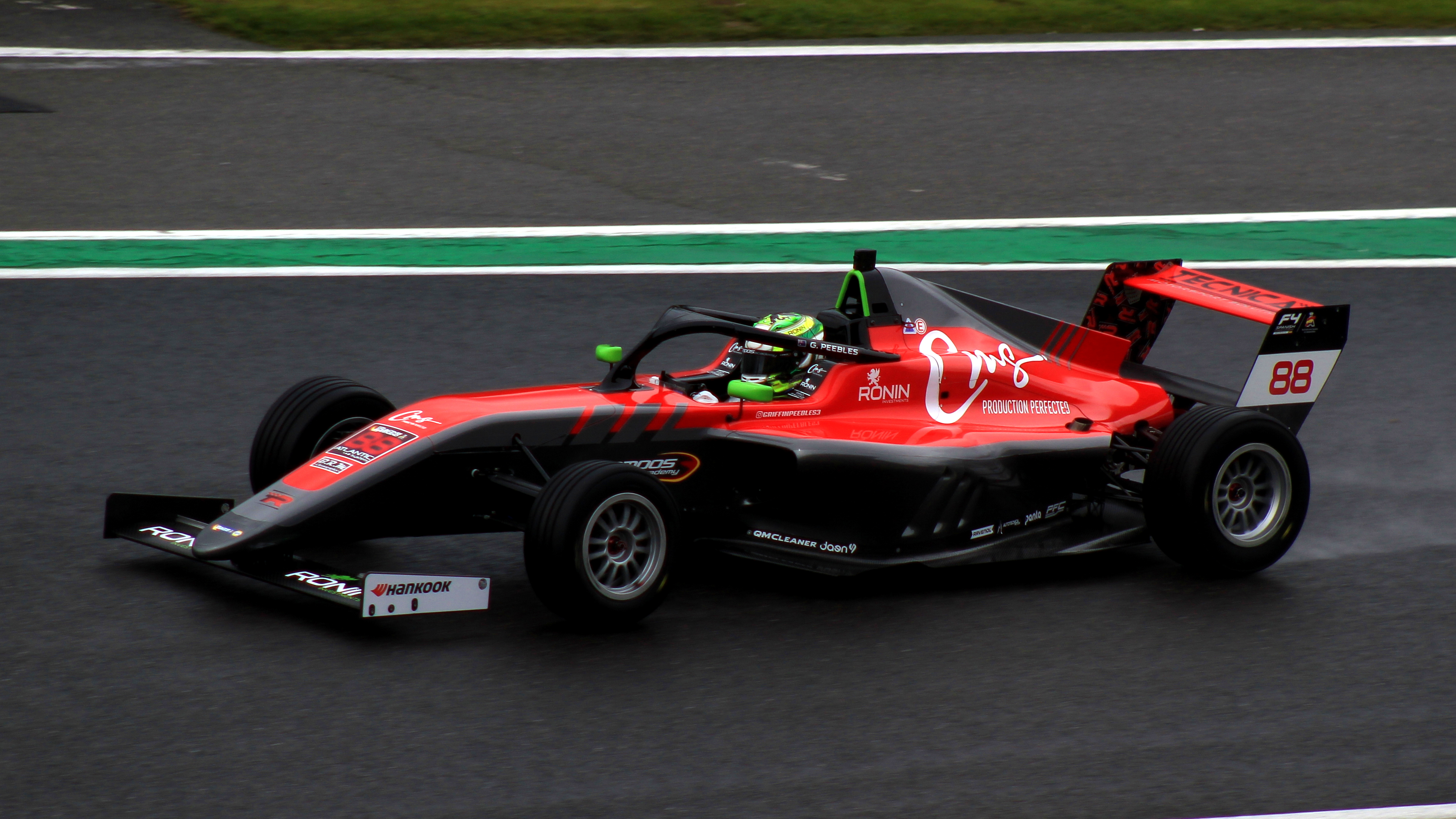
Peebles racing for Tecnicar at Spa-Francorchamps in Spanish F4 in 2023.

Having learned racing craft in karting, Peebles made his debut in single seaters, at the age of 15, with Tecnicar Motorsport Solutions in the 2023 F4 Spanish Championship. He went on to achieve one points finish at the first race of the Circuit of Jerez en route to a 25th-place points finish at season's end. During 2023, Peebles also competed part-time in the F4 British, Italian F4 and Euro 4 Championships. In those part time apperarances, Peebles took a best result of fourth in the British F4 round at Knockhill in race three.

=== 2024 ===
Peebles then moved to MP Motorsport to compete in the 2024 Formula Winter Series and 2024 F4 Spanish Championships. In the former, he got his first podium in the first race of the season at the Circuit of Jerez, where he also achieved his first win of the season in the second race of the weekend. At the next round on the Circuit Ricardo Tormo, Peebles appeared on the podium in all 3 races taking the Championship lead from Cárdenas. The third round of the season at MotorLand Aragón proved to be a more difficult one, as Peebles only scored points twice with a best result of fourth in race 3 of the weekend while new teammate Keanu Al Azhari managed to get a win and second place in his first races of the season. Peebles still kept the lead going into the last weekend of the season. Going into the race weekend at the Circuit de Barcelona-Catalunya, the first race was cancelled due to adverse weather conditions. The second and third race went ahead, both races were won by Peebles claiming the title in the last race against Andrés Cárdenas who drove for Campos Racing.

In the Spanish championship, Peebles took his first podium of the season in race two of the second round of the season at Algarve by finishing third. Two rounds later, Peebles was back on the podium as he finished second in race three in Aragón, before finishing second in the following race at Valencia, from which he started on pole. Peebles then rounded off the season with a third-place finish in race one of the season-ending round at Barcelona as he ended his sophomore season in single-seaters with a ninth-place points finish. During 2024, Peebles also represented Australia in the Formula 4 Cup of the FIA Motorsport Games, finishing fourth.

== Prototype career ==
Having tested LMP3 machinery in late 2024, Peebles made his LMP3 debut with Bretton Racing in the 2024–25 Asian Le Mans Series, racing in the final two rounds at Dubai and Yas Marina. Peebles won on debut in race one at Dubai and finished the other three races on the podium to secure fifth in the LMP3 driver standings helping Bretton Racing secure their first LMP3 teams championship.

Peebles then signed with Rinaldi Racing to compete in the LMP3 classes of the European Le Mans Series and Le Mans Cup.

== Racing record ==
=== Racing career summary ===
Season	Series	Team	Races	Wins	Poles	F/Laps	Podiums	Points	Position
2023	F4 Spanish Championship	Tecnicar - Fórmula de Campeones	21	0	0	0	0	1	25th
2023	F4 British Championship	Phynsis by Argenti	6	0	0	0	0	15	22nd
2023	Italian F4 Championship	AKM Motorsport	3	0	0	0	0	0	33rd
2023	Italian F4 Championship	Jenzer Motorsport	3	0	0	0	0	0	33rd
2023	Euro 4 Championship	BVM Racing	6	0	0	0	0	0	25th
2024	Formula Winter Series	MP Motorsport	11	4	4	5	7	173	**1st**
2024	F4 Spanish Championship	MP Motorsport	21	0	2	1	4	106	9th
2024	FIA Motorsport Games Formula 4 Cup	Team Australia	2	0	0	0	0	N/A	4th
2024–25	Asian Le Mans Series - LMP3	Bretton Racing	4	1	0	4	4	76	5th
2025	European Le Mans Series - LMP3	WTM by Rinaldi Racing	6	0	1	0	0	29	12th
2025	Le Mans Cup - LMP3	WTM by Rinaldi Racing	2	0	0	0	0	0	NC†
2025	Le Mans Cup - LMP3 Pro-Am	Rinaldi Racing	5	1	0	1	4	81	**3rd**
2025–26	Asian Le Mans Series - LMP2	DKR Engineering	6	1	0	0	1	59	4th
2026	European Le Mans Series - LMP2	United Autosports	6	2	1	1	5	110	**1st**
2027	IMSA SportsCar Championship - LMP2	Tower Motorsports	-	-	-	-	-	-	-

=== Complete F4 Spanish Championship results ===
(key) (Races in bold indicate pole position) (Races in italics indicate fastest lap)

Year	Team	1	2	3	4	5	6	7	8	9	10	11	12	13	14	15	16	17	18	19	20	21	Pos	Points
2023	Tecnicar - Fórmula de Campeones	SPA; 1; 17	SPA; 2; 17	SPA; 3; 17	ARA; 1; 15	ARA; 2; 13	ARA; 3; 15	NAV; 1; 18	NAV; 2; 18	NAV; 3; 20	JER; 1; 10	JER; 2; 14	JER; 3; 25	EST; 1; 26	EST; 2; 17	EST; 3; 16	CRT; 1; 26	CRT; 2; 27	CRT; 3; 16	CAT; 1; 23	CAT; 2; 16	CAT; 3; 13	25th	1
2024	MP Motorsport	JAR; 1; 13	JAR; 2; 23	JAR; 3; 16	POR; 1; 9	POR; 2; 3	POR; 3; 8	LEC; 1; 10	LEC; 2; 7	LEC; 3; 9	ARA; 1; 7	ARA; 2; 12	ARA; 3; 2	**CRT**; 1; 2	CRT; 2; 12	CRT; 3; 4	JER; 1; 10	JER; 2; 8	JER; 3; 8	CAT; 1; 3	**CAT**; 2; 28	CAT; 3; 8	9th	106

=== Complete Formula Winter Series results ===
(key) (Races in bold indicate pole position) (Races in italics indicate fastest lap)

Year	Team	1	2	3	4	5	6	7	8	9	10	11	12	Pos	Points
2024	MP Motorsport	JER; 1; 2	JER; 2; 1	JER; 3; 9	CRT; 1; 3	**CRT**; 2; 1	**CRT**; 3; 2	ARA; 1; 10	ARA; 2; 18	ARA; 3; 4	CAT; 1 C	**CAT**; 2; 1	CAT; 3; 1	1st	173

=== Complete Asian Le Mans Series results ===
(key) (Races in bold indicate pole position) (Races in italics indicate fastest lap)

Year	Team	Class	Car	Engine	1	2	3	4	5	6	DC	Points
2024–25	Bretton Racing	LMP3	Ligier JS P320	Nissan VK56DE 5.6 L V8	SEP; 1	SEP; 2	DUB; 1; 1	DUB; 2; 2	ABU; 1; 2	ABU; 2; 3	5th	76
2025–26	DKR Engineering	LMP2	Oreca 07	Gibson GK428 4.2 L V8	SEP; 1; 11	SEP; 2; 4	DUB; 1; 8	DUB; 2; 7	ABU; 1; 4	ABU; 2; 1	4th	59

=== Complete Le Mans Cup results ===
(key) (Races in bold indicate pole position; results in italics indicate fastest lap)

Year	Entrant	Class	Chassis	1	2	3	4	5	6	7	Rank	Points
2025	Rinaldi Racing	LMP3 Pro-Am	Ligier JS P325	CAT; 1	LEC; 9			SPA; 2	SIL; 2	ALG; 2	3rd	81
2025	WTM by Rinaldi Racing	LMP3	Ligier JS P325			LMS; 1 Ret	LMS; 2; 8				NC†	0

=== Complete European Le Mans Series results ===
(key) (Races in bold indicate pole position; results in italics indicate fastest lap)

Year	Entrant	Class	Chassis	Engine	1	2	3	4	5	6	Rank	Points
2025	WTM by Rinaldi Racing	LMP3	Duqueine D09	Toyota V35A-FTS 3.5 L V6	CAT; 6	LEC; Ret	IMO; 4	SPA; 7	**SIL**; Ret	ALG; 9	12th	29
2026	United Autosports	LMP2	Oreca 07	Gibson GK428 4.2 L V8	CAT; 3	LEC; 1	IMO; 2	SPA; 4	SIL; 3	**ALG**; 1	1st	110

=== Complete European Le Mans Series results ===
(key) (Races in bold indicate pole position; results in italics indicate fastest lap)

Year	Entrant	Class	Chassis	Engine	1	2	3	4	5	6	7	8	9	10	11	Rank	Points
2027	Tower Motorsports	LMP2	Oreca 07	Gibson GK428 V8 engine	DAY	SEB	LBH	LGA	DET	WGL	MOS	ELK	VIR	IMS	PET	-*	0*

^{*} Season still in progress.
