= Enzo Deligny =

French and Chinese racing driver (born 2005)

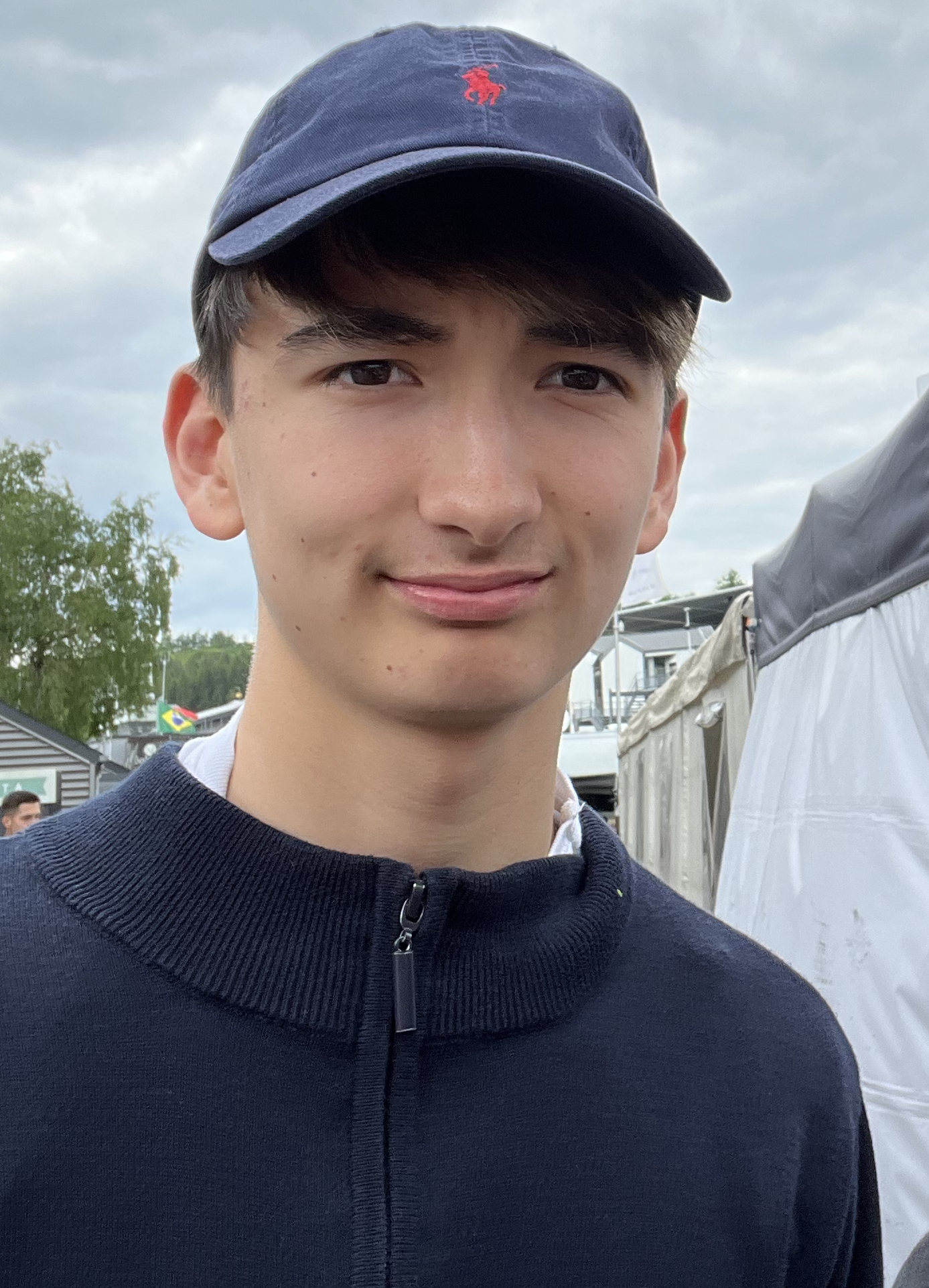
- Deligny in 2025
- Nationality: (France) French (China) Chinese via dual nationality
- Born: 17 April 2008 (age 18) Shanghai, China

FIA Formula 3 Championship career
- Debut season: 2026
- Current team: Van Amersfoort Racing
- Car number: 15
- Starts: 19
- Wins: 0
- Podiums: 1
- Poles: 0
- Fastest laps: 0
- Best finish: 16th in 2026

Previous series
- 2025; 2024–2025; 2024; 2023; 2023; 2023: FR Middle East; FR European; F4 UAE; Euro 4; Italian F4; F4 Spanish
- Statistics up to date as of 15 September 2026.

Enzo Deligny (born 17 April 2008) is a French and Chinese racing driver who is set to compete in the FIA Formula 3 Championship for Van Amersfoort Racing.

A member of the Red Bull Junior Team from 2023 to 2024, Deligny raced in the 2023 F4 Spanish Championship, finishing fourth overall. He progressed to Formula Regional European in 2024, finishing third in 2025 with R-ace GP.

== Personal life ==
Deligny was born in Shanghai to a Chinese mother, Yan Sha, and a French father, Arnaud Deligny, who formerly raced in the Chinese Volkswagen Polo GTi Cup, which he won in 2013 and 2014. Enzo has one younger sister, Elisa Deligny. Enzo speaks French, Mandarin Chinese, and English fluently and has a good knowledge of Italian. As of 2023 he resides in Milan, Italy.

== Career ==
=== Karting ===
At the age of five, Deligny started karting at the track located inside the Shanghai International Circuit. He won his first race at age 6, the Rotax Max Asia in Shanghai on a SodiKart chassis. Having moved to Los Angeles in 2015, the Frenchman began to race in American championships, winning the Challenge of the Americas and the SKUSA Spring Nationals four years after the fact, as well as finishing second in the SKUSA SuperNationals in the Mini category. In 2020, Deligny switched over to the European karting scene, managing to end up as the runner-up in the ROK Cup International Final.

In 2021, Deligny started racing for the Parolin Motorsport team, competing in various European series in the OK Junior category, which included the CIK-FIA European Championship. The following year, Deligny remained with Parolin, this time progressing to the OK Senior class. This move yielded immediate success, as he would take his first victory at age 13 (one of the three drivers to ever win a race in senior at 13) at the final round of the WSK Super Master Series. From there, he would impress further, winning races in the WSK Euro Series, finishing second overall, and taking a podium at Zuera in the European Championship, as well as qualifying in third for the season finale at Franciacorta, where he would end up fourth in the standings. Speaking about his final year in karting, Deligny described it as having been "positive", whilst conceding that he "could have been better".

=== Formula 4 ===
==== 2023 ====
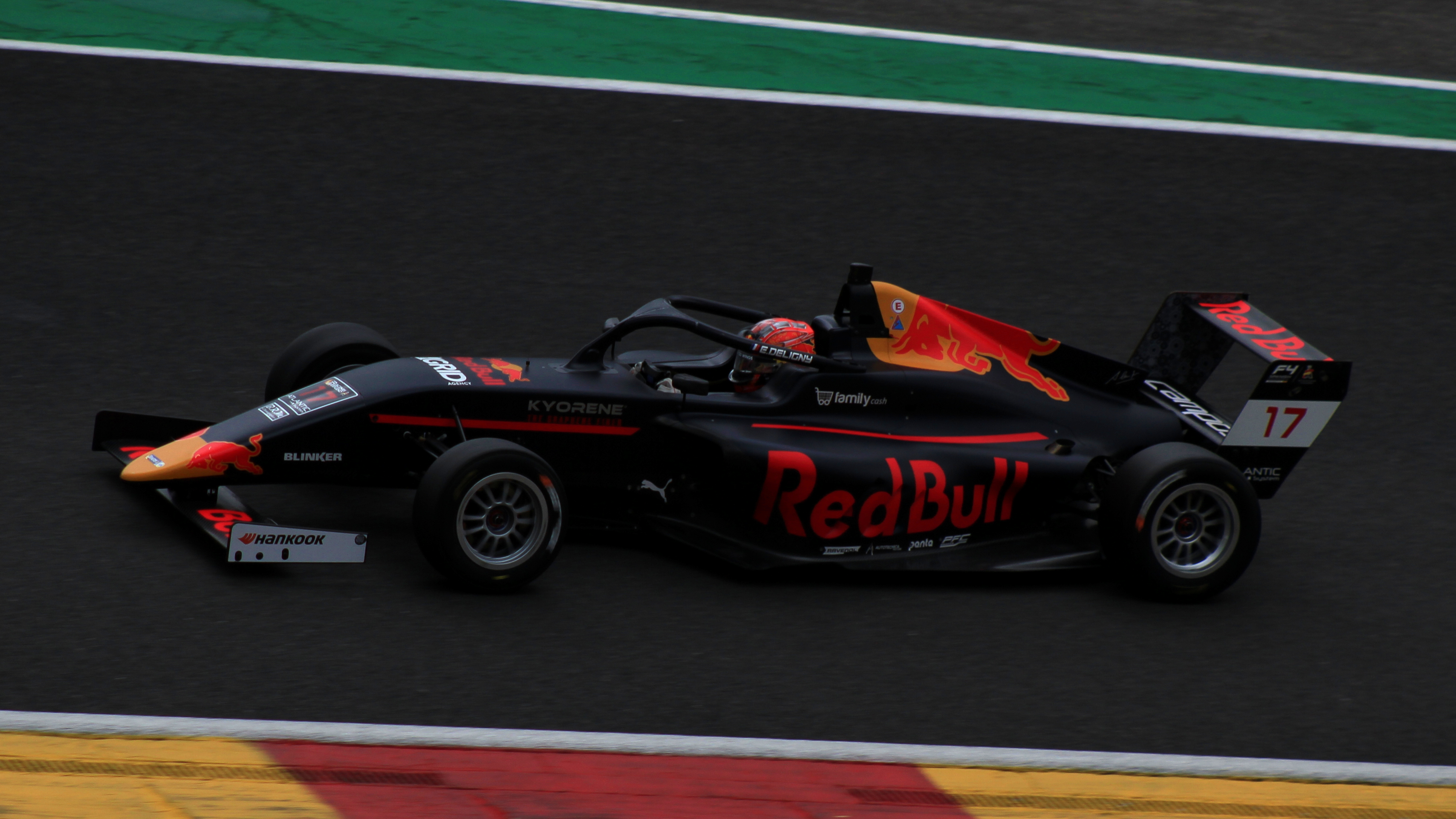
Enzo Deligny during the 2023 Spanish F4 race in Belgium

Deligny made his single-seater debut in 2023, competing in the F4 Spanish Championship for Campos Racing, with previous year's champion Nikola Tsolov having recommended the team to the Frenchman. Deligny started with a fourth place in Spa-Francorchamps, and did not take long to secure his first win at Aragón. He took two second places in the two remaining races. Deligny scored consistent podiums in the next three rounds, including another victory in Estoril, boosting his title hopes. However, he only netted one more podium in the final two rounds, which came in Barcelona. That round was also overshadowed by a disqualification for Deligny after he aggressively forced another driver off the track on the run down to turn 1 on the opening lap. Nevertheless, Deligny wrapped up the season fourth in the standings with 240 points, securing two wins and ten podiums.

Deligny also took part in two rounds in the Italian F4 Championship with AKM Motorsport. He finished in the points on all races during the Imola opener and a further ninth place in Paul Ricard placed him 22nd in the standings with eight points. He also competed in the Euro 4 Championship with the team for one round in Monza, taking a tenth place.

==== 2024 ====
Deligny joined the 2024 Formula 4 UAE Championship for the final three rounds with R-ace GP. He earned two podiums throughout his three-round stint, including winning the second race during the final round in Dubai. Despite missing the opening two rounds, Deligny ranked eighth in the overall championship.

=== Formula Regional ===
==== 2024 ====
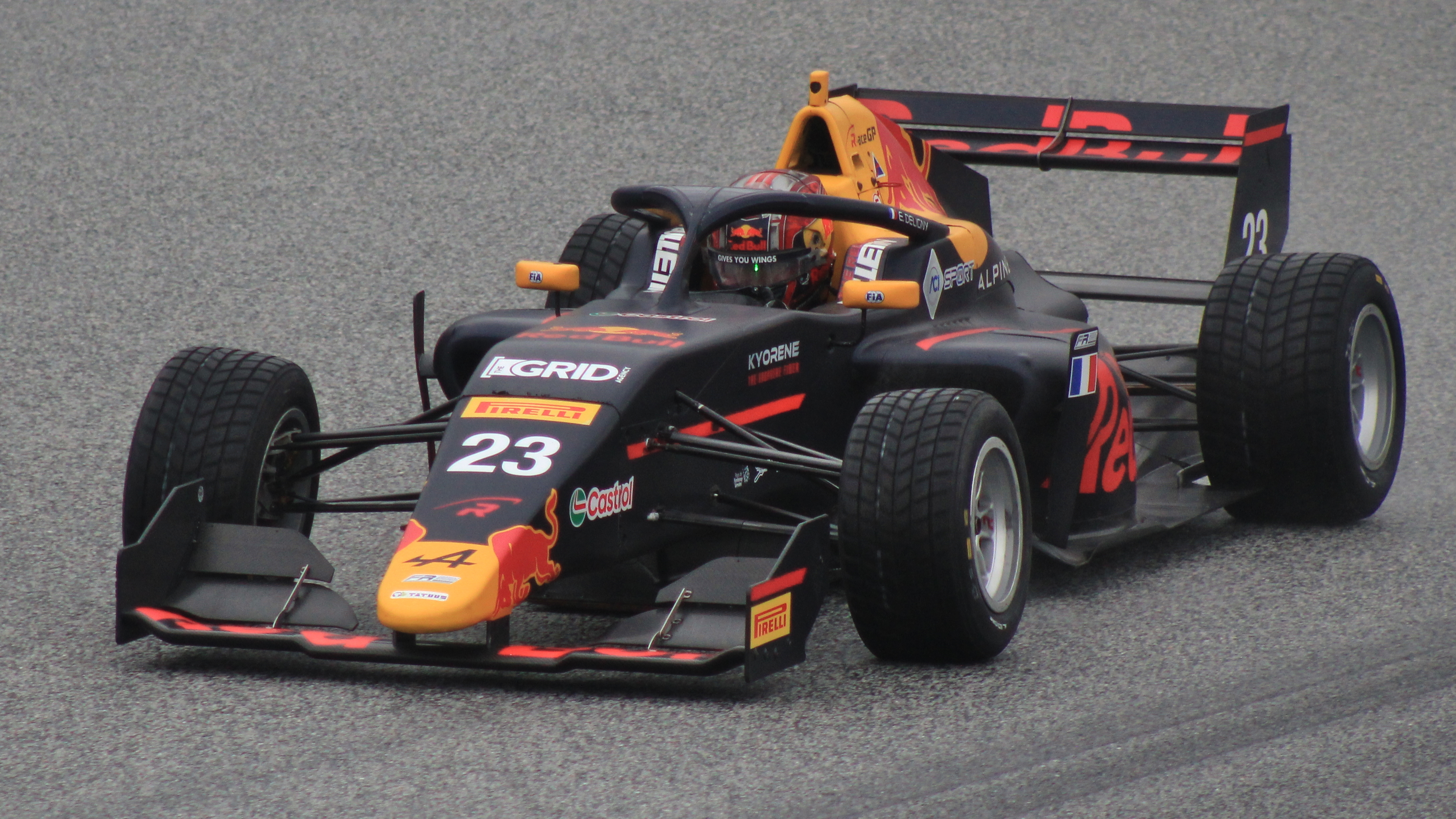
Deligny driving at the Red Bull Ring during the 2024 Formula Regional European Championship

For 2024, Deligny stepped up to the Formula Regional European Championship with R-ace GP, alongside teammates Tuukka Taponen and Zachary David. He had a quiet season and netted regular points finishes; with a best finish of fourth, he finished 12th in the overall standings.

Deligny also competed in the Macau Grand Prix with R-ace GP. He impressed in his maiden outing at the circuit, finishing fifth in the qualification race and improving the next day to fourth in the main race.

==== 2025 ====
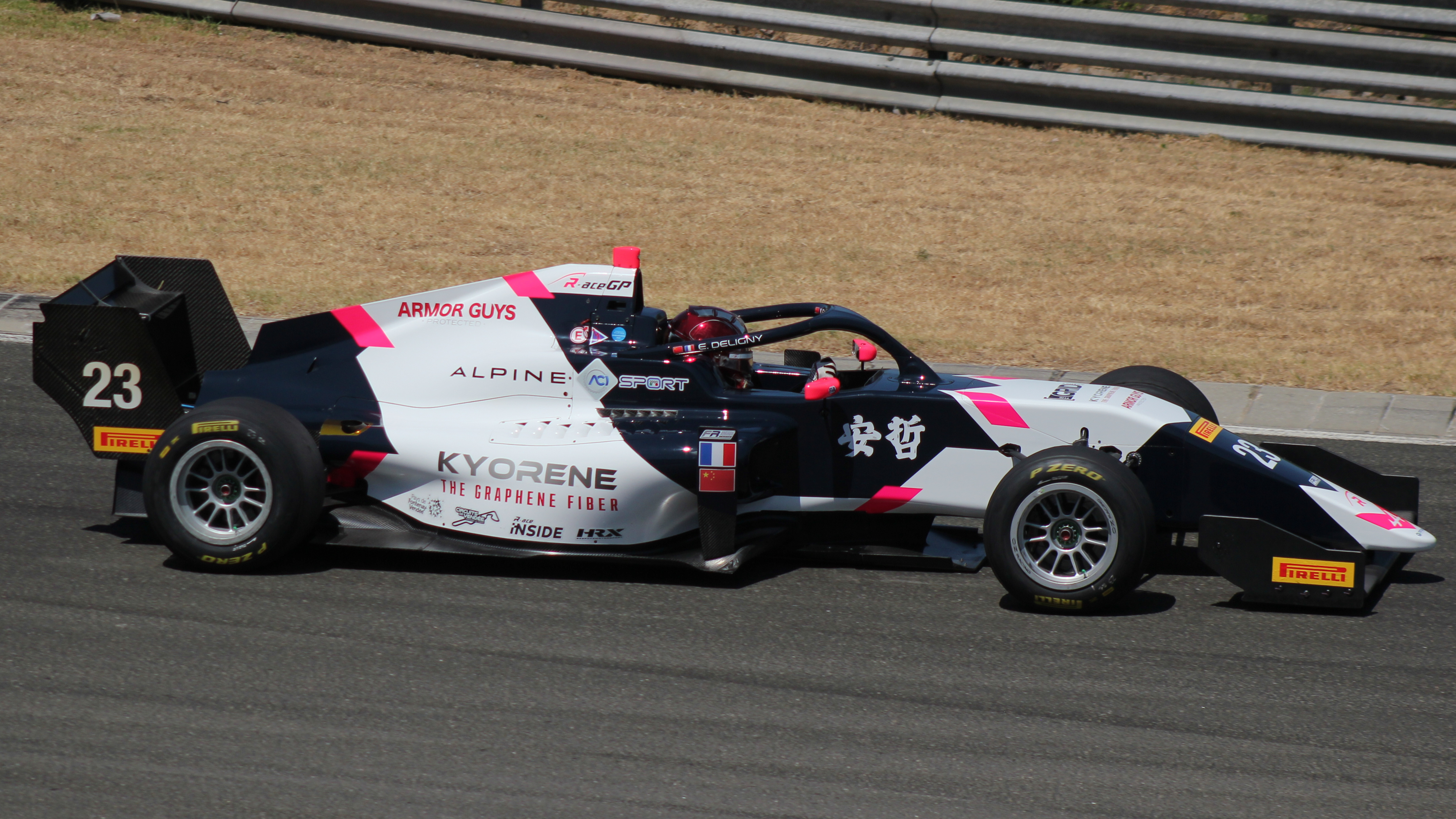
Deligny driving at the Hungaroring during the 2025 Formula Regional European Championship

During the 2025 off-season, Deligny raced in the Formula Regional Middle East Championship with R-ace GP and finished fifth of the championship with one race victory and two third places. He took two third places during the first two rounds of the season, before taking his only win of the campaign during the final Qatar finale, therefore elevating him to fifth in the standings.

For his main campaign, Deligny remained with R-ace GP for his sophomore FRECA season. After scoring points in Misano, he earned his first podium and win in Spa-Francorchamps. He took his first pole two rounds later in Budapest, but two slow moments costed him the win and dropped to third; he was later disqualified for dangerous driving. Deligny took another pole during the first Imola race, this time he led every lap for his second win of the year. This was followed by a run of three consecutive podiums that extended into Austria. His momentum continued into Barcelona and Hockenheim, earning a pole and win each in both rounds that left him an outside chance for the title. Despite only scoring two points in the season-ending Monza round, Deligny finished the year third in the overall standings with four wins, four poles, nine podiums and 235 points; a remarked improvement from the previous year.

==== 2026 ====
At the end of November, Deligny will compete in the Macau Grand Prix with Pinnacle Motorsport.

=== FIA Formula 3 ===
==== 2026 ====
In 2026, Deligny was signed to step up to race in Formula 3 with Prema Racing. On 6 February, Deligny was announced to leave Prema, instead switching to Van Amersfoort Racing.

==== 2027 ====
Deligny re-signed with Van Amersfoort Racing for a second Formula 3 season in 2027.

=== Formula One ===
In January 2023, Deligny was announced to be joining the Red Bull Junior Team. He departed after two seasons, leaving the team for 2025. Speaking about his departure, Deligny stated that he could "come back to Red Bull" if he "performs well" in the future.

== Karting record ==
=== Karting career summary ===
Season	Series	Team	Position
2016	Prokart Championship — Micro Swift		5th
2016	SKUSA SuperNationals — Micro Swift	2Wild Karting	30th
2017	Prokart Championship — Micro Swift		2nd
2017	SKUSA SuperNationals — Micro Swift	2Wild Karting	20th
2018	ROK the Rio — Mini ROK		7th
2018	SKUSA SuperNationals — Mini Swift	2Wild Karting	15th
2019	Florida Winter Tour — Mini ROK	Supertune USA	31st
2019	SKUSA SpringNationals — Mini Swift		1st
2019	Biloxi ROK Fest — Mini ROK		3rd
2019	Challenge of the Americas — Mini ROK		1st
2019	Rotax Stars and Stripes— Mini ROK		1st
2019	ROK the Rio — Mini ROK	Supertune	6th
2019	ROK Cup Superfinal — Mini ROK	Manetti Motorsport	NC
2019	SKUSA SuperNationals — Mini Swift		2nd
2020	Andrea Margutti Trophy — OKJ	Manetti Motorsport Asd	10th
2020	WSK Euro Series — OKJ	Leclerc by Lennox Racing	51st
2020	WSK Open Cup — OKJ	Leclerc by Lennox Racing	30th
2020	Challenge of the Americas — Junior ROK	Birel ART Racing Srl	1st
2020	ROK Cup International Final — Junior ROK	Birel ART Racing Srl	2nd
2021	WSK Champions Cup — OKJ	Parolin Motorsport	11th
2021	WSK Euro Series — OKJ	Parolin Motorsport	19th
2021	WSK Super Master Series — OKJ	Parolin Motorsport	10th
2021	WSK Open Cup — OKJ	Parolin Motorsport	5th
2021	CIK-FIA European Championship — OKJ	Parolin Motorsport	26th
2021	Champions of the Future — OKJ	Parolin Motorsport	7th
2022	WSK Super Master Series — OK	Parolin Motorsport	6th
2022	Champions of the Future — OK	Parolin Motorsport	13th
2022	CIK-FIA European Championship — OK	Parolin Motorsport	4th
2022	WSK Euro Series — OK	Parolin Motorsport	2nd
2022	CIK-FIA World Championship — OK	Parolin Motorsport	17th
2022	WSK Final Cup — OK	Parolin Motorsport	22nd

== Racing record ==
=== Racing career summary ===
Season	Series	Team	Races	Wins	Poles	F/Laps	Podiums	Points	Position
2023	F4 Spanish Championship	Campos Racing	21	2	0	2	10	240	4th
2023	Italian F4 Championship	AKM Motorsport	6	0	0	0	0	8	22nd
2023	Euro 4 Championship	AKM Motorsport	3	0	0	0	0	1	19th
2024	Formula 4 UAE Championship	R-ace GP	9	1	0	0	2	73	8th
2024	Formula Regional European Championship	R-ace GP	20	0	0	0	0	61	12th
2024	Macau Grand Prix	R-ace GP	1	0	0	0	0	—N/a	4th
2025	Formula Regional Middle East Championship	R-ace GP	15	1	0	2	3	147	5th
2025	Formula Regional European Championship	R-ace GP	20	4	4	2	9	235	**3rd**
2025	Macau Grand Prix	R-ace GP	1	0	0	0	0	—N/a	**3rd**
2026	FIA Formula 3 Championship	Van Amersfoort Racing	19	0	0	0	1	40	16th
2026	Macau Grand Prix	Pinnacle Motorsport						—N/a	
2027	FIA Formula 3 Championship	Van Amersfoort Racing	0	0	0	0	0	0	TBD

* Season still in progress.

=== Complete F4 Spanish Championship results ===
(key) (Races in bold indicate pole position) (Races in italics indicate fastest lap)

Year	Team	1	2	3	4	5	6	7	8	9	10	11	12	13	14	15	16	17	18	19	20	21	DC	Points
2023	Campos Racing	SPA; 1; 22	SPA; 2; 4	SPA; 3; 16	ARA; 1; 1	ARA; 2; 2	ARA; 3; 2	NAV; 1 Ret	NAV; 2; 2	NAV; 3 Ret	JER; 1; 3	JER; 2; 2	JER; 3; 6	EST; 1; 2	EST; 2; 2	EST; 3; 1	CRT; 1; 5	CRT; 2; 4	CRT; 3; 4	CAT; 1; 4	CAT; 2; 2	CAT; 3 DSQ	4th	240

=== Complete Italian F4 Championship results ===
(key) (Races in bold indicate pole position) (Races in italics indicate fastest lap)

Year	Team	1	2	3	4	5	6	7	8	9	10	11	12	13	14	15	16	17	18	19	20	21	22	DC	Points
2023	AKM Motorsport	IMO; 1; 10	IMO; 2	IMO; 3; 8	IMO; 4; 10	MIS; 1	MIS; 2	MIS; 3	SPA; 1	SPA; 2	SPA; 3	MNZ; 1	MNZ; 2	MNZ; 3	LEC; 1; 18	LEC; 2; 13	LEC; 3; 9	MUG; 1	MUG; 2	MUG; 3	VLL; 1	VLL; 2	VLL; 3	22nd	8

=== Complete Euro 4 Championship results ===
(key) (Races in bold indicate pole position; races in italics indicate fastest lap)

Year	Team	1	2	3	4	5	6	7	8	9	DC	Points
2023	AKM Motorsport	MUG; 1	MUG; 2	MUG; 3	MNZ; 1; 10	MNZ; 2 Ret	MNZ; 3; 24	CAT; 1	CAT; 2	CAT; 3	19th	1

=== Complete Formula 4 UAE Championship results ===
(key) (Races in bold indicate pole position) (Races in italics indicate fastest lap)

Year	Team	1	2	3	4	5	6	7	8	9	10	11	12	13	14	15	DC	Points
2024	R-ace GP	YMC1; 1	YMC1; 2	YMC1; 3	YMC2; 1	YMC2; 2	YMC2; 3	DUB1; 1; 11	DUB1; 2 Ret	DUB1; 3; 6	YMC3; 1; 4	YMC3; 2; 9	YMC3; 3; 2	DUB2; 1; 11	DUB2; 2; 1	DUB2; 3; 6	8th	73

=== Complete Formula Regional European Championship results ===
(key) (Races in bold indicate pole position) (Races in italics indicate fastest lap)

Year	Team	1	2	3	4	5	6	7	8	9	10	11	12	13	14	15	16	17	18	19	20	DC	Points
2024	R-ace GP	HOC; 1; 10	HOC; 2; 4	SPA; 1; 9	SPA; 2; 8	ZAN; 1; 6	ZAN; 2; 12	HUN; 1; 14	HUN; 2; 5	MUG; 1; 18	MUG; 2; 17	LEC; 1; 19	LEC; 2; 5	IMO; 1; 4	IMO; 2 Ret	RBR; 1; 16	RBR; 2 Ret	CAT; 1; 12	CAT; 2; 9	MNZ; 1; 15	MNZ; 2; 16	12th	61
2025	R-ace GP	MIS; 1; 10	MIS; 2; 4	SPA; 1; 3	SPA; 2; 1	ZAN; 1; 5	ZAN; 2; 4	HUN; 1; 3	**HUN**; **1** DSQ	LEC; 1; 7	LEC; 2; 10	**IMO**; **1**; 1	IMO; 2; 2	RBR; 1; 3	RBR; 2; 2	CAT; 1 Ret	**CAT**; **2**; 1	HOC; 1; 5	**HOC**; **2**; 1	MNZ; 1; 9	MNZ; 2; 21	3rd	235

=== Complete Macau Grand Prix results ===
Year	Team	Car	Qualifying	Quali Race	Main race
2024	(France) R-ace GP	Tatuus F3 T-318	4th	5th	4th
2025	(France) R-ace GP	Tatuus F3 T-318	5th	6th	**3rd**
2026	(Republic of Ireland) Pinnacle Motorsport	Tatuus T-326	TBD	TBD	TBD

=== Complete Formula Regional Middle East Championship results ===
(key) (Races in bold indicate pole position) (Races in italics indicate fastest lap)

Year	Entrant	1	2	3	4	5	6	7	8	9	10	11	12	13	14	15	DC	Points
2025	R-ace GP	YMC1; 1; 7	YMC1; 2; 3	YMC1; 3; 10	YMC2; 1; 12	YMC2; 2; 11	YMC2; 3; 3	DUB; 1; 8	DUB; 2; 8	DUB; 3; 4	YMC3; 1; 7	YMC3; 2; 11	YMC3; 3; 4	LUS; 1; 4	LUS; 2; 1	LUS; 3; 16	5th	147

=== Complete FIA Formula 3 Championship results ===
(key) (Races in bold indicate pole position) (Races in italics indicate fastest lap)

Year	Entrant	1	2	3	4	5	6	7	8	9	10	11	12	13	14	15	16	17	18	19	20	DC	Points
2026	Van Amersfoort Racing	MEL; SPR; 2	MEL; FEA; 6	MON; SPR; 23	MON; FEA; 14	CAT; SPR; 5	CAT; FEA; 5	RBR; SPR; 20	RBR; FEA; 12	SIL; SPR; 22	SIL; FEA; 16	SPA; SPR; 17	SPA; FEA; 25	HUN; SPR; 16	HUN; FEA; Ret	MNZ; SPR; 8	MNZ; FEA; 9	MAD; SPR; 15	MAD; FEA1; Ret	MAD; FEA2; 7		16th	40
2027	Van Amersfoort Racing	BHR; SPR	BHR; FEA	JED; SPR	JED; FEA	MEL; SPR	MEL; FEA	MTL; SPR	MTL; FEA	MON; SPR	MON; FEA	SIL; SPR	SIL; FEA	RBR; SPR	RBR; FEA	MNZ; SPR	MNZ; FEA	MAD; SPR	MAD; FEA	IST; SPR	IST; FEA	TBD	TBD
