= 2025 4 Hours of Abu Dhabi =

Endurance sportscar racing event

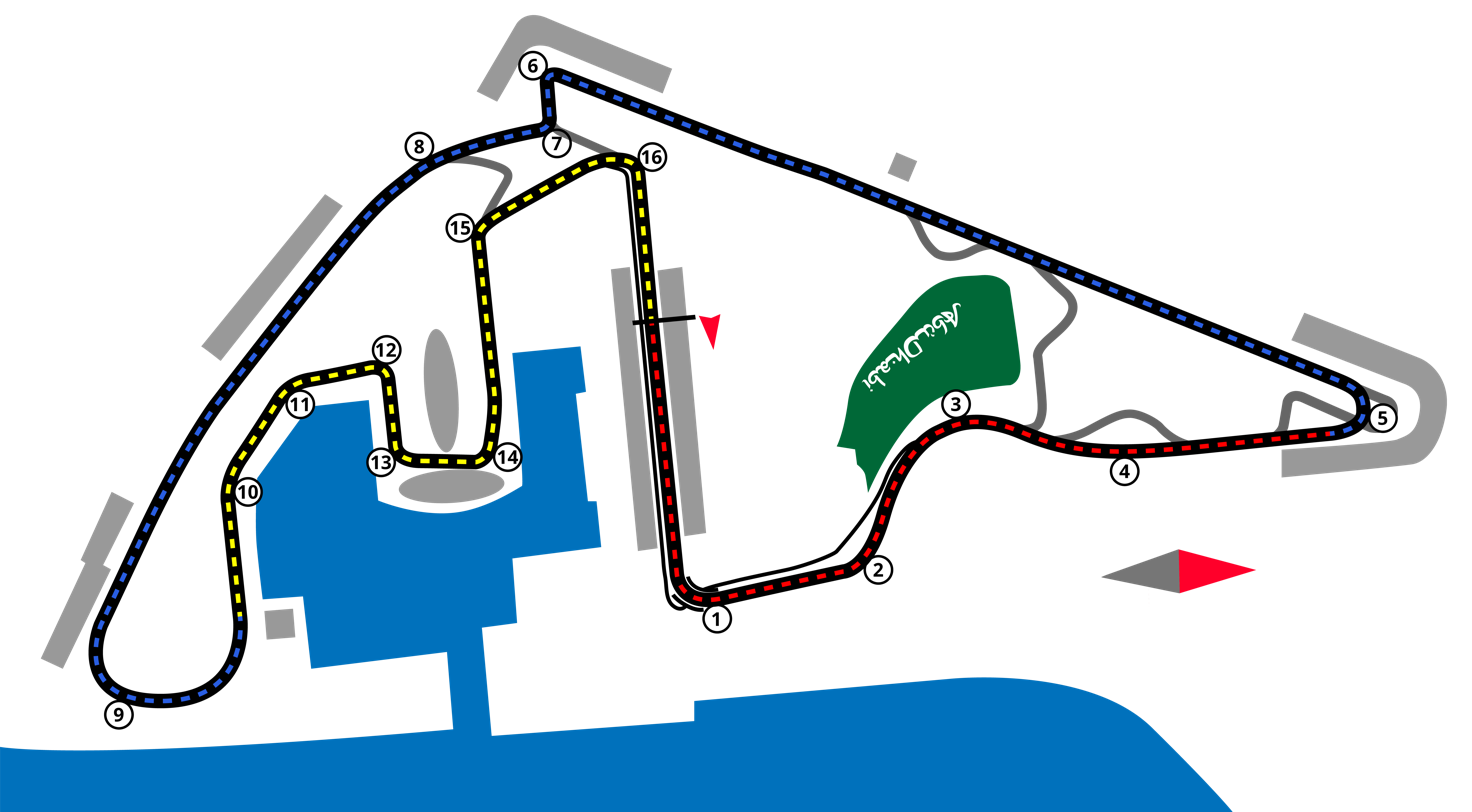
The layout of the Yas Marina Circuit

The 2025 4 Hours of Abu Dhabi was an endurance sportscar racing event, held between 14 and 16 February 2025 at Yas Marina Circuit in Abu Dhabi, United Arab Emirates. It was the penultimate and last of six rounds of the 2024–25 Asian Le Mans Series season.

== Entry list ==
The entry list was published on 11 February 2025 and consists of 47 entries across 3 categories – 10 in LMP2, 7 in LMP3, and 30 in GT.

The LMP2 category featured the same teams and drivers as in the previous round at Dubai. In LMP3, Dan Skočodople returned to the No. 26 Bretton Racing Ligier after missing the previous round. In the GT category, Giacomo Petrobelli replaced Reema Juffali in the No. 19 Blackthorn Aston Martin. Additionally, Earl Bamber Motorsport fielded a second Aston Martin, with the No. 98 driven by Brendon Leitch, Marco Sørensen, and Anderson Tanoto.

On 15 February, Lü Wei was struck with illness, which caused the No. 14 Climax Racing Mercedes-AMG to be withdrawn from the event. This reduced the final field to 29 entries in GT, and 46 entries overall.

== Schedule ==
Date	Time (local: GST)	Event
Friday, 14 February	16:30	Free Practice 1
Friday, 14 February	19:45	Free Practice 2
Saturday, 15 February	10:50	Qualifying – GT
Saturday, 15 February	11:15	Qualifying – LMP2 and LMP3
Saturday, 15 February	15:00	Race 1
Sunday, 16 February	11:30	Warm-up
Sunday, 16 February	16:30	Race 2

== Free practice ==
- Only the fastest car in each class is shown.

Free Practice 1	Class	No.	Entrant	Driver	Time
Free Practice 1	LMP2	30	(France) RD Limited	(Australia) James Allen	1:41.287
Free Practice 1	LMP3	49	(Denmark) High Class Racing	(Denmark) Anders Fjordbach	1:48.575
Free Practice 1	GT	21	(Germany) Car Collection Motorsport	(Switzerland) Alex Fontana	1:52.761
Free Practice 2	Class	No.	Entrant	Driver	Time
Free Practice 2	LMP2	30	(France) RD Limited	(France) Tristan Vautier	1:40.800
Free Practice 2	LMP3	26	(Czech Republic) Bretton Racing	(Australia) Griffin Peebles	1:48.446
Free Practice 2	GT	12	(Germany) Car Collection Motorsport	(Germany) Nico Menzel	1:53.318

== Race 1 ==
=== Qualifying results ===
Pole position winners in each class are marked in bold.

Pos	Class	No.	Team	Driver	Time	Gap	Grid
1	**LMP2**	**22**	**(Germany) Proton Competition**	**(Italy) Giorgio Roda**	**1:41.392**	—	1
2	LMP2	50	(Italy) AF Corse	(United States) Jeremy Clarke	1:42.263	+0.871	2
3	LMP2	11	(Germany) Proton Competition	(Germany) Alexander Mattschull	1:42.402	+1.010	3
4	LMP2	25	(Portugal) Algarve Pro Racing	(Denmark) Michael Jensen	1:43.157	+1.765	4
5	LMP2	24	(United Kingdom) Nielsen Racing	(United States) Naveen Rao	1:43.409	+2.017	5
6	LMP2	83	(Italy) AF Corse	(France) François Perrodo	1:43.657	+2.265	6
7	LMP2	3	(Luxembourg) DKR Engineering	(Greece) Georgios Kolovos	1:44.486	+3.094	7
8	LMP2	20	(Portugal) Algarve Pro Racing	(Greece) Kriton Lendoudis	1:44.830	+3.438	8
9	LMP2	30	(France) RD Limited	(United States) Fred Poordad	1:44.922	+3.530	9
10	**LMP3**	**49**	**(Denmark) High Class Racing**	**(Germany) Thomas Kiefer**	**1:49.315**	**+7.923**	10
11	LMP3	7	(Switzerland) Graff Racing	(Saint Kitts and Nevis) Alexander Bukhantsov	1:49.894	+8.502	11
12	LMP3	15	(United Kingdom) RLR MSport	(United Kingdom) Nick Adcock	1:51.282	+9.890	12
13	LMP3	26	(Czech Republic) Bretton Racing	(Denmark) Jens Reno Møller	1:51.389	+9.997	13
14	LMP3	35	(France) Ultimate	(France) Louis Stern	1:51.501	+10.109	14
15	LMP3	34	(Poland) Inter Europol Competition	(United Kingdom) Tim Creswick	1:52.348	+10.956	15
16	LMP3	43	(Poland) Inter Europol Competition	(New Zealand) Steve Brooks	1:53.504	+12.112	16
17	**GT**	**81**	**(United States) Winward Racing**	**Rinat Salikhov**	**1:54.668**	**+13.276**	17
18	GT	92	(Germany) Manthey EMA	(United States) Ryan Hardwick	1:54.749	+13.357	18
19	GT	89	(New Zealand) Earl Bamber Motorsport	(Luxembourg) Gabriel Rindone	1:54.797	+13.405	19
20	GT	2	(China) Climax Racing	(China) Zhou Bihuang	1:54.918	+13.526	20
21	GT	77	(United Kingdom) Optimum Motorsport	(United Kingdom) Morgan Tillbrook	1:54.936	+13.544	21
22	GT	16	(United States) Winward Racing	Sergey Stolyarov	1:54.951	+13.559	22
23	GT	28	(Italy) AF Corse	(Italy) Massimiliano Wiser	1:55.045	+13.653	23
24	GT	9	(Germany) GetSpeed Performance	(Luxembourg) Steve Jans	1:55.113	+13.721	24
25	GT	19	(United Kingdom) Blackthorn	(Italy) Giacomo Petrobelli	1:55.479	+14.087	25
26	GT	57	(Japan) Car Guy Racing	(Japan) Takeshi Kimura	1:55.525	+14.133	26
27	GT	88	(United Arab Emirates) Dragon Racing	(Italy) Marco Pulcini	1:55.540	+14.148	27
28	GT	51	(Italy) AF Corse	(Brazil) Custodio Toledo	1:55.559	+14.167	28
29	GT	46	(Qatar) QMMF by Herberth	(Qatar) Abdulla Ali Al-Khelaifi	1:55.710	+14.318	29
30	GT	79	(San Marino) Tsunami RT	(Italy) Johannes Zelger	1:56.416	+15.024	30
31	GT	82	(Italy) AF Corse	(France) Charles-Henri Samani	1:56.608	+15.216	31
32	GT	85	(Italy) Iron Dames	(France) Célia Martin	1:56.722	+15.330	32
33	GT	12	(Germany) Car Collection Motorsport	(Canada) Bashar Mardini	1:57.311	+15.919	33
34	GT	96	(Bahrain) 2 Seas Motorsport	(United States) Anthony McIntosh	1:58.052	+16.660	34
35	GT	98	(New Zealand) Earl Bamber Motorsport	(Indonesia) Anderson Tanoto	1:58.053	+16.661	35
36	GT	8	(United Arab Emirates) Dragon Racing	(United States) Todd Coleman	1:58.064	+16.672	36
37	GT	74	(Switzerland) Kessel Racing	(United States) Dustin Blattner	1:58.416	+17.024	37
38	GT	10	(Germany) Manthey Racing	(Hong Kong) Antares Au	1:58.814	+17.422	38
39	GT	23	(Hong Kong) Absolute Racing	(United States) Gregory Bennett	1:58.884	+17.492	39
40	GT	60	(Germany) Proton Competition	(Italy) Claudio Schiavoni	1:59.199	+17.807	40
41	GT	42	(New Zealand) Prime Speed Sport	(New Zealand) René Heremana Malmezac	2:02.938	+21.546	41
42	GT	99	(Germany) Herberth Motorsport	(Germany) Ralf Bohn	2:12.081	+30.689	42
43	GT	21	(Germany) Car Collection Motorsport	(United States) 'Hash'	No time set		43
44	GT	27	(United Kingdom) Optimum Motorsport	(United Kingdom) Andrew Gilbert	No time set		44
45	GT	87	(China) Origine Motorsport	(China) Yuan Bo	No time set		45
46	LMP2	91	(Lithuania) Pure Rxcing	No time set			46

=== Race results ===
The race length was increased by 30 minutes after an early red flag stoppage.

The minimum number of laps for classification (70% of overall winning car's distance) was 65 laps. Class winners are in bold and ‡.

Pos	Class	No	Team	Drivers	Chassis	Tyre	Laps	Time/Retired
Pos	Class	No	Team	Drivers	Engine	Tyre	Laps	Time/Retired
1	**LMP2**	**25**	**(Portugal) Algarve Pro Racing**	**(Denmark) Malthe Jakobsen (Denmark) Michael Jensen (Italy) Valerio Rinicella**	**Oreca 07**	MI	**94**	**4:31:21.115‡**
1	**LMP2**	**25**	**(Portugal) Algarve Pro Racing**	**(Denmark) Malthe Jakobsen (Denmark) Michael Jensen (Italy) Valerio Rinicella**	**Gibson GK428 4.2 L V8**	MI	**94**	**4:31:21.115‡**
2	LMP2	20	(Portugal) Algarve Pro Racing	(United Kingdom) Olli Caldwell (Greece) Kriton Lendoudis (United Kingdom) Alex Quinn	Oreca 07	MI	94	+5.410
2	LMP2	20	(Portugal) Algarve Pro Racing	(United Kingdom) Olli Caldwell (Greece) Kriton Lendoudis (United Kingdom) Alex Quinn	Gibson GK428 4.2 L V8	MI	94	+5.410
3	LMP2	22	(Germany) Proton Competition	(France) Tom Dillmann; Vladislav Lomko (Italy) Giorgio Roda	Oreca 07	MI	94	+9.259
3	LMP2	22	(Germany) Proton Competition	(France) Tom Dillmann; Vladislav Lomko (Italy) Giorgio Roda	Gibson GK428 4.2 L V8	MI	94	+9.259
4	LMP2	24	(United Kingdom) Nielsen Racing	(Netherlands) Nicky Catsburg (United Kingdom) Matt Bell (United States) Naveen Rao	Oreca 07	MI	94	+32.800
4	LMP2	24	(United Kingdom) Nielsen Racing	(Netherlands) Nicky Catsburg (United Kingdom) Matt Bell (United States) Naveen Rao	Gibson GK428 4.2 L V8	MI	94	+32.800
5	LMP2	11	(Germany) Proton Competition	(Switzerland) Mathias Beche (Germany) Jonas Ried (Germany) Alexander Mattschull	Oreca 07	MI	94	+58.035 (Note: The No. 11 Proton Competition entry received a 39-second time penalty after Mathias Beche failed to adhere to drive time regulations.)
5	LMP2	11	(Germany) Proton Competition	(Switzerland) Mathias Beche (Germany) Jonas Ried (Germany) Alexander Mattschull	Gibson GK428 4.2 L V8	MI	94	+58.035
6	LMP2	83	(Italy) AF Corse	(France) François Perrodo (Italy) Alessio Rovera (France) Matthieu Vaxivière	Oreca 07	MI	94	+1:06.590
6	LMP2	83	(Italy) AF Corse	(France) François Perrodo (Italy) Alessio Rovera (France) Matthieu Vaxivière	Gibson GK428 4.2 L V8	MI	94	+1:06.590
7	LMP2	91	(Lithuania) Pure Rxcing	(France) Julien Andlauer (United Kingdom) Harry King (Saint Kitts and Nevis) Alex Malykhin	Oreca 07	MI	94	+1:09.266
7	LMP2	91	(Lithuania) Pure Rxcing	(France) Julien Andlauer (United Kingdom) Harry King (Saint Kitts and Nevis) Alex Malykhin	Gibson GK428 4.2 L V8	MI	94	+1:09.266
8	LMP2	30	(France) RD Limited	(Australia) James Allen (United States) Fred Poordad (France) Tristan Vautier	Oreca 07	MI	93	+1 Lap
8	LMP2	30	(France) RD Limited	(Australia) James Allen (United States) Fred Poordad (France) Tristan Vautier	Gibson GK428 4.2 L V8	MI	93	+1 Lap
9	LMP2	50	(Italy) AF Corse	(United States) Patrick Byrne (United States) Jeremy Clarke (France) Olivier Pla	Oreca 07	MI	92	+2 Laps
9	LMP2	50	(Italy) AF Corse	(United States) Patrick Byrne (United States) Jeremy Clarke (France) Olivier Pla	Gibson GK428 4.2 L V8	MI	92	+2 Laps
10	**LMP3**	**15**	**(United Kingdom) RLR MSport**	**(United Kingdom) Nick Adcock (Mexico) Ian Aguilera (United Kingdom) Chris Short**	**Ligier JS P320**	MI	**89**	**+5 Laps‡**
10	**LMP3**	**15**	**(United Kingdom) RLR MSport**	**(United Kingdom) Nick Adcock (Mexico) Ian Aguilera (United Kingdom) Chris Short**	**Nissan VK56DE 5.6 L V8**	MI	**89**	**+5 Laps‡**
11	LMP3	26	(Czech Republic) Bretton Racing	(Denmark) Theodor Jensen (Denmark) Jens Reno Møller (Australia) Griffin Peebles	Ligier JS P320	MI	89	+5 Laps
11	LMP3	26	(Czech Republic) Bretton Racing	(Denmark) Theodor Jensen (Denmark) Jens Reno Møller (Australia) Griffin Peebles	Nissan VK56DE 5.6 L V8	MI	89	+5 Laps
12	LMP3	7	(Switzerland) Graff Racing	(Saint Kitts and Nevis) Alexander Bukhantsov (Singapore) Danial Frost (United Kingdom) James Winslow	Ligier JS P320	MI	89	+5 Laps
12	LMP3	7	(Switzerland) Graff Racing	(Saint Kitts and Nevis) Alexander Bukhantsov (Singapore) Danial Frost (United Kingdom) James Winslow	Nissan VK56DE 5.6 L V8	MI	89	+5 Laps
13	LMP3	34	(Poland) Inter Europol Competition	(Canada) Daniel Ali (United Kingdom) Tim Creswick (Belgium) Douwe Dedecker	Ligier JS P320	MI	88	+6 Laps
13	LMP3	34	(Poland) Inter Europol Competition	(Canada) Daniel Ali (United Kingdom) Tim Creswick (Belgium) Douwe Dedecker	Nissan VK56DE 5.6 L V8	MI	88	+6 Laps
14	**GT**	**92**	**(Germany) Manthey EMA**	**(United States) Ryan Hardwick (Austria) Richard Lietz (Italy) Riccardo Pera**	**Porsche 911 GT3 R (992)**	MI	**88**	**+6 Laps‡**
14	**GT**	**92**	**(Germany) Manthey EMA**	**(United States) Ryan Hardwick (Austria) Richard Lietz (Italy) Riccardo Pera**	**Porsche M97/80 4.2 L Flat-6**	MI	**88**	**+6 Laps‡**
15	GT	10	(Germany) Manthey Racing	(Hong Kong) Antares Au (Austria) Klaus Bachler (Germany) Joel Sturm	Porsche 911 GT3 R (992)	MI	88	+6 Laps
15	GT	10	(Germany) Manthey Racing	(Hong Kong) Antares Au (Austria) Klaus Bachler (Germany) Joel Sturm	Porsche M97/80 4.2 L Flat-6	MI	88	+6 Laps
16	GT	16	(United States) Winward Racing	(Germany) Maro Engel; Viktor Shaytar; Sergey Stolyarov	Mercedes-AMG GT3 Evo	MI	88	+6 Laps
16	GT	16	(United States) Winward Racing	(Germany) Maro Engel; Viktor Shaytar; Sergey Stolyarov	Mercedes-AMG M159 6.2 L V8	MI	88	+6 Laps
17	GT	74	(Switzerland) Kessel Racing	(United States) Dustin Blattner (Germany) Dennis Marschall (United Kingdom) Ben Tuck	Ferrari 296 GT3	MI	88	+6 Laps
17	GT	74	(Switzerland) Kessel Racing	(United States) Dustin Blattner (Germany) Dennis Marschall (United Kingdom) Ben Tuck	Ferrari F163CE 3.0 L Turbo V6	MI	88	+6 Laps
18	GT	89	(New Zealand) Earl Bamber Motorsport	(United Kingdom) Jamie Day (Italy) Mattia Drudi (Luxembourg) Gabriel Rindone	Aston Martin Vantage AMR GT3 Evo	MI	88	+6 Laps
18	GT	89	(New Zealand) Earl Bamber Motorsport	(United Kingdom) Jamie Day (Italy) Mattia Drudi (Luxembourg) Gabriel Rindone	Aston Martin M177 4.0 L Turbo V8	MI	88	+6 Laps
19	GT	82	(Italy) AF Corse	(Denmark) Conrad Laursen (France) Charles-Henri Samani (Argentina) Nicolás Varrone	Ferrari 296 GT3	MI	87	+7 Laps
19	GT	82	(Italy) AF Corse	(Denmark) Conrad Laursen (France) Charles-Henri Samani (Argentina) Nicolás Varrone	Ferrari F163CE 3.0 L Turbo V6	MI	87	+7 Laps
20	GT	85	(Italy) Iron Dames	(Belgium) Sarah Bovy (Denmark) Michelle Gatting (France) Célia Martin	Porsche 911 GT3 R (992)	MI	87	+7 Laps
20	GT	85	(Italy) Iron Dames	(Belgium) Sarah Bovy (Denmark) Michelle Gatting (France) Célia Martin	Porsche M97/80 4.2 L Flat-6	MI	87	+7 Laps
21	GT	99	(Germany) Herberth Motorsport	(Germany) Ralf Bohn (Germany) Alfred Renauer (Germany) Robert Renauer	Porsche 911 GT3 R (992)	MI	87	+7 Laps
21	GT	99	(Germany) Herberth Motorsport	(Germany) Ralf Bohn (Germany) Alfred Renauer (Germany) Robert Renauer	Porsche M97/80 4.2 L Flat-6	MI	87	+7 Laps
22	GT	28	(Italy) AF Corse	(United States) Manny Franco (Italy) Davide Rigon (Italy) Massimiliano Wiser	Ferrari 296 GT3	MI	87	+7 Laps
22	GT	28	(Italy) AF Corse	(United States) Manny Franco (Italy) Davide Rigon (Italy) Massimiliano Wiser	Ferrari F163CE 3.0 L Turbo V6	MI	87	+7 Laps
23	GT	88	(United Arab Emirates) Dragon Racing	(Italy) Giacomo Altoè (Italy) Nicola Marinangeli (Italy) Marco Pulcini	Ferrari 296 GT3	MI	87	+7 Laps
23	GT	88	(United Arab Emirates) Dragon Racing	(Italy) Giacomo Altoè (Italy) Nicola Marinangeli (Italy) Marco Pulcini	Ferrari F163CE 3.0 L Turbo V6	MI	87	+7 Laps
24	GT	42	(New Zealand) Prime Speed Sport	(Australia) Nick Foster (New Zealand) Jono Lester (New Zealand) René Heremana Malmezac	Lamborghini Huracán GT3 Evo 2	MI	87	+7 Laps
24	GT	42	(New Zealand) Prime Speed Sport	(Australia) Nick Foster (New Zealand) Jono Lester (New Zealand) René Heremana Malmezac	Lamborghini DGF 5.2 L V10	MI	87	+7 Laps
25	GT	87	(China) Origine Motorsport	(China) Yuan Bo (Germany) Laurin Heinrich (China) Leo Ye Hongli	Porsche 911 GT3 R (992)	MI	87	+7 Laps
25	GT	87	(China) Origine Motorsport	(China) Yuan Bo (Germany) Laurin Heinrich (China) Leo Ye Hongli	Porsche M97/80 4.2 L Flat-6	MI	87	+7 Laps
26	GT	98	(New Zealand) Earl Bamber Motorsport	(New Zealand) Brendon Leitch (Denmark) Marco Sørensen (Indonesia) Anderson Tanoto	Aston Martin Vantage AMR GT3 Evo	MI	87	+7 Laps
26	GT	98	(New Zealand) Earl Bamber Motorsport	(New Zealand) Brendon Leitch (Denmark) Marco Sørensen (Indonesia) Anderson Tanoto	Aston Martin M177 4.0 L Turbo V8	MI	87	+7 Laps
27	GT	2	(China) Climax Racing	(Estonia) Ralf Aron (Finland) Elias Seppänen (China) Zhou Bihuang	Mercedes-AMG GT3 Evo	MI	87	+7 Laps
27	GT	2	(China) Climax Racing	(Estonia) Ralf Aron (Finland) Elias Seppänen (China) Zhou Bihuang	Mercedes-AMG M159 6.2 L V8	MI	87	+7 Laps
28	GT	12	(Germany) Car Collection Motorsport	(United Kingdom) James Kell (Canada) Bashar Mardini (Germany) Nico Menzel	Porsche 911 GT3 R (992)	MI	87	+7 Laps
28	GT	12	(Germany) Car Collection Motorsport	(United Kingdom) James Kell (Canada) Bashar Mardini (Germany) Nico Menzel	Porsche M97/80 4.2 L Flat-6	MI	87	+7 Laps
29	GT	21	(Germany) Car Collection Motorsport	(Switzerland) Alex Fontana (United States) 'Hash' (Switzerland) Yannick Mettler	Porsche 911 GT3 R (992)	MI	87	+7 Laps
29	GT	21	(Germany) Car Collection Motorsport	(Switzerland) Alex Fontana (United States) 'Hash' (Switzerland) Yannick Mettler	Porsche M97/80 4.2 L Flat-6	MI	87	+7 Laps
30	GT	8	(United Arab Emirates) Dragon Racing	(United States) Todd Coleman (United Kingdom) Lorcan Hanafin (United States) Aaron Telitz	Ferrari 296 GT3	MI	87	+7 Laps
30	GT	8	(United Arab Emirates) Dragon Racing	(United States) Todd Coleman (United Kingdom) Lorcan Hanafin (United States) Aaron Telitz	Ferrari F163CE 3.0 L Turbo V6	MI	87	+7 Laps
31	GT	23	(Hong Kong) Absolute Racing	(Thailand) Carl Bennett (United States) Gregory Bennett (New Zealand) Chris van der Drift	Ferrari 296 GT3	MI	87	+7 Laps
31	GT	23	(Hong Kong) Absolute Racing	(Thailand) Carl Bennett (United States) Gregory Bennett (New Zealand) Chris van der Drift	Ferrari F163CE 3.0 L Turbo V6	MI	87	+7 Laps
32	GT	51	(Italy) AF Corse	(Italy) Riccardo Agostini (Monaco) Cédric Sbirrazzuoli (Brazil) Custodio Toledo	Ferrari 296 GT3	MI	87	+7 Laps
32	GT	51	(Italy) AF Corse	(Italy) Riccardo Agostini (Monaco) Cédric Sbirrazzuoli (Brazil) Custodio Toledo	Ferrari F163CE 3.0 L Turbo V6	MI	87	+7 Laps
33	GT	60	(Germany) Proton Competition	(Italy) Matteo Cressoni (Belgium) Alessio Picariello (Italy) Claudio Schiavoni	Porsche 911 GT3 R (992)	MI	87	+7 Laps
33	GT	60	(Germany) Proton Competition	(Italy) Matteo Cressoni (Belgium) Alessio Picariello (Italy) Claudio Schiavoni	Porsche M97/80 4.2 L Flat-6	MI	87	+7 Laps
34	GT	19	(United Kingdom) Blackthorn	(United Kingdom) Jonathan Adam (United Kingdom) Charles Bateman (Italy) Giacomo Petrobelli	Aston Martin Vantage AMR GT3 Evo	MI	85	+9 Laps
34	GT	19	(United Kingdom) Blackthorn	(United Kingdom) Jonathan Adam (United Kingdom) Charles Bateman (Italy) Giacomo Petrobelli	Aston Martin M177 4.0 L Turbo V8	MI	85	+9 Laps
35	LMP3	35	(France) Ultimate	(Italy) Leonardo Colavita (France) Louis Stern (United Arab Emirates) Matteo Quintarelli	Ligier JS P320	MI	78	+16 Laps
35	LMP3	35	(France) Ultimate	(Italy) Leonardo Colavita (France) Louis Stern (United Arab Emirates) Matteo Quintarelli	Nissan VK56DE 5.6 L V8	MI	78	+16 Laps
Not classified
	LMP3	43	(Poland) Inter Europol Competition	(New Zealand) Steve Brooks (Denmark) Mikkel Kristensen (Switzerland) Kévin Rabin	Ligier JS P320	MI	86	Did not finish
	LMP3	43	(Poland) Inter Europol Competition	(New Zealand) Steve Brooks (Denmark) Mikkel Kristensen (Switzerland) Kévin Rabin	Nissan VK56DE 5.6 L V8	MI	86	Did not finish
	GT	9	(Germany) GetSpeed Performance	(United States) Anthony Bartone (Luxembourg) Steve Jans (Germany) Fabian Schiller	Mercedes-AMG GT3 Evo	MI	59	Accident damage
	GT	9	(Germany) GetSpeed Performance	(United States) Anthony Bartone (Luxembourg) Steve Jans (Germany) Fabian Schiller	Mercedes-AMG M159 6.2 L V8	MI	59	Accident damage
	LMP3	49	(Denmark) High Class Racing	(Denmark) Anders Fjordbach (Germany) Thomas Kiefer (United States) Mark Patterson	Ligier JS P320	MI	55	Fire
	LMP3	49	(Denmark) High Class Racing	(Denmark) Anders Fjordbach (Germany) Thomas Kiefer (United States) Mark Patterson	Nissan VK56DE 5.6 L V8	MI	55	Fire
	LMP2	3	(Luxembourg) DKR Engineering	(Germany) Laurents Hörr (Greece) Georgios Kolovos (Netherlands) Job van Uitert	Oreca 07	MI	55	Did not finish
	LMP2	3	(Luxembourg) DKR Engineering	(Germany) Laurents Hörr (Greece) Georgios Kolovos (Netherlands) Job van Uitert	Gibson GK428 4.2 L V8	MI	55	Did not finish
	GT	96	(Bahrain) 2 Seas Motorsport	(United Kingdom) Ben Barnicoat (United States) Anthony McIntosh (Canada) Parker Thompson	Mercedes-AMG GT3 Evo	MI	49	Did not finish
	GT	96	(Bahrain) 2 Seas Motorsport	(United Kingdom) Ben Barnicoat (United States) Anthony McIntosh (Canada) Parker Thompson	Mercedes-AMG M159 6.2 L V8	MI	49	Did not finish
	GT	77	(United Kingdom) Optimum Motorsport	(United Kingdom) Tom Ikin (Germany) Marvin Kirchhöfer (United Kingdom) Morgan Tillbrook	McLaren 720S GT3 Evo	MI	39	Alternator
	GT	77	(United Kingdom) Optimum Motorsport	(United Kingdom) Tom Ikin (Germany) Marvin Kirchhöfer (United Kingdom) Morgan Tillbrook	McLaren M840T 4.0 L Turbo V8	MI	39	Alternator
	GT	27	(United Kingdom) Optimum Motorsport	(United Kingdom) Andrew Gilbert (Germany) Benjamin Goethe (Spain) Fran Rueda	McLaren 720S GT3 Evo	MI	36	Coolant leak
	GT	27	(United Kingdom) Optimum Motorsport	(United Kingdom) Andrew Gilbert (Germany) Benjamin Goethe (Spain) Fran Rueda	McLaren M840T 4.0 L Turbo V8	MI	36	Coolant leak
	GT	57	(Japan) Car Guy Racing	(Japan) Takeshi Kimura (Brazil) Daniel Serra (United Kingdom) Casper Stevenson	Ferrari 296 GT3	MI	14	Fire
	GT	57	(Japan) Car Guy Racing	(Japan) Takeshi Kimura (Brazil) Daniel Serra (United Kingdom) Casper Stevenson	Ferrari F163CE 3.0 L Turbo V6	MI	14	Fire
	GT	81	(United States) Winward Racing	(Italy) Gabriele Piana; Rinat Salikhov (Germany) Luca Stolz	Mercedes-AMG GT3 Evo	MI	5	Accident
	GT	81	(United States) Winward Racing	(Italy) Gabriele Piana; Rinat Salikhov (Germany) Luca Stolz	Mercedes-AMG M159 6.2 L V8	MI	5	Accident
	GT	79	(San Marino) Tsunami RT	(Italy) Fabio Babini (New Zealand) Daniel Gaunt (Italy) Johannes Zelger	Porsche 911 GT3 R (992)	MI	1	Accident
	GT	79	(San Marino) Tsunami RT	(Italy) Fabio Babini (New Zealand) Daniel Gaunt (Italy) Johannes Zelger	Porsche M97/80 4.2 L Flat-6	MI	1	Accident
	GT	46	(Qatar) QMMF by Herberth	(Qatar) Ibrahim Al-Abdulghani (Qatar) Abdulla Ali Al-Khelaifi (Qatar) Ghanim Ali Al Maadheed	Porsche 911 GT3 R (992)	MI	0	Accident
	GT	46	(Qatar) QMMF by Herberth	(Qatar) Ibrahim Al-Abdulghani (Qatar) Abdulla Ali Al-Khelaifi (Qatar) Ghanim Ali Al Maadheed	Porsche M97/80 4.2 L Flat-6	MI	0	Accident

=== Statistics ===
==== Fastest lap ====
Class	No.	Entrant	Driver	Time	Lap
LMP2	91	(Lithuania) Pure Rxcing	(France) Julien Andlauer	1:40.961	16
LMP3	26	(Czech Republic) Bretton Racing	(Australia) Griffin Peebles	1:50.444	42
GT	89	(New Zealand) Earl Bamber Motorsport	(Italy) Mattia Drudi	1:53.716	72

== Race 2 ==
=== Qualifying results ===
Pole position winners in each class are marked in bold.

Pos	Class	No.	Team	Driver	Time	Gap	Grid
1	**LMP2**	**22**	**(Germany) Proton Competition**	**(Italy) Giorgio Roda**	**1:41.534**	—	1
2	LMP2	50	(Italy) AF Corse	(United States) Jeremy Clarke	1:42.659	+1.125	2
3	LMP2	11	(Germany) Proton Competition	(Germany) Alexander Mattschull	1:42.781	+1.247	3
4	LMP2	25	(Portugal) Algarve Pro Racing	(Denmark) Michael Jensen	1:43.321	+1.787	4
5	LMP2	83	(Italy) AF Corse	(France) François Perrodo	1:43.662	+2.128	5
6	LMP2	24	(United Kingdom) Nielsen Racing	(United States) Naveen Rao	1:43.728	+2.194	6
7	LMP2	3	(Luxembourg) DKR Engineering	(Greece) Georgios Kolovos	1:44.845	+3.311	7
8	LMP2	20	(Portugal) Algarve Pro Racing	(Greece) Kriton Lendoudis	1:45.479	+3.945	8
9	LMP2	30	(France) RD Limited	(United States) Fred Poordad	1:45.744	+4.210	9
10	**LMP3**	**49**	**(Denmark) High Class Racing**	**(Germany) Thomas Kiefer**	**1:49.635**	**+8.101**	10
11	LMP3	7	(Switzerland) Graff Racing	(Saint Kitts and Nevis) Alexander Bukhantsov	1:49.933	+8.399	11
12	LMP3	15	(United Kingdom) RLR MSport	(United Kingdom) Nick Adcock	1:51.486	+9.952	12
13	LMP3	26	(Czech Republic) Bretton Racing	(Denmark) Jens Reno Møller	1:51.700	+10.166	13
14	LMP3	35	(France) Ultimate	(France) Louis Stern	1:52.040	+10.506	14
15	LMP3	34	(Poland) Inter Europol Competition	(United Kingdom) Tim Creswick	1:52.388	+10.854	15
16	LMP3	43	(Poland) Inter Europol Competition	(New Zealand) Steve Brooks	1:53.662	+12.128	16
17	**GT**	**2**	**(China) Climax Racing**	**(China) Zhou Bihuang**	**1:55.794**	**+14.260**	17
18	GT	77	(United Kingdom) Optimum Motorsport	(United Kingdom) Morgan Tillbrook	1:56.104	+14.570	18
19	GT	89	(New Zealand) Earl Bamber Motorsport	(Luxembourg) Gabriel Rindone	1:56.220	+14.686	19
20	GT	57	(Japan) Car Guy Racing	(Japan) Takeshi Kimura	1:56.288	+14.754	20
21	GT	79	(San Marino) Tsunami RT	(Italy) Johannes Zelger	1:58.227	+16.693	21
22	GT	92	(Germany) Manthey EMA	(United States) Ryan Hardwick	1:59.109	+17.575	22
23	GT	10	(Germany) Manthey Racing	(Hong Kong) Antares Au	1:59.560	+18.026	23
24	GT	46	(Qatar) QMMF by Herberth	(Qatar) Abdulla Ali Al-Khelaifi	1:59.702	+18.168	WD (Note: The No. 46 QMMF by Herberth entry withdrew from race 2 after a heavy crash during the first race.)
25	GT	9	(Germany) GetSpeed Performance	(Luxembourg) Steve Jans	2:00.902	+19.368	24
26	GT	88	(United Arab Emirates) Dragon Racing	(Italy) Marco Pulcini	2:02.258	+20.724	25
27	GT	19	(United Kingdom) Blackthorn	(Italy) Giacomo Petrobelli	2:03.608	+22.074	26
28	GT	51	(Italy) AF Corse	(Brazil) Custodio Toledo	2:03.977	+22.443	27
29	GT	28	(Italy) AF Corse	(Italy) Massimiliano Wiser	2:04.375	+22.841	28
30	GT	96	(Bahrain) 2 Seas Motorsport	(United States) Anthony McIntosh	2:04.934	+23.400	29
31	GT	82	(Italy) AF Corse	(France) Charles-Henri Samani	2:05.880	+24.346	30
32	GT	8	(United Arab Emirates) Dragon Racing	(United States) Todd Coleman	2:06.984	+25.450	31
33	GT	98	(New Zealand) Earl Bamber Motorsport	(Indonesia) Anderson Tanoto	2:07.232	+25.698	32
34	GT	16	(United States) Winward Racing	Sergey Stolyarov	2:07.703	+26.169	33
35	GT	12	(Germany) Car Collection Motorsport	(Canada) Bashar Mardini	2:08.589	+27.055	34
36	GT	74	(Switzerland) Kessel Racing	(United States) Dustin Blattner	2:09.538	+28.004	35
37	GT	81	(United States) Winward Racing	Rinat Salikhov	2:11.458	+29.924	36
38	GT	60	(Germany) Proton Competition	(Italy) Claudio Schiavoni	2:11.557	+30.023	37
39	GT	85	(Italy) Iron Dames	(France) Célia Martin	2:11.672	+30.138	38
40	GT	23	(Hong Kong) Absolute Racing	(United States) Gregory Bennett	2:21.853	+40.319	39
41	GT	21	(Germany) Car Collection Motorsport	(United States) 'Hash'	No time set		40
42	GT	27	(United Kingdom) Optimum Motorsport	(United Kingdom) Andrew Gilbert	No time set		41
43	GT	42	(New Zealand) Prime Speed Sport	(New Zealand) René Heremana Malmezac	No time set		42
44	GT	87	(China) Origine Motorsport	(China) Yuan Bo	No time set		43
45	GT	99	(Germany) Herberth Motorsport	(Germany) Ralf Bohn	No time set		44
46	LMP2	91	(Lithuania) Pure Rxcing	No time set			45

=== Race results ===
The race length was extended by 36 minutes and 34 seconds after an early red flag stoppage.

The minimum number of laps for classification (70% of overall winning car's distance) was 84 laps. Class winners are in bold and ‡.

Pos	Class	No	Team	Drivers	Chassis	Tyre	Laps	Time/Retired
Pos	Class	No	Team	Drivers	Engine	Tyre	Laps	Time/Retired
1	**LMP2**	**83**	**(Italy) AF Corse**	**(France) François Perrodo (Italy) Alessio Rovera (France) Matthieu Vaxivière**	**Oreca 07**	MI	**120**	**4:37:55.103‡**
1	**LMP2**	**83**	**(Italy) AF Corse**	**(France) François Perrodo (Italy) Alessio Rovera (France) Matthieu Vaxivière**	**Gibson GK428 4.2 L V8**	MI	**120**	**4:37:55.103‡**
2	LMP2	24	(United Kingdom) Nielsen Racing	(Netherlands) Nicky Catsburg (United Kingdom) Matt Bell (United States) Naveen Rao	Oreca 07	MI	120	+14.143
2	LMP2	24	(United Kingdom) Nielsen Racing	(Netherlands) Nicky Catsburg (United Kingdom) Matt Bell (United States) Naveen Rao	Gibson GK428 4.2 L V8	MI	120	+14.143
3	LMP2	30	(France) RD Limited	(Australia) James Allen (United States) Fred Poordad (France) Tristan Vautier	Oreca 07	MI	120	+18.267
3	LMP2	30	(France) RD Limited	(Australia) James Allen (United States) Fred Poordad (France) Tristan Vautier	Gibson GK428 4.2 L V8	MI	120	+18.267
4	LMP2	25	(Portugal) Algarve Pro Racing	(Denmark) Malthe Jakobsen (Denmark) Michael Jensen (Italy) Valerio Rinicella	Oreca 07	MI	120	+32.636
4	LMP2	25	(Portugal) Algarve Pro Racing	(Denmark) Malthe Jakobsen (Denmark) Michael Jensen (Italy) Valerio Rinicella	Gibson GK428 4.2 L V8	MI	120	+32.636
5	LMP2	11	(Germany) Proton Competition	(Switzerland) Mathias Beche (Germany) Jonas Ried (Germany) Alexander Mattschull	Oreca 07	MI	120	+40.405
5	LMP2	11	(Germany) Proton Competition	(Switzerland) Mathias Beche (Germany) Jonas Ried (Germany) Alexander Mattschull	Gibson GK428 4.2 L V8	MI	120	+40.405
6	LMP2	22	(Germany) Proton Competition	(France) Tom Dillmann; Vladislav Lomko (Italy) Giorgio Roda	Oreca 07	MI	120	+43.923
6	LMP2	22	(Germany) Proton Competition	(France) Tom Dillmann; Vladislav Lomko (Italy) Giorgio Roda	Gibson GK428 4.2 L V8	MI	120	+43.923
7	LMP2	50	(Italy) AF Corse	(United States) Patrick Byrne (United States) Jeremy Clarke (France) Olivier Pla	Oreca 07	MI	119	+1 Lap
7	LMP2	50	(Italy) AF Corse	(United States) Patrick Byrne (United States) Jeremy Clarke (France) Olivier Pla	Gibson GK428 4.2 L V8	MI	119	+1 Lap
8	LMP2	91	(Lithuania) Pure Rxcing	(France) Julien Andlauer (United Kingdom) Harry King (Saint Kitts and Nevis) Alex Malykhin	Oreca 07	MI	119	+1 Lap
8	LMP2	91	(Lithuania) Pure Rxcing	(France) Julien Andlauer (United Kingdom) Harry King (Saint Kitts and Nevis) Alex Malykhin	Gibson GK428 4.2 L V8	MI	119	+1 Lap
9	**LMP3**	**49**	**(Denmark) High Class Racing**	**(Denmark) Anders Fjordbach (Germany) Thomas Kiefer (United States) Mark Patterson**	**Ligier JS P320**	MI	**114**	**+6 Laps‡**
9	**LMP3**	**49**	**(Denmark) High Class Racing**	**(Denmark) Anders Fjordbach (Germany) Thomas Kiefer (United States) Mark Patterson**	**Nissan VK56DE 5.6 L V8**	MI	**114**	**+6 Laps‡**
10	LMP3	15	(United Kingdom) RLR MSport	(United Kingdom) Nick Adcock (Mexico) Ian Aguilera (United Kingdom) Chris Short	Ligier JS P320	MI	114	+6 Laps
10	LMP3	15	(United Kingdom) RLR MSport	(United Kingdom) Nick Adcock (Mexico) Ian Aguilera (United Kingdom) Chris Short	Nissan VK56DE 5.6 L V8	MI	114	+6 Laps
11	LMP3	26	(Czech Republic) Bretton Racing	(Denmark) Theodor Jensen (Denmark) Jens Reno Møller (Australia) Griffin Peebles	Ligier JS P320	MI	113	+7 Laps (Note: The No. 26 Bretton Racing entry received a drive-through penalty converted to a 25-second time penalty after overtaking before the control line at the race start.)
11	LMP3	26	(Czech Republic) Bretton Racing	(Denmark) Theodor Jensen (Denmark) Jens Reno Møller (Australia) Griffin Peebles	Nissan VK56DE 5.6 L V8	MI	113	+7 Laps
12	LMP3	35	(France) Ultimate	(Italy) Leonardo Colavita (France) Louis Stern (United Arab Emirates) Matteo Quintarelli	Ligier JS P320	MI	113	+7 Laps
12	LMP3	35	(France) Ultimate	(Italy) Leonardo Colavita (France) Louis Stern (United Arab Emirates) Matteo Quintarelli	Nissan VK56DE 5.6 L V8	MI	113	+7 Laps
13	**GT**	**10**	**(Germany) Manthey Racing**	**(Hong Kong) Antares Au (Austria) Klaus Bachler (Germany) Joel Sturm**	**Porsche 911 GT3 R (992)**	MI	**113**	**+7 Laps‡**
13	**GT**	**10**	**(Germany) Manthey Racing**	**(Hong Kong) Antares Au (Austria) Klaus Bachler (Germany) Joel Sturm**	**Porsche M97/80 4.2 L Flat-6**	MI	**113**	**+7 Laps‡**
14	GT	89	(New Zealand) Earl Bamber Motorsport	(United Kingdom) Jamie Day (Italy) Mattia Drudi (Luxembourg) Gabriel Rindone	Aston Martin Vantage AMR GT3 Evo	MI	113	+7 Laps
14	GT	89	(New Zealand) Earl Bamber Motorsport	(United Kingdom) Jamie Day (Italy) Mattia Drudi (Luxembourg) Gabriel Rindone	Aston Martin M177 4.0 L Turbo V8	MI	113	+7 Laps
15	GT	74	(Switzerland) Kessel Racing	(United States) Dustin Blattner (Germany) Dennis Marschall (United Kingdom) Ben Tuck	Ferrari 296 GT3	MI	113	+7 Laps
15	GT	74	(Switzerland) Kessel Racing	(United States) Dustin Blattner (Germany) Dennis Marschall (United Kingdom) Ben Tuck	Ferrari F163CE 3.0 L Turbo V6	MI	113	+7 Laps
16	GT	27	(United Kingdom) Optimum Motorsport	(United Kingdom) Andrew Gilbert (Germany) Benjamin Goethe (Spain) Fran Rueda	McLaren 720S GT3 Evo	MI	112	+8 Laps
16	GT	27	(United Kingdom) Optimum Motorsport	(United Kingdom) Andrew Gilbert (Germany) Benjamin Goethe (Spain) Fran Rueda	McLaren M840T 4.0 L Turbo V8	MI	112	+8 Laps
17	GT	16	(United States) Winward Racing	(Germany) Maro Engel; Viktor Shaytar; Sergey Stolyarov	Mercedes-AMG GT3 Evo	MI	112	+8 Laps
17	GT	16	(United States) Winward Racing	(Germany) Maro Engel; Viktor Shaytar; Sergey Stolyarov	Mercedes-AMG M159 6.2 L V8	MI	112	+8 Laps
18	GT	57	(Japan) Car Guy Racing	(Japan) Takeshi Kimura (Brazil) Daniel Serra (United Kingdom) Casper Stevenson	Ferrari 296 GT3	MI	112	+8 Laps
18	GT	57	(Japan) Car Guy Racing	(Japan) Takeshi Kimura (Brazil) Daniel Serra (United Kingdom) Casper Stevenson	Ferrari F163CE 3.0 L Turbo V6	MI	112	+8 Laps
19	GT	92	(Germany) Manthey EMA	(United States) Ryan Hardwick (Austria) Richard Lietz (Italy) Riccardo Pera	Porsche 911 GT3 R (992)	MI	112	+8 Laps
19	GT	92	(Germany) Manthey EMA	(United States) Ryan Hardwick (Austria) Richard Lietz (Italy) Riccardo Pera	Porsche M97/80 4.2 L Flat-6	MI	112	+8 Laps
20	GT	98	(New Zealand) Earl Bamber Motorsport	(New Zealand) Brendon Leitch (Denmark) Marco Sørensen (Indonesia) Anderson Tanoto	Aston Martin Vantage AMR GT3 Evo	MI	112	+8 Laps
20	GT	98	(New Zealand) Earl Bamber Motorsport	(New Zealand) Brendon Leitch (Denmark) Marco Sørensen (Indonesia) Anderson Tanoto	Aston Martin M177 4.0 L Turbo V8	MI	112	+8 Laps
21	LMP3	43	(Poland) Inter Europol Competition	(New Zealand) Steve Brooks (Denmark) Mikkel Kristensen (Switzerland) Kévin Rabin	Ligier JS P320	MI	112	+8 Laps
21	LMP3	43	(Poland) Inter Europol Competition	(New Zealand) Steve Brooks (Denmark) Mikkel Kristensen (Switzerland) Kévin Rabin	Nissan VK56DE 5.6 L V8	MI	112	+8 Laps
22	GT	99	(Germany) Herberth Motorsport	(Germany) Ralf Bohn (Germany) Alfred Renauer (Germany) Robert Renauer	Porsche 911 GT3 R (992)	MI	112	+8 Laps
22	GT	99	(Germany) Herberth Motorsport	(Germany) Ralf Bohn (Germany) Alfred Renauer (Germany) Robert Renauer	Porsche M97/80 4.2 L Flat-6	MI	112	+8 Laps
23	GT	81	(United States) Winward Racing	(Italy) Gabriele Piana; Rinat Salikhov (Germany) Luca Stolz	Mercedes-AMG GT3 Evo	MI	112	+8 Laps
23	GT	81	(United States) Winward Racing	(Italy) Gabriele Piana; Rinat Salikhov (Germany) Luca Stolz	Mercedes-AMG M159 6.2 L V8	MI	112	+8 Laps
24	GT	88	(United Arab Emirates) Dragon Racing	(Italy) Giacomo Altoè (Italy) Nicola Marinangeli (Italy) Marco Pulcini	Ferrari 296 GT3	MI	112	+8 Laps
24	GT	88	(United Arab Emirates) Dragon Racing	(Italy) Giacomo Altoè (Italy) Nicola Marinangeli (Italy) Marco Pulcini	Ferrari F163CE 3.0 L Turbo V6	MI	112	+8 Laps
25	GT	2	(China) Climax Racing	(Estonia) Ralf Aron (Finland) Elias Seppänen (China) Zhou Bihuang	Mercedes-AMG GT3 Evo	MI	112	+8 Laps
25	GT	2	(China) Climax Racing	(Estonia) Ralf Aron (Finland) Elias Seppänen (China) Zhou Bihuang	Mercedes-AMG M159 6.2 L V8	MI	112	+8 Laps
26	GT	85	(Italy) Iron Dames	(Belgium) Sarah Bovy (Denmark) Michelle Gatting (France) Célia Martin	Porsche 911 GT3 R (992)	MI	112	+8 Laps
26	GT	85	(Italy) Iron Dames	(Belgium) Sarah Bovy (Denmark) Michelle Gatting (France) Célia Martin	Porsche M97/80 4.2 L Flat-6	MI	112	+8 Laps
27	GT	28	(Italy) AF Corse	(United States) Manny Franco (Italy) Davide Rigon (Italy) Massimiliano Wiser	Ferrari 296 GT3	MI	112	+8 Laps
27	GT	28	(Italy) AF Corse	(United States) Manny Franco (Italy) Davide Rigon (Italy) Massimiliano Wiser	Ferrari F163CE 3.0 L Turbo V6	MI	112	+8 Laps
28	GT	19	(United Kingdom) Blackthorn	(United Kingdom) Jonathan Adam (United Kingdom) Charles Bateman (Italy) Giacomo Petrobelli	Aston Martin Vantage AMR GT3 Evo	MI	112	+8 Laps (Note: The No. 19 Blackthorn entry received a 10-second time penalty for speeding during a full-course yellow procedure.)
28	GT	19	(United Kingdom) Blackthorn	(United Kingdom) Jonathan Adam (United Kingdom) Charles Bateman (Italy) Giacomo Petrobelli	Aston Martin M177 4.0 L Turbo V8	MI	112	+8 Laps
29	GT	12	(Germany) Car Collection Motorsport	(United Kingdom) James Kell (Canada) Bashar Mardini (Germany) Nico Menzel	Porsche 911 GT3 R (992)	MI	112	+8 Laps
29	GT	12	(Germany) Car Collection Motorsport	(United Kingdom) James Kell (Canada) Bashar Mardini (Germany) Nico Menzel	Porsche M97/80 4.2 L Flat-6	MI	112	+8 Laps
30	GT	9	(Germany) GetSpeed Performance	(United States) Anthony Bartone (Luxembourg) Steve Jans (Germany) Fabian Schiller	Mercedes-AMG GT3 Evo	MI	112	+8 Laps
30	GT	9	(Germany) GetSpeed Performance	(United States) Anthony Bartone (Luxembourg) Steve Jans (Germany) Fabian Schiller	Mercedes-AMG M159 6.2 L V8	MI	112	+8 Laps
31	GT	79	(San Marino) Tsunami RT	(Italy) Fabio Babini (New Zealand) Daniel Gaunt (Italy) Johannes Zelger	Porsche 911 GT3 R (992)	MI	111	+9 Laps
31	GT	79	(San Marino) Tsunami RT	(Italy) Fabio Babini (New Zealand) Daniel Gaunt (Italy) Johannes Zelger	Porsche M97/80 4.2 L Flat-6	MI	111	+9 Laps
32	GT	51	(Italy) AF Corse	(Italy) Riccardo Agostini (Monaco) Cédric Sbirrazzuoli (Brazil) Custodio Toledo	Ferrari 296 GT3	MI	0	+9 Laps
32	GT	51	(Italy) AF Corse	(Italy) Riccardo Agostini (Monaco) Cédric Sbirrazzuoli (Brazil) Custodio Toledo	Ferrari F163CE 3.0 L Turbo V6	MI	0	+9 Laps
33	GT	21	(Germany) Car Collection Motorsport	(Switzerland) Alex Fontana (United States) 'Hash' (Switzerland) Yannick Mettler	Porsche 911 GT3 R (992)	MI	111	+9 Laps
33	GT	21	(Germany) Car Collection Motorsport	(Switzerland) Alex Fontana (United States) 'Hash' (Switzerland) Yannick Mettler	Porsche M97/80 4.2 L Flat-6	MI	111	+9 Laps
34	GT	23	(Hong Kong) Absolute Racing	(Thailand) Carl Bennett (United States) Gregory Bennett (New Zealand) Chris van der Drift	Ferrari 296 GT3	MI	111	+9 Laps
34	GT	23	(Hong Kong) Absolute Racing	(Thailand) Carl Bennett (United States) Gregory Bennett (New Zealand) Chris van der Drift	Ferrari F163CE 3.0 L Turbo V6	MI	111	+9 Laps
35	GT	60	(Germany) Proton Competition	(Italy) Matteo Cressoni (Belgium) Alessio Picariello (Italy) Claudio Schiavoni	Porsche 911 GT3 R (992)	MI	111	+9 Laps (Note: The No. 60 Proton Competition entry received a 1-minute, 33.795-second time penalty after Claudio Schiavoni failed to adhere to drive time regulations.)
35	GT	60	(Germany) Proton Competition	(Italy) Matteo Cressoni (Belgium) Alessio Picariello (Italy) Claudio Schiavoni	Porsche M97/80 4.2 L Flat-6	MI	111	+9 Laps
36	GT	8	(United Arab Emirates) Dragon Racing	(United States) Todd Coleman (United Kingdom) Lorcan Hanafin (United States) Aaron Telitz	Ferrari 296 GT3	MI	110	+10 Laps
36	GT	8	(United Arab Emirates) Dragon Racing	(United States) Todd Coleman (United Kingdom) Lorcan Hanafin (United States) Aaron Telitz	Ferrari F163CE 3.0 L Turbo V6	MI	110	+10 Laps
37	GT	87	(China) Origine Motorsport	(China) Yuan Bo (Germany) Laurin Heinrich (China) Leo Ye Hongli	Porsche 911 GT3 R (992)	MI	109	+11 Laps
37	GT	87	(China) Origine Motorsport	(China) Yuan Bo (Germany) Laurin Heinrich (China) Leo Ye Hongli	Porsche M97/80 4.2 L Flat-6	MI	109	+11 Laps
38	LMP2	20	(Portugal) Algarve Pro Racing	(United Kingdom) Olli Caldwell (Greece) Kriton Lendoudis (United Kingdom) Alex Quinn	Oreca 07	MI	108	+12 Laps
38	LMP2	20	(Portugal) Algarve Pro Racing	(United Kingdom) Olli Caldwell (Greece) Kriton Lendoudis (United Kingdom) Alex Quinn	Gibson GK428 4.2 L V8	MI	108	+12 Laps
39	LMP3	34	(Poland) Inter Europol Competition	(Canada) Daniel Ali (United Kingdom) Tim Creswick (Belgium) Douwe Dedecker	Ligier JS P320	MI	102	+18 Laps
39	LMP3	34	(Poland) Inter Europol Competition	(Canada) Daniel Ali (United Kingdom) Tim Creswick (Belgium) Douwe Dedecker	Nissan VK56DE 5.6 L V8	MI	102	+18 Laps
Not classified
	LMP2	3	(Luxembourg) DKR Engineering	(Germany) Laurents Hörr (Greece) Georgios Kolovos (Netherlands) Job van Uitert	Oreca 07	MI	110	Did not finish
	LMP2	3	(Luxembourg) DKR Engineering	(Germany) Laurents Hörr (Greece) Georgios Kolovos (Netherlands) Job van Uitert	Gibson GK428 4.2 L V8	MI	110	Did not finish
	LMP3	7	(Switzerland) Graff Racing	(Saint Kitts and Nevis) Alexander Bukhantsov (Singapore) Danial Frost (United Kingdom) James Winslow	Ligier JS P320	MI	108	Did not finish
	LMP3	7	(Switzerland) Graff Racing	(Saint Kitts and Nevis) Alexander Bukhantsov (Singapore) Danial Frost (United Kingdom) James Winslow	Nissan VK56DE 5.6 L V8	MI	108	Did not finish
	GT	82	(Italy) AF Corse	(Denmark) Conrad Laursen (France) Charles-Henri Samani (Argentina) Nicolás Varrone	Ferrari 296 GT3	MI	87	Did not finish (Note: The No. 82 AF Corse entry received a received a drive-through penalty converted to a 25-second time penalty for speeding in the pit lane.)
	GT	82	(Italy) AF Corse	(Denmark) Conrad Laursen (France) Charles-Henri Samani (Argentina) Nicolás Varrone	Ferrari F163CE 3.0 L Turbo V6	MI	87	Did not finish
	GT	77	(United Kingdom) Optimum Motorsport	(United Kingdom) Tom Ikin (Germany) Marvin Kirchhöfer (United Kingdom) Morgan Tillbrook	McLaren 720S GT3 Evo	MI	61	Did not finish
	GT	77	(United Kingdom) Optimum Motorsport	(United Kingdom) Tom Ikin (Germany) Marvin Kirchhöfer (United Kingdom) Morgan Tillbrook	McLaren M840T 4.0 L Turbo V8	MI	61	Did not finish
	GT	96	(Bahrain) 2 Seas Motorsport	(United Kingdom) Ben Barnicoat (United States) Anthony McIntosh (Canada) Parker Thompson	Mercedes-AMG GT3 Evo	MI	6	Did not finish
	GT	96	(Bahrain) 2 Seas Motorsport	(United Kingdom) Ben Barnicoat (United States) Anthony McIntosh (Canada) Parker Thompson	Mercedes-AMG M159 6.2 L V8	MI	6	Did not finish
	GT	42	(New Zealand) Prime Speed Sport	(Australia) Nick Foster (New Zealand) Jono Lester (New Zealand) René Heremana Malmezac	Lamborghini Huracán GT3 Evo 2	MI	0	Did not finish
	GT	42	(New Zealand) Prime Speed Sport	(Australia) Nick Foster (New Zealand) Jono Lester (New Zealand) René Heremana Malmezac	Lamborghini DGF 5.2 L V10	MI	0	Did not finish

=== Statistics ===
==== Fastest lap ====
Class	No.	Entrant	Driver	Time	Lap
LMP2	91	(Lithuania) Pure Rxcing	(United Kingdom) Harry King	1:41.126	62
LMP3	26	(Czech Republic) Bretton Racing	(Australia) Griffin Peebles	1:50.208	58
GT	98	(New Zealand) Earl Bamber Motorsport	(Denmark) Marco Sørensen	1:53.262	108

== Notes ==
=== Race 2 ===
Asian Le Mans Series
Previous race: 4 Hours of Dubai	2024–25 season	Next race: None
