= 2024 FIA Motorsport Games Formula 4 Cup =

Motor racing competition

Race details
Date	23–27 October
Official name	FIA Motorsport Games Formula 4 Cup
Location	Circuit Ricardo Tormo, Spain
Course	Permanent circuit 4.005 km (2.489 mi)
Distance	Qualifying; 20 minutes Race 1; 20 minutes +1 lap Race 2; 30 minutes +1 lap
- Qualifying Race

Pole
Driver	(Sri Lanka) Yevan David	Team Sri Lanka
Time	1:45.660

Fastest lap
Driver	(Peru) Andrés Cárdenas	Team Peru
Time	1:35.064

Podium
First	(Spain) Juan Cota	
Second	(Peru) Andrés Cárdenas	
Third	(Sri Lanka) Yevan David	
- Main Race

Pole
Driver	(Spain) Juan Cota Alonso	Team Spain

Fastest lap
Driver	(Peru) Andrés Cárdenas	Team Peru
Time	1:35.200

Medalists
1st place, gold medalist(s)	(Spain) Juan Cota	
2nd place, silver medalist(s)	(Peru) Andrés Cárdenas	
3rd place, bronze medalist(s)	(United Kingdom) Reza Seewooruthun	

The 2024 FIA Motorsport Games Formula 4 Cup was the second FIA Motorsport Games Formula 4 Cup, to be held at Circuit Paul Ricard, France on 23 to 27 October 2024. The race was contested with identical Formula 4 cars. The event was the part of the 2024 FIA Motorsport Games.

The event featured two 45-minute practice sessions on 25 October, with 20-minute Qualifying session on 26 October for the Qualifying race, while the Main race was held on 27 October.

== Entry list ==
All drivers utilized Tatuus F4-T421 cars, which were operated by F4 Spanish Championship teams.

Team	Federation	Entrant	No.	Drivers
Team Argentina	ACA	(Spain) Campos Racing	1	Gino Trappa
Team Luxembourg	ACL	(Spain) Tecnicar Motorsport	2	Chester Kieffer
Team Qatar	QMMF	(Spain) Drivex	3	Bader Al Sulaiti
Team Slovakia	SAMŠ	(Netherlands) MP Motorsport	4	Matúš Ryba
(United Kingdom) Team Great Britain	Motorsport UK	(Spain) Campos Racing	6	Reza Seewooruthun
Team Brazil	CBA	(Spain) Drivex	7	Matheus Comparatto
Team Malta	MMF	(Spain) GRS Team	8	Nicky Gauci
Team Serbia	AMSS	(Spain) Tecnicar Motorsport	10	Andrija Kostić
Team Portugal	FPAK	(Spain) Campos Racing	11	Francisco Macedo
Team Norway	KNA	(Spain) Drivex	12	Olav Vaa
Team Japan	JAF	(Spain) GRS Team	13	Tosei Moriyama
Team Hong Kong	HKAA	(Netherlands) MP Motorsport	14	Kaishun Liu
Team Austria	ÖAMTC	(Spain) Tecnicar Motorsport	15	Oscar Wurz
Team Chile	FADECH	—N/a	16	Giovanni Ramírez Pino
Team Peru	TACP	(Spain) Drivex	17	Andrés Cárdenas
Team Israel	ILAKA	(Spain) GRS Team	18	Ariel Elkin
Team Spain	RFEDA	(Netherlands) MP Motorsport	19	Juan Cota
Team Angola	FADM	(Spain) Tecnicar Motorsport	20	Lorenzo Campos
Team Czech Republic	ACCR	(Spain) Campos Racing	21	Max Karhan
Team Australia	Motorsport Australia	(Spain) GRS Team	23	Griffin Peebles
Team Greece	FFSA (Note: Despite representing Greece, Karras' car is entered by the national federation of France.)	(Netherlands) MP Motorsport	24	Philippe Armand Karras
Team Sri Lanka	CMSC	(Spain) Tecnicar Motorsport	25	Yevan David

== Results ==
=== Race ===
Pos.	No.	Driver	Team	Laps	Time	Gap	Grid
1st place, gold medalist(s)	19	Juan Cota	Team Spain	18	30:05.692	—	1
2nd place, silver medalist(s)	17	Andrés Cárdenas	Team Peru	18	30:07.027	+ 1.335	2
3rd place, bronze medalist(s)	6	Reza Seewooruthun	(United Kingdom) Team Great Britain	18	30:09.086	+ 3.394	4
4	18	Ariel Elkin	Team Israel	18	30:13.884	+ 8.192	6
5	13	Tosei Moriyama	Team Japan	18	30:14.398	+ 8.706	7
6	2	Chester Kieffer	Team Luxembourg	18	30:15.795	+ 10.103	17
7	23	Griffin Peebles	Team Australia	18	30:16.321	+ 10.629 ^{1}	8
8	10	Andrija Kostić	Team Serbia	18	30:16.709	+ 11.017	12
9	4	Matúš Ryba	Team Slovakia	18	30:18.194	+ 12.502 ^{1}	5
10	11	Francisco Macedo	Team Portugal	18	30:22.601	+ 16.909 ^{1}	20
11	25	Yevan David	Team Sri Lanka	18	30:23.493	+ 17.801 ^{2}	3
12	12	Olav Vaa	Team Norway	18	30:28.552	+ 22.860	16
13	8	Nicky Gauci	Team Malta	18	30:32.241	+ 26.549	14
14	7	Matheus Comparatto	Team Brazil	18	30:32.698	+ 27.006 ^{1}	13
15	14	Liu Kaishun	Team Hong Kong	18	31:09.258	+ 1:03.556 ^{2}	18
NC	24	Philippe Armand Karras	Team Greece	2	Accident damage		10
NC	21	Max Karhan	Team Czech Republic	1	Collision		9
NC	15	Oscar Wurz	Team Austria	1	Accident damage		11
DSQ	1	Gino Trappa	Team Argentina	18	Track Limits ^{3}		19
DSQ	3	Bader Al Sulaiti	Team Qatar	18	Track Limits ^{3}		21
DSQ	20	Lorenzo Campos	Team Angola	18	Track Limits ^{3}		15
Fastest lap: Andrés Cárdenas ( Team Peru) – 1:35.200 (Lap 8)

Notes

- ^1 Peebles, Ryba, Macedo and Comparatto received a 5-second penalty for exceeding track limits.
- ^2 David and Liu received a 15-second penalty for exceeding track limits.
- ^3 Trappa, Al Sulaiti and Campos were disqualified for penalty accumulation from exceeding track limits.
