= 2023 F4 Spanish Championship =

Motor racing season

The 2023 F4 Spanish Championship was the eighth season of the F4 Spanish Championship. It was a multi-event motor racing championship for open wheel, formula racing cars regulated according to FIA Formula 4 regulations, based in Spain. It was the second full season in which the series is partnered with the Richard Mille Young Talent Academy.

== Entry list ==
Team	No.	Driver	Class	Rounds
(United Kingdom) Rodin Carlin	2	(Australia) Noah Lisle		1–2, 4–7
(United Kingdom) Rodin Carlin	26	(Australia) Alex Ninovic	R	All
(United Kingdom) Rodin Carlin	71	(United Arab Emirates) Federico Al Rifai	R	All
(Spain) Campos Racing	3	(Mexico) Jesse Carrasquedo Jr.		All
(Spain) Campos Racing	8	(Italy) Matteo De Palo	R	All
(Spain) Campos Racing	17	(France) Enzo Deligny	R	All
(Spain) Campos Racing	18	(Peru) Andrés Cárdenas	R	2–7
(Spain) Campos Racing	23	(Singapore) Christian Ho		All
(Spain) Campos Racing	75	(Denmark) Noah Strømsted		All
(France) Saintéloc Racing	4	(Spain) Théophile Naël (Note: Naël is a French driver who competes under a Spanish licence.)		All
(France) Saintéloc Racing	7	(France) Luciano Morano		All
(France) Saintéloc Racing	30	(Denmark) Theodor Jensen		All
(France) Saintéloc Racing	31	(United Arab Emirates) Sebastian Murray	R	5
(Netherlands) MP Motorsport	5	(Italy) Alvise Rodella	R	All
(Netherlands) MP Motorsport	14	(United Arab Emirates) Keanu Al Azhari	R	All
(Netherlands) MP Motorsport	22	(Brazil) Pedro Clerot		All
(Netherlands) MP Motorsport	55	(Italy) Valerio Rinicella		All
(Netherlands) MP Motorsport	61	(Belgium) Thomas Strauven	R	4
(Netherlands) MP Motorsport	61	(Germany) Valentin Kluss		5
(Netherlands) MP Motorsport	61	(United Kingdom) Akshay Bohra	G	7
(Netherlands) MP Motorsport	66	(Colombia) Jerónimo Berrío		1–5
(Netherlands) MP Motorsport	66	(Netherlands) Reno Francot	G	6
(Netherlands) MP Motorsport	66	(Belgium) Dominique Dedecker	G	7
(Spain) Tecnicar - Fórmula de Campeones	6	(Japan) Hiyu Yamakoshi	R	2–3, 5–7
(Spain) Tecnicar - Fórmula de Campeones	6	(Mexico) Dewey Richards	R	4
(Spain) Tecnicar - Fórmula de Campeones	10	(Mexico) Lorenzo Castillo	R G	4–7
(Spain) Tecnicar - Fórmula de Campeones	19	(Spain) Eric Gené	R	All
(Spain) Tecnicar - Fórmula de Campeones	88	(Australia) Griffin Peebles	R	All
(Spain) Drivex	9	(Kyrgyzstan) Georgy Zhuravskiy (Note: Bolduev and Zhuravskiy are Russian, but they compete under a Spanish and a Kyrgyz licence respectively as Russian national emblems were banned by the FIA following the Russian invasion of Ukraine.)	R	1–5
(Spain) Drivex	13	(Spain) Daniel Nogales		1–3
(Spain) Drivex	13	(Colombia) Joao Paulo Diaz Balesteiro	R G	6
(Spain) Drivex	21	(Kazakhstan) Alexander Abkhazava	R	All
(Spain) Drivex	54	(Spain) Alexander Bolduev	R	1, 3
(Spain) Drivex	69	(Colombia) Maximiliano Restrepo	R	All
(Spain) Drivex	85	(Spain) Juan Cota	R	All
(Spain) GRS Team	11	(Thailand) Carl Bennett		1–5
(Spain) GRS Team	11	(Spain) Daniel Maciá		6–7
(Spain) GRS Team	28	(Spain) Daniel Maciá		1–2
(Spain) GRS Team	28	(United Kingdom) Isaac Barashi	R	4–7
(Spain) GRS Team	72	(Spain) Eloi González	R G	4
(Spain) GRS Team	72	(United Kingdom) Gabriel Stilp	R G	6
(Spain) GRS Team	72	(Mexico) Luis Carlos Pérez	G	7
(Spain) Monlau Motorsport	12	(France) Pablo Sarrazin		All
(Spain) Monlau Motorsport	33	(Brazil) Ricardo Gracia Filho		All
(Spain) Monlau Motorsport	41	(Brazil) Fernando Barrichello		All
(Spain) Monlau Motorsport	74	(Netherlands) Lin Hodenius	R	2–7
(Italy) Cram Motorsport	35	(Italy) Flavio Olivieri	R	All
(Italy) Cram Motorsport	36	(Italy) Alessandro Silvaggi	R	2–3
(Italy) Cram Motorsport	36	(India) Kai Daryanani	R	4–6
(Italy) Cram Motorsport	36	(Brazil) Gabriel Gomez	R G	7
(Italy) Cram Motorsport	37	(Brazil) Filippo Fiorentino	R G	6–7

Icon	Legend
R	Rookie
F	Female Trophy
G	Guest drivers ineligible to score points

- Eloi González was supposed to make his championship debut with Monlau Motorsport before entering the fourth round with GRS Team.

== Race calendar and results ==
The calendar was announced on 23 November 2022. The five rounds in Spain were organized by the RFEDA. The season opener at Circuit de Spa-Francorchamps was held in support of the 24H GT Series and the second abroad event took place at Circuito do Estoril.

Round		Circuit	Date	Pole position	Fastest lap	Winning driver	Winning team	Rookie winner	Supporting
1	R1	(Belgium) Circuit de Spa-Francorchamps, Stavelot	5 May	(Brazil) Pedro Clerot	(Singapore) Christian Ho	(Brazil) Pedro Clerot	(Netherlands) MP Motorsport	(United Arab Emirates) Keanu Al Azhari	Eurocup-3; 24H GT Series
1	R2	(Belgium) Circuit de Spa-Francorchamps, Stavelot	6 May	(United Arab Emirates) Keanu Al Azhari	(Singapore) Christian Ho	(Brazil) Pedro Clerot	(Netherlands) MP Motorsport	(France) Enzo Deligny	Eurocup-3; 24H GT Series
1	R3	(Belgium) Circuit de Spa-Francorchamps, Stavelot	7 May	(Italy) Valerio Rinicella	(Italy) Matteo De Palo	(Italy) Matteo De Palo (Note: Rinicella finished as the first but received a 5 seconds penalty for overtaking outside the track limits. De Palo inherited the win.)	(Spain) Campos Racing	(Italy) Matteo De Palo	Eurocup-3; 24H GT Series
2	R1	(Spain) MotorLand Aragón, Alcañiz	27 May	(Singapore) Christian Ho	(France) Enzo Deligny	(France) Enzo Deligny	(Spain) Campos Racing	(France) Enzo Deligny	Eurocup-3; RFEDA Racing Weekend
2	R2	(Spain) MotorLand Aragón, Alcañiz	28 May	(Singapore) Christian Ho	(France) Enzo Deligny	(Singapore) Christian Ho	(Spain) Campos Racing	(France) Enzo Deligny	Eurocup-3; RFEDA Racing Weekend
2	R3	(Spain) MotorLand Aragón, Alcañiz	28 May	(Italy) Matteo De Palo	(Spain) Théophile Naël	(Spain) Théophile Naël	(France) Saintéloc Racing	(France) Enzo Deligny	Eurocup-3; RFEDA Racing Weekend
3	R1	(Spain) Circuito de Navarra, Los Arcos	24 June	(Italy) Valerio Rinicella	(Italy) Valerio Rinicella	(Spain) Théophile Naël	(France) Saintéloc Racing	(United Arab Emirates) Keanu Al Azhari	RFEDA Racing Weekend
3	R2	(Spain) Circuito de Navarra, Los Arcos	25 June	(Spain) Théophile Naël	(Italy) Valerio Rinicella	(Spain) Théophile Naël	(France) Saintéloc Racing	(France) Enzo Deligny	RFEDA Racing Weekend
3	R3	(Spain) Circuito de Navarra, Los Arcos	25 June	(Italy) Valerio Rinicella	(Italy) Valerio Rinicella	(Italy) Valerio Rinicella	(Netherlands) MP Motorsport	(United Arab Emirates) Keanu Al Azhari	RFEDA Racing Weekend
4	R1	(Spain) Circuito de Jerez, Jerez de la Frontera	23 September	(Peru) Andrés Cárdenas	(Spain) Théophile Naël	(Spain) Théophile Naël	(France) Saintéloc Racing	(Peru) Andrés Cárdenas	Eurocup-3; RFEDA Racing Weekend
4	R2	(Spain) Circuito de Jerez, Jerez de la Frontera	24 September	(Peru) Andrés Cárdenas	(Peru) Andrés Cárdenas	(Peru) Andrés Cárdenas	(Spain) Campos Racing	(Peru) Andrés Cárdenas	Eurocup-3; RFEDA Racing Weekend
4	R3	(Spain) Circuito de Jerez, Jerez de la Frontera	24 September	(Spain) Théophile Naël	(Spain) Théophile Naël	(Spain) Théophile Naël	(France) Saintéloc Racing	(Peru) Andrés Cárdenas	Eurocup-3; RFEDA Racing Weekend
5	R1	(Portugal) Circuito do Estoril, Estoril	30 September	(Spain) Théophile Naël	(Spain) Théophile Naël	(Spain) Théophile Naël	(France) Saintéloc Racing	(France) Enzo Deligny	Eurocup-3; TCR Spain Touring Car Championship; Clásicos
5	R2	(Portugal) Circuito do Estoril, Estoril	1 October	(Spain) Théophile Naël	(Denmark) Noah Strømsted	(Spain) Théophile Naël	(France) Saintéloc Racing	(France) Enzo Deligny	Eurocup-3; TCR Spain Touring Car Championship; Clásicos
5	R3	(Portugal) Circuito do Estoril, Estoril	1 October	(Singapore) Christian Ho	(Brazil) Pedro Clerot	(France) Enzo Deligny	(Spain) Campos Racing	(France) Enzo Deligny	Eurocup-3; TCR Spain Touring Car Championship; Clásicos
6	R1	(Spain) Circuit Ricardo Tormo, Cheste	14 October	(Singapore) Christian Ho	(Italy) Valerio Rinicella	(Italy) Valerio Rinicella	(Netherlands) MP Motorsport	(France) Enzo Deligny	Eurocup-3; RFEDA Racing Weekend
6	R2	(Spain) Circuit Ricardo Tormo, Cheste	15 October	(Italy) Valerio Rinicella	(Spain) Théophile Naël	(Spain) Théophile Naël	(France) Saintéloc Racing	(Italy) Matteo De Palo	Eurocup-3; RFEDA Racing Weekend
6	R3	(Spain) Circuit Ricardo Tormo, Cheste	15 October	(Spain) Théophile Naël	(Singapore) Christian Ho	(Singapore) Christian Ho	(Spain) Campos Racing	(Italy) Matteo De Palo	Eurocup-3; RFEDA Racing Weekend
7	R1	(Spain) Circuit de Barcelona-Catalunya, Montmeló	11 November	(Singapore) Christian Ho	(Singapore) Christian Ho	(Singapore) Christian Ho	(Spain) Campos Racing	(France) Enzo Deligny	Eurocup-3; RFEDA Racing Weekend
7	R2	(Spain) Circuit de Barcelona-Catalunya, Montmeló	12 November	(Singapore) Christian Ho	(Singapore) Christian Ho	(Singapore) Christian Ho	(Spain) Campos Racing	(France) Enzo Deligny	Eurocup-3; RFEDA Racing Weekend
7	R3	(Spain) Circuit de Barcelona-Catalunya, Montmeló	12 November	(Singapore) Christian Ho	(Singapore) Christian Ho	(Singapore) Christian Ho	(Spain) Campos Racing	(Italy) Matteo De Palo	Eurocup-3; RFEDA Racing Weekend

== Championship standings ==
Points were awarded to the top ten classified finishers in 30-minute races and for the top nine classified finishers in 25-minute races.

Races	Position, points per race											
Races	**1st**	**2nd**	**3rd**	**4th**	**5th**	**6th**	**7th**	**8th**	**9th**	**10th**	**Pole**	**FL**
30-minute races	25	18	15	12	10	8	6	4	2	1	2	1
25-minute races	18	15	12	10	8	6	4	2	1			1

=== Drivers' championship ===
Pos	Driver	SPA (Belgium)			ARA (Spain)			NAV (Spain)			JER (Spain)			EST (Portugal)			CRT (Spain)			CAT (Spain)			Pts
Pos	Driver	R1	R2	R3	R1	R2	R3	R1	R2	R3	R1	R2	R3	R1	R2	R3	R1	R2	R3	R1	R2	R3	Pts
1	(Spain) Théophile Naël	7	3	6	5	3	1	1	**1**	3	1	4	**1**	**1**	**1**	Ret	2	1	**19**	3	18	2	314
2	(Singapore) Christian Ho	2	26	3	**2**	**1**	Ret	4	4	Ret	6	8	3	3	3	**2**	**3**	6	1	**1**	**1**	**1**	291
3	(Italy) Valerio Rinicella	19	2	**12**	4	7	7	**2**	3	**1**	5	3	2	6	14	3	1	**2**	7	2	3	3	256
4	(France) Enzo Deligny	22	4	16	1	2	2	Ret	2	Ret	3	2	6	2	2	1	5	4	4	4	2	DSQ	240
5	(Italy) Matteo De Palo	9	7	1	7	5	**3**	15	Ret	6	4	7	8	7	4	9	7	3	2	6	6	4	171
6	(Brazil) Pedro Clerot	**1**	1	2	10	4	6	5	6	5	12	28	10	4	5	5	22	9	24	13	4	17	151
7	(Denmark) Noah Strømsted	4	6	DNS	3	6	4	3	8	2	Ret	5	9	12	6	13	20	Ret	5	5	5	8	135
8	(Peru) Andrés Cárdenas				6	Ret	16	Ret	10	7	**2**	**1**	4	5	10	4	6	8	6	15	7	Ret	109
9	(United Arab Emirates) Keanu Al Azhari	3	**Ret**	4	30	8	5	6	5	4	9	13	5	14	7	19	13	7	8	10	11	6	100
10	(Australia) Alex Ninovic	5	Ret	10	11	10	11	8	7	8	14	29	Ret	10	9	26	8	5	3	32†	Ret	9	54
11	(Australia) Noah Lisle	6	5	Ret	13	20	Ret				8	6	7	30	24	6	9	11	11	9	30†	19	44
12	(Colombia) Jerónimo Berrío	8	8	5	12	25†	8	7	11	12	7	9	14	15	Ret	12							33
13	(Brazil) Ricardo Gracia Filho	13	11	21	14	9	9	23	9	10	11	10	Ret	9	11	15	4	10	15	7	Ret	14	25
14	(Japan) Hiyu Yamakoshi				9	DNS	Ret	Ret	14	Ret				8	19	10	14	12	9	8	17	7	19
15	(Spain) Juan Cota	18	18	18	24	28†	Ret	13	20	16	20	17	18	16	31	8	25	13	13	20	23	5	14
16	(Germany) Valentin Kluss													Ret	8	7							8
17	(Brazil) Fernando Barrichello	24	24	7	31†	22	Ret	24†	29	23	Ret	22	17	Ret	21	Ret	15	20	DSQ	18	Ret	Ret	6
18	(Spain) Daniel Nogales	10	20	8	Ret	27†	18	16	16	13													5
19	(Mexico) Jesse Carrasquedo Jr.	12	25	Ret	8	14	14	12	12	14	28†	11	12	20	Ret	14	18	31	20	27	19	25†	4
20	(Italy) Alvise Rodella	20	Ret	14	23	17	10	10	17	9	Ret	15	23	19	16	18	19	25	12	19	10	16	4
21	(Italy) Flavio Olivieri	Ret	22	11	22	Ret	20	Ret	24	17	Ret	24	19	24	20	17	24	Ret	Ret	Ret	8	10	3
22	(United Arab Emirates) Federico Al Rifai	23	9	9	28	11	23	21	21	18	18	18	16	13	12	11	27	14	14	30	20	Ret	3
23	(France) Pablo Sarrazin	21	16	Ret	19	12	27†	9	13	19	16	12	Ret	18	18	25	Ret	16	21	11	9	Ret	3
24	(Kazakhstan) Alexander Abkhazava	15	19	20	17	15	12	11	28	11	13	33†	15	Ret	22	Ret	10	17	10	22	24	Ret	2
25	(Australia) Griffin Peebles	17	17	17	15	13	15	18	18	20	10	14	25	26	17	16	26	27	16	23	16	13	1
26	(Spain) Daniel Maciá	11	10	Ret	WD	WD	WD										12	19	Ret	Ret	14	15	0
27	(Netherlands) Lin Hodenius				26	24	26†	20	26	25	29†	19	11	11	15	24	17	21	30	12	Ret	DNS	0
28	(France) Luciano Morano	16	13	15	16	19	13	14	19	21	21	32†	21	Ret	26	20	21	28	23	24	13	11	0
29	(Spain) Alexander Bolduev	Ret	12	Ret				WD	WD	WD													0
30	(Denmark) Theodor Jensen	28	14	19	18	26†	22	DNS	15	15	15	31	20	22	13	21	16	22	29	14	12	24†	0
31	(Spain) Eric Gené	25	21	13	21	18	17	19	23	Ret	22	16	22	17	23	22	23	24	Ret	17	26	23	0
32	(Belgium) Thomas Strauven										Ret	Ret	13										0
33	(Thailand) Carl Bennett	14	15	24†	20	16	19	17	22	22	26	20	Ret	27	29	Ret							0
34	(Kyrgyzstan) Georgy Zhuravskiy	26	23	22	25	Ret	21	22	25	24	17	Ret	24	25	Ret	Ret							0
35	(India) Kai Daryanani										19	23	28	29	25	23	29	23	22				0
36	(United Kingdom) Isaac Barashi										25	30	29	28	30	Ret	Ret	30	DSQ	25	21	22	0
37	(Colombia) Maximiliano Restrepo	27	27	23	27	23	25	Ret	27	DNS	27	21	Ret	23	27	Ret	28	Ret	26	29	29†	Ret	0
38	(Italy) Alessandro Silvaggi				29	21	24	WD	WD	WD													0
39	(United Arab Emirates) Sebastian Murray													21	28	Ret							0
40	(Mexico) Dewey Richards										23	25	30										0
Guest drivers ineligible to score points
–	(Netherlands) Reno Francot																11	15	17				–
–	(United Kingdom) Akshay Bohra																			21	15	12	–
–	(Brazil) Gabriel Gomez																			16	25	Ret	–
–	(United Kingdom) Gabriel Stilp																30	18	18				–
–	(Brazil) Filippo Fiorentino																Ret	29	25	31†	22	18	–
–	(Mexico) Lorenzo Castillo										24	26	26	WD	WD	WD	Ret	Ret	27	26	28	20	–
–	(Mexico) Luis Carlos Pérez																			28	27	21	–
–	(Colombia) Joao Paulo Diaz Balesteiro																Ret	26	28				–
–	(Spain) Eloi González										Ret	27	27										–
–	(Belgium) Dominique Dedecker																			WD	WD	WD	–
Pos	Driver	R1	R2	R3	R1	R2	R3	R1	R2	R3	R1	R2	R3	R1	R2	R3	R1	R2	R3	R1	R2	R3	Pts
Pos	Driver	SPA (Belgium)			ARA (Spain)			NAV (Spain)			JER (Spain)			EST (Portugal)			CRT (Spain)			CAT (Spain)			Pts

Colour	Result
Gold	Winner
Silver	Second place
Bronze	Third place
Green	Points classification
Blue	Non-points classification
Blue	Non-classified finish (NC)
Purple	Retired, not classified (Ret)
Red	Did not qualify (DNQ)
Red	Did not pre-qualify (DNPQ)
Black	Disqualified (DSQ)
White	Did not start (DNS)
White	Withdrew (WD)
White	Race cancelled (C)
Blank	Did not practice (DNP)
Blank	Did not arrive (DNA)
Blank	Excluded (EX)

**Bold** – Pole
Italics – Fastest Lap
† — Did not finish but classified
Rookie

=== Teams' standings ===
Two best finishers scored points for their team. Bonus points are not counted.

Pos	Team	Points
1	(Netherlands) MP Motorsport	460
2	(Spain) Campos Racing Drivers Development	458
3	(Spain) Campos Racing	409
4	(France) Saintéloc Racing	303
5	(United Kingdom) Rodin Carlin	101
6	(Netherlands) MP Motorsports	45
7	(Spain) Monlau Motorsport	34
8	(Spain) Drivex	21
9	(Spain) Tecnicar - Fórmula de Campeones	18
10	(Italy) Cram Motorsport	3
11	(Spain) GRS Team	0
12	(Spain) Drivex Academy	0
