= Andrés Cárdenas =

Peruvian and Colombian racing driver (born 2008)

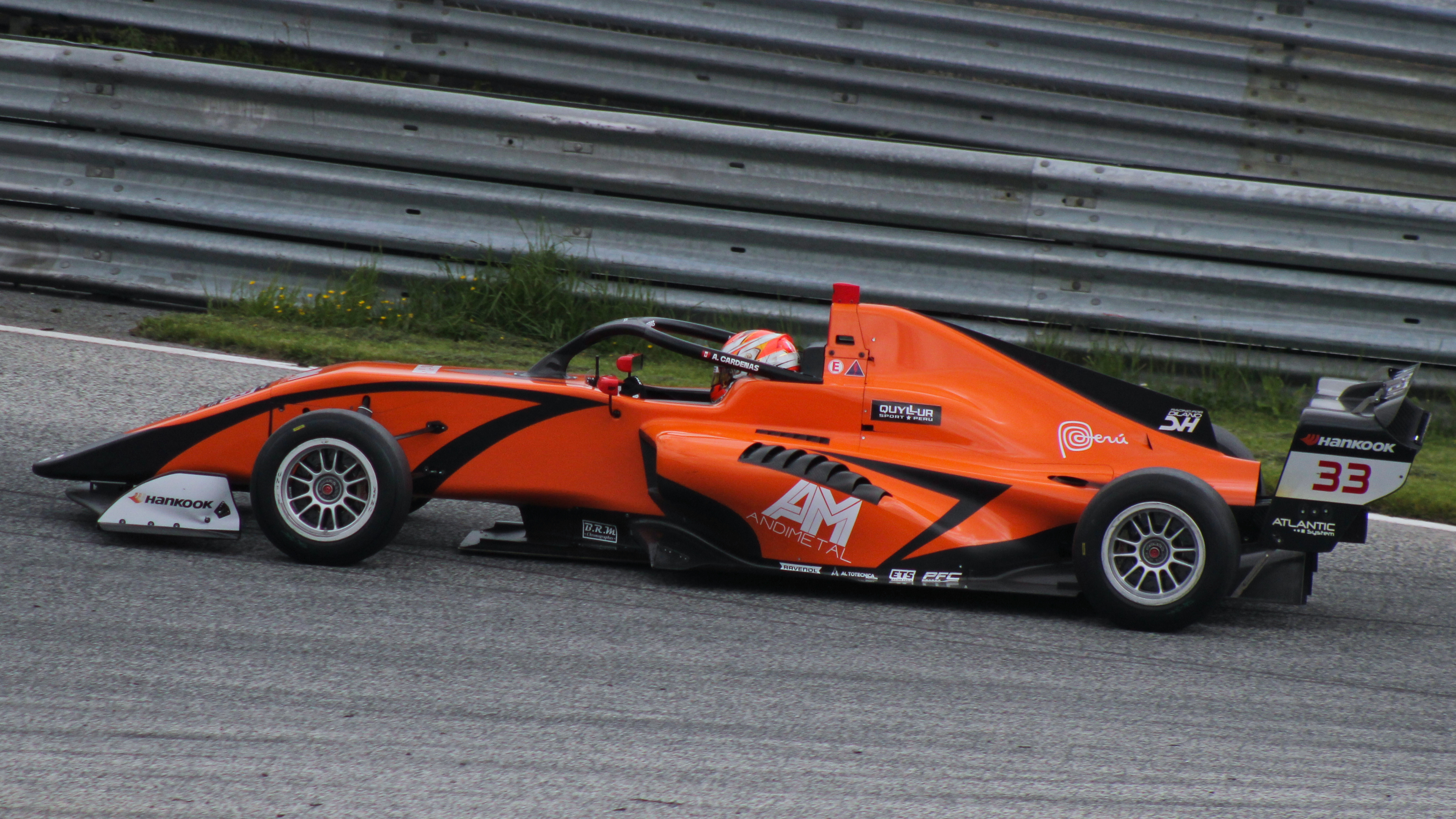
- Cárdenas driving at the Red Bull Ring during the 2025 Eurocup-3 season
- Nationality: (Peru) Peruvian
- Born: 15 May 2008 (age 18) Lima, Peru

Eurocup-3 career
- Debut season: 2025
- Current team: MP Motorsport
- Car number: 33
- Starts: 18
- Wins: 1
- Podiums: 2
- Poles: 1
- Fastest laps: 1
- Best finish: 7th in 2025

Previous series
- 2025 2023-2024 2024 2024: Eurocup-3 Spanish Winter; F4 Spanish Championship; Formula Winter Series; FIA Motorsport Games Formula 4 Cup
Medal record
Formula 4
Representing Peru
FIA Motorsport Games
Silver medal – second place	2024 Valencia	F4 Cup

Andrés Cárdenas (born 15 May 2008) is a Peruvian and Colombian racing driver currently competing in the 2026 USF Pro 2000 Championship for the Jay Howard Driver Development by ECR team. He has previously raced in Eurocup-3 for MP Motorsport, was the runner-up in the 2024 Formula Winter Series, and won a race in the F4 Spanish Championship.

== Career ==
=== Karting ===
Cárdenas made his competitive karting debut in 2017, where he competed in the Micro Max classes of the Rotax Max Challenge Peru, He actively competed in the Mini category, achieving notable results such as runner-up in the Rotax Max Challenge (RMC) Peru 2018 and National Champion of RMC Peru in 2019. At the continental level, he was runner-up in the 2018 Panamerican Rok Cup Challenge and also secured the runner-up position in the 2019 RMC South American Championship karting event he contested, Additionally, he participated in ROK the Rio 2018 in Las Vegas, finishing in 11th place.

Cárdenas made his WSK debut in 2019, where he karted in the Final Cup, Open Cup, Euro Series and the Super Master Series all in the 60 Mini class and racing for Tony Kart Racing Team. His only noted result was a 43rd in the Open Cup. Cárdenas also competed in the Rotax Max Challenge International Trophy in the Mini Max category with FLANDRIA KART, where he came in 9th. Finally, he contested the 24° South Garda Winter Cup to round off his season.

2020 was a better year for Cárdenas in the 60 Mini class, as he came 10th in the WSK Euro Series with Tony Kart Racing Team. He switched to Energy Corse where he contested the WSK Open Cup and came in 10th. Cárdenas participated in the 31° Andrea Margutti Trophy with Energy Corse Srl and finished in 13th.

Cárdenas moved up to the OK Junior category in 2021 and contested all of his events that year with Energy Corse. Cárdenas came 55th in the Champions of the Future, 14th in the WSK Final Cup – his only WSK karting event of the year – and 28th in the 26° South Garda Winter Cup. He also made his debut in the prestigious CIK-FIA European Championship, where he finished the championship in 46th.

Cárdenas' second year of OK Junior karting in 2022 was his most successful, where he first came runner-up in the Champions of the Future Winter Series with Energy Corse. He won his maiden karting title shortly after, winning the WSK Champions Cup with Energy Corse Srl.

Cárdenas' successful year didn't stop there, as after coming 27th in the X30 Junior category of the IAME Euro Series, he competed in both the OK Junior and OK class of the Champions of the Future, marking his debut in the OK category. Cárdenas adapted well to both categories and finished 6th in both of the classes. Around this time he was added to A14 Management, the management team of 2005 and 2006 Formula One World Champion Fernando Alonso.

Cárdenas came 35th in the CIK-FIA European Championship for Energy Corse and made his debut in the CIK-FIA World Championship where he raced for a different outfit, DPK Racing and finished in 17th.

In 2022, Cárdenas represented Peru at the 2nd FIA Motorsport Games held at the Circuit Paul Ricard in Marseille, France, where he won the gold medal in the Karting Sprint Junior category. This historic victory contributed to Peru receiving the Americas Winner and achieving a joint seventh-place ranking alongside Australia and Latvia among 72 participating nations. With these performances, Cárdenas exited karting with the intent of making his Formula 4 debut.

=== Formula 4 ===
==== 2023 ====
In early 2023, Cárdenas was confirmed to be joining Campos Racing for the 2023 F4 Spanish Championship, where he would miss the opening round due to age restrictions. He finished sixth in his first race, held at Aragón. Two rounds later at Jerez, Cárdenas dominated the field in qualifying, securing two pole positions. As a result, he took his first Spanish F4 victory in the second race of the round. He had a consistent end to the season, finishing outside the top ten on only two occasions for the remaining three rounds of the season, on his way to an impressive eighth in the standings.

==== 2024 ====
Cárdenas began his 2024 season in the 2024 Formula Winter Series with Campos Racing, getting a pole position, fastest lap and a win in the first race of the first round at Circuito de Jerez. He came third and fourth in the next two races.

Cárdenas began his second round at the Circuito Ricardo Tormo on pole position, as he too converted it into a win. In the second race he snatched another podium followed by a fifth place in the final race.

MotorLand Aragón – the third round of the series – was Cárdenas' worst yet, coming a low fourteenth in the first race, having his first retirement of the season in the second race but managed to salvage his weekend with a sixth place in the third race.

Despite the first race of the final round of the season at Circuit de Barcelona-Catalunya being cancelled, Cárdenas made the best of the second and third races as he got a second place in the both of them. With these performances, he placed runner-up in the championship with two wins, two pole positions, one fastest lap, six podiums and 152 points.

Joining the 2024 F4 Spanish Championship for a second season with Griffin Core by Campos Racing, Cárdenas hoped to replicate his Formula Winter Series successes, but it was far from reality: Cárdenas struggled and had a poor season, often failing to score points regularly, let alone a podium. His best results of the campaign were two sixth places, and finished the championship 14th in the drivers standings with 28 points.

=== Eurocup-3 ===
Cárdenas announced that he would be stepping to join the 2025 Eurocup-3 season, swapping Campos for MP Motorsport. He also competed with the team in the Eurocup-3 Spanish Winter Championship, winning the reverse grid race at MotorLand Aragón. With an additional podium in Portimão, He concluded the Winter Series securing 4th place in the overall standings and ranking as the 4th-best rookie of the season, with a total of 78 points.

=== USF Pro 2000 Championship ===
In October 2025, Cárdenas took part in a USF Pro 2000 test with Pabst Racing at the Indianapolis Motor Speedway.

== Karting record ==
=== Karting career summary ===
Season	Series	Team	Position
2017	Rotax Max Challenge Peru - Micro Max		2nd
2017	Rotax Max Challenge South America - Micro Max		2nd
2018	ROK the Rio - Mini ROK		11th
2019	WSK Final Cup - 60 Mini	Tony Kart Racing Team	
2019	WSK Open Cup - 60 Mini	Tony Kart Racing Team	43rd
2019	WSK Euro Series - 60 Mini	Tony Kart Racing Team	
2019	WSK Super Master Series - 60 Mini	Tony Kart Racing Team	
2019	Rotax Max Challenge International Trophy - Mini Max	FLANDRIA KART	9th
2019	24° South Garda Winter Cup - Mini ROK	Lennox Lamp	
2020	WSK Super Master Series - 60 Mini	Tony Kart Racing Team	
2020	WSK Euro Series - 60 Mini	Tony Kart Racing Team	10th
2020	WSK Open Cup - 60 Mini	Energy Corse	10th
2020	Andrea Margutti Trophy - 60 Mini	Energy Corse Srl	13th
2021	Champions of the Future - OK Junior	Energy Corse	55th
2021	WSK Final Cup - OK Junior	Energy Corse	14th
2021	26° South Garda Winter Cup - OK Junior	Energy Corse	28th
2021	CIK-FIA European Championship - OK Junior		46th
2022	Champions of the Future Winter Series - OK Junior	Energy Corse	2nd
2022	IAME Euro Series - X30 Junior	Energy Corse	27th
2022	Champions of the Future - OK	Energy Corse	6th
2022	CIK-FIA European Championship - OK Junior	Energy Corse	35th
2022	CIK-FIA World Championship - OK Junior	DPK Racing	17th
2022	WSK Champions Cup - OK Junior	Energy Corse Srl	1st
2022	Champions of the Future - OK Junior		6th
2022	FIA Motorsport Games Karting Sprint Cup - Junior	Team Peru	1st

== Racing record ==
=== Racing career summary ===
Season	Series	Team	Races	Wins	Poles	F/Laps	Podiums	Points	Position
2023	F4 Spanish Championship	Campos Racing	18	1	2	1	2	109	8th
2024	Formula Winter Series	Campos Racing	11	2	2	1	6	152	2nd
2024	F4 Spanish Championship	Griffin Core by Campos Racing	21	0	0	0	0	28	14th
2024	FIA Motorsport Games Formula 4 Cup	Team Peru	2	0	0	2	2	N/A	**2nd**
2025	Eurocup-3 Spanish Winter Championship	MP Motorsport	8	1	0	0	3	78	4th
2025	Eurocup-3	MP Motorsport	18	1	1	1	2	98	7th
2026	USF Pro 2000 Championship	Jay Howard Driver Development powered by ECR	18	1	2	1	6	279	6th

^{*} Season still in progress.

=== Complete F4 Spanish Championship results ===
(key) (Races in bold indicate pole position) (Races in italics indicate fastest lap)

Year	Team	1	2	3	4	5	6	7	8	9	10	11	12	13	14	15	16	17	18	19	20	21	DC	Points
2023	Campos Racing	SPA; 1	SPA; 2	SPA; 3	ARA; 1; 6	ARA; 2 Ret	ARA; 3; 16	NAV; 1 Ret	NAV; 2; 10	NAV; 3; 7	**JER**; **1**; 2	**JER**; **2**; 1	JER; 3; 4	EST; 1; 5	EST; 2; 10	EST; 3; 4	CRT; 1; 6	CRT; 2; 8	CRT; 3; 6	CAT; 1; 15	CAT; 2; 7	CAT; 3 Ret	8th	109
2024	Griffin Core by Campos Racing	JAR; 1; 11	JAR; 2; 6	JAR; 3 Ret	POR; 1; 10	POR; 2; 7	POR; 3; 16	LEC; 1 Ret	LEC; 2; 11	LEC; 3; 29	ARA; 1; 15	ARA; 2; 17	ARA; 3; 17	CRT; 1; 6	CRT; 2; 7	CRT; 3; 11	JER; 1; 19	JER; 2; 25	JER; 3; 12	CAT; 1; 8	CAT; 2; 9	CAT; 3 Ret	14th	28

=== Complete Formula Winter Series results ===
(key) (Races in bold indicate pole position; races in italics indicate fastest lap)

Year	Team	1	2	3	4	5	6	7	8	9	10	11	12	DC	Points
2024	Campos Racing	**JER**; **1**; 1	JER; 2; 3	JER; 3; 4	**CRT**; **1**; 1	CRT; 2; 2	CRT; 3; 5	ARA; 1; 14	ARA; 2 Ret	ARA; 3; 6	CAT; 1 C	CAT; 2; 2	CAT; 3; 2	2nd	152

=== Complete Eurocup-3 Spanish Winter Championship results ===
(key) (Races in bold indicate pole position) (Races in italics indicate fastest lap)

Year	Team	1	2	3	4	5	6	7	8	DC	Points
2025	MP Motorsport	JER; 1; 6	JER; 2; 1	JER; 3; 12	POR; 1; 3	POR; 2; 7	POR; 3; 7	ARA; 1; 4	ARA; 2; 3	4th	78

=== Complete Eurocup-3 results ===
(key) (Races in bold indicate pole position; races in italics indicate fastest lap)

Year	Team	1	2	3	4	5	6	7	8	9	10	11	12	13	14	15	16	17	18	DC	Points
2025	MP Motorsport	RBR; 1; 8	RBR; 2; 16	POR; 1; 8	POR; SR; 8	POR; 2; 12	LEC; 1; 8	LEC; SR; 11	LEC; 2; 24	MNZ; 1; 2	MNZ; 2; 7	ASS; 1; 4	ASS; 2; 11	SPA; 1; 6	SPA; 2; 13	JER; 1 Ret	JER; 2; 10	CAT; 1; 5	**CAT**; **2**; 1	7th	98

=== American open-wheel racing results ===
==== USF Pro 2000 Championship ====
(key) (Races in bold indicate pole position) (Races in italics indicate fastest lap) (Races with * indicate most race laps led)

Year	Team	1	2	3	4	5	6	7	8	9	10	11	12	13	14	15	16	17	18	Rank	Points
2026	Jay Howard Driver Development powered by ECR	ARL; 1; 4	ARL; 2; 13	**IMS**; **1**; 14	IMS; 2; 6	IRP; 12	**ROA**; **1**; 2"	ROA; 2; 3	MOH; 1; 7	MOH; 2; 2	MOH; 3; 3	POR; 1; 11	POR; 2; 14	MAR; 1; 3	MAR; 2; 1*	MIL; 8	ROA; 1; 17	ROA; 2; 17	ROA; 3; 16	6th	279
