= René Lammers =

Dutch racing driver (born 2008)

- Nationality: (Netherlands) Dutch
- Born: 13 July 2008 (age 18) Leiden, South Holland, Netherlands
- Relatives: Jan Lammers (father)

Eurocup-3 career
- Debut season: 2026
- Current team: MP Motorsport
- Car number: 99
- Starts: 19
- Wins: 1
- Podiums: 6
- Poles: 0
- Fastest laps: 0
- Best finish: 5th in 2026

Previous series
- 2026; 2025; 2024–2025; 2024: Eurocup-3 Spanish Winter; Eurocup-4 Spanish Winter; F4 Spanish; Formula Winter Series

René Lammers (Dutch pronunciation: [rəˈneː ˈlɑmərs]; born 12 July 2008) is a Dutch racing driver who last competed in Eurocup-3 for MP Motorsport.

Born and raised in Leiden, Lammers is the son of former Formula One driver and Le Mans winner Jan Lammers. After a successful karting career—culminating in his victory at the senior European Championship in 2023—Lammers graduated to junior formulae. Lammers stepped up to single-seaters in Spanish F4 in 2024, finishing fourth in 2025 after securing multiple victories.

== Career ==
=== Karting (2018–2023) ===
Lammers has had a very successful karting career, as in September 2020, he won his first major karting title, in the WSK Euro Series 60 Mini category. This was followed by victory in the same category in the Andrea Margutti Trophy. For 2021, Lammers stepped up to the X30 Junior and OK-Junior categories, as he won the Andrea Margutti Trophy again. For 2022, he stayed in the same category, having some more success by consistently finishing in the top-ten of championships. However, 2023 was his breakout season as he moved to the OK category, winning the Karting European Championship. Lammers also finished second in the Karting World Championship, driving for Parolin Motorsport.

=== Formula 4 (2024–2025) ===
==== 2024 ====
On 13 December 2023, Lammers announced his place as a competitor in the F4 Spanish Championship for 2024, where he would join MP Motorsport. Pre-season, Lammers joined the 2024 Formula Winter Series grid in preparation for his season in Spanish F4. He had a difficult season, only managing to finish 19th in the standings with a best result of sixth at MotorLand Aragón.

In his main campaign, Lammers started the season with a double points finish. However, points were hard to come by for Lammers that season, as after a fifth-place finish in Portimão, he was forced to wait until the Aragón round to score points. There, he had his best weekend, securing his first and only podium of the season during the second race. Collecting four more points finishes in the final three rounds, Lammers placed 13th in the standings, with 55 points.

==== 2025 ====
Lammers continued in Spanish F4 for 2025, remaining with MP Motorsport.

=== Formula Regional (2026–) ===
Lammers moved up to Eurocup-3 in 2026, continuing with MP Motorsport.

In September that year, Lammers also made an appearance in the Formula Regional European Championship with CL Motorsport, for a one-off round in Imola.

=== Formula One ===
In 2023, Lammers was crowned Scouting World Finals champion, and was offered a place in the Ferrari Driver Academy. However, he rejected Ferrari and made it clear he preferred to stay independent for as long as he is able to in his climb to Formula 1.

== Personal life ==
Lammers' father is Jan Lammers, a former Formula One driver and winner of the 1988 24 Hours of Le Mans with Silk Cut Jaguar. Lammers' career is managed by two-time Formula One world champion Fernando Alonso, via his agency A14 Management.

== Karting record ==
=== Karting career summary ===
Season	Series	Team	Position
2018	IAME International Open — X30 Mini	Falcon Kart	8th
2018	IAME International Final — X30 Mini	Falcon Kart	24th
2019	IAME Winter Cup — X30 Mini	PBD Racing Team	14th
2019	WSK Champions Cup - Final B — 60 Mini	PBD Racing Team	16th
2019	WSK Super Master Series — 60 Mini	PBD Racing Team	98th
2019	WSK Euro Series — 60 Mini	PBD Racing Team	120th
2019	IAME Euro Series — X30 Mini	PBD Racing Team	9th
2019	WSK Open Cup — 60 Mini	PBD Racing Team	26th
2019	WSK Final Cup — 60 Mini	PBD Racing Team	9th
2019	IAME Series Benelux — X30 Mini	PBD Racing Team	7th
2019	IAME International Final — X30 Mini	Falcon Kart	28th
2020	Winter Cup — Mini ROK	Baby Race Driver Academy	16th
2020	WSK Champions Cup — 60 Mini	Baby Race Driver Academy	7th
2020	WSK Super Master Series — 60 Mini	Baby Race Driver Academy	5th
2020	South Garda Winter Cup — Mini ROK	Baby Race Driver Academy	16th
2020	Trofeo d’Autunno — Mini GR3	Baby Race Driver Academy	1st
2020	Andrea Margutti Trophy — 60 Mini	Baby Race Driver Academy	1st
2020	Trofeo Ayrton Senna — 60 Mini	Baby Race Driver Academy	2nd
2020	WSK Euro Series — 60 Mini	Baby Race Driver Academy	1st
2020	WSK Open Cup - 60 Mini	Baby Race Driver Academy	3rd
2020	ROK Cup International Final - Mini Rok	Baby Race Driver Academy	20th
2021	WSK Champions Cup — 60 Mini	Baby Race Driver Academy	1st
2021	WSK Super Master Series — 60 Mini	Baby Race Driver Academy	1st
2021	Trofeo Grifone — Mini GR3	Baby Race Driver Academy	1st
2021	Andrea Margutti Trophy — X30 Junior	Baby Race Driver Academy	1st
2021	WSK Euro Series — 60 Mini	Baby Race Driver Academy	27th
2021	Trofeo delle Industrie — X30 Junior	Parolin Racing	30th
2021	WSK Euro Series - OKJ	Parolin Racing	46th
2021	Italian Championship - X30 Junior		5th
2021	Champions of the Future — OKJ	Parolin Motorsport	110th
2021	CIK-FIA European Championship — OKJ	Parolin Motorsport	NC
2021	CIK-FIA World Championship — OKJ	Parolin Motorsport	20th
2021	WSK Open Cup — OKJ	Parolin Motorsport	28th
2021	WSK Final Cup — OKJ	Parolin Motorsport	8th
2022	Champions of the Future Winter Series — OKJ	Parolin Motorsport	30th
2022	Trofeo delle Industrie — OKJ	Parolin Motorsport	5th
2022	WSK Super Master Series — OKJ	Parolin Motorsport	8th
2022	WSK Euro Series — OKJ	Parolin Motorsport	9th
2022	Champions of the Future — OKJ	Parolin Motorsport	5th
2022	Champions of the Future — OK	Parolin Motorsport	5th
2022	CIK-FIA European Championship — OKJ	Parolin Motorsport	8th
2022	CIK-FIA World Championship — OKJ	Parolin Motorsport	5th
2022	WSK Open Cup — OKJ	Parolin Motorsport	20th
2022	WSK Final Cup — OK	Parolin Motorsport	20th
2023	WSK Super Master Series — OK	Parolin Motorsport	3rd
2023	WSK Euro Series — OK	Parolin Motorsport	15th
2023	Champions of the Future — OK	Parolin Motorsport	11th
2023	CIK-FIA European Championship — OK	Parolin Motorsport	1st
2023	CIK-FIA World Championship — OK	Parolin Motorsport	2nd

== Racing record ==
=== Racing career summary ===
Season	Series	Team	Races	Wins	Poles	F/Laps	Podiums	Points	Position
2024	Formula Winter Series	MP Motorsport	11	0	0	0	0	14	19th
2024	F4 Spanish Championship	MP Motorsport	21	0	0	0	1	55	13th
2025	Eurocup-4 Spanish Winter Championship	MP Motorsport	9	1	0	1	3	76	**3rd**
2025	F4 Spanish Championship	MP Motorsport	21	4	0	1	9	221	4th
2026	Eurocup-3 Spanish Winter Championship	MP Motorsport	9	0	0	2	5	83	**3rd**
2026	Eurocup-3	MP Motorsport	19	1	1	0	6	191	5th
2026	Formula Regional European Championship	CL Motorsport	3	0	0	0	0	0	32nd
2027	FIA Formula 3 Championship	MP Motorsport	Reserve driver						

* Season still in progress.

=== Complete Formula Winter Series results ===
(key) (Races in bold indicate pole position; races in italics indicate fastest lap)

Year	Team	1	2	3	4	5	6	7	8	9	10	11	12	DC	Points
2024	MP Motorsport	JER; 1; 13	JER; 2; 16	JER; 3; 16	CRT; 1; 14	CRT; 2; 9	CRT; 3; 18	ARA; 1; 6	ARA; 2; 15	ARA; 3; 8	CAT; 1 C	CAT; 2; 16	CAT; 3; 20	19th	14

=== Complete F4 Spanish Championship results ===
(key) (Races in bold indicate pole position; races in italics indicate fastest lap)

Year	Team	1	2	3	4	5	6	7	8	9	10	11	12	13	14	15	16	17	18	19	20	21	DC	Points
2024	MP Motorsport	JAR; 1; 6	JAR; 2; 8	JAR; 3; 11	POR; 1; 5	POR; 2 Ret	POR; 3; 15	LEC; 1; 11	LEC; 2; 16	LEC; 3; 19	ARA; 1; 5	ARA; 2; 3	ARA; 3; 11	CRT; 1; 8	CRT; 2; 9	CRT; 3 Ret	JER; 1; 7	JER; 2; 12	JER; 3; 20	CAT; 1 Ret	CAT; 2; 7	CAT; 3; 18	13th	55
2025	MP Motorsport	ARA; 1; 2	ARA; 2; 6	ARA; 3; 2	NAV; 1; 2	NAV; 2; 1	NAV; 3; 1	POR; 1 Ret	POR; 2; 11	POR; 3; 6	LEC; 1; 5	LEC; 2; 4	LEC; 3; 15	JER; 1; 20	JER; 2; 1	JER; 3; 2	CRT; 1; 4	CRT; 2; 2	CRT; 3; 1	CAT; 1; 29	CAT; 2; 31†	CAT; 3; 12	4th	221

=== Complete Eurocup-4 Spanish Winter Championship results ===
(key) (Races in bold indicate pole position) (Races in italics indicate fastest lap)

Year	Team	1	2	3	4	5	6	7	8	9	DC	Points
2025	MP Motorsport	JER; 1; 7	JER; 2; 1	JER; 3; 3	POR; 1; 12	POR; 2; 6	POR; 3; 8	NAV; 1; 5	NAV; 2; 9	NAV; 3; 3	3rd	76

=== Complete Eurocup-3 Spanish Winter Championship results ===
(key) (Races in bold indicate pole position) (Races in italics indicate fastest lap)

Year	Team	1	2	3	4	5	6	7	8	9	DC	Points
2026	MP Motorsport	POR; 1; 3	POR; 2 Ret	POR; 3; 3	JAR; 1; 3	JAR; 2; 14	JAR; 3; 17	ARA; 1; 3	ARA; 2; 2	ARA; 3; 4	3rd	83

=== Complete Eurocup-3 results ===
(key) (Races in bold indicate pole position; races in italics indicate fastest lap)

Year	Team	1	2	3	4	5	6	7	8	9	10	11	12	13	14	15	16	17	18	19	DC	Points
2026	MP Motorsport	LEC; 1; 2	LEC; SR; 24	LEC; 2; 4	POR; 1; 2	POR; 2; 9	IMO; 1; 8	IMO; SR; 13	IMO; 2; 9	MNZ; 1; 3	MNZ; 2; 2	SIL; 1; 2	SIL; 2; 4	JER; 1; 5	JER; SR; 6	**JER**; **2**; 1	HUN; 1; 7	HUN; 2; 25	CAT; 1; 4	CAT; 2; 4	5th	191

=== Complete Formula Regional European Championship results ===
(key) (Races in bold indicate pole position) (Races in italics indicate fastest lap)

Year	Team	1	2	3	4	5	6	7	8	9	10	11	12	13	14	15	16	17	18	19	20	DC	Points
2026	CL Motorsport	RBR; 1	RBR; 2	RBR; 3	ZAN; 1	ZAN; 2	SPA; 1	SPA; 2	SPA; 3	MNZ; 1	MNZ; 2	MNZ; 3	HUN; 1	HUN; 2	LEC; 1	LEC; 2	IMO; 1 Ret	IMO; 2; 12	IMO; 3 Ret	HOC; 1	HOC; 2	32nd	0
