= Patrick Heuzenroeder =

Australian racing driver (born 2005)

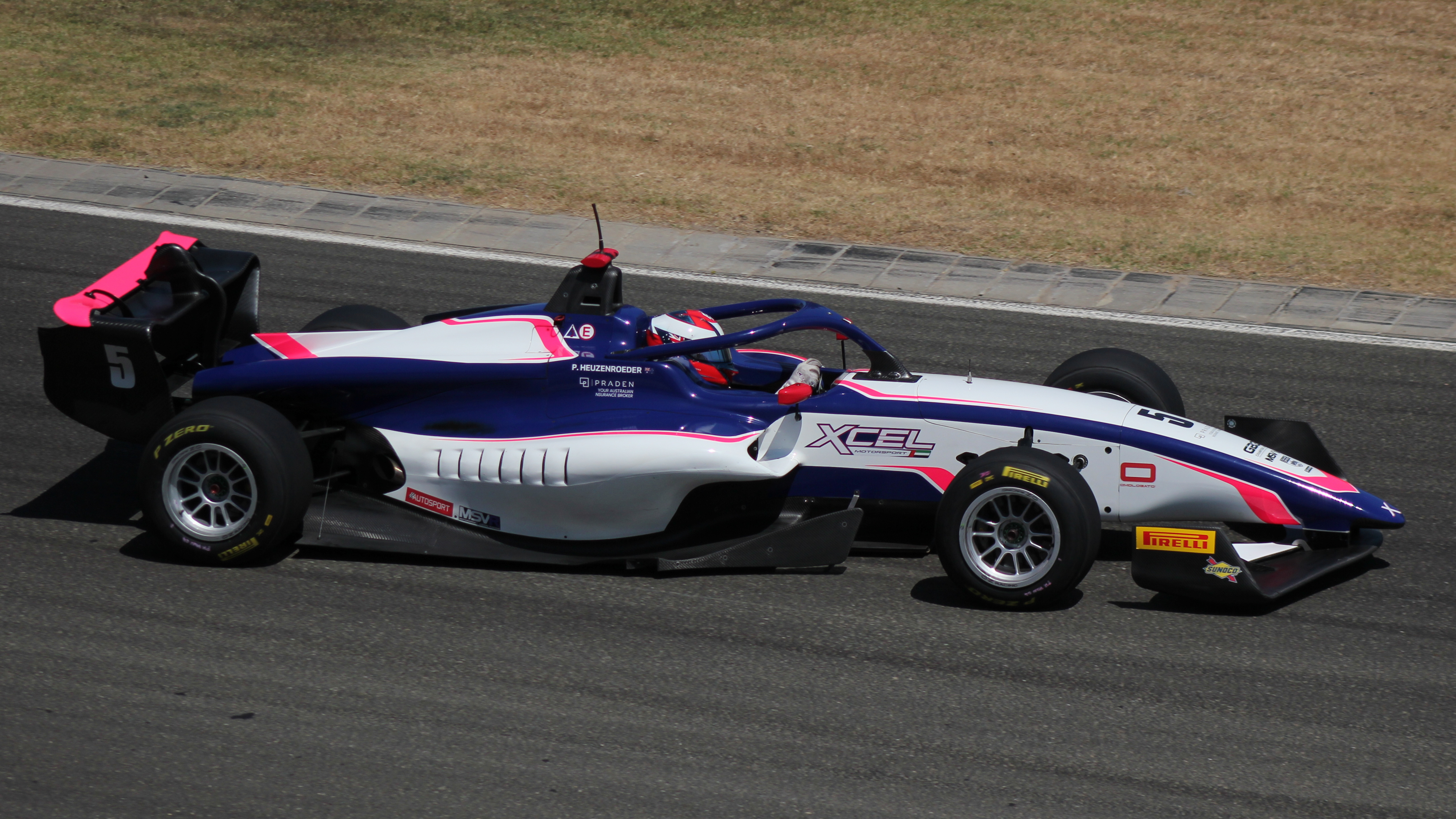
- Heuzenroeder at the Hungaroring in 2025
- Nationality: Australia
- Born: 17 November 2005 (age 20) Sydney, New South Wales, Australia

Eurocup-3 career
- Debut season: 2026
- Car number: 5
- Former teams: Griffin Core by Campos
- Starts: 12
- Wins: 1
- Podiums: 1
- Poles: 0
- Fastest laps: 0
- Best finish: 12th in 2026

Previous series
- 2026; 2026; 2025; 2023–2025; 2023; 2023; 2022: FIA Formula 3; Eurocup-3 Spanish Winter; FR Oceania; GB3; F4 British; Formula Winter Series; Australian Formula Ford

Patrick Heuzenroeder (born 17 November 2005) is an Australian racing driver who last competed in Eurocup-3 for Griffin Core by Campos.

Heuzenroeder is the 2025 GB3 vice-champion for Xcel Motorsport.

== Career ==
=== Karting (2018–2022) ===
Heuzenroeder first expressed an interest in motorsport when he visited Sydney's Eastern Creek go-kart circuit at the age of 13. He would then kart for the next three years, including an appearance in the Australian Kart Championship in 2022.

=== Formula Ford (2022) ===
Heuzenroeder competed in seven races of the 2022 Formula Ford Australian Championship as he moved up to car racing. He also competed in the New South Wales championship, where he finished third after being in contention for the championship but missing the last round. After some impressive performances in Formula Ford, Heuzenroeder joined the Ferrari Driver Academy Asia/Pacific trials, where he narrowly missed out on a place in the final.

=== Formula 4 (2023) ===
In late 2022, Heuzenroeder moved to the UK to compete in the 2023 F4 British Championship with Phinsys by Argenti. He contested one round of the Formula Winter Series with the team prior to the full season in British F4. Heuzenroeder made his debut in the championship at Donington Park, scoring points in race three. He secured his only podium at the reverse-grid race at Snetterton. Heuzenroeder ended the season in 19th in the standings, with 37 points to his name.

=== Formula Regional (2024–) ===
==== 2024 ====
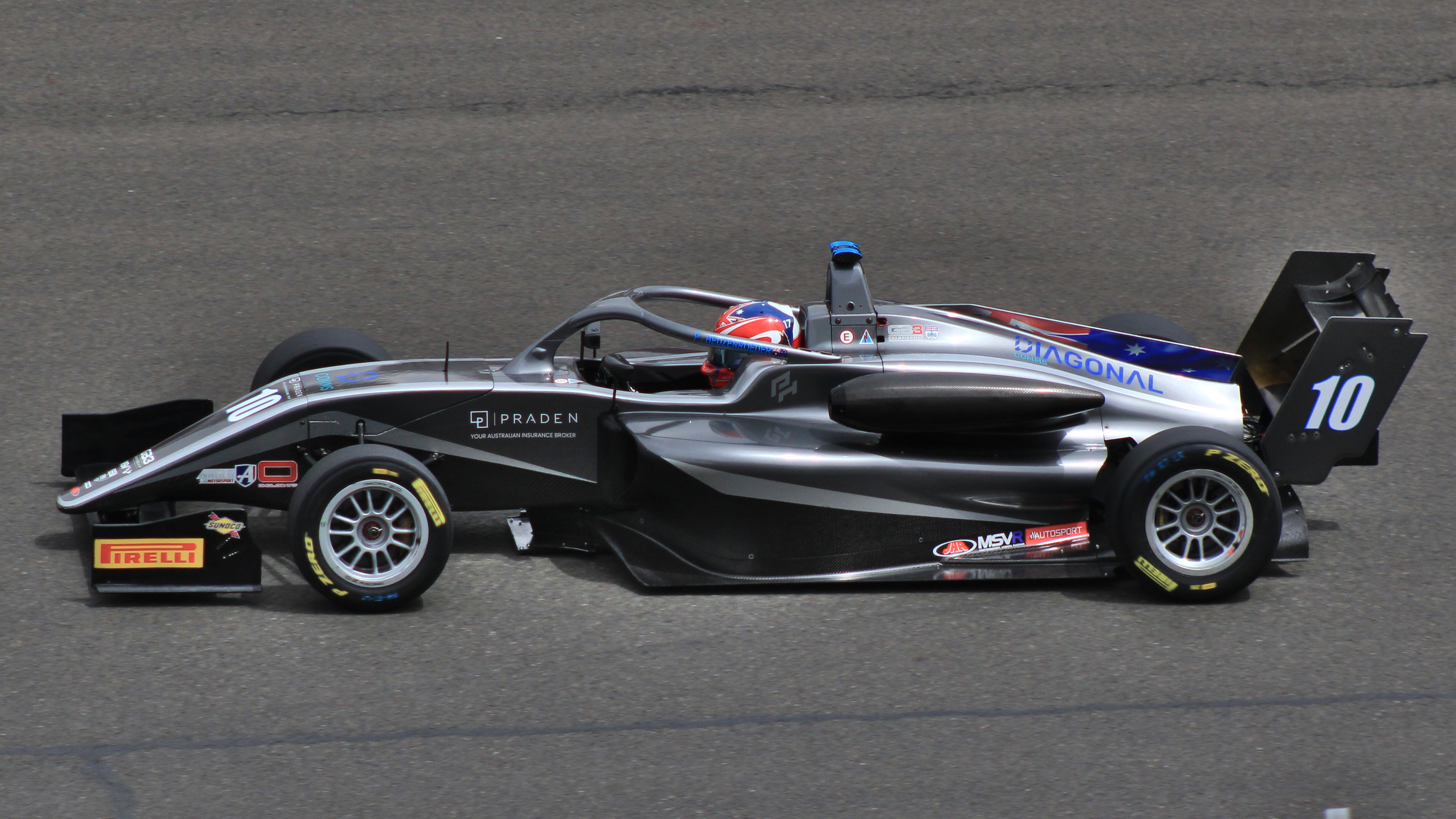
Heuzenroeder driving at the Hungaroring in 2024

In 2024, it was announced that Heuzenroeder would join the grid for the 2024 GB3 Championship, joining reigning champions JHR Developments. He managed to finish 12th in the drivers' standings, with a best result of third at the reverse grid race in round 5 at Circuit Zandvoort.

==== 2025 ====
During pre-season, Heuzenroeder competed in the Formula Regional Oceania Championship with mtec Motorsport.

Heuzenroeder remained in GB3 for 2025, switching to Xcel Motorsport.

==== 2026 ====
At the start of the year, Heuzenroeder competed in the Eurocup-3 winter series with Campos Racing.

For his main campaign, Heuzenroeder moved to Eurocup-3 with Campos.

=== FIA Formula 3 (2026) ===
At the start of 2026, Heuzenroeder deputised for an injured Ernesto Rivera at Campos Racing during Barcelona pre-season testing. He would continue to replace Rivera for the season-opening Australia round.

== Personal life ==
Heuzenroeder is mentored by Le Mans winner and former Formula One driver David Brabham.

== Karting record ==
=== Karting career summary ===
Season	Series	Position
2020	Dash For Cash - Junior Light	5th
2021	Kartshed ACT Titles - Junior Light	11th
2021	Natural Gas & Water SSS Canberra - Juniors	22nd
2022	Australian Kart Championship - TAG 125	47th
Sources: 2

== Racing record ==
=== Racing career summary ===
Season	Series	Team	Races	Wins	Poles	F/Laps	Podiums	Points	Position
2022	Australian Formula Ford Championship	Anglo Motorsport	7	0	0	0	0	N/A	NC
2022	Formula Ford New South Wales Championship	Anglo Motorsport	?	?	?	?	?	?	**3rd**
2023	Formula Winter Series	Phinsys by Argenti	2	0	0	0	0	0	19th
2023	F4 British Championship	Phinsys by Argenti	30	0	0	0	1	37	19th
2023	GB3 Championship	Elite Motorsport	6	0	0	0	1	21	26th
2024	GB3 Championship	JHR Developments	23	0	0	0	1	189	12th
2025	Formula Regional Oceania Championship	mtec Motorsport	15	1	1	1	4	264	4th
2025	Tasman Series	mtec Motorsport	6	0	0	0	0	102	**3rd**
2025	GB3 Championship	Xcel Motorsport	24	1	1	3	5	376	**2nd**
2026	Eurocup-3 Spanish Winter Championship	Campos Racing	9	0	0	0	0	31	9th
2026	Eurocup-3	Campos Racing	12	1	0	0	1	51	12th
2026	FIA Formula 3 Championship	Campos Racing	2	0	0	0	0	0	32nd

* Season still in progress.

=== Complete Formula Winter Series results ===
(key) (Races in bold indicate pole position; races in italics indicate fastest lap)

Year	Team	1	2	3	4	5	6	7	8	DC	Points
2023	Phinsys by Argenti	JER; 1	JER; 2	CRT; 1; 13	CRT; 2; 11	NAV; 1	NAV; 2	CAT; 2	CAT; 2	19th	0

=== Complete F4 British Championship results ===
(key) (Races in bold indicate pole position; races in italics indicate fastest lap)

Year	Team	1	2	3	4	5	6	7	8	9	10	11	12	13	14	15	16	17	18	19	20	21	22	23	24	25	26	27	28	29	30	31	DC	Points
2023	Phinsys by Argenti	DPN; 1; 14	DPN; 2; 9	DPN; 3; 7	BHI; 1; 11	BHI; 2; 18	BHI; 3; 11	SNE; 1 C	SNE; 2; 3^{3}	SNE; 3; 13	THR; 1 Ret	THR; 2 Ret	THR; 3; 17	OUL; 1; 7	OUL; 2; 6^{3}	OUL; 3 Ret	SIL; 1; 9	SIL; 2; 8^{1}	SIL; 3; 14	CRO; 1; 13	CRO; 2; 17	CRO; 3 Ret	KNO; 1 Ret	KNO; 2; 9	KNO; 3; 9	DPGP; 1 Ret	DPGP; 2; 11	DPGP; 3 Ret	DPGP; 4; 16	BHGP; 1; 6	BHGP; 2; 17	BHGP; 3; 11	19th	37

=== Complete GB3 Championship results ===
(key) (Races in bold indicate pole position) (Races in italics indicate fastest lap)

Year	Team	1	2	3	4	5	6	7	8	9	10	11	12	13	14	15	16	17	18	19	20	21	22	23	24	DC	Points
2023	Elite Motorsport	OUL; 1	OUL; 2	OUL; 3	SIL1; 1	SIL1; 2	SIL1; 3	SPA; 1	SPA; 2	SPA; 3	SNE; 1	SNE; 2	SNE; 3	SIL2; 1	SIL2; 2	SIL2; 3	BRH; 1	BRH; 2	BRH; 3	ZAN; 1; 21	ZAN; 2; 22	ZAN; 3 Ret	DON; 1; 18	DON; 2; 18	DON; 3; 3	26th	21
2024	JHR Developments	OUL; 1; 11	OUL; 2; 9	OUL; 3 Ret	SIL1; 1; 11	SIL1; 2; 15	SIL1; 3 C	SPA; 1; 13	SPA; 2 Ret	SPA; 3; 14^{6}	HUN; 1; 8	HUN; 2; 4	HUN; 3; 5^{1}	ZAN; 1; 19	ZAN; 2; 5	ZAN; 3; 3	SIL2; 1; 16	SIL2; 2; 12	SIL2; 3; 8	DON; 1; 18	DON; 2; 15	DON; 3; 18	BRH; 1; 17	BRH; 2; 11	BRH; 3; 6	12th	189
2025	Xcel Motorsport	SIL1; 1; 11	SIL1; 2; 7	SIL1; 3; 2^{2}	**ZAN**; **1**; 1	ZAN; 2; 2	ZAN; 3; 7^{3}	SPA; 1; 7	SPA; 2; 12	SPA; 3; 4	HUN; 1; 5	HUN; 2; 8	HUN; 3; 6	SIL2; 1; 6	SIL2; 2; 2	SIL2; 3; 12	BRH; 1; 4	BRH; 2; 4	BRH; 3 Ret	DON; 1; 4	DON; 2; 4	DON; 3 Ret	MNZ; 1; 2	MNZ; 2 Ret	MNZ; 3; 6^{4}	2nd	376

=== Complete Formula Regional Oceania Championship results ===
(key) (Races in bold indicate pole position) (Races in italics indicate fastest lap)

Year	Team	1	2	3	4	5	6	7	8	9	10	11	12	13	14	15	DC	Points
2025	mtec Motorsport	TAU; 1; 9	TAU; 2; 8	TAU; 3; 4	HMP; 1; 5	HMP; 2; 4	HMP; 3; 6	MAN; 1; 3	MAN; 2; 7	MAN; 3; 3	TER; 1; 4	TER; 2; 3	TER; 3; 4	**HIG**; **1**; 1	HIG; 2 Ret	HIG; 3 Ret	4th	264

=== Complete Eurocup-3 Spanish Winter Championship results ===
(key) (Races in bold indicate pole position) (Races in italics indicate fastest lap)

Year	Team	1	2	3	4	5	6	7	8	9	DC	Points
2026	Campos Racing	POR; 1; 5	POR; SPR; Ret	POR; 2; 15	JAR; 1; 17	JAR; SPR; 6	JAR; 2; 7	ARA; 1; 5	ARA; SPR; 25†	ARA; 2 Ret	9th	31

=== Complete FIA Formula 3 Championship results ===
(key) (Races in bold indicate pole position) (Races in italics indicate fastest lap)

Year	Entrant	1	2	3	4	5	6	7	8	9	10	11	12	13	14	15	16	17	18	19	DC	Points
2026	Campos Racing	MEL; SPR; 23	MEL; FEA; 17	MON; SPR	MON; FEA	CAT; SPR	CAT; FEA	RBR; SPR	RBR; FEA	SIL; SPR	SIL; FEA	SPA; SPR	SPA; FEA	HUN; SPR	HUN; FEA	MNZ; SPR	MNZ; FEA	MAD; SPR	MAD; FEA1	MAD; FEA2	32nd	0

=== Complete Eurocup-3 results ===
(key) (Races in bold indicate pole position; races in italics indicate fastest lap)

Year	Team	1	2	3	4	5	6	7	8	9	10	11	12	13	14	15	16	17	18	19	DC	Points
2026	Griffin Core	LEC; 1; 27	LEC; SR; 13	LEC; 2; 10	POR; 1; 22	POR; 2; 6	IMO; 1; 4	IMO; SR; 1	IMO; 2; 18	MNZ; 1; 5	MNZ; 2; 17	SIL; 1; 29†	SIL; 2; 5	JER; 1	JER; SR	JER; 2	HUN; 1	HUN; 2	CAT; 1	CAT; 2	12th	51
