= Keanu Al Azhari =

Emirati-German racing driver (born 2007)

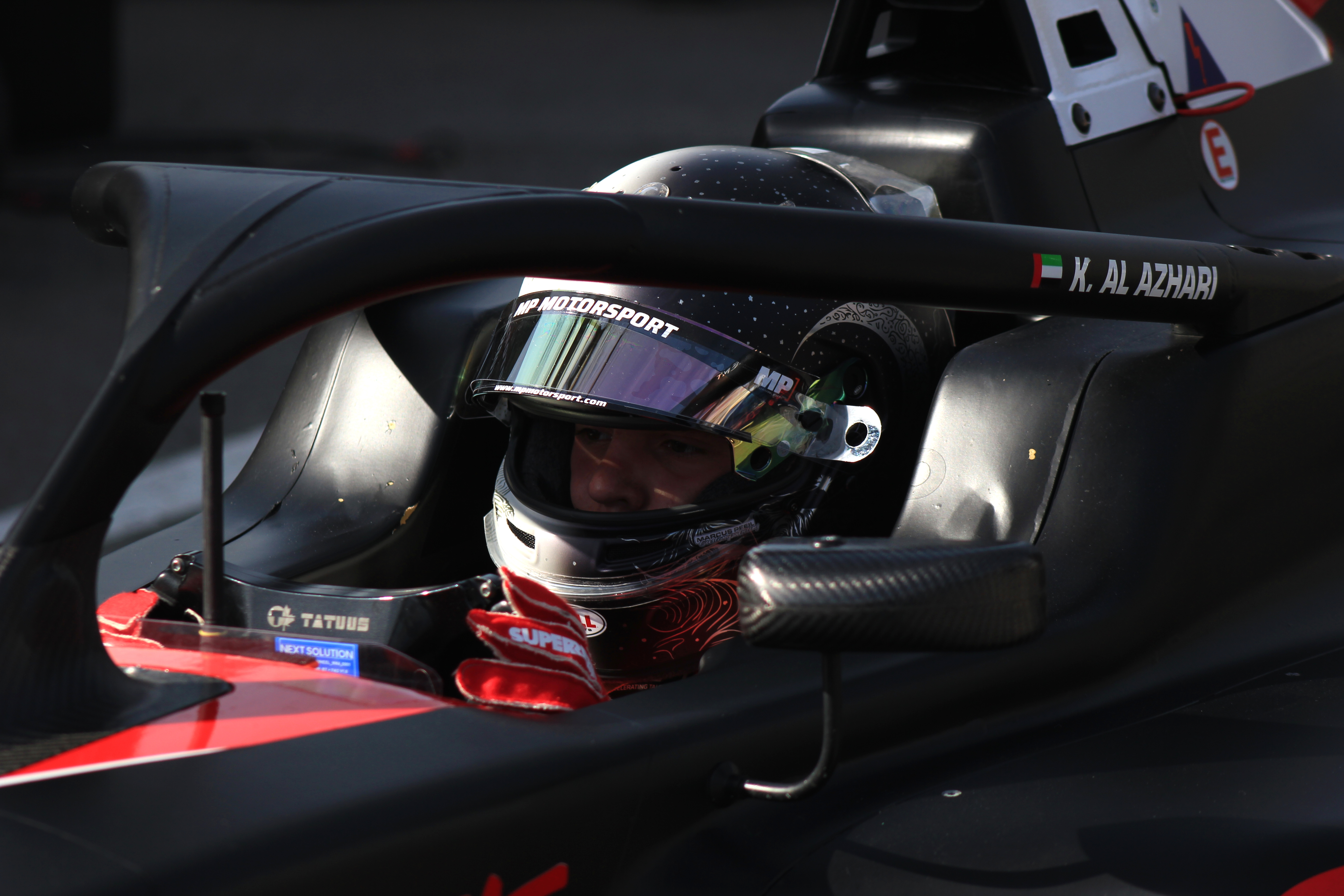
- Al Azhari in 2023
- Nationality: (United Arab Emirates) Emirati
- Born: 14 November 2007 (age 19) Dubai, United Arab Emirates
- Relatives: Adam Al Azhari (brother)

Eurocup-3 career
- Debut season: 2026
- Current team: Hitech
- Categorisation: FIA Silver
- Car number: 14
- Starts: 19
- Wins: 4
- Podiums: 8
- Poles: 4
- Fastest laps: 5
- Best finish: 2nd in 2026

Previous series
- 2026 2026 2025 2025 2024–2025 2024 2023–24 2023–2024 2023–2024: Eurocup-3; Eurocup-3 Spanish Winter; GB3; GT Winter Series; Prototype Cup Germany; Formula Winter Series; Middle East Trophy; F4 Spanish; F4 UAE

Keanu Al Azhari (born 14 November 2007) is an Emirati racing driver of German descent, who is set to compete in the FIA Formula 3 Championship with Hitech as part of the Alpine Academy.

Al Azhari is the 2026 Eurocup-3 Spanish Winter champion, and was third in the 2024 Formula 4 UAE Championship, as well as the 2024 F4 Spanish and 2026 Eurocup-3 runner-up. He was also a race winner in GB3 in 2025, placing sixth.

== Career ==
=== Karting (2017–2022) ===
Al Azhari has had a consistent karting career, but has not amassed any major karting titles in Europe. However, in his home country he was able to secure the IAME X30 Junior title in the 2020–21 season. In the previous year, Al Azhari finished runner up in the same category.

=== Formula 4 (2023–2024) ===
==== 2023 ====
Al Azhari began his racing career in the 2023 Formula 4 UAE Championship for Yas Heat Racing Academy. He managed to score two podiums during the campaign, on his way to seventh in the championship.

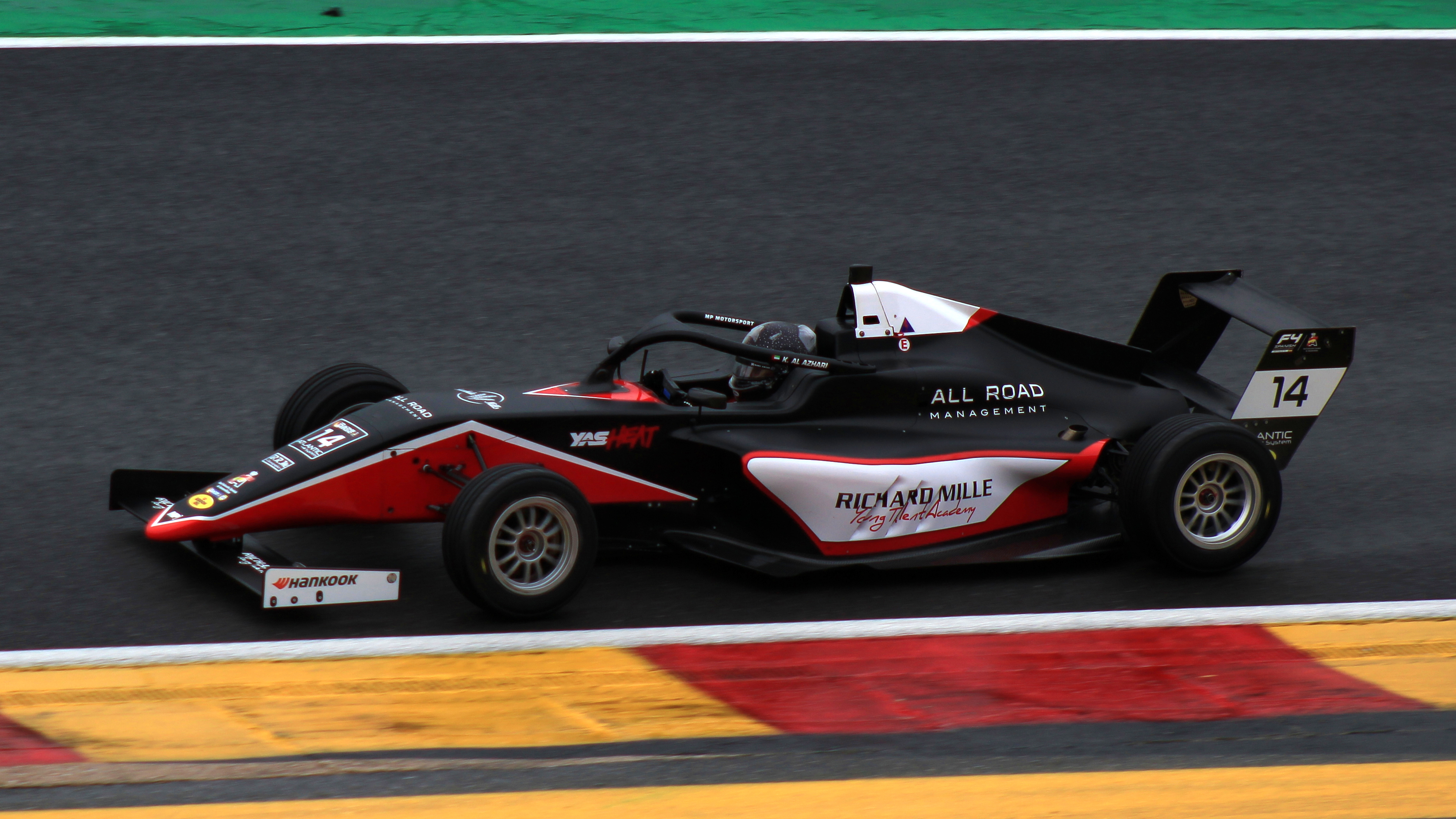
Al Azhari racing at Spa-Francorchamps during the 2023 F4 Spanish Championship

Prior to his debut, Al Azhari won the Richard Mille Young Talent Academy, which saw him won a place in Spanish F4 with MP Motorsport, for his first single-seater season. He impressed at the start with a pole and podium during the first round in Spa-Francorchamps. That would be his only podium of the year, as he scored consistently and finished ninth in the standings.

==== 2024 ====
Al Azhari returned to Formula 4 UAE for 2024 Yas Heat Racing Academy. He managed to put himself into title contention alongside Freddie Slater and Kean Nakamura-Berta with a double victory in the second Yas Marina round. He headed into the final round in Dubai Autodrome as the standings leader. However, he failed to finish on the podium that weekend, which dropped him to third in the championship. He then moved over to Europe, returning to MP Motorsport for the last two rounds of the Formula Winter Series. Al Azhari made his mark, winning once and securing two podiums as he finished seventh in the championship despite missing the first two rounds.

Al Azhari remained in the 2024 F4 Spanish Championship with MP Motorsport for his main campaign. After a double podium in Jarama, he claimed a double victory the next round in Portimão, hauling into the title fight. He extended his lead with another win at Aragón, but title rival Mattia Colnaghi took a double win in Jerez and snatched the championship from Al Azhari. Despite a double podium during the Circuit de Barcelona-Catalunya, Colnaghi won twice again and took the crown, while Al Azhari finished runner-up in the championship.

=== Formula Regional (2025–2026) ===
==== 2025: GB3 ====
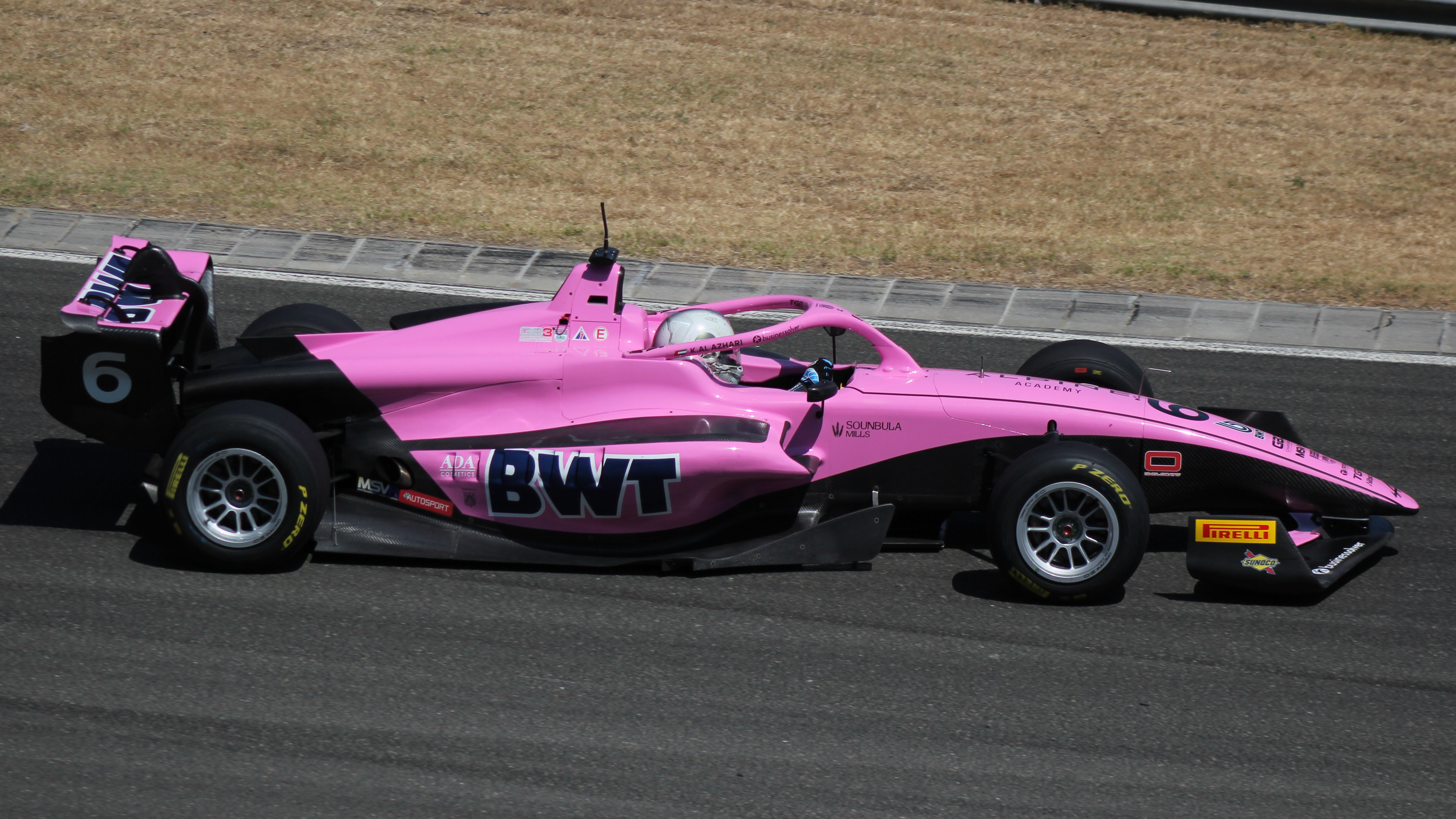
Al Azhari driving at the Hungaroring during the 2025 GB3 Championship

Al Azhari moved to GB3 for 2025, signing with Hitech TGR.

==== 2026: Eurocup-3 ====
Al Azhari continued with Hitech, but switched to Eurocup-3 for 2026.

=== Formula Three (2027) ===
Al Azhari is set to remain with Hitech and progress to FIA Formula 3 in 2027.

=== Prototype racing ===
During his time in the UAE in 2024, Al Azhari made his endurance racing debut, competing in the Dubai 24 Hour. He finished 36th driving for Mühlner Motorsport alongside teammates Vlad Lomko, Bryan Sircely and Gilles Vannelet. He later competed in Prototype Cup Germany with the same team later this season, driving Mühlner's LMP3 Duqueine M30 - D08.

=== Formula One ===
In March 2025, it was announced that Al Azhari joined the Alpine Academy.

== Personal life ==
Al Azhari is the son of Karim Al Azhari, a German-Emirati businessman and multiple UAE karting champion. Al Azhari is also the older brother of Adam Al Azhari, who he raced against in Spanish F4.

== Karting record ==
=== Karting career summary ===
Season	Series	Team (s)	Position
2017	Rotax Max Challenge Grand Finals - Micro Max	Al Ain Raceway	11th
2017-18	IAME Series UAE - X30 Cadet		9th
2018	WSK Champions Cup - 60 Mini	Team Driver Racing Kart	21st
2018	WSK Super Master Series - 60 Mini	Team Driver Racing Kart	23rd
2018	South Garda Winter Cup - Mini Rok	Team Driver Racing Kart	34th
2018	WSK Open Cup - 60 Mini	Team Driver Racing Kart	NC
2018	IAME International Final - X30 Mini	KR Sport	9th
2018	WSK Final Cup - 60 Mini	Parolin Racing Kart	20th
2018-19	IAME Series UAE - X30 Junior		12th
2019	WSK Champions Cup - 60 Mini	Parolin Racing Kart	16th
2019	WSK Super Master Series - 60 Mini	Parolin Racing Kart	17th
2019	WSK Euro Series - 60 Mini	Parolin Racing Kart	14th
2019	WSK Final Cup - 60 Mini	Parolin Racing Kart	NC
2019-20	IAME Series UAE - X30 Junior		2nd
2020	South Garda Winter Cup - OKJ	Birel ART Racing	79th
2020	WSK Super Master Series - OKJ	Birel ART Racing	106th
2020	WSK Euro Series - OKJ	Birel ART Racing	39th
2020	Champions of the Future - OKJ	Birel ART Racing	NC
2020	CIK-FIA European Championship - OKJ	DPK Racing	86th
2020	CIK-FIA World Championship - OKJ	DPK Racing	30th
2020	WSK Open Cup - OKJ	DPK Racing	31st
2020	Academy Trophy - Academy	Al Azhari Karim	15th
2020-21	IAME Series UAE - X30 Junior		1st
2021	WSK Super Master Series - OKJ	DPK Racing	35th
2021	Champions of the Future - OKJ	DPK Racing	9th
2021	CIK-FIA European Championship - OKJ	DPK Racing	24th
2021	WSK Euro Series - OKJ	DPK Racing	115th
2021	WSK Open Cup - OKJ	Tony Kart Racing Team	18th
2021	CIK-FIA World Championship - OKJ	Tony Kart Racing Team	29th
2021-22	IAME Series UAE - Gearbox		6th
2022	South Garda Winter Cup - OK	Tony Kart Racing Team	10th
2022	Champions of the Future - OK	Tony Kart Racing Team	35th
2022	CIK-FIA European Championship - OK	Tony Kart Racing Team	45th
2022	CIK-FIA World Championship - OK	Tony Kart Racing Team	43rd

== Racing record ==
=== Racing career summary ===
Season	Series	Team	Races	Wins	Poles	F/Laps	Podiums	Points	Position
2023	Formula 4 UAE Championship	Yas Heat Racing Academy	15	0	0	0	2	63	7th
2023	F4 Spanish Championship	MP Motorsport	21	0	1	0	1	100	9th
2023	Formula 4 UAE Championship - Trophy Round	Yas Heat Racing Academy	2	2	2	1	2	N/A	NC
2023–24	Middle East Trophy - 992	Mühlner Motorsport	1	0	0	0	0	N/A	NC
2024	Formula 4 UAE Championship	Yas Heat Racing Academy	15	2	3	6	7	164	**3rd**
2024	Formula Winter Series	MP Motorsport	5	1	2	1	2	58	7th
2024	F4 Spanish Championship	MP Motorsport	21	4	5	3	13	272	**2nd**
2024	Prototype Cup Germany	Mühlner Motorsport	12	2	5	4	6	191	4th
2025	GT Winter Series - GT3	SSR Performance	2	2	2	2	2	38	43rd
2025	GB3 Championship	Hitech TGR	24	1	1	0	5	310	6th
2025	Prototype Cup Germany	Mühlner Motorsport	4	0	1	0	0	8	14th
2026	Eurocup-3 Spanish Winter Championship	Hitech	9	2	3	3	7	144	**1st**
2026	Eurocup-3	Hitech	19	4	4	5	8	225	**2nd**
2027	FIA Formula 3 Championship	Hitech	0	0	0	0	0	0	TBD

* Season still in progress.

=== Complete Formula 4 UAE Championship results ===
(key) (Races in bold indicate pole position) (Races in italics indicate fastest lap)

Year	Team	1	2	3	4	5	6	7	8	9	10	11	12	13	14	15	DC	Points
2023	Yas Heat Racing Academy	DUB1; 1; 11	DUB1; 2; 23	DUB1; 3; 29	KMT1; 1; 12	KMT1; 2; 8	KMT1; 3; 10	KMT2; 1; 6	KMT2; 2; 8	KMT2; 3; 14	DUB2; 1 Ret	DUB2; 2; 22	DUB2; 3; 2	YMC; 1; 10	YMC; 2; 4	YMC; 3; 3	7th	63
2024	Yas Heat Racing Academy	**YMC1**; **1**; 2	YMC1; 2; 30†	**YMC1**; **3**; 2	YMC2; 1; 10	YMC2; 2; 1	**YMC2**; **3**; 1	DUB1; 1; 5	DUB1; 2; 2	DUB1; 3; 2	YMC3; 1 Ret	YMC3; 2; 12	YMC3; 3; 3	DUB2; 1; 9	DUB2; 2; 5	DUB2; 3; 8	3rd	164

=== Complete F4 Spanish Championship results ===
(key) (Races in bold indicate pole position) (Races in italics indicate fastest lap)

Year	Team	1	2	3	4	5	6	7	8	9	10	11	12	13	14	15	16	17	18	19	20	21	DC	Points
2023	MP Motorsport	SPA; 1; 3	**SPA**; **2** Ret	SPA; 3; 4	ARA; 1; 30	ARA; 2; 8	ARA; 3; 5	NAV; 1; 6	NAV; 2; 5	NAV; 3; 4	JER; 1; 9	JER; 2; 13	JER; 3; 5	EST; 1; 14	EST; 2; 7	EST; 3; 19	CRT; 1; 13	CRT; 2; 7	CRT; 3; 8	CAT; 1; 10	CAT; 2; 11	CAT; 3; 6	9th	100
2024	MP Motorsport	JAR; 1; 2	JAR; 2; 3	JAR; 3; 9	**ALG**; **1**; 1	**ALG**; **2**; 2	**ALG**; **3**; 1	LEC; 1; 30	LEC; 2; 2	LEC; 3; 2	ARA; 1; 3	ARA; 2; 16	**ARA**; **3**; 1	CRT; 1 Ret	CRT; 2; 31	CRT; 3; 2	JER; 1; 5	**JER**; **2**; 1	JER; 3; 4	CAT; 1; 2	CAT; 2; 18	CAT; 3; 3	2nd	272

=== Complete Formula Winter Series results ===
(key) (Races in bold indicate pole position; races in italics indicate fastest lap)

Year	Team	1	2	3	4	5	6	7	8	9	10	11	12	DC	Points
2024	MP Motorsport	JER; 1	JER; 2	JER; 3	CRT; 1	CRT; 2	CRT; 3	**ARA**; **1**; 1	**ARA**; **2**; 2	ARA; 3 Ret	CAT; 2 C	CAT; 2; 8	CAT; 3; 6	7th	58

=== Complete Prototype Cup Germany results ===
(key) (Races in bold indicate pole position) (Races in italics indicate fastest lap)

Year	Team	Car	Engine	1	2	3	4	5	6	7	8	9	10	11	12	13	14	DC	Points
2024	Mühlner Motorsport	Duqueine M30 - D08	Nissan VK56DE 5.6 L V8	SPA; 1 C	SPA; 2 C	LAU; 1; 4	LAU; 2 Ret	**LAU**; **3**; 6	**ZAN**; **1**; 5	**ZAN**; **2**; 1	HOC; 1; 2	HOC; 2; 3	HOC; 3; 7	NÜR; 1; 2	NÜR; 2; 4	**SAC**; **1**; 2	**SAC**; **2**; 1	4th	191
2025	Mühlner Motorsport	Duqueine M30 - D08	Nissan VK56DE 5.6 L V8	SPA; 1 Ret	SPA; 2 Ret	HOC; 1	HOC; 2	LAU; 1	LAU; 2	NOR; 1	NOR; 2	NÜR; 1	NÜR; 2	RBR; 1; 8	RBR; 2 Ret			14th	8

=== Complete GB3 Championship results ===
(key) (Races in bold indicate pole position) (Races in italics indicate fastest lap)

Year	Team	1	2	3	4	5	6	7	8	9	10	11	12	13	14	15	16	17	18	19	20	21	22	23	24	DC	Points
2025	Hitech	SIL1; 1; 7	SIL1; 2 Ret	SIL1; 3; 6	ZAN; 1; 8	ZAN; 2; 10	ZAN; 3; 3	SPA; 1; 15	SPA; 2; 4	SPA; 3; 12	**HUN**; **1**; 3	HUN; 2; 2	HUN; 3; 7^{4}	SIL2; 1; 3	SIL2; 2; 1	SIL2; 3 Ret	BRH; 1; 12	BRH; 2 Ret	BRH; 3; 11^{4}	DON; 1 Ret	DON; 2; 7	DON; 3; 5	MNZ; 1; 12	MNZ; 2; 4	MNZ; 3; 11^{11}	6th	310

=== Complete Eurocup-3 Spanish Winter Championship results ===
(key) (Races in bold indicate pole position) (Races in italics indicate fastest lap)

Year	Team	1	2	3	4	5	6	7	8	9	DC	Points
2026	Hitech	POR; 1; 2	POR; 2; 2	**POR**; **3**; 1	JAR; 1; 1	JAR; 2; 4	**JAR**; **3**; 5	**ARA**; **1**; 2	ARA; 2; 3	ARA; 3; 3	1st	144

=== Complete Eurocup-3 results ===
(key) (Races in bold indicate pole position; races in italics indicate fastest lap)

Year	Team	1	2	3	4	5	6	7	8	9	10	11	12	13	14	15	16	17	18	19	DC	Points
2026	Hitech	**LEC**; **1**; 7	LEC; SR; 7	LEC; 2; 1	POR; 1; 6	POR; 2; 3	IMO; 1 Ret	IMO; SR; 22†	IMO; 2; 4	MNZ; 1; 6	MNZ; 2; 8	**SIL**; **1**; 1	**SIL**; **2**; 7	JER; 1; 10	JER; SPR; 1	JER; 2; 4	HUN; 1; 2	HUN; 2; 3	CAT; 1; 2	**CAT**; **2**; 1	2nd	225

=== Complete FIA Formula 3 Championship results ===
(key) (Races in bold indicate pole position) (Races in italics indicate fastest lap)

Year	Entrant	1	2	3	4	5	6	7	8	9	10	11	12	13	14	15	16	17	18	19	20	DC	Points
2027	Hitech	BHR; SPR	BHR; FEA	JED; SPR	JED; FEA	MEL; SPR	MEL; FEA	MTL; SPR	MTL; FEA	MON; SPR	MON; FEA	SIL; SPR	SIL; FEA	RBR; SPR	RBR; FEA	MNZ; SPR	MNZ; FEA	MAD; SPR	MAD; FEA	IST; SPR	IST; FEA	TBD	TBD
