= Rafaël Pérard =

French racing driver (born 2008)

- Nationality: (France) French
- Born: 4 July 2008 (age 18) Marseille, France

Eurocup-3 career
- Debut season: 2026
- Current team: Palou Motorsport
- Car number: 33
- Starts: 19
- Wins: 0
- Podiums: 3
- Poles: 1
- Fastest laps: 0
- Best finish: 8th in 2026

Previous series
- 2026 2025: Eurocup-3 Spanish Winter; French F4

Rafaël Pérard (born 4 July 2008) is a French racing driver who last competed in Eurocup-3 for Palou Motorsport.

Pérard previously raced in French F4, finishing seventh in 2025.

== Career ==
=== French F4 ===
A protégé of Éric Hélary, Pérard took part in FEED Racing for a chance of a seat in the 2025 French F4 Championship, but was eliminated in the semi-finals.

He managed to make his single-seater debut in the French F4 Championship and got three podiums in his rookie year; one on his debut at Nogaro, another at Magny-Cours and a final podium in the last round of the season at Bugatti Circuit. He finished seventh overall in the standings.

=== Eurocup-3 ===
He signed with Palou Motorsport for both the 2026 Eurocup-3 Spanish Winter Championship and the 2026 Eurocup-3 season. In the winter series, he claimed his first Formula 3-level podium in the second round at Portimão.

In Eurocup-3, he came sixth on his debut in the opening round at Circuit Paul Ricard. He achieved his first podium in the fourth round at Imola Circuit. A round later at Monza Circuit, he got his maiden pole position and converted it to a second podium.

== Personal life ==
Pérard is apart of Vitesse Sports Management. He left Marseille when he was seven, spent four years in Luxembourg and now resides in Monaco. Whilst in Marseille, he was a child model.

== Karting record ==
=== Karting career summary ===
Season	Series	Team	Position
2021	National Karting Series – Nationale	T3M Sport	45th
2022	National Karting Series – Nationale	T3M Sport	45th
2022	IAME Euro Series – X30 Senior	T3M Sport	180th
2022	IAME Warriors Final – X30 Senior	T3M Sport	NC
2022	Trofeo delle Industrie – X30 Senior	Patrick Pérard	35th
2023	WSK Champions Cup – X30 Senior	T3M Sport	20th
2023	IAME Warriors Final – X30 Senior	T3M Sport	NC
2023	IAME Euro Series – X30 Senior	Privateer	68th
2024	IAME Series France – X30 Senior	Castellet Kart Racing	30th
2024	IAME Euro Series – X30 Senior	Castellet Kart Racing	204th
2024	French Championship – Senior	Castellet Kart Racing	36th

== Racing record ==
=== Racing career summary ===
Season	Series	Team	Races	Wins	Poles	F/Laps	Podiums	Points	Position
2025	French F4 Championship	FFSA Academy	18	0	0	0	3	95	7th
2026	Eurocup-3 Spanish Winter Championship	Palou Motorsport	9	0	0	0	1	24	10th
2026	Eurocup-3	Palou Motorsport	19	0	1	0	3	73	8th

* Season still in progress.

=== Complete French F4 Championship results ===
(key) (Races in bold indicate pole position; races in italics indicate fastest lap)

Year	1	2	3	4	5	6	7	8	9	10	11	12	13	14	15	16	17	18	DC	Points
2025	NOG; 1; 2	NOG; 2; 5	NOG; 3 Ret	DIJ; 1; 4	DIJ; 2; 10	DIJ; 3; 4	SPA; 1 Ret	SPA; 2; 24	SPA; 3 Ret	MAG; 1; 2	MAG; 2; 9	MAG; 3 Ret	LÉD; 1; 7	LÉD; 2; 4	LÉD; 3; 24	LMS; 1; 3	LMS; 2 Ret	LMS; 3; 13	7th	95

=== Complete Eurocup-3 Spanish Winter Championship results ===
(key) (Races in bold indicate pole position) (Races in italics indicate fastest lap)

Year	Team	1	2	3	4	5	6	7	8	9	DC	Points
2026	Palou Motorsport	POR; 1 Ret	POR; SPR; 23	POR; 2; 8	JAR; 1 Ret	JAR; SPR; 18	JAR; 2; 2	ARA; 1; 18	ARA; SPR; 9	ARA; 2 Ret	10th	24

=== Complete Eurocup-3 results ===
(key) (Races in bold indicate pole position; races in italics indicate fastest lap)

Year	Team	1	2	3	4	5	6	7	8	9	10	11	12	13	14	15	16	17	18	19	DC	Points
2026	Palou Motorsport	LEC; 1; 6	LEC; SR; 21	LEC; 2; 13	POR; 1; 4	POR; 2 Ret	IMO; 1; 24†	IMO; SR; Ret	IMO; 2; 2	**MNZ**; **1**; 2	MNZ; 2 Ret	SIL; 1; 13	SIL; 2; 12	JER; 1; 7	JER; SR; 3	JER; 2; 25	HUN; 1; 25	HUN; 2; 12	CAT; 1; 10	CAT; 2; 11	8th	73
