= 2027 FIA Formula 3 Championship =

Motor racing championship

Campos Racing will enter the season as two-time defending Teams' Champions.

The 2027 FIA Formula 3 Championship is a planned motor racing championship for Formula 3 cars sanctioned by the Fédération Internationale de l'Automobile (FIA). The championship will be the eighteenth season of Formula 3 racing since the inception of the GP3 series and the ninth season run under the FIA Formula 3 Championship moniker. FIA Formula 3 is an open-wheel racing category serving as the third tier of formula racing in the FIA Global Pathway. The category will be run in support of selected rounds of the 2027 Formula One World Championship. As the championship is a spec series, all teams and drivers competing in the championship will run the same car, the Dallara F3 2025.

Campos Racing will enter the season as the reigning Teams' Champions, having secured their title at the first feature race at the final round of the 2026 season at the Madring.

It will be the final season scheduled to use the Dallara F3 2025 which debuted in the 2025 season.

== Entries ==
As the championship is a spec series, all teams will compete with an identical Dallara F3 2025 chassis with a 3.4 L (207 cu in) naturally-aspirated V6 engine developed by Mecachrome, and tyres supplied by Pirelli.

Entrant	No.	Driver name	Rounds
(Spain) Campos Racing	1	(Argentina) Mattia Colnaghi	TBC
(Spain) Campos Racing	2	(Colombia) Salim Hanna	TBC
(Spain) Campos Racing	3	(Mexico) Ernesto Rivera	TBC
(Italy) Trident	4	(Italy) Niccolò Maccagnani	TBC
(Italy) Trident	5	(United Kingdom) Kean Nakamura-Berta (Note: Nakamura-Berta is a Japanese-Slovak driver competing under a British licence.)	TBC
(Italy) Trident	6	(United States) Sebastian Wheldon	TBC
(Netherlands) MP Motorsport	7	(Italy) Zhenrui Chi (Note: Chi is a Chinese driver competing under an Italian licence.)	TBC
(Netherlands) MP Motorsport	8	(Italy) Matteo De Palo	TBC
(Netherlands) MP Motorsport	9	(Poland) Maciej Gładysz	TBC
(France) ART Grand Prix	10	TBA	TBC
(France) ART Grand Prix	11	TBA	TBC
(France) ART Grand Prix	12	TBA	TBC
(Netherlands) Van Amersfoort Racing	14	(United Arab Emirates) Rashid Al Dhaheri	TBC
(Netherlands) Van Amersfoort Racing	15	(Sri Lanka) Yevan David	TBC
(Netherlands) Van Amersfoort Racing	16	(France) Enzo Deligny	TBC
(New Zealand) Rodin Motorsport	17	(Brazil) Pedro Clerot	TBC
(New Zealand) Rodin Motorsport	18	(France) Alessandro Giusti	TBC
(New Zealand) Rodin Motorsport	19	(United Kingdom) Reza Seewooruthun	TBC
(Italy) Prema Racing	20	TBA	TBC
(Italy) Prema Racing	21	TBA	TBC
(Italy) Prema Racing	22	TBA	TBC
(United Kingdom) Hitech	23	(United Arab Emirates) Keanu Al Azhari	TBC
(United Kingdom) Hitech	24	(Japan) Kanato Le	TBC
(United Kingdom) Hitech	25	(South Korea) Michael Shin	TBC
(France) DAMS Lucas Oil	26	TBA	TBC
(France) DAMS Lucas Oil	27	TBA	TBC
(France) DAMS Lucas Oil	28	TBA	TBC
(Italy) LN4 Fusion	29	(United States) James Egozi	TBC
(Italy) LN4 Fusion	30	(Brazil) Gabriel Gomez	TBC
(Italy) LN4 Fusion	31	(India) Dion Gowda	TBC

=== Team changes ===
LN4 Fusion, a new team co-founded by Formula One driver Lando Norris and British karting team Fusion Motorsport, has acquired assets of AIX Racing and will join the FIA Formula 3 Championship.

=== Driver changes ===
Reigning champion Ugo Ugochukwu will step up to the team's Formula 2 outfit, while Théophile Naël left Campos. They will be replaced by Ferrari Driver Academy driver Salim Hanna, who will make his full-time debut after making two appearances for AIX Racing in 2026, and Mattia Colnaghi, who moves over from MP Motorsport for his second season after he came 13th in 2026.

Trident had an all-new lineup after 2026 runner-up Freddie Slater and Noah Strømsted both graduated to Formula 2 with Invicta Racing, and Matteo De Palo moved to MP Motorsport. The team signed two Formula Regional graduates: Formula Regional Middle East Trophy Champion and Williams Driver Academy member Kean Nakamura-Berta, as well as Formula Regional European Championship runner-up and Andretti Global Driver Development driver Sebastian Wheldon, will both step up to FIA F3. Ferrari Driver Academy and Italian F4 driver Niccolò Maccagnani will make his full-season FIA Formula 3 debut after a one-off appearance for Rodin Motorsport in 2026.

MP Motorsport also renewed their lineup as Tuukka Taponen graduated to F2 with ART Grand Prix, Alessandro Giusti moved to Rodin Motorsport and Mattia Colnaghi moved to Campos Racing. The team hired Maciej Gładysz and Matteo De Palo, who moved over from ART Grand Prix and Trident for their second season after they came 12th and 24th, respectively, in 2026. MP completed their lineup by promoting Zhenrui Chi from their FREC outfit after he finished eighth in 2026.

ART Grand Prix saw Kanato Le move to Hitech and Maciej Gładysz move to MP Motorsport.

Van Amersfoort Racing saw Hiyu Yamakoshi and Bruno del Pino leave the team. They were replaced by second-year driver Yevan David, who moves over from the departing AIX Racing team for his second season after he came 18th in 2026, and FRMET runner-up and Mercedes Junior Team driver Rashid Al Dhaheri, becoming the first Emirati driver to compete in FIA Formula 3, alongside Keanu Al Azhari.

Rodin Motorsport promoted Brando Badoer to their F2 outfit, and in turn elevated Reza Seewooruthun from their Formula Regional European and Formula Regional Middle East outfits after he finished 16th in the former and 22nd in the latter. With Christian Ho having already departed the team ahead of the 2026 season finale to focus on his enlistment for the mandatory National Service in Singapore, the team replaced him with Williams Driver Academy member Alessandro Giusti, who joined Rodin for his third season after he came 15th in 2026.

Prema Racing driver James Wharton stepped up to Formula 2 with Trident.

Hitech signed a rookie and a sophomore driver after Fionn McLaughlin and Jin Nakamura departed the team: Eurocup-3 Winter series Champion and Alpine Academy driver Keanu Al Azhari will join the team on his FIA F3 debut, becoming the first Emirati driver to compete in FIA Formula 3, alongside Rashid Al Dhaheri, while Kanato Le moves over from ART Grand Prix for his second season after he came 20th in 2026.

DAMS Lucas Oil saw Nicola Lacorte step up to Formula 2, where he joined Prema Racing.

New team LN4 Fusion signed reigning Eurocup-3 Champion James Egozi, as well as FREC graduates Gabriel Gomez and Dion Gowda, who came 14th and 20th in 2026 driving for Rodin Motorsport and Van Amersfoort Racing, respectively.

== Calendar ==
Round	Circuit	Sprint race	Feature race
1	Bahrain International Circuit, Sakhir	13 March	14 March
2	(Saudi Arabia) Jeddah Corniche Circuit, Jeddah	20 March	21 March
3	(Australia) Albert Park Circuit, Melbourne	3 April	4 April
4	(Canada) Circuit Gilles Villeneuve, Montreal (Note: Subject to contract.)	22 May	23 May
5	Circuit de Monaco, Monaco	5 June	6 June
6	(United Kingdom) Silverstone Circuit, Silverstone	3 July	4 July
7	(Austria) Red Bull Ring, Spielberg	10 July	11 July
8	(Italy) Monza Circuit, Monza	4 September	5 September
9	(Spain) Madring, Madrid	11 September	12 September
10	(Turkey) Istanbul Park, Istanbul (Note: Subject to FIA circuit homologation.)	2 October	3 October

=== Calendar changes ===
- The Bahrain Grand Prix at the Bahrain International Circuit will return to the calendar after the 2026 round was cancelled due to the Iran war.
- Formula 3 will make its debut in Saudi Arabia, Canada, and Turkey, supporting the Saudi Arabian, Canadian, and Turkish Grand Prix at the Jeddah Corniche Circuit, Circuit Gilles Villeneuve, and Istanbul Park, respectively. This marks the championship's first visit to North America. (Note: A visit to the Circuit of the Americas in the United States had been scheduled for 2021 but was cancelled due to the COVID-19 pandemic, and was replaced by an earlier round at the Sochi Autodrom.) FIA Formula 3 CEO Bruno Michel states that "like for F2, we will be covering freight costs so that the territorial expansion of the calendar does not financially impact our teams."
- The rounds at the Circuit de Spa-Francorchamps and the Hungaroring, supporting the Belgian and Hungarian Grand Prix, respectively, were removed from the calendar. Formula 3 will also not race at Circuit de Barcelona-Catalunya as the corresponding Grand Prix will not be held in 2027.

== Regulation changes ==
=== Technical regulations ===
Formula 3 will introduce 100% sustainable fuels, supplied by Aramco following incremental increases in sustainability since 2023.

== Results and standings ==
=== Scoring system ===
Points will be awarded to the top ten classified finishers in both races. (Note: Provided at least two laps are completed "without a Safety Car and/or VSC intervention.") (Note: In the event of a race ending prematurely, the number of points-paying positions may be reduced, depending on how much of the race has been completed.) The pole-sitter in the feature race will also receive two points, and one point will be given to the driver who sets the fastest lap in both the feature and sprint races, provided that driver finishes inside the top ten. If the driver who sets the fastest lap is classified outside the top ten, the point will be given to the driver who sets the fastest lap of those inside the top ten. No extra points will be awarded to the pole-sitter in the sprint race as the grid for it will be set by reversing the top twelve qualifiers.

Sprint race points

Points will be awarded to the top ten classified finishers. A bonus point will be awarded to the driver who set the fastest lap and finishes in the top ten.

Position	1st	2nd	3rd	4th	5th	6th	7th	8th	9th	10th	FL
Points	10	9	8	7	6	5	4	3	2	1	1

Feature race points

Points will be awarded to the top ten classified finishers. Bonus points will be awarded to the pole-sitter and to the driver who sets the fastest lap and finishes in the top ten.

Position	1st	2nd	3rd	4th	5th	6th	7th	8th	9th	10th	Pole	FL
Points	25	18	15	12	10	8	6	4	2	1	2	1
