= James Egozi =

American racing driver (born 2007)

- Egozi in 2026
- Nationality: (United States) American
- Born: Luis James Egozi; 10 December 2007 (age 18) Florida, United States

Eurocup-3 career
- Current team: Palou Motorsport
- Car number: 48
- Starts: 35
- Wins: 10 (2026 season)
- Podiums: 16
- Poles: 6
- Fastest laps: 13
- Best finish: 1st in 2026

Previous series
- 2026; 2025–2026; 2025; 2024; 2024; 2023; 2023: Eurocup-3; Eurocup-3 Winter; FR European; F4 Spanish; Formula Winter Series; Italian F4; F4 CEZ
- Statistics up to date as of 17 November 2026.

Luis James Egozi (born 10 December 2007) is an American racing driver who is set to compete in FIA Formula 3 with LN4 Fusion in 2027.

Egozi is the 2026 Eurocup-3 series' champion with Palou Motorsport. He is a former member of the Red Bull Junior Team.

== Career ==
=== Karting (2015–2023) ===
Egozi started karting in his home country, and his first title came at the Florida Winter Tour in the Rotax Micro Max category in 2017. He gathered many more titles in the USA after that and in 2019 earned a move to the European stage. his first major championship title in Europe came in 2021, as he won the WSK Open Cup in the OKJ Category. This was followed by consistent results in 2022 which earned him a place in Formula 4. Egozi's most recent title was won in 2023 just prior to his first race in single-seaters, winning the WSK Super Master Series driving in the OK category.

=== Formula 4 (2023–2024) ===
==== 2023 ====
After his notable karting career, Egozi made his single-seater debut in the 2023 Italian F4 Championship for PHM Racing. His campaign started off well, with consistent points finishes in the first rounds, but he would fail to score points for most rounds but did manage to score in some. Egozi finished 14th in the championship with 37 points. He also made a cameo in the 2023 Formula 4 CEZ Championship with PHM Racing where he got two wins and one pole position, finishing eighth in the championship.

==== 2024 ====
Egozi kicked off his 2024 season in the 2024 Formula Winter Series for Campos Racing. He finished ninth in the standings after winning one race and only contesting the first and third rounds. Egozi then moved on to his main season, in the 2024 F4 Spanish Championship. He would go on to have an unremarkable season under the wing of the Red Bull Junior Team, finishing on the podium three times and failing to secure a victory over the 21 races. In spite of this form, Egozi's consistency allowed him to secure 6th place in the championship with 143 points.

=== Formula Regional (2025–) ===
==== 2025: Eurocup-3 debut ====
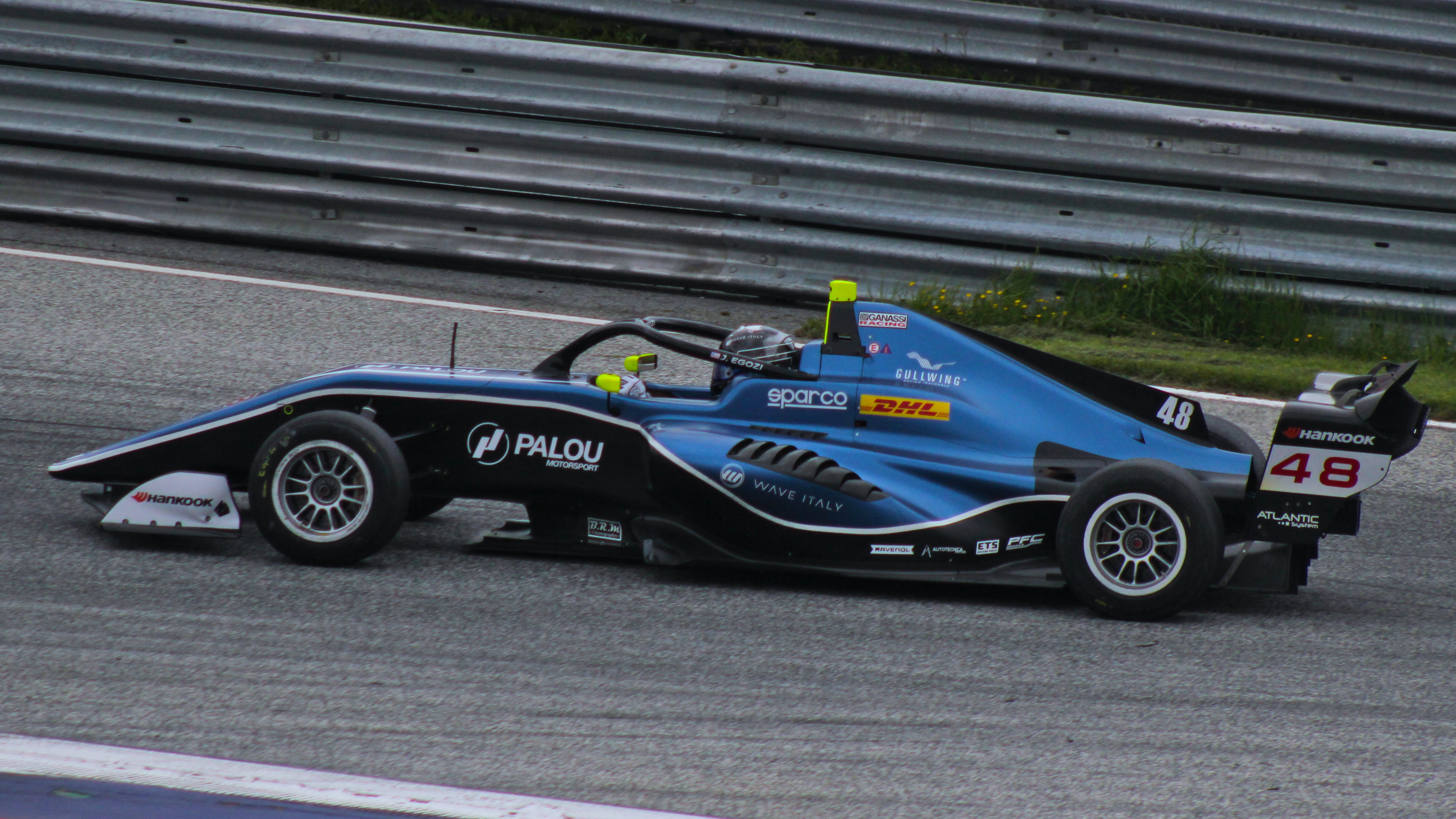
Egozi driving for Palou Motorsport at the Red Bull Ring in Eurocup-3 in 2025.

In early 2025, Egozi was confirmed to be competing in the 2025 Eurocup-3 season, joining Palou Motorsport. He would also join the team for the Spanish Winter Championship, and he secured a second-placed finish in the opening race at the Circuito de Jerez. He then won the second race in Portimao. Egozi scored a further podium in the first race in Aragón.

In October, Egozi joined RPM for the penultimate round of the 2025 Formula Regional European Championship in Hockenheim.

==== 2026 ====
Egozi remained with Palou Motorsport for the 2026 Eurocup-3 season. At the end of the year, Egozi joined SJM Theodore Racing for the Macau Grand Prix.

=== FIA Formula 3 (2027–) ===
In October 2026, it was announced that Egozi will compete in the 2027 FIA Formula 3 Championship with LN4 Fusion.

=== Formula One ===
In February 2024, it was announced that Egozi would become a Red Bull Junior. He left the team at the end of the year.

== Karting record ==
=== Karting career summary ===
| Season | Series | Team | Position |
|---|---|---|---|
| 2015 | Florida Winter Tour — Rotax Micro Max | | 4th |
| 2015 | SKUSA Pro Tour — TaG Cadet | | 30th |
| 2015 | SKUSA SuperNationals — TaG Cadet | Team Benik Kart | 51st |
| 2016 | Florida Winter Tour — Rotax Micro Max | | 3rd |
| 2016 | Florida Winter Tour — Mini ROK | | 7th |
| 2016 | SKUSA Pro Tour — Mini Swift | | 22nd |
| 2016 | SKUSA SuperNationals — Mini Swift | Team Keone USA | 30th |
| 2016 | Rotax Max Challenge U.S.A. — Micro Max | | 2nd |
| 2016 | Rotax Max Challenge Grand Finals — Micro Max | Maxspeed Group | 4th |
| 2017 | Florida Winter Tour — Rotax Micro Max | | 1st |
| 2017 | Florida Winter Tour — Mini ROK | | 4th |
| 2017 | SKUSA Pro Tour — Mini Swift | | 31st |
| 2017 | US Pro Kart Series — Mini Swift | | 1st |
| 2017 | SKUSA SuperNationals — Mini Swift | Team Keone USA | 13th |
| 2018 | Florida Winter Tour — Mini ROK | | 1st |
| 2018 | SKUSA Winter Series — Mini Swift | | 3rd |
| 2018 | SKUSA Pro Tour — Mini Swift | | 9th |
| 2018 | ROK the Rio — Mini ROK | Keone USA | 1st |
| 2018 | SKUSA SuperNationals — Mini Swift | Keone USA | 13th |
| 2018 | ROK Cup International Final — Mini ROK | Keone USA | 19th |
| 2018 | Rotax Max Challenge U.S.A. — Mini Max | Keone USA | 1st |
| 2018 | Rotax Max Challenge Grand Finals — Mini Max | J3 Competition | 34th |
| 2019 | WSK Super Master Series — 60 Mini | Tony Kart Racing Team | 36th |
| 2019 | WSK Euro Series — 60 Mini | Tony Kart Racing Team | 20th |
| 2019 | WSK Open Cup — 60 Mini | Tony Kart Racing Team | 26th |
| 2019 | WSK Final Cup — 60 Mini | Tony Kart Racing Team | 27th |
| 2020 | WSK Super Master Series — 60 Mini | Tony Kart Racing Team | 10th |
| 2020 | WSK Euro Series — 60 Mini | Tony Kart Racing Team | 9th |
| 2020 | WSK Open Cup — OKJ | Tony Kart Racing Team | 13th |
| 2021 | WSK Champions Cup — OKJ | Tony Kart Racing Team | 10th |
| 2021 | South Garda Winter Cup — OKJ | Tony Kart Racing Team | 8th |
| 2021 | WSK Super Master Series — OKJ | Tony Kart Racing Team | 12th |
| 2021 | WSK Euro Series — OKJ | Tony Kart Racing Team | 4th |
| 2021 | CIK-FIA European Championship — OKJ | Tony Kart Racing Team | 5th |
| 2021 | WSK Open Cup — OKJ | Tony Kart Racing Team | 1st |
| 2021 | Champions of the Future — OKJ | Tony Kart Racing Team | 5th |
| 2022 | WSK Super Master Series — OK | Tony Kart Racing Team | 9th |
| 2022 | WSK Euro Series — OK | Tony Kart Racing Team | 29th |
| 2022 | Champions of the Future Winter Series — OK | Tony Kart Racing Team | 26th |
| 2022 | Champions of the Future — OK | Tony Kart Racing Team | 21st |
| 2022 | CIK-FIA European Championship — OK | Tony Kart Racing Team | 19th |
| 2022 | CIK-FIA World Championship — OK | Tony Kart Racing Team | 11th |
| 2022 | WSK Open Cup — OK | Tony Kart Racing Team | 5th |
| 2022 | WSK Final Cup — OK | Tony Kart Racing Team | 6th |
| 2023 | WSK Super Master Series — OK | Tony Kart Racing Team | 1st |
| 2023 | CIK-FIA European Championship — OK | Tony Kart Racing Team | 31st |
| 2023 | CIK-FIA World Championship — OK | Tony Kart Racing Team | 11th |

== Racing record ==
=== Racing career summary ===
| Season | Series | Team | Races | Wins | Poles | F/Laps | Podiums | Points | Position |
|---|---|---|---|---|---|---|---|---|---|
| 2023 | Italian F4 Championship | PHM Racing | 21 | 0 | 0 | 0 | 0 | 37 | 14th |
| 2023 | Formula 4 CEZ Championship | PHM Racing | 2 | 2 | 1 | 2 | 2 | 50 | 8th |
| 2024 | Formula Winter Series | Campos Racing | 6 | 1 | 1 | 1 | 1 | 54 | 9th |
| 2024 | F4 Spanish Championship | Campos Racing | 21 | 0 | 1 | 0 | 3 | 143 | 6th |
| 2025 | Eurocup-3 Spanish Winter Championship | Palou Motorsport | 8 | 2 | 1 | 1 | 3 | 86 | **3rd** |
| 2025 | Eurocup-3 | Palou Motorsport | 16 | 1 | 0 | 1 | 1 | 97 | 9th |
| 2025 | Formula Regional European Championship | RPM | 2 | 0 | 0 | 0 | 0 | 0 | NC† |
| 2025 | Formula Regional European Championship | Saintéloc Racing | 2 | 0 | 0 | 0 | 0 | 0 | NC† |
| 2025 | Macau Grand Prix | Saintéloc Racing | 1 | 0 | 0 | 0 | 0 | —N/a | 14th |
| 2026 | Eurocup-3 Spanish Winter Championship | Palou Motorsport | 8 | 4 | 0 | 1 | 4 | 92 | **2nd** |
| 2026 | Eurocup-3 | Palou Motorsport | 19 | 9 | 6 | 12 | 15 | 355 | **1st** |
| 2026 | Macau Grand Prix | SJM Theodore Racing | | | | | | —N/a | |
| 2027 | FIA Formula 3 Championship | LN4 Fusion | 0 | 0 | 0 | 0 | 0 | 0 | TBD |

* Season still in progress.

† As Egozi was a guest driver, he was ineligible for points.

=== Complete Italian F4 Championship results ===
(key) (Races in bold indicate pole position) (Races in italics indicate fastest lap)

| Year | Team | 1 | 2 | 3 | 4 | 5 | 6 | 7 | 8 | 9 | 10 | 11 | 12 | 13 | 14 | 15 | 16 | 17 | 18 | 19 | 20 | 21 | 22 | DC | Points |
|---|---|---|---|---|---|---|---|---|---|---|---|---|---|---|---|---|---|---|---|---|---|---|---|---|---|
| 2023 | PHM Racing | IMO; 1; 8 | IMO; 2 | IMO; 3; 9 | IMO; 4; 11 | MIS; 1; 12 | MIS; 2; 12 | MIS; 3; 11 | SPA; 1; 14 | SPA; 2; 12 | SPA; 3; 9 | MNZ; 1; 8 | MNZ; 2 Ret | MNZ; 3; 20 | LEC; 1; 5 | LEC; 2; 7 | LEC; 3 Ret | MUG; 1; 12 | MUG; 2; 17 | MUG; 3; 11 | VLL; 1; 10 | VLL; 2; 7 | VLL; 3; 9 | 14th | 37 |

=== Complete Formula 4 CEZ Championship results ===
(key) (Races in bold indicate pole position; races in italics indicate fastest lap)

| Year | Team | 1 | 2 | 3 | 4 | 5 | 6 | 7 | 8 | 9 | 10 | 11 | 12 | 13 | 14 | DC | Points |
|---|---|---|---|---|---|---|---|---|---|---|---|---|---|---|---|---|---|
| 2023 | PHM Racing | HUN; 1 | HUN; 2 | **RBR**; **1**; 1 | RBR; 2; 1 | SVK; 1 | SVK; 2 | MOS; 1 | MOS; 2 | MOS; 3 | BRN; 1 | BRN; 2 | BAL; 1 | BAL; 2 | BAL; 3 | 8th | 50 |

=== Complete Formula Winter Series results ===
(key) (Races in bold indicate pole position; races in italics indicate fastest lap)

| Year | Team | 1 | 2 | 3 | 4 | 5 | 6 | 7 | 8 | 9 | 10 | 11 | 12 | DC | Points |
|---|---|---|---|---|---|---|---|---|---|---|---|---|---|---|---|
| 2024 | Campos Racing | JER; 1; 15 | JER; 2; 4 | JER; 3; 8 | CRT; 1 | CRT; 2 | CRT; 3 | ARA; 1; 5 | ARA; 2 Ret | **ARA**; **3**; 1 | CAT; 1 | CAT; 2 | CAT; 3 | 9th | 54 |

=== Complete F4 Spanish Championship results ===
(key) (Races in bold indicate pole position; races in italics indicate fastest lap)

| Year | Team | 1 | 2 | 3 | 4 | 5 | 6 | 7 | 8 | 9 | 10 | 11 | 12 | 13 | 14 | 15 | 16 | 17 | 18 | 19 | 20 | 21 | DC | Points |
|---|---|---|---|---|---|---|---|---|---|---|---|---|---|---|---|---|---|---|---|---|---|---|---|---|
| 2024 | Campos Racing | JAR; 1 Ret | JAR; 2; 4 | JAR; 3 Ret | POR; 1; 4 | POR; 2; 5 | POR; 3; 18 | LEC; 1; 2 | LEC; 2; 5 | LEC; 3; 3 | ARA; 1; 4 | ARA; 2; 11 | ARA; 3; 14 | CRT; 1; 11 | CRT; 2; 10 | CRT; 3; 6 | JER; 1; 6 | JER; 2; 5 | JER; 3; 6 | CAT; 1; 9 | CAT; 2; 5 | **CAT**; **3**; 2 | 6th | 143 |

=== Complete Eurocup-3 Spanish Winter Championship results ===
(key) (Races in bold indicate pole position) (Races in italics indicate fastest lap)

| Year | Team | 1 | 2 | 3 | 4 | 5 | 6 | 7 | 8 | 9 | DC | Points |
|---|---|---|---|---|---|---|---|---|---|---|---|---|
| 2025 | Palou Motorsport | JER; 1; 2 | JER; 2; 6 | JER; 3; 9 | POR; 1; 12 | POR; 2; 1 | POR; 3; 4 | ARA; 1; 10 | **ARA**; **2**; 1 | | 3rd | 86 |
| 2026 | Palou Motorsport | POR; 1; 1 | POR; 2; 1 | POR; 3; 13 | JAR; 1; 7 | JAR; 2 Ret | JAR; 3; 1 | ARA; 1; 1 | ARA; 2 Ret | ARA; 3 DNS | 2nd | 92 |

=== Complete Eurocup-3 results ===
(key) (Races in bold indicate pole position) (Races in italics indicate fastest lap)

| Year | Team | 1 | 2 | 3 | 4 | 5 | 6 | 7 | 8 | 9 | 10 | 11 | 12 | 13 | 14 | 15 | 16 | 17 | 18 | 19 | DC | Points |
|---|---|---|---|---|---|---|---|---|---|---|---|---|---|---|---|---|---|---|---|---|---|---|
| 2025 | Palou Motorsport | RBR; 1; 5 | RBR; 2; 10 | POR; 1; 6 | POR; SR; 1 | POR; 2; 8 | LEC; 1; 16 | LEC; SR; 4 | LEC; 2; 7 | MNZ; 1; 8 | MNZ; 2; 4 | ASS; 1; 7 | ASS; 2; 7 | SPA; 1; 7 | SPA; 2; 4 | JER; 1; 9 | JER; 2; 9 | CAT; 1 | CAT; 2 | | 9th | 97 |
| 2026 | Palou Motorsport | LEC; 1; 1 | LEC; SR; 3 | LEC; 2; 2 | POR; 1; 1 | **POR**; **2**; 1 | **IMO**; **1** Ret | IMO; SR; 6 | **IMO**; **2**; 1 | MNZ; 1; 1 | MNZ; 2; 1 | SIL; 1; 3 | SIL; 2; 1 | **JER**; **1**; 1 | JER; SR; 10 | JER; 2; 2 | HUN; 1; 4 | **HUN**; **2**; 1 | **CAT**; **1**; 3 | CAT; 2; 3 | 1st | 355 |

=== Complete Formula Regional European Championship results ===
(key) (Races in bold indicate pole position) (Races in italics indicate fastest lap)

| Year | Team | 1 | 2 | 3 | 4 | 5 | 6 | 7 | 8 | 9 | 10 | 11 | 12 | 13 | 14 | 15 | 16 | 17 | 18 | 19 | 20 | DC | Points |
|---|---|---|---|---|---|---|---|---|---|---|---|---|---|---|---|---|---|---|---|---|---|---|---|
| 2025 | RPM | MIS; 1 | MIS; 2 | SPA; 1 | SPA; 2 | ZAN; 1 | ZAN; 2 | HUN; 1 | HUN; 2 | LEC; 1 | LEC; 2 | IMO; 1 | IMO; 2 | RBR; 1 | RBR; 2 | CAT; 1 | CAT; 2 | HOC; 1; 8 | HOC; 2; 11 | | | NC† | 0 |
| 2025 | Saintéloc Racing | | | | | | | | | | | | | | | | | | | MNZ; 1 Ret | MNZ; 2; 11 | NC† | 0 |

† As Egozi was a guest driver, he was ineligible for points.

=== Complete Macau Grand Prix results ===
| Year | Team | Car | Qualifying | Quali Race | Main Race |
|---|---|---|---|---|---|
| 2025 | (France) Saintéloc Racing | Tatuus F3 T-318 | 11th | 8th | 14th |
| 2026 | (Macau) SJM Theodore Racing | Tatuus T-326 | TBD | TBD | TBD |

=== Complete FIA Formula 3 Championship results ===
(key) (Races in bold indicate pole position) (Races in italics indicate fastest lap)

| Year | Entrant | 1 | 2 | 3 | 4 | 5 | 6 | 7 | 8 | 9 | 10 | 11 | 12 | 13 | 14 | 15 | 16 | 17 | 18 | 19 | 20 | DC | Points |
|---|---|---|---|---|---|---|---|---|---|---|---|---|---|---|---|---|---|---|---|---|---|---|---|
| 2027 | LN4 Fusion | BHR; SPR | BHR; FEA | JED; SPR | JED; FEA | MEL; SPR | MEL; FEA | MTL; SPR | MTL; FEA | MON; SPR | MON; FEA | SIL; SPR | SIL; FEA | RBR; SPR | RBR; FEA | MNZ; SPR | MNZ; FEA | MAD; SPR | MAD; FEA | IST; SPR | IST; FEA | TBD | TBD |
