= 2026 Eurocup-3 season =

Season of motorsport championship

James Egozi won the Drivers' Championship with four races to spare, while his team, Palou Motorsport, won their maiden Teams' Championship.

The 2026 Eurocup-3 season was the fourth season of the Eurocup-3 series. Eurocup-3 was a multi-event motor racing championship for single-seater open wheel formula racing cars held across Europe, created in 2023 as an alternative to the FIA-sanctioned Formula Regional European Championship and the Euroformula Open Championship.

2026 also saw the second edition of the Eurocup-3 Spanish Winter Championship, held across the Iberian Peninsula in February and March.

Palou Motorsport driver James Egozi dominated the championship, winning nine races and clinching the Drivers' Championship title with two race weekends to spare. His teammate Heitor Dall'Agnol came third overall to secure the Rookies' Championship title, while their team won their maiden Teams' Championship title.

== Main series ==
=== Teams and drivers ===
The 2026 season saw the championship enter its second generation of technical regulations. This saw the championship change both its chassis and engine supplier. After previously using a slightly revised Tatuus F3 T-318 chassis, 2026 saw the debut of the Dallara 326 chassis, an evolution of the Dallara 324 used by the Euroformula Open and Super Formula Lights. Like in these two series, the new engine was a 1.6 L 275 hp (205 kW) inline-3 turbocharged unit developed by TOM'S based on the Toyota G16E-GTS, with Eurocup-3 discontinuing its collaboration with Alfa Romeo and Autotecnica.

Team	No.	Driver	Status	Rounds
(Spain) Tecnicar by Amtog	2	(Poland) Kacper Sztuka		All
(Spain) Tecnicar by Amtog	20	(Costa Rica) Benjamín Beckley	**R**	All
(Spain) Tecnicar by Amtog	22	(Serbia) Andrej Petrović	**R**	1, 4
(Spain) Tecnicar by Amtog	22	(United Kingdom) Casper Stevenson		2
(Spain) Tecnicar by Amtog	22	(Spain) Nacho Tuñón		3, 5
(Spain) Tecnicar by Amtog	22	(Spain) Dani Maciá	**R**	6–8
(Spain) Drivex	3	(France) Édouard Borgna		1–3
(Spain) Drivex	3	(United Kingdom) Nathan Tye	**R**	4
(Spain) Drivex	3	(Monaco) Sam Urus	**R**	5–6
(Spain) Drivex	3	(Austria) Oscar Wurz	**G**	7
(Spain) Drivex	3	(Brazil) Bernardo Gentil	**R** **G**	8
(Spain) Drivex	6	(Greece) Stylianos Kolovos	**R**	All
(Spain) Drivex	7	(Lebanon) Christopher El Feghali	**R**	All
(Spain) Drivex	37	(Brazil) Filippo Fiorentino	**R**	All
(Netherlands) MP Motorsport	4	(Belgium) Ean Eyckmans	**R**	All
(Netherlands) MP Motorsport	8	(Brazil) Alceu Feldmann Neto		All
(Netherlands) MP Motorsport	12	(Australia) Gianmarco Pradel		All
(Netherlands) MP Motorsport	99	(Netherlands) René Lammers	**R**	All
(Spain) Griffin Core	5	(Australia) Patrick Heuzenroeder		1–5
(Spain) Griffin Core	5	(Italy) Maximilian Popov		6–8
(Spain) Griffin Core	9	(Belgium) Thomas Strauven	**R**	All
(Spain) Griffin Core	10	(Thailand) Enzo Tarnvanichkul		All
(Spain) Griffin Core	41	(United States) Alex Powell	**R**	1–4, 6
(Spain) Griffin Core	41	(Portugal) Francisco Macedo		5
(Spain) Griffin Core	41	(Singapore) Kabir Anurag	**R** **G**	7
(Spain) Griffin Core	41	(Monaco) Matteo Giaccardi	**R** **G**	8
(Spain) TC Racing	11	(Romania) Luca Viișoreanu	**R**	1–2
(Spain) TC Racing	11	(Spain) Juan Cota	**R**	3–4, 6
(Spain) TC Racing	11	(Germany) Valentin Kluss		5
(Spain) TC Racing	11	(United States) Rahim Alibhai	**R** **G**	7–8
(Spain) TC Racing	31	(Argentina) Renzo Barbuy	**R**	All
(United Kingdom) Hitech	14	(United Arab Emirates) Keanu Al Azhari		All
(United Kingdom) Hitech	23	(Bulgaria) Stefan Bostandjiev		All
(United Kingdom) Hitech	39	(Argentina) Santino Panetta	**R**	All
(United Kingdom) Hitech	84	(Argentina) Gino Trappa	**R**	All
(Spain) Palou Motorsport	16	(Philippines) Bianca Bustamante		All
(Spain) Palou Motorsport	27	(Brazil) Heitor Dall'Agnol	**R**	All
(Spain) Palou Motorsport	33	(France) Rafaël Pérard	**R**	All
(Spain) Palou Motorsport	48	(United States) James Egozi		All
(United Kingdom) Double R Racing	26	(Sweden) Linus Lundqvist		1
(United Kingdom) Double R Racing	26	(United Kingdom) Tommy Harfield	**R**	2–4
(United Kingdom) Double R Racing	26	(United Kingdom) James Hedley		5–6
(United Kingdom) Double R Racing	26	(United Kingdom) Josh McLean	**R** **G**	7–8
(United Kingdom) Double R Racing	77	(United Kingdom) Bart Harrison	**R**	1–7
(United Kingdom) Double R Racing	77	(United Kingdom) Dayton Coulthard	**R** **G**	8
(United Kingdom) Double R Racing	91	(Angola) Lorenzo Campos	**R**	All
(Spain) GRS Team	44	(France) Rayan Caretti	**R**	1–6
(Spain) GRS Team	44	(Andorra) Frank Porté Ruiz	**R** **G**	7
(Spain) GRS Team	44	(Spain) Juan Cota	**R**	8
(Spain) GRS Team	70	(United States) Andre Rodriguez	**R**	1
(Spain) GRS Team	70	(Germany) Jakob Bergmeister		2
(Spain) GRS Team	70	(Belgium) Yani Stevenheydens	**R**	3
(Spain) GRS Team	70	(Ukraine) Oleksandr Bondarev	**R**	4 (Note: Bondarev was originally entered into Round 4, but withdrew and was replaced by Maciá.)
(Spain) GRS Team	70	(Spain) Dani Maciá	**R**	4–5
(Spain) GRS Team	70	(United Kingdom) Kai Daryanani		6–8

Icon	Legend
**R**	Rookie
**G**	Guest driver

- Yuanpu Cui was originally announced to be part of Double R Racing's lineup, but did not enter any rounds.

=== Calendar ===
The provisional calendar was announced on 30 July 2025. That first draft included the new Spanish Grand Prix venue Madring, even though the circuit denied that any agreement regarding the Eurocup-3 round was achieved. An updated version of the calendar was released on 4 December 2025, where the planned Madring event was not included, with one venue still to be announced. The sixth round was later confirmed to be held at Circuito de Jerez two weeks after the round at Silverstone Circuit. For the first time ever, the series visited the United Kingdom and Hungary, with its fifth round taking place at Silverstone Circuit and its seventh round at the Hungaroring. The series also debuted at Imola Circuit, while TT Circuit Assen, Circuit de Spa-Francorchamps and the Red Bull Ring all left the schedule. Three of the rounds were held using the three-round format that added a sprint race to the weekend.

Round		Circuit	Date	Support bill	Map of circuit locations
1	R1	(France) Circuit Paul Ricard, Le Castellet	2 May	European Le Mans Series; Le Mans Cup; Ligier European Series	2026 Eurocup-3 season is located in Europe
1	SR	(France) Circuit Paul Ricard, Le Castellet	2 May	European Le Mans Series; Le Mans Cup; Ligier European Series	2026 Eurocup-3 season is located in Europe
1	R2	(France) Circuit Paul Ricard, Le Castellet	3 May	European Le Mans Series; Le Mans Cup; Ligier European Series	2026 Eurocup-3 season is located in Europe
2	R1	(Portugal) Algarve International Circuit, Portimão	6 June	F4 Spanish Championship	2026 Eurocup-3 season is located in Europe
2	R2	(Portugal) Algarve International Circuit, Portimão	7 June	F4 Spanish Championship	2026 Eurocup-3 season is located in Europe
3	R1	(Italy) Imola Circuit, Imola	4 July	European Le Mans Series; Porsche Carrera Cup Benelux	2026 Eurocup-3 season is located in Europe
3	SR	(Italy) Imola Circuit, Imola	5 July	European Le Mans Series; Porsche Carrera Cup Benelux	2026 Eurocup-3 season is located in Europe
3	R2	(Italy) Imola Circuit, Imola	5 July	European Le Mans Series; Porsche Carrera Cup Benelux	2026 Eurocup-3 season is located in Europe
4	R1	(Italy) Monza Circuit, Monza	1 August	Prototype Cup Europe	2026 Eurocup-3 season is located in Europe
4	R2	(Italy) Monza Circuit, Monza	2 August	Prototype Cup Europe	2026 Eurocup-3 season is located in Europe
5	R1	(United Kingdom) Silverstone Circuit, Silverstone	12 September	European Le Mans Series; Le Mans Cup; Ligier European Series	2026 Eurocup-3 season is located in Europe
5	R2	(United Kingdom) Silverstone Circuit, Silverstone	13 September	European Le Mans Series; Le Mans Cup; Ligier European Series	2026 Eurocup-3 season is located in Europe
6	R1	(Spain) Circuito de Jerez, Jerez de la Frontera	26 September	F4 Spanish Championship; GR Cup Spain	2026 Eurocup-3 season is located in Europe
6	SR	(Spain) Circuito de Jerez, Jerez de la Frontera	26 September	F4 Spanish Championship; GR Cup Spain	2026 Eurocup-3 season is located in Europe
6	R2	(Spain) Circuito de Jerez, Jerez de la Frontera	27 September	F4 Spanish Championship; GR Cup Spain	2026 Eurocup-3 season is located in Europe
7	R1	(Hungary) Hungaroring, Mogyoród	24 October	TCR Eastern Europe Touring Car Series; Formula 4 CEZ Championship	2026 Eurocup-3 season is located in Europe
7	R2	(Hungary) Hungaroring, Mogyoród	25 October	TCR Eastern Europe Touring Car Series; Formula 4 CEZ Championship	2026 Eurocup-3 season is located in Europe
8	R1	(Spain) Circuit de Barcelona-Catalunya, Montmeló	7 November	GB3 Championship; TCR Spain Touring Car Championship	2026 Eurocup-3 season is located in Europe
8	R2	(Spain) Circuit de Barcelona-Catalunya, Montmeló	8 November	GB3 Championship; TCR Spain Touring Car Championship	2026 Eurocup-3 season is located in Europe

=== Season report ===
==== First half ====
The 2026 Eurocup-3 season began its main season at the Circuit Paul Ricard with Hitech's Keanu Al Azhari and MP's Gianmarco Pradel sharing pole positions in qualifying. Al Azhari stalled from pole position in the opening race, handing the lead to MP's René Lammers as Griffin Core's Alex Powell overtook Palou's James Egozi for second. Egozi quickly retook second and closed up to Lammers, before he claimed the lead with five minutes to go to take victory. Reversed-grid pole position went to Griffin Core's Enzo Tarnvanichkul, but Drivex driver Christopher El Feghali overtook him on the first lap. He maintained his lead to secure his first career single-seater victory, with Tarnvanichkul second as Egozi rose up the order to third. Race three began with Egozi jumping polesitter Pradel and MP's Ean Eyckmans to take the lead. Pradel then retired with a mechanical issue before Al Azhari and Egozi spent several laps battling for the lead. Al Azhari got in front in the end to claim victory, with Egozi taking second to end the weekend with a 13-point championship lead. Behind the pair, Powell, Lammers and Eyckmans battled over third place, with Powell taking it on the road before a post-race penalty handed the place to Eyckmans.

Round two at Portimão began with El Feghali taking pole position for the first race. He and Al Azhari had slow starts, allowing Lammers to take the lead. Egozi slotted into second, but attacked Lammers right away and took the lead at the end of the opening lap. El Feghali dropped to fourth, before hitting Powell while trying to move back into third. Powell was forced to retire, and El Feghali was handed a post-race penalty that handed third to Palou's Heitor Dall'Agnol. Egozi won the race before continuing his advantage into Sunday by taking pole position for race two. He held the lead at the start ahead of Eyckmans and controlled proceedings from then on. Three safety car phases punctured the race, but Egozi remained faultless to take his second victory of the weekend. Dall'Agnol took second ahead of Al Azhari, who was now 44 points behind leader Egozi in the standings.

Eurocup-3's debut at Imola Circuit began with Egozi claiming pole position in both qualifying sessions. The first race saw Egozi initially hold on to his lead throughout two safety car periods, before a mechanical issue forced him into retirement on lap eleven. That handed the lead to Dall'Agnol, who won on the road, but was handed a post-race penalty for an incident on the opening lap. Eyckmans inherited his maiden victory ahead of Powell, with Dall'Agnol dropping to third. The sprint race began with Tarnvanichkul stalling, before he was rear-ended and a five-car crash ensued, causing a red flag. Heuzenroeder led the restart from reversed-grid pole position and managed the rest of the race to take his maiden win. Mistakes for Tecnicar's Kacper Sztuka and Al Azhari dropped them out of podium contention, which, coupled with a post-race penalty for TC Racing's Juan Cota, saw Hitech's Gino Trappa and Pradel take second and third. Egozi was back in front for race three and took an unchallenged lights-to-flag victory. Behind him, teammate Rafaël Pérard spent the race fending off Sztuka to take his maiden podium. Al Azhari in fourth dropped to third in the standings, behind Eyckmans, who now trailed Egozi by 56 points.

The first half of the season ended at Monza Circuit began with Pérard following up his first podium with a maiden pole position for race one. Slow starts for Powell and Pradel from second and third saw Egozi climb from seventh to fourth as Pérard held the lead. Egozi continued his rise up the order with moves on Heuzenroeder and Al Azhari, before passing Pérard on lap ten. He fought back, but Egozi was able to hold him behind as Lammers claimed the final podium spot from El Feghali. The latter took pole position for race two and defended from Egozi, who locked up and fell to sixth. Dall'Agnol then attacked for the lead before making contact with Pérard and then with El Feghali, taking both out of the race. He then lost out to a recovering Egozi, who took his sixth victory of 2026 to grow his lead to 93 points as a post-race penalty promoted Lammers to second and Sztuka to third.

==== Second half ====
The series debuted at Silverstone Circuit for its fifth round of the season, and Al Azhari took pole position in both qualifying sessions. Eyckmans started race one in second, but dropped behind Lammers at the start, who attacked Al Azhari until the safety car was deployed. On the restart, Al Azhari was able to pull away and took victory, while Egozi took the final podium spot off Eyckmans. Wet conditions for the second race meant Al Azhari and second-placed Pradel both had slow starts, allowing Egozi to move from fourth to first in the opening lap. He gapped the field as a spin cost Pradel third place, handing it to Eyckmans. With three laps to go, an issue with Al Azhari's front wing saw him drop down the order. Eyckmans took second and Dall’Agnol third, with Al Azhari finishing seventh, allowing Egozi to again extend his championship lead to 107 points over Eyckmans.

Round six at the Circuito de Jerez began with Egozi on pole position for the first race as he set out to clinch the championship with two weekends to spare. Strauven qualified second, but was unable to threaten Egozi as the American quickly built a gap. Three safety car periods punctured the race, but Egozi handled all three restarts to take his eighth win of the year ahead of Strauven's maiden podium in second and Tarnvanichkul in third. Reverse-grid pole position went to Griffin Core debutant Maximilian Popov, but Al Azhari made the better start and took the lead. A red flag then came out after a crash further down in the field required barrier repairs, and nine minutes of racing after the restart saw no changes at the top, handing Al Azhari his first win of the season ahead of Popov and Pérard. Lammers took pole position for the third race and led Egozi through a first-lap safety car. He gapped the field after the restart to take his maiden victory, while Egozi in second sealed the championship title with a 122-point lead and Dall’Agnol took third place.

Another new circuit followed for round seven as the series raced at the Hungaroring, where Eyckmans took pole position for the first race. He lost out to Dall’Agnol and Al Azhari at the start and the pair began gapping the field. Egozi rose up from seventh on the grid to take third off Eyckmans. A late safety car brought the field back together, and Egozi attacked Al Azhari for second. He ran wide, allowing Eyckmans back onto the podium as Dall’Agnol secured his maiden victory. Egozi took pole position for race two and held his lead as Lammers moved up from fifth to second. He did that by jumping the start, however, so was handed a ten-second penalty. The top positions remained static for the rest of the race as Egozi took his ninth victory to break the series win record, Lammers dropped to 23rd after his penalty and Dall’Agnol and Al Azhari inherited second and third.

=== Race results ===
Round		Circuit	Pole position	Fastest lap	Winning driver	Winning team	Rookie winner
1	R1	(France) Circuit Paul Ricard	(United Arab Emirates) Keanu Al Azhari	(United Arab Emirates) Keanu Al Azhari	(United States) James Egozi	(Spain) Palou Motorsport	(Netherlands) René Lammers
1	SR	(France) Circuit Paul Ricard		(United States) James Egozi	(Lebanon) Christopher El Feghali	(Spain) Drivex	(Lebanon) Christopher El Feghali
1	R2	(France) Circuit Paul Ricard	(Australia) Gianmarco Pradel	(United Arab Emirates) Keanu Al Azhari	(United Arab Emirates) Keanu Al Azhari	(United Kingdom) Hitech	(United States) Alex Powell
2	R1	(Portugal) Algarve International Circuit	(Lebanon) Christopher El Feghali	(United States) James Egozi	(United States) James Egozi	(Spain) Palou Motorsport	(Netherlands) René Lammers
2	R2	(Portugal) Algarve International Circuit	(United States) James Egozi	(United States) James Egozi	(United States) James Egozi	(Spain) Palou Motorsport	(Brazil) Heitor Dall'Agnol
3	R1	(Italy) Imola Circuit	(United States) James Egozi	(United States) James Egozi (Note: James Egozi set the fastest lap but did not finish in the top ten, so he was ineligible to score the point for it. Heitor Dall'Agnol scored the point for setting the fastest lap among those finishing in the top ten.)	(Belgium) Ean Eyckmans (Note: Heitor Dall'Agnol originally won the race, but later received a 5-second time penalty for forcing another driver off the track. Ean Eyckmans, initially classified second, thus inherited the win.)	(Netherlands) MP Motorsport	(Belgium) Ean Eyckmans
3	SR	(Italy) Imola Circuit		(United States) James Egozi	(Australia) Patrick Heuzenroeder	(Spain) Griffin Core	(Argentina) Gino Trappa
3	R2	(Italy) Imola Circuit	(United States) James Egozi	(United States) James Egozi	(United States) James Egozi	(Spain) Palou Motorsport	(France) Rafaël Pérard
4	R1	(Italy) Monza Circuit	(France) Rafaël Pérard	(United States) James Egozi	(United States) James Egozi	(Spain) Palou Motorsport	(France) Rafaël Pérard
4	R2	(Italy) Monza Circuit	(Lebanon) Christopher El Feghali	(Lebanon) Christopher El Feghali	(United States) James Egozi	(Spain) Palou Motorsport	(Netherlands) René Lammers
5	R1	(United Kingdom) Silverstone Circuit	(United Arab Emirates) Keanu Al Azhari	(United States) James Egozi	(United Arab Emirates) Keanu Al Azhari	(United Kingdom) Hitech	(Netherlands) René Lammers
5	R2	(United Kingdom) Silverstone Circuit	(United Arab Emirates) Keanu Al Azhari	(United States) James Egozi	(United States) James Egozi	(Spain) Palou Motorsport	(Belgium) Ean Eyckmans
6	R1	(Spain) Circuito de Jerez	(United States) James Egozi	(United States) James Egozi	(United States) James Egozi	(Spain) Palou Motorsport	(Belgium) Thomas Strauven
6	SR	(Spain) Circuito de Jerez		(United Arab Emirates) Keanu Al Azhari	(United Arab Emirates) Keanu Al Azhari	(United Kingdom) Hitech	(France) Rafaël Pérard
6	R2	(Spain) Circuito de Jerez	(Netherlands) René Lammers	(United States) James Egozi	(Netherlands) René Lammers	(Netherlands) MP Motorsport	(Netherlands) René Lammers
7	R1	(Hungary) Hungaroring	(Belgium) Ean Eyckmans	(Brazil) Heitor Dall'Agnol	(Brazil) Heitor Dall'Agnol	(Spain) Palou Motorsport	(Brazil) Heitor Dall'Agnol
7	R2	(Hungary) Hungaroring	(United States) James Egozi	(United States) James Egozi	(United States) James Egozi	(Spain) Palou Motorsport	(Brazil) Heitor Dall'Agnol
8	R1	(Spain) Circuit de Barcelona-Catalunya	(United States) James Egozi	(United Arab Emirates) Keanu Al Azhari	(Brazil) Heitor Dall'Agnol	(Spain) Palou Motorsport	(Brazil) Heitor Dall'Agnol
8	R2	(Spain) Circuit de Barcelona-Catalunya	(United Arab Emirates) Keanu Al Azhari	(United Arab Emirates) Keanu Al Azhari	(United Arab Emirates) Keanu Al Azhari	(United Kingdom) Hitech	(Belgium) Ean Eyckmans

=== Championship standings ===
==== Scoring system ====
For races one and two, points were awarded to the top ten classified finishers, along with bonus points for pole position and fastest lap, as follows:

Position	**1st**	**2nd**	**3rd**	**4th**	**5th**	**6th**	**7th**	**8th**	**9th**	**10th**	**Pole**	**FL**
Points	25	18	15	12	10	8	6	4	2	1	2	1

For weekends holding three races, the shorter and reverse-grid sprint race awarded reduced points along with a bonus point for fastest lap, as follows:

Position	**1st**	**2nd**	**3rd**	**4th**	**5th**	**6th**	**7th**	**8th**	**9th**	**10th**	**FL**
Points	10	9	8	7	6	5	4	3	2	1	1

==== Drivers' Championship ====
Pos	Driver	LEC (France)			POR (Portugal)		IMO (Italy)			MNZ (Italy)		SIL (United Kingdom)		JER (Spain)			HUN (Hungary)		CAT (Spain)		Pts
Pos	Driver	R1	SR	R2	R1	R2	R1	SR	R2	R1	R2	R1	R2	R1	SR	R2	R1	R2	R1	R2	Pts
1	(United States) James Egozi	1	3	2	1	**1**	**Ret**	6	**1**	1	1	3	1	**1**	10	2	4	**1**	**3**	3	355
2	(United Arab Emirates) Keanu Al Azhari	**7**	7	1	6	3	Ret	22†	4	6	8	**1**	**7**	10	1	4	2	3	2	**1**	225
3	(Brazil) Heitor Dall'Agnol	8	6	12	3	2	3	Ret	5	17	16	6	3	6	5	3	1	2	1	5	199
4	(Belgium) Ean Eyckmans	4	4	3	Ret	4	1	4	6	8	5	5	2	13	4	8	**3**	5	5	2	194
5	(Netherlands) René Lammers	2	24	4	2	9	8	13	9	3	2	2	4	5	6	**1**	7	25	4	4	191
6	(Poland) Kacper Sztuka	12	12	7	5	Ret	5	5	3	Ret	3	7	17	11	11	Ret	6	6	27	10	85
7	(United States) Alex Powell	3	9	5	Ret	Ret	2	7	11	10	4			4	9	7					82
8	(France) Rafaël Pérard	6	21	13	4	Ret	24†	Ret	2	**2**	Ret	13	12	7	3	25	25	12	10	11	73
9	(Australia) Gianmarco Pradel	5	5	**Ret**	11	7	16	3	10	12	11	4	8	8	14	12	15	4	8	13	69
10	(Lebanon) Christopher El Feghali	14	1	9	**9**	Ret	Ret	15	8	4	**7**	11	14	9	7	6	10	24	Ret	6	64
11	(Belgium) Thomas Strauven	11	8	16	Ret	5	7	9	7	7	18	12	13	2	12	13	11	9	9	7	61
12	(Australia) Patrick Heuzenroeder	27	13	10	22	6	4	1	18	5	17	29†	5								51
13	(Thailand) Enzo Tarnvanichkul	9	2	17	23	10	6	Ret	DNS	11	9	9	9	3	8	10	8	10	Ret	Ret	50
14	(Argentina) Gino Trappa	Ret	27†	6	8	11	Ret	2	12	27	6	10	15	Ret	27†	16	19	14	7	12	36
15	(Argentina) Santino Panetta	10	11	8	10	8	9	Ret	15	16	21†	8	16	26†	15	9	5	7	14	9	36
16	(Spain) Dani Maciá									22	WD	26	27	14	16	5	9	13	6	24	20
17	(Italy) Maximilian Popov													12	2	11	23	8	24	8	17
18	(United Kingdom) Bart Harrison	15	14	18	7	14	23	17	14	9	Ret	17	6	15	19	14	22	11			16
19	(France) Rayan Caretti	13	Ret	19	21	24†	Ret	8	20	26	10	19	20	WD	WD	WD					4
20	(Brazil) Filippo Fiorentino	22	10	14	17	12	10	Ret	16	14	Ret	15	21	16	13	21	13	16	12	15	2
21	(Spain) Juan Cota						12	10	13	DNS	Ret			18	17	17			11	Ret	1
22	(Portugal) Francisco Macedo											14	10								1
23	(Angola) Lorenzo Campos	18	19	Ret	26	20	13	11	DNS	24	12	18	22	21	18	19	21	26	17	16	0
24	(Bulgaria) Stefan Bostandjiev	28	26	23	12	16	11	Ret	DNS	Ret	19	16	23	25	25	Ret	14	Ret	15	26	0
25	(Serbia) Andrej Petrović	16	18	11						21	Ret										0
26	(United Kingdom) James Hedley											21	11	23	Ret	Ret					0
27	(United Kingdom) Tommy Harfield				Ret	21	14	12	17	20	14										0
28	(Brazil) Alceu Feldmann Neto	24	Ret	25	13	22	18	Ret	DNS	13	Ret	24	26	19	20	15	29†	19	25	19	0
29	(United Kingdom) Casper Stevenson				15	13															0
30	(Costa Rica) Benjamín Beckley	26	22	27	20	17	21	19	25	23	13	27	28	24	24	24	20	18	22	21	0
31	(Philippines) Bianca Bustamante	Ret	18	21	14	18	15	16	19	25	DNS	25	24	Ret	DNS	22	Ret	17	20	Ret	0
32	(Greece) Stylianos Kolovos	20	Ret	22	16	15	20	14	21	18	20	Ret	29	22	21	Ret	17	20	26	23	0
33	(Argentina) Renzo Barbuy	25	23	Ret	24	23	17	Ret	23	19	15	23	25	Ret	23	20	26	23	23	25	0
34	(Sweden) Linus Lundqvist	17	15	24																	0
35	(Romania) Luca Viișoreanu	19	25	15	25	Ret															0
36	(United Kingdom) Nathan Tye									15	Ret										0
37	(United Kingdom) Kai Daryanani													17	22	18	28†	Ret	18	20	0
38	(United States) Andre Rodriguez	21	17	20																	0
39	(France) Édouard Borgna	23	20	26	19	19	22	18	22												0
40	(Germany) Valentin Kluss											22	18								0
41	(Germany) Jakob Bergmeister				18	Ret															0
42	(Spain) Nacho Tuñón						19	21	24†			20	19								0
43	(Monaco) Sam Urus											28	30	20	26	23					0
44	(Belgium) Yani Stevenheydens						Ret	20	Ret												0
—	(Ukraine) Oleksandr Bondarev									WD	WD										0
Guest drivers ineligible to score points:
—	(Singapore) Kabir Anurag																12	15			–
—	(United States) Rahim Alibhai																18	Ret	13	DNS	–
—	(United Kingdom) Dayton Coulthard																		16	14	–
—	(Austria) Oscar Wurz																16	27			–
—	(Brazil) Bernardo Gentil																		21	17	–
—	(Monaco) Matteo Giaccardi																		Ret	18	–
—	(United Kingdom) Josh McLean																24	21	19	22	–
—	(Andorra) Frank Porté Ruiz																27	22			–
Pos	Driver	R1	SR	R2	R1	R2	R1	SR	R2	R1	R2	R1	R2	R1	SR	R2	R1	R2	R1	R2	Pts
Pos	Driver	LEC (France)			POR (Portugal)		IMO (Italy)			MNZ (Italy)		SIL (United Kingdom)		JER (Spain)			HUN (Hungary)		CAT (Spain)		Pts

Colour	Result
Gold	Winner
Silver	Second place
Bronze	Third place
Green	Points classification
Blue	Non-points classification
Blue	Non-classified finish (NC)
Purple	Retired, not classified (Ret)
Red	Did not qualify (DNQ)
Red	Did not pre-qualify (DNPQ)
Black	Disqualified (DSQ)
White	Did not start (DNS)
White	Withdrew (WD)
White	Race cancelled (C)
Blank	Did not practice (DNP)
Blank	Did not arrive (DNA)
Blank	Excluded (EX)

**Bold** – Pole

Italics – Fastest Lap

† — Did not finish, but classified

Rookie

==== Teams' Championship ====
Each team acquired the points earned by their two highest finishing drivers in each race., along with bonus points for fastest laps if applicable.

Pos	Team	LEC (France)			POR (Portugal)		IMO (Italy)			MNZ (Italy)		SIL (United Kingdom)		JER (Spain)			HUN (Hungary)		CAT (Spain)		Pts
Pos	Team	R1	SR	R2	R1	R2	R1	SR	R2	R1	R2	R1	R2	R1	SR	R2	R1	R2	R1	R2	Pts
1	(Spain) Palou Motorsport	1	3	2	1	1	3	6	1	1	1	3	1	1	3	2	1	1	1	3	579
1	(Spain) Palou Motorsport	6	6	12	3	2	Ret	17	2	2	16	6	3	6	5	3	4	2	3	5	579
2	(Netherlands) MP Motorsport	2	4	3	2	4	1	3	6	3	2	2	2	5	4	1	3	4	4	2	417
2	(Netherlands) MP Motorsport	4	5	4	11	7	8	4	9	8	5	4	4	8	6	8	7	5	5	4	417
3	(United Kingdom) Hitech	7	7	1	6	3	9	2	4	6	6	1	7	10	1	4	2	3	2	1	283
3	(United Kingdom) Hitech	10	11	6	8	8	11	22†	12	16	8	8	15	25	15	9	5	7	7	9	283
4	(Spain) Griffin Core	3	2	5	22	5	2	1	7	5	4	9	5	2	2	7	8	8	9	7	226
4	(Spain) Griffin Core	9	8	10	23	6	4	7	11	7	9	12	9	3	8	10	11	9	24	8	226
5	(Spain) Tecnicar by Amtog	12	12	7	5	13	5	5	3	21	3	7	17	11	11	5	6	6	6	10	105
5	(Spain) Tecnicar by Amtog	16	16	11	15	17	19	19	24†	23	13	20	19	14	16	24	9	13	22	21	105
6	(Spain) Drivex	14	1	9	9	13	10	14	8	4	7	11	14	9	7	6	10	16	12	6	62
6	(Spain) Drivex	20	10	14	16	15	20	15	16	14	20	15	21	16	13	21	13	20	21	15	62
7	(United Kingdom) Double R Racing	15	14	18	7	16	13	11	13	9	12	17	6	15	18	14	21	11	16	14	16
7	(United Kingdom) Double R Racing	17	15	24	26	20	14	12	17	20	14	18	11	21	19	19	22	21	17	16	16
8	(Spain) GRS Team	13	17	19	18	24†	Ret	8	20	22	10	19	20	17	22	18	27	22	11	20	4
8	(Spain) GRS Team	21	Ret	20	21	Ret	Ret	20	Ret	26	WD	26	27	WD	WD	WD	28†	Ret	18	Ret	4
9	(Spain) TC Racing	19	23	15	24	23	12	10	13	19	15	22	18	18	17	17	18	23	13	25	1
9	(Spain) TC Racing	25	25	Ret	25	Ret	17	Ret	23	DNS	Ret	23	25	Ret	23	20	26	Ret	23	DNS	1
Pos	Team	R1	SR	R2	R1	R2	R1	SR	R2	R1	R2	R1	R2	R1	SR	R2	R1	R2	R1	R2	Pts
Pos	Team	LEC (France)			POR (Portugal)		IMO (Italy)			MNZ (Italy)		SIL (United Kingdom)		JER (Spain)			HUN (Hungary)		CAT (Spain)		Pts

== Winter series ==
The second running of the Eurocup-3 Spanish Winter Championship was held over three weekends and comprised nine races. Hitech driver Keanu Al Azhari won the Drivers' Championship title with a race to spare. MP Motorsport's René Lammers came third overall to claim the Rookie Championship, while Campos Racing won the Teams' Championship.

=== Teams and drivers ===
Teams utilized the same Dallara 326 chassis powered by a Toyota three-cylinder 1.6-litre turbo engine and running Hankook tires used in the main series.

Team	No.	Driver	Status	Rounds
(Spain) Tecnicar by Amtog	2	(Poland) Kacper Sztuka		All
(Spain) Tecnicar by Amtog	20	(Costa Rica) Benjamín Beckley	R	All
(Netherlands) MP Motorsport	4	(Belgium) Ean Eyckmans	R	All
(Netherlands) MP Motorsport	12	(Australia) Gianmarco Pradel		All
(Netherlands) MP Motorsport	17	(Brazil) Alceu Feldmann Neto		All
(Netherlands) MP Motorsport	99	(Netherlands) René Lammers	R	All
(Spain) Campos Racing	5	(Australia) Patrick Heuzenroeder		All
(Spain) Campos Racing	9	(Belgium) Thomas Strauven	R	All
(Spain) Campos Racing	10	(Thailand) Enzo Tarnvanichkul		All
(Spain) Campos Racing	41	(United States) Alex Powell	R	All
(Spain) Drivex	6	(Greece) Stylianos Kolovos	R	All
(Spain) Drivex	7	(Lebanon) Christopher El Feghali	R	All
(Spain) Drivex	13	(Spain) Daniel Nogales		1
(Spain) Drivex	37	(Brazil) Filippo Fiorentino	R	All
(Spain) TC Racing	11	(Romania) Luca Viișoreanu	R	All
(Spain) TC Racing	31	(Argentina) Renzo Barbuy	R	All
(United Kingdom) Hitech	14	(United Arab Emirates) Keanu Al Azhari		All
(United Kingdom) Hitech	23	(Bulgaria) Stefan Bostandjiev		All
(United Kingdom) Hitech	39	(Argentina) Santino Panetta	R	All
(United Kingdom) Hitech	84	(Argentina) Gino Trappa	R	All
(Spain) Palou Motorsport	16	(Philippines) Bianca Bustamante		All
(Spain) Palou Motorsport	27	(Brazil) Heitor Dall'Agnol	R	All
(Spain) Palou Motorsport	33	(France) Rafaël Pérard	R	All
(Spain) Palou Motorsport	48	(United States) James Egozi		All
(United Kingdom) Double R Racing	26	(China) Yuanpu Cui		All
(United Kingdom) Double R Racing	77	(United Kingdom) Bart Harrison	R	All
(United Kingdom) Double R Racing	91	(Angola) Lorenzo Campos	R	All
(Spain) GRS Team	29	(Argentina) Gianni Giovanelli	R	All
(Spain) GRS Team	74	(Belgium) Yani Stevenheydens		All

Icon	Legend
**R**	Rookie

- Andre Rodriguez was originally announced to compete for GRS Team, but did not enter any rounds.

=== Calendar ===
The schedule was announced on 21 November 2025. The winter series did not return to Circuito de Jerez, instead opting to race at Circuito del Jarama. All three events were held using the three-round format that adds a sprint race to the weekend.

Round		Circuit	Date	Support bill	Map of circuit locations
1	R1	(Portugal) Algarve International Circuit, Portimão	21 February	Eurocup-4 SWC	2026 Eurocup-3 season is located in Iberia
1	SR	(Portugal) Algarve International Circuit, Portimão	21 February	Eurocup-4 SWC	2026 Eurocup-3 season is located in Iberia
1	R2	(Portugal) Algarve International Circuit, Portimão	22 February	Eurocup-4 SWC	2026 Eurocup-3 season is located in Iberia
2	R1	(Spain) Circuito del Jarama, San Sebastián de los Reyes	28 February	Eurocup-4 SWC; TCR Spain; Toyota GR Cup Spain; Copa Clio España	2026 Eurocup-3 season is located in Iberia
2	SR	(Spain) Circuito del Jarama, San Sebastián de los Reyes	28 February	Eurocup-4 SWC; TCR Spain; Toyota GR Cup Spain; Copa Clio España	2026 Eurocup-3 season is located in Iberia
2	R2	(Spain) Circuito del Jarama, San Sebastián de los Reyes	1 March	Eurocup-4 SWC; TCR Spain; Toyota GR Cup Spain; Copa Clio España	2026 Eurocup-3 season is located in Iberia
3	R1	(Spain) MotorLand Aragón, Alcañiz	14 March	Eurocup-4 SWC; Copa Clio España; Campeonato de España de GT	2026 Eurocup-3 season is located in Iberia
3	SR	(Spain) MotorLand Aragón, Alcañiz	14 March	Eurocup-4 SWC; Copa Clio España; Campeonato de España de GT	2026 Eurocup-3 season is located in Iberia
3	R2	(Spain) MotorLand Aragón, Alcañiz	15 March	Eurocup-4 SWC; Copa Clio España; Campeonato de España de GT	2026 Eurocup-3 season is located in Iberia

=== Season report ===
The opening weekend of the 2026 winter season took place at the Algarve International Circuit, and MP Motorsport's Ean Eyckmans took pole position in the first qualifying session. The first Eurocup-3 race using the Dallara 326 began with multiple cars stalling off the line, among them polesitter Eyckmans and Campos Racing's P3 starter Alex Powell. That saw Campos's Thomas Strauven take the lead, before Palou Motorsport's James Egozi overtook him later in the lap. Multiple safety car phases followed before Hitech's Keanu Al Azhari and MP's René Lammers both moved past Strauven to complete the podium behind Egozi. TC Racing's Luca Viișoreanu had reversed-grid pole position for race two, but Hitech's Gino Trappa and Egozi moved past him straight away. Egozi claimed the lead later on, before contact sent Trappa down the order, allowing Al Azhari and Powell to claim podium spots. Qualifying for the third race saw Al Azhari take pole position. He initially lost out to Eyckmans at the start, but shadowed him before retaking the lead on lap two. The top two remained static afterwards while Lammers secured third. Egozi finished outside the points after stalling at the start, so Al Azhari claimed the championship lead.

Round two was held at Circuito del Jarama, where MP's Gianmarco Pradel narrowly beat Al Azhari and Eyckmans to pole position for the opening race. Eyckmans stalled at the start, allowing Lammers into third place as Pradel locked up and came under attack from Al Azhari. Two safety car phases punctured the race, and the Emirati tried claiming the lead on each restart before finally getting past Pradel on lap 15 and winning the race. The reversed grid for race two saw the Drivex of Christopher El Feghali start in first place, but a slow start saw Hitech's Stefan Bostandjiev take the lead right away before El Feghali hit two cars entering the first turn, causing a red flag. Bostandjiev held the lead at the restart ahead of Palou's Heitor Dall'Agnol and Powell, and was handed victory when the race finished under safety car conditions. Al Azhari claimed pole position for race three, but an off into turn two saw him drop to the back as Lammers took the lead. Powell overtook him mid-race and finished first, but post-race penalties saw him and Lammers dropped down the order. Egozi inherited the win ahead of teammate Rafaël Pérard and Campos's Enzo Tarnvanichkul, with Al Azhari recovering to fifth to retain a 33-point standings lead.

The winter series’ final weekend at MotorLand Aragón began with a third pole position for Al Azhari. Double R Racing’s Bart Harrison started alongside him, but Egozi passed him on the opening lap before taking the lead on lap two. Al Azhari fought back, with the pair swapping first place throughout multiple safety car interruptions and restarts. Egozi took victory in the end to prolong the championship fight as Lammers beat Powell to third place. Pole position for the sprint race went to Pradel ahead of El Feghali, with Lammers quickly climbing to third at the start. He and Campos’s Patrick Heuzenroeder attacked El Feghali for second before contact between the latter two saw both drop out of contention. Lammers took second, with Al Azhari clinching the title in third after Egozi also retired following contact with Harrison. Tarnvanichkul took pole position for the final race. El Feghali started second and the top two remained static until the latter began falling down the order. Al Azhari started 16th and spent the race rising up the order, finishing third behind Pradel after on-track podium finishers Lammers and Powell incurred penalties. Egozi failed to start the final race and so Al Azhari ended up with a 52-point lead.

=== Race results ===
Round		Circuit	Pole position	Fastest lap	Winning driver	Winning team	Rookie winner
1	R1	(Portugal) Algarve International Circuit, Portimão	(Belgium) Ean Eyckmans	(United States) James Egozi	(United States) James Egozi	(Spain) Palou Motorsport	(Netherlands) René Lammers
1	SR	(Portugal) Algarve International Circuit, Portimão		(United States) Alex Powell	(United States) James Egozi	(Spain) Palou Motorsport	(United States) Alex Powell
1	R2	(Portugal) Algarve International Circuit, Portimão	(United Arab Emirates) Keanu Al Azhari	(United Arab Emirates) Keanu Al Azhari	(United Arab Emirates) Keanu Al Azhari	(United Kingdom) Hitech	(Belgium) Ean Eyckmans
2	R1	(Spain) Circuito del Jarama, San Sebastián de los Reyes	(Australia) Gianmarco Pradel	(United Arab Emirates) Keanu Al Azhari	(United Arab Emirates) Keanu Al Azhari	(United Kingdom) Hitech	(Netherlands) René Lammers
2	SR	(Spain) Circuito del Jarama, San Sebastián de los Reyes		(Bulgaria) Stefan Bostandjiev	(Bulgaria) Stefan Bostandjiev	(United Kingdom) Hitech	(Brazil) Heitor Dall'Agnol
2	R2	(Spain) Circuito del Jarama, San Sebastián de los Reyes	(United Arab Emirates) Keanu Al Azhari	(Netherlands) René Lammers	(United States) James Egozi	(Spain) Palou Motorsport	(France) Rafaël Pérard
3	R1	(Spain) MotorLand Aragón, Alcañiz	(United Arab Emirates) Keanu Al Azhari	(United Arab Emirates) Keanu Al Azhari	(United States) James Egozi	(Spain) Palou Motorsport	(Netherlands) René Lammers
3	SR	(Spain) MotorLand Aragón, Alcañiz		(Netherlands) René Lammers	(Australia) Gianmarco Pradel	(Netherlands) MP Motorsport	(Netherlands) René Lammers
3	R2	(Spain) MotorLand Aragón, Alcañiz	(Thailand) Enzo Tarnvanichkul	(Belgium) Thomas Strauven	(Thailand) Enzo Tarnvanichkul	(Spain) Campos Racing	(Netherlands) René Lammers

=== Championship standings ===
==== Scoring system ====
For the first and last races of the weekend, points were awarded to the top ten classified finishers, along with bonus points for pole position and fastest lap, as follows:

Position	**1st**	**2nd**	**3rd**	**4th**	**5th**	**6th**	**7th**	**8th**	**9th**	**10th**	**Pole**	**FL**
Points	25	18	15	12	10	8	6	4	2	1	2	1

The reverse-grid second race of the weekend, called the sprint race, is shorter and therefore awarded reduced points along with a bonus point for fastest lap, as follows:

Position	**1st**	**2nd**	**3rd**	**4th**	**5th**	**6th**	**7th**	**8th**	**9th**	**10th**	**FL**
Points	10	9	8	7	6	5	4	3	2	1	1

==== Drivers' Championship ====
Pos	Driver	POR (Portugal)			JAR (Spain)			ARA (Spain)			Pts
Pos	Driver	R1	SR	R2	R1	SR	R2	R1	SR	R2	Pts
1	(United Arab Emirates) Keanu Al Azhari	2	2	**1**	1	4	**5**	**2**	3	3	144
2	(United States) James Egozi	1	1	13	7	Ret	1	1	Ret	DNS	92
3	(Netherlands) René Lammers	3	Ret	3	3	14	17	3	2	4	83
4	(Thailand) Enzo Tarnvanichkul	8	9	6	5	Ret	3	6	5	**1**	80
5	(United States) Alex Powell	12	3	4	4	3	6	4	6	6	74
6	(Australia) Gianmarco Pradel	Ret	15	7	**2**	8	21	8	1	2	61
7	(Belgium) Ean Eyckmans	**10**	4	2	23†	5	Ret	7	8	5	53
8	(Belgium) Thomas Strauven	4	7	5	Ret	7	8	10	4	19	43
9	(Australia) Patrick Heuzenroeder	5	Ret	15	17	6	7	5	25†	Ret	31
10	(France) Rafaël Pérard	Ret	23	8	Ret	18	2	18	9	Ret	24
11	(Lebanon) Christopher El Feghali	6	8	Ret	8	Ret	25†	9	26†	22†	17
12	(Bulgaria) Stefan Bostandjiev	15	6	Ret	15	1	22	14	17	12	16
13	(Argentina) Gino Trappa	Ret	25†	Ret	11	22	4	19	12	8	16
14	(Belgium) Yani Stevenheydens	7	5	16	14	10	9	Ret	16	Ret	15
15	(Brazil) Heitor Dall'Agnol	18	24†	10	10	2	14	15	13	16	11
16	(Brazil) Filippo Fiorentino	11	16	9	6	15	20	Ret	11	11	10
17	(China) Yuanpu Cui	14	14	12	9	12	10	22	19	7	9
18	(Argentina) Santino Panetta	17	19	14	13	9	11	12	7	9	8
19	(Brazil) Alceu Feldmann Neto	9	10	11	16	11	12	23	23	15	3
20	(Romania) Luca Viișoreanu	21	21	17	22†	13	16	11	14	10	1
21	(Angola) Lorenzo Campos	20	12	19	Ret	16	Ret	21	10	14	1
22	(Spain) Daniel Nogales	19	11	Ret							0
23	(Poland) Kacper Sztuka	13	20	24†	12	20	24†	25	18	Ret	0
24	(Argentina) Renzo Barbuy	23	18	22	21	21	13	13	20	17	0
25	(Greece) Stylianos Kolovos	22	Ret	20	19	Ret	18	16	21	13	0
26	(Philippines) Bianca Bustamante	24	13	21	18	Ret	15	20	Ret	18	0
27	(United Kingdom) Bart Harrison	16	17	18	24†	17	19	Ret	15	Ret	0
28	(Argentina) Gianni Giovanelli	25	Ret	Ret	20	19	23	17	24	21	0
29	(Costa Rica) Benjamín Beckley	Ret	22	23	Ret	DNS	Ret	24	22	20	0
Pos	Driver	R1	SR	R2	R1	SR	R2	R1	SR	R2	Pts
Pos	Driver	POR (Portugal)			JAR (Spain)			ARA (Spain)			Pts

Colour	Result
Gold	Winner
Silver	Second place
Bronze	Third place
Green	Points classification
Blue	Non-points classification
Blue	Non-classified finish (NC)
Purple	Retired, not classified (Ret)
Red	Did not qualify (DNQ)
Red	Did not pre-qualify (DNPQ)
Black	Disqualified (DSQ)
White	Did not start (DNS)
White	Withdrew (WD)
White	Race cancelled (C)
Blank	Did not practice (DNP)
Blank	Did not arrive (DNA)
Blank	Excluded (EX)

**Bold** – Pole

Italics – Fastest Lap

† — Did not finish, but classified

Rookie

==== Teams' Championship ====
Each team acquired the points earned by their two highest finishing drivers in each race., along with bonus points for fastest laps if applicable.

Pos	Team	POR (Portugal)			JAR (Spain)			ARA (Spain)			Pts
Pos	Team	R1	SR	R2	R1	SR	R2	R1	SR	R2	Pts
1	(Spain) Campos Racing	4	3	4	4	3	3	4	4	1	181
1	(Spain) Campos Racing	5	7	5	5	6	6	5	5	6	181
2	(Netherlands) MP Motorsport	3	4	2	2	5	12	3	1	2	176
2	(Netherlands) MP Motorsport	9	10	3	3	8	17	7	2	4	176
3	(United Kingdom) Hitech	2	2	1	1	1	4	2	3	3	174
3	(United Kingdom) Hitech	15	6	14	11	4	5	12	7	8	174
4	(Spain) Palou Motorsport	1	1	8	7	2	1	1	9	16	127
4	(Spain) Palou Motorsport	18	13	10	10	18	2	15	13	18	127
5	(Spain) Drivex	6	8	9	6	15	18	9	11	11	27
5	(Spain) Drivex	11	11	20	8	Ret	20	16	21	13	27
6	(Spain) GRS Team	7	5	16	14	10	9	17	16	21	15
6	(Spain) GRS Team	25	Ret	Ret	20	19	23	Ret	24	Ret	15
7	(United Kingdom) Double R Racing	14	12	12	9	12	10	21	10	7	10
7	(United Kingdom) Double R Racing	16	14	18	24†	16	19	22	15	14	10
8	(Spain) TC Racing	21	18	17	21	13	13	11	14	10	1
8	(Spain) TC Racing	23	21	22	22†	21	16	13	20	17	1
9	(Spain) Tecnicar by Amtog	13	20	23	12	20	24	24	18	20	0
9	(Spain) Tecnicar by Amtog	Ret	22	24†	Ret	DNS	Ret	25	22	Ret	0
Pos	Team	R1	SR	R2	R1	SR	R2	R1	SR	R2	Pts
Pos	Team	POR (Portugal)			JAR (Spain)			ARA (Spain)			Pts
