= Eurocup-3 =

Single-Seater Racing Championship

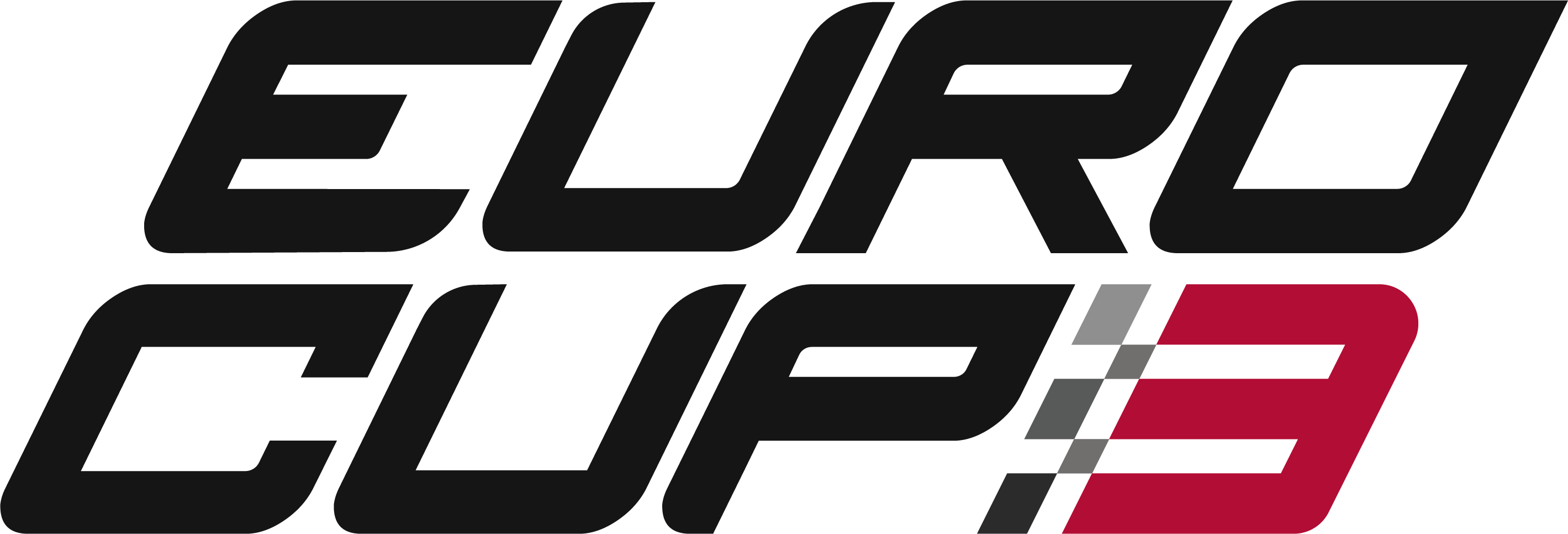
- Category: Formula Regional
- Region: Europe
- Inaugural season: 2023
- Constructors: Dallara (since 2026)
- Engine suppliers: TOM'S (since 2026)
- Tyre suppliers: Hankook
- Drivers' champion: (United States) James Egozi
- Teams' champion: (Spain) Palou Motorsport
- Official website: Official website

Eurocup-3 is a formula racing series regulated according to Formula Regional regulations. The series is founded for levelling up the competition for all drivers, with each team committing on a maximum budget of €400,000 every season.

== History ==
The championship was inaugurated in 2023, and was formed as an alternative to the FIA-sanctioned Formula Regional European Championship and the Euroformula Open Championship, especially after the latter series struggled to attract entries in late 2022.

== Cars ==
In its first three seasons, all competitors used the identical Tatuus F3 T-318 chassis from the Formula Regional European Championship, but upgraded with a new intercooler, updated body kit, and battery kit. This updated car is called as the Tatuus F3 T-318-EC3, and it weighs 25 kg (55 lb) less than the Tatuus F3 T-318. The car is fitted with a 1.75 L 270 hp (200 kW) Alfa Romeo-Autotecnica turbocharged inline-3 engine, with a push-to-pass system which provides an additional 25 hp (19 kW).

In 2026, Eurocup-3 switched to a new spec chassis, the Dallara 326. It has the same structural design as Dallara 324, which is currently used in Euroformula Open Championship and Super Formula Lights. The engine is a 1.6 L 275 hp (205 kW) turbocharged inline-3 developed by TOM'S based on the Toyota G16E-GTS.

Hankook is the tire supplier since the first season.

== Champions ==
=== Drivers ===
Season	Driver	Team	Races	Poles	Wins	Podiums	Fastest lap	Points	Margins	Ref
2023	(France) Esteban Masson	(Spain) Campos Racing	16 of 16	6	8	10	7	273	30	
2024	(Singapore) Christian Ho	(Spain) Campos Racing	16 of 16	7	6	9	5	255	5	
2025	(Italy) Mattia Colnaghi	(Netherlands) MP Motorsport	14 of 16	3	4	9	5	256	35	

=== Teams ===
Season	Team	Poles	Wins	Podiums	Fastest lap	Points	Margins	Ref
2023	(Spain) Campos Racing	9	10	21	8	516	2	
2024	(Netherlands) MP Motorsport	7	9	23	5	561	99	
2025	(Netherlands) MP Motorsport					552	180	

== Circuits ==
- **Bold** denotes a circuit is used in the 2026 season.
- **Italic** denotes a circuit is used in the 2027 season.

Number	Circuits	Rounds	Years
1	(Spain) **Circuito de Jerez**	4	2023–2026
1	(Spain) **Circuit de Barcelona-Catalunya**	4	2023–present
3	(Belgium) **Circuit de Spa-Francorchamps**	3	2023–2025, 2027
3	(Italy) **Monza Circuit**	3	2023, 2025–2026
3	(Portugal) **Algarve International Circuit**	3	2024–present
3	(France) **Circuit Paul Ricard**	3	2024–present
7	(Spain) MotorLand Aragón	2	2023–2024
7	(Netherlands) Circuit Zandvoort	2	2023–2024
7	(Austria) Red Bull Ring	2	2024–2025
10	(Portugal) Circuito do Estoril	1	2023
10	(Spain) Circuit Ricardo Tormo	1	2023
10	(Netherlands) TT Circuit Assen	1	2025
10	(Italy) **Imola Circuit**	1	2026–2027
10	(United Kingdom) **Silverstone Circuit**	1	2026–2027
10	(Hungary) **Hungaroring**	1	2026–2027
16	(Germany) **Hockenheimring**	0	2027
