= Enzo Tarnvanichkul =

Thai-Spanish racing driver (born 2009)

- เอ็นโซ ธารวานิชกุล
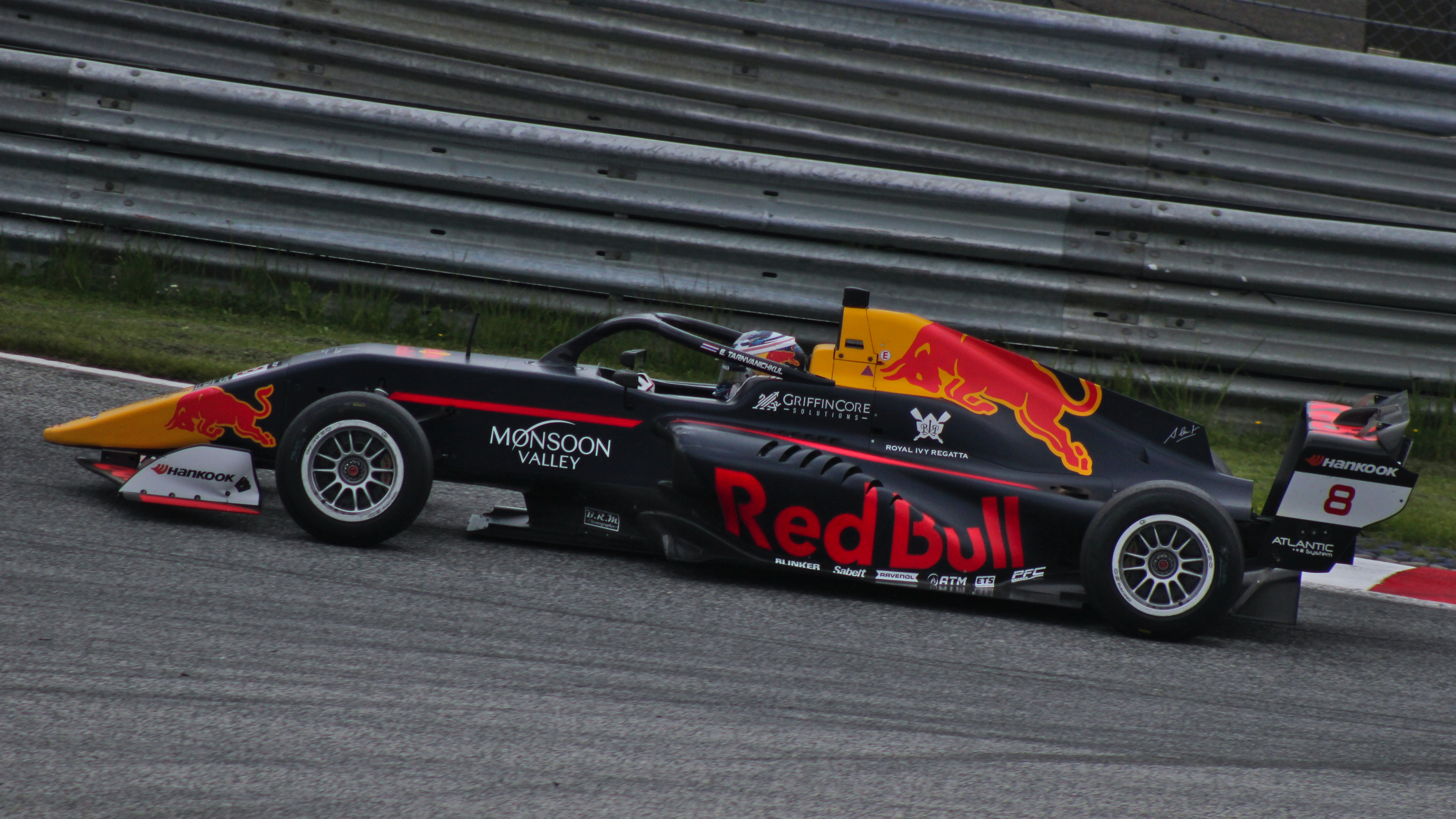
- Tarnvanichkul driving at the Red Bull Ring during the 2025 Eurocup-3 season
- Born: 22 February 2009 (age 17); Marbella, Spain
- Nationality: (Thailand) Thai

Eurocup-3 career
- Debut season: 2025
- Current team: Griffin Core by Campos
- Car number: 10
- Starts: 36
- Wins: 1
- Podiums: 5
- Poles: 0
- Fastest laps: 0
- Best finish: 8th in 2025

Previous series
- 2025; 2025–2026; 2024; 2024: GB3; Eurocup-3 Spanish Winter; F4 Spanish; Formula Winter Series
- Statistics up to date as of 16 November 2026.

Enzo Tarnvanichkul Suphaveera (born 22 February 2009) is a Thai-Spanish racing driver who last competed in Eurocup-3 for Griffin Core by Campos as part of the Red Bull Junior Team.

Tarnvanichkul previously raced for Campos in the 2024 F4 Spanish Championship..

== Career ==
=== Karting (2018–2023) ===
Tarnvanichkul has had a strong karting career since moving to the European stage in late 2018, with his first competition being the 2018 WSK Final Cup in the 60 Mini category. However, it wasn't until 2022 when he won his first major title, and it came at the most prestigious karting event, the CIK-FIA World Championship. He won the title in the OK-Junior category. This attracted the Red Bull Junior Team, which he joined the following year.

=== Formula 4 (2024) ===
In late January 2024, Tarnvanichkul was announced to be making his car-racing debut in the 2024 F4 Spanish Championship with Campos Racing. In preparation for the main season, he competed in the final two rounds of the 2024 Formula Winter Series. Unfortunately, due to his inexperience, Tarnvanichkul finished with a bad result of 32nd in the championship with a best result of 11th, improving from his first round results. He had little success in F4 Spanish Championship, scoring points in the first round at Jarama. After a rough start to the season with just two points finishes from the first two rounds, Tarnvanichkul's form improved considerably over the course of the season, securing his first podium at the Circuit Ricardo Tormo in the fourth round. This would prove to be his sole podium finish of the season, as he recovered his season to finish 12th in the drivers' standings, on 69 points.

=== Formula Regional (2025–present) ===
==== 2025 ====
In January 2025, it was announced that Tarnvanichkul would be contesting the 2025 Eurocup-3 season with Campos Racing. He also joined the team for the final two rounds of the Eurocup-3 Spanish Winter Championship, where he finished 13th in the standings with 22 points, his best finish being two sixth in Portimão and in MotorLand Aragón.

Tarnvanichkul also contested in selected rounds of the 2025 GB3 Championship with VRD Racing.

==== 2026 ====
Tarnvanichkul remained with Campos for a second season of Eurocup-3 in 2026.

=== Formula One ===
On 18 January 2023, it was reported that Tarnvanichkul would join the Red Bull Junior Team alongside Frenchman Enzo Deligny, after their strong performances in karting.

== Karting record ==
=== Karting career summary ===
Season	Series	Team	Position
2018	WSK Final Cup - 60 Mini	Gamoto ASD	45th
2019	WSK Champions Cup - 60 Mini	Gamoto ASD	8th
2019	WSK Super Master Series - 60 Mini	Gamoto ASD	60th
2019	South Garda Winter Cup - 60 Mini	Gamoto ASD	17th
2019	WSK Euro Series - 60 Mini	Gamoto ASD	18th
2019	Andrea Margutti Trophy - 60 Mini	Gamoto ASD	25th
2019	WSK Open Cup - 60 Mini	BabyRace Driver Academy	3rd
2019	WSK Final Cup - 60 Mini	BabyRace Driver Academy	26th
2019	IAME Euro Series - X30 Mini	BabyRace Driver Academy	56th
2019	ROK Cup Superfinal - Mini Rok	BabyRace Driver Academy	5th
2019	Trofeo delle Industrie - 60 Mini	BabyRace Driver Academy	25th
2019	Macao International Grand Prix - Mini Rok		3rd
2020	WSK Champions Cup - 60 Mini	Gamoto ASD	8th
2020	WSK Super Master Series - 60 Mini	Gamoto ASD	60th
2020	South Garda Winter Cup - Mini Rok	Gamoto ASD	17th
2020	WSK Euro Series - 60 Mini	Energy Corse	16th
2020	ROK Cup International Final - Mini Rok	Energy Corse	38th
2020	Andrea Margutti Trophy - 60 Mini	Energy Corse	5th
2020	WSK Open Cup - 60 Mini	Energy Corse	16th
2020	Trofeo Ayrton Senna - Mini GR3	Team Driver Racing Kart	31st
2021	WSK Champions Cup - 60 Mini	Team Driver Racing Kart	8th
2021	WSK Super Master Series - 60 Mini	Team Driver Racing Kart	16th
2021	WSK Euro Series - 60 Mini	Team Driver Racing Kart	6th
2021	Andrea Margutti Trophy - 60 Mini	Team Driver Racing Kart	18th
2021	Italian ACI Championship - 60 Mini		7th
2021	WSK Open Cup - OKJ	Tony Kart Racing Team	38th
2021	Champions of the Future - OKJ	Tony Kart Racing Team	120th
2021	CIK-FIA World Championship - OKJ	Tony Kart Racing Team	31st
2021	South Garda Winter Cup - OKJ	Tony Kart Racing Team	14th
2022	WSK Champions Cup - OKJ	Tony Kart Racing Team	49th
2022	South Garda Winter Series - OKJ	Tony Kart Racing Team	12th
2022	Champions of the Future - OKJ	Tony Kart Racing Team	24th
2022	CIK-FIA European Championship - OKJ	Tony Kart Racing Team	5th
2022	WSK Euro Series - OKJ	Tony Kart Racing Team	22nd
2022	CIK-FIA World Championship - OKJ	Tony Kart Racing Team	1st
2022	WSK Open Cup - OKJ	Tony Kart Racing Team	15th
2022	WSK Final Cup - OKJ	Tony Kart Racing Team	2nd
2023	IAME Winter Cup - X30 Senior	KR Motorsport	49th
2023	WSK Super Master Series - OK	Prema Racing	17th
2023	Champions of the Future - OK	Prema Racing	4th
2023	CIK-FIA European Championship - OK	Prema Racing	9th
2023	WSK Euro Series - OK	Prema Racing	16th
2023	CIK-FIA World Championship - OK	Prema Racing	4th

== Racing record ==
=== Racing career summary ===
Season	Series	Team	Races	Wins	Poles	F/Laps	Podiums	Points	Position
2024	Formula Winter Series	Campos Racing	5	0	0	0	0	0	32nd
2024	F4 Spanish Championship	Campos Racing	21	0	0	0	1	69	12th
2025	Eurocup-3 Spanish Winter Championship	Campos Racing	5	0	0	0	0	22	13th
2025	Eurocup-3	Campos Racing	18	1	0	0	3	98	8th
2025	GB3 Championship	VRD Racing	15	1	0	0	1	122	17th
2026	Eurocup-3 Spanish Winter Championship	Campos Racing	9	1	1	0	2	80	4th
2026	Eurocup-3	Campos Racing	18	0	0	0	2	50	13th

* Season still in progress.

=== Complete Formula Winter Series results ===
(key) (Races in bold indicate pole position; races in italics indicate fastest lap)

Year	Team	1	2	3	4	5	6	7	8	9	10	11	12	DC	Points
2024	Campos Racing	JER; 1	JER; 2	JER; 3	CRT; 1	CRT; 2	CRT; 3	ARA; 1; 22	ARA; 2; 30	ARA; 3; 30†	CAT; 1 C	CAT; 2; 23	CAT; 3; 11	32nd	0

=== Complete F4 Spanish Championship results ===
(key) (Races in bold indicate pole position; races in italics indicate fastest lap)

Year	Team	1	2	3	4	5	6	7	8	9	10	11	12	13	14	15	16	17	18	19	20	21	DC	Points
2024	Campos Racing	JAR; 1; 12	JAR; 2; 7	JAR; 3; 29	POR; 1; 15	POR; 2; 27†	POR; 3; 10	LEC; 1; 18	LEC; 2; 20	LEC; 3; 15	ARA; 1; 4	ARA; 2; 5	ARA; 3; 10	CRT; 1; 3	CRT; 2; 6	CRT; 3; 13	JER; 1; 26†	JER; 2; 30	JER; 3; 17	CAT; 1; 5	CAT; 2; 16	CAT; 3; 4	12th	69

=== Complete Eurocup-3 Spanish Winter Championship results ===
(key) (Races in bold indicate pole position) (Races in italics indicate fastest lap)

Year	Team	1	2	3	4	5	6	7	8	9	DC	Points
2025	Campos Racing	JER; 1	JER; 2	JER; 3	POR; 1; 6	POR; 2; 19	POR; 3; 8	ARA; 1; 12	ARA; 2; 6		13th	22
2026	Campos Racing	POR; 1; 8	POR; 2; 9	POR; 3; 6	JAR; 1; 5	JAR; 2 Ret	JAR; 3; 3	ARA; 1; 6	ARA; 2; 5	**ARA**; **3**; 1	4th	80

=== Complete Eurocup-3 results ===
(key) (Races in bold indicate pole position) (Races in italics indicate fastest lap)

Year	Team	1	2	3	4	5	6	7	8	9	10	11	12	13	14	15	16	17	18	19	DC	Points
2025	Campos Racing	RBR; 1; 9	RBR; 2; 14	POR; 1; 22	POR; SR; 9	POR; 2; 4	LEC; 1; 6	LEC; SR; 6	LEC; 2; 12	MNZ; 1; 17	MNZ; 2; 3	ASS; 1; 10	ASS; 2; 21	SPA; 1; 3	SPA; 2; 5	JER; 1; 1	JER; 2; 12	CAT; 1; 11	CAT; 2; 10		8th	98
2026	Griffin Core	LEC; 1; 9	LEC; SR; 2	LEC; 2; 17	POR; 1; 23	POR; 2; 10	IMO; 1; 6	IMO; SR; Ret	IMO; 2 DNS	MNZ; 1; 11	MNZ; 2; 9	SIL; 1; 9	SIL; 2; 9	JER; 1; 3	JER; SR; 8	JER; 2; 10	HUN; 1; 8	HUN; 2; 10	CAT; 1 Ret	CAT; 2 Ret	13th	50

=== Complete GB3 Championship results ===
(key) (Races in bold indicate pole position) (Races in italics indicate fastest lap)

Year	Team	1	2	3	4	5	6	7	8	9	10	11	12	13	14	15	16	17	18	19	20	21	22	23	24	DC	Points
2025	VRD Racing	SIL1; 1; 19	SIL1; 2; 14	SIL1; 3; 12^{7}	ZAN; 1	ZAN; 2	ZAN; 3	SPA; 1	SPA; 2	SPA; 3	HUN; 1	HUN; 2	HUN; 3	SIL2; 1; 8	SIL2; 2; 11	SIL2; 3; 8	BRH; 1; 11	BRH; 2; 14	BRH; 3; 1^{1}	DON; 1; 9	DON; 2; 11	DON; 3; 9	MNZ; 1; 18	MNZ; 2 Ret	MNZ; 3; 19	17th	122
