= Maciej Gładysz =

Polish racing driver (born 2008)

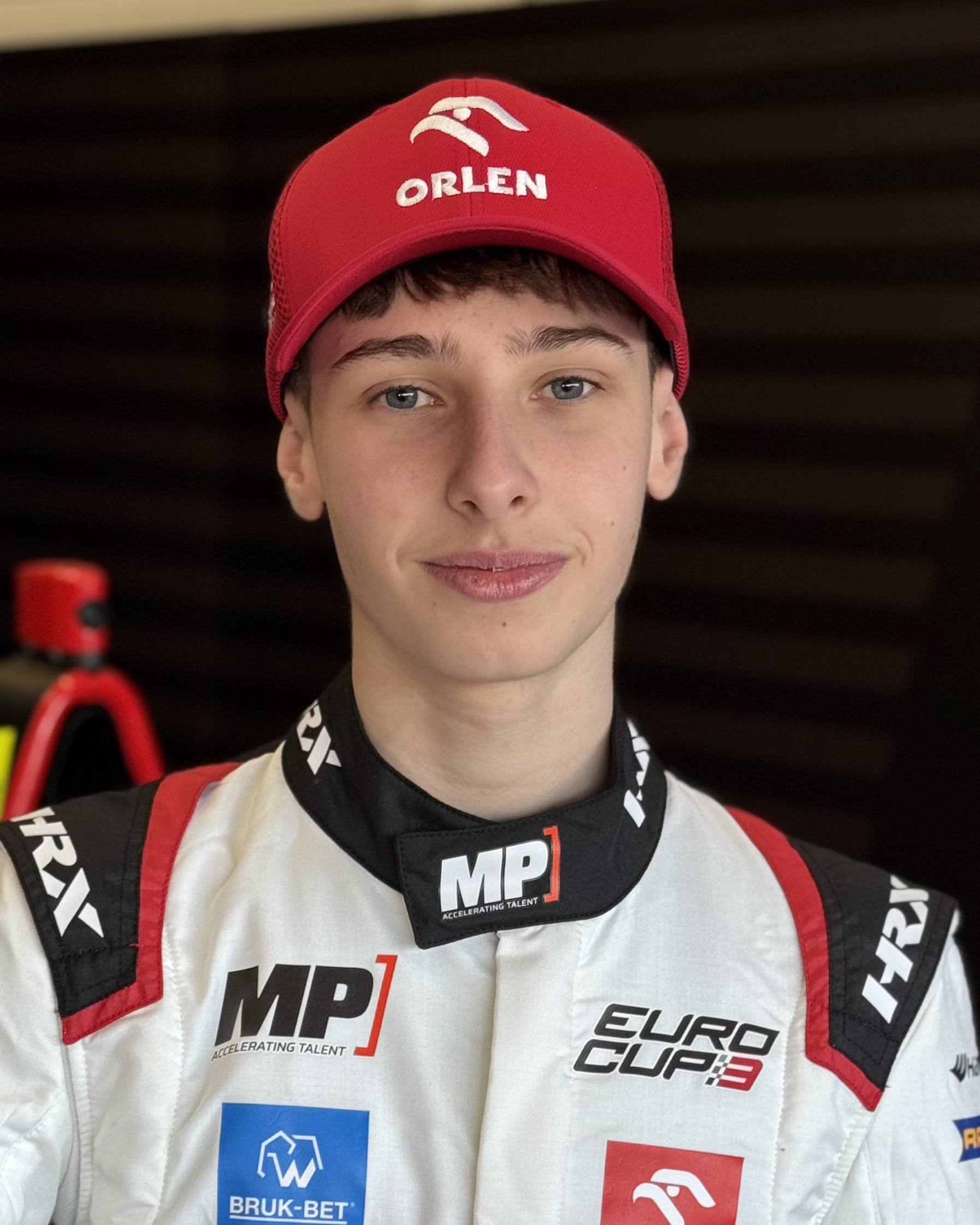
- Gładysz in 2025
- Nationality: (Poland) Polish
- Born: 28 April 2008 (age 18) Tarnów, Poland

FIA Formula 3 Championship career
- Debut season: 2026
- Current team: MP Motorsport
- Car number: TBA
- Former teams: ART Grand Prix
- Starts: 19
- Wins: 1
- Podiums: 1
- Poles: 0
- Fastest laps: 0
- Best finish: 12th in 2026

Previous series
- 2025; 2025; 2024; 2024: Eurocup-3; Eurocup-3 Winter Championship; F4 Spanish Championship; Formula Winter Series

Championship titles
- 2025: Eurocup-3 Winter Championship
- Statistics up to date as of 19 October 2026.

Maciej Gładysz (born 28 April 2008) is a Polish racing driver who is set to compete in FIA Formula 3 for MP Motorsport.

Born in Tarnów, Gładysz began his single-seater career in Spanish F4 in 2024 with MP Motorsport, finishing third overall in the standings. He then moved up to Eurocup-3 for 2025 and won a race, after winning the winter series.

== Career ==
=== Karting ===
Gładysz began karting on the European stage in 2018, where he recorded a best finish of 20th in the WSK Final Cup in the Mini category. In 2019, Gładysz finished 6th in both the WSK Super Master Series and the ROK Cup Superfinal in the same category.

Gładysz had a strong year in 2020 in his final year of Mini karting, finishing third in three separate championships and ending the season with a first place in the WSK Open Cup. Gładysz stepped up to OKJ the following season, and also contested the Karting Academy Trophy, finishing first. He continued in OKJ for 2022, winning the Champions of the Future Winter Series and finishing second in the WSK Euro Series. Gładysz competed in OK for his final year in karts.

=== Formula 4 ===
==== 2023 ====
In late 2023, Gładysz attended the Ferrari Driver Academy scout camp organised by the ACI.

==== 2024 ====
In the 2024 pre-season, Gładysz joined the Formula Winter Series in preparation for his main campaign. Gładysz impressed, finishing on the podium twice in the first round at Jerez. He ended the season in third, scoring 92 points and finishing on the podium three times over the course of the season, and winning the rookie title.

For his main campaign, it was announced that Gładysz would join MP Motorsport to race in the F4 Spanish Championship. Gładysz had a slow start to the Spanish F4 season, but took his first single-seater win after taking a pole position and a subsequent victory at the Circuit Paul Ricard. He would followed this with two successive victories in Aragón. Gładysz would not win anymore after that, but did rack up three more podiums and eventually finished third in the standings with 187 points, having amassed three victories and eight podiums throughout the season.

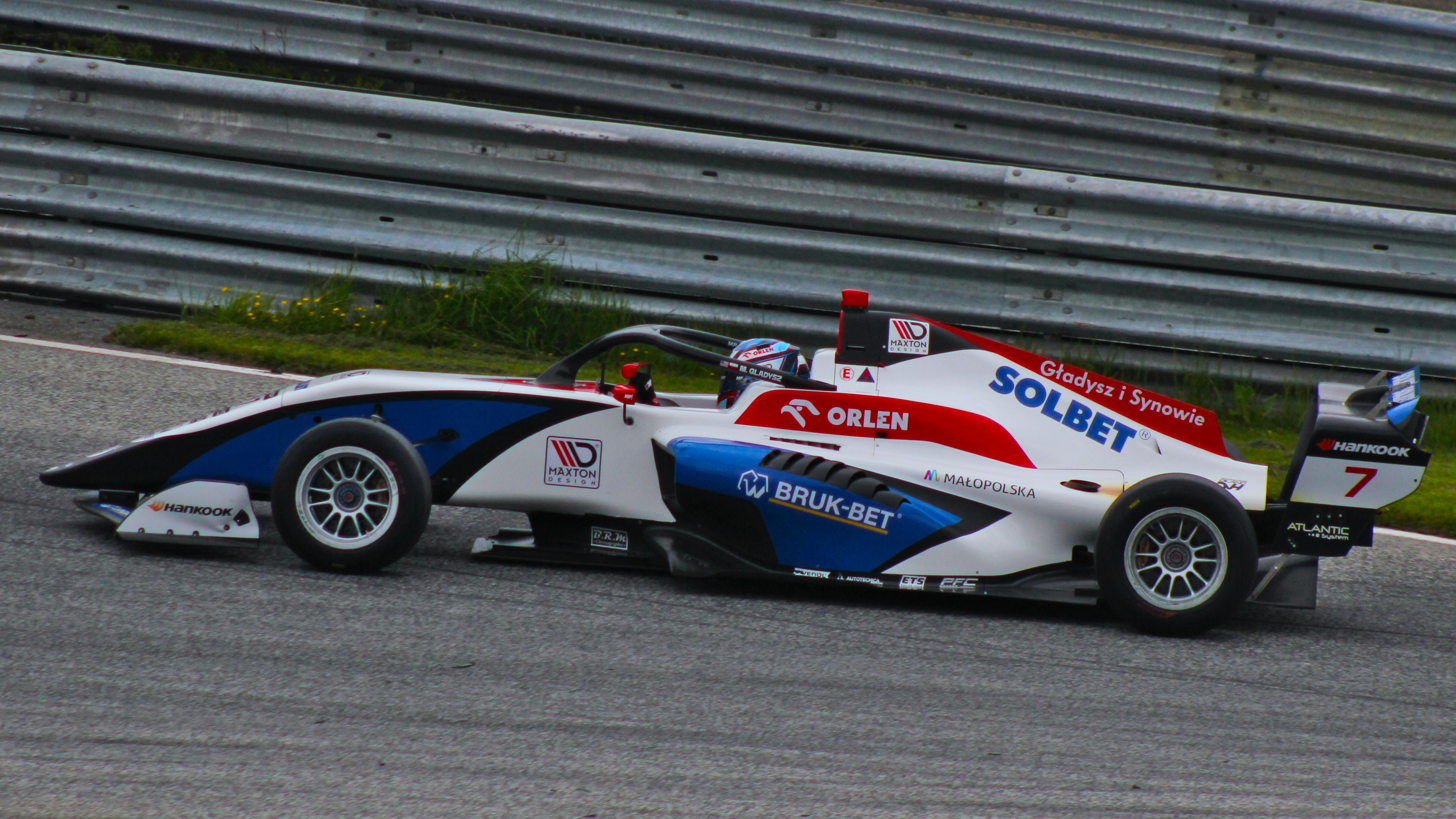
Gładysz driving at the Red Bull Ring during the 2025 Eurocup-3 season

=== Eurocup-3 ===
In 2025, Gładysz stepped up to Eurocup-3, continuing his partnership with MP Motorsport. He also drove for the team in the Eurocup-3 Spanish Winter Championship. Before the final race at MotorLand Aragón, he was level on points with championship leader Mattia Colnaghi, who was ahead on countback by have a seventh-place finish compared to Gładysz's ninth.

=== FIA Formula 3 ===
==== 2026 ====
Gładysz moved up to Formula 3 with ART Grand Prix in 2026.

==== 2027 ====
Gładysz will return to MP Motorsport in 2027 for his second season in the category.

=== Formula One ===
Gładysz was part of the Sauber Karting Team in 2021.

== Karting record ==
=== Karting career summary ===
Season	Series	Team	Position
2015	Rotax Max Challenge Poland - Micro Max	Auto-Moto-Klub Tarnowski	28th
2016	Polish Championship - Micro Max	Gładysz Karting Team	7th
2016	Rotax Max Challenge Poland - Micro Max	Gładysz Karting Team	8th
2016	Hungarian International Open - Micro Max	Gładysz Karting Team	22nd
2016	Polish Youth Championship - Micro Max	Auto-Moto-Klub Tarnowski	10th
2017	Polish Youth Championship - Micro Max	TTSK K-TEAM Tarnów	1st
2017	Rotax Max Challenge Poland - Micro Max	Gładysz Karting Team	1st
2017	Rotax Max Challenge Grand Finals - Micro Max	Gładysz Karting Team	30th
2017	Hungarian International Open - Micro Max	Gładysz Karting Team	21st
2017	Trofeo Invernal Ayrton Senna - 60 Mini		28th
2018	WSK Champions Cup - 60 Mini	Parolin Poland	25th
2018	WSK Super Master Series - 60 Mini	Parolin Poland	34th
2018	South Garda Winter Cup - Mini Rok	Parolin Poland	NC
2018	WSK Final Cup - 60 Mini	Parolin Poland	20th
2018	Polish Youth Championship - Mini ROK	Parolin Poland	2nd
2018	ROK Cup Poland - Mini ROK	Parolin Poland	3rd
2019	WSK Champions Cup - 60 Mini	Parolin Poland	NC
2019	WSK Super Master Series - 60 Mini	Parolin Poland	6th
2019	South Garda Winter Cup - Mini Rok	Parolin Poland	18th
2019	ROK Cup Superfinal - Mini Rok	Parolin Poland	6th
2019	WSK Open Cup - 60 Mini	Parolin Poland	12th
2019	WSK Final Cup - 60 Mini	Parolin Poland	16th
2019	ROK Cup Poland - Mini ROK	Parolin Poland	1st
2019	Polish Youth Championship - Mini ROK	TTSK K-TEAM Tarnów	1st
2020	WSK Champions Cup - 60 Mini	Parolin Racing Kart	6th
2020	WSK Super Master Series - 60 Mini	Parolin Racing Kart	3rd
2020	Champions of the Future - 60 Mini	Parolin Racing Kart	6th
2020	Andrea Margutti Trophy - 60 Mini	Parolin Racing Kart	3rd
2020	WSK Open Cup - 60 Mini	Parolin Racing Kart	1st
2020	South Garda Winter Cup - Mini Rok	Parolin Poland	4th
2020	ROK Cup Superfinal - Mini Rok	Parolin Poland	3rd
2021	WSK Champions Cup - OKJ	Sauber Academy	33rd
2021	WSK Super Master Series - OKJ	Sauber Academy	84th
2021	WSK Euro Series - OKJ	Sauber Academy	39th
2021	Champions of the Future - OKJ	Sauber Academy	48th
2021	CIK-FIA European Championship - OKJ	Sauber Academy	33rd
2021	CIK-FIA Academy Trophy		1st
2021	WSK Open Cup - OKJ	Forza Racing	12th
2021	CIK-FIA World Championship - OKJ	Forza Racing	NC
2021	South Garda Winter Cup - OKJ	Forza Racing	NC
2021	WSK Final Cup - OKJ	Forza Racing	34th
2022	WSK Super Master Series - OKJ	Ricky Flynn Motorsport	9th
2022	Champions of the Future Winter Series - OKJ	Ricky Flynn Motorsport	1st
2022	Champions of the Future - OKJ	Ricky Flynn Motorsport	13th
2022	CIK-FIA European Championship - OKJ	Ricky Flynn Motorsport	15th
2022	WSK Euro Series - OKJ	Ricky Flynn Motorsport	2nd
2022	CIK-FIA World Championship - OKJ	Ricky Flynn Motorsport	4th
2022	WSK Open Cup - OKJ	Ricky Flynn Motorsport	4th
2022	Italian ACI Championship - OKJ		4th
2023	WSK Super Master Series - OK	Ricky Flynn Motorsport	24th
2023	Champions of the Future - OK	Ricky Flynn Motorsport	43rd
2023	CIK-FIA European Championship - OK	Ricky Flynn Motorsport	20th

== Racing record ==
=== Racing career summary ===
Season	Series	Team	Races	Wins	Poles	F/Laps	Podiums	Points	Position
2024	Formula Winter Series	MP Motorsport	11	0	0	0	3	92	**3rd**
2024	F4 Spanish Championship	KCL by MP Motorsport	21	3	3	1	8	187	**3rd**
2025	Eurocup-3 Spanish Winter Championship	KCL by MP Motorsport	8	2	2	1	5	115	**1st**
2025	Eurocup-3	KCL by MP Motorsport	18	1	0	0	1	88	10th
2026	FIA Formula 3 Championship	ART Grand Prix	19	1	0	0	1	54	12th
2027	FIA Formula 3 Championship	MP Motorsport	0	0	0	0	0	0	TBD

^{*} Season still in progress.

=== Complete Formula Winter Series results ===
(key) (Races in bold indicate pole position; races in italics indicate fastest lap)

Year	Team	1	2	3	4	5	6	7	8	9	10	11	12	DC	Points
2024	MP Motorsport	JER; 1; 3	JER; 2; 2	JER; 3; 5	CRT; 1; 4	CRT; 2; 3	CRT; 3; 31	ARA; 1 Ret	ARA; 2; 8	ARA; 3; 7	CAT; 1 C	CAT; 2; 4	CAT; 3; 12	3rd	92

=== Complete F4 Spanish Championship results ===
(key) (Races in bold indicate pole position; races in italics indicate fastest lap)

Year	Team	1	2	3	4	5	6	7	8	9	10	11	12	13	14	15	16	17	18	19	20	21	DC	Points
2024	KCL by MP Motorsport	JAR; 1; 5	JAR; 2; 2	JAR; 3; 12	POR; 1; 12	POR; 2; 20	POR; 3; 7	LEC; 1; 4	LEC; 2; 3	**LEC**; **3**; 1	**ARA**; **1**; 1	**ARA**; **2**; 1	ARA; 3; 25	CRT; 1 Ret	CRT; 2; 3	CRT; 3; 15	JER; 1; 3	JER; 2; 2	JER; 3; 5	CAT; 1; 10	CAT; 2; 15	CAT; 3; 7	3rd	187

=== Complete Eurocup-3 Spanish Winter Championship results ===
(key) (Races in bold indicate pole position) (Races in italics indicate fastest lap)

Year	Team	1	2	3	4	5	6	7	8	DC	Points
2025	KCL by MP Motorsport	JER; 1; 3	JER; 2; 9	**JER**; **3**; 1	POR; 1; 2	POR; 2; 5	POR; 3; 26†	**ARA**; **1**; 1	ARA; 2; 2	1st	115

=== Complete Eurocup-3 results ===
(key) (Races in bold indicate pole position) (Races in italics indicate fastest lap)

Year	Team	1	2	3	4	5	6	7	8	9	10	11	12	13	14	15	16	17	18	DC	Points
2025	MP Motorsport	RBR; 1; 13	RBR; 2; 1	POR; 1; 7	POR; SR; 23	POR; 2; 6	LEC; 1; 7	LEC; SR; 16	LEC; 2; 6	MNZ; 1; 4	MNZ; 2; 25	ASS; 1; 9	ASS; 2; 5	SPA; 1; 8	SPA; 2 Ret	JER; 1; 16	JER; 2; 7	CAT; 1; 12	CAT; 2; 22	10th	88

=== Complete FIA Formula 3 Championship results ===
(key) (Races in bold indicate pole position) (Races in italics indicate fastest lap)

Year	Entrant	1	2	3	4	5	6	7	8	9	10	11	12	13	14	15	16	17	18	19	20	DC	Points
2026	ART Grand Prix	MEL; SPR; 6	MEL; FEA; 5	MON; SPR; 8	MON; FEA; 24	CAT; SPR; 23	CAT; FEA; 10	RBR; SPR; 13	RBR; FEA; Ret	SIL; SPR; 6	SIL; FEA; 1	SPA; SPR; 12	SPA; FEA; 5	HUN; SPR; Ret	HUN; FEA; Ret	MNZ; SPR; Ret	MNZ; FEA; 18	MAD; SPR; 19	MAD; FEA1; Ret	MAD; FEA2; 22		12th	54
2027	MP Motorsport	BHR; SPR	BHR; FEA	JED; SPR	JED; FEA	MEL; SPR	MEL; FEA	MTL; SPR	MTL; FEA	MON; SPR	MON; FEA	SIL; SPR	SIL; FEA	RBR; SPR	RBR; FEA	MNZ; SPR	MNZ; FEA	MAD; SPR	MAD; FEA	IST; SPR	IST; FEA	TBD	TBD
