= 2025 Eurocup-3 season =

2025 formula racing championship

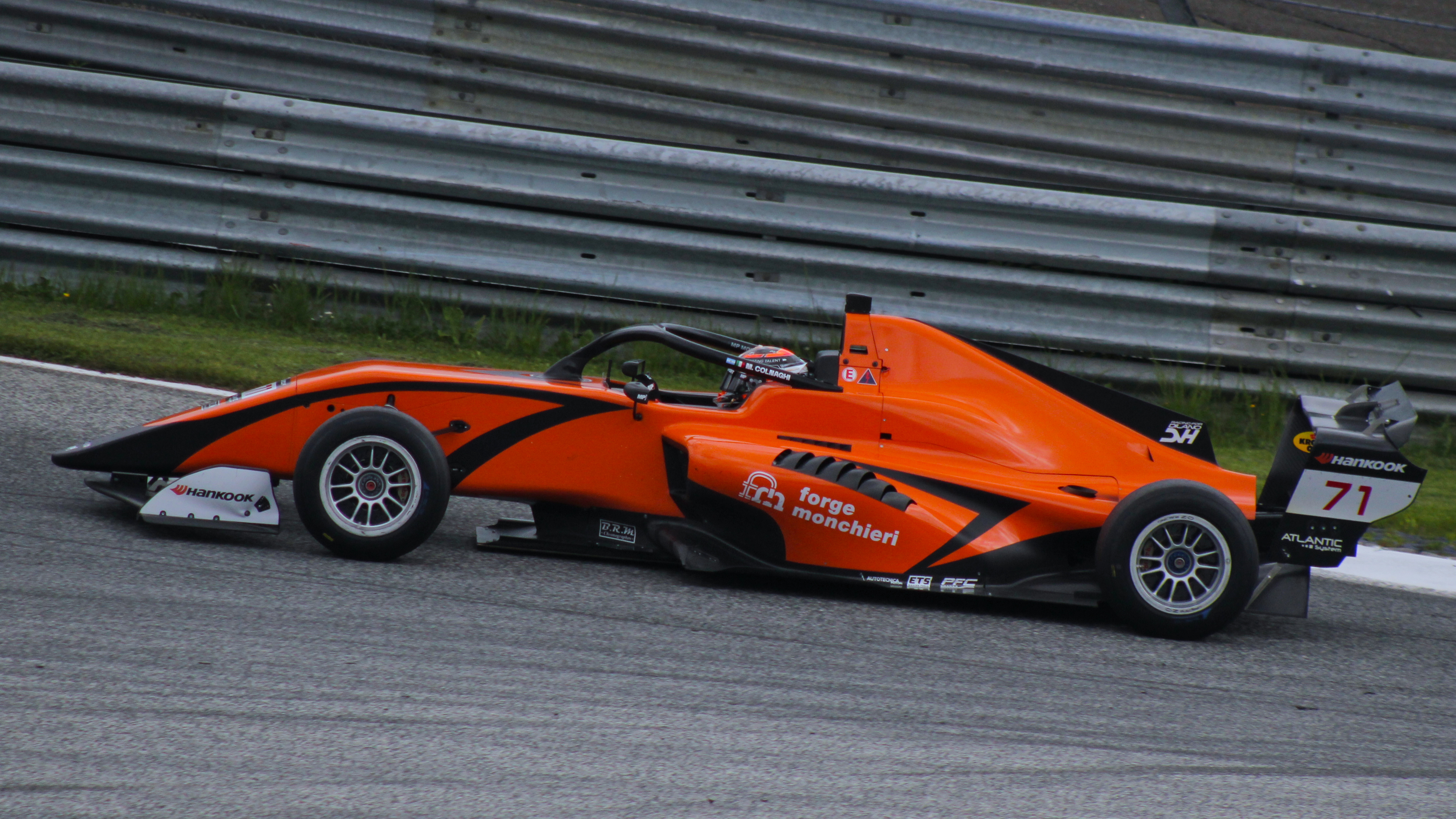
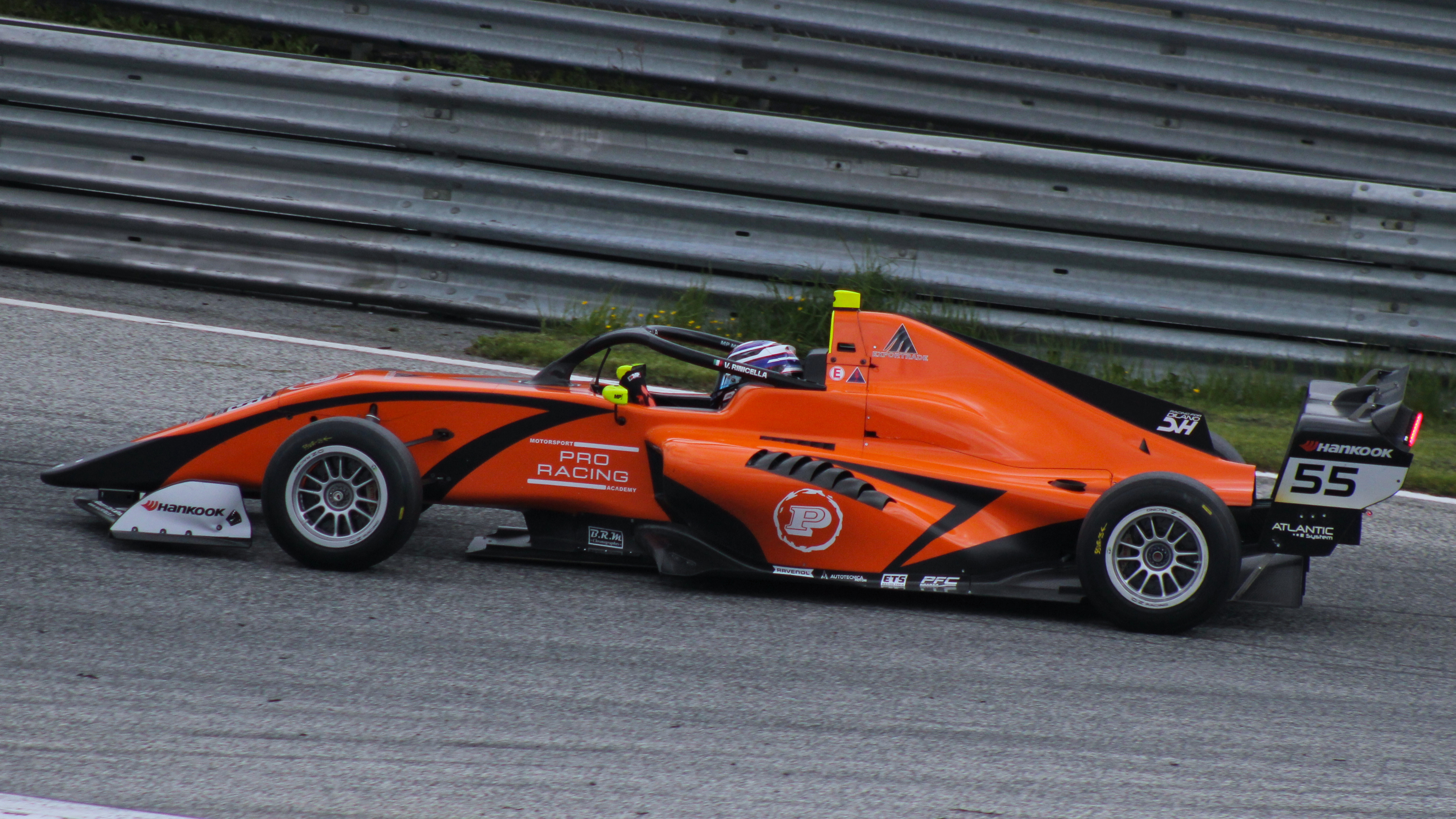
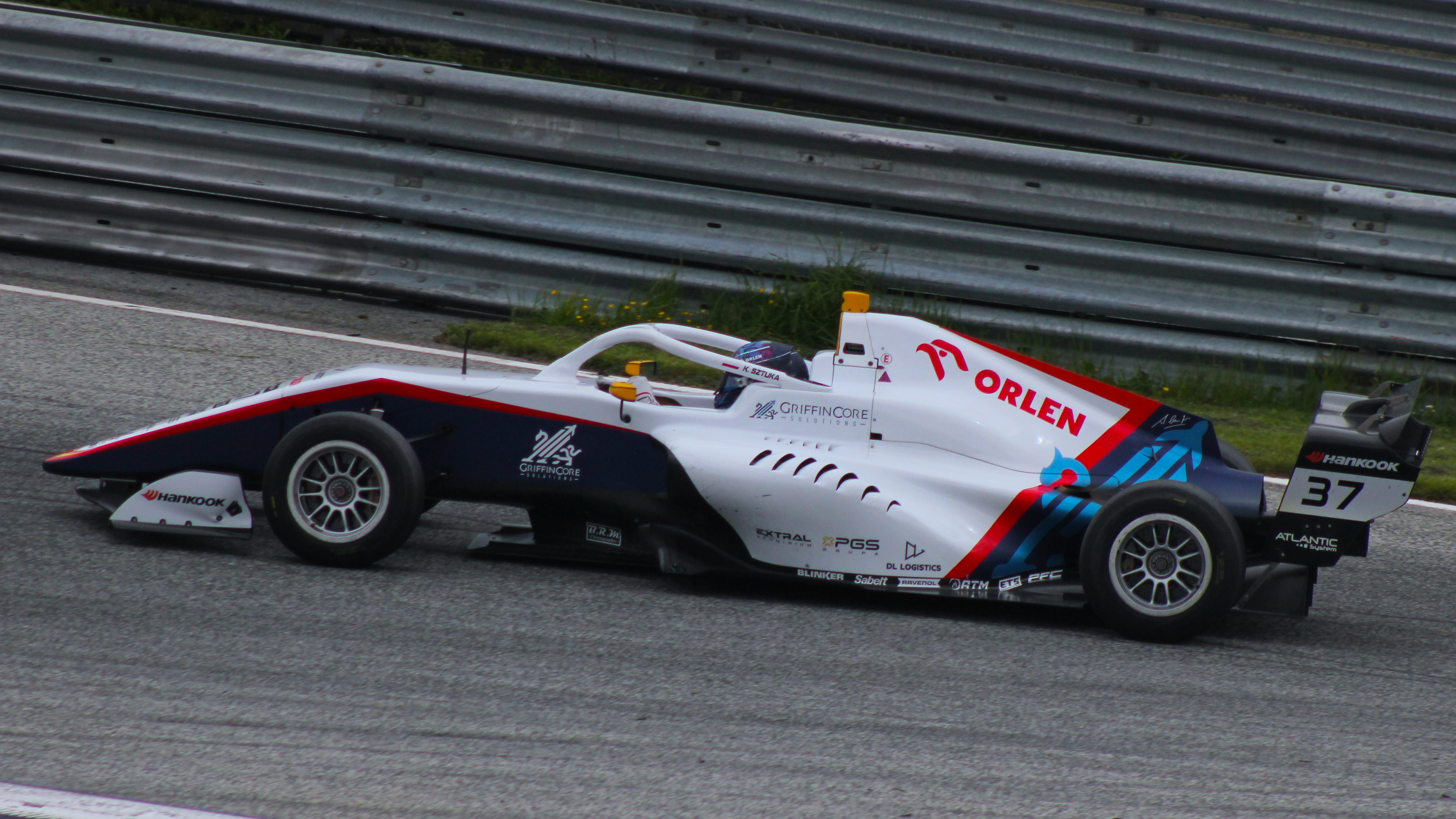
MP Motorsport driver Mattia Colnaghi (top) won both the Drivers' and the Rookies' Championship title, while his team won the Teams' Championship title. His teammate Valerio Rinicella (middle) came second and Kacper Sztuka (bottom) came third driving for Campos Racing's Griffin Core satellite team.

The 2025 Eurocup-3 season was the third season of the Eurocup-3 series. Eurocup-3 is a multi-event motor racing championship for single-seater open wheel formula racing cars held across Europe, created in 2023 as an alternative to the FIA-sanctioned Formula Regional European Championship and the Euroformula Open championship.

Following an inaugural non-championship round in March 2024, the Eurocup-3 and Spanish F4 organisers announced the creation of a new Spanish Winter Championship for each series, held across the Iberian Peninsula in the early months of 2025.

MP Motorsport's Mattia Colnaghi won the Drivers' Championship with two races to spare, and in doing so also secured the Rookies' Championship title and helped his team defend the Teams' Championship title at the same race.

== Main series ==
=== Teams and drivers ===
Teams utilized the same Tatuus F3 T-318 chassis used in the Formula Regional European Championship, but fitted with a different body kit, and new intercoolers and a battery kits, as well as being 25 kg lighter. The car used a 270 hp Alfa Romeo-Autotecnica engine and Hankook tires.

Team	No.	Driver	Status	Rounds
(Spain) / Campos Racing (Note: Cars No. 8, No. 24 and No. 83 entered as Campos Racing, cars No. 2, No. 27 and No. 37 entered as Griffin Core by Campos.); (Spain) / Griffin Core by Campos	2	(Portugal) Francisco Macedo	**R**	All
(Spain) / Campos Racing; (Spain) / Griffin Core by Campos	8	(Thailand) Enzo Tarnvanichkul	**R**	All
(Spain) / Campos Racing; (Spain) / Griffin Core by Campos	24	(Mexico) Ernesto Rivera	**R**	All
(Spain) / Campos Racing; (Spain) / Griffin Core by Campos	27	(Mexico) Jesse Carrasquedo Jr.		All
(Spain) / Campos Racing; (Spain) / Griffin Core by Campos	37	(Poland) Kacper Sztuka		All
(Spain) / Campos Racing; (Spain) / Griffin Core by Campos	83	(France) Jules Caranta	**R**	All
(Spain) / Palou Motorsport (Note: Cars No. 5, No. 6, No. 26, and No. 48 entered as Palou Motorsport, cars No. 3 and No. 23 entered as Sparco Palou MS.); (Spain) / Sparco Palou MS	3	(Germany) Lenny Ried	**R**	All
(Spain) / Palou Motorsport; (Spain) / Sparco Palou MS	5	(France) Luciano Morano		All
(Spain) / Palou Motorsport; (Spain) / Sparco Palou MS	5	(Brazil) Heitor Dall'Agnol	**R** **G**	7 (Note: Dall'Agnol was originally entered in round seven in place of Morano, but withdrew ahead of the round and Morano competed.)
(Spain) / Palou Motorsport; (Spain) / Sparco Palou MS	6	(New Zealand) Zack Scoular	**R**	All
(Spain) / Palou Motorsport; (Spain) / Sparco Palou MS	23	(Brazil) Alceu Feldmann Neto	**R**	All
(Spain) / Palou Motorsport; (Spain) / Sparco Palou MS	26	(United Kingdom) Isaac Barashi		All
(Spain) / Palou Motorsport; (Spain) / Sparco Palou MS	48	(United States) James Egozi	**R**	1–7
(Spain) / Drivex (Note: Cars No. 4, No. 11 and No. 25 entered as Drivex, car No. 17 entered round 3 as DXR and the other rounds as Drivex, car No. 21 entered round 8 as DXR and the other rounds as Drivex.); (Spain) / DXR	4	(Venezuela) Alessandro Famularo		1–5
(Spain) / Drivex; (Spain) / DXR	4	(Lebanon) Christopher El Feghali	**R**	6
(Spain) / Drivex; (Spain) / DXR	11	(Austria) Oscar Wurz	**R**	1–7
(Spain) / Drivex; (Spain) / DXR	11	(Kyrgyzstan) Michael Belov (Note: Belov and Popov are Russian, but compete under Kyrgyz and Italian licences, respectively, as Russian national emblems were banned by the FIA following the Russian invasion of Ukraine.)		8
(Spain) / Drivex; (Spain) / DXR	17	(Spain) Edu Robinson	**R**	2
(Spain) / Drivex; (Spain) / DXR	17	(Vietnam) Owen Tangavelou		3
(Spain) / Drivex; (Spain) / DXR	17	(Spain) Lucas Fluxá	**R**	5
(Spain) / Drivex; (Spain) / DXR	17	(Mexico) Alan Orzynski	**R** **G**	7
(Spain) / Drivex; (Spain) / DXR	17	(Hungary) Ádám Hideg	**G**	8
(Spain) / Drivex; (Spain) / DXR	17	(Poland) Wiktor Dobrzański	**R**	4, 6
(Spain) / Drivex; (Spain) / DXR	21	(Poland) Wiktor Dobrzański	**R**	1
(Spain) / Drivex; (Spain) / DXR	21	(Mexico) Cristian Cantú	**R**	2–4
(Spain) / Drivex; (Spain) / DXR	21	(Brazil) Filippo Fiorentino	**R**	5–6
(Spain) / Drivex; (Spain) / DXR	21	(Brazil) Ricardo Baptista	**R** **G**	8
(Spain) / Drivex; (Spain) / DXR	25	(United States) Preston Lambert	**R**	1–5
(Spain) / Drivex; (Spain) / DXR	25	(Mexico) Jorge Garciarce		6–8
(Netherlands) / MP Motorsport (Note: Cars No. 7, No. 33, No. 55, No. 71 and No. 77 entered as MP Motorsport, cars No. 12 and No. 87 entered as KCL by MP.); (Netherlands) / KCL by MP	7	(Poland) Maciej Gładysz	**R**	All
(Netherlands) / MP Motorsport; (Netherlands) / KCL by MP	12	(Kazakhstan) Alexander Abkhazava		All
(Netherlands) / MP Motorsport; (Netherlands) / KCL by MP	33	(Peru) Andrés Cárdenas	**R**	All
(Netherlands) / MP Motorsport; (Netherlands) / KCL by MP	55	(Italy) Valerio Rinicella		All
(Netherlands) / MP Motorsport; (Netherlands) / KCL by MP	71	(Italy) Mattia Colnaghi	**R**	1–7
(Netherlands) / MP Motorsport; (Netherlands) / KCL by MP	71	(Angola) Lorenzo Campos	**R** **G**	8
(Netherlands) / MP Motorsport; (Netherlands) / KCL by MP	77	(Brazil) Emerson Fittipaldi Jr.		All
(Netherlands) / MP Motorsport; (Netherlands) / KCL by MP	87	(Spain) Juan Cota	**R**	1, 4
(Netherlands) / MP Motorsport; (Netherlands) / KCL by MP	87	(United Kingdom) Kai Daryanani		2–3, 5–8
(France) Saintéloc Racing	10	(Mexico) Lorenzo Castillo	**R**	All
(France) Saintéloc Racing	18	(United Kingdom) Garrett Berry (Note: Berry is an American driver competing under a British licence.)		All
(France) Saintéloc Racing	19	(Denmark) Theodor Jensen		2
(Spain) Tecnicar by Amtog	22	(Israel) Ariel Elkin	**G**	7–8
(Spain) Tecnicar by Amtog	28	(Spain) Daniel Maciá	**R** **G**	8
(Sweden) Allay Racing	41	(Vietnam) Owen Tangavelou		4
(Sweden) Allay Racing	41	(Kyrgyzstan) Michael Belov		5
(Sweden) Allay Racing	43	(Sweden) Linus Hellberg	**R**	1–7
(Sweden) Allay Racing	46	(Sweden) Emil Hellberg	**R**	1–7
(Spain) GRS Team	73	(Italy) Maximilian Popov	**R** **G**	8
(Spain) GRS Team	74	(Belgium) Yani Stevenheydens	**R**	1–3, 8

Icon	Legend
**R**	Rookie
**G**	Guest driver

- Juan Cota was scheduled to compete for Drivex, but later switched to MP Motorsport for a dual Spanish F4 and Eurocup-3 programme.
- Victoria Blokhina was scheduled to return to Drivex for her second Eurocup-3 campaign, but did not enter any rounds.

=== Race calendar ===
The calendar for the 2025 season was announced on 18 November 2024. The race tally was originally scheduled to remain the same, at 16 races across eight tracks. With a separate winter championship also taking place in 2025, the one-off non-championship round was not repeated. Monza Circuit returned to the calendar after a one-year absence, while the series also debuted at TT Circuit Assen. Circuit Zandvoort and MotorLand Aragón left the schedule. Ahead of the second round of the season, it was announced that the rounds at Algarve International Circuit and Circuit Paul Ricard would feature a sprint race, meaning they would feature the same weekend format used during the winter champioship. This brought up the total amount of races to 18.

Round		Circuit	Date	Support bill	Map of circuit locations
1	R1	(Austria) Red Bull Ring, Spielberg	17 May	ESET Cup Series; Formula 4 CEZ Championship	2025 Eurocup-3 season is located in Europe
1	R2	(Austria) Red Bull Ring, Spielberg	18 May	ESET Cup Series; Formula 4 CEZ Championship	2025 Eurocup-3 season is located in Europe
2	R1	(Portugal) Algarve International Circuit, Portimão	7 June	F4 Spanish Championship; Campeonato de España de GT	2025 Eurocup-3 season is located in Europe
2	SR	(Portugal) Algarve International Circuit, Portimão	7 June	F4 Spanish Championship; Campeonato de España de GT	2025 Eurocup-3 season is located in Europe
2	R2	(Portugal) Algarve International Circuit, Portimão	8 June	F4 Spanish Championship; Campeonato de España de GT	2025 Eurocup-3 season is located in Europe
3	R1	(France) Circuit Paul Ricard, Le Castellet	21 June	F4 Spanish Championship; Challenge Endurance VHC V de V	2025 Eurocup-3 season is located in Europe
3	SR	(France) Circuit Paul Ricard, Le Castellet	21 June	F4 Spanish Championship; Challenge Endurance VHC V de V	2025 Eurocup-3 season is located in Europe
3	R2	(France) Circuit Paul Ricard, Le Castellet	22 June	F4 Spanish Championship; Challenge Endurance VHC V de V	2025 Eurocup-3 season is located in Europe
4	R1	(Italy) Monza Circuit, Monza	5 July	BOSS GP; GT4 Italy	2025 Eurocup-3 season is located in Europe
4	R2	(Italy) Monza Circuit, Monza	6 July	BOSS GP; GT4 Italy	2025 Eurocup-3 season is located in Europe
5	R1	(Netherlands) TT Circuit Assen, Assen	9 August	JACK'S Racing Day; Supercar Challenge	2025 Eurocup-3 season is located in Europe
5	R2	(Netherlands) TT Circuit Assen, Assen	10 August	JACK'S Racing Day; Supercar Challenge	2025 Eurocup-3 season is located in Europe
6	R1	(Belgium) Circuit de Spa-Francorchamps, Stavelot	5 September	Michelin 992 Endurance Cup; Porsche Club Historic Challenge	2025 Eurocup-3 season is located in Europe
6	R2	(Belgium) Circuit de Spa-Francorchamps, Stavelot	5 September	Michelin 992 Endurance Cup; Porsche Club Historic Challenge	2025 Eurocup-3 season is located in Europe
7	R1	(Spain) Circuito de Jerez, Jerez de la Frontera	20 September	F4 Spanish Championship; Campeonato de España de GT; TCR Spain Touring Car Championship	2025 Eurocup-3 season is located in Europe
7	R2	(Spain) Circuito de Jerez, Jerez de la Frontera	21 September	F4 Spanish Championship; Campeonato de España de GT; TCR Spain Touring Car Championship	2025 Eurocup-3 season is located in Europe
8	R1	(Spain) Circuit de Barcelona-Catalunya, Montmeló	15 November	F4 Spanish Championship; Campeonato de España de GT; TCR Spain Touring Car Championship	2025 Eurocup-3 season is located in Europe
8	R2	(Spain) Circuit de Barcelona-Catalunya, Montmeló	16 November	F4 Spanish Championship; Campeonato de España de GT; TCR Spain Touring Car Championship	2025 Eurocup-3 season is located in Europe

=== Race results ===
Round		Circuit	Pole position	Fastest lap	Winning driver	Winning team	Rookie winner
1	R1	(Austria) Red Bull Ring	(Italy) Mattia Colnaghi	(Italy) Mattia Colnaghi	(Italy) Mattia Colnaghi	(Netherlands) MP Motorsport	(Italy) Mattia Colnaghi
1	R2	(Austria) Red Bull Ring	(France) Jules Caranta	(Italy) Mattia Colnaghi	(Poland) Maciej Gładysz	(Netherlands) MP Motorsport	(Poland) Maciej Gładysz
2	R1	(Portugal) Algarve International Circuit	(Poland) Kacper Sztuka	(Mexico) Jesse Carrasquedo Jr.	(Mexico) Jesse Carrasquedo Jr.	(Spain) Griffin Core by Campos	(Mexico) Ernesto Rivera
2	SR	(Portugal) Algarve International Circuit		(Poland) Kacper Sztuka	(United States) James Egozi	(Spain) Palou Motorsport	(United States) James Egozi
2	R2	(Portugal) Algarve International Circuit	(Mexico) Jesse Carrasquedo Jr. (Note: Carrasquedo qualified on pole position and was awarded with the two pole position points, but was demoted to sixth position due to a grid penalty. Ernesto Rivera started on first for the race.)	(Mexico) Jesse Carrasquedo Jr.	(Mexico) Ernesto Rivera	(Spain) Campos Racing	(Mexico) Ernesto Rivera
3	R1	(France) Circuit Paul Ricard	(Mexico) Ernesto Rivera	(Mexico) Ernesto Rivera	(Italy) Mattia Colnaghi	(Netherlands) MP Motorsport	(Italy) Mattia Colnaghi
3	SR	(France) Circuit Paul Ricard		(Italy) Mattia Colnaghi	(United Kingdom) Garrett Berry	(France) Saintéloc Racing	(Portugal) Francisco Macedo
3	R2	(France) Circuit Paul Ricard	(Poland) Kacper Sztuka	(Portugal) Francisco Macedo	(Poland) Kacper Sztuka	(Spain) Griffin Core by Campos	(Mexico) Ernesto Rivera
4	R1	(Italy) Monza Circuit	(Mexico) Ernesto Rivera	(United States) James Egozi	(Mexico) Ernesto Rivera	(Spain) Campos Racing	(Mexico) Ernesto Rivera
4	R2	(Italy) Monza Circuit	(France) Jules Caranta	(Italy) Valerio Rinicella	(Italy) Mattia Colnaghi	(Netherlands) MP Motorsport	(Italy) Mattia Colnaghi
5	R1	(Netherlands) TT Circuit Assen	(Italy) Mattia Colnaghi	(Italy) Valerio Rinicella	(Italy) Valerio Rinicella (Note: Colnaghi crossed the line in first place, but received a ten-second time penalty for incorrectly positioning his car at the start. Rinicella inherited first place.)	(Netherlands) MP Motorsport	(Italy) Mattia Colnaghi
5	R2	(Netherlands) TT Circuit Assen	(Italy) Mattia Colnaghi	(Italy) Mattia Colnaghi	(Italy) Mattia Colnaghi	(Netherlands) MP Motorsport	(Italy) Mattia Colnaghi
6	R1	(Belgium) Circuit de Spa-Francorchamps	(Mexico) Jesse Carrasquedo Jr.	(Mexico) Jesse Carrasquedo Jr.	(Mexico) Jesse Carrasquedo Jr.	(Spain) Griffin Core by Campos	(Italy) Mattia Colnaghi
6	R2	(Belgium) Circuit de Spa-Francorchamps	(Brazil) Emerson Fittipaldi Jr.	(Poland) Kacper Sztuka	(Mexico) Ernesto Rivera	(Spain) Campos Racing	(Mexico) Ernesto Rivera
7	R1	(Spain) Circuito de Jerez	(Thailand) Enzo Tarnvanichkul (Note: Sztuka qualified on pole position and was awarded with the two pole position points, but was demoted to sixth position due to a grid penalty. Enzo Tarnvanichkul started on first for the race.)	(Italy) Mattia Colnaghi	(Thailand) Enzo Tarnvanichkul	(Spain) Campos Racing	(Thailand) Enzo Tarnvanichkul
7	R2	(Spain) Circuito de Jerez	(Italy) Mattia Colnaghi	(Poland) Kacper Sztuka	(Italy) Mattia Colnaghi	(Netherlands) MP Motorsport	(Italy) Mattia Colnaghi
8	R1	(Spain) Circuit de Barcelona-Catalunya	(Mexico) Jesse Carrasquedo Jr. (Note: Jesse Carrasquedo Jr. was fastest in qualifying, but a penalty carried over from round 7 saw him start fourth. Sztuka inherited pole position, but Carrasquedo still earned the two bonus points.)	(Poland) Kacper Sztuka	(Poland) Kacper Sztuka	(Spain) Griffin Core by Campos	(Poland) Maciej Gładysz
8	R2	(Spain) Circuit de Barcelona-Catalunya	(Peru) Andrés Cárdenas	(Peru) Andrés Cárdenas	(Peru) Andrés Cárdenas	(Netherlands) MP Motorsport	(Peru) Andrés Cárdenas

=== Season report ===
==== First half ====
Eurocup-3's main season began in May at the Red Bull Ring with MP Motorsport's Mattia Colnaghi claiming pole position for the opening race. Griffin Core's Kacper Sztuka started alongside him, but found no way past the Italian despite pressuring him through the final stages of the race. GRS driver Yani Stevenheydens initially ran third, but Campos Racing's Ernesto Rivera passed him on lap three to claim the final podium spot. Race two pole position went to Campos and Jules Caranta, but a slow start allowed Colnaghi to get alongside him through the opening turns, with both him and his teammate Maciej Gładysz getting past Caranta on the opening lap. The latter then quickly built a gap to take the race win by five seconds as Colnaghi had a similar gap to third-placed Caranta, enjoying a quiet race to leave Spielberg in the lead of the championship.

Round two at the Algarve International Circuit featured three races for the first time in the series' main season history. Sztuka was fastest in the opening qualifying session, leading a Campos top-five lockout, but lost his lead after a first-lap safety car. Leaving it very late for the restart, his teammate Jesse Carrasquedo Jr. and Rivera both got past him before the first green flag corner. Sztuka then dropped further down, before a second safety car late in the race allowed him to retake third place. Palou Motorsport's James Egozi started the sprint race from pole position, leading KCL by MP's Alexander Abkhazava and MP's Valerio Rinicella to take a lights-to-flag victory, untroubled by a mid-race safety car restart. The top four spots in the second qualifying session once again all belonged to Campos-run cars, with Carrasquedo Jr. fastest. A five-place grid penalty for the Mexican saw Rivera start the race in first place instead, and he quickly was able to pull away as Colnaghi, Caranta and Sztuka fought over second behind him all race. Colnaghi won that battle on track, but a post-race penalty demoted him to seventh, giving second to Caranta, promoting Sztuka onto the podium and handing Rivera the championship lead.

Circuit Paul Ricard hosted round three, also featuring a sprint race. Rivera led Colnaghi in the opening qualifying session, but a slow start for the polesitter saw Colnaghi move in front right away as Rivera had to fend off Sztuka behind him. He remained right behind the leader all throughout the race, before attacking with two laps to go. That allowed Sztuka to join the fight. The pair collided, with Rinicella benefitting to take third, before Rivera ran off track at the final corner and fell to fourth behind both of them. Saintéloc Racing’s Garrett Berry had pole position for the sprint race. Egozi attacked Griffin Core's Francisco Macedo for second, before he lost third to MP's Emerson Fittipaldi Jr. and the race was interrupted by a lengthy safety car. Only eight minutes were left when it was withdrawn, and the podium order remained static until the finish. Sztuka inherited pole position for the final race after Carrasquedo Jr. had his fastest qualifying laps deleted. Rinicella beat him to turn one to take the lead as Sztuka fended off Rivera and Colnaghi. Sztuka kept close to the lead to retake it on the final lap, winning the race ahead of Rinicella and Rivera to take a six-point championship lead over Colnaghi in the process.

Round four at Monza Circuit brought an end to the season's first half. Rivera claimed pole position for the first race ahead of Rinicella and Gładysz. The first race began with multiple incidents and crashes, among them Rinicella and Gładysz, who both went off. That saw MP's Andrés Cárdenas move into second ahead of Rinicella, before the safety car then came out. Restarts on laps four and seven were both short-lived, and Rivera pulled away to win at the final restart, taking back the championship lead. Caranta took pole position for race two, but had dropped to third behind Colnaghi and Rinicella by the first turn. He fought back into second, but fell further down the order as the race went on. Up front, Colnaghi defended from Rinicella to take victory and close up to four points behind Rivera, while Campos driver Enzo Tarnvanichkul completed the podium.

==== Second half ====
Eurocup-3's debut at TT Circuit Assen opened up the season's second half. Championship chasers Colnaghi and Rinicella took the top two spots in the first qualifying session. Allay Racing's Michael Belov started third, and the top three all attacked each other in the opening part of the first race, but no positions changed all race. Colnaghi won the race on track, but a ten-second penalty for a starting procedure infringement saw him drop to third. Rinicella inherited the win and took the championship lead as Rivera did not score points. Colnaghi bounced back by taking pole position again for the second race. Belov started second, but mechanical problems saw him retire immediately at the start. That promoted Abkhazava to second as Rinicella moved to third, and the top three remained static afterwards to hand Colnaghi a twelve-point championship lead over Rinicella.

Round six at Circuit de Spa-Francorchamps was up next, where Carrasquedo Jr. and Fittipaldi Jr. shared pole positions for the two races. Carrasquedo Jr. held his lead at the start of race one as Colnaghi moved from fourth to second and Sztuka slotted into third. The Pole soon attacked Colnaghi for second, but could not get past and dropped to fourth behind Tarnvanichkul. Heavy rain then began to fall, with the race soon placed under safety car conditions, before the race was ended early after nine laps. Fittipaldi Jr. failed to convert his race two pole position. He stalled at the start and fell to the back, allowing Colnaghi to lead Rivera, Sztuka and Carrasquedo Jr., will all of them leading spells of the race. In the end, Rivera won ahead of Colnaghi and Carrasquedo Jr., with both Sztuka and Rinicella retiring to hand Colnaghi a sizable 48-point lead in the championship.

The penultimate round of 2025 was held at Circuito de Jerez. Sztuka was fastest in the opening qualifying session, but a grid penalty saw him start sixth as Tarnvanichkul inherited pole position ahead of Caranta and Colnaghi. The Italian tried taking the lead at the start of race one, but was forced to slot back into third as Caranta now tried to move past the race leader. Tarnvanichkul held on to the lead, before the race settled down and he was able to take his maiden win. Colnaghi secured pole position for the second race, ahead of Sztuka and Rinicella, with the two bonus points now meaning he would have to score only two points in the race to seal the championship title. That did not deter him from securing an unchallenged lights-to-flag victory to claim the title in style, with Sztuka coming second and Rivera third after moving past Rinicella at the start of the race.

With his title already wrapped up, Colnaghi opted to skip the final round at Barcelona to compete in the Macau Grand Prix. Carrasquedo Jr. was fastest in qualifying for the first race, but penalties saw Sztuka inherit pole position ahead of Fittipaldi Jr. and Belov. Fittipaldi Jr. had a slow start and dropped out of contention right away, with Belov slotting into second ahead of Gładysz. A lengthy safety car for two separate incidents followed, and Sztuka pulled away at the restart to secure victory. Belov behind retired with a mechanical issue, allowing Rinicella to take second. A post-race penalty for Gładysz then promoted Caranta onto the podium. Cárdenas was on pole for the second race and led throughout two safety car phases to claim his maiden victory. Rinicella in second secured the runner-up spot in the championship, while Carrasquedo Jr. claimed third place.

The opening part of the 2025 Eurocup-3 season was closely fought, with Colnaghi, Sztuka, Rivera and Rinicella all in the fight and each leading the standings during different parts of the campaign. But when Colnaghi won the second race in Monza, he would never step off the podium afterwards, distancing himself from his competitors to claim the title with two races to spare in the end. Colnaghi's season saw him take five victories, two more than any other driver could claim, as well as five further podiums, despite only competing in 16 of the 18 races. He also finished every race he started, and only did so without scoring points on one occasion. With everyone of his competitors retiring at least once, Colnaghi was able to consistently outscore his opposition during the second half of the year to claim the title as a rookie.

=== Championship standings ===
==== Scoring system ====
For races one and two, points were awarded as follows:

Position	**1st**	**2nd**	**3rd**	**4th**	**5th**	**6th**	**7th**	**8th**	**9th**	**10th**	**Pole**	**FL**
Points	25	18	15	12	10	8	6	4	2	1	2	1

In Portimão and Paul Ricard, a shorter sprint race was held, awarding reduced points:

Position	**1st**	**2nd**	**3rd**	**4th**	**5th**	**6th**	**7th**	**8th**	**9th**	**10th**	**FL**
Points	10	9	8	7	6	5	4	3	2	1	1

==== Drivers' standings ====
Pos	Driver	RBR (Austria)		POR (Portugal)			LEC (France)			MNZ (Italy)		ASS (Netherlands)		SPA (Belgium)		JER (Spain)		CAT (Spain)		Pts
Pos	Driver	R1	R2	R1	SR	R2	R1	SR	R2	R1	R2	R1	R2	R1	R2	R1	R2	R1	R2	Pts
1	(Italy) Mattia Colnaghi	**1**	2	21	5	7	1	7	5	6	1	**3**	**1**	2	2	3	**1**			256
2	(Italy) Valerio Rinicella	6	4	5	3	5	2	5	2	3	2	1	3	22	Ret	4	6	2	2	221
3	(Poland) Kacper Sztuka	2	5	**3**	25	3	3	10	**1**	Ret	9	5	4	4	Ret	**14**	2	1	4	200
4	(Mexico) Ernesto Rivera	3	6	2	26	1	**4**	8	3	**1**	5	13	17	11	1	Ret	3	Ret	14	176
5	(Mexico) Jesse Carrasquedo Jr.	11	7	1	6	**28**	5	Ret	4	Ret	6	6	6	**1**	3	7	25	**18**	3	152
6	(France) Jules Caranta	17	**3**	4	22	2	10	18	15	5	**10**	29†	8	5	7	2	8	3	6	126
7	(Peru) Andrés Cárdenas	8	16	8	8	12	8	11	24	2	7	4	11	6	13	Ret	10	5	**1**	98
8	(Thailand) Enzo Tarnvanichkul	9	14	22	9	4	6	6	12	17	3	10	21	3	5	1	12	11	10	98
9	(United States) James Egozi	5	10	6	1	8	16	4	7	8	4	7	7	7	4	9	9			97
10	(Poland) Maciej Gładysz	13	1	7	23	6	7	16	6	4	25	9	5	8	Ret	16	7	12	22	88
11	(Brazil) Emerson Fittipaldi Jr.	15	12	13	10	9	19	3	8	7	11	8	10	23	**10**	6	4	4	8	65
12	(Kazakhstan) Alexander Abkhazava	16	13	Ret	2	16	Ret	22	9	13	12	12	2	17	6	5	18	Ret	7	53
13	(United Kingdom) Garrett Berry	4	8	Ret	7	10	9	1	25	Ret	14	11	12	10	15	10	26	6	13	43
14	(Portugal) Francisco Macedo	20	11	23	4	Ret	12	2	26	16	8	25	9	13	9	13	5	DNS	9	37
15	(Kyrgyzstan) Michael Belov											2	Ret					23†	5	28
16	(Belgium) Yani Stevenheydens	7	9	9	12	13	WD	WD	WD									8	11	16
17	(United Kingdom) Kai Daryanani			10	Ret	17	13	9	DNS			14	18	9	11	8	11	9	15	13
18	(Austria) Oscar Wurz	10	15	17	Ret	11	Ret	12	10	19†	15	15	13	12	8	15	16			6
19	(Spain) Juan Cota	12	18							9	13									2
20	(United Kingdom) Isaac Barashi	Ret	20	24	16	22	18	20	17	10	18	18	19	19	Ret	18	19	Ret	23	1
21	(France) Luciano Morano	14	17	11	11	14	11	15	13	18	21	17	14	18	Ret	11	17	14	20	0
22	(Vietnam) Owen Tangavelou						Ret	13	11	11	Ret									0
23	(Germany) Lenny Ried	23	19	Ret	19	29	Ret	21	16	12	16	19	Ret	15	14	19	23	16	16	0
24	(Lebanon) Christopher El Feghali													14	12					0
25	(Spain) Edu Robinson			12	15	21														0
26	(United States) Preston Lambert	19	21	Ret	13	18	23†	14	14	Ret	20	21	Ret							0
27	(Mexico) Jorge Garciarce													16	16	17	14	13	18	0
28	(Mexico) Cristian Cantú			15	14	23	22	23	20	Ret	DNS									0
29	(Mexico) Lorenzo Castillo	21	22	20	24	19	14	17	Ret	21†	17	22	23	25	17	Ret	15	WD	WD	0
30	(Venezuela) Alessandro Famularo	27	27	14	20	20	17	Ret	18	22†	19	23	16							0
31	(Sweden) Emil Hellberg	24	25	18	Ret	25	20	26	23	14	26	28	20	28	20	22	22			0
32	(Brazil) Alceu Feldmann Neto	26	26	16	18	26	Ret	24	19	Ret	24	27	24	26	19	23	20	15	Ret	0
33	(Spain) Lucas Fluxá											16	15							0
34	(New Zealand) Zack Scoular	18	23	25	17	24	15	19	21	20†	22	26	25	20	Ret	20	21	22	Ret	0
35	(Sweden) Linus Hellberg	25	Ret	19	21	27	21	25	22	15	23	24	22	27	21	21	Ret			0
36	(Denmark) Theodor Jensen			Ret	Ret	15														0
37	(Poland) Wiktor Dobrzański	22	24							Ret	Ret			21	18					0
38	(Brazil) Filippo Fiorentino											20	26†	24	22					0
guest drivers ineligible to score points:
—	(Spain) Daniel Maciá																	7	17	0
—	(Italy) Maximilian Popov																	10	19	0
—	(Israel) Ariel Elkin															12	13	17	12	0
—	(Brazil) Ricardo Baptista																	19	21	0
—	(Hungary) Ádám Hideg																	20	Ret	0
—	(Angola) Lorenzo Campos																	21	Ret	0
—	(Mexico) Alan Orzynski															24	24			0
—	(Brazil) Heitor Dall'Agnol															WD	WD			0
Pos	Driver	R1	R2	R1	SR	R2	R1	SR	R2	R1	R2	R1	R2	R1	R2	R1	R2	R1	R2	Pts
Pos	Driver	RBR (Austria)		POR (Portugal)			LEC (France)			MNZ (Italy)		ASS (Netherlands)		SPA (Belgium)		JER (Spain)		CAT (Spain)		Pts

Colour	Result
Gold	Winner
Silver	Second place
Bronze	Third place
Green	Points classification
Blue	Non-points classification
Blue	Non-classified finish (NC)
Purple	Retired, not classified (Ret)
Red	Did not qualify (DNQ)
Red	Did not pre-qualify (DNPQ)
Black	Disqualified (DSQ)
White	Did not start (DNS)
White	Withdrew (WD)
White	Race cancelled (C)
Blank	Did not practice (DNP)
Blank	Did not arrive (DNA)
Blank	Excluded (EX)

**Bold** – Pole

Italics – Fastest Lap

† — Did not finish, but classified

Rookie

==== Teams' standings ====
Each team counted their two best results per race and the bonus points for fastest laps if applicable.

Pos	Driver	RBR (Austria)		POR (Portugal)			LEC (France)			MNZ (Italy)		ASS (Netherlands)		SPA (Belgium)		JER (Spain)		CAT (Spain)		Pts
Pos	Driver	R1	R2	R1	SR	R2	R1	SR	R2	R1	R2	R1	R2	R1	R2	R1	R2	R1	R2	Pts
1	(Netherlands) MP Motorsport	1	1	5	3	5	1	3	2	2	1	1	1	2	2	3	1	2	1	552
1	(Netherlands) MP Motorsport	6	2	7	5	7	2	5	5	3	2	3	3	6	10	4	4	4	2	552
2	(Spain) Campos Racing	3	3	2	9	1	4	6	3	1	3	10	8	3	1	1	3	3	6	372
2	(Spain) Campos Racing	9	6	4	22	2	6	8	13	5	5	13	17	5	5	2	8	11	10	372
3	(Spain) Griffin Core by Campos	2	5	1	4	3	3	2	1	16	6	5	4	1	3	7	2	1	3	368
3	(Spain) Griffin Core by Campos	11	7	3	6	28	5	10	4	Ret	8	6	6	4	9	13	5	18	4	368
4	(Spain) Palou Motorsport	5	10	6	1	8	11	4	7	8	4	7	7	7	4	9	9	14	20	98
4	(Spain) Palou Motorsport	14	17	11	11	14	15	15	13	10	18	17	14	18	Ret	11	17	22	23	98
5	(Netherlands) KCL by MP	12	13	10	2	16	13	9	9	9	12	12	2	9	6	5	11	9	7	68
5	(Netherlands) KCL by MP	16	18	Ret	Ret	17	Ret	22	DNS	13	13	14	18	17	12	8	18	Ret	15	68
6	(France) Saintéloc Racing	4	8	20	7	10	9	1	25	21†	14	11	12	10	15	10	15	6	13	43
6	(France) Saintéloc Racing	21	22	Ret	24	15	14	17	Ret	Ret	17	22	23	25	17	Ret	26	WD	WD	43
7	(Sweden) Allay Racing	24	25	21	21	25	20	25	22	11	23	2	20	27	20	21	22			18
7	(Sweden) Allay Racing	25	Ret	Ret	Ret	27	21	26	23	14	26	24	22	28	21	22	Ret			18
8	(Spain) Drivex	10	15	12	13	11	17	12	10	19†	15	15	13	12	8	15	14	13	5	16
8	(Spain) Drivex	19	21	15	14	18	21	14	14	22†	19	16	15	14	13	17	16	20	18	16
9	(Spain) GRS Team	7	9	9	12	13	WD	WD	WD									8	11	16
9	(Spain) GRS Team																	10	19	16
10	(Spain) DXR						Ret	13	11									19	21	0
11	(Spain) Sparco Palou MS	23	19	16	18	26	Ret	21	16	12	16	19	24	15	15	16	20	15	16	0
11	(Spain) Sparco Palou MS	26	26	Ret	19	29	Ret	24	19	Ret	24	27	Ret	26	19	23	23	16	Ret	0
teams only fielding guest drivers ineligible to score points:
—	(Spain) Tecnicar by Amtog															12	13	7	12	0
—	(Spain) Tecnicar by Amtog																	17	17	0
Pos	Driver	R1	R2	R1	SR	R2	R1	SR	R2	R1	R2	R1	R2	R1	R2	R1	R2	R1	R2	Pts
Pos	Driver	RBR (Austria)		POR (Portugal)			LEC (France)			MNZ (Italy)		ASS (Netherlands)		SPA (Belgium)		JER (Spain)		CAT (Spain)		Pts

== Winter series ==
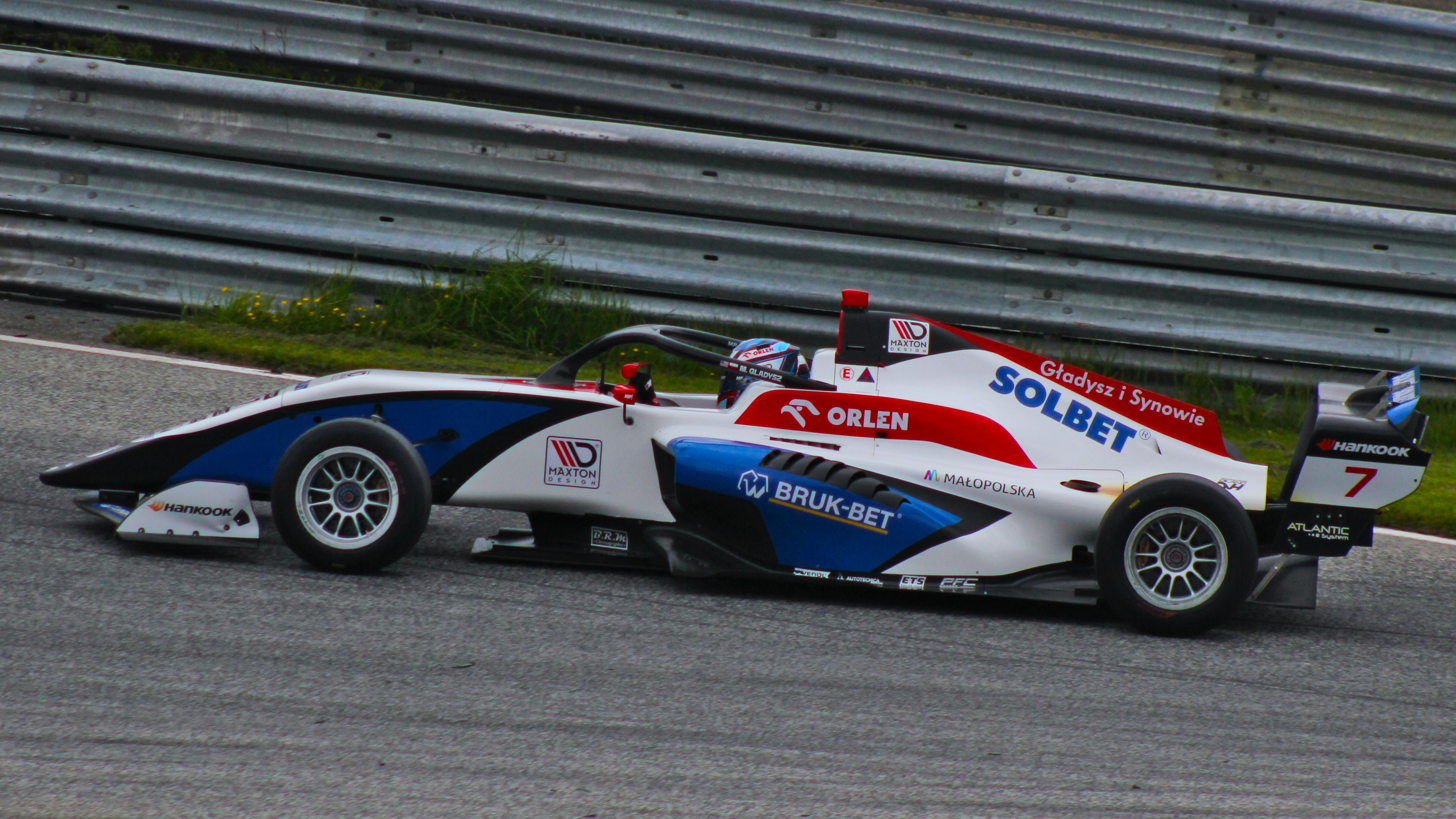
The Eurocup-3 Spanish Winter Championship was won by MP Motorsport's Maciej Gładysz.

After Eurocup-3 held a one-off non-championship winter event in 2024, plans for a full winter championship were revealed in late September of the same year. This winter championship, together with its Eurocup-4 counterpart, was then officially launched a few days later, with its calendar and event format also confirmed.

MP Motorsport won the winter series' Teams' Championship at the penultimate round of the season, while Maciej Gładysz, driving for MP Motorsport's KCL-branded satellite team, won the Drivers' Championship at the final race of the season and in doing so also became the Rookie Champion.

=== Teams and drivers ===
Teams utilized the same Tatuus F3 T-318 chassis with a 270 hp Alfa Romeo-Autotecnica engine and Hankook tires used in the main series.

Team	No.	Driver	Status	Rounds
(Spain) / Campos Racing (Note: Cars No. 8, No. 24, and No. 83 entered as Campos Racing; cars No. 2, No. 27, and No. 37 entered as Griffin Core by Campos.); (Spain) / Griffin Core by Campos	2	(Portugal) Francisco Macedo	**R**	All
(Spain) / Campos Racing; (Spain) / Griffin Core by Campos	8	(Bulgaria) Nikola Tsolov		1
(Spain) / Campos Racing; (Spain) / Griffin Core by Campos	8	(Thailand) Enzo Tarnvanichkul	**R**	2–3
(Spain) / Campos Racing; (Spain) / Griffin Core by Campos	24	(Thailand) Tasanapol Inthraphuvasak		1
(Spain) / Campos Racing; (Spain) / Griffin Core by Campos	24	(Spain) Lucas Fluxá	**R**	2
(Spain) / Campos Racing; (Spain) / Griffin Core by Campos	24	(Mexico) Ernesto Rivera	**R** **G**	3
(Spain) / Campos Racing; (Spain) / Griffin Core by Campos	27	(Mexico) Jesse Carrasquedo Jr.		All
(Spain) / Campos Racing; (Spain) / Griffin Core by Campos	37	(Poland) Kacper Sztuka		1–2
(Spain) / Campos Racing; (Spain) / Griffin Core by Campos	37	(Spain) Lucas Fluxá	**R**	3
(Spain) / Campos Racing; (Spain) / Griffin Core by Campos	83	(France) Jules Caranta	**R**	All
(Spain) / Palou Motorsport (Note: Cars No. 5, No. 6, No. 26 and No. 48 entered as Palou Motorsport, cars No. 3 and No. 23 entered as Sparco Palou MS.); (Spain) / Sparco Palou MS	3	(Hungary) Ádám Hideg	**R**	All
(Spain) / Palou Motorsport; (Spain) / Sparco Palou MS	5	(France) Luciano Morano		All
(Spain) / Palou Motorsport; (Spain) / Sparco Palou MS	6	(New Zealand) Zack Scoular		2–3
(Spain) / Palou Motorsport; (Spain) / Sparco Palou MS	23	(Brazil) Alceu Feldmann Neto	**R**	All
(Spain) / Palou Motorsport; (Spain) / Sparco Palou MS	26	(United Kingdom) Isaac Barashi		All
(Spain) / Palou Motorsport; (Spain) / Sparco Palou MS	48	(United States) James Egozi	**R**	All
(Spain) Drivex	4	(Spain) Juan Cota	**R**	1–2
(Spain) Drivex	11	(Austria) Oscar Wurz	**R**	All
(Spain) Drivex	17	(Germany) Lenny Ried	**R**	All
(Spain) Drivex	21	(Kyrgyzstan) Victoria Blokhina		1–2
(Spain) Drivex	25	(United States) Preston Lambert	**R**	All
(Netherlands) / MP Motorsport (Note: Cars No. 12, No. 33, No. 55, No. 71 and No. 77 entered as MP Motorsport, cars No. 7, No. 18 and No. 87 entered as KCL by MP Motorsport.); (Netherlands) / KCL by MP Motorsport	7	(Poland) Maciej Gładysz	**R**	All
(Netherlands) / MP Motorsport; (Netherlands) / KCL by MP Motorsport	12	(Kazakhstan) Alexander Abkhazava		All
(Netherlands) / MP Motorsport; (Netherlands) / KCL by MP Motorsport	18	(Brazil) Matheus Comparatto	**R**	1
(Netherlands) / MP Motorsport; (Netherlands) / KCL by MP Motorsport	33	(Peru) Andrés Cárdenas	**R**	All
(Netherlands) / MP Motorsport; (Netherlands) / KCL by MP Motorsport	55	(Italy) Valerio Rinicella		2–3
(Netherlands) / MP Motorsport; (Netherlands) / KCL by MP Motorsport	71	(Italy) Mattia Colnaghi	**R**	All
(Netherlands) / MP Motorsport; (Netherlands) / KCL by MP Motorsport	77	(Brazil) Emerson Fittipaldi Jr.		All
(Netherlands) / MP Motorsport; (Netherlands) / KCL by MP Motorsport	87	(United Kingdom) Kai Daryanani	**G**	3
(France) Saintéloc Racing	10	(Mexico) Lorenzo Castillo	**R**	All
(France) Saintéloc Racing	18	(United States) Garrett Berry		2
(Sweden) Allay Racing	43	(Sweden) Emil Hellberg	**R**	All
(Sweden) Allay Racing	46	(Sweden) Linus Hellberg	**R**	All
(Spain) GRS Team	88	(Mexico) Cristian Cantú	**R**	1–2
(Spain) GRS Team	88	(Belgium) Yani Stevenheydens	**R**	3

Icon	Legend
**R**	Rookie
**G**	Guest driver

=== Race calendar ===
The calendar was revealed when the winter championship was launched on 4 October 2024. The first two rounds of the three-round 2024 season consisted of three races, therefore differing from Eurocup-3's normal format of two races per weekend. On 18 November, it was revealed that the last round at Circuito de Navarra would be replaced with a two-race round at MotorLand Aragón.

Round		Circuit	Date	Support bill	Map of circuit locations
1	R1	(Spain) Circuito de Jerez, Jerez de la Frontera	8 February	Eurocup-4 SWC	2025 Eurocup-3 season is located in Iberia
1	SR	(Spain) Circuito de Jerez, Jerez de la Frontera	8 February	Eurocup-4 SWC	2025 Eurocup-3 season is located in Iberia
1	R2	(Spain) Circuito de Jerez, Jerez de la Frontera	9 February	Eurocup-4 SWC	2025 Eurocup-3 season is located in Iberia
2	R1	(Portugal) Algarve International Circuit, Portimão	22 February	Eurocup-4 SWC	2025 Eurocup-3 season is located in Iberia
2	SR	(Portugal) Algarve International Circuit, Portimão	22 February	Eurocup-4 SWC	2025 Eurocup-3 season is located in Iberia
2	R2	(Portugal) Algarve International Circuit, Portimão	23 February	Eurocup-4 SWC	2025 Eurocup-3 season is located in Iberia
3	R1	(Spain) MotorLand Aragón, Alcañiz	29 March	TCR Spain Touring Car Championship; F4 Spanish Championship	2025 Eurocup-3 season is located in Iberia
3	R2	(Spain) MotorLand Aragón, Alcañiz	30 March	TCR Spain Touring Car Championship; F4 Spanish Championship	2025 Eurocup-3 season is located in Iberia

=== Race results ===
Round		Circuit	Pole position	Fastest lap	Winning driver	Winning team	Rookie winner
1	R1	(Spain) Circuito de Jerez	(Italy) Mattia Colnaghi	(Italy) Mattia Colnaghi	(Italy) Mattia Colnaghi	(Netherlands) MP Motorsport	(Italy) Mattia Colnaghi
1	SR	(Spain) Circuito de Jerez		(France) Jules Caranta	(Peru) Andrés Cárdenas	(Netherlands) MP Motorsport	(Peru) Andrés Cárdenas
1	R2	(Spain) Circuito de Jerez	(Poland) Maciej Gładysz	(Poland) Kacper Sztuka	(Poland) Maciej Gładysz	(Netherlands) KCL by MP Motorsport	(Poland) Maciej Gładysz
2	R1	(Portugal) Algarve International Circuit	(Italy) Valerio Rinicella	(Italy) Valerio Rinicella	(Italy) Valerio Rinicella	(Netherlands) MP Motorsport	(Poland) Maciej Gładysz
2	SR	(Portugal) Algarve International Circuit		(United States) James Egozi	(United States) James Egozi	(Spain) Palou Motorsport	(United States) James Egozi
2	R2	(Portugal) Algarve International Circuit	(Italy) Valerio Rinicella	(Italy) Valerio Rinicella	(Italy) Mattia Colnaghi	(Netherlands) MP Motorsport	(Italy) Mattia Colnaghi
3	R1	(Spain) MotorLand Aragón	(Poland) Maciej Gładysz	(Poland) Maciej Gładysz	(Poland) Maciej Gładysz	(Netherlands) KCL by MP Motorsport	(Poland) Maciej Gładysz
3	R2	(Spain) MotorLand Aragón	(United States) James Egozi	(Italy) Valerio Rinicella	(United States) James Egozi	(Spain) Palou Motorsport	(United States) James Egozi

=== Season report ===
The first edition of Eurocup-3's Winter series commenced at Circuito de Jerez with MP Motorsport’s Mattia Colnaghi taking pole position for the first race. At the start, Palou Motorsport’s James Egozi challenged Colnaghi, but the Italian kept first place. He controlled the race afterwards to secure victory, while Egozi was closely pursued by KCL/MP's Maciej Gładysz throughout the event. The second race saw MP's Andrés Cárdenas starting from reverse-grid pole position. His teammate Emerson Fittipaldi Jr. lined up alongside him before being overtaken by Drivex’s Juan Cota on the opening lap. That allowed Cárdenas to establish a lead and he went on to claim victory, while Fittipaldi was unable to regain second place despite persistent efforts. In the final race of the weekend, Gładysz secured pole position in qualifying. However, Campos Racing drivers Jules Caranta and Nikola Tsolov overtook him on the opening lap. The pair spent the next laps battling, before they collided. That allowed Gładysz to reclaim the lead, while Caranta dropped to second and Tsolov retired. Gładysz went on to win, with Colnaghi finishing third and concluding the opening weekend with a four-point lead in the standings.

The second round at the Algarve International Circuit featured a wet qualifying session, in which Rinicella secured pole position. The first race took place on a damp track, leading to an early reshuffling as Rinicella fell behind Egozi and Gładysz. Following a restart, Cárdenas joined the battle for the lead. Gładysz initially took first place while Egozi dropped to fourth, with Rinicella moving into second. The leading duo pulled away from the field before Rinicella reclaimed first place on the final lap to secure victory. In the second race, Egozi redeemed himself after his earlier loss. Starting from fourth, he overtook Rinicella and MP's Alexander Abkhazava before passing Drivex's pole-sitter Oscar Wurz on the second lap. Colnaghi and Rinicella also advanced past Wurz in the following laps but were unable to challenge Egozi for the win. The second qualifying session saw Rinicella claim another pole position. However, a slow start allowed Colnaghi to take the lead, with Gładysz slotting into third. The trio remained closely matched until Gładysz retired due to a technical issue, promoting Griffin Core's Kacper Sztuka to third. This result enabled Colnaghi to establish a 28-point advantage over Gładysz ahead of the final two races.

The final round of the Winter Championship took place at MotorLand Aragón. Gładysz was not ready to give up his title hopes, securing pole position for the first race and converting it into a lights-to-flag victory ahead of Griffin Core's Jesse Carrasquedo Jr. and Egozi. Colnaghi began the race in fourth but dropped to eighth following a slow start and later sustained damage in a collision, ultimately finishing 24th. With Gładysz also earning an additional point for the fastest lap, he and Colnaghi were tied on points heading into the final race. In qualifying for the final, Egozi secured pole position, with Gładysz lining up second. Colnaghi endured a difficult session and qualified 23rd, putting him at a significant disadvantage. That allowed Gładysz to be content with following Egozi home to finish second and secure the championship title.

The inaugural Spanish Winter Championship was a success by various metrics. Despite facing competition from established Formula Regional championships in the Middle East and Oceania, the series attracted a high number of entries from the outset, benefiting from the momentum generated by the Eurocup-3 series over the previous two years. Although the championship comprised only eight races held over three weekends, it featured a closely contested title battle between Gładysz, Colnaghi and Egozi.

=== Championship standings ===
==== Scoring system ====
For the first and last races of the weekend, points were awarded as follows:

Position	**1st**	**2nd**	**3rd**	**4th**	**5th**	**6th**	**7th**	**8th**	**9th**	**10th**	**Pole**	**FL**
Points	25	18	15	12	10	8	6	4	2	1	2	1

The second race of the weekend, called the sprint race, was shorter and therefore awarded less points:

Position	**1st**	**2nd**	**3rd**	**4th**	**5th**	**6th**	**7th**	**8th**	**9th**	**FL**
Points	18	15	12	10	8	6	4	2	1	1

Two points were awarded for qualifying on pole position, and one point was awarded for setting the fastest lap during a race.

No sprint race was held at the final round as it only featured two races.

==== Drivers' standings ====
Pos	Driver	JER (Spain)			POR (Portugal)			ARA (Spain)		Pts
Pos	Driver	R1	SR	R2	R1	SR	R2	R1	R2	Pts
1	(Poland) Maciej Gładysz	3	9	**1**	2	5	26†	**1**	2	115
2	(Italy) Mattia Colnaghi	**1**	7	3	5	2	1	24	13	97
3	(United States) James Egozi	2	6	9	12	1	4	10	**1**	86
4	(Peru) Andrés Cárdenas	6	1	12	3	7	7	4	3	78
5	(Italy) Valerio Rinicella				**1**	3	**2**	13	7	70
6	(Brazil) Emerson Fittipaldi Jr.	8	3	6	8	9	5	3	Ret	54
7	(France) Jules Caranta	7	10	2	10	6	11	7	8	46
8	(Mexico) Jesse Carrasquedo Jr.	Ret	8	5	16	24†	13	2	4	42
9	(Spain) Lucas Fluxá				7	21	6	6	9	28
10	(Spain) Juan Cota	5	2	15	17	8	14			27
11	(Poland) Kacper Sztuka	9	5	10	11	Ret	3			27
12	(Bulgaria) Nikola Tsolov	4	4	Ret						22
13	(Thailand) Enzo Tarnvanichkul				6	19	8	12	6	22
14	(Austria) Oscar Wurz	10	11	7	9	4	12	15	12	20
15	(Kazakhstan) Alexander Abkhazava	18	24†	8	4	11	9	11	19	19
16	(Thailand) Tasanapol Inthraphuvasak	11	12	4						12
17	(France) Luciano Morano	14	16	16	14	12	17	8	15	6
18	(United States) Preston Lambert	17	Ret	11	Ret	10	15	9	16	4
19	(Hungary) Ádám Hideg	13	17	Ret	13	13	16	14	10	2
20	(United States) Garrett Berry				DSQ	DSQ	10			1
21	(Germany) Lenny Ried	12	15	Ret	21†	22	24	21	14	0
22	(Portugal) Francisco Macedo	16	13	13	Ret	Ret	WD	25†	24	0
23	(United Kingdom) Isaac Barashi	23	14	14	Ret	14	18	23	25†	0
24	(Mexico) Lorenzo Castillo	15	18	19	15	15	20	19	17	0
25	(New Zealand) Zack Scoular				22	16	23	Ret	22	0
26	(Sweden) Emil Hellberg	21	22	17	18	17	21	20	20	0
27	(Sweden) Linus Hellberg	DNS	20	Ret	19	18	22	18	18	0
28	(Mexico) Cristian Cantú	19	19	18	Ret	20	19			0
29	(Brazil) Alceu Feldmann Neto	22	23	20	20	23	25	22	23	0
30	(Kyrgyzstan) Victoria Blokhina	20	21	21	WD	WD	WD			0
—	(Brazil) Matheus Comparatto	WD	WD	WD						0
guest drivers ineligible to score points
—	(Mexico) Ernesto Rivera							5	5	0
—	(Belgium) Yani Stevenheydens							17	11	0
—	(United Kingdom) Kai Daryanani							16	21	0
Pos	Driver	R1	SR	R2	R1	SR	R2	R1	R2	Pts
Pos	Driver	JER (Spain)			POR (Portugal)			ARA (Spain)		Pts

Colour	Result
Gold	Winner
Silver	Second place
Bronze	Third place
Green	Points classification
Blue	Non-points classification
Blue	Non-classified finish (NC)
Purple	Retired, not classified (Ret)
Red	Did not qualify (DNQ)
Red	Did not pre-qualify (DNPQ)
Black	Disqualified (DSQ)
White	Did not start (DNS)
White	Withdrew (WD)
White	Race cancelled (C)
Blank	Did not practice (DNP)
Blank	Did not arrive (DNA)
Blank	Excluded (EX)

**Bold** – Pole

Italics – Fastest Lap

† — Did not finish, but classified
Rookie

==== Teams' standings ====
Each team counted their two best results per race and the bonus points for fastest laps if applicable.

Pos	Driver	JER (Spain)			POR (Portugal)			ARA (Spain)		Pts
Pos	Driver	R1	SR	R2	R1	SR	R2	R1	R2	Pts
1	(Netherlands) MP Motorsport	1	1	3	1	2	1	3	3	250
1	(Netherlands) MP Motorsport	6	3	6	3	3	2	4	7	250
2	(Spain) Campos Racing	4	4	2	6	6	6	7	6	115
2	(Spain) Campos Racing	7	10	4	7	19	8	12	8	115
3	(Netherlands) KCL by MP Motorsport	3	9	1	2	5	26†	1	2	111
3	(Netherlands) KCL by MP Motorsport	WD	WD	WD						111
4	(Spain) Palou Motorsport	2	6	9	12	1	4	8	1	90
4	(Spain) Palou Motorsport	14	14	14	14	12	17	10	15	90
5	(Spain) Griffin Core by Campos	9	5	5	11	24†	3	2	4	83
5	(Spain) Griffin Core by Campos	16	8	10	16	Ret	13	6	9	83
6	(Spain) Drivex	5	2	7	9	4	12	9	12	51
6	(Spain) Drivex	10	11	11	17	8	14	15	14	51
7	(Spain) Sparco Palou MS	13	17	20	13	13	16	14	10	2
7	(Spain) Sparco Palou MS	22	23	Ret	20	23	25	22	23	2
8	(France) Saintéloc Racing	15	18	19	15	15	10	19	17	1
8	(France) Saintéloc Racing				DSQ	DSQ	20			1
9	(Spain) GRS Team	19	19	18	Ret	20	19	17	11	0
10	(Sweden) Allay Racing	21	20	17	18	17	21	18	18	0
10	(Sweden) Allay Racing	Ret	22	Ret	19	18	22	20	20	0
Pos	Driver	R1	SR	R2	R1	SR	R2	R1	R2	Pts
Pos	Driver	JER (Spain)			POR (Portugal)			ARA (Spain)		Pts
