= Alexander Abkhazava =

Georgian-Russian-Kazakh racing driver (born 2006)

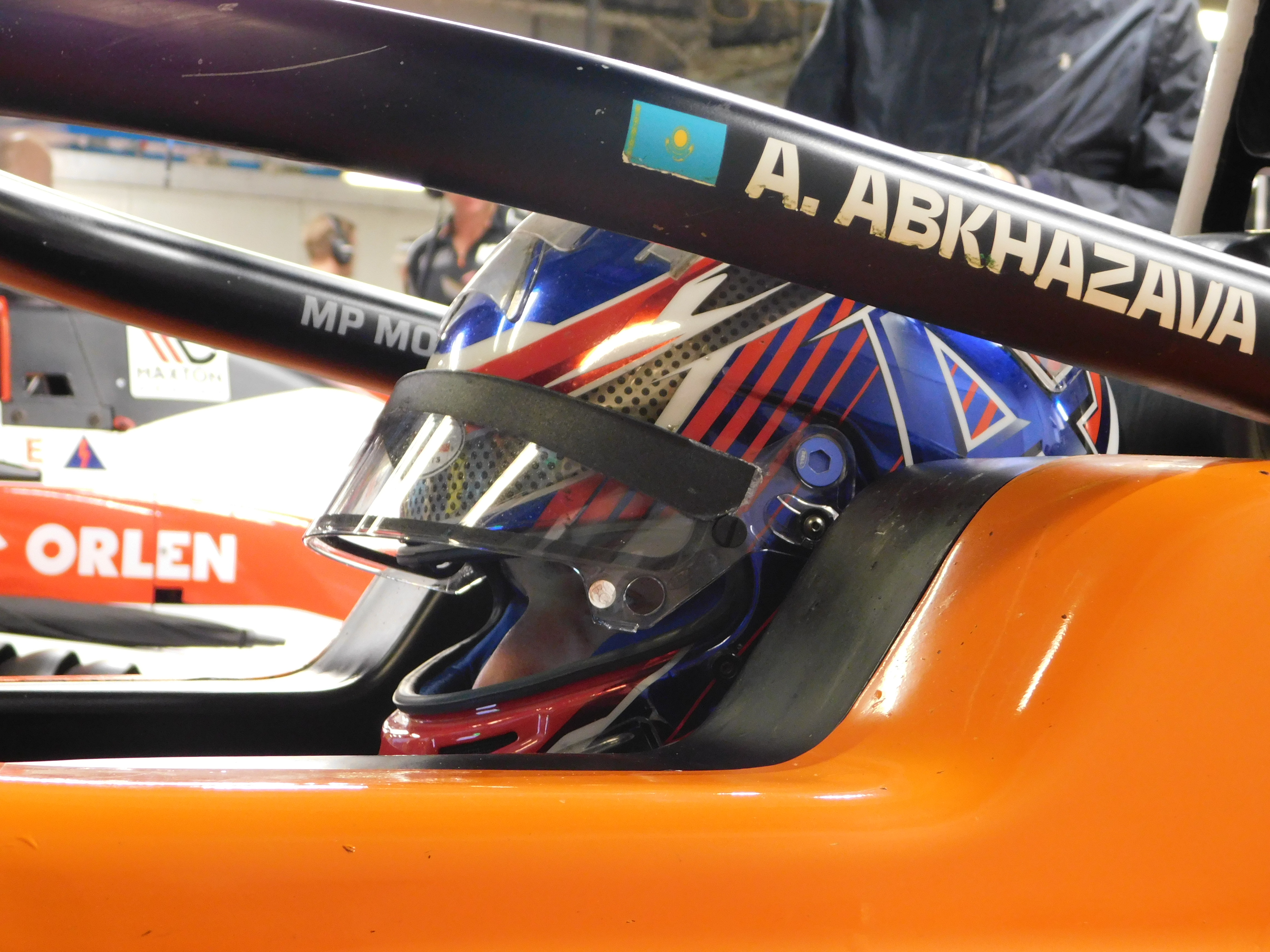
- Abkhazava in 2025
- Nationality: (Kazakhstan) Kazakh
- Born: Alexander Shotavich Abkhazava; 28 October 2006 (age 20) Moscow, Russia
- Relatives: Shota Abkhazava (father)

Formula Regional European Championship career
- Debut season: 2026
- Current team: MP Motorsport
- Car number: 15
- Starts: 19
- Wins: 0
- Podiums: 3
- Poles: 0
- Fastest laps: 1
- Best finish: 6th in 2026

Previous series
- 2025 2024–2025 2024, 2026 2023 2023: Eurocup-3 Spanish Winter; Eurocup-3; FR Middle East; F4 Spanish; F4 UAE
- Statistics up to date as of 18 September 2026.

Alexander Shotavich Abkhazava (born 28 October 2006) is a Russo-Georgian-born Kazakh racing driver who last competed in the Formula Regional European Championship with MP Motorsport.

Abkhazava began his racing career in 2023, with his main campaign being the 2023 F4 Spanish Championship with Drivex. He then moved up to Eurocup-3, competing in the 2024 season with Saintéloc Racing and the 2025 season with MP Motorsport.

== Career ==
=== Karting ===
Abkhazava mostly competed in Rotax karting, most notably finishing tenth in the 2020 Rotax Winter Cup in Junior Max and in the 2021 Rotax Max Golden Trophy in Senior Max.

=== Formula 4 ===
In early 2023, it was announced that Abkhazava would be stepping up to cars with R-ace GP in the 2023 Formula 4 UAE Championship. He finished 28th in the drivers' standings, with a best result of 9th place at Kuwait Motor Town. Abkhazava then moved over to Europe, and he would be competing in the 2023 F4 Spanish Championship with Drivex. He subsequently finished 24th in the standings to cap off a disappointing year, with a best result of tenth.

=== Formula Regional ===
==== 2024 ====
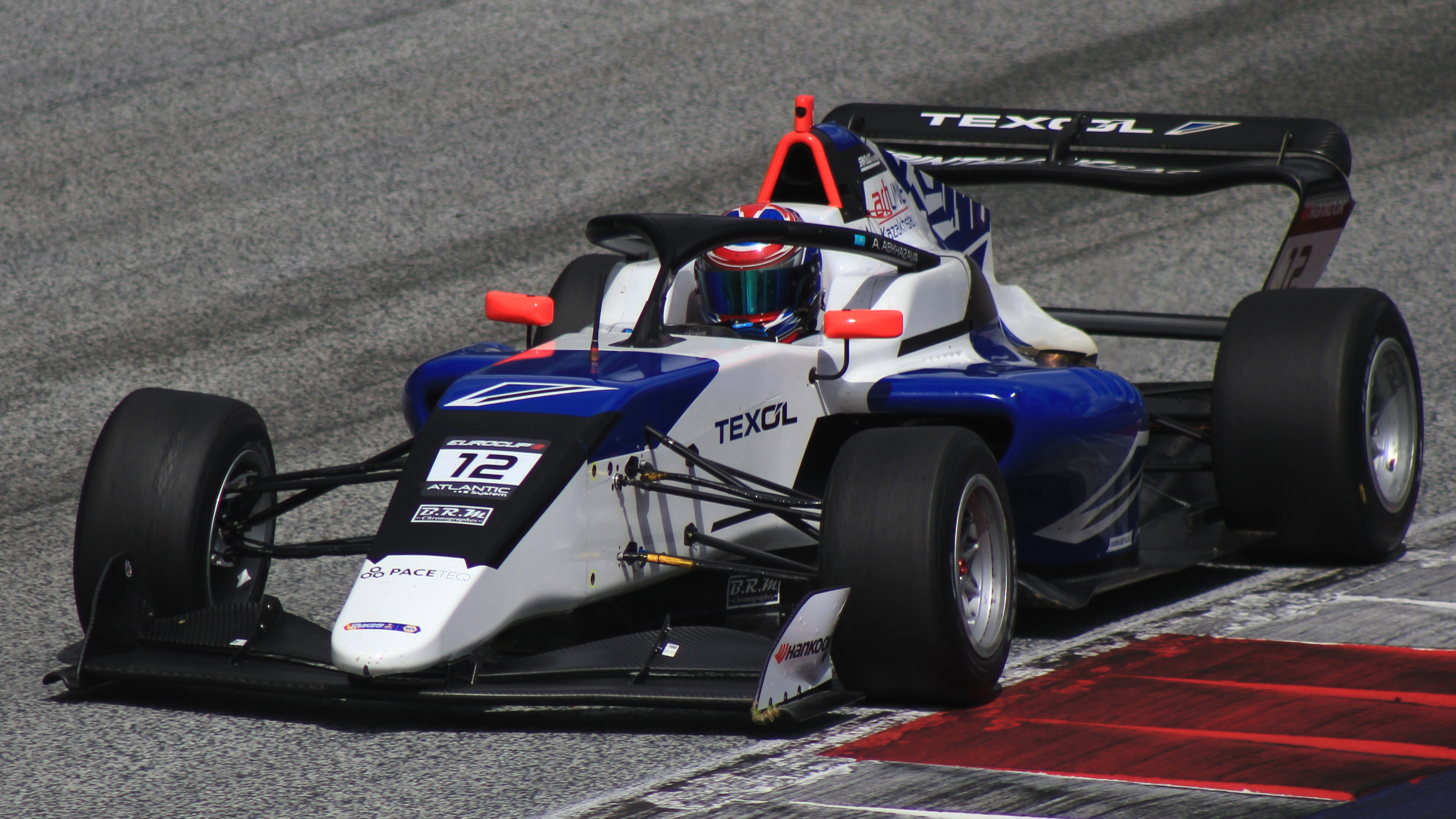
Abkhazava driving at the Red Bull Ring during the 2024 Eurocup-3 season

In January 2024, it was confirmed that Abkhazava would be contesting the full 2024 Formula Regional Middle East Championship season with Pinnacle Motorsport. Abkhazava had a breakthrough season, finishing in 15th in the standings after a best result of fourth place in the first round at Yas Marina. He ended up scoring 20 points over the course of the season.

For his main campaign, Abkhazava drove for Saintéloc Racing during the full 2024 Eurocup-3 season. On his debut, he finished second in an eventful race at Spa-Francorchamps. He secured his first victory in the championship in the third race of the third round at Algarve. However, Abkhazava endured a tough second half of the season in the series, seeing him fall to an eventual ninth-placed finish in the championship standings. Abkhazava then contested the 2024 Formula Regional World Cup, hosted at the Guia Circuit in Macau, where he finished ninth.

==== 2025 ====
Abkhazava switched to MP Motorsport for the 2025 Eurocup-3 season, stating his goal to be to "vie for the championship". He also competed with the team in the Eurocup-3 Spanish Winter Championship. He finished 15th in the winter series standings with 19 points, his best finish being fourth in the first race at Portimão. In the main series, he was unable to better his results from his rookie season, and he finished 12th overall with two podiums.

==== 2026 ====
At the start of 2026, Abkhazava raced in the Formula Regional Middle East Trophy, continuing his partnership with MP Motorsport. He took two wins during the series – one in the opening race of the season, which made him the first driver to take pole position and win a race in the new Tatuus F3 T-326 car, and a lights-to-flag victory in round three at the Dubai Autodrome. With one additional podium, he finished third overall in the standings.

Abkhazava remained with MP Motorsport as he moved to the Formula Regional European Championship for his main campaign. He took his first podium in the series in round three at Spa-Francorchamps, moving from fifth to second during the race.

== Personal life ==
Abkhazava is the son of ArtLine Engineering founder Shota Abkhazava.

== Karting record ==
=== Karting career summary ===
Season	Series	Team (s)	Position
2018	Hungarian International Open Championship - Mini Max	Haralds Slegelmilhs	18th
2019	Rotax Max Euro Trophy - Rotax Junior	Dan Holland Racing	19th
2019	Rotax Max Challenge International Trophy - Rotax Junior	Artline Racing Team	37th (Note: Abkhazava won the B Final, for drivers who qualified in positions 37 to 72.)
2019	Rotax Challenge Grand Finals - Rotax Junior	Artline Team Georgia	70th
2020	Rotax Winter Cup - Rotax Junior	Dan Holland Racing	10th
2021	Rotax Max Euro Trophy - Rotax Senior	Dan Holland Racing	20th
2021	Rotax Max Challenge International Trophy - Rotax Senior	Dan Holland Racing	27th
2021	Rotax Max Euro Golden Trophy - Rotax Senior	Dan Holland Racing	10th
2022	Rotax Winter Cup - Rotax Senior	Dan Holland Racing	24th
2022	Rotax Max Euro Trophy - Rotax Senior	Dan Holland Racing	14th
2022	Rotax Challenge Grand Finals - Rotax Senior	Dan Holland Racing	40th

== Racing record ==
=== Racing career summary ===
Season	Series	Team	Races	Wins	Poles	F/Laps	Podiums	Points	Position
2023	Formula 4 UAE Championship	R-ace GP	15	0	0	0	0	2	28th
2023	F4 Spanish Championship	Drivex	21	0	0	0	0	2	24th
2024	Formula Regional Middle East Championship	Pinnacle Motorsport	15	0	0	0	0	20	15th
2024	Eurocup-3	Saintéloc Racing	16	1	0	0	2	76	9th
2024	Macau Grand Prix	Saintéloc Racing	1	0	0	0	0	N/A	9th
2024	Ultimate Cup Series - Challenge Monoplace - F3R (13 inch)	ART-Line Virage	3	0	0	0	3	68	13th
2024	Russian Circuit Racing Series - Sports Prototype CN	Russian Ring	?	?	?	?	?	?	?
2025	Eurocup-3 Spanish Winter Championship	MP Motorsport	8	0	0	0	0	19	15th
2025	Eurocup-3	KCL by MP	18	0	0	0	2	53	12th
2025	Russian Circuit Racing Series - Sports Prototype CN	Texol Racing	?	?	?	?	?	?	?
2026	Formula Regional Middle East Trophy	MP Motorsport	11	2	1	0	3	95	**3rd**
2026	Formula Regional European Championship	MP Motorsport	19	0	0	1	3	100	6th

=== Complete Formula 4 UAE Championship results ===
(key) (Races in bold indicate pole position) (Races in italics indicate fastest lap)

Year	Entrant	1	2	3	4	5	6	7	8	9	10	11	12	13	14	15	DC	Points
2023	R-ace GP	DUB1; 1; 17	DUB1; 2; 27	DUB1; 3; 15	KMT1; 1 Ret	KMT1; 2; 19	KMT1; 3; 19	KMT2; 1; 21	KMT2; 2 Ret	KMT2; 3; 9	DUB2; 1; 30	DUB2; 2; 20	DUB2; 3; 18	YMC; 1; 32†	YMC; 2 Ret	YMC; 3; 21	28th	2

=== Complete F4 Spanish Championship results ===
(key) (Races in bold indicate pole position) (Races in italics indicate fastest lap)

Year	Team	1	2	3	4	5	6	7	8	9	10	11	12	13	14	15	16	17	18	19	20	21	DC	Points
2023	Drivex	SPA; 1; 15	SPA; 2; 19	SPA; 3; 20	ARA; 1; 17	ARA; 2; 15	ARA; 3; 12	NAV; 1; 11	NAV; 2; 28	NAV; 3; 11	JER; 1; 13	JER; 2; 33†	JER; 3; 15	EST; 1 Ret	EST; 2; 22	EST; 3 Ret	CRT; 1; 10	CRT; 2; 17	CRT; 3; 10	CAT; 1; 22	CAT; 2; 24	CAT; 3 Ret	24th	2

=== Complete Formula Regional Middle East Championship / Trophy results ===
(key) (Races in bold indicate pole position) (Races in italics indicate fastest lap)

Year	Entrant	1	2	3	4	5	6	7	8	9	10	11	12	13	14	15	DC	Points
2024	Pinnacle Motorsport	YMC1; 1; 9	YMC1; 2; 4	YMC1; 3; 16	YMC2; 1 Ret	YMC2; 2; 15	YMC2; 3; 16	DUB1; 1; 20	DUB1; 2; 17	DUB1; 3; 17	YMC3; 1; 7	YMC3; 2 Ret	YMC3; 3; 23†	DUB2; 1; 15	DUB2; 2 Ret	DUB2; 3; 16	15th	20
2026	MP Motorsport	**YMC1**; **1**; 1	YMC1; 2; 6	YMC1; 3; 17	YMC2; 1; 10	YMC2; 2 Ret	YMC2; 3; 4	DUB; 1; 2	DUB; 2; 7	DUB; 3; 1	LUS; 1; 26	LUS; 2 C	LUS; 3 Ret				3rd	95

=== Complete Eurocup-3 results ===
(key) (Races in bold indicate pole position) (Races in italics indicate fastest lap)

Year	Team	1	2	3	4	5	6	7	8	9	10	11	12	13	14	15	16	17	18	DC	Points
2024	Saintéloc Racing	SPA; 1; 2	SPA; 2 C	RBR; 1; 6	RBR; 2; 24	POR; 1; 4	POR; 2 Ret	POR; 3; 1	LEC; 1; 6	LEC; 2; 9	ZAN; 1 Ret	ZAN; 2 Ret	ARA; 1; 25†	ARA; 2; 11	JER; 1; 13	JER; 2; 14	CAT; 1; 10	CAT; 2; 12		9th	76
2025	MP Motorsport	RBR; 1; 16	RBR; 2; 13	POR; 1 Ret	POR; SR; 2	POR; 2; 16	LEC; 1 Ret	LEC; SR; 22	LEC; 2; 9	MNZ; 1; 13	MNZ; 2; 12	ASS; 1; 12	ASS; 2; 2	SPA; 1; 17	SPA; 2; 6	JER; 1; 5	JER; 2; 18	CAT; 1 Ret	CAT; 2; 7	12th	53

=== Complete Macau Grand Prix results ===
Year	Team	Car	Qualifying	Quali Race	Main race
2024	(France) Saintéloc Racing	Tatuus F3 T318	17th	23rd	9th

=== Complete Eurocup-3 Spanish Winter Championship results ===
(key) (Races in bold indicate pole position) (Races in italics indicate fastest lap)

Year	Team	1	2	3	4	5	6	7	8	DC	Points
2025	MP Motorsport	JER; 1; 18	JER; 2; 24†	JER; 3; 8	POR; 1; 4	POR; 2; 11	POR; 3; 9	ARA; 1; 11	ARA; 2; 19	15th	19

=== Complete Formula Regional European Championship results ===
(key) (Races in bold indicate pole position) (Races in italics indicate fastest lap)

Year	Team	1	2	3	4	5	6	7	8	9	10	11	12	13	14	15	16	17	18	19	20	DC	Points
2026	MP Motorsport	RBR; 1; 7	RBR; 2 Ret	RBR; 3; 13	ZAN; 1; 7	ZAN; 2; 9	SPA; 1; 27	SPA; 2 C	SPA; 3; 2	MNZ; 1; 4	MNZ; 2 Ret	MNZ; 3 Ret	HUN; 1; 12	HUN; 2; 13	LEC; 1; 3	LEC; 2; 5	IMO; 1; 4	IMO; 2; 7	IMO; 3 Ret	HOC; 1; 13	HOC; 2; 3	6th	100
