= Francisco Macedo (racing driver) =

Portuguese racing driver (born 2008)

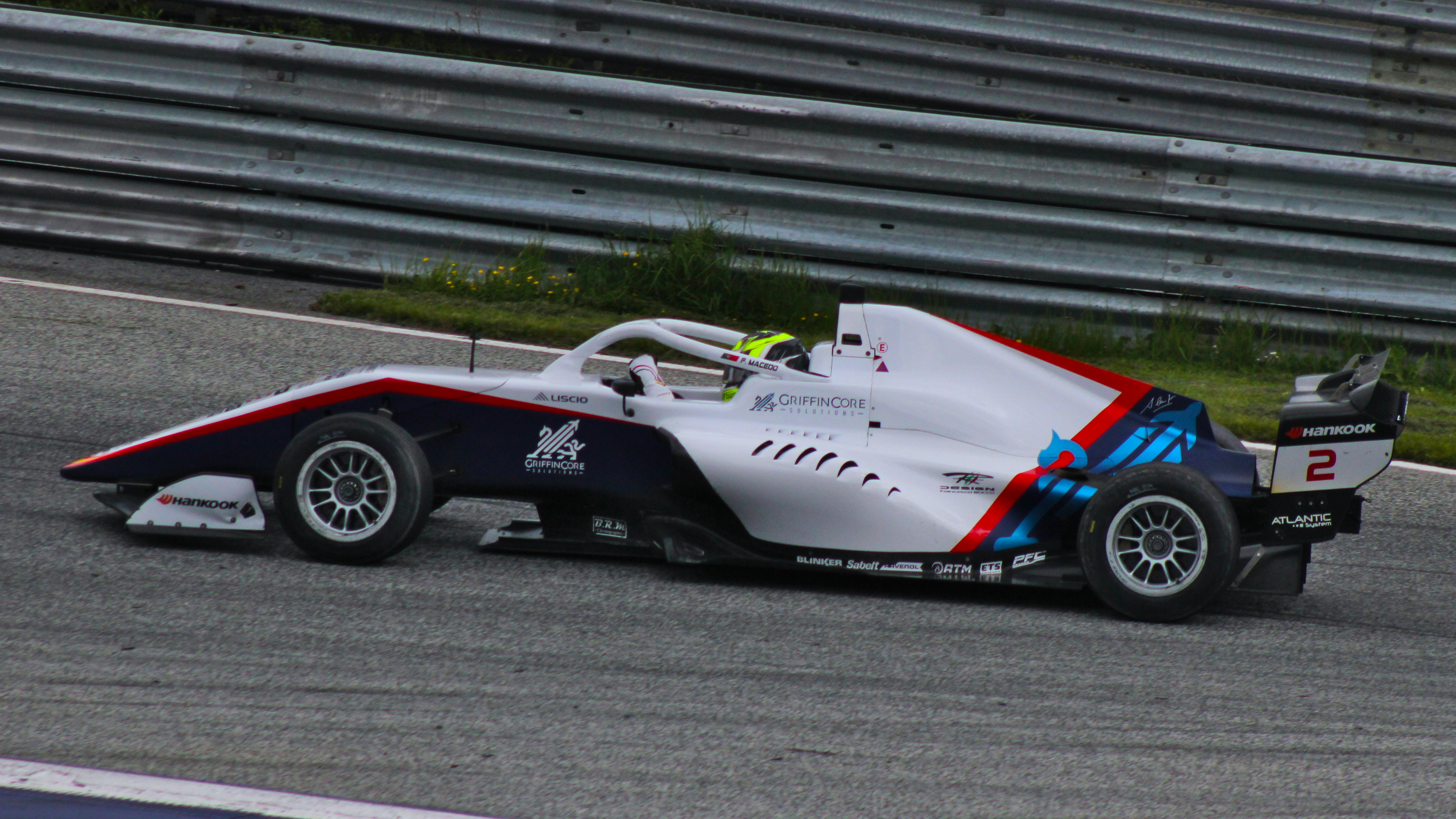
- Macedo driving at the Red Bull Ring during the 2025 Eurocup-3 season
- Nationality: (Portugal) Portuguese
- Born: 15 February 2008 (age 18) Braga, Portugal

Formula Regional European Championship career
- Debut season: 2026
- Car number: 11
- Former teams: Van Amersfoort Racing
- Starts: 14
- Wins: 0
- Podiums: 0
- Poles: 0
- Fastest laps: 0
- Best finish: 24th in 2026

Previous series
- 2026 2025–2026 2025 2024 2024 2024 2024: FR Middle East; Eurocup-3; Eurocup-3 Spanish Winter; FIA Motorsport Games Formula 4 Cup; Italian F4; F4 Spanish; Formula Winter Series
- Statistics up to date as of 14 November 2026.

Francisco "Kiko" Macedo (born 15 February 2008) is a Portuguese racing driver who last competed in the Formula Regional European Championship for Van Amersfoort Racing.

== Career ==
=== Karting (2021–2023) ===
Macedo joined the European karting scene in late 2021, where he made appearances in two IAME series. He followed this with a full year of European karting in 2022. Macedo had a tough year, with a 23rd-placed championship finish in the IAME Winter Cup being the best result he would achieve over the course of the year. He contested the Karting European Championship, and the Karting World Championship at the end of the year. For 2023, Macedo would step up to senior karting, and he had a much more successful year. He finished 22nd overall in the Karting European Championship, and 34th in the Champions of the Future series.

=== Formula 4 (2024) ===
In early 2024, it was announced that Macedo would debut his car racing career in the 2024 Formula Winter Series, driving for Drivex. He had a difficult debut, with a best result of 29th from the first round at Jerez. He made huge improvements over the course of the four-round season, eventually securing a best result of 13th from the final round of the season at the Circuit de Barcelona-Catalunya. He finished 35th in the standings. It was then confirmed that Macedo would continue with Drivex for the full 2024 F4 Spanish Championship season. In the first race of the season at Jarama, Macedo would go on to finish tenth, his first points finish in his racing career. After the first round, however, Macedo struggled to score points, finishing in the points just twice more; in the fourth found at Aragón and the fifth round at the Circuit Ricardo Tormo. Macedo yielded nine points over the course of the year, which was enough to place him 21st in the championship standings, and enough to beat all but one of his Drivex teammates.

=== Formula Regional (2025–) ===
==== 2025 ====
After a successful first venture into single-seater racing, Macedo was confirmed to be stepping up to join 2024 runners-up Campos Racing for the 2025 Eurocup-3 season. He started the year in the Winter Championship.

Macedo finished 14th in the standings in Eurocup-3 with one podium finish.

==== 2026 ====
Macedo started 2026 by competing in the Formula Regional Middle East Trophy with Van Amersfoort Racing.

Macedo remained with Van Amersfoort to race in the Formula Regional European Championship. For the final two rounds, he left the team and was replaced by Oleksandr Bondarev.

== Karting record ==
=== Karting career summary ===
| Season | Series | Team | Position |
|---|---|---|---|
| 2021 | IAME Euro Series – X30 Junior | Dino Motorsport | 90th |
| 2021 | International IAME Games – X30 Junior | Dino Motorsport | NC |
| 2022 | IAME Winter Cup – X30 Junior | | 23rd |
| 2022 | IAME Euro Series – X30 Junior | Monlau Competición | 48th |
| 2022 | CIK-FIA European Championship – OKJ | CRG Racing Team | 68th |
| 2022 | Champions of the Future – OKJ | CRG Racing Team | 77th |
| 2022 | WSK Euro Series – OKJ | CRG Racing Team | 49th |
| 2022 | Italian ACI Championship – OKJ | | 52nd |
| 2022 | CIK-FIA World Championship – OKJ | CRG Racing Team | NC |
| 2022 | WSK Final Cup – OK | CRG Racing Team | 46th |
| 2023 | IAME Winter Cup – X30 Senior | ART Pro Racing | 30th |
| 2023 | Champions of the Future – OK | CRG Racing Team | 34th |
| 2023 | CIK-FIA European Championship – OK | CRG Racing Team | 22nd |
| 2023 | CIK-FIA World Championship – OK | CRG Racing Team | NC |
| 2023 | IAME Warriors Final – X30 Senior | DPK Racing | NC |
| 2023 | Rotax Max Challenge Grand Finals – Senior Rotax | | NC |

== Racing record ==
=== Racing career summary ===
| Season | Series | Team | Races | Wins | Poles | F/Laps | Podiums | Points | Position |
|---|---|---|---|---|---|---|---|---|---|
| 2024 | Formula Winter Series | Drivex | 11 | 0 | 0 | 0 | 0 | 0 | 35th |
| 2024 | F4 Spanish Championship | DXR by Drivex | 20 | 0 | 0 | 0 | 0 | 9 | 21st |
| 2024 | Italian F4 Championship | Cram Motorsport | 3 | 0 | 0 | 0 | 0 | 0 | 43rd |
| 2024 | FIA Motorsport Games Formula 4 Cup | Team Portugal | 2 | 0 | 0 | 0 | 0 | N/A | 10th |
| 2025 | Eurocup-3 Spanish Winter Championship | Griffin Core by Campos | 7 | 0 | 0 | 0 | 0 | 0 | 23rd |
| 2025 | Eurocup-3 | Griffin Core by Campos | 17 | 0 | 0 | 1 | 1 | 37 | 14th |
| 2026 | Formula Regional Middle East Trophy | Van Amersfoort Racing | 11 | 0 | 0 | 0 | 0 | 12 | 18th |
| 2026 | Formula Regional European Championship | Van Amersfoort Racing | 14 | 0 | 0 | 1 | 0 | 10 | 24th |
| 2026 | Eurocup-3 | Griffin Core | 2 | 0 | 0 | 0 | 0 | 1 | 22nd |

* Season still in progress.

=== Complete Formula Winter Series results ===
(key) (Races in bold indicate pole position; races in italics indicate fastest lap)

| Year | Team | 1 | 2 | 3 | 4 | 5 | 6 | 7 | 8 | 9 | 10 | 11 | 12 | DC | Points |
|---|---|---|---|---|---|---|---|---|---|---|---|---|---|---|---|
| 2024 | Drivex | JER; 1; 30 | JER; 2; 33 | JER; 3; 29 | CRT; 1; 32 | CRT; 2; 32 | CRT; 3; 20 | ARA; 1; 34 | ARA; 2 Ret | ARA; 3; 27 | CAT; 1 C | CAT; 2; 13 | CAT; 3; 17 | 35th | 0 |

=== Complete F4 Spanish Championship results ===
(key) (Races in bold indicate pole position; races in italics indicate fastest lap)

| Year | Team | 1 | 2 | 3 | 4 | 5 | 6 | 7 | 8 | 9 | 10 | 11 | 12 | 13 | 14 | 15 | 16 | 17 | 18 | 19 | 20 | 21 | DC | Points |
|---|---|---|---|---|---|---|---|---|---|---|---|---|---|---|---|---|---|---|---|---|---|---|---|---|
| 2024 | DXR by Drivex | JAR; 1; 10 | JAR; 2; 30 | JAR; 3; 13 | POR; 1; 16 | POR; 2; 10 | POR; 3 DNS | LEC; 1; 15 | LEC; 2; 13 | LEC; 3; 16 | ARA; 1; 19 | ARA; 2; 22 | ARA; 3; 9 | CRT; 1; 28† | CRT; 2; 34† | CRT; 3; 7 | JER; 1; 31† | JER; 2 Ret | JER; 3; 22 | CAT; 1; 17 | CAT; 2; 12 | CAT; 3; 25 | 21st | 9 |

=== Complete Italian F4 Championship results ===
(key) (Races in bold indicate pole position) (Races in italics indicate fastest lap)

| Year | Team | 1 | 2 | 3 | 4 | 5 | 6 | 7 | 8 | 9 | 10 | 11 | 12 | 13 | 14 | 15 | 16 | 17 | 18 | 19 | 20 | 21 | DC | Points |
|---|---|---|---|---|---|---|---|---|---|---|---|---|---|---|---|---|---|---|---|---|---|---|---|---|
| 2024 | Cram Motorsport | MIS; 1 | MIS; 2 | MIS; 3 | IMO; 1; 18 | IMO; 2; 24 | IMO; 3 Ret | VLL; 1 | VLL; 2 | VLL; 3 | MUG; 1 | MUG; 2 | MUG; 3 | LEC; 1 | LEC; 2 | LEC; 3 | CAT; 1 | CAT; 2 | CAT; 3 | MNZ; 1 | MNZ; 2 | MNZ; 3 | 43rd | 0 |

=== Complete Eurocup-3 Spanish Winter Championship results ===
(key) (Races in bold indicate pole position) (Races in italics indicate fastest lap)

| Year | Team | 1 | 2 | 3 | 4 | 5 | 6 | 7 | 8 | DC | Points |
|---|---|---|---|---|---|---|---|---|---|---|---|
| 2025 | Griffin Core by Campos | JER; 1; 16 | JER; 2; 13 | JER; 3; 13 | POR; 1 Ret | POR; 2 Ret | POR; 3 WD | ARA; 1; 25† | ARA; 2; 24 | 23rd | 0 |

=== Complete Eurocup-3 results ===
(key) (Races in bold indicate pole position) (Races in italics indicate fastest lap)

| Year | Team | 1 | 2 | 3 | 4 | 5 | 6 | 7 | 8 | 9 | 10 | 11 | 12 | 13 | 14 | 15 | 16 | 17 | 18 | 19 | DC | Points |
|---|---|---|---|---|---|---|---|---|---|---|---|---|---|---|---|---|---|---|---|---|---|---|
| 2025 | Griffin Core by Campos | RBR; 1; 20 | RBR; 2; 11 | POR; 1; 23 | POR; SR; 4 | POR; 2 Ret | LEC; 1; 12 | LEC; SR; 2 | LEC; 2; 26 | MNZ; 1; 16 | MNZ; 2; 8 | ASS; 1; 25 | ASS; 2; 9 | SPA; 1; 13 | SPA; 2; 9 | JER; 1; 13 | JER; 2; 5 | CAT; 1 DNS | CAT; 2; 9 | | 14th | 37 |
| 2026 | Griffin Core | LEC; 1 | LEC; SR | LEC; 2 | POR; 1 | POR; 2 | IMO; 1 | IMO; SR | IMO; 2 | MNZ; 1 | MNZ; 2 | SIL; 1; 14 | SIL; 2; 10 | JER; 1 | JER; SR | JER; 2 | HUN; 1 | HUN; 2 | CAT; 1 | CAT; 2 | 22nd | 1 |

=== Complete Formula Regional Middle East Trophy results ===
(key) (Races in bold indicate pole position) (Races in italics indicate fastest lap)

| Year | Entrant | 1 | 2 | 3 | 4 | 5 | 6 | 7 | 8 | 9 | 10 | 11 | 12 | DC | Points |
|---|---|---|---|---|---|---|---|---|---|---|---|---|---|---|---|
| 2026 | Van Amersfoort Racing | YMC1; 1; 16 | YMC1; 2; 7 | YMC1; 3; 22 | YMC2; 1; 9 | YMC2; 2; 12 | YMC2; 3; 22 | DUB; 1; 13 | DUB; 2; 25† | DUB; 3; 8 | LUS; 1; 21 | LUS; 2 C | LUS; 3; 14 | 18th | 12 |

=== Complete Formula Regional European Championship results ===
(key) (Races in bold indicate pole position) (Races in italics indicate fastest lap)

| Year | Team | 1 | 2 | 3 | 4 | 5 | 6 | 7 | 8 | 9 | 10 | 11 | 12 | 13 | 14 | 15 | 16 | 17 | 18 | 19 | 20 | DC | Points |
|---|---|---|---|---|---|---|---|---|---|---|---|---|---|---|---|---|---|---|---|---|---|---|---|
| 2026 | Van Amersfoort Racing | RBR; 1; 18 | RBR; 2; 9 | RBR; 3; 21 | ZAN; 1; 15 | ZAN; 2; 23 | SPA; 1 Ret | SPA; 2 C | SPA; 3; 23 | MNZ; 1 Ret | MNZ; 2; 23 | MNZ; 3; 23 | HUN; 1; 17 | HUN; 2; 6 | LEC; 1; 28 | LEC; 2; 21 | IMO; 1 | IMO; 2 | IMO; 3 | HOC; 1 | HOC; 2 | 24th | 10 |
