= List of F1 Academy drivers =

This is a List of F1 Academy drivers, a list of drivers who have made at least one race start in the F1 Academy, established in 2023.

This list is accurate up to and including the Las Vegas round of the 2026 F1 Academy season.

== By name ==
Key
Symbol	Meaning
*	Driver has competed in the most recent round
†	Driver has won the F1 Academy championship
^	Wildcard entry only

Drivers in bold competed in the 2026 F1 Academy season.

Name	License	Seasons	Championship titles	Entries	Starts	Poles	Wins	Podiums	Fastest laps (Note: Overall fastest laps, not counting ones where points were inherited)	Points
Amna Al Qubaisi	United Arab Emirates	2023–2024	0	35	35	0	2	4	2	133
Hamda Al Qubaisi	United Arab Emirates	2023–2024	0	35	35	2	4	10	5	340
Farah Al Yousef^	Saudi Arabia	2025	0	2	2	0	0	0	0	0
Aiva Anagnostiadis	Australia	2025	0	10	10	0	0	0	0	5
**Chiara Bättig**^	Switzerland	2026	0	2	2	1	0	1	0	22
**Lisa Billard***	France	2025–2026	0	16	16	0	0	1	0	41
Lia Block	United States	2024–2025	0	28	28	0	1	2	0	81
**Megan Bruce***	United Kingdom	2025–2026	0	16	16	0	0	3	0	59
Léna Bühler	Switzerland	2023	0	21	21	2	2	13	1	222
Bianca Bustamante	Philippines	2023–2024	0	35	35	1	2	4	1	189
Maite Cáceres	Uruguay	2023	0	21	21	0	0	0	0	6
Chloe Chambers	United States	2024–2025	0	28	27	4	3	11	7	249
Chloe Chong	United Kingdom	2023, 2025	0	35	35	0	0	0	1	43
Joanne Ciconte	Australia	2025	0	14	14	0	0	0	0	8
**Kaylee Countryman***	United States	2026	0	14	14	0	0	1	0	14
Courtney Crone	United States	2024–2025	0	16	16	0	0	0	0	3
Emely de Heus	Netherlands	2023–2024	0	35	35	1	1	2	0	117
**Alexia Danielsson**^	Sweden	2026	0	3	2	0	0	0	0	0
**Ava Dobson***	United States	2025–2026	0	15	15	0	0	0	0	14
Jessica Edgar	United Kingdom	2023–2024	0	35	35	1	1	4	1	142
**Emma Felbermayr***	Austria	2025–2026	0	28	28	0	3	6	0	162
**Rafaela Ferreira***	Brazil	2025–2026	0	28	28	0	0	0	0	48
**Autumn Fisher**^	Canada	2026	0	3	3	0	0	0	0	0
**Zoe Florescu**^	Romania	2026	0	2	2	0	0	0	0	0
**Luna Fluxá***^	Spain	2026	0	2	2	0	0	0	0	10
**Nina Gademan***	Netherlands	2024–2026	0	30	30	0	3	11	0	221
Marta García†	Spain	2023	1 (2023)	21	21	5	7	12	6	278
Megan Gilkes	Canada	2023	0	21	21	0	0	0	0	31
**Natalia Granada***	Spain	2026	0	14	14	0	0	2	0	59
Chloe Grant	United Kingdom	2023	0	21	19	0	0	0	0	34
Logan Hannah^	United Arab Emirates	2024	0	3	3	0	0	0	0	1
Tina Hausmann	Switzerland	2024–2025	0	28	27	0	0	0	0	81
Nicole Havrda	Canada	2025	0	14	14	0	0	0	0	1
**Jade Jacquet***	France	2026	0	14	14	0	0	0	0	26
Reema Juffali^	Saudi Arabia	2024	0	2	2	0	0	0	0	0
**Esmee Kosterman***	Netherlands	2025–2026	0	16	16	0	0	0	1	18
**Alba Hurup Larsen***	Denmark	2025–2026	0	28	28	0	2	6	4	174
**Ella Lloyd***	United Kingdom	2024–2026	0	30	30	0	1	6	1	169
Lola Lovinfosse	France	2023–2024	0	35	35	0	0	3	0	84
Nerea Martí	Spain	2023–2024	0	35	35	1	1	10	1	317
Aurelia Nobels	Brazil	2024–2025	0	28	28	0	0	1	0	46
**Mathilda Paatz***	Germany	2025–2026	0	17	17	0	1	2	0	37
**Alisha Palmowski***†	United Kingdom	2024–2026	1 (2026)	29	29	7	7	14	6	310
Doriane Pin†	France	2024–2025	1 (2025)	28	28	5	7	16	11	389
Abbi Pulling†	United Kingdom	2023–2024	1 (2024)	35	35	12	9	21	10	513
**Rachel Robertson***	United Kingdom	2025–2026	0	16	16	0	0	0	0	33
Carrie Schreiner	Germany	2023–2024	0	35	35	1	1	1	0	90
**Ella Stevens***	United Kingdom	2026	0	14	14	0	0	0	0	10
**Shi Wei^**	China	2025–2026	0	4	4	0	0	0	0	0
**Payton Westcott***	United States	2025–2026	0	16	16	0	1	4	2	85
Maya Weug	Netherlands	2024–2025	0	28	27	3	4	17	3	334

== By racing license ==
License	Total drivers	Champions	Championships	Current	First driver(s)	Most recent driver(s)/ current driver(s)
Australia	2	0	0	0	Aiva Anagnostiadis, Joanne Ciconte (2025 Shanghai F1 Academy round)	Joanne Ciconte (2025 Las Vegas F1 Academy round)
Austria	1	0	0	1	Emma Felbermayr (2025 Shanghai F1 Academy round)	Emma Felbermayr (2026 Las Vegas F1 Academy round)
Brazil	2	0	0	1	Aurelia Nobels (2024 Jeddah F1 Academy round)	Rafaela Ferreira (2026 Las Vegas F1 Academy round)
Canada	3	0	0	0	Megan Gilkes (2023 Spielberg F1 Academy round)	Autumn Fisher (2026 Montreal F1 Academy round)
China	1	0	0	0	Shi Wei (2025 Shanghai F1 Academy round)	Shi Wei (2026 Shanghai F1 Academy round)
Denmark	1	0	0	1	Alba Hurup Larsen (2025 Shanghai F1 Academy round)	Alba Hurup Larsen (2026 Las Vegas F1 Academy round)
France	4	1 (Pin)	1 (2025)	2	Lola Lovinfosse (2023 Spielberg F1 Academy round)	Lisa Billard, Jade Jacquet (2026 Las Vegas F1 Academy round)
Germany	2	0	0	1	Carrie Schreiner (2023 Spielberg F1 Academy round)	Mathilda Paatz (2026 Las Vegas F1 Academy round)
Netherlands	4	0	0	2	Emely de Heus (2023 Spielberg F1 Academy round)	Nina Gademan, Esmee Kosterman (2026 Las Vegas F1 Academy round)
Philippines	1	0	0	0	Bianca Bustamante (2023 Spielberg F1 Academy round)	Bianca Bustamante (2024 Abu Dhabi F1 Academy round)
Romania	1	0	0	0	Zoe Florescu (2026 Zandvoort F1 Academy round)	Zoe Florescu (2026 Zandvoort F1 Academy round)
Saudi Arabia	2	0	0	0	Reema Juffali (2024 Jeddah F1 Academy round)	Farah Al Yousef (2025 Jeddah F1 Academy round)
Spain	4	1 (García)	1 (2023)	2	Marta García, Nerea Martí (2023 Spielberg F1 Academy round)	Natalia Granada, Luna Fluxá (2026 Las Vegas F1 Academy round)
Sweden	1	0	0	0	Alexia Danielsson (2026 Austin F1 Academy round)	Alexia Danielsson (2026 Austin F1 Academy round)
Switzerland	3	0	0	0	Léna Bühler (2023 Spielberg F1 Academy round)	Chiara Bättig (2026 Silverstone F1 Academy round)
United Arab Emirates	3	0	0	0	Amna Al Qubaisi, Hamda Al Qubaisi (2023 Spielberg F1 Academy round)	Amna Al Qubaisi, Hamda Al Qubaisi (2024 Abu Dhabi F1 Academy round)
United Kingdom	9	2 (Pulling, Palmowski)	2 (2024, 2026)	5	Chloe Chong, Jessica Edgar, Chloe Grant, Abbi Pulling (2023 Spielberg F1 Academy round)	Megan Bruce, Ella Lloyd, Alisha Palmowski, Rachel Robertson, Ella Stevens (2026 Las Vegas F1 Academy round)
United States	6	0	0	3	Lia Block, Chloe Chambers (2024 Jeddah F1 Academy round)	Kaylee Countryman, Ava Dobson, Payton Westcott (2026 Las Vegas F1 Academy round)
Uruguay	1	0	0	0	Maite Cáceres (2023 Spielberg F1 Academy round)	Maite Cáceres (2023 Austin F1 Academy round)
