= 2025 F4 Saudi Arabian Championship =

Motorsport season

The 2025 Aramco F4 Saudi Arabian Championship is the second season of the F4 Saudi Arabian Championship. It is a motor racing championship for open wheel, formula racing cars regulated according to FIA Formula 4 regulations and overseen by the national ASN, the Saudi Automobile and Motorcycle Federation. It began on 10 October at Bahrain International Circuit and will end at Jeddah Corniche Circuit on 6 December.

== Teams and drivers ==
All cars are run by Hitech Grand Prix trading as Altawkilat Motorsport.

Icon	Legend
R	Rookie
F	Female
G	Guest drivers ineligible to score points

Team	No.	Driver	Class	Rounds
Zahid	1	(Belgium) Thibaut Ramaekers	R	All
Zahid	2	(Poland) Wojciech Woda	R	3–4
Zahid	8	(Malta) Jacob Micallef	R	1
Zahid	15	(United States) Payton Westcott	F	5
Valvoline	4	(Saudi Arabia) Farah Al Yousef	F	All
Valvoline	12	(United Arab Emirates) Adam Al Azhari		1–4
Valvoline	3	(Netherlands) Nina Gademan	F	5
Caraagy	3	(Netherlands) Nina Gademan	F	1
Caraagy	9	(United Kingdom) Megan Bruce	F	All
Caraagy	98	(United Kingdom) Lewis Wherrell	R	3–4
Red Bull	5	(Sweden) Scott Lindblom		1–4
Red Bull	33	(Lebanon) Christopher El Feghali		5
Red Bull	89	(Switzerland) Chiara Bättig	R F	All
Peax	6	(United Kingdom) Kit Belofsky	R	All
Peax	55	(United States) Ava Dobson	F	All
Jaco	11	(Saudi Arabia) Faris Organji	R	All
Jaco	23	(United Arab Emirates) Theo Palmer		1–2
My-Car	46	(India) Ary Bansal		2, 5
My-Car	65	(Netherlands) Esmee Kosterman	F	2–5
Astop	56	(United Kingdom) Rachel Robertson	F	All
Astop	99	(Saudi Arabia) Abdullah Ayman Kamel		All

== Calendar ==
Round		Circuit	Date	Pole position	Fastest lap	Winning driver	Rookie winner	Female winner
1	R1	Bahrain International Circuit	11 October	(United Arab Emirates) Theo Palmer	(United Kingdom) Kit Belofsky	(United Kingdom) Kit Belofsky	(United Kingdom) Kit Belofsky	(Netherlands) Nina Gademan
1	R2	Bahrain International Circuit	12 October	(United Arab Emirates) Adam Al Azhari	(United Arab Emirates) Adam Al Azhari	(United Arab Emirates) Adam Al Azhari	(Belgium) Thibaut Ramaekers	(Netherlands) Nina Gademan
2	R1	Bahrain International Circuit	15 October	(United Arab Emirates) Adam Al Azhari	(United Arab Emirates) Adam Al Azhari	(United Arab Emirates) Adam Al Azhari	(United Kingdom) Kit Belofsky	(United States) Ava Dobson
2	R2	Bahrain International Circuit	16 October	(United Kingdom) Kit Belofsky	(India) Ary Bansal	(United Kingdom) Kit Belofsky	(United Kingdom) Kit Belofsky	(Netherlands) Esmee Kosterman
3	R1	(Saudi Arabia) Jeddah Corniche Circuit	10 November	(United Kingdom) Kit Belofsky	(United Arab Emirates) Adam Al Azhari	(United Kingdom) Lewis Wherrell	(United Kingdom) Lewis Wherrell	(Netherlands) Esmee Kosterman
3	R2	(Saudi Arabia) Jeddah Corniche Circuit	11 November	(United Arab Emirates) Adam Al Azhari	(United Arab Emirates) Adam Al Azhari	(Sweden) Scott Lindblom	(United Kingdom) Lewis Wherrell	(Netherlands) Esmee Kosterman
4	R1	(Saudi Arabia) Jeddah Corniche Circuit	14 November	(United Kingdom) Lewis Wherrell	(United Kingdom) Lewis Wherrell	(United Kingdom) Kit Belofsky	(United Kingdom) Kit Belofsky	(Netherlands) Esmee Kosterman
4	R2	(Saudi Arabia) Jeddah Corniche Circuit	15 November	(United Kingdom) Lewis Wherrell	(United Kingdom) Lewis Wherrell	(United Kingdom) Lewis Wherrell	(United Kingdom) Lewis Wherrell	(United States) Ava Dobson
5	R1	(Saudi Arabia) Jeddah Corniche Circuit	5 December	(India) Ary Bansal	(United Kingdom) Kit Belofsky	(United Kingdom) Kit Belofsky	(United Kingdom) Kit Belofsky	(Netherlands) Nina Gademan
5	R2	(Saudi Arabia) Jeddah Corniche Circuit	6 December	(India) Ary Bansal	(United Kingdom) Kit Belofsky	(India) Ary Bansal	(United Kingdom) Kit Belofsky	(United Kingdom) Rachel Robertson

== Championship standings ==
Points are awarded to the top 10 classified finishers in each race. No points are awarded for pole position or fastest lap.

Position	**1st**	**2nd**	**3rd**	**4th**	**5th**	**6th**	**7th**	**8th**	**9th**	**10th**
Points	25	18	15	12	10	8	6	4	2	1

=== Drivers' Championship ===
Pos	Driver	BHR1 (Bahrain)		BHR2 (Bahrain)		JED1 (Saudi Arabia)		JED2 (Saudi Arabia)		JED3 (Saudi Arabia)		Pts
Pos	Driver	R1	R2	R1	R2	R1	R2	R1	R2	R1	R2	Pts
1	(United Kingdom) Kit Belofsky	1	6	3	**1**	**2**	4	1	2	1	2	189
2	(United Arab Emirates) Adam Al Azhari	7	**1**	**1**	6	5	**2**	2	3			125
3	(Sweden) Scott Lindblom	5	5	2	3	3	1	3	14			108
4	(Belgium) Thibaut Ramaekers	6	4	6	5	4	6	4	4	4	5	104
5	(United Kingdom) Lewis Wherrell					1	3	**5**	**1**			75
6	(India) Ary Bansal			4	2					**2**	**1**	73
7	(Saudi Arabia) Abdullah Ayman Kamel	4	8	7	7	8	5	8	5	9	3	73
8	(United Arab Emirates) Theo Palmer	**3**	2	5	4							55
9	(Netherlands) Nina Gademan	2	3							5	Ret	43
10	(Netherlands) Esmee Kosterman			9	8	6	7	6	7	6	10	43
11	(United States) Ava Dobson	10	Ret	8	10	10	10	7	6	7	6	36
12	(Switzerland) Chiara Bättig	8	Ret	Ret	9	7	8	11	9	8	Ret	22
13	(United Kingdom) Rachel Robertson	Ret	Ret	10	13	11	9	12	8	Ret	4	19
14	(Lebanon) Christopher El Feghali									3	Ret	15
15	(United Kingdom) Megan Bruce	11	9	Ret	11	9	11	9	13	10	7	13
16	(Malta) Jacob Micallef	9	7									8
17	(United States) Payton Westcott									11	8	4
18	(Saudi Arabia) Farah Al Yousef	12	11	12	14	14	14	14	11	13	9	2
19	(Saudi Arabia) Faris Organji	Ret	10	11	12	13	13	13	10	12	11	2
20	(Poland) Wojciech Woda					12	12	10	12			1
Pos	Driver	R1	R2	R1	R2	R1	R2	R1	R2	R1	R2	Pts
Pos	Driver	BHR1 (Bahrain)		BHR2 (Bahrain)		JED1 (Saudi Arabia)		JED2 (Saudi Arabia)		JED3 (Saudi Arabia)		Pts

Colour	Result
Gold	Winner
Silver	Second place
Bronze	Third place
Green	Points classification
Blue	Non-points classification
Blue	Non-classified finish (NC)
Purple	Retired, not classified (Ret)
Red	Did not qualify (DNQ)
Red	Did not pre-qualify (DNPQ)
Black	Disqualified (DSQ)
White	Did not start (DNS)
White	Withdrew (WD)
White	Race cancelled (C)
Blank	Did not practice (DNP)
Blank	Did not arrive (DNA)
Blank	Excluded (EX)

**Bold** – Pole
Italics – Fastest Lap
† — Did not finish, but classified

Rookie
