= FIA Girls on Track – Rising Stars =

Racing car driver program

The FIA Girls on Track – Rising Stars program was created as a collaboration between the FIA's Women in Motorsports Commission and the Ferrari Driver Academy, in order to support young female drivers.
The programme was held for four consecutive years from 2020 to 2023, skipped in 2024, and returned in 2025.

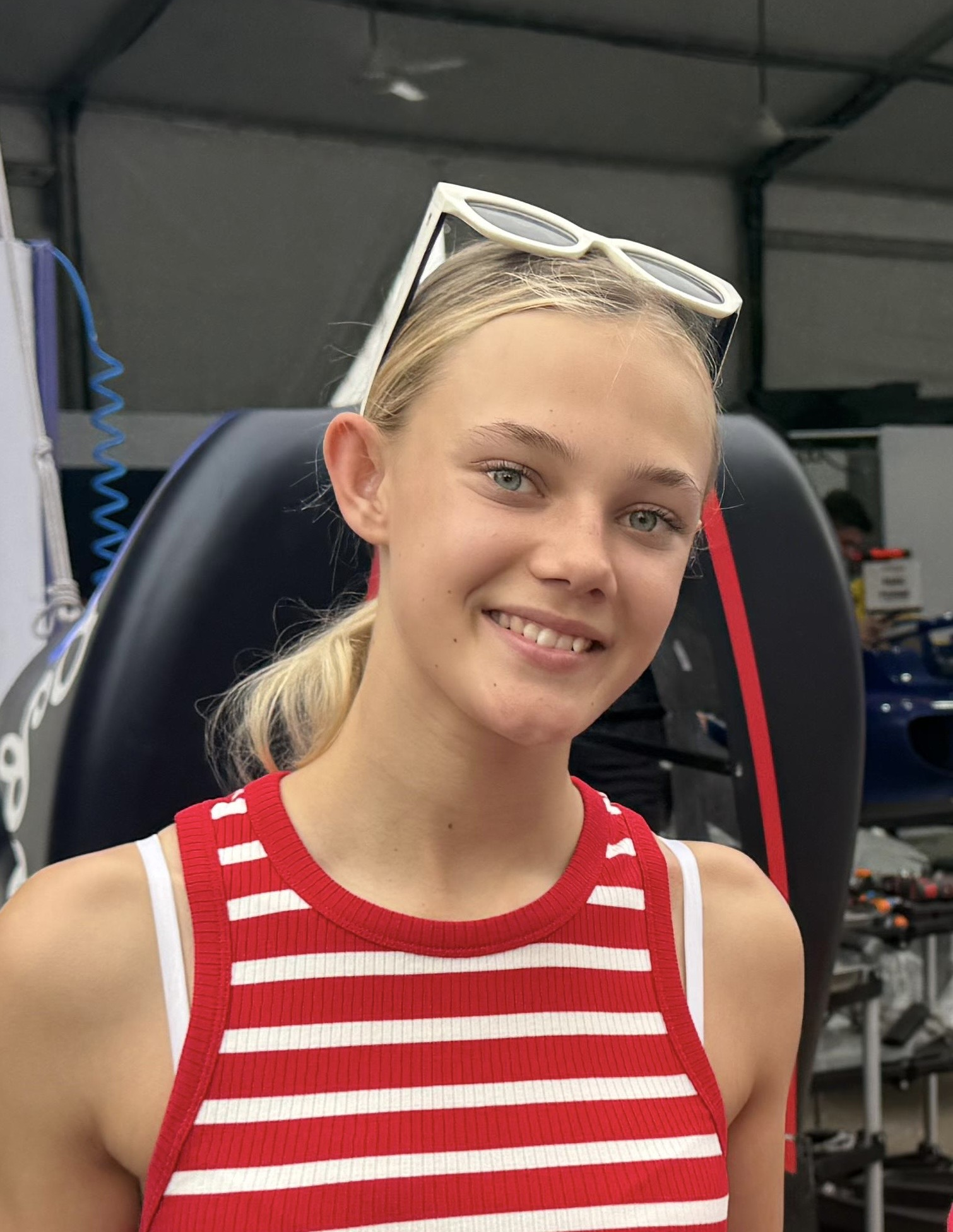
2023 winner Alba Hurup Larsen

Until 2023, each test included a training camp and a shootout. Talent scouts narrowed the drivers down to four finalists, and then one winner.
In 2025, the format was changed to a single training camp and shootout in which one winner was selected from nine participants.
From 2021 the drivers were separated into two categories, Junior (12–14) and Senior (14–16).

Maya Weug won the first edition in 2020, and became the first female driver to join the Ferrari Driver Academy. Weug raced in the Italian F4 Championship with Iron Dames, who partnered with the Rising Stars program in 2021, when Ferrari announced that they would be continuing with the program until 2023.

== 2020 ==
Driver	Notes
(Netherlands) Maya Weug	Winner (Note: Ferrari Driver Academy member between 2021 and 2025.)
(Brazil) Antonella Bassani	Finalist
(Brazil) Julia Ayoub	Finalist
(France) Doriane Pin	Finalist
(United Kingdom) Jessica Edgar	Third round
(Netherlands) Esmee Kosterman	Third round
(Switzerland) Toni Naudé	Third round
(Japan) Juju Noda	Third round
(Portugal) Matilde Ferreira	Second round
(France) Lola Lovinfosse	Second round
(Portugal) Mariana Machado	Second round
(United Kingdom) Ella Stevens	Second round
(Germany) Lilly Zug	Second round
(Sweden) Astrid Almlof	
(India) Aashi Hanspal	
(Denmark) Freya Normann	
(South Africa) Tyler Jean Robinson	
(Uzbekistan) Kristina Shipkova	
(Sweden) Milla Sjostrand	
(Poland) Kinga Wojcik	

== 2021 ==
=== Senior ===
Driver	Notes
(Spain) Laura Camps Torras	Winner (Note: Ferrari Driver Academy member in 2022 only.)
(Brazil) Julia Ayoub	Finalist
(Russia) Victoria Blokhina	Finalist
(Spain) Clarissa Dervic	Finalist
(Philippines) Bianca Bustamante	
(France) Tania Cirelli	
(United Kingdom) Jessica Edgar	
(United Kingdom) Macie Hitter	
(Sweden) Siri Hökfelt	
(Portugal) Matilde Magalhães	
(United Kingdom) Ella Stevens	
(Finland) Aada Turpeinen	
(Sweden) Emma Wigroth	
(Poland) Kinga Wojcik	

=== Junior ===
Driver	Notes
(Portugal) Maria Germano Neto	Winner
(Switzerland) Chiara Bättig	Finalist
(Mexico) Ivanna Richards	Finalist
(Sweden) Milla Sjöstrand	Finalist
(Slovakia) Laura Bubenová	
(Sweden) Alexia Danielsson	
(Poland) Wiktoria Kulesza	
(Finland) Nea Kytölä	
(Finland) Meri Levula	
(Switzerland) Kiana Naudé	
(United Kingdom) Skye Parker	
(Latvia) Alice Stolcermane	
(South Africa) Taya Van Der Laan	
(Belgium) Yinthe De Smet	

== 2022 ==
=== Senior ===
Driver	Notes
(Brazil) Aurelia Nobels	Winner (Note: Ferrari Driver Academy member between 2023 and 2025.)
(Australia) Alice Buckley	Finalist
(United Kingdom) Chloe Chong	Finalist
(Scotland) Chloe Grant	Finalist
(United Kingdom) Macie Hitter	
(Uruguay) Agustina Sanchez	

=== Junior ===
Driver	Notes
(Romania) Zoe Florescu Potolea	Winner
(France) Lisa Billard	Finalist
(Japan) Sara Matsui	Finalist
(Germany) Mathilda Paatz	Finalist
(Ecuador) Domenika Arellano	
(India) Shriya Lohia	
(Sweden) Tyra Sundberg	
(Portugal) Gabriela Teixeira	

== 2023 ==
=== Senior ===
Driver	Notes
(Denmark) Alba Hurup Larsen	Winner (Note: Ferrari Driver Academy member since 2026.)
(Ecuador) Domenika Arellano	Finalist
(Australia) Joanne Ciconte	Finalist
(Germany) Mathilda Paatz	Finalist
(Norway) Anniken Lindfjord	
(Finland) Meri Levula	
(Australia) Jure Portelli	
(Sweden) Milla Sjöstrand	

=== Junior ===
Driver	Notes
(Lithuania) Vanesa Šilkūnaitė	Winner
(Netherlands) Eva Dorrestijn	Finalist
(United Kingdom) Annabella Fairclough	Finalist
(Hungary) Bianca Nagy	Finalist
(Poland) Klara Kowalczyk	
(Czech Republic) Eliška Plná	
(Japan) Kanon Takahashi	
(Sweden) Ella Jönsson	

== 2025 ==
=== Junior ===
Driver	Notes
(Australia) Alana Gurney	Winner
(Japan) Mahiro Shimazu	
(Brazil) Marsella Assumpcao	
(United Kingdom) Andie Stewart	
(South Africa) Emma Rose Dowing	
(France) Julia Montlaur	
(Italy) Giada Vanigioli	
(Tunisia) Linda Hanini	
(Israel) Agam Shriky	
