= Chiara Bättig =

Swiss racing driver (born 2010)

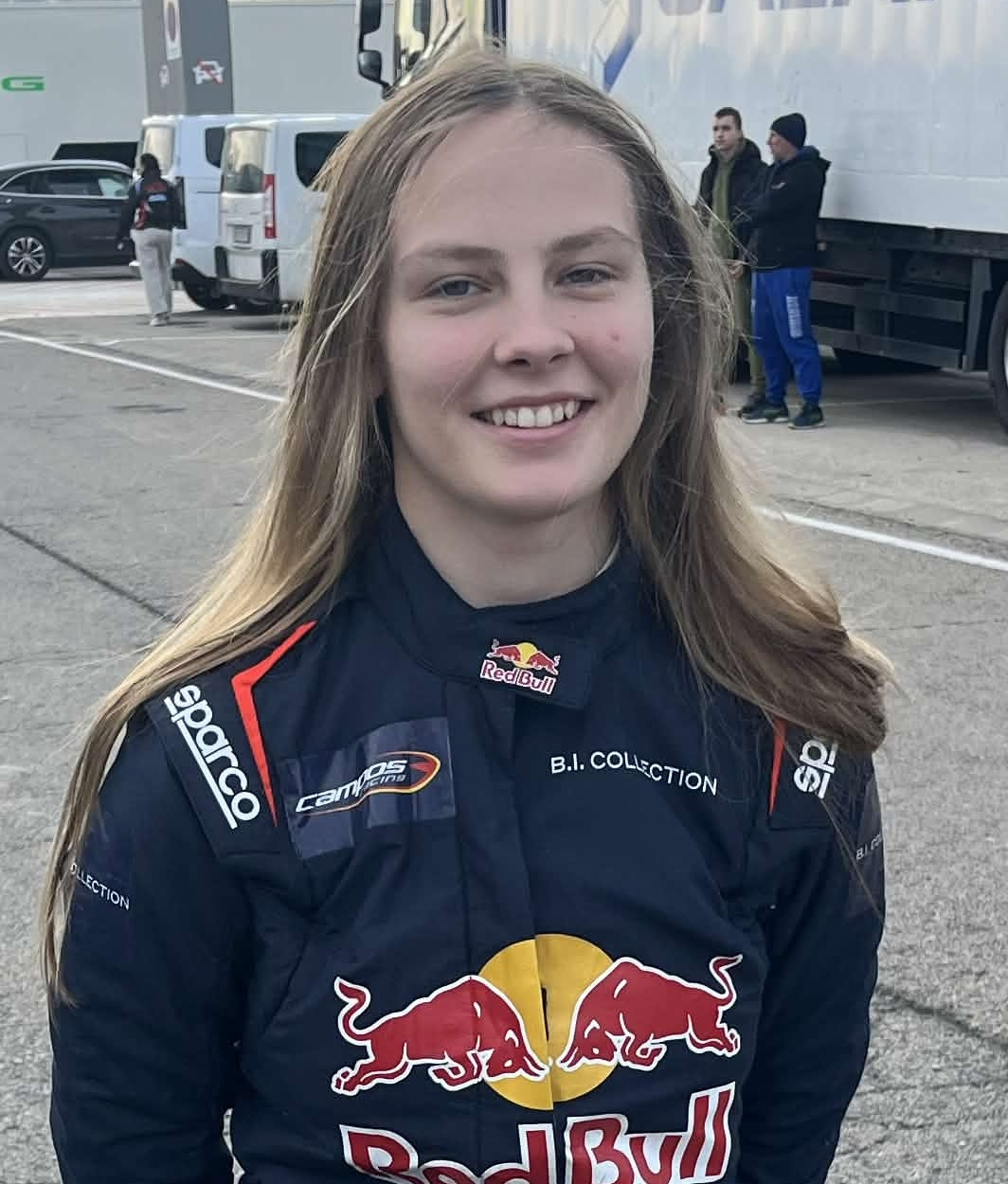
- Bättig in 2026
- Born: 21 March 2010 (age 16); Lucerne, Switzerland
- Nationality: (Switzerland) Swiss

F4 British Championship career
- Debut season: 2026
- Current team: Hitech
- Car number: 6
- Starts: 30
- Wins: 0
- Podiums: 1
- Poles: 0
- Fastest laps: 2
- Best finish: 13th in 2026

Previous series
- 2026; 2025: Formula Winter Series; F4 Saudi Arabian
- Statistics up to date as of 13 October 2026.
- Website: chiara-baettig.ch

Chiara Bättig (born 21 March 2010) is a Swiss racing driver who last competed in the F4 British Championship for Hitech as part of the Red Bull Junior Team.

Born in Lucerne, Bättig began competitive kart racing aged eight, winning three Swiss Championships before graduating to junior formulae in 2025. Having debuted in Saudi Arabia, she has achieved podiums in the Formula Winter Series, the F4 British Championship, and F1 Academy.

== Early life ==
Chiara Bättig was born on 21 March 2010 in Lucerne, Switzerland.

== Racing career ==
=== Karting (2018–2025) ===
Bättig began karting at the age of eight, competing until 2025. Racing in mini karts until 2021, she most notably finished second in the 2019 Trofeo Vega, as well as taking part in the 2021 FIA Girls on Track – Rising Stars junior shootout. Moving up to junior karts in 2022, Bättig won the Swiss Karting Championship in OK-J as the highest-placed rookie, as well as representing Switzerland in the Karting Academy Trophy.

After spending 2023 in the Alpine Rac(H)er Karting Programme and winning the Swiss Karting Championship's OK-J class, Bättig remained in junior karts for 2024. In her third season in the category, Bättig won the Swiss Karting Championship in OK-J for the third consecutive year, as well as the Trofeo Vega in X30 Junior, and also represented Switzerland in the Karting Sprint Junior discipline of the FIA Motorsport Games.

Moving to senior karts the following year, Bättig qualified on pole for her debut round at Campillos in the Karting European Championship. Also in 2025, Bättig participated in her only season in the Champions of the Future Academy Program, taking a lone win at Al Forsan as she secured runner-up honors in the OK-N standings.

=== Formula 4 (2025–present) ===
==== 2025: Junior formulae debut in Saudi Arabia ====
In late 2025, Bättig made her single-seater debut in the newly-relaunched F4 Saudi Arabian Championship. Starting out the season with eighth- and ninth-place finishes across the two Bahrain rounds, Bättig then took her season-best result of seventh in the first Jeddah round, before scoring two more points finishes across the following two rounds at Jeddah en route to a 12th-place points finish.

==== 2026: Rookie season ====
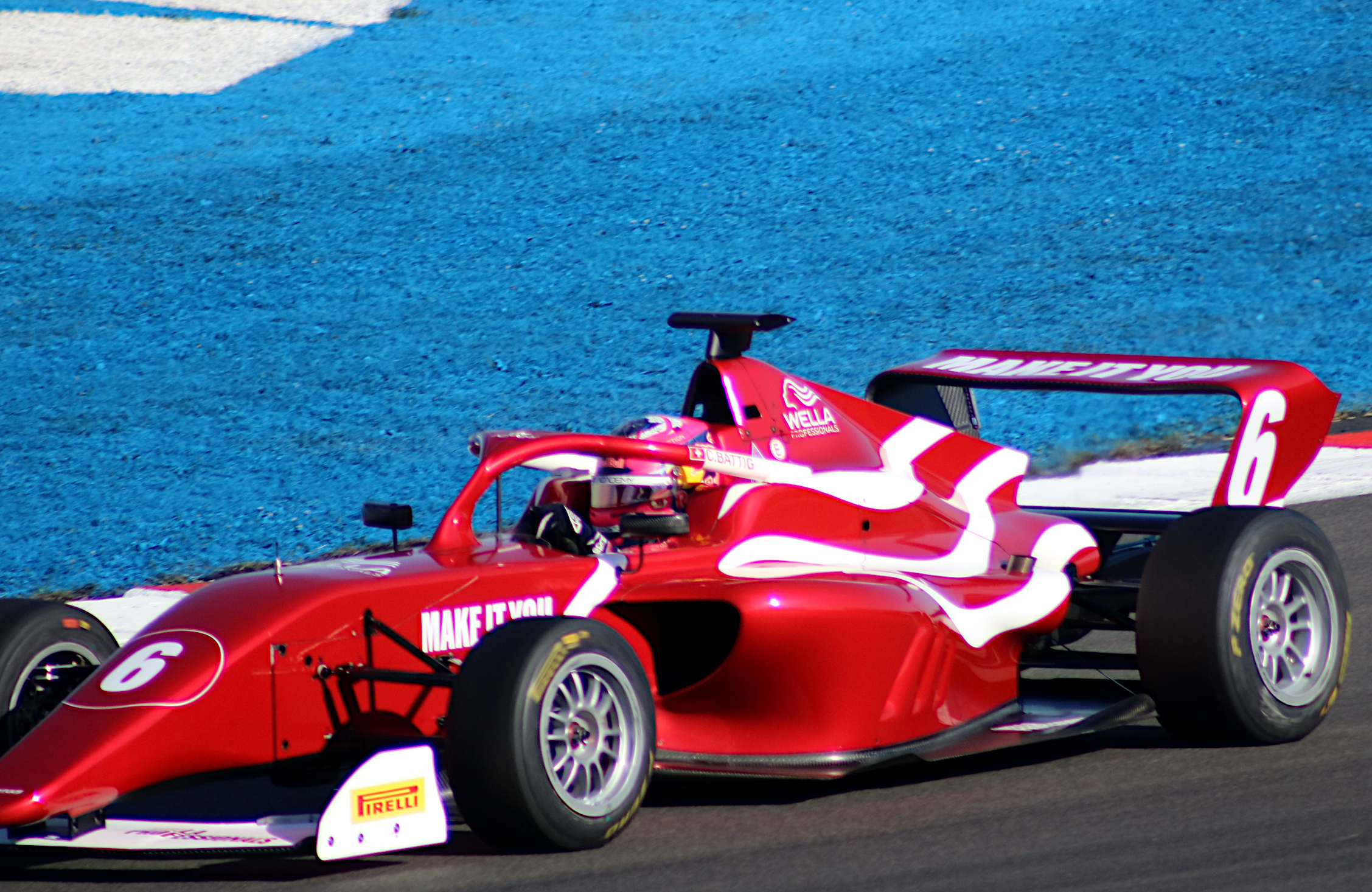
Bättig driving an F1 Academy car during the 2026 British Grand Prix weekend at Silverstone

The following year, Bättig joined Campos Racing to compete in select rounds of the Formula Winter Series, before moving to Hitech TGR for her first full-time campaign in the F4 British Championship. In the former, Bättig opened up the season with her first podium in single-seaters by finishing second in a wet race three at Estoril. Across the following four rounds, Bättig scored only one other points finish, a tenth place in race three at MotorLand Aragón en route to a 17th-place points finish. In British F4, Bättig scored her maiden podium at the first Silverstone round, before taking her second and final podium in the other Silverstone round on her way to 13th in overall points. During 2026, Bättig made her F1 Academy debut at Silverstone as Hitech's wildcard driver, with support from Wella. After becoming the first wildcard driver in series history to qualify on pole position, Bättig finished second in the main race behind Alisha Palmowski.

=== Formula One ===
In August 2025, Bättig joined the Red Bull Junior Team, after entering their Driver Search programme during the summer.

== Karting record ==
=== Karting career summary ===
Season	Series	Team	Position
2018	Trofeo Vega — Mini		10th
2019	Swiss Championship — Super Mini	Spirit-Racing.ch	18th
2019	Trofeo Vega — Mini		2nd
2019	IAME International Final — X30 Mini		21st
2021	IAME Euro Series — X30 Mini	Spirit-Racing.ch	83rd
2022	WSK Super Master Series — OK-J	KartBox.ch	95th
2022	IAME Warriors Final — X30 Junior	KartBox.ch	NC
2022	Swiss Championship — OK-J	KartBox.ch	1st
2022	CIK-FIA Academy Trophy	Natascha Kessler	43rd
2022	WSK Euro Series — OK-J	KR Motorsport	48th
2023	WSK Super Master Series — OK-J	IPK Factory Team	34th
2023	Andrea Margutti Trophy — X30 Junior	IPK Factory Team	15th
2023	WSK Open Series — X30 Junior	IPK Factory Team	9th
2023	WSK Open Series — X30 Junior	Kidix Driver Performance (Note: Bättig competed for IPK Factory Team in round one and for Kidix Driver Performance in round three.)	9th
2023	Champions of the Future — OK-J	DPK Racing	45th
2023	CIK-FIA European Championship — OK-J	DPK Racing	NC†
2023	WSK Euro Series — OK-J	DPK Racing	37th
2023	CIK-FIA World Championship — OK-J	DPK Racing	79th
2023	Swiss Championship — OK-J	DPK Racing	1st
2024	WSK Super Master Series — OK-J	DPK Racing	35th
2024	Champions of the Future — OK-J	DPK Racing	66th
2024	Swiss Championship — OK-J	KartBox.ch	1st
2024	IAME Euro Series — X30 Junior	KartBox.ch	37th
2024	WSK Final Cup — OK-N	VictoryLane	25th
2024	WSK Final Cup — OK	VictoryLane	10th
2024	IAME Warriors Final — X30 Senior	VictoryLane	NC
2024	FIA Motorsport Games — Junior	Team Switzerland	DNF
2025	WSK Super Master Series — OK	VictoryLane	45th
2025	Champions of the Future — OK	VictoryLane	29th
2025	CIK-FIA European Championship — OK	VictoryLane	15th
2025	CIK-FIA World Championship — OK	VictoryLane	57th
2025	Champions of the Future — OK-N		2nd
Source: (Note: Additional references are stated in § Karting (2018–2025).)

^{†} As Bättig was a guest driver, she was ineligible for championship points.

=== Complete CIK-FIA results ===
==== Complete CIK-FIA World Championship results ====
Year	Entrant	Class	Circuit	QH	SH	F
2023	DPK Racing	OK-J	(Italy) Franciacorta	79th	DNQ	DNPQ
2025	VictoryLane	OK	(Sweden) Kristianstad	58th	57th	DNQ

==== Complete CIK-FIA European Championship results ====
(key) (Races in bold indicate pole position; races in italics indicate fastest lap)

Year	Entrant	Class	1	2	3	4	5	6	7	8	9	10	11	12	Pos	Points
2023	DPK Racing	OK-J	VAL; QH	VAL; SH	VAL; F	TŘI; QH	TŘI; SH	TŘI; F	RØD; QH	RØD; SH	RØD; F	CRE; QH; 29	CRE; SH; 26	CRE; F 19	NC†	—
2025	VictoryLane	OK	**CAM**; **QH**; 1	**CAM**; **SH**; 8	CAM; F 5	POR; QH; 27	POR; SH; 24	POR; F 24	VIT; QH; 64	VIT; SH; 67	VIT; F DNQ	RØD; QH; 52	RØD; SH; 51	RØD; F DNQ	15th	64

^{†} As Bättig was a guest driver, she was ineligible for championship points.

== Racing record ==
=== Racing career summary ===
Season	Series	Team	Races	Wins	Poles	F/Laps	Podiums	Points	Position
2025	F4 Saudi Arabian Championship	Red Bull	10	0	0	0	0	22	12th
2026	Formula Winter Series	Campos Racing	15	0	0	0	1	19	17th
2026	F4 British Championship	Hitech	30	0	0	1	2	102	13th
2026	F1 Academy	Hitech	2	0	1	0	1	22	14th

* Season still in progress.

=== Complete F4 Saudi Arabian Championship results ===
(key) (Races in bold indicate pole position; races in italics indicate fastest lap)

Year	Entrant	1	2	3	4	5	6	7	8	9	10	Pos	Points
2025	Red Bull	BHR1; 1; 8	BHR1; 2 Ret	BHR2; 1 Ret	BHR2; 2; 9	JED1; 1; 7	JED1; 2; 8	JED2; 1; 11	JED2; 2; 9	JED3; 1; 8	JED3; 2 Ret	12th	22

=== Complete Formula Winter Series results ===
(key) (Races in bold indicate pole position; races in italics indicate fastest lap)

Year	Entrant	1	2	3	4	5	6	7	8	9	10	11	12	13	14	15	Pos	Points
2026	Campos Racing	EST; 1; 16	EST; 2; 17	EST; 3; 2	POR; 1; 21	POR; 2; 26	POR; 3; 21	CRT; 1; 16	CRT; 2; 21	CRT; 3; 25	ARA; 1; 16	ARA; 2; 12	ARA; 3; 10	CAT; 1; 21	CAT; 2; 11	CAT; 3; 14	17th	19

=== Complete F4 British Championship results ===
(key) (Races in bold indicate pole position; races in italics indicate fastest lap; ^{superscript} indicates points for positions gained)

Year	Entrant	1	2	3	4	5	6	7	8	9	10	11	12	13	14	15	16	17	18	19	20	21	22	23	24	25	26	27	28	29	30	Pos	Points
2026	Hitech	DPN; 1; 14	DPN; 2; 18^{4}	DPN; 3; 13	BHI; 1; 17	BHI; 2; 20^{10}	BHI; 3; 6	SNE; 1; 17	SNE; 2; 14^{5}	SNE; 3; 14	SILGP; 1; 9	SILGP; 2; 3	SILGP; 3; 19	ZAN; 1; 16	ZAN; 2; 15^{5}	ZAN; 3; 14	THR; 1; 13	THR; 2; 8^{6}	THR; 3; 9	DPGP; 1; 17	DPGP; 2; 13	DPGP; 3; 10	CRO; 1; 4	CRO; 2; 18	CRO; 3; 4	SILN; 1; 5	SILN; 2; 3^{1}	SILN; 3 Ret	BHGP; 1; 10	BHGP; 2; 8	BHGP; 3; 6	13th	102

=== Complete F1 Academy results ===
(key) (Races in bold indicate pole position; races in italics indicate points for the fastest lap of the points finishers)

Year	Entrant	1	2	3	4	5	6	7	8	9	10	11	12	13	14	Pos	Points
2026	Hitech	SHA; 1	SHA; 2	MTL; 1	MTL; 2	MTL; 3	SIL; 1; 8	**SIL**; **2**; 2	ZAN; 1	ZAN; 2	COA; 1	COA; 2	COA; 3	LVG; 1	LVG; 2	11th*	22*

* Season still in progress.
