= Ella Stevens (racing driver) =

British racing driver (born 2006)

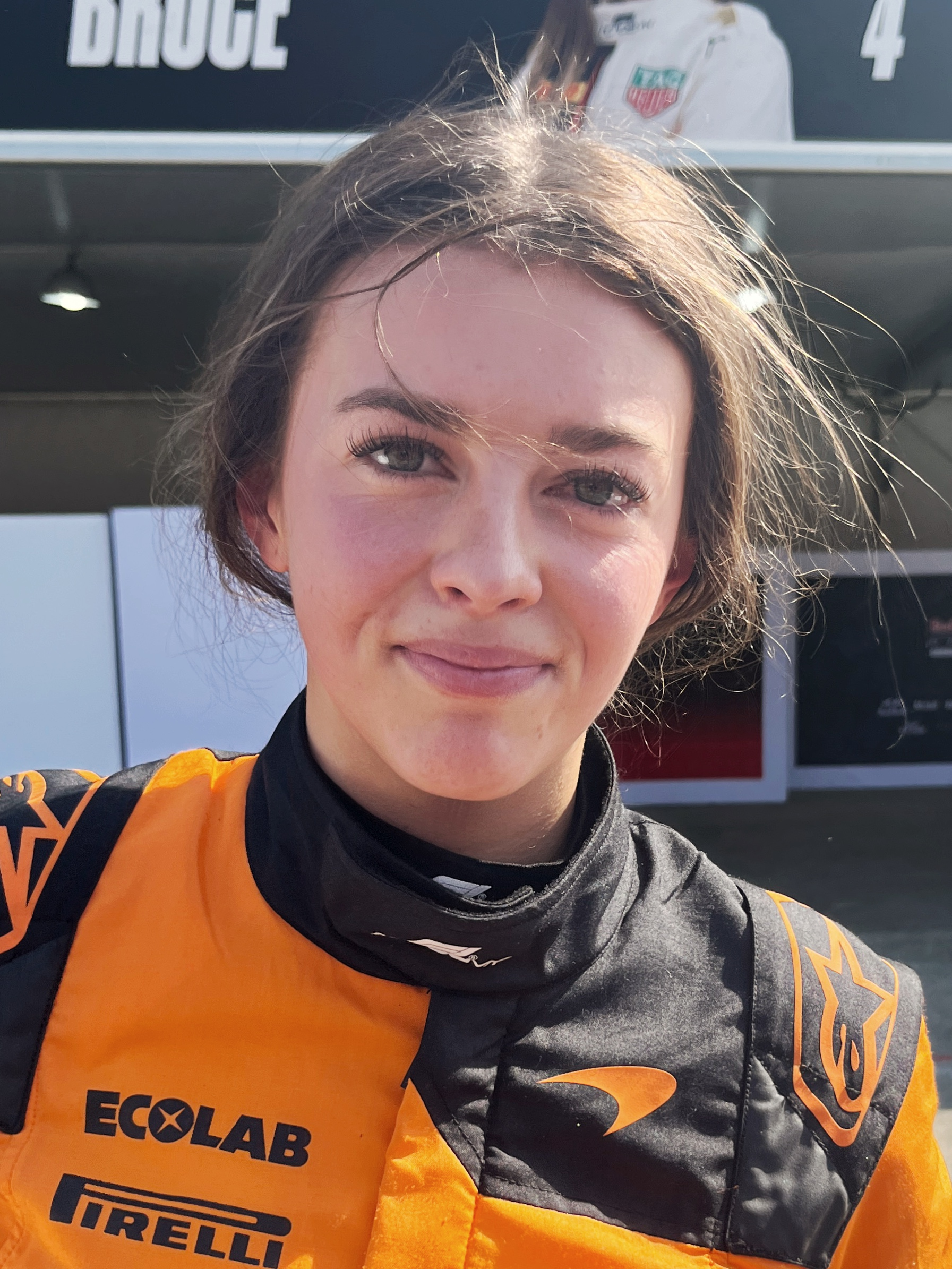
- Stevens at the 2026 Chinese Grand Prix
- Nationality: (United Kingdom) British
- Born: 10 September 2006 (age 20) Wotton-under-Edge, England

F1 Academy career
- Debut season: 2026
- Current team: Rodin Motorsport
- Car number: 28
- Starts: 12
- Wins: 0
- Podiums: 0
- Poles: 0
- Fastest laps: 0
- Best finish: TBD in 2026
- Statistics up to date as of 13 November 2026.

Ella Stevens (born 10 September 2006) is a British racing driver who competes in F1 Academy for Rodin Motorsport as part of the McLaren Driver Development Programme with support from McLaren Oxagon.

== Career ==
=== Karting ===
Born in Wotton-under-Edge, Stevens began karting at the age of six, competing until 2025. Starting out in Bambino karts, Stevens moved to Cadet karts in 2016 as she joined the BirelART UK Series, which she won the following year, before taking the LGM Series privateer title in 2018. She then stepped up to Mini karts in 2020, winning the TVKC Winter Series, as she joined Rob Smedley's Electroheads Talent Academy, and also participated in the inaugural edition of the FIA Girls on Track – Rising Stars.

After racing in International karting for Birel ART Racing in OK across the following two years, and participating in the 2021 FIA Girls on Track – Rising Stars's Senior category, Stevens returned to the UK with Jade Racing Team to race in KZ2. In her three-year stint in the category, Stevens won the Shenington Kart Racing Club in 2024 and 2025, as well as finishing runner-up in the British Kart Championship in the latter year.

=== Formula 4 ===
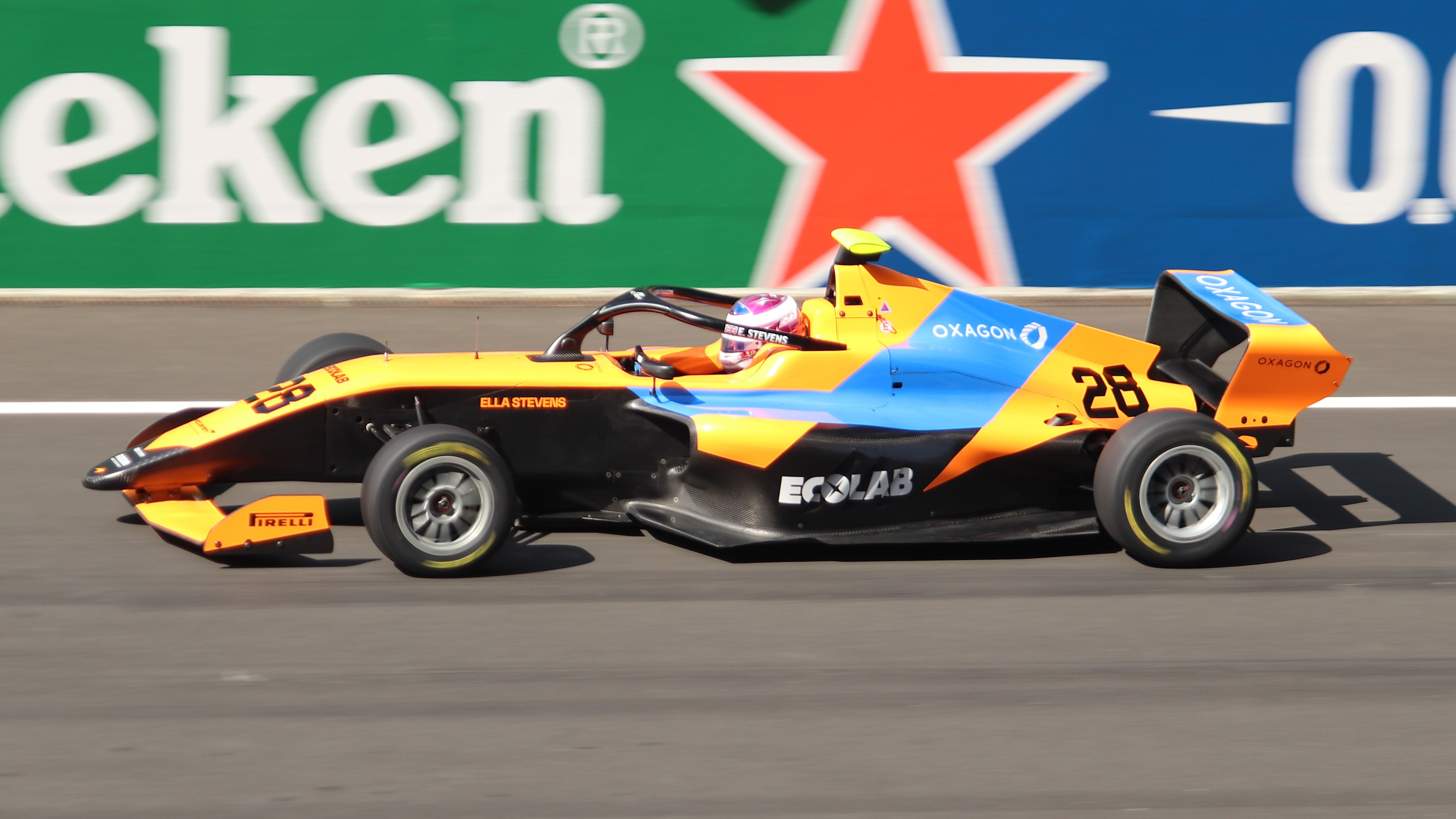
Stevens driving at the 2026 F1 Academy Shanghai round

During 2025, Stevens participated in the F1 Academy rookie test at Navarra, setting the fastest time in the morning before posting the second-fastest time in the afternoon. Later that year, Stevens joined the McLaren Driver Development Programme and it was announced that she would compete in the 2026 F1 Academy season for Rodin Motorsport with support from McLaren Oxagon. After making her single-seater debut in the Algarve round of the Formula Winter Series, Stevens headed to Shanghai for her F1 Academy debut, in which she took a best result of 11th in race one.

== Karting record ==
=== Karting career summary ===
Season	Series	Team	Position
2018	LGM Series – IAME Cadet		16th
2018	Shenington Kart Racing Club – IAME Cadet		22nd
2018	Super One Series – IAME Cadet	Privateer	16th
2019	LGM Series – IAME Cadet		10th
2019	British Kart Championship – IAME Cadet	Fusion Motorsport	13th
2019	Kartmasters British GP – IAME Cadet	Fusion Motorsport	13th
2020	Kartmasters British GP – X30 Mini		NC
2021	LGM Series – X30 Junior	Jade Racing Team	13th
2021	British Kart Championship – X30 Junior	IPK Racing UK	38th
2021	Champions of the Future – OK	Birel ART Racing Team	86th
2021	Karting European Championship – OK	Birel ART Racing Team	NC
2021	Karting World Championship – OK	Birel ART Racing Team	NC
2022	WSK Super Master Series – OK	Birel ART Racing Team	44th
2022	Champions of the Future – OK	Birel ART Racing Team	48th
2022	Karting European Championship – OK	Birel ART Racing Team	69th
2022	Karting World Championship – OK	Birel ART Racing Team	NC
2022	LGM Series – X30 Junior	Jade Racing Team	44th
2023	British Kart Championship – KZ2	Jade Racing Team	5th
2023	Shenington Kart Racing Club – KZ2		2nd
2024	British Kart Championship – KZ2	Jade Racing Team	3rd
2024	Kartmasters British GP – X30 Senior	Jade Racing Team	11th
2024	Shenington Kart Racing Club – KZ2		1st
2025	British Kart Championship – KZ2	Jade Racing Team	2nd
2025	Shenington Kart Racing Club – KZ2		1st
2026	Shenington Kart Racing Club – KZ2		NC†

== Racing record ==
=== Racing career summary ===
Season	Series	Team	Races	Wins	Poles	F/Laps	Podiums	Points	Position
2026	Formula Winter Series	Rodin Motorsport	3	0	0	0	0	0	44th
2026	F1 Academy	Rodin Motorsport	14	0	0	0	0	10	19th

=== Complete Formula Winter Series results ===
(key) (Races in bold indicate pole position; races in italics indicate fastest lap)

Year	Entrant	1	2	3	4	5	6	7	8	9	10	11	12	13	14	15	DC	Points
2026	Rodin Motorsport	EST; 1	EST; 2	EST; 3	POR; 1; 26	POR; 2; 28	POR; 3; 25	CRT; 1	CRT; 2	CRT; 3	ARA; 1	ARA; 2	ARA; 3	CAT; 1	CAT; 2	CAT; 3	44th	0

=== Complete F1 Academy results ===
(key) (Races in bold indicate pole position; races in italics indicate fastest lap)

Year	Entrant	1	2	3	4	5	6	7	8	9	10	11	12	13	14	DC	Points
2026	Rodin Motorsport	SHA; 1; 11	SHA; 2; 12	MTL; 1; 8	MTL; 2; 15	MTL; 3; 11	SIL; 1; 13	SIL; 2 Ret	ZAN; 1; 16	ZAN; 2; 14	COA; 1; 9	COA; 2; 12	COA; 3; 11	LVG; 1	LVG; 2	13th*	4*
