= Alba Hurup Larsen =

Danish racing driver (born 2008)

- Larsen at the 2026 Dutch Grand Prix
- Nationality: (Denmark) Danish
- Born: Alba Sophia Hurup Larsen; 12 December 2008 (age 17) Roskilde, Zealand, Denmark

F1 Academy career
- Debut season: 2025
- Current team: MP Motorsport
- Car number: 12
- Starts: 26
- Wins: 1
- Podiums: 4
- Poles: 0
- Fastest laps: 4
- Best finish: 7th in 2025

Previous series
- 2025; 2024: Formula Winter Series; F4 Indian
- Statistics up to date as of 13 November 2026.

Alba Sophia Hurup Larsen (born 12 December 2008) is a Danish racing driver who competes in F1 Academy for MP Motorsport as part of the Ferrari Driver Academy.

== Early career ==
=== Karting ===
Larsen started karting in 2020, mainly racing in IAME-run series until 2024. During her time in karting, she most notably won the 2023 Zealand Karting Championship in the Dasu junior class. During 2023, Larsen also became the winner of the FIA Girls on Track – Rising Stars programme's senior category. Also around this time she started getting mentored by then-Haas Formula One driver Kevin Magnussen.

=== Formula 4 ===
==== 2024 ====
Larsen made her single-seater debut at the end of 2024, racing in the F4 Indian Championship for MP Motorsport-run Speed Demons Delhi. Racing in only the first two rounds of the season, Larsen scored a best result of sixth in race one at Chennai.

==== 2025 ====
In early 2025, Larsen signed with Jenzer Motorsport to compete in the Formula Winter Series. In the first round of the season at Algarve, Larsen finished 15th in the first two races and stayed out of trouble during a damp race three to finish 19th. After a difficult weekend at Valencia where she could only muster a best result of 21st, Larsen improved her best result of the season by taking 14th in race one at Aragon in what would turn out to be her final round in the series as she focused on F1 Academy pre-season testing.

On 7 April 2025, it was announced that Larsen would compete on a part-time basis in the F4 British Championship for Chris Dittmann Racing. Racing in the season-opening round at Donington Park's national layout, Larsen finished 15th and 14th in the first two races and capped off the weekend by finishing 16th and leaving the round fourth in the Challenge Cup standings.

==== 2026 ====
The following year, Larsen joined Evans GP to race in the UAE4 Series, in which she scored a best result of tenth in race three of the first Yas Marina round. Alongside her second campaign in F1 Academy, Larsen returned to the F4 British Championship with Chris Dittmann Racing, in which she scored a lone podium in the reverse-grid race at Zandvoort.

=== F1 Academy ===
==== 2025 ====
In late 2024, it was announced that Larsen would race in F1 Academy for MP Motorsport with support from Tommy Hilfiger. Qualifying third on debut in Shanghai, Larsen finished fourth on track in the reverse-grid sprint race, but was later penalized for an earlier collision with Emma Felbermayr and thus dropped to seventh. In the feature race, Larsen ran third for most of it but was passed by Chloe Chambers in the closing stages and dropped to fourth as the race ended. In the following round at Jeddah, Larsen finished fifth in both races. At Miami, Larsen finished 11th in the sprint race after starting from the pit lane, in what turned out to be the round's sole race as the feature race was cancelled due to adverse conditions. Larsen then scored points all but three times and matched her season-best result of fourth at Las Vegas to end the season seventh overall.

==== 2026 ====
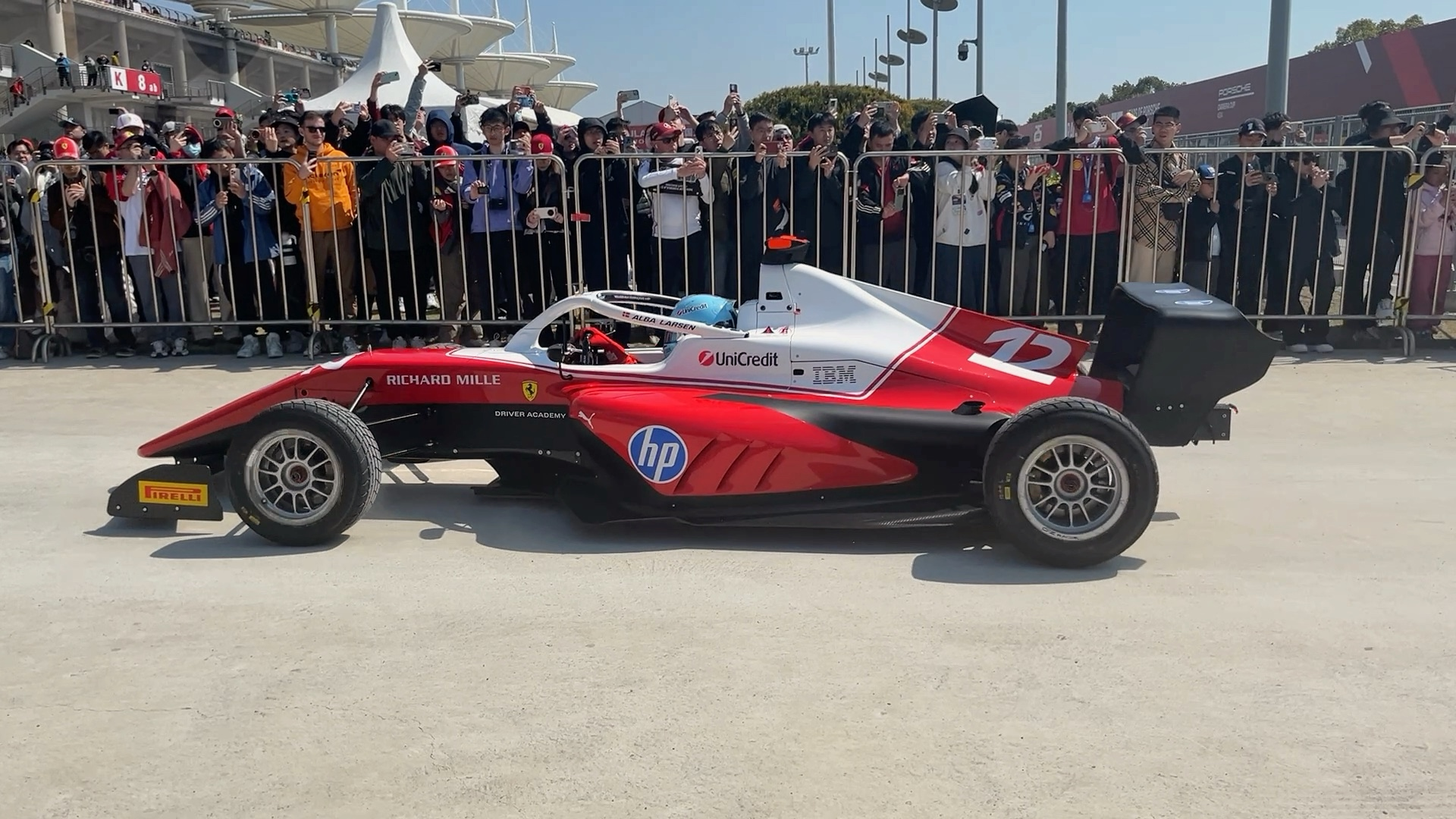
Larsen at the 2026 F1 Academy Shanghai round

MP Motosport retained Larsen as the Ferrari–backed driver in F1 Academy, where she replaced 2025 title runner-up and former teammate Maya Weug. After taking a best result of eighth at Shanghai, Larsen initially claimed her maiden podium by finishing in third in the reverse-grid race at Montreal, but was later demoted to 11th after receiving a five-second post-race penalty. Larsen took her first podiums at the Zandvoort round by finishing second in both races, before finishing third in race one at Circuit of the Americas and then taking her maiden series win in the reverse-grid race two.

==== 2027 ====
Larsen is set to continue with Ferrari in 2027, becoming the first confirmed driver to commit to a third season in the category following regulation changes.

=== Formula One ===
Larsen joined the Ferrari Driver Academy in August 2025.

== Personal life ==
She was born in Roskilde, Denmark. She is mentored by former Formula One driver Kevin Magnussen. Larsen was the winner of the 2025 FIA Women in Motorsport Award for her work in advancing the inclusion of women in motorsport through her Girls International Racing Lab (G.I.R.L.) initiative.

== Racing record ==
=== Racing career summary ===
Season	Series	Team	Races	Wins	Poles	F/Laps	Podiums	Points	Position
2024	F4 Indian Championship	Speed Demons Delhi	5	0	0	0	0	13	18th
2025	Formula Winter Series	Jenzer Motorsport	9	0	0	0	0	0	32nd
2025	F1 Academy	MP Motorsport	14	0	0	0	0	70	7th
2025	F4 British Championship	Chris Dittmann Racing	21	0	0	0	0	27	23rd
2026	UAE4 Series	Evans GP	9	0	0	0	0	1	22nd
2026	F1 Academy	MP Motorsport	14	2	0	4	6	104	4th
2026	F4 British Championship	Chris Dittmann Racing	6	0	0	0	1	9	32nd
2027	F1 Academy								

* Season still in progress.

=== Complete F4 Indian Championship results ===
(key) (Races in bold indicate pole position) (Races in italics indicate fastest lap)

Year	Entrant	1	2	3	4	5	6	7	8	9	10	11	12	13	14	15	Pos	Points
2024	Speed Demons Delhi	MAD1; 1; 13	MAD1; 2; 11	MAD1; 3; 10	CHE; 1; 6	CHE; 2; 8	MAD2; 1	MAD2; 2	MAD2; 3	MAD2; 4	KAR1; 1	KAR1; 2	KAR1; 3	KAR2; 1	KAR2; 2	KAR2; 3	18th	13

=== Complete Formula Winter Series results ===
(key) (Races in bold indicate pole position) (Races in italics indicate fastest lap)

Year	Team	1	2	3	4	5	6	7	8	9	10	11	12	DC	Points
2025	Jenzer Motorsport	POR; 1; 15	POR; 2; 15	POR; 3; 19	CRT; 1 Ret	CRT; 2; 30†	CRT; 3; 21	ARA; 1; 14	ARA; 2; 21	ARA; 3; 17	CAT; 1	CAT; 2	CAT; 3	32nd	0

=== Complete F1 Academy results ===
(key) (Races in bold indicate pole position; races in italics indicate fastest lap)

Year	Team	1	2	3	4	5	6	7	8	9	10	11	12	13	14	15	DC	Points
2025	MP Motorsport	SHA; 1; 7	SHA; 2; 4	JED; 1; 5	JED; 2; 5	MIA; 1; 11	MIA; 2 C	MTL; 1; 5	MTL; 2; 5	MTL; 3; 8	ZAN; 1; 17	ZAN; 2; 9	SIN; 1; 14	SIN; 2; 5	LVG; 1 Ret	LVG; 2; 4	7th	70
2026	MP Motorsport	SHA; 1; 18	SHA; 2; 8	MTL; 1; 5	MTL; 2; 11	MTL; 3; 6	SIL; 1; 10	SIL; 2; 10	ZAN; 1; 2	ZAN; 2; 2	COA; 1; 3	COA; 2; 1	COA; 3 Ret	LVG; 1	LVG; 2		4th*	76*

* Season still in progress.

=== Complete F4 British Championship results ===
(key) (Races in bold indicate pole position) (Races in italics indicate fastest lap)

Year	Team	1	2	3	4	5	6	7	8	9	10	11	12	13	14	15	16	17	18	19	20	21	22	23	24	25	26	27	28	29	30	31	32	DC	Points
2025	Chris Dittmann Racing	DPN; 1; 15	DPN; 2; 14^{6}	DPN; 3; 16	SILGP; 1	SILGP; 2	SILGP; 3	SNE; 1; 16	SNE; 2; 22	SNE; 3; 16	THR; 1; 11	THR; 2; 17^{5}	THR; 3; 18	OUL; 1; 14	OUL; 2; 16^{4}	OUL; 3; 15	SILGP; 1	SILGP; 2	ZAN; 1; 14	ZAN; 2; 18^{5}	ZAN; 3; 18	KNO; 1; 20	KNO; 2 Ret	KNO; 3; 15	DPGP; 1	DPGP; 2	DPGP; 3	SILN; 1; 11	SILN; 2; 14^{7}	SILN; 3 Ret	BHGP; 1	BHGP; 2	BHGP; 3	23rd	27
2026	Chris Dittmann Racing	DPN; 1	DPN; 2	DPN; 3	BHI; 1	BHI; 2	BHI; 3	SNE; 1	SNE; 2	SNE; 3	SILGP; 1; 15	SILGP; 2; 21^{2}	SILGP; 3; 26	ZAN; 1; 29	ZAN; 2; 3^{1}	ZAN; 3; 15	THR; 1	THR; 2	THR; 3	DPGP; 1	DPGP; 2	DPGP; 3	CRO; 1	CRO; 2	CRO; 3	SILN; 1	SILN; 2	SILN; 3	BHGP; 1	BHGP; 2	BHGP; 3			32nd	9

=== Complete UAE4 Series results ===
(key) (Races in bold indicate pole position; races in italics indicate fastest lap)

Year	Team	1	2	3	4	5	6	7	8	9	10	11	12	DC	Points
2026	Evans GP	YMC1; 1; 13	YMC1; 2; 19	YMC1; 3; 10	YMC2; 1; 14	YMC2; 2; 29	YMC2; 3; 20	DUB; 1; 13	DUB; 2; 26	DUB; 3; 14	LUS; 1	LUS; 2	LUS; 3	22nd	1
