= Mathilda Paatz =

German racing driver (born 2008)

- Paatz at the Circuit Zandvoort in 2026
- Nationality: German
- Born: 1 August 2008 (age 18) Cologne, North Rhine-Westphalia

F1 Academy career
- Debut season: 2025
- Current team: Prema Racing
- Car number: 8
- Former teams: Hitech TGR
- Starts: 15
- Wins: 1
- Podiums: 2
- Poles: 0
- Fastest laps: 0
- Best finish: 21st in 2025
- Statistics up to date as of 13 November 2026.

Formula 4 CEZ Championship career
- Current team: Mathilda Racing
- Starts: 18
- Wins: 0
- Podiums: 1
- Poles: 0
- Fastest laps: 0
- Best finish: 8th in 2024

Previous series
- 2025; 2025; 2024: Italian F4; E4; French F4

Mathilda Paatz (born 1 August 2008) is a German racing driver who competes in the Formula 4 CEZ Championship for Mathilda Racing and F1 Academy for Prema Racing with support from Aston Martin.

== Racing career ==
=== Karting ===
Paatz competed in the 2022 FIA Motorsport Games, where she placed 13th in the Junior Karting Sprint Cup.

Paatz was a finalist in the Junior category of the 2022 Girls on Track – Rising Stars program. In 2023, she was a Senior finalist.

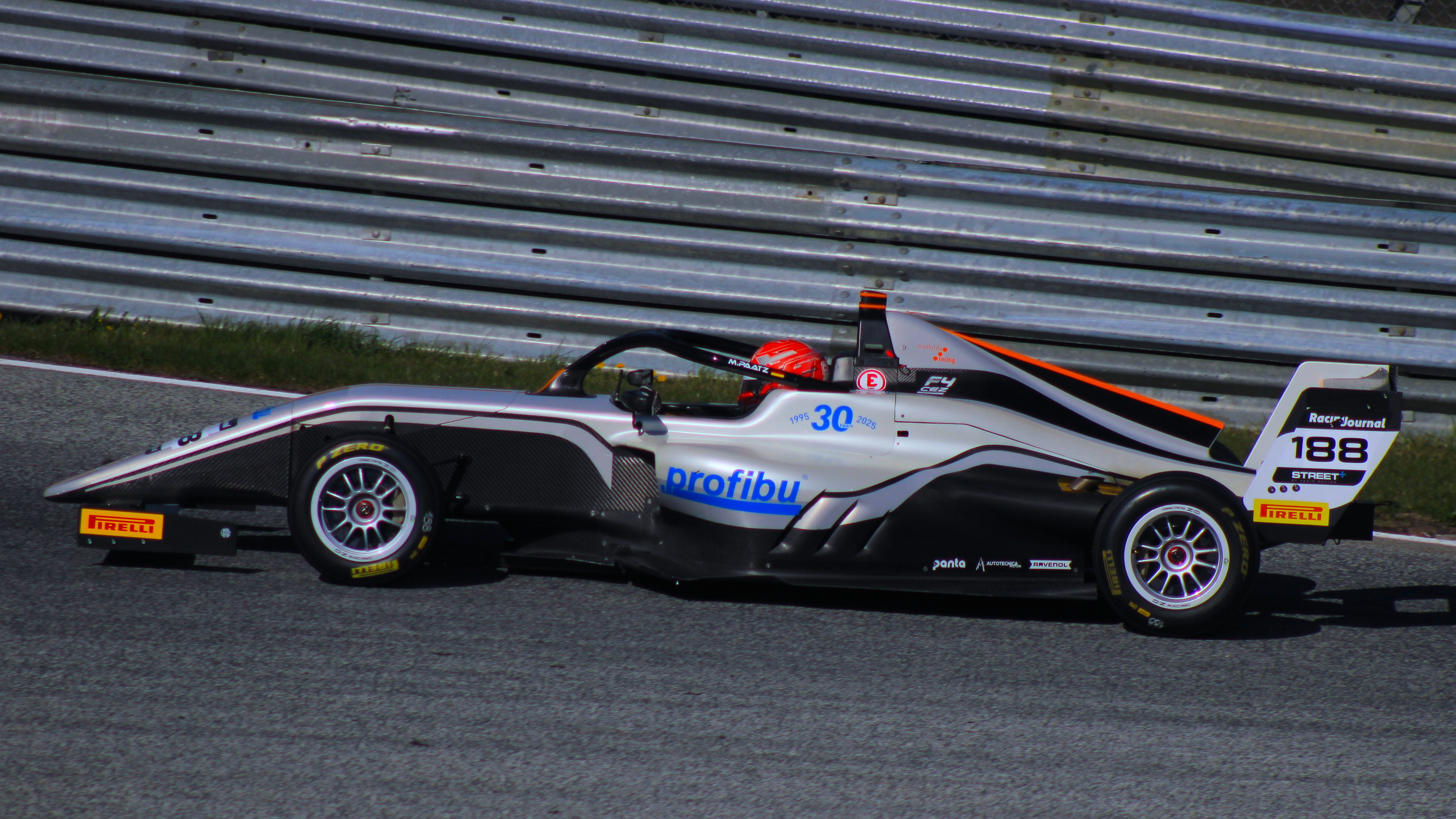
Paatz in 2025 at a F4 CEZ event held at Red Bull Ring.

=== Single-seaters ===
In 2024, Paatz became the first female driver supported by the ADAC junior team. She competed in the French F4 Championship, achieving a best result of tenth and finishing the season in 20th place.

For 2025, Paatz participated in F4 CEZ with her father's team, achieving her first podium at the Red Bull Ring. She was later announced as a wildcard Gatorade-supported entry for the Montreal round of the 2025 F1 Academy season.

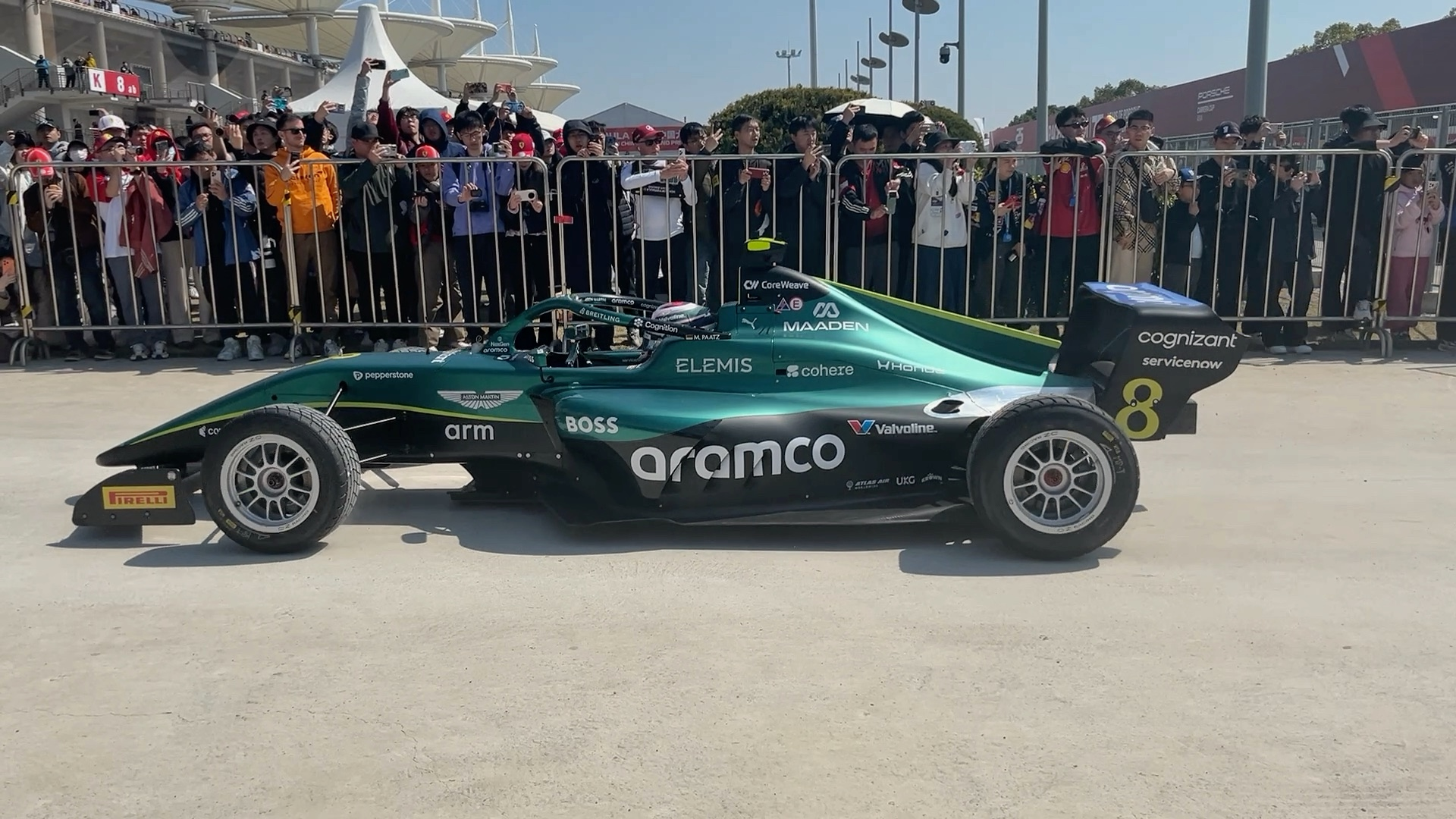
Paatz driving at the 2026 F1 Academy Shanghai round

Paatz entered the 2026 season of F1 Academy full-time with Prema Racing representing Aston Martin. She claimed her maiden podium by finishing in third and her maiden race victory in the opening race and reverse grid race, respectively, in Round 2 at Montreal.

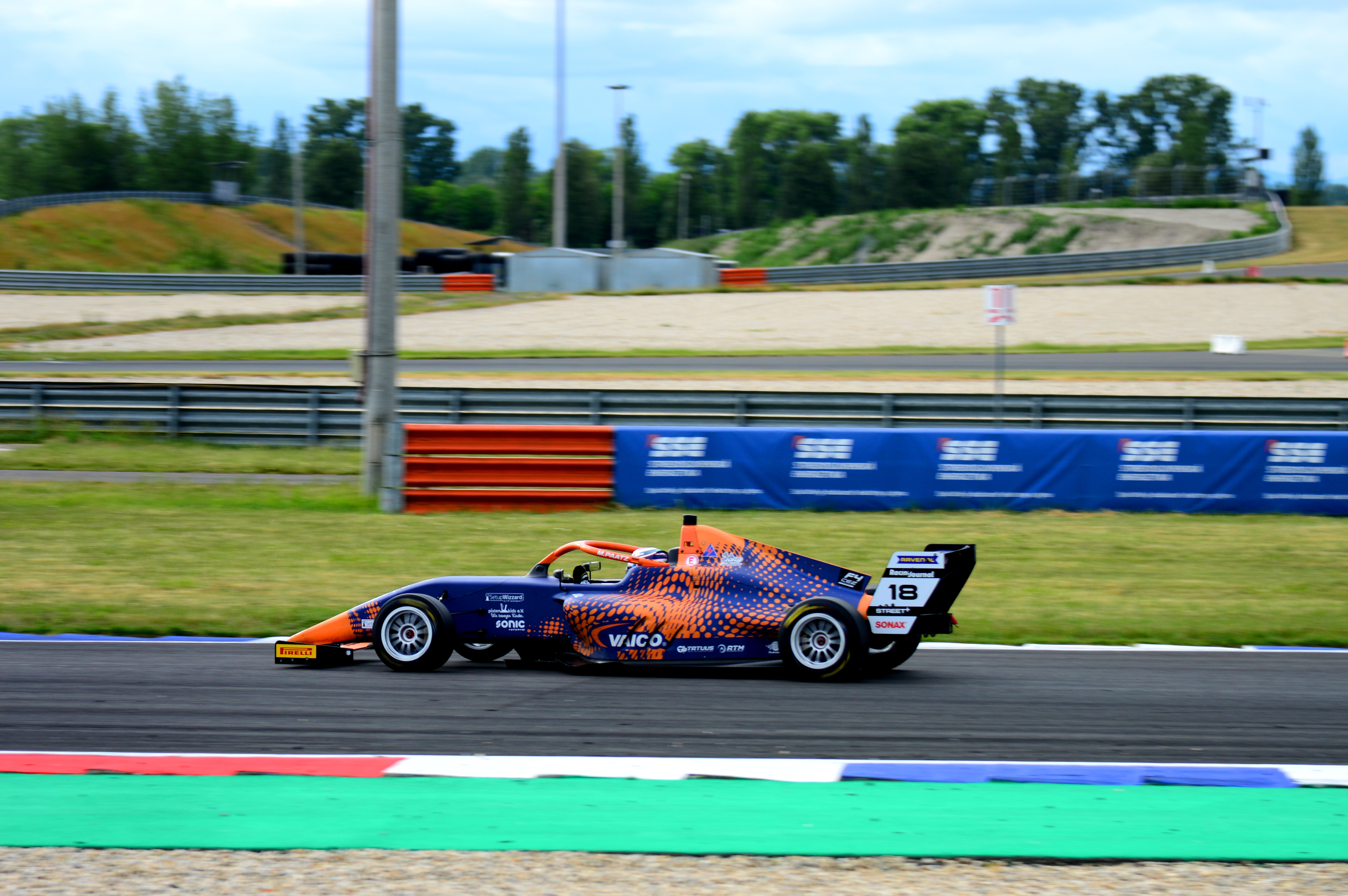
Paatz in 2026 at a F4 CEZ event held at Slovakia Ring.

== Karting record ==
=== Karting career summary ===
Season	Series	Team	Position
2019	ROK Cup Superfinal - Mini ROK	Kerpen E. V. Kart-Club	
2019	ADAC Kart Cup - Bambini	Mathilda Racing	15th
2019	ADAC Kart Masters - Bambini	Mathilda Racing	9th
2020	25° South Garda Winter Cup - Mini ROK	TB Racing Team	
2020	ADAC Kart Masters - Mini	TB Racing Team	3rd
2021	ADAC Kart Masters - OK Junior	TB Racing Team	18th
2022	FIA Motorsport Games - Sprint - Junior	Germany	13th
2022	FIA Karting Academy Trophy		51st
2022	German Kart Championship - OK Junior	TB Racing	17th
2022	ADAC Kart Masters - OK Junior	TB Racing	3rd
2022	ADAC Kart Masters - Ladies Cup	TB Racing	1st
2023	FIA Karting World Championship - OK	DPK Racing	81st
2023	WSK Super Master Series - OK	DPK Racing	57th

== Racing record ==
=== Racing career summary ===
Season	Series	Team	Races	Wins	Poles	F/Laps	Podiums	Points	Position
2024	French F4 Championship	FFSA Academy	20	0	0	0	0	0	20th
2025	Formula Winter Series	AS Motorsport	12	0	0	0	0	0	31st
2025	Italian F4 Championship	AS Motorsport	4	0	0	0	0	0	47th
2025	E4 Championship	AS Motorsport	6	0	0	0	0	0	33rd
2025	Formula 4 CEZ Championship	Mathilda Racing	18	0	0	0	1	94	8th
2025	F1 Academy	Hitech TGR	3	0	0	0	0	0	21st
2026	F1 Academy	Prema Racing	14	1	0	0	2	37	10th
2026	Formula Winter Series	Mathilda Racing	9	0	0	0	1	17	18th
2026	Formula 4 CEZ Championship	Mathilda Racing	14	0	0	0	0	89	12th
2026	Nürburgring Langstrecken-Serie - VT2-FWD+4WD	Mathilda Racing	1	0	0	0	0	0	NC
2026	Italian F4 Championship	Mathilda Racing	3	0	0	0	0	0	58th

* Season still in progress.

=== Complete French F4 Championship results ===
(key) (Races in bold indicate pole position; races in italics indicate fastest lap)

Year	1	2	3	4	5	6	7	8	9	10	11	12	13	14	15	16	17	18	19	20	21	DC	Points
2024	NOG; 1; 19	NOG; 2 C	NOG; 3; 16	LÉD; 1; 21	LÉD; 2; 17	LÉD; 3 NC	SPA; 1; 24†	SPA; 2; 20	SPA; 3; 19	NÜR; 1; 20	NÜR; 2; 22	NÜR; 3; 16	MAG; 1; 12	MAG; 2; 22	MAG; 3; 22†	DIJ; 1 Ret	DIJ; 2; 10	DIJ; 3; 17	LEC; 1 Ret	LEC; 2 Ret	LEC; 3; 25	20th	0

=== Complete Formula Winter Series results ===
(key) (Races in bold indicate pole position) (Races in italics indicate fastest lap)

Year	Team	1	2	3	4	5	6	7	8	9	10	11	12	13	14	15	DC	Points
2025	AS Motorsport	POR; 1; 14	POR; 2 Ret	POR; 3; 18	CRT; 1; 16	CRT; 2; 21	CRT; 3; 18	ARA; 1; 16	ARA; 2; 27	ARA; 3; 26	CAT; 1; 18	CAT; 2; 14	CAT; 3; 26				31st	0
2026	Mathilda Racing	EST; 1; 23	EST; 2; 23	EST; 3; 3	POR; 1; 20	POR; 2; 27	POR; 3; 24	CRT; 1	CRT; 2	CRT; 3	ARA; 1; 20	ARA; 2; 9	ARA; 3; 21	CAT; 1	CAT; 2	CAT; 3	18th	17

=== Complete Formula 4 CEZ Championship results ===
(key) (Races in bold indicate pole position) (Races in italics indicate fastest lap)

Year	Team	1	2	3	4	5	6	7	8	9	10	11	12	13	14	15	16	17	18	19	20	21	22	23	24	DC	Points
2025	Mathilda Racing	RBR1; 1; 13	RBR1; 2 Ret	RBR1; 3; 9	RBR2; 1; 6	RBR2; 2; 7	RBR2; 3; 2	SAL; 1; 8	SAL; 2; 5	SAL; 3; 5	MOS; 1 Ret	MOS; 2; 9	MOS; 3; 11	SVK; 1; 5	SVK; 2; 19	SVK; 3 Ret	BRN; 1; 5	BRN; 2; 7	BRN; 3; 6							8th	94
2026	Mathilda Racing	RBR1; 1; 12	RBR1; 2	RBR1; 3; 7	RBR1; 4; 9	SAL; 1; 8	SAL; 2; 5	SAL; 3	SAL; 4 C	SVK; 1; 14	SVK; 2; 4	SVK; 3	SVK; 4 Ret	MOS; 1; 7	MOS; 2	MOS; 3; 6	MOS; 4 Ret	BRN; 1; 4	BRN; 2	BRN; 3 Ret	BRN; 4; 13	HUN; 1	HUN; 2	HUN; 3	HUN; 4	12th	89

=== Complete E4 Championship results ===
(key) (Races in bold indicate pole position; races in italics indicate fastest lap)

Year	Team	1	2	3	4	5	6	7	8	9	DC	Points
2025	AS Motorsport	LEC; 1	LEC; 2	LEC; 3	MUG; 1 Ret	MUG; 2; 26	MUG; 3; 20	MNZ; 1; 20	MNZ; 2; 15	MNZ; 3; 16	33rd	0

=== Complete Italian F4 Championship results ===
(key) (Races in bold indicate pole position; races in italics indicate fastest lap)

Year	Team	1	2	3	4	5	6	7	8	9	10	11	12	13	14	15	16	17	18	19	20	21	22	23	24	25	26	27	28	DC	Points
2025	AS Motorsport	MIS1; 1	MIS1; 2	MIS1; 3	MIS1; 4	VLL; 1	VLL; 2	VLL; 3	VLL; 4	MNZ; 1	MNZ; 2	MNZ; 3	MUG; 1	MUG; 2	MUG; 3	IMO; 1	IMO; 2	IMO; 3	CAT; 1; 24	CAT; 2; 25	CAT; 3 C	MIS2; 1; 19	MIS2; 2; 22	MIS2; 3	MIS2; 4 DNQ	MIS2; 5				47th	0
2026	Mathilda Racing	MIS1; 1	MIS1; 2	MIS1; 3	MIS1; 4	VLL; 1	VLL; 2	VLL; 3	VLL; 4	MNZ; 1	MNZ; 2	MNZ; 3	MNZ; 4	MUG1; 1	MUG1; 2	MUG1; 3	MUG1; 4	IMO; 1	IMO; 2	IMO; 3	IMO; 4	MIS2; 1	MIS2; 2	MIS2; 3	MIS2; 4	MUG2; 1; 19	MUG2; 2; 23	MUG2; 3	MUG2; 4; 26	58th	0

=== Complete F1 Academy results ===
(key) (Races in bold indicate pole position) (Races in italics indicate fastest lap)

Year	Entrant	1	2	3	4	5	6	7	8	9	10	11	12	13	14	15	DC	Points
2025	Hitech TGR	SHA; 1	SHA; 2	JED; 1	JED; 2	MIA; 1	MIA; 2	MTL; 1 Ret	MTL; 2; 11	MTL; 3 Ret	ZAN; 1	ZAN; 2	SIN; 1	SIN; 2	LVG; 1	LVG; 2	21st	0
2026	Prema Racing	SHA; 1; 14	SHA; 2; 11	MTL; 1; 3	MTL; 2; 1	MTL; 3; 5	SIL; 1; 16	SIL; 2; 12	ZAN; 1; 15	ZAN; 2; 17	COA; 1; 11	COA; 2; 9	COA; 3; 12	LVG; 1	LVG; 2		5th*	35*
