= Natalia Granada =

Spanish racing driver (born 2008)

- Granada at the 2026 Dutch Grand Prix
- Nationality: (Spain) Spanish
- Born: Natalia Granada Ferrero; 18 March 2008 (age 18) La Garriga, Spain

F1 Academy career
- Debut season: 2026
- Current team: Prema Racing
- Categorisation: FIA Silver
- Car number: 19
- Starts: 12
- Wins: 0
- Podiums: 2
- Poles: 0
- Fastest laps: 0
- Best finish: TBD in 2026

Previous series
- 2024: Ligier European Series
- Statistics up to date as of 13 November 2026.

Natalia Granada Ferrero (born 18 March 2008) is a Spanish racing driver competing in F1 Academy for Prema Racing. She is a member of the Iron Dames.

== Career ==
Granada began karting at the age of 11 and soon gained the tutelage of Miguel Molina, competing for his MOL Racing team until 2024. During her karting career, she most notably finished tenth in the International IAME Games in X30 Junior in 2022, and became the first Iron Dames–backed karter when she joined the stable in 2023. Amidst her karting career, Granada made her car racing debut in the 2024 Ligier European Series for Iron Dames by M Racing at Mugello. Racing solo in the JS2 R class as a guest driver, Granada finished seventh in race one before retiring in race two. Towards the end of 2025, Granada participated in F1 Academy's rookie test at Navarra, finishing seventh and eighth in the morning and afternoon sessions.

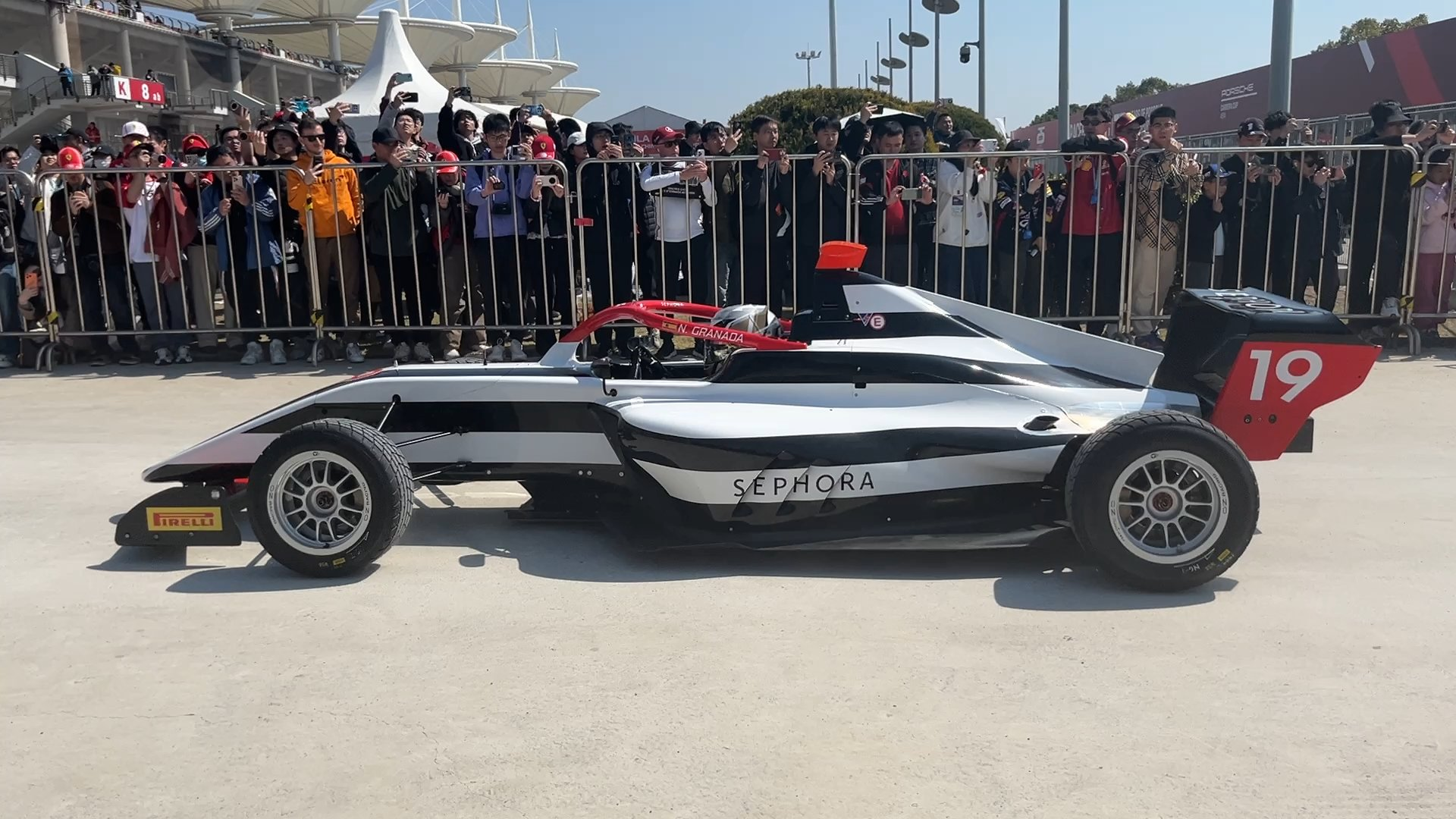
Granada driving at the 2026 F1 Academy Shanghai round.

In 2026, Granada joined Prema Racing to make her single-seater debut in F1 Academy, with backing from Sephora. She secured a podium on debut, finishing second in race one at Shanghai, before finishing fourth at Montreal and seventh at Silverstone.

== Personal life ==
Granada's twin brother, Marc, is also a karting driver for MOL Racing.

== Karting record ==
=== Karting career summary ===
Season	Series	Team	Position
2021	IAME Euro Series — X30 Junior	Kids to Win	79th
2021	International IAME Games — X30 Junior	Kids to Win	29th
2022	IAME Winter Cup — X30 Junior	Kids to Win	12th
2022	IAME Euro Series — X30 Junior	Kids to Win	44th
2022	Italian Karting Championship — X30 Junior		48th
2022	IAME Warriors Final — X30 Junior	Kids to Win	NC
2022	International IAME Games — X30 Junior	Privateer	10th
2022	LeCont Trophy — X30 Senior		19th
2023	IAME Winter Cup — X30 Senior	MOL Racing	32nd
2023	IAME Euro Series — X30 Senior	MOL Racing	63rd
2023	WSK Open Cup — X30 Senior	MOL Racing	15th
2023	IAME Warriors Final — X30 Senior	MOL Racing	NC
2024	IAME Winter Cup — X30 Senior	MOL Racing	NC
2024	IAME Euro Series — X30 Senior	MOL Racing	32nd
2024	Spanish Karting Championship — Senior	MOL Racing	18th

== Racing record ==
=== Racing career summary ===
Season	Series	Team	Races	Wins	Poles	F/Laps	Podiums	Points	Position
2024	Ligier European Series – JS2 R	Iron Dames by M Racing	2	0	0	0	0	0	NC†
2026	F1 Academy	Prema Racing	14	0	0	0	2	59	7th

^{†} As Granada was a guest driver, she was ineligible for championship points.

=== Complete Ligier European Series results ===
(key) (Races in bold indicate pole position; results in italics indicate fastest lap)

Year	Entrant	Class	Chassis	1	2	3	4	5	6	7	8	9	10	11	Rank	Points
2024	Iron Dames by M Racing	JS2 R	Ligier JS2 R	CAT; 1	CAT; 2	LEC; 1	LEC; 2	LMS	SPA; 1	SPA; 2	MUG; 1; 7	MUG; 2 Ret	ALG; 1	ALG; 2	NC†	0†

=== Complete F1 Academy results ===
(key) (Races in bold indicate pole position; races in italics indicate fastest lap)

Year	Team	1	2	3	4	5	6	7	8	9	10	11	12	13	14	D.C.	Points
2026	Prema Racing	SHA; 1; 2	SHA; 2; 14	MTL; 1; 14	MTL; 2; 4	MTL; 3; 8	SIL; 1; 15	SIL; 2; 7	ZAN; 1 Ret	ZAN; 2; 4	COA; 1; 6	COA; 2; 14	COA; 3; 3	LVG; 1	LVG; 2	10th*	23*
