= Rachel Robertson =

British racing driver (born 2007)

- Robertson at the 2026 Dutch Grand Prix
- Nationality: (United Kingdom) British
- Born: Rachel Anne Robertson; 28 July 2007 (age 19) Edinburgh, Scotland

F1 Academy career
- Debut season: 2025
- Current team: Hitech
- Car number: 56
- Former teams: Hitech TGR
- Starts: 14
- Wins: 0
- Podiums: 0
- Poles: 0
- Fastest laps: 0
- Best finish: 16th in 2025

Previous series
- 2025: Radical Cup UK
- Statistics up to date as of 13 November 2026.

Rachel Anne Robertson (born 28 July 2007) is a British racing driver from Scotland who competes in F1 Academy for Hitech with support from Puma.

== Career ==
Robertson began her karting career at the age of fifteen, initially taking up rental karting, before moving to the British Karting Championship in 2024 in the Senior Rotax category. The following year, Robertson joined Radical Racing Rebels to race in the Radical Cup UK. Taking a best result of fourth on her debut round at Donington Park, Robertson then scored a pair of third-place finishes at Brands Hatch and Snetterton. In the final three rounds, she scored two third-place finishes at Silverstone and Donington Park to secure third in points. In August of that year, Robertson tested Formula 4 machinery at Cremona with Cram Motorsport, before participating in the F1 Academy rookie test at Navarra one month later, in which she finished fifth in both sessions.

In October, Robertson made her single-seater debut in the relaunched Hitech Grand Prix centrally-run F4 Saudi Arabian Championship. After retiring in both races of the season-opening round in Bahrain, Robertson scored her maiden series points by finishing tenth in race one of the following round, held at the same venue. In the third round of the season in Jeddah, Robertson scored her second points result of the season, finishing ninth in race two, before bettering that with an eighth place finish at the same venue, in the next round. Robertson then ended the year with a season-best fourth place finish in the following round, as she ended the year 13th in points. In late November, Robertson made her F1 Academy debut for Hitech TGR at Las Vegas, in which she took over Aiva Anagnostiadis' car, and finished fourth on her series debut in a wet race one before ending the weekend with a 14th-place finish in race two.

The following year, Robertson returned to Hitech for her maiden full-time season in F1 Academy, with support from Puma.

== Karting record ==
=== Karting career summary ===
Season	Series	Team	Position
2024	British Kart Championship – Senior Rotax	Guy Cunnington Racing	26th
2024	Motorsport UK 'E' Plate – Senior Rotax	Guy Cunnington Racing	16th
2025	Ultimate Karting Championship – Senior Rotax		51st

== Racing record ==
=== Racing career summary ===
Season	Series	Team	Races	Wins	Poles	F/Laps	Podiums	Points	Position
2025	Radical Cup UK	Radical Racing Rebels	18	0	0	0	4	649	**3rd**
2025	F4 Saudi Arabian Championship	Astop	10	0	0	0	0	19	13th
2025	F1 Academy	Hitech TGR	2	0	0	0	0	5	16th
2026	F1 Academy	Hitech	14	0	0	0	0	28	12th
2026	F4 Saudi Arabian Championship	Zahid						*	*

=== Complete F4 Saudi Arabian Championship results ===
(key) (Races in bold indicate pole position) (Races in italics indicate fastest lap)

Year	Team	1	2	3	4	5	6	7	8	9	10	11	12	DC	Points
2025	Astop	BHR1; 1 Ret	BHR1; 2 Ret	BHR2; 1; 10	BHR2; 2; 13	JED1; 1; 11	JED1; 2; 9	JED2; 1; 12	JED2; 2; 8	JED3; 1 Ret	JED3; 2; 4			13th	19
2026	Zahid	JED1; 1	JED1; 2	JED2; 1; 8	JED2; 2; 9	BHR1; 1	BHR1; 2	BHR2; 1; 9	BHR2; 2; 6	LUS1; 1	LUS1; 2	LUS2; 1	LUS2; 2		

=== Complete F1 Academy results ===
(key) (Races in bold indicate pole position) (Races in italics indicate fastest lap)

Year	Entrant	1	2	3	4	5	6	7	8	9	10	11	12	13	14	15	DC	Points
2025	Hitech TGR	SHA; 1	SHA; 2	JED; 1	JED; 2	MIA; 1	MIA; 2	MTL; 1	MTL; 2	MTL; 3	ZAN; 1	ZAN; 2	SIN; 1	SIN; 2	LVG; 1; 4	LVG; 2; 14	16th	5
2026	Hitech	SHA; 1; 10	SHA; 2; 15†	MTL; 1; 13	MTL; 2 Ret	MTL; 3; 14	SIL; 1; 4	SIL; 2; 6	ZAN; 1; 6	ZAN; 2; 7	COA; 1 Ret	COA; 2; 15	COA; 3; 7	LVG; 1	LVG; 2		14th*	13

† Did not finish, but classified.
