= 2026 F1 Academy season =

Ongoing women's motor racing championship

Alisha Palmowski won the Drivers' Championship.

The 2026 F1 Academy season was the fourth edition of F1 Academy, an all-female, Formula 4–level, open-wheel racing championship founded and organized by Formula Motorsport Limited. For the third year running, it supported selected rounds of the FIA Formula One World Championship. 10 of the 18 cars sport liveries sponsored by 10 of the 11 Formula One teams, with new entrant Cadillac supporting an eleventh F1 Academy livery starting in 2027.

The season's drivers' championship was won by Alisha Palmowski. Her team, Campos Racing, claimed their first teams' championship in the final race of the season, dethroning three-time and defending teams' champion Prema Racing.

== Entries ==
F1 Academy was a spec series; all teams competing with an identical Tatuus F4-T421 chassis and tyre compounds developed by Pirelli. Each car was powered by a 123-kilowatt (165 hp) turbocharged 4-cylinder engine developed by Autotecnica.

Full season entries
Teams	No.	Driver	Supporting F1 team	Rounds	Ref.
(Netherlands) MP Motorsport	3	(Netherlands) Nina Gademan	(France) Alpine	All	
(Netherlands) MP Motorsport	12	(Denmark) Alba Hurup Larsen	(Italy) Ferrari	All	
(Netherlands) MP Motorsport	32	(Netherlands) Esmee Kosterman	—N/a	All	
(Spain) Campos Racing	4	(United Kingdom) Megan Bruce	—N/a	All	
(Spain) Campos Racing	18	(Brazil) Rafaela Ferreira	(Italy) Racing Bulls	All	
(Spain) Campos Racing	21	(United Kingdom) Alisha Palmowski	(Austria) Red Bull Racing	All	
(New Zealand) Rodin Motorsport	5	(Austria) Emma Felbermayr	(Germany) Audi	All	
(New Zealand) Rodin Motorsport	20	(United Kingdom) Ella Lloyd	(United Kingdom) McLaren	All	
(New Zealand) Rodin Motorsport	28	(United Kingdom) Ella Stevens	—N/a (Note: Stevens is a McLaren Driver Development Programme member, but her entry is not directly supported by the F1 team.)	All	
(Italy) Prema Racing	8	(Germany) Mathilda Paatz	(United Kingdom) Aston Martin	All	
(Italy) Prema Racing	9	(United States) Payton Westcott	(Germany) Mercedes	All	
(Italy) Prema Racing	19	(Spain) Natalia Granada	—N/a	All	
(France) ART Grand Prix	14	(France) Lisa Billard	—N/a	All	
(France) ART Grand Prix	91	(United States) Kaylee Countryman	(United States) Haas	All	
(France) ART Grand Prix	95	(France) Jade Jacquet	(United Kingdom) Williams	All	
(United Kingdom) Hitech	55	(United States) Ava Dobson	—N/a	All	
(United Kingdom) Hitech	56	(United Kingdom) Rachel Robertson	—N/a	All	
Wildcard entries
(United Kingdom) Hitech	6	(Switzerland) Chiara Bättig	—N/a (Note: Bättig is a Red Bull Junior Team member, but her entry is not supported by either of the Red Bull–owned teams.)	3	
(United Kingdom) Hitech	10	(Spain) Luna Fluxá	—N/a (Note: Fluxá is a Mercedes Junior Programme member, but her entry is not supported by the F1 team.)	6	
(United Kingdom) Hitech	15	(Romania) Zoe Florescu	—N/a	4	
(United Kingdom) Hitech	24	(China) Shi Wei	—N/a	1	
(United Kingdom) Hitech	45	(Sweden) Alexia Danielsson	—N/a	5	
(United Kingdom) Hitech	77	(Canada) Autumn Fisher	—N/a	2	

=== Driver changes ===
- Prema Racing saw reigning champion Doriane Pin move to European Le Mans Series' LMP2 class with Duqueine Team, Nina Gademan move teams to MP Motorsport, and Tina Hausmann leave the series. Montreal wildcard driver Mathilda Paatz replaced Hausmann as the new Aston Martin-backed driver, while Las Vegas wildcard driver Payton Westcott succeeded Pin in the Mercedes seat. Iron Dames karter Natalia Granada rounded out the lineup with backing from Sephora.
- Joanne Ciconte left the series to compete in Kyojo Cup with KCMG. Alba Hurup Larsen remained with MP Motorsport but switched to Ferrari, taking over from title runner-up Maya Weug. The team signed Alpine Academy driver Nina Gademan, who finished 6th with Prema Racing. Zandvoort wildcard driver Esmee Kosterman will make her full-season debut with MP Motorsport and Lego sponsorship.
- Rodin Motorsport replaced Chloe Chong with new McLaren junior Ella Stevens, backed by McLaren Oxagon. Stevens will be making her single-seater debut after topping the 2025 rookie test.
- ART Grand Prix lost both Lia Block, who returned to rallying, and Aurelia Nobels, who graduated to the GB3 Championship. They replaced them with a pair of French F4 graduates in Singapore wildcard driver Lisa Billard, who retained the support of Gatorade, and Jade Jacquet, who succeeded Block as the Williams-backed driver. 16-year-old Kaylee Countryman moved over from USF Juniors and into the Haas seat, previously occupied by Courtney Crone.
- Hitech will have an all-new line up, as Aiva Anagnostiadis was replaced by her Las Vegas substitute driver Rachel Robertson, who secured Puma sponsorship. Miami wildcard entry Ava Dobson took over from Nicole Havrda as the American Express–supported driver.
- Campos Racing replaced Chloe Chambers with Singapore substitute driver Megan Bruce, who succeeded Anagnostiadis as the TAG Heuer–supported driver.

=== Wildcard entries ===
- Chinese driver Shi Wei returned as the wildcard entry for Round 1 at Shanghai, with the support of Juss Sports.
- Canadian Autumn Fisher was the wildcard entry for Round 2 at Montreal, with the support of Standard Chartered.
- Swiss Chiara Bättig was the wildcard entry for Round 3 at Silverstone, with the support of Wella Professionals.
- Romanian Zoe Florescu was the wildcard entry for Round 4 at Zandvoort, with the support of Unilever brand Dirt Is Good.
- Swede Alexia Danielsson was the wildcard entry for Round 5 at Austin, with the support of TeamViewer.
- Spaniard Luna Fluxá was the wildcard entry for Round 6 at Las Vegas, with the support of Visit Las Vegas.

== Calendar ==
The calendar for the 2026 season was announced on 10 December 2025, and amended on 14 March 2026. All six rounds will support the 2026 Formula One World Championship. A three-race format for Montreal and Austin was used to account for the cancelled round at Jeddah.

Round	Circuit	Opening race	Reverse-grid race	Feature race
1	(China) Shanghai International Circuit, Shanghai	—N/a	14 March	15 March
2	(Canada) Circuit Gilles Villeneuve, Montreal	23 May	23 May	24 May
3	(United Kingdom) Silverstone Circuit, Silverstone	—N/a	4 July	5 July
4	(Netherlands) Circuit Zandvoort, Zandvoort	—N/a	22 August	23 August
5	(United States) Circuit of the Americas, Austin	24 October	24 October	25 October
6	(United States) Las Vegas Strip Circuit, Paradise	—N/a	20 November	21 November

=== Cancelled races ===
Circuit	Reverse-grid race	Feature race
(Saudi Arabia) Jeddah Corniche Circuit, Jeddah	18 April	19 April

=== Calendar changes ===
- The Silverstone Circuit was added to the calendar for the first time and the Circuit of the Americas was reinstated, having previously appeared in the 2023 F1 Academy season. These tracks replaced the Miami International Autodrome and the Marina Bay Street Circuit.
- Round 2 was set to be held at the Jeddah Corniche Circuit but was cancelled due to the 2026 Iran war. An additional opening race was subsequently added to the rounds at Circuit Gilles Villeneuve and Circuit of the Americas.

== Season summary ==
=== Round 1: Shanghai ===
Alisha Palmowski took her maiden pole position at the Shanghai season opener ahead of Alba Larsen. Nina Gademan qualified in eighth place, which gave her the reverse-grid pole for race one.

The reverse-grid race saw Alpine-backed Gademan convert her pole position into an early lead. On lap 7, Ferrari-backed Larsen collided with Audi-backed Emma Felbermayr, which brought out the safety car in order to retrieve debris from Larsen's front wing. Larsen finished in last place after pitting to change her front wing; despite that, she set the fastest lap. On the final lap, Felbermayr overtook Rafaela Ferreira to claim third. Gademan led every lap and won the first race of the 2026 F1 Academy season. Rookie driver Natalia Granada finished in second place, while Felbermayr rounded out the podium.

In the feature race, Red Bull-backed Palmowski had a slow start from pole position, dropping behind Larsen and Felbermayr. Granada sustained front wing damage after she collided with the back of Ferreira in the opening lap. Williams-backed Jade Jacquet locked up and collided with the back of Esmee Kosterman on lap 6, triggering the safety car. At the restart, Larsen had a snap of oversteer through the final corner and ran into the gravel, losing the lead of the race and falling to eighth place. On lap 10, Rachel Robertson collided with wild card driver Shi Wei, leading to a retirement for Wei. Felbermayr held off Palmowski to win, with Mercedes-backed rookie Payton Westcott completing the podium.

=== Round 2: Canada ===
Due to the cancellation of the race weekend in Saudi Arabia, three races were held at the Circuit Gilles Villeneuve. Ahead of the weekend, Emma Felbermayr led the championship standings. Alisha Palmowski dominated qualifying, taking pole position for both the opening race and feature race. Payton Westcott and Megan Bruce qualified second and third for the feature race, and third and second for the opening race.

Palmowski led from pole in the opening race while championship leader Felbermayr stalled on the grid, dropping from fourth to fifteenth place. Natalia Granada spun in the opening lap, making contact with Lisa Billard and damaging the front wing of Billard’s car. On lap 6, Esmee Kosterman pitted due to a puncture and front wing damage from contact with Ava Dobson. Westcott dropped from third to eighth on lap 8 after an off-track excursion; she had to pit a few laps later due to overheating caused by grass stuck in the radiator of her car. Palmowski led every lap of the race for a crushing win, with her Campos teammate Bruce in second and Aston Martin-backed driver Mathilda Paatz in third; both Bruce and Paatz taking their first F1 Academy podiums.

In the reverse-grid race, Rafaela Ferreira started from second place and took the lead from Kaylee Countryman, who started on pole. Felbermayr spun on the opening lap, after making contact with Alba Larsen. Further back, separate incidents saw both Dobson and Rachel Robertson retire from the race with damage, bringing out the safety car. Ferreira led the grid after the safety car restart on lap 6. A concertina effect on lap 13 resulted in Bruce's front wing tapping her teammate Palmowski, and Nina Gademan making contact with the rear of Bruce's car after being left with nowhere to go. The safety car was called; Gademan ultimately retired from the race, while Palmowski finished out of the points and Bruce finished in seventh. Ferreira made another good restart after the safety car came in on lap 16 and crossed the finish line first, however, she was given a five-second time penalty for a false start, which dropped her down to eighth. Paatz, who had passed Countryman for second on the road before the safety car came out, thus won her maiden F1 Academy race, which was also Aston Martin's first victory in the series. Ferrari-backed Larsen finished in third, but was given a post-race penalty for the opening lap contact with Felbermayr, which demoted her to 11th. The final classification had Paatz in first, with Countryman in second and Westcott in third.

Palmowski returned to pole position for the feature race which was held in wet conditions, and kept the lead into turn 1 with a good start. Further down the grid, Ella Lloyd dodged her teammate Ella Stevens, who stalled on the grid. Later in the opening lap, Lloyd collided with the side of Billard, which sent the latter into a spin. Felbermayr took advantage of an error by Westcott on lap 14 to move into third place; she continued her charge and overtook Bruce for second three laps later. Despite reporting an engine problem over the radio on the last lap, Palmowski had built a large enough lead to still finish in first and take her second win of the weekend, 10.9 seconds ahead of Felbermayr in second and Bruce in third. This was the largest winning margin in F1 Academy history, breaking Palmowski's own record from the opening race. Palmowski left the weekend as the championship leader, 25 points ahead of Felbermayr.

=== Round 3: Silverstone ===
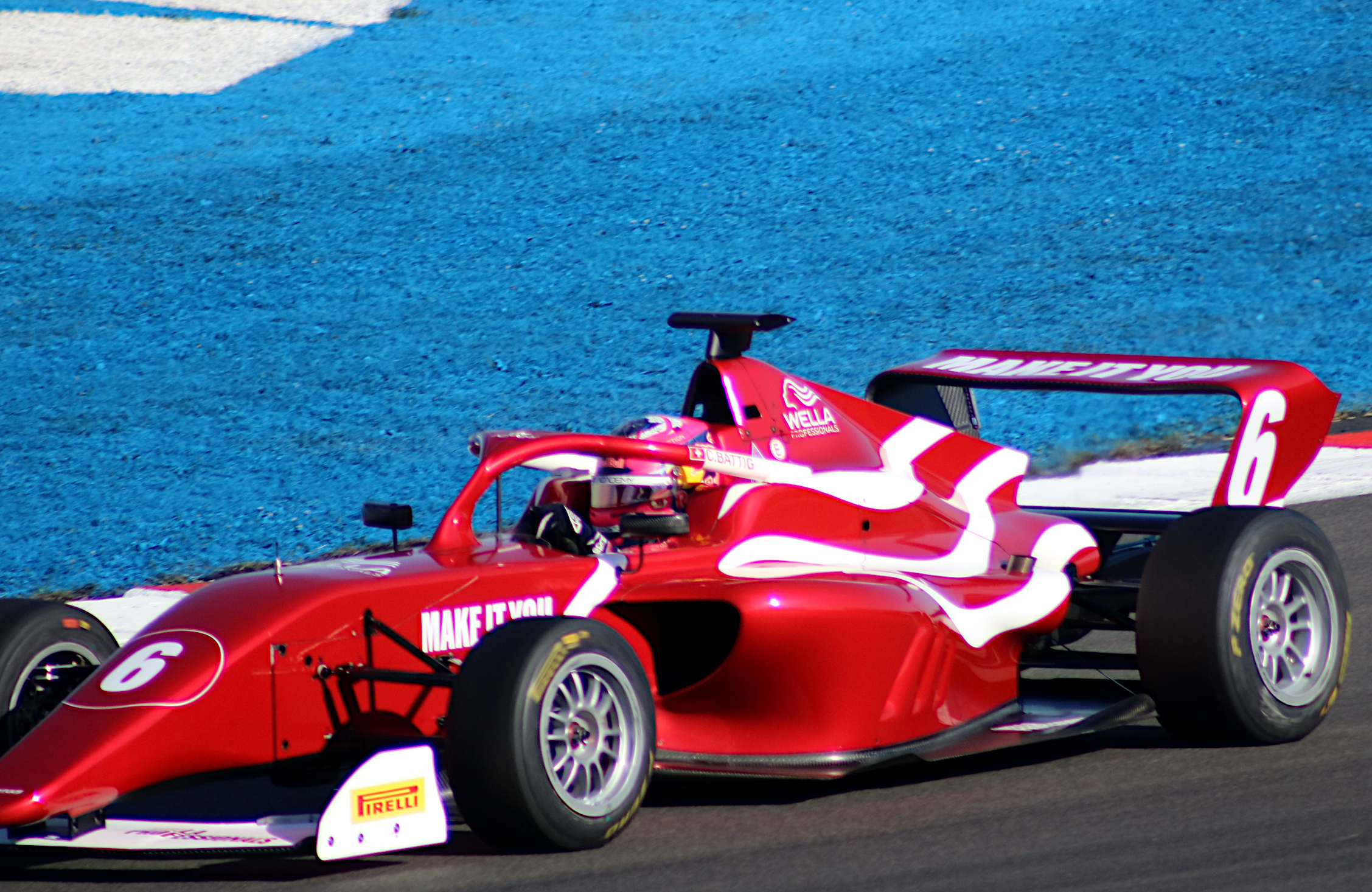
Silverstone wildcard entry and pole-sitter Chiara Bättig, pictured in qualifying.

Qualifying at Silverstone saw wildcard entry Chiara Bättig take pole, thus becoming the first wildcard to take pole in F1 Academy history and the youngest driver to top a session. Championship leader Alisha Palmowski qualified second, with Lisa Billard in third.

The reverse-grid race had Emma Felbermayr starting on pole, and she proceeded to lead the race from lights-to-flag, taking her second win of the season. Nina Gademan and Ella Lloyd completed the podium, also finishing in their respective starting positions of second and third. Rachel Robertson scored her first points of the season in fourth ahead of Palmowski, and Bättig recovered from a slow start to pick up the final point in eighth, as well as an additional point for getting the fastest lap out of the top eight finishers.

The feature race started under cooler morning conditions. Multiple drivers struggled off the grid at the start; Bättig was slow and Palmowski managed to seize the lead by the apex of Turn 1. Second row starters Lisa Billard and Ava Dobson had an even tougher time of things; Billard stalling and dropping all the way to the back while Dobson lost multiple positions off the line. Lloyd and Felbermayr were the biggest beneficiaries as a result, moving through to third and fourth respectively. Contact between Rafaela Ferreira and Ella Stevens on the start-finish straight at the beginning of lap 2 resulted in the deployment of the safety car; both drivers retired with damage. On the resulting restart, Felbermayr continued her charge through the order and passed Lloyd for third, with Gademan following her through as well. Her charge ended there as she was unable to keep up with Palmowski and Bättig, as they set about pulling clear of the field. Bättig stayed close to her Red Bull stablemate Palmowski throughout the race and never let the gap extend to a second at any stage, however she could never get close enough to threaten an overtaking move either. Palmowski went on to win her home race by six tenths ahead of Bättig, with Felbermayr finishing a distant third to take her second consecutive podium of the weekend. With this win, Palmowski extended her championship advantage over Felbermayr to 30 points heading into the summer break.

=== Round 4: Zandvoort ===
The series resumed at Zandvoort after the summer break, and a chaotic wet-to-dry qualifying session contained two red flags. Alisha Palmowski achieved pole for the feature race, with Alba Larsen setting the second fastest time, eight tenths of a second slower than Palmowski. Natalia Granada was a career-best third, ahead of championship conteder Emma Felbermayr. Wildcard driver Zoe Florescu initially qualified seventh, only to be disqualified from qualifying for a technical infringement; this promoted Payton Westcott to eighth and pole for the reverse-grid race.

Westcott proceeded to dominate the reverse-grid race, navigating two safety car periods to lead from start to finish, and win her first F1 Academy race. Larsen charged from seventh to second to achieve her first F1 Academy podium, while Nina Gademan completed the podium in third at her home race. Esmee Kosterman claimed her first points of the year with fourth, while both Palmowski and Felbermayr finished outside the points; the former due to stalling on the grid and latter due to a five-second time penalty for contact with Rachel Robertson.

Palmowski held on to the lead at the start the feature race, and came under intense pressure from Larsen in the first half of the race before eventually managing to pull clear and win by 2.7 seconds. Larsen and Gademan repeated their reverse-grid results of second and third respectively, with Granada holding off Felbermayr to finish fourth. This result increased Palmowski's championship advantage to 48 points over Felbermayr, while Gademan and Larsen moved up to third and fourth in the standings after their double podiums.

=== Round 5: Circuit of the Americas ===
Like the round in Canada earlier in the season, three races were held across the Circuit of the Americas (COTA) weekend because of the cancellation of the round at Jeddah. Championship leader Alisha Palmowski beat local driver Payton Westcott to pole for both the opening race and the feature race, after her best lap time, initially deleted for track limits, was reinstated.

In the opening race, Westcott got a better launch than Palmowski at the start, but Palmowski fought back and reclaimed the lead through turns 7 and 8. Westcott dropped down to eighth after an off-track excursion later in the opening lap, and contact between Megan Bruce, Rafaela Ferreira and Rachel Robertson which resulted in the latter having to retire led to the safety car being called. At the resulting restart, Alba Larsen passed Nina Gademan to move into second, but the move soon came under investigation by the stewards after she went off track during the overtake; Larsen eventually returned the position on the final lap. Palmowski claimed her fifth win of the season ahead of Gademan, who fended off a last-ditch attempt by Larsen to hold on to second. Emma Felbermayr finished fifth after starting 11th on the grid, but she dropped to 63 points behind Palmowski in the standings; with Palmowski needing to outscore Felbermayr by two points in the reverse-grid race to win the championship.

The reverse-grid race saw front-row starters Ferreira and Jade Jacquet clash at turn 16 while battling for the lead. Ferreira suffered front wing damage while Jacquet was spun around and collected by wildcard Alexia Danielsson. This brought out the safety car, and Danielsson would later be ruled unfit for the feature race with a wrist injury sustained in the crash. Larsen took advantage of the incident up ahead to move into the lead. When the safety car period ended, she quickly pulled clear at the front, and remained unchallenged for the rest of the race and took her maiden F1 Academy victory. Palmowski battled Felbermayr early on and steadily worked her way up the order, passing Lisa Billard for second on lap 8. This, along with the point for fastest lap, was enough to crown Palmowski the 2026 F1 Academy Drivers' champion, becoming the first Briton and Campos driver to do so.

Westcott again got the jump on newly-crowned champion Palmowski off the line in the feature race, but it was Gademan who led out of turn 1 after going around the outside of both front-row starters. Palmowski and Larsen both passed Westcott on lap 2 and proceeded to battle each other for second. This continued on till lap 10 when they collided exiting turn 12, after Larsen's left front made contact with the right rear of Palmowski's car; both drivers retired with suspension damage and the safety car was called. Gademan managed the resulting restart to take her third career win, and first feature race win. Westcott finished second on home soil with Natalia Granada completing the podium, and Jacquet took a career-best result of fourth. This win moved Gademan to second in the standings, 6 points ahead of Felbermayr.

=== Rookie Test ===
For the second year running, a rookie test was held to develop and evaluate potential new drivers for future seasons of F1 Academy. The initiative was expanded to include a training camp at Loughborough University on 25–27 August, before the on-track testing at Circuito de Navarra on 9–11 September. Eighteen drivers were selected.

- (Sweden) Alexia Danielsson
- (Netherlands) Eva Dorrestijn
- (Netherlands) Rosanne den Drijver
- (Brazil) Vicky Farfus
- (Canada) Autumn Fisher
- (Romania) Zoe Florescu
- (Spain) Luna Fluxá
- (United States) Yana Kapoor
- (Singapore) Kareen Kaur
- (Estonia) Carmen Kraav
- (Finland) Ella Lähdemaa
- (United States) Jordyn Martin
- (Japan) Sara Matsui
- (Italy) Ginevra Panzeri
- (Japan) Kokoro Sato
- (Sweden) Milla Sjöstrand
- (Austria) Clara Stiebleichinger
- (Morocco) Sofia Zanfari

== Results and standings ==
Round		Circuit	Pole position	Fastest lap	Winning driver	Winning team
1	RG	(China) Shanghai International Circuit		(Denmark) Alba Hurup Larsen (Note: Alba Hurup Larsen set the fastest lap but did not finish in the top 8, so she was ineligible to score the point for it. Ella Lloyd scored the point for setting the fastest lap amongst the top 8.)	(Netherlands) Nina Gademan	(Netherlands) MP Motorsport
1	FR	(China) Shanghai International Circuit	(United Kingdom) Alisha Palmowski	(United Kingdom) Alisha Palmowski	(Austria) Emma Felbermayr	(New Zealand) Rodin Motorsport
2	OR	(Canada) Circuit Gilles Villeneuve	(United Kingdom) Alisha Palmowski	(United States) Payton Westcott (Note: Payton Westcott set the fastest lap but did not finish in the top 10, so she was ineligible to score the point for it. Alisha Palmowski scored the point for setting the fastest lap amongst the top 10.)	(United Kingdom) Alisha Palmowski	(Spain) Campos Racing
2	RG	(Canada) Circuit Gilles Villeneuve		(United Kingdom) Ella Lloyd (Note: Ella Lloyd set the fastest lap but did not finish in the top 8, so she was ineligible to score the point for it. Lisa Billard scored the point for setting the fastest lap amongst the top 8.)	(Germany) Mathilda Paatz	(Italy) Prema Racing
2	FR	(Canada) Circuit Gilles Villeneuve	(United Kingdom) Alisha Palmowski	(Denmark) Alba Hurup Larsen	(United Kingdom) Alisha Palmowski	(Spain) Campos Racing
3	RG	(United Kingdom) Silverstone Circuit		(Netherlands) Esmee Kosterman (Note: Esmee Kosterman set the fastest lap but did not finish in the top 8, so she was ineligible to score the point for it. Chiara Bättig scored the point for setting the fastest lap amongst the top 8.)	(Austria) Emma Felbermayr	(New Zealand) Rodin Motorsport
3	FR	(United Kingdom) Silverstone Circuit	(Switzerland) Chiara Bättig	(United Kingdom) Alisha Palmowski	(United Kingdom) Alisha Palmowski	(Spain) Campos Racing
4	RG	(Netherlands) Circuit Zandvoort		(United States) Payton Westcott	(United States) Payton Westcott	(Italy) Prema Racing
4	FR	(Netherlands) Circuit Zandvoort	(United Kingdom) Alisha Palmowski	(United Kingdom) Alisha Palmowski	(United Kingdom) Alisha Palmowski	(Spain) Campos Racing
5	OR	(United States) Circuit of the Americas	(United Kingdom) Alisha Palmowski	(Denmark) Alba Hurup Larsen	(United Kingdom) Alisha Palmowski	(Spain) Campos Racing
5	RG	(United States) Circuit of the Americas		(United Kingdom) Alisha Palmowski	(Denmark) Alba Hurup Larsen	(Netherlands) MP Motorsport
5	FR	(United States) Circuit of the Americas	(United Kingdom) Alisha Palmowski	(Denmark) Alba Hurup Larsen (Note: Alba Hurup Larsen set the fastest lap but did not finish in the top 10, so she was ineligible to score the point for it. Nina Gademan scored the point for setting the fastest lap amongst the top 10.)	(Netherlands) Nina Gademan	(Netherlands) MP Motorsport
6	RG	(United States) Las Vegas Strip Circuit		(United Kingdom) Alisha Palmowski	(Denmark) Alba Hurup Larsen	(Netherlands) MP Motorsport
6	FR	(United States) Las Vegas Strip Circuit	(United Kingdom) Alisha Palmowski	(United Kingdom) Alisha Palmowski	(United Kingdom) Alisha Palmowski	(Spain) Campos Racing

=== Qualifying ===
The fastest laps from qualifying set the grid for the feature race. The top 8 from qualifying is inverted for the reverse-grid race, with the driver that qualified P8 starting from pole position. The second-fastest laps from qualifying set the grid for the opening race.

=== Scoring system ===
Two points are awarded to the driver who starts the feature race from pole position. Fastest lap points are also handed out in each race to the driver and team who achieved the fastest valid lap time and classified inside the top 8 for the reverse-grid race, and top 10 for the opening and feature races. No points are given to the driver who clocked the fastest lap time but finished outside the points.

Reverse-grid race points

Points are awarded to the top eight classified finishers. A bonus point is awarded to the driver who set the fastest lap and finished in the top eight.

Position	1st	2nd	3rd	4th	5th	6th	7th	8th	FL
Points	10	8	6	5	4	3	2	1	1

Feature race and opening race points

Points are awarded to the top ten classified finishers. Bonus points are awarded to only the feature race pole-sitter and to the driver who set the fastest lap and finished in the top ten.

Position	1st	2nd	3rd	4th	5th	6th	7th	8th	9th	10th	Pole	FL
Points	25	18	15	12	10	8	6	4	2	1	2 (Note: Only in the feature race.)	1

=== Drivers' championship ===
Pos.	Driver	SHA (China)		MTL (Canada)			SIL (United Kingdom)		ZAN (Netherlands)		COA (United States)			LVG (United States)		Points
Pos.	Driver	R1	R2	R1	R2	R3	R1	R2	R1	R2	R1	R2	R3	R1	R2	Points
1	(United Kingdom) Alisha Palmowski	5	2^{P}^{F}	1^{P}^{F}	10	1^{P}	5	1^{F}	12	1^{P}^{F}	1^{P}	2^{F}	Ret^{P}	2^{F}	1^{P}^{F}	209
2	(Netherlands) Nina Gademan	1	4	9	Ret	7	2	4	3	3	2	5	1^{F}	14†	3	134
3	(Austria) Emma Felbermayr	3	1	10	6	2	1	3	13	5	5	4	5	Ret	4	125
4	(Denmark) Alba Hurup Larsen	18	8	5	11	6^{F}	10	10	2	2	3^{F}	1	Ret	1	2	104
5	(United States) Payton Westcott	6	3	16	3	4	14	11	1^{F}	9	7	6	2	7	8	82
6	(United Kingdom) Megan Bruce	12	9	2	7	3	9	9	7	6	13	7	10	3	10	59
7	(Spain) Natalia Granada	2	14	14	4	8	15	7	Ret	4	6	14	3	8	Ret	59
8	(United Kingdom) Ella Lloyd	7^{F}	5	6	13	9	3	5	5	8	16	8	8	10	Ret	52
9	(France) Lisa Billard	8	7	15	5^{F}	15	6	14	10	12	4	3	6	Ret	Ret	41
10	(Germany) Mathilda Paatz	14	11	3	1	5	16	12	15	17	11	9	12	Ret	9	37
11	(Brazil) Rafaela Ferreira	4	6	4	8	10	11	Ret	14	15	14	13	15	6	12	30
12	(United Kingdom) Rachel Robertson	10	15†	13	Ret	14	4	6	6	7	Ret	15	7	Ret	13	28
13	(France) Jade Jacquet	13	Ret	12	12	13	18	13	Ret	11	10	Ret	4	4	6	26
14	(Switzerland) Chiara Bättig						8^{F}	2^{P}								22
15	(United States) Kaylee Countryman	16	13	7	2	16	17	16	9	12	12	10	14	13	14	14
16	(United States) Ava Dobson	9	10	17	Ret	17	7	8	8	13	Ret	Ret	13	12	7	14
17	(Netherlands) Esmee Kosterman	15	Ret	18	9	12	12	15	4	10	8	11	9	9	15	12
18	(United Kingdom) Ella Stevens	11	12	8	15	11	13	Ret	16	14	9	12	11	5	11	10
19	(Spain) Luna Fluxá													11	5	10
20	(Canada) Autumn Fisher			11	14	18										0
21	(Romania) Zoe Florescu								11	18						0
22	(Sweden) Alexia Danielsson										15	Ret	WD			0
23	(China) Shi Wei	17	Ret													0
Pos.	Driver	R1	R2	R1	R2	R3	R1	R2	R1	R2	R1	R2	R3	R1	R2	Points
Pos.	Driver	SHA (China)		MTL (Canada)			SIL (United Kingdom)		ZAN (Netherlands)		COA (United States)			LVG (United States)		Points

Key
Colour	Result
Gold	Winner
Silver	Second place
Bronze	Third place
Green	Other points position
Blue	Other classified position
Blue	Not classified, finished (NC)
Purple	Not classified, retired (Ret)
Red	Did not qualify (DNQ)
Black	Disqualified (DSQ)
White	Did not start (DNS)
White	Race cancelled (C)
Blank	Did not practice (DNP)
Blank	Excluded (EX)
Blank	Did not arrive (DNA)
Blank	Withdrawn (WD)
Blank	Did not enter (empty cell)
Annotation	Meaning
P	Pole position
F	Fastest lap

† — Did not finish, but classified

=== Teams' championship ===
Pos.	Team	SHA (China)		MTL (Canada)			SIL (United Kingdom)		ZAN (Netherlands)		COA (United States)			LVG (United States)		Points
Pos.	Team	R1	R2	R1	R2	R3	R1	R2	R1	R2	R1	R2	R3	R1	R2	Points
1	(Spain) Campos Racing	4	2^{P}^{F}	1^{P}^{F}	7	1^{P}	5	1^{F}	7	1^{P}^{F}	1^{P}	2^{F}	Ret^{P}	2^{F}	1^{P}^{F}	298
1	(Spain) Campos Racing	5	6	2	8	3	9	9	12	6	13	7	10	3	10	298
1	(Spain) Campos Racing	12	9	4	10	10	11	Ret	14	15	14	13	15	6	12	298
2	(Netherlands) MP Motorsport	1	4	5	9	6^{F}	2	4	2	2	2	1	1^{F}	1	2	250
2	(Netherlands) MP Motorsport	15	8	9	11	7	10	10	3	3	3^{F}	5	9	9	3	250
2	(Netherlands) MP Motorsport	18	Ret	18	Ret	12	12	15	4	10	8	11	Ret	14†	15	250
3	(New Zealand) Rodin Motorsport	3	1	6	6	2	1	3	5	5	5	4	5	5	4	187
3	(New Zealand) Rodin Motorsport	7^{F}	5	8	13	9	3	5	13	8	9	8	8	10	11	187
3	(New Zealand) Rodin Motorsport	11	12	10	15	11	13	Ret	16	14	16	12	11	Ret	Ret	187
4	(Italy) Prema Racing	2	3	3	1	4	14	7	1^{F}	4	6	6	2	7	8	178
4	(Italy) Prema Racing	6	14	14	3	5	15	11	15	9	7	9	3	8	9	178
4	(Italy) Prema Racing	14	11	16	4	8	16	12	Ret	17	11	14	12	Ret	Ret	178
5	(France) ART Grand Prix	8	7	7	2	13	6	13	9	11	4	3	4	4	6	81
5	(France) ART Grand Prix	13	13	12	5^{F}	15	17	14	10	12	10	10	6	13	14	81
5	(France) ART Grand Prix	16	Ret	15	12	16	18	16	Ret	16	12	Ret	14	Ret	Ret	81
6	(United Kingdom) Hitech	9	10	11	14	14	4	2^{P}	6	7	15	15	7	11	5	74
6	(United Kingdom) Hitech	10	Ret	13	Ret	17	7	6	8	13	Ret	Ret	13	12	7	74
6	(United Kingdom) Hitech	17	Ret	17	Ret	18	8^{F}	8	11	18	Ret	Ret	WD	Ret	13	74
Pos.	Team	R1	R2	R1	R2	R3	R1	R2	R1	R2	R1	R2	R3	R1	R2	Points
Pos.	Team	SHA (China)		MTL (Canada)			SIL (United Kingdom)		ZAN (Netherlands)		COA (United States)			LVG (United States)		Points

Key
Colour	Result
Gold	Winner
Silver	Second place
Bronze	Third place
Green	Other points position
Blue	Other classified position
Blue	Not classified, finished (NC)
Purple	Not classified, retired (Ret)
Red	Did not qualify (DNQ)
Black	Disqualified (DSQ)
White	Did not start (DNS)
White	Race cancelled (C)
Blank	Did not practice (DNP)
Blank	Excluded (EX)
Blank	Did not arrive (DNA)
Blank	Withdrawn (WD)
Blank	Did not enter (empty cell)
Annotation	Meaning
P	Pole position
F	Fastest lap

† — Did not finish, but classified
