= Alisha Palmowski =

British racing driver (born 2006)

- Palmowski at the 2026 Dutch Grand Prix
- Nationality: (United Kingdom) British
- Born: 21 September 2006 (age 20) Glossop, Derbyshire, England

F1 Academy career
- Debut season: 2024
- Current team: Campos Racing
- Car number: 21
- Former teams: Prema Racing
- Starts: 27
- Championships: 1
- Wins: 6
- Podiums: 12
- Poles: 6
- Fastest laps: 4
- Best finish: 1st in 2026

Previous series
- 2024; 2022−2023; 2022: GB4; Ginetta Junior; Ginetta Junior Winter

Championship titles
- 2026: F1 Academy
- Statistics up to date as of 13 November 2026.

Alisha Palmowski (/ˈpɑːlmɒfski/; born 21 September 2006) is a British racing driver who competes in F1 Academy for Campos Racing as part of the Red Bull Academy Programme. She will compete in Formula Regional European Championship with Rodin Motorsport as part of the Red Bull Junior Team in 2027. Palmowski is the 2026 F1 Academy driver's champion.

== Early life and education ==
Palmowski is from Glossop, England. She attended St Philip Howard Catholic Voluntary Academy in Glossop, Derbyshire. Her father and grandfather are fans of motorsport, which influenced her upbringing. Her great-grandfather drove BriSCA F1 Stock Cars from the 1970s to the 1990s.

== Junior career ==
=== Karting ===
Palmowski first drove in an indoor karting arena in 2015.

Palmowski competed in the Manchester and Tamworth’s Daytona Junior InKart Championship. Making her competitive karting debut in the 2018 BirelART UK Series – Junior category, Palmowski then moved to the Daniel Ricciardo Series – DRS100 for the rest of her karting career, finishing in ninth in 2019, and runner-up to the title in 2020 and 2021.

=== Ginetta Junior Championship ===
Palmowski won the 2022 Ginetta Junior Scholarship, joining Jamie Chadwick as the only women to earn the honor. She finished the Winter Championship in second place. Palmowski finished the 2022 Ginetta Junior Championship in 13th, with six top-ten finishes.

Palmowski continued in the series for 2023, getting her first podium and best result with a third place at Oulton Park. At the next race, she bested this result with two second places at Silverstone Circuit. She continued this momentum throughout the series, getting three out of three podiums at Brands Hatch, and her first pole position at the second race of the final round at Donington Park, which she converted to a second-place finish.

Palmowski finished fifth in the championship with ten podiums, one pole position and 498 points.

=== GB4 Championship ===
Palmowski continued her relationship with Elite Motorsport in the 2024 GB4 Championship, making her single-seater debut. She had an impressive debut race, winning the first race of the season by margin of 3.6 seconds. She ended her campaign as the runner-up to the title, with 422 points, three wins, two pole positions and eleven podiums.

=== F1 Academy ===
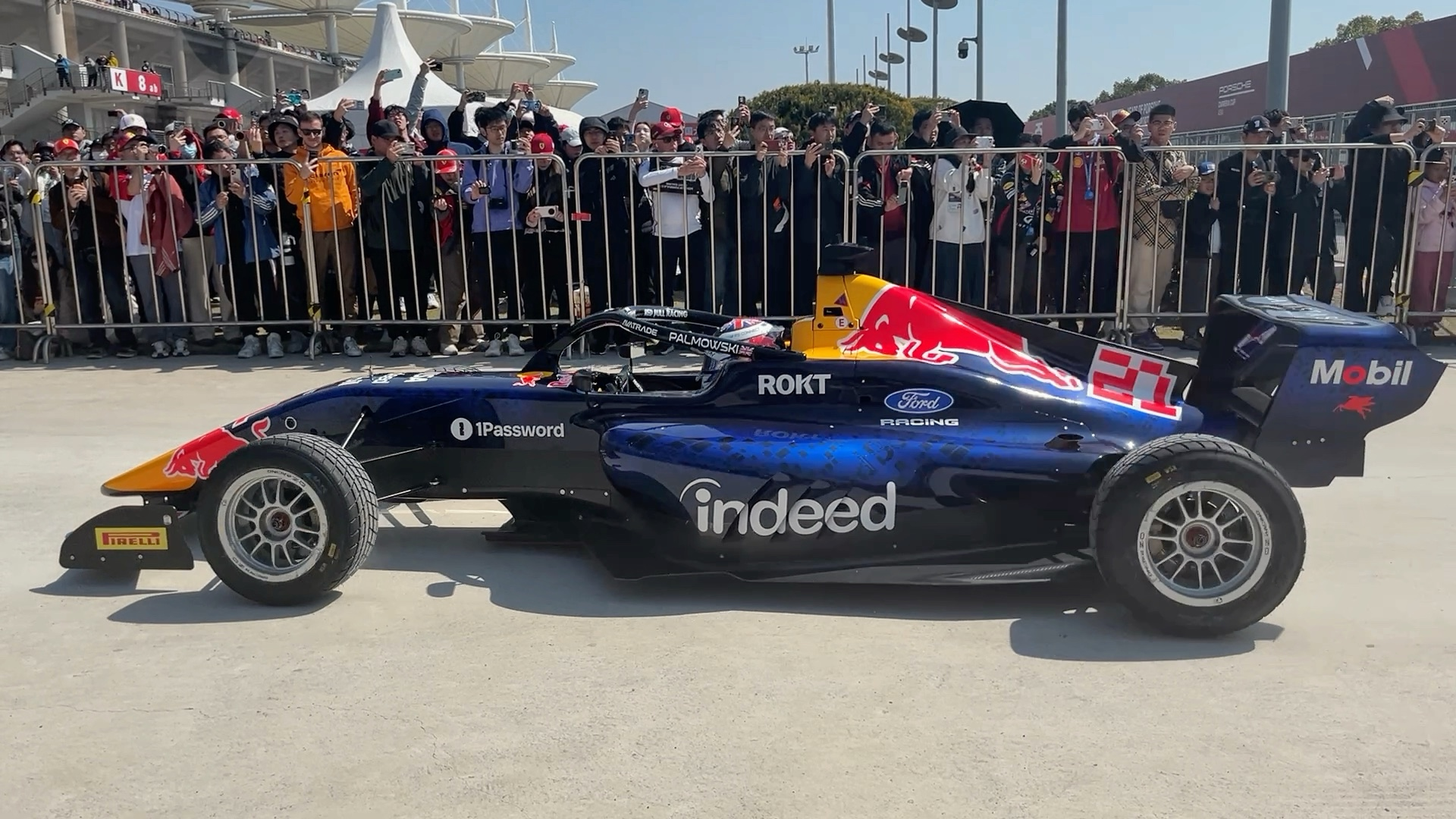
Palmowski at the 2026 F1 Academy Shanghai round.

Palmowski joined the 2024 season of F1 Academy as the wildcard entry for the round in Qatar, where she topped the first session of in-season testing. In Race 1, she finished in fifth place. She had qualified fourth for Race 2, but the race was cancelled after a crash in a different series caused extensive damage to the barriers.

Palmowski returned for the 2025 season where she raced for Campos Racing as the Red Bull Racing supported driver. She secured her maiden F1 Academy win at the season opener in Race 1 at Shanghai. Palmowski placed fifth overall in the season, with one win and five podium finishes.

Red Bull Racing and Campos retained Palmowski for the 2026 season. She claimed her first race victory of the season in the opening race at Montreal and her first grand chelem in the feature race at Zandvoort. She secured the drivers' championship at Austin, coming second in the reverse grid race following her race victory in the opening race from pole position.

=== Formula Regional European Championship ===
For winning the 2026 F1 Academy drivers' championship, Palmowski was promoted to the Red Bull Junior Team and received a fully-funded seat for the 2027 Formula Regional European Championship with Rodin Motorsport through the Red Bull Junior Programme and F1 Academy.

== Formula E ==
Palmowski took part in the 2024 Formula E women's test, where she drove for Envision Racing alongside Alice Powell. She finished the session 16th of 17 participating drivers with a fastest lap of 1:35.145, completing 24 laps.

== Karting record ==
=== Karting career summary ===
Season	Series	Team	Position
2018	BirelART UK Series - Junior		
2019	Daniel Ricciardo Series - DRS100		9th
2020	Daniel Ricciardo Series - DRS100		2nd
2021	Daniel Ricciardo Series - DRS100		2nd

== Racing record ==
=== Racing career summary ===
Season	Series	Team	Races	Wins	Poles	F/Laps	Podiums	Points	Position
2022	Ginetta Junior Winter Championship	Preptech UK	4	0	2	0	1	102	**2nd**
2022	Ginetta Junior Championship	Preptech UK	25	0	0	0	0	156	13th
2023	Ginetta Junior Championship	Elite Motorsport	27	0	1	1	10	498	5th
2024	GB4 Championship	Elite Motorsport	20	3	2	1	11	422	**2nd**
2024	F1 Academy	Prema Racing	1	0	0	0	0	10	17th
2025	Formula Winter Series	Campos Racing	6	0	0	0	0	0	23rd
2025	F1 Academy	Campos Racing	14	1	0	0	5	91	5th
2026	Formula Winter Series	Campos Racing	6	0	1	0	0	12	19th
2026	F1 Academy	Campos Racing	14	6	7	6	9	209	**1st**
2027	Formula Regional European Championship	Rodin Motorsport	0	0	0	0	0	0	TBD

* Season in progress.

=== Complete Ginetta Junior Championship results ===
(key) (Races in bold indicate pole position) (Races in italics indicate fastest lap)

Year	Team	1	2	3	4	5	6	7	8	9	10	11	12	13	14	15	16	17	18	19	20	21	22	23	24	25	26	27	D.C.	Points
2022	Preptech UK	DON; 1; 21	DON; 2; 9	DON; 3 Ret	BHI; 1; 12	BHI; 2 Ret	BHI; 3; 17	THR1; 1; 12	THR1; 2 Ret	CRO; 1 Ret	CRO; 2; 13	KNO; 1; 8	KNO; 2; 9	KNO; 3; 18	SNE; 1 Ret	SNE; 2; 14	SNE; 3; 9	THR2; 1; 12	THR2; 2; 19	THR2; 3; 11	SIL; 1; 9	SIL; 2; 13	SIL; 3; 13	BHGP; 1; 8	BHGP; 2 Ret	BHGP; 3; 18			13th	156
2023	Elite Motorsport	OUL; 1 Ret	OUL; 2; 3	OUL; 3; 9	SIL1; 1; 2	SIL1; 2; 5	SIL1; 3; 2	DON1; 1; 2	DON1; 2; 7	DON1; 3 Ret	SIL2; 1; 9	SIL2; 2; 3	SIL2; 3; 4	SIL2; 4; 11	SIL2; 5; 6	SIL2; 6; 10	SNE; 1; 10	SNE; 2; 9	SNE; 3; 7	CAD; 1; 3	CAD; 2; 6	CAD; 3; 10	BHGP; 1; 3	BHGP; 2; 2	BHGP; 3; 2	DON2; 1; 4	**DON2**; **2**; 2	DON2; 3; 8	5th	498

=== Complete GB4 Championship results ===
(key) (Races in bold indicate pole position) (Races in italics indicate fastest lap)

Year	Entrant	1	2	3	4	5	6	7	8	9	10	11	12	13	14	15	16	17	18	19	20	21	D.C.	Points
2024	Elite Motorsport	OUL; 1; 1	OUL; 2; 5	OUL; 3 Ret	SIL1; 1; 2	SIL1; 2; 4	SIL1; 3 C	DON1; 1 Ret	DON1; 2; 9	DON1; 3; 3^{6}	**SNE**; **1**; 2	**SNE**; **2**; 1	SNE; 3; 1^{11}	SIL2; 1; 3	SIL2; 2; 5	SIL2; 3; 7^{6}	DON2; 1; 3	DON2; 2; 4	DON2; 3; 3^{6}	BRH; 1; 4	BRH; 2; 3	BRH; 3; 2^{4}	2nd	422

=== Complete F1 Academy results ===
(key) (Races in bold indicate pole position; races in italics indicate fastest lap)

Year	Team	1	2	3	4	5	6	7	8	9	10	11	12	13	14	15	D.C.	Points
2024	Prema Racing	JED; 1	JED; 2	MIA; 1	MIA; 2	CAT; 1	CAT; 2	ZAN; 1	ZAN; 2	SIN; 1	SIN; 2	LSL; 1; 5	LSL; 2 C	YMC; 1	YMC; 2	YMC; 3	17th	10
2025	Campos Racing	SHA; 1; 1	SHA; 2; 6	JED; 1; 3	JED; 2; 4	MIA; 1; 2	MIA; 2 C	MTL; 1; 12	MTL; 2; 6	MTL; 3; 7	ZAN; 1; 7	ZAN; 2; 2	SIN; 1 Ret	SIN; 2; 15	LVG; 1 DSQ	LVG; 2; 2	5th	91
2026	Campos Racing	SHA; 1; 5	**SHA**; **2**; 2	**MTL**; **1**; 1	MTL; 2; 10	**MTL**; **3**; 1	SIL; 1; 5	SIL; 2; 1	ZAN; 1; 12	**ZAN**; **2**; 1	**COA**; **1**; 1	COA; 2; 2	**COA**; **3** Ret	LVG; 1	LVG; 2		1st*	161*

=== Complete Formula Winter Series results ===
(key) (Races in bold indicate pole position) (Races in italics indicate fastest lap)

Year	Team	1	2	3	4	5	6	7	8	9	10	11	12	13	14	15	D.C.	Points
2025	Campos Racing	POR; 1; 13	POR; 2; 13	POR; 3; 12	CRT; 1 Ret	CRT; 2; 15	CRT; 3; 24	ARA; 1	ARA; 2	ARA; 3	CAT; 1	CAT; 2	CAT; 3				23rd	0
2026	Campos Racing	EST; 1; 4	**EST**; **2**; 11	EST; 3; 15	POR; 1	POR; 2	POR; 3	CRT; 1	CRT; 2	CRT; 3	ARA; 1; 19	ARA; 2 Ret	ARA; 3; 13	CAT; 1	CAT; 2	CAT; 3	19th	12

=== Complete Formula Regional European Championship results ===
(key) (Races in bold indicate pole position; races in italics indicate fastest lap)

Year	Entrant	1	2	3	4	5	6	7	8	9	10	11	12	13	14	15	16	17	18	19	20	Pos	Points
2027	Rodin Motorsport	POR; 1	POR; 2	RBR; 1	RBR; 2	SIL; 1	SIL; 2	SPA; 1	SPA; 2	LEC; 1	LEC; 2	HUN; 1	HUN; 2	ZAN; 1	ZAN; 2	IMO; 1	IMO; 2	MNZ; 1	MNZ; 2	CAT; 1	CAT; 2	TBD	TBD
