= McLaren Driver Development Programme =

Program to support young racing drivers through their careers

(United Kingdom) McLaren Driver Development Programme
- Founded: 1998; 28 years ago
- Base: McLaren Technology Centre; Woking, Surrey, England
- Team principal(s): Alessandro Alunni Bravi; Warren Hughes
- Current drivers: IndyCar (Mexico) Pato O'Ward; European Le Mans Series (Netherlands) Richard Verschoor (Switzerland) Grégoire Saucy; FIA Formula 3 (Italy) Matteo De Palo; F1 Academy (United Kingdom) Ella Lloyd (United Kingdom) Ella Stevens; Formula 4 (Spain) Christian Costoya (Belgium) Dries Van Langendonck (Czech Republic) Ella Häkkinen; Karting (United Kingdom) Harry Williams; TBA (Italy) Leonardo Fornaroli

The McLaren Driver Development Programme, formerly known as the McLaren Young Driver Programme, is a driver development programme operated by McLaren. It is intended to offer year-by-year guidance, assistance and endorsement to help promising young racers climb the motorsport ladder. The programme was also formerly known as the McLaren-Honda Young Driver Programme and the McLaren-Mercedes Young Driver Support Programme, reflecting engine deals with Honda and Mercedes, respectively.

As of 2026, 10 former programme drivers have progressed to Formula One, with four graduating directly with McLaren: Lewis Hamilton in 2007, Kevin Magnussen in 2014, Stoffel Vandoorne in 2016, and Lando Norris in 2019. Hamilton and Norris have each won a Formula One World Drivers' Championship (2008 and 2025, respectively) and multiple Grands Prix with McLaren. Hamilton, one of the programme's first and most notable participant, won the drivers' championship seven times between 2008 and 2020.

== History ==
McLaren Young Driver Development Programme logo.

The programme was founded in 1998 by McLaren and Mercedes as the McLaren-Mercedes Young Driver Support Programme. The programme notably signed Lewis Hamilton, Nick Heidfeld and Nicolas Minassian as some of its first drivers. From 2019 to 2021, no drivers were part of the program. McLaren Racing CEO Zak Brown said this was due to the team's "very targeted" approach and already stable Formula One line-up, meaning it would be difficult for any young drivers to find a place in Formula One.

In April 2023, the Young Driver Programme was replaced by the Driver Development Programme. Later in October, the programme signed its first female driver in Bianca Bustamante, who represented McLaren in the 2024 season of F1 Academy. In October 2024, the programme signed its second female driver in Ella Lloyd, who represented McLaren in the 2025 F1 Academy season in place of Bustamante, who left the series and the programme after completing her second season. In November 2025, the programme announced the signing of Ella Häkkinen, the programme's youngest signing at the age of 14 and the daughter of 1998 and 1999 World Drivers' Champion and former McLaren driver Mika Häkkinen. The programme also signed Ella Stevens, who will join Lloyd as McLaren's second F1 Academy supported driver for the 2026 season.

== Current drivers ==
Driver	Years	Current Series	Titles as McLaren Driver Development Programme member
(Mexico) Pato O'Ward	2023–	IndyCar Series	None
(Belgium) Dries Van Langendonck	2024–	Formula Winter Series; F4 British Championship	Formula Winter Series (2026); F4 British Championship (2026)
(United Kingdom) Ella Lloyd	2025–	F1 Academy	None
(Italy) Matteo De Palo	2026–	FIA Formula 3 Championship	None
(Spain) Christian Costoya	2026–	UAE4 Series; Italian F4 Championship; E4 Championship	None
(Italy) Leonardo Fornaroli	2026–	TBA	None
(Czech Republic) Ella Häkkinen	2026–	Formula 4 CEZ Championship	None
(Switzerland) Grégoire Saucy	2026–	European Le Mans Series	None
(United Kingdom) Ella Stevens	2026–	F1 Academy; Formula Winter Series	None
(Netherlands) Richard Verschoor	2026–	European Le Mans Series	None
(United Kingdom) Harry Williams	2026–	Karting	None

== Graduates to Formula One ==
This list contains the drivers that have graduated to Formula One with McLaren. Therefore, drivers who have had support in the past and entered F1 through other teams such as Nick Heidfeld (with Prost Grand Prix) and Gabriel Bortoleto (with Sauber), are not included.

Driver	Academy experience		F1 experience with McLaren	F1 experience with other teams
Driver	Years	Former series	F1 experience with McLaren	F1 experience with other teams
(United Kingdom) Lewis Hamilton†	1998–2006	Karting (1998–2001); **British Formula Renault Championship** (2002–**2003**); **Formula 3 Euro Series** (2004–**2005**); **GP2 Series** (**2006**)	2007–**2008**–2012	Mercedes (2013–2024); Ferrari (2025–)
(Denmark) Kevin Magnussen	2010–2013	German Formula Three Championship (2010); British Formula 3 International Series (2011); **Formula Renault 3.5 Series** (2012–**2013**)	2014–2015	Renault (2016); Haas (2017–2020, 2022–2024)
(Belgium) Stoffel Vandoorne	2013–2016	Formula Renault 3.5 Series (2013); **GP2 Series** (2014–**2015**); Super Formula (2016)	2016–2018	—N/a
(United Kingdom) Lando Norris†	2017–2018	**FIA Formula 3 European Championship** (**2017**); FIA Formula 2 Championship (2018)	2019–**2025**–	—N/a

- Championship titles highlighted in **bold**.
- † denotes currently active Formula One drivers.

== Former drivers ==
Driver	Years	Series competed	F1 team(s)
(United Kingdom) Wesley Graves	1998	Karting (1998)	None
(France) Nicolas Minassian	1998	International Formula 3000 Championship (1998)	None
(Germany) Norman Simon	1998	German Formula Three Championship (1998)	None
(Brazil) Ricardo Zonta	1998	**FIA GT Championship** (**1998**)	BAR (1999–2000); Jordan (2001); Toyota (2004–2005)
(Germany) Nick Heidfeld	1998–1999	**International Formula 3000 Championship** (1998–**1999**)	Prost (2000); Sauber (2001–2003; 2010); Jordan (2004); Williams (2005); BMW Sauber (2006–2009); Renault (2011)
(Brazil) Mário Haberfeld	1999	International Formula 3000 Championship (1999)	None
(France) Stéphane Sarrazin	2000	International Formula 3000 Championship (2000)	Minardi (1999)
(Czech Republic) Tomáš Enge	2000	International Formula 3000 Championship (2000)	Prost (2001)
(South Africa) Tomas Scheckter	2000	International Formula 3000 Championship (2000)	None
(China) Cheng Congfu	2003–2006	British Formula Renault Championship (2003–2006)	None
(Netherlands) Giedo van der Garde	2006	Formula 3 Euro Series (2006)	Caterham (2013)
(United Kingdom) Oliver Rowland	2007–2010	Karting (2007–2010)	None
(Thailand) Alexander Albon	2010	Karting (2010)	Toro Rosso (2019); Red Bull Racing (2019–2020); Williams (2022–)
(United Kingdom) Jack Harvey	2010	Formula BMW Europe (2010)	None
(Finland) Petri Suvanto	2010	Formula BMW Europe (2010)	None
(United Kingdom) Oliver Turvey	2010–2011	GP2 Series (2010–2011)	None
(United Kingdom) Ben Barnicoat	2010–2015	Karting (2010–2013); Formula Renault 2.0 NEC (2014); Eurocup Formula Renault 2.0 (2014–2015)	None
(Netherlands) Nyck de Vries	2010–2018	Karting (2010–2011); **Eurocup Formula Renault 2.0** (2012–**2014**); **Formula Renault 2.0 Alps** (2013–**2014**); Formula Renault 3.5 Series (2015); GP3 Series (2016); FIA Formula 2 Championship (2017–2018)	Williams (2022); AlphaTauri (2023)
(United Kingdom) Tom Blomqvist	2012	FIA Formula 3 European Championship (2012)	None
(Singapore) Andrew Tang	2012–2014	Karting (2012); **Toyota Racing Series** (2013–**2014**); Formula Renault 2.0 Alps Series (2013–2014)	None
(Japan) Nobuharu Matsushita (Note: Driver was simultaneously a member of the Honda Formula Dream Project.)	2015–2017	GP2 Series (2015–2016); FIA Formula 2 Championship (2017)	None
(Japan) Nirei Fukuzumi	2016–2017	GP3 Series (2016–2017)	None
(Brazil) Sérgio Sette Câmara	2019	FIA Formula 2 Championship (2019)	None
(United States) Ugo Ugochukwu	2021–2025	Karting (2021); F4 British Championship (2022); ADAC Formula 4 Championship (2022); Italian F4 Championship (2022–2023); **Euro 4 Championship** (**2023**); Formula Regional Middle East Championship (2024–2025); Formula Regional European Championship (2024); GB3 Championship (2024); **FIA FR World Cup** (**2024**); FIA Formula 3 Championship (2025)	None
(Spain) Álex Palou	2023	**IndyCar Series** (**2023**)	None
(Brazil) Gabriel Bortoleto	2023–2024	**FIA Formula 2 Championship** (**2024**)	Sauber (2025); Audi (2026–)
(Japan) Ryō Hirakawa (Note: Hirakawa was simultaneously a member of the TGR Driver Challenge Program.)	2023–2024	Super Formula (2023); **FIA World Endurance Championship** (**2023**–2024)	Haas (2026)
(Philippines) Bianca Bustamante	2024	F1 Academy (2024); Formula Winter Series (2024); F4 British Championship (2024); Italian F4 Championship (2024); Euro 4 Championship (2024)	None
(Republic of Ireland) Alex Dunne	2024–2025	FIA Formula 3 Championship (2024); FIA Formula 2 Championship (2025)	None
(Norway) Martinius Stenshorne	2024–2025	FIA Formula 3 Championship (2024–2025); FIA Formula 2 Championship (2025)	None
(Italy) Brando Badoer (Note: Badoer was signed to the programme as "optioned driver" in 2023 before earning full junior status in 2024.)	2025	FIA Formula 3 Championship (2025)	None

- Championship titles highlighted in **bold**.

== See also ==
- McLaren Autosport BRDC Award
- McLaren GT Driver Academy
