= Dries Van Langendonck =

Belgian racing driver (born 2010)

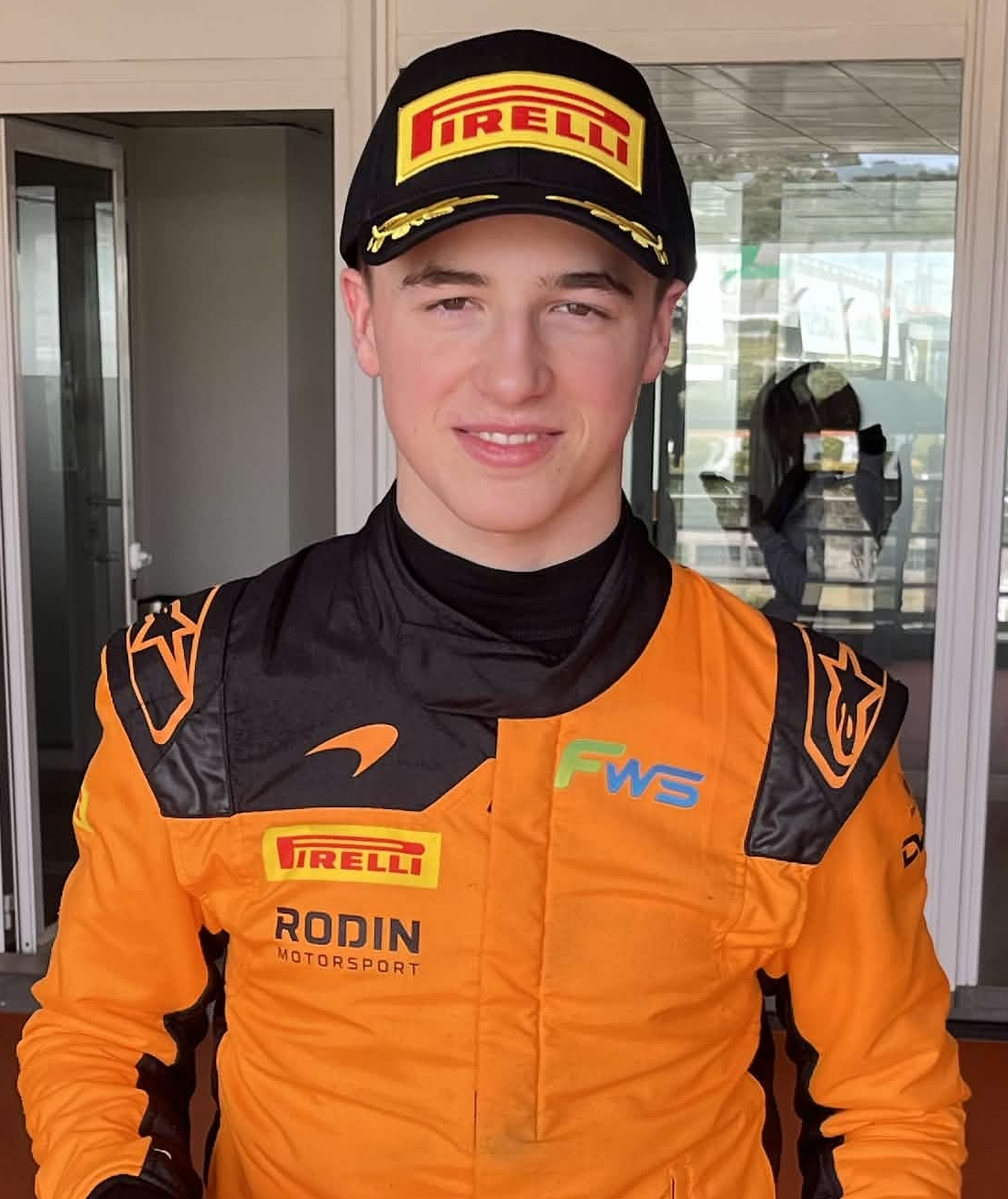
- Van Langendonck in 2026
- Born: 30 August 2010 (age 16); Hasselt, Limburg, Belgium
- Nationality: (Belgium) Belgian

F4 British Championship career
- Debut season: 2025
- Current team: Rodin Motorsport
- Car number: 51
- Starts: 36
- Wins: 9
- Podiums: 13
- Poles: 9
- Fastest laps: 5
- Best finish: 1st in 2026

Previous series
- 2026; 2025–2026: Formula Winter Series; F4 British

Championship titles
- 2026; 2026: F4 British; Formula Winter Series

Awards
- 2024: IKR Driver of the Year
- Statistics up to date as of 11 October 2026.
- Website: driesvanlangendonck.com

Dries Van Langendonck (Dutch: [dris fɑn ˈlɑŋ.ə(n).dɔŋk]; born 30 August 2010), also known by his initials DVL, is a Belgian racing driver who most recently competed in the F4 British Championship for Rodin Motorsport as part of the McLaren Driver Development Programme.

Born in Hasselt and raised in Heusden-Zolder, Van Langendonck began competitive kart racing aged eight. After a successful karting career—culminating in his victories at the junior World Championship in 2023 and European Championship in 2024—Van Langendonck graduated to junior formulae. He became the youngest race winner in British F4 history on debut in 2025, winning the title the following year alongside the Formula Winter Series.

== Early life ==
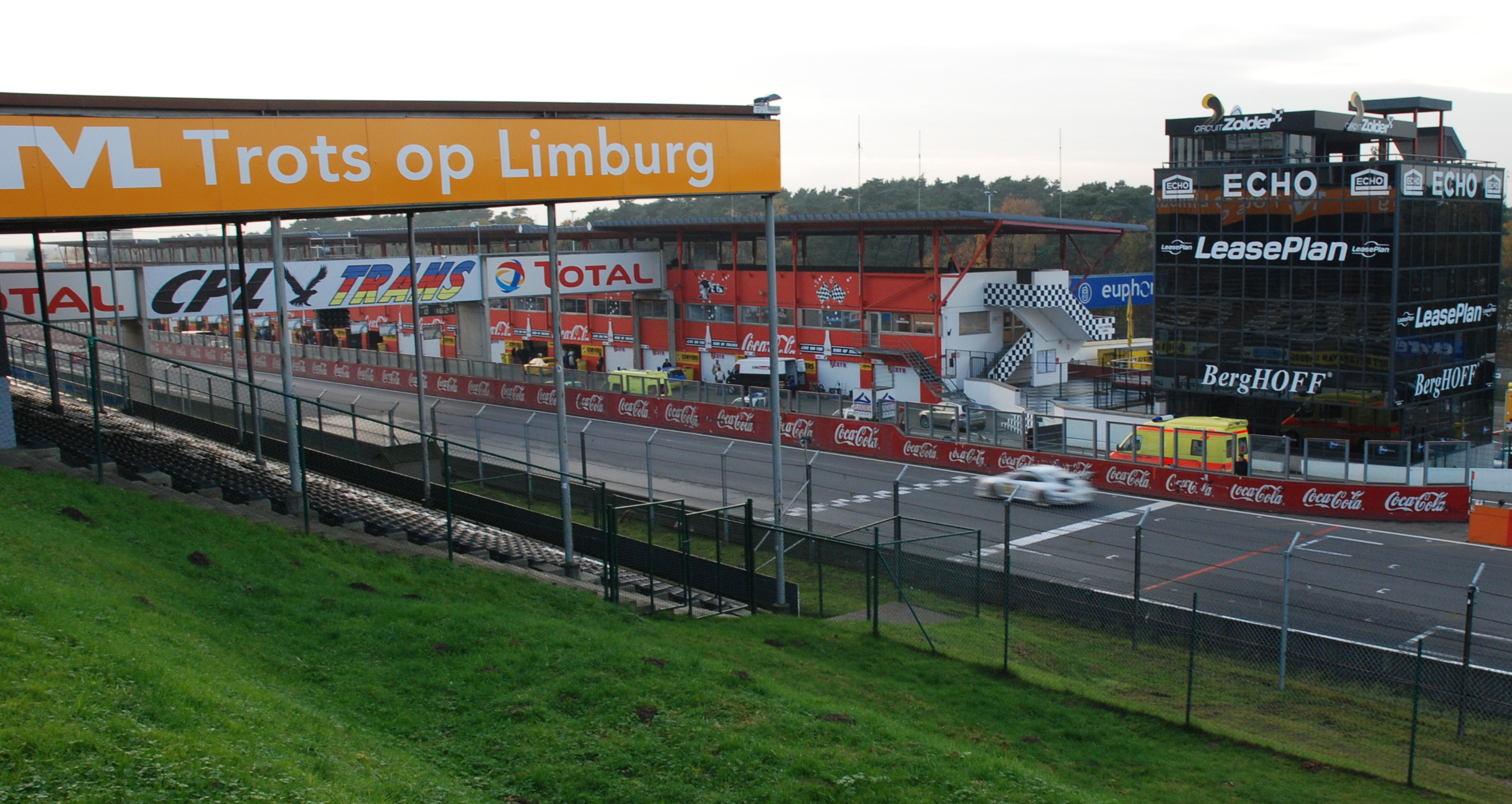
Van Langendonck was raised adjacent to Circuit Zolder, near the site of Gilles Villeneuve's fatal 1982 accident.

Dries Van Langendonck was born on 30 August 2010 in Hasselt, Limburg, Belgium. His father, Frank Van Langendonck, is an administrator and former kart racer, who was once a teammate of Jos Verstappen. His mother, Ester Meeus, is a businesswoman and medical graduate. His parents owned and managed the local Edco Rijschool, which his father eventually sold in 2024 to focus on his karting career. At a young age, his grandfather built a stand for him and his older brother, Tom, to watch races at Circuit Zolder—adjacent to the family home in Heusden-Zolder, which is located on the corner where Gilles Villeneuve died.

The brothers first began rental karting in 2017 at Genk; Tom quit competitive karting after sustaining serious injuries in an accident a year later. Van Langendonck was initially fearful of karting, further discussing his agoraphobia with Humo in 2026. His father worked three jobs to pay for his karting career prior to his McLaren signing, describing them as "the poorest sloebers in the paddock". In addition to cutting his karting career short for financial reasons, Van Langendonck used six hours of daily sim racing to account for missed track-time. He has cited Michael Schumacher, Ayrton Senna, and Max Verstappen as his racing idols, in addition to George Russell, who he first met as a mascot at the 2019 Belgian Grand Prix. He studies online at A-Maze in Beringen, learning English and Italian throughout his international karting career, and travels between Woking and Brussels for exams. He was initially managed by 2007 CIK-FIA World Championship runner-up Gary Catt, before Verstappen became his mentor in 2026.

== Racing career ==
=== Karting (2018–2025) ===
==== 2018–2022: National championships and international debut ====
Van Langendonck began competitive kart racing aged eight, contesting national championships with GKS Lemmens Power. He debuted in the RMC Golden Trophy that year, finishing seventeenth at Genk in Micro Max. In 2019, he won the Dutch Championship in the Rookie class; he further finished fifth and sixth in the BNL Karting Series and Rotax Max Challenge Belgium, respectively. He moved to the Italian scene with his 60 Mini debut in 2020, contesting the WSK Euro Series with Birel ART and claiming top-10 finishes in the ROK Cup Superfinal, Andrea Margutti Trophy, and Trofeo Ayrton Senna, while he also won a second Dutch Championship with Paauwer Racing.

With support from two-time World Champion Alessandro Manetti, he became the first member of Birel ART's driver development programme in 2021. He finished runner-up to Kilian Josseron at the South Garda Winter Cup and Jensen Burnett at the ROK Cup Superfinal, also claiming third in the Italian Championship, where he won the Trofeo Jesolo in X30 Mini; he finished fourth at the WSK Final Cup, sixth at the WSK Champions Cup, and seventh at the WSK Open Cup. With Parolin, he claimed his first major title in Italy at the Andrea Margutti Trophy in 2022, with additional top-fives at the WSK Champions Cup, WSK Super Master Series, and Italian Championship.

==== 2022–2024: Dominance in OK-Junior ====
Aged 12, Van Langendonck progressed to OK-Junior (OK-J)—the premier under-15 international karting category—with Energy Corse, finishing seventh on his World Championship debut at Sarno. In 2023, he finished runner-up to Lewis Wherrell in Champions of the Future—amongst top-five finishes in the European Championship and WSK Super Master Series—before joining Forza Racing. He became the first World Champion from Belgium since François Goldstein in 1975 with his victory over Christian Costoya at Franciacorta, which elevated him into the top-10 of the International Karting Ranking (IKR) for the first time, and he closed the season by winning the WSK Final Cup. Van Langendonck joined the RACB National Team for 2024, opening his campaign with runner-up positions at the WSK Champions Cup and WSK Super Master Series to Niklas Schaufler. With victories in Valencia and Slovakia—which propelled him to lead the IKR—he cruised to win the European Championship by 95 points over Costoya, further beating him and Schaufler in Champions of the Future while missing the final round to compete in OK. His successes in OK-J saw him named IKR Driver of the Year ahead of over 1,200 competitors.

==== 2024–2025: Progression to senior class with McLaren and de Grote Belgische F1-Hoop ====
Joining the McLaren Driver Development Programme, Van Langendonck progressed to the senior OK category in September 2024, aged 14. Following his sixth-placed debut in Champions of the Future and retiring from the rain-affected final of the World Championship at PF International, where he had an average heat position of 3.6, he won the WSK Final Cup ahead of Schaufler. He joined the Kart Republic–backed Prema outfit for 2025, winning the WSK Super Master Series and claiming a podium at Campillos on his OK European Championship debut, where he finished eighth overall after missing half the season. Upon his graduation to junior formulae midway through the season—following consultation with McLaren team principal Andrea Stella—Sporza described Van Langendonck as the "great Belgian [Formula One] hope".

=== Formula 4 (2025–present) ===
==== 2025: Youngest race winner in British F4 ====
On his fifteenth birthday, (Note: Since 2015, the minimum age for drivers competing in the F4 British Championship has been 15.) Van Langendonck graduated to junior formulae with his appearance in the eighth round of the F4 British Championship at Donington Park. He previously tested Formula 4 machinery across 14 sessions at Fontenay-le-Comte, Navarra, Vallelunga, and Brands Hatch, alongside simulator sessions at the McLaren Technology Centre. Stating "all I can and want to do is do everything to get [to Formula One]", he qualified on pole position on debut; starting second in race one, (Note: In the 2025 F4 British Championship, starting position for the first race was determined by each driver's second-fastest lap time in qualifying.) he dropped to fourteenth before claiming ninth in the reverse-grid second race. (Note: In the 2025 F4 British Championship, the top 12 qualifiers were subjected to a reverse-grid in the second race.) In the final race, he converted pole into victory, pulling a seven-second advantage over August Raber and becoming the youngest race winner in British F4 history. At Silverstone National, he claimed fifth in both qualifying groups before, in each race, he: was disqualified from sixth for a team administrative error; finished twentieth after receiving opening-lap front wing damage; and returned to the points with seventh. He qualified fifth and seventh in each group at the season-ending Brands Hatch round; starting from the pit lane in race one, he climbed to fourteenth, prior to his sixth-placed race two, and fifth-placed finale, helping Rodin clinch the Teams' Cup. He ended the season twenty-first overall on 38 points—having contested three of 10 rounds—with one victory and pole position. (Note: Van Langendonck was deducted 12 points.)

==== 2026: Maiden championships ====
Van Langendonck opened 2026 with his dominant maiden title in the Formula Winter Series.

Van Langendonck opened his 2026 campaign with Rodin in the Iberia-based Formula Winter Series, where he took a double pole position and won his opening race at Estoril in torrential rainfall, (Note: In the 2026 Formula Winter Series, the fastest times from two qualifying sessions set the grids for races one and three, while starting position for the second race was determined by each driver's second-fastest lap time in session one; Van Langendonck took pole position for races one and three, and started fifth in race two after not setting a second time.) before claiming second to Rocco Coronel in race two—solidifying his championship lead—and dropping outside the points in race three after a gamble on slick tyres. He stalled from the front-row in the opener of the wet-weather Portimão round and dropped to twenty-seventh before climbing to seventh in the three racing laps absent of a safety car; he dominated the final two races—the latter from pole—with eight-second margins over Alfie Slater and Oleksandr Savinkov, respectively. A double pole in Valencia was followed by a victory in race one and third in race two, before ending the weekend eighth from twelfth in the closer, extending his championship lead to 61 points. (Note: Due to a weather alert for strong winds and a subsequent rescheduling at Valencia, the grid for race three was set by each driver's fastest lap in race two.) He clinched both the rookies' and main championships with two victories from three podiums at the penultimate Aragón round, making a switchback move on Thomas Bearman and Arjen Kräling to win the final race. Closing his pre-season with three grands chelems at Barcelona-Catalunya, Van Langendonck achieved a record nine victories from 12 podiums and nine pole positions in the 15-race Winter Series, scoring 308 points—149 clear of Bearman in second.

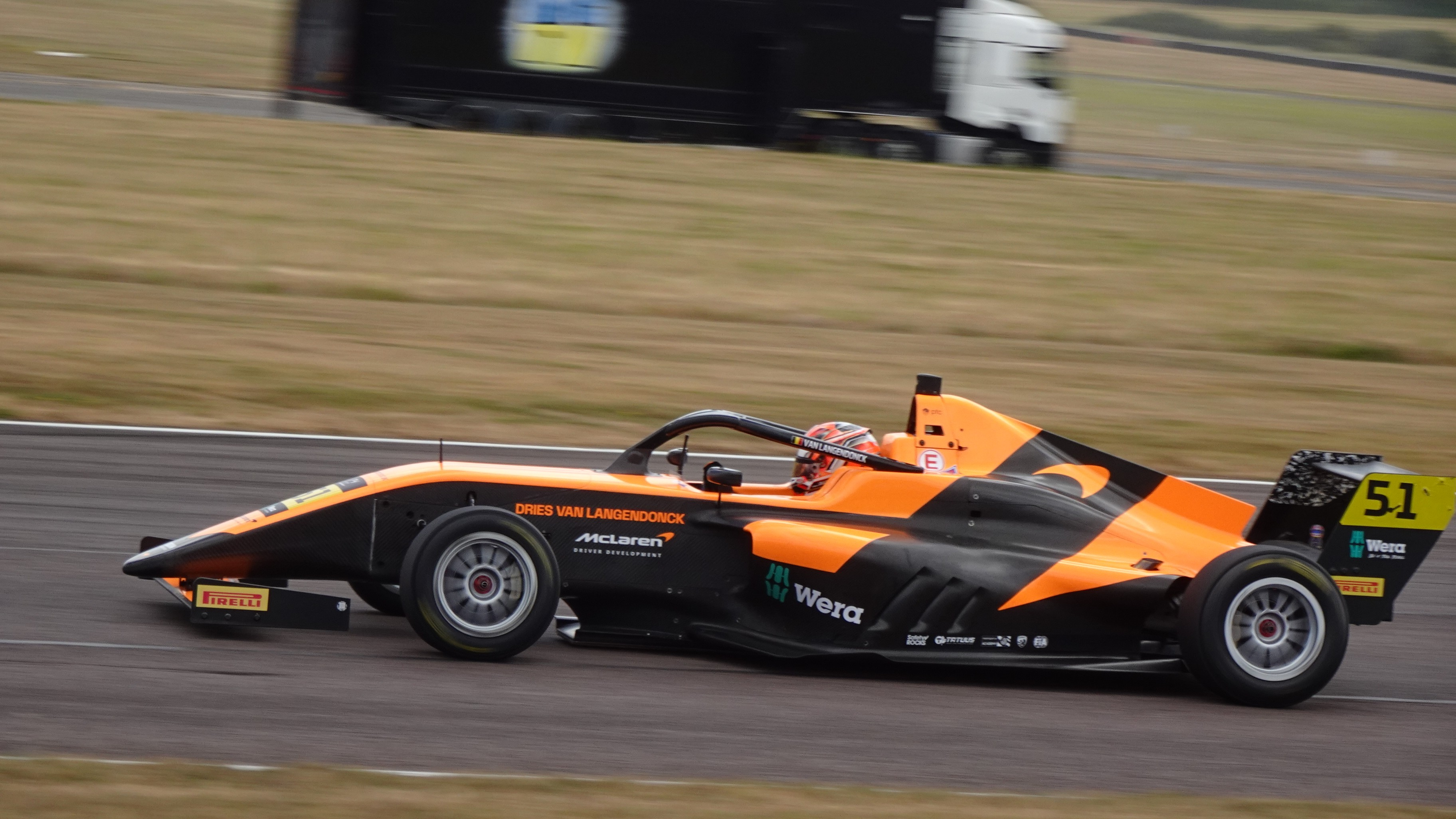
Van Langendonck entered the F4 British Championship as a favourite for the title.

Van Langendonck remained with Rodin for his rookie season in British F4. Ahead of the season, Marc Cornelissen of Het Belang van Limburg described him as "the greatest promise that Belgian motorsport has ever known". His campaign opened with a double pole at Donington Park National, where he converted a lights-to-flag victory in the first race, climbed to fourth in the reverse-grid second, and was penalised from victory in the third for ostensibly taking out Theo Palmer. Rodin's early-season struggles with understeer emerged at Brands Hatch Indy, where Van Langendonck took seventh in the opening two races before a gamble on slick tyres in changing conditions saw him overtake 21 drivers to win the finale. His championship lead extended to 29 points over Lewis Wherrell with two podiums at Snetterton. Van Langendonck dropped from third to sixteenth with a penalty in the opener at Silverstone Grand Prix, retired amidst first-lap melee in race two, and finished fifth in the showpiece BRDC International Trophy, falling behind Wherrell in the standings. He dominated the Zandvoort weekend with two victories to reclaim the championship lead, after which he was announced as the first protégé of Max Verstappen.

=== Formula One ===
In July 2024, Van Langendonck joined the McLaren Driver Development Programme, aged 13, in a parallel move to that of Lewis Hamilton 26 years prior, another young kart racer with minimal funding. He later revealed that he had received offers from Alpine, Aston Martin, and Williams following his victory in the 2023 OK-Junior World Championship. Under the wing of Warren Hughes, Van Langendonck has undergone several junior formulae tests and simulator sessions. He had previously been offered Formula 4 tests by the Red Bull Junior Team, but refused so he could continue his karting career. He is under contract with McLaren until at least 2031. His association with four-time World Drivers' Champion Max Verstappen began in July 2026, when Van Langendonck became the first junior member of Verstappen Racing, offering simulator support and personal guidance from Verstappen on his pathway to Formula One.

I would only do it with drivers in whom I genuinely see great potential. Drivers this good do not come along every year. That is why [Van Langendonck] is really the first one for me. He definitely has a lot of potential to succeed.

— Max Verstappen explaining his decision to sign Van Langendonck with Autosport in 2026

== Other racing ==
=== Sim racing ===
To account for missed track-time due to a lack of funding in his junior career, Van Langendonck began sim racing. He is one of the top-ranked iRacing drivers in the world, where he finished third in the Spa 24 Hours and the 6 Hours of Watkins Glen Special Events—both virtual team endurance races—with Drago Racing in 2025, before winning the first European round of the FIA F4 Global Esports Championship. His teammates at Drago included fellow McLaren-signed youngsters Taylor Barnard and Alex Dunne. The following year, he set the fastest lap on his way to winning the 24 Hours of Daytona Special Event, regarded as the most prestigious iRacing event. He joined Verstappen Racing that July, upgrading from his private home simulator to Verstappen's facilities in Tilburg, Netherlands.

I have a simulator here at home. You learn a lot that you can use in real racing. It is very competitive, and the others are often faster because they have a lot more experience than me: those guys train for hours every day, and their level is abnormally high. [Max Verstappen] said earlier that he finds sim racing almost more difficult than real racing. It is hard work and good training.

— Van Langendonck discussing sim racing as a training tool with Humo in 2026

== Awards and honours ==
- IKR Driver of the Year: 2024

== Karting record ==
=== Karting career summary ===
Season	Series	Team	Position
2018	RMC Golden Trophy — Micro Max	GKS Lemmens Power	17th
2019	BNL Karting Series — Micro Max	GKS Lemmens Power	5th
2019	Rotax Max Challenge Belgium — Micro Max	GKS Lemmens Power	6th
2019	Dutch Championship — Rookie	GKS Lemmens Power	1st
2020	Dutch Open Winter 2T Series — Micro Max	GKS Lemmens Power	3rd
2020	WSK Euro Series — 60 Mini	Birel ART Racing	48th
2020	ROK Cup Superfinal — Mini ROK	Leclerc by Lennox Racing	9th
2020	Andrea Margutti Trophy — 60 Mini	Manetti Motorsport	9th
2020	WSK Open Cup — 60 Mini	Leclerc by Lennox Racing	15th
2020	Trofeo Ayrton Senna — 60 Mini	Manetti Motorsport	10th
2020	Dutch Championship — 60 Mini	Paauwer Racing	1st
2021	WSK Champions Cup — 60 Mini	Birel ART Racing	6th
2021	WSK Super Master Series — 60 Mini	Birel ART Racing	13th
2021	WSK Euro Series — 60 Mini	Birel ART Racing	12th
2021	Jesolo Trophy — X30 Mini		1st
2021	Italian Championship — Mini Gr.3		3rd
2021	WSK Open Cup — 60 Mini	Parolin Motorsport	7th
2021	ROK Cup Superfinal — Mini ROK	AV Racing	2nd
2021	Trofeo delle Industrie — 60 Mini	Parolin Motorsport	19th
2021	South Garda Winter Cup — Mini ROK	AV Racing	2nd
2021	WSK Final Cup — 60 Mini	Parolin Motorsport	4th
2022	WSK Champions Cup — 60 Mini	Parolin Motorsport	4th
2022	WSK Super Master Series — 60 Mini	Parolin Motorsport	4th
2022	Andrea Margutti Trophy — 60 Mini	Parolin Motorsport	1st
2022	Italian Championship — Mini Gr.3		4th
2022	WSK Euro Series — 60 Mini	Parolin Motorsport	10th
2022	CIK-FIA World Championship — OK-J	Energy Corse	7th
2022	WSK Open Cup — OK-J	Energy Corse	32nd
2022	Trofeo delle Industrie — OK-J	Energy Corse	21st
2022	WSK Final Cup — OK-J	Energy Corse	16th
2023	WSK Champions Cup — OK-J	Energy Corse	9th
2023	WSK Super Master Series — OK-J	Energy Corse	5th
2023	CIK-FIA European Championship — OK-J	Energy Corse	5th
2023	Champions of the Future — OK-J	Energy Corse	2nd
2023	CIK-FIA World Championship — OK-J	Forza Racing	1st
2023	Trofeo delle Industrie — OK-J	Forza Racing	9th
2023	WSK Euro Series — OK-J	Forza Racing	14th
2023	WSK Final Cup — OK-J	Forza Racing	1st
2023	International Karting Ranking		2nd
2023	International Karting Ranking — OK-J		2nd
2024	WSK Champions Cup — OK-J	Forza Racing	2nd
2024	WSK Super Master Series — OK-J	Forza Racing	2nd
2024	WSK Euro Series — OK-J	Forza Racing	7th
2024	Champions of the Future — OK-J	Forza Racing	1st
2024	CIK-FIA European Championship — OK-J	Forza Racing	1st
2024	Champions of the Future — OK	Forza Racing	24th
2024	CIK-FIA World Championship — OK	Forza Racing	22nd
2024	WSK Final Cup — OK	Forza Racing	1st
2024	International Karting Ranking		1st
2024	International Karting Ranking — OK-J		1st
2025	WSK Super Master Series — OK	Prema Racing	1st
2025	CIK-FIA European Championship — OK	Prema Racing	8th
2025	Champions of the Future — OK	Prema Racing	17th
2025	International Karting Ranking		19th
2025	International Karting Ranking — OK		6th
Source: (Note: Additional references are stated in § Karting (2018–2025).)

=== Complete CIK-FIA results ===
==== Complete CIK-FIA World Championship results ====
Year	Entrant	Class	Circuit	QH	SH	F
2022	Energy Corse	OK-J	(Italy) Sarno	13th	10th	7th
2023	Forza Racing	OK-J	(Italy) Franciacorta	4th	3rd	1st
2024	Forza Racing	OK	(United Kingdom) PF International	5th	9th	Ret (Note: Did not finish, but was classified 22nd.)

==== Complete CIK-FIA European Championship results ====
(key) (Races in bold indicate pole position; races in italics indicate fastest lap)

Year	Entrant	Class	1	2	3	4	5	6	7	8	9	10	11	12	Pos	Points
2023	Energy Corse	OK-J	VAL; QH; 13	VAL; SH; 15	VAL; F 35†	TŘI; QH; 3	TŘI; SH; 4	TŘI; F 5	RØD; QH; 10	RØD; SH; 6	RØD; F 7	CRE; QH; 2	CRE; SH; 3	CRE; F 4	5th	147
2024	Forza Racing	OK-J	**VAL**; **QH**; 2	VAL; SH; 2	VAL; F 1	ARG; QH; 7	ARG; SH; 6	ARG; F 2	SVK; QH; 2	SVK; SH; 1	**SVK**; **F** 1	**KRI**; **QH**; 4	KRI; SH; 3	KRI; F 2	1st	339
2025	Prema Racing	OK	CAM; QH; 5	CAM; SH; 3	CAM; F 2	POR; QH; 23	POR; SH; 17	POR; F 7	VIT; QH	VIT; SH	VIT; F	RØD; QH	RØD; SH	RØD; F	8th	100

^{†} Did not finish, but was classified as he had completed at least one lap.

== Racing record ==
=== Racing career summary ===
Season	Series	Team	Races	Wins	Poles	F/Laps	Podiums	Points	Position
2025	F4 British Championship	Rodin Motorsport	9	1	1	0	1	38	21st
2026	Formula Winter Series	Rodin Motorsport	15	9	9	8	12	308	1st
2026	F4 British Championship	Rodin Motorsport	27	8	8	5	12	344	1st
2026	FIA F4 World Cup	Prema Racing	2	0	0	0	0	—N/a	12th

=== Complete F4 British Championship results ===
(key) (Races in bold indicate pole position; races in italics indicate fastest lap; ^{superscript} indicates points for positions gained)

Year	Entrant	1	2	3	4	5	6	7	8	9	10	11	12	13	14	15	16	17	18	19	20	21	22	23	24	25	26	27	28	29	30	Pos	Points
2025	Rodin Motorsport	DPN; 1	DPN; 2	DPN; 3	SILGP; 1	SILGP; 2	SILGP; 3	SNE; 1	SNE; 2	SNE; 3	THR; 1	THR; 2	THR; 3	OUL; 1	OUL; 2	OUL; 3	ZAN; 1	ZAN; 2	ZAN; 3	KNO; 1	KNO; 2	KNO; 3	DPGP; 1; 14	DPGP; 2; 9^{3}	**DPGP**; **3**; 1	SILN; 1 DSQ	SILN; 2; 20	SILN; 3; 7	BRH; 1; 14	BRH; 2; 6	BRH; 3; 5	21st	38
2026	Rodin Motorsport	**DPN**; **1**; 1	DPN; 2; 4^{8}	**DPN**; **3**; 4	BHI; 1; 7	BHI; 2; 7	BHI; 3; 1	SNE; 1; 3	SNE; 2; 3^{4}	SNE; 3; 7	SILGP; 1; 16	SILGP; 2 Ret	SILGP; 3; 5	**ZAN**; **1**; 1	ZAN; 2; 9^{3}	**ZAN**; **3**; 1	THR; 1 Ret	THR; 2 NC	THR; 3; 3	DPGP; 1	DPGP; 2	DPGP; 3	**CRO**; **1**; 1	CRO; 2; 6^{6}	**CRO**; **3**; 1	**SILN**; **1**; 1	SILN; 2; 6^{6}	**SILN**; **3**; 1	BHGP; 1; 2	BHGP; 2; 11	BHGP; 3; 7	1st	344 (Note: Van Langendonck was deducted three points.)

=== Complete Formula Winter Series results ===
(key) (Races in bold indicate pole position; races in italics indicate fastest lap)

Year	Entrant	1	2	3	4	5	6	7	8	9	10	11	12	13	14	15	Pos	Points
2026	Rodin Motorsport	**EST**; **1**; 1	EST; 2; 2	**EST**; **3**; 22	POR; 1; 7	POR; 2; 1	**POR**; **3**; 1	**CRT**; **1**; 1	**CRT**; **2**; 3	CRT; 3; 8	ARA; 1; 2	ARA; 2; 1	**ARA**; **3**; 1	**CAT**; **1**; 1	**CAT**; **2**; 1	**CAT**; **3**; 1	1st	308

=== Complete FIA F4 World Cup results ===
Year	Entrant	Car	Qualifying	Quali race	Main race
2026	(Italy) Prema Racing	Tatuus F4-T421	2nd	DNF	12th

== Notes ==
Sporting positions
Preceded by Gabriel Gomez	Formula Winter Series; Champion; 2026	Succeeded by Incumbent
Preceded by Fionn McLaughlin	F4 British Championship; Champion; 2026	Succeeded by Incumbent
Awards
Preceded by Lewis Wherrell	International Karting Ranking; Driver of the Year; 2024	Succeeded by Noah Baglin
Records
