= Arjen Kräling =

German racing driver (born 2010)

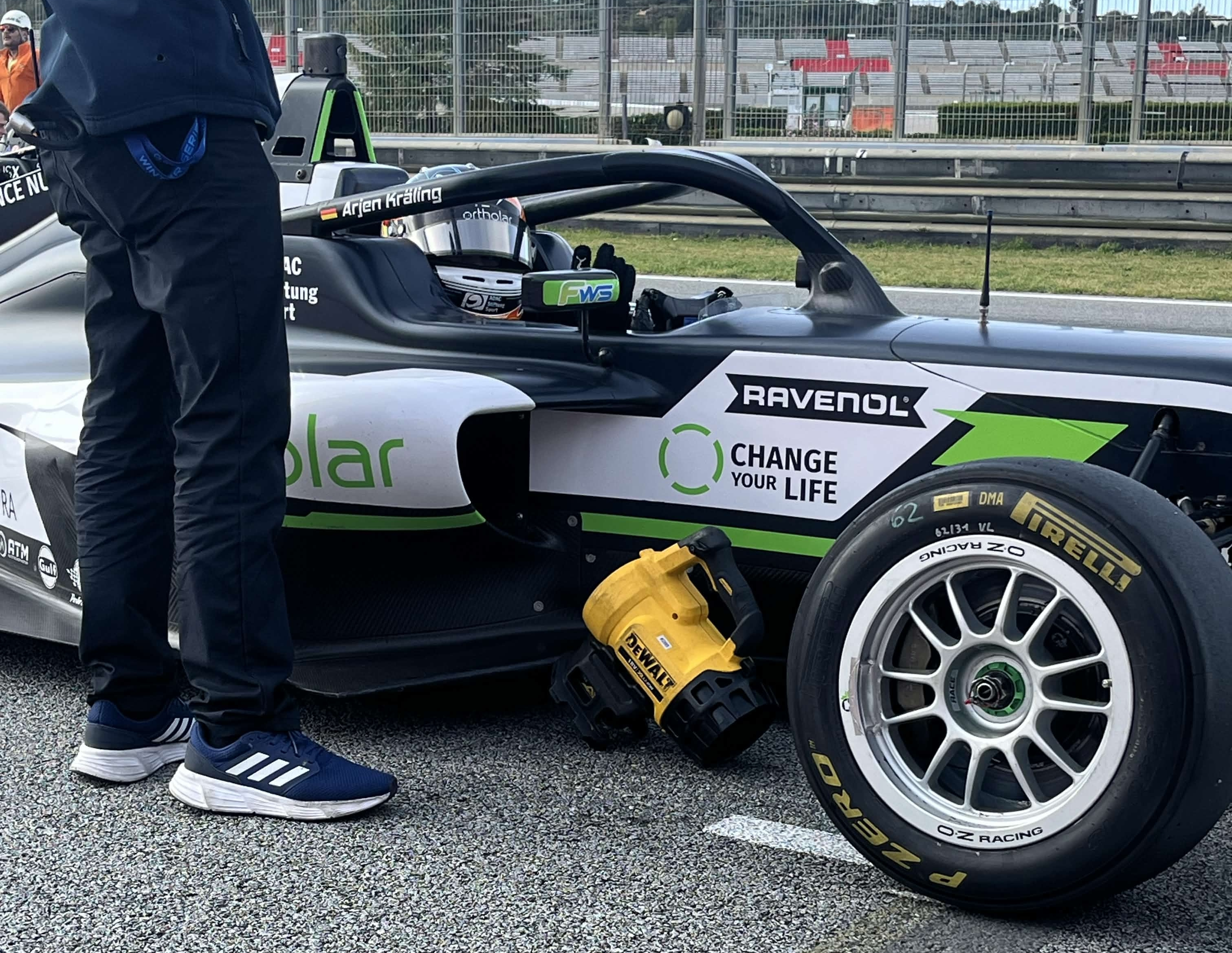
- Kräling in 2026
- Nationality: (Germany) German
- Born: 24 July 2010 (age 16) Winterberg, Germany

GB3 Championship career
- Debut season: 2026
- Current team: TJ Speed Motorsports
- Car number: 36
- Starts: 2
- Wins: 0
- Podiums: 0
- Poles: 0
- Fastest laps: 0
- Best finish: NC in 2026

Previous series
- 2026 2026 2025–2026 2025 2025–2026: Italian F4; Formula Winter Series; E4; GB4; F4 British
- Statistics up to date as of 18 November 2026.

Arjen Kräling (born 24 July 2010) is a German racing driver who last competed in the GB3 Championship for TJ Speed Motorsports.

== Personal life ==
Kräling is the son of Frank Kräling, a former amateur racing driver who finished fifth overall at the 2008 24 Hours of Nürburgring.

== Career ==
=== Karting (2020–2024) ===
Born in Winterberg, Kräling initially took up skiing in his early years, before making his karting debut in 2020 in the final round of RMC Clubsport in the Micro Max class. Making his full-season debut the following year, Kräling finished third in the Micro Max standings, as well as making his international debut for CRG Racing Team in the WSK Final Cup's 60 Mini category. Continuing in mini karts for 2022, Kräling raced for Alonso Kart by Kidix in his first full season in international racing, in which he most notably was runner-up to Dean Hoogendoorn in ADAC Kart Masters.

Moving up to junior karts in 2023, Kräling most notably finished fourth in the Italian Karting Championship standings for Kidix and 11th in the Karting World Championship for KR Motorsport. Remaining in junior karts for 2024, Kräling most notably finished ninth in the Champions of the Future Euro Series and eighth in the Karting World Championship. During 2024, Kräling represented Germany in the FIA Motorsport Games Sprint Cup Junior discipline, and also finished eighth in the WSK Euro Series standings.

=== Formula 4 (2025–2026) ===
In 2025, Kräling began testing Formula 4 machinery for Phinsys by Argenti, before joining them for his single-seater debut in the final five rounds of the F4 British Championship. After finishing 11th on debut at Zandvoort, Kräling scored a best result of sixth in race two at Donington Park en route to a 26th-place points finish. During 2025, Kräling made a one-off appearance in GB4 for Douglas Motorsport at Silverstone, finishing third in race two, as well as the final two rounds of E4 for US Racing, in which he took a best result of seventh in race three at Monza.

Continuing with US Racing for 2026, Kräling joined them to race in the Formula Winter Series, in which he took his first career win in race three at Valencia from pole position to take eighth in the overall standings. Following that, Kräling remained with them for a dual campaign in the Italian F4 and E4 Championships. In Italian F4, Kräling took a lone podium at Vallelunga and was 20th in points, whereas in E4, he was 15th in overall points with a best result of fourth in the first two races at Vallelunga.

=== Formula Regional (2026–present) ===
In late 2026, Kräling joined TJ Speed Motorsports to make his GB3 debut in the Barcelona finale, before joining them for the following year's Formula Regional Oceania Trophy.

== Karting record ==
=== Karting career summary ===
Season	Series	Team	Position
2020	RMC Clubsport — Micro Max	Nees Racing	
2021	RMC Clubsport — Micro Max	Nees Racing	3rd
2021	Trofeo Delle Industrie — 60 Mini	Nees Racing	NC
2021	WSK Final Cup — 60 Mini	CRG Racing Team	NC
2022	WSK Super Master Series — 60 Mini	Alonso Kart by Kidix	79th
2022	Andrea Margutti Trophy — 60 Mini	Alonso Kart by Kidix	18th
2022	Italian Karting Championship — Mini Gr.3	Alonso Kart by Kidix	40th
2022	ADAC Kart Masters — 60 Mini	Alonso Kart by Kidix	2nd
2022	WSK Euro Series — 60 Mini	Alonso Kart by Kidix	28th
2022	WSK Super Cup — 60 Mini	Alonso Kart by Kidix	32nd
2022	WSK Open Cup — 60 Mini	Alonso Kart by Kidix	31st
2022	WSK Final Cup — 60 Mini	Alonso Kart by Kidix	65th
2023	WSK Champions Cup — OK-J	KR Motorsport	15th
2023	WSK Super Master Series — OK-J	KR Motorsport	47th
2023	Champions of the Future Euro Series — OK-J	KR Motorsport	26th
2023	Karting European Championship — OK-J	KR Motorsport	23rd
2023	IAME Euro Series — X30 Junior		75th
2023	Deutsche Kart-Meisterschaft — OK-J		NC
2023	Italian Karting Championship — OK-J	Kidix Driver Performance	4th
2023	WSK Euro Series — OK-J	KR Motorsport	32nd
2023	Karting World Championship — OK-J	KR Motorsport	11th
2023	WSK Final Cup — OK-J	KR Motorsport	19th
2024	WSK Champions Cup — OK-J	KR Motorsport	11th
2024	WSK Super Master Series — OK-J	KR Motorsport	16th
2024	Champions of the Future Euro Series — OK-J	KR Motorsport	9th
2024	Karting European Championship — OK-J	KR Motorsport	17th
2024	British Kart Championship — X30 Junior	Argenti Motorsport	15th
2024	FIA Motorsport Games Sprint Cup — Junior	Team Germany	8th
2024	WSK Euro Series — OK-J	KR Motorsport	8th
2024	Rotax Max Euro Trophy — Junior Max	KR Motorsport	43rd
2024	Karting World Championship — OK-J	KR Motorsport	8th
2024	WSK Final Cup — OK-J	KR Motorsport	9th

== Racing record ==
=== Career summary ===
Season	Series	Team	Races	Wins	Poles	F/Laps	Podiums	Points	Position
2025	F4 British Championship	Phinsys by Argenti	15	0	0	0	0	19	26th
2025	GB4 Championship	Douglas Motorsport	3	0	0	0	1	46	24th
2025	E4 Championship	US Racing	6	0	0	0	0	6	17th
2026	Formula Winter Series	US Racing	15	1	1	3	1	74	8th
2026	Italian F4 Championship	US Racing	18	0	0	1	1	117	20th
2026	E4 Championship	US Racing	9	0	0	0	0	47	15th
2026	F4 British Championship	Argenti Motorsport	3	0	0	0	0	5	38th
2026	GB3 Championship	TJ Speed Motorsports	2	0	0	0	0	0	NC†
2027	Formula Regional Oceania Trophy	TJ Speed Motorsports	0	0	0	0	0	0	TBD

* Season still in progress.

=== Complete F4 British Championship results ===
(key) (Races in bold indicate pole position) (Races in italics indicate fastest lap; ^{superscript} indicates points for positions gained)

Year	Entrant	1	2	3	4	5	6	7	8	9	10	11	12	13	14	15	16	17	18	19	20	21	22	23	24	25	26	27	28	29	30	31	32	Pos	Points
2025	Phinsys by Argenti	DPN; 1	DPN; 2	DPN; 3	SILGP; 1	SILGP; 2	SILGP; 3	SNE; 1	SNE; 2	SNE; 3	THR; 1	THR; 2	THR; 3	OUL; 1	OUL; 2	OUL; 3	SILGP; 1	SILGP; 2	ZAN; 1; 11	ZAN; 2; 13^{2}	ZAN; 3; 19	KNO; 1; 17	KNO; 2; 16^{3}	KNO; 3; 15	DPGP; 1; 12	DPGP; 2; 6	DPGP; 3; 10	SILN; 1; 15	SILN; 2; 10^{9}	SILN; 3; 23	BHGP; 1; 11	BHGP; 2; 15	BHGP; 3; 22	26th	19
2026	Argenti Motorsport	DPN; 1	DPN; 2	DPN; 3	BHI; 1	BHI; 2	BHI; 3	SNE; 1	SNE; 2	SNE; 3	SILGP; 1	SILGP; 2	SILGP; 3	ZAN; 1	ZAN; 2	ZAN; 3	THR; 1	THR; 2	THR; 3	DPGP; 1	DPGP; 2	DPGP; 3	CRO; 1	CRO; 2	CRO; 3	SILN; 1; 9	SILN; 2; 8	SILN; 3; 9	BHGP; 1	BHGP; 2	BHGP; 3			38th	5

=== Complete GB4 Championship results ===
(key) (Races in bold indicate pole position) (Races in italics indicate fastest lap; ^{superscript} indicates points for positions gained)

Year	Entrant	1	2	3	4	5	6	7	8	9	10	11	12	13	14	15	16	17	18	19	20	21	22	Pos	Points
2025	Douglas Motorsport	DON; 1	DON; 2	DON; 3	SIL1; 1	SIL1; 2	SIL1; 3	OUL; 1	OUL; 2	OUL; 3	SNE; 1	SNE; 2	SNE; 3	SIL2; 1; 5	SIL2; 2; 3	SIL2; 3; 13	BRH; 1	BRH; 2	BRH; 3	DON2; 1	DON2; 2	DON2; 3	DON2; 4	24th	46

=== Complete E4 Championship results ===
(key) (Races in bold indicate pole position) (Races in italics indicate fastest lap)

Year	Entrant	1	2	3	4	5	6	7	8	9	Pos	Points
2025	US Racing	LEC; 1	LEC; 2	LEC; 3	MUG; 1; 16	MUG; 2; 17	MUG; 3; 31	MNZ; 1; 13	MNZ; 2; 27	MNZ; 3; 7	17th	6
2026	US Racing	VLL; 1; 4	VLL; 2; 4	VLL; 3; 32†	LEC; 1; 15	LEC; 2; 18	LEC; 3; 12	MNZ; 1 Ret	MNZ; 2 Ret	MNZ; 3; 29	15th	47

=== Complete Formula Winter Series results ===
(key) (Races in bold indicate pole position; races in italics indicate fastest lap)

Year	Entrant	1	2	3	4	5	6	7	8	9	10	11	12	13	14	15	Pos	Points
2026	US Racing	EST; 1; 6	EST; 2; 27	EST; 3; 13	POR; 1; 18	POR; 2; 15	POR; 3; 12	CRT; 1; 19	CRT; 2; 29†	**CRT**; **3**; 1	ARA; 1; 23	ARA; 2; 7	ARA; 3; 4	CAT; 1; 7	CAT; 2; 8	CAT; 3; 5	8th	74

=== Complete Italian F4 Championship results ===
(key) (Races in bold indicate pole position; races in italics indicate fastest lap)

Year	Team	1	2	3	4	5	6	7	8	9	10	11	12	13	14	15	16	17	18	19	20	21	22	23	24	25	26	27	28	DC	Points
2026	US Racing	MIS1; 1; 5	MIS1; 2; 6	MIS1; 3	MIS1; 4; 8	VLL; 1	VLL; 2; 3	VLL; 3; 22	VLL; 4; 10	MNZ; 1	MNZ; 2; 7	MNZ; 3; 4	MNZ; 4; 32†	MUG1; 1; 18	MUG1; 2; 31	MUG1; 3	MUG1; 4 Ret	IMO; 1 Ret	IMO; 2; 15	IMO; 3	IMO; 4; 16	MIS2; 1	MIS2; 2; 13	MIS2; 3; 17	MIS2; 4; 15	MUG2; 1	MUG2; 2	MUG2; 3	MUG2; 4	20th	117

=== Complete GB3 Championship results ===
(key) (Races in bold indicate pole position) (Races in italics indicate fastest lap; ^{superscript} indicates points for positions gained)

Year	Entrant	1	2	3	4	5	6	7	8	9	10	11	12	13	14	15	16	17	18	19	20	21	22	23	24	Pos	Points
2026	TJ Speed Motorsports	SIL1; 1	SIL1; 2	SIL1; 3	SPA; 1	SPA; 2	SPA; 3	HUN; 1	HUN; 2	HUN; 3	RBR; 1	RBR; 2	RBR; 3	SIL2; 1	SIL2; 2	SIL2; 3	DON; 1	DON; 2	DON; 3	BRH; 1	BRH; 2	BRH; 3	CAT; 1 DNS	CAT; 2; 14	CAT; 3; 13^{10}	NC†	0

^{†} As Kräling was a guest driver, he was ineligible to score points.
