= Zoe Florescu Potolea =

Romanian and American racing driver (born 2008)

- Florescu in 2026
- Nationality: (Romania) Romanian (United States) American
- Born: 23 December 2008 (age 17) Bucharest, Romania

Zoe Florescu Potolea (born 23 December 2008) is a Romanian and American racing driver who last competed in the F4 Spanish Championship for Tecnicar by Amtog.

== Career ==
=== Karting (2016–2025) ===
Florescu Potolea had her first taste of karting in 2016, before making her competitive debut in mini karts two years later in the Romanian Karting Masters. After two years in mini karts with Real Racing, Florescu Potolea stepped up to junior karts with them in 2021, before joining Birel ART Racing for her second year in the category. At the end of 2022, Florescu Potolea won the FIA Girls on Track – Rising Stars junior shootout, earning her a seat at Tony Kart Racing Team for her step-up to senior karts in 2023, with support from the Ferrari Driver Academy. After her only season in the category and Tony Kart, Florescu Potolea moved up to KZ2 in 2024, primarily racing for Birel ART Racing for the next two seasons.

=== Formula 4 (2025–) ===
During her first year of senior karting in 2023, Florescu Potolea began testing Formula 4 machinery. Towards the end of 2025, Florescu Potolea participated in the F1 Academy rookie test at Navarra, setting the eighth fastest time in the morning and the tenth fastest time in the afternoon.

At the start of 2026, Florescu Potolea became part of the More than Equal project, as well as running a part-time campaign for Campos Racing in the Formula Winter Series, where she took a best result of 17th in race two at Valencia. However, her main campaign during the winter was with Tecnicar by Amtog in the Eurocup-4 Spanish Winter Championship, where she scored a best result of 13th in race two at Algarve. For the rest of the year, Florescu Potolea remained with Tecnicar to compete in the F4 Spanish Championship, in which she took a best result of 13th at Aragón and Jerez. During 2026, Florescu Potolea also joined Hitech to make a wildcard appearance at the Zandvoort round of F1 Academy with the support of Unilever brand Dirt Is Good, as well as a one-off outing in Italian F4 with Real Racing.

== Karting record ==
=== Karting career summary ===
Season	Series	Team	Position
2019	Romanian Karting Masters – Mini Rok	Real Racing	12th
2019	Rok Cup Superfinal – Mini Rok	Real Racing	61st
2020	South Garda Winter Cup – 60 Mini	Real Racing	64th
2020	WSK Euro Series – 60 Mini	Real Racing	58th
2020	Romanian Karting Masters – Mini Rok	Real Racing	13th
2020	Rok Cup International Final – Mini Rok	Real Racing	NC
2021	WSK Super Master Series – OK-J	Real Racing	108th
2021	Andrea Margutti Trophy – X30 Junior	Real Racing	NC
2021	Italian Karting Championship – X30 Junior	Real Racing	71st
2021	WSK Euro Series – OK-J	Real Racing	118th
2021	WSK Open Cup – OK-J	Real Racing	71st
2021	Romanian Karting Masters – Junior Rok	Real Racing	4th
2021	South Garda Winter Cup – OK-J	Birel ART Racing	NC
2022	WSK Super Master Series – OK-J	Birel ART Racing	58th
2022	Champions of the Future Winter Series – OK-J	Birel ART Racing	74th
2022	Champions of the Future – OK-J	Birel ART Racing	57th
2022	Karting European Championship – OK-J	Birel ART Racing	65th
2022	WSK Euro Series – OK-J	Birel ART Racing	51st
2022	Italian Karting Championship – OK-J	Birel ART Racing	NC
2022	Karting World Championship – OK-J	Birel ART Racing	84th
2022	WSK Final Cup – OK-J	Birel ART Racing	71st
2023	WSK Super Master Series – OK	Tony Kart Racing Team	59th
2023	Champions of the Future Euro Series – OK	Tony Kart Racing Team	65th
2023	Karting European Championship – OK	Tony Kart Racing Team	92nd
2023	WSK Euro Series – OK	Tony Kart Racing Team	45th
2023	Karting World Championship – OK	Tony Kart Racing Team	75th
2023	WSK Final Cup – OK	Leclerc by Lennox Racing Team	56th
2024	WSK Super Master Series – KZ2	KCS Racing	60th
2024	Andrea Margutti Trophy – KZ2	KCS Racing	NC
2024	WSK Open Series – KZ2	Birel ART Racing	30th
2024	Karting European Championship – KZ2	Birel ART Racing	56th
2024	Champions of the Future Shifters – KZ2	Birel ART Racing	NC
2024	Karting World Cup – KZ2	Birel ART Racing	89th
2024	WSK Final Cup – KZ2	KCS Racing	18th
2025	WSK Super Master Series – KZ2	KCS Racing; Birel ART Racing (Note: Florescu competed for KCS Racing in round 1 and for Birel ART Racing in rounds 2–5.)	19th
2025	Karting European Championship – KZ2	Birel ART Racing	65th
2025	Champions of the Future Shifters – KZ2	Birel ART Racing	70th
2025	Karting World Cup – KZ2	Birel ART Racing	25th

== Racing record ==
=== Career summary ===
Season	Series	Team	Races	Wins	Poles	F/Laps	Podiums	Points	Position
2026	Formula Winter Series	Campos Racing	6	0	0	0	0	0	39th
2026	Eurocup-4 Spanish Winter Championship	Tecnicar by Amtog	9	0	0	0	0	0	28th
2026	F4 Spanish Championship	Tecnicar by Amtog	18	0	0	0	0	0	27th
2026	F1 Academy	Hitech	2	0	0	0	0	0	21st
2026	Italian F4 Championship	Real Racing	2	0	0	0	0	0	69th

* Season still in progress.

=== Complete Formula Winter Series results ===
(key) (Races in bold indicate pole position; races in italics indicate fastest lap)

Year	Entrant	1	2	3	4	5	6	7	8	9	10	11	12	13	14	15	DC	Points
2026	Campos Racing	EST; 1	EST; 2	EST; 3	POR; 1 Ret	POR; 2; 22	POR; 3; 20	CRT; 1 Ret	CRT; 2; 17	CRT; 3; 21	ARA; 1	ARA; 2	ARA; 3	CAT; 1	CAT; 2	CAT; 3	39th	0

=== Complete Eurocup-4 Spanish Winter Championship results ===
(key) (Races in bold indicate pole position; races in italics indicate fastest lap)

Year	Entrant	1	2	3	4	5	6	7	8	9	Pos	Points
2026	Tecnicar by Amtog	POR; 1; 17	POR; SPR; 27†	POR; 2; 13	JAR; 1; 22	JAR; SPR; 28	JAR; 2 Ret	ARA; 1; 21	ARA; SPR; 23	ARA; 2; 19	28th	0

=== Complete F4 Spanish Championship results ===
(key) (Races in bold indicate pole position; races in italics indicate fastest lap)

Year	Entrant	1	2	3	4	5	6	7	8	9	10	11	12	13	14	15	16	17	18	19	20	21	Pos	Points
2026	Tecnicar by Amtog	CRT; 1 Ret	CRT; 2; 15	CRT; 3; 14	POR; 1; 23	POR; 2; 21	POR; 3; 27†	ARA; 1; 13	ARA; 2; 29	ARA; 3; 24	JAR; 1	JAR; 2	JAR; 3	JER; 1; 28	JER; 2 Ret	JER; 3; 19	NAV; 1; 13	NAV; 2; 32	NAV; 3; 25	CAT; 1; 18	CAT; 2; 15	CAT; 3; 27	27th	0

=== Complete Italian F4 Championship results ===
(key) (Races in bold indicate pole position; races in italics indicate fastest lap)

Year	Team	1	2	3	4	5	6	7	8	9	10	11	12	13	14	15	16	17	18	19	20	21	22	23	24	25	26	27	28	DC	Points
2026	Real Racing	MIS1; 1	MIS1; 2	MIS1; 3	MIS1; 4	VLL; 1	VLL; 2	VLL; 3	VLL; 4	MNZ; 1	MNZ; 2	MNZ; 3	MNZ; 4	MUG1; 1	MUG1; 2; 24	MUG1; 3; 29†	MUG1; 4 DNQ	IMO; 1	IMO; 2	IMO; 3	IMO; 4	MIS2; 1	MIS2; 2	MIS2; 3	MIS2; 4	MUG2; 1	MUG2; 2	MUG2; 3	MUG2; 4	69th	0

=== Complete F1 Academy results ===
(key) (Races in bold indicate pole position; races in italics indicate points for the fastest lap of the points finishers)

Year	Entrant	1	2	3	4	5	6	7	8	9	10	11	12	13	14	Pos	Points
2026	Hitech	SHA; 1	SHA; 2	MTL; 1	MTL; 2	MTL; 3	SIL; 1	SIL; 2	ZAN; 1; 11	ZAN; 2; 18	COA; 1	COA; 2	COA; 3	LVG; 1	LVG; 2	20th*	0*

* Season still in progress.
