= Thomas Bearman =

British racing driver (born 2009)

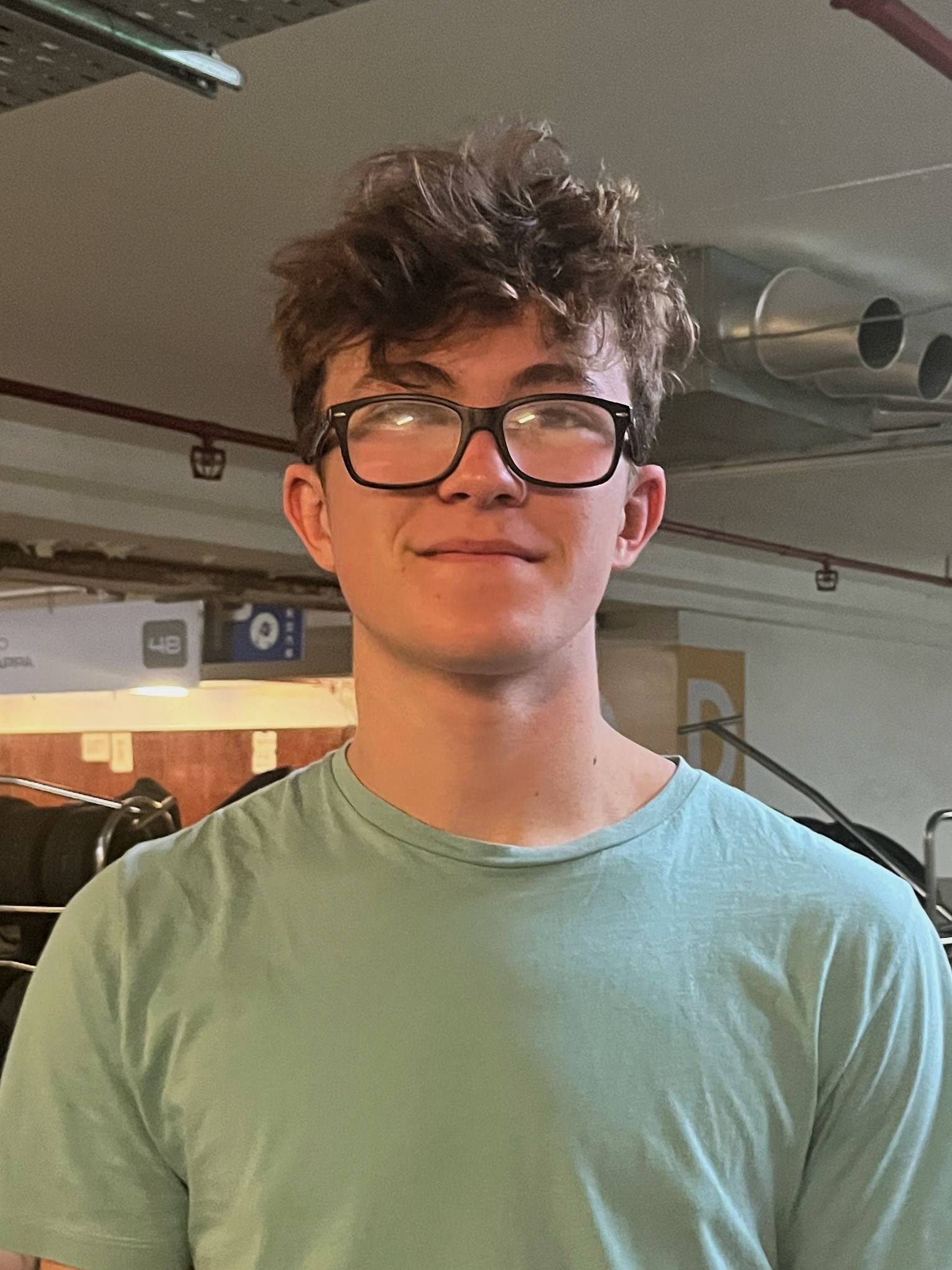
- Bearman in 2025
- Nationality: (United Kingdom) British
- Born: Thomas David Bearman; 7 August 2009 (age 17) Chelmsford, Essex, England
- Relatives: Oliver Bearman (brother)

Italian F4 Championship career
- Debut season: 2026
- Current team: Van Amersfoort Racing
- Car number: 87
- Starts: 21
- Wins: 1
- Podiums: 3
- Poles: 1
- Fastest laps: 0
- Best finish: 1st in 2026

Previous series
- 2025–2026 2024–2025 2024: Formula Winter Series; F4 British; Euro 4

Thomas David Bearman (/bɛərmən/; born 7 August 2009) is a British racing driver who competes in the Italian F4 Championship for Van Amersfoort Racing.

Born and raised in Chelmsford, Bearman is the younger brother of Formula One driver Oliver Bearman. He was a race-winner in the F4 British Championship with Hitech TGR. Bearman is also the 2026 Formula Winter Series runner-up.

== Career ==
=== Karting (2017–2024) ===
Bearman started karting at the age of eight. He did not win any major titles throughout his karting career, with his best result being in sixth in the 2023 British Kart Championship and the RMC Grand Finals.

=== Formula 4 (2024–present) ===
==== 2024 ====
Bearman made his single-seater debut during the second round of the 2024 Euro 4 Championship with Hitech Pulse-Eight. He had a best finish of 20th and did not score any points.

A week later, Bearman would make his bow in the British F4 with Hitech for the final two rounds of the championship. He managed to score one point with a tenth place during the final race in Brands Hatch.

==== 2025 ====
During the 2025 pre-season, Bearman raced for Hitech TGR in the Formula Winter Series. He began with the season with a fifth and fourth place in Portimão, and after two more points finishes in Aragòn, Bearman took his first podium during the final race in Barcelona by finishing second. He finished eighth in the standings, scoring 60 points.

In October 2024, Bearman was signed by Hitech to compete in the full British F4 season.

==== 2026 ====
Bearman switched to Italian F4 with Van Amersfoort Racing in 2026.

== Personal life ==
Bearman's older brother, Oliver, is a fellow racing driver who has competed in Formula One for Ferrari and Haas. His father, David Bearman, is the founder and chief executive officer of the insurance firm Aventum Group.

== Karting record ==
=== Karting career summary ===
Season	Series	Team	Position
2019	Kartmasters British GP — Honda Cadet	Privateer	29th
2020	IAME Winter Cup — X30 Mini	KR Sport	34th
2020	British Kart Championship — X30 Mini	KR Sport	15th
2021	British Kart Championship — X30 Mini	KR Sport	12th
2022	IAME Winter Cup — X30 Junior	KR Sport	36th
2022	Rotax Max Euro Trophy — Junior	Bearman Racing	22nd
2022	British Kart Championship — Rotax Junior	KR Sport	33rd
2022	British O Plate — Rotax Junior	KR Sport	10th
2023	Rotax Max Euro Trophy — Junior Max	KR Sport	8th
2023	British Kart Championship — Junior Rotax	KR Sport	6th
2023	Rotax Mac Challenge International Trophy — Junior	KR Sport	36th
2023	Rotax Max Challenge Grand Finals — Junior	KR Sport	6th
2024	Rotax Max Winter Cup — Senior	KR Sport	35th
2024	British Kart Championship — Junior Rotax	KR Sport	7th
2024	Rotax Max Euro Trophy — Senior	KR Sport	17th

== Racing record ==
=== Racing career summary ===
Season	Series	Team	Races	Wins	Poles	F/Laps	Podiums	Points	Position
2024	Euro 4 Championship	Hitech Pulse-Eight	3	0	0	0	0	0	37th
2024	F4 British Championship	Hitech Pulse-Eight	6	0	0	0	0	1	32nd
2025	Formula Winter Series	Hitech TGR	12	0	0	0	1	60	8th
2025	F4 British Championship	Hitech TGR	30	1	1	1	4	153.5	8th
2025	FIA F4 World Cup		1	0	0	0	0	—N/a	6th
2026	Formula Winter Series	Van Amersfoort Racing	15	0	2	1	8	159	**2nd**
2026	Italian F4 Championship	Van Amersfoort Racing	21	0	0	0	3	216	9th
2026	E4 Championship	Van Amersfoort Racing	9	0	0	0	0	40	17th

^{*} Season still in progress.

=== Complete Euro 4/E4 Championship results ===
(key) (Races in bold indicate pole position; races in italics indicate fastest lap)

Year	Team	1	2	3	4	5	6	7	8	9	DC	Points
2024	Hitech Pulse-Eight	MUG; 1	MUG; 2	MUG; 3	RBR; 1; 20	RBR; 2 Ret	RBR; 3; 23	MNZ; 1	MNZ; 2	MNZ; 3	37th	0
2026	Van Amersfoort Racing	VLL; 1; 27	VLL; 2; 21	VLL; 3; 11	LEC; 1; 16	LEC; 2; 11	LEC; 3; 13	MNZ; 1 Ret	MNZ; 2; 7	MNZ; 3; 12	17th	40

=== Complete F4 British Championship results ===
(key) (Races in bold indicate pole position) (Races in italics indicate fastest lap)

Year	Team	1	2	3	4	5	6	7	8	9	10	11	12	13	14	15	16	17	18	19	20	21	22	23	24	25	26	27	28	29	30	31	32	DC	Points
2024	Hitech Pulse-Eight	DPN; 1	DPN; 2	DPN; 3	BHI; 1	BHI; 2	BHI; 3	SNE; 1	SNE; 2	SNE; 3	THR; 1	THR; 2	THR; 3	SILGP; 1	SILGP; 2	SILGP; 3	ZAN; 1	ZAN; 2	ZAN; 3	KNO; 1	KNO; 2	KNO; 3	DPGP; 1	DPGP; 2	DPGP; 3	DPGP; 4	SILN; 1; 17	SILN; 2 C	SILN; 3 DNS	BHGP; 1; 17	BHGP; 2; 9	BHGP; 3; 16	BHGP; 3; 10	32nd	1
2025	Hitech TGR	DPN; 1; 5	DPN; 2; 4^{2}	DPN; 3; 9	SILGP; 1; 6	SILGP; 2; 4^{2}	SILGP; 3; 7	SNE; 1; 9	SNE; 2; 15^{4}	SNE; 3; 10	THR; 1 Ret	THR; 2; 2	THR; 3 Ret	OUL; 1 Ret	OUL; 2; 5^{3}	OUL; 3; 1	SILGP; 1; 5	SILGP; 2; 3	ZAN; 1 Ret	ZAN; 2; 21	ZAN; 3; 7	KNO; 1; 2	KNO; 2 Ret	**KNO**; **3**; 2	DPGP; 1; 24	DPGP; 2; 5^{1}	DPGP; 3; 20	SILN; 1 Ret	SILN; 2; 11^{4}	SILN; 3; 10	BHGP; 1; 10	BHGP; 2; 4	BHGP; 3; 10	8th	153.5

=== Complete Formula Winter Series results ===
(key) (Races in bold indicate pole position; races in italics indicate fastest lap)

Year	Team	1	2	3	4	5	6	7	8	9	10	11	12	13	14	15	DC	Points
2025	Hitech TGR	POR; 1; 24	POR; 2; 5	POR; 3; 4	CRT; 1; 24†	CRT; 2; 16	CRT; 3; 15	ARA; 1; 6	ARA; 2; 8	ARA; 3; 14	CAT; 1; 23	CAT; 2; 6	CAT; 3; 2				8th	60
2026	Van Amersfoort Racing	EST; 1; 11	EST; 2; 3	EST; 3; 20	POR; 1; 2	POR; 2; 7	POR; 3; 7	CRT; 1; 15	CRT; 2; 2	CRT; 3; 3	**ARA**; **1**; 3	**ARA**; **2**; 3	ARA; 3; 2	CAT; 1; 23	CAT; 2; 2	CAT; 3; 4	2nd	159

=== Complete FIA F4 World Cup results ===
Year	Car	Qualifying	Quali Race	Main Race
2025	Mygale M21-F4	4th	DNF	6th

=== Complete Italian F4 Championship results ===
(key) (Races in bold indicate pole position; races in italics indicate fastest lap)

Year	Team	1	2	3	4	5	6	7	8	9	10	11	12	13	14	15	16	17	18	19	20	21	22	23	24	25	26	27	28	DC	Points
2026	Van Amersfoort Racing	MIS1; 1; 7	MIS1; 2; 9	MIS1; 3	MIS1; 4 Ret	VLL; 1; 9	VLL; 2; 5	VLL; 3	VLL; 4; 7	MNZ; 1; 12	MNZ; 2	MNZ; 3; 2	MNZ; 4; 15	MUG1; 1	MUG1; 2; 7	MUG1; 3; 11	MUG2; 4; 12	IMO; 1; 3	IMO; 2; 4	IMO; 3	IMO; 4; 4	MIS2; 1; 25	MIS2; 2	MIS2; 3; 2	MIS2; 4; 17	MUG2; 1; 29	MUG2; 2; 15	MUG2; 3	MUG2; 4; 31†	9th	216
