= Driver development program =

System designed for young racing drivers to perfect their racing skills

A driver development program, (Note: British English: driver development programme) also known as a driver development team or driver academy, is a system or structure designed to identify and develop talent in auto racing. Programs are typically offered to drivers aged 12 to 25 in junior racing categories—such as kart racing and lower formulae—with the aim of progressing to top-level motorsport series, often devised by racing teams, external companies and sponsors.

Driver development programs involve the scouting, signing and training of driver talent around the world. Racing teams will typically sign young drivers with the intention of eventually graduating them to a senior category with the organisation, such as Formula One, IndyCar or NASCAR. Many teams sign drivers to multi-year contracts, in which they assist in funding their careers in junior formulae—such as kart racing, Formula Three and Formula Two in open-wheel racing, as well as late models and ARCA in stock car racing—to develop their talent and experience. Such contracts may also serve to prevent driver talent from being poached. Many programs now employ a wide range of coaching methods and technologies to train all of the physical and psychological attributes required in high-level motorsport, including full motion racing simulators and psychotherapy.

Some programs have been criticized for offering long-term, low-paying contracts, whilst occasionally charging additional fees for the use of their facilities and technologies. Companies that specialise in driver training and related programs remain commercially viable through such fees, and typically do not financially support junior careers. Investment in a driver may also be recouped via a share of earnings from wages and brand deals.

== Open-wheel racing ==
=== Formula One ===
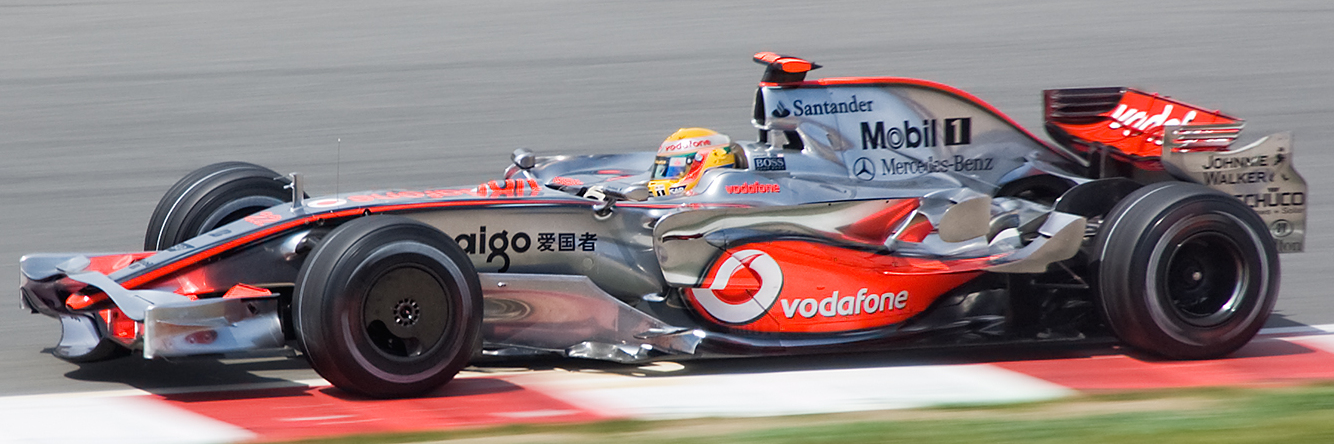
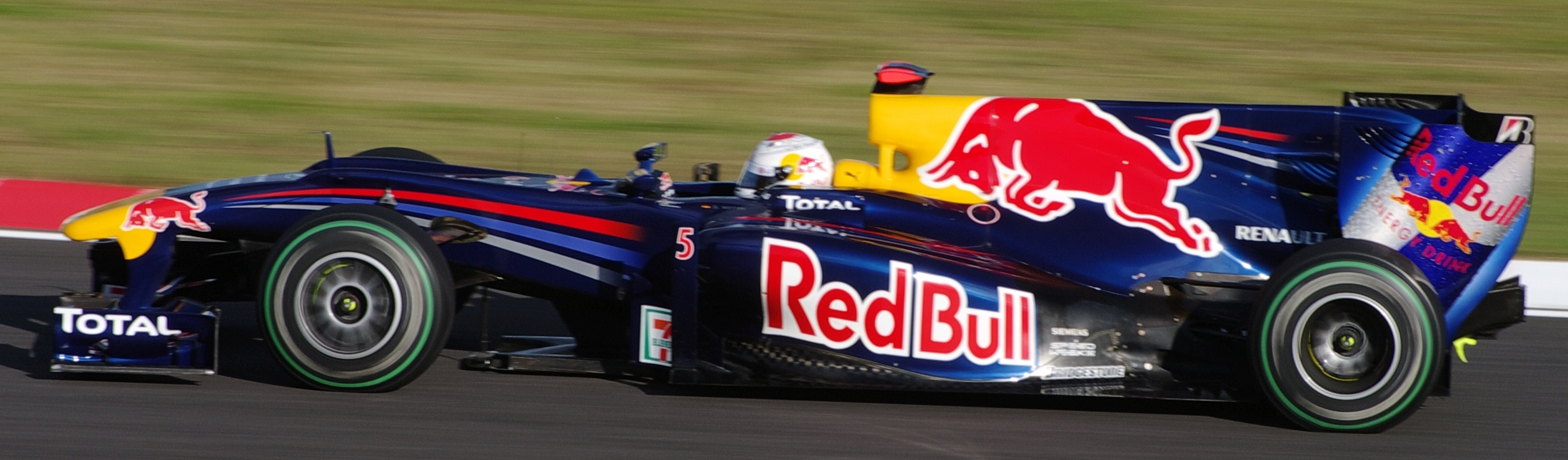
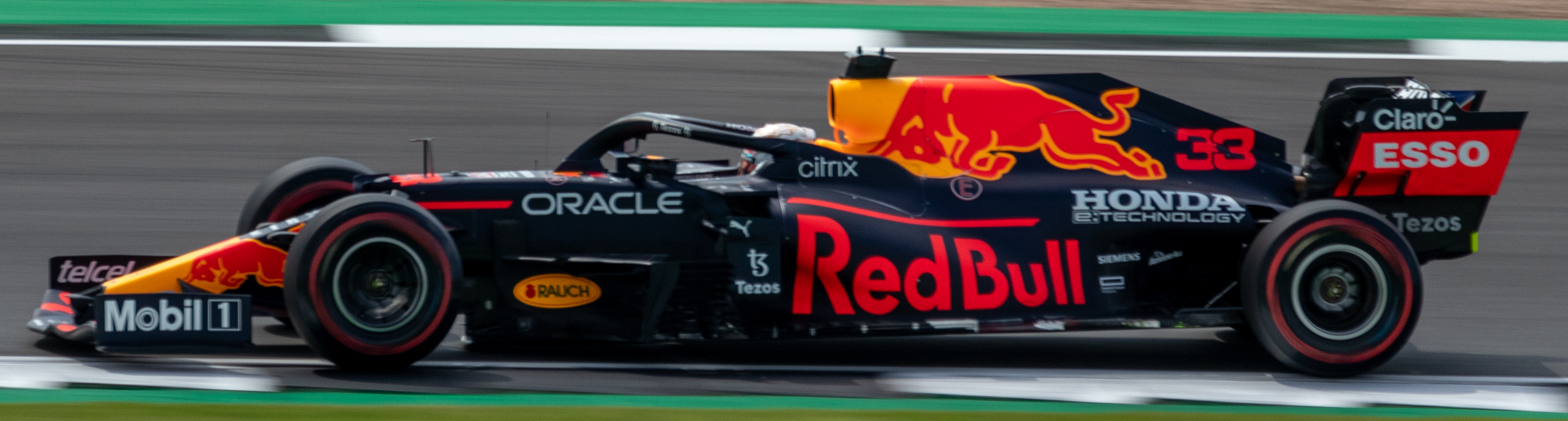
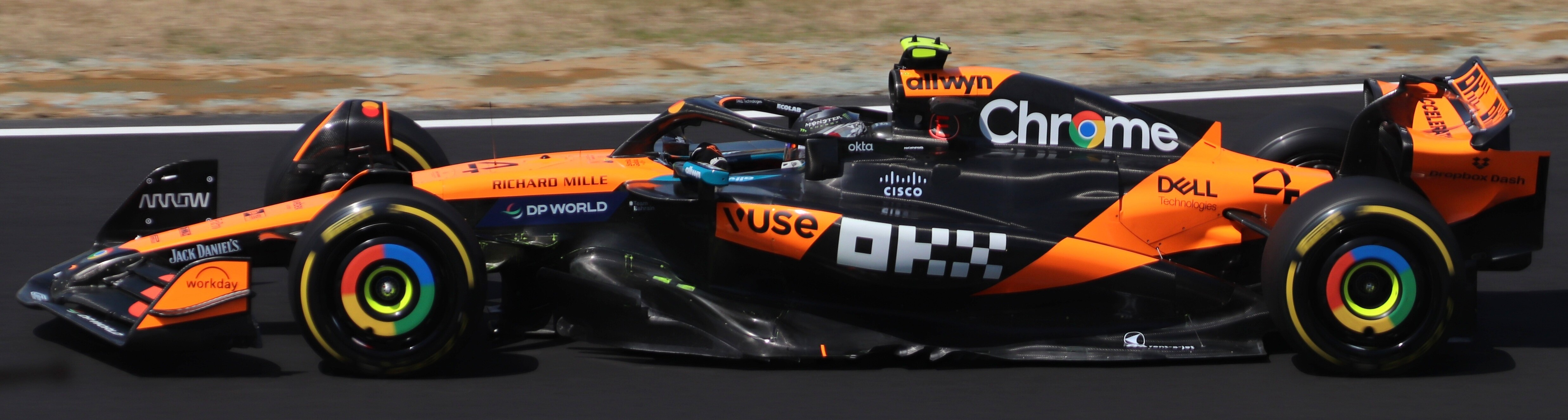
Four graduates of driver development programs have won the World Drivers' Championship: Lewis Hamilton of McLaren (2008), Sebastian Vettel of Red Bull (2010), Max Verstappen of Red Bull (2021), and Lando Norris of McLaren (2025).

In 1998, McLaren became the first Formula One team to establish a driver development program, founding the McLaren-Mercedes Young Driver Support Programme; its initial cohort famously included 13-year-old kart racer Lewis Hamilton, who became the first driver development program alumnus in Formula One to win the World Drivers' Championship in 2008. The Red Bull Junior Team have graduated 16 members—and two former members—to Formula One, noted for their use of a second team to promote junior talent under the wing of Helmut Marko. As of 2024, Red Bull have coached two World Drivers' Champions, both winning their titles with Red Bull Racing: Sebastian Vettel and Max Verstappen.

| Driver program | Team | Est | Selected Driver(s) (Note: Drivers who have graduated to Formula One as members of the program, as of 2026. Bold indicates a World Drivers' Champion.) |
|---|---|---|---|
| Alpine Academy | (France) Alpine | 2002 | (Finland) Heikki Kovalainen (2007); (France) Romain Grosjean (2009); (Australia) Jack Doohan (2024) |
| AMF1 Driver Development Programme | (United Kingdom) Aston Martin | 2021 | None |
| Audi Driver Development Programme | (Germany) Audi | 2026 | None |
| Ferrari Driver Academy | (Italy) Ferrari | 2009 | (Mexico) Sergio Pérez (2011); (France) Jules Bianchi (2013); (Monaco) Charles Leclerc (2018); (Germany) Mick Schumacher (2021); (United Kingdom) Oliver Bearman (2024) |
| Haas Driver Development Program | (United States) Haas | 2016 | (Brazil) Pietro Fittipaldi (2020) |
| Honda Formula Dream Project | (Japan) Honda; (United Kingdom) Aston Martin (Note: As an engine supplier.) | 2006 | (Japan) Yuki Tsunoda (2021) (Note: Also a member of the Red Bull Junior Team.) |
| McLaren Driver Development Programme | (United Kingdom) McLaren | 1998 | (United Kingdom) Lewis Hamilton (2007); (Denmark) Kevin Magnussen (2014); (Belgium) Stoffel Vandoorne (2016); (United Kingdom) Lando Norris (2019) |
| Mercedes Junior Team | (Germany) Mercedes | 2014 | (Germany) Pascal Wehrlein (2016); (France) Esteban Ocon (2016); (United Kingdom) George Russell (2019); (Italy) Kimi Antonelli (2025) |
| Red Bull Junior Team | (Austria) Red Bull (Italy) Racing Bulls | 2001 | (Austria) Christian Klien (2004); (Italy) Vitantonio Liuzzi (2005); (United States) Scott Speed (2006); (Germany) Sebastian Vettel (2007); (Switzerland) Sébastien Buemi (2009); (Spain) Jaime Alguersuari (2009); (Australia) Daniel Ricciardo (2011); (France) Jean-Éric Vergne (2012); (Russia) Daniil Kvyat (2014); (Netherlands) Max Verstappen (2015); (Spain) Carlos Sainz Jr. (2015); (France) Pierre Gasly (2017); (Japan) Yuki Tsunoda (2021) (Note: Also a member of the Honda Formula Dream Project.); (New Zealand) Liam Lawson (2023); (France) Isack Hadjar (2025); (United Kingdom) Arvid Lindblad (2026) |
| Williams Driver Academy | (United Kingdom) Williams | 2016 | (Canada) Lance Stroll (2017); (Canada) Nicholas Latifi (2020); (United Kingdom) Jack Aitken (2020); (United States) Logan Sargeant (2023); (Argentina) Franco Colapinto (2024) |
Former teams
| Caterham Development Driver Program | (Malaysia) Caterham | 2012–2014 | (Netherlands) Giedo van der Garde (2013); (United Kingdom) Will Stevens (2014) |
| Force India F1 Team Academy | Force India | 2011–2018 | None |
| Marussia F1 Team Young Driver Program | (Russia) (United Kingdom) Marussia | 2012–2015 | (United Kingdom) Max Chilton (2013) |
| Sauber Academy | (Switzerland) Sauber | 2019–2025 | None |
| Team Lotus Young Drivers Scheme | (Malaysia) Team Lotus | 2010–2011 | None |
| Toyota Young Drivers Programme | (Japan) Toyota (United Kingdom) Williams | 2001–2009 | (Japan) Kazuki Nakajima (2007); (Japan) Kamui Kobayashi (2009) |

=== IndyCar Series ===
- Andretti Global – Lochie Hughes, Salvador de Alba, Dennis Hauger, James Roe Jr., Ricardo Escotto, Sebastian Murray (all Indy NXT), Oliver Wheldon (Skip Barber Formula Race Series), Sebastian Wheldon (Italian F4 Championship)
- Chip Ganassi Racing – Jonathan Browne, Niels Koolen (both Indy NXT), Jett Bowling, Nicolas Stati (both Formula Regional Oceania Championship)
- Ed Carpenter Racing – Josh Pierson (Indy NXT)
- Juncos Hollinger Racing – Miguel María García (Indy NXT)
- Team Penske – Myles Rowe (Indy NXT)

=== Super Formula ===
- Honda Formula Dream Project
- TGR Driver Challenge Program

== Stock car racing ==
=== NASCAR ===
All of these teams have their own developmental driver programs and/or field cars/trucks on their team for developmental drivers.

- 23XI Racing
  - Corey Heim
- Chevrolet
  - Lanie Buice
  - Andrés Pérez de Lara
- Joe Gibbs Racing
  - Max Reaves
- Hendrick Motorsports
  - Corey Day
- Richard Childress Racing
  - Carson Brown
- Spire Motorsports
  - Tristan McKee
- Toyota Racing
  - Jade Avedisian
  - Harrison Burton
  - Brent Crews
  - Taylor Gray
  - Keelan Harvick
  - Kaden Honeycutt
  - Isabella Robusto
  - Gio Ruggiero
  - William Sawalich

== See also ==
- Drive for Diversity
- Drivers Edge Development
- Porsche Junioren
- VMB Driver Development
