= 2026 Formula Winter Series =

Motor racing competition

The 2026 Formula Winter Series was the fourth season of the Formula Winter Series. It was a multi-event motor racing championship for open-wheel, formula racing cars regulated according to Formula 4 regulations by the Fédération Internationale de l'Automobile (FIA), and was organised by Gedlich Racing.

The championship consisted of five rounds in Portugal and Spain, beginning on 24 January at Circuito do Estoril and ending on 15 March at Circuit de Barcelona-Catalunya. The rookies' championship featured a separate classification for the first time, rather than the title being awarded to the highest-placed rookie in the drivers' championship.

== Entries ==
Entry list
| Team | No. | Driver | Class | Rounds |
|---|---|---|---|---|
| (Netherlands) Van Amersfoort Racing | 2 | (Netherlands) Rocco Coronel | R | 1–3 |
| (Netherlands) Van Amersfoort Racing | 3 | (Poland) Aleksander Ruta | | 1–4 |
| (Netherlands) Van Amersfoort Racing | 53 | (Brazil) Pedro Lima | | All |
| (Netherlands) Van Amersfoort Racing | 87 | (United Kingdom) Thomas Bearman | | All |
| (Netherlands) Van Amersfoort Racing | 97 | (Kyrgyzstan) Platon Kostin | | 4–5 |
| (New Zealand) Rodin Motorsport | 5 | (United Kingdom) Ella Stevens | R F | 2 |
| (New Zealand) Rodin Motorsport | 15 | (Belgium) Dries Van Langendonck | R | All |
| (New Zealand) Rodin Motorsport | 32 | (South Africa) Ethan Lennon | R | All |
| (New Zealand) Rodin Motorsport | 77 | (United Kingdom) Alfie Slater | R | All |
| (Austria) Renauer Motorsport | 6 | (Lithuania) Tomas Rudokas | R | 1–2 |
| (Germany) US Racing | 7 | (United Kingdom) Roman Kamyab | R | 1–4 |
| (Germany) US Racing | 13 | (Australia) Noah Killion | | All |
| (Germany) US Racing | 17 | (Italy) Oleksandr Savinkov (Note: Oleksandr Savinkov is Russo-Ukrainian but competed under an Italian licence.) | | All |
| (Germany) US Racing | 29 | (Italy) Ludovico Busso | | All |
| (Germany) US Racing | 46 | (India) Ary Bansal | | All |
| (Germany) US Racing | 62 | (Germany) Arjen Kräling | | All |
| (Slovenia) AS Motorsport Olimpija | 10 | (Italy) Ginevra Panzeri | F | All |
| (Slovenia) AS Motorsport Olimpija | 37 | (Denmark) Viktor Poulsen | | 1–2, 4–5 |
| (Slovenia) AS Motorsport Olimpija | 52 | (Canada) Alexander Chartier | R | 4–5 |
| (Slovenia) AS Motorsport Olimpija | 54 | (Denmark) Erik Poulsen | R | 3 |
| (Denmark) STEP Motorsport | 54 | (Denmark) Erik Poulsen | R | 5 |
| (Italy) Cram Motorsport | 11 | (Italy) Oscar Repetto (Note: Repetto is New Zealand-Monégasque but competed under an Italian licence.) | R | 1, 3, 5 |
| (Italy) Cram Motorsport | 12 | (Brazil) Alexandre Louza | | 2, 4 |
| (Italy) Cram Motorsport | 28 | (Switzerland) Samuel Ifrid | R | All |
| (Italy) Cram Motorsport | 40 | (United States) Andre Rodriguez | | All |
| (Italy) Cram Motorsport | 66 | (Switzerland) Maximilian Kammerlander | R | All |
| (Germany) Mathilda Racing | 18 | (Germany) Mathilda Paatz | F | 1–2, 4 |
| (Germany) Mathilda Racing | 35 | (United States) Caitlyn McDaniel | R F | 3 |
| (Germany) Mathilda Racing | 36 | (United States) Rahim Alibhai | R | 4 |
| (Germany) Mathilda Racing | 58 | (Canada) Jensen Burnett | R | 3 |
| (Germany) Mathilda Racing | 19 | (Belgium) Emmilio Valentino Del Grosso | R | 2 |
| (San Marino) AKM Motorsport | 19 | (Belgium) Emmilio Valentino Del Grosso | R | 4 |
| (San Marino) AKM Motorsport | 44 | (Netherlands) Felipe Reijs | R | 1–3 |
| (San Marino) AKM Motorsport | 55 | (Australia) George Proudford-Nalder | R | 4–5 |
| (San Marino) AKM Motorsport | 88 | (Italy) Vittorio Orsini | R | All |
| (San Marino) AKM Motorsport | 99 | (Saudi Arabia) Abdullah Kamel | | 1–3 |
| (Switzerland) Jenzer Motorsport | 20 | (Czech Republic) Teodor Borenstein | | All |
| (Switzerland) Jenzer Motorsport | 21 | (Switzerland) Levi Arn | R | All |
| (Switzerland) Jenzer Motorsport | 24 | (Mexico) Nicolás Cortés | | 2, 4 |
| (Switzerland) Jenzer Motorsport | 25 | (Switzerland) Georgiy Zasov | R | 1, 3, 5 |
| (Switzerland) Jenzer Motorsport | 26 | (Lithuania) Markas Šilkūnas | R | All |
| (Spain) Campos Racing | 70 | (Brazil) Rafaela Ferreira | F | 1 |
| (Spain) Campos Racing | 71 | (United Kingdom) Alisha Palmowski | F | 1, 4 |
| (Spain) Campos Racing | 75 | (United Kingdom) Megan Bruce | F | 4 |
| (Spain) Campos Racing | 89 | (Switzerland) Chiara Bättig | F | All |
| (Spain) Campos Racing | 92 | (Sweden) Leon Hedfors | R | 2–3, 5 |
| (Spain) Campos Racing | 93 | (Romania) Zoe Florescu | R F | 2–3 (Note: Zoe Florescu only entered round two in the rookie class.) |
| (Spain) Campos Racing | 94 | (United Kingdom) Timo Jüngling | R | 5 |

Entry list key
| Icon | Legend |
|---|---|
| R | Rookie |
| F | Female |

== Calendar ==
The calendar expanded from four rounds in previous seasons to five rounds in 2026. The season opener was half at Circuito do Estoril, the series' first visit to the track. All rounds supported the GT Winter Series.

Calendar
| Round | Circuit | Dates | Supporting | Map of circuit locations |
|---|---|---|---|---|
| 1 | Circuito do Estoril (Estoril, Portugal) | 22–25 January | GT Winter Series; GT4 Winter Series | Map of the Iberian Peninsula with circuit locations for the 2026 Formula Winter Series |
| 2 | Algarve International Circuit (Portimão, Portugal) | 5–8 February | GT Winter Series; Sports Prototypes Winter Series | Map of the Iberian Peninsula with circuit locations for the 2026 Formula Winter Series |
| 3 | Circuit Ricardo Tormo (Cheste, Spain) | 12–15 February | GT Winter Series; GT4 Winter Series; Sports Prototypes Winter Series | Map of the Iberian Peninsula with circuit locations for the 2026 Formula Winter Series |
| 4 | MotorLand Aragón (Alcañiz, Spain) | 5–8 March | GT Winter Series; GT4 Winter Series; Prototype Winter Series | Map of the Iberian Peninsula with circuit locations for the 2026 Formula Winter Series |
| 5 | Circuit de Barcelona-Catalunya (Montmeló, Spain) | 12–15 March | GT Winter Series; GT4 Winter Series; Prototype Winter Series | Map of the Iberian Peninsula with circuit locations for the 2026 Formula Winter Series |

== Results and standings ==
=== Results ===
Results
| Round | | Circuit | Pole position | Fastest lap | Winning driver | Winning team | Rookie winner | Female winner |
|---|---|---|---|---|---|---|---|---|
| 1 | R1 | (Portugal) Estoril | (Belgium) Dries Van Langendonck | (Germany) Arjen Kräling | (Belgium) Dries Van Langendonck | (New Zealand) Rodin Motorsport | (Belgium) Dries Van Langendonck | (United Kingdom) Alisha Palmowski |
| 1 | R2 | (Portugal) Estoril | (United Kingdom) Alisha Palmowski | (Netherlands) Rocco Coronel | (Netherlands) Rocco Coronel | (Netherlands) Van Amersfoort Racing | (Netherlands) Rocco Coronel | (United Kingdom) Alisha Palmowski |
| 1 | R3 | (Portugal) Estoril | (Belgium) Dries Van Langendonck | (Belgium) Dries Van Langendonck | (Italy) Oleksandr Savinkov | (Germany) US Racing | (Italy) Vittorio Orsini | (Switzerland) Chiara Bättig |
| 2 | R1 | (Portugal) Portimão | (South Africa) Ethan Lennon | (India) Ary Bansal | (India) Ary Bansal | (Germany) US Racing | (Netherlands) Rocco Coronel | (Germany) Mathilda Paatz |
| 2 | R2 | (Portugal) Portimão | (South Africa) Ethan Lennon | (Belgium) Dries Van Langendonck | (Belgium) Dries Van Langendonck | (New Zealand) Rodin Motorsport | (Belgium) Dries Van Langendonck | (Romania) Zoe Florescu |
| 2 | R3 | (Portugal) Portimão | (Belgium) Dries Van Langendonck | (Belgium) Dries Van Langendonck | (Belgium) Dries Van Langendonck | (New Zealand) Rodin Motorsport | (Belgium) Dries Van Langendonck | (Romania) Zoe Florescu |
| 3 | R1 | (Spain) Valencia | (Belgium) Dries Van Langendonck | (Belgium) Dries Van Langendonck | (Belgium) Dries Van Langendonck | (New Zealand) Rodin Motorsport | (Belgium) Dries Van Langendonck | (Switzerland) Chiara Bättig |
| 3 | R2 | (Spain) Valencia | (Belgium) Dries Van Langendonck | (Germany) Arjen Kräling | (Poland) Aleksander Ruta | (Netherlands) Van Amersfoort Racing | (Belgium) Dries Van Langendonck | (Romania) Zoe Florescu |
| 3 | R3 | (Spain) Valencia | (Germany) Arjen Kräling (Note: Due to a weather alert for strong winds, the race schedule for Valencia was condensed into one day and only one qualifying session was held; the grid for race three was set by each driver's fastest lap in race two.) | (Germany) Arjen Kräling | (Germany) Arjen Kräling | (Germany) US Racing | (Switzerland) Samuel Ifrid | (Romania) Zoe Florescu |
| 4 | R1 | (Spain) Aragón | (United Kingdom) Thomas Bearman | (India) Ary Bansal | (India) Ary Bansal | (Germany) US Racing | (Belgium) Dries Van Langendonck | (Switzerland) Chiara Bättig |
| 4 | R2 | (Spain) Aragón | (United Kingdom) Thomas Bearman | (Belgium) Dries Van Langendonck | (Belgium) Dries Van Langendonck | (New Zealand) Rodin Motorsport | (Belgium) Dries Van Langendonck | (Germany) Mathilda Paatz |
| 4 | R3 | (Spain) Aragón | (Belgium) Dries Van Langendonck | (United Kingdom) Thomas Bearman | (Belgium) Dries Van Langendonck | (New Zealand) Rodin Motorsport | (Belgium) Dries Van Langendonck | (Switzerland) Chiara Bättig |
| 5 | R1 | (Spain) Barcelona | (Belgium) Dries Van Langendonck | (Belgium) Dries Van Langendonck | (Belgium) Dries Van Langendonck | (New Zealand) Rodin Motorsport | (Belgium) Dries Van Langendonck | (Italy) Ginevra Panzeri |
| 5 | R2 | (Spain) Barcelona | (Belgium) Dries Van Langendonck | (Belgium) Dries Van Langendonck | (Belgium) Dries Van Langendonck | (New Zealand) Rodin Motorsport | (Belgium) Dries Van Langendonck | (Switzerland) Chiara Bättig |
| 5 | R3 | (Spain) Barcelona | (Belgium) Dries Van Langendonck | (Belgium) Dries Van Langendonck | (Belgium) Dries Van Langendonck | (New Zealand) Rodin Motorsport | (Belgium) Dries Van Langendonck | (Switzerland) Chiara Bättig |

=== Scoring system ===
Points are awarded to the top-10 classified drivers; the highest-placed driver in each qualifying session, which set the grids for races one and three, respectively; and the fastest lap holder, as follows:

| Position | 1st | 2nd | 3rd | 4th | 5th | 6th | 7th | 8th | 9th | 10th | Pole | FL |
|---|---|---|---|---|---|---|---|---|---|---|---|---|
| Points | 25 | 18 | 15 | 12 | 10 | 8 | 6 | 4 | 2 | 1 | 2 | 1 |

Drivers are deducted 10 points for any technical disqualifications. The grids for race two are set by each driver's second-fastest lap time in qualifying one.

=== Drivers' championship standings ===
Drivers' championship standings
| Pos | Driver | EST (Portugal) | | | POR (Portugal) | | | CRT (Spain) | | | ARA (Spain) | | | CAT (Spain) | | | Points |
| Pos | Driver | R1 | R2 | R3 | R1 | R2 | R3 | R1 | R2 | R3 | R1 | R2 | R3 | R1 | R2 | R3 | Points |
|---|---|---|---|---|---|---|---|---|---|---|---|---|---|---|---|---|---|
| 1 | (Belgium) Dries Van Langendonck | **1** | 2 | **22** | 7 | 1 | **1** | **1** | **3** | 8 | 2 | 1 | **1** | **1** | **1** | **1** | 308 |
| 2 | (United Kingdom) Thomas Bearman | 11 | 3 | 20 | 2 | 7 | 7 | 15 | 2 | 3 | **3** | **3** | 2 | 23 | 2 | 4 | 159 |
| 3 | (India) Ary Bansal | 28 | 5 | 4 | 1 | 5 | 6 | 5 | 5 | 6 | 1 | 11 | Ret | 5 | Ret | 2 | 148 |
| 4 | (Italy) Oleksandr Savinkov | 26 | 7 | 1 | 5 | 14 | 2 | 17 | 28† | 4 | 9 | 2 | 5 | 6 | 5 | 8 | 123 |
| 5 | (South Africa) Ethan Lennon | 30 | 4 | 24 | **8** | **3** | 4 | 9 | 22 | 18 | 5 | 23 | 3 | 2 | Ret | 3 | 105 |
| 6 | (Poland) Aleksander Ruta | 27 | 6 | 25 | 6 | 6 | 5 | 3 | 1 | 2 | 10 | DNS | DNS | | | | 93 |
| 7 | (United Kingdom) Alfie Slater | 2 | 16 | 27 | Ret | 2 | 8 | 6 | 25 | 11 | 8 | 26 | 8 | 3 | Ret | 7 | 77 |
| 8 | (Germany) Arjen Kräling | 6 | 27 | 13 | 18 | 15 | 12 | 19 | 29† | **1** | 23 | 7 | 4 | 7 | 8 | 5 | 74 |
| 9 | (Netherlands) Rocco Coronel | 12 | 1 | 17 | 4 | 4 | 9 | 2 | Ret | 15 | | | | | | | 70 |
| 10 | (Brazil) Pedro Lima | 24 | 8 | 23 | Ret | 8 | 11 | 4 | 8 | 14 | 4 | 4 | 25 | 9 | 4 | Ret | 62 |
| 11 | (Italy) Ludovico Busso | 10 | 12 | 10 | 9 | 9 | 3 | 7 | 4 | 5 | 27 | 29† | 7 | Ret | 7 | 17 | 61 |
| 12 | (Switzerland) Levi Arn | 3 | 29† | 7 | 23 | 17 | 15 | 20 | 13 | 29 | 11 | 6 | 6 | 12 | 6 | 9 | 47 |
| 13 | (Australia) George Proudford-Nalder | | | | | | | | | | 7 | 15 | 9 | 4 | 3 | 6 | 43 |
| 14 | (Switzerland) Samuel Ifrid | 17 | 10 | 6 | 13 | 12 | 10 | 11 | 11 | 7 | 18 | 5 | 15 | 10 | 9 | 10 | 30 |
| 15 | (Czech Republic) Teodor Borenstein | 22 | 14 | 18 | 3 | 10 | 14 | 12 | 7 | 12 | 24 | 8 | Ret | Ret | Ret | 11 | 26 |
| 16 | (Australia) Noah Killion | 5 | 19 | Ret | 10 | 11 | 13 | 8 | 24 | 10 | 6 | 16 | 17 | Ret | 23† | 15 | 24 |
| 17 | (Switzerland) Chiara Bättig | 16 | 17 | 2 | 21 | 26 | 21 | 16 | 21 | 25 | 16 | 12 | 10 | 21 | 11 | 14 | 19 |
| 18 | (Germany) Mathilda Paatz | 23 | 23 | 3 | 20 | 27 | 24 | | | | 20 | 9 | 21 | | | | 17 |
| 19 | (United Kingdom) Alisha Palmowski | 4 | **11** | 15 | | | | | | | 19 | Ret | 13 | | | | 12 |
| 20 | (Italy) Vittorio Orsini | 18 | 26 | 5 | 25 | 32 | Ret | 23 | Ret | 28 | 26 | 20 | 26 | 24 | 21 | 18 | 10 |
| 21 | (Canada) Jensen Burnett | | | | | | | 21 | 6 | 16 | | | | | | | 8 |
| 22 | (Netherlands) Felipe Reijs | 7 | 13 | 16 | 28 | 20 | 19 | 10 | 15 | 17 | | | | | | | 7 |
| 23 | (Italy) Oscar Repetto | 13 | 9 | 21 | | | | 18 | 10 | 9 | | | | 14 | 24† | 25 | 5 |
| 24 | (Kyrgyzstan) Platon Kostin | | | | | | | | | | 15 | 14 | 19 | 8 | 15 | 12 | 4 |
| 25 | (Lithuania) Tomas Rudokas | 8 | 25 | 14 | 16 | 21 | Ret | | | | | | | | | | 4 |
| 26 | (United States) Andre Rodriguez | 20 | 18 | 8 | 14 | 16 | Ret | Ret | 16 | Ret | 22 | 24 | 24 | 18 | 13 | Ret | 4 |
| 27 | (United Kingdom) Roman Kamyab | 25 | 21 | 11 | 11 | 13 | 17 | 13 | 9 | 13 | WD | WD | WD | | | | 2 |
| 28 | (Saudi Arabia) Abdullah Kamel | 31† | 28 | 9 | 29 | 24 | 22 | 22 | 12 | 19 | | | | | | | 2 |
| 29 | (Italy) Ginevra Panzeri | 9 | 24 | Ret | 24 | 29 | 26 | 24 | 19 | 24 | 29 | 21 | Ret | 19 | 18 | 22 | 2 |
| 30 | (Sweden) Leon Hedfors | | | | 19 | 30 | 27 | 14 | 14 | 22 | | | | 11 | 10 | 16 | 1 |
| 31 | (Canada) Alexander Chartier | | | | | | | | | | 17 | 10 | 14 | 13 | 16 | 20 | 1 |
| 32 | (United States) Rahim Alibhai | | | | | | | | | | 13 | 19 | 11 | | | | 0 |
| 33 | (Lithuania) Markas Šilkūnas | 15 | 15 | Ret | 12 | 19 | DNS | 28 | 23 | 20 | 12 | 27 | 12 | 17 | 12 | 13 | 0 |
| 34 | (Switzerland) Maximilian Kammerlander | 14 | 22 | 12 | 15 | 18 | 23 | Ret | 18 | 23 | 25 | 25 | 23 | 15 | 20 | 21 | 0 |
| 35 | (Belgium) Emmilio Valentino Del Grosso | | | | Ret | 31 | 18 | | | | 14 | 13 | 22 | | | | 0 |
| 36 | (Switzerland) Georgiy Zasov | 19 | 30† | 26 | | | | 25 | 26 | Ret | | | | 16 | 14 | 19 | 0 |
| 37 | (Mexico) Nicolás Cortés | | | | 17 | Ret | 16 | | | | 28 | 28 | 16 | | | | 0 |
| 38 | (Denmark) Viktor Poulsen | 29 | Ret | Ret | 22 | 23 | 29 | | | | 30 | 17 | 18 | 20 | 17 | 23 | 0 |
| 39 | (Romania) Zoe Florescu | | | | Ret | 22 | 20 | Ret | 17 | 21 | | | | | | | 0 |
| 40 | (United Kingdom) Megan Bruce | | | | | | | | | | 21 | 18 | 20 | | | | 0 |
| 41 | (Brazil) Rafaela Ferreira | 21 | 20 | 19 | | | | | | | | | | | | | 0 |
| 42 | (Denmark) Erik Poulsen | | | | | | | 26 | 20 | 26 | | | | 25 | 19 | 24 | 0 |
| 43 | (Brazil) Alexandre Louza | | | | 27 | 25 | 28 | | | | Ret | 22 | 27 | | | | 0 |
| 44 | (United Kingdom) Ella Stevens | | | | 26 | 28 | 25 | | | | | | | | | | 0 |
| 45 | (United States) Caitlyn McDaniel | | | | | | | 27 | 27 | 27 | | | | | | | 0 |
Guest drivers ineligible to score points
| | (United Kingdom) Timo Jüngling | | | | | | | | | | | | | 22 | 22† | 26 | |
| Pos | Driver | R1 | R2 | R3 | R1 | R2 | R3 | R1 | R2 | R3 | R1 | R2 | R3 | R1 | R2 | R3 | Points |
| Pos | Driver | EST (Portugal) | | | POR (Portugal) | | | CRT (Spain) | | | ARA (Spain) | | | CAT (Spain) | | | Points |

| Colour | Result |
|---|---|
| Gold | Winner |
| Silver | Second place |
| Bronze | Third place |
| Green | Points classification |
| Blue | Non-points classification |
| Blue | Non-classified finish (NC) |
| Purple | Retired, not classified (Ret) |
| Red | Did not qualify (DNQ) |
| Red | Did not pre-qualify (DNPQ) |
| Black | Disqualified (DSQ) |
| White | Did not start (DNS) |
| White | Withdrew (WD) |
| White | Race cancelled (C) |
| Blank | Did not practice (DNP) |
| Blank | Did not arrive (DNA) |
| Blank | Excluded (EX) |

**Bold** – Pole

Italics – Fastest Lap

† – Did not finish, but was classified as they had completed more than 75% of the race distance.

=== Rookies' championship standings ===
Points are awarded as they are in the overall championship, with all non-rookie drivers removed from the classification; pole positions and fastest laps are not counted.

Rookies' championship standings
| Pos | Driver | EST (Portugal) | | | POR (Portugal) | | | CRT (Spain) | | | ARA (Spain) | | | CAT (Spain) | | | Points |
| Pos | Driver | R1 | R2 | R3 | R1 | R2 | R3 | R1 | R2 | R3 | R1 | R2 | R3 | R1 | R2 | R3 | Points |
|---|---|---|---|---|---|---|---|---|---|---|---|---|---|---|---|---|---|
| 1 | (Belgium) Dries Van Langendonck | 1 | 2 | 10 | 2 | 1 | 1 | 1 | 1 | 2 | 1 | 1 | 1 | 1 | 1 | 1 | 330 |
| 2 | (Switzerland) Samuel Ifrid | 10 | 5 | 2 | 6 | 5 | 5 | 6 | 5 | 1 | 10 | 2 | 9 | 5 | 4 | 6 | 151 |
| 3 | (South Africa) Ethan Lennon | 14 | 3 | 11 | 3 | 3 | 2 | 4 | 11 | 9 | 2 | 9 | 2 | 2 | Ret | 2 | 151 |
| 4 | (United Kingdom) Alfie Slater | 2 | 8 | 13 | Ret | 2 | 3 | 3 | 13 | 4 | 4 | 12 | 4 | 3 | Ret | 4 | 133 |
| 5 | (Switzerland) Levi Arn | 3 | 13† | 3 | 10 | 7 | 6 | 10 | 6 | 17 | 5 | 3 | 3 | 7 | 3 | 5 | 125 |
| 6 | (Netherlands) Rocco Coronel | 6 | 1 | 8 | 1 | 4 | 4 | 2 | Ret | 6 | | | | | | | 112 |
| 7 | (Australia) George Proudford-Nalder | | | | | | | | | | 3 | 6 | 5 | 4 | 2 | 3 | 78 |
| 8 | (United Kingdom) Roman Kamyab | 13 | 9 | 4 | 4 | 6 | 7 | 7 | 3 | 5 | WD | WD | WD | | | | 71 |
| 9 | (Italy) Oscar Repetto | 7 | 4 | 9 | | | | 9 | 4 | 3 | | | | 9 | 13 | 14 | 51 |
| 10 | (Lithuania) Markas Šilkūnas | 9 | 7 | Ret | 5 | 9 | Ret | 16 | 12 | 10 | 6 | 11 | 7 | 12 | 6 | 7 | 49 |
| 11 | (Netherlands) Felipe Reijs | 4 | 6 | 7 | 13 | 10 | 9 | 5 | 8 | 8 | | | | | | | 47 |
| 12 | (Sweden) Leon Hedfors | | | | 9 | 14 | 13 | 8 | 7 | 12 | | | | 6 | 5 | 8 | 34 |
| 13 | (Italy) Vittorio Orsini | 11 | 12 | 1 | 11 | 16 | Ret | 12 | Ret | 16 | 12 | 8 | 12 | 14 | 11 | 9 | 31 |
| 14 | (Switzerland) Maximilian Kammerlander | 8 | 10 | 5 | 7 | 8 | 11 | Ret | 9 | 13 | 11 | 10 | 11 | 10 | 10 | 12 | 30 |
| 15 | (Canada) Alexander Chartier | | | | | | | | | | 9 | 4 | 8 | 8 | 8 | 11 | 26 |
| 16 | (Canada) Jensen Burnett | | | | | | | 11 | 2 | 7 | | | | | | | 24 |
| 17 | (Lithuania) Tomas Rudokas | 5 | 11 | 6 | 8 | 11 | Ret | | | | | | | | | | 22 |
| 18 | (United States) Rahim Alibhai | | | | | | | | | | 7 | 7 | 6 | | | | 20 |
| 19 | (Belgium) Emmilio Valentino Del Grosso | | | | Ret | 15 | 8 | | | | 8 | 5 | 10 | | | | 19 |
| 20 | (Switzerland) Georgiy Zasov | 12 | 14† | 12 | | | | 13 | 14 | Ret | | | | 11 | 7 | 10 | 7 |
| 21 | (Denmark) Eric Poulsen | | | | | | | 14 | 10 | 14 | | | | 15 | 9 | 13 | 3 |
| 22 | (Romania) Zoe Florescu | | | | Ret | 12 | 10 | | | | | | | | | | 1 |
| 23 | (United Kingdom) Ella Stevens | | | | 12 | 13 | 12 | | | | | | | | | | 0 |
| 24 | (United States) Caitlyn McDaniel | | | | | | | 15 | 15 | 15 | | | | | | | 0 |
| 25 | (United Kingdom) Timo Jüngling | | | | | | | | | | | | | 13 | 12 | 15 | 0 |
| Pos | Driver | R1 | R2 | R3 | R1 | R2 | R3 | R1 | R2 | R3 | R1 | R2 | R3 | R1 | R2 | R3 | Points |
| Pos | Driver | EST (Portugal) | | | POR (Portugal) | | | CRT (Spain) | | | ARA (Spain) | | | CAT (Spain) | | | Points |

=== Teams' championship standings ===
Each team's two highest-classified drivers in each race score points for the teams' championship; pole positions and fastest laps are not counted.

Teams' championship standings
| Pos | Team | EST (Portugal) | | | POR (Portugal) | | | CRT (Spain) | | | ARA (Spain) | | | CAT (Spain) | | | Points |
| Pos | Team | R1 | R2 | R3 | R1 | R2 | R3 | R1 | R2 | R3 | R1 | R2 | R3 | R1 | R2 | R3 | Points |
|---|---|---|---|---|---|---|---|---|---|---|---|---|---|---|---|---|---|
| 1 | (New Zealand) Rodin Motorsport | 1 | 2 | 22 | 7 | 1 | 1 | 1 | 3 | 8 | 2 | 1 | 1 | 1 | 1 | 1 | 416 |
| 1 | (New Zealand) Rodin Motorsport | 2 | 4 | 24 | 8 | 2 | 4 | 6 | 22 | 11 | 5 | 23 | 3 | 2 | Ret | 3 | 416 |
| 2 | (Germany) US Racing | 5 | 5 | 1 | 1 | 5 | 2 | 5 | 4 | 1 | 1 | 2 | 4 | 5 | 5 | 2 | 367 |
| 2 | (Germany) US Racing | 6 | 7 | 4 | 5 | 9 | 3 | 7 | 5 | 4 | 6 | 7 | 5 | 6 | 7 | 5 | 367 |
| 3 | (Netherlands) Van Amersfoort Racing | 11 | 1 | 17 | 2 | 4 | 5 | 2 | 1 | 2 | 3 | 3 | 2 | 8 | 2 | 4 | 335 |
| 3 | (Netherlands) Van Amersfoort Racing | 12 | 3 | 20 | 4 | 6 | 7 | 3 | 2 | 3 | 4 | 4 | 19 | 9 | 4 | 12 | 335 |
| 4 | (Switzerland) Jenzer Motorsport | 3 | 14 | 7 | 3 | 10 | 14 | 12 | 7 | 12 | 11 | 6 | 6 | 12 | 6 | 9 | 73 |
| 4 | (Switzerland) Jenzer Motorsport | 15 | 15 | 18 | 12 | 17 | 15 | 20 | 13 | 20 | 12 | 8 | 12 | 16 | 12 | 11 | 73 |
| 5 | (San Marino) AKM Motorsport | 7 | 13 | 5 | 25 | 20 | 19 | 10 | 12 | 17 | 7 | 13 | 9 | 4 | 3 | 6 | 62 |
| 5 | (San Marino) AKM Motorsport | 18 | 26 | 9 | 28 | 24 | 22 | 22 | 15 | 19 | 14 | 15 | 22 | 24 | 21 | 18 | 62 |
| 6 | (Italy) Cram Motorsport | 13 | 9 | 6 | 13 | 12 | 10 | 11 | 10 | 7 | 18 | 5 | 15 | 10 | 9 | 10 | 39 |
| 6 | (Italy) Cram Motorsport | 14 | 10 | 8 | 14 | 16 | 23 | 18 | 11 | 9 | 22 | 22 | 23 | 14 | 13 | 25 | 39 |
| 7 | (Spain) Campos Racing | 4 | 11 | 2 | 19 | 22 | 20 | 14 | 14 | 21 | 16 | 12 | 10 | 11 | 10 | 14 | 32 |
| 7 | (Spain) Campos Racing | 16 | 17 | 15 | 21 | 26 | 21 | 16 | 17 | 22 | 19 | 18 | 13 | 21 | 11 | 16 | 32 |
| 8 | (Germany) Mathilda Racing | 23 | 23 | 3 | 20 | 27 | 18 | 21 | 6 | 16 | 13 | 9 | 11 | | | | 25 |
| 8 | (Germany) Mathilda Racing | | | | Ret | 31 | 24 | 27 | 27 | 27 | 20 | 19 | 21 | | | | 25 |
| 9 | (Austria) Renauer Motorsport | 8 | 25 | 14 | 16 | 21 | Ret | | | | | | | | | | 4 |
| 10 | (Slovenia) AS Motorsport Olimpija | 9 | 24 | Ret | 22 | 23 | 26 | 24 | 19 | 24 | 17 | 10 | 14 | 13 | 16 | 20 | 3 |
| 10 | (Slovenia) AS Motorsport Olimpija | 29 | Ret | Ret | 24 | 29 | 29 | 26 | 20 | 26 | 29 | 17 | 18 | 19 | 17 | 22 | 3 |
| 11 | (Denmark) STEP Motorsport | | | | | | | | | | | | | 25 | 19 | 24 | 0 |
| Pos | Team | R1 | R2 | R3 | R1 | R2 | R3 | R1 | R2 | R3 | R1 | R2 | R3 | R1 | R2 | R3 | Points |
| Pos | Team | EST (Portugal) | | | POR (Portugal) | | | CRT (Spain) | | | ARA (Spain) | | | CAT (Spain) | | | Points |
