= WSK Super Master Series =

International kart racing competition in Italy

- Category: Kart racing
- Region: International
- Affiliations: WSK Promotion; Automobile Club d'Italia; CIK-FIA
- Inaugural season: 2010; 16 years ago, as the WSK Master Series
- Classes: OK, OK-J, KZ2, OKN-J, Mini Gr.3, Mini U10
- Drivers' champion: (Ukraine) Lev Krutogolov; (OK, Energy–IAME); (Brazil) Antônio Pizzonia Neto; (OK-J, Parolin–TM); Maksim Orlov; (KZ2, Sodi–TM); (Italy) Niccolò Perico; (OKN-J, Kart Republic–IAME); (Malta) Zane Pace; (Mini Gr.3, Tony Kart–Vortex); (United States) Zayne Burgess; (U10, Parolin–TM)
- Most titles: (Italy) Marco Ardigò (5)
- Official website: wskarting.it

The WSK Super Master Series, formerly known as the WSK Master Series, is a kart racing competition organised by WSK Promotion and sanctioned by ACI Sport. Hosted annually since 2010, it is one of 11 competitions on the international kart racing calendar in CIK-FIA classes.

The five-round championship is held across Italy in six classes: OK, OK-J, KZ2, OKN-J, Mini Gr.3, and U10. It was previously contested in KZ, KF, and KF-J.

Notable champions have included five Formula One drivers: Antonio Giovinazzi (2010–2011, KF2), Max Verstappen (2012, KF2; 2013, KZ2), Andrea Kimi Antonelli (2019, OK-J), Arvid Lindblad (2020, OK-J), and Rafael Câmara (2021, OK). Verstappen became the first champion to progress to win the Formula One World Drivers' Championship in 2021, followed by Antonelli in 2026. Marco Ardigò won a record five titles in the gearbox category between 2012 and 2018. Beitske Visser (2010, KZ2) is the only female champion.

== History ==
The WSK Master Series was founded by WSK Promotion in 2010 as an three-round championship across Italy in KF2, KF3, KZ2, with non-scoring rounds in 60 Mini. In KZ2, Beitske Visser became the first female champion of the series. It was renamed the WSK Super Master Series in 2014. Since 2025, it has served as the season-opening competition in CIK-FIA classes, following the demise of the South Garda Winter Cup and the WSK Champions Cup, with 552 entrants in six classes: OK, OK-J, KZ2, OKN-J, Mini Gr.3, and U10.

== Champions ==
Key
Drivers
*	Driver has competed in Formula One		
†	Formula One World Drivers' Champion		
‡	FIA World Champion in an auto racing discipline		
Tyres
B	Bridgestone	L	LeCont
C	Carlisle	M	Maxxis
D	Dunlop	M	MG Tires
G	Goodyear	M	Mojo
K	Komet	V	Vega

=== Senior class (2010–present) ===
Year	Champion	Chassis	Engine	Tyres	Runner-up	Third place	Class	Stroke
2010	(Italy) Antonio Giovinazzi*‡	Top-Kart	Parilla	V	(United Kingdom) Jordan King	(United Kingdom) Chris Lock	KF2	125cc
2011	(Italy) Antonio Giovinazzi*‡ (2)	Top-Kart	Parilla	V	(Italy) Stefano Cucco	(Russia) Egor Orudzhev	KF2	125cc
2012	(Netherlands) Max Verstappen†	Intrepid	TM	V	(Italy) Felice Tiene	(United Kingdom) Tom Joyner	KF2	125cc
2013	(France) Dorian Boccolacci	Energy	TM	V	(United Kingdom) Ben Barnicoat	(Poland) Karol Basz	KF	125cc
2014	(United Kingdom) Callum Ilott	Zanardi	Parilla	D	(Italy) Alessio Lorandi	(Poland) Karol Basz	KF	125cc
2015	(Denmark) Nicklas Nielsen	Tony Kart	Vortex	V	(Poland) Karol Basz	(Italy) Felice Tiene	KF	125cc
2016	(Italy) Lorenzo Travisanutto	Tony Kart	Vortex	V	(Poland) Karol Basz	(Spain) Pedro Hiltbrand	OK	125cc
2017	(France) Clément Novalak	Tony Kart	Vortex	B	(Poland) Karol Basz	(Belgium) Ulysse de Pauw	OK	125cc
2018	(Germany) Hannes Janker	Kart Republic	Parilla	B	(Denmark) Nicklas Nielsen	(United Kingdom) Jonny Edgar	OK	125cc
2019	(United Kingdom) Dexter Patterson	Kart Republic	IAME	B	(United Kingdom) Taylor Barnard	(Italy) Lorenzo Travisanutto	OK	125cc
2020	(Russia) Nikita Bedrin	Tony Kart	Vortex	B	(Italy) Andrea Kimi Antonelli†	(Spain) Pedro Hiltbrand	OK	125cc
2021	(Brazil) Rafael Câmara*	Kart Republic	IAME	L	(Italy) Andrea Kimi Antonelli†	(United Kingdom) Arvid Lindblad*	OK	125cc
2022	(United Kingdom) Joe Turney	Tony Kart	Vortex	L	(Japan) Kean Nakamura-Berta	(United Kingdom) Freddie Slater	OK	125cc
2023	(United States) James Egozi	Tony Kart	Vortex	L	(Belgium) Thomas Strauven	(Netherlands) René Lammers	OK	125cc
2024	(Belgium) Ean Eyckmans	Birel ART	TM	L	(Ukraine) Oleksandr Bondarev	(Italy) Sebastiano Pacan	OK	125cc
2025	(Belgium) Dries Van Langendonck	Kart Republic	IAME	L	(Spain) Christian Costoya	(Czech Republic) Jindřich Pešl	OK	125cc
2026	(Ukraine) Lev Krutogolov	Energy	IAME	L	(United Kingdom) Zac Drummond	(Spain) Benjamin Mañach	OK	125cc

=== Junior classes (2010–present) ===
==== Primary junior class (2010–present) ====
Year	Champion	Chassis	Engine	Tyres	Runner-up	Third place	Class	Stroke
2010	(Denmark) Nicklas Nielsen	DR	Parilla	D	(Romania) Robert Vișoiu	(Italy) Giuliano Maria Niceta	KF3	125cc
2011	(Italy) Antonio Fuoco	Top-Kart	TM	V	(Sweden) Robin Hansson	(Denmark) Nicolai Sylvest	KF3	125cc
2012	(United Kingdom) Callum Ilott	Zanardi	Parilla	V	(Italy) Alessio Lorandi	(United Kingdom) George Russell*	KF3	125cc
2013	(Italy) Alessio Lorandi	Tony Kart	Parilla	V	(United Kingdom) Lando Norris†	(Russia) Nikita Sitnikov	KF-J	125cc
2014	(United Kingdom) Enaam Ahmed	FA Kart	Vortex	V	(United Kingdom) Dan Ticktum	(Italy) Leonardo Lorandi	KF-J	125cc
2015	(France) Clément Novalak	Tony Kart	Vortex	V	(United States) Logan Sargeant*	(Belgium) Ulysse de Pauw	KF-J	125cc
2016	(Morocco) Sami Taoufik	FA Kart	Vortex	V	(Denmark) Noah Watt	(Belgium) Ulysse de Pauw	OK-J	125cc
2017	(Italy) Andrea Rosso	Tony Kart	Vortex	V	(Italy) Mattia Michelotto	(United Kingdom) Harry Thompson	OK-J	125cc
2018	(Italy) Gabriele Minì	Parolin	Parilla	V	(Brazil) Gabriel Bortoleto*	(Estonia) Paul Aron	OK-J	125cc
2019	(Italy) Andrea Kimi Antonelli†	Kart Republic	IAME	V	(Russia) Artem Severiukhin	(United Arab Emirates) Jamie Day	OK-J	125cc
2020	(United Kingdom) Arvid Lindblad*	Kart Republic	IAME	V	(Poland) Karol Pasiewicz	(Italy) Brando Badoer	OK-J	125cc
2021	(United Arab Emirates) Rashid Al Dhaheri	Parolin	TM	V	(Brazil) Matheus Ferreira	(Jamaica) Alex Powell	OK-J	125cc
2022	(Ukraine) Oleksandr Bondarev	LN Kart	Vortex	V	(Russia) Kirill Dzitiev	(Russia) Dmitry Matveev	OK-J	125cc
2023	(Russia) Stepan Antonov	Kart Republic	IAME	V	(Italy) Filippo Sala	(Spain) Christian Costoya	OK-J	125cc
2024	(Austria) Niklas Schaufler	Birel ART	TM	V	(Belgium) Dries Van Langendonck	(Netherlands) Dean Hoogendoorn	OK-J	125cc
2025	(Netherlands) Dean Hoogendoorn	Kart Republic	IAME	V	(United Kingdom) Noah Baglin	(Canada) Ilie Tristan Crisan	OK-J	125cc
2026	(Brazil) Antônio Pizzonia Neto	Parolin	TM	V	(United Kingdom) Will Green	(Netherlands) Daniel Mirón	OK-J	125cc

==== Secondary junior class (2024–present) ====
Year	Champion	Chassis	Engine	Tyres	Runner-up	Third place	Class	Stroke
2024	(Romania) Bogdan Cosma Cristofor	Exprit	TM	V	(Slovakia) Alex Molota	(Italy) Valerio Viapiana	OKN-J	125cc
2025	(United States) Lucas Palacio	Kart Republic	IAME	V	(Italy) Michele Orlando	(Italy) Gioele Girardello	OKN-J	125cc
2026	(Italy) Niccolò Perico	Kart Republic	IAME	V	(Italy) Luigi D'Ascoli	(Sweden) Elton Hedfors	OKN-J	125cc

=== Gearbox classes (2010–present) ===
==== Primary gearbox class (2010–present) ====
Year	Champion	Chassis	Engine	Tyres	Runner-up	Third place	Class	Stroke
2010	(Netherlands) Beitske Visser	Intrepid	TM	D	(Italy) Marco Zanchetta	(Italy) Simone Brenna	KZ2	125cc
2011	(Italy) Paolo De Conto	Energy	TM	D	(Italy) Marco Ardigò	(Netherlands) Beitske Visser	KZ1	125cc
2012	(Italy) Marco Ardigò	Tony Kart	Vortex	V	(Netherlands) Jorrit Pex	(France) Arnaud Kozlinski	KZ1	125cc
2013	(Netherlands) Max Verstappen†	CRG	TM	B	(United Kingdom) Ben Hanley	(Italy) Riccardo Negro	KZ2	125cc
2014	(Italy) Marco Ardigò (2)	Tony Kart	Vortex	B	(Netherlands) Bas Lammers	(Belgium) Jonathan Thonon	KZ2	125cc
2015	(Italy) Marco Ardigò (3)	Tony Kart	Vortex	V	(Finland) Simo Puhakka	(France) Anthony Abbasse	KZ2	125cc
2016	(Italy) Marco Ardigò (4)	Tony Kart	Vortex	V	(France) Anthony Abbasse	(France) Jérémy Iglesias	KZ	125cc
2017	(Netherlands) Bas Lammers	Sodi	TM	B	(Czech Republic) Patrik Hájek	(France) Anthony Abbasse	KZ2	125cc
2018	(Italy) Marco Ardigò (5)	Tony Kart	Vortex	B	(Italy) Alessandro Irlando	(Italy) Paolo De Conto	KZ2	125cc
2019	(Netherlands) Bas Lammers (2)	Sodi	TM	B	(France) Adrien Renaudin	(Italy) Marco Ardigò	KZ2	125cc
2020	(Finland) Simo Puhakka	Tony Kart	Vortex	V	(Italy) Giuseppe Palomba	(Italy) Fabian Federer	KZ2	125cc
2021	(Netherlands) Marijn Kremers	Birel ART	TM	V	(Finland) Juho Valtanen	(Sweden) Viktor Gustavsson	KZ2	125cc
2022	(Netherlands) Senna van Walstijn	Sodi	TM	V	(Italy) Matteo Viganò	(Spain) Pedro Hiltbrand	KZ2	125cc
2023	(Italy) Cristian Bertuca	Birel ART	TM	V	(France) Émilien Denner	(Italy) Matteo Viganò	KZ2	125cc
2024	(Italy) Cristian Bertuca (2)	Birel ART	TM	V	(Estonia) Markus Kajak	(France) Tom Leuillet	KZ2	125cc
2025	(Netherlands) Senna van Walstijn (2)	Sodi	TM	V	(Italy) Cristian Bertuca	(Romania) Daniel Vasile	KZ2	125cc
2026	Maksim Orlov	Sodi	TM	L	(Netherlands) Senna van Walstijn	(Czech Republic) Marek Skřivan	KZ2	125cc

==== Secondary gearbox class (2011–2016) ====
Year	Champion	Chassis	Engine	Tyres	Runner-up	Third place	Class	Stroke
2011	(Italy) Marco Zanchetta	CKR	TM	D	(Italy) Alfredo Daniele Delli Compagni	(Croatia) Kristijan Habulin	KZ2	125cc
2012	(United Kingdom) Jordon Lennox-Lamb	CRG	Maxter	D	(Czech Republic) Jan Midrla	(Italy) Francesco Celenta	KZ2	125cc
2013 – 2015	No secondary gearbox class contested							
2016	(Italy) Leonardo Lorandi	Tony Kart	Vortex	V	(Italy) Giacomo Pollini	(Italy) Alessandro Irlando	KZ2	125cc

=== Mini classes (2010–present) ===
==== Under-12 class (2010–present) ====
Year	Champion	Chassis	Engine	Tyres	Runner-up	Third place	Class	Stroke
2010	No title awarded							
2011	No title awarded							
2012	(Italy) Leonardo Lorandi	Tony Kart	LKE	L	(Italy) Pietro Mazzola	(Spain) Eliseo Martinez	60M	60cc
2013	(Spain) Eliseo Martinez	CRG	LKE	L	(Italy) Leonardo Marseglia	(India) Kush Maini	60M	60cc
2014	(Italy) Nicola Abrusci	Tony Kart	LKE	V	(Malaysia) Muizzuddin Gafar	(Ukraine) Makar Mizevych	60M	60cc
2015	(Norway) Dennis Hauger	CRG	TM	V	(Italy) Mattia Muller	(Italy) Leonardo Marseglia	60M	60cc
2016	(Italy) Michael Paparo	Formula K	TM	V	(Italy) Francesco Pizzi	(Italy) Gabriele Minì	60M	60cc
2017	(Italy) Gabriele Minì	Parolin	TM	V	(Russia) Nikita Bedrin	(Italy) Andrea Kimi Antonelli†	60M	60cc
2018	(Norway) Martinius Stenshorne	Parolin	TM	V	(Poland) Tymek Kucharczyk	(Italy) Andrea Kimi Antonelli†	60M	60cc
2019	(United Arab Emirates) Rashid Al Dhaheri	Parolin	TM	V	(Belgium) Ean Eyckmans	(Jamaica) Alex Powell	60M	60cc
2020	(Russia) Dmitry Matveev	Energy	TM	V	(Japan) Kean Nakamura-Berta	(Poland) Maciej Gładysz	60M	60cc
2021	(Netherlands) René Lammers	Parolin	IAME	V	(Italy) Emanuele Olivieri	(Spain) Christian Costoya	60M	60cc
2022	(Czech Republic) Jindřich Pešl	Parolin	IAME	V	(Spain) Christian Costoya	(Belgium) Dries Van Langendonck	60M	60cc
2023	(Turkey) İskender Zülfikari	Parolin	IAME	V	(Netherlands) Dean Hoogendoorn	(Romania) Cosma Cristofor Bogdan	Gr.3	60cc
2024	(Australia) William Calleja	Parolin	TM	V	(Netherlands) Daniel Mirón	(Italy) Cristian Blandino	Gr.3	60cc
2025	(Italy) Niccolò Perico	Kart Republic	IAME	V	(Portugal) Xavier Lazaro	(France) Stan Ratajski	Gr.3	60cc
2026	(Malta) Zane Pace	Tony Kart	Vortex	V	(Morocco) Nahyl El Gahoudi	(United Kingdom) Daniel Ferguson	Gr.3	60cc

==== Under-10 class (2023–present) ====
Year	Champion	Chassis	Engine	Tyres	Runner-up	Third place	Class	Stroke
2023	(Ukraine) Oleksandr Legenkyi	Kart Republic	IAME	V	(Russia) Daniil Kutskov	(Belgium) Antoine Venant	U10	60cc
2024	(Italy) Niccolò Perico	Energy	IAME	V	(United States) Lucas Palacio	(Sweden) Carl Nellegård	U10	60cc
2025	(United States) Josh Bergman	Kart Republic	IAME	V	(Italy) Daniel Pasquali	(Netherlands) Wynn Godschalk	U10	60cc
2026	(United States) Zayne Burgess	Parolin	TM	V	(France) Sasha Miras	(United States) Blake Hsueh	U10	60cc

== See also ==
- WSK Champions Cup
- WSK Euro Series
- WSK Final Cup
