= Formula Winter Series =

Formula 4 Series

- Category: Formula 4
- Country: Spain
- Inaugural season: 2023
- Drivers' champion: (Belgium) Dries Van Langendonck
- Teams' champion: (New Zealand) Rodin Motorsport

The Formula Winter Series is a motor racing championship for open wheel, formula racing cars regulated according to FIA Formula 4 regulations, based in Spain. The series is organised by Gedlich Racing with the approval of the RFEDA.

The weekends include support series GT Winter Series (since 2019) and GT4 Winter Series (since 2023), also organised by Gedlich Racing under licence with the SRO.

== Cars ==
The cars used in this series are Tatuus F4-T421 powered by an Abarth engine.

== Format ==
As of 2026, the series operates across five rounds with three races each. The race one grid is set by the fastest lap time in qualifying one, the race two grid is set by the second-fastest time in qualifying one, and the race three grid is set by the fastest time in qualifying two.

== Champions ==
=== Drivers ===
Season	Driver	Team	Races	Poles	Wins	Podiums	Fastest lap	Points	Margins
2023	(Poland) Kacper Sztuka	(Germany) US Racing	6 of 6	4	5	6	4	151	35
2024	(Australia) Griffin Peebles	(Netherlands) MP Motorsport	11 of 12	3	4	7	5	171	19
2025	(Brazil) Gabriel Gomez	(Germany) US Racing	11 of 12	4	3	9	3	204	41
2026	(Belgium) Dries Van Langendonck	(New Zealand) Rodin Motorsport	11 of 15	9	9	12	8	308	149

=== Teams ===
Season	Team	Poles	Wins	Podiums	Fastest lap
2023	(Germany) US Racing	6	7	22	8
2024	(Netherlands) MP Motorsport	6	5	12	6
2025	(Germany) US Racing	7	6	18	7
2026	(New Zealand) Rodin Motorsport	11	9	19	8

=== Rookie ===
Season	Driver	Team
2023	(Australia) Gianmarco Pradel	(Germany) US Racing
2024	(Poland) Maciej Gładysz	(Netherlands) MP Motorsport
2025	(Republic of Ireland) Fionn McLaughlin	(United Kingdom) Hitech TGR
2026	(Belgium) Dries Van Langendonck	(New Zealand) Rodin Motorsport

== Circuits ==
- **Bold** denotes a circuit is used in the 2026 season.
- **Italic** denotes a future circuit will be used in the 2027 season.

Number	Circuit	Rounds	Years
1	(Spain) **Circuito Ricardo Tormo**	4	2023–present
1	(Spain) **Circuit de Barcelona-Catalunya**	4	2023–present
3	(Spain) **MotorLand Aragón**	3	2024–2026
4	(Spain) **Circuito de Jerez**	2	2023–2024, 2027
4	(Portugal) **Algarve International Circuit**	2	2025–present
6	(Spain) Circuito de Navarra	1	2023
6	(Portugal) **Circuito do Estoril**	1	2026
