= Martin Molnár =

Hungarian racing driver

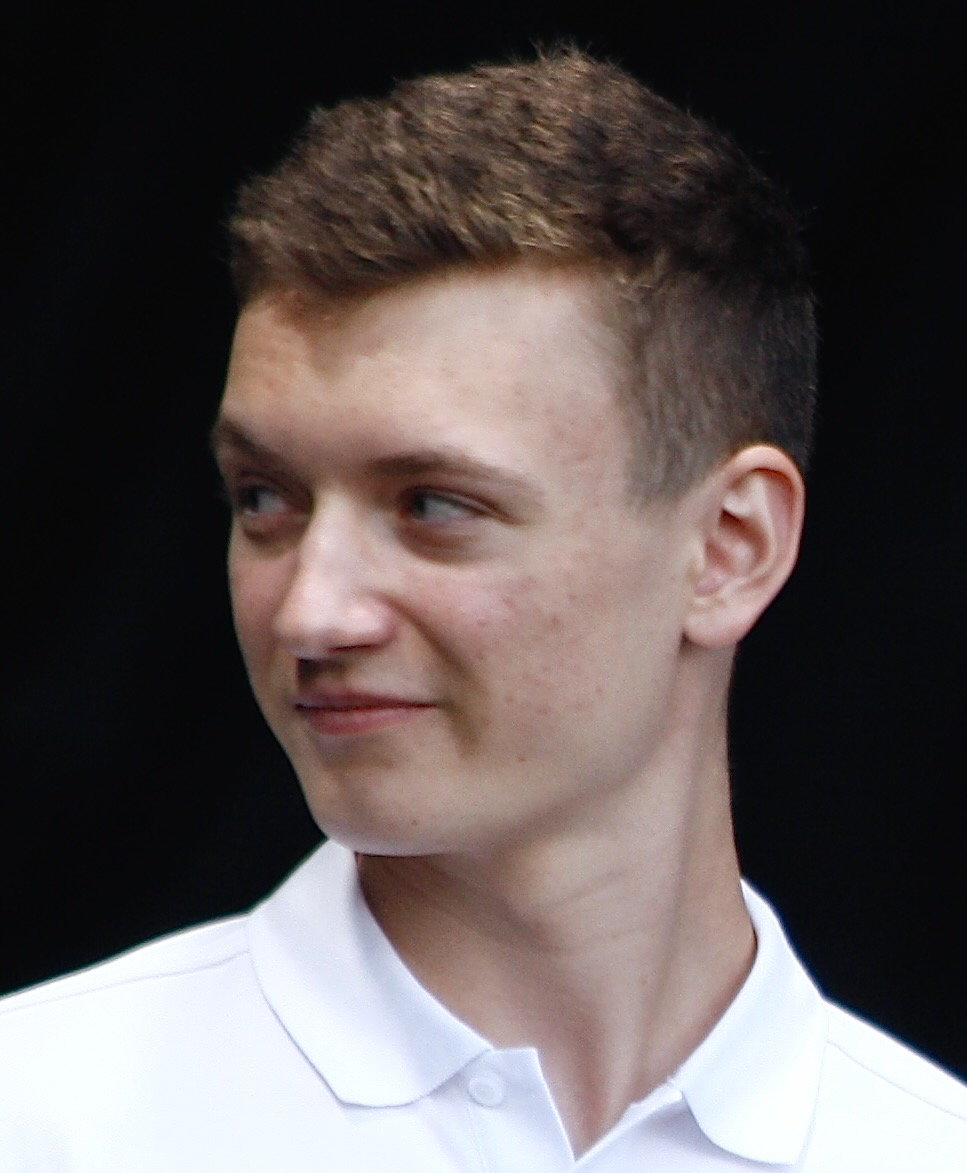
- Nationality: (Hungary) Hungarian
- Born: 21 August 2008 (age 18) Budapest, Hungary

GB3 Championship career
- Debut season: 2026
- Current team: Rodin Motorsport
- Car number: 2
- Starts: 2
- Wins: 0
- Podiums: 1
- Poles: 0
- Fastest laps: 0
- Best finish: TBD in 2026

Previous series
- 2025 2024–2025: F4 Middle East; F4 British

Martin Molnár (born 21 August 2008) is a Hungarian racing driver who currently competes in the GB3 Championship with Rodin Motorsport.

He previously finished third in the 2025 F4 British Championship for Virtuosi Racing.

== Career ==
=== Karting (2017–2023) ===
Molnár made his competitive karting debut in 2017, where he came seventh in the Micro Max class of the Hungarian International Open and came 13th following year. After competing in various WSK sanctioned events in 2019, he had his breakout season in 2020, where he won three karting titles in the Mini Max category of the Rotax Max Challenge Austria, Rotax Max Challenge Central-Eastern Europe and the CEZ Karting Trophy. He also came fifth in the Rotax Max Challenge International Trophy.

In late 2021, Molnár moved up to the OK Junior class and came runner-up in both the 49th and 50th editions of the Trofeo delle Industrie. He also came eighth on his CIK-FIA World Championship debut in 2022.

Molnár stepped up to the OK category in late 2022, and in 2023 he won the 27° South Garda Winter Cup and finished runner-up to the WSK Champions Cup.

=== Formula 4 (2024–2025) ===
==== 2024 ====
After not winning the 2024 Richard Mille Young Talent Academy shootout, Molnár made his single-seater and Formula 4 debut in the 2024 F4 British Championship, driving for Virtuosi Racing, where he partnered Yuhao Fu and Maxwell Dodds.

By a significant margin, Molnár was the best driver in the team and the only one to get a podium. Molnár grabbed five podiums throughout the latter half of the season from Circuit Zandvoort and onwards. He finished 8th in the drivers championship with 117.5 points and also beat Mercedes Junior Yuanpu Cui to the Rookies Cup by eleven points.

Molnár also won the inaugural Jake Cook Memorial Award, awarded by the team managers to the driver with the most improvement during the season.

==== 2025 ====
Molnár kicked off his 2025 Formula 4 campaign with the 2025 F4 Middle East Championship driving for Evans GP. Molnár got points in the first five races and maintained a consistent streak, which was halted by a retirement in the third race of the second round at the Yas Marina Circuit, which was caused by a collision with Oleksandr Bondarev. Later, he matched his best result in the championship of seventh in the second race of the fourth round at Yas Marina Circuit. Molnár retired from the second race of the fifth and final round at the Lusail International Circuit after Salim Hanna crashed on top of him on lap seven. He finished the championship in 13th with 42 points.

Following his winter series venture, Molnár continued his partnership with Virtuosi Racing for the 2025 F4 British Championship. He got a podium in the first round at Donington Park and collected two more podiums at Silverstone Circuit.

After achieving another second place at Snetterton Circuit, Molnár won his first ever race a round later in the first race of Thruxton Circuit and collected a second place in the final race.

At Oulton Park, Molnár got his first ever pole positions in the first and third race, converting them to second and eighth places, respectively. He recorded his final win of the series at Circuit Zandvoort, and in the latter half of the season he lost his lead on the championship, which went to Irishman and Red Bull Junior Team driver, Fionn McLaughlin. James Piszcyk also overtook him in the championship and Molnár ended up third in the standings with two wins, three pole positions, seven fastest laps, ten podiums and 277 points.

=== Formula Regional (2026–) ===
Molnár stepped up to the GB3 Championship in 2026 with Rodin Motorsport.

== Personal life ==
Molnár was signed by Motorsport Talent Management in 2021, and is currently managed by former racing driver Tamás Pál Kiss.

== Karting record ==
=== Karting career summary ===
| Season | Series | Team | Position |
|---|---|---|---|
| 2017 | Hungarian International Open – Micro Max | Hargitai Racing | 7th |
| 2018 | Hungarian International Open – Micro Max | Hargitai Racing | 13th |
| 2018 | FIA Central European Zone – Rotax Micro | Hargitai Racing | |
| 2018 | IAME Series Mediterranean Cup – Micro Max | | 7th |
| 2019 | 24° South Garda Winter Cup – Mini ROK | Xforce Racing KFT | |
| 2019 | WSK Champions Cup – 60 Mini | XForce Racing Team | |
| 2019 | WSK Super Master Series – 60 Mini | XForce Racing Team | 89th |
| 2019 | FIA Central European Zone – Rotax Mini | XForce Racing Team | 4th |
| 2019 | FIA Central European Zone – Rotax Micro | XForce Racing Team | 24th |
| 2019 | ROK Cup Superfinal – Mini ROK | Team Driver Racing Kart | |
| 2019 | 48° Trofeo delle Industrie – 60 Mini | Team Driver Racing Kart | 24th |
| 2019 | WSK Open Cup – 60 Mini | Team Driver Racing Kart | 59th |
| 2019 | WSK Final Cup – 60 Mini | Team Driver Racing Kart | |
| 2019 | Austrian Karting-Meisterschaft - Div IV – Rotax Mini Max | Xforce Racing | 3rd |
| 2020 | WSK Champions Cup – Mini | AV Racing | |
| 2020 | WSK Super Master Series – 60 Mini | AV Racing | 45th |
| 2020 | 25° South Garda Winter Cup – Mini ROK | AV Racing | 18th |
| 2020 | Andrea Margutti Trophy – 60 Mini | AV Racing | 27th |
| 2020 | WSK Euro Series – 60 Mini | AV Racing | 40th |
| 2020 | Rotax Max Challenge International Trophy – Mini Max | KMS Europe KFT | 5th |
| 2020 | CEZ Karting Trophy – Mini Max | XForce Racing Team | 1st |
| 2020 | Rotax Max Challenge Austria – Mini Max | XForce Racing Team | 1st |
| 2020 | Rotax Max Challenge Central-Eastern Europe – Mini Max | XForce Racing Team | 1st |
| 2020 | IAME International Games – X30 Junior | Kart Republic Spain | 32nd |
| 2021 | WSK Champions Cup – OK Junior | KR Motorsport | |
| 2021 | WSK Super Master Series – OK Junior | KR Motorsport | 45th |
| 2021 | WSK Euro Series – OK Junior | Revesz TRT KFT | 55th |
| 2021 | CIK-FIA European Karting Championship – OK Junior | Revesz TRT KFT | 49th |
| 2021 | Deutsche Kart Meisterschaft – OK Junior | Revesz TRT KFT | 47th |
| 2021 | Champions of the Future – OK Junior | Revesz TRT KFT | 70th |
| 2021 | WSK Open Cup – OK Junior | Revesz TRT KFT | 21st |
| 2021 | 26° South Garda Winter Cup – OK Junior | Revesz TRT KFT | 33rd |
| 2021 | WSK Final Cup – OK Junior | Revesz TRT KFT | 19th |
| 2021 | Italian ACI Karting Championship – OK Junior | | 5th |
| 2021 | IAME Euro Series – X30 Junior | Team Driver Racing Kart | 55th |
| 2021 | 49° Trofeo delle Industrie – OK Junior | Team Driver Racing Kart | 2nd |
| 2022 | WSK Champions Cup – OK Junior | Team Driver Racing Kart | 16th |
| 2022 | WSK Super Master Series – OK Junior | KR Motorsport | 18th |
| 2022 | Champions of the Future – Winter Series – OK Junior | Energy Corse Srl | 19th |
| 2022 | Champions of the Future – OK Junior | Energy Corse Srl | 11th |
| 2022 | CIK-FIA European Karting Championship – OK Junior | Energy Corse Srl | 21st |
| 2022 | WSK Euro Series – OK Junior | Energy Corse Srl | 7th |
| 2022 | CIK-FIA World Championship – OK Junior | Energy Corse Srl | 8th |
| 2022 | WSK Open Cup – OK Junior | Energy Corse Srl | 21st |
| 2022 | 50° Trofeo delle Industrie – OK Junior | Energy Corse Srl | 2nd |
| 2022 | WSK Final Cup – OK | Energy Corse Srl | 26th |
| 2022 | Italian ACI Karting Championship – OK Junior | | 24th |
| 2022 | SKUSA SuperNationals XXV – KA100 Jr. | Nash Motorsportz | 14th |
| 2023 | WSK Champions Cup – OK | | 2nd |
| 2023 | WSK Super Master Series – OK | Energy Corse | 23rd |
| 2023 | 27° South Garda Winter Cup – OK | Energy Corse | 1st |
| 2023 | CIK-FIA European Karting Championship – OK Senior | | 33rd |

== Racing record ==
=== Racing career summary ===
| Season | Series | Team | Races | Wins | Poles | F/Laps | Podiums | Points | Position |
|---|---|---|---|---|---|---|---|---|---|
| 2024 | F4 British Championship | Virtuosi Racing | 30 | 0 | 0 | 0 | 5 | 117.5 | 8th |
| 2025 | F4 Middle East Championship | Evans GP | 15 | 0 | 0 | 0 | 0 | 42 | 13th |
| 2025 | F4 British Championship | Virtuosi Racing | 30 | 2 | 3 | 7 | 10 | 277 | **3rd** |
| 2026 | GB3 Championship | Rodin Motorsport | 22 | 0 | 2 | 1 | 7 | 377 | 4th |

* Season still in progress.

=== Complete F4 British Championship results ===
(key) (Races in bold indicate pole position; races in italics indicate fastest lap)

| Year | Team | 1 | 2 | 3 | 4 | 5 | 6 | 7 | 8 | 9 | 10 | 11 | 12 | 13 | 14 | 15 | 16 | 17 | 18 | 19 | 20 | 21 | 22 | 23 | 24 | 25 | 26 | 27 | 28 | 29 | 30 | 31 | 32 | DC | Points |
|---|---|---|---|---|---|---|---|---|---|---|---|---|---|---|---|---|---|---|---|---|---|---|---|---|---|---|---|---|---|---|---|---|---|---|---|
| 2024 | Virtuosi Racing | DPN; 1; 15 | DPN; 2 Ret | DPN; 3 C | BHI; 1; 9 | BHI; 2; 9^{4} | BHI; 3; 10 | SNE; 1; 10 | SNE; 2; 16 | SNE; 3; 9 | THR; 1; 14 | THR; 2; 13 | THR; 3; 8 | SILGP; 1; 13 | SILGP; 2; 16^{2} | SILGP; 3; 17 | ZAN; 1; 3 | ZAN; 2; 7^{2} | ZAN; 3; 5 | KNO; 1; 3 | KNO; 2; 10 | KNO; 3; 2 | DPGP; 1; 14 | DPGP; 2; 10 | DPGP; 3; 12^{3} | DPGP; 4; 9 | SILN; 1; 9 | SILN; 2 C | SILN; 3; 3 | BHGP; 1; 9 | BHGP; 2; 4^{2} | BHGP; 3; 3^{1} | BHGP; 4; 13 | 8th | 117.5 |
| 2025 | Virtuosi Racing | DPN; 1; 7 | DPN; 2; 2^{3} | DPN; 3; 5 | SILGP; 1; 3 | SILGP; 2; 10 | SILGP; 3; 2 | SNE; 1; 5 | SNE; 2; 9 | SNE; 3; 2 | THR; 1; 1 | THR; 2; 8^{2} | THR; 3; 2 | **OUL**; **1**; 2 | OUL; 2; 20 | **OUL**; **3**; 9 | SILGP; 1; 7 | SILGP; 2; 5 | ZAN; 1; 1 | ZAN; 2; 8^{3} | ZAN; 3 Ret | KNO; 1; 5 | KNO; 2; 7^{1} | KNO; 3; 18 | DPGP; 1; 3 | DPGP; 2; 20 | DPGP; 3; 2 | SILN; 1; 8 | SILN; 2; 23 | **SILN**; **3**; 5 | BHGP; 1; 5 | BHGP; 2; 7 | BHGP; 3; 6 | 3rd | 277 |

=== Complete F4 Middle East Championship results ===
(key) (Races in bold indicate pole position; races in italics indicate fastest lap)

| Year | Team | 1 | 2 | 3 | 4 | 5 | 6 | 7 | 8 | 9 | 10 | 11 | 12 | 13 | 14 | 15 | DC | Points |
|---|---|---|---|---|---|---|---|---|---|---|---|---|---|---|---|---|---|---|
| 2025 | Evans GP | YMC1; 1; 11 | YMC1; 2; 9 | YMC1; 3; 8 | YMC2; 1; 7 | YMC2; 2; 9 | YMC2; 3 Ret | DUB; 1; 11 | DUB; 2; 13 | DUB; 3 Ret | YMC3; 1; 14 | YMC3; 2; 7 | YMC3; 3; 11 | LUS; 1; 14 | LUS; 2 Ret | LUS; 3; 8 | 13th | 42 |

=== Complete GB3 Championship results ===
(key) (Races in bold indicate pole position) (Races in italics indicate fastest lap)

| Year | Team | 1 | 2 | 3 | 4 | 5 | 6 | 7 | 8 | 9 | 10 | 11 | 12 | 13 | 14 | 15 | 16 | 17 | 18 | 19 | 20 | 21 | 22 | 23 | 24 | DC | Points |
|---|---|---|---|---|---|---|---|---|---|---|---|---|---|---|---|---|---|---|---|---|---|---|---|---|---|---|---|
| 2026 | Rodin Motorsport | SIL1; 1; 2 | SIL1; 2 DNS | SIL1; 3; 12 | SPA; 1; 3 | SPA; 2; 3 | SPA; 3 C | **HUN**; **1**; 4 | HUN; 2; 2 | HUN; 3; 8^{2} | **RBR**; **1**; 3 | RBR; 2; 4 | RBR; 3; 4^{7} | SIL2; 1; 2 | SIL2; 2; 4 | SIL2; 3; 12 | DON; 1; 4 | DON; 2; 3 | DON; 3; 9^{1} | BRH; 1; 7 | BRH; 2; 4 | BRH; 3; 14 | CAT; 1; 12 | CAT; 2; 6 | CAT; 3; 17 | 4th | 377 |
