= Tommy Harfield =

British racing driver (born 2009)

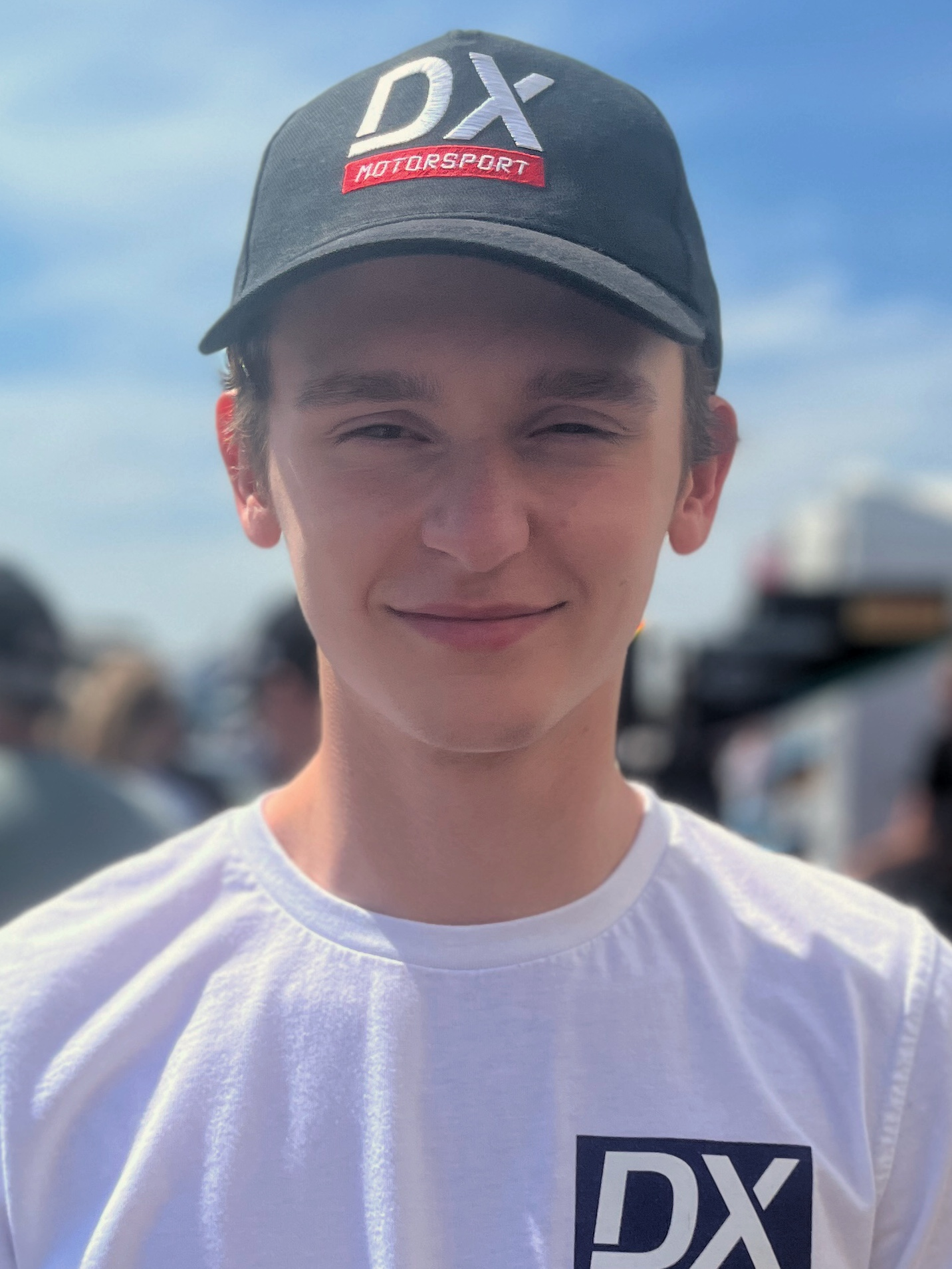
- Harfield in 2026
- Born: 15 October 2008 (age 18); Lower Broadheath, United Kingdom
- Nationality: (United Kingdom) British

F4 British Championship career
- Debut season: 2025
- Current team: Chris Dittmann Racing
- Car number: 21
- Starts: 60
- Wins: 4
- Podiums: 12
- Poles: 4
- Fastest laps: 6
- Best finish: 4th in 2025

Previous series
- 2026 2023–2024: Eurocup-3; BRSCC Fiesta Junior
- Statistics up to date as of 13 November 2026.

Tommy Harfield (born 15 October 2008) is a British racing driver who last competed for Chris Dittmann Racing in the F4 British Championship.

Harfield finished fourth in the standings in 2025, winning three races.

== Career ==
=== Karting (2020–2023) ===
Harfield began his karting career when he was nine, winning races in Honda Cadet karts. He finished within the top-ten during the British Kart Championship, driving in the X30 Mini class. He also achieved several wins and podiums while driving in Junior Rotax. When Harfield was twelve, he won the 2020 Shennington Cadet Championship.

=== Fiesta Junior Championship (2023–2024) ===
Harfield drove in the Fiesta Junior Championship in 2023 and 2024, driving a modified Ford Fiesta with a 1.6 litre engine. In 2023, he competed in two rounds (Silverstone and Donington) midway through the season. For the 2024 season, Harfield drove for Race Car Consultants. He managed to secure two back to back wins at Croft Circuit, but his season was cut short due to a hand injury.

=== Formula 4 (2025–present) ===
==== 2025 ====
Harfield moved to single seaters in 2025, driving in the F4 British Championship for Chris Dittmann Racing (CDR) after having multiple test sessions with the team in 2024. Harfield finished third during the first race of the season at Donington Park (national layout), and had a second-place finish later that weekend during race three. He led the standings until August Raber and Fionn McLaughlin had their penalties from race three rescinded, meaning that Harfield fell to fourth in points heading into Silverstone GP round. At Silverstone, he secured his second podium of the season by finishing in third during race two. He finished second at the second race during the Snetterton round, and had another second-place finish during race two at Knockhill.

For the Donington Park (Grand Prix layout) round, Harfield qualified in second overall behind debutant Dries Van Langendonck, and secured pole position for race one. (Note: The starting grid for race one is determined by every driver's second fastest lap time.) Harfield won race one from pole, marking both his and CDR's first win in the series. By competing the Donington GP round, he was ineligible to score points for the Challenge Cup—sub-championship for drivers who contest seven rounds of the main championship—in which he had a 99-point lead in before his previous scores were all dropped. At the Silverstone National round, Harfield started on pole position for race one and finished second behind McLaughlin. Harfield took his second win in the series during race three, after a back and forth battle between him and McLaughlin. For the season finale at Brands Hatch, Harfield started on first for race two and continued his lead until the end with a lights to flag victory. He finished the season in fourth, with 246 points. At the end of 2025, Harfield made a one-off appearance in Formula Trophy for X GP at Abu Dhabi, finishing second in race two.

==== 2026 ====
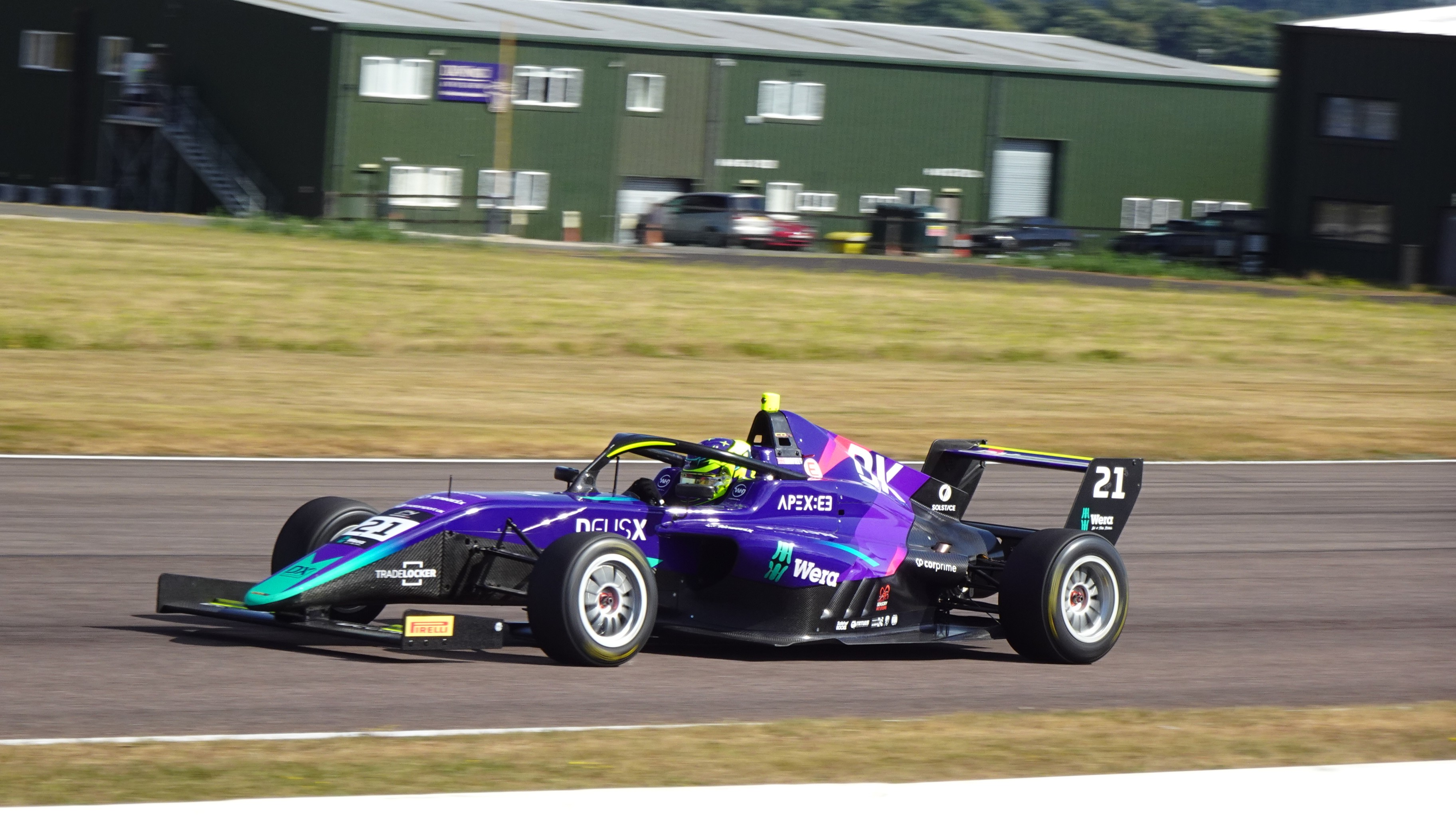
Harfield at Thruxton Circuit in 2026

Harfield continued in British F4 for 2026 with Chris Dittmann Racing. In his second season in the series, Harfield began the season with a podium at Brands Hatch, before taking other podiums at Thruxton and Donington Park, prior to taking his only win of the season at Silverstone to end the year ninth overall.

=== Formula Regional (2026) ===
During 2026, Harfield joined Double R Racing for a part-time campaign in Eurocup-3.

== Karting record ==
=== Karting career summary ===
Season	Series	Team	Position
2020	Shenington Kart Racing Club — Cadet		1st
2020	British Kart Championship — Honda Cadet	Ambition Motorsport	20th
2021	British Kart Championship — X30 Mini	KR-Sport	9th
2021	LGM Championship — X30 Mini		11th
2022	Ultimate Karting Championship — Junior Rotax		65th
2022	British Kart Championship — Junior Rotax	KR-Sport	24th
2022	TVKC Festive Cup — Junior Rotax	KR-Sport	9th
2022	IAME 0 Plate — X30 Junior	KR-Sport	24th
2023	Rotax 0 Plate — Junior Rotax	KR-Sport	19th
2023	British Kart Championship — Junior Rotax	KR-Sport	43rd
2023	Ultimate Karting Championship — Junior Rotax		51st
2023	Whilton Mill Kart Club — Junior Rotax		82nd

== Racing record ==
=== Racing career summary ===
Season	Series	Team	Races	Wins	Poles	F/Laps	Podiums	Points	Position
2023	BRSCC Fiesta Junior Championship		3	0	0	0	0	0	28th
2024	BRSCC Fiesta Junior Championship	Race Car Consultants	11	2	0	0	4	246	12th
2025	F4 British Championship	Chris Dittmann Racing	30	3	2	4	8	246	4th
2025	Formula Trophy	X GP	2	0	0	0	1	18	11th
2026	F4 British Championship	Chris Dittmann Racing	30	1	2	2	4	131	9th
2026	Eurocup-3	Double R Racing	7	0	0	0	0	0	27th

* Season still in progress.

=== Complete F4 British Championship results ===
(key) (Races in bold indicate pole position) (Races in italics indicate fastest lap)

Year	Team	1	2	3	4	5	6	7	8	9	10	11	12	13	14	15	16	17	18	19	20	21	22	23	24	25	26	27	28	29	30	31	32	DC	Points
2025	Chris Dittmann Racing	DPN; 1; 3	DPN; 2; 6^{1}	DPN; 3; 4	SILGP; 1 Ret	SILGP; 2; 3^{2}	SILGP; 3 Ret	SNE; 1; 11	SNE; 2; 2^{1}	SNE; 3; 5	THR; 1; 9	THR; 2; 9^{5}	THR; 3 Ret	OUL; 1; 4	OUL; 2; 12^{4}	OUL; 3; 18	SILGP; 1; 4	SILGP; 2; 2	ZAN; 1; 9	ZAN; 2; 5^{8}	ZAN; 3; 5	KNO; 1; 7	KNO; 2; 2^{3}	KNO; 3; 5	**DPGP**; **1**; 1	DPGP; 2 Ret	DPGP; 3; 9	**SILN**; **1**; 2	SILN; 2; 12	SILN; 3; 1	BHGP; 1; 6	BHGP; 2; 1	BHGP; 3; 9	4th	246
2026	Chris Dittmann Racing	DPN; 1; 11	DPN; 2; 11^{10}	DPN; 3 Ret	BHI; 1; 3	BHI; 2; 4^{4}	BHI; 3; 5	SNE; 1 Ret	SNE; 2; 26	SNE; 3; 10	SILGP; 1; 11	SILGP; 2 Ret	SILGP; 3; 12	ZAN; 1; 5	ZAN; 2; 8	ZAN; 3; 8	THR; 1; 8	THR; 2; 2	THR; 3; 5	**DPGP**; **1**; 2	DPGP; 2; 11^{1}	**DPGP**; **3** Ret	CRO; 1; 11	CRO; 2; 7	CRO; 3; 7	SILN; 1; 7	SILN; 2; 1	SILN; 3; 8	BHGP; 1; 18	BHGP; 2; 17	BHGP; 3; 13			9th	131

* Season still in progress.

=== Complete Formula Trophy results ===
(key) (Races in bold indicate pole position; races in italics indicate fastest lap)

Year	Team	1	2	3	4	5	6	7	DC	Points
2025	X GP	DUB; 1	DUB; 2	DUB; 3	YMC1; 1	YMC1; 2	YMC2; 1; 21	YMC2; 2; 2	11th	18

=== Complete Eurocup-3 results ===
(key) (Races in bold indicate pole position; races in italics indicate fastest lap)

Year	Team	1	2	3	4	5	6	7	8	9	10	11	12	13	14	15	16	17	18	19	Pos	Points
2026	Double R Racing	LEC; 1	LEC; SR	LEC; 2	POR; 1 Ret	POR; 2; 21	IMO; 1; 14	IMO; SR; 12	IMO; 2; 17	MNZ; 1; 20	MNZ; 2; 14	SIL; 1	SIL; 2	JER; 1	JER; SR	JER; 2	HUN; 1	HUN; 2	CAT; 1	CAT; 2	27th	0
