= 2026 F4 British Championship =

Formula 4 motor racing championship

The 2026 Wera Tools F4 British Championship was a multi-event, Formula 4, open-wheel, single-seater, motor racing championship held across United Kingdom. The championship featured a mix of professional motor racing teams and privately funded drivers, competing in Formula 4 cars that conform to the technical regulations for the championship. This, the twelfth season, following on from the British Formula Ford Championship, was the twelfth year that the cars conform to the FIA's Formula 4 regulations. Part of the TOCA tour, it formed part of the extensive program of support categories built up around the BTCC centrepiece.

The season commenced on 18 April at Donington Park, utilising the National circuit, and concluded on 11 October at Brands Hatch, utilising the Grand Prix circuit, after thirty races to be held at ten meetings, eight of them in the support of the 2026 British Touring Car Championship.

Dries Van Langendonck won the Drivers' championship

== Teams and drivers ==
Team	No.	Drivers	Class	Rounds
(United Kingdom) JHR Developments	2	(United Kingdom) Timo Jüngling (Note: Jüngling was barred from competing in Round 8 at Croft due to accumulating 12 penalty points.)	R	1–7, 9
(United Kingdom) JHR Developments	10	(United Kingdom) Lewis Wherrell	R	All
(United Kingdom) JHR Developments	12	(United Kingdom) Haarni Sadiq (Note: Sadiq is a Pakistani driver racing under a British license.)	R	All
(United Kingdom) JHR Developments	22	(United Kingdom) Cameron Nelson	R	All
(United Kingdom) JHR Developments	42	(Singapore) Michael Koh	R	10
(United Kingdom) Hitech	3	(United Arab Emirates) Adam Al Azhari		All
(United Kingdom) Hitech	5	(Sweden) Scott Kin Lindblom (Note: Lindblom was barred from competing in Round 9 at Silverstone due to accumulating 12 penalty points.)		1–8, 10
(United Kingdom) Hitech	6	(Switzerland) Chiara Bättig		All
(United Kingdom) Hitech	7	(United Arab Emirates) Theo Palmer		All
(United Kingdom) Hitech	45	(United Kingdom) Archie Owen	R	9
(United Kingdom) Argenti Motorsport	4	(Sweden) Leon Hedfors	R	All
(United Kingdom) Argenti Motorsport	23	(Canada) Justin Di Lucia		7–10
(United Kingdom) Argenti Motorsport	24	(China) Sun Anzhe	R	All
(United Kingdom) Argenti Motorsport	25	(United Kingdom) Ethan Jeff-Hall		1–8
(United Kingdom) Argenti Motorsport	29	(Australia) James Anagnostiadis	R	10
(United Kingdom) Argenti Motorsport	62	(Germany) Arjen Kräling		9
(United Kingdom) Argenti Motorsport	77	(Bulgaria) Lyuboslav Ruykov	R	5
(United Kingdom) Argenti Motorsport	88	(Norway) Vegard Klemetsen	R	1–4
(United Kingdom) Argenti Motorsport	71	(Indonesia) Qarrar Firhand	R	6
(United Kingdom) Fortec Motorsport	71	(Indonesia) Qarrar Firhand	R	9–10
(United Kingdom) Fortec Motorsport	9	(United Kingdom) Kit Belofsky		1–6
(United Kingdom) Fortec Motorsport	11	(United States) Cash Felber		All
(United Kingdom) Fortec Motorsport	53	(United States) Ethan Carney		All
(United Kingdom) Fortec Motorsport	73	(United States) Roman Felber		All
(United Kingdom) Virtuosi Racing	8	(Australia) George Proudford-Nalder		All
(United Kingdom) Virtuosi Racing	15	(United Kingdom) Joseph Smith (Note: Van Langendonck and Smith were barred from competing in Round 7 at Donington Park due to accumulating 12 penalty points.)		1–6, 8–10
(United Kingdom) Virtuosi Racing	55	(United Kingdom) Jarrett Clark		All
(United Kingdom) Virtuosi Racing	60	(Austria) Emma Felbermayr		4–5
(United Kingdom) Virtuosi Racing	78	(United States) Charlie Smith	R	9–10
(United Kingdom) Virtuosi Racing	91	(United Kingdom) Fred Green		7
(United Kingdom) Chris Dittmann Racing	13	(United States) Henry Mercier		1–9
(United Kingdom) Chris Dittmann Racing	14	(Denmark) Alba Hurup Larsen		4–5
(United Kingdom) Chris Dittmann Racing	21	(United Kingdom) Tommy Harfield		All
(United Kingdom) Chris Dittmann Racing	40	(Poland) Piotr Orzechowski	R	1, 3, 6–10
(United Kingdom) Chris Dittmann Racing	43	(United Kingdom) Daniella Sutton		All
(United Kingdom) Chris Dittmann Racing	57	(Canada) Autumn Fisher	R	2
(United Kingdom) Chris Dittmann Racing	66	(United States) Alexander Vanchev	R	10
(New Zealand) Rodin Motorsport	20	(United Kingdom) Ella Lloyd		1, 4–5
(New Zealand) Rodin Motorsport	26	(United Kingdom) Jesse Phillips	R	10
(New Zealand) Rodin Motorsport	27	(United Kingdom) Alfie Slater		All
(New Zealand) Rodin Motorsport	30	(Republic of Ireland) Alex O'Grady		7
(New Zealand) Rodin Motorsport	32	(South Africa) Ethan Lennon (Note: Lennon is a South African-born British-American driver competing under a South African license.)		All
(New Zealand) Rodin Motorsport	51	(Belgium) Dries Van Langendonck (Note: Van Langendonck and Smith were barred from competing in Round 7 at Donington Park due to accumulating 12 penalty points.)	R	1–6, 8–10
(United Arab Emirates) Xcel Motorsport	33	(South Africa) Cole Hewetson		All
(United Arab Emirates) Xcel Motorsport	44	(Georgia (country)) Mate Kobakhidze	R	All
(United Arab Emirates) Xcel Motorsport	83	(Kuwait) Jaber Al Sabah	R	All
(United Arab Emirates) Xcel Motorsport	96	(United States) Jackson Wolny	R	All

Icon	Legend
R	Rookie

== Race calendar ==
All but one round will be held in the United Kingdom. The schedule was revealed on 29 September 2025.

Round		Circuit	Date	Pole position	Fastest lap	Winning driver	Winning team	Rookie winner
1	R1	(United Kingdom) Donington Park (National Circuit, Leicestershire)	18 April	(Belgium) Dries Van Langendonck	(United Kingdom) Ethan Jeff-Hall	(Belgium) Dries Van Langendonck	(New Zealand) Rodin Motorsport	(Belgium) Dries Van Langendonck
1	R2	(United Kingdom) Donington Park (National Circuit, Leicestershire)	19 April		(United Arab Emirates) Theo Palmer	(South Africa) Ethan Lennon	(New Zealand) Rodin Motorsport	(United Kingdom) Lewis Wherrell
1	R3	(United Kingdom) Donington Park (National Circuit, Leicestershire)	19 April	(Belgium) Dries Van Langendonck	(United Arab Emirates) Theo Palmer (Note: Theo Palmer set the fastest lap but was not classified, so he was ineligible to score the point for it. No bonus point was awarded.)	(United Kingdom) Joseph Smith (Note: Dries Van Langendonck originally won the race, but later received a 5-second time penalty for causing a collision. Joseph Smith, initially classified second, thus inherited the win.)	(United Kingdom) Virtuosi Racing	(Belgium) Dries Van Langendonck
2	R4	(United Kingdom) Brands Hatch (Indy Circuit, Kent)	9 May	(United Arab Emirates) Adam Al Azhari	(United Arab Emirates) Theo Palmer	(United Kingdom) Ethan Jeff-Hall	(United Kingdom) Argenti Motorsport	(United Kingdom) Lewis Wherrell
2	R5	(United Kingdom) Brands Hatch (Indy Circuit, Kent)	10 May		(United Kingdom) Jarrett Clark	(United Kingdom) Jarrett Clark	(United Kingdom) Virtuosi Racing	(Kuwait) Jaber Al Sabah
2	R6	(United Kingdom) Brands Hatch (Indy Circuit, Kent)	10 May	(United Arab Emirates) Adam Al Azhari	(United Kingdom) Alfie Slater	(Belgium) Dries Van Langendonck	(New Zealand) Rodin Motorsport	(Belgium) Dries Van Langendonck
3	R7	(United Kingdom) Snetterton Motor Racing Circuit (300 Circuit, Norfolk)	23 May	(United Kingdom) Lewis Wherrell	(United Kingdom) Lewis Wherrell	(United Kingdom) Lewis Wherrell	(United Kingdom) JHR Developments	(United Kingdom) Lewis Wherrell
3	R8	(United Kingdom) Snetterton Motor Racing Circuit (300 Circuit, Norfolk)	24 May		(United Kingdom) Tommy Harfield	(United Kingdom) Timo Jüngling	(United Kingdom) JHR Developments	(United Kingdom) Timo Jüngling
3	R9	(United Kingdom) Snetterton Motor Racing Circuit (300 Circuit, Norfolk)	24 May	(United Kingdom) Lewis Wherrell	(Sweden) Scott Kin Lindblom	(United Kingdom) Lewis Wherrell	(United Kingdom) JHR Developments	(United Kingdom) Lewis Wherrell
4	R10	(United Kingdom) Silverstone Circuit (Grand Prix Circuit, Northamptonshire)	30 May	(Australia) George Proudford-Nalder	(United Kingdom) Lewis Wherrell	(United Kingdom) Lewis Wherrell	(United Kingdom) JHR Developments	(United Kingdom) Lewis Wherrell
4	R11	(United Kingdom) Silverstone Circuit (Grand Prix Circuit, Northamptonshire)	31 May		(Switzerland) Chiara Bättig	(United Kingdom) Joseph Smith	(United Kingdom) Virtuosi Racing	(United Kingdom) Timo Jüngling
4	R12	(United Kingdom) Silverstone Circuit (Grand Prix Circuit, Northamptonshire)	31 May	(Australia) George Proudford-Nalder	(United Kingdom) Lewis Wherrell	(Australia) George Proudford-Nalder	(United Kingdom) Virtuosi Racing	(United Kingdom) Lewis Wherrell
5	R13	(Netherlands) Circuit Zandvoort (Zandvoort)	11 July	(Belgium) Dries Van Langendonck	(United Kingdom) Tommy Harfield	(Belgium) Dries Van Langendonck	(New Zealand) Rodin Motorsport	(Belgium) Dries Van Langendonck
5	R14	(Netherlands) Circuit Zandvoort (Zandvoort)	12 July		(South Africa) Ethan Lennon	(South Africa) Ethan Lennon	(New Zealand) Rodin Motorsport	(United Kingdom) Cameron Nelson
5	R15	(Netherlands) Circuit Zandvoort (Zandvoort)	12 July	(Belgium) Dries Van Langendonck	(Belgium) Dries Van Langendonck	(Belgium) Dries Van Langendonck	(New Zealand) Rodin Motorsport	(Belgium) Dries Van Langendonck
6	R16	(United Kingdom) Thruxton Circuit (Hampshire)	25 July	(United Arab Emirates) Theo Palmer	(United Kingdom) Joseph Smith	(United Arab Emirates) Theo Palmer	(United Kingdom) Hitech	(United Kingdom) Lewis Wherrell
6	R17	(United Kingdom) Thruxton Circuit (Hampshire)	26 July		(United Arab Emirates) Adam Al Azhari	(United Arab Emirates) Adam Al Azhari	(United Kingdom) Hitech	(Kuwait) Jaber Al Sabah
6	R18	(United Kingdom) Thruxton Circuit (Hampshire)	26 July	(Kuwait) Jaber Al Sabah	(United Kingdom) Joseph Smith	(Kuwait) Jaber Al Sabah	(United Arab Emirates) Xcel Motorsport	(Kuwait) Jaber Al Sabah
7	R19	(United Kingdom) Donington Park (Grand Prix Circuit, Leicestershire)	22 August	(United Kingdom) Tommy Harfield	(Kuwait) Jaber Al Sabah	(Kuwait) Jaber Al Sabah	(United Arab Emirates) Xcel Motorsport	(Kuwait) Jaber Al Sabah
7	R20	(United Kingdom) Donington Park (Grand Prix Circuit, Leicestershire)	23 August		(Sweden) Scott Kin Lindblom	(Sweden) Scott Kin Lindblom	(United Kingdom) Hitech	(United Kingdom) Lewis Wherrell
7	R21	(United Kingdom) Donington Park (Grand Prix Circuit, Leicestershire)	23 August	(United Kingdom) Tommy Harfield	(United Kingdom) Haarni Sadiq (Note: Haarni Sadiq set the fastest lap but was not classified, so he was ineligible to score the point for it. No bonus point was awarded.)	(Australia) George Proudford-Nalder	(United Kingdom) Virtuosi Racing	(United Kingdom) Lewis Wherrell
8	R22	(United Kingdom) Croft Circuit (North Yorkshire)	5 September	(Belgium) Dries Van Langendonck	(Belgium) Dries Van Langendonck	(Belgium) Dries Van Langendonck	(New Zealand) Rodin Motorsport	(Belgium) Dries Van Langendonck
8	R23	(United Kingdom) Croft Circuit (North Yorkshire)	6 September		(Sweden) Scott Kin Lindblom	(Australia) George Proudford-Nalder	(United Kingdom) Virtuosi Racing	(Kuwait) Jaber Al Sabah
8	R24	(United Kingdom) Croft Circuit (North Yorkshire)	6 September	(Belgium) Dries Van Langendonck	(Belgium) Dries Van Langendonck	(Belgium) Dries Van Langendonck	(New Zealand) Rodin Motorsport	(Belgium) Dries Van Langendonck
9	R25	(United Kingdom) Silverstone Circuit (National Circuit, Northamptonshire)	26 September	(Belgium) Dries Van Langendonck	(Belgium) Dries Van Langendonck	(Belgium) Dries Van Langendonck	(New Zealand) Rodin Motorsport	(Belgium) Dries Van Langendonck
9	R26	(United Kingdom) Silverstone Circuit (National Circuit, Northamptonshire)	27 September		(United Kingdom) Haarni Sadiq	(United Kingdom) Tommy Harfield	(United Kingdom) Chris Dittmann Racing	(Belgium) Dries Van Langendonck
9	R27	(United Kingdom) Silverstone Circuit (National Circuit, Northamptonshire)	27 September	(Belgium) Dries Van Langendonck	(Belgium) Dries Van Langendonck	(Belgium) Dries Van Langendonck	(New Zealand) Rodin Motorsport	(Belgium) Dries Van Langendonck
10	R28	(United Kingdom) Brands Hatch (Grand Prix Circuit, Kent)	10 October	(United Arab Emirates) Theo Palmer	(United Arab Emirates) Theo Palmer	(United Arab Emirates) Theo Palmer	(United Kingdom) Hitech	(Belgium) Dries Van Langendonck
10	R29	(United Kingdom) Brands Hatch (Grand Prix Circuit, Kent)	11 October		(United Kingdom) Joseph Smith	(United Kingdom) Joseph Smith	(United Kingdom) Virtuosi Racing	(Kuwait) Jaber Al Sabah
10	R30	(United Kingdom) Brands Hatch (Grand Prix Circuit, Kent)	11 October	(United Arab Emirates) Theo Palmer	(United Arab Emirates) Theo Palmer	(United Arab Emirates) Theo Palmer	(United Kingdom) Hitech	(United Kingdom) Lewis Wherrell

== Championship standings ==
Points are awarded to the top ten classified finishers in races 1 and 3 and for the top eight classified finishers in race 2. Race 2, which has its grid formed by reversing the top twelve from the qualifying order, awards extra points, up until a maximum of ten, for positions gained from the drivers' respective starting positions. Two points are awarded for the fastest lap set in the qualifying session. Bonus points count towards only the drivers' standings.

Races	Position										Bonus	
Races	1st	2nd	3rd	4th	5th	6th	7th	8th	9th	10th	Pole	FL
Race 1	25	18	15	12	10	8	6	4	2	1	**0**	1
Race 2	10	8	6	5	4	3	2	1			**0**	1
Race 3	25	18	15	12	10	8	6	4	2	1	**2**	1

=== Drivers' Championship ===
Pos	Driver	DPN (United Kingdom)			BHI (United Kingdom)			SNE (United Kingdom)			SILGP (United Kingdom)			ZAN (Netherlands)			THR (United Kingdom)			DPGP (United Kingdom)			CRO (United Kingdom)			SILN (United Kingdom)			BHGP (United Kingdom)			Pen	Pts
Pos	Driver	R1	R2	R3	R4	R5	R6	R7	R8	R9	R10	R11	R12	R13	R14	R15	R16	R17	R18	R19	R20	R21	R22	R23	R24	R25	R26	R27	R28	R29	R30	Pen	Pts
1	(Belgium) Dries Van Langendonck	**1**	4^{8}	**4**	7	7	1	3	3^{4}	7	16	Ret	5	**1**	9^{3}	**1**	Ret	NC	3				**1**	6^{6}	**1**	**1**	6^{6}	**1**	2	11	7	3	344
2	(United Arab Emirates) Theo Palmer	3	5^{6}	Ret	4	9	23	6	19	5	5	8^{3}	3	2	6^{3}	3	**1**	14	6	6	6^{1}	4	5	5^{2}	5	2	4^{6}	3	**1**	10^{2}	**1**		295.5
3	(United Kingdom) Lewis Wherrell	30	2^{2}	15	5	6^{4}	Ret	**1**	7^{5}	**1**	1	10	2	12	21	17	7	21	2	5	2^{4}	3	3	9^{1}	2	Ret	7^{4}	2	13	4^{2}	4		267
4	(Australia) George Proudford-Nalder	8	10	14	10	13^{8}	27	5	4	6	**20**	6^{6}	**1**	22	2^{4}	5	3	Ret	21	4	7^{4}	1	10	1^{1}	Ret	12	13^{3}	23	3	6^{4}	2		199.5
5	(United Kingdom) Ethan Jeff-Hall	2	9	2	1	10	13	8	5^{1}	8	6	12	4	4	12	9	10	3^{6}	4	3	10	Ret	2	4^{2}	6								181.5
6	(South Africa) Ethan Lennon	29	1	6	9	12	16	7	8^{2}	3	13	9^{7}	Ret	18	1^{1}	6	4	5^{2}	Ret	7	8	2	7	8	3	Ret	5^{4}	4	6	28	3		173
7	(Sweden) Scott Kin Lindblom	6	3^{2}	3	8	11^{7}	14	2	6^{2}	4	10	16^{5}	22	3	5^{6}	2	6	Ret	Ret	12	1^{1}	6	8	2^{1}	22				7	24	5	30	151
8	(United Arab Emirates) Adam Al Azhari	9	Ret	9	**2**	21	**8**	9	9^{2}	2	2	7^{1}	6	27	10^{7}	11	Ret	1	10	14	14^{6}	12	6	21	Ret	Ret	11	6	4	5	8	9	131
9	(United Kingdom) Tommy Harfield	11	11^{10}	Ret	3	4^{4}	5	Ret	26	10	11	Ret	12	5	8	8	8	2	5	**2**	11^{1}	**Ret**	11	7	7	7	1	8	18	17	13		131
10	(United Kingdom) Jarrett Clark	5	8^{2}	22	6	1	17	10	15	9	3	5^{1}	Ret	7	7^{6}	Ret	5	12	22	10	3^{1}	5	13	12^{6}	12	4	2^{1}	7	5	2^{1}	9	18	128
11	(Kuwait) Jaber Al Sabah	18	24	7	14	3	18	11	11^{5}	20	17	11^{4}	27	10	23	7	9	4^{8}	**1**	1	Ret	Ret	15	3	8	Ret	17	Ret	8	3	20		115
12	(United Kingdom) Joseph Smith	4	22	1	Ret	8	10	4	23	Ret	Ret	1^{3}	Ret	14	19	27	2	15	7				14	10^{6}	11	3	12	5	11	1^{1}	30	12	111.5
13	(Switzerland) Chiara Bättig	14	18^{4}	13	17	20^{10}	6	17	14^{5}	14	9	3	19	16	15^{5}	14	13	8^{6}	9	17	13	10	4	18	4	5	3^{1}	Ret	10	8	6		102
14	(United Kingdom) Cameron Nelson	21	13^{10}	Ret	13	15^{1}	15	12	12^{1}	11	7	18	23	13	4^{3}	4	11	6^{7}	8	8	5	7	9	14	25	21	15^{4}	Ret	23	12^{6}	21	6	72
15	(United Kingdom) Kit Belofsky	26	12^{8}	16	Ret	16^{8}	2	24	18^{9}	Ret	30	13	7	15	Ret	22	16	11^{9}	Ret														58
16	(South Africa) Cole Hewetson	23	7^{6}	8	12	Ret	3	16	10^{5}	Ret	18	22	11	26	24^{3}	19	12	Ret	DNS	9	9^{7}	Ret	18	13^{2}	9	8	9^{9}	12	9	9^{4}	10	12	56
17	(United States) Ethan Carney	10	6	10	11	17	4	14	16^{2}	15	12	2	9	6	18	10	14	22^{1}	11	19	12^{2}	Ret	Ret	15^{2}	13	26	22^{4}	17	20	15^{6}	12		53
18	(United States) Jackson Wolny	22	17^{9}	23	18	18^{7}	21	23	27	22	22	24^{6}	21	28	17^{10}	23	24	19^{5}	13	27	19	19	22	22^{2}	15	17	19^{4}	19	Ret	20^{9}	23	3	49
19	(China) Sun Anzhe	24	Ret	24	23	22^{7}	11	25	25^{3}	24	28	25^{7}	25	Ret	22^{10}	24	Ret	17^{10}	20	28	Ret	Ret	26	25^{3}	24	25	29	20	29	24^{4}	25		44
20	(United States) Cash Felber	7	19	20	Ret	2	25	18	2	17	8	14^{3}	10	8	11^{4}	16	18	24	15	18	16	11	16	20	10	18	30	Ret	14	25	11		39
21	(United States) Henry Mercier	16	14^{7}	18	Ret	25^{1}	26	Ret	13^{4}	13	24	17^{7}	15	DNS	25	20	22	13^{2}	18	13	4	9	19	24	17	13	16^{8}	15					36
22	(United Kingdom) Daniella Sutton	25	23^{7}	25	Ret	28	20	27	24^{6}	25	29	Ret	24	30	26^{5}	Ret	24	20^{9}	Ret	29	25^{2}	20	24	28	21	16	24^{3}	24	27	23^{4}	27		36
23	(United Kingdom) Alfie Slater	15	Ret	12	15	24	22	19	20^{4}	18	19	Ret	16	24	Ret	Ret	19	10^{10}	14	20	17^{8}	14	17	17^{6}	14	10	18^{2}	16	16	7	28		34
24	(United Kingdom) Ella Lloyd	13	25	5							25	15^{10}	Ret	23	16^{10}	26																	30
25	(United Kingdom) Timo Jüngling	27	Ret	11	16	5^{1}	24	13	1	Ret	4	4	8	17	14^{10}	13	Ret	9^{10}	Ret	23	22^{2}	Ret				20	23	DNS				30	28
26	(Sweden) Leon Hedfors	17	16^{10}	26	20	19^{8}	Ret	21	21^{1}	16	14	23	14	20	20^{5}	21	15	18	12	21	27	15	20	19^{2}	20	24	28	18	21	27	17		26
27	(Norway) Vegard Klemetsen	Ret	Ret	Ret	22	27	7	26	17^{4}	19	21	20^{9}	18																				19
28	(United States) Roman Felber	12	20^{3}	19	24	Ret	12	15	28	12	27	Ret	Ret	9	Ret	18	17	7^{10}	Ret	24	15	8	21	16^{6}	16	22	14^{1}	13	12	Ret	DNS	12	16
29	(Poland) Piotr Orzechowski	19	21^{7}	21				22	Ret	23							21	23	19	26	24	18	25	23^{3}	23	11	25	Ret	22	14^{5}	15		15
30	(Canada) Justin Di Lucia																			22	23^{5}	16	27	27	18	19	26^{5}	22	31	19^{6}	29	3	13
31	(Austria) Emma Felbermayr										26	Ret	20	25	13^{10}	Ret																	10
32	(Denmark) Alba Hurup Larsen										15	21^{2}	26	29	3^{1}	15																	9
33	(Georgia (country)) Mate Kobakhidze	20	15^{4}	17	21	14^{1}	9	Ret	22^{4}	21	Ret	19^{3}	17	19	Ret	12	20	Ret	16	11	21	17	12	11^{3}	Ret	14	21	10	17	30	14	9	9
34	(United Kingdom) Jesse Phillips																												15	13^{7}	16		7
35	(United States) Alexander Vanchev																												25	21^{7}	18		7
36	(Australia) James Anagnostiadis																												19	18^{6}	22		6
37	(United Kingdom) Haarni Sadiq	28	Ret	Ret	19	23	Ret	20	29	Ret	23	Ret	13	21	DNS	Ret	Ret	16^{10}	17	16	26	Ret	23	26	19	6	10	25	30	16^{7}	24	21	5
38	(Germany) Arjen Kräling																									9	8	9					5
39	(Singapore) Michael Koh																												28	26^{5}	19		5
40	(United Kingdom) Fred Green																			25	18^{4}	13											4
41	(Republic of Ireland) Alex O'Grady																			15	20^{3}	Ret											3
42	(Canada) Autumn Fisher				25	26^{2}	19																										2
43	(Indonesia) Qarrar Firhand																Ret	DNS	DNS							27	31	21	26	29^{1}	26		1
44	(United States) Charlie Smith																									15	20	11	24	Ret	DNS		0
45	(Bulgaria) Lyuboslav Ruykov													11	27	25																	0
46	(United Kingdom) Archie Owen																									23	27	14					0
Pos	Driver	DPN (United Kingdom)			BHI (United Kingdom)			SNE (United Kingdom)			SILGP (United Kingdom)			ZAN (Netherlands)			THR (United Kingdom)			DPGP (United Kingdom)			CRO (United Kingdom)			SILN (United Kingdom)			BHGP (United Kingdom)			Pen	Pts

Colour	Result
Gold	Winner
Silver	Second place
Bronze	Third place
Green	Points classification
Blue	Non-points classification
Blue	Non-classified finish (NC)
Purple	Retired, not classified (Ret)
Red	Did not qualify (DNQ)
Red	Did not pre-qualify (DNPQ)
Black	Disqualified (DSQ)
White	Did not start (DNS)
White	Withdrew (WD)
White	Race cancelled (C)
Blank	Did not practice (DNP)
Blank	Did not arrive (DNA)
Blank	Excluded (EX)

**Bold** – Pole
Italics – Fastest Lap
^{x} – Positions Gained

=== Rookie Cup ===
Pos	Driver	DPN (United Kingdom)			BHI (United Kingdom)			SNE (United Kingdom)			SILGP (United Kingdom)			ZAN (Netherlands)			THR (United Kingdom)			DPGP (United Kingdom)			CRO (United Kingdom)			SILN (United Kingdom)			BHGP (United Kingdom)			Pen	Pts
Pos	Driver	R1	R2	R3	R4	R5	R6	R7	R8	R9	R10	R11	R12	R13	R14	R15	R16	R17	R18	R19	R20	R21	R22	R23	R24	R25	R26	R27	R28	R29	R30	Pen	Pts
1	(Belgium) Dries Van Langendonck	**1**	2	**1**	2	4	1	2	2	2	5	Ret	2	**1**	2	**1**	Ret	Ret	3				**1**	2	**1**	**1**	1	**1**	1	3	2	3	415
2	(United Kingdom) Lewis Wherrell	11	1	4	1	3	Ret	**1**	3	**1**	1	2	1	4	6	6	1	8	2	2	1	1	2	3	2	Ret	2	2	3	2	1		390.5
3	(Kuwait) Jaber Al Sabah	3	8	2	4	1	6	3	4	6	6	3	11	2	8	3	**2**	4	**1**	1	Ret	Ret	5	1	3	Ret	5	Ret	2	1	9		278
4	(United Kingdom) Cameron Nelson	6	3	Ret	3	6	5	4	5	3	3	4	9	5	1	2	3	2	4	2	2	2	3	5	9	7	4	Ret	9	4	10		233.5
5	(Georgia (country)) Mate Kobakhidze	5	4	5	9	5	3	Ret	8	7	Ret	5	6	7	Ret	4	5	Ret	7	4	3	6	4	4	Ret	4	7	3	5	15	3	9	184
6	(Sweden) Leon Hedfors	2	5	9	8	8	Ret	7	7	4	4	7	5	8	5	7	4	6	5	6	8	3	6	6	6	9	11	5	7	13	6		172
7	(United States) Jackson Wolny	7	6	7	6	7	8	9	10	8	8	8	8	10	4	8	7	7	6	8	4	5	7	7	4	5	6	6	Ret	9	12	3	117
8	(United Kingdom) Timo Jüngling	9	Ret	3	5	2	9	5	1	Ret	2	1	3	6	3	5	Ret	3	Ret	6	5	Ret				6	8	DNS				30	116
9	(Poland) Piotr Orzechowski	4	7	6				8	Ret	9							6	9	9	8	6	4	9	8	7	3	9	Ret	8	6	4		94
10	(United Kingdom) Haarni Sadiq	10	Ret	Ret	7	10	Ret	6	11	Ret	9	Ret	4	9	DNS	Ret	Ret	4	8	4	7	Ret	8	10	5	2	3	9	15	7	13	21	72
11	(Norway) Vegard Klemetsen	Ret	Ret	Ret	10	12	2	11	6	5	7	6	7																				47
12	(China) Sun Anzhe	8	Ret	8	11	9	4	10	9	10	10	9	10	Ret	7	9	Ret	5	10	10	Ret	Ret	10	9	8	10	12	7	14	11	14		43
13	(United Kingdom) Jesse Phillips																												4	5	5		26
14	(United States) Charlie Smith																												10	Ret	DNS		25
15	(Bulgaria) Lyuboslav Ruykov													3	9	10																	16
16	(United Kingdom) Archie Owen																									8	10	4					12
17	(Australia) James Anagnostiadis																												6	8	11		9
18	(United States) Alexander Vanchev																												11	10	7		6
19	(Canada) Autumn Fisher				12	11	7																										6
20	(Singapore) Michael Koh																												13	12	8		4
21	(Indonesia) Qarrar Firhand																									11	13	8	12	14	15		2
Pos	Driver	DPN (United Kingdom)			BHI (United Kingdom)			SNE (United Kingdom)			SILGP (United Kingdom)			ZAN (Netherlands)			THR (United Kingdom)			DPGP (United Kingdom)			CRO (United Kingdom)			SILN (United Kingdom)			BHGP (United Kingdom)			Pen	Pts

=== Teams' Cup ===
Pos	Team	DPN (United Kingdom)			BHI (United Kingdom)			SNE (United Kingdom)			SILGP (United Kingdom)			ZAN (Netherlands)			THR (United Kingdom)			DPGP (United Kingdom)			CRO (United Kingdom)			SILN (United Kingdom)			BHGP (United Kingdom)			Pts
Pos	Team	R1	R2	R3	R4	R5	R6	R7	R8	R9	R10	R11	R12	R13	R14	R15	R16	R17	R18	R19	R20	R21	R22	R23	R24	R25	R26	R27	R28	R29	R30	Pts
1	(United Kingdom) Hitech	3	3	3	2	9	6	2	6	2	2	3	3	2	5	2	1	1	6	6	1	4	4	2	4	2	3	3	1	5	1	601.5
1	(United Kingdom) Hitech	6	5	9	4	11	8	6	9	4	5	7	6	3	6	3	6	8	9	12	6	6	5	5	5	5	4	6	4	8	5	601.5
1	(United Kingdom) Hitech	9	18	13	8	20	14	9	14	5	9	8	19	16	10	11	13	14	10	14	13	10	6	18	22	23	11	14	7	10	6	601.5
2	(New Zealand) Rodin Motorsport	1	1	4	7	7	1	3	3	3	13	9	5	1	1	1	4	5	3	7	8	2	1	6	1	1	5	1	2	5	3	476
2	(New Zealand) Rodin Motorsport	13	4	5	9	12	16	7	8	7	16	15	16	18	9	6	19	10	14	15	17	14	7	8	3	10	6	4	6	11	7	476
2	(New Zealand) Rodin Motorsport	15	25	6	15	24	22	19	20	18	19	Ret	Ret	23	16	26	Ret	NC	Ret	20	20	Ret	17	17	14	Ret	18	16	15	13	16	476
3	(United Kingdom) Virtuosi Racing	4	8	1	6	1	10	4	4	6	3	1	1	7	2	5	2	12	7	4	3	1	10	1	11	3	2	5	3	1	2	409.5
3	(United Kingdom) Virtuosi Racing	5	10	14	10	8	17	5	15	9	20	5	20	14	7	27	3	15	21	10	7	5	13	10	12	4	12	7	5	2	9	409.5
3	(United Kingdom) Virtuosi Racing	8	22	22	Ret	13	27	10	23	Ret	26	6	Ret	22	13	Ret	5	Ret	22	25	18	13	14	12	Ret	12	13	11	11	6	30	409.5
4	(United Kingdom) JHR Developments	21	2	11	5	5	15	1	1	1	1	4	2	12	4	4	7	6	2	5	2	3	3	9	2	6	7	2	13	4	4	331
4	(United Kingdom) JHR Developments	27	13	15	13	6	24	12	7	11	4	10	8	13	14	13	11	9	8	8	5	7	9	14	19	20	12	25	23	12	19	331
4	(United Kingdom) JHR Developments	28	Ret	Ret	16	15	Ret	13	12	Ret	7	18	13	17	21	17	Ret	16	17	16	22	Ret	23	26	25	21	15	Ret	28	16	21	331
5	(United Kingdom) Argenti Motorsport	2	9	2	1	10	7	8	5	8	6	12	4	4	12	9	10	3	4	3	10	15	2	4	6	9	8	9	19	18	17	182.5
5	(United Kingdom) Argenti Motorsport	17	16	24	20	19	11	21	17	16	14	20	14	11	20	21	15	17	12	21	23	16	20	19	18	19	26	18	21	19	22	182.5
5	(United Kingdom) Argenti Motorsport	24	Ret	24	22	22	13	25	21	19	21	23	18	20	22	24	Ret	18	20	22	27	Ret	26	25	20	24	28	20	29	22	25	182.5
6	(United Arab Emirates) Xcel Motorsport	18	7	7	12	3	3	11	10	20	17	11	11	10	17	7	9	4	1	1	9	17	12	3	8	8	9	10	8	3	10	131
6	(United Arab Emirates) Xcel Motorsport	20	15	8	14	14	9	16	11	21	18	19	17	19	23	12	12	19	13	9	19	19	15	11	9	14	17	19	9	9	14	131
6	(United Arab Emirates) Xcel Motorsport	22	17	17	18	18	18	23	22	22	22	22	21	26	24	19	20	Ret	16	11	21	Ret	18	13	15	17	19	19	17	20	20	131
7	(United Kingdom) Chris Dittmann Racing	11	11	18	3	4	5	22	13	10	11	17	12	5	3	8	8	2	5	2	4	9	11	7	7	7	1	8	18	14	13	127
7	(United Kingdom) Chris Dittmann Racing	16	14	21	25	25	19	27	24	13	15	21	15	29	8	15	21	13	18	13	11	18	19	23	17	11	16	15	22	17	15	127
7	(United Kingdom) Chris Dittmann Racing	19	21	25	Ret	26	20	Ret	26	23	24	Ret	24	30	25	20	22	20	19	26	24	20	24	24	21	13	24	24	25	21	18	127
8	(United Kingdom) Fortec Motorsport	7	6	10	11	2	2	14	2	12	8	2	7	6	11	10	14	7	11	18	12	8	16	15	10	18	14	13	12	15	11	101
8	(United Kingdom) Fortec Motorsport	10	12	16	24	16	4	15	16	15	12	13	9	8	18	16	16	11	15	19	15	11	21	16	13	22	22	17	14	25	12	101
8	(United Kingdom) Fortec Motorsport	12	19	19	Ret	17	12	18	18	17	27	14	10	9	Ret	18	17	22	Ret	24	16	Ret	Ret	20	16	26	30	21	20	29	26	101
Pos	Team	DPN (United Kingdom)			BHI (United Kingdom)			SNE (United Kingdom)			SILGP (United Kingdom)			ZAN (Netherlands)			THR (United Kingdom)			DPGP (United Kingdom)			CRO (United Kingdom)			SILN (United Kingdom)			BHGP (United Kingdom)			Pts
