= Emma Felbermayr =

Austrian racing driver (born 2007)

- Felbermayr at the 2026 Dutch Grand Prix
- Nationality: (Austria) Austrian
- Born: 27 January 2007 (age 19) Wels, Upper Austria, Austria
- Relatives: Horst Felbermayr (grandfather); Horst Felbermayr Jr. (father); Horst Felix Felbermayr (brother)

F1 Academy career
- Debut season: 2025
- Current team: Rodin Motorsport
- Car number: 5
- Starts: 26
- Wins: 3
- Podiums: 6
- Poles: 0
- Fastest laps: 0
- Best finish: 10th in 2025

Previous series
- 2025; 2025: F4 Spanish; Eurocup-4 Spanish Winter

Championship titles
- 2026: Italian F4 – Women's Trophy
- Statistics up to date as of 13 November 2026.

Emma Felbermayr (born 27 January 2007) is an Austrian racing driver who competes in F1 Academy for Rodin Motorsport and the Italian F4 Championship for PHM Racing as part of the Audi Driver Development Programme.

== Junior career ==
=== Karting ===
Felbermayr made her international karting debut in 2019, racing for Solgat Motorsport in the OKJ class of the Trofeo Delle Industrie. Continuing in OKJ until 2021, Felbermayr finished eighth in both the ADAC Kart Masters and second in the Ladies Cup in her final year in the category. Stepping up to OK for the following year, Felbermayr's main highlights were a ninth place in the 2022 German Karting Championship and a ninth-place finish in the South Garda Winter Cup in 2023 before stepping up to KZ2 that same year. After competing in the Karting World Cup and WSK Final Cups, Felbermayr stayed in KZ2 for 2024, during which she finished 31st in the Andrea Margutti Trophy.

=== Formula 4 ===
==== 2025 ====
On the same day as her F1 Academy announcement, Rodin Motorsport announced that Felbermayr would also compete in the 2025 Spanish F4 Championship and Eurocup-4 Winter Championships. In the first round of the Eurocup-4 Winter Championship, Felbermayr finished 28th and 20th in the first two races, but after starting 24th for race three, she took advantage of crashes ahead and post-race penalties to be classified 13th in the final race of the weekend. She was unable to better this result in the following round, and finished the championship in 27th overall, the highest placed female driver. In the main Spanish F4 campaign, Felbermayr's season began slowly with a best result of 22nd in MotorLand Aragón, but steady progression during the third round in Portimão saw her finish 15th in race three. In the following four rounds, Felbermayr scored a best result of 13th in race one at Barcelona to end her maiden season in F4 machinery 29th in points.

==== 2026 ====
At the start of the following year, Felbermayr joined PHM Racing to compete in the first three rounds of the UAE4 Series, scoring a best result of 12th in race three of the second Yas Marina round. Continuing with PHM to compete in Italian F4, Felbermayr took a best overall result of 14th at Monza and the first Mugello round to end the year 43rd in points as the Women's Trophy champion.

=== F1 Academy ===
==== 2025 ====
On December 17, 2024, Sauber announced that Felbermayr would be representing the team in the 2025 season of F1 Academy, joining Rodin Motorsport alongside Ella Lloyd and Chloe Chong.

Felbermayr qualified seventh on debut in Shanghai, but finished 11th after colliding with Tina Hausmann on the final lap after starting second in the reverse-grid race. In the second race of the weekend, Felbermayr finished fifth to score her maiden points of the year, but was left "expecting more" after having done well in pre-event tests. In Round 2 at Jeddah, Felbermayr finished ninth in the sprint race despite starting on reverse grid pole, whilst in the feature race, Felbermayr ran eighth in the opening stages but contact with Rafaela Ferreira sent her out of the points and she was only able to muster a 15th-place finish. After a disappointing Miami round where she finished 15th in the sprint race after taking reverse-grid pole and Race 2 was cancelled due to adverse weather, Felbermayr took her first podium in the opening race in Montreal, but was later disqualified because her car was underweight. However, she went on to take her maiden single-seater win in the following race after overtaking Nina Gademan on the final lap, and capped off the weekend by finishing tenth in Race 3. Felbermayr then scored points three more times in the following three rounds, finishing as high as fourth in Singapore, to end the year tenth in points.

==== 2026 ====
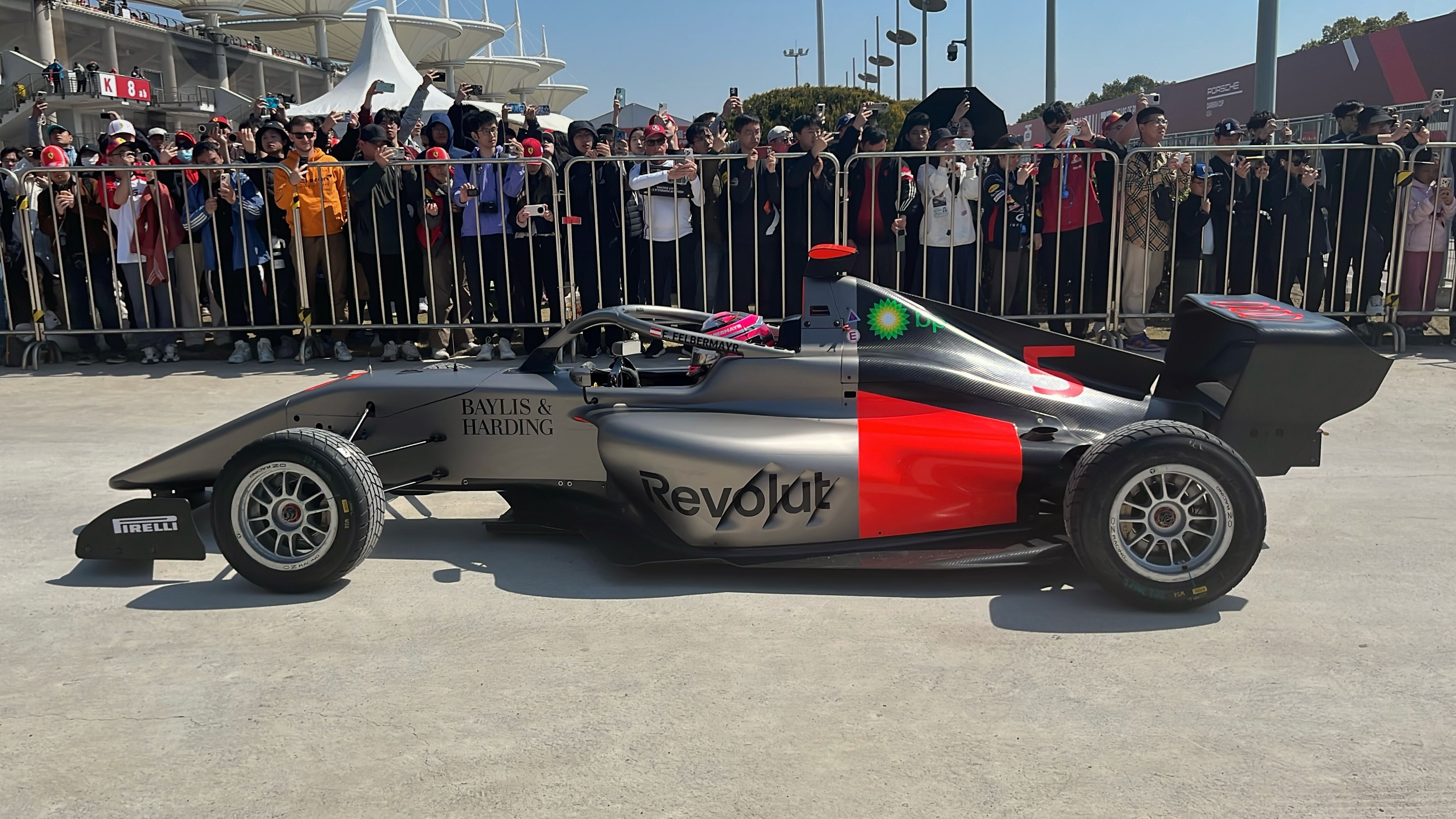
Felbermayr at the 2026 F1 Academy Shanghai round

Felbermayr returned for the 2026 season with Rodin Motorsport, alongside teammates Ella Lloyd and Ella Stevens, representing Audi. She also joined the Audi Driver Development Programme. In the season-opening Shanghai round, Felbermayr finished third in the sprint race, before winning the feature race to take the points lead.

==== 2027 ====
Felbermayr will continue to drive for Rodin Motorsport for a third F1 Academy campaign in 2027, still set to be represented by Audi.

== Personal life ==
Felbermayr's family owns the Felbermayr construction and transport company, and is steeped in motorsport heritage. Her late grandfather Horst and father Horst Jr. have entered the 24 Hours of Le Mans multiple times, while her older brother Horst Felix currently competes in the European Le Mans Series. She is a fan of former Formula One driver Sebastian Vettel.

Felbermayr is in a relationship with 2018 European Karting Champion Hannes Janker, ten years her senior.

== Karting record ==
=== Karting career summary ===
Season	Series	Team	Position
2019	48° Trofeo delle Industrie — OKJ	Solgat Motorsport	NC
2020	ADAC Kart Masters — OKJ	Solgat Motorsport	NC
2020	CIK-FIA European Championship — OKJ	Solgat Motorsport	48th
2021	Champions of the Future — OKJ	Solgat Motorsport	92nd
2021	ADAC Kart Masters — OKJ	Solgat Motorsport	8th
2021	Deutsche Kart Meisterschaft — OKJ	Solgat Motorsport	19th
2021	CIK-FIA European Championship — OKJ	Solgat Motorsport	NC
2021	WSK Open Cup — OKJ	Solgat Motorsport	81st
2021	26° South Garda Winter Cup — OKJ	TB Racing Team	16th
2022	WSK Super Master Series — OK	TB Racing Team	53rd
2022	Deutsche Kart Meisterschaft — OK	TB Racing Team	9th
2022	WSK Euro Series — OK	TB Racing Team	66th
2022	Karting World Championship — OK	TB Racing Team	83rd
2022	WSK Final Cup — OK	TB Racing Team	36th
2023	28° South Garda Winter Cup — OK	TB Racing Team	9th
2023	WSK Champions Cup — OK	TB Racing Team	19th
2023	WSK Super Master Series — OK	TB Racing Team	63rd
2023	FIA Karting World Cup — KZ2	TB Racing Team	50th
2023	WSK Final Cup — KZ2	TB Racing Team	35th
2024	WSK Super Master Series — KZ2	TB Racing Team	79th
2024	Andrea Margutti Trophy — KZ2	TB Racing Team	31st
2024	CIK-FIA European Championship — KZ2	TB Racing Team	40th
2024	Champions of the Future — KZ2	TB Racing Team	65th
2024	FIA Karting World Cup — KZ2	TB Racing Team	51st

== Racing record ==
=== Racing career summary ===
Season	Series	Team	Races	Wins	Poles	F/Laps	Podiums	Points	Position
2025	Eurocup-4 Spanish Winter Championship	Rodin Motorsport	6	0	0	0	0	0	27th
2025	F1 Academy	Rodin Motorsport	14	1	0	0	1	37	10th
2025	F4 Spanish Championship	Rodin Motorsport	18	0	0	0	0	0	29th
2025	F4 British Championship	Virtuosi Racing	3	0	0	0	0	7	30th
2026	UAE4 Series	PHM Racing	9	0	0	0	0	0	26th
2026	Italian F4 Championship	PHM Racing	18	0	0	0	0	5	43rd
2026	F1 Academy	Rodin Motorsport	14	2	0	0	5	125	**3rd**
2026	F4 British Championship	Virtuosi Racing	6	0	0	0	0	10	31st
2027	F1 Academy	Rodin Motorsport	0	0	0	0	0	0	TBD

* Season still in progress.

=== Complete Eurocup-4 Spanish Winter Championship results ===
(key) (Races in bold indicate pole position) (Races in italics indicate fastest lap)

Year	Team	1	2	3	4	5	6	7	8	9	DC	Points
2025	Rodin Motorsport	JER; 1; 28	JER; 2; 20	JER; 3; 13	POR; 1; 20	POR; 2; 21	POR; 3; 31	NAV; 1	NAV; 2	NAV; 3	27th	0

=== Complete F1 Academy results ===
(key) (Races in bold indicate pole position; races in italics indicate fastest lap)

Year	Entrant	1	2	3	4	5	6	7	8	9	10	11	12	13	14	15	DC	Points
2025	Rodin Motorsport	SHA; 1; 11	SHA; 2; 5	JED; 1; 9	JED; 2; 15	MIA; 1; 15	MIA; 2 C	MTL; 1 DSQ	MTL; 2; 1	MTL; 3; 10	ZAN; 1; 8	ZAN; 2; 15	SIN; 1; 6	SIN; 2; 4	LVG; 1; 9	LVG; 2; 12	10th	37
2026	Rodin Motorsport	SHA; 1; 3	SHA; 2; 1	MTL; 1; 10	MTL; 2; 6	MTL; 3; 2	SIL; 1; 1	SIL; 2; 3	ZAN; 1; 13	ZAN; 2; 5	COA; 1; 5	COA; 2; 4	COA; 3; 5	LVG; 1	LVG; 2		2nd*	53*

* Season still in progress.

=== Complete F4 Spanish Championship results ===
(key) (Races in bold indicate pole position; races in italics indicate fastest lap)

Year	Team	1	2	3	4	5	6	7	8	9	10	11	12	13	14	15	16	17	18	19	20	21	DC	Points
2025	Rodin Motorsport	ARA; 1; 25	ARA; 2; 31	ARA; 3; 22	NAV; 1	NAV; 2	NAV; 3	POR; 1; 21	POR; 2; 18	POR; 3; 15	LEC; 1; 20	LEC; 2; 26	LEC; 3; 19	JER; 1; 23	JER; 2; 31	JER; 3; 17	CRT; 1; 20	CRT; 2 Ret	CRT; 3; 19	CAT; 1; 13	CAT; 2 Ret	CAT; 3; 30	29th	0

=== Complete F4 British Championship results ===
(key) (Races in bold indicate pole position) (Races in italics indicate fastest lap)

Year	Team	1	2	3	4	5	6	7	8	9	10	11	12	13	14	15	16	17	18	19	20	21	22	23	24	25	26	27	28	29	30	31	32	DC	Points
2025	Virtuosi Racing	DPN; 1	DPN; 2	DPN; 3	SILGP; 1	SILGP; 2	SILGP; 3	SNE; 1	SNE; 2	SNE; 3	THR; 1	THR; 2	THR; 3	OUL; 1	OUL; 2	OUL; 3	SILGP; 1	SILGP; 2	ZAN; 1; 18	ZAN; 2; 15^{7}	ZAN; 3; 17	KNO; 1	KNO; 2	KNO; 3	DPGP; 1	DPGP; 2	DPGP; 3	SILN; 1	SILN; 2	SILN; 3	BHGP; 1	BHGP; 2	BHGP; 3	30th	7
2026	Virtuosi Racing	DPN; 1	DPN; 2	DPN; 3	BHI; 1	BHI; 2	BHI; 3	SNE; 1	SNE; 2	SNE; 3	SILGP; 1; 26	SILGP; 2 Ret	SILGP; 3; 20	ZAN; 1; 25	ZAN; 2; 13^{10}	ZAN; 3 Ret	THR; 1	THR; 2	THR; 3	DPGP; 1	DPGP; 2	DPGP; 3	CRO; 1	CRO; 2	CRO; 3	SILN; 1	SILN; 2	SILN; 3	BHGP; 1	BHGP; 2	BHGP; 3			31st	10

=== Complete UAE4 Series results ===
(key) (Races in bold indicate pole position; races in italics indicate fastest lap)

Year	Team	1	2	3	4	5	6	7	8	9	10	11	12	DC	Points
2026	PHM Racing	YMC1; 1; 22	YMC1; 2; 24	YMC1; 3; 14	YMC2; 1; 15	YMC2; 2; 13	YMC2; 3; 12	DUB; 1 Ret	DUB; 2; 16	DUB; 3; 33	LUS; 1	LUS; 2	LUS; 3	26th	0

=== Complete Italian F4 Championship results ===
(key) (Races in bold indicate pole position; races in italics indicate fastest lap)

Year	Team	1	2	3	4	5	6	7	8	9	10	11	12	13	14	15	16	17	18	19	20	21	22	23	24	25	26	27	28	DC	Points
2026	PHM Racing	MIS1; 1; 22	MIS1; 2	MIS1; 3; 15	MIS1; 4 Ret	VLL; 1	VLL; 2	VLL; 3	VLL; 4	MNZ; 1	MNZ; 2; 17	MNZ; 3; 14	MNZ; 4; 24	MUG1; 1	MUG1; 2; 14	MUG1; 3; 21	MUG1; 4; 27	IMO; 1	IMO; 2; 18	IMO; 3; 23	IMO; 4; 19	MIS2; 1	MIS2; 2; 16	MIS2; 3; 21	MIS2; 4; 25	MUG2; 1; 18	MUG2; 2; 17	MUG2; 3	MUG2; 4; 19	43rd	5
