= 2025 F4 British Championship =

The 2025 Wera Tools F4 British Championship was a multi-event, Formula 4 open-wheel single seater motor racing championship held across United Kingdom. The championship featured a mix of professional motor racing teams and privately funded drivers, competing in Formula 4 cars that conform to the technical regulations for the championship. This, the eleventh season, following on from the British Formula Ford Championship, was the eleventh year that the cars conform to the FIA's Formula 4 regulations. Part of the TOCA tour, it formed part of the extensive program of support categories built up around the BTCC centrepiece.

The season commenced on 26 April at Donington Park, utilising the National circuit, and concluded on 5 October at Brands Hatch, utilising the Grand Prix circuit, after thirty races to be held at ten meetings, eight of them in the support of the 2025 British Touring Car Championship.

== Teams and drivers ==
Team	No.	Drivers	Class	Rounds
(United Kingdom) Hitech TGR	2	(United Kingdom) Joseph Smith	R C	7–10
(United Kingdom) Hitech TGR	3	(Netherlands) Nina Gademan	C	6, NC
(United Kingdom) Hitech TGR	4	(Australia) Xavier Avramides	R	All, NC
(United Kingdom) Hitech TGR	5	(Republic of Ireland) Fionn McLaughlin	R	All, NC
(United Kingdom) Hitech TGR	6	(Algeria) Leo Robinson		1–5, NC
(United Kingdom) Hitech TGR	7	(United Kingdom) Thomas Bearman	R	All, NC
(United Kingdom) Fortec Motorsport	8	(United Kingdom) Thomas Ingram Hill	C	4, 6, 8–9, NC
(United Kingdom) Fortec Motorsport	14	(United Kingdom) Emily Cotty		NC
(United Kingdom) Fortec Motorsport	26	(United Kingdom) Henry Joslyn		All, NC
(United Kingdom) Fortec Motorsport	46	(India) Ary Bansal	C	4–9, NC
(United Kingdom) Virtuosi Racing	11	(Austria) Emma Felbermayr	R	6
(United Kingdom) Virtuosi Racing	19	(Ukraine) Oleksandr Savinkov		6, 8–10, NC
(United Kingdom) Virtuosi Racing	24	(Hungary) Martin Molnár		All, NC
(United Kingdom) Virtuosi Racing	88	(Colombia) Salim Hanna	R C	4, NC
(New Zealand) Rodin Motorsport	12	(United Arab Emirates) Adam Al Azhari		All, NC
(New Zealand) Rodin Motorsport	15	(Belgium) Dries Van Langendonck	R	8–10
(New Zealand) Rodin Motorsport	17	(United Kingdom) Chloe Chong		3, 6
(New Zealand) Rodin Motorsport	17	(Israel) Guy Albag		NC
(New Zealand) Rodin Motorsport	44	(Israel) Guy Albag	R	7–8, 10
(New Zealand) Rodin Motorsport	20	(United Kingdom) Ella Lloyd	C	1, 3–7, 9, NC
(New Zealand) Rodin Motorsport	93	(Australia) James Piszcyk		All, NC
(United Kingdom) Phinsys by Argenti	13	(United States) Henry Mercier	R	All
(United Kingdom) Phinsys by Argenti	25	(United Kingdom) Ethan Jeff-Hall		All, NC
(United Kingdom) Phinsys by Argenti	47	(Sweden) August Raber		All, NC
(United Kingdom) Phinsys by Argenti	62	(Germany) Arjen Kräling	R C	6–10
(United Kingdom) Chris Dittmann Racing	14	(Denmark) Alba Larsen	R C	1, 3–7, 9
(United Kingdom) Chris Dittmann Racing	21	(United Kingdom) Tommy Harfield	C (Note: Eligible only in the rounds 1–7.)	All, NC
(United Kingdom) Chris Dittmann Racing	27	(United Kingdom) Charlie Edge	R C	1–4, 6, 8–9, NC
(United Kingdom) Chris Dittmann Racing	40	(Poland) Piotr Orzechowski	R	2, 8, 10
(United Kingdom) Chris Dittmann Racing	55	(United States) Ava Dobson		NC
(United Kingdom) JHR Developments	22	(Sweden) Joel Bergström		1–4
(United Kingdom) JHR Developments	32	(United Kingdom) Harri Reynolds	C	1
(United Kingdom) JHR Developments	42	(United Kingdom) Rowan Campbell-Pilling		All, NC
(United Kingdom) JHR Developments	43	(Pakistan) Haarni Sadiq	R C	7, 9–10
(United Kingdom) JHR Developments	52	(Netherlands) Esmee Kosterman		2–3, 6, NC
(United Arab Emirates) Xcel Motorsport	23	(United Arab Emirates) Theo Palmer	R	2–10, NC
(United Arab Emirates) Xcel Motorsport	33	(South Africa) Cole Hewetson	R	All
(United Arab Emirates) Xcel Motorsport	69	(China) Yuhao Fu		All, NC
(United Arab Emirates) Xcel Motorsport	83	(Kuwait) Jaber Al Sabah		NC
(United Arab Emirates) Xcel Motorsport	90	(United Kingdom) Chase Fernandez		All

Icon	Class
R	Rookie
C	Challenge Cup

== Race calendar ==
All but one round were held in the United Kingdom. Initially, as of 1 May 2024, all rounds were scheduled to support the British Touring Car Championship. The revision published on 8 October contained the replacement of the rounds at the Brands Hatch (the Indy Circuit layout) and the Croft Circuit by the Grand Prix layout at the Silverstone Circuit and the Circuit Zandvoort. An additional non-championship round at the Silverstone Circuit was held in the support of the 2025 British Grand Prix.

Round		Circuit	Date	Pole position	Fastest lap	Winning driver	Winning team	Rookie winner
1	R1	(United Kingdom) Donington Park (National Circuit, Leicestershire)	26 April	(United Kingdom) Henry Joslyn	(Republic of Ireland) Fionn McLaughlin	(Sweden) August Raber	(United Kingdom) Phinsys by Argenti	(Republic of Ireland) Fionn McLaughlin
1	R2	(United Kingdom) Donington Park (National Circuit, Leicestershire)	27 April		(Hungary) Martin Molnár	(United Kingdom) Chase Fernandez	(United Arab Emirates) Xcel Motorsport	(United Kingdom) Thomas Bearman
1	R3	(United Kingdom) Donington Park (National Circuit, Leicestershire)	27 April	(United Kingdom) Henry Joslyn	(Sweden) August Raber	(Sweden) August Raber	(United Kingdom) Phinsys by Argenti	(Republic of Ireland) Fionn McLaughlin
2	R4	(United Kingdom) Silverstone Circuit (Grand Prix Circuit, Northamptonshire)	2 May	(Australia) James Piszcyk	(Australia) James Piszcyk	(Australia) James Piszcyk	(New Zealand) Rodin Motorsport	(Republic of Ireland) Fionn McLaughlin
2	R5	(United Kingdom) Silverstone Circuit (Grand Prix Circuit, Northamptonshire)	3 May		(Sweden) August Raber	(United Arab Emirates) Adam Al Azhari	(New Zealand) Rodin Motorsport	(United Kingdom) Thomas Bearman
2	R6	(United Kingdom) Silverstone Circuit (Grand Prix Circuit, Northamptonshire)	3 May	(Australia) James Piszcyk	(Hungary) Martin Molnár	(Australia) James Piszcyk	(New Zealand) Rodin Motorsport	(Republic of Ireland) Fionn McLaughlin
3	R7	(United Kingdom) Snetterton Motor Racing Circuit (300 Circuit, Norfolk)	24 May	(Republic of Ireland) Fionn McLaughlin	(United Arab Emirates) Adam Al Azhari	(United Arab Emirates) Adam Al Azhari	(New Zealand) Rodin Motorsport	(United Arab Emirates) Theo Palmer
3	R8	(United Kingdom) Snetterton Motor Racing Circuit (300 Circuit, Norfolk)	25 May		(United Kingdom) Tommy Harfield	(Sweden) August Raber	(United Kingdom) Phinsys by Argenti	(Republic of Ireland) Fionn McLaughlin
3	R9	(United Kingdom) Snetterton Motor Racing Circuit (300 Circuit, Norfolk)	25 May	(Republic of Ireland) Fionn McLaughlin	(Republic of Ireland) Fionn McLaughlin	(Republic of Ireland) Fionn McLaughlin	(United Kingdom) Hitech TGR	(Republic of Ireland) Fionn McLaughlin
4	R10	(United Kingdom) Thruxton Circuit (Hampshire)	7 June	(United Kingdom) Henry Joslyn	(Hungary) Martin Molnár	(Hungary) Martin Molnár	(United Kingdom) Virtuosi Racing	(Republic of Ireland) Fionn McLaughlin
4	R11	(United Kingdom) Thruxton Circuit (Hampshire)	7 June		(Algeria) Leo Robinson	(Algeria) Leo Robinson	(United Kingdom) Hitech TGR	(United Kingdom) Thomas Bearman
4	R12	(United Kingdom) Thruxton Circuit (Hampshire)	8 June	(United Kingdom) Henry Joslyn	(Hungary) Martin Molnár	(Colombia) Salim Hanna	(United Kingdom) Virtuosi Racing	(Colombia) Salim Hanna
5	R13	(United Kingdom) Oulton Park (Island Circuit, Cheshire)	21 June	(Hungary) Martin Molnár	(Republic of Ireland) Fionn McLaughlin	(Republic of Ireland) Fionn McLaughlin	(United Kingdom) Hitech TGR	(Republic of Ireland) Fionn McLaughlin
5	R14	(United Kingdom) Oulton Park (Island Circuit, Cheshire)	22 June		(United Kingdom) Rowan Campbell-Pilling	(Australia) James Piszcyk	(New Zealand) Rodin Motorsport	(United States) Henry Mercier
5	R15	(United Kingdom) Oulton Park (Island Circuit, Cheshire)	22 June	(Hungary) Martin Molnár	(Republic of Ireland) Fionn McLaughlin	(United Kingdom) Thomas Bearman	(United Kingdom) Hitech TGR	(United Kingdom) Thomas Bearman
NC	R1	(United Kingdom) Silverstone Circuit (Grand Prix Circuit, Northamptonshire)	5 July	(Colombia) Salim Hanna	(Colombia) Salim Hanna	(Colombia) Salim Hanna	(United Kingdom) Virtuosi Racing	(Colombia) Salim Hanna
NC	R2	(United Kingdom) Silverstone Circuit (Grand Prix Circuit, Northamptonshire)	6 July	(Republic of Ireland) Fionn McLaughlin	(Colombia) Salim Hanna	(Colombia) Salim Hanna	(United Kingdom) Virtuosi Racing	(Colombia) Salim Hanna
6	R16	(Netherlands) Circuit Zandvoort (Zandvoort)	26 July	(United Kingdom) Henry Joslyn	(Hungary) Martin Molnár	(Hungary) Martin Molnár	(United Kingdom) Virtuosi Racing	(Republic of Ireland) Fionn McLaughlin
6	R17	(Netherlands) Circuit Zandvoort (Zandvoort)	27 July		(United Kingdom) Thomas Bearman	(India) Ary Bansal	(United Kingdom) Fortec Motorsport	(Republic of Ireland) Fionn McLaughlin
6	R18	(Netherlands) Circuit Zandvoort (Zandvoort)	27 July	(Republic of Ireland) Fionn McLaughlin	(Republic of Ireland) Fionn McLaughlin	(Republic of Ireland) Fionn McLaughlin	(United Kingdom) Hitech TGR	(Republic of Ireland) Fionn McLaughlin
7	R19	(United Kingdom) Knockhill Racing Circuit (Fife)	16 August	(United Kingdom) Rowan Campbell-Pilling	(Republic of Ireland) Fionn McLaughlin	(Republic of Ireland) Fionn McLaughlin	(United Kingdom) Hitech TGR	(Republic of Ireland) Fionn McLaughlin
7	R20	(United Kingdom) Knockhill Racing Circuit (Fife)	17 August		(United Kingdom) Tommy Harfield	(United Arab Emirates) Adam Al Azhari	(New Zealand) Rodin Motorsport	(United Arab Emirates) Theo Palmer
7	R21	(United Kingdom) Knockhill Racing Circuit (Fife)	17 August	(United Kingdom) Thomas Bearman	(Hungary) Martin Molnár	(United Kingdom) Rowan Campbell-Pilling	(United Kingdom) JHR Developments	(United Kingdom) Thomas Bearman
8	R22	(United Kingdom) Donington Park (Grand Prix Circuit, Leicestershire)	30 August	(United Kingdom) Tommy Harfield	(Republic of Ireland) Fionn McLaughlin	(United Kingdom) Tommy Harfield	(United Kingdom) Chris Dittmann Racing	(Republic of Ireland) Fionn McLaughlin
8	R23	(United Kingdom) Donington Park (Grand Prix Circuit, Leicestershire)	31 August		(United Arab Emirates) Adam Al Azhari	(Australia) James Piszcyk	(New Zealand) Rodin Motorsport	(United Kingdom) Thomas Bearman
8	R24	(United Kingdom) Donington Park (Grand Prix Circuit, Leicestershire)	31 August	(Belgium) Dries Van Langendonck	(United Kingdom) Henry Joslyn	(Belgium) Dries Van Langendonck	(New Zealand) Rodin Motorsport	(Belgium) Dries Van Langendonck
9	R25	(United Kingdom) Silverstone Circuit (National Circuit, Northamptonshire)	20 September	(United Kingdom) Tommy Harfield	(Republic of Ireland) Fionn McLaughlin	(Republic of Ireland) Fionn McLaughlin	(United Kingdom) Hitech TGR	(Republic of Ireland) Fionn McLaughlin
9	R26	(United Kingdom) Silverstone Circuit (National Circuit, Northamptonshire)	21 September		(Hungary) Martin Molnár	(United Kingdom) Ethan Jeff-Hall	(United Kingdom) Phinsys by Argenti	(United Kingdom) Joseph Smith
9	R27	(United Kingdom) Silverstone Circuit (National Circuit, Northamptonshire)	21 September	(Hungary) Martin Molnár	(United Kingdom) Tommy Harfield	(United Kingdom) Tommy Harfield	(United Kingdom) Chris Dittmann Racing	(Republic of Ireland) Fionn McLaughlin
10	R28	(United Kingdom) Brands Hatch (Grand Prix Circuit, Kent)	4 October	(Australia) James Piszcyk	(United Arab Emirates) Adam Al Azhari	(Australia) James Piszcyk	(New Zealand) Rodin Motorsport	(Republic of Ireland) Fionn McLaughlin
10	R29	(United Kingdom) Brands Hatch (Grand Prix Circuit, Kent)	5 October		(United Kingdom) Tommy Harfield	(United Kingdom) Tommy Harfield	(United Kingdom) Chris Dittmann Racing	(South Africa) Cole Hewetson
10	R30	(United Kingdom) Brands Hatch (Grand Prix Circuit, Kent)	5 October	(Australia) James Piszcyk	(Australia) James Piszcyk	(Australia) James Piszcyk	(New Zealand) Rodin Motorsport	(Republic of Ireland) Fionn McLaughlin

== Championship standings ==
Points are awarded to the top ten classified finishers in races 1 and 3 and for the top eight classified finishers in race 2. Race two, which has its grid formed by reversing the top twelve from the qualifying order, awards extra points, up until a maximum of ten, for positions gained from the drivers' respective starting positions. Two points are awarded for the best legal lap set in the qualifying session. Bonus points count towards only the drivers' standings. A brand new classification called the Challenge Cup for drivers competing in pre-selected seven rounds or less is held for the first time.

Races	Position, points per race										
Races	**1st**	**2nd**	**3rd**	**4th**	**5th**	**6th**	**7th**	**8th**	**9th**	**10th**	**FL**
Qualifying	2										
Races 1 & 3	25	18	15	12	10	8	6	4	2	1	1
Race 2	15	12	10	8	6	4	2	1			1

=== Drivers' standings ===
Pos	Driver	DPN (United Kingdom)			SILGP (United Kingdom)			SNE (United Kingdom)			THR (United Kingdom)			OUL (Note: Half points were awarded for the third race as it was suspended and not resumed, and the leader completed more than two laps but less than 75% of the original race distance.) (United Kingdom)			SILGP NC (United Kingdom)		ZAN (Netherlands)			KNO (United Kingdom)			DPGP (United Kingdom)			SILN (United Kingdom)			BRH (United Kingdom)			Pen.	Pts
1	(Republic of Ireland) Fionn McLaughlin	2	9^{1}	2	2	15	3	**18**	8^{3}	**1**	4	4^{5}	8	1	7^{4}	6	3	**Ret**	2	7^{5}	**1**	1	10	Ret	2	Ret	6	1	Ret	2	2	3^{5}	4		363.5
2	(Australia) James Piszcyk	9	5^{3}	3	**1**	12	**1**	Ret	12	4	Ret	3^{1}	6	13	1^{1}	4	13	12	4	4^{5}	2	6	5^{1}	11	4	1^{2}	5	4	8	3	**1**	10^{1}	**1**		311
3	(Hungary) Martin Molnár	7	2^{3}	5	3	10	2	5	9	2	1	8^{2}	2	**2**	20	**9**	7	5	1	8^{3}	Ret	5	7^{1}	18	3	20	2	8	23	**5**	5	7	6		277
4	(United Kingdom) Tommy Harfield	3	6^{1}	4	Ret	3^{2}	Ret	11	2^{1}	5	9	9^{5}	Ret	4	12^{4}	18	4	2	9	5^{8}	5	7	2^{3}	5	**1**	Ret	9	**2**	12	1	6	1	9		246
5	(United Kingdom) Ethan Jeff-Hall	4	18	10	7	7^{4}	4	3	7	13	Ret	10	9	7	4	17	2	7	5	6	3	4	13	Ret	8	3	4	5	1^{3}	8	3	5^{4}	3	3	206
6	(United Arab Emirates) Adam Al Azhari	8	11	17	17	1^{2}	10	1	4^{1}	19	Ret	6	4	12	10^{4}	5	8	14	Ret	2^{6}	Ret	Ret	1^{1}	4	7	2^{2}	Ret	6	4	11	4	8^{2}	2		199
7	(Sweden) August Raber	1	13	1	5	6^{2}	16	12	1	7	Ret	15	5	Ret	3	8	15	11	21	10^{9}	9	13	3	10	5	4^{1}	3	9	2^{1}	6	DNS	17^{6}	8	12	188
8	(United Kingdom) Thomas Bearman	5	4^{2}	9	6	4^{2}	7	9	15^{4}	10	Ret	2	Ret	Ret	5^{3}	1	5	3	Ret	21	7	2	Ret	**2**	24	5^{1}	20	Ret	11^{4}	10	10	4	10		153.5
9	(United Kingdom) Henry Joslyn	**Ret**	Ret	**11**	4	5^{2}	9	2	11	3	**3**	14	**3**	3	6^{1}	2	19	20	**3**	Ret	8	12	Ret	7	6	Ret	21	Ret	22	18	15	9^{4}	13	3	153
10	(United Kingdom) Rowan Campbell-Pilling	6	10	6	12	2^{2}	6	7	6	17	7	19	11	Ret	17	10	Ret	4	Ret	12^{2}	12	**3**	8^{3}	1	Ret	Ret	8	7	5^{8}	9	DNS	Ret	WD		127.5
11	(India) Ary Bansal										8	20	10	5	8^{1}	Ret	11	6	8	1	13	10	6^{1}	3	20	7^{1}	11	3	3^{7}	4					104
12	(Algeria) Leo Robinson	11	7^{7}	8	Ret	9^{5}	5	Ret	5^{2}	Ret	2	1^{2}	13	6	11^{2}	12	9	9																	82
13	(United Kingdom) Chase Fernandez	18	1^{1}	7	15	13	11	8	20	12	15	5	Ret	Ret	18	3			6	20	6	11	4	12	21	18	Ret	10	Ret	12	7	DSQ	7	9	67.5
14	(United Kingdom) Ella Lloyd	10	Ret	Ret				15	14	9	Ret	11	7	8	13^{5}	13	24	10	7	3^{2}	4	14	11^{2}	Ret				12	7	14					52
15	(Australia) Xavier Avramides	20	12^{4}	12	13	8	8	19	19	11	10	13^{10}	15	11	19	14	14	24	23	Ret	DNS	Ret	15^{1}	6	16	14^{9}	12	23	16^{7}	17	8	14^{3}	16		52
16	(South Africa) Cole Hewetson	16	15^{4}	18	10	17^{1}	15	14	17	Ret	14	12^{5}	14	10	15^{4}	Ret			12	19^{5}	22	9	14^{3}	13	10	21	7	14	17^{5}	Ret	19	2	12		50
17	(United States) Henry Mercier	17	17^{1}	14	8	14^{1}	13	20	21	15	Ret	22	16	15	2	7			15	16^{5}	16	15	19^{1}	Ret	23	10^{10}	14	18	19^{5}	22	16	16^{6}	21		48
18	(United Arab Emirates) Theo Palmer				DNS	16^{5}	12	6	10	8	6	16	Ret	Ret	9	11	6	18	19	9	11	8	9	9	15	13^{6}	18	16	9^{9}	20	Ret	11	11		46
19	(Colombia) Salim Hanna										5	7^{4}	1				**1**	1																	41
20	(Sweden) Joel Bergström	13	3	Ret	16	Ret	DNS	4	3	6	Ret	24	Ret																						40
21	(Belgium) Dries Van Langendonck																								14	9^{3}	**1**	DSQ	20	7	14	6	5	12	38
22	(United Kingdom) Charlie Edge	14	16^{5}	15	14	18	17	17	16^{7}	18	13	21^{2}	19				21	21	22	17^{10}	Ret				18	15^{10}	16	17	21	24					34
23	(Denmark) Alba Larsen	15	14^{6}	16				16	22	16	11	17^{5}	18	14	16^{4}	15			14	18^{5}	18	20	Ret	14				11	14^{7}	Ret					27
24	(Ukraine) Oleksandr Savinkov																12	8	16	DSQ	10				9	8^{5}	13	13	13^{10}	15	9	12^{3}	14		24
25	(China) Yuhao Fu	19	Ret	13	9	11^{5}	14	Ret	23	Ret	12	18	12	9	14^{1}	16	10	19	10	Ret	DNS	Ret	12^{2}	8	22	11^{6}	19	21	15^{10}	19	12	18^{3}	17	15	21
26	(Germany) Arjen Kräling																		11	13^{2}	19	17	16^{3}	15	12	6	10	15	10^{9}	23	11	15	22		19
27	(United Kingdom) Thomas Ingram Hill										Ret	23	17				23	Ret	13	11^{7}	14				11	12^{8}	Ret	22	18^{2}	21					17
28	(Israel) Guy Albag																Ret	13				18	18^{4}	19	17	16^{6}	15				20	20	18		10
29	(United Kingdom) Joseph Smith																					16	20^{3}	17	13	17^{1}	Ret	20	6	13	13	13^{1}	15		9
30	(Austria) Emma Felbermayr																		18	15^{7}	17														7
31	(United Kingdom) Harri Reynolds	12	8^{5}	19																															6
32	(Netherlands) Nina Gademan																16	23	20	14^{6}	15														6
33	(Poland) Piotr Orzechowski				18	20	19																		19	19^{5}	17				18	19^{1}	20		6
34	(Netherlands) Esmee Kosterman				11	19	18	13	18^{4}	Ret							20	17	17	Ret	21														4
35	(Pakistan) Haarni Sadiq																					19	17^{4}	16				19	Ret	16	17	21	19		4
36	(United Kingdom) Chloe Chong							10	13^{1}	14									Ret	Ret	20														2
non championship round entries ineligible for points
–	(United States) Ava Dobson																17	15																	–
–	(United Kingdom) Emily Cotty																18	16																	–
–	(Kuwait) Jaber Al Sabah																22	22																	–
Pos	Driver	DPN (United Kingdom)			SILGP (United Kingdom)			SNE (United Kingdom)			THR (United Kingdom)			OUL (United Kingdom)			SILGP NC (United Kingdom)		ZAN (Netherlands)			KNO (United Kingdom)			DPGP (United Kingdom)			SILN (United Kingdom)			BHGP (United Kingdom)			Pen.	Pts

Colour	Result
Gold	Winner
Silver	Second place
Bronze	Third place
Green	Points classification
Blue	Non-points classification
Blue	Non-classified finish (NC)
Purple	Retired, not classified (Ret)
Red	Did not qualify (DNQ)
Red	Did not pre-qualify (DNPQ)
Black	Disqualified (DSQ)
White	Did not start (DNS)
White	Withdrew (WD)
White	Race cancelled (C)
Blank	Did not practice (DNP)
Blank	Did not arrive (DNA)
Blank	Excluded (EX)

**Bold** – Pole
Italics – Fastest Lap
^{x} – Positions Gained

=== Rookie Cup ===
Pos	Driver	DPN (United Kingdom)			SILGP (United Kingdom)			SNE (United Kingdom)			THR (United Kingdom)			OUL (United Kingdom)			SILGP NC (United Kingdom)		ZAN (Netherlands)			KNO (United Kingdom)			DPGP (United Kingdom)			SILN (United Kingdom)			BHGP (United Kingdom)			Pen.	Pts
1	(Republic of Ireland) Fionn McLaughlin	2	9	2	2	15	3	18	8	1	4	4	8	1	7	6	3	Ret	2	7	1	1	10	Ret	2	Ret	6	1	Ret	2	2	3	4		524
2	(United Kingdom) Thomas Bearman	5	4	9	6	4	7	9	15	10	Ret	2	Ret	Ret	5	1	5	3	Ret	21	7	2	Ret	2	24	5	20	Ret	11	10	10	4	10		323.5
3	(South Africa) Cole Hewetson	16	15	18	10	17	15	14	17	Ret	14	12	14	10	15	Ret			12	19	22	9	14	13	10	21	7	14	17	Ret	19	2	12		250
4	(United Arab Emirates) Theo Palmer				DNS	16	12	6	10	8	6	16	20	Ret	9	11	6	18	19	9	11	8	9	9	15	13	18	16	9	20	Ret	11	11		249
5	(Australia) Xavier Avramides	20	12	12	13	8	8	19	19	11	10	13	15	11	19	14	14	24	23	Ret	DNS	Ret	15	6	16	14	12	23	16	17	8	14	16		229
6	(United States) Henry Mercier	17	17	14	8	14	13	20	21	15	Ret	22	16	15	2	7			15	16	16	15	19	Ret	23	10	14	18	19	22	16	16	21		187.5
7	(Denmark) Alba Larsen	15	14	16				16	22	16	11	17	18	14	16	15			14	18	18	10	Ret	14				11	14	Ret					146
8	(Germany) Arjen Kräling																		11	13	19	17	16	15	12	6	10	15	10	23	11	15	22		130
9	(United Kingdom) Charlie Edge	14	16	15	14	18	17	17	16	18	13	21	19				21	21	22	17	Ret				18	15	16	17	21	24					109
10	(Belgium) Dries Van Langendonck																								14	9	1	DSQ	20	7	14	6	5	12	85
11	(United Kingdom) Joseph Smith																					16	20	17	13	17	Ret	20	6	13	13	13	15		75
12	(Colombia) Salim Hanna										5	7	1				1	1																	53
13	(Pakistan) Haarni Sadiq																					19	17	16				19	Ret	16	17	21	19		32
14	(Austria) Emma Felbermayr																		18	15	17														26
15	(Israel) Guy Albag																Ret	13				18	18	19	17	16	15				20	20	18		23
16	(Poland) Piotr Orzechowski				18	20	19																		19	19	17				18	19	20		17
non championship round entries ineligible for points
–	(United Kingdom) Emily Cotty																18	16																	–
–	(Kuwait) Jaber Al Sabah																22	22																	–
Pos	Driver	DPN (United Kingdom)			SILGP (United Kingdom)			SNE (United Kingdom)			THR (United Kingdom)			OUL (United Kingdom)			SILGP NC (United Kingdom)		ZAN (Netherlands)			KNO (United Kingdom)			DPGP (United Kingdom)			SILN (United Kingdom)			BHGP (United Kingdom)			Pen.	Pts

=== Challenge Cup ===
Pos	Driver	DPN (United Kingdom)			SILGP (United Kingdom)			SNE (United Kingdom)			THR (United Kingdom)			OUL (United Kingdom)			SILGP NC (United Kingdom)		ZAN (Netherlands)			KNO (United Kingdom)			DPGP (United Kingdom)			SILN (United Kingdom)			BHGP (United Kingdom)			Pen.	Pts
1	(India) Ary Bansal										8	20	10	5	8	Ret	11	6	8	1	13	10	6	3	20	7	11	3	3	4					280
2	(United Kingdom) Ella Lloyd	10	Ret	Ret				15	14	9	Ret	11	7	8	13	13	24	10	7	3	4	14	11	Ret				12	7	14					258.5
3	(United Kingdom) Charlie Edge	14	17	15	14	18	17	17	16	18	13	21	19				21	21	22	17	Ret				18	15	16	17	21	24					215
4	(Denmark) Alba Larsen	15	14	16				16	22	16	11	17	18	14	16	15			14	18	18	20	Ret	14				11	14	Ret					194
5	(Germany) Arjen Kräling																		11	13	19	18	16	15	12	6	10	15	10	23	11	15	22		192
6	(United Kingdom) Joseph Smith																					14	20	17	13	17	Ret	20	6	13	13	13	15		139
7	(United Kingdom) Thomas Ingram Hill										Ret	23	17				23	Ret	13	11	14				11	12	Ret	22	18	21					97
8	(Pakistan) Haarni Sadiq																					19	17	16				19	Ret	16	17	21	19		87
9	(Colombia) Salim Hanna										5	7	1				1	1																	65
10	(United Kingdom) Harri Reynolds	12	8	19																															39
11	(Netherlands) Nina Gademan																16	23	20	14	15														20
entered but ineligible for the title after competing in more than seven rounds
–	(United Kingdom) Tommy Harfield	3	6	4	Ret	3	Ret	11	2	5	9	9	Ret	4	12	18	4	2	9	5	5	7	2	5	1	Ret	9	2	12	1	6	1	9		317.5
Pos	Driver	DPN (United Kingdom)			SILGP (United Kingdom)			SNE (United Kingdom)			THR (United Kingdom)			OUL (United Kingdom)			SILGP NC (United Kingdom)		ZAN (Netherlands)			KNO (United Kingdom)			DPGP (United Kingdom)			SILN (United Kingdom)			BHGP (United Kingdom)			Pen.	Pts

=== Teams' Cup ===
Pos	Team	DPN (United Kingdom)			SILGP (United Kingdom)			SNE (United Kingdom)			THR (United Kingdom)			OUL (United Kingdom)			SILGP NC (United Kingdom)		ZAN (Netherlands)			KNO (United Kingdom)			DPGP (United Kingdom)			SILN (United Kingdom)			BHGP (United Kingdom)			Pts
1	(New Zealand) Rodin Motorsport	8	5	3	1	1	1	1	4	4	Ret	3	4	8	1	4	8	10	4	2	2	6	1	4	4	1	1	4	4	3	1	6	1	537
1	(New Zealand) Rodin Motorsport	9	11	17	17	12	10	10	12	9	Ret	6	6	12	10	5	13	12	7	3	4	13	5	11	7	2	5	6	7	7	4	8	2	537
2	(United Kingdom) Hitech TGR	2	4	2	2	4	3	9	5	1	2	1	8	1	5	1	3	3	2	7	1	1	10	2	2	6	6	1	6	2	2	3	4	535.5
2	(United Kingdom) Hitech TGR	5	7	8	6	8	5	18	8	10	4	2	13	6	7	6	5	9	20	14	7	2	12	6	12	11	11	15	9	10	8	4	9	535.5
3	(United Kingdom) Phinsys by Argenti	1	13	1	5	6	4	3	1	7	Ret	10	5	7	2	7	2	7	5	6	3	4	3	10	5	3	3	5	1	6	3	5	3	392
3	(United Kingdom) Phinsys by Argenti	4	17	10	7	7	13	12	7	13	Ret	15	9	15	3	8	15	11	11	10	9	12	11	13	8	4	4	9	2	8	10	12	7	392
4	(United Kingdom) Virtuosi Racing	7	2	5	3	10	2	5	9	2	1	7	1	2	20	9	1	1	1	8	10	5	7	15	3	7	2	8	11	5	5	7	5	307
4	(United Kingdom) Virtuosi Racing										5	8	2				7	5	16	15	17				9	14	12	12	15	12	9	11	12	307
5	(United Kingdom) Fortec Motorsport	Ret	Ret	11	4	5	9	2	11	3	3	14	3	3	6	2	11	6	3	1	8	10	6	3	6	6	10	3	3	4	12	9	11	250
5	(United Kingdom) Fortec Motorsport										8	20	10	5	8	Ret	18	16	8	11	13	11	Ret	7	11	9	15	16	14	14				250
6	(United Kingdom) Chris Dittmann Racing	3	6	4	14	3	17	11	2	5	9	9	18	4	12	15	4	2	9	5	5	7	2	5	1	12	9	2	10	1	6	1	8	224
6	(United Kingdom) Chris Dittmann Racing	14	14	15	18	18	19	16	16	16	11	17	19	14	16	18	17	15	14	17	18	15	Ret	12	14	13	13	11	12	16	14	13	14	224
7	(United Kingdom) JHR Developments	6	3	6	11	2	6	4	3	6	7	19	11	Ret	17	10	20	4	17	12	12	3	8	1	Ret	Ret	8	7	5	9	13	14	13	155.5
7	(United Kingdom) JHR Developments	12	8	19	12	19	18	7	6	17	Ret	24	Ret				Ret	17	Ret	DNS	21	14	13	14				14	Ret	13	DNS	Ret	DNS	155.5
8	(United Arab Emirates) Xcel Motorsport	16	1	7	9	11	11	6	10	8	6	5	12	9	9	3	6	18	6	9	6	8	4	8	10	8	7	10	8	11	7	2	6	148.5
8	(United Arab Emirates) Xcel Motorsport	18	15	13	10	13	12	8	17	12	12	12	14	10	14	11	10	19	10	19	11	9	9	9	13	10	14	13	13	15	11	10	10	148.5
Pos	Team	DPN (United Kingdom)			SILGP (United Kingdom)			SNE (United Kingdom)			THR (United Kingdom)			OUL (United Kingdom)			SILGP NC (United Kingdom)		ZAN (Netherlands)			KNO (United Kingdom)			DPGP (United Kingdom)			SILN (United Kingdom)			BHGP (United Kingdom)			Pts
