= Adam Al Azhari =

Emirati racing driver (born 2009)

- آدم الأزهري
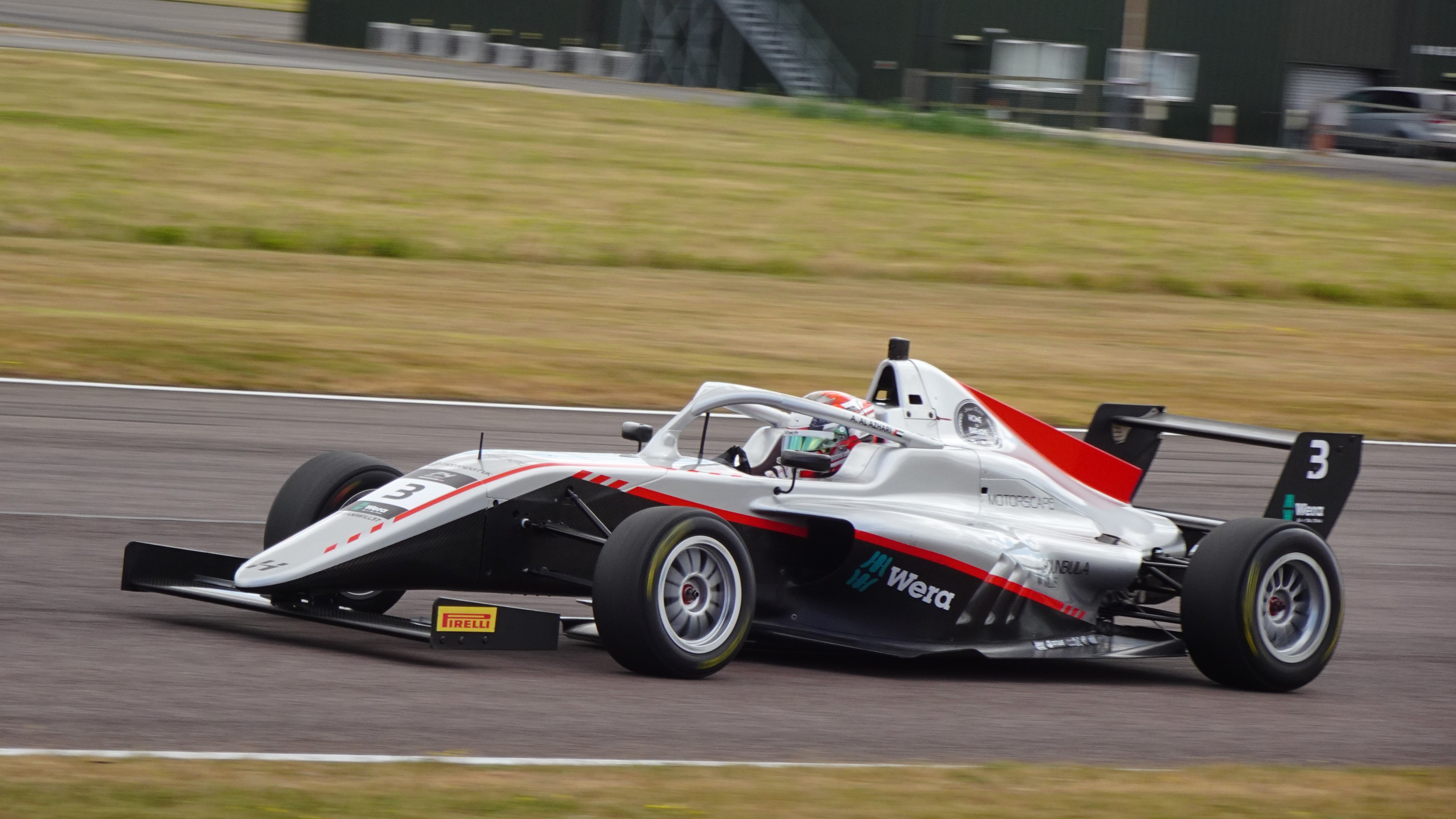
- Al Azhari in 2026
- Born: 26 June 2009 (age 17); Dubai, United Arab Emirates
- Relatives: Keanu Al Azhari (brother)
- Nationality: (United Arab Emirates) Emirati

F4 British Championship career
- Debut season: 2025
- Current team: Hitech
- Car number: 3
- Former teams: Rodin Motorsport
- Starts: 60
- Wins: 4
- Podiums: 10
- Poles: 2
- Fastest laps: 4
- Best finish: 6th in 2025

Previous series
- 2026; 2025; 2025; 2024–2025; 2024: UAE4; F4 Saudi Arabian; F4 Middle East; Formula Trophy UAE; F4 Spanish

Adam Al Azhari (Arabic: آدم الأزهري, romanized: Ādam al-Azharī; born 26 June 2009) is an Emirati racing driver who last competed in the F4 British Championship for Hitech.

Al Azhari is the 2025 F4 Saudi Arabian runner-up.

== Personal life ==
Al Azhari is the son of Karim Al Azhari, a German-Emirati businessman and former racing driver. Al Azhari is also the younger brother of fellow racing driver Keanu Al Azhari, who he raced against in his maiden season in Spanish F4.

== Career ==
=== Karting ===
Al Azhari obtained his first kart at the age of five, making his racing debut two years later and competing until 2024. During his karting career, he most notably won the 2018–19 RMC UAE series in Micro Max and the 2024 IAME Middle East Cup in X30 Senior.

=== Formula 4 ===
==== 2024 ====
In 2024, Al Azhari made his single-seater debut in the F4 Spanish Championship, racing for Tecnicar Motorsport from the third round onwards. Racing in the final five rounds, Al Azhari scored a best result of tenth in race one at MotorLand Aragón en route to a 24th-place points finish. At the end of the year, Al Azhari joined Yas Heat Racing to contest the inaugural season of the Formula Trophy UAE. In the three-round series, Al Azhari scored a best result of fifth in both Yas Marina rounds to end the year 12th in points.

==== 2025 ====
Al Azhari remained with Yas Heat Racing to race in the F4 Middle East Championship in early 2025, in which he won race one at Lusail, but was later disqualified after his clutch was found to be illegal. After ending the winter tenth in points with a best result of fifth, Al Azhari joined Rodin Motorsport for the rest of the year to compete in the F4 British Championship. Al Azhari scored his maiden win in the reverse-grid race at Silverstone, before taking further wins at Snetterton and Knockhill along with three more podiums to end the year sixth in points. At the end of the year, Al Azhari partook in the relaunched F4 Saudi Arabian Championship, scoring two wins in Bahrain and three podiums in Jeddah to end the season runner-up to Kit Belofsky. Also near the end of the year, Al Azhari reunited with Yas Heat Racing to compete in Formula Trophy, scoring podiums at Dubai and Yas Marina to end the year sixth in points.

==== 2026 ====
The following year, Al Azhari remained with Yas Heat Racing to race in the UAE4 Series, in which he scored a best result of fourth in the season-opening race at Yas Marina and ended the season 11th in points. For the rest of the year, Al Azhari joined Hitech to return to the F4 British Championship. Starting off the season with a podium at Brands Hatch from pole, Al Azhari then took further podiums at Snetterton and Silverstone, before winning the reverse-grid race at Thruxton and ending the year eighth overall.

== Karting record ==
=== Karting career summary ===
Season	Series	Team	Position
2018–19	Rotax Max Challenge UAE – Micro Max		1st
2019	WSK Euro Series – 60 Mini	Parolin Racing Kart	105th
2019	Rotax Max Challenge Grand Finals – Micro Max	Al Ain Raceway	12th
2021	Italian Karting Championship – OK-J	Team Driver Racing Kart	8th
2021	Champions of the Future – OK-J	Koski Motorsport	104th
2022	IAME Warriors Final – X30 Junior	EGP Racing Team	NC
2023	IAME Euro Series – X30 Senior	EGP Racing Team	47th
2023	IAME Warriors Final – X30 Senior	EGP Racing Team	NC
2023	Champions of the Future Academy Program – OK-N		20th
2024	IAME Middle East Cup – X30 Senior		1st

== Racing record ==
=== Racing career summary ===
Season	Series	Team	Races	Wins	Poles	F/Laps	Podiums	Points	Position
2024	F4 Spanish Championship	Tecnicar Motorsport	15	0	0	0	0	2	24th
2024	Formula Trophy UAE	Yas Heat Racing	7	0	0	0	0	24	12th
2025	F4 Middle East Championship	Yas Heat Racing Academy	15	0	1	1	0	78	10th
2025	F4 British Championship	Rodin Motorsport	30	3	0	3	6	199	6th
2025	F4 Saudi Arabian Championship	Valvoline	8	2	3	4	5	125	**2nd**
2025	Formula Trophy	Yas Heat Racing	7	0	0	1	2	51	6th
2026	UAE4 Series	Yas Heat Racing	12	0	0	0	0	33	11th
2026	F4 British Championship	Hitech	30	1	2	1	4	131	8th

* Season still in progress.

=== Complete F4 Spanish Championship results ===
(key) (Races in bold indicate pole position; races in italics indicate fastest lap)

Year	Entrant	1	2	3	4	5	6	7	8	9	10	11	12	13	14	15	16	17	18	19	20	21	Pos	Points
2024	Tecnicar Motorsport	JAR; 1	JAR; 2	JAR; 3	POR; 1	POR; 2	POR; 3	LEC; 1; 14	LEC; 2 Ret	LEC; 3; 21	ARA; 1; 10	ARA; 2; 20	ARA; 3; 20	CRT; 1; 20	CRT; 2; 19	CRT; 3; 12	JER; 1; 14	JER; 2; 11	JER; 3; 14	CAT; 1; 29	CAT; 2; 19	CAT; 3; 19	24th	2

=== Complete Formula Trophy UAE / Formula Trophy results ===
(key) (Races in bold indicate pole position; races in italics indicate fastest lap)

Year	Team	1	2	3	4	5	6	7	DC	Points
2024	Yas Heat Racing	DUB; 1; 12	DUB; 2 Ret	DUB; 3; 16	YMC1; 1; 11	YMC1; 2; 5	YMC2; 1; 5	YMC2; 2; 8	12th	24
2025	Yas Heat Racing	DUB; 1; 7	DUB; 2; 2	DUB; 3; 12	YMC1; 1; 27	YMC1; 2; 3	YMC2; 1; 4	YMC2; 2; 14	6th	51

=== Complete F4 Middle East Championship / UAE4 Series results ===
(key) (Races in bold indicate pole position; races in italics indicate fastest lap)

Year	Team	1	2	3	4	5	6	7	8	9	10	11	12	13	14	15	DC	Points
2025	Yas Heat Racing Academy	YMC1; 1; 9	YMC1; 2; 5	YMC1; 3; 6	YMC2; 1; 5	YMC2; 2; 11	YMC2; 3; 7	DUB; 1; 6	DUB; 2; 8	DUB; 3; 10	YMC3; 1; 8	YMC3; 2; 24	YMC3; 3; 10	**LUS**; **1** DSQ	LUS; 2; 23†	LUS; 3; 15	10th	78
2026	Yas Heat Racing	YMC1; 1; 4	YMC1; 2; 10	YMC1; 3; 37	YMC2; 1; 5	YMC2; 2; 15	YMC2; 3; 6	DUB; 1; 14	DUB; 2; 9	DUB; 3; 15	LUS; 1; 21	LUS; 2 Ret	LUS; 3; 11				11th	33

=== Complete F4 British Championship results ===
(key) (Races in bold indicate pole position) (Races in italics indicate fastest lap)

Year	Entrant	1	2	3	4	5	6	7	8	9	10	11	12	13	14	15	16	17	18	19	20	21	22	23	24	25	26	27	28	29	30	31	32	Pos	Points
2025	Rodin Motorsport	DPN; 1; 8	DPN; 2; 11	DPN; 3; 17	SILGP; 1; 17	SILGP; 2; 1^{2}	SILGP; 3; 10	SNE; 1; 1	SNE; 2; 4^{1}	SNE; 3; 19	THR; 1 Ret	THR; 2; 6	THR; 3; 4	OUL; 1; 12	OUL; 2; 10^{4}	OUL; 3; 5	SILGP; 1; 8	SILGP; 2; 14	ZAN; 1 Ret	ZAN; 2; 2^{6}	ZAN; 3 Ret	KNO; 1 Ret	KNO; 2; 1^{1}	KNO; 3; 4	DPGP; 1; 7	DPGP; 2; 2^{2}	DPGP; 3 Ret	SILN; 1; 6	SILN; 2; 4	SILN; 3; 11	BHGP; 1; 4	BHGP; 2; 8^{2}	BHGP; 3; 2	6th	199
2026	Hitech	DPN; 1; 9	DPN; 2 Ret	DPN; 3; 9	**BHI**; **1**; 2	BHI; 2; 21	**BHI**; **3**; 8	SNE; 1; 9	SNE; 2; 9^{2}	SNE; 3; 2	SILGP; 1; 2	SILGP; 2; 7^{1}	SILGP; 3; 6	ZAN; 1; 27	ZAN; 2; 10^{7}	ZAN; 3; 11	THR; 1 Ret	THR; 2; 1	THR; 3; 10	DPGP; 1; 14	DPGP; 2; 14^{6}	DPGP; 3; 12	CRO; 1; 6	CRO; 2; 21	CRO; 3 Ret	SILN; 1 Ret	SILN; 2; 11	SILN; 3; 6	BHGP; 1; 4	BHGP; 2; 5	BHGP; 3; 8			8th	131

* Season still in progress.

=== Complete F4 Saudi Arabian Championship results ===
(key) (Races in bold indicate pole position) (Races in italics indicate fastest lap)

Year	Team	1	2	3	4	5	6	7	8	9	10	DC	Points
2025	Valvoline	BHR1; 1; 7	**BHR1**; **2**; 1	**BHR2**; **1**; 1	BHR2; 2; 6	JED1; 1; 5	**JED1**; **2**; 2	JED2; 1; 2	JED2; 2; 3	JED3; 1	JED3; 2	2nd	125
