= Audi Driver Development Programme =

F1 young driver academy by Audi

(Germany) Audi Driver Development Programme
- Founded: 2026; 0 years ago
- Former names: Sauber Academy
- Base: Hinwil, Zürich, Switzerland
- Team principal(s): Allan McNish
- Current drivers: Formula 3 (United Kingdom) Freddie Slater; F1 Academy (Austria) Emma Felbermayr

The Audi Driver Development Programme is a driver development programme by Audi F1 Team to support drivers through the feeder series ladder to promote them to their Formula One team. The programme was launched in 2026 with Allan McNish leading the programme, and succeeded the Sauber Academy.

== Current drivers ==
Driver	Years	Current series	Titles as Audi Driver Development Programme driver
(United Kingdom) Freddie Slater	2026–	Formula Regional Oceania Trophy; FIA Formula 3	none
(Austria) Emma Felbermayr	2026–	F1 Academy	none
