= Fionn McLaughlin =

Irish racing driver (born 2007)

- Nationality: (Republic of Ireland) Irish
- Born: 29 October 2007 (age 19) Magherafelt, Northern Ireland

FIA Formula 3 Championship career
- Debut season: 2026
- Current team: Hitech
- Car number: 24
- Starts: 19
- Wins: 0
- Podiums: 0
- Poles: 0
- Fastest laps: 0
- Best finish: 27th in 2026

Previous series
- 2026; 2025; 2025: FR Oceania; F4 British; Formula Winter Series

Championship titles
- 2025: F4 British
- Statistics up to date as of 15 September 2026.

Fionn McLaughlin (born 29 October 2007) is an Irish racing driver from Northern Ireland who last competed in the FIA Formula 3 Championship for Hitech as part of the Red Bull Junior Team.

McLaughlin graduated to single-seaters in 2025, becoming that year's champion in British F4.

== Career ==
=== Karting (2016–2024) ===
McLaughlin began karting at the age of five, and by the time he was seven, he was competing in and winning various championships around Ireland. In 2019, McLaughlin finished 14th overall in the IAME Cadet class of the British Karting Championships. The following year, he competed in both Britain and Europe. In Italy he competed for Dino Chiesa's Kart Republic team.

In 2021, McLaughlin moved up to the junior category, winning at the PF International Kart Circuit and finishing fourth overall in the IAME Euro Series. The following year, he came second in the 2022 British IAME Junior X30 Championship and finished second in the IAME world finals held in Le Mans, France.

==== 2023 ====
In 2023, McLaughlin was invited to sign with the professional karting team, Kart Republic, racing as part of the VDK Team, based in Belgium. He would compete in the CIK-FIA European Championship finishing seventh overall in the Championship.

In 2023, McLaughlin would also compete in the FIA World Karting championship claiming pole position in his group. He would also claim three heat wins across the weekend narrowly missing out on winning the final due to an engine failure. In the same year, McLaughlin claimed fourth position in the Iame X30 European championships. He would also compete at the IAME world games in Portimão, Portugal claiming fifth position.

McLaughlin won the Champions of the Future Academy Program race in Abu Dhabi.

==== 2024 ====
In 2024, McLaughlin competed in the CIK-FIA European Karting Championship and the CIK-FIA World Karting Championship, finishing sixth overall in both. McLaughlin claimed third overall in the OK Champions of the Future Euro Series, claiming a race win in the fourth round of the championship, which took place in Kristianstad. He would also claim second place overall in the X30 IAME Euro Series.

=== Formula 4 (2025) ===
Following a shootout in Formula 4 and GP3 cars between 11 invited drivers at Jerez in August 2024, McLaughlin was chosen to be a member of the Red Bull Junior Team. He competed in both in the Formula Winter Series and the F4 British Championship with Hitech TGR. McLaughlin finished his debut campaign in the Formula Winter Series as rookie champion and third in the overall championship. Mclaughlin won the 2025 British Formula 4 Championship driving for Hitech by 52.5 points taking five wins across the season. He also won the rookie championship by 200.5 points.

=== Formula 3 (2026–present) ===
During the 2026 pre-season, McLaughlin raced in the Formula Regional Oceania Trophy with Hitech TGR. In 2026, McLaughlin stepped up to FIA Formula 3 with Hitech, partnering Michael Shin and Jin Nakamura.

== Karting record ==
=== Karting career summary ===
Season	Series	Team (s)	Position
2016	Tullyallen Championship — Honda Cadet	MCL Racing	**1st**
2016	Ulster Cup Championship — Honda Cadet		**3rd**
2017	LGM Series — IAME Cadet	Strawberry Racing	35th
2018	LGM Series — IAME Cadet	Strawberry Racing	23rd
2019	Kartmasters British Grand Prix — IAME Cadet	Strawberry Racing	18th
2019	British Karting Championship — IAME Cadet	Strawberry Racing	14th
2020	Andrea Margutti Trophy — 60 Mini	Team Driver Racing Kart	8th
2020	Kartmasters British Grand Prix — IAME Cadet	Fusion Motorsport	**2nd**
2020	IAME Euro Series — X30 Junior	Fusion Motorsport	5th
2021	IAME Winter Cup — X30 Junior	Fusion Motorsport	4th
2021	British Karting Championship — X30 Junior	Fusion Motorsport	8th
2021	Champions of the Future — OKJ		63rd
2022	IAME Winter Cup — X30 Senior	Fusion Motorsport	23rd
2022	LGM Series — X30 Junior	Fusion Motorsport	28th
2022	Kartmasters British Grand Prix — X30 Junior	Fusion Motorsport	6th
2022	British Karting Championship — X30 Junior	Fusion Motorsport	**2nd**
2022	IAME Euro Series — X30 Senior	Fusion Motorsport	18th
2022	IAME Warriors Final — X30 Junior	Fusion Motorsport	**2nd**
2023	IAME Euro Series — X30 Senior	VDK Racing	4th
2023	CIK-FIA European Championship — OK	VDK Racing	7th
2023	CIK-FIA World Championship — OK	VDK Racing	19th
2023	Champions of the Future — OK	VDK Racing	16th
2023	IAME World Finals — X30 Senior	VDK Racing	5th
2024	IAME Winter Cup — X30 Senior	VDK Racing	34th
2024	CIK-FIA European Championship — OK	VDK Racing	6th
2024	CIK-FIA World Championship — OK	VDK Racing	6th
2024	Champions of the Future — OK	VDK Racing	**3rd**
2024	IAME Euro Series — X30 Senior	VDK Racing	**2nd**

=== Complete CIK-FIA results ===
==== Complete CIK-FIA Karting World Championship results ====
Year	Entrant	Class	Circuit	QH	SH	F
2023	VDK Racing	OK	(Italy) Franciacorta	3rd	3rd	Ret (Note: Did not finish, but was classified 19th.)
2024	VDK Racing	OK	(United Kingdom) PF International	6th	3rd	6th

==== Complete CIK-FIA Karting European Championship results ====
(key) (Races in bold indicate pole position; races in italics indicate fastest lap)

Year	Entrant	Class	1	2	3	4	5	6	7	8	9	10	11	12	Pos	Points
2023	VDK Racing	OK	VAL; QH; 34	VAL; SH; 31	VAL; F 22	TŘI; QH; 9	TŘI; SH; 10	TŘI; F 6	RØD; QH; 14	RØD; SH; 14	RØD; F 11	CRE; QH; 4	CRE; SH; 4	CRE; F 6	7th	84
2024	VDK Racing	OK	VAL; QH; 18	VAL; SH; 28	VAL; F 15	ARG; QH; 4	ARG; SH; 4	ARG; F 10	SVK; QH; 15	SVK; SH; 15	SVK; F 8	KRI; QH; 3	KRI; SH; 1	**KRI**; **F** 3	6th	157

== Racing record ==
=== Racing career summary ===
Season	Series	Team	Races	Wins	Poles	F/Laps	Podiums	Points	Position
2025	Formula Winter Series	Hitech TGR	12	3	0	1	6	151	**3rd**
2025	F4 British Championship	Hitech TGR	30	5	3	8	14	363.5	1st
2025	FIA F4 World Cup		1	0	0	0	0	—N/a	13th
2026	Formula Regional Oceania Trophy	Hitech	15	0	0	0	0	124	13th
2026	FIA Formula 3 Championship	Hitech	19	0	0	0	0	2	27th

* Season still in progress.

=== Complete Formula Winter Series results ===
(key) (Races in bold indicate pole position) (Races in italics indicate fastest lap)

Year	Team	1	2	3	4	5	6	7	8	9	10	11	12	DC	Points
2025	Hitech TGR	POR; 1; 5	POR; 2; 23	POR; 3; 1	CRT; 1; 7	CRT; 2; 8	CRT; 3; 8	ARA; 1; 3	ARA; 2; 1	ARA; 3; 1	CAT; 1; 2	CAT; 2; 2	CAT; 3; 24	3rd	151

=== Complete F4 British Championship results ===
(key) (Races in bold indicate pole position) (Races in italics indicate fastest lap)

Year	Team	1	2	3	4	5	6	7	8	9	10	11	12	13	14	15	16	17	18	19	20	21	22	23	24	25	26	27	28	29	30	31	32	DC	Points
2025	Hitech TGR	DPN; 1; 2	DPN; 2; 9^{1}	DPN; 3; 2	SILGP; 1; 2	SILGP; 2; 15	SILGP; 3; 3	**SNE**; **1**; 18	SNE; 2; 8^{3}	**SNE**; **3**; 1	THR; 1; 4	THR; 2; 4^{5}	THR; 3; 8	OUL; 1; 1	OUL; 2; 7^{4}	OUL; 3; 6	SILGP; 1; 3	**SILGP**; **2** Ret	ZAN; 1; 2	ZAN; 2; 7^{5}	**ZAN**; **3**; 1	KNO; 1; 1	KNO; 2; 10	KNO; 3 Ret	DPGP; 1; 2	DPGP; 2 Ret	DPGP; 3; 5	SILN; 1; 1	SILN; 2 Ret	SILN; 3; 2	BHGP; 1; 2	BHGP; 2; 3^{5}	BHGP; 3; 4	1st	363.5

=== Complete FIA F4 World Cup results ===
Year	Car	Qualifying	Quali Race	Main Race
2025	Mygale M21-F4	7th	12th	13th

=== Complete Formula Regional Oceania Trophy results ===
(key) (Races in bold indicate pole position) (Races in italics indicate fastest lap)

Year	Team	1	2	3	4	5	6	7	8	9	10	11	12	13	14	15	16	DC	Points
2026	Hitech	HMP; 1; 13	HMP; 2; 7	HMP; 3; 12	HMP; 4; 11	TAU; 1; 17	TAU; 2; 19	TAU; 3; 15	TAU; 4; 14	TER; 1; 9	TER; 2; 7	TER; 3 C	TER; 4; 6	HIG; 1; 12	HIG; 2; 15	HIG; 3; 13	HIG; 4; 11	13th	124

=== Complete FIA Formula 3 Championship results ===
(key) (Races in bold indicate pole position) (Races in italics indicate fastest lap)

Year	Entrant	1	2	3	4	5	6	7	8	9	10	11	12	13	14	15	16	17	18	19	DC	Points
2026	Hitech	MEL; SPR; 15	MEL; FEA; 14	MON; SPR; 13	MON; FEA; 21	CAT; SPR; 20	CAT; FEA; 26	RBR; SPR; 28	RBR; FEA; 24	SIL; SPR; 9	SIL; FEA; 19	SPA; SPR; 23	SPA; FEA; 13	HUN; SPR; 19	HUN; FEA; 16	MNZ; SPR; 14	MNZ; FEA; Ret	MAD; SPR; 13	MAD; FEA1; Ret	MAD; FEA2; 14	27th	2
