= Ary Bansal =

Indian racing driver (born 2009)

- आर्यमन बंसल
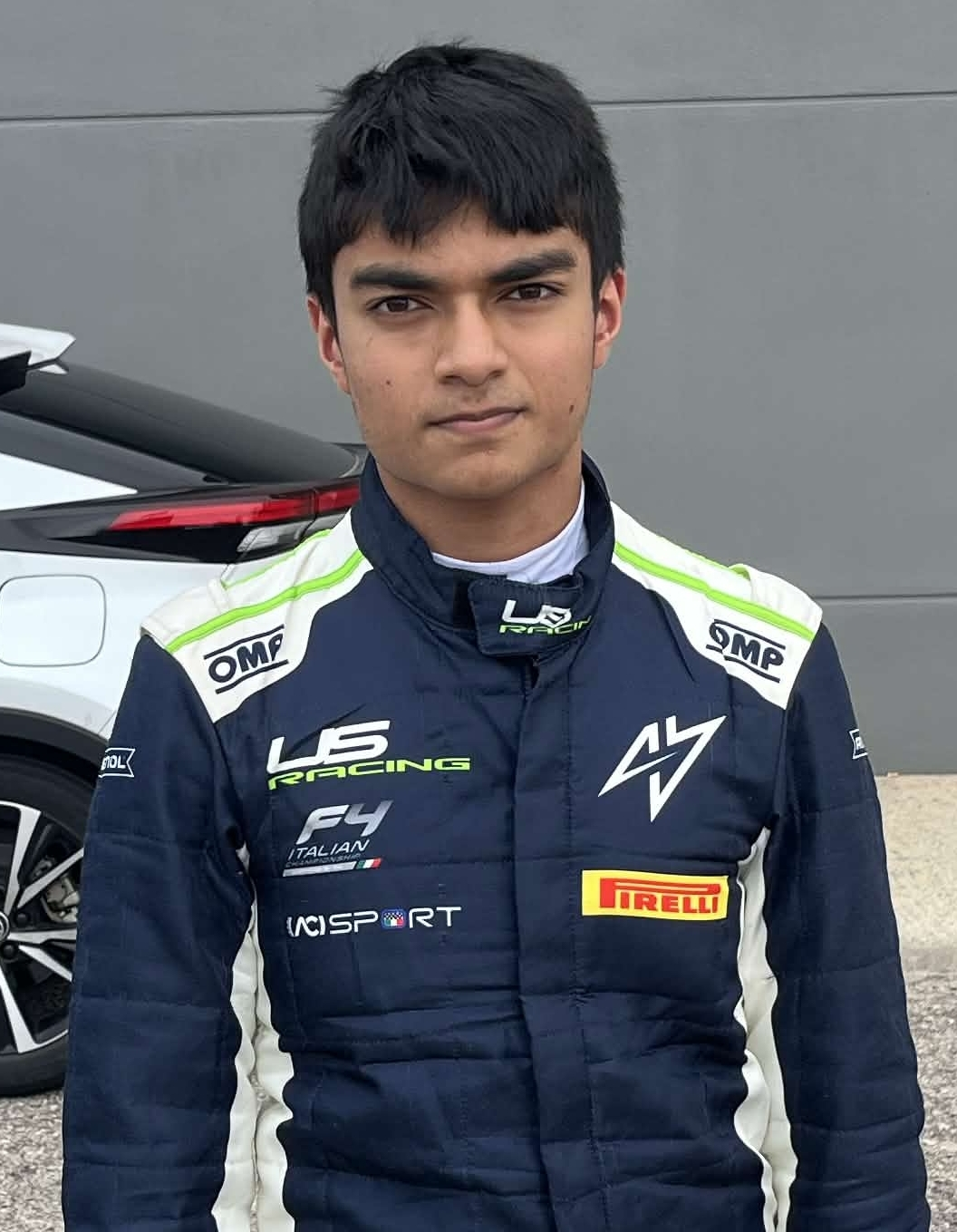
- Bansal in 2026
- Born: Aryaman Bansal; 8 November 2009 (age 17); Chandigarh, India
- Father: Sachin Bansal
- Nationality: (India) Indian

Italian F4 Championship career
- Debut season: 2025
- Current team: US Racing
- Car number: 46
- Starts: 24
- Wins: 2
- Podiums: 6
- Poles: 1
- Fastest laps: 0
- Best finish: 5th in 2025

Previous series
- 2026; 2026; 2026; 2026; 2025; 2025–2026; 2025; 2025; 2024; 2024: GB3; Euroformula Open; FR European; Formula Winter Series; F4 Saudi Arabian; E4; F4 British; GB4; Formula Trophy UAE; F4 Spanish

Championship titles
- 2025: GB4 Championship
- Statistics up to date as of 18 November 2026.

Aryaman "Ary" Bansal (Hindi: आर्यमन बंसल; born 8 November 2009) is an Indian racing driver who last competed in the Italian F4 Championship for US Racing.

Born in Chandigarh and raised in Bengaluru, Bansal won his maiden title at the 2025 GB4 Championship with Elite.

== Early life ==
Aryaman Bansal was born on 8 November 2009 in Chandigarh, India to Priya and Sachin Bansal, founder of Flipkart. He is based in Bengaluru.

== Racing career ==
=== Formula 4 (2024–present) ===
==== 2024 ====
Shortly after turning 15, Bansal made his Formula 4 debut in the final round of the 2025 F4 Spanish Championship at the Circuit de Barcelona-Catalunya for Rodin Motorsport. His highest would be a nineteenth place during the first race.

Bansal also competed in the inaugural season of the Formula Trophy UAE for Xcel Motorsport. He scored in four of the six races during the campaign, his highest being a fifth place during the second race at the Dubai Autodrome, as he placed fourteenth in the standings.

==== 2025 ====
For Bansal's main campaign, he competed in the GB4 Championship with Elite Motorsport. He began his season positively, taking his first win during the opening round in Donington Park, before securing a double podium in Silverstone. More points followed in Oulton Park, and claimed a commanding double victory in Snetterton after taking his first poles. He scored consistent podiums during the next two rounds, allowing to enter the final round in Donington with a shot for the title. Despite a substantial margin to championship leader Daniel Guinchard, Bansal took three podiums out of four that weekend which included a win, allowing him to seal the title by eleven points in the final race.

Bansal also competed in the Challenge Cup of the F4 British Championship with Fortec Motorsports, where he competed from the fourth round onwards. He managed good points during the first rounds that he competed, before taking his first British F4 win during the reverse-grid race in Zandvoort. His momentum continued into the next three rounds, earning podiums in both Knockhill and Silverstone. Despite missing the final round in Brands Hatch due to a GB4 clash, he managed to win the Challenge Cup whilst placing eleventh in the main championship with 104 points.

Bansal also raced in the E4 Championship with US Racing, he took one points finish in Paul Ricard and finished nineteenth overall with two points. He then made a cameo appearance in Italian F4 during the season finale in Misano, he scored no points and had a highest finish of fifteenth. Bansal also made appearances in two rounds of the F4 Saudi Arabian Championship with My-Car; he scored a podium in Bahrain, before taking a win and a double pole in Jeddah.

In November, Bansal raced in the FIA F4 World Cup, he finished fifth during the main race.

==== 2026 ====
In 2026, Bansal returned with US Racing full-time to contest the full Italian F4 and E4 championships.

=== Formula Regional (2026–) ===
Bansal joined CL Motorsport for the final round of the 2026 Formula Regional European Championship in Hockenheim. His best result out of the pair of races was an eleventh in the first race. Later that year, he joined Trident to compete in the Macau Grand Prix.

== Karting record ==
=== Karting career summary ===
| Season | Series | Team | Position |
|---|---|---|---|
| 2022 | Champions of the Future — OK-J | Forza Racing | 73rd |
| 2022 | CIK-FIA European Championship — OK-J | Forza Racing | 76th |
| 2022 | WSK Euro Series — OK-J | Forza Racing | 52nd |
| 2022 | CIK-FIA World Championship — OK-J | Forza Racing | 85th |
| 2022 | Italian Championship — OK-J | | 48th |
| 2023 | RMC Winter Cup — Junior Max | Strawberry Racing | 34th |
| 2023 | Rotax Max Euro Trophy — Junior Max | | 48th |
| 2023 | IAME Asia Final — X30 Junior | | 2nd |
| 2024 | Kartmasters British Grand Prix — Junior Max | Strawberry Racing | 31st |
| 2024 | British Championships — Junior Max | Strawberry Racing | 19th |
| 2024 | RMC Asia Festival — Senior Max | Stratos | 25th |

== Racing record ==
=== Racing career summary ===
| Season | Series | Team | Races | Wins | Poles | F/Laps | Podiums | Points | Position |
|---|---|---|---|---|---|---|---|---|---|
| 2024 | F4 Spanish Championship | Rodin Motorsport | 3 | 0 | 0 | 0 | 0 | 0 | NC† |
| 2024 | Formula Trophy UAE | Xcel Motorsport | 7 | 0 | 0 | 0 | 0 | 14 | 14th |
| 2025 | GB4 Championship | Elite Motorsport | 21 | 4 | 2 | 4 | 11 | 402 | 1st |
| 2025 | F4 British Championship | Fortec Motorsport | 18 | 1 | 0 | 0 | 4 | 104 | 11th |
| 2025 | E4 Championship | US Racing | 9 | 0 | 0 | 1 | 0 | 2 | 19th |
| 2025 | Italian F4 Championship | US Racing | 3 | 0 | 0 | 0 | 0 | 0 | 39th |
| 2025 | F4 Saudi Arabian Championship | My-Car | 4 | 1 | 2 | 1 | 3 | 73 | 6th |
| 2025 | FIA F4 World Cup | | 1 | 0 | 0 | 0 | 0 | —N/a | 5th |
| 2026 | Formula Winter Series | US Racing | 15 | 2 | 0 | 2 | 3 | 148 | 3rd |
| 2026 | Italian F4 Championship | US Racing | 21 | 2 | 1 | 0 | 6 | 309 | 5th |
| 2026 | E4 Championship | US Racing | 9 | 1 | 1 | 1 | 2 | 103 | 6th |
| 2026 | Formula Regional European Championship | CL Motorsport | 2 | 0 | 0 | 0 | 0 | 0 | 29th |
| 2026 | Euroformula Open Championship | BVM Racing | 3 | 0 | 0 | 0 | 1 | 0 | NC† |
| 2026 | GB3 Championship | TJ Speed Motorsports | 3 | 0 | 0 | 0 | 0 | 0 | NC† |
| 2026 | Macau Grand Prix | Trident | 0 | 0 | 0 | 0 | 0 | —N/a | TBD |

* Season still in progress.

=== Complete F4 Spanish Championship results ===
(key) (Races in bold indicate pole position; races in italics indicate fastest lap)

| Year | Entrant | 1 | 2 | 3 | 4 | 5 | 6 | 7 | 8 | 9 | 10 | 11 | 12 | 13 | 14 | 15 | 16 | 17 | 18 | 19 | 20 | 21 | Pos | Points |
|---|---|---|---|---|---|---|---|---|---|---|---|---|---|---|---|---|---|---|---|---|---|---|---|---|
| 2024 | Rodin Motorsport | JAR; 1 | JAR; 2 | JAR; 3 | POR; 1 | POR; 2 | POR; 3 | LEC; 1 | LEC; 2 | .LEC; 3 | ARA; 1 | ARA; 2 | ARA; 3 | CRT; 1 | CRT; 2 | CRT; 3 | JER; 1 | JER; 2 | JER; 3 | CAT; 1; 19 | CAT; 2; 21 | CAT; 3; 29 | NC† | 0 |

^{†} As Bansal was a guest driver, he was ineligible for points.

=== Complete Formula Trophy UAE results ===
(key) (Races in bold indicate pole position; races in italics indicate fastest lap)

| Year | Team | 1 | 2 | 3 | 4 | 5 | 6 | 7 | DC | Points |
|---|---|---|---|---|---|---|---|---|---|---|
| 2024 | Xcel Motorsport | DUB; 1; 14 | DUB; 2; 10 | DUB; 3; 5 | YMC1; 1; 12 | YMC1; 2; 12 | YMC2; 1; 9 | YMC2; 2; 10 | 14th | 14 |

=== Complete GB4 Championship results ===
(key) (Races in bold indicate pole position; races in italics indicate fastest lap; ^{superscript} indicates points for positions gained)

| Year | Entrant | 1 | 2 | 3 | 4 | 5 | 6 | 7 | 8 | 9 | 10 | 11 | 12 | 13 | 14 | 15 | 16 | 17 | 18 | 19 | 20 | 21 | 22 | Pos | Points |
|---|---|---|---|---|---|---|---|---|---|---|---|---|---|---|---|---|---|---|---|---|---|---|---|---|---|
| 2025 | Elite Motorsport | DON; 1; 21 | DON; 2; 1 | DON; 3; 5^{5} | SIL1; 1; 2 | SIL1; 2; 3 | SIL1; 3; 4^{5} | OUL; 1; 16 | OUL; 2; 8 | OUL; 3; 10 | **SNE**; **1**; 1 | **SNE**; **2**; 1 | SNE; 3 Ret | SIL2; 1; 8 | SIL2; 2; 8 | SIL2; 3; 3^{1} | BRH; 1; 2 | BRH; 2; 2 | BRH; 3 C | DON2; 1; 2 | DON2; 2; 9 | DON2; 3; 1^{3} | DON2; 3; 3^{7} | 1st | 402 |

=== Complete F4 British Championship results ===
(key) (Races in bold indicate pole position; races in italics indicate fastest lap; ^{superscript} indicates points for positions gained)

| Year | Entrant | 1 | 2 | 3 | 4 | 5 | 6 | 7 | 8 | 9 | 10 | 11 | 12 | 13 | 14 | 15 | 16 | 17 | 18 | 19 | 20 | 21 | 22 | 23 | 24 | 25 | 26 | 27 | 28 | 29 | 30 | 31 | 32 | Pos | Points |
|---|---|---|---|---|---|---|---|---|---|---|---|---|---|---|---|---|---|---|---|---|---|---|---|---|---|---|---|---|---|---|---|---|---|---|---|
| 2025 | Fortec Motorsport | DPN; 1 | DPN; 2 | DPN; 3 | SILGP; 1 | SILGP; 2 | SILGP; 3 | SNE; 1 | SNE; 2 | SNE; 3 | THR; 1; 8 | THR; 2; 20 | THR; 3; 10 | OUL; 1; 5 | OUL; 2; 8^{1} | OUL; 3 Ret | SILGP; 1; 11 | SILGP; 2; 6 | ZAN; 1; 8 | ZAN; 2; 1 | ZAN; 3; 13 | KNO; 1; 10 | KNO; 2; 6^{1} | KNO; 3; 3 | DPGP; 1; 20 | DPGP; 2; 7^{1} | DPGP; 3; 11 | SILN; 1; 3 | SILN; 2; 3^{7} | SILN; 3; 4 | BHGP; 1 | BHGP; 2 | BHGP; 3 | 11th | 104 |

=== Complete E4 Championship results ===
(key) (Races in bold indicate pole position; races in italics indicate fastest lap)

| Year | Team | 1 | 2 | 3 | 4 | 5 | 6 | 7 | 8 | 9 | DC | Points |
|---|---|---|---|---|---|---|---|---|---|---|---|---|
| 2025 | US Racing | LEC; 1 Ret | LEC; 2; 13 | LEC; 3; 9 | MUG; 1; 15 | MUG; 2; 19 | MUG; 3; 15 | MNZ; 1 Ret | MNZ; 2 Ret | MNZ; 3; 23 | 19th | 2 |
| 2026 | US Racing | VLL; 1; 21 | VLL; 2; 10 | VLL; 3; 5 | LEC; 1; 11 | LEC; 2; 6 | LEC; 3; 3 | **MNZ**; **1**; 27† | MNZ; 2; 1 | MNZ; 3; 20 | 6th | 103 |

=== Complete Italian F4 Championship results ===
(key) (Races in bold indicate pole position; races in italics indicate fastest lap)

| Year | Entrant | 1 | 2 | 3 | 4 | 5 | 6 | 7 | 8 | 9 | 10 | 11 | 12 | 13 | 14 | 15 | 16 | 17 | 18 | 19 | 20 | 21 | 22 | 23 | 24 | 25 | 26 | 27 | 28 | Pos | Points |
|---|---|---|---|---|---|---|---|---|---|---|---|---|---|---|---|---|---|---|---|---|---|---|---|---|---|---|---|---|---|---|---|
| 2025 | US Racing | MIS1; 1 | MIS1; 2 | MIS1; 3 | MIS1; 4 | VLL; 1 | VLL; 2 | VLL; 3 | VLL; 4 | MNZ; 1 | MNZ; 2 | MNZ; 3 | MUG; 1 | MUG; 2 | MUG; 3 | IMO; 1 | IMO; 2 | IMO; 3 | CAT; 1 | CAT; 2 | CAT; 3 | MIS2; 1 | MIS2; 2; 15 | MIS2; 3; 27 | MIS2; 4; 18 | MIS2; 5 | | | | 39th | 0 |
| 2026 | US Racing | MIS1; 1; 3 | MIS1; 2 | MIS1; 3; 8 | MIS1; 4; 2 | VLL; 1; 10 | VLL; 2 | VLL; 3; 6 | VLL; 4; 9 | MNZ; 1; 2 | MNZ; 2 | MNZ; 3; 13 | MNZ; 4; 5 | MUG1; 1 | MUG1; 2; 1 | MUG1; 3; 10 | MUG1; 4; 6 | IMO; 1 | IMO; 2; 5 | IMO; 3; 3 | IMO; 4; 6 | **MIS2**; **1**; 1 | MIS2; 2; 28† | MIS2; 3 | MIS2; 4; 8 | MUG2; 1; 10 | MUG2; 2; 13 | MUG2; 3 | MUG2; 4 Ret | 5th | 309 |

=== Complete F4 Saudi Arabian Championship results ===
(key) (Races in bold indicate pole position) (Races in italics indicate fastest lap)

| Year | Team | 1 | 2 | 3 | 4 | 5 | 6 | 7 | 8 | 9 | 10 | DC | Points |
|---|---|---|---|---|---|---|---|---|---|---|---|---|---|
| 2025 | My-Car | BHR1; 1 | BHR1; 2 | BHR2; 1; 4 | BHR2; 2; 2 | JED1; 1 | JED1; 2 | JED2; 1 | JED2; 2 | **JED3**; **1**; 2 | **JED3**; **2**; 1 | 6th | 73 |

=== Complete FIA F4 World Cup results ===
| Year | Car | Qualifying | Quali Race | Main Race |
|---|---|---|---|---|
| 2025 | Mygale M21-F4 | 9th | 4th | 5th |

=== Complete Formula Winter Series results ===
(key) (Races in bold indicate pole position; races in italics indicate fastest lap)

| Year | Entrant | 1 | 2 | 3 | 4 | 5 | 6 | 7 | 8 | 9 | 10 | 11 | 12 | 13 | 14 | 15 | Pos | Points |
|---|---|---|---|---|---|---|---|---|---|---|---|---|---|---|---|---|---|---|
| 2026 | US Racing | EST; 1; 28 | EST; 2; 5 | EST; 3; 4 | POR; 1; 1 | POR; 2; 5 | POR; 3; 6 | CRT; 1; 5 | CRT; 2; 5 | CRT; 3; 6 | ARA; 1; 1 | ARA; 2; 11 | ARA; 3 Ret | CAT; 1; 5 | CAT; 2 Ret | CAT; 3; 2 | 3rd | 148 |

=== Complete Formula Regional European Championship results ===
(key) (Races in bold indicate pole position; races in italics indicate fastest lap)

| Year | Entrant | 1 | 2 | 3 | 4 | 5 | 6 | 7 | 8 | 9 | 10 | 11 | 12 | 13 | 14 | 15 | 16 | 17 | 18 | 19 | 20 | Pos | Points |
|---|---|---|---|---|---|---|---|---|---|---|---|---|---|---|---|---|---|---|---|---|---|---|---|
| 2026 | CL Motorsport | RBR; 1 | RBR; 2 | RBR; 3 | ZAN; 1 | ZAN; 2 | SPA; 1 | SPA; 2 | SPA; 3 | MNZ; 1 | MNZ; 2 | MNZ; 3 | HUN; 1 | HUN; 2 | LEC; 1 | LEC; 2 | IMO; 1 | IMO; 2 | IMO; 3 | HOC; 1; 11 | HOC; 2; 23 | 29th | 0 |

=== Complete Euroformula Open Championship results ===
(key) (Races in bold indicate pole position; races in italics indicate fastest lap)

| Year | Entrant | 1 | 2 | 3 | 4 | 5 | 6 | 7 | 8 | 9 | 10 | 11 | 12 | 13 | 14 | 15 | 16 | 17 | 18 | 19 | 20 | 21 | 22 | 23 | 24 | Pos | Points |
|---|---|---|---|---|---|---|---|---|---|---|---|---|---|---|---|---|---|---|---|---|---|---|---|---|---|---|---|
| 2026 | BVM Racing | PRT; 1 | PRT; 2 | PRT; 3 | SPA; 1 | SPA; 2 | SPA; 3 | MIS; 1 | MIS; 2 | MIS; 3 | HUN; 1 | HUN; 2 | HUN; 3 | LEC; 1 | LEC; 2 | LEC; 3 | HOC; 1 | HOC; 2 | HOC; 3 | MNZ; 1 | MNZ; 2 | MNZ; 3 | CAT; 1; 9 | CAT; 2; 7 | CAT; 3; 2 | NC† | 0 |

^{†} As Bansal was a guest driver, he was ineligible to score points.

=== Complete GB3 Championship results ===
(key) (Races in bold indicate pole position; races in italics indicate fastest lap)

| Year | Entrant | 1 | 2 | 3 | 4 | 5 | 6 | 7 | 8 | 9 | 10 | 11 | 12 | 13 | 14 | 15 | 16 | 17 | 18 | 19 | 20 | 21 | 22 | 23 | 24 | Pos | Points |
|---|---|---|---|---|---|---|---|---|---|---|---|---|---|---|---|---|---|---|---|---|---|---|---|---|---|---|---|
| 2026 | TJ Speed Motorsports | SIL1; 1 | SIL1; 2 | SIL1; 3 | SPA; 1 | SPA; 2 | SPA; 3 | HUN; 1 | HUN; 2 | HUN; 3 | RBR; 1 | RBR; 2 | RBR; 3 | SIL2; 1 | SIL2; 2 | SIL2; 3 | DON; 1 | DON; 2 | DON; 3 | BRH; 1 | BRH; 2 | BRH; 3 | CAT; 1; 15 | CAT; 2; 13 | CAT; 3; 7^{7} | NC† | 0 |

^{†} As Bansal was a guest driver, he was ineligible to score points.

=== Complete Macau Grand Prix results ===
| Year | Team | Car | Qualifying | Quali Race | Main Race |
|---|---|---|---|---|---|
| 2026 | (Italy) Trident | Tatuus T-326 | TBD | TBD | TBD |
