= Fortec Motorsport =

Racing team

(United Kingdom) Fortec Motorsport
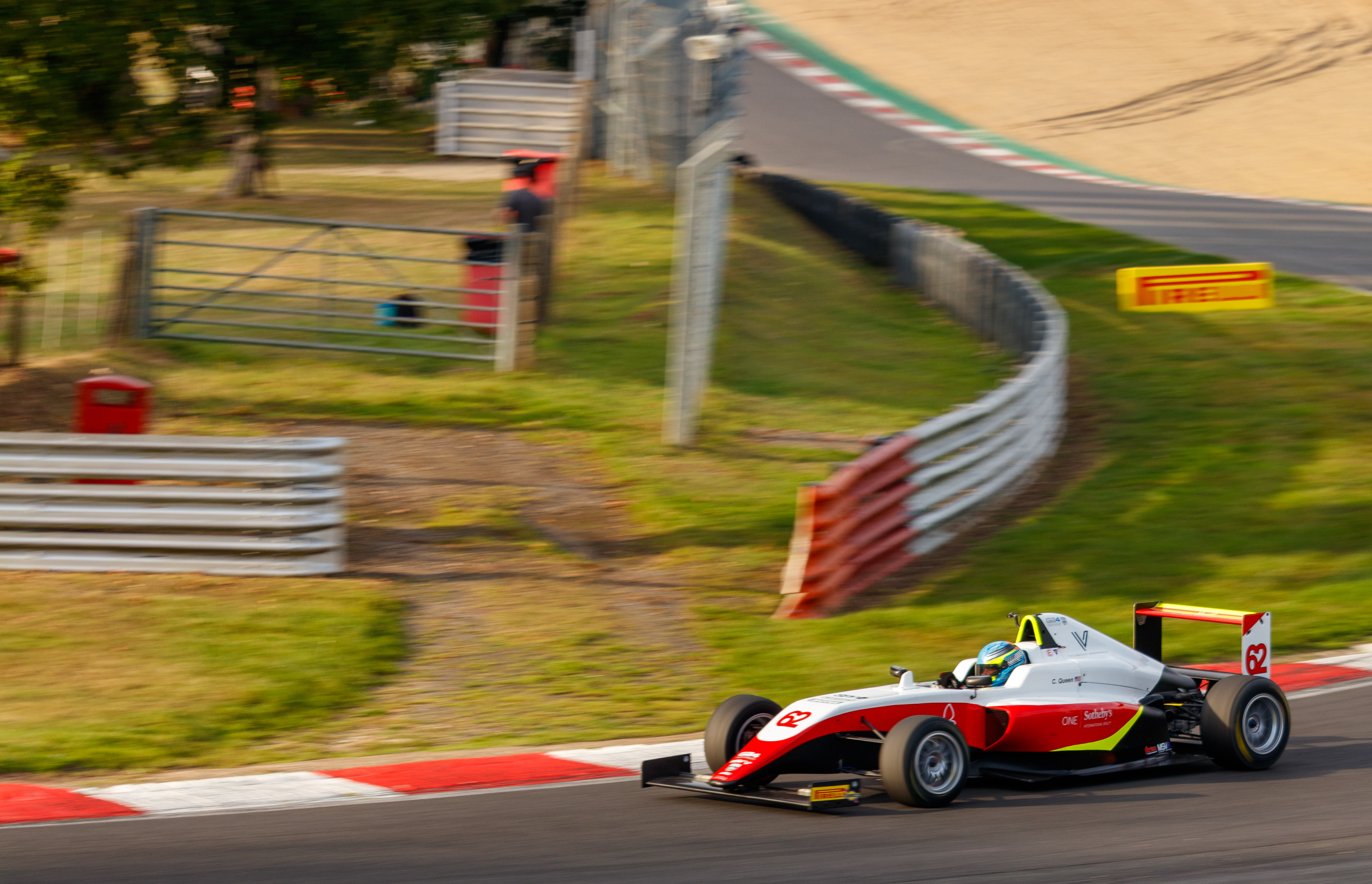
- Founded: 1989
- Base: Daventry, Northamptonshire, England
- Team principal(s): Richard Dutton
- Founder(s): Peter Ablewhite
- Current series: GB3 Championship; GB4 Championship; F4 British Championship
- Former series: International Formula 3000; Formula BMW UK; Formula BMW Europe; Formula Renault 2.0 Alps; Eurocup Formula Renault 2.0; Formula 3 Euro Series; Euro Formula 3000; British Formula 3 Formula Renault 2.0 UK; British GT Championship; Blancpain Endurance Series; Blancpain Sprint Series; FIA European F3; World Series Formula V8 3.5; Formula Renault 2.0 Northern European Cup; Eurocup Formula Renault 2.0; Euroformula Open Championship
- Current drivers: GB3 Championship; 23. (Japan) Alexandros Kattoulas; 24. (Australia) Jack Taylor; GB4 Championship; 8. (United Kingdom) Thomas Ingram Hill; 50. (Australia) Jack Taylor; 23. (Denmark) Luca Magnussen; F4 British Championship; 53. (United States) Ethan Carney; 11 (United States) Cash Felber; 73 (United States) Roman Felber; 9 (United Kingdom) Kit belofsky
- Teams' Championships: Formula BMW UK: 2005, 2006, 2007; British Formula Renault Championship: 2006, 2007, 2008, 2011; Formula Renault 2.0 Northern European Cup: 2012; Formula Renault 3.5 Series: 2015; F4 British Championship; 2021
- Drivers' Championships: British Formula Renault Championship: 2002: Danny Watts; 2004: Mike Conway; 2006: Sebastian Hohenthal; 2007: Duncan Tappy; Formula Renault UK Winter Series: 2004: Stuart Hall; Formula BMW UK: 2006: Niall Breen; 2007: Marcus Ericsson; Formula Renault 2.0 Northern European Cup: 2012: Jake Dennis; 2013: Matt Parry; 2014: Ben Barnicoat; Formula Renault 3.5 Series: 2012: Robin Frijns; 2015: Oliver Rowland; British Formula 3 Championship: 2009: Daniel McKenzie (National Class); 2014: Martin Cao; F4 British Championship; 2020: Luke Browning; GB4 Championship: 2022: Nikolas Taylor
- Website: http://fortecmotorsports.com/

Fortec Motorsport Ltd. is a motor-racing team that races in the GB3 Championship, GB4 Championship, and F4 British Championship. The team was bought in 1995 by current owner Richard Dutton.

Past drivers for the team include Juan Pablo Montoya, Gianmaria Bruni, Danny Watts, Jamie Green, James Rossiter, Mike Conway, Fabio Carbone and Heikki Kovalainen.

== History ==
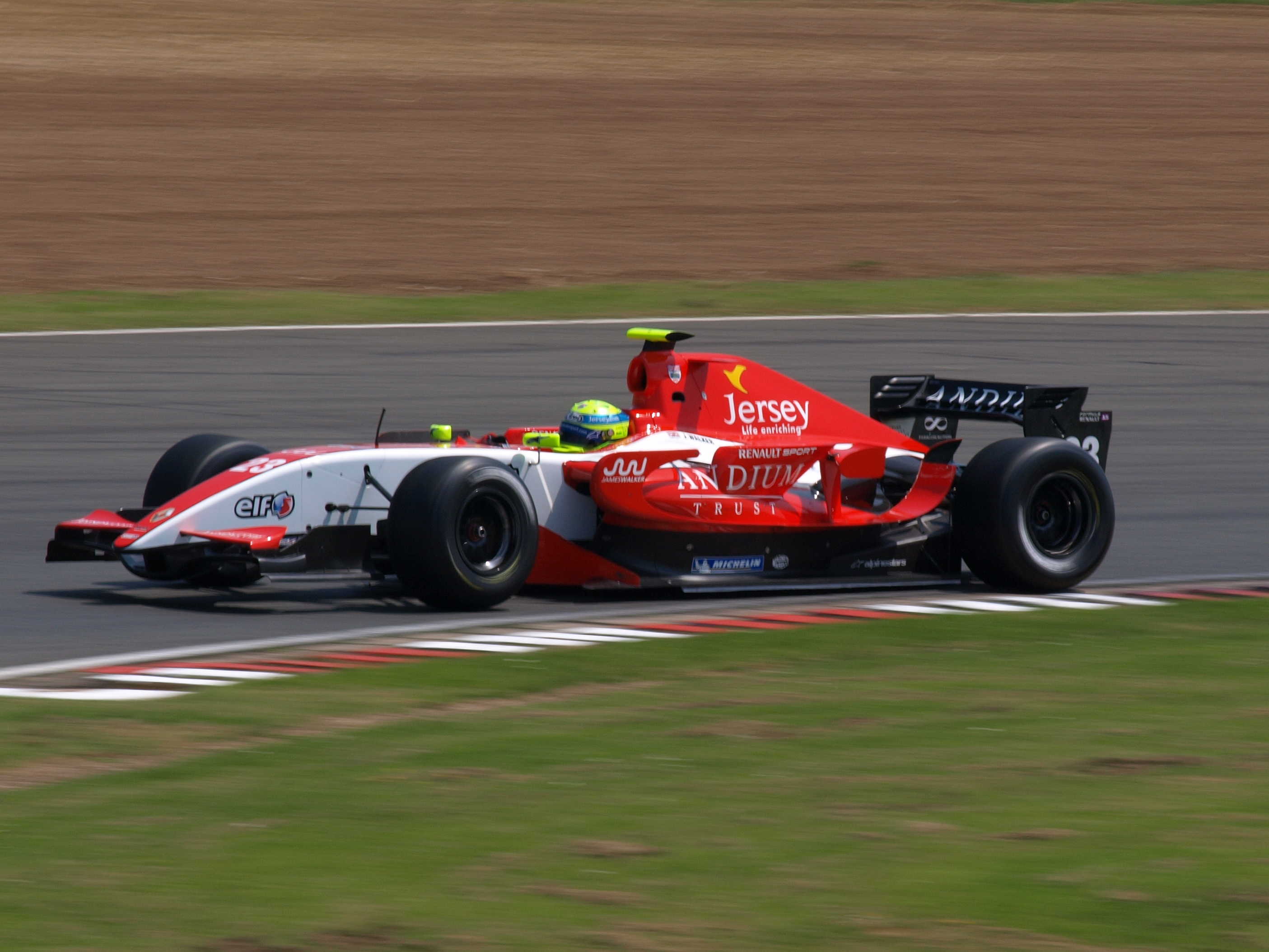
James Walker driving for Fortec at the Silverstone round of the 2008 World Series by Renault season.

The company was formed in Newark-on-Trent in 1989 by Peter Ablewhite, of Long Bennington, and mechanical engineer Peter Maxted of Brant Broughton. It moved to part of a 50-acre site at Gonerby Moor in 1995, nearby to the NAAFI distribution centre. The company left Grantham in 1999.

Fortec has enjoyed great success since its inception. In 2002 Danny Watts won the British Formula Renault Championship for the team, with team-mate Jamie Green following close behind in second. In the same year, Fabio Carbone won the prestigious Marlboro Masters Formula Three race, held at Zandvoort in the Netherlands. The team's next championship win came with another British Formula Renault title in 2004, with Mike Conway finishing over 90 points clear of his nearest rival, Comtec Racing's Westley Barber. Fortec added further team championships in the Formula BMW UK championship, taking three successive titles between 2005 and 2007, also taking drivers' championship titles with Niall Breen and Marcus Ericsson.

After a barren year for the team in Formula Renault in 2005, 2006 saw the team regain both championship titles, with Sebastian Hohenthal just clinching the drivers' title on countback, after he and Team A.K.A. driver Patrick Hogan ended the season on the same number of points. Duncan Tappy and Dean Smith finished in the top two placings in 2007. Another teams' title followed in 2008. More recently, the team has seen great improvements in its Formula Renault 3.5 Series results, finishing fifth in the Teams' Championship in 2009, fourth in 2010 and finishing as runners-up in 2011 season with driver Alexander Rossi finishing third overall and best rookie. In 2012 the team fielded rookies Robin Frijns from the Netherlands and Carlos Huertas from Colombia, Frijns won the driver championship in his first year scoring 3 wins during his championship season. Meanwhile, Huertas scored regular results and finished 16th in the season scoring 35 points, but Fortec finished 3rd in the teams championship behind Tech 1 Racing and New team Arden Caterham Motorsport.

Fortec were also crowned Team Champions in the Formula Renault 2.0 UK Championship with Alex Lynn clinching the drivers' title with a record-breaking twelve wins in one season. Oliver Rowland secured second in the Championship, as well as winning the Graduate Cup. William Buller was Fortec's top finisher in the British Formula 3 Championship, as he finished fourth in the Championship. In club-level racing, the new-for-2011 InterSteps Championship saw Jake Dennis win the Championship from teammate Alex Walker with Ed Jones finishing in fourth place, while in Formula Renault BARC, Josh Webster narrowly missed out on the drivers', after a close battle with eventual champion Dino Zamparelli.

After the Formula Renault UK was cancelled for the 2012 season, the team joined the Formula Renault 2.0 NEC.

== Current series results ==
=== BRDC British Formula 3 Championship / GB3 Championship ===
GB3 Championship results										
Year	Car	Drivers	Races	Wins	Poles	F.L.	Podiums	Points	D.C.	T.C.
2016	Tatuus-Cosworth F4-016	(India) Tarun Reddy	23	0	0	0	4	284	6th	N/A
2016	Tatuus-Cosworth F4-016	(Oman) Faisal Al Zubair	23	0	0	0	0	196	12th	N/A
2017	Tatuus-Cosworth F4-016	(United Kingdom) Ben Hingeley	24	3	1	1	7	444	3rd	N/A
2017	Tatuus-Cosworth F4-016	(Denmark) Nicolai Kjærgaard	24	0	0	0	0	247	10th	N/A
2017	Tatuus-Cosworth F4-016	(Venezuela) Manuel Maldonado	24	0	0	0	0	205	12th	N/A
2018	Tatuus-Cosworth F4-016	(United Kingdom) Tom Gamble	23	2	3	7	7	346	5th	N/A
2018	Tatuus-Cosworth F4-016	(Venezuela) Manuel Maldonado	23	2	0	0	2	292	7th	N/A
2018	Tatuus-Cosworth F4-016	(France) Tristan Charpentier	15	0	0	0	1	166	12th	N/A
2018	Tatuus-Cosworth F4-016	(Sweden) Hampus Ericsson	6	0	0	0	1	64	21st	N/A
2019	Tatuus-Cosworth F4-016	(United Kingdom) Johnathan Hoggard	24	7	7	9	12	482	2nd	N/A
2019	Tatuus-Cosworth F4-016	(Venezuela) Manuel Maldonado	24	1	0	1	5	348	6th	N/A
2019	Tatuus-Cosworth F4-016	(United States) Kris Wright	24	0	0	0	0	126	16th	N/A
2020	Tatuus-Cosworth F4-016	(Brazil) Roberto Faria	13	0	0	0	1	152	14th	N/A
2020	Tatuus-Cosworth F4-016	(United Kingdom) Jonny Wilkinson	3	0	0	0	0	20	23rd	N/A
2020	Tatuus-Cosworth F4-016	(United Kingdom) Frank Bird	3	0	0	0	0	13	24th	N/A
2021	Tatuus-Cosworth F4-016	(Brazil) Roberto Faria	24	1	0	3	9	360	5th	3rd
2021	Tatuus-Cosworth F4-016	(Denmark) Mikkel Grundtvig	24	2	0	0	4	214	13th	3rd
2021	Tatuus-Cosworth F4-016	(United Kingdom) Oliver Bearman	9	1	2	1	4	163	14th	3rd
2021	Tatuus-Cosworth F4-016	(United States) Hunter Yeany	3	0	0	0	1	36	24th	3rd
2021	Tatuus-Cosworth F4-016	(United Kingdom) Luke Browning	3	1	0	0	1	35	25th	3rd
2021	Tatuus-Cosworth F4-016	(Philippines) Eduardo Coseteng	3	0	0	0	0	13th	27th	3rd
2022	Tatuus-Cosworth MSV-022	(Sweden) Joel Granfors	24	2	3	0	11	460.5	2nd	4th
2022	Tatuus-Cosworth MSV-022	(United Kingdom) Zak Taylor†	24	0	0	0	1	154.5	18th	4th
2022	Tatuus-Cosworth MSV-022	(Denmark) Mikkel Grundtvig	18	2	0	0	3	135.5	21st	4th
2023	Tatuus-Cosworth MSV-022	(South Africa) Jarrod Waberski	22	0	0	0	1	239	9th	6th
2023	Tatuus-Cosworth MSV-022	(United States) Max Esterson	23	0	0	1	1	215	11th	6th
2023	Tatuus-Cosworth MSV-022	(United Kingdom) Edward Pearson	23	0	0	0	2	134	19th	6th
2024	Tatuus-Cosworth MSV-022	(United States) Colin Queen	23	0	0	0	0	178	14th	6th
2024	Tatuus-Cosworth MSV-022	(United Kingdom) Edward Pearson	17	0	0	0	0	87	20th	6th
2024	Tatuus-Cosworth MSV-022	(Australia) James Wharton	5	0	0	0	0	30	25th	6th
2024	Tatuus-Cosworth MSV-022	(Singapore) Alexandros Kattoulas	3	0	0	0	0	6	32nd	6th
2025	Tatuus-Cosworth MSV-025	(United Kingdom) Liam McNeilly	3	0	0	0	1	23	31st	9th
2025	Tatuus-Cosworth MSV-025	(Bulgaria) Stefan Bostandjiev	9	0	0	0	0	20	32nd	9th
2025	Tatuus-Cosworth MSV-025	(South Africa) Mika Abrahams	3	0	0	0	0	9	34th	9th
2026	Tatuus-Cosworth MSV-2026	(Australia) Jack Taylor	10	0	0	0	0	49	22nd	8th
2026	Tatuus-Cosworth MSV-2026	(Japan) Alex Kattoulas	3	0	0	0	0	33	26th	8th

† Taylor drove for Chris Dittmann Racing from round 7 onwards.

=== GB4 Championship ===
Year	Car	Drivers	Races	Wins	Poles	F/Laps	Podiums	Points	D.C.	T.C.
2022	Tatuus F4-T014	(United Kingdom) Nikolas Taylor	24	9	9	10	14	546	1st	N/A
2022	Tatuus F4-T014	(United Kingdom) Jessica Edgar	24	0	0	0	1	269	7th	N/A
2022	Tatuus F4-T014	(Sweden) Elias Adestam	9	0	0	0	1	151	11th	N/A
2022	Tatuus F4-T014	(Thailand) Carl Bennett	3	0	0	0	0	25	21st	N/A
2023	Tatuus F4-T014	(United States) Colin Queen	20	0	1	2	10	379	4th	2nd
2023	Tatuus F4-T014	(India) Aditya Kulkarni	20	0	0	0	4	256	5th	2nd
2023	Tatuus F4-T014	(India) Ruhaan Alva	14	0	0	0	1	165	10th	2nd
2023	Tatuus F4-T014	(United Kingdom) Dan Hickey	3	0	0	0	0	10	25th	2nd
2024	Tatuus F4-T014	(Sweden) Linus Granfors	20	6	6	3	10	467	1st	2nd
2024	Tatuus F4-T014	(Australia) Jack Taylor	20	0	0	0	1	202	9th	2nd
2024	Tatuus F4-T014	(United Kingdom) Dan Hickey	20	0	0	0	0	172	12th	2nd
2025	Tatuus MSV GB4-025	(United Kingdom) Thomas Ingram Hill	21	0	0	1	2	264	6th	3rd
2025	Tatuus MSV GB4-025	(Australia) Jack Taylor	21	2	2	3	4	219	10th	3rd
2025	Tatuus MSV GB4-025	(Denmark) Luca Magnussen	18	0	0	0	1	139	13th	3rd
2026	Tatuus MSV GB4-025	(United Kingdom) Thomas Ingram Hill	21	1	1	3	5	338	4th	3rd
2026	Tatuus MSV GB4-025	(Poland) Franciszek Cegielski	21	0	0	0	1	232	8th	3rd
2026	Tatuus MSV GB4-025	(United States) Jordyn Martin	21	0	0	0	0	93	18th	3rd

=== F4 British Championship ===
F4 British Championship Results
Year	Car	Drivers	Races	Wins	Poles	F/Laps	Podiums	Points	D.C.	T.C.
2015	Mygale M14-F4	(United Kingdom) Dan Ticktum	27	3	3	5	10	242	6th	4th
2015	Mygale M14-F4	(United Kingdom) James Pull	30	0	0	1	4	104	10th	4th
2015	Mygale M14-F4	(United Kingdom) Josh Smith	30	1	0	0	2	84	13th	4th
2015	Mygale M14-F4	(United Kingdom) Toby Sowery	15	0	0	0	1	80	14th	4th
2016	Mygale M14-F4	(United Kingdom) Alex Quinn	30	3	2	1	6	248	7th	4th
2016	Mygale M14-F4	(United Kingdom) Jamie Caroline	17	1	0	0	5	181	10th	4th
2016	Mygale M14-F4	(Denmark) Nicolai Kjærgaard	30	0	0	0	0	50	13th	4th
2016	Mygale M14-F4	(United Kingdom) Ross Martin	9	0	0	0	1	21	15th	4th
2016	Mygale M14-F4	(United Kingdom) Frank Bird	30	0	0	0	0	3	19th	4th
2017	Mygale M14-F4	(United Kingdom) Oliver York	30	2	1	0	9	274.5	6th	4th
2017	Mygale M14-F4	(Sweden) Hampus Ericsson	21	0	0	0	2	69	10th	4th
2017	Mygale M14-F4	(United Kingdom) Johnathan Hoggard	6	0	0	0	1	20	16th	4th
2017	Mygale M14-F4	(Mexico) Alexandra Mohnhaupt	3	0	0	0	0	0	24th	4th
2018	Mygale M14-F4	(United Kingdom) Johnathan Hoggard	30	8	6	2	10	339	3rd	4th
2018	Mygale M14-F4	(Sweden) Hampus Ericsson	21	0	0	0	0	54	11th	4th
2018	Mygale M14-F4	(Republic of Ireland) Lucca Allen	27	0	0	0	0	29	14th	4th
2019	Mygale M14-F4	(Brazil) Roberto Faria	30	0	0	0	0	99	11th	6th
2019	Mygale M14-F4	(Mexico) Mariano Martínez	30	0	0	0	0	49	12th	6th
2019	Mygale M14-F4	(United Kingdom) Chris Lulham	3	0	0	0	0	16	15th	6th
2020	Mygale M14-F4	(Brazil) Roberto Faria	15	0	1	0	2	106	10th	2nd
2020	Mygale M14-F4	(Mexico) Rafael Villagómez	17	0	0	0	1	47	11th	2nd
2020	Mygale M14-F4	(United Kingdom) Luke Browning	26	7	5	7	16	412.5	1st	2nd
2021	Mygale M14-F4	(Sweden) Joel Granfors	29	1	0	4	8	240	4th	1st
2021	Mygale M14-F4	(United Kingdom) James Hedley †	29	4	2	1	8	226	5th	1st
2021	Mygale M14-F4	(United Kingdom) Oliver Gray	27	2	2	1	2	173	7th	1st
2022	Tatuus F4-T421	(Australia) Marcos Flack	6	0	0	0	0	4	20th	7th
2022	Tatuus F4-T421	(United Kingdom) James Higgins	6	0	0	0	0	0	22nd	7th
2023	Tatuus F4-T421	(United Kingdom) James Higgins	30	2	4	0	6	217	6th	4th
2023	Tatuus F4-T421	(United Kingdom) Aiden Neate	13	0	0	0	3	91	14th	4th
2023	Tatuus F4-T421	(South Africa) Mika Abrahams	21	0	2	1	1	46	18th	4th
2024	Tatuus F4-T421	(India) Kai Daryanani	30	0	0	0	0	93	12th	6th
2024	Tatuus F4-T421	(Canada) Alexander Berg	30	1	0	0	1	60.5	14th	6th
2024	Tatuus F4-T421	(Netherlands) Nina Gademan	26	0	0	0	0	25	19th	6th
2025	Tatuus F4-T421	(United Kingdom) Henry Joslyn	30	0	5	1	7	153	9th	5th
2025	Tatuus F4-T421	(India) Ary Bansal	18	1	0	0	4	104	11th	5th
2025	Tatuus F4-T421	(United Kingdom) Thomas Ingram Hill	12	0	0	0	0	17	27th	5th
2026	Tatuus F4-T421	(United Kingdom) Kit Belofsky	18	0	0	0	1	58	15th	8th
2026	Tatuus F4-T421	(United States) Ethan Carney	30	0	0	0	1	53	17th	8th
2026	Tatuus F4-T421	(United States) Cash Felber	30	0	0	0	2	39	20th	8th
2026	Tatuus F4-T421	(United States) Roman Felber	29	0	0	0	0	16	28th	8th
2026	Tatuus F4-T421	(Indonesia) Qarrar Firhand‡	7	0	0	0	0	1	43rd	8th

† Hedley drove for Carlin from round 6 onwards. ‡ Firhand drove for Argenti in round 6.

== Former series results ==
=== British Formula 3 International Series ===
British Formula 3 results
Year	Car	Drivers	Races	Wins	Poles	F.L.	Podiums	Points	D.C.
1992	Reynard 923–Mugen-Honda	(United Kingdom) Kelvin Burt	16	2	0	2	7	55	3rd
1993	Reynard 933–Mugen-Honda	(Brazil) Andre Ribeiro	15	0	0	0	3	19	5th
1993	Reynard 933–Mugen-Honda	(United Kingdom) Gareth Rees	15	0	0	0	0	5	13th
1994	Dallara F394–Mugen-Honda	(France) Jérémie Dufour	19	0	0	6	3	103	7th
1994	Dallara F394–Mugen-Honda	(United Kingdom) Christian Horner	20	0	0	0	0	10	17th
1995	Dallara F395–Mitsubishi HKS	(United Kingdom) Jamie Davies	17	0	0	0	5	107	6th
1995	Dallara F395–Mitsubishi HKS	(Brazil) Gualter Salles	17	1	0	0	3	106	7th
1995	Dallara F395–Mitsubishi HKS	(United Kingdom) Jamie Spence	5	0	0	0	1	29	13th
1995	Dallara F395–Mitsubishi HKS	(Belgium) Geoffrey Horion	18	0	0	0	0	3	22nd
1996	Dallara F396–Mitsubishi HKS	(Colombia) Juan-Pablo Montoya	16	3	1	4	5	137	5th
1996	Dallara F396–Mitsubishi HKS	(United Kingdom) Guy Smith	16	1	2	0	5	132	6th
1997	Dallara F397–Mitsubishi HKS	(Argentina) Brian Smith	15	1	1	1	2	72	6th
1997	Dallara F397–Mitsubishi HKS	(United Kingdom) Ben Collins	16	0	0	0	1	64	7th
1998	Dallara F398–Mugen-Honda	(Denmark) Kristian Kolby	16	0	0	2	1	82	6th
1998	Dallara F398–Mugen-Honda	(United Kingdom) Andrej Pavicevic	16	0	0	0	0	19	14th
1999	Dallara F399–Mugen-Honda	(Denmark) Kristian Kolby	16	1	0	2	6	153	6th
1999	Dallara F399–Mugen-Honda	(United Kingdom) Matt Davies	16	0	0	0	4	113	14th
2000	Dallara F300–Mugen-Honda	(Italy) Gianmaria Bruni	14	0	0	0	2	95	5th
2000	Dallara F300–Mugen-Honda	(United Kingdom) Michael Bentwood	14	0	0	0	2	69	7th
2001	Dallara F301–Renault	(Italy) Gianmaria Bruni	26	1	0	1	7	156	5th
2001	Dallara F301–Renault	(United States) Alex Gurney	24	0	0	0	0	17	16th
2002	Dallara F302–Renault	(Finland) Heikki Kovalainen	25	5	2	2	12	257	3rd
2002	Dallara F302–Renault	(Brazil) Fabio Carbone	25	0	1	1	4	137	6th
2003	Dallara F303–Renault Sodemo	(Sweden) Robert Dahlgren	24	1	0	1	3	102	9th
2003	Dallara F303–Renault Sodemo	(Australia) Will Power	18	0	0	0	1	40	14th
2004	Dallara F304–Opel	(United Kingdom) James Rossiter	24	3	3	2	12	228	3rd
2004	Dallara F304–Opel	(Australia) Marcus Marshall	22	1	0	0	1	24	17th
2004	Dallara F304–Opel	(Republic of Ireland) Ronayne O'Mahony	2	0	0	0	0	0	NC
2005	Dallara F305–Mercedes HWA	(United Kingdom) Mike Conway	1	1	0	0	7	192	3rd
2005	Dallara F305–Mercedes HWA	(United Kingdom) James Walker	22	1	0	1	1	69	11th
2005	Dallara F305–Mercedes HWA	(Republic of Ireland) Ronayne O'Mahony	20	0	0	0	0	21	14th
2005	Dallara F305–Mercedes HWA	(Netherlands) Yelmer Buurman	2	0	0	0	0	0	NC
2006	Dallara F306–Mercedes	(Netherlands) Yelmer Buurman	22	2	0	0	5	186	4th
2006	Dallara F306–Mercedes	(United Kingdom) Stuart Hall	19	0	0	0	0	21	13th
2006	Dallara F306–Mercedes	(United Kingdom) Charlie Hollings	7	0	0	0	0	6	16th
2007	Dallara F307–Mercedes	(Sweden) Sebastian Hohental	22	1	0	0	4	101	9th
2007	Dallara F307–Mercedes	(United Kingdom) Greg Mansell	22	0	0	0	3	79	10th
2007	Dallara F307–Mercedes	(United Kingdom) Leo Mansell	21	0	0	0	0	2	17th
2008	Dallara F308–Mercedes	(Sweden) Marcus Ericsson	22	0	2	4	5	141	5th
2008	Dallara F308–Mercedes	(Sweden) Sebastian Hohental	16	1	0	0	4	105	7th
2008	Dallara F308–Mercedes	(United Kingdom) Dean Smith	2	0	0	0	0	20	16th
2008	Dallara F308–Mercedes	(Canada) Philip Major	8	0	0	0	0	0	18th
2009	Dallara F309–Mercedes	(United Kingdom) Riki Christodolou	20	1	0	0	4	130	5th
2009	Dallara F309–Mercedes	(Spain) Víctor García	20	0	0	0	0	30	14th
2009	Dallara F309–Mercedes	(United Kingdom) Daniel McKenzie	20	11	5	11	19	351	1st [B]
2010	Dallara F309–Mercedes	(United Kingdom) Oliver Webb	30	3	4	4	13	250	3rd
2010	Dallara F309–Mercedes	(United Kingdom) Daniel McKenzie	30	2	1	1	4	109	9th
2010	Dallara F309–Mercedes	(Russia) Max Snegirev	30	0	0	0	0	1	18th
2011	Dallara F311–Mercedes	(United Kingdom) William Buller	30	1	2	4	9	197	4th
2011	Dallara F311–Mercedes	(Brazil) Lucas Foresti	30	3	1	2	6	109	7th
2011	Dallara F311–Mercedes	(United Kingdom) Harry Tincknell	30	1	0	0	4	78	11th
2011	Dallara F311–Mercedes	(Malaysia) Fahmi Ilyas	30	0	0	0	0	7	21st
2012	Dallara F312–Mercedes	(Puerto Rico) Félix Serrallés	28	4	3	5	12	299	3rd
2012	Dallara F312–Mercedes	(United Kingdom) Alex Lynn	28	1	2	5	9	253	4th
2012	Dallara F312–Mercedes	(Brazil) Pipo Derani	28	2	0	2	4	146	8th
2012	Dallara F312–Mercedes	(Netherlands) Hannes van Asseldonk	27	0	0	3	0	132	9th
2013	Dallara F312–Mercedes	(United Kingdom) William Buller	12	1	0	7	6	134	3rd
2013	Dallara F312–Mercedes	(Brazil) Felipe Guimarães	12	2	0	1	4	109	4th
2013	Dallara F312–Mercedes	(Puerto Rico) Félix Serrallés	3	0	0	0	0	15	10th
2013	Dallara F312–Mercedes	(Mexico) Alfonso Celis Jr.	3	0	0	0	0	15	11th
2014	Dallara F312–Mercedes	(China) Martin Cao	21	4	4	1	16	285	1st
2014	Dallara F312–Mercedes	(United Kingdom) Matt Rao	21	5	3	9	15	283	2nd
2014	Dallara F312–Mercedes	(United Kingdom) Sam MacLeod	9	2	3	4	6	121	4th
2014	Dallara F312–Mercedes	(Germany) Marvin Kirchhöfer	3	2	0	2	3	54	8th

=== Formula Renault 3.5 Series ===
Formula Renault 3.5 results
Year	Car	Drivers	Races	Wins	Poles	F.L.	Podiums	Points	D.C.	T.C.
2007	Dallara T05–Renault	(United Kingdom) James Walker	17	1	0	0	1	19	19th	12th
2007	Dallara T05–Renault	(Netherlands) Yelmer Buurman	4	0	0	0	0	15	20th	12th
2007	Dallara T05–Renault	(France) Richard Philippe	11	0	0	0	0	0	33rd	12th
2007	Dallara T05–Renault	(Argentina) Esteban Guerrieri	2	0	0	0	0	0	39th	12th
2008	Dallara T05–Renault	(United Kingdom) James Walker	17	0	0	0	1	36	13th	9th
2008	Dallara T05–Renault	(Malaysia) Fairuz Fauzy	13	0	0	0	1	17	18th	9th
2008	Dallara T05–Renault	(Germany) Julian Theobald	4	0	0	0	0	0	33rd	9th
2009	Dallara T08–Renault	(Malaysia) Fairuz Fauzy	17	1	1	1	5	98	2nd	5th
2009	Dallara T08–Renault	(Estonia) Sten Pentus	13	0	0	0	1	23	16th	5th
2010	Dallara T08–Renault	(Estonia) Sten Pentus	17	2	1	2	4	78	4th	4th
2010	Dallara T08–Renault	(United Kingdom) Jon Lancaster	17	0	0	0	1	39	13th	4th
2011	Dallara T08–Renault	(United States) Alexander Rossi	17	3	0	2	6	39	3rd	2nd
2011	Dallara T08–Renault	(Brazil) César Ramos	17	0	2	0	0	47	11th	2nd
2012	Dallara T12–Zytek	(Netherlands) Robin Frijns	17	3	4	1	8	189	1st	3rd
2012	Dallara T12–Zytek	(Colombia) Carlos Huertas	17	0	0	0	0	35	16th	3rd
2013	Dallara T12–Zytek	(Belgium) Stoffel Vandoorne	17	4	3	2	10	214	2nd	2nd
2013	Dallara T12–Zytek	(United Kingdom) Oliver Webb	17	0	0	0	0	27	14th	2nd
2014	Dallara T12–Zytek	(United Kingdom) Oliver Rowland	17	2	3	1	7	181	4th	2nd
2014	Dallara T12–Zytek	(Russia) Sergey Sirotkin	17	1	1	0	4	132	5th	2nd
2015	Dallara T12–Zytek	(United Kingdom) Oliver Rowland	17	8	7	4	13	307	1st	1st
2015	Dallara T12–Zytek	(Malaysia) Jazeman Jaafar	17	1	1	1	4	118	8th	1st

=== Formula V8 3.5 Series ===
Formula V8 3.5 results
Year	Car	Drivers	Races	Wins	Poles	F.L.	Podiums	Points	D.C.	T.C.
2016	Dallara T12–Zytek	(Switzerland) Louis Delétraz	18	2	3	5	9	230	2nd	4th
2016	Dallara T12–Zytek	(Brazil) Pietro Fittipaldi	18	0	0	0	1	60	10th	4th
2017	Dallara T12–Zytek	(Mexico) Alfonso Celis Jr.	6	1	1	1	3	75	4th	3rd
2017	Dallara T12–Zytek	(Mexico) Diego Menchaca	6	0	0	0	0	36	7th	3rd

=== FIA European Formula 3 Championship ===
FIA European Formula 3 Championship results
Year	Car	Drivers	Races	Wins	Poles	F.L.	Podiums	Points	T.C.	D.C.
2013	Dallara F312–Mercedes	(Brazil) Luis Felipe Derani	30	0	0	0	3	143	4th	8th
2013	Dallara F312–Mercedes	(United States) Félix Serrallés	29	0	0	1	2	104	4th	11th
2013	Dallara F312–Mercedes	(United Kingdom) Josh Hill	15	0	0	0	1	56	4th	12th
2013	Dallara F312–Mercedes	(Sweden) John Bryant-Meisner	6	0	0	0	0	2	4th	25th
2013	Dallara F312–Mercedes	(Russia) Dmitry Suranovich	3	0	0	0	0	0	4th	33rd
2013	Dallara F312–Mercedes	(Mexico) Alfonso Celis Jr.	3	0	0	0	0	0	4th	34th
2013	Dallara F312–Mercedes	(United Arab Emirates) Ed Jones	3	0	0	0	0	0	4th	NC
2014	Dallara F312–Mercedes	(Australia) Mitch Gilbert	0	0	0	0	0	28	7th	16th
2014	Dallara F312–Mercedes	(Mexico) Alfonso Celis Jr.		0	0	0	0	0	7th	29th
2014	Dallara F312–Mercedes	(China) Hongwei Cao	0	0	0	0	0	0	7th	n/a
2014	Dallara F312–Mercedes	(Sweden) John Bryant-Meisner	0	0	0	0	0	6	7th	21st
2014	Dallara F312–Mercedes	(United States) Santino Ferrucci	0	0	0	0	0	24	7th	19th
2015	Dallara F315–Mercedes	(Brazil) Pietro Fittipaldi	0	0	0	0	0	32	8th	17th
2015	Dallara F312–Mercedes	(United Kingdom) Matt Rao	0	0	0	0	0	0	8th	29th
2015	Dallara F312–Mercedes	(China) Hongwei Cao	0	0	0	0	0	0	8th	30th
2015	Dallara F312–Mercedes	(Macau) Wing Chung Chang	0	0	0	0	0	0	8th	36th
2015	Dallara F312–Mercedes	(China) Zhi Cong Li	0	0	0	0	0	0	8th	37th

=== Eurocup Formula Renault 2.0 ===
Eurocup Formula Renault 2.0 results
Year	Car	Drivers	Races	Wins	Poles	F.L.	Podiums	Points	D.C.	T.C.
2008	Tatuus–Renault	(United Kingdom) Alex Morgan	12	0	0	0	1	17	14th	12th
2008	Tatuus–Renault	(United Kingdom) Dean Smith	14	0	0	0	0	11	17th	12th
2008	Tatuus–Renault	(Brazil) Gabriel Dias	14	0	0	0	0	3	24th	12th
2008	Tatuus–Renault	(United Kingdom) Daniel McKenzie	12	0	0	0	0	0	NC	12th
2009	Tatuus–Renault	(United Kingdom) James Calado	6	0	0	0	0	10	17th	8th
2009	Tatuus–Renault	(United Kingdom) Oliver Webb	4	0	0	0	0	0	29th	8th
2009	Tatuus–Renault	(Sweden) Kevin Kleveros	12	0	0	0	0	0	30th	8th
2009	Tatuus–Renault	(United Kingdom) Will Stevens	4	0	0	0	0	0	34th	8th
2009	Tatuus–Renault	(Sweden) Frederik Blomstedt	2	0	0	0	0	0	41st	8th
2011	Tatuus–Renault	(United Kingdom) Will Stevens	14	1	3	0	4	116	4th	3rd
2011	Tatuus–Renault	(Puerto Rico) Félix Serrallés	14	0	0	0	0	41	12th	3rd
2011	Tatuus–Renault	(United Kingdom) Alex Lynn	4	0	1	0	1	26	14th	3rd
2011	Tatuus–Renault	(United Kingdom) Mitchell Gilbert	6	0	0	0	0	0	30th	3rd
2011	Tatuus–Renault	(United Arab Emirates) Ed Jones	6	0	0	0	0	0	NC	3rd
2011	Tatuus–Renault	(Malaysia) Fahmi Elyas	2	0	0	0	0	0	NC	3rd
2012	Tatuus–Renault	(United Kingdom) Oliver Rowland	14	1	0	0	3	109	3rd	3rd
2012	Tatuus–Renault	(United Kingdom) Jake Dennis	6	0	0	0	1	31	12th	3rd
2012	Tatuus–Renault	(Finland) Mikko Pakari	14	0	0	0	1	30	15th	3rd
2012	Tatuus–Renault	(United Kingdom) Ed Jones	14	0	0	0	0	2	27th	3rd
2012	Tatuus–Renault	(New Zealand) Nick Cassidy	6	0	0	0	0	8	24th	3rd
2012	Tatuus–Renault	(United Kingdom) Josh Hill	2	0	0	0	0	8	25th	3rd
2012	Tatuus–Renault	(Russia) Aleksey Chuklin	2	0	0	0	0	0	NC	3rd
2012	Tatuus–Renault	(Netherlands) Steijn Schothorst	2	0	0	0	0	0	NC	3rd
2012	Tatuus–Renault	(United States) Gustavo Menezes	2	0	0	0	0	0	NC	3rd
2012	Tatuus–Renault	(Russia) Egor Orudzhev	2	0	0	0	0	0	NC	3rd
2012	Tatuus–Renault	(United Kingdom) Dan De Zille	2	0	0	0	0	0	NC	3rd
2013	Tatuus–Renault	(United Kingdom) Jake Dennis	14	0	1	1	1	130	4th	3rd
2013	Tatuus–Renault	(United Arab Emirates) Ed Jones	12	0	0	0	2	45	11th	3rd
2013	Tatuus–Renault	(Finland) Mikko Pakari	14	0	0	0	0	17	17th	3rd
2013	Tatuus–Renault	(United Kingdom) Matt Parry	2	0	0	0	0	0	NC	3rd
2013	Tatuus–Renault	(United Kingdom) Jack Aitken	2	0	0	0	0	0	NC	3rd
2013	Tatuus–Renault	(United States) Ryan Tveter	2	0	0	0	0	0	NC	3rd
2014	Tatuus–Renault	(United Kingdom) Jack Aitken	14	1	1	0	4	86	7th	3rd
2014	Tatuus–Renault	(United Kingdom) Matt Parry	14	0	0	0	1	57	11th	3rd
2014	Tatuus–Renault	(Estonia) Martin Rump	14	0	0	0	0	8	20th	3rd
2014	Tatuus–Renault	(Monaco) Charles Leclerc	6	0	0	0	3	0	NC	3rd
2014	Tatuus–Renault	(United Kingdom) Ben Barnicoat	2	0	0	0	0	0	NC	3rd
2014	Tatuus–Renault	(Brazil) Thiago Vivacqua	2	0	0	0	0	0	NC	3rd
2015	Tatuus–Renault	(United Kingdom) Ben Barnicoat	17	3	1	1	6	174	4th	3rd
2015	Tatuus–Renault	(Croatia) Martin Kodrić	17	0	0	1	1	47	11th	3rd
2015	Tatuus–Renault	(South Africa) Callan O'Keeffe	12	0	0	0	0	31	14th	3rd
2015	Tatuus–Renault	(France) Valentin Hasse-Clot	17	0	0	0	0	2	19th	3rd
2015	Tatuus–Renault	(Canada) Luke Chudleigh	5	0	0	0	0	0	23rd	3rd
2015	Tatuus–Renault	(Canada) Zachary Claman DeMelo	3	0	0	0	0	0	NC	3rd
2015	Tatuus–Renault	(India) Jehan Daruvala	8	0	0	0	0	0	NC	3rd
2015	Tatuus–Renault	(Austria) Ferdinand Habsburg	5	0	0	0	0	0	NC	3rd
2016	Tatuus–Renault	(Austria) Ferdinand Habsburg	15	0	0	0	2	57	10th	5th
2016	Tatuus–Renault	(Brazil) Bruno Baptista	15	0	0	0	0	28	14th	5th
2016	Tatuus–Renault	(Russia) Vasily Romanov	9	0	0	0	0	2	18th	5th
2016	Tatuus–Renault	(Russia) Aleksandr Vartanyan	2	0	0	0	0	0	NC	5th
2016	Tatuus–Renault	(Russia) Nikita Troitskiy	12	0	0	0	0	0	NC	5th
2016	Tatuus–Renault	(United Kingdom) Frank Bird	2	0	0	0	0	0	NC	5th
2017	Tatuus–Renault	(Australia) Alex Peroni	23	1	1	0	1	67	10th	5th
2017	Tatuus–Renault	(Russia) Aleksey Korneev	23	0	0	0	0	8	18th	5th
2017	Tatuus–Renault	(Malaysia) Najiy Razak	23	0	0	0	0	1	22nd	5th
2017	Tatuus–Renault	(United Kingdom) Frank Bird	23	0	0	0	0	0	32nd	5th
2018	Tatuus–Renault	(Russia) Vladimiros Tziortzis	18	0	0	0	0	0	27th	7th
2018	Tatuus–Renault	(Mexico) Raúl Guzmán	20	0	0	0	0	4	21st	7th
2018	Tatuus–Renault	(Brazil) Christian Hahn	6	0	0	0	0	0	31st	7th
2018	Tatuus–Renault	(France) Arthur Rougier	18	0	0	0	0	26	15th	7th

=== Formula Renault 2.0 Northern European Cup ===
Formula Renault 2.0 Northern European Cup results
Year	Car	Drivers	Races	Wins	Poles	F.L.	Podiums	Points	D.C.	T.C.
2011	Barazi-Epsilon–Renault	(Puerto Rico) Félix Serrallés	2	0	0	0	0	0	NC	NC
2011	Barazi-Epsilon–Renault	(United Kingdom) Will Stevens	2	0	0	0	2	0	NC	NC
2011	Barazi-Epsilon–Renault	(Malaysia) Fahmi Ilyas	2	0	0	0	0	0	NC	NC
2012	Barazi-Epsilon–Renault	(United Kingdom) Jake Dennis	20	3	3	2	11	376	1st	1st
2012	Barazi-Epsilon–Renault	(United Kingdom) Josh Hill	20	5	1	3	7	311	3rd	1st
2012	Barazi-Epsilon–Renault	(India) Shahaan Engineer	20	0	2	0	2	195	7th	1st
2012	Barazi-Epsilon–Renault	(United Arab Emirates) Ed Jones	12	0	0	0	0	85	21st	1st
2012	Barazi-Epsilon–Renault	(Finland) Mikko Pakari	12	0	2	1	0	75	24th	1st
2012	Barazi-Epsilon–Renault	(United Kingdom) Dan de Zille	20	0	0	0	0	63	26th	1st
2012	Barazi-Epsilon–Renault	(United Kingdom) Seb Morris	2	0	0	0	0	10	43rd	1st
2013	Barazi-Epsilon–Renault	(United Kingdom) Matt Parry	17	5	3	3	9	289	1st	N/A
2013	Barazi-Epsilon–Renault	(United Kingdom) Jack Aitken	17	0	2	1	5	230	2nd	N/A
2013	Barazi-Epsilon–Renault	(Finland) Mikko Pakari	7	0	0	0	2	125	10th	N/A
2013	Barazi-Epsilon–Renault	(India) Shahaan Engineer	5	0	0	0	0	56	23rd	N/A
2013	Barazi-Epsilon–Renault	(Indonesia) Philo Paz Armand	17	0	0	0	0	45	28th	N/A
2013	Barazi-Epsilon–Renault	(United Arab Emirates) Ed Jones	5	0	0	0	0	43	29th	N/A
2013	Barazi-Epsilon–Renault	(United Kingdom) Sam MacLeod	7	0	0	0	0	43	30th	N/A
2013	Barazi-Epsilon–Renault	(United Kingdom) Jake Dennis	5	1	0	0	1	42	31st	N/A
2014	Barazi-Epsilon–Renault	(United Kingdom) Ben Barnicoat	15	2	1	1	5	258	1st	2nd
2014	Barazi-Epsilon–Renault	(United Kingdom) Seb Morris	15	2	3	1	5	224	3rd	2nd
2014	Barazi-Epsilon–Renault	(Croatia) Martin Kodrić	15	0	0	0	0	80	18th	2nd
2014	Barazi-Epsilon–Renault	(Mexico) Jorge Cevallos	7	0	0	0	0	32	25th	2nd
2015	Barazi-Epsilon–Renault	(India) Jehan Daruvala	15	0	0	1	3	194.5	5th	3rd
2015	Barazi-Epsilon–Renault	(South Africa) Callan O'Keeffe	11	0	0	0	3	168.5	7th	3rd
2015	Barazi-Epsilon–Renault	(United Kingdom) Alex Gill	15	0	0	0	1	145.5	8th	3rd
2015	Barazi-Epsilon–Renault	(Republic of Ireland) Charlie Eastwood	11	0	0	0	0	76	17th	3rd
2015	Barazi-Epsilon–Renault	(Austria) Stefan Riener	7	0	0	0	0	73	18th	3rd
2015	Barazi-Epsilon–Renault	(Austria) Ferdinand Habsburg	11	0	0	0	0	62	19th	3rd
2015	Barazi-Epsilon–Renault	(Canada) Zachary Claman DeMelo	4	0	0	0	0	22	30th	3rd
2015	Barazi-Epsilon–Renault	(Canada) Luke Chudleigh	4	0	0	0	0	13	35th	3rd
2016	Barazi-Epsilon–Renault	(Austria) Ferdinand Habsburg	10	0	0	0	2	130	11th	4th
2016	Barazi-Epsilon–Renault	(Russia) Nikita Troitskiy	12	0	0	0	1	116	14th	4th
2016	Barazi-Epsilon–Renault	(Russia) Vasily Romanov	10	0	0	0	1	105	16th	4th
2016	Barazi-Epsilon–Renault	(Brazil) Bruno Baptista	15	0	0	0	0	97	17th	4th
2016	Barazi-Epsilon–Renault	(Russia) Aleksandr Vartanyan	5	0	0	0	0	40	22nd	4th
2017	Barazi-Epsilon–Renault	(United Kingdom) Frank Bird	5	0	0	0	0	26	20th	8th
2017	Barazi-Epsilon–Renault	(Malaysia) Chia Wing Hoong	2	0	0	0	0	22	24th	8th
2017	Barazi-Epsilon–Renault	(Australia) Alex Peroni	3	0	0	0	0	0	NC	8th
2017	Barazi-Epsilon–Renault	(Russia) Aleksey Korneev	3	0	0	0	0	0	NC	8th
2017	Barazi-Epsilon–Renault	(Malaysia) Najiy Razak	3	0	0	0	0	0	NC	8th
2018	Barazi-Epsilon–Renault	(Russia) Vladimiros Tziortzis	6	0	0	0	0	0	NC	N/A
2018	Barazi-Epsilon–Renault	(Mexico) Raúl Guzmán	8	0	0	0	0	0	NC	N/A
2018	Barazi-Epsilon–Renault	(France) Arthur Rougier	10	0	0	0	0	26	14th	N/A

=== Euroformula Open Championship ===
Euroformula Open Championship results
Year	Car	Driver	Races	Wins	Poles	F/Laps	Podiums	Points	D.C.	T.C.
2016	Dallara F312-Toyota	(Poland) Igor Waliłko	8	0	0	0	0	50	10th	5th
2016	Dallara F312-Toyota	(United Kingdom) Sam MacLeod	2	0	0	0	0	8	19th	5th
2017	Dallara F312-Toyota	(Germany) Jannes Fittje	10	0	0	0	2	159	5th†	5th
2017	Dallara F312-Toyota	(Russia) Yan Leon Shlom	4	0	0	0	0	0	23rd	5th
2017	Dallara F312-Toyota	(United Kingdom) Ben Hingeley	8	0	0	0	0	44	11th	5th
2017	Dallara F312-Toyota	(Malaysia) Najiy Razak	2	0	0	0	0	0	21st	5th
2017	Dallara F312-Toyota	(Romania) Petru Florescu	10	0	0	0	0	45	10th†	5th
2017	Dallara F312-Toyota	(Ukraine) Aleksey Chuklin	4	0	0	0	0	1	21st	5th
2018	Dallara F312-Toyota	(Romania) Petru Florescu	2	0	1	0	0	21	13th†	6th
2018	Dallara F312-Toyota	(Mexico) Raúl Guzmán	2	0	0	0	0	0	21st	6th
2018	Dallara F312-Toyota	(Italy) Aldo Festante	4	0	0	0	0	29	9th†	6th
2018	Dallara F312-Toyota	(Australia) Calan Williams	12	0	0	0	0	25	11th	6th
2019	Dallara F317-Mercedes-Benz	(United States) Cameron Das	8	0	0	0	0	54	12th†	5th
2019	Dallara F317-Mercedes-Benz	(Venezuela) Manuel Maldonado	4	0	0	0	0	0	14th	5th
2019	Dallara F317-Mercedes-Benz	(Australia) Calan Williams	18	0	0	0	0	53	13th	5th

† Includes points scored for other teams

=== Italian F4 Championship ===
Year	Car	Drivers	Races	Wins	Poles	F/Laps	Podiums	Points	D.C.	T.C.
2014	Tatuus F4-T014	(Italy) Leonardo Pulcini	21	0	0	0	6	187‡	4th‡	2nd
2014	Tatuus F4-T014	(Italy) Andrea Fontana	18	1	0	1	3	116	6th	2nd
2014	Tatuus F4-T014	(Japan) Ukyo Sasahara	3	1	0	0	1	25	17th	2nd
2014	Tatuus F4-T014	(Japan) Shinji Sawada	3	0	0	0	0	2	22nd	2nd
2014	Tatuus F4-T014	(United Kingdom) Sennan Fielding	6	1	0	0	3	69†	4th†	2nd

† Italian F4 Trophy

‡ Shared results with other teams

== Timeline ==
Current series
F4 British Championship	2015–present
GB3 Championship	2016–present
GB4 Championship	2022–present
Former series
British Formula 3 Championship	1992–2014
International Formula 3000	1999–2000
British Formula Renault Championship	1999–2011
Euro Formula 3000	2001
Eurocup Formula Renault 2.0	2002–2004, 2008–2009, 2011–2018
Formula BMW UK	2004–2007
Formula 3 Euro Series	2006, 2012
Formula Renault 3.5 Series	2007–2017
Formula BMW Europe	2008–2010
Formula Renault BARC	2010–2012
Formula Abarth	2011–2013
Formula Renault 2.0 Northern European Cup	2011–2018
Italian Formula Three Championship	2012
Formula Renault 2.0 Alps	2012, 2014–2015
FIA Formula 3 European Championship	2012–2015
FIA GT Series	2013
Blancpain Endurance Series	2013
British GT Championship	2013
Protyre Formula Renault	2013–2014
Blancpain Sprint Series	2014
Italian F4 Championship	2014
Euroformula Open Championship	2016–2019

Achievements
Preceded by Koiranen GP	Formula Renault 2.0 NEC Teams' Champion; 2012	Succeeded by Josef Kaufmann Racing
Preceded by DAMS	Formula Renault 3.5 Series Teams' Champion; 2015	Succeeded by Incumbent
