= Stefan Bostandjiev =

Bulgarian racing driver (born 2004)

- Стефан Бостанджиев
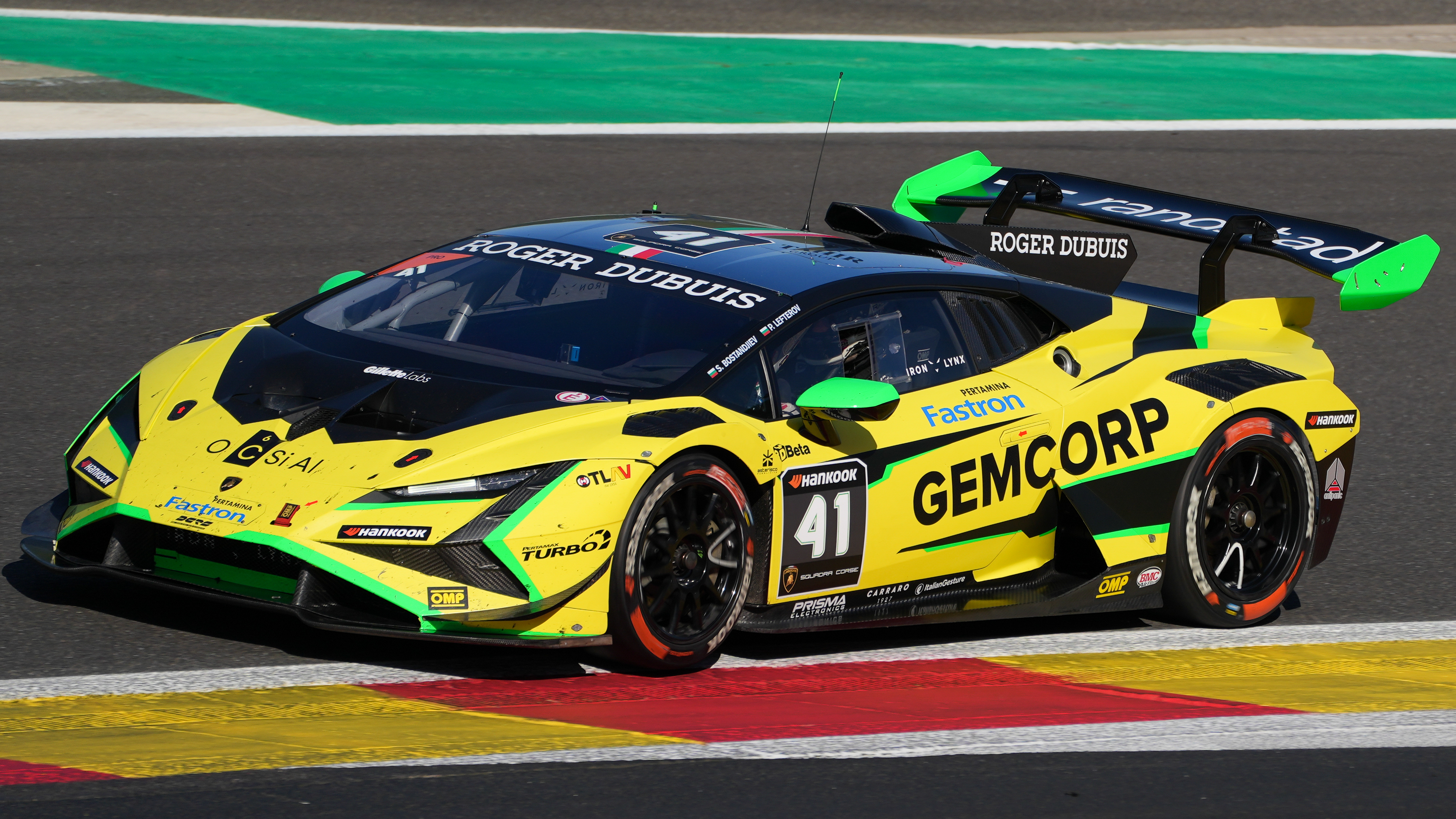
- Bostandjiev driving the Lamborghini Huracán Super Trofeo Evo during the 2024 Lamborghini Super Trofeo Europe
- Born: 23 May 2004 (age 22); London, England
- Nationality: (Bulgaria) Bulgarian; (United Kingdom) British; via dual nationality

Eurocup-3 career
- Debut season: 2026
- Current team: Hitech
- Categorisation: FIA Bronze (2021); FIA Silver (2022–)
- Car number: 23
- Starts: 18
- Wins: 0
- Podiums: 0
- Poles: 0
- Fastest laps: 0
- Best finish: 24th in 2026

Previous series
- 2026; 2025; 2025; 2024; 2023; 2021–2023: Eurocup-3 Spanish Winter; GB3; GB4; Lamborghini Super Trofeo Europe; GT4 European; ADAC GT4

Stefan Bostandjiev (Bulgarian: Стефан Бостанджиев; born 23 May 2004) is a Bulgarian and British racing driver who last competed in the Eurocup-3 for Hitech TGR.

Born in London to a Bulgarian family, Bostandjiev debuted in sportscar racing in 2021, contesting ADAC GT4 Germany until 2023. He moved to the Lamborghini Super Trofeo Europe in 2024 with Iron Lynx. A switch to junior formulae in 2025 saw him debut in both the GB4 and GB3 Championships.

== Career ==
In 2021, Bostandjiev joined Overdrive Racing to make his debut in ADAC GT4 Germany alongside Pavel Lefterov. In his maiden season in cars, he scored his first podium by finishing third at the Hockenheimring, and then rounded out the season with second- and seventh-place finishes at the Nürburgring, on his way to sixth overall and runner-up in the junior standings.

In 2022, Bostandjiev returned to Overdrive Racing for his sophomore season in ADAC GT4 Germany. At the penultimate round of the season at Sachsenring, Bostandjiev scored his season-best result of fifth in race two.

In 2023, Bostandjiev competed in both ADAC GT4 Germany and GT4 European Series for Overdrive Racing, returning alongside Lefterov for the third season in a row. In the former, Bostandjiev scored a best result of ninth, twice, at the Nürburgring round, while in the latter, at Spa, he finished seventh in race one, which would turn out to be Bostandjiev's only points of the season.

On October 23, 2023, Bostandjiev was featured in the film "The First Lap", which covered Overdrive Racing's three seasons in ADAC GT4 Germany.

Following three years in GT4, Bostandjiev joined Iron Lynx to compete in the 2024 Lamborghini Super Trofeo Europe alongside Lefterov. Scoring his only podium second time out at Imola, Bostandjiev scored points six more times to round out the season seventh in points. Near the end of 2024, Bostandjiev made a one-off appearance in the Italian GT Sprint Championship with Iron Lynx at Monza. After retiring in race one, Bostandjiev finished fourth overall in race two and third in the Pro class.

After testing GB3 machinery in early 2025, Bostandjiev joined Fortec Motorsport for the 2025 GB3 Championship. Racing in only the first three rounds, Bostandjiev scored a best result of 14th in race one at Zandvoort before leaving the team ahead of the Hungaroring round. In parallel, Bostandjiev also competed in the GB4 Championship for Pace Performance, scoring a lone win at Silverstone and two more podiums to end the year 12th in points despite missing one round.

Bostandjiev moved to Eurocup-3 in 2026 with Hitech TGR. Starting the year in the three-round Spanish Winter Championship, Bostandjiev scored a lone win in the Jarama sprint, helping him end the winter 12th in points. In the main series meanwhile, Bostandjiev took a best result of 11th in race one at Imola to end the year 24th overall.

== Racing record ==
=== Racing career summary ===
| Season | Series | Team | Races | Wins | Poles | F/Laps | Podiums | Points | Position |
|---|---|---|---|---|---|---|---|---|---|
| 2021 | ADAC GT4 Germany | Overdrive Racing | 10 | 0 | 0 | 0 | 2 | 98 | 6th |
| 2022 | ADAC GT4 Germany | Overdrive Racing | 12 | 0 | 0 | 0 | 0 | 60 | 18th |
| 2023 | GT4 European Series - Silver | Overdrive Racing | 12 | 0 | 0 | 0 | 0 | 9 | 33rd |
| 2023 | ADAC GT4 Germany | Overdrive Racing | 12 | 0 | 0 | 0 | 0 | 30 | 21st |
| 2023 | Nürburgring Langstrecken-Serie – V5 | W&S Motorsport | 1 | 0 | 0 | 0 | 1 | 0 | NC |
| 2024 | Lamborghini Super Trofeo Europe – Pro | Iron Lynx | 11 | 0 | 0 | 0 | 1 | 44 | 7th |
| 2024 | Lamborghini Super Trofeo World Final – Pro | Iron Lynx | 2 | 0 | 0 | 0 | 0 | 2 | 13th |
| 2024 | Italian GT Sprint Championship – GT3 Pro | Iron Lynx | 2 | 0 | 0 | 0 | 1 | 0 | NC |
| 2024 | Nürburgring Langstrecken-Serie – V5 | AVIA W&S Motorsport | 1 | 0 | 0 | 0 | 1 | 0 | NC |
| 2025 | GB4 Championship | Pace Performance | 18 | 1 | 0 | 1 | 3 | 184 | 12th |
| 2025 | GB3 Championship | Fortec Motorsport | 9 | 0 | 0 | 0 | 0 | 20 | 32nd |
| 2026 | Eurocup-3 Spanish Winter Championship | Hitech | 9 | 1 | 0 | 1 | 1 | 16 | 12th |
| 2026 | Eurocup-3 | Hitech | 18 | 0 | 0 | 0 | 0 | 0 | 24th |

* Season still in progress.

=== Complete ADAC GT4 Germany results ===
(key) (Races in bold indicate pole position) (Races in italics indicate fastest lap)

| Year | Team | Car | 1 | 2 | 3 | 4 | 5 | 6 | 7 | 8 | 9 | 10 | 11 | 12 | DC | Points |
|---|---|---|---|---|---|---|---|---|---|---|---|---|---|---|---|---|
| 2021 | Overdrive Racing | Porsche 718 Cayman GT4 Clubsport | OSC1; 1; 9 | OSC1; 2; 10 | RBR; 1; 12 | RBR; 2; 10 | ZAN; 1 | ZAN; 2 | SAC; 1; 19 | SAC; 2; 13 | HOC; 1; 8 | HOC; 2; 3 | NÜR; 1; 2 | NÜR; 2; 7 | 6th | 98 |
| 2022 | Overdrive Racing | Porsche 718 Cayman GT4 Clubsport | OSC; 1; 14 | OSC; 2; 19 | RBR; 1; 19 | RBR; 2; 6 | ZAN; 1; 9 | ZAN; 2; 16 | NÜR; 1; 28 | NÜR; 2; 9 | SAC; 1; 9 | SAC; 2; 5 | HOC; 1; 8 | HOC; 2; 6 | 18th | 60 |
| 2023 | Overdrive Racing | Porsche 718 Cayman GT4 Clubsport | OSC; 1; 12 | OSC; 2; 14 | ZAN; 1; 22 | ZAN; 2 Ret | NÜR; 1; 9 | NÜR; 2; 9 | LAU; 1 Ret | LAU; 2 Ret | SAC; 1 Ret | SAC; 2; 13 | HOC; 1; 24 | HOC; 2; 10 | 21st | 30 |

=== Complete GT4 European Series results ===
(key) (Races in bold indicate pole position) (Races in italics indicate fastest lap)

| Year | Team | Car | Class | 1 | 2 | 3 | 4 | 5 | 6 | 7 | 8 | 9 | 10 | 11 | 12 | Pos | Points |
|---|---|---|---|---|---|---|---|---|---|---|---|---|---|---|---|---|---|
| 2023 | Overdrive Racing | Porsche 718 Cayman GT4 Clubsport | Silver | MNZ; 1; 25 | MNZ; 2; 12 | LEC; 1; 21 | LEC; 2; 18 | SPA; 1; 7 | SPA; 2; 13 | MIS; 1 Ret | MIS; 2 Ret | HOC; 1 Ret | HOC; 2; 18 | CAT; 1; 18 | CAT; 2; 15 | 33rd | 9 |

=== Complete GB4 Championship results ===
(key) (Races in bold indicate pole position) (Races in italics indicate fastest lap)

| Year | Entrant | 1 | 2 | 3 | 4 | 5 | 6 | 7 | 8 | 9 | 10 | 11 | 12 | 13 | 14 | 15 | 16 | 17 | 18 | 19 | 20 | 21 | 22 | DC | Points |
|---|---|---|---|---|---|---|---|---|---|---|---|---|---|---|---|---|---|---|---|---|---|---|---|---|---|
| 2025 | Pace Performance | DON; 1; 7 | DON; 2 Ret | DON; 3; 3^{4} | SIL1; 1 | SIL1; 2 | SIL1; 3 | OUL; 1; 5 | OUL; 2; 6 | OUL; 3; 15 | SNE; 1; 14 | SNE; 2; 20 | SNE; 3; 11^{4} | SIL2; 1; 23 | SIL2; 2; 16 | SIL2; 3; 1^{2} | BRH; 1; 9 | BRH; 2; 10 | BRH; 3 C | DON2; 1; 10 | DON2; 2; 2 | DON2; 3; 12^{2} | DON2; 4; 19 | 12th | 184 |

=== Complete GB3 Championship results ===
(key) (Races in bold indicate pole position) (Races in italics indicate fastest lap)

| Year | Team | 1 | 2 | 3 | 4 | 5 | 6 | 7 | 8 | 9 | 10 | 11 | 12 | 13 | 14 | 15 | 16 | 17 | 18 | 19 | 20 | 21 | 22 | 23 | 24 | DC | Points |
|---|---|---|---|---|---|---|---|---|---|---|---|---|---|---|---|---|---|---|---|---|---|---|---|---|---|---|---|
| 2025 | Fortec Motorsport | SIL1; 1; 23 | SIL1; 2; 18 | SIL1; 3 Ret | ZAN; 1; 14 | ZAN; 2; 15 | ZAN; 3 Ret | SPA; 1; 17 | SPA; 2; 23 | SPA; 3; 21 | HUN; 1 | HUN; 2 | HUN; 3 | SIL2; 1 | SIL2; 2 | SIL2; 3 | BRH; 1 | BRH; 2 | BRH; 3 | DON; 1 | DON; 2 | DON; 3 | MNZ; 1 | MNZ; 2 | MNZ; 3 | 32nd | 20 |

=== Complete Eurocup-3 Spanish Winter Championship results ===
(key) (Races in bold indicate pole position) (Races in italics indicate fastest lap)

| Year | Team | 1 | 2 | 3 | 4 | 5 | 6 | 7 | 8 | 9 | DC | Points |
|---|---|---|---|---|---|---|---|---|---|---|---|---|
| 2026 | Hitech | POR; 1; 15 | POR; SR; 6 | POR; 2 Ret | JAR; 1; 15 | JAR; SR; 1 | JAR; 2; 22 | ARA; 1; 14 | ARA; SR; 17 | ARA; 2; 12 | 12th | 16 |

=== Complete Eurocup-3 results ===
(key) (Races in bold indicate pole position; races in italics indicate fastest lap)

| Year | Team | 1 | 2 | 3 | 4 | 5 | 6 | 7 | 8 | 9 | 10 | 11 | 12 | 13 | 14 | 15 | 16 | 17 | 18 | 19 | DC | Points |
|---|---|---|---|---|---|---|---|---|---|---|---|---|---|---|---|---|---|---|---|---|---|---|
| 2026 | Hitech | LEC; 1; 28 | LEC; SR; 26 | LEC; 2; 23 | POR; 1; 12 | POR; 2; 16 | IMO; 1; 11 | IMO; SR; Ret | IMO; 2 DNS | MNZ; 1 Ret | MNZ; 2; 19 | SIL; 1; 16 | SIL; 2; 23 | JER; 1; 25 | JER; SR; 25 | JER; 2 Ret | HUN; 1; 14 | HUN; 2 Ret | CAT; 1; 15 | CAT; 2; 26 | 24th | 0 |
