= 2025 GB4 Championship =

British motor racing championship

The 2025 GB4 Championship partnered by the BRDC was the fourth season of a motor racing championship for open wheel, formula racing cars in Britain. The 2025 season, which was organised by MotorSport Vision, ran over seven triple-header rounds.

GB4 acted as a direct feeder series to higher open-wheel categories, including the existing GB3 Championship partnered by the BRDC. GB4 ran primarily on the same British GT race programme as GB3, and retained many of the same championship partners.

== Teams and drivers ==
| Team | No. | Driver | Rounds |
|---|---|---|---|
| (United Kingdom) KMR Sport | 3 | (Republic of Ireland) Alex O'Grady | All |
| (United Kingdom) KMR Sport | 9 | (United Kingdom) Megan Bruce | 1–6 |
| (United Kingdom) KMR Sport | 15 | (United Kingdom) Lily-May Watkins | All |
| (United Kingdom) KMR Sport | 69 | (United Kingdom) Lewis Wherrell | 7 |
| (United Kingdom) Douglas Motorsport | 7 | (Sweden) Enzo Hallman | All |
| (United Kingdom) Douglas Motorsport | 26 | (United Kingdom) Lucas Blakeley | 7 |
| (United Kingdom) Douglas Motorsport | 28 | (United Kingdom) Dayton Coulthard | All |
| (United Kingdom) Douglas Motorsport | 32 | (United Kingdom) Luke Hilton | 1–4, 6 |
| (United Kingdom) Douglas Motorsport | 62 | (Germany) Arjen Kräling | 5 |
| (United Kingdom) Fortec Motorsports | 8 | (United Kingdom) Thomas Ingram Hill | All |
| (United Kingdom) Fortec Motorsports | 23 | (Denmark) Luca Magnussen | 1–3, 5–7 |
| (United Kingdom) Fortec Motorsports | 50 | (Australia) Jack Taylor | All |
| (United Kingdom) Hillspeed | 10 | (United Kingdom) Flame Airikkala | 6–7 |
| (United Kingdom) Hillspeed | 49 | (Poland) Daniel Guinchard | All |
| (United Kingdom) Hillspeed | 77 | (United States) Leandro Juncos | All |
| (United Kingdom) Pace Performance | 17 | (Bulgaria) Stefan Bostandjiev | 1, 3–7 |
| (United Kingdom) Pace Performance | 76 | (United Kingdom) Josh McLean | All |
| (United Kingdom) Pace Performance | 95 | (United Kingdom) Flame Airikkala | 4–5 |
| (United Kingdom) Pace Performance | 95 | (United States) John O'Donnell | 7 |
| (United Kingdom) Arden Motorsport | 24 | (United Kingdom) Dudley Ruddock | 4–7 |
| (United Kingdom) Arden Motorsport | 27 | (United Kingdom) Leon Wilson | All |
| (United Kingdom) Arden Motorsport | 55 | (United States) Ava Dobson | All |
| (United Kingdom) Elite Motorsport | 35 | (United Kingdom) Isaac Phelps | All |
| (United Kingdom) Elite Motorsport | 46 | (India) Ary Bansal | All |
| (United Kingdom) Elite Motorsport | 51 | (Japan) Alexandros Kattoulas | All |
| (United Kingdom) Graham Brunton Racing | 44 | (Canada) Mayer Deonarine | 1–3, 5 |
| (United Kingdom) Graham Brunton Racing | 45 | (Canada) Callum Baxter | 1–5 |
| (United Kingdom) Graham Brunton Racing | 98 | (Canada) Alex Berg | 1–4 |
| (United Kingdom) Fox Motorsport | 48 | (United Kingdom) Holly Miall | All |
| (United Kingdom) Fox Motorsport | 88 | (United States) Caitlyn McDaniel | All |
| (United Kingdom) ADM | 59 | (United States) Jason Pribyl | All |
| (United Kingdom) Rossoverde Scorpio Racing | 64 | (United Kingdom) Neirin Evans | 1–2 |

== Race calendar ==
| Round | | Circuit | Date | Pole position | Fastest lap | Winning driver | Winning team |
|---|---|---|---|---|---|---|---|
| 1 | R1 | Donington Park (Grand Prix Circuit, Leicestershire) | 5 April | (United Kingdom) Isaac Phelps | (India) Ary Bansal | (United Kingdom) Isaac Phelps | (United Kingdom) Elite Motorsport |
| 1 | R2 | Donington Park (Grand Prix Circuit, Leicestershire) | 6 April | (United Kingdom) Isaac Phelps | (India) Ary Bansal | (India) Ary Bansal | (United Kingdom) Elite Motorsport |
| 1 | R3 | Donington Park (Grand Prix Circuit, Leicestershire) | 6 April | | (United Kingdom) Isaac Phelps | (Canada) Alex Berg | (United Kingdom) Graham Brunton Racing |
| 2 | R4 | Silverstone Circuit (Grand Prix Circuit, Northamptonshire) | 26 April | (Japan) Alexandros Kattoulas | (Japan) Alexandros Kattoulas | (Japan) Alexandros Kattoulas | (United Kingdom) Elite Motorsport |
| 2 | R5 | Silverstone Circuit (Grand Prix Circuit, Northamptonshire) | 27 April | (Japan) Alexandros Kattoulas | (Poland) Daniel Guinchard | (United Kingdom) Isaac Phelps | (United Kingdom) Elite Motorsport |
| 2 | R6 | Silverstone Circuit (Grand Prix Circuit, Northamptonshire) | 27 April | | (Japan) Alexandros Kattoulas | (Poland) Daniel Guinchard | (United Kingdom) Hillspeed |
| 3 | R7 | Oulton Park (International Circuit, Cheshire) | 24 May | (Poland) Daniel Guinchard | (Australia) Jack Taylor | (Republic of Ireland) Alex O'Grady | (United Kingdom) KMR Sport |
| 3 | R8 | Oulton Park (International Circuit, Cheshire) | 26 May | (Poland) Daniel Guinchard | (Poland) Daniel Guinchard | (Poland) Daniel Guinchard | (United Kingdom) Hillspeed |
| 3 | R9 | Oulton Park (International Circuit, Cheshire) | 26 May | | (Canada) Callum Baxter | (Sweden) Enzo Hallman | (United Kingdom) Douglas Motorsport |
| 4 | R10 | Snetterton Circuit (300 Circuit, Norfolk) | 12 July | (India) Ary Bansal | (Poland) Daniel Guinchard | (India) Ary Bansal | (United Kingdom) Elite Motorsport |
| 4 | R11 | Snetterton Circuit (300 Circuit, Norfolk) | 13 July | (India) Ary Bansal | (Poland) Daniel Guinchard | (India) Ary Bansal | (United Kingdom) Elite Motorsport |
| 4 | R12 | Snetterton Circuit (300 Circuit, Norfolk) | 13 July | | (Australia) Jack Taylor | (United Kingdom) Leon Wilson | (United Kingdom) Arden Motorsport |
| 5 | R13 | Silverstone Circuit (Grand Prix Circuit, Northamptonshire) | 2 August | (Australia) Jack Taylor | (United Kingdom) Thomas Ingram Hill | (Australia) Jack Taylor | (United Kingdom) Fortec Motorsports |
| 5 | R14 | Silverstone Circuit (Grand Prix Circuit, Northamptonshire) | 3 August | (Australia) Jack Taylor | (Australia) Jack Taylor | (Australia) Jack Taylor | (United Kingdom) Fortec Motorsports |
| 5 | R15 | Silverstone Circuit (Grand Prix Circuit, Northamptonshire) | 3 August | | (India) Ary Bansal | (Bulgaria) Stefan Bostandjiev | (United Kingdom) Pace Performance |
| 6 | R16 | Brands Hatch (Grand Prix Circuit, Kent) | 23 August | (United Kingdom) Isaac Phelps | (United Kingdom) Isaac Phelps | (United Kingdom) Isaac Phelps | (United Kingdom) Elite Motorsport |
| 6 | R17 | Brands Hatch (Grand Prix Circuit, Kent) | 24 August | (United Kingdom) Isaac Phelps | (United Kingdom) Isaac Phelps | (United Kingdom) Isaac Phelps | (United Kingdom) Elite Motorsport |
| 6 | R18 | Brands Hatch (Grand Prix Circuit, Kent) | 24 August | cancelled due to accident in a support race | | | |
| 7 | R19 | Donington Park (Grand Prix Circuit, Leicestershire) | 4 October | (United Kingdom) Isaac Phelps | (India) Ary Bansal | (United Kingdom) Dayton Coulthard | (United Kingdom) Douglas Motorsport |
| 7 | R20 | Donington Park (Grand Prix Circuit, Leicestershire) | 5 October | (United Kingdom) Isaac Phelps | (United Kingdom) Isaac Phelps | (United Kingdom) Leon Wilson | (United Kingdom) Arden Motorsport |
| 7 | R21 | Donington Park (Grand Prix Circuit, Leicestershire) | 5 October | | (Republic of Ireland) Alex O'Grady | (India) Ary Bansal | (United Kingdom) Elite Motorsport |
| 7 | R22 | Donington Park (Grand Prix Circuit, Leicestershire) | 5 October | | (Bulgaria) Stefan Bostandjiev | (United States) Leandro Juncos | (United Kingdom) Hillspeed |

== Championship standings ==
Scoring system

Points are awarded to the top 20 classified finishers in races one and two, with the third race awarding points to only the top 15. Race three, which has its grid formed by reversing the qualifying order, awards extra points for positions gained from the drivers' respective starting positions.

| Races | Position, points per race | | | | | | | | | | | | | | | | | | | |
| Races | 1st | 2nd | 3rd | 4th | 5th | 6th | 7th | 8th | 9th | 10th | 11th | 12th | 13th | 14th | 15th | 16th | 17th | 18th | 19th | 20th |
|---|---|---|---|---|---|---|---|---|---|---|---|---|---|---|---|---|---|---|---|---|
| Races 1 & 2 | 35 | 29 | 24 | 21 | 19 | 17 | 15 | 13 | 12 | 11 | 10 | 9 | 8 | 7 | 6 | 5 | 4 | 3 | 2 | 1 |
| Race 3 | 20 | 17 | 15 | 13 | 11 | 10 | 9 | 8 | 7 | 6 | 5 | 4 | 3 | 2 | 1 | | | | | |

=== Drivers' championship ===
| Pos | Driver | DON1 | | | SIL1 | | | OUL | | | SNE | | | SIL2 | | | BRH | | | DON2 | | | | Pts |
| Pos | Driver | R1 | R2 | R3 | R4 | R5 | R6 | R7 | R8 | R9 | R10 | R11 | R12 | R13 | R14 | R15 | R16 | R17 | R18 | R19 | R20 | R21 | R22 | Pts |
|---|---|---|---|---|---|---|---|---|---|---|---|---|---|---|---|---|---|---|---|---|---|---|---|---|
| 1 | (India) Ary Bansal | 21 | 1 | 5^{5} | 2 | 3 | 4^{5} | 16 | 8 | 10 | **1** | **1** | Ret | 8 | 8 | 3^{1} | 2 | 2 | C | 2 | 9 | 1^{3} | 3^{7} | 402 |
| 2 | (United Kingdom) Isaac Phelps | **1** | **2** | 19 | 5 | 1 | 12 | 17 | 4 | 22 | 2 | 4 | 9^{2} | 7 | 6 | 5^{1} | **1** | **1** | C | **9** | **4** | 4^{8} | 5^{6} | 391 |
| 3 | (Poland) Daniel Guinchard | 2 | 5 | 4^{5} | 6 | 5 | 1^{2} | **13** | **1** | 4^{8} | 3 | 2 | 7^{2} | 11 | 11 | 6^{11} | 3 | 3 | C | 12 | 21 | 5^{6} | 2^{7} | 391 |
| 4 | (Japan) Alexandros Kattoulas | 3 | 3 | 6 | **1** | **2** | 20 | 15 | 3 | 21 | 6 | 5 | 8 | 4 | Ret | 7^{2} | 4 | 5 | C | 7 | 8 | 8^{7} | 8 | 319 |
| 5 | (United States) Leandro Juncos | 4 | 4 | 14 | 9 | 6 | 3^{1} | Ret | DSQ | 8 | 10 | Ret | 5^{5} | 6 | 2 | 2^{3} | 5 | Ret | C | 6 | 10 | 6^{2} | 1^{2} | 269 |
| 6 | (United Kingdom) Thomas Ingram Hill | 11 | Ret | 9 | 10 | Ret | 6 | 21 | 14 | 6^{12} | 7 | 6 | 4^{1} | 2 | 4 | 4^{3} | 8 | 7 | C | 5 | 11 | 2^{1} | 6 | 264 |
| 7 | (United Kingdom) Leon Wilson | Ret | 7 | 8 | 4 | 9 | 10 | 6 | 7 | 18 | 16 | Ret | 1^{2} | 3 | 13 | 8^{2} | Ret | 4 | C | 4 | 1 | 7^{3} | 9 | 259 |
| 8 | (Republic of Ireland) Alex O'Grady | 15 | 12 | 13^{12} | 13 | 8 | 9^{4} | 1 | 2 | 14 | 5 | 7 | 10 | 13 | 5 | 18 | 6 | 6 | C | Ret | 20 | 3^{3} | 20 | 250 |
| 9 | (Sweden) Enzo Hallman | 6 | 11 | 2^{2} | 18 | 12 | 11^{5} | 3 | 15 | 1^{12} | 8 | 8 | 6 | 12 | 9 | 14 | 12 | 12 | C | 8 | 22 | 22 | 13^{1} | 224 |
| 10 | (Australia) Jack Taylor | 23 | 6 | 10^{1} | 3 | 4 | Ret | 22 | Ret | 5^{4} | 9 | 13 | 2 | **1** | **1** | 24 | 7 | 8 | C | Ret | Ret | 16 | Ret | 219 |
| 11 | (United Kingdom) Dayton Coulthard | 14 | 9 | 18 | 8 | 7 | 8 | Ret | 11 | 2^{12} | 12 | Ret | 17 | 9 | 10 | 15 | Ret | 9 | C | 1 | 13 | 10 | 4^{2} | 203 |
| 12 | (Bulgaria) Stefan Bostandjiev | 7 | Ret | 3^{4} | | | | 5 | 6 | 15 | 14 | 20 | 11^{4} | 23 | 16 | 1^{2} | 9 | 10 | C | 10 | 2 | 12^{2} | 19 | 184 |
| 13 | (Denmark) Luca Magnussen | 16 | 15 | Ret | 11 | Ret | 14 | 2 | 13 | 23 | | | | 17 | 7 | 10^{3} | 14 | Ret | C | 11 | 6 | 13^{3} | 10^{5} | 139 |
| 14 | (United Kingdom) Josh McLean | 17 | 16 | 15^{5} | 20 | 16 | 15^{5} | 7 | Ret | 12^{9} | 13 | 10 | 15^{2} | 14 | 18 | 11^{3} | 15 | 14 | C | 13 | 14 | 21 | 11^{5} | 133 |
| 15 | (Canada) Callum Baxter | 10 | 13 | 11^{3} | 17 | 13 | 5 | 12 | 9 | 3^{1} | 15 | 11 | Ret | 18 | 15 | 9^{9} | | | | | | | | 128 |
| 16 | (Canada) Alex Berg | 8 | 8 | 1 | 14 | 10 | Ret | 11 | 10 | 13 | 11 | 9 | 3 | | | | | | | | | | | 125 |
| 17 | (United States) Jason Pribyl | 13 | 14 | Ret | 12 | Ret | 2 | 20 | 12 | 17 | 19 | 14 | 12^{2} | 10 | 17 | Ret | 10 | Ret | C | Ret | 7 | 14 | 7^{6} | 124 |
| 18 | (United Kingdom) Luke Hilton | 5 | 23 | 7 | 7 | DSQ | 19 | 19 | 5 | 7 | 4 | 3 | 16 | | | | Ret | 19 | C | | | | | 120 |
| 19 | (United States) Ava Dobson | 12 | 10 | 23 | 21 | 14 | 13^{4} | 8 | Ret | 19 | 18 | 19 | 14^{5} | 15 | 19 | 19 | 11 | 13 | C | 14 | 3 | 23 | 12 | 120 |
| 20 | (United Kingdom) Megan Bruce | 24 | 17 | 22 | 16 | 15 | 16^{2} | 4 | Ret | 9^{11} | 17 | 12 | 13^{5} | 16 | 12 | 16^{4} | 13 | 11 | C | | | | | 113 |
| 21 | (Canada) Mayer Deonarine | 9 | 18 | 12^{7} | 15 | 11 | 7^{12} | 18 | Ret | 16 | | | | 19 | 24 | 12^{7} | | | | | | | | 79 |
| 22 | (United Kingdom) Holly Miall | 19 | 20 | 17^{4} | 19 | 17 | 18^{3} | 9 | 16 | 11^{11} | 22 | Ret | 20^{3} | 22 | 20 | 20^{3} | 18 | 16 | C | 19 | 17 | 17^{4} | 15^{3} | 78 |
| 23 | (United Kingdom) Dudley Ruddock | | | | | | | | | | 21 | 17 | 19^{3} | 21 | 14 | 17^{4} | 16 | 17 | C | 15 | 15 | 15^{4} | 14^{7} | 53 |
| 24 | (Germany) Arjen Kräling | | | | | | | | | | | | | 5 | 3 | 13 | | | | | | | | 46 |
| 25 | (United States) Caitlyn McDaniel | 22 | 19 | 20^{4} | 24 | 20 | 21^{3} | 14 | 18 | 20^{4} | 24 | 18 | 21^{3} | 24 | 22 | 22^{3} | 20 | 20 | C | 20 | 19 | 18^{5} | 18^{2} | 45 |
| 26 | (United Kingdom) Lucas Blakeley | | | | | | | | | | | | | | | | | | | 3 | 12 | 9 | | 40 |
| 27 | (United Kingdom) Lily-May Watkins | 20 | 21 | 21^{2} | 23 | 19 | 22^{1} | 10 | 17 | Ret | 23 | 16 | Ret | Ret | 21 | 21^{1} | 17 | 18 | C | 21 | 23 | 20^{4} | 16^{1} | 39 |
| 28 | (United Kingdom) Flame Airikkala | | | | | | | | | | 20 | 15 | 18^{2} | 20 | 23 | 23^{1} | 19 | 15 | C | 16 | 16 | 19^{3} | 17^{2} | 34 |
| 29 | (United Kingdom) Lewis Wherrell | | | | | | | | | | | | | | | | | | | 17 | 5 | 11 | | 28 |
| 30 | (United Kingdom) Neirin Evans | 18 | 22 | 16^{6} | 22 | 18 | 17^{5} | | | | | | | | | | | | | | | | | 17 |
| 31 | (United States) John O'Donnell | | | | | | | | | | | | | | | | | | | 18 | 18 | Ret | | 6 |
| Pos | Driver | R1 | R2 | R3 | R4 | R5 | R6 | R7 | R8 | R9 | R10 | R11 | R12 | R13 | R14 | R15 | R16 | R17 | R18 | R19 | R20 | R21 | R22 | Pts |
| Pos | Driver | DON1 | | | SIL1 | | | OUL | | | SNE | | | SIL2 | | | BRH | | | DON2 | | | | Pts |

| Colour | Result |
|---|---|
| Gold | Winner |
| Silver | Second place |
| Bronze | Third place |
| Green | Points classification |
| Blue | Non-points classification |
| Blue | Non-classified finish (NC) |
| Purple | Retired, not classified (Ret) |
| Red | Did not qualify (DNQ) |
| Red | Did not pre-qualify (DNPQ) |
| Black | Disqualified (DSQ) |
| White | Did not start (DNS) |
| White | Withdrew (WD) |
| White | Race cancelled (C) |
| Blank | Did not practice (DNP) |
| Blank | Did not arrive (DNA) |
| Blank | Excluded (EX) |

**Bold** – Pole

Italics – Fastest Lap

=== Teams' championship ===
| Pos | Driver | DON1 | | | SIL1 | | | OUL | | | SNE | | | SIL2 | | | BRH | | | DON2 | | | | Pts |
| Pos | Driver | R1 | R2 | R3 | R4 | R5 | R6 | R7 | R8 | R9 | R10 | R11 | R12 | R13 | R14 | R15 | R16 | R17 | R18 | R19 | R20 | R21 | R22 | Pts |
|---|---|---|---|---|---|---|---|---|---|---|---|---|---|---|---|---|---|---|---|---|---|---|---|---|
| 1 | (United Kingdom) Elite Motorsport | 1 | 1 | 5^{5} | 1 | 1 | 4^{5} | 15 | 3 | 10 | 1 | 1 | 8 | 4 | 6 | 3^{1} | 1 | 1 | C | 2 | 4 | 1^{3} | 3^{7} | 881 |
| 1 | (United Kingdom) Elite Motorsport | 3 | 2 | 6 | 2 | 2 | 12 | 16 | 4 | 21 | 2 | 4 | 9^{2} | 7 | 8 | 5^{1} | 2 | 2 | C | 7 | 8 | 4^{8} | 5^{6} | 881 |
| 2 | (United Kingdom) Hillspeed | 2 | 4 | 4^{5} | 6 | 5 | 1^{2} | 13 | 1 | 4^{8} | 3 | 2 | 5^{5} | 6 | 2 | 2^{3} | 3 | 3 | C | 6 | 10 | 5^{6} | 1^{2} | 671 |
| 2 | (United Kingdom) Hillspeed | 4 | 5 | 14 | 9 | 6 | 3^{1} | Ret | DSQ | 8 | 10 | Ret | 7^{2} | 11 | 11 | 6^{11} | 6 | 15 | C | 12 | 16 | 6^{2} | 2^{7} | 671 |
| 3 | (United Kingdom) Fortec Motorsport | 11 | 6 | 9 | 3 | 4 | 6 | 2 | 13 | 5^{4} | 7 | 6 | 2 | 1 | 1 | 4^{3} | 7 | 7 | C | 5 | 6 | 2^{1} | 6 | 586 |
| 3 | (United Kingdom) Fortec Motorsport | 16 | 15 | 10^{1} | 10 | Ret | 14 | 21 | 14 | 6^{12} | 9 | 13 | 4^{1} | 2 | 4 | 10^{3} | 8 | 8 | C | 11 | 11 | 13^{3} | 10^{5} | 586 |
| 4 | (United Kingdom) Douglas Motorsport | 5 | 9 | 2^{2} | 7 | 7 | 8 | 3 | 5 | 1^{12} | 4 | 3 | 6 | 5 | 3 | 13 | 12 | 9 | C | 1 | 12 | 9 | 4^{2} | 563 |
| 4 | (United Kingdom) Douglas Motorsport | 6 | 11 | 7 | 8 | 12 | 11^{5} | 19 | 11 | 2^{12} | 8 | 8 | 16 | 9 | 9 | 14 | Ret | 12 | C | 3 | 13 | 10 | 13^{1} | 563 |
| 5 | (United Kingdom) Arden Motorsport | 12 | 7 | 8 | 4 | 9 | 10 | 6 | 7 | 18 | 16 | 17 | 1^{2} | 3 | 13 | 8^{2} | 11 | 4 | C | 4 | 1 | 7^{3} | 9 | 407 |
| 5 | (United Kingdom) Arden Motorsport | Ret | 10 | 23 | 21 | 14 | 13^{4} | 8 | Ret | 19 | 18 | 19 | 14^{5} | 15 | 14 | 17^{4} | 16 | 13 | C | 14 | 3 | 15^{4} | 14^{7} | 407 |
| 6 | (United Kingdom) KMR Sport | 15 | 12 | 13^{12} | 13 | 8 | 9^{4} | 1 | 2 | 9^{11} | 5 | 7 | 10 | 13 | 5 | 16^{4} | 5 | 6 | C | 17 | 5 | 3^{3} | 16^{1} | 400 |
| 6 | (United Kingdom) KMR Sport | 20 | 17 | 21^{2} | 16 | 15 | 16^{2} | 4 | 17 | 14 | 17 | 12 | 13^{5} | 16 | 7 | 18 | 13 | 11 | C | 21 | 20 | 11 | 20 | 400 |
| 7 | (United Kingdom) Pace Performance | 7 | 16 | 3^{4} | 20 | 16 | 15^{5} | 5 | 6 | 12^{9} | 13 | 10 | 11^{4} | 14 | 16 | 1^{2} | 9 | 10 | C | 10 | 2 | 12^{2} | 11^{5} | 323 |
| 7 | (United Kingdom) Pace Performance | 17 | Ret | 15^{5} | | | | 7 | Ret | 15 | 14 | 15 | 15^{2} | 20 | 18 | 23^{1} | 15 | 14 | C | 13 | 14 | 21 | 19 | 323 |
| 8 | (United Kingdom) Graham Brunton Racing | 8 | 8 | 1 | 14 | 10 | 5 | 11 | 9 | 3^{1} | 11 | 9 | 3 | 18 | 15 | 9^{9} | | | | | | | | 295 |
| 8 | (United Kingdom) Graham Brunton Racing | 9 | 13 | 12^{7} | 15 | 11 | 7^{12} | 12 | 10 | 13 | 15 | 11 | Ret | 19 | 24 | 12^{7} | | | | | | | | 295 |
| 9 | (United Kingdom) ADM | 13 | 14 | Ret | 12 | Ret | 2 | 20 | 12 | 17 | 19 | 14 | 12^{2} | 10 | 17 | Ret | 10 | Ret | C | Ret | 7 | 14 | 7^{6} | 124 |
| 10 | (United Kingdom) Fox Motorsport | 19 | 19 | 17^{4} | 19 | 17 | 18^{3} | 9 | 16 | 11^{11} | 22 | 18 | 20^{3} | 22 | 20 | 20^{3} | 18 | 16 | C | 19 | 17 | 17^{4} | 15^{3} | 123 |
| 10 | (United Kingdom) Fox Motorsport | 22 | 20 | 20^{4} | 24 | 20 | 21^{3} | 14 | 18 | 20^{4} | 24 | Ret | 21^{3} | 24 | 22 | 22^{3} | 20 | 20 | C | 20 | 19 | 18^{5} | 18^{2} | 123 |
| 11 | (United Kingdom) Rossoverde Scorpio Racing | 18 | 22 | 16^{6} | 22 | 18 | 17^{5} | | | | | | | | | | | | | | | | | 17 |
| Pos | Driver | R1 | R2 | R3 | R4 | R5 | R6 | R7 | R8 | R9 | R10 | R11 | R12 | R13 | R14 | R15 | R16 | R17 | R18 | R19 | R20 | R21 | R22 | Pts |
| Pos | Driver | DON1 | | | SIL1 | | | OUL | | | SNE | | | SIL2 | | | BRH | | | DON2 | | | | Pts |
