= Alex Kattoulas =

British racing driver of Greek and Japanese descent (born 2005)

- Nationality: (United Kingdom) British
- Born: Alexandros George Yamamoto Kattoulas; 1 May 2005 (age 21) Tokyo, Japan

GB3 Championship career
- Debut season: 2024
- Car number: 23
- Former teams: Fortec Motorsports
- Starts: 6
- Wins: 0
- Podiums: 0
- Poles: 0
- Fastest laps: 0
- Best finish: 26th in 2026

Previous series
- 2025: GB4

Alexandros George Yamamoto Kattoulas (Greek: Άλεξ Καττούλας; born 1 May 2005) is a British racing driver of Japanese and Greek descent who last competed in the GB3 Championship for Fortec Motorsports.

Kattoulas previously competed for Elite Motorsport in the GB4 Championship.

== Career ==
Born in Tokyo in 2005, Kattoulas moved to Singapore in 2011 and began karting in 2014. In his first year of full-time karting in 2015, Kattoulas won the Rok Cup Singapore/Asia title in the Mini Rok class, whilst also finishing runner-up in the Singapore Karting Championship, and debuting on the international stage by racing in the Trofeo Delle Industrie.

The following year, Kattoulas mainly raced in Europe, finishing tenth in the Andrea Margutti Trophy for Babyrace Driver Academy, before switching to EvoKart for the rest of the year and ending the season by finishing fifth in the WSK Final Cup. Stepping up to Junior karting in 2017, Kattoulas finished sixth in the Swedish Karting Championship, and also made a brief appearance in Asia, finishing second in the Rok Cup Singapore standings. Kattoulas stayed in junior karts for 2018 with Forza Racing, but only managed a best overall result of 11th all year, scoring it in the season-opening WSK Champions Cup.

Kattoulas then took a hiatus from racing to finish school, before enrolling in a mathematics course at the University of Nottingham in 2023. Ahead of his second year of studies, Kattoulas opted to prioritize his racing career and subsequently made his single-seater debut in the 2024 GB3 Championship for Fortec Motorsports. Racing in the second-to-last round of the season at Donington Park, Kattoulas took a best result of 17th in race two and concluded the other two races in 20th.

Remaining on the single-seater ladder for 2025, Kattoulas joined Elite Motorsport to race in the GB4 Championship for his first full season in cars. After topping pre-season and pre-event tests at Donington Park, Kattoulas finished third in the first two races of the season at the same venue, before taking sixth in race three to leave Donington third in points. In the following round at Silverstone, Kattoulas took both pole positions before taking his maiden single-seater win in race one and finishing second in race two. Kattoulas then took his fifth podium of the season at Oulton Park by finishing third in race two, before finishing no higher than fourth in the following four rounds en route to a fourth-place points finish.

Kattoulas returned to the GB3 Championship for a full season in 2026 with Fortec Motorsports, but ultimately only competed in the Silverstone opener, where he finished in the top ten in all three races.

== Karting record ==
=== Karting career summary ===
Season	Series	Team	Position
2015	ROK Cup Singapore – Mini Rok		2nd
2015	Trofeo Delle Industrie – 60 Mini	Gamoto SNC	13th
2015	WSK Final Cup – 60 Mini	Gamoto SNC	17th
2016	Andrea Margutti Trophy – 60 Mini	Babyrace Driver Academy	10th
2016	WSK Super Master Series – 60 Mini	Babyrace Driver Academy	12th
2016	Trofeo Delle Industrie – 60 Mini	EvoKart Srl	13th
2016	ROK Cup International Final – Mini Rok	EvoKart Srl	21st
2016	WSK Final Cup – 60 Mini	EvoKart Srl	5th
2017	WSK Champions Cup – OK-J	Evokart Srl	46th
2017	WSK Super Master Series – OK-J	Evokart Srl	46th
2017	Karting European Championship – OK-J	Forza Racing	80th
2017	Swedish Karting Championship – OK-J	Forza Racing	6th
2017	Karting World Championship – OK-J	Forza Racing	NC
2017	WSK Final Cup – OK-J	Forza Racing	22nd
2017	ROK Cup Singapore – Junior Rok	Eugene Motorsport	2nd
2017	ROK Cup Asia – Junior Rok	Eugene Motorsport	5th
2018	WSK Champions Cup – OK-J	Forza Racing	11th
2018	WSK Super Master Series – OK-J	Forza Racing	23rd
2018	Karting European Championship – OK-J	Forza Racing	20th
2018	Deutsche Kart-Meisterschaft – OK-J	Forza Racing	24th
2018	Karting World Championship – OK-J	Forza Racing	NC

== Racing record ==
=== Racing career summary ===
Season	Series	Team	Races	Wins	Poles	F/Laps	Podiums	Points	Position
2024	GB3 Championship	Fortec Motorsports	3	0	0	0	0	6	32nd
2025	GB4 Championship	Elite Motorsport	21	1	2	2	5	319	4th
2026	GB3 Championship	Fortec Motorsports	3	0	0	0	0	33	26th

* Season still in progress.

=== Complete GB3 Championship results ===
(key) (Races in bold indicate pole position; races in italics indicate fastest lap; ^{superscript} indicates points for positions gained)

Year	Entrant	1	2	3	4	5	6	7	8	9	10	11	12	13	14	15	16	17	18	19	20	21	22	23	24	Pos	Points
2024	Fortec Motorsports	OUL; 1	OUL; 2	OUL; 3	SIL1; 1	SIL1; 2	SIL1; 3	SPA; 1	SPA; 2	SPA; 3	HUN; 1	HUN; 2	HUN; 3	ZAN; 1	ZAN; 2	ZAN; 3	SIL2; 1	SIL2; 2	SIL2; 3	DON; 1; 20	DON; 2; 17	DON; 3; 20^{1}	BRH; 1	BRH; 2	BRH; 3	32nd	6
2026	Fortec Motorsports	SIL1; 1; 9	SIL1; 2; 9	SIL1; 3; 10^{3}	SPA; 1 WD	SPA; 2 WD	SPA; 3 C	HUN; 1	HUN; 2	HUN; 3	RBR; 1	RBR; 2	RBR; 3	SIL2; 1	SIL2; 2	SIL2; 3	DON; 1	DON; 2	DON; 3	BRH; 1	BRH; 2	BRH; 3	CAT; 1	CAT; 2	CAT; 3	26th	33

=== Complete GB4 Championship results ===
(key) (Races in bold indicate pole position; races in italics indicate fastest lap; ^{superscript} indicates points for positions gained)

Year	Entrant	1	2	3	4	5	6	7	8	9	10	11	12	13	14	15	16	17	18	19	20	21	22	Pos	Points
2025	Elite Motorsport	DON; 1; 3	DON; 2; 3	DON; 3; 6	**SIL1**; **1**; 1	**SIL1**; **2**; 2	SIL1; 3; 20	OUL; 1; 15	OUL; 2; 3	OUL; 3; 21	SNE; 1; 6	SNE; 2; 5	SNE; 3; 8	SIL2; 1; 4	SIL2; 2 Ret	SIL2; 3; 7^{2}	BRH; 1; 4	BRH; 2; 5	BRH; 3 C	DON2; 1; 7	DON2; 2; 8	DON2; 3; 8^{7}	DON2; 4; 8	4th	319
