= Luna Fluxá =

Spanish racing driver (born 2010)

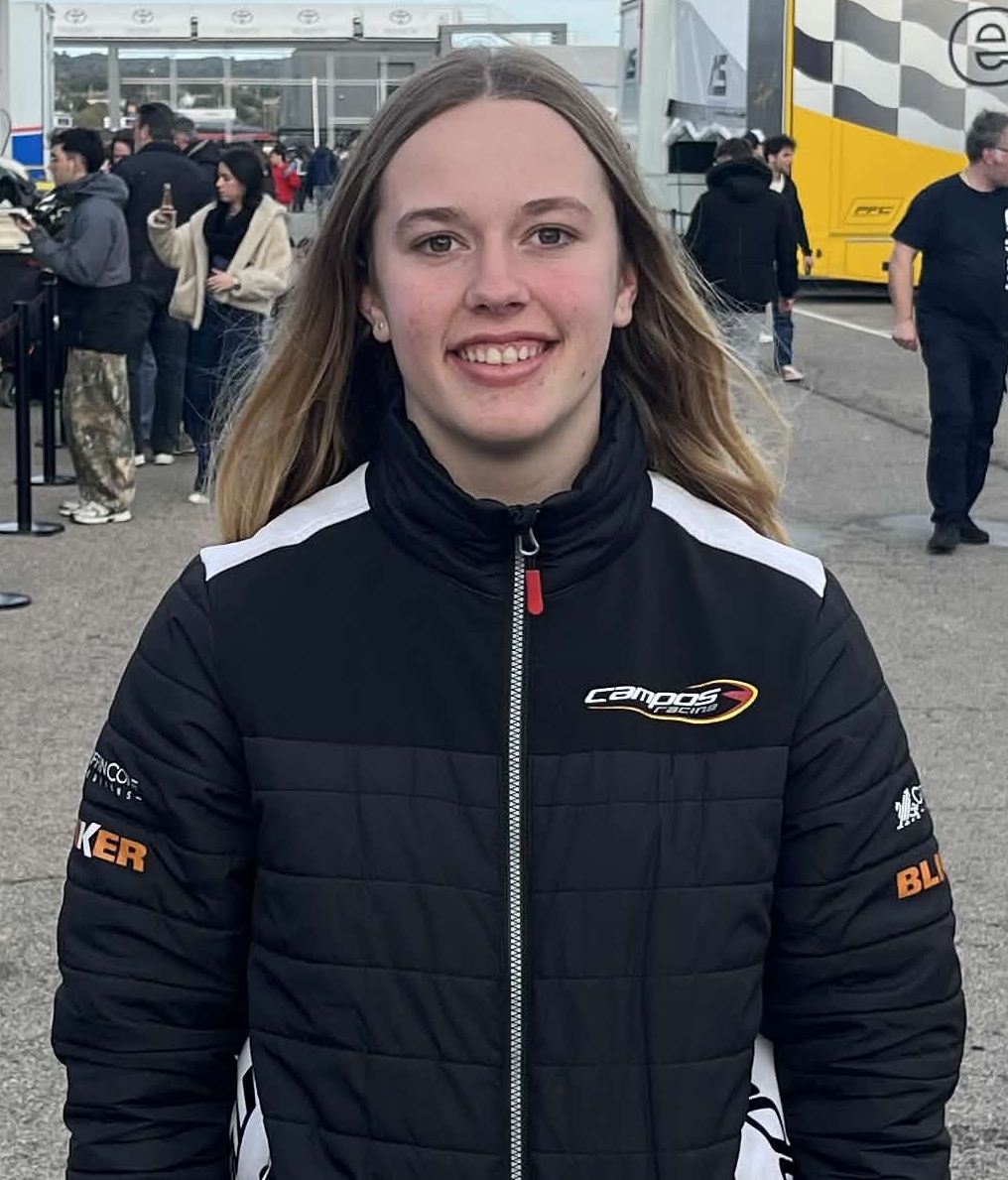
- Fluxá in 2026
- Born: Luna Jasmine Fluxá Cross; 9 August 2010 (age 16); Mallorca, Balearic Islands, Spain
- Relatives: Lorenzo Fluxá (brother); Lucas Fluxá (brother); Miquel Fluxà Rosselló (great-uncle)
- Nationality: (Spain) Spanish

F4 Spanish Championship career
- Debut season: 2026
- Current team: Campos
- Starts: 6
- Wins: 0
- Podiums: 0
- Poles: 0
- Fastest laps: 0
- Best finish: TBD in 2026

Previous series
- 2026: Eurocup-4 Spanish Winter

Awards
- 2024: F1 Academy Rising Star
- Statistics up to date as of 7 June 2026.

Luna Jasmine Fluxá Cross (Spanish pronunciation: [ˈluna fluˈksa ˈkros]; born 9 August 2010) is a Spanish racing driver who competes in the F4 Spanish Championship for Campos Racing as part of the Mercedes Junior Team.

Born and raised in Mallorca, Fluxá is the younger sister of racing drivers Lorenzo and Lucas Fluxá. She began competitive kart racing aged six, winning multiple international titles; by winning the OK-N class of Champions of the Future in 2024, she became the first female victor of a senior global championship in 58 years.

== Early life ==
Luna Jasmine Fluxá Cross was born on 9 August 2010 in Mallorca, Balearic Islands, Spain. Hailing from a wealthy family who founded and own Iberostar, Lottusse, and Camper, Fluxá is the younger sister of fellow racing drivers Lorenzo and Lucas. Lorenzo has competed in the LMP2 class of the European Le Mans Series since 2024 and Lucas in F4 Spanish since 2024. Her great-uncle, Miquel Fluxà Rosselló, is a multi-billionaire businessman who founded Iberostar in 1986.

== Racing career ==
=== Karting (2017–2025) ===
==== 2017–2020: Career beginnings ====
Fluxá started kart racing in 2017, aged six. She first joined the European stage in 2019, finishing an impressive 11th on her European debut in the IAME International Final, in the Minime Cadet category.

Fluxá then competed over the course of the entire year in Europe, making a few appearances in prestigious championships such as the WSK Super Master Series. Her strongest championship finish in 2020 was finishing eighth in the IAME Euro Series, in the X30 Mini category.

==== 2021–2023: Maiden international title in Mini ====
2021 ended up being Fluxá's last year in Mini karting, and she had a strong year. Regularly making the finales in each event that she was competing in, she managed to win the 2021 IAME Euro Series in the category. Fluxá then went on to end the year with top-ten finishes in the IAME International Final and the International IAME Games.

For the 2022 season, Fluxá stepped up to the OKJ category. She drove for KR Motorsport, a prestigious karting team, for the entirety of the year. Fluxá went on to achieve little in her first year of OKJ karting, with a best championship result of 21st in the Champions of the Future Winter Series early in the year.

Fluxá was announced to be racing for Prema for 2023 with support from Kart Republic. For the year, Fluxá continued in OKJ, and over the course of the year yielded some strong results. At the beginning of the year, she managed to finish fourth in the WSK Champions Cup and she also ended the year strongly, managing to finish fourth in the Champions of the Future Academy Program (COTFA) in Al Forsan, which is located in the UAE.

==== 2024–2025: Senior champion as a Mercedes Junior ====
Fluxá drove for Prema again in 2024, stepping up to OK karts, and has started the season strongly. She won her first event of the year in Cremona, in the COTFA. She eventually won the championship. Fluxá became the fifth woman in history to win a major senior international karting title, (Note: Fluxá became the fifth woman in history to win a major senior international karting title, after: Susanna Raganelli, World Championship, 1966; Cathy Muller, European Championship, 100 cc, 1979; Sophie Kumpen, Andrea Margutti Trophy, FA, 1995; Beitske Visser, WSK Master Series, KZ2, 2010; Cyndie Allemann also won the CIK-FIA Green Helmet Trophy in 1999, with Marta García winning the Academy Trophy and Trofeo delle Industrie in 2015, all in junior classes.) and the first in a global championship since Susanna Raganelli in 1966.

=== Formula 4 (2026) ===
Fluxá debuted in the F4 Spanish Championship in 2026 with Campos.

=== Formula One ===
In February 2022, Fluxá joined the Mercedes Junior Team, aged 11. She was the first female driver to be a part of the academy.

== Karting record ==
=== Karting career summary ===
Season	Series	Team	Position
2018	España Series Rotax — Academy		2nd
2019	Spanish Championship — Alevín		5th
2019	IAME Euro Series — X30 Mini		14th
2019	IAME International Final — Minime Cadet		11th
2019	WSK Final Cup — 60 Mini	Team Driver Racing Kart	74th
2020	WSK Champions Cup — 60 Mini	Kidix	52nd
2020	WSK Super Master Series — 60 Mini	Kidix	25th
2020	IAME Winter Cup — X30 Mini	Praga España Motorsport	26th
2020	South Garda Winter Cup — Mini ROK	Kidix	38th
2020	Champions of the Future — 60 Mini	Kidix	9th
2020	IAME Euro Series — X30 Mini	Fusion Motorsport	8th
2020	International IAME Games — X30 Mini	Fusion Motorsport	15th
2021	WSK Champions Cup — 60 Mini	Kidix	14th
2021	WSK Super Master Series — 60 Mini	Kidix	46th
2021	IAME Euro Series — X30 Mini	MOL by Hiltbrand	1st
2021	WSK Euro Series — 60 Mini	Kidix	58th
2021	IAME Warriors Final — X30 Mini	Fusion Motorsport	7th
2021	International IAME Games — X30 Mini	Fusion Motorsport	9th
2021	WSK Final Cup — 60 Mini	Team Driver Racing Kart	33rd
2022	WSK Super Master Series — OK-J	KR Motorsport	51st
2022	Champions of the Future Winter Series — OK-J	KR Motorsport	21st
2022	Champions of the Future — OK-J	KR Motorsport	52nd
2022	CIK-FIA European Championship — OK-J	KR Motorsport	48th
2022	WSK Euro Series — OK-J	KR Motorsport	82nd
2022	CIK-FIA World Championship — OK-J	KR Motorsport	22nd
2022	WSK Open Cup — OK-J	KR Motorsport	27th
2022	WSK Final Cup — OK-J	KR Motorsport	22nd
2023	WSK Champions Cup — OK-J	KR Motorsport	4th
2023	WSK Super Master Series — OK-J	Prema Racing	31st
2023	Champions of the Future — OK-J	Prema Racing	71st
2023	CIK-FIA European Championship — OK-J	Prema Racing	30th
2023	WSK Euro Series — OK-J	Prema Racing	56th
2023	CIK-FIA World Championship — OK-J	Prema Racing	80th
2023	Champions of the Future — OKN-J		4th
2024	Champions of the Future — OK	Prema Racing	71st
2024	CIK-FIA European Championship — OK	Prema Racing	30th
2024	CIK-FIA World Championship — OK	Prema Racing	48th
2024	Champions of the Future — OK-N		1st
2025	WSK Super Master Series — OK	Prema Racing	60th
2025	CIK-FIA European Championship — OK	Prema Racing	36th
2025	Champions of the Future — OK	Prema Racing	40th
2025	CIK-FIA World Championship — OK	Prema Racing	47th

=== Complete CIK-FIA results ===
==== Complete CIK-FIA Karting World Championship results ====
Year	Entrant	Class	Circuit	QH	SH	F
2022	KR Motorsport	OK-J	(Italy) Sarno	33rd	33rd	22nd
2023	Prema Racing	OK-J	(Italy) Franciacorta	80th	DNQ	DNPQ
2024	Prema Racing	OK	(United Kingdom) PF International	38th	48th	DNQ
2025	Prema Racing	OK	(Sweden) Kristianstad	52nd	47th	DNQ

==== Complete CIK-FIA Karting European Championship results ====
(key) (Races in bold indicate pole position; races in italics indicate fastest lap)

Year	Entrant	Class	1	2	3	4	5	6	7	8	9	10	11	12	Pos	Points
2022	KR Motorsport	OK-J	POR; SH; 60	POR; F DNQ	ZUE; SH; 22	ZUE; F 26	KRI; SH; 52	KRI; F DNQ	FRN; SH; 63	FRN; F DNQ					48th	0
2023	Prema Racing	OK-J	VAL; QH; 17	VAL; SH; 13	VAL; F 14	TŘI; QH; 55	TŘI; SH; 51	TŘI; F DNQ	RØD; QH; 51	RØD; SH; 49	RØD; F DNQ	CRE; QH; 68	CRE; SH; 60	CRE; F DNQ	29th	6
2024	Prema Racing	OK	VAL; QH; 19	VAL; SH; 21	VAL; F 11	ARG; QH; 64	ARG; SH; 47	ARG; F DNQ	SVK; QH; 37	SVK; SH; 28	SVK; F 21	KRI; QH; 44	KRI; SH; 51	KRI; F DNQ	30th	8
2025	Prema Racing	OK	CAM; QH; 61	CAM; SH; 59	CAM; F DNQ	POR; QH; 48	POR; SH; 56	POR; F DNQ	VIT; QH; 63	VIT; SH; 55	VIT; F DNQ	RØD; QH; 24	RØD; SH; 28	RØD; F 13	36th	6

== Racing record ==
=== Racing career summary ===
Season	Series	Team	Races	Wins	Poles	F/Laps	Podiums	Points	Position
2026	Eurocup-4 Spanish Winter Championship	Campos Racing	9	0	0	0	1	27	11th
2026	F4 Spanish Championship	Campos Racing	21	0	0	0	0	6	20th
2026	F1 Academy	Hitech	2	0	0	0	0	10	18th

* Season still in progress.

=== Complete Eurocup-4 Spanish Winter Championship results ===
(key) (Races in bold indicate pole position; races in italics indicate fastest lap)

Year	Entrant	1	2	3	4	5	6	7	8	9	Pos	Points
2026	Campos Racing	POR; 1; 14	POR; SPR; 2	POR; 2; 8	JAR; 1; 11	JAR; SPR; 15	JAR; 2; 23†	ARA; 1; 6	ARA; SPR; 9	ARA; 2; 8	11th	27

=== Complete F4 Spanish Championship results ===
(key) (Races in bold indicate pole position; races in italics indicate fastest lap)

Year	Entrant	1	2	3	4	5	6	7	8	9	10	11	12	13	14	15	16	17	18	19	20	21	Pos	Points
2026	Campos Racing	CRT; 1; 17	CRT; 2; 12	CRT; 3 Ret	POR; 1; 31	POR; 2; 28	POR; 3; 24	ARA; 1; 8	ARA; 2 Ret	ARA; 3; 17	JAR; 1; 29	JAR; 2; 27	JAR; 3 Ret	JER; 1; 21	JER; 2; 20	JER; 3; 14	NAV; 1; 23	NAV; 2; 12	NAV; 3; 9	CAT; 1; 15	CAT; 2; 16	CAT; 3; 14	20th	6

=== Complete F1 Academy results ===
(key) (Races in bold indicate pole position; races in italics indicate points for the fastest lap of the points finishers)

Year	Entrant	1	2	3	4	5	6	7	8	9	10	11	12	13	14	Pos	Points
2026	Hitech	SHA; 1	SHA; 2	MTL; 1	MTL; 2	MTL; 3	SIL; 1	SIL; 2	ZAN; 1	ZAN; 2	COA; 1	COA; 2	COA; 3	LVG; 1	LVG; 2	*	*

* Season still in progress.

== See also ==
- List of female racing drivers
