= Elliot Kaczynski =

Swedish racing driver (born 2010)

- Nationality: (Sweden) Swedish
- Born: 4 June 2010 (age 16) Ängelholm, Sweden

F4 Spanish Championship career
- Debut season: 2026
- Current team: MP Motorsport
- Car number: 44
- Former teams: Drivex
- Starts: 21
- Wins: 2
- Podiums: 4
- Poles: 3
- Fastest laps: 2
- Best finish: 8th in 2026

Previous series
- 2026: Eurocup-4 Spanish Winter
- Statistics up to date as of 16 November 2026.

Elliot Kaczynski (born 4 June 2010) is a Swedish racing driver who is set to compete in the F4 Spanish Championship for MP Motorsport.

== Career ==
=== Karting (2018–2025) ===
Kaczynski began karting in 2018. Starting in micro karts, Kaczynski most notably won the Raket Cup Sweden, the Sydsvenskans Kart Champion Cup and the Kristianstad KK Grande Finale in 2019. Kaczynski then moved up to mini karts, winning the Swedish title in 2020, before finishing runner-up the following year and third in the Sydsvenskans Kart Cup. In parallel, Kaczynski joined Ward Racing for his first full-season in international competitions, winning the Trofeo Delle Industrie and finishing sixth in the WSK Final Cup.

Stepping up to junior karts in 2022, Kaczynski most notably finished ninth in the WSK Open Cup and fourth in the Trofeo Delle Industrie. Staying in the category for 2023, Kaczynski most notably finished second in the South Garda Winter Cup, as well as taking 10th in the Karting European Championship standings. Moving up to senior karts for the following year, Kaczynski had a largely quiet year, in which he most notably finished third in the Swedish Kart Championship. Kaczynski had another quiet season in his final year of karting in 2025, during which he was most notably was disqualified from the final fined 15,000 Swedish kronor in the Swedish Kart Championship after ignoring a black flag.

=== Formula 4 (2026) ===
==== 2026 ====
In late 2025, Kaczynski participated in the Richard Mille Young Talent Academy shootout as one of six finalists for a fully-funded seat in the 2026 F4 Spanish Championship with MP Motorsport. After missing out on the seat, Kaczynski joined Drivex–run DXR to make his single-seater debut in the Eurocup-4 Spanish Winter Championship. In the three-round season, Kaczynski scored his only points at Aragón, by finishing seventh in race one and eighth in the sprint. Continuing in the team for the main Spanish F4 season, Kaczynski began the season with a fifth-place finish at Valencia, before returning to the points two rounds later at Aragón by taking seventh in race three. Following that, Kaczynski won from pole at Jarama, and then ended the year with a double pole and his second win of the season at Barcelona to move up to eighth in overall points.

==== 2027 ====
Kaczynski is set to switch to MP Motorsport for his second Spanish F4 season in 2027.

== Karting record ==
=== Karting career summary ===
Season	Series	Team	Position
2018	Kristianstad KK Grande Finale — Micro		4th
2019	Raket Cup Sweden — Micro		1st
2019	Sydsvenskans Champion Cup — Formula Micro		1st
2019	Juniorfestivalen — Micro		5th
2019	Kristianstad KK Grande Finale — Micro		1st
2020	Swedish League — Junior 60		11th
2020	Swedish Championship — Junior 60		1st
2020	WSK Euro Series — 60 Mini	Ward Racing	33rd
2020	WSK Open Cup — 60 Mini	Ward Racing	49th
2021	WSK Champions Cup — 60 Mini	Ward Racing	31st
2021	WSK Super Master Series — 60 Mini	Ward Racing	31st
2021	WSK Euro Series — 60 Mini	Ward Racing	17th
2021	Andrea Margutti Trophy — 60 Mini	Ward Racing	34th
2021	WSK Open Cup — 60 Mini	Ward Racing	13th
2021	Trofeo delle Industrie — 60 Mini	Ward Racing	1st
2021	WSK Final Cup — 60 Mini	Ward Racing	6th
2021	Swedish League — Junior 60		5th
2021	Swedish Championship — Junior 60	KAK/S Motorsport	2nd
2021	Sydsvenskans Champion Cup — Formula Mini		17th
2021	Sydsvenskans Cup — Junior 60		3rd
2021	Italian Championship — Mini Gr.3		80th
2022	WSK Super Master Series — OK-J	Ward Racing	17th
2022	Champions of the Future — OK-J	Ward Racing	27th
2022	CIK-FIA European Championship — OK-J	Ward Racing	32nd
2022	WSK Euro Series — OK-J	Ward Racing	55th
2022	Italian Championship — OK-J	Ward Racing	NC
2022	CIK-FIA World Championship — OK-J	Ward Racing	85th
2022	WSK Open Cup — OK-J	Ward Racing	9th
2022	Trofeo delle Industrie — OK-J	Ward Racing	4th
2022	WSK Final Cup — OK-J	Ward Racing	24th
2023	South Garda Winter Cup — OK-J	Ward Racing	2nd
2023	WSK Super Master Series — OK-J	Ward Racing	10th
2023	Champions of the Future — OK-J	Ward Racing	17th
2023	CIK-FIA European Championship — OK-J	Ward Racing	10th
2023	Italian Championship — OK-J	Ward Racing	3rd
2023	WSK Euro Series — OK-J	Ward Racing	10th
2023	CIK-FIA World Championship — OK-J	Ward Racing	49th
2023	WSK Final Cup — OK-J	Ward Racing	12th
2024	WSK Super Master Series — OK	Ward Racing	18th
2024	Champions of the Future — OK	Ward Racing	46th
2024	CIK-FIA European Championship — OK	Ward Racing	59th
2024	CIK-FIA World Championship — OK	Ward Racing	47th
2024	WSK Euro Series — OK	Ward Racing	17th
2024	WSK Final Cup — OK	Ward Racing	15th
2024	Swedish Championship — Senior 125		3rd
2024	Sydsvenskans Champion Cup — Senior 125		4th
2025	WSK Super Master Series — OK	Ward Racing	18th
2025	Champions of the Future — OK	Ward Racing	80th
2025	CIK-FIA European Championship — OK	Ward Racing	22nd
2025	WSK Euro Series — OK	Ward Racing	14th
2025	CIK-FIA World Championship — OK	Ward Racing	32nd

== Racing record ==
=== Racing career summary ===
Season	Series	Team	Races	Wins	Poles	F/Laps	Podiums	Points	Position
2026	Eurocup-4 Spanish Winter Championship	DXR	9	0	0	0	0	9	18th
2026	F4 Spanish Championship	Drivex	21	2	3	3	4	131	8th
2027	F4 Spanish Championship	MP Motorsport	0	0	0	0	0	0	TBD

=== Complete Eurocup-4 Spanish Winter Championship results ===
(key) (Races in bold indicate pole position; races in italics indicate fastest lap)

Year	Entrant	1	2	3	4	5	6	7	8	9	Pos	Points
2026	DXR	POR; 1; 20	POR; SPR; 17	POR; 2; 25	JAR; 1; 23	JAR; SPR; Ret	JAR; 2; 15	ARA; 1; 7	ARA; SPR; 8	ARA; 2 Ret	18th	9

=== Complete F4 Spanish Championship results ===
(key) (Races in bold indicate pole position; races in italics indicate fastest lap)

Year	Entrant	1	2	3	4	5	6	7	8	9	10	11	12	13	14	15	16	17	18	19	20	21	Pos	Points
2026	Drivex	CRT; 1; 5	CRT; 2 Ret	CRT; 3 Ret	POR; 1; 28	POR; 2; 12	POR; 3; 13	ARA; 1; 28	ARA; 2; 27	ARA; 3; 7	JAR; 1; 5	JAR; 2 Ret	**JAR**; **3**; 1	JER; 1; 11	JER; 2; 3	JER; 3; 6	NAV; 1; 4	NAV; 2; 6	NAV; 3; 27	**CAT**; **1**; 17	**CAT**; **2**; 1	CAT; 3; 2	8th	131

* Season still in progress.
