= Noah Monteiro =

Portuguese racing driver (born 2009)

- Born: Noah Pereira Monteiro; 23 November 2009 (age 16); Coimbra, Portugal
- Parents: Tiago Monteiro (father); Diana Pereira (mother)
- Nationality: (Portugal) Portuguese

F4 Spanish Championship career
- Debut season: 2025
- Current team: Campos Racing
- Car number: 81
- Starts: 42
- Wins: 2
- Podiums: 9
- Poles: 4
- Fastest laps: 3
- Best finish: 2nd in 2026

Previous series
- 2025–2026; 2025–2026: F4 Spanish; Eurocup-4 Spanish Winter

Championship titles
- 2026: Eurocup-4 Spanish Winter
- Statistics up to date as of 10 November 2026.

Noah Pereira Monteiro (Portuguese pronunciation: [ˈno.ɐ peˈɾej.ɾɐ mõˈtɐj.ɾu]; born 23 November 2009) is a Portuguese racing driver who last competed in the F4 Spanish Championship for Campos Racing.

Born in Coimbra, Monteiro is the son of former Formula One driver Tiago Monteiro and model Diana Pereira. He began competitive kart racing aged seven, winning several national titles and achieving podiums in the European Championship before graduating to junior formulae in 2025. After finishing eighth in Spanish F4 that year, he took his maiden F4 title in the Eurocup-4 Spanish Winter Championship.

== Early life ==
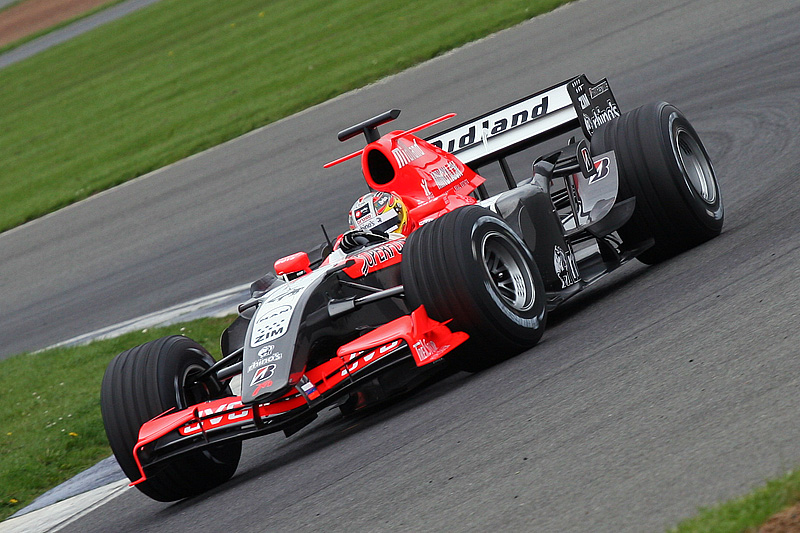
Monteiro is the son of former Formula One driver Tiago Monteiro (pictured in 2006) and his model ex-wife, Diana Pereira.

Noah Pereira Monteiro was born on 23 November 2009 at 00:40 WET in Coimbra, Portugal. His father, Tiago Monteiro, is a fellow racing driver who competed in Formula One from 2005 to 2006 with Jordan and Midland before an extensive career in the World Touring Car Championship. His mother, Diana Pereira, is a former model, rally driver, fashion designer, and motorsport broadcaster—she was named the Ford Supermodel of the World in 1997. He has an older sister called Mel, who appeared on the Portuguese version of The Voice Kids.

Monteiro was introduced to motor racing by attending his father's V8 Supercar event in Australia and first tested a go-kart by the age of five. He had initially tried skateboarding, surfing, motocross, basketball, and fashion modelling. His father took a relaxed approach towards his karting career, which The Race likened to the relationship of Keke and Nico Rosberg. He has been partnered with automotive supplier Brose Fahrzeugteile since 2020 and studies at an economics school. He has been mentored by 2019–20 Formula E champion António Félix da Costa, a close friend of his father. He featured on the cover of GQ Portugal in October 2024, where he was interviewed by his mother.

== Racing career ==
=== Karting (2017–2024) ===
==== 2017–2020: National champion in Portugal ====
Monteiro began competitive kart racing in 2017, contesting national championships in Portugal, aged seven. He finished sixth on debut in the Micro Max category of the Troféu Rotax Portugal that year—driving an FA Kart chassis—as well as claiming twelfth in the Cadete class of the Taça de Portugal. (Note: lit. 'Cadet', for drivers aged six to 10.) He joined his father's Skywalker Young Guns development programme in 2018 and remained in Cadete, where he finished thirteenth the Open de Portugal and eighth in the Portuguese Championship. He retired from the final of the Taça de Portugal in a multi-kart collision involving Maria Germano Neto, (Note: Did not finish, but was classified thirteenth.) before claiming runner-up to her in the Troféu Bridgestone.

Monteiro narrowly finished runner-up to Germano in the 2019 Portuguese Championship, further claiming back-to-back victories at Viana do Castelo ahead of Christian Costoya on his return to the Troféu Rotax, third in the Copa Rotax España, and fifth in the Open de Portugal. He opened his 2020 campaign in Juvenil with his maiden title at the Open de Portugal, (Note: lit. 'Juvenile', for drivers aged eight to 12.) before winning the Portuguese Championship, where he had been disqualified from the fourth round before an appeal saw him claim the title. He was further awarded the Prémio Ética by the FPAK. (Note: lit. 'Fair-Play Award') He made his debut in international competition that year at the IAME Winter Cup in Valencia, claiming twentieth in X30 Mini.

==== 2021–2024: Podiums in international competition ====
Monteiro expanded his international career from 2021 onwards, joining Victorylane in the IAME Winter Cup and Euro Series, where he finished eighteenth and twelfth in X30 Junior, respectively. The FPAK selected him to represent Portugal as one of the youngest drivers in the Academy Trophy, finishing 29th on his CIK-FIA debut as he was disqualified from the Adria round, and he closed his season with sixteenth in the International IAME Games. He overcame a missed round due to a broken arm to win his second Portuguese Championship that year in the Júnior class and appeared in the IAME Series Benelux. He opened 2022 with fourth at the Narciso Gil Trophy, alongside further appearances in the IAME Series: 30th in the Winter Cup, eighth in the Euro Series, fourth in the Benelux Series, and fifteenth in the Warriors Final; he further became champion of the France Series and entered the Italian Championship.

Joining the factory-backed Kart Republic in 2023, Monteiro progressed to OK-Junior—the premier under-15 international category. On his European Championship debut, he clinched 27th overall with a tenth-placed finish at Cremona, and ended the World Championship at Franciacorta in 24th. He additionally finished thirteenth in the IAME Winter Cup, 28th in Champions of the Future, and 31st in the WSK Final Cup, the latter marking his debut in the senior OK class. In 2024—his final season in karting—Monteiro claimed his first pole position in the European Championship at Slovakia, ending second to Thibaut Ramaekers in both the heats and final; he closed the season eighth overall. He clinched fourteenth overall in Champions of the Future before retiring from the wet-weather final of the World Championship at PF International, his final appearance, after three podiums in the heats.

=== Formula 4 (2025–present) ===
==== 2025: Rookie season ====
During the AutoClássico festival on 4 October 2024, it was revealed that Monteiro would advance to junior formulae in 2025. Four days later, Campos Racing announced Monteiro would join them for both the Eurocup-4 Spanish Winter and F4 Spanish Championships. He first tested Formula 4 machinery at Valencia. In the three-round Winter Championship, Monteiro took his first points at Jerez—where he claimed his maiden rookie podium—before scoring his only overall podium at Portimão by finishing third in race two, which enabled him to finish ninth in points.

In the Spanish Championship, Monteiro took pole for the season-opening round at Aragón and finished third in race one, also scoring the rookie win, but was stripped of both after he was given a 25-second penalty for overtaking under the safety car, thus relegating him to twentieth. In the following round at Navarra, Monteiro scored two rookie wins by finishing eighth and sixth in the first two races of the weekend. Multiple points finishes in each the Portimão, Paul Ricard, and Jerez rounds—with season-best fourth-places in the latter two events—solidified his eighth-position overall, one point shy of Reno Francot, while he became the highest-scoring Portuguese driver in a Formula 4 season. A triple points haul by Monteiro at Valencia was outmatched by a podium for Francot, leaving Monteiro now 13 points behind seventh-placed Nathan Tye. At the season-ending Barcelona-Catalunya round, Monteiro claimed fifth in race one before dropping outside the points with twelfth from 22nd on the race two grid, and a mechanical retirement in the third. He ended the season eighth overall on 97 points—295 shy of champion Thomas Strauven—with one pole position; he finished runner-up to Ean Eyckmans in the rookies' standings. After his rookie season, Fábio Mendes of AutoSport.pt described Monteiro as "one of the greatest hopes for [Portuguese] motorsport".

==== 2026: Maiden title in F4 ====
Monteiro remained with Campos for his 2026 campaign in Spain and has stated his intention to fight for the title. Opening his season in the Winter Championship at Portimão, he finished fourth—having started thirty-first following technical issues in qualifying—and second in the feature races, as well as tenth in the sprint. The Jarama round saw Monteiro claim his first victories in F4, winning both features from pole position and pulling a 26-point advantage over Nathan Tye. He solidified this lead with second in the opening Aragón race, before clinching the title when post-race penalties were applied to the frontrunners in the sprint; he closed his pre-season with sixth in race two. Monteiro ended the Winter Championship with two victories, poles, and fastest laps each from four podiums, winning his maiden F4 title on 116 points—35 ahead of Tye and 37 ahead of Andrej Petrović.

In the Spanish Championship, Monteiro finished third in all three races at Valencia, before qualifying on pole and finishing third in race two of the following round at Portimão. Monteiro then finished no lower than fourth at Aragón, a round in which he finished second in race three to take the points lead, before a double points finish at Jarama relegated him to fourth. In the following round at Jerez, Monteiro bounced back to win the first two races from pole and finishing third in race three to move back up to second, four points behind Kasper Schormans. Following that, Monteiro took a best result of second at Navarra, before a quiet round in Barcelona sealed runner-up honours in the championship, 48 points behind Schormans.

== Karting record ==
=== Karting career summary ===
Season	Series	Team	Position
2017	Troféu Rotax Portugal — Micro Max		6th
2017	Taça de Portugal — Cadete		12th
2018	Open de Portugal — Cadete		13th
2018	Portuguese Championship — Cadete		8th
2018	Taça de Portugal — Cadete		NC
2018	Troféu Bridgestone — Cadete		2nd
2019	Open de Portugal — Cadete		5th
2019	Troféu Rotax Portugal — Micro Max		11th
2019	Copa Rotax España — Micro Max		3rd
2019	Portuguese Championship — Cadete		2nd
2020	IAME Winter Cup — X30 Mini	Monlau Karting Team	20th
2020	Open de Portugal — Juvenil	Tiago Monteiro	1st
2020	Portuguese Championship — Juvenil	Cabo do Mundo Karteam	1st
2021	IAME Winter Cup — X30 Junior	Victorylane	18th
2021	IAME Euro Series — X30 Junior	Victorylane	12th
2021	CIK-FIA Academy Trophy	FPAK	29th
2021	IAME Series Benelux — X30 Junior		65th
2021	Portuguese Championship — Júnior		1st
2021	International IAME Games — X30 Junior	Cabo do Mundo Karteam	16th
2022	IAME Winter Cup — X30 Junior	Victorylane	30th
2022	Narciso Gil Trophy — X30 Junior	Victorylane	4th
2022	IAME Series France — X30 Junior	Victorylane	1st
2022	Italian Championship — X30 Junior		21st
2022	IAME Euro Series — X30 Junior	Victorylane	8th
2022	IAME Series Benelux — X30 Junior	Victorylane	4th
2022	IAME Warriors Final — X30 Junior	Victorylane	15th
2023	IAME Winter Cup — X30 Junior	KR Motorsport	13th
2023	WSK Super Master Series — OK-J	KR Motorsport	NC†
2023	CIK-FIA European Championship — OK-J	KR Motorsport	27th
2023	WSK Euro Series — OK-J	KR Motorsport	NC†
2023	Champions of the Future — OK-J	KR Motorsport	28th
2023	CIK-FIA World Championship — OK-J	KR Motorsport	24th
2023	WSK Final Cup — OK	KR Motorsport	31st
2024	IAME Winter Cup — X30 Senior	Victorylane	NC
2024	CIK-FIA European Championship — OK	KR Motorsport	8th
2024	Champions of the Future — OK	KR Motorsport	14th
2024	CIK-FIA World Championship — OK	KR Motorsport	18th
Source: (Note: Additional references are stated in § Karting (2017–2024).)

^{†} As Monteiro was a guest driver, he was ineligible for championship points.

=== Complete CIK-FIA results ===
==== Complete CIK-FIA Karting World Championship results ====
Year	Entrant	Class	Circuit	QH	SH	F
2023	KR Motorsport	OK-J	(Italy) Franciacorta	22nd	22nd	24th
2024	KR Motorsport	OK	(United Kingdom) PF International	8th	17th	Ret (Note: Did not finish, but was classified 18th.)

==== Complete CIK-FIA Karting European Championship results ====
(key) (Races in bold indicate pole position; races in italics indicate fastest lap)

Year	Entrant	Class	1	2	3	4	5	6	7	8	9	10	11	12	Pos	Points
2023	KR Motorsport	OK-J	VAL; QH; 18	VAL; SH; 14	VAL; F 36†	TŘI; QH; 43	TŘI; SH; 40	TŘI; F DNQ	RØD; QH; 25	RØD; SH; 24	RØD; F 19	CRE; QH; 17	CRE; SH; 16	CRE; F 10	27th	8
2024	KR Motorsport	OK	VAL; QH; 29	VAL; SH; 24	VAL; F 27	ARG; QH; 33	ARG; SH; 29	ARG; F 13	**SVK**; **QH**; 5	SVK; SH; 2	SVK; F 2	KRI; QH; 10	KRI; SH; 8	KRI; F 9	8th	120

^{†} Did not finish, but was classified as he had completed at least one lap.

== Racing record ==
=== Racing career summary ===
Season	Series	Team	Races	Wins	Poles	F/Laps	Podiums	Points	Position
2025	Eurocup-4 Spanish Winter Championship	Campos Racing	9	0	0	0	1	32	9th
2025	F4 Spanish Championship	Campos Racing	21	0	1	0	0	97	8th
2026	Eurocup-4 Spanish Winter Championship	Griffin Core	9	2	2	2	4	116	1st
2026	F4 Spanish Championship	Griffin Core	21	2	3	3	9	210	2nd
2026	FIA F4 World Cup	SJM Theodore Racing	2	0	0	0	0	—N/a	10th

=== Complete Eurocup-4 Spanish Winter Championship results ===
(key) (Races in bold indicate pole position; races in italics indicate fastest lap)

Year	Entrant	1	2	3	4	5	6	7	8	9	Pos	Points
2025	Campos Racing	JER; 1; 13	JER; SPR; 12	JER; 2; 7	POR; 1; 4	POR; SPR; 3	POR; 2; 32	NAV; 1; 9	NAV; SPR; 11	NAV; 2; 12	9th	32
2026	Griffin Core	POR; 1; 4	POR; SPR; 10	POR; 2; 2	**JAR**; **1**; 1	JAR; SPR; 8	**JAR**; **2**; 1	ARA; 1; 2	ARA; SPR; 27	ARA; 2; 6	1st	116

=== Complete F4 Spanish Championship results ===
(key) (Races in bold indicate pole position; races in italics indicate fastest lap)

Year	Entrant	1	2	3	4	5	6	7	8	9	10	11	12	13	14	15	16	17	18	19	20	21	Pos	Points
2025	Campos Racing	**ARA**; **1**; 20	ARA; 2; 4	ARA; 3; 6	NAV; 1; 8	NAV; 2; 6	NAV; 3 Ret	POR; 1; 7	POR; 2; 10	POR; 3; 5	LEC; 1; 10	LEC; 2 Ret	LEC; 3; 4	JER; 1; 5	JER; 2; 10	JER; 3; 4	CRT; 1; 8	CRT; 2; 9	CRT; 3; 10	CAT; 1; 5	CAT; 2; 12	CAT; 3 Ret	8th	97
2026	Griffin Core	CRT; 1; 3	CRT; 2; 3	CRT; 3; 3	POR; 1; 8	**POR**; **2**; 3	POR; 3; 18	ARA; 1; 4	ARA; 2; 4	ARA; 3; 2	JAR; 1; 28	JAR; 2; 5	JAR; 3; 7	**JER**; **1**; 1	**JER**; **2**; 1	JER; 3; 3	NAV; 1; 6	NAV; 2; 8	NAV; 3; 2	CAT; 1; 7	CAT; 2; 27	CAT; 3; 10	2nd	210

=== Complete FIA F4 World Cup results ===
Year	Entrant	Car	Qualifying	Quali race	Main race
2026	(Macau) SJM Theodore Racing	Tatuus F4-T421	9th	4th	10th
