= Nacho Tuñón =

Spanish racing driver (born 2007)

- Nationality: (Spain) Spanish
- Born: 1 April 2007 (age 19) Oviedo, Spain

F4 Spanish Championship career
- Debut season: 2025
- Current team: T-Code
- Car number: 17
- Former teams: Tecnicar by Amtog
- Starts: 42
- Wins: 2
- Podiums: 4
- Poles: 0
- Fastest laps: 2
- Best finish: 9th in 2026

Nacho Tuñón García (born 1 April 2007) is a Spanish racing driver who last competed in the F4 Spanish Championship for T-Code.

== Career ==
Tuñón began karting at an early age, in which he participated in the 2015 FA Karting Camp prior to his competitive debut. Starting out in mini karts, Tuñón most notably won the 2018 Asturias Karting Championship in the Alevin category. Moving up to junior karts for the next three seasons, Tuñón won the Asturias Karting Championship in 2019, before stepping up to senior karts for the next two seasons, as well as making his KZ2 debut in mid-2023 and racing in it until 2024.

In 2025, Tuñón made the step-up to single-seaters, as he joined Tecnicar by Amtog to race in the final two rounds of the Eurocup-4 Spanish Winter Championship and the full F4 Spanish Championship season. After taking a best result of 11th in the former at Algarve, Tuñón scored a best result of 12th twice at Valencia in the main campaign en route to 26th in overall points.

The following year, Tuñón continued with Tecnicar for a dual campaign in the Eurocup-4 Spanish Winter and F4 Spanish Championships, under their T-Code banner. Tuñón began the former by taking his maiden career podium at Algarve, which turned out to be his only one in the three-round series as he finished ninth in points. In the main series, Tuñón took his maiden win in race three at Algarve in Tecnicar's first 1-2 finish, before losing the win on post-race penalties and later having it reinstated following an appeal. Tuñón followed that up with a win in race one of the following round at Aragón, as well as two extra podiums to end the year ninth overall on 113 points. During 2026, Tuñón also raced with Tecnicar on a part-time basis in Eurocup-3, in which he ran as high as eighth in race two at Imola but retired on the final lap after incurring a puncture.

== Karting record ==
=== Karting career summary ===
Season	Series	Team	Position
2017	Spanish Karting Championship — Alevin		8th
2017	Asturias Karting Championship — Alevin		2nd
2018	Spanish Karting Championship — Alevin		6th
2018	Asturias Karting Championship — Alevin		1st
2018	Trofeo Delle Industrie — 60 Mini		34th
2019	South Garda Winter Cup — OK-J	DPK Racing	25th
2019	Spanish Karting Championship — Junior		10th
2019	Asturias Karting Championship — Junior		1st
2019	Karting European Championship — OK-J	DPK Racing	114th
2019	Karting World Championship — OK-J	DPK Racing	89th
2020	South Garda Winter Cup — OK-J	DPK Racing	46th
2020	Champions of the Future — OK-J	DPK Racing	44th
2020	Karting European Championship — OK-J	DPK Racing	94th
2020	Karting World Championship — OK-J	DPK Racing	40th
2021	Champions of the Future — OK-J	DPK Racing	64th
2021	Karting European Championship — OK-J	DPK Racing	44th
2021	WSK Euro Series — OK-J	DPK Racing	114th
2021	Karting World Championship — OK-J	DPK Racing	48th
2022	Spanish Karting Championship — OK		6th
2022	Champions of the Future Euro Series — OK	DPK Racing	59th
2022	Karting European Championship — OK	DPK Racing	58th
2022	WSK Euro Series — OK	DPK Racing	67th
2022	Italian Karting Championship — OK	DPK Racing	13th
2022	Karting World Championship — OK	DPK Racing	15th
2023	Champions of the Future Euro Series — OK	Leclerc by Lennox Racing; DPK Racing (Note: Tuñón competed for Leclerc by Lennox Racing in round 1 and for DPK Racing in rounds 2–5.)	33rd
2023	Karting European Championship — OK	DPK Racing	67th
2023	Karting European Championship — KZ2	DPK Racing	81st
2023	WSK Euro Series — OK	DPK Racing	37th
2023	Karting World Cup — KZ2	DPK Racing	74th
2023	Karting World Championship — OK	DPK Racing	27th
2024	WSK Champions Cup — KZ2	DPK Racing	20th
2024	WSK Super Master Series — KZ2	DPK Racing	51st
2024	Spanish Karting Championship — KZ		72nd
2024	Karting European Championship — KZ2	DPK Racing	18th
2024	Champions of the Future Shifters — KZ2	DPK Racing	15th
2024	Karting World Championship — KZ2	DPK Racing	49th

== Racing record ==
=== Racing career summary ===
Season	Series	Team	Races	Wins	Poles	F/Laps	Podiums	Points	Position
2025	Eurocup-4 Spanish Winter Championship	Tecnicar by Amtog	6	0	0	0	0	0	22nd
2025	F4 Spanish Championship	Tecnicar by Amtog	21	0	0	0	0	0	26th
2026	Eurocup-4 Spanish Winter Championship	T-Code	9	0	0	0	1	40	9th
2026	F4 Spanish Championship	T-Code	21	2	0	2	4	113	9th
2026	Eurocup-3	Tecnicar by Amtog	5	0	0	0	0	0	42nd

^{†} As Tuñón was a guest driver, he was ineligible to score points.

=== Complete Eurocup-4 Spanish Winter Championship results ===
(key) (Races in bold indicate pole position) (Races in italics indicate fastest lap)

Year	Team	1	2	3	4	5	6	7	8	9	DC	Points
2025	Tecnicar by Amtog	JER; 1	JER; 2	JER; 3	POR; 1; 11	POR; 2; 23	POR; 3; 19	NAV; 1; 15	NAV; 2; 20	NAV; 3 Ret	22nd	0
2026	T-Code	POR; 1; 3	POR; SPR; 8	POR; 2; 6	JAR; 1; 4	JAR; SPR; 9	JAR; 2; 19	ARA; 1; 18	ARA; SPR; 12	ARA; 2 Ret	9th	40

=== Complete F4 Spanish Championship results ===
(key) (Races in bold indicate pole position; races in italics indicate fastest lap)

Year	Team	1	2	3	4	5	6	7	8	9	10	11	12	13	14	15	16	17	18	19	20	21	DC	Points
2025	Tecnicar by Amtog	ARA; 1; 17	ARA; 2; 35	ARA; 3; 21	NAV; 1; 18	NAV; 2; 27	NAV; 3 Ret	POR; 1; 16	POR; 2; 17	POR; 3; 19	LEC; 1; 29	LEC; 2; 18	LEC; 3; 17	JER; 1; 27	JER; 2; 25	JER; 3; 16	CRT; 1; 12	CRT; 2; 12	CRT; 3; 16	CAT; 1; 32	CAT; 2; 15	CAT; 3; 22	26th	0
2026	T-Code	CRT; 1; 30	CRT; 2; 8	CRT; 3; 15	POR; 1; 5	POR; 2; 6	POR; 3; 1	ARA; 1; 1	ARA; 2; 3	ARA; 3; 4	JAR; 1; 10	JAR; 2; 8	JAR; 3 Ret	JER; 1; 10	JER; 2; 22	JER; 3; 11	NAV; 1; 14	NAV; 2; 34	NAV; 3; 31	CAT; 1; 23	CAT; 2; 30†	CAT; 3; 3	9th	113

=== Complete Eurocup-3 results ===
(key) (Races in bold indicate pole position; races in italics indicate fastest lap)

Year	Team	1	2	3	4	5	6	7	8	9	10	11	12	13	14	15	16	17	18	19	DC	Points
2026	Tecnicar by Amtog	LEC; 1	LEC; SR	LEC; 2	POR; 1	POR; 2	IMO; 1; 19	IMO; SR; 21	IMO; 2; 24†	MNZ; 1	MNZ; 2	SIL; 1; 20	SIL; 2; 19	JER; 1	JER; SR	JER; 2	HUN; 1	HUN; 2	CAT; 1	CAT; 2	42nd	0

* Season still in progress.
