= Jacob Micallef =

Maltese racing driver (born 2009)

- Nationality: (Malta) Maltese
- Born: 28 October 2009 (age 17) Malta

F4 Spanish Championship career
- Debut season: 2026
- Current team: Campos Racing
- Car number: 8
- Starts: 21
- Wins: 0
- Podiums: 1
- Poles: 1
- Fastest laps: 0
- Best finish: 13th in 2026

Previous series
- 2026 2026 2025: GB3; Eurocup-4 Spanish Winter; F4 Saudi Arabian
- Statistics up to date as of 9 November 2026.

Jacob Micallef (born 28 October 2009) is a Maltese racing driver who last competed in the F4 Spanish Championship with Campos Racing and part-time in the GB3 Championship for Hitech.

== Personal life ==
Micallef is the son of former drag racer and 2017 FIA European Top Fuel champion Duncan Micallef, and is also the brother of fellow kart racer Kyle Micallef.

In March 2026, Micallef won the Youth of the Year award at the 66th Malta National Sports Choices in recognition of his achievements representing Malta in international motorsport.

== Career ==
=== Karting (2017–2025) ===
Micallef began karting at the age of eight, competing until 2025. After finishing third in the 2021 Malta National Karting Championship in the 60cc class, Micallef made his international karting debut the following year, racing in the Italian Karting Championship and the Trofeo Delle Industrie. The following year, Micallef joined Ward Racing for his first full year in International karting as he remained in junior karts. In his only year with Ward Racing, Micallef most notably finished eighth in the Andrea Margutti Trophy and tenth in the ROK Cup Superfinal.

Stepping up to senior karting for 2024, Micallef raced with CRG Racing Team for the first half of the year, before switching to VictoryLane and later KR Motorsport to round out the year. During 2024, Micallef also raced with Zanchi Motorsport, finishing second in the ROK SVR class of the Rok Cup Superfinal, and also making a one-off appearance in IAME Series Italy at Lonato, which he won after starting third. Micallef also represented Malta in that year's FIA Motorsport Games Karting Sprint Senior discipline, in which he finished eighth.

Remaining with KR Motorsport for his sophomore season in senior karts, Micallef began the year by finishing 11th in the WSK Super Master Series standings, before finishing third in the Viterbo round of the Karting European Championship en route to a 14th-place points finish. During 2025, Micallef also made one-off appearances in the IAME Euro Series and Champions of the Future Academy Program, finishing third in the former and winning race two in the latter.

=== Formula 4 (2025–) ===
Micallef made his single-seater debut in the season-opening round of the F4 Saudi Arabian Championship in Bahrain, finishing ninth and seventh in the two races. A month after his single-seater debut, Micallef joined Campos Racing to compete in the following year's Eurocup-4 Spanish Winter and F4 Spanish Championships. In the three-round Winter Championship, Micallef scored a best result of fifth in race two at Jarama, as the third-highest finishing rookie. In the main series, Micallef qualified on pole at Algarve and took his only podium of the season at Jarama to end the year 13th overall.

=== GB3 Championship (2026) ===
In June 2026, Hitech announced that Micallef would join the GB3 Championship for selected rounds starting at the Hungaroring, becoming the first Maltese driver to compete in the series. His part-time campaign was headlined by maiden single-seater victory at Silverstone in the reversed-grid third race after overtaking Rodrigo González on the final lap.

== Karting record ==
=== Karting career summary ===
Season	Series	Team	Position
2021	Malta National Karting Championship — 60cc		3rd
2022	Italian Karting Championship — X30 Junior	BRM Official Racing Team	NC
2022	Trofeo Delle Industrie — X30 Junior	BRM Official Racing Team	30th
2023	WSK Super Master Series — OK-J	Ward Racing	102nd
2023	Andrea Margutti Trophy — OK-J	Ward Racing	8th
2023	Champions of the Future Euro Series — OK-J	Ward Racing	127th
2023	Karting European Championship — OK-J	Ward Racing	NC
2023	WSK Euro Series — OK-J	Ward Racing	42nd
2023	Italian Karting Championship — OK-J	Ward Racing	17th
2023	Karting World Championship — OK-J	Ward Racing	39th
2023	ROK Cup Superfinal — Junior ROK	Ward Racing	10th
2023	WSK Final Cup — OK-J	Ward Racing	42nd
2024	WSK Champions Cup — OK	CRG Racing Team	18th
2024	WSK Super Master Series — OK	CRG Racing Team	62nd
2024	WSK Euro Series — OK	CRG Racing Team	42nd
2024	Champions of the Future Euro Series — OK	CRG Racing Team; VictoryLane (Note: Micallef competed for CRG Racing Team in rounds 1–2 and for VictoryLane in rounds 4–5.)	59th
2024	Karting European Championship — OK	CRG Racing Team; VictoryLane (Note: Micallef competed for CRG Racing Team in rounds 1–2 and for VictoryLane in round 4.)	36th
2024	Champions of the Future Academy Program — OK-N		16th
2024	Karting World Championship — OK	VictoryLane	NC
2024	ROK Cup Superfinal — ROK SVR	Zanchi Motorsport	2nd
2024	IAME Warriors Final — X30 Senior	Zanchi Motorsport	NC
2024	WSK Final Cup — OK	KR Motorsport	12th
2024	FIA Motorsport Games Karting Sprint Senior	Team Malta	8th
2025	WSK Super Master Series — OK	KR Motorsport	11th
2025	Champions of the Future Euro Series — OK	KR Motorsport	22nd
2025	Karting European Championship — OK	KR Motorsport	14th
2025	Karting World Championship — OK	KR Motorsport	21st
2025	IAME Euro Series — X30 Senior	Zanchi Motorsport	17th
2025	Champions of the Future Academy Program — OK-N		15th

== Racing record ==
=== Racing career summary ===
Season	Series	Team	Races	Wins	Poles	F/Laps	Podiums	Points	Position
2025	F4 Saudi Arabian Championship	Team Zahid	2	0	0	0	0	8	16th
2026	Eurocup-4 Spanish Winter Championship	Campos Racing	9	0	0	0	0	11	15th
2026	F4 Spanish Championship	Campos Racing	21	0	1	0	1	38	13th
2026	GB3 Championship	Hitech	12	1	0	1	1	129	16th

* Season still in progress.

=== Complete F4 Saudi Arabian Championship results ===
(key) (Races in bold indicate pole position) (Races in italics indicate fastest lap)

Year	Entrant	1	2	3	4	5	6	7	8	9	10	Pos	Points	Points
2025	Zahid	BHR1; 1; 9	BHR1; 2; 7	BHR2; 1	BHR2; 2	JED1; 1	JED1; 2	JED2; 1	JED2; 2	JED3; 1	JED3; 2	16th	8	

=== Complete Eurocup-4 Spanish Winter Championship results ===
(key) (Races in bold indicate pole position; races in italics indicate fastest lap)

Year	Entrant	1	2	3	4	5	6	7	8	9	Pos	Points
2026	Campos Racing	POR; 1; 12	POR; SPR; 26	POR; 2 Ret	JAR; 1; 13	JAR; SPR; 13	JAR; 2; 5	ARA; 1 Ret	ARA; SPR; 10	ARA; 2; 21	15th	11

=== Complete F4 Spanish Championship results ===
(key) (Races in bold indicate pole position; races in italics indicate fastest lap)

Year	Entrant	1	2	3	4	5	6	7	8	9	10	11	12	13	14	15	16	17	18	19	20	21	Pos	Points
2026	Campos Racing	CRT; 1; 22	CRT; 2; 13	CRT; 3; 13	**POR**; **1**; 27	POR; 2; 8	POR; 3; 6	ARA; 1 Ret	ARA; 2; 7	ARA; 3; 10	JAR; 1; 3	JAR; 2; 7	JAR; 3; 13	JER; 1; 9	JER; 2; 23	JER; 3; 20	NAV; 1; 30	NAV; 2; 22	NAV; 3; 30	CAT; 1; 14	CAT; 2; 13	CAT; 3; 13	13th	38

=== Complete GB3 Championship results ===
(key) (Races in bold indicate pole position; races in italics indicate fastest lap)

Year	Entrant	1	2	3	4	5	6	7	8	9	10	11	12	13	14	15	16	17	18	19	20	21	22	23	24	Pos	Points
2026	Hitech	SIL1; 1	SIL1; 2	SIL1; 3	SPA; 1	SPA; 2	SPA; 3	HUN; 1; 9	HUN; 2; 14	HUN; 3; 6	RBR; 1; 11	RBR; 2; 18	RBR; 3; 10^{9}	SIL2; 1; 9	SIL2; 2; 11	SIL2; 3; 1^{2}	DON; 1; 11	DON; 2; 12	DON; 3; 10^{3}	BRH; 1	BRH; 2	BRH; 3	CAT; 1	CAT; 2	CAT; 3	16th	129
