= Vivek Kanthan =

American racing driver

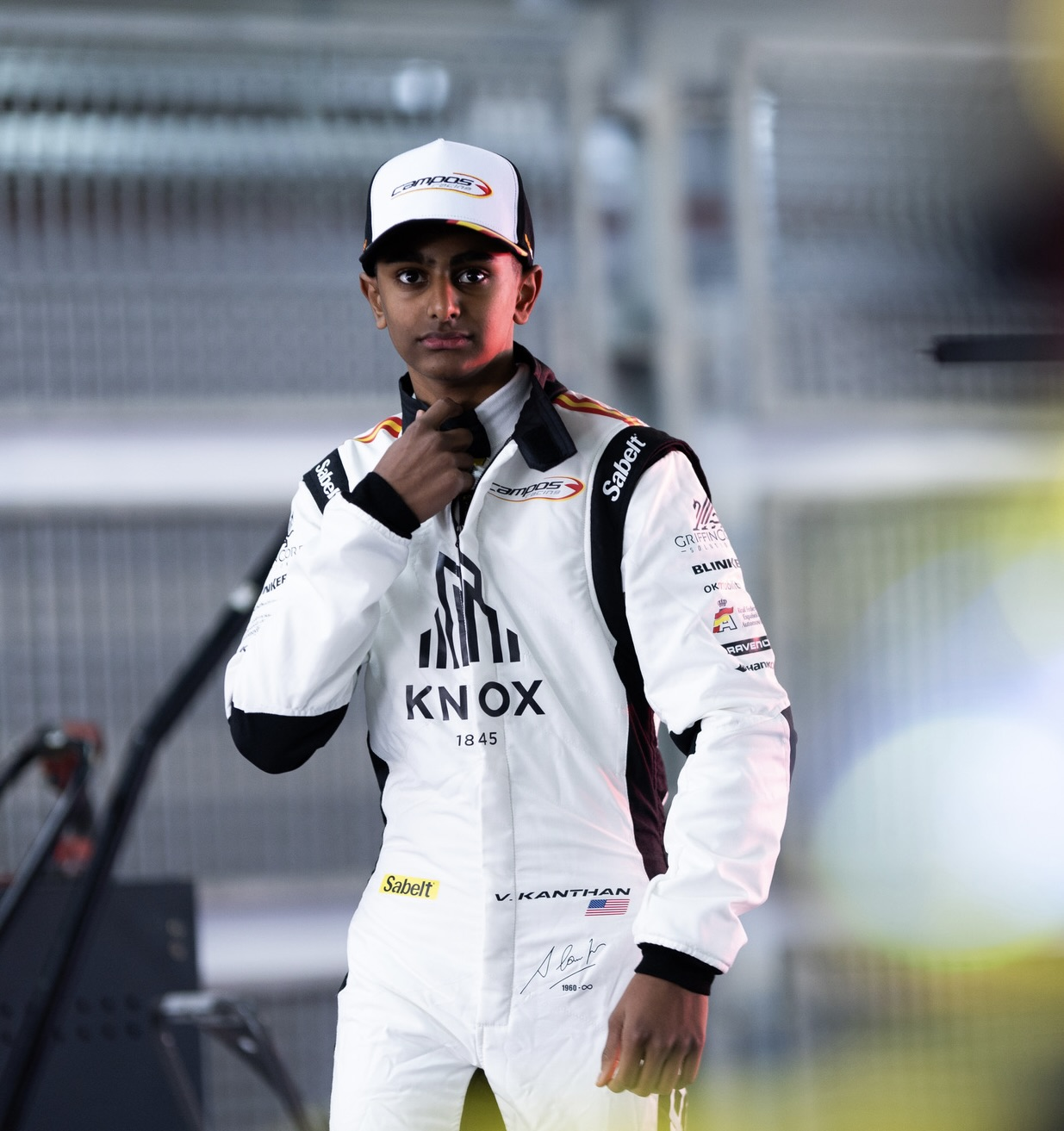
- Kanthan in 2024
- Nationality: (United States) American
- Born: 22 May 2009 (age 17) New York City, U.S.

F4 Spanish Championship career
- Debut season: 2025
- Current team: Griffin Core
- Car number: 22
- Starts: 42
- Wins: 2
- Podiums: 6
- Poles: 2
- Fastest laps: 2
- Best finish: 6th in 2026

Previous series
- 2025 2025–2026: NACAM F4; Eurocup-4 Spanish Winter

Vivek Kanthan (born 22 May 2009) is an American racing driver competing in the F4 Spanish Championship with Campos Racing.

He placed fifth overall in the Eurocup-4 Spanish Winter Championship and has achieved multiple karting titles, including winning the ROK World Superfinal and becoming vice-champion of the SKUSA SuperNationals 24.

Aside from racing, Kanthan is a classically-trained pianist and a string bassist.

== Career ==
=== Karting ===
Kanthan started karting at ten years old at his local track in New York, winning the New York State Championship in his debut year. In 2020, he began to race in US national championships, winning multiple races in the SKUSA Pro Tour and finishing third in the championship in his rookie season in the Micro category. Kanthan's 2021 season included another category jump to Mini, winning the Rotax US Max Challenge and becoming vice-champion of the SKUSA Supernationals that year.

For the 2022 season, Kanthan switched to the European karting scene, racing for the AVRacing team in the Mini category. His notable wins included the ROK Italia Trofeo along with the ROK World Superfinal in October.

Kanthan would make a category switch in 2023, racing with Parolin Motorsport in the OK-Junior category. A strong rookie season would see him take a podium in Rødby. Kanthan continued with Parolin Motorsport for 2024, racing in the OK category.

=== Formula 4 ===
==== 2025 ====
Kanthan made his single-seater debut in 2025, signing with Campos Racing to race with them in the F4 Spanish Championship.

Kanthan would compete in the Eurocup-4 Spanish Winter Championship at the beginning of the year, scoring two podiums in the first round of the series. He would score two more overall podiums in the following round at Portimão and finish the season fifth in the standings, with 73 points across nine races.

Following his winter campaign, Kanthan would start the F4 Spanish Championship with two top-five finishes. He would go on to score eleven total top-ten finishes before finishing the season with an overall podium in the final round. Kanthan finished the season ninth in the standings with 86 points and third in the rookie standings.

Kanthan made a one-off appearance in the NACAM Formula 4 Championship, competing with Alessandros Racing for Round 4 of the series in Mexico City. He won Race 1 and scored a podium in Race 3.

===== 2026 =====
Kanthan continued in the F4 Spanish Championship for 2026, signing with Griffin Core by Campos.

== Karting record ==
=== Karting career summary ===
Season	Series	Team	Position
2019	New York State Championship - Mini	Mike Doty Racing	1st
2020	SKUSA Winter Series - Micro Swift	Mike Doty Racing	17th
2020	SKUSA Pro Tour - Micro	Mike Doty Racing	3rd
2020	United States Pro Kart Series - Micro	Mike Doty Racing	5th
2021	SKUSA Pro Tour - Mini	Mike Doty Racing	6th
2021	Rotax US Max Challenge - Mini	Mike Doty Racing	1st
2021	SKUSA SuperNationals — Mini	Parolin USA	2nd
2021	49° Trofeo Delle Industrie - 60 Mini	AVRacing	34th
2022	WSK Euro Series - Mini	AVRacing	17th
2022	Trofeo South Garda Karting - Mini GR3	AVRacing	18th
2022	ROK Cup Italia - Mini	AVRacing	2nd
2022	ROK Italia Trofeo - Mini	AVRacing	1st
2022	ROK World Superfinal - Mini	AVRacing	1st
2022	Italian ACI Karting Championship - Mini GR3	AVRacing	17th
2022	SKUSA Pro Tour - Mini Swift	Parolin USA	23rd
2022	LeCont Trophy - OKJ	Parolin Motorsport	10th
2023	CIK-FIA European Championship - OKJ	Parolin Motorsport	26th
2023	Champions of the Future - OKJ	Parolin Motorsport	13th
2023	WSK Super Master Series - OK Junior	Parolin Motorsport	39th
2023	WSK Final Cup - OK	Parolin Motorsport	15th
2024	CIK-FIA European Championship - OK	Parolin Motorsport	25th
2024	Champions of the Future - OK	Parolin Motorsport	29th
2024	WSK Champions Cup - OK	Parolin Motorsport	36th

== Racing record ==
=== Racing career summary ===
Season	Series	Team	Races	Wins	Poles	F/Laps	Podiums	Points	Position
2025	Eurocup-4 Spanish Winter Championship	Campos Racing	9	0	0	0	4	73	5th
2025	F4 Spanish Championship	Campos Racing	21	0	0	0	1	86	9th
2025	NACAM Formula 4 Championship	Alessandros Blue	3	1	0	0	2	41	13th
2026	Eurocup-4 Spanish Winter Championship	Griffin Core	9	1	1	2	3	78	4th
2026	F4 Spanish Championship	Griffin Core	21	2	2	2	6	166	6th
2026	FIA F4 World Cup	Rodin Motorsport						—N/a	

* Season still in progress.

=== Complete Eurocup-4 Spanish Winter Championship results ===
(key) (Races in bold indicate pole position) (Races in italics indicate fastest lap)

Year	Team	1	2	3	4	5	6	7	8	9	DC	Points
2025	Campos Racing	JER; 1; 8	JER; 2; 2	JER; 3; 2	POR; 1; 29†	POR; 2; 2	POR; 3; 3	NAV; 1; 16	NAV; 2; 6	NAV; 3 Ret	5th	73
2026	Griffin Core	**POR**; **1**; 2	POR; 2; 9	POR; 3; 7	JAR; 1; 27	JAR; 2; 6	JAR; 3; 2	ARA; 1; 1	ARA; 2; 24	ARA; 3; 23	4th	78

=== Complete F4 Spanish Championship results ===
(key) (Races in bold indicate pole position; races in italics indicate fastest lap)

Year	Team	1	2	3	4	5	6	7	8	9	10	11	12	13	14	15	16	17	18	19	20	21	DC	Points
2025	Campos Racing	ARA; 1; 5	ARA; 2; 5	ARA; 3; 28†	NAV; 1; 14	NAV; 2; 7	NAV; 3; 8	POR; 1; 6	POR; 2 Ret	POR; 3; 10	LEC; 1; 13	LEC; 2; 6	LEC; 3; 7	JER; 1 Ret	JER; 2; 8	JER; 3; 8	CRT; 1; 6	CRT; 2; 8	CRT; 3; 17	CAT; 1; 19	CAT; 2; 2	CAT; 3; 7	9th	86
2026	Griffin Core	**CRT**; **1**; 10	CRT; 2 Ret	**CRT**; **3**; 1	POR; 1; 7	POR; 2; 11	POR; 3; 12	ARA; 1; 19	ARA; 2; 15	ARA; 3; 32	JAR; 1; 6	JAR; 2; 3	JAR; 3; 4	JER; 1; 2	JER; 2; 4	JER; 3; 9	NAV; 1; 12	NAV; 2; 3	NAV; 3; 7	CAT; 1; 1	CAT; 2; 2	CAT; 3; 6	6th	166

=== Complete NACAM Formula 4 Championship results ===
(key) (Races in bold indicate pole position; races in italics indicate fastest lap)

Year	Team	1	2	3	4	5	6	7	8	9	10	11	12	13	14	15	16	17	DC	Points
2025	Alessandros Blue	PUE1; 1	PUE1; 2	PUE1; 3	AHR1; 1	AHR1; 2	AHR1; 3	AHR2; 1	AHR2; 2	AHR2; 3	AHR3; 1; 1	AHR3; 2; 10†	AHR3; 3; 3	PUE2; 1	PUE2; 2	PUE2; 3	AHR4; 1	AHR4; 2	13th	41
