= Kasper Schormans =

Dutch racing driver (born 2009)

- Nationality: (Netherlands) Dutch
- Born: 26 April 2009 (age 17) Born, Netherlands

F4 Spanish Championship career
- Debut season: 2026
- Current team: MP Motorsport
- Car number: 40
- Starts: 21
- Wins: 4
- Podiums: 11
- Poles: 3
- Fastest laps: 2
- Best finish: 1st in 2026

Previous series
- 2026 2026 2025: Eurocup-4 Spanish Winter; UAE4 Series; Formula Trophy

Championship titles
- 2026: F4 Spanish Championship
- Statistics up to date as of 5 July 2026.

Kasper Schormans (born 26 April 2009) is a Dutch racing driver who is currently competing in the 2026 F4 Spanish Championship with MP Motorsport. Schormans is part of the Richard Mille Talent Academy and is selected as Team NL Talent member by the Dutch Motorsport Association (KNAF).

== Career ==
=== Karting ===
Schormans began karting in 2017 and had domestic success in the Rotax Micro Max Benelux from 2018 to 2020. He progressed to Rotax Max-sanctioned championships in 2021 and also made his debut in Junior Max machinery. The following year, he came runner-up to the Dutch Wintercup Championship, won the Dutch Karting Championship and finished third in the Rotax Max Challenge Grand Finals in Portimao, after the Grand Finals Schormans was invited together with the winners of the Grand Finals to the Asian Championship in Maleisië (Langkawi). Schormans became Asian Champion after winning all races. .

With JJ Racing, Schormans had a successful year in 2023, he won the European Rotax Max Winter Cup in Campillos, BNL Karting Series – Kick Off, Dutch Karting Championship and came runner-up to the Rotax Max Challenge International in Le Mans.

2024 was another shift in machinery, as Schormans began competing in the KZ2 category as youngest competitor– often thought as the highest tier in karting – as official Factory driver with Sodikart and started competing in WSK and CIK-FIA events. His debut year brought a fourth in the CIK-FIA European Championship and a fifth in the WSK Final Cup.

In 2025, Schormans's highest standings finish in KZ2 came in form of a third place in the Champions of the Future with BirelART. The Dutchman also contested the CIK-FIA European Championship but finished two spots lower than his previous campaign after driving only two of three races of the championship.

=== Formula 4 ===
Schormans made his Formula 4 debut in the 2025 Formula Trophy for Evans GP, competing in one round at Abu Dhabi and finishing a highest of fifth with the fastest lap in his first race. Schormans returned with the team in the second round of the 2026 UAE4 Series, where he came seventh in the third race.

Schormans won the Richard Mille shootout in September 2025 and was granted a seat with MP Motorsport in the 2026 F4 Spanish Championship. He kicked off his campaign in the Eurocup-4 Spanish Winter Championship, and bagged a fifth and sixth in the first two races of the opening round at Algarve. Schormans collected two fourth places in the second and third races at the next round at Jarama. Schormans came fourth again in the opening race of the final round at Aragón and won his first Formula 4 race in the second race. He ended his first full-time car racing campaign in sixth and won the rookie title.

In F4 Spain, Schormans' first exploits in the series was in the second round at Algarve International Circuit, were he got his first podium in the opening race, and got another podium, a third place – originally a win but was demoted after T-Code's appeal was successful, – in the final race. He improved his best result a round later at MotorLand Aragón, where he came second in the second race. At Jarama, he claimed his first official F4 Spain win in the first race, followed by two podiums in the rest of the races in the round. The following round, he collected two podiums at Jerez. The penultimate round at Navarra, was the standout of his campaign, starting all three races on pole position and converting them all to wins with two fastest laps.

At the end of November, Schormans competed in the F4 World Cup with MP Motorsport.

== Karting record ==
=== Karting career summary ===
| Season | Series | Team | Position |
|---|---|---|---|
| 2018 | Dutch Wintercup Championship – 4-takt Parolin Rocky | | 2nd |
| 2019 | Dutch Wintercup Championship – Micro Max | SP Motorsport | 3rd |
| 2019 | Dutch Karting Championship – Micro Max | SP Motorsport | 3rd |
| 2019 | BNL Karting Series – Micro Max | SP Motorsport | 3rd |
| 2019 | Rotax Max Challenge Netherlands – Micro Max | | 2nd |
| 2020 | BNL Karting Series – Mini Max | SP Motorsport | 10th |
| 2021 | BNL Karting Series – Junior Max | | 8th |
| 2021 | Rotax Max Challenge International Trophy – Micro Max | SP Motorsport | 12th |
| 2022 | Rotax Max Winter Cup – Junior Max | JJ Racing | 7th |
| 2022 | Rotax Max Euro Trophy – Junior Max | JJ Racing | 6th |
| 2022 | Rotax Max Challenge International Trophy – Junior Max | JJ Racing | 5th |
| 2022 | Rotax Max Challenge Grand Finals – Junior Max | JJ Racing | 3rd |
| 2022 | Rotax Max Challenge Asia Championship – Junior Max | | 1st |
| 2022 | Dutch Wintercup Championship – Junior Max | | 2nd |
| 2022 | Dutch Karting Championship – Junior Max | | 1st |
| 2022 | Rotax Max Challenge Germany – Junior Max | | 6th |
| 2023 | Rotax Max Euro Winter Cup – Junior Max | JJ Racing | 1st |
| 2023 | Rotax Max Euro Trophy – Junior Max | JJ Racing | 5th |
| 2023 | BNL Karting Series Kick Off – Junior Max | JJ Racing | 1st |
| 2023 | Dutch Karting Championship – Junior Max | | 1st |
| 2023 | Rotax Max Challenge International Trophy – Junior Max | JJ Racing | 2nd |
| 2023 | Rotax Max Challenge Grand Finals – Junior Max | JJ Racing | NC |
| 2024 | WSK Champions Cup – KZ2 | CPB Sport | 32nd |
| 2024 | WSK Super Master Series – KZ2 | CPB Sport | 21st |
| 2024 | Andrea Margutti Trophy – KZ2 | CPB Sport | 9th |
| 2024 | WSK Open Series – KZ2 | CPB Sport | 14th |
| 2024 | CIK-FIA European Championship – KZ2 | CPB Sport | 4th |
| 2024 | Champions of the Future – KZ2 | CPB Sport | 34th |
| 2024 | CIK-FIA World Cup – KZ2 | CPB Sport | NC |
| 2024 | WSK Final Cup – KZ2 | CPB Sport | 5th |
| 2025 | WSK Super Master Series – KZ2 | CPB Sport | 6th |
| 2025 | Champions of the Future – KZ2 | CPB Sport | 3rd |
| 2025 | CIK-FIA European Championship – KZ2 | CPB Sport | 6th |
| 2025 | CIK-FIA World Cup – KZ2 | BirelART Racing Srl | NC |

== Racing record ==
=== Racing career summary ===
| Season | Series | Team | Races | Wins | Poles | F/Laps | Podiums | Points | Position |
|---|---|---|---|---|---|---|---|---|---|
| 2025 | Formula Trophy | Evans GP | 2 | 0 | 0 | 1 | 0 | 10 | 16th |
| 2026 | UAE4 Series | Evans GP | 3 | 0 | 0 | 0 | 0 | 6 | 20th |
| 2026 | Eurocup-4 Spanish Winter Championship | MP Motorsport | 9 | 1 | 0 | 1 | 1 | 57 | 6th |
| 2026 | F4 Spanish Championship | MP Motorsport | 21 | 4 | 3 | 3 | 11 | 258 | **1st** |
| 2026 | FIA F4 World Cup | MP Motorsport | 0 | 0 | 0 | 0 | 0 | —N/a | TBD |

^{*} Season still in progress.

=== Complete Formula Trophy results ===
(key) (Races in bold indicate pole position; races in italics indicate fastest lap)

| Year | Team | 1 | 2 | 3 | 4 | 5 | 6 | 7 | DC | Points |
|---|---|---|---|---|---|---|---|---|---|---|
| 2025 | Evans GP | DUB; 1 | DUB; 2 | DUB; 3 | YMC1; 1 | YMC1; 2 | YMC2; 1; 23 | YMC2; 2; 5 | 16th | 10 |

=== Complete UAE4 Series results ===
(key) (Races in bold indicate pole position; races in italics indicate fastest lap)

| Year | Team | 1 | 2 | 3 | 4 | 5 | 6 | 7 | 8 | 9 | 10 | 11 | 12 | DC | Points |
|---|---|---|---|---|---|---|---|---|---|---|---|---|---|---|---|
| 2026 | Evans GP | YMC1; 1 | YMC1; 2 | YMC1; 3 | YMC2; 1; 17 | YMC2; 2; 20 | YMC2; 3; 7 | DUB; 1 | DUB; 2 | DUB; 3 | LUS; 1 | LUS; 2 | LUS; 3 | 20th | 6 |

=== Complete Eurocup-4 Spanish Winter Championship results ===
(key) (Races in bold indicate pole position) (Races in italics indicate fastest lap)

| Year | Team | 1 | 2 | 3 | 4 | 5 | 6 | 7 | 8 | 9 | DC | Points |
|---|---|---|---|---|---|---|---|---|---|---|---|---|
| 2026 | MP Motorsport | POR; 1; 5 | POR; 2; 6 | POR; 3 Ret | JAR; 1; 12 | JAR; 2; 4 | JAR; 3; 4 | ARA; 1; 4 | ARA; 2; 1 | ARA; 3; 18 | 6th | 57 |

=== Complete F4 Spanish Championship results ===
(key) (Races in bold indicate pole position; races in italics indicate fastest lap)

| Year | Entrant | 1 | 2 | 3 | 4 | 5 | 6 | 7 | 8 | 9 | 10 | 11 | 12 | 13 | 14 | 15 | 16 | 17 | 18 | 19 | 20 | 21 | Pos | Points |
|---|---|---|---|---|---|---|---|---|---|---|---|---|---|---|---|---|---|---|---|---|---|---|---|---|
| 2026 | MP Motorsport | CRT; 1; 6 | CRT; 2; 7 | CRT; 3; 5 | POR; 1; 3 | POR; 2; 4 | POR; 3; 3 | ARA; 1; 10 | ARA; 2; 2 | ARA; 3; 8 | JAR; 1; 1 | JAR; 2; 2 | JAR; 3; 2 | JER; 1; 3 | JER; 2; 5 | JER; 3; 2 | NAV; 1; 1 | NAV; 2; 1 | NAV; 3; 1 | CAT; 1; 12 | CAT; 2 Ret | CAT; 3; 9 | 1st | 258 |

* Season still in progress.
