= 2026 TCR Spain Touring Car Championship =

Motor racing competition

The 2026 TCR Spain Touring Car Championship season was the sixth season of the TCR Spain Touring Car Championship.

== Calendar ==
The calendar for the 2026 season was announced on 13 October 2025.

Part of the TCR World Tour

Rnd.		Circuit/Location	Date	Supporting
1	1	(Spain) Circuito de Madrid Jarama, San Sebastián de los Reyes, Madrid (Grand Prix Circuit)	27 February–1 March	Eurocup-3 Spanish Winter Championship; Eurocup-4 Spanish Winter Championship; Copa Clio España; Toyota GR Cup Spain
1	2	(Spain) Circuito de Madrid Jarama, San Sebastián de los Reyes, Madrid (Grand Prix Circuit)	27 February–1 March	Eurocup-3 Spanish Winter Championship; Eurocup-4 Spanish Winter Championship; Copa Clio España; Toyota GR Cup Spain
2	3	(France) Circuit Paul Ricard, Le Castellet, Var (1C-V2 Grand Prix Circuit)	23–25 April	Ultimate Cup European Series; Renault Clio Cup Europe; Legends Cars Cup European Nations Series
2	4	(France) Circuit Paul Ricard, Le Castellet, Var (1C-V2 Grand Prix Circuit)	23–25 April	Ultimate Cup European Series; Renault Clio Cup Europe; Legends Cars Cup European Nations Series
3	5	(Spain) Circuit Ricardo Tormo, Valencia, Valencian Community (External Circuit)	12–14 June	Porsche Sprint Challenge Ibérica; Copa Clio España; Spanish Drift Championship
3	6	(Spain) Circuit Ricardo Tormo, Valencia, Valencian Community (External Circuit)	12–14 June	Porsche Sprint Challenge Ibérica; Copa Clio España; Spanish Drift Championship
4	7	(Spain) Circuito de Navarra, Los Arcos, Navarra (Grand Prix Circuit)	9–11 October	F4 Spanish Championship; Clio Cup Italia; Copa Clio España; Toyota GR Cup Spain
4	8	(Spain) Circuito de Navarra, Los Arcos, Navarra (Grand Prix Circuit)	9–11 October	F4 Spanish Championship; Clio Cup Italia; Copa Clio España; Toyota GR Cup Spain
5	9	(Spain) Circuit de Barcelona-Catalunya, Montmeló, Catalonia (Grand Prix Circuit)	6–8 November	Eurocup-3; GB3 Championship; F4 Spanish Championship
5	10	(Spain) Circuit de Barcelona-Catalunya, Montmeló, Catalonia (Grand Prix Circuit)	6–8 November	Eurocup-3; GB3 Championship; F4 Spanish Championship
