= Portuguese Karting Championship =

The Portuguese Karting Championship is a kart racing series based in Portugal. It has taken place in every year since 2007.

== Champions ==
=== Junior ===
Season	Driver
2007	(Portugal) Diogo Monteiro
2010	(Portugal) Henrique Chaves Jr.
2011	(Portugal) Bruno Borlido
2012	(Portugal) Bruno Borlido
2013	(Portugal) Yohan Azedo Sousa
2018	(Portugal) Bruno Ponte
2016	(Portugal) Rodrigo Ferreira
2017	(Portugal) Guilherme Oliveira
2019	(Portugal) Luis Alves

=== X30 ===
Season	Driver
2011	(Portugal) Diogo da Silva
2011*	(Portugal) Armando Parente
2012	(Portugal) José Pedro de Faria
2012*	(Portugal) Armando Parente
2013	(Portugal) Henrique Chaves Jr.
2013*	(Portugal) Duarte Carvalho
2015	(Ukraine) Andriy Pits
2015*	(Portugal) Yohan Azedo Sousa
2016*	(Portugal) Yohan Azedo Sousa
2018*	(Portugal) Steffan Mello
2019	(Portugal) Guilherme Oliveira
2020	(Portugal) Miguel Da Silva

* represents a year in which a competition in shift karts took place

=== Juvenil ===
Season	Driver
2010	(Portugal) Ruben Rua
2011	(Portugal) Yohan Azedo Sousa
2012	(Portugal) Brais Rodriguez
2013	(Portugal) Simao Ventura
2015	(Portugal) Mariana Machado
2016	(Portugal) Luis Alves
2019	(Spain) Adrian Malheiro Sune
2020	(Portugal) Noah Monteiro
