= 2026 F4 Spanish Championship =

Motor racing season

The 2026 F4 Spanish Championship was the eleventh season of the F4 Spanish Championship. It was a multi-event motor racing championship for open wheel, formula racing cars regulated according to FIA Formula 4 regulations, based in Spain.

The pre-season Eurocup-4 Spanish Winter Championship was held across the Iberian Peninsula in the early months of 2026.

== Main series ==
=== Entry list ===
Team	No.	Driver	Class	Rounds
(Spain) TC Racing	5	(Spain) Sandro Pérez	**R**	1
(Spain) TC Racing	5	(Spain) Daniel Mota	**R**	2
(Spain) TC Racing	5	(Monaco) Sam Urus	**R**	3
(Spain) TC Racing	5	(Japan) Yuzuki Sato	**R**	4–7
(Spain) TC Racing	24	(Belgium) Beau Lowette	**R**	1–4
(Spain) TC Racing	24	(Austria) Niklas Schaufler		5–6
(Spain) TC Racing	24	(Russia) Ivan Pigaev		7
(Spain) TC Racing	78	(Portugal) Maria Germano Neto	**R** **F**	All
(Netherlands) / MP Motorsport (Note: Cars No. 7, No. 23 and No. 40 entered as MP Motorsport, cars No. 15, No. 21 and No. 39 entered as KCL Motorsport.); (Netherlands) / KCL Motorsport	7	(Netherlands) Felipe Reijs	**R**	All
(Netherlands) / MP Motorsport; (Netherlands) / KCL Motorsport	15	(Canada) Jensen Burnett	**R**	All
(Netherlands) / MP Motorsport; (Netherlands) / KCL Motorsport	21	(Poland) Borys Łyżeń	**R**	All
(Netherlands) / MP Motorsport; (Netherlands) / KCL Motorsport	23	(Netherlands) Rocco Coronel	**R**	All
(Netherlands) / MP Motorsport; (Netherlands) / KCL Motorsport	39	(Netherlands) Louis Cochet (Note: Cochet is a French driver competing under a Dutch licence.)	**R**	1–4
(Netherlands) / MP Motorsport; (Netherlands) / KCL Motorsport	39	(United Arab Emirates) Lucas Pasquinetti	**R**	5
(Netherlands) / MP Motorsport; (Netherlands) / KCL Motorsport	39	(United States) Max Mokarem	**R**	6
(Netherlands) / MP Motorsport; (Netherlands) / KCL Motorsport	39	(Canada) Leonardo Serravalle	**R**	7
(Netherlands) / MP Motorsport; (Netherlands) / KCL Motorsport	40	(Netherlands) Kasper Schormans	**R**	All
(Spain) / Campos Racing (Note: Cars No. 8, No. 10 and No. 38 entered as Campos Racing, cars No. 22, No. 37 and No. 81 entered as Griffin Core.); (Spain) / Griffin Core	8	(Malta) Jacob Micallef	**R**	All
(Spain) / Campos Racing; (Spain) / Griffin Core	10	(Spain) Luna Fluxá	**R** **F**	All
(Spain) / Campos Racing; (Spain) / Griffin Core	22	(United States) Vivek Kanthan		All
(Spain) / Campos Racing; (Spain) / Griffin Core	37	(Canada) Ty Fisher	**R**	All
(Spain) / Campos Racing; (Spain) / Griffin Core	38	(Republic of Ireland) Daniel Kelleher	**R**	All
(Spain) / Campos Racing; (Spain) / Griffin Core	81	(Portugal) Noah Monteiro		All
(Switzerland) G4 Racing	9	(Greece) Jean-Paul Karras		1–5, 7
(Switzerland) G4 Racing	9	(United Kingdom) Archie Davies		6
(Switzerland) G4 Racing	12	(Greece) Philippe Armand Karras		1–5, 7
(Switzerland) G4 Racing	12	(France) Romuald Bocquet		6
(Switzerland) G4 Racing	94	(South Africa) Jorden Moodley		1–5
(Switzerland) G4 Racing	94	(United Arab Emirates) Stefano Pedani (Note: Pedani is an Australian-Italian driver competing under an Emirati licence.)	**R**	6
(Switzerland) G4 Racing	94	(China) Zijun Zhao		7
(Spain) Monlau Motorsport	11	(United States) Rahim Alibhai	**R**	1–2, 4–6
(Spain) Monlau Motorsport	11	(Spain) Egor Ivanchenko	**R**	7
(Spain) Monlau Motorsport	11	(Japan) Yuzuki Sato	**R**	3
(Spain) Monlau Motorsport	27	(Japan) Yuzuki Sato	**R**	2
(Spain) Monlau Motorsport	27	(Italy) Alexander Chartier (Note: Chartier is a Canadian driver competing under an Italian licence.)	**R**	1
(Spain) Monlau Motorsport	27	(Netherlands) Juste Mulder	**R**	3–7
(Spain) Monlau Motorsport	73	(Argentina) Fausto Arnaudo	**R**	1–4, 6–7
(Spain) Monlau Motorsport	73	(Argentina) Thiago Palotini	**R**	5
(Spain) Monlau Motorsport	88	(Spain) Miki Blascos	**R**	All
(Spain) / Tecnicar by Amtog (Note: Cars No. 13, No. 18 and No. 25 entered as Tecnicar by Amtog, cars No. 17 and No. 77 entered as T-Code.); (Spain) / T-Code	13	(Mexico) Rodrigo Martínez	**R**	All
(Spain) / Tecnicar by Amtog; (Spain) / T-Code	17	(Spain) Nacho Tuñón		All
(Spain) / Tecnicar by Amtog; (Spain) / T-Code	18	(Romania) Zoe Florescu	**R** **F**	1–3, 5–7
(Spain) / Tecnicar by Amtog; (Spain) / T-Code	18	(United States) Max Mokarem	**R**	4
(Spain) / Tecnicar by Amtog; (Spain) / T-Code	25	(Spain) Aleix Piñera	**R**	All
(Spain) / Tecnicar by Amtog; (Spain) / T-Code	77	(Serbia) Andrej Petrović		All
(Spain) / Drivex (Note: Cars No. 32, No. 44 and No. 46 entered as Drivex, cars No. 28, No. 71 and No. 80 entered as DXR.); (Spain) / DXR	28	(Portugal) Max Radeck	**R**	All
(Spain) / Drivex; (Spain) / DXR	32	(Argentina) Simón Bulbarella	**R**	All
(Spain) / Drivex; (Spain) / DXR	44	(Sweden) Elliot Kaczynski	**R**	All
(Spain) / Drivex; (Spain) / DXR	46	(United Kingdom) Nathan Tye		All
(Spain) / Drivex; (Spain) / DXR	71	(Monaco) Sam Urus	**R**	1–2
(Spain) / Drivex; (Spain) / DXR	71	(United States) Dean Pedersen	**R**	3–4
(Spain) / Drivex; (Spain) / DXR	71	(Argentina) Jorge Bruno	**R**	5–6
(Spain) / Drivex; (Spain) / DXR	71	(Brazil) Eli Steinbruch	**R**	7
(Spain) / Drivex; (Spain) / DXR	80	(Mexico) Sebastián Frigolet	**R**	All
(Spain) GRS Team	74	(Spain) Pablo Riccobono Bello		1–2, 4–7
(Spain) GRS Team	74	(Belgium) Yani Stevenheydens		3
(Spain) GRS Team	83	(Finland) Alfons Miettinen	**R**	All
(Spain) GRS Team	96	(United States) Andre Rodriguez		2
(Spain) GRS Team	96	(Japan) Ryusho Nakazato		3, 5–6
(Spain) GRS Team	96	(Spain) Sandro Pérez	**R**	4
(Spain) GRS Team	96	(United States) Maddie Colleran	**F**	7

Icon	Legend
**R**	Rookie
**F**	Female Trophy
**G**	Guest drivers ineligible to score points

- Jensen Burnett was initially announced to drive for Drivex before switching to MP Motorsport.
- Jorge Bruno was initially announced to drive for Drivex, but he later switched to the Formula 4 CEZ Championship.
- Dante Cima was initially announced to drive for GRS Team, before being replaced by Alfons Miettinen.

=== Race calendar and results ===
The calendar was announced on 5 December 2025. On 20 May 2026, the calendar was updated by confirming the venue of fourth round at Circuito del Jarama.

Round		Circuit	Date	Pole position	Fastest lap	Winning driver	Winning team	Rookie winner	Supporting
1	R1	(Spain) Circuit Ricardo Tormo, Cheste	11 April	(United States) Vivek Kanthan	(United States) Vivek Kanthan	(Netherlands) Rocco Coronel	(Netherlands) MP Motorsport	(Netherlands) Rocco Coronel	Toyota GR Cup Spain
1	R2	(Spain) Circuit Ricardo Tormo, Cheste	11 April	(Spain) Aleix Piñera	(Portugal) Noah Monteiro	(Netherlands) Rocco Coronel	(Netherlands) MP Motorsport	(Netherlands) Rocco Coronel	Toyota GR Cup Spain
1	R3	(Spain) Circuit Ricardo Tormo, Cheste	12 April	(United States) Vivek Kanthan	(Poland) Borys Łyżeń	(United States) Vivek Kanthan	(Spain) Griffin Core	(Poland) Borys Łyżeń	Toyota GR Cup Spain
2	R1	(Portugal) Algarve International Circuit, Portimão	6 June	(Malta) Jacob Micallef	(Serbia) Andrej Petrović	(Poland) Borys Łyżeń	(Netherlands) KCL Motorsport	(Poland) Borys Łyżeń	Eurocup-3
2	R2	(Portugal) Algarve International Circuit, Portimão	6 June	(Portugal) Noah Monteiro	(Poland) Borys Łyżeń	(Poland) Borys Łyżeń	(Netherlands) KCL Motorsport	(Poland) Borys Łyżeń	Eurocup-3
2	R3	(Portugal) Algarve International Circuit, Portimão	7 June	(Serbia) Andrej Petrović	(Spain) Nacho Tuñón	(Spain) Nacho Tuñón	(Spain) T-Code by Amtog	(Netherlands) Kasper Schormans	Eurocup-3
3	R1	(Spain) MotorLand Aragón, Alcañiz	20 June	(United Kingdom) Nathan Tye	(Spain) Nacho Tuñón	(Spain) Nacho Tuñón	(Spain) T-Code by Amtog	(Canada) Ty Fisher	Toyota GR Cup Spain
3	R2	(Spain) MotorLand Aragón, Alcañiz	20 June	(United Kingdom) Nathan Tye	(United States) Vivek Kanthan	(United Kingdom) Nathan Tye	(Spain) Drivex	(Netherlands) Kasper Schormans	Toyota GR Cup Spain
3	R3	(Spain) MotorLand Aragón, Alcañiz	21 June	(Serbia) Andrej Petrović	(Portugal) Noah Monteiro	(Serbia) Andrej Petrović	(Spain) T-Code by Amtog	(Poland) Borys Łyżeń	Toyota GR Cup Spain
4	R1	(Spain) Circuito del Jarama, San Sebastián de los Reyes	22 August	(Poland) Borys Łyżeń	(Poland) Borys Łyżeń	(Netherlands) Kasper Schormans	(Netherlands) MP Motorsport	(Netherlands) Kasper Schormans	Stand-alone round
4	R2	(Spain) Circuito del Jarama, San Sebastián de los Reyes	23 August	(Poland) Borys Łyżeń	(Poland) Borys Łyżeń	(Poland) Borys Łyżeń	(Netherlands) KCL Motorsport	(Poland) Borys Łyżeń	Stand-alone round
4	R3	(Spain) Circuito del Jarama, San Sebastián de los Reyes	23 August	(Sweden) Elliot Kaczynski	(Poland) Borys Łyżeń	(Sweden) Elliot Kaczynski	(Spain) Drivex	(Sweden) Elliot Kaczynski	Stand-alone round
5	R1	(Spain) Circuito de Jerez, Jerez de la Frontera	26 September	(Portugal) Noah Monteiro	(Netherlands) Kasper Schormans	(Portugal) Noah Monteiro	(Spain) Griffin Core	(Netherlands) Kasper Schormans	Toyota GR Cup Spain
5	R2	(Spain) Circuito de Jerez, Jerez de la Frontera	26 September	(Portugal) Noah Monteiro	(Portugal) Noah Monteiro	(Portugal) Noah Monteiro	(Spain) Griffin Core	(Poland) Borys Łyżeń	Toyota GR Cup Spain
5	R3	(Spain) Circuito de Jerez, Jerez de la Frontera	27 September	(Netherlands) Rocco Coronel	(Poland) Borys Łyżeń	(Netherlands) Rocco Coronel	(Netherlands) MP Motorsport	(Netherlands) Rocco Coronel	Toyota GR Cup Spain
6	R1	(Spain) Circuito de Navarra, Los Arcos	10 October	(Netherlands) Kasper Schormans	(Netherlands) Kasper Schormans	(Netherlands) Kasper Schormans	(Netherlands) MP Motorsport	(Netherlands) Kasper Schormans	TCR Spain Touring Car Championship; Clio Cup Italia; Copa Clio España; Toyota GR Cup Spain
6	R2	(Spain) Circuito de Navarra, Los Arcos	10 October	(Netherlands) Kasper Schormans	(Netherlands) Kasper Schormans	(Netherlands) Kasper Schormans	(Netherlands) MP Motorsport	(Netherlands) Kasper Schormans	TCR Spain Touring Car Championship; Clio Cup Italia; Copa Clio España; Toyota GR Cup Spain
6	R3	(Spain) Circuito de Navarra, Los Arcos	11 October	(Netherlands) Kasper Schormans	(Sweden) Elliot Kaczynski	(Netherlands) Kasper Schormans	(Netherlands) MP Motorsport	(Netherlands) Kasper Schormans	TCR Spain Touring Car Championship; Clio Cup Italia; Copa Clio España; Toyota GR Cup Spain
7	R1	(Spain) Circuit de Barcelona-Catalunya, Montmeló	7 November	(Sweden) Elliot Kaczynski	(Sweden) Elliot Kaczynski	(United States) Vivek Kanthan	(Spain) Griffin Core	(Netherlands) Rocco Coronel	Eurocup-3; GB3 Championship; TCR Spain Touring Car Championship
7	R2	(Spain) Circuit de Barcelona-Catalunya, Montmeló	7 November	(Sweden) Elliot Kaczynski	(Greece) Philippe Armand Karras	(Sweden) Elliot Kaczynski	(Spain) Drivex	(Sweden) Elliot Kaczynski	Eurocup-3; GB3 Championship; TCR Spain Touring Car Championship
7	R3	(Spain) Circuit de Barcelona-Catalunya, Montmeló	8 November	(United Kingdom) Nathan Tye	(United Kingdom) Nathan Tye	(United Kingdom) Nathan Tye	(Spain) Drivex	(Sweden) Elliot Kaczynski	Eurocup-3; GB3 Championship; TCR Spain Touring Car Championship

=== Championship standings ===
Points are awarded to the top ten classified finishers in 30-minute races and for the top nine classified finishers in 25-minute races.

Races	Position, points per race											
Races	**1st**	**2nd**	**3rd**	**4th**	**5th**	**6th**	**7th**	**8th**	**9th**	**10th**	**Pole**	**FL**
30-minute races	25	18	15	12	10	8	6	4	2	1	2	1
25-minute races	18	15	12	10	8	6	4	2	1			1

==== Drivers' championship ====
Pos	Driver	CRT (Spain)			POR (Portugal)			ARA (Spain)			JAR (Spain)			JER (Spain)			NAV (Spain)			CAT (Spain)			Pts
Pos	Driver	R1	R2	R3	R1	R2	R3	R1	R2	R3	R1	R2	R3	R1	R2	R3	R1	R2	R3	R1	R2	R3	Pts
1	(Netherlands) Kasper Schormans	6	7	5	3	4	3	10	2	8	1	2	2	3	5	2	**1**	**1**	**1**	12	Ret	9	258
2	(Portugal) Noah Monteiro	3	3	3	8	**3**	20	4	4	2	28	5	7	**1**	**1**	3	6	8	2	7	27	10	210
3	(Netherlands) Rocco Coronel	1	1	4	25	5	5	6	6	30	8	4	5	8	8	**1**	2	2	8	3	6	12	202
4	(Poland) Borys Łyżeń	9	6	2	1	1	22	25	10	5	**2**	**1**	17	4	2	4	Ret	5	29	8	4	8	188
5	(Serbia) Andrej Petrović	7	Ret	19	30†	2	**2**	3	5	**1**	4	6	6	6	6	7	9	25	4	6	3	4	184
6	(United States) Vivek Kanthan	**10**	Ret	**1**	7	11	12	19	15	32	6	3	4	2	4	9	12	3	7	1	2	6	166
7	(United Kingdom) Nathan Tye	8	9	7	2	7	Ret	**2**	**1**	3	15	16	11	14	Ret	12	3	Ret	21	2	11	**1**	147
8	(Sweden) Elliot Kaczynski	5	Ret	Ret	28	12	13	28	27	7	5	Ret	**1**	11	3	6	4	6	27	**17**	**1**	2	131
9	(Spain) Nacho Tuñón	30	8	15	5	6	1	1	3	4	10	8	Ret	10	22	11	14	34	31	23	30†	3	113
10	(Republic of Ireland) Daniel Kelleher	12	10	6	15	9	11	21	14	9	12	17	9	5	7	5	5	4	3	5	8	7	90
11	(Canada) Ty Fisher	4	4	18	4	10	26	5	11	16	13	14	14	7	11	8	10	Ret	10	4	7	5	82
12	(Spain) Aleix Piñera	2	**2**	11	6	16	7	11	13	6	11	11	3	13	12	17	15	14	11	11	12	16	70
13	(Malta) Jacob Micallef	22	13	13	**27**	8	6	Ret	7	10	3	7	13	9	23	20	30	22	30	14	13	13	38
14	(Canada) Jensen Burnett	32	5	8	11	15	8	9	19	11	14	10	12	25	13	Ret	7	10	5	Ret	Ret	11	34
15	(Spain) Miki Blascos	11	11	Ret	Ret	13	4	Ret	Ret	13	7	13	10	17	10	Ret	31	18	14	20	5	21	27
16	(Austria) Niklas Schaufler													12	14	10	11	7	6				13
17	(Portugal) Max Radeck	18	27	Ret	14	18	9	Ret	24	29	25	26	8	22	19	28	8	16	15	19	22	15	10
18	(Netherlands) Juste Mulder							7	9	19	19	22	Ret	15	28	Ret	27	17	18	10	9	22	9
19	(Greece) Philippe Armand Karras	23	22	20	9	14	10	12	18	22	21	15	15	16	9	15				9	18	Ret	7
20	(Spain) Luna Fluxá	17	12	Ret	31	28	24	8	Ret	17	29	27	Ret	21	20	14	23	12	9	15	16	14	6
21	(Argentina) Fausto Arnaudo	20	14	12	12	22	14	23	12	20	9	9	29†				18	9	12	21	10	23	4
22	(Netherlands) Louis Cochet	21	17	23	32†	19	15	30	8	18	Ret	19	Ret										2
23	(United States) Rahim Alibhai	WD	WD	9	17	17	19				17	21	20	Ret	16	22	29	15	16				2
24	(Netherlands) Felipe Reijs	15	16	10	24	24	17	14	16	23	16	12	21	19	15	13	32	11	20	26	17	19	1
25	(Greece) Jean-Paul Karras	19	18	16	10	20	31†	15	20	21	22	18	18	18	18	16				32	Ret	26	1
26	(Argentina) Simón Bulbarella	13	19	26	20	23	Ret	16	23	12	24	28	19	24	17	21	26	19	13	22	19	17	0
27	(Romania) Zoe Florescu	Ret	15	14	23	21	27†	13	29	24				28	Ret	19	13	32	25	18	15	27	0
28	(Belgium) Beau Lowette	14	Ret	17	13	Ret	29†	Ret	21	27	18	24	Ret										0
29	(Japan) Yuzuki Sato				18	Ret	16	24	22	34†	20	23	16	20	Ret	18	16	13	Ret	34†	25	24	0
30	(Canada) Leonardo Serravalle																			13	20	25	0
31	(Mexico) Sebastián Frigolet	16	25	Ret	21	27	30†	17	Ret	33	27	29	24	23	27	29	35	23	28	24	14	18	0
32	(Belgium) Yani Stevenheydens							18	17	14													0
33	(Portugal) Maria Germano Neto	29	21	29	26	31	25	26	Ret	15	30	Ret	28†	34	Ret	27	24	33	17	31	28	Ret	0
34	(Russia) Ivan Pigaev																			16	24	20	0
35	(Spain) Pablo Riccobono Bello	28	Ret	30†	16	Ret	DNS				26	25	22	26	25	Ret	21	24	Ret	28	21	Ret	0
36	(United States) Max Mokarem										Ret	Ret	DNS				17	21	Ret				0
37	(Spain) Daniel Mota				19	26	18																0
38	(Finland) Alfons Miettinen	26	Ret	21	DNS	29	Ret	22	25	26	Ret	30	26	31	26	25	22	27	19	29	Ret	28	0
39	(France) Romuald Bocquet																19	30	26				0
40	(United Arab Emirates) Stefano Pedani																20	20	22				0
41	(Monaco) Sam Urus	24	20	25	29	Ret	28†	20	26	28													0
42	(United States) Dean Pedersen							31†	30†	Ret	23	20	23										0
43	(South Africa) Jorden Moodley	27	26	22	Ret	DNS	21	WD	WD	WD	Ret	32†	27	35	29	DNS							0
44	(Argentina) Jorge Bruno													29	21	24	28	26	24				0
45	(Mexico) Rodrigo Martínez	Ret	28	24	22	30	23	27	28	31	Ret	31	25	33	30	Ret	33	31	Ret	30	29	29	0
46	(Japan) Ryusho Nakazato							29	Ret	25				32	Ret	Ret	25	28	23				0
47	(China) Zijun Zhao																			25	23	Ret	0
48	(United Arab Emirates) Lucas Pasquinetti													27	Ret	23							0
49	(Spain) Sandro Pérez	31	23	28							Ret	WD	WD										0
50	(Italy) Alexander Chartier	25	24	27																			0
51	(Argentina) Thiago Palotini													30	24	26							0
52	(United States) Andre Rodriguez				33†	25	Ret																0
53	(Brazil) Eli Steinbruch																			27	26	30	0
54	(United Kingdom) Archie Davies																34	29	32†				0
55	(Spain) Egor Ivanchenko																			33	DNS	DNS	0
–	(United States) Maddie Colleran																			Ret	DNS	DNS	–
Pos	Driver	R1	R2	R3	R1	R2	R3	R1	R2	R3	R1	R2	R3	R1	R2	R3	R1	R2	R3	R1	R2	R3	Pts
Pos	Driver	CRT (Spain)			POR (Portugal)			ARA (Spain)			JAR (Spain)			JER (Spain)			NAV (Spain)			CAT (Spain)			Pts

Colour	Result
Gold	Winner
Silver	Second place
Bronze	Third place
Green	Points classification
Blue	Non-points classification
Blue	Non-classified finish (NC)
Purple	Retired, not classified (Ret)
Red	Did not qualify (DNQ)
Red	Did not pre-qualify (DNPQ)
Black	Disqualified (DSQ)
White	Did not start (DNS)
White	Withdrew (WD)
White	Race cancelled (C)
Blank	Did not practice (DNP)
Blank	Did not arrive (DNA)
Blank	Excluded (EX)

**Bold** – Pole
Italics – Fastest Lap
† — Did not finish but classified
Rookie

==== Teams' standings ====
For round one, each team's best two drivers in the drivers' championship at the end of the event scored points. For the following competitions, two highest classified drivers at the beginning of them score points. Bonus points for fastest laps are awarded if applicable.

Pos	Driver	No.	CRT (Spain)			POR (Portugal)			ARA (Spain)			JAR (Spain)			JER (Spain)			NAV (Spain)			CAT (Spain)			Pts
Pos	Driver	No.	R1	R2	R3	R1	R2	R3	R1	R2	R3	R1	R2	R3	R1	R2	R3	R1	R2	R3	R1	R2	R3	Pts
1	(Netherlands) MP Motorsport	23	1	1	4	25	5	5	6	6	30	8	4	5	8	8	1	2	2	8	3	6	12	454
1	(Netherlands) MP Motorsport	40	6	7	5	3	4	3	10	2	8	1	2	2	3	5	2	1	1	1	12	Ret	9	454
2	(Spain) Griffin Core	22	10	Ret	1	7	11	12	19	15	32				2	4	9	12	3	7	1	2	6	338
2	(Spain) Griffin Core	37										13	14	14										338
2	(Spain) Griffin Core	81	3	3	3	8	3	20	4	4	2	28	5	7	1	1	3	6	8	2	7	27	10	338
3	(Spain) T-Code by Amtog	17	30	8	15	5	6	1	1	3	4	10	8	Ret	10	22	11	14	34	31	23	30†	3	293
3	(Spain) T-Code by Amtog	77	7	Ret	19	30†	2	2	3	5	1	4	6	6	6	6	7	9	25	4	6	3	4	293
4	(Spain) Drivex	44	5	Ret	Ret	28	12	13	28	27	7	5	Ret	1	11	3	6	4	6	27	17	1	2	270
4	(Spain) Drivex	46	8	9	7	2	7	Ret	2	1	3	15	16	11	14	Ret	12	3	Ret	21	2	11	1	270
5	(Netherlands) KCL Motorsport	15	32	5	8	11	15	8	9	19	11	14	10	12	25	13	Ret	7	10	5	Ret	Ret	11	220
5	(Netherlands) KCL Motorsport	21	9	6	2	1	1	22	25	10	5	2	1	17	4	2	4	Ret	5	29	8	4	8	220
6	(Spain) Campos Racing	8							Ret	7	10	3	7	13	9	23	20	30	22	30	14	13	13	116
6	(Spain) Campos Racing	10	17	12	Ret	31	28	24																116
6	(Spain) Campos Racing	38	12	10	6	15	9	11	21	14	9	12	17	9	5	7	5	5	4	3	5	8	7	116
7	(Spain) Tecnicar	13										Ret	31	25										70
7	(Spain) Tecnicar	18	Ret	15	14	23	21	27†	13	29	24				28	Ret	19	13	32	25	18	15	27	70
7	(Spain) Tecnicar	25	2	2	11	6	16	7	11	13	6	11	11	3	13	12	17	15	14	11	11	12	16	70
8	(Spain) Monlau Motorsport	11	WD	WD	9	17	17	19																31
8	(Spain) Monlau Motorsport	27										19	22	Ret	15	28	Ret	27	17	18	10	9	22	31
8	(Spain) Monlau Motorsport	73							23	12	20													31
8	(Spain) Monlau Motorsport	88	11	11	Ret	Ret	13	4	Ret	Ret	13	7	13	10	17	10	Ret	31	18	14	20	5	21	31
9	(Spain) TC Racing	5							20	26	28				20	Ret	18				34†	25	24	12
9	(Spain) TC Racing	24	14	Ret	17	13	Ret	29†	Ret	21	27	18	24	Ret				11	7	6				12
9	(Spain) TC Racing	78	29	21	29	26	31	25				30	Ret	28†	34	Ret	27	24	33	17	31	28	Ret	12
10	(Spain) DXR	28	18	27	Ret	14	18	9	Ret	24	29	25	26	8	22	19	28	8	16	15	19	22	15	10
10	(Spain) DXR	80	16	25	Ret	21	27	30†	17	Ret	33	27	29	24	23	27	29	35	23	28	24	14	18	10
11	(Switzerland) G4 Racing	9	19	18	16	10	20	31†	15	20	21	22	18	18	18	18	16				32	Ret	26	8
11	(Switzerland) G4 Racing	12	23	22	20	9	14	10	12	18	22	21	15	15	16	9	15	19	30	26	9	18	Ret	8
11	(Switzerland) G4 Racing	94																20	20	22				8
12	(Spain) GRS Team	74	28	Ret	30†	16	Ret	DNS	18	17	14	26	25	22	26	25	Ret	21	24	Ret	28	21	Ret	0
12	(Spain) GRS Team	83	26	Ret	21	DNS	29	Ret	22	25	26	Ret	30	26	31	26	25	22	27	19	29	Ret	28	0
Pos	Team	No.	R1	R2	R3	R1	R2	R3	R1	R2	R3	R1	R2	R3	R1	R2	R3	R1	R2	R3	R1	R2	R3	Pts
Pos	Team	No.	CRT (Spain)			POR (Portugal)			ARA (Spain)			JAR (Spain)			JER (Spain)			NAV (Spain)			CAT (Spain)			Pts

== Winter series ==
=== Entry list ===
Team	No.	Driver	Class	Rounds
(Netherlands) / MP Motorsport (Note: Cars No. 7, No. 23 and No. 40 entered as MP Motorsport, cars No. 1, No. 21 and No. 39 entered as KCL Motorsport.); (Netherlands) / KCL Motorsport	1	(Netherlands) Reno Francot		All
(Netherlands) / MP Motorsport; (Netherlands) / KCL Motorsport	7	(Netherlands) Felipe Reijs	**R**	All
(Netherlands) / MP Motorsport; (Netherlands) / KCL Motorsport	21	(Poland) Borys Łyżeń	**R**	All
(Netherlands) / MP Motorsport; (Netherlands) / KCL Motorsport	23	(Netherlands) Rocco Coronel	**R**	All
(Netherlands) / MP Motorsport; (Netherlands) / KCL Motorsport	39	(France) Louis Cochet	**R**	All
(Netherlands) / MP Motorsport; (Netherlands) / KCL Motorsport	40	(Netherlands) Kasper Schormans	**R**	All
(Spain) / Campos Racing (Note: Cars No. 8, No. 10 and No. 38 entered as Campos Racing, cars No. 22, No. 37 and No. 81 entered as Griffin Core.); (Spain) / Griffin Core	8	(Malta) Jacob Micallef	**R**	All
(Spain) / Campos Racing; (Spain) / Griffin Core	10	(Spain) Luna Fluxá	**R** **F**	All
(Spain) / Campos Racing; (Spain) / Griffin Core	22	(United States) Vivek Kanthan		All
(Spain) / Campos Racing; (Spain) / Griffin Core	37	(Canada) Ty Fisher	**R**	All
(Spain) / Campos Racing; (Spain) / Griffin Core	38	(Republic of Ireland) Daniel Kelleher	**R**	All
(Spain) / Campos Racing; (Spain) / Griffin Core	81	(Portugal) Noah Monteiro		All
(Switzerland) G4 Racing	9	(Greece) Jean-Paul Karras		All
(Switzerland) G4 Racing	12	(Greece) Philippe Armand Karras		All
(Switzerland) G4 Racing	94	(South Africa) Jorden Moodley		1–2
(Switzerland) G4 Racing	94	(United Arab Emirates) Stefano Pedani (Note: Pedani is an Australian-Italian driver competing under an Emirati licence.)		3
(Spain) Monlau Motorsport	11	(United States) Rahim Alibhai	**R**	All
(Spain) Monlau Motorsport	73	(Argentina) Fausto Arnaudo	**R**	All
(Spain) Monlau Motorsport	88	(Spain) Miki Blascos	**R**	All
(Spain) / Tecnicar by Amtog (Note: Cars No. 13 and No. 18 entered as Tecnicar by Amtog, cars No. 17 and No. 77 entered as T-Code.); (Spain) / T-Code	13	(Spain) Aleix Piñera	**R**	All
(Spain) / Tecnicar by Amtog; (Spain) / T-Code	17	(Spain) Nacho Tuñón		All
(Spain) / Tecnicar by Amtog; (Spain) / T-Code	18	(Romania) Zoe Florescu	**R** **F**	All
(Spain) / Tecnicar by Amtog; (Spain) / T-Code	77	(Serbia) Andrej Petrović		All
(Spain) / Drivex (Note: Cars No. 15, No. 32 and No. 46 entered as Drivex, cars No. 28, No. 44 and No. 80 entered as DXR.); (Spain) / DXR	15	(Canada) Jensen Burnett	**R**	All
(Spain) / Drivex; (Spain) / DXR	28	(Portugal) Max Radeck	**R**	All
(Spain) / Drivex; (Spain) / DXR	32	(Argentina) Simón Bulbarella	**R**	All
(Spain) / Drivex; (Spain) / DXR	44	(Sweden) Elliot Kaczynski	**R**	All
(Spain) / Drivex; (Spain) / DXR	46	(United Kingdom) Nathan Tye		All
(Spain) / Drivex; (Spain) / DXR	80	(Mexico) Sebastián Frigolet	**R**	All
(Spain) TC Racing	24	(Belgium) Beau Lowette	**R**	All
(Spain) TC Racing	78	(Portugal) Maria Germano Neto	**R** **F**	All
(Spain) GRS Team	70	(Netherlands) Dante Cima	**R**	1–2
(Spain) GRS Team	74	(Spain) Pablo Riccobono Bello		All

Icon	Legend
**R**	Rookie
**F**	Female Trophy
**G**	Guest drivers ineligible to score points

=== Race calendar and results ===
The calendar was announced on 21 November 2025.

Round		Circuit	Date	Pole position	Fastest lap	Winning driver	Winning team	Rookie winner	Supporting
1	R1	(Portugal) Algarve International Circuit, Portimão	21 February	(United States) Vivek Kanthan	(United States) Vivek Kanthan	(United Kingdom) Nathan Tye	(Spain) Drivex	(Netherlands) Kasper Schormans	Eurocup-3 Spanish Winter Championship
1	SR	(Portugal) Algarve International Circuit, Portimão	21 February		(Netherlands) Reno Francot	(Serbia) Andrej Petrović	(Spain) T-Code	(Spain) Luna Fluxá	Eurocup-3 Spanish Winter Championship
1	R2	(Portugal) Algarve International Circuit, Portimão	22 February	(United Kingdom) Nathan Tye	(United States) Vivek Kanthan	(United Kingdom) Nathan Tye	(Spain) Drivex	(Netherlands) Rocco Coronel	Eurocup-3 Spanish Winter Championship
2	R1	(Spain) Circuito del Jarama, San Sebastián de los Reyes	28 February	(Portugal) Noah Monteiro	(Portugal) Noah Monteiro	(Portugal) Noah Monteiro	(Spain) Griffin Core	(Canada) Ty Fisher	Eurocup-3 Spanish Winter Championship; TCR Spain Touring Car Championship; Copa Clio España; Toyota GR Cup Spain
2	SR	(Spain) Circuito del Jarama, San Sebastián de los Reyes	28 February		(Poland) Borys Łyżeń	(Poland) Borys Łyżeń	(Netherlands) KCL Motorsport	(Poland) Borys Łyżeń	Eurocup-3 Spanish Winter Championship; TCR Spain Touring Car Championship; Copa Clio España; Toyota GR Cup Spain
2	R2	(Spain) Circuito del Jarama, San Sebastián de los Reyes	1 March	(Portugal) Noah Monteiro	(Portugal) Noah Monteiro	(Portugal) Noah Monteiro	(Spain) Griffin Core	(Netherlands) Kasper Schormans	Eurocup-3 Spanish Winter Championship; TCR Spain Touring Car Championship; Copa Clio España; Toyota GR Cup Spain
3	R1	(Spain) MotorLand Aragón, Alcañiz	14 March	(United Kingdom) Nathan Tye	(Netherlands) Kasper Schormans	(United States) Vivek Kanthan	(Spain) Griffin Core	(Netherlands) Rocco Coronel	Eurocup-3 Spanish Winter Championship; Copa Clio España
3	SR	(Spain) MotorLand Aragón, Alcañiz	14 March		(Netherlands) Reno Francot	(Netherlands) Kasper Schormans	(Netherlands) MP Motorsport	(Netherlands) Kasper Schormans	Eurocup-3 Spanish Winter Championship; Copa Clio España
3	R2	(Spain) MotorLand Aragón, Alcañiz	15 March	(Serbia) Andrej Petrović	(Netherlands) Rocco Coronel	(Serbia) Andrej Petrović	(Spain) T-Code	(Netherlands) Rocco Coronel	Eurocup-3 Spanish Winter Championship; Copa Clio España

=== Championship standings ===
Points are awarded to the top ten classified finishers in both the 30-minute races and the 20-minute sprint races.

Races	Position, points per race											
Races	**1st**	**2nd**	**3rd**	**4th**	**5th**	**6th**	**7th**	**8th**	**9th**	**10th**	**Pole**	**FL**
Race 1 & 2	25	18	15	12	10	8	6	4	2	1	2	1
Sprint race	10	9	8	7	6	5	4	3	2	1		1

==== Drivers' championship ====
Pos	Driver	POR (Portugal)			JAR (Spain)			ARA (Spain)			Pts
Pos	Driver	R1	SR	R2	R1	SR	R2	R1	SR	R2	Pts
1	(Portugal) Noah Monteiro	4	10	2	**1**	8	**1**	2	27	6	116
2	(United Kingdom) Nathan Tye	1	7	**1**	15	5	9	**19**	26	3	81
3	(Serbia) Andrej Petrović	6	1	5	17	2	3	13	18	**1**	79
4	(United States) Vivek Kanthan	**2**	9	7	27	6	2	1	24	23	78
5	(Netherlands) Reno Francot	9	4	4	6	3	6	9	2	26†	58
6	(Netherlands) Kasper Schormans	5	6	Ret	12	4	4	4	1	18	57
7	(Netherlands) Rocco Coronel	Ret	3	3	28†	30	21	3	25	2	57
8	(Poland) Borys Łyżeń	11	13	20	8	1	8	5	3	4	49
9	(Spain) Nacho Tuñón	3	8	6	4	9	19	18	12	Ret	40
10	(Republic of Ireland) Daniel Kelleher	7	5	Ret	5	7	17	Ret	5	7	38
11	(Spain) Luna Fluxá	14	2	8	11	15	23†	6	9	8	27
12	(Canada) Ty Fisher	15	12	Ret	2	10	22†	24	Ret	25†	19
13	(Belgium) Beau Lowette	27	Ret	16	3	11	Ret	11	Ret	17	15
14	(Canada) Jensen Burnett	8	11	23	9	24	Ret	8	6	20	15
15	(Malta) Jacob Micallef	12	26	Ret	13	13	5	Ret	10	21	11
16	(Argentina) Simón Bulbarella	26	15	10	10	12	Ret	Ret	4	10	10
17	(Spain) Miki Blascos	13	16	11	Ret	18	24†	Ret	Ret	5	10
18	(Sweden) Elliot Kaczynski	20	17	25	23	Ret	15	7	8	Ret	9
19	(Argentina) Fausto Arnaudo	23	14	24	7	16	Ret	Ret	22	11	6
20	(Spain) Aleix Piñera	19	Ret	14	21	26	7	15	11	22	6
21	(Greece) Jean-Paul Karras	10	21	9	14	25	12	12	17	9	5
22	(Greece) Philippe Armand Karras	Ret	18	Ret	16	14	Ret	20	7	28†	4
23	(Netherlands) Felipe Reijs	16	Ret	19	18	20	10	16	13	13	1
24	(Mexico) Sebastián Frigolet	22	22	21	24	17	14	10	20	15	1
25	(Portugal) Maria Germano Neto	21	25	12	Ret	21	11	25	16	24	0
26	(Spain) Pablo Riccobono Bello	18	Ret	Ret	20	22	Ret	17	19	12	0
27	(United States) Rahim Alibhai	Ret	19	18	19	19	13	14	15	Ret	0
28	(Romania) Zoe Florescu	17	27†	13	22	28	Ret	21	23	19	0
29	(South Africa) Jorden Moodley	25	23	15	26	29	20				0
30	(Portugal) Max Radeck	NC	24	17	25	27	18	22	14	16	0
31	(France) Louis Cochet	24	20	22	Ret	23	16	Ret	Ret	14	0
32	(United Arab Emirates) Stefano Pedani							23	21	27†	0
33	(Netherlands) Dante Cima	Ret	DNS	26	WD	WD	WD				0
Pos	Driver	R1	SR	R2	R1	SR	R2	R1	SR	R2	Pts
Pos	Driver	POR (Portugal)			JAR (Spain)			ARA (Spain)			Pts

Colour	Result
Gold	Winner
Silver	Second place
Bronze	Third place
Green	Points classification
Blue	Non-points classification
Blue	Non-classified finish (NC)
Purple	Retired, not classified (Ret)
Red	Did not qualify (DNQ)
Red	Did not pre-qualify (DNPQ)
Black	Disqualified (DSQ)
White	Did not start (DNS)
White	Withdrew (WD)
White	Race cancelled (C)
Blank	Did not practice (DNP)
Blank	Did not arrive (DNA)
Blank	Excluded (EX)

**Bold** – Pole
Italics – Fastest Lap
† — Did not finish but classified
Rookie

==== Teams' championship ====
For round one, each teams' two best-placed drivers in the overall standings at the end of the round scored points for the team. For all following rounds, each teams' two best-placed drivers in the overall standings at the start of the round score points for the team. Fastest lap points are included; pole position points are not.

Pos	Driver	No.	POR (Portugal)			JAR (Spain)			ARA (Spain)			Pts
Pos	Driver	No.	R1	SR	R2	R1	SR	R2	R1	SR	R2	Pts
1	(Spain) Griffin Core	22	2	9	7	27	6	2	1	24	23	188
1	(Spain) Griffin Core	81	4	10	2	1	8	1	2	27	6	188
2	(Spain) T-Code	17	3	8	6	4	9	19	18	12	Ret	117
2	(Spain) T-Code	77	6	1	5	17	2	3	13	18	1	117
3	(Netherlands) MP Motorsport	23	Ret	3	3	28†	30	21	3	25	2	114
3	(Netherlands) MP Motorsport	40	5	6	Ret	12	4	4	4	1	18	114
4	(Netherlands) KCL Motorsport	1	9	4	4	6	3	6	9	2	26†	107
4	(Netherlands) KCL Motorsport	21	11	13	20	8	1	8	5	3	4	107
5	(Spain) Drivex	15	8	11	23	9	24	Ret	8	6	20	92
5	(Spain) Drivex	46	1	7	1	15	5	9	19	26	3	92
6	(Spain) Campos Racing	10	14	2	8	11	15	23†	6	9	8	65
6	(Spain) Campos Racing	38	7	5	Ret	5	7	17	Ret	5	7	65
7	(Spain) Monlau Motorsport	73	23	14	24	7	16	Ret	Ret	22	11	16
7	(Spain) Monlau Motorsport	88	13	16	11	Ret	18	24†	Ret	Ret	5	16
8	(Spain) TC Racing	24	27	Ret	16	3	11	Ret	11	Ret	17	15
8	(Spain) TC Racing	78	21	25	12	Ret	21	11	25	16	24	15
9	(Spain) DXR	28	NC	24	17	25	27	18				10
9	(Spain) DXR	44	20	17	25	23	Ret	15	7	8	Ret	10
9	(Spain) DXR	80							10	20	15	10
10	(Switzerland) G4 Racing	9	10	21	9	14	25	12	12	17	9	9
10	(Switzerland) G4 Racing	12							20	7	28†	9
10	(Switzerland) G4 Racing	94	25	23	15	26	29	20				9
11	(Spain) Tecnicar by Amtog	13	19	Ret	14	21	26	7	15	11	22	6
11	(Spain) Tecnicar by Amtog	18	17	27†	13	22	28	Ret	21	23	19	6
12	(Spain) GRS Team	70	Ret	DNS	26	WD	WD	WD				0
12	(Spain) GRS Team	74	18	Ret	Ret	20	22	Ret	17	19	12	0
