= 60 Mini =

International kart racing class

- Category: Kart racing
- Region: International
- Affiliations: CIK-FIA; Automobile Club d'Italia
- Inaugural season: 2020; 6 years ago
- Official website: FIA Karting

60 Mini, also known Minikart or simply Mini, is an international kart racing class sanctioned by the Commission Internationale de Karting (CIK-FIA) for drivers aged 8 to 12. Debuting in international competition in 2020, 60 Mini is the only under-12 direct-drive class homologated by the FIA, as well as the only yet to host a World or European Championship.

The 60 cc Mini class originated in Italy in 1984. Its prominence in national and international championships across Europe led to its recognition by the CIK-FIA in 2020, serving as a feeder category to OK-Junior and OKN-Junior. Several notable drivers have started their international careers in a Mini class, including four-time Formula One World Drivers' Champion Max Verstappen.

ACI Sport have also recognised the derivative Mini Group 3 (Gr.3) class since 2020, using IAME 60 Mini engines. The ACI have also operated a Mini U10 class for drivers aged 10 and under—recognised by the CIK-FIA as Mini-XS—since 2023. Mini ROK is another single-manufacturer category operated by Vortex. The development of the class in the early 21st century has led to concerns about young driver safety, prompting the FIA to regulate its lap times from 2026 onwards.

== History ==
=== Background (1962–1983) ===
The Commission Internationale de Karting (CIK-FIA) was founded in 1962 as a sister commission to the CSI, later known as FISA and the FIA, to govern international kart racing competition. It hosted the first CIK-FIA World Championship in 1964, which has been held annually since. The CIK-FIA began its homologation of distinct classes in the discipline in 1974, when the first 125 cc gearbox category was created for the European Championship: Formula C (FC).

The 100 cc direct-drive category was clarified in 1976, when Formula Europe was introduced to control technical evolutions and costs. The direct-drive classes were adapted in 1981, when the 135 cc Formula K (FK), 100 cc Intercontinental A (ICA), and Junior Intercontinental A (ICA-J) were introduced to the World Championship, European Championship, and World Cup, respectively. Component technical approvals have been mandated by the CIK-FIA since then. The 250 cc superkart category received World Championship–status in 1983, having reached international competition as early as 1976.

=== Early history and development (1984–2019) ===
==== 1984–2000: Debut in Italy ====
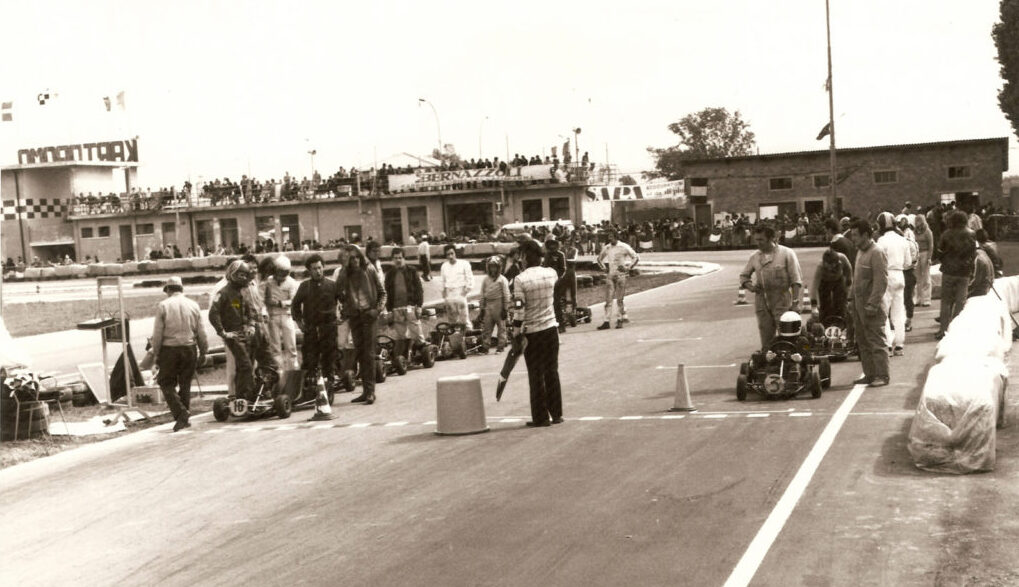
The 60 cc "Minikart" category originated in Italy, where it first appeared at the Torneo delle Industrie in 1984.

The 60 cc "Minikart" class debuted at the Torneo delle Industrie in 1984, which was won by Luca Donati; it has remained in the competition every year since.

==== 2001–2009: National competition across Europe ====
By the 21st century, the Minime (lit. 'Minimal') category had appeared in France and been contested at a national level by Formula One drivers Jules Bianchi, Pierre Gasly, Charles Leclerc, and Esteban Ocon. In the Benelux region, the Mini category had reached a national level and was a starting point for four-time World Drivers' Champion Max Verstappen. The Mini Max category operated by Rotax also developed during this period for drivers aged 9 to 12.

==== 2010–2019: Rise to international prominence ====
The Mini category first appeared at the Andrea Margutti Trophy in 2010, where Alessio Lorandi emerged victorious. The Grand Finals of the Rotax Max Challenge saw the debut of Mini Max in its 2016 edition at Sarno. Several Formula One prodigies emerged in the category throughout the 2010s, including Kimi Antonelli, Gabriel Bortoleto, Isack Hadjar, Arvid Lindblad, Nikita Mazepin, and Logan Sargeant. The rise in Mini's prominence has been attributed to the reduced 15-year minimum age to compete in Formula 4 imposed by the FIA.

=== Recognition by the CIK-FIA (2020–present) ===
==== 2020–2022: Debut and Gr.3 development ====
60 Mini was formally recognised by the CIK-FIA in 2020 to coordinate and unify Mini classes within a single technical regulation. The president of the CIK-FIA, Felipe Massa, underlined the importance of drivers learning their craft on a level playing field. ACI Sport recognised the derivative Mini Group 3 (Gr.3) regulations that year.

==== 2023–present: Introduction of under-10 class ====
In 2023, the CIK-FIA introduced the Mini-XS class for drivers under the age of 10, which was recognised by the ACI as Mini U10 for Gr.3 regulations and debuted at the FIA Motorsport Games in 2024.

== Safety ==
As the Mini category gained prominence in global competition, it also received scrutiny for young driver safety. Described as "a loved and hated category" by Giuliano Ciucci Giuliani of Vroomkart, significant technical evolutions since its debut have vastly increased engine performance. Test data from Kalì Kart in 2024 showed that a 60 Mini kart at Franciacorta could reach top speeds of 106–108 km/h (66–67 mph), with faster cornering speeds than those present in OK-Junior (OK-J). The CIK-FIA responded by significantly reducing the performance of Mini engines, which they further requested from the ACI Sport–homologated Mini Group 3 (Gr.3). The change led to the flight of young drivers to the more accessible and advanced OKN-Junior (OKN-J), having already experienced the higher performance of Gr.3; Fabio Marangon of Vroomkart commented that "it is not the karts that are going too fast, it is our world that has reached an unacceptable speed", with young drivers continually advancing through the pyramid of motor racing from 12 to 18. Drivers such as Andrea Kimi Antonelli and Arvid Lindblad have taken less than seven years to progress from Mini to Formula One.

== See also ==
- OK – the primary direct-drive class
- OK-Junior – the primary junior direct-drive class
- KZ – the primary gearbox class
- KZ2 – the secondary gearbox class
- KZ2-Masters – the senior gearbox class
- OK-N – the secondary direct-drive class
- OKN-Junior – the secondary junior direct-drive class
- Superkart – 250 cc gearbox class
- KF1 – the primary direct-drive class from 2007 to 2012
