= WSK Final Cup =

Kart racing competition

- Category: Kart racing
- Region: Europe
- Inaugural season: 2011
- Constructors: WSK
- Official website: www.wskarting.it

The WSK Final Cup is a kart racing competition organised by the WSK. Its inaugural season took place in 2011. Today, the series holds championships in four karting categories: KZ2, OK, OKJ and 60 Mini. Notable champions have been Formula 2 race winners Callum Ilott and Robert Shwartzman.

== KZ2 Champions ==
| Year | World Champion | Chassis | Engine | Tyre | Second place | Third place | Class | Source |
|---|---|---|---|---|---|---|---|---|
| 2011 | (Netherlands) Bas Lammers | Intrepid | TM | D | (Italy) Roberto Toninelli | (Italy) Marco Ardigò | KZ2 | |
| 2012 | (Italy) Riccardo Negro | DR | TM | D | (Sweden) Joel Johansson | (Italy) Andrea Dalè | KZ2 | |
| 2013 | (Czech Republic) Patrik Hajek | Praga | Parilla | B | (Italy) Davide Forè | (Italy) Mirko Torsellini | KZ2 | |
| 2014 | (Italy) Marco Ardigò | Tony Kart | Vortex | B | (Czech Republic) Patrik Hajek | (Belgium) Jonathan Thonon | KZ2 | |
| 2015 | (Italy) Marco Ardigò | Tony Kart | Vortex | V | (Spain) Jorge Pescador | (Italy) Leonardo Lorandi | KZ2 | |
| 2016 | (Italy) Marco Ardigò | Tony Kart | Vortex | V | (Czech Republic) Patrik Hajek | (Italy) Francesco Iacovacci | KZ2 | |
| 2017 | (Italy) Francesco Iacovacci | Luxor | LKE | B | (Italy) Alessio Lorandi | (Romania) Daniel Vasile | KZ2 | |
| 2018 | (France) Adrien Renaudin | Sodi | TM | B | (France) Emilien Denner | (Netherlands) Dylan Davies | KZ2 | |
| 2019 | (Sweden) Douglas Lundberg | Luxor | TM | B | (Italy) Leonardo Bizzotto | (United Kingdom) Harry Thompson | KZ2 | |
| 2020 | Cancelled due to COVID-19 pandemic | | | | | | | |
| 2021 | (Italy) Francesco Celenta | Parolin | TM | V | (Netherlands) Stan Pex | (Italy) Danilo Albanese | KZ2 | |
| 2022 | (Netherlands) Senna van Walstijn | Sodi | TM | V | (Sweden) Noah Milell | (Italy) Alex Maragliano | KZ2 | |
| 2023 | (Germany) David Trefilov | Maranello | TM | L | Maksim Orlov | (Italy) Cristian Bertuca | KZ2 | |
| 2024 | Maksim Orlov | Sodi | TM | L | (Germany) David Trefilov | (Czech Republic) Marek Skrivan | KZ2 | |

== KF2/KF/OK Champions ==
| Year | World Champion | Chassis | Engine | Tyre | Second place | Third place | Class | Source |
|---|---|---|---|---|---|---|---|---|
| 2011 | (Norway) Dennis Olsen | Energy | TM | V | (Romania) Tomi Dragan | (Russia) Egor Orudzhev | KF2 | |
| 2012 | (Norway) Dennis Olsen | Energy | TM | V | (Brazil) Thiago Vivacqua | (Italy) Damiano Fioravanti | KF2 | |
| 2013 | (United Kingdom) Callum Ilott | Zanardi | Parilla | V | (France) Dorian Boccolacci | (Denmark) Nicklas Nielsen | KF | |
| 2014 | (Poland) Karol Basz | Tony Kart | Vortex | D | (United Kingdom) Max Fewtrell | (Netherlands) Martin van Leeuwen | KF | |
| 2015 | (Denmark) Nicklas Nielsen | Tony Kart | Vortex | V | (Netherlands) Richard Verschoor | (Poland) Karol Basz | KF | |
| 2016 | (Poland) Karol Basz | Kosmic | Vortex | V | (Sweden) Noah Milell | (Italy) Lorenzo Travisanutto | OK | |
| 2017 | (Denmark) Nicklas Nielsen | Tony Kart | Vortex | B | (Italy) Lorenzo Travisanutto | (Spain) David Vidales | OK | |
| 2018 | (Italy) Lorenzo Travisanutto | Kart Republic | Parilla | B | (Netherlands) Kas Haverkort | (Switzerland) Leandro Anderrüti | OK | |
| 2019 | (Spain) Pedro Hiltbrand | Tony Kart | Vortex | B | (United Kingdom) Joe Turney | (Italy) Lorenzo Travisanutto | OK | |
| 2020 | Cancelled due to COVID-19 pandemic | | | | | | | |
| 2021 | (United Kingdom) Arvid Lindblad | Kart Republic | IAME | L | (Bulgaria) Nikola Tsolov | (Jamaica) Alex Powell | OK | |
| 2022 | (United Kingdom) Joe Turney | Tony Kart | Vortes | L | Dmitry Matveev | Anatoly Khavalkin | OK | |
| 2023 | Dmitry Matveev | Kart Republic | IAME | L | (Italy) Sebastiano Pavan | (Belgium) Thibaut Ramaekers | OK | |
| 2024 | (Belgium) Dries Van Langendonck | Exprit | TM | L | (Austria) Niklas Schaufler | (Italy) Sebastiano Pavan | OK | |

== OK-N Champions ==
| Year | World Champion | Chassis | Engine | Tyre | Second place | Third place | Class | Source |
|---|---|---|---|---|---|---|---|---|
| 2023 | (Italy) Lamberto Ferrari | IPK | Modena Engine | V | (Estonia) Robin Sarg | (Italy) Andrea Volpato | OK-N | |
| 2024 | (Italy) Nicolas Marchesi | Kart Republic | IAME | V | (Italy) Antonio Apicella | (Poland) Juliusz Ociepa | OK-N | |

== KF3/KF Junior/OK Junior Champions ==
| Year | World Champion | Chassis | Engine | Tyre | Second place | Third place | Class | Source |
|---|---|---|---|---|---|---|---|---|
| 2011 | (Denmark) Nicklas Nielsen | Tony Kart | Vortes | V | (Monaco) Charles Leclerc | (Russia) Kirill Karpov | KF3 | |
| 2012 | (United Kingdom) Callum Ilott | Zanardi | Parilla | V | (Italy) Alessio Lorandi | (United States) Dalton Sargeant | KF3 | |
| 2013 | (Russia) Robert Shwartzman | Tony Kart | TM | V | (Romania) Petru Florescu | (Italy) Alessio Lorandi | KFJ | |
| 2014 | (Indonesia) Presley Peter Martono | Tony Kart | Vortex | V | (United States) Logan Sargeant | (Italy) Leonardo Lorandi | KFJ | |
| 2015 | (Denmark) Frederik Vesti | Tony Kart | Vortex | V | (France) Charles Milesi | (Spain) David Vidales | KFJ | |
| 2016 | (France) Victor Martins | Kosmic | Parilla | V | (France) Charles Milesi | (Spain) David Vidales | OKJ | |
| 2017 | (Czech Republic) Roman Staněk | Kosmic | Vortex | V | (Russia) Aleksey Brizhan | (Italy) Luca Bosco | OKJ | |
| 2018 | (United Kingdom) Taylor Barnard | Kart Republic | Parilla | V | (Italy) Gabriele Minì | (Russia) Kirill Smal | OKJ | |
| 2019 | (Italy) Andrea Kimi Antonelli | Kart Republic | IAME | V | (Russia) Nikita Bedrin | (Poland) Tymoteusz Kucharczyk | OKJ | |
| 2020 | Cancelled due to COVID-19 pandemic | | | | | | | |
| 2021 | (Spain) Lucas Fluxá | Kart Republic | IAME | V | (Russia) Maksim Orlov | (Russia) Anatoly Khavalkin | OKJ | |
| 2022 | (Italy) Emanuele Olivieri | IPK | TM | V | (Thailand) Enzo Tarnvanichkul | (Scotland) Zac Drummond | OKJ | |
| 2023 | (Belgium) Dries Van Langendonck | Exprit | TM | V | (Austria) Niklas Schaufler | (Spain) Christian Costoya | OKJ | |
| 2024 | (United Kingdom) Noah Baglin | Kart Republic | IAME | V | (Italy) Filippo Sala | (Turkey) Iskender Zulfikari | OKJ | |

== OKN-Junior Champions ==
| Year | World Champion | Chassis | Engine | Tyre | Second place | Third place | Class | Source |
|---|---|---|---|---|---|---|---|---|
| 2023 | (Netherlands) Dean Hoogendoorn | Kart Republic | TM | V | (Romania) Cristofor Bogdan Cosma | (United States) Asher Ochstein | OKN-Junior | |
| 2024 | (Italy) Michele Orlando | DR | Modena Engines | V | (Belgium) Henri Kumpen | (Poland) Leonardo Górski | OKN-J | |

== 60 Mini/Mini Gr3 Champions ==
| Year | World Champion | Chassis | Engine | Tyre | Second place | Third place | Class | Source |
|---|---|---|---|---|---|---|---|---|
| 2011 | (Italy) Lorenzo Travisanutto | Tony Kart | Parilla | V | (Turkey) Berkay Besler | (Romania) Dionisios Marcu | 60 Mini | |
| 2012 | (Italy) Leonardo Lorandi | Tony Kart | LKE | L | (Spain) Eliseo Martinez | (Italy) Federico Sandre | 60 Mini | |
| 2013 | (Italy) Giuseppe Fusco | Lenzo Kart | LKE | L | (Italy) Leonardo Marseglia | (Poland) Maciej Szyszko | 60 Mini | |
| 2014 | (Bulgaria) Dimitri Bogdanov | Tony Kart | LKE | V | (Canada) Antonio Serravalle | (Italy) Leonardo Marseglia | 60 Mini | |
| 2015 | (Italy) Mattia Michelotto | Energy | IAME | V | (Denmark) Lucas Sommerlund | (Italy) Mattia Muller | 60 Mini | |
| 2016 | (Netherlands) Maya Weug | Top Kart | TM | V | (Russia) Kirill Smal | (Italy) Alfio Spina | 60 Mini | |
| 2017 | (Italy) Alfio Spina | CRG | TM | V | (Italy) Andrea Kimi Antonelli | (Poland) Tymoteusz Kucharczyk | 60 Mini | |
| 2018 | (Jamaica) Alex Powell | Energy | TM | V | (Belgium) Ean Eyckmans | (Sweden) Joel Bergström | 60 Mini | |
| 2019 | (Russia) Dmitry Matveev | Energy | TM | V | (Russia) Anatoly Khavalkin | (Russia) Maksimilian Popov | 60 Mini | |
| 2020 | Cancelled due to COVID-19 pandemic | | | | | | | |
| 2021 | (Romania) David Cosma-Cristofor | Kart Republic | IAME | V | (Spain) Christian Costoya | (Netherlands) Dean Hoogendorn | 60 Mini | |
| 2022 | (Turkey) Iskender Zulfikari | Parolin | IAME | V | (Netherlands) Dean Hoogendoorn | (Italy) Filippo Sala | 60 Mini | |
| 2023 | (United States) Devin Walz | Parolin | IAME | V | (Italy) Cristian Blandino | (Peru) Mariano Lopez | Mini Gr3 | |
| 2024 | (Italy) Julian Frasnelli | Parolin | IAME | V | (France) Stan Ratajski | (Switzerland) Albert Tamm | Mini Gr3 | |

== Mini U10 Champions ==
| Year | World Champion | Chassis | Engine | Tyre | Second place | Third place | Class | Source |
|---|---|---|---|---|---|---|---|---|
| 2023 | (Spain) Daniel Miron Lorente | Kart Republic | IAME | V | (Estonia) Mark Loomets | (Italy) Niccolò Perico | Mini Gr3 U10 | |
| 2024 | (Italy) Lorenzo di Pietrantonio | Parolin | IAME | V | (Italy) Niccolò Perico | (Estonia) Mark Loomets | Mini Gr3 U10 | |

== See also ==
- WSK Champions Cup
- WSK Euro Series
- WSK Super Master Series
