= WSK Champions Cup =

- Category: Kart racing
- Region: Europe
- Inaugural season: 2014
- Constructors: WSK
- Official website: www.wskarting.it

The WSK Champions Cup is a European kart racing competition organised by the WSK. Its inaugural season took place in 2014. Today, the series holds championships in four karting categories: KZ2, OK, OKJ and 60 Mini.

== KZ2 Champions ==
Year	Driver	Chassis	Engine	Tyre	Location	Class
2014	(United Kingdom) Ben Hanley	ART GP	TM	B	(Italy) La Conca	KZ2
2016	(Italy) Paolo De Conto	CRG	Maxter	V	(Italy) Adria	KZ2
2017	(Netherlands) Stan Pex	CRG	TM	B	(Italy) Adria	KZ2
2018	(Romania) Daniel Vasile	DR	Modena Engines	B	(Italy) Adria	KZ2
2021	(Sweden) Viktor Gustafsson	Birel ART	TM Racing	V	(Italy) Adria	KZ2
2022	(Netherlands) Senna Van Walstijn	Sodi	TM	V	(Italy) Lonato	KZ2
2023	(Italy) Cristian Bertuca	Birel	TM	V	(Italy) Lonato	KZ2
2024	(Estonia) Markus Kajak	Maranello	TM	V	(Italy) Lonato	KZ2

== KF/OK Champions ==
Year	European Champion	Chassis	Engine	Tyre	Second place	Third place	Location	Class
2014	(Poland) Karol Basz	Tony Kart	Vortex	D	(Italy) Alessio Lorandi	(United Kingdom) Callum Ilott	(Italy) La Conca	KF
2015	(Denmark) Nicklas Nielsen	Tony Kart	Vortex	V	(Netherlands) Richard Verschoor	(Poland) Karol Basz	(Italy) La Conca	KF
2016	(United States) Logan Sargeant	FA Alonso	Vortex	V	(Poland) Karol Basz	(Denmark) Christian Lundgaard	(Italy) Adria	OK
2017	(Spain) Pedro Hiltbrand	Tony Kart	Vortex	B	(Italy) Lorenzo Travisanutto	(Belgium) Ulysse de Pauw	(Italy) Adria	OK
2018	(Denmark) Nicklas Nielsen	Tony Kart	Vortex	B	(Italy) Lorenzo Ferrari	(Barbados) Zane Maloney	(Italy) Adria	OK
2019	(United Kingdom) Taylor Barnard	KR	IAME	B	(Italy) Gabriele Minì	(Italy) Cristian Comanducci	(Italy) Adria	OK
2020	(United Kingdom) Taylor Barnard	KR	IAME	B	(Russia) Kirill Smal	(United Kingdom) Harry Thompson	(Italy) Adria	OK
2021	(Brazil) Rafael Câmara	KR	IAME	L	(Italy) Andrea Kimi Antonelli	(United Kingdom) Arvid Lindblad	(Italy) Adria	OK
2022	(Italy) Danny Carenini	KR	IAME	L	(Russia) Maksimilian Popov	(United Kingdom) Coskun Irfan	(Italy) Lonato	OK
2023	(Denmark) David Walther	Tony Kart	Vortex	L	(Hungary) Martin Molnár	(Latvia) Tomass Štolcermanis	(Italy) Lonato	OK
2024	(Ukraine) Oleksandr Bondarev	KR	IAME	L	(Israel) Guy Albag	(Colombia) Salim Hanna	(Italy) Lonato	OK

== KF Junior/OK Junior Champions ==
Year	World Champion	Chassis	Engine	Tyre	Second place	Third place	Location	Class
2014	(United Kingdom) Enaam Ahmed	FA Kart	Vortex	V	(United Kingdom) Max Fewtrell	(United Kingdom) Dan Ticktum	(Italy) La Conca	KFJ
2015	(United States) Logan Sargeant	FA Alonso	Vortex	V	(Denmark) Christian Lundgaard	(Brazil) Felipe Drugovich	(Italy) La Conca	KFJ
2016	(United Kingdom) Kiern Jewiss	Ricciardo Kart	Parilla	V	(France) Timothy Peisselon	(United Kingdom) Finn Kenneally	(Italy) Adria	OKJ
2017	(Russia) Ilya Morozov	Tony Kart	Vortex	V	(France) Gillian Henrion	(Russia) Pavel Bulantsev	(Italy) Adria	OKJ
2018	(Estonia) Paul Aron	FA Kart	Vortex	V	(United Kingdom) Harry Thompson	(Russia) Kirill Smal	(Italy) Adria	OKJ
2019	(Republic of Ireland) Alex Dunne	Exprit	TM	V	(United Kingdom) Arvid Lindblad	(Netherlands) Thomas ten Brinke	(Italy) Adria	OKJ
2020	(Italy) Alfio Spina	KR	IAME	V	(Norway) Martinius Stenshorne	(Singapore) Christian Ho	(Italy) Adria	OKJ
2021	(United Arab Emirates) Rashid Al Dhaheri	Parolin	TM	V	(Japan) Kean Nakamura-Berta	(United Kingdom) Harley Keeble	(Italy) Adria	OKJ
2022	(Peru) Andrés Cárdenas	Energy	TM	V	(China) Zhenrui Chi	(United Kingdom) Nathan Tye	(Italy) Lonato	OKJ
2023	(United Kingdom) Lewis Wherrell	Exprit	TM	V	(Austria) Niklas Schaufler	(Germany) Taym Saleh	(Italy) Lonato	OKJ
2024	(Austria) Niklas Schaufler	KR	IAME	V	(Belgium) Dries Van Langendonck	(Italy) Filippo Sala	(Italy) Lonato	OKJ

== OKN-Junior Champions ==
Year	World Champion	Chassis	Engine	Tyre	Second place	Third place	Location	Class
2023	(United Kingdom) Lewis Wherrell	Exprit	TM	V	(Austria) Niklas Schaufler	(Germany) Taym Saleh	(Italy) Lonato	OKN-Junior
2024	(Bulgaria) Lyuboslav Ruykov	Tony Kart	TM	V	(Slovakia) Alex Molota	(Romania) Bogdan Cosma Cristofor	(Italy) Lonato	OKN-Junior

== 60 Mini/Mini Gr3 Champions ==
Year	World Champion	Chassis	Engine	Tyre	Second place	Third place	Location	Class
2014	(Malaysia) Muizzuddin Gafar	Hero	LKE	V	(Italy) Giuseppe Fusco	(Russia) Bogdan Fetisov	(Italy) La Conca	60 Mini
2015	(Norway) Dennis Hauger	CRG	LKE	V	(Italy) Luigi Coluccio	(Italy) Giuseppe Fusco	(Italy) La Conca	60 Mini
2016	(Italy) Michael Barbaro Paparo	IP Karting	TM	V	(Italy) Francesco Pizzi	(Poland) Tymoteusz Kucharczyk	(Italy) Adria	60 Mini
2017	(Italy) Alfio Spina	CRG	TM	V	(Italy) Gabriele Minì	(Russia) Nikita Bedrin	(Italy) Adria	60 Mini
2018	(Italy) Andrea Kimi Antonelli	Energy	TM	V	(Norway) Martinius Stenshorne	(Italy) Brando Badoer	(Italy) Adria	60 Mini
2019	(Italy) Andrea Filaferro	Tony Kart	TM	V	(Italy) Francesco Marenghi	(United Arab Emirates) Rashid Al Dhaheri	(Italy) Adria	60 Mini
2020	(Russia) Anatoly Khavalkin	Parolin	TM	V	(Russia) Gerasim Skulanov	(United Arab Emirates) Rashid Al Dhaheri	(Italy) Adria	60 Mini
2021	(Netherlands) René Lammers	Parolin	IAME	V	(Italy) Emanuele Olivieri	(Singapore) Tiziano Monza	(Italy) Adria	60 Mini
2022	(Spain) Christian Costoya	Parolin	TM	V	(Czech Republic) Jindrich Pesl	(Netherlands) Dean Hoogendoorn	(Italy) Lonato	60 Mini
2023	(Turkey) Iskender Zulfikari	Parolin	IAME	V	(Italy) Vladimir Ivannikov	(Romania) Cristofor Bogdan Cosma	(Italy) Lonato	Mini Gr3
2024	(Italy) Cristian Blandino	TGroup	TM	V	(Australia) William Caleja	Mark Pilipenko	(Italy) Lonato	Mini Gr3

== Mini U10 Champions ==
Year	World Champion	Chassis	Engine	Tyre	Second place	Third place	Location	Class
2023	(Ukraine) Oleksandr Legenkyi	KR	IAME	V	(Belgium) Antoine Venant	(Poland) Leonardo Gorski	(Italy) Lonato	Mini U10
2024	(Italy) Niccolò Perico	Energy	TM	V	(Scotland) Mason Robertson	(Italy) Lorenzo di Pietrantonio	(Italy) Lonato	Mini U10

== See also ==
- WSK Euro Series
- WSK Final Cup
- WSK Super Master Series
