= Christopher El Feghali =

Lebanese racing driver (born 2009)

- كريستوفر الفغالي
- Born: 29 August 2009 (age 17); Baabda, Lebanon
- Relatives: Roger Feghali (uncle)
- Nationality: (Lebanon) Lebanese

Eurocup-3 career
- Debut season: 2025
- Current team: Drivex
- Car number: 7
- Starts: 21
- Wins: 1
- Podiums: 1
- Poles: 2
- Fastest laps: 1
- Best finish: 10th in 2026

Previous series
- 2026 2025 2025 2024–2025: Eurocup-3 Spanish Winter; F4 Saudi Arabian; Eurocup-4 Spanish Winter; F4 Spanish
- Statistics up to date as of 10 November 2026.

Christopher El Feghali (Arabic: كريستوفر الفغالي; born 29 August 2009) is a Lebanese racing driver who last competed in Eurocup-3 for Drivex.

Born and raised in Baabda, El Feghali is the nephew of seventeen-time Lebanese Rally Champion Roger Feghali. He began competitive kart racing aged four, winning several national and continental titles before progressing to junior formulae in 2024. El Feghali is a former member of the Red Bull Junior Team.

== Early life ==
El Feghali was born on 29 August 2009 in Wadi Chahrour El Suflah, a suburb in Baabda, Lebanon. His father, Abdo Feghali, is a rally driver. His uncle, Roger Feghali, and cousin Alex are also rally drivers, the former a record seventeen-time Lebanese Rally Champion and sixteen-time winner of the Rally of Lebanon.

== Racing career ==
=== Karting (2017–2024) ===
El Feghali began karting at the age of four. After winning the Lebanese Championship in 2017 and 2018, he made his debut in international competition during the latter year, taking part in the RMC Grand Finals in the Micro Max class. He remained in Micro Max over the next two years, claiming runner-up in the Lebanese Championship the following year, before winning the MENA Nations Cup and the RMC International Trophy in 2020.

Stepping up to Mini Max in 2021, El Feghali once again won the RMC International Trophy and the MENA Nations Cup—which he won in both the Mini and Micro classes. Continuing in Mini in 2022, he won the RMC Grand Finals and finished third in the RMC International Trophy on his Junior Max debut. He progressed to Junior Max full-time in 2023, contesting the Rotax Max Euro Trophy and the inaugural Champions of the Future Academy Program, whilst also making his sole appearance in the World Championship at Franciacorta, where he finished thirteenth.

El Feghali then closed his karting career with his 2024 campaign in Senior Max, winning the Lebanese Championship before joining the Red Bull Junior Team after entering their Driver Search programme during the summer.

=== Formula 4 (2024–present) ===
==== 2024 ====
Following his successes in kart racing, El Feghali made his junior formulae debut in the F4 Spanish Championship, contesting the final two rounds as a guest driver for Drivex; across the two rounds, he took a best result of twelfth in race one at Barcelona-Catalunya.

==== 2025 ====
Remaining with Drivex for 2025, El Feghali competed in the pre-season Eurocup-4 Spanish Winter Championship as he also returned for his full rookie season in the F4 Spanish Championship. In the Winter Championship, he took his maiden podium on debut at Jerez by finishing third, before repeating the same feat at Portimão, which helped him to secure tenth in the standings. In the main championship, El Feghali finished fifteenth and eighteenth in the first two races at Aragón, before taking his maiden points in race three by finishing seventh. After a top result of ninth at Navarra, he achieved his maiden podium in the series with his third-placed finish in race two at Portimão, which turned out to be his only podium of the season as he finished no higher than sixth in the remaining four rounds to end the year 13th in points. At the end of the year, El Fehgali made a one-off appearance in the season-ending Jeddah round of the F4 Saudi Arabian Championship.

=== Formula Regional (2025–present) ===
During 2025, El Feghali made his Eurocup-3 debut for Drivex at the Spa round. At the start of the following year, the Lebanese driver raced with the same team in the Eurocup-3 Spanish Winter Championship, in which he scored a best result of sixth in race one at Algarve. In the main series, El Feghali won the Le Castellet sprint, before taking poles at Algarve and Monza to end the year tenth in overall points.

== Karting record ==
=== Karting career summary ===
Season	Series	Team	Position
2017	Lebanese Championship — Micro Max		1st
2018	Lebanese Championship — Micro Max		1st
2018	RMC Grand Finals — Micro Max	Azimut Automotive	9th
2019	Lebanese Championship — Micro Max		2nd
2019	RMC International Trophy — Micro Max	Dan Holland Racing	4th
2020	MENA Nations Cup — Micro Max	Lebanon	1st
2020	RMC International Trophy — Micro Max	Dan Holland Racing	1st
2021	MENA Nations Cup — Micro Max	Lebanon	1st
2021	MENA Nations Cup — Mini Max	Lebanon	1st
2021	RMC International Trophy — Mini Max	Christopher Feghali	1st
2021	RMC Grand Finals — Mini Max	Azimut Automotive	8th
2022	Rotax Max Euro Trophy — Junior Max	Dan Holland Racing	32nd
2022	RMC International Trophy — Mini Max	Dan Holland Racing	3rd
2022	RMC Grand Finals — Mini Max	Azimut Automotive	1st
2023	Rotax Max Euro Trophy — Junior Max	Dan Holland Racing	50th
2023	RMC Grand Finals — Junior Max	Dan Holland Racing	33rd
2023	Rotax Max Challenge UAE — Junior Max		3rd
2023	Champions of the Future — OK-J	KR Motorsport	155th
2023	CIK-FIA World Championship — OK-J	KR Motorsport	13th
2023	Champions of the Future — OK-N		9th
2023	IAME Euro Series — X30 Junior	George Gibbons Motorsport	20th
2023	IAME Warriors Final — X30 Junior	George Gibbons Motorsport	34th
2024	Lebanese Championship — Senior Max		1st
Sources: (Note: Additional references are stated in § Karting (2017–2024).)

== Racing record ==
=== Racing career summary ===
Season	Series	Team	Races	Wins	Poles	F/Laps	Podiums	Points	Position
2024	F4 Spanish Championship	Drivex	6	0	0	0	0	0	NC†
2025	Eurocup-4 Spanish Winter Championship	Drivex	9	0	0	0	2	31	10th
2025	F4 Spanish Championship	Drivex	21	0	0	1	1	53	13th
2025	Eurocup-3	Drivex	2	0	0	0	0	0	24th
2025	F4 Saudi Arabian Championship	Red Bull	2	0	0	0	1	15	14th
2026	Eurocup-3 Spanish Winter Championship	Drivex	9	0	0	0	0	16	13th
2026	Eurocup-3	Drivex	19	1	2	1	1	64	10th

^{†} As El Feghali was a guest driver, he was ineligible for championship points.
* Season still in progress.

=== Complete F4 Spanish Championship results ===
(key) (Races in bold indicate pole position; races in italics indicate fastest lap)

Year	Team	1	2	3	4	5	6	7	8	9	10	11	12	13	14	15	16	17	18	19	20	21	DC	Points
2024	Drivex	JAR; 1	JAR; 2	JAR; 3	POR; 1	POR; 2	POR; 3	LEC; 1	LEC; 2	LEC; 3	ARA; 1	ARA; 2	ARA; 3	CRT; 1	CRT; 2	CRT; 3	JER; 1; 20	JER; 2; 17	JER; 3; 30†	CAT; 1; 12	CAT; 2; 29	CAT; 3; 14	NC‡	—
2025	Drivex	ARA; 1; 15	ARA; 2; 18	ARA; 3; 7	NAV; 1; 10	NAV; 2; 9	NAV; 3; 24†	POR; 1; 5	POR; 2; 3	POR; 3 Ret	LEC; 1; 6	LEC; 2; 10	LEC; 3; 26	JER; 1; 7	JER; 2; 6	JER; 3; 22	CRT; 1; 14	CRT; 2 Ret	CRT; 3; 31	CAT; 1; 12	CAT; 2; 9	CAT; 3; 27	13th	53

^{‡} As El Feghali was a guest driver, he was ineligible for championship points.

=== Complete Eurocup-4 Spanish Winter Championship results ===
(key) (Races in bold indicate pole position; races in italics indicate fastest lap)

Year	Team	1	2	3	4	5	6	7	8	9	DC	Points
2025	Drivex	JER; 1; 3	JER; 2 Ret	JER; 3 Ret	POR; 1; 3	POR; 2; 9	POR; 3; 11	NAV; 1 Ret	NAV; 2 Ret	NAV; 3; 25	10th	31

=== Complete Eurocup-3 results ===
(key) (Races in bold indicate pole position) (Races in italics indicate fastest lap)

Year	Team	1	2	3	4	5	6	7	8	9	10	11	12	13	14	15	16	17	18	19	DC	Points
2025	Drivex	RBR; 1	RBR; 2	POR; 1	POR; SR	POR; 2	LEC; 1	LEC; SR	LEC; 2	MNZ; 1	MNZ; 2	ASS; 1	ASS; 2	SPA; 1; 14	SPA; 2; 12	JER; 1	JER; 2	CAT; 1	CAT; 2		24th	0
2026	Drivex	LEC; 1; 14	LEC; SR; 1	LEC; 2; 9	**POR**; **1**; 9	POR; 2 Ret	IMO; 1 Ret	IMO; SR; 15	IMO; 2; 8	MNZ; 1; 4	**MNZ**; **2**; 7	SIL; 1; 11	SIL; 2; 14	JER; 1; 9	JER; SR; 7	JER; 2; 6	HUN; 1; 10	HUN; 2; 24	CAT; 1 Ret	CAT; 2; 6	10th	64

=== Complete Eurocup-3 Spanish Winter Championship results ===
(key) (Races in bold indicate pole position) (Races in italics indicate fastest lap)

Year	Team	1	2	3	4	5	6	7	8	9	DC	Points
2026	Drivex	POR; 1; 6	POR; SPR; 8	POR; 2 Ret	JAR; 1; 8	JAR; SPR; Ret	JAR; 2; 25†	ARA; 1; 9	ARA; SPR; 26†	ARA; 2; 22†	11th	17
