= Santino Panetta =

Argentine racing driver (born 2009)

- Nationality: (Argentina) Argentine
- Born: 10 December 2009 (age 16) Campana, Buenos Aires, Argentina

Eurocup-3 career
- Debut season: 2026
- Current team: Hitech
- Car number: 39
- Starts: 19
- Wins: 0
- Podiums: 0
- Poles: 0
- Fastest laps: 0
- Best finish: 15th in 2026

Previous series
- 2026 2025 2025: Eurocup-3 Spanish Winter; F4 Spanish; Eurocup-4 Spanish Winter

Santino Panetta (born 10 December 2009) is an Argentine racing driver who last competed in Eurocup-3 for Hitech.

Panetta is a member of Bullet Sports Management and is coached by Lucas Benamo.

== Personal life ==
Panetta is the older brother of fellow racing driver Bautista Panetta.

== Career ==
=== Karting ===
Panetta began karting in 2018, competing until 2024. Starting out in mini karts, Panetta most notably won the 2021 RMC Buenos Aires title, which earned him an invitation to the RMC Grand Finals, as well as finishing eighth overall in the South Garda Winter Cup. Moving up to junior karts for the next two seasons, Panetta sealed the 2021–22 Argentinian Championship, as well as finishing fourth in the 2023 Karting Academy Trophy while representing Argentina. For his final year of karting in 2024, Panetta moved up to OK, as he became a factory driver for CRG Racing Team in Europe.

=== Formula 4 ===
In 2025, Panetta moved up to single-seaters, joining TC Racing for a dual campaign in the Eurocup-4 Spanish Winter and F4 Spanish Championships. In the former, Panetta took a best result of 11th at Algarve to end the three-round series 21st in the overall standings. After a quiet start to the main season, which saw him take a best result of 11th twice, Panetta took a season-best seventh at Valencia and two points finishes at Barcelona to end the year 18th in points.

=== Formula Regional ===
Ahead of 2026, Panetta joined Hitech for a dual campaign in the Eurocup-3 Spanish Winter Championship and the main series. In the three-round Winter Championship, Panetta took his first points in the Jarama sprint, before taking his best result of seventh in the Aragón sprint to take 18th in overall points. Panetta then began the main series with double points finishes at Le Castellet and Algarve, before further points finishes at Imola and Silverstone. In the final three rounds, Panetta scored points four times, which included his season-best result of fifth at the Hungaroring to end the year 15th overall.

== Karting record ==
=== Karting career summary ===
Season	Series	Team	Position
2019	Rok Cup Superfinal — Mini Rok		
2020	South Garda Winter Cup — Mini Rok	Maldonado Luciana Belen	40th
2020	WSK Super Master Series — 60 Mini	RCK	94th
2021	RMC Buenos Aires — Mini Max		1st
2021	WSK Euro Series — 60 Mini	Gamoto ASD	97th
2021	Italian Karting Championship — Mini Gr.3		76th
2021	IAME Warriors Final — X30 Mini	Gamoto ASD	20th
2021	Trofeo Delle Industrie — 60 Mini	Gamoto SNC	25th
2021	South Garda Winter Cup — Mini Rok	Gamoto ASD	8th
2021	WSK Final Cup — 60 Mini	Gamoto ASD	NC
2021	RMC Grand Finals — Mini Max	Diego Alejandro Panetta	11th
2021–22	Argentinian Championship — Junior		1st
2022	Andrea Margutti Trophy — X30 Junior	Gamoto Srl	29th
2022	Karting Academy Trophy	Federico Damian Panetta	11th
2022	Italian Karting Championship — X30 Junior		33rd
2022	Karting World Championship — OK-J	Gamoto Srl	86th
2023	South Garda Winter Cup — OK-J	Gamoto Srl	18th
2023	WSK Champions Cup — OK-J	Gamoto Srl	43rd
2023	WSK Super Master Series — OK-J	Gamoto Srl	94th
2023	Italian Karting Championship — OK-J		13th
2023	Champions of the Future Euro Series — OK-J	Gamoto Srl	39th
2023	Karting Academy Trophy	Federico Panetta	4th
2023	Karting World Championship — OK-J	Gamoto Srl	87th
2024	WSK Super Master Series — OK	CRG Racing Team	43rd
2024	Champions of the Future Euro Series — OK	CRG Racing Team	54th
2024	Karting European Championship — OK	CRG Racing Team	38th
2024	WSK Euro Series — OK	CRG Racing Team	43rd
2024	Karting World Championship — OK	CRG Racing Team	77th

== Racing record ==
=== Racing career summary ===
Season	Series	Team	Races	Wins	Poles	F/Laps	Podiums	Points	Position
2025	Eurocup-4 Spanish Winter Championship	TC Racing	8	0	0	0	0	0	21st
2025	F4 Spanish Championship	TC Racing	21	0	0	0	0	9	18th
2026	Eurocup-3 Spanish Winter Championship	Hitech	9	0	0	0	0	8	18th
2026	Eurocup-3	Hitech	19	0	0	0	0	36	15th

=== Complete Eurocup-4 Spanish Winter Championship results ===
(key) (Races in bold indicate pole position) (Races in italics indicate fastest lap)

Year	Team	1	2	3	4	5	6	7	8	9	DC	Points
2025	TC Racing	JER; 1; 22	JER; 2; 22	JER; 3 Ret	POR; 1; 18	POR; 2; 11	POR; 3; 24	NAV; 1; 26	NAV; 2; 16	NAV; 3; 14	21st	0

=== Complete F4 Spanish Championship results ===
(key) (Races in bold indicate pole position; races in italics indicate fastest lap)

Year	Team	1	2	3	4	5	6	7	8	9	10	11	12	13	14	15	16	17	18	19	20	21	DC	Points
2025	TC Racing	ARA; 1; 11	ARA; 2; 13	ARA; 3; 13	NAV; 1 Ret	NAV; 2; 14	NAV; 3; 13	POR; 1; 12	POR; 2 Ret	POR; 3; 27	LEC; 1 Ret	LEC; 2; 12	LEC; 3; 11	JER; 1 Ret	JER; 2; 24	JER; 3; 25	CRT; 1; 7	CRT; 2; 10	CRT; 3; 24	CAT; 1; 33†	CAT; 2; 10	CAT; 3; 11	18th	9

=== Complete Eurocup-3 Spanish Winter Championship results ===
(key) (Races in bold indicate pole position) (Races in italics indicate fastest lap)

Year	Team	1	2	3	4	5	6	7	8	9	DC	Points
2026	Hitech	POR; 1; 17	POR; SR; 19	POR; 2; 14	JAR; 1; 13	JAR; SR; 9	JAR; 2; 11	ARA; 1; 12	ARA; SR; 7	ARA; 2; 9	18th	8

=== Complete Eurocup-3 results ===
(key) (Races in bold indicate pole position; races in italics indicate fastest lap)

Year	Team	1	2	3	4	5	6	7	8	9	10	11	12	13	14	15	16	17	18	19	DC	Points
2026	Hitech	LEC; 1; 10	LEC; SR; 11	LEC; 2; 8	POR; 1; 10	POR; 2; 8	IMO; 1; 9	IMO; SR; Ret	IMO; 2; 15	MNZ; 1; 16	MNZ; 2; 21†	SIL; 1; 8	SIL; 2; 16	JER; 1; 26†	JER; SR; 15	JER; 2; 9	HUN; 1; 5	HUN; 2; 7	CAT; 1; 14	CAT; 2; 9	15th	36
