= Thomas Strauven =

Belgian racing driver (born 2008)

- Born: 4 April 2008 (age 18); Houthalen-Helchteren, Belgium
- Nationality: (Belgium) Belgian

Eurocup-3 career
- Debut season: 2026
- Current team: Griffin Core by Campos
- Car number: 9
- Starts: 19
- Wins: 0
- Podiums: 1
- Poles: 0
- Fastest laps: 0
- Best finish: 11th in 2026

Previous series
- 2026; 2026; 2025; 2023–2025; 2024: FR European; Eurocup-3 Spanish Winter; Eurocup-4 Spanish Winter; F4 Spanish; Formula Winter Series

Championship titles
- 2025; 2025: F4 Spanish; Eurocup-4 Spanish Winter

Thomas Strauven (born 4 April 2008) is a Belgian racing driver who last competed in Eurocup-3 for Griffin Core by Campos.

He is the 2025 F4 Spanish and 2025 Eurocup-4 Spanish Winter champion.

== Career ==
=== Karting (2017–2023) ===
Strauven began karting in 2017, competing until 2023. During his karting career, he most notably won the 2019 RMC International Trophy in the Micro Max class, along with the BNL Karting Series title in Junior Max the following year. Following that, Strauven finished runner-up in the 2021 IAME International Games in X30 Junior, 2022 LeCont Trophy and the 2023 WSK Super Master Series in OK before stepping up to single-seaters the same year.

=== Formula 4 (2023–2025) ===
==== 2023 ====
In late 2023, Strauven made his single-seaters debut with MP Motorsport in the Jerez round of the F4 Spanish Championship. He achieved a best finish of 13th in race three, retiring in the other two.

==== 2024 ====
The following year, Strauven embarked on his first full-time campaign in single-seaters in Formula Winter Series for Rodin Motorsport. After finishing outside of the points three of the four rounds, Strauven took his only win at Aragón in race two, a round in which he scored his only two other points finishes en route to a 12th-place points finish at season's end. Remaining with Rodin for the rest of the year, Strauven drove with them for his first full season in the F4 Spanish Championship. Starting off the season with a third-place finish and a win at Jarama, Strauven then scored a pair of third-place finishes in the second round at Algarve to enter Le Castellet third points. Four podiums later, Strauven scored his fifth and final podium of the season at Jerez by finishing third in race three to end the year seventh in points despite missing the season-finale at Barcelona.

==== 2025 ====
Strauven remained in the Iberian peninsula for 2025, joining Campos Racing to race in both the Eurocup-4 Spanish Winter and F4 Spanish Championships. In the three-round winter series, Strauven scored two wins at Algarve and four more podiums to clinch the title in the finale at Navarra. In the main season, Strauven opened up the season by winning at Aragón and scoring four podiums in the next five races, before winning five of the following six races across the Algarve and Le Castellet rounds to take the points lead. Following a seventh win of the season at Jerez, Strauven won the first two races of the following round at Valencia to secure the Spanish F4 title with a round to spare. Strauven then won race one of the season-ending round at Barcelona and finished in the top-five in the other two races to end the year 157 points ahead of Ean Eyckmans.

=== Formula Regional (2026) ===
Strauven stepped up to Eurocup-3 competition in 2026, as he remained with Campos Racing for a second season with them.

Alongside his Eurocup-3 campaign, Strauven also competed in the second and third rounds of the Formula Regional European Championship with CL Motorsport.

== Karting record ==
=== Karting career summary ===
Season	Series	Team(s)	Position
2017	BNL Golden Trophy - Micro Max		5th
2019	IAME Euro Series - X30 Mini	P1 Racing	53rd
2019	BNL Karting Series - Rotax Micro Max		2nd
2019	RMC International Trophy - Micro Max	GKS Lemmens Power	1st
2019	IAME Series Benelux - X30 Mini		20th
2020	IAME Winter Cup - X30 Mini	Strawberry Racing	7th
2020	IAME International Games - X30 Mini	Strawberry Racing	30th
2020	RMC International Trophy - Mini Max		3rd
2020	BNL Karting Series - Rotax Mini Max	Daems Racing Team	1st
2020	Rotax Max Euro Trophy - Junior Max	Daems Racing Team	34th
2020	IAME Euro Series - X30 Junior		10th
2021	WSK Final Cup - OK-J	Ricky Flynn Motorsport	28th
2021	BNL Karting Series - Rotax Max Junior		19th
2021	Rotax Max Euro Trophy - Junior Max	Strawberry Racing	6th
2021	IAME International Games - X30 Junior	Privateer	2nd
2022	FIA Karting European Championship - OK-J	Ricky Flynn Motorsport	11th
2022	FIA Karting World Championship - OK-J	Ricky Flynn Motorsport	35th
2022	LeCont Trophy - OK	Ricky Flynn Motorsport	2nd
2022	Italian Karting Championship - OK-J	Ricky Flynn Motorsport	13th
2022	Champions of the Future - OK-J	Kart Republic Motorsport	10th
2023	WSK Super Master Series - OK	Ricky Flynn Motorsport / Kart Republic	2nd
2023	FIA Karting European Championship - OK	Kart Republic Motorsport	30th

== Racing record ==
=== Racing career summary ===
Year	Series	Team	Races	Wins	Poles	F/Laps	Podiums	Points	Position
2023	F4 Spanish Championship	MP Motorsport	3	0	0	0	0	0	32nd
2024	Formula Winter Series	Rodin Motorsport	11	1	0	0	1	30	12th
2024	F4 Spanish Championship	Rodin Motorsport	18	1	1	3	5	122	7th
2025	Eurocup-4 Spanish Winter Championship	Griffin Core by Campos	9	2	3	4	6	142	**1st**
2025	F4 Spanish Championship	Griffin Core by Campos	21	10	10	11	17	392	**1st**
2026	Eurocup-3 Spanish Winter Championship	Campos Racing	9	0	0	1	0	43	8th
2026	Eurocup-3	Campos Racing	19	0	0	0	1	61	11th
2026	Formula Regional European Championship	CL Motorsport	4	0	0	0	0	0	37th

* Season still in progress.

=== Complete F4 Spanish Championship results ===
(key) (Races in bold indicate pole position) (Races in italics indicate fastest lap)

Year	Team	1	2	3	4	5	6	7	8	9	10	11	12	13	14	15	16	17	18	19	20	21	DC	Points
2023	MP Motorsport	SPA; 1	SPA; 2	SPA; 3	ARA; 1	ARA; 2	ARA; 3	NAV; 1	NAV; 2	NAV; 3	JER; 1 Ret	JER; 2 Ret	JER; 3; 13	EST; 1	EST; 2	EST; 3	CRT; 1	CRT; 2	CRT; 3	CAT; 1	CAT; 2	CAT; 3	32nd	0
2024	Rodin Motorsport	JAR; 1; 3	**JAR**; **2**; 1	JAR; 3; 10	POR; 1; 3	POR; 2 Ret	POR; 3; 3	LEC; 1; 6	LEC; 2; 9	LEC; 3; 12	ARA; 1; 17	ARA; 2; 10	ARA; 3; 8	CRT; 1; 4	CRT; 2; 8	CRT; 3; 5	JER; 1; 9	JER; 2; 9	JER; 3; 3	CAT; 1	CAT; 2	CAT; 3	7th	122
2025	Griffin Core by Campos	ARA; 1; 1	**ARA**; **2**; 34	**ARA**; **3**; 3	**NAV**; **1**; 3	**NAV**; **2**; 2	NAV; 3; 2	**POR**; **1**; 1	**POR**; **1**; 1	POR; 1; 1	LEC; 1; 1	LEC; 2; 3	LEC; 3; 1	JER; 1; 2	JER; 2; 9	JER; 3; 1	**CRT**; **1**; 1	**CRT**; **2**; 1	**CRT**; **3**; 2	**CAT**; **1**; 1	CAT; 2; 5	CAT; 3; 4	1st	392

=== Complete Formula Winter Series results ===
(key) (Races in bold indicate pole position; races in italics indicate fastest lap)

Year	Team	1	2	3	4	5	6	7	8	9	10	11	12	DC	Points
2024	Rodin Motorsport	JER; 1; 11	JER; 2; 13	JER; 3; 17	CRT; 1; 18	CRT; 2; 22	CRT; 3; 20	ARA; 1; 8	ARA; 2; 1	ARA; 3; 10	CAT; 1 C	CAT; 2; 21	CAT; 3; 23	12th	30

=== Complete Eurocup-4 Spanish Winter Championship results ===
(key) (Races in bold indicate pole position) (Races in italics indicate fastest lap)

Year	Team	1	2	3	4	5	6	7	8	9	DC	Points
2025	Griffin Core by Campos	JER; 1; 2	JER; 2; 28	JER; 3; 4	**POR**; **1**; 1	POR; 2; 1	**POR**; **3**; 2	**NAV**; **1**; 2	NAV; 2; 3	NAV; 3; 4	1st	143

=== Complete Eurocup-3 Spanish Winter Championship results ===
(key) (Races in bold indicate pole position) (Races in italics indicate fastest lap)

Year	Team	1	2	3	4	5	6	7	8	9	DC	Points
2026	Campos Racing	POR; 1; 4	POR; SPR; 7	POR; 2; 5	JAR; 1 Ret	JAR; SPR; 7	JAR; 2; 8	ARA; 1; 10	ARA; SPR; 4	ARA; 2; 19	8th	43

=== Complete Eurocup-3 results ===
(key) (Races in bold indicate pole position; races in italics indicate fastest lap)

Year	Team	1	2	3	4	5	6	7	8	9	10	11	12	13	14	15	16	17	18	19	DC	Points
2026	Griffin Core	LEC; 1; 11	LEC; SR; 8	LEC; 2; 16	POR; 1 Ret	POR; 2; 5	IMO; 1; 7	IMO; SR; 9	IMO; 2; 7	MNZ; 1; 7	MNZ; 2; 18	SIL; 1; 12	SIL; 2; 13	JER; 1; 2	JER; SR; 12	JER; 2; 13	HUN; 1; 11	HUN; 2; 9	CAT; 1; 9	CAT; 2; 7	11th	61

=== Complete Formula Regional European Championship results ===
(key) (Races in bold indicate pole position) (Races in italics indicate fastest lap)

Year	Team	1	2	3	4	5	6	7	8	9	10	11	12	13	14	15	16	17	18	19	20	DC	Points
2026	CL Motorsport	RBR; 1	RBR; 2	RBR; 3	ZAN; 1; 23	ZAN; 2; 20	SPA; 1; 23	SPA; 2 C	SPA; 3; 24	MNZ; 1	MNZ; 2	MNZ; 3	HUN; 1	HUN; 2	LEC; 1	LEC; 2	IMO; 1	IMO; 2	IMO; 3	HOC; 1	HOC; 2	37th	0
