= Miguel Costa =

Miguel Costa may refer to:

- Miquel Costa i Llobera (1854–1922), also written as Miguel Costa y Llobera, Spanish poet and clergyman from Catalonia
- Miguel Costa (revolutionary) (1885–1959), Brazilian revolutionary and general
- Miguel Costa Matos (born 1994), Portuguese politician
- Miguel Costa (racing driver) (born 2009), Brazilian-American racing driver
