= Jan Przyrowski =

Polish racing driver (born 2008)

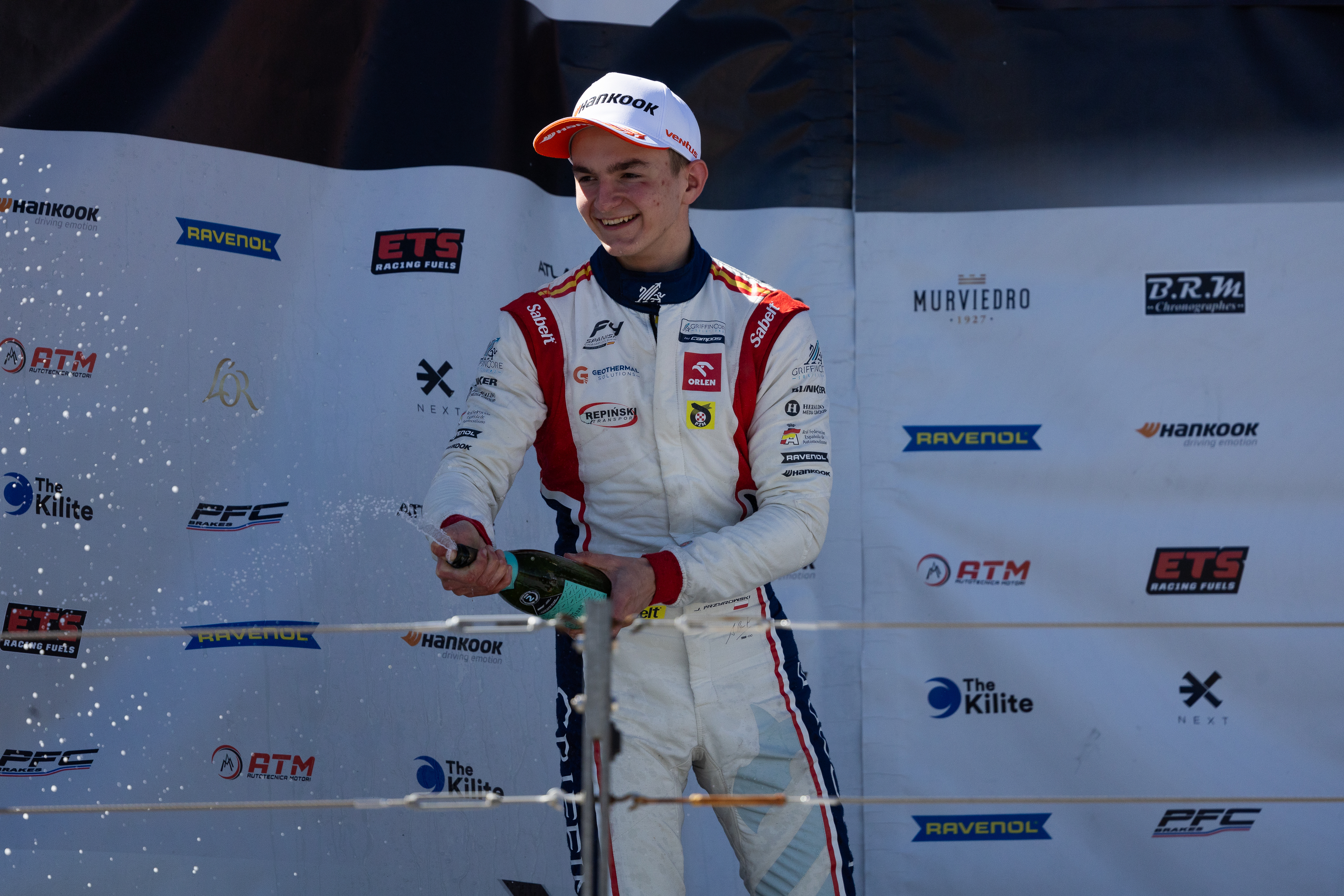
- Przyrowski in 2025
- Nationality: (Poland) Polish
- Born: 31 July 2008 (age 18) Rossoszyca, Poland

Formula Regional European Championship career
- Debut season: 2025
- Current team: RPM
- Car number: 8
- Starts: 21
- Wins: 1
- Podiums: 1
- Poles: 0
- Fastest laps: 2
- Best finish: 12th in 2025

Previous series
- 2026; 2025; 2024–2025; 2024: FR Middle East; Eurocup-4 Winter; F4 Spanish; Formula Winter Series
- Statistics up to date as of 17 September 2026.

Jan Przyrowski (born 31 July 2008) is a Polish racing driver who last competed in the Formula Regional European Championship with RPM.

He previously competed in the 2025 F4 Spanish Championship with Campos Racing, finishing third. He is also the 2025 Formula Winter Series runner-up.

== Career ==
=== Karting ===
Przyrowski began competitive karting in 2015 in Poland, winning the Polish Championship in the Baby ROK class the following year. He entered European karting stage in 2018, finishing 30th in the WSK Champions Cup in the 60 Mini class.

In 2020, Przyrowski finished third in the WSK Euro Series in the 60 Mini class and moved to the OK-Junior class in 2021. He achieved his best results during the 2022 season, winning the WSK Euro Series, and finishing second and third in CIK-FIA European Championship and CIK-FIA World Championship respectively, all in OK-J class. In 2023, Przyrowski advanced to the OK class for his final year in karts.

=== Formula 4 ===
==== 2023 ====
In late 2023, Przyrowski attended the Ferrari Driver Academy scout camp organised by the ACI.

==== 2024 ====
Przyrowski made his single-seater debut in the pre-season Formula Winter Series with Campos Racing, driving during the second and fourth rounds in Valencia and Barcelona respectively.

For his main campaign, Przyrowski would compete in Spanish F4 with Campos.

==== 2025 ====
During pre-season, Przyrowski raced in the Eurocup-4 Spanish winter championship with Campos Racing.

Przyrowski remained with Campos in Spanish F4 for 2025.

=== Formula Regional ===
==== 2025 ====
At the end of 2025, Przyrowski raced in the final round of the Formula Regional European Championship in Monza with RPM.

==== 2026 ====
In the winter, Przyrowski competed in the Formula Regional Middle East Trophy with RPM.

For his main campaign, Przyrowski made a full step up to the Formula Regional European Championship with RPM.

== Karting record ==
=== Karting career summary ===
Season	Series	Team	Position
2015	Polish Championship — Baby ROK	Bambini Racing	18th
2015	ROK Cup Poland — Baby ROK	Bambini Racing	19th
2016	Polish Championship — Baby ROK	Elite Racing Development	1st
2016	Polish Youth Championship — Baby ROK	Automobilklub Leszczyński	1st
2016	ROK Cup Poland — Baby ROK	Elite Racing Development	2nd
2017	Polish Championship — Baby ROK	Elite Racing Development	2nd
2017	Polish Youth Championship — Mini ROK	Automobilklub Leszczyński	10th
2017	ROK Cup Poland — Baby ROK	Elite Racing Development	3rd
2018	WSK Champions Cup — 60 Mini	Elite Racing Development	30th
2018	Polish Youth Championship — Mini ROK	Elite Racing Development	3rd
2018	ROK Cup Poland — Mini ROK	Elite Racing Development	7th
2018	IAME Series Poland — X30 Mini	Elite Racing Development	1st
2018	WSK Final Cup — 60 Mini	Elite Racing Development	50th
2019	WSK Champions Cup — 60 Mini	Elite Racing Development	22nd
2019	WSK Super Master Series — 60 Mini	Elite Racing Development	50th
2019	WSK Euro Series — 60 Mini	Elite Racing Development	25th
2019	Italian Championship — 60 Mini	Elite Racing Development	NC
2019	Polish Youth Championship — Mini ROK	Elite Racing Development	2nd
2019	ROK Cup Poland — Mini ROK	Elite Racing Development	15th
2019	WSK Open Cup — 60 Mini		5th
2019	WSK Final Cup — 60 Mini	AV Racing	15th
2020	WSK Champions Cup — 60 Mini	AV Racing	5th
2020	South Garda Winter Cup — Mini ROK		12th
2020	Andrea Margutti Trophy — 60 Mini		6th
2020	WSK Super Master Series — 60 Mini	AV Racing	8th
2020	WSK Euro Series — 60 Mini	AV Racing	3rd
2020	Italian Championship — Mini Gr.3	AV Racing	4th
2020	WSK Open Cup — 60 Mini		5th
2020	ROK Cup International Final — Mini ROK		1st
2020	WSK Final Cup — 60 Mini	AV Racing	15th
2021	WSK Champions Cup — 60 Mini	AV Racing	5th
2021	South Garda Winter Cup — OK-J		3rd
2021	WSK Super Master Series — 60 Mini	AV Racing	8th
2021	WSK Euro Series — 60 Mini	AV Racing	16th
2021	WSK Euro Series — OK-J	Tony Kart Racing Team	43rd
2021	Champions of the Future — OK-J	Tony Kart Racing Team	22nd
2021	CIK-FIA European Championship — OK-J	Tony Kart Racing Team	15th
2021	CIK-FIA World Championship — OK-J	Tony Kart Racing Team	22nd
2021	WSK Open Cup — OK-J		11th
2022	WSK Super Master Series — OK-J	Tony Kart Racing Team	12th
2022	Polish Championship — OK-J	AMO Racing Team	3rd
2022	ROK Cup Poland — Junior ROK	AMO Racing Team	13th
2022	WSK Euro Series — OK-J	Tony Kart Racing Team	1st
2022	Champions of the Future Winter Series — OK-J	Tony Kart Racing Team	5th
2022	Champions of the Future — OK-J	Tony Kart Racing Team	16th
2022	CIK-FIA European Championship — OK-J	Tony Kart Racing Team	2nd
2022	CIK-FIA World Championship — OK-J	Tony Kart Racing Team	3rd
2022	WSK Open Cup — OK		8th
2022	WSK Final Cup — OK	Tony Kart Racing Team	30th
2023	WSK Super Master Series — OK	Tony Kart Racing Team	14th
2023	Polish Championship — Senior ROK GP	AMO Racing Team	2nd
2023	WSK Euro Series — OK	Tony Kart Racing Team	28th
2023	Champions of the Future — OK	Tony Kart Racing Team	7th
2023	CIK-FIA European Championship — OK	Tony Kart Racing Team	13th
2023	CIK-FIA World Championship — OK	Tony Kart Racing Team	10th
2023	WSK Final Cup — OK	Tony Kart Racing Team	11th

=== Complete CIK-FIA World Championship results ===
Year	Entrant	Class	Circuit	QH	SH	F
2021	Tony Kart Racing Team	OK-J	(Spain) Campillos	33rd	—N/a	22nd
2022	Tony Kart Racing Team	OK-J	(Italy) Sarno	3rd	2nd	3rd
2023	Tony Kart Racing Team	OK	(Italy) Franciacorta	11th	14th	10th

=== Complete CIK-FIA European Championship results ===
(key) (Races in bold indicate pole position; races in italics indicate fastest lap)

Year	Entrant	Class	1	2	3	4	5	6	7	8	9	10	11	12	Pos	Points
2021	Tony Kart Racing Team	OK-J	GEN; QH; 18	GEN; F 23	ESS; QH; 27	ESS; F DNS	SAR; QH; 7	SAR; F 8	ZUE; QH; 7	ZUE; F 15					15th	17
2022	Tony Kart Racing Team	OK-J	POR; QH; 5	POR; SH; 13	POR; F 13	ZUE; QH; 32	ZUE; SH; 26	ZUE; F 24	KRI; QH; 4	KRI; SH; 3	KRI; F 2	FRN; QH; 2	FRN; SH; 2	FRN; F 1	2nd	65
2023	Tony Kart Racing Team	OK	VAL; QH; 7	VAL; SH; 4	VAL; F 2	TRI; QH; 30	TRI; SH; 23	TRI; F 21	RØD; QH; 41	RØD; SH; 37	RØD; F DNQ	CRE; QH; 43	CRE; SH; 31	CRE; F 18	13th	54

== Racing record ==
=== Career summary ===
Season	Series	Team	Races	Wins	Poles	F/Laps	Podiums	Points	Position
2024	Formula Winter Series	Campos Racing	5	0	0	0	0	8	22nd
2024	F4 Spanish Championship	Griffin Core by Campos	21	0	0	3	2	91	10th
2025	Eurocup-4 Spanish Winter Championship	Griffin Core by Campos	9	4	2	2	4	118	**2nd**
2025	F4 Spanish Championship	Griffin Core by Campos	21	3	7	2	10	225	**3rd**
2025	Formula Regional European Championship	RPM	2	0	0	0	0	0	NC†
2026	Formula Regional Middle East Trophy	RPM	11	0	0	0	3	71	6th
2026	Formula Regional European Championship	RPM	19	1	0	2	1	58	12th

* Season still in progress.

=== Complete Formula Winter Series results ===
(key) (Races in bold indicate pole position; races in italics indicate fastest lap)

Year	Team	1	2	3	4	5	6	7	8	9	10	11	12	DC	Points
2024	Campos Racing	JER; 1	JER; 2	JER; 3	CRT; 1; 13	CRT; 2; 14	CRT; 3; 11	ARA; 1	ARA; 2	ARA; 3	CAT; 1 C	CAT; 2; 6	CAT; 3; 21	22nd	8

=== Complete F4 Spanish Championship results ===
(key) (Races in bold indicate pole position; races in italics indicate fastest lap)

Year	Team	1	2	3	4	5	6	7	8	9	10	11	12	13	14	15	16	17	18	19	20	21	DC	Points
2024	Griffin Core by Campos	JAR; 1; 14	JAR; 2; 11	JAR; 3; 3	POR; 1; 7	POR; 2; 8	POR; 3; 5	LEC; 1 Ret	LEC; 2; 8	|LEC; 3; 6	ARA; 1 Ret	ARA; 2; 6	ARA; 3; 4	CRT; 1 Ret	CRT; 2; 27	CRT; 3; 10	JER; 1; 13	JER; 2; 7	JER; 3; 9	CAT; 1; 7	CAT; 2; 3	CAT; 3; 9	10th	91
2025	Griffin Core by Campos	ARA; 1; 23	ARA; 2; 1	ARA; 3; 1	NAV; 1; 1	NAV; 2; 3	NAV; 3; 5	POR; 1 Ret	POR; 2; 29	**POR**; **3**; 2	**LEC**; **1**; 3	**LEC**; **2**; 7	**LEC**; **3** Ret	**JER**; **1** Ret	**JER**; **2**; 13	**JER**; **3**; 6	CRT; 1; 2	CRT; 2; 3	CRT; 3; 4	CAT; 1; 2	CAT; 2; 8	CAT; 3; 3	3rd	225

=== Complete Eurocup-4 Spanish Winter Championship results ===
(key) (Races in bold indicate pole position) (Races in italics indicate fastest lap)

Year	Team	1	2	3	4	5	6	7	8	9	DC	Points
2025	Griffin Core by Campos	**JER**; **1**; 1	JER; 2; 5	**JER**; **3**; 1	POR; 1 Ret	POR; 2; 7	POR; 3; 1	NAV; 1; 1	NAV; 2; 13	NAV; 3 Ret	2nd	116

=== Complete Formula Regional European Championship results ===
(key) (Races in bold indicate pole position) (Races in italics indicate fastest lap)

Year	Team	1	2	3	4	5	6	7	8	9	10	11	12	13	14	15	16	17	18	19	20	DC	Points
2025	RPM	MIS; 1	MIS; 2	SPA; 1	SPA; 2	ZAN; 1	ZAN; 2	HUN; 1	HUN; 2	LEC; 1	LEC; 2	IMO; 1	IMO; 2	RBR; 1	RBR; 2	CAT; 1	CAT; 2	HOC; 1	HOC; 2	MNZ; 1; 12	MNZ; 2; 5	NC†	0
2026	RPM	RBR; 1; 17	RBR; 2; 25	RBR; 3 Ret	ZAN; 1; 21	ZAN; 2; 13	SPA; 1; 20	SPA; 2 C	SPA; 3; 4	MNZ; 1; 7	MNZ; 2; 11	MNZ; 3; 5	HUN; 1; 14	HUN; 2; 11	LEC; 1; 10	LEC; 2; 9	IMO; 1; 23†	IMO; 2; 17	IMO; 3; 15	HOC; 1; 1	HOC; 2; 13	12th	58

^{†} As Przyrowski was a guest driver, he was ineligible to score points.

=== Complete Formula Regional Middle East Trophy results ===
(key) (Races in bold indicate pole position) (Races in italics indicate fastest lap)

Year	Entrant	1	2	3	4	5	6	7	8	9	10	11	12	DC	Points
2026	RPM	YMC1; 1; 14	YMC1; 2; 26	YMC1; 3; 13	YMC2; 1; 11	YMC2; 2; 2	YMC2; 3; 14	DUB; 1; 10	DUB; 2; 3	DUB; 3; 4	LUS; 1; 3	LUS; 2 C	LUS; 3; 5	6th	71
