= Miguel Costa (racing driver) =

Brazilian and American racing driver (born 2009)

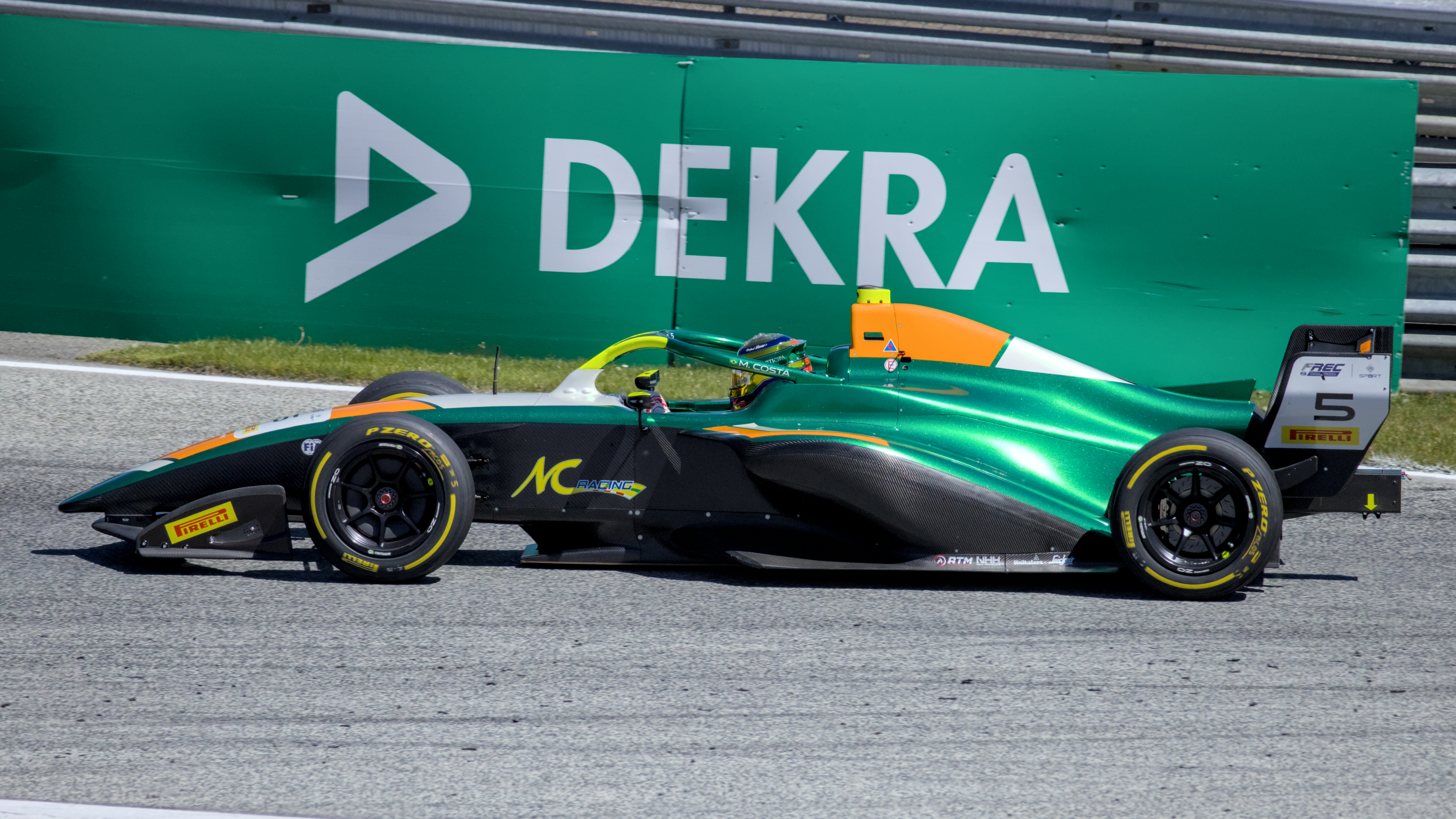
- Costa in 2026
- Nationality: (Brazil) Brazilian (United States) American
- Born: Miguel Ethel Costa; 23 February 2009 (age 17) Miami, Florida, U.S.

Formula Regional European Championship career
- Debut season: 2026
- Current team: LN4 Fusion
- Car number: 5
- Former teams: RPM
- Starts: 19
- Wins: 0
- Podiums: 0
- Poles: 0
- Fastest laps: 0
- Best finish: 23rd in 2026

Previous series
- 2026 2025 2025: FR Middle East; F4 Spanish; Eurocup-4 Spanish Winter

Miguel Ethel Costa (born 23 February 2009) is a Brazilian and American racing driver who is set to compete in the Formula Regional European Championship for LN4 Fusion.

Costa previously raced in the F4 Spanish Championship with Campos Racing.

== Career ==
=== Karting (2013–2024) ===
Costa began competitive karting at the age of four in the USA. Racing in Micro karts at the beginning of his career, Costa finished second in the Florida Winter Tour in the Swift class, as well as finishing second in the Rok Cup USA and SKUSA SuperNationals the same year. Costa then spent the next two years racing full-time in Mini karts, most notably finishing fourth in the 2018 Orlando Cup in Mini Rok and fifth in the 2019 IAME International Final in X30 Mini. During this time frame, Costa made his debut in European karts in late 2018, before primarily racing there the following year as he won the rookie title in the Italian Karting Championship.

In 2020, Costa joined the Sauber Karting Team as he spent most of the year in mini karts, before stepping up to junior karts midway through the year, finishing sixth in the Andrea Margutti Trophy and seventh in the Italian Karting Championship in X30. Switching to OK-J for the following year, Costa had a mostly quiet year, but capped off his first full year in the category by finishing 10th in the Karting World Championship.

After starting 2022 by finishing fourth in the WSK Champions Cup for Fernando Alonso's DPK Racing, returned to the Sauber Karting Team for the rest of the year, most notably finishing second in the WSK Open Cup. During 2022, Costa was also eighth in both the Champions of the Future Winter and Euro Series, as well as finishing fifth in the WSK Final Cup and fourth in the Italian Karting Championship. Costa then spent 2023 in Senior karts as a fully-fledged member of the Sauber Academy, before leaving the stable ahead of 2024 and dabbled between the OK and KZ2 classes in his final year of karting.

=== Formula 4 (2025) ===
Stepping up to single-seaters in 2025, Costa joined Campos Racing to race in the F4 Spanish Championship. Starting off the year in the Eurocup-4 Spanish Winter Championship, Costa took a rookie win and an overall podium in race two at Navarra as he rounded out the winter eighth in points. Racing in the main championship for the rest of the year, Costa scored a best result of fourth in race one at Barcelona to end the year 14th in points.

=== Formula Regional (2026) ===
In 2026, Costa joined RPM for a dual campaign in the Formula Regional Middle East Trophy and the Formula Regional European Championship. In the former, Costa scored his maiden podium in Formula Regional competition in the reverse-grid race of the first Yas Marina round as he ended the winter 15th in points. In his maiden season in the series, Costa achieved a best result of sixth at the Hockenheimring, as he ended the year 23rd overall.

== Karting record ==
=== Karting career summary ===
Season	Series	Team	Position
2017	Florida Winter Tour — Micro Swift		2nd
2017	Florida Winter Tour — Micro Rok		2nd
2017	SKUSA SuperNationals — Micro Swift		2nd
2018	Florida Winter Tour — Mini Rok		6th
2018	SKUSA Winter Series — Mini Swift		6th
2018	United States Pro Kart Series — Mini Swift		9th
2018	Orlando Cup — Mini Rok		4th
2018	SKUSA SuperNationals — Mini Swift	MR Racing	23rd
2018	WSK Final Cup — 60 Mini	AV Racing	128th
2019	Florida Winter Tour — Mini Rok	MC Racing	14th
2019	WSK Super Master Series — 60 Mini	AV Racing	140th
2019	WSK Euro Series — 60 Mini	AV Racing; Team Driver Racing Kart (Note: Costa competed for AV Racing in round 1 and competed for Team Driver Racing Kart in rounds 2–4.)	27th
2019	Italian Karting Championship — 60 Mini	Team Driver Racing Kart	21st
2019	IAME International Final — X30 Mini		5th
2019	WSK Open Cup — 60 Mini	Team Driver Racing Kart	21st
2019	WSK Final Cup — 60 Mini	Team Driver Racing Kart	10th
2019	Rok Cup Superfinal — Mini Rok	Team Driver Racing Kart	16th
2020	SKUSA Winter Series — Mini Swift		7th
2020	WSK Champions Cup — 60 Mini	Sauber Academy	NC
2020	WSK Super Master Series — 60 Mini	Sauber Academy	24th
2020	WSK Euro Series — 60 Mini	Sauber Academy	41st
2020	Rok Cup International Final — Junior Rok	Sauber Academy	19th
2020	Andrea Margutti Trophy — X30 Junior	Sauber Academy	6th
2020	Italian Karting Championship — X30 Junior		7th
2021	WSK Champions Cup — OK-J	Sauber Academy	13th
2021	WSK Super Master Series — OK-J	Sauber Academy	13th
2021	WSK Euro Series — OK-J	Sauber Academy	27th
2021	Champions of the Future — OK-J	Sauber Academy	54th
2021	Karting European Championship — OK-J	Sauber Academy	63rd
2021	WSK Open Cup — OK-J	Sauber Academy	42nd
2021	Karting World Championship — OK-J	Sauber Academy	10th
2021	South Garda Winter Cup — OK-J	Sauber Academy	25th
2021	WSK Final Cup — OK-J	Sauber Academy	18th
2022	WSK Champions Cup — OK-J	DPK Racing	4th
2022	WSK Super Master Series — OK-J	Sauber Academy	11th
2022	Champions of the Future Winter Series — OK-J	Sauber Academy	8th
2022	Champions of the Future Euro Series — OK-J	Sauber Academy	8th
2022	Karting European Championship — OK-J	Sauber Academy	17th
2022	WSK Euro Series — OK-J	Sauber Academy	13th
2022	Italian Karting Championship — OK-J	Sauber Academy	4th
2022	Karting World Championship — OK-J	Sauber Academy	NC
2022	WSK Open Cup — OK-J	Sauber Academy	2nd
2022	WSK Final Cup — OK-J	Sauber Academy	5th
2023	South Garda Winter Cup — OK	DPK Racing	29th
2023	WSK Champions Cup — OK	Sauber Academy	22nd
2023	WSK Super Master Series — OK	Sauber Academy; Parolin Motorsport (Note: Costa competed for Sauber Academy in round 1 and competed for Parolin Motorsport in rounds 2–4.)	19th
2023	Champions of the Future Euro Series — OK	Parolin Motorsport	35th
2023	Karting European Championship — OK	Parolin Motorsport	14th
2023	WSK Euro Series — OK	Parolin Motorsport	17th
2023	Karting World Championship — OK	Parolin Motorsport	20th
2023	WSK Final Cup — OK	Parolin Motorsport	34th
2024	WSK Super Master Series — KZ2	Modena Kart	61st
2024	Champions of the Future Euro Series — OK	Parolin Motorsport; VictoryLane (Note: Costa competed for Parolin Motorsport in rounds 1–4 and competed for VictoryLane in round 5.)	43rd
2024	Karting European Championship — OK	Parolin Motorsport	20th
2024	WSK Open Series — KZ2	Modena Kart	24th
2024	Karting European Championship — KZ2	Modena Kart	26th
2024	Karting World Championship — OK	VictoryLane	11th
2024	Champions of the Future Euro Series — KZ2	Modena Kart	NC
2024	Karting World Cup — KZ2	Modena Kart	16th

== Racing record ==
=== Racing career summary ===
Season	Series	Team	Races	Wins	Poles	F/Laps	Podiums	Points	Position
2025	Eurocup-4 Spanish Winter Championship	Campos Racing	9	0	0	0	1	33	8th
2025	F4 Spanish Championship	Campos Racing	19	0	0	0	0	27	14th
2026	Formula Regional Middle East Trophy	RPM	11	0	0	0	1	27	15th
2026	Formula Regional European Championship	RPM	19	0	0	0	0	12	23rd
2027	Formula Regional European Championship	LN4 Fusion	0	0	0	0	0	0	TBD

* Season still in progress.

=== Complete Eurocup-4 Spanish Winter Championship results ===
(key) (Races in bold indicate pole position) (Races in italics indicate fastest lap)

Year	Team	1	2	3	4	5	6	7	8	9	DC	Points
2025	Campos Racing	JER; 1; 9	JER; 2; 6	JER; 3; 9	POR; 1; 24	POR; 2; 12	POR; 3; 17	NAV; 1 Ret	NAV; 2; 2	NAV; 3; 6	8th	33

=== Complete F4 Spanish Championship results ===
(key) (Races in bold indicate pole position; races in italics indicate fastest lap)

Year	Team	1	2	3	4	5	6	7	8	9	10	11	12	13	14	15	16	17	18	19	20	21	DC	Points
2025	Campos Racing	ARA; 1; 16	ARA; 2; 7	ARA; 3; 9	NAV; 1; 12	NAV; 2; 26	NAV; 3; 20	POR; 1; 18	POR; 2; 12	POR; 3; 9	LEC; 1; 11	LEC; 2; 15	LEC; 3; 27	JER; 1 Ret	JER; 2 DNS	JER; 3 WD	CRT; 1; 10	CRT; 2; 6	CRT; 3; 18	CAT; 1; 4	CAT; 2; 16	CAT; 3; 31†	14th	27

=== Complete Formula Regional Middle East Trophy results ===
(key) (Races in bold indicate pole position) (Races in italics indicate fastest lap)

Year	Entrant	1	2	3	4	5	6	7	8	9	10	11	12	DC	Points
2026	RPM	YMC1; 1; 10	YMC1; 2; 2	YMC1; 3 Ret	YMC2; 1; 16	YMC2; 2; 7	YMC2; 3; 10	DUB; 1; 22	DUB; 2; 15	DUB; 3; 14	LUS; 1; 17	LUS; 2 C	LUS; 3; 10	15th	27

=== Complete Formula Regional European Championship results ===
(key) (Races in bold indicate pole position) (Races in italics indicate fastest lap)

Year	Team	1	2	3	4	5	6	7	8	9	10	11	12	13	14	15	16	17	18	19	20	DC	Points
2026	RPM	RBR; 1; 9	RBR; 2 Ret	RBR; 3; 9	ZAN; 1 Ret	ZAN; 2; 24	SPA; 1; 17	SPA; 2 C	SPA; 3 Ret	MNZ; 1 DSQ	MNZ; 2; 19	MNZ; 3 Ret	HUN; 1; 23	HUN; 2; 14	LEC; 1; 18	LEC; 2; 27	IMO; 1 Ret	IMO; 2; 19	IMO; 3; 16	HOC; 1; 6	HOC; 2; 12	23rd	12
2027	LN4 Fusion	POR; 1	POR; 2	RBR; 1	RBR; 2	SIL; 1	SIL; 2	SPA; 1	SPA; 2	LEC; 1	LEC; 2	HUN; 1	HUN; 2	ZAN; 1	ZAN; 2	IMO; 1	IMO; 2	MNZ; 1	MNZ; 2	CAT; 1	CAT; 2	TBD	TBD
