= 2025 F4 Spanish Championship =

Motor racing season

The 2025 F4 Spanish Championship was the tenth season of the F4 Spanish Championship. It was a multi-event motor racing championship for open wheel, formula racing cars regulated according to FIA Formula 4 regulations, based in Spain.

Following a partnership with the Gedlich Racing-run Formula Winter Series in 2024, the Eurocup-3 and Spanish F4 organisers announced a new breakaway Spanish Winter Championship for each series, to be held across the Iberian Peninsula in the early months of 2025.

== Main series ==
=== Entry list ===
Team	No.	Driver	Class	Rounds
(Netherlands) / MP Motorsport (Note: Cars No. 4, No. 9 and No. 22 entered as MP Motorsport, cars No. 1, No. 10 and No. 11 entered as KCL MP Motorsport.); (Netherlands) / KCL MP Motorsport	1	(United States) Hudson Schwartz		All
(Netherlands) / MP Motorsport; (Netherlands) / KCL MP Motorsport	3	(Netherlands) Rocco Coronel	**R** **G**	7
(Netherlands) / MP Motorsport; (Netherlands) / KCL MP Motorsport	4	(Belgium) Ean Eyckmans	**R**	All
(Netherlands) / MP Motorsport; (Netherlands) / KCL MP Motorsport	9	(Netherlands) René Lammers		All
(Netherlands) / MP Motorsport; (Netherlands) / KCL MP Motorsport	10	(Austria) Niklas Schaufler	**R**	All
(Netherlands) / MP Motorsport; (Netherlands) / KCL MP Motorsport	11	(Netherlands) Reno Francot		All
(Netherlands) / MP Motorsport; (Netherlands) / KCL MP Motorsport	22	(Spain) Juan Cota		All
(Spain) / Campos Racing (Note: Cars No. 2, No. 5 and No. 81 entered as Campos Racing, cars No. 19, No. 23 and No. 99 entered as Griffin Core.); (Spain) / Griffin Core	2	(United States) Vivek Kanthan	**R**	All
(Spain) / Campos Racing; (Spain) / Griffin Core	5	(Brazil) Miguel Costa	**R**	All
(Spain) / Campos Racing; (Spain) / Griffin Core	19	(Slovakia) Matúš Ryba		All
(Spain) / Campos Racing; (Spain) / Griffin Core	23	(Poland) Jan Przyrowski		All
(Spain) / Campos Racing; (Spain) / Griffin Core	81	(Portugal) Noah Monteiro	**R**	All
(Spain) / Campos Racing; (Spain) / Griffin Core	99	(Belgium) Thomas Strauven		All
(Spain) / Tecnicar by Amtog (Note: Cars No. 17 and No. 32 entered as Tecnicar by Amtog, cars No. 6 and No. 77 entered as T-Code by Amtog.); (Spain) / T-Code by Amtog	6	(Netherlands) Sacha van 't Pad Bosch	**R**	1–4
(Spain) / Tecnicar by Amtog; (Spain) / T-Code by Amtog	6	(United Kingdom) Lewis Wherrell	**R**	5
(Spain) / Tecnicar by Amtog; (Spain) / T-Code by Amtog	6	(Spain) Aleix Piñera	**R** **G**	6–7
(Spain) / Tecnicar by Amtog; (Spain) / T-Code by Amtog	17	(Spain) Nacho Tuñón	**R**	All
(Spain) / Tecnicar by Amtog; (Spain) / T-Code by Amtog	32	(Poland) Wiktor Dobrzański		All
(Spain) / Tecnicar by Amtog; (Spain) / T-Code by Amtog	77	(Serbia) Andrej Petrović		All
(France) Saintéloc Racing	8	(Greece) Philippe Armand Karras (Note: Jean-Paul and Philippe Armand Karras are French-Greek drivers competing under a Greek licence.)	**R**	1
(France) Saintéloc Racing	14	(Greece) Jean-Paul Karras	**R**	1
(France) Saintéloc Racing	80	(United States) Alex Powell (Note: Powell is a Jamaican-American driver competing under an American licence.)		1
(Switzerland) G4 Racing	12	(Greece) Philippe Armand Karras	**R** **G**	5–7
(Switzerland) G4 Racing	13	(Greece) Jean-Paul Karras	**R** **G**	5–7
(Spain) / Drivex (Note: Cars No. 33, No. 37 and No. 48 entered as Drivex, cars No. 15, No. 41 and No. 57 entered as DXR.); (Spain) / DXR	15	(Spain) Edu Robinson		1
(Spain) / Drivex; (Spain) / DXR	15	(Brazil) Ricardo Baptista	**R**	4, 6
(Spain) / Drivex; (Spain) / DXR	15	(Brazil) Rafaela Ferreira	**F**	5, 7
(Spain) / Drivex; (Spain) / DXR	33	(Kyrgyzstan) Kirill Kutskov	**G**	7
(Spain) / Drivex; (Spain) / DXR	33	(Lebanon) Christopher El Feghali	**R**	1–6
(Spain) / Drivex; (Spain) / DXR	48	(Lebanon) Christopher El Feghali	**R**	7
(Spain) / Drivex; (Spain) / DXR	48	(Argentina) Gino Trappa		1–6
(Spain) / Drivex; (Spain) / DXR	37	(Brazil) Filippo Fiorentino		All
(Spain) / Drivex; (Spain) / DXR	41	(Sweden) Stepan Suslov (Note: Suslov is Russian, but he competes under a Swedish licence as Russian national emblems were banned by the FIA following the Russian invasion of Ukraine.)	**R**	All
(Spain) / Drivex; (Spain) / DXR	57	(Kyrgyzstan) Artem Severiukhin		1
(Spain) / Drivex; (Spain) / DXR	57	(United Arab Emirates) Kaiden Higgins	**R**	2–7
(New Zealand) Rodin Motorsport	24	(South Korea) Kyuho Lee	**R**	1–6
(New Zealand) Rodin Motorsport	46	(United Kingdom) Nathan Tye		All
(New Zealand) Rodin Motorsport	55	(Austria) Emma Felbermayr	**R** **F**	1, 3–7
(Spain) Monlau Motorsport	25	(Argentina) Francisco Monarca	**R**	1–4
(Spain) Monlau Motorsport	25	(Spain) Miquel Blascos	**R**	5–7
(Spain) Monlau Motorsport	27	(Brazil) Alexander Jacoby		All
(Spain) Monlau Motorsport	62	(United States) Andre Rodriguez	**R** **G**	3
(Spain) Monlau Motorsport	91	(Angola) Lorenzo Campos	**R**	1–6
(Spain) Monlau Motorsport	91	(Argentina) Santiago Baztarrica		7
(Spain) TC Racing	88	(Argentina) Santiago Baztarrica		1–4
(Spain) TC Racing	88	(Brazil) Rogerio Grotta		5–7
(Spain) TC Racing	39	(Argentina) Santino Panetta	**R**	All
(Spain) TC Racing	78	(Italy) Alfio Spina		All
(Spain) GRS Team	70	(Slovenia) Aleksandar Bogunović	**R**	All
(Spain) GRS Team	71	(Armenia) Daniel Dallakyan	**R**	1–5
(Spain) GRS Team	71	(Belgium) Yani Stevenheydens	**G**	6
(Spain) GRS Team	71	(France) Pablo Riccobono Bello	**R** **G**	7

Icon	Legend
**R**	Rookie
**F**	Female Trophy
**G**	Guest drivers ineligible to score points

- Yani Stevenheydens was scheduled to race for MP Motorsport before switching to the Eurocup-3.
- Aiva Anagnostiadis and Plamen Balchev were scheduled to compete for Cram Motorsport, but neither the team nor the drivers appeared in any rounds.
- Christian Garduño was scheduled to compete for Saintéloc Racing, but did not enter any rounds.

=== Race calendar and results ===
The calendar was announced on 18 November 2024.

Round		Circuit	Date	Pole position	Fastest lap	Winning driver	Winning team	Rookie winner	Supporting
1	R1	(Spain) MotorLand Aragón, Alcañiz	29 March	(Portugal) Noah Monteiro	(Belgium) Thomas Strauven	(Belgium) Thomas Strauven	(Spain) Griffin Core	(United States) Vivek Kanthan	Eurocup-3 SWC; TCR Spain Touring Car Championship; Campeonato de España de GT
1	R2	(Spain) MotorLand Aragón, Alcañiz	30 March	(Belgium) Thomas Strauven	(Belgium) Thomas Strauven	(Poland) Jan Przyrowski (Note: Lammers finished first on the track but was given a five-seconds penalty for exceeding track limits. Przyrowski inherited the win.)	(Spain) Griffin Core	(Belgium) Ean Eyckmans	Eurocup-3 SWC; TCR Spain Touring Car Championship; Campeonato de España de GT
1	R3	(Spain) MotorLand Aragón, Alcañiz	30 March	(Belgium) Thomas Strauven	(Belgium) Thomas Strauven	(Poland) Jan Przyrowski (Note: Lammers and Strauven finished first and second on the track but both were given a five-second penalty for keeping at racing speed out of the track and for forcing Lammers outside the track respectively. Przyrowski inherited the win.)	(Spain) Griffin Core	(Austria) Niklas Schaufler	Eurocup-3 SWC; TCR Spain Touring Car Championship; Campeonato de España de GT
2	R1	(Spain) Circuito de Navarra, Los Arcos	3 May	(Belgium) Thomas Strauven	(Belgium) Thomas Strauven	(Poland) Jan Przyrowski (Note: Lammers finished first on the track but was given a one-place penalty for leaving the track and gaining an advantage. Przyrowski inherited the win.)	(Spain) Griffin Core	(Portugal) Noah Monteiro	Campeonato de España de GT
2	R2	(Spain) Circuito de Navarra, Los Arcos	4 May	(Belgium) Thomas Strauven	(Netherlands) René Lammers	(Netherlands) René Lammers	(Netherlands) MP Motorsport	(Portugal) Noah Monteiro	Campeonato de España de GT
2	R3	(Spain) Circuito de Navarra, Los Arcos	4 May	(Spain) Juan Cota	(Belgium) Thomas Strauven	(Netherlands) René Lammers	(Netherlands) MP Motorsport	(Belgium) Ean Eyckmans	Campeonato de España de GT
3	R1	(Portugal) Algarve International Circuit, Portimão	7 June	(Belgium) Thomas Strauven	(Poland) Jan Przyrowski (Note: Jan Przyrowski set the fastest lap but was not classified in the race, so he was ineligible to score the point for it. Thomas Strauven scored the point for setting the fastest lap among those classified in the race.)	(Belgium) Thomas Strauven	(Spain) Griffin Core	(Belgium) Ean Eyckmans	Eurocup-3; Campeonato de España de GT
3	R2	(Portugal) Algarve International Circuit, Portimão	8 June	(Belgium) Thomas Strauven	(Belgium) Thomas Strauven	(Belgium) Thomas Strauven	(Spain) Griffin Core	(Belgium) Ean Eyckmans	Eurocup-3; Campeonato de España de GT
3	R3	(Portugal) Algarve International Circuit, Portimão	8 June	(Poland) Jan Przyrowski	(Belgium) Thomas Strauven	(Belgium) Thomas Strauven	(Spain) Griffin Core	(Belgium) Ean Eyckmans	Eurocup-3; Campeonato de España de GT
4	R1	(France) Circuit Paul Ricard, Le Castellet	21 June	(Poland) Jan Przyrowski	(Belgium) Thomas Strauven	(Belgium) Thomas Strauven	(Spain) Griffin Core	(Belgium) Ean Eyckmans	Eurocup-3; Challenge Endurance VHC V de V
4	R2	(France) Circuit Paul Ricard, Le Castellet	22 June	(Poland) Jan Przyrowski	(United Kingdom) Nathan Tye	(United Kingdom) Nathan Tye	(New Zealand) Rodin Motorsport	(Belgium) Ean Eyckmans	Eurocup-3; Challenge Endurance VHC V de V
4	R3	(France) Circuit Paul Ricard, Le Castellet	22 June	(Poland) Jan Przyrowski	(Belgium) Thomas Strauven	(Belgium) Thomas Strauven	(Spain) Griffin Core	(Belgium) Ean Eyckmans	Eurocup-3; Challenge Endurance VHC V de V
5	R1	(Spain) Circuito de Jerez, Jerez de la Frontera	20 September	(Poland) Jan Przyrowski	(Belgium) Ean Eyckmans	(Belgium) Ean Eyckmans	(Netherlands) MP Motorsport	(Belgium) Ean Eyckmans	Eurocup-3
5	R2	(Spain) Circuito de Jerez, Jerez de la Frontera	21 September	(Poland) Jan Przyrowski	(Spain) Juan Cota	(Netherlands) René Lammers	(Netherlands) MP Motorsport	(Austria) Niklas Schaufler	Eurocup-3
5	R3	(Spain) Circuito de Jerez, Jerez de la Frontera	21 September	(Poland) Jan Przyrowski	(Poland) Jan Przyrowski	(Belgium) Thomas Strauven	(Spain) Griffin Core	(Portugal) Noah Monteiro	Eurocup-3
6	R1	(Spain) Circuit Ricardo Tormo, Cheste	18 October	(Belgium) Thomas Strauven	(Belgium) Thomas Strauven	(Belgium) Thomas Strauven	(Spain) Griffin Core	(Belgium) Ean Eyckmans	TCR Spain Touring Car Championship; Campeonato de España de GT
6	R2	(Spain) Circuit Ricardo Tormo, Cheste	19 October	(Belgium) Thomas Strauven	(Belgium) Thomas Strauven	(Belgium) Thomas Strauven	(Spain) Griffin Core	(Belgium) Ean Eyckmans	TCR Spain Touring Car Championship; Campeonato de España de GT
6	R3	(Spain) Circuit Ricardo Tormo, Cheste	19 October	(Belgium) Thomas Strauven	(Lebanon) Christopher El Feghali	(Netherlands) René Lammers	(Netherlands) MP Motorsport	(Belgium) Ean Eyckmans	TCR Spain Touring Car Championship; Campeonato de España de GT
7	R1	(Spain) Circuit de Barcelona-Catalunya, Montmeló	15 November	(Belgium) Thomas Strauven (Note: The qualifying session was not held due to the technical problems with the track limit system. The grid order for race 1 was based on the results of the free practice. The bonus points were not awarded. The grid order for race 2 was based on the fastest lap classification in race 1.)	(Netherlands) Reno Francot	(Belgium) Thomas Strauven	(Spain) Griffin Core	(Belgium) Ean Eyckmans	Eurocup-3; TCR Spain Touring Car Championship; Campeonato de España de GT
7	R2	(Spain) Circuit de Barcelona-Catalunya, Montmeló	16 November	(Netherlands) Reno Francot	(Netherlands) Reno Francot	(Netherlands) Reno Francot	(Netherlands) KCL MP Motorsport	(United States) Vivek Kanthan	Eurocup-3; TCR Spain Touring Car Championship; Campeonato de España de GT
7	R3	(Spain) Circuit de Barcelona-Catalunya, Montmeló	16 November	(Italy) Alfio Spina	(Netherlands) Reno Francot	(Belgium) Ean Eyckmans	(Netherlands) MP Motorsport	(Belgium) Ean Eyckmans	Eurocup-3; TCR Spain Touring Car Championship; Campeonato de España de GT

=== Championship standings ===
Points are awarded to the top ten classified finishers in 30-minute races and for the top nine classified finishers in 25-minute races.

Races	Position, points per race											
Races	**1st**	**2nd**	**3rd**	**4th**	**5th**	**6th**	**7th**	**8th**	**9th**	**10th**	**Pole**	**FL**
30-minute races	25	18	15	12	10	8	6	4	2	1	2	1
25-minute races	18	15	12	10	8	6	4	2	1			1

==== Drivers' championship ====
Pos	Driver	ARA (Spain)			NAV (Spain)			POR (Portugal)			LEC (France)			JER (Spain)			CRT (Spain)			CAT (Spain)			Pts
Pos	Driver	R1	R2	R3	R1	R2	R3	R1	R2	R3	R1	R2	R3	R1	R2	R3	R1	R2	R3	R1	R2	R3	Pts
1	(Belgium) Thomas Strauven	1	**34**	**3**	**3**	**2**	2	**1**	**1**	1	1	3	1	2	9	1	**1**	**1**	**2**	**1**	5	4	392
2	(Belgium) Ean Eyckmans	12	2	14	11	28†	3	2	2	4	2	2	2	1	Ret	5	3	4	6	3	17	1	235
3	(Poland) Jan Przyrowski	23	1	1	1	3	5	Ret	29	**2**	**3**	**7**	**Ret**	**Ret**	**13**	**6**	2	3	4	2	8	3	225
4	(Netherlands) René Lammers	2	6	2	2	1	1	Ret	11	6	5	4	15	20	1	2	4	2	1	29	31†	12	221
5	(Netherlands) Reno Francot	13	8	17	4	4	6	3	20	30†	7	8	3	4	29	11	5	5	3	34	**1**	2	154
6	(Spain) Juan Cota	6	15	8	5	5	**12**	Ret	8	3	15	5	6	3	2	3	16	20	11	9	21	5	125
7	(United Kingdom) Nathan Tye	4	9	11	7	25	Ret	19	5	7	4	1	5	8	3	7	9	Ret	9	6	11	8	114
8	(Portugal) Noah Monteiro	**20**	4	6	8	6	Ret	7	10	5	10	Ret	4	5	10	4	8	9	10	5	12	Ret	97
9	(United States) Vivek Kanthan	5	5	28†	14	7	8	6	Ret	10	13	6	7	Ret	8	8	6	8	17	19	2	7	86
10	(Austria) Niklas Schaufler	9	32	4	13	21	9	8	4	8	14	9	8	6	4	Ret	28	7	8	20	4	9	81
11	(United States) Hudson Schwartz	3	3	27	9	8	7	11	28	18	8	14	10	29†	5	13	11	22	7	7	19	15	62
12	(Serbia) Andrej Petrović	8	11	5	16	11	4	4	7	11	9	13	31	12	11	Ret	22	21	5	31	7	19	60
13	(Lebanon) Christopher El Feghali	15	18	7	10	9	24†	5	3	Ret	6	10	26	7	6	22	14	Ret	31	12	9	27	53
14	(Brazil) Miguel Costa	16	7	9	12	26	20	18	12	9	11	15	27	Ret	DNS	WD	10	6	18	4	16	31†	27
15	(Slovakia) Matúš Ryba	21	19	12	6	15	Ret	9	30	17	16	11	20	Ret	16	14	15	23	13	17	6	17	18
16	(Argentina) Gino Trappa (Note: Trappa was DQ for technical reasons after R1 in Algarve but Drivex has the intention to appeal. For the moment, results remain the same pending appeal.)	19	20	10	Ret	12	14	10	9	28	18	Ret	28	9	7	9	17	11	20				11
17	(Italy) Alfio Spina	32	12	15	17	10	Ret	27	6	32†	12	28	9	16	15	12	13	Ret	25	18	14	**18**	10
18	(Argentina) Santino Panetta	11	13	13	Ret	14	13	12	Ret	27	Ret	12	11	Ret	24	25	7	10	24	33†	10	11	9
19	(Argentina) Francisco Monarca	7	14	Ret	22	Ret	22	15	14	13	19	25	18										6
20	(Brazil) Filippo Fiorentino	29	17	23	15	13	21	28†	13	12	24	30	13	10	17	30†	24	15	27	10	Ret	21	3
21	(United Arab Emirates) Kaiden Higgins				24	22	18	25	27	24	27	19	22	11	14	10	25	27	35†	14	29	16	1
22	(South Korea) Kyuho Lee	24	27	18	25	23	10	14	31	21	Ret	22	12	19	23	29	Ret	30†	21				1
23	(Argentina) Santiago Baztarrica	10	16	Ret	27	18	19	22	22	25	22	20	23							30	22	29	1
24	(Spain) Miquel Blascos													13	12	31†	19	13	23	11	26	26	1
25	(Netherlands) Sacha van 't Pad Bosch	Ret	10	Ret	19	20	11	20	16	16	17	16	16										0
26	(Spain) Nacho Tuñón	17	35	21	18	27	Ret	16	17	19	29	18	17	27	25	16	12	12	16	32	15	22	0
27	(Angola) Lorenzo Campos	26	21	Ret	28†	Ret	16	13	15	14	28	17	30	15	19	21	31	19	14				0
28	(Sweden) Stepan Suslov	18	26	16	26	17	Ret	29†	21	26	21	21	29	18	20	15	23	18	34†	23	23	13	0
29	(Austria) Emma Felbermayr	25	31	22				21	18	15	20	26	19	23	31	17	20	Ret	19	13	Ret	30	0
30	(Brazil) Alexander Jacoby	33	24	25	Ret	16	15	17	25	31†	Ret	24	14	21	18	19	Ret	14	32	26	30	25	0
31	(Slovenia) Aleksandar Bogunović	22	22	24	23	19	23†	24	19	22	25	23	21	14	21	23	Ret	28†	26	24	Ret	14	0
32	(Spain) Edu Robinson	14	25	Ret																			0
33	(Brazil) Rogerio Grotta													26	30	24	26	25	22	15	28	28	0
34	(Poland) Wiktor Dobrzański	27	23	19	20	24	17	23	24	23	30	27	24	24	26	27	27	Ret	30	27	27	23	0
35	(Armenia) Daniel Dallakyan	34	30	20	21	Ret	Ret	26	23	20	23	Ret	32†	DNA	DNA	DNA							0
36	(United Kingdom) Lewis Wherrell													25	28	26							0
37	(Brazil) Ricardo Baptista										26	29	25				30	29†	33				0
38	(Kyrgyzstan) Artem Severiukhin	30	33	26																			0
39	(Brazil) Rafaela Ferreira													28	27	28				WD	WD	WD	0
40	(Greece) Jean-Paul Karras (Note: G4 Racing and its drivers were entered in the championship from round 5 as wild card entries and were therefore ineligible to score points.)	28	29	WD										22	32	18	18	16	12	28	20	6	0
41	(Greece) Philippe Armand Karras	31	28	WD										17	22	20	21	26	29	8	18	Ret	0
42	(United States) Alex Powell	35†	WD	WD																			0
Guest drivers ineligible to score points
–	(Netherlands) Rocco Coronel																			22	3	10	–
–	(Kyrgyzstan) Kirill Kutskov																			21	13	32†	–
–	(Belgium) Yani Stevenheydens																Ret	17	15				–
–	(France) Pablo Riccobono Bello																			16	25	24	–
–	(Spain) Aleix Piñera																29	24	28	25	24	20	–
–	(United States) Andre Rodriguez							Ret	26	29†													–
Pos	Driver	R1	R2	R3	R1	R2	R3	R1	R2	R3	R1	R2	R3	R1	R2	R3	R1	R2	R3	R1	R2	R3	Pts
Pos	Driver	ARA (Spain)			NAV (Spain)			POR (Portugal)			LEC (France)			JER (Spain)			CRT (Spain)			CAT (Spain)			Pts

Colour	Result
Gold	Winner
Silver	Second place
Bronze	Third place
Green	Points classification
Blue	Non-points classification
Blue	Non-classified finish (NC)
Purple	Retired, not classified (Ret)
Red	Did not qualify (DNQ)
Red	Did not pre-qualify (DNPQ)
Black	Disqualified (DSQ)
White	Did not start (DNS)
White	Withdrew (WD)
White	Race cancelled (C)
Blank	Did not practice (DNP)
Blank	Did not arrive (DNA)
Blank	Excluded (EX)

**Bold** – Pole
Italics – Fastest Lap
† — Did not finish but classified
Rookie

==== Teams' standings ====
For round one, each team's best two drivers in the opening race scored points for the event. For the following races, two drivers per round are nominated by the team to score points. Bonus points for fastest laps are awarded if applicable.

Pos	Driver	ARA (Spain)			NAV (Spain)			POR (Portugal)			LEC (France)			JER (Spain)			CRT (Spain)			CAT (Spain)			Pts
Pos	Driver	R1	R2	R3	R1	R2	R3	R1	R2	R3	R1	R2	R3	R1	R2	R3	R1	R2	R3	R1	R2	R3	Pts
1	(Spain) Griffin Core by Campos	1	19	3	1	2	2	1	1	1	1	3	1	2	9	1	1	1	2	1	5	3	470
1	(Spain) Griffin Core by Campos	21	34	12	3	3	5	Ret	29	2	3	7	Ret	Ret	13	6	2	3	4	2	8	4	470
2	(Netherlands) MP Motorsport	2	6	2	2	1	1	Ret	8	3	2	2	2	1	1	2	3	2	1	3	17	1	384
2	(Netherlands) MP Motorsport	6	15	8	11	28†	3	Ret	11	6	5	4	15	20	Ret	5	4	4	6	29	31†	12	384
3	(Netherlands) KCL by MP	3	3	4	9	8	7	3	20	18	7	8	3	4	5	11	5	5	3	20	1	2	157
3	(Netherlands) KCL by MP	9	32	27	13	21	9	11	28	30†	8	14	10	29	29	13	28	7	8	34	4	9	157
4	(Spain) Campos Racing	5	5	9	8	6	8	6	10	5	10	6	4	5	8	4	6	8	10	5	2	7	136
4	(Spain) Campos Racing	16	7	28†	14	7	Ret	7	Ret	10	13	Ret	7	Ret	10	8	8	9	17	19	12	Ret	136
5	(New Zealand) Rodin Motorsport	4	9	11	7	7	25	14	5	7	4	1	5	8	3	7	9	30	9	6	11	8	101
5	(New Zealand) Rodin Motorsport	24	27	18	11	25	Ret	19	31	21	Ret	22	12	19	23	29	Ret	Ret	21	13	Ret	30	101
6	(Spain) Drivex	15	18	7	10	9	14	5	3	28	6	10	26	7	6	9	14	11	20	10	9	21	61
6	(Spain) Drivex	19	20	10	Ret	12	24†	10 (Note: Trappa was DQ for technical reasons after R1 but Drivex has the intention to appeal. For the moment, results remain the same pending appeal)	9	Ret	18	Ret	28	9	7	22	17	Ret	31	12	Ret	27	61
7	(Spain) T-Code by Amtog	8	10	5	16	11	4	4	7	11	9	13	16	12	11	26	22	21	5	31	7	19	54
7	(Spain) T-Code by Amtog	Ret	11	Ret	19	20	11	20	16	16	17	16	31	25	28	Ret							54
8	(Spain) TC Racing	10	13	13	17	10	Ret	22	6	25	12	20	9	16	15	12	7	10	24	18	10	11	15
8	(Spain) TC Racing	11	16	Ret	Ret	14	13	27	22	32†	22	28	23	Ret	24	25	13	Ret	25	33†	14	18	15
9	(Spain) Monlau Motorsport	7	14	Ret	22	Ret	16	15	14	13	19	17	18	15	18	19	19	13	14	11	22	26	6
9	(Spain) Monlau Motorsport	26	21	Ret	28†	Ret	22	17	25	31†	28	25	30	21	19	21	31	19	23	30	26	29	6
10	(Spain) DX Racing Team	14	25	16	24	17	18	29†	21	26	21	19	22	11	14	10	23	18	34	14	23	13	1
10	(Spain) DX Racing Team	18	26	Ret	26	22	Ret	25	27	24	27	21	29	18	20	15	25	27	35	23	19	16	1
11	(Spain) Tecnicar by Amtog	17	23	19	18	24	17	16	17	19	29	18	17	24	25	16	12	12	16	27	15	22	0
11	(Spain) Tecnicar by Amtog	27	35	21	20	27	Ret	23	24	23	30	27	24	27	26	27	27	Ret	30	32	27	23	0
12	(Spain) GRS Team	22	22	20	21	19	23†	24	19	20	23	23	21	14	21	23	Ret	28	26	24	Ret	14	0
12	(Spain) GRS Team	34	30	24	23	Ret	Ret	26	23	22	25	Ret	32†										0
13	(France) Saintéloc Racing	28	28	WD																			0
13	(France) Saintéloc Racing	31	29	WD																			0
Pos	Team	R1	R2	R3	R1	R2	R3	R1	R2	R3	R1	R2	R3	R1	R2	R3	R1	R2	R3	R1	R2	R3	Pts
Pos	Team	ARA (Spain)			NAV (Spain)			POR (Portugal)			LEC (France)			JER (Spain)			CRT (Spain)			CAT (Spain)			Pts

== Winter series ==
=== Entry list ===
Team	No.	Driver	Class	Rounds
(Netherlands) / MP Motorsport (Note: Cars No. 1, No. 9 and No. 22 entered as MP Motorsport, cars No. 4, No. 10 and No. 11 entered as KCL by MP Motorsport.); (Netherlands) / KCL by MP Motorsport	1	(United States) Hudson Schwartz		All
(Netherlands) / MP Motorsport; (Netherlands) / KCL by MP Motorsport	4	(Belgium) Ean Eyckmans	**R**	All
(Netherlands) / MP Motorsport; (Netherlands) / KCL by MP Motorsport	9	(Netherlands) René Lammers		All
(Netherlands) / MP Motorsport; (Netherlands) / KCL by MP Motorsport	10	(Austria) Niklas Schaufler	**R**	All
(Netherlands) / MP Motorsport; (Netherlands) / KCL by MP Motorsport	11	(Netherlands) Reno Francot		2–3
(Netherlands) / MP Motorsport; (Netherlands) / KCL by MP Motorsport	22	(Belgium) Yani Stevenheydens		All
(Spain) / Campos Racing (Note: Cars No. 2, No. 5 and No. 81 entered as Campos Racing, cars No. 19, No. 23 and No. 99 entered as Griffin Core by Campos.); (Spain) / Griffin Core by Campos	2	(United States) Vivek Kanthan	**R**	All
(Spain) / Campos Racing; (Spain) / Griffin Core by Campos	5	(Brazil) Miguel Costa	**R**	All
(Spain) / Campos Racing; (Spain) / Griffin Core by Campos	19	(Slovakia) Matúš Ryba		All
(Spain) / Campos Racing; (Spain) / Griffin Core by Campos	23	(Poland) Jan Przyrowski		All
(Spain) / Campos Racing; (Spain) / Griffin Core by Campos	81	(Portugal) Noah Monteiro	**R**	All
(Spain) / Campos Racing; (Spain) / Griffin Core by Campos	99	(Belgium) Thomas Strauven		All
(Spain) / Tecnicar by Amtog (Note: Cars No. 17 and No. 32 entered as Tecnicar by Amtog at all rounds. Cars No. 6 and No. 77 entered as Tecnicar by Amtog at rounds 1 and 2 and T-Code at round 3.); (Spain) / T-Code	6	(Netherlands) Sacha van 't Pad Bosch	**R**	All
(Spain) / Tecnicar by Amtog; (Spain) / T-Code	17	(Spain) Nacho Tuñón	**R**	2–3
(Spain) / Tecnicar by Amtog; (Spain) / T-Code	32	(Poland) Wiktor Dobrzański		All
(Spain) / Tecnicar by Amtog; (Spain) / T-Code	77	(Serbia) Andrej Petrović		All
(France) ART Grand Prix	7	(United States) Courtney Crone	**F**	1
(France) ART Grand Prix	26	(Brazil) Aurelia Nobels	**F**	1–2
(France) ART Grand Prix	57	(United States) Lia Block	**F**	1–2
(France) Saintéloc Racing	8	(Greece) Philippe Armand Karras	**R**	All
(France) Saintéloc Racing	14	(Greece) Jean-Paul Karras	**R**	All
(France) Saintéloc Racing	16	(Mexico) Christian Garduño	**R**	All
(New Zealand) Rodin Motorsport	24	(South Korea) Kyuho Lee	**R**	All
(New Zealand) Rodin Motorsport	46	(United Kingdom) Nathan Tye		All
(New Zealand) Rodin Motorsport	55	(Austria) Emma Felbermayr	**R** **F**	1–2
(Spain) Monlau Motorsport	25	(Argentina) Francisco Monarca	**R**	All
(Spain) Monlau Motorsport	27	(Brazil) Alexander Jacoby (Note: Jacoby is an American-Brazilian driver competing under a Brazilian licence.)		All
(Spain) Monlau Motorsport	91	(Angola) Lorenzo Campos	**R**	All
(Spain) / Drivex (Note: Cars No. 33, No. 37 and No. 48 entered as Drivex, cars No. 41 entered as DXR by Drivex.); (Spain) / DXR by Drivex	33	(Lebanon) Christopher El Feghali	**R**	All
(Spain) / Drivex; (Spain) / DXR by Drivex	37	(Brazil) Filippo Fiorentino		All
(Spain) / Drivex; (Spain) / DXR by Drivex	41	(Sweden) Stepan Suslov	**R**	All
(Spain) / Drivex; (Spain) / DXR by Drivex	48	(Argentina) Gino Trappa		All
(Italy) Cram Motorsport	35	(Australia) Aiva Anagnostiadis	**F**	1–2
(Italy) Cram Motorsport	36	(Slovenia) Aleksandar Bogunović	**R**	2
(Spain) TC Racing	39	(Argentina) Santino Panetta	**R**	All
(Spain) TC Racing	78	(Italy) Alfio Spina		All
(Spain) TC Racing	88	(Argentina) Santiago Baztarrica		All
(Spain) GRS Team	72	(Slovenia) Aleksandar Bogunović	**R**	3

Icon	Legend
**R**	Rookie
**F**	Female Trophy
**G**	Guest drivers ineligible to score points

=== Race calendar and results ===
Round		Circuit	Date	Pole position	Fastest lap	Winning driver	Winning team	Rookie winner	Supporting
1	R1	(Spain) Circuito de Jerez, Jerez de la Frontera	8 February	(Poland) Jan Przyrowski	(Belgium) Thomas Strauven	(Poland) Jan Przyrowski	(Spain) Griffin Core by Campos	(Lebanon) Christopher El Feghali	Eurocup-3 SWC
1	SR	(Spain) Circuito de Jerez, Jerez de la Frontera	8 February		(Netherlands) René Lammers	(Netherlands) René Lammers	(Netherlands) MP Motorsport	(United States) Vivek Kanthan	Eurocup-3 SWC
1	R2	(Spain) Circuito de Jerez, Jerez de la Frontera	9 February	(Poland) Jan Przyrowski	(Poland) Jan Przyrowski	(Poland) Jan Przyrowski	(Spain) Griffin Core by Campos	(United States) Vivek Kanthan	Eurocup-3 SWC
2	R1	(Portugal) Algarve International Circuit, Portimão	22 February	(Belgium) Thomas Strauven	(Belgium) Thomas Strauven	(Belgium) Thomas Strauven	(Spain) Griffin Core by Campos	(Belgium) Ean Eyckmans	Eurocup-3 SWC
2	SR	(Portugal) Algarve International Circuit, Portimão	22 February		(Belgium) Thomas Strauven	(Belgium) Thomas Strauven	(Spain) Griffin Core by Campos	(United States) Vivek Kanthan	Eurocup-3 SWC
2	R2	(Portugal) Algarve International Circuit, Portimão	23 February	(Belgium) Thomas Strauven	(Poland) Jan Przyrowski	(Poland) Jan Przyrowski	(Spain) Griffin Core by Campos	(United States) Vivek Kanthan	Eurocup-3 SWC
3	R1	(Spain) Circuito de Navarra, Los Arcos	8 March	(Belgium) Thomas Strauven	(Austria) Niklas Schaufler	(Poland) Jan Przyrowski	(Spain) Griffin Core by Campos	(Belgium) Ean Eyckmans	Campeonato de España de Resistencia
3	SR	(Spain) Circuito de Navarra, Los Arcos	8 March		(Belgium) Yani Stevenheydens	(Belgium) Yani Stevenheydens	(Netherlands) MP Motorsport	(Brazil) Miguel Costa	Campeonato de España de Resistencia
3	R2	(Spain) Circuito de Navarra, Los Arcos	9 March	(Belgium) Ean Eyckmans	(Belgium) Thomas Strauven	(Serbia) Andrej Petrović	(Spain) T-Code	(Belgium) Ean Eyckmans	Campeonato de España de Resistencia

=== Championship standings ===
Points were awarded to the top ten classified finishers in 30-minute races and for the top nine classified finishers in 20-minute sprint races.

Races	Position, points per race											
Races	**1st**	**2nd**	**3rd**	**4th**	**5th**	**6th**	**7th**	**8th**	**9th**	**10th**	**Pole**	**FL**
Race 1 & 2	25	18	15	12	10	8	6	4	2	1	2	1
Sprint Race	18	15	12	10	8	6	4	2	1			1

==== Drivers' championship ====
Pos	Driver	JER (Spain)			POR (Portugal)			NAV (Spain)			Pts
Pos	Driver	R1	SR	R2	R1	SR	R2	R1	SR	R2	Pts
1	(Belgium) Thomas Strauven	2	28	4	**1**	1	**2**	**2**	3	4	143
2	(Poland) Jan Przyrowski	**1**	5	**1**	Ret	7	1	1	13	Ret	118
3	(Netherlands) René Lammers	7	1	3	12	6	8	5	9	3	76
4	(United Kingdom) Nathan Tye	4	3	5	Ret	13	4	7	7	2	74
5	(United States) Vivek Kanthan	8	2	2	29†	2	3	16	6	Ret	73
6	(Belgium) Ean Eyckmans	6	13	20	2	14	6	3	5	**5**	69
7	(Austria) Niklas Schaufler	12	4	Ret	Ret	10	20	4	4	7	39
8	(Brazil) Miguel Costa	9	6	9	24	12	17	Ret	2	6	33
9	(Portugal) Noah Monteiro	13	12	7	4	3	32	9	11	12	32
10	(Lebanon) Christopher El Feghali	3	Ret	Ret	3	9	11	Ret	Ret	25	31
11	(Serbia) Andrej Petrović	14	11	10	10	Ret	9	28	14	1	29
12	(Netherlands) Reno Francot				6	4	5	21	12	18	28
13	(Belgium) Yani Stevenheydens	20	8	8	Ret	8	29	13	1	15	27
14	(Brazil) Filippo Fiorentino	10	7	Ret	5	31†	7	23	Ret	9	23
15	(United States) Hudson Schwartz	5	9	19	9	Ret	10	8	8	23	20
16	(Italy) Alfio Spina	11	10	25†	7	5	36†	30†	17	8	18
17	(Slovakia) Matúš Ryba	16	14	6	Ret	29	33	6	27	21	16
18	(Argentina) Gino Trappa	31†	15	14	8	30†	12	17	25	Ret	4
19	(Argentina) Santiago Baztarrica	23	23	18	Ret	DNS	15	10	10	11	1
20	(Netherlands) Sacha van 't Pad Bosch	18	18	11	16	Ret	14	11	15	10	1
21	(Argentina) Santino Panetta	22	22	Ret	18	11	24	26	16	14	0
22	(Spain) Nacho Tuñón				11	23	19	15	20	Ret	0
23	(Brazil) Alexander Jacoby	32†	24	12	17	24	13	27	26	19	0
24	(Greece) Philippe Armand Karras	19	16	22	15	27	16	12	18	Ret	0
25	(Poland) Wiktor Dobrzański	WD	WD	16	13	28	21	24	Ret	26	0
26	(Sweden) Stepan Suslov	21	19	17	Ret	18	18	19	19	13	0
27	(Austria) Emma Felbermayr	28	20	13	20	21	31				0
28	(Brazil) Aurelia Nobels	17	DNS	15	14	19	28				0
29	(Angola) Lorenzo Campos	26	25	26†	27	16	25	14	23	24	0
30	(Argentina) Francisco Monarca	30	21	27†	19	15	30	20	Ret	17	0
31	(South Korea) Kyuho Lee	15	DNS	DNS	22	Ret	35	22	28	Ret	0
32	(Greece) Jean-Paul Karras	25	Ret	21	28†	20	26	18	22	16	0
33	(United States) Lia Block	24	17	Ret	21	17	22				0
34	(Slovenia) Aleksandar Bogunović				23	22	34	25	21	20	0
35	(Mexico) Christian Garduño	27	26	24	25	26	23	29	24	22	0
36	(Australia) Aiva Anagnostiadis	29	27	23	26	25	27				0
–	(United States) Courtney Crone	WD	WD	WD							0
Pos	Driver	R1	SR	R2	R1	SR	R2	R1	SR	R2	Pts
Pos	Driver	JER (Spain)			POR (Portugal)			NAV (Spain)			Pts

Colour	Result
Gold	Winner
Silver	Second place
Bronze	Third place
Green	Points classification
Blue	Non-points classification
Blue	Non-classified finish (NC)
Purple	Retired, not classified (Ret)
Red	Did not qualify (DNQ)
Red	Did not pre-qualify (DNPQ)
Black	Disqualified (DSQ)
White	Did not start (DNS)
White	Withdrew (WD)
White	Race cancelled (C)
Blank	Did not practice (DNP)
Blank	Did not arrive (DNA)
Blank	Excluded (EX)

**Bold** – Pole
Italics – Fastest Lap
† — Did not finish but classified
Rookie

==== Teams' trophy ====
Each team counts the results (including bonus points if applicable) of its two highest-placed drivers prior to the event. In the case of Round 1, the drivers selected are the two best classified in each team in Race 1.

Pos	Driver	JER (Spain)			POR (Portugal)			NAV (Spain)			Pts
Pos	Driver	R1	SR	R2	R1	SR	R2	R1	SR	R2	Pts
1	(Spain) Griffin Core by Campos Racing	1	5	1	1	1	1	1	3	4	251
1	(Spain) Griffin Core by Campos Racing	2	28	4	Ret	7	2	2	13	Ret	251
2	(Netherlands) MP Motorsport	5	1	3	9	6	8	5	8	3	96
2	(Netherlands) MP Motorsport	7	9	19	12	Ret	10	8	9	23	96
3	(Spain) Campos Racing	8	2	2	24	2	3	9	6	12	85
3	(Spain) Campos Racing	9	6	9	29†	12	17	16	11	Ret	85
4	(Netherlands) KCL by MP Motorsport	6	4	20	2	10	6	3	5	5	77
4	(Netherlands) KCL by MP Motorsport	12	13	Ret	Ret	14	20	21	12	18	77
5	(United Kingdom) Rodin Motorsport	4	3	5	22	13	4	7	7	2	74
5	(United Kingdom) Rodin Motorsport	15	DNS	WD	Ret	Ret	35	22	28	Ret	74
6	(Spain) Drivex	3	7	Ret	3	9	7	23	Ret	9	54
6	(Spain) Drivex	10	Ret	Ret	5	31†	11	Ret	Ret	25	54
7	(Spain) T-Code							11	14	1	26
7	(Spain) T-Code							28	15	10	26
8	(Spain) TC Racing	11	10	25	7	5	15	26	16	8	18
8	(Spain) TC Racing	22	22	Ret	Ret	DNS	36†	30†	17	14	18
9	(Spain) Tecnicar by Amtog	14	11	10	10	28	9	15	20	26	4
9	(Spain) Tecnicar by Amtog	18	18	11	13	Ret	21	24	Ret	Ret	4
10	(France) Saintéloc Racing	19	16	21	15	20	16	12	18	16	0
10	(France) Saintéloc Racing	25	Ret	22	28†	27	26	18	22	Ret	0
11	(Spain) Monlau Motorsport	26	21	26	17	15	13	20	26	17	0
11	(Spain) Monlau Motorsport	30	25	27	19	24	30	27	Ret	19	0
12	(Spain) DXR by Drivex	21	19	17	Ret	18	18	19	19	13	0
13	(France) ART Grand Prix	17	17	15	14	17	22				0
13	(France) ART Grand Prix	24	DNS	Ret	21	19	28				0
14	(Spain) GRS Team							25	21	20	0
15	(Italy) Cram Motorsport	29	27	23	26	25	27				0
15	(Italy) Cram Motorsport				23	22	34				0
Pos	Driver	R1	SR	R2	R1	SR	R2	R1	SR	R2	Pts
Pos	Driver	JER (Spain)			POR (Portugal)			NAV (Spain)			Pts
