= Matúš Ryba =

Slovak racing driver (born 2009)

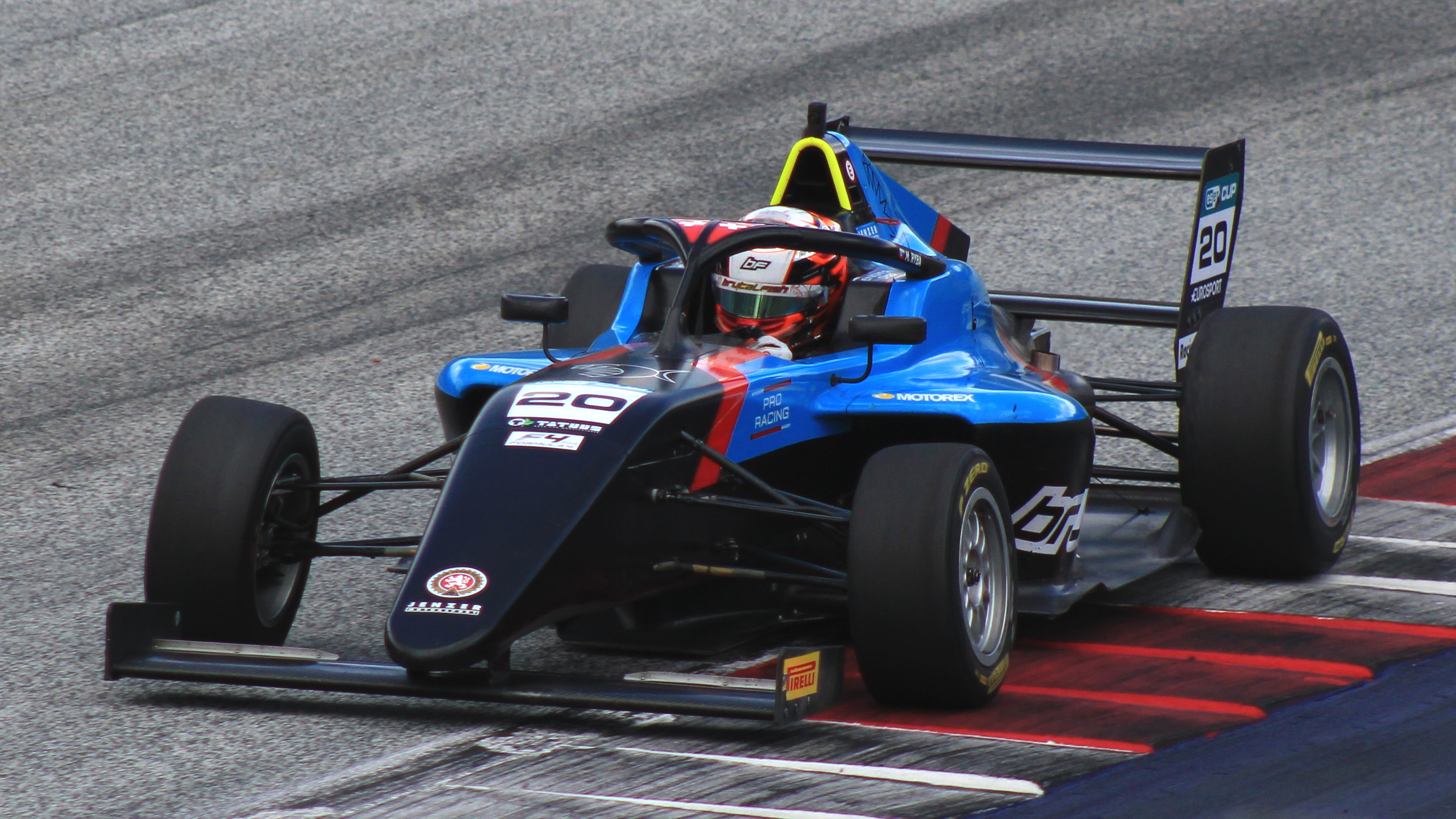
- Ryba in 2024
- Nationality: (Slovakia) Slovak
- Born: 4 May 2009 (age 17) Bratislava, Slovakia
- Relatives: Martin Ryba (father)

Le Mans Cup career
- Debut season: 2026
- Current team: Brutal Fish by Campos
- Categorisation: FIA Silver
- Car number: 19
- Starts: 6
- Wins: 0
- Podiums: 3
- Poles: 0
- Fastest laps: 0
- Best finish: 3rd in 2026
- Statistics up to date as of 14 October 2026.

Matúš Ryba (born 4 May 2009) is a Slovak racing driver who last competed for Brutal Fish by Campos in the LMP3 class of the Le Mans Cup.

== Personal life ==
Ryba is the son of Slovak businessman and TCR Europe driver Martin Ryba, who founded Brutal Fish Racing Team in 2018.

== Career ==
Ryba took up ice hockey at an early age, before taking on karting from 2022 to 2023, most notably finishing 12th in the 2023 IAME Winter Cup with MDC Racing in the X30 Junior category.

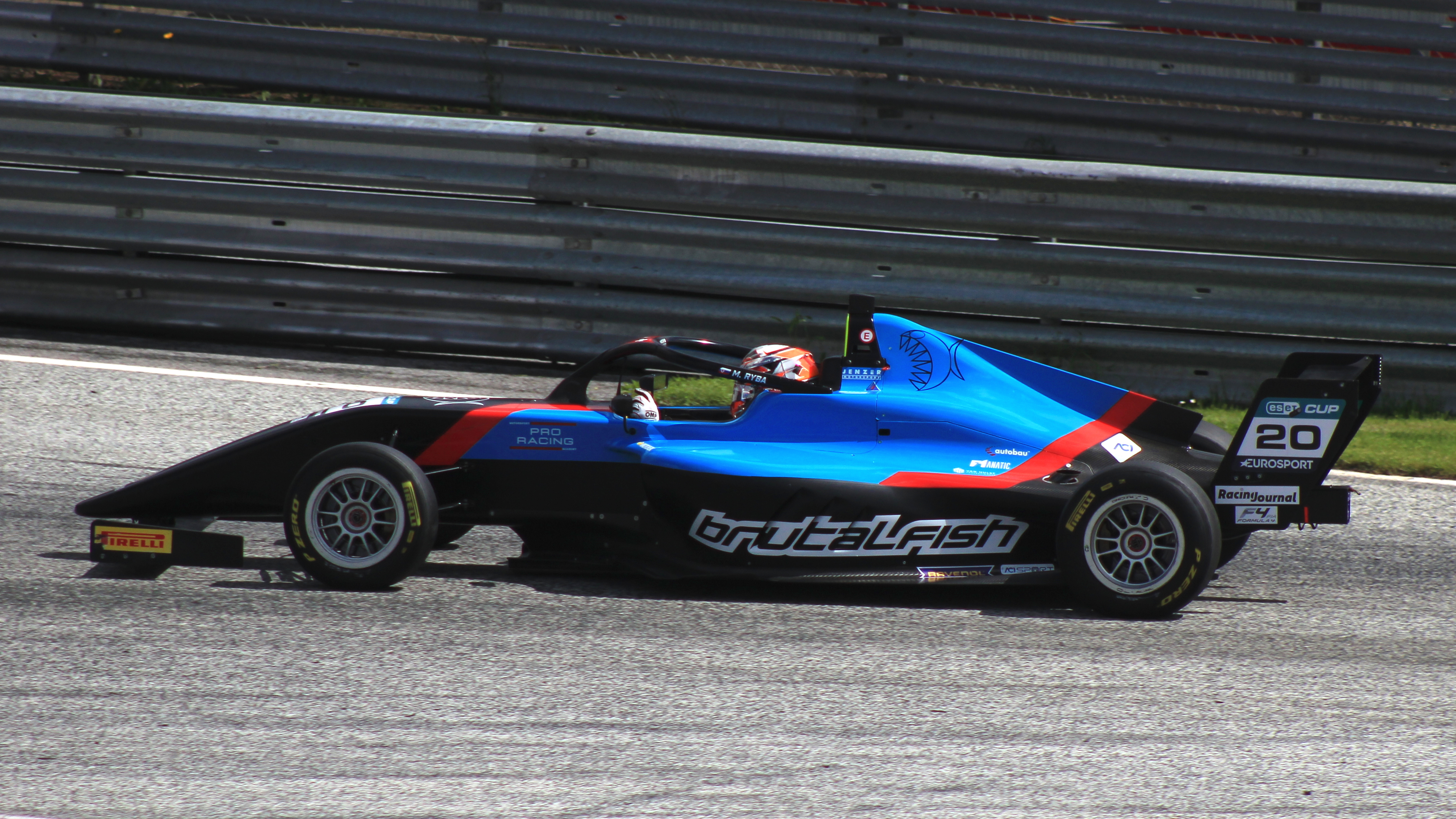
Ryba driving for Jenzer in F4 CEZ at the Red Bull Ring in 2024.

Stepping up to single-seaters in 2024, Ryba joined Drivex to compete in the F4 Spanish Championship. In the seven-round season, Ryba scored a best result of 13th in race two at Jerez to end the year 28th in the overall standings. During 2024, Ryba made one-off appearances for Jenzer Motorsport in the Formula 4 CEZ and Italian F4 Championships, as well as racing for Phinsys by Argenti on a part-time basis in the F4 British Championship. Between his part-time campaigns, Ryba scored his first career points at the Red Bull Ring in CEZ by finishing tenth twice, before taking a best result of ninth at Zandvoort in British F4. Towards the end of the year, Ryba represented Slovakia in the FIA Motorsport Games Formula 4 Cup.

Remaining in single-seaters for 2025, Ryba switched to Campos Racing for a dual campaign in the Eurocup-4 Spanish Winter and F4 Spanish Championships. Starting off the year in the three-round Winter Championship, Ryba finished 17th in points with a best result of sixth at both Jerez and Navarra. In the main season, Ryba scored three points finishes en route to a 15th-place points finish with a best result of sixth at Navarra and Barcelona. At the end of the year, Ryba joined AF Corse–run 23Events Racing to make his sportscar debut in the 2025–26 Asian Le Mans Series in the LMP3 class. After taking his maiden podium in race two at Sepang, Ryba starred at Dubai, recovering from a car breakdown to overtake Alexander Jacoby and Luciano Morano and take his first career win. Ryba ended the season with a third-place finish at Yas Marina to secure third in points.

Continuing in LMP3 competition for the rest of 2026, Ryba joined Brutal Fish by Campos Racing to compete in the Le Mans Cup alongside Lucas Fluxá. After finishing fourth on debut at Barcelona, Ryba led at Le Castellet before a late spin under pressure from Colin Queen, falling to fourth and later inheriting third after a penalty for the #9 ANS car. At Road to Le Mans, Ryba fended off Enzo Peugeot for third, as he helped Brutal Fish by Campos secure a 1-3 finish, before finishing third at the Algarve finale to take third in points. Towards the end of the year, Ryba partook in the European Le Mans Series rookie tests in R-ace GP's Duqueine D09.

== Karting record ==
=== Karting career summary ===
Season	Series	Team	Position
2022	IAME Winter Cup – X30 Junior	MDC Racing	28th
2022	Spanish Karting Championship – Junior	MDC Racing	20th
2022	IAME Warriors Final – X30 Junior	MDC Racing	NC
2022	International IAME Games – X30 Junior	MDC Racing	17th
2022	LeCont Trophy – X30 Junior	MDC Racing	16th
2022	Karting Academy Trophy	Martin Ryba	36th
2023	IAME Winter Cup – X30 Junior	MDC Racing	12th
2023	IAME Euro Series – X30 Junior	MDC Racing	65th
2023	Champions of the Future Euro Series – OK-J	Leclerc by Lennox Racing	68th
2023	Karting European Championship – OK-J	Leclerc by Lennox Racing	51st
2023	WSK Euro Series – OK-J	Leclerc by Lennox Racing	81st

== Racing record ==
=== Racing career summary ===
Season	Series	Team	Races	Wins	Poles	F/Laps	Podiums	Points	Position
2024	F4 Spanish Championship	Drivex	21	0	0	0	0	0	28th
2024	Formula 4 CEZ Championship	Jenzer Motorsport	3	0	0	0	0	3	27th
2024	Italian F4 Championship	Jenzer Motorsport	3	0	0	0	0	0	50th
2024	F4 British Championship	Phinsys by Argenti	8	0	0	0	0	3	31st
2024	FIA Motorsport Games Formula 4 Cup	Team Slovakia	1	0	0	0	0	—N/a	9th
2025	Eurocup-4 Spanish Winter Championship	Griffin Core	9	0	0	0	0	16	17th
2025	F4 Spanish Championship	Griffin Core	21	0	0	0	0	18	16th
2025–26	Asian Le Mans Series – LMP3	23Events Racing	6	1	0	3	4	81	**3rd**
2026	Le Mans Cup – LMP3	Brutal Fish by Campos	6	0	0	0	3	77	**3rd**

^{*} Season still in progress.

=== Complete F4 Spanish Championship results ===
(key) (Races in bold indicate pole position; races in italics indicate fastest lap)

Year	Team	1	2	3	4	5	6	7	8	9	10	11	12	13	14	15	16	17	18	19	20	21	DC	Points
2024	Drivex	JAR; 1; 25	JAR; 2; 25	JAR; 3 Ret	POR; 1; 19	POR; 2; 17	POR; 3; 22	LEC; 1 Ret	LEC; 2; 28†	LEC; 3 Ret	ARA; 1; 33†	ARA; 2; 24	ARA; 3; 26	CRT; 1; 15	CRT; 2; 29	CRT; 3 Ret	JER; 1; 16	JER; 2; 13	JER; 3; 19	CAT; 1; 15	CAT; 2 Ret	CAT; 3 Ret	28th	0
2025	Griffin Core	ARA; 1; 21	ARA; 2; 19	ARA; 3; 12	NAV; 1; 6	NAV; 2; 15	NAV; 3 Ret	POR; 1; 9	POR; 2; 30	POR; 3; 17	LEC; 1; 16	LEC; 2; 11	LEC; 3; 20	JER; 1 Ret	JER; 2; 16	JER; 3; 14	CRT; 1; 15	CRT; 2; 23	CRT; 3; 13	CAT; 1; 17	CAT; 2; 6	CAT; 3; 17	15th	18

=== Complete Formula 4 CEZ Championship results ===
(key) (Races in bold indicate pole position; races in italics indicate fastest lap)

Year	Team	1	2	3	4	5	6	7	8	9	10	11	12	13	14	15	16	17	18	DC	Points
2024	Jenzer Motorsport	BAL; 1	BAL; 2	BAL; 3	RBR; 1; 10	RBR; 2; 14	RBR; 3; 10	SVK; 1	SVK; 2	SVK; 3	MOS; 1	MOS; 2	MOS; 3	BRN; 1	BRN; 2	BRN; 3	SAL; 1	SAL; 2	SAL; 3	27th	3

=== Complete Italian F4 Championship results ===
(key) (Races in bold indicate pole position) (Races in italics indicate fastest lap)

Year	Team	1	2	3	4	5	6	7	8	9	10	11	12	13	14	15	16	17	18	19	20	21	DC	Points
2024	Jenzer Motorsport	MIS; 1	MIS; 2	MIS; 3	IMO; 1 Ret	IMO; 2; 25	IMO; 3; 25	VLL; 1	VLL; 2	VLL; 3	MUG; 1	MUG; 2	MUG; 3	LEC; 1	LEC; 2	LEC; 3	CAT; 1	CAT; 2	CAT; 3	MNZ; 1	MNZ; 2	MNZ; 3	50th	0

=== Complete F4 British Championship results ===
(key) (Races in bold indicate pole position; races in italics indicate fastest lap)

Year	Team	1	2	3	4	5	6	7	8	9	10	11	12	13	14	15	16	17	18	19	20	21	22	23	24	25	26	27	28	29	30	31	32	DC	Points
2024	Phinsys by Argenti	DPN; 1	DPN; 2	DPN; 3	BHI; 1	BHI; 2	BHI; 3	SNE; 1	SNE; 2	SNE; 3	THR; 1	THR; 2	THR; 3	SILGP; 1; 14	SILGP; 2; 12^{1}	SILGP; 3; 12	ZAN; 1 Ret	ZAN; 2; 25	ZAN; 3; 9	KNO; 1	KNO; 2	KNO; 3	DPGP; 1	DPGP; 2	DPGP; 3	DPGP; 4	SILN; 1; 12	SILN; 2 C	SILN; 3; 19	BHGP; 1	BHGP; 2	BHGP; 3	BHGP; 4	31st	3

=== Complete Eurocup-4 Spanish Winter Championship results ===
(key) (Races in bold indicate pole position) (Races in italics indicate fastest lap)

Year	Team	1	2	3	4	5	6	7	8	9	DC	Points
2025	Griffin Core by Campos	JER; 1; 16	JER; 2; 14	JER; 3; 6	POR; 1 Ret	POR; 2; 29	POR; 3; 33	NAV; 1; 6	NAV; 2; 27	NAV; 3; 21	17th	16

=== Complete Asian Le Mans Series results ===
(key) (Races in bold indicate pole position) (Races in italics indicate fastest lap)

Year	Team	Class	Car	Engine	1	2	3	4	5	6	Pos.	Points
2025–26	23Events Racing	LMP3	Ligier JS P325	Toyota V35A 3.5 L V6	SEP; 1 Ret	SEP; 2; 2	DUB; 1; 3	DUB; 2; 1	ABU; 1; 6	ABU; 2; 3	3rd	81

=== Complete Le Mans Cup results ===
(key) (Races in bold indicate pole position; results in italics indicate fastest lap)

Year	Entrant	Class	Chassis	1	2	3	4	5	6	Rank	Points
2026	Brutal Fish by Campos	LMP3	Ligier JS P325	BAR; 4	LEC; 3	LMS; 3	SPA; Ret	SIL; 4	POR; 3	3rd	77

^{*} Season still in progress.
