= Roger Feghali =

Lebanese rally driver

Personal information
- Nationality: (Lebanon) Lebanese
- Born: 20 September 1973 (age 53); Wadi Chahrour, Lebanon

World Rally Championship record
- Years active: 2001, 2002
- Co-driver: (France) Bruno Brissart (Italy) Nicola Arena
- Rallies: 6
- First rally: 2001 Rally Catalunya

Roger Feghali, born on September 20, 1973, in Wadi Chahrour, Lebanon, is a Lebanese rally driver. He is 19 times Lebanese Rally champion and the record holder of wins (19) in Rally of Lebanon which is part of the Middle East Rally Championship MERC.

Aside from his successful driving career, Roger is also a mechanical engineer. He manages his own team called Motortune Racing which specializes in the preparation and management of rally cars.

== Palmares ==
- 19 Times Lebanese Rally Champion: 97–98–99–2000–07–08–09–10–11-12-13-15-17-18-21-23-24-25-26
- 19 Times Winner of Rally of Lebanon (MERC): 2000–03–04–06–07–08–09–10–11-12-13-15-17-18-21-23-25-26
- Winner of Rally d'Antibes: 2015 (French Rally Championship)
- Winner of Lebanese Hill Climb champion: 2015-16-17-19-20-21-22-23-24-26
- 2nd Overall in Rally of Lebanon 1999 and Jordan Rally 2009, 2012 and 2013 and Troodos Rally 2009 (MERC) and Cyprus Rally 2010 (MERC/IRC) and 2016 (MERC)
- Winner of Red Bull Ras B Ras competition (ME ROC): 2011
- Winner of Toyota Race of Middle East Champions: 2001-2
- Winner and Record holder of TalelRumman Hill Climb (Jordan): 2007-13-14-23-26
- Winner and Record holder of Panorama Hill Climb (Jordan): 2024
- Winner of 50 Lebanese Local Rallies:
  - Rally du Printemps: 97–99–2000–04- 07- 08- 09- 10- 11- 12- 14- 15- 17- 18- 21- 22- 23-25-26
  - Rally des Cedres: 1997–99–2000–06–07–08–09–10-11-12-14-17-19-24
  - Ronde Hivernal: 97- 98- 99- 2000- 04
  - Rally Jezzine: 2012- 13- 14- 15- 18- 19- 21- 22 - 23-25
  - Rally of Lebanon: 2024
  - Batroun Rally: 2025
  - Ehden Rally: 2026
- Winner of 14 Jordanian Local Rallies
- Rally Elpa Halkidikis (ERC): 2nd Overall & 1st Grp N 2001
- Rally Catalogne (WRC): 2nd Grp N - 2001
- Rally Monte Carlo (WRC): 3rd Grp 1600 - 2002
- Winner of 35 Lebanese Hill Climbs:
  - Deir el Qamar International Hill Climb (ME championship): 2007
  - Deir el Qamar: 2017
  - Falougha: 2014-15-25-26
  - Arsoun:2016-18
  - Baabdat:2016-17-19
  - Bkessine:2015-16
  - Roumieh: 2017
  - Medyar:2018-22-23-24-25
  - Mraijat:2019-20-21-22-26
  - Wadi Chahrour: 2019-21-22-23-24
  - Hasbaya:2020-21
  - Blat: 2023
  - Bikfaya: 2024-25-26
- Winner Michelin Trophy (and S2000 class) in Rallye du Rouergue 2014 (French Rally Championship)
- Winner of Shiraz Rally 2014 (MERC candidate)
- 3 times Lebanese Speed Test champion 2018-19-21
- 2nd Masters category in MENA karting championship in Qatar 2023
