= Ean Eyckmans =

Belgian racing driver (born 2008)

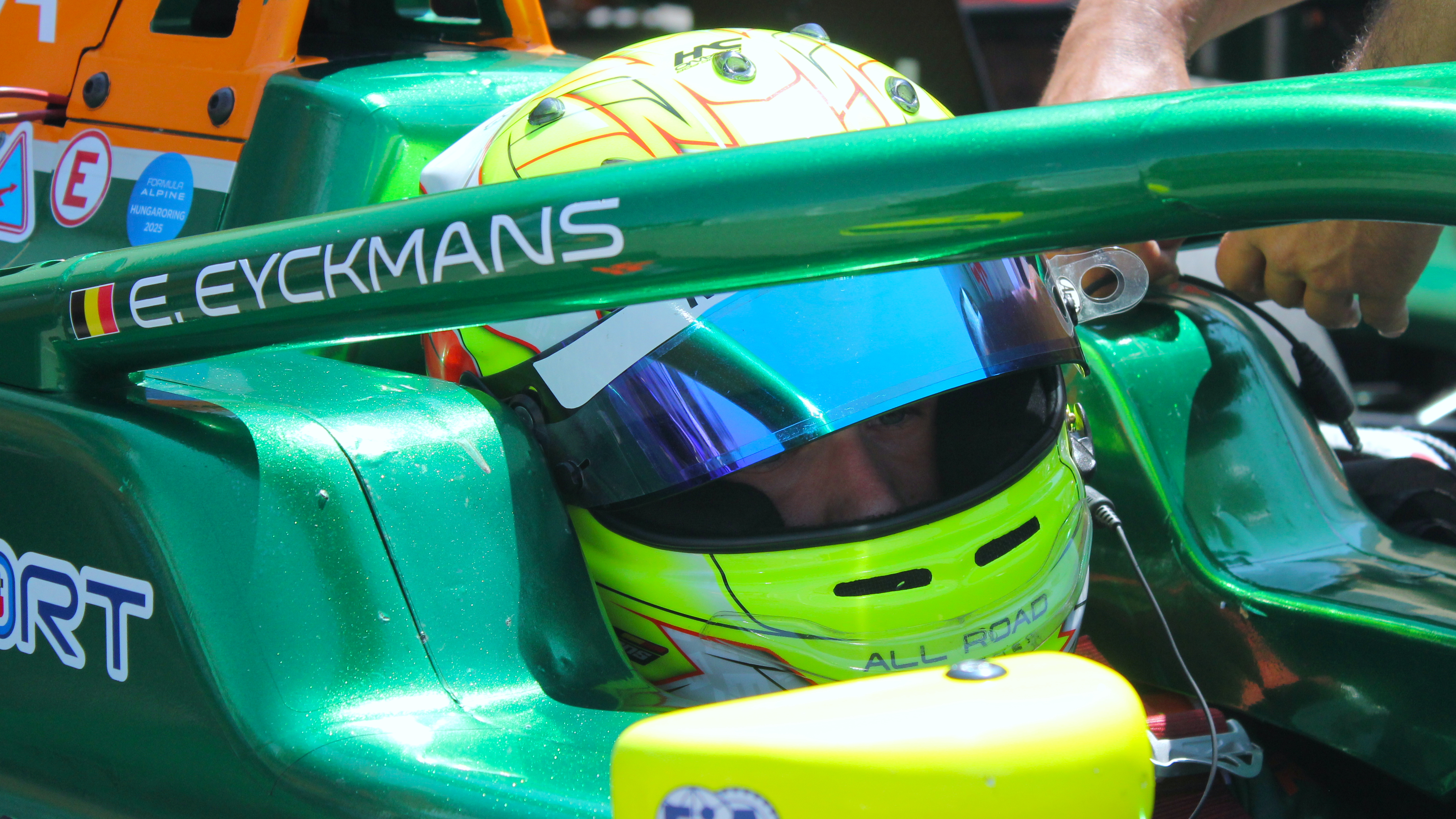
- Eyckmans in 2025
- Nationality: (Belgium) Belgian
- Born: 30 January 2008 (age 18) Geel, Belgium
- Relatives: Wim Eyckmans (father)

Eurocup-3 career
- Debut season: 2026
- Current team: MP Motorsport
- Car number: 4
- Starts: 19
- Wins: 1
- Podiums: 5
- Poles: 1
- Fastest laps: 0
- Best finish: 4th in 2026

Previous series
- 2026 2025 2025 2025: Eurocup-3 Spanish Winter; FR European; F4 Spanish; Eurocup-4 Spanish Winter
- Statistics up to date as of 17 November 2026.

Ean Eyckmans (born 30 January 2008) is a Belgian racing driver who last competed in the Eurocup-3 for MP Motorsport.

Eyckmans is the 2025 F4 Spanish runner-up.

== Personal life ==
Eyckmans is the son of former racing driver Wim Eyckmans. He grew up in Herentals, Belgium.

== Career ==
=== Karting (2016–2024) ===
Eyckmans began karting competitively in 2016, competing until 2024. Starting out in Mini karts, his three-year stint in the category was headlined by finishing runner-up in the WSK Final Cup and WSK Super Master Series in 2018 and 2019, respectively. Eyckmans also finished third in the 2018 Italian Karting Championship and second in the 2019 Andrea Margutti Trophy during his time in Mini karts.

Stepping up to OK-J and joining Kosmic Racing Department in 2020, Eyckmans spent two years in the category, most notably finishing third in the Karting European Championship in 2021. Eyckmans then moved to Senior karts the following year, in which he finished second in the X30 Senior class of the LeCont Trophy and third in OK.

Remaining in Senior karts across the next two years, Eyckmans won the WSK Super Master Series in 2024, as well as finishing runner-up in the South Garda Winter Cup and IAME Benelux in 2023, and finishing third in the IAME Warriors Final the same year. During his final year in karts, Eyckmans also made a one-off appearance in the Australian Kart Championship, racing in both the X30 and Tag 125 classes in Victoria.

=== Formula 4 (2025) ===
After winning the Richard Mille Young Talent Shootout, Eyckmans was announced to be making the step up to the F4 Spanish Championship with MP Motorsport. He started 2025 with KCL by MP Motorsport in the Eurocup-4 Spanish Winter Championship, where he achieved two podiums – at Portimão and Navarra, where he also got his maiden pole position – and ended the series in sixth.

In the main championship, he got a podium in the first round at Aragón and collected six podiums – including five second places in six races – before getting his maiden car racing win in the first race at Jerez, the fifth round of the series. Eyckmans achieved his final win in the last race of the season in Barcelona and ended the championship runner-up and was the highest finishing rookie.

=== Formula Regional (2025–) ===
==== 2025 ====
In July 2025, Eyckmans was announced to be competing in the Formula Regional European Championship from the Hungaroring round onwards, replacing Enzo Peugeot. Taking part in five rounds, Eyckmans scored a best result of tenth at both Imola and Red Bull Ring to end the season nineteenth in points.

==== 2026 ====
During the winter, Eyckmans raced in the Eurocup-3 winter series with MP Motorsport.

For the main campaign, Eyckmans is set to compete in Eurocup-3, remaining with MP Motorsport.

== Karting record ==
=== Karting career summary ===
Season	Series	Team	Position
2016	WSK Champions Cup - 60 Mini	EGP Racing Team	NC
2016	WSK Super Master Series - 60 Mini	EGP Racing Team	56th
2016	WSK Final Cup - 60 Mini	EGP Racing Team	NC
2017	WSK Champions Cup - 60 Mini	EGP Racing Team	NC
2017	WSK Super Master Series - 60 Mini	EGP Racing Team	22nd
2017	Italian Karting Championship - 60 Mini		10th
2017	46° Trofeo Delle Industrie - 60 Mini	Intrepid Driver Program	5th
2017	WSK Final Cup - 60 Mini	Intrepid Driver Program	21st
2018	WSK Champions Cup - 60 Mini	Energy Corse	19th
2018	WSK Super Master Series - 60 Mini	Energy Corse	12th
2018	WSK Open Cup - 60 Mini	Babyrace Driver Academy	5th
2018	WSK Final Cup - 60 Mini	Babyrace Driver Academy	2nd
2018	Italian Karting Championship - 60 Mini		3rd
2019	WSK Champions Cup - 60 Mini	Babyrace Driver Academy	6th
2019	WSK Super Master Series - 60 Mini	Babyrace Driver Academy	2nd
2019	WSK Euro Series - 60 Mini	Babyrace Driver Academy	7th
2019	Andrea Margutti Trophy - 60 Mini	Babyrace Driver Academy	2nd
2019	IAME Euro Series - X30 Mini	Babyrace Driver Academy	52nd
2019	Italian ACI Karting Championship - 60 Mini		9th
2020	WSK Super Master Series - OK-J	Kosmic Racing Department	19th
2020	WSK Euro Series - OK-J	Kosmic Racing Department	53rd
2020	Champions of the Future - OK-J	Kosmic Racing Department	33rd
2020	Karting European Championship - OK-J	Kosmic Racing Department	21st
2020	Karting World Championship - OK-J	Kosmic Racing Department	10th
2020	WSK Open Cup - OK-J	Kosmic Racing Department	39th
2021	WSK Champions Cup - OK-J	Kosmic Racing Department	19th
2021	WSK Super Master Series - OK-J	Kosmic Racing Department	25th
2021	Karting European Championship - OK-J	Kosmic Racing Department	3rd
2021	Champions of the Future - OK-J	Kosmic Racing Department	16th
2021	WSK Euro Series - OK-J	Kosmic Racing Department	31st
2021	WSK Open Cup - OK-J	Kosmic Racing Department	8th
2021	Karting World Championship - OK-J	Kosmic Racing Department	16th
2022	WSK Super Master Series - OK	EGP Racing Team	18th
2022	Champions of the Future Winter Series - OK	EGP Racing Team	19th
2022	Champions of the Future - OK	EGP Racing Team	10th
2022	Karting European Championship - OK	EGP Racing Team	9th
2022	WSK Final Cup - OK	EGP Racing Team	13th
2022	LeCont Trophy - OK	EGP Racing Team	3rd
2022	LeCont Trophy - X30 Senior	EGP Racing Team	2nd
2022	WSK Euro Series - OK	Ward Racing	35th
2022	Karting World Championship - OK	Ward Racing	13th
2023	South Garda Winter Cup - OK	EGP Racing Team	2nd
2023	IAME Winter Cup - X30 Senior	EGP Racing Team	6th
2023	IAME Euro Series - X30 Senior	EGP Racing Team	7th
2023	IAME Warriors Final - X30 Senior	EGP Racing Team	3rd
2023	IAME Benelux Series - X30 Senior		2nd
2023	Champions of the Future Euro Series - OK	Ward Racing; Leclerc by Lennox Racing (Note: Eyckmans competed for Ward Racing in rounds 1-3 and for Leclerc by Lennox Racing in rounds 4-5.)	19th
2023	Karting European Championship - OK	Ward Racing; Leclerc by Lennox Racing (Note: Eyckmans competed for Ward Racing in rounds 1-3 and for Leclerc by Lennox Racing in round 4.)	11th
2023	WSK Euro Series - OK	Leclerc by Lennox Racing	22nd
2023	Karting World Championship - OK	Leclerc by Lennox Racing	15th
2023	WSK Final Cup - OK	Leclerc by Lennox Racing	7th
2024	WSK Champions Cup - OK	Birel ART Racing	6th
2024	WSK Super Master Series - OK	Birel ART Racing	1st
2024	Champions of the Future Euro Series - OK	Birel ART Racing	27th
2024	Karting European Championship - OK	Birel ART Racing	23rd
2024	WSK Euro Series - OK	Birel ART Racing	14th
2024	Australian Kart Championship - TAG 125	Patrizicorse	32nd
2024	Australian Kart Championship - X30	Patrizicorse	19th
2024	Karting World Championship - OK	EGP Racing Team	NC

== Racing record ==
=== Racing career summary ===
Season	Series	Team	Races	Wins	Poles	F/Laps	Podiums	Points	Position
2025	Eurocup-4 Spanish Winter Championship	KCL by MP Motorsport	9	0	1	0	2	69	6th
2025	F4 Spanish Championship	MP Motorsport	21	2	0	1	11	235	**2nd**
2025	Formula Regional European Championship	RPM	8	0	0	0	0	2	19th
2026	Eurocup-3 Spanish Winter Championship	MP Motorsport	9	0	1	0	1	53	7th
2026	Eurocup-3	MP Motorsport	19	1	1	0	5	194	4th

* Season still in progress.

=== Complete Eurocup-4 Spanish Winter Championship results ===
(key) (Races in bold indicate pole position) (Races in italics indicate fastest lap)

Year	Team	1	2	3	4	5	6	7	8	9	DC	Points
2025	KCL by MP Motorsport	JER; 1; 6	JER; 2; 13	JER; 3; 20	POR; 1; 2	POR; 2; 14	POR; 3; 6	NAV; 1; 3	NAV; 2; 5	**NAV**; **3**; 5	6th	69

=== Complete F4 Spanish Championship results ===
(key) (Races in bold indicate pole position; races in italics indicate fastest lap)

Year	Team	1	2	3	4	5	6	7	8	9	10	11	12	13	14	15	16	17	18	19	20	21	DC	Points
2025	MP Motorsport	ARA; 1; 12	ARA; 2; 2	ARA; 3; 14	NAV; 1; 11	NAV; 2; 28†	NAV; 3; 3	POR; 1; 2	POR; 2; 2	POR; 3; 4	LEC; 1; 2	LEC; 2; 2	LEC; 3; 2	JER; 1; 1	JER; 2 Ret	JER; 3; 5	CRT; 1; 3	CRT; 2; 4	CRT; 3; 6	CAT; 1; 3	CAT; 2; 17	CAT; 3; 1	2nd	235

=== Complete Formula Regional European Championship results ===
(key) (Races in bold indicate pole position) (Races in italics indicate fastest lap)

Year	Team	1	2	3	4	5	6	7	8	9	10	11	12	13	14	15	16	17	18	19	20	DC	Points
2025	RPM	MIS; 1	MIS; 2	SPA; 1	SPA; 2	ZAN; 1	ZAN; 2	HUN; 1 Ret	HUN; 2; 12	LEC; 1; 22	LEC; 2 Ret	IMO; 1; 17	IMO; 2; 10	RBR; 1; 10	RBR; 2; 15	CAT; 1	CAT; 2	HOC; 1	HOC; 2	MNZ; 1	MNZ; 2	19th	2

=== Complete Eurocup-3 Spanish Winter Championship results ===
(key) (Races in bold indicate pole position) (Races in italics indicate fastest lap)

Year	Team	1	2	3	4	5	6	7	8	9	DC	Points
2026	MP Motorsport	**POR**; **1**; 10	POR; SPR; 4	POR; 2; 2	JAR; 1; 23†	JAR; SPR; 5	JAR; 2 Ret	ARA; 1; 7	ARA; SPR; 8	ARA; 2; 5	7th	53

=== Complete Eurocup-3 results ===
(key) (Races in bold indicate pole position; races in italics indicate fastest lap)

Year	Team	1	2	3	4	5	6	7	8	9	10	11	12	13	14	15	16	17	18	19	DC	Points
2026	MP Motorsport	LEC; 1; 4	LEC; SR; 4	LEC; 2; 3	POR; 1 Ret	POR; 2; 4	IMO; 1; 1	IMO; SR; 4	IMO; 2; 6	MNZ; 1; 8	MNZ; 2; 5	SIL; 1; 5	SIL; 2; 2	JER; 1; 13	JER; SR; 4	JER; 2; 8	**HUN**; **1**; 3	HUN; 2; 5	CAT; 1; 5	CAT; 2; 2	4th	194
