= Lebanese Rally Championship =

Motorsport event

- Country: Lebanon
- Inaugural season: 1986
- Drivers' champion: (Lebanon) Tamer Ghandour
- Official website: https://atclmotorsports.com/

Lebanese Rally Championship is the national rally championship of Lebanon.

== Champions ==
| Season | Driver | | 2021 | Roger Feghali | Skoda Fabia |
| 2020 | George ChwAyre | Running - No Benzine | | | |
| 2019 | Patrick Njeim | Mitsubishi Lancer Evo | | | |
| 2018 | Roger Feghali | Škoda Fabia | | | |
| 2017 | Roger Feghali | Mitsubishi Lancer Evo / Škoda Fabia | | | |
| 2016 | Tamer Ghandour | Mitsubishi Lancer Evo | | | |
| 2015 | Roger Feghali | Mitsubishi Lancer Evo / Ford Fiesta | | | |
| 2014 | Roger Feghali | Mitsubishi Lancer Evo / Ford Fiesta | | | |
| 2013 | Abdo Feghali | Mitsubishi Lancer Evo / Mini JCW | | | |
| 2012 | Roger Feghali | Mitsubishi Lancer Evo / Ford Fiesta | | | |
| 2011 | Roger Feghali | Mitsubishi Lancer Evo | | | |
| 2010 | Roger Feghali | Mitsubishi Lancer Evo / Škoda Fabia | | | |
| 2009 | Roger Feghali | Mitsubishi Lancer Evo | | | |
| 2008 | Roger Feghali | Mitsubishi Lancer Evo / Subaru Impreza | | | |
| 2007 | Roger Feghali | Mitsubishi Lancer Evo | | | |
| 2006 | Abdo Feghali | Mitsubishi Lancer Evo / Subaru Impreza | | | |
| 2005 | Abdo Feghali | Mitsubishi Lancer Evo | | | |
| 2004 | Abdo Feghali | Mitsubishi Lancer Evo | | | |
| 2003 | Elan (Nadim Abboud) | Mitsubishi Lancer Evo | | | |
| 2002 | Michel Saleh | Toyota Celica | | | |
| 2001 | Doumit Bou Doumit | Mitsubishi Lancer Evo | | | |
| 2000 | Roger Feghali | Lancia Delta HF Integrale | | | |
| 1999 | Roger Feghali | VW Golf Kit Car | | | |
| 1998 | Roger Feghali | Renault Clio Williams | | | |
| 1997 | Roger Feghali | Renault Clio Williams | | | |
| 1996 | Zee Ohg (Ziad Ghandour) | Subaru Impreza | | | |
| 1995 | Jean-Pierre Nasrallah | Lancia Delta HF Integrale | | | |
| 1994 | Jean-Pierre Nasrallah | Lancia Delta HF Integrale | | | |
| 1993 | Elie Antypas | Lancia Delta HF Integrale | | | |
| 1992 | Bagheera (Maurice Sehnaoui) | Ford Sierra Cosworth | | | |
| 1991 | Nabil Karam | BMW M3 | | | |
| 1989–90 | Not Held | | | | |
| 1988 | Samir Ghanem | Nissan 240RS | | | |
| 1987 | Michel Saleh | Opel Manta | | | |
| 1986 | Nabil Karam | Porsche 911 | | | |
