= F4 Spanish Championship =

Spanish Formula 4 racing series

- Category: FIA Formula 4
- Country: Spain
- Inaugural season: 2016
- Constructors: Tatuus
- Engine suppliers: Abarth
- Tyre suppliers: Hankook
- Drivers' champion: (Belgium) Thomas Strauven
- Teams' champion: (Spain) Griffin Core by Campos
- Official website: Official website

The F4 Spanish Championship (Spanish: Campeonato de España de Fórmula 4) is an FIA Formula 4 racing series. The championship was planned to launch in 2015, though the inaugural season was cancelled and delayed until 2016. Koiranen GP was the promoter of the championship for the first two seasons. The current promoter is Agrupación Deportiva F4 Spain.

== History ==
Gerhard Berger and the FIA Singleseater Commission launched the FIA Formula 4 in March 2013. The goal of the Formula 4 is to make the ladder to Formula 1 more transparent. Besides sporting and technical regulations, costs are regulated too. A car to compete in this category may not exceed €30.000 in purchase. A single season in Formula 4 may not exceed €100.000 in costs. The Spanish F4 will be one of the second phase Formula 4 championship to be launched. The first phase championships was the Italian F4 Championship and the Formula 4 Sudamericana which started in 2014. The Spanish championship was launched by the RFEDA on 14 November 2014. French race car constructor Mygale was contracted to design and build all the cars. Ultimately the whole idea was abandoned.

With the announcement that Koiranen as the promoter of the championship, the Spanish F4 championship started in 2016. Due to this partnership, the championship made use of Tatuus cars, Abarth turbocharged engines and Hankook tyres, employing the same technical regulations as the SMP F4 Championship, which Koiranen also promoted.

== Car ==
The championship features Tatuus designed and built cars. The cars are constructed out of carbon fibre and feature a monocoque chassis. From 2016 season to 2021, the series used model F4-T014. From the 2022 onwards, the series has used Tatuus F4-T421. The engine is a 1.4L turbo Abarth.

== Champions ==
=== Drivers' ===
Season	Driver	Team	Poles	Wins	Podiums	Fastest laps	Points	Clinched	Margin
2016	(Netherlands) Richard Verschoor	(Netherlands) MP Motorsport	15	17	19	16	368	Race 17 of 20	124
2017	(Denmark) Christian Lundgaard	(Netherlands) MP Motorsport	7	7	17	7	330	Race 17 of 20	64
2018	(Belgium) Amaury Cordeel	(Netherlands) MP Motorsport	6	3	13	9	208	Race 18 of 18	4
2019	(Argentina) Franco Colapinto	(Spain) Drivex School	10	11	13	10	325	Race 19 of 21	103
2020	(Netherlands) Kas Haverkort	(Netherlands) MP Motorsport	12	13	17	9	383	Race 18 of 21	111
2021	(Netherlands) Dilano van 't Hoff	(Netherlands) MP Motorsport	13	10	16	6	361	Race 17 of 21	130
2022	(Bulgaria) Nikola Tsolov	(Spain) Campos Racing	15	13	18	17	400	Race 18 of 21	116
2023	(France) Théophile Naël	(France) Saintéloc Racing	5	8	14	5	314	Race 21 of 21	23
2024	(Italy) Mattia Colnaghi	(Netherlands) KCL by MP Motorsport	7	6	12	5	282	Race 21 of 21	10
2025	(Belgium) Thomas Strauven	(Spain) Campos Racing Griffin Core	10	9	16	11	392	Race 17 of 21	157

=== Teams' ===
Season	Team	Poles	Wins	Podiums	Fastest laps	Points	Clinched	Margin
2016	(Netherlands) MP Motorsport	16	18	19	16	616	Race 17 of 20	164
2017	(Netherlands) MP Motorsport	7	7	17	7	619	Race 18 of 20	133
2018	(Netherlands) MP Motorsport	8	3	27	10	277	Race 17 of 18	20
2019	(Spain) Drivex School	10	12	16	12	398	Race 21 of 21	30
2020	(Netherlands) MP Motorsport	18	18	53	20	745	Race 12 of 21	506
2021	(Netherlands) MP Motorsport	14	11	26	11	581	Race 18 of 21	163
2022	(Spain) Campos Racing	20	19	36	22	687	Race 18 of 21	193
2023	(Netherlands) MP Motorsport	6	4	29	5	468	Race 21 of 21	2
2024	(Netherlands) KCL by MP Motorsport	11	11	22	6	458	Race 21 of 21	88
2025	(Spain) Griffin Core by Campos Racing	18	13	28	13	470	Race 21 of 21	86

=== Female Driver Trophy ===
Season	Driver	Team	Poles	Wins	Podiums	Fastest laps	Points	Clinched	Margin
2017	(Spain) Marta García	(Netherlands) MP Motorsport	0	0	0	0	70	Race 17 of 20	N/A
2019	(Spain) Belén García	(Spain) Global Racing Service	0	1	1	0	36	Race 21 of 21	1
2020	(Switzerland) Léna Bühler	(Spain) Drivex School	0	0	0	0	23	Race 19 of 21	N/A
2021	(Netherlands) Emely de Heus	(Netherlands) MP Motorsport	0	0	0	0	23	Race 21 of 21	N/A
2022	(France) Lola Lovinfosse	(Spain) Teo Martín Motorsport	0	0	0	0	65	Race 12 of 12	17

=== Rookies' ===
Season	Driver	Team	Poles	Wins	Podiums	Fastest laps	Points	Clinched	Margin
2018	(Belgium) Amaury Cordeel	(Netherlands) MP Motorsport	6	3	13	9	208	Race 11 of 18	117
2019	(Argentina) Franco Colapinto	(Spain) Drivex School	10	11	13	10	325	Race 19 of 21	103
2020	(Netherlands) Kas Haverkort	(Netherlands) MP Motorsport	12	13	17	9	383	Race 18 of 21	111
2021	(Netherlands) Dilano van 't Hoff	(Netherlands) MP Motorsport	13	13	17	6	359	Race 16 of 21	133
2022	(Bulgaria) Nikola Tsolov	(Spain) Campos Racing	15	17	21	17	417	Race 18 of 21	85
2023	(France) Enzo Deligny	(Spain) Campos Racing	0	2	12	2	240	Race 20 of 21	69
2024	(Italy) Mattia Colnaghi	(Netherlands) KCL by MP Motorsport	7	6	12	5	282	Race 19 of 21	95
2025	(Belgium) Ean Eyckmans	(Netherlands) KCL MP Motorsport	0	2	11	1	235	Race 17 of 21	138

=== Galfer Trophy ===
Season	Driver	Team	Poles
2018	(Belgium) Amaury Cordeel	(Netherlands) MP Motorsport	6

== Drivers graduated to F2 ==
- **Bold** denotes an active Formula 2 driver.
- italic denotes a driver graduated to Formula One.
- Gold background denotes F4 Spanish champion.

Driver	F4 Spanish				FIA Formula 2				
Driver	Seasons	Races	Wins	Podiums	Seasons	First team	Races	Wins	Podiums
(Denmark) Christian Lundgaard	2017	20	7	17	2019–2021	Trident	50	2	9
(Netherlands) Richard Verschoor	2016	20	17	19	2021–2025	MP Motorsport	129	8	20
(Netherlands) Bent Viscaal	2017	19	5	12	2021	Trident	23	0	2
(Belgium) Amaury Cordeel	2018	17	4	12	2022–2025	MP Motorsport	101	0	0
(Argentina) Franco Colapinto	2018–2019	25	12	15	2023–2024	MP Motorsport	22	2	3
(Italy) Matteo Nannini	2019	3	0	0	2021	HWA Racelab	8	0	0
(Germany) **Oliver Goethe**	2019–2020	24	1	6	2024–2026	MP Motorsport	37	0	0
(Spain) Pepe Martí	2021	21	2	9	2024–2025	Campos Racing	50	4	9
(Republic of Ireland) **Alex Dunne**	2021	9	0	1	2025–2026	Rodin	27	2	8
(Norway) **Martinius Stenshorne**	2022	3	0	0	2025–2026	Trident	8	0	0
(Bulgaria) **Nikola Tsolov**	2022	21	13	18	2025–2026	Campos Racing	6	1	2
(Thailand) **Tasanapol Inthraphuvasak**	2022	21	1	2	2025–2026	Trident	4	0	0
(Spain) **Mari Boya**	2020	21	3	14	2026	Prema Racing	2	0	0

== Circuits ==
- **Bold** denotes a circuit will be used in the 2026 season.

Number	Countries, Circuits	Rounds	Years
1	(Spain) **MotorLand Aragón**	11	2016–present
1	(Spain) **Circuit de Barcelona-Catalunya**	11	2016–present
1	(Spain) **Circuito de Jerez**	11	2016–present
5	(Spain) **Circuito de Navarra**	10	2016–2023, 2025–present
5	(Spain) **Circuit Ricardo Tormo**	10	2016, 2018–present
6	(Portugal) **Algarve International Circuit**	8	2016, 2018–2019, 2021–2022, 2024–present
7	(Spain) **Circuito del Jarama**	4	2016, 2020, 2024, 2026–2027
7	(France) Circuit Paul Ricard	4	2019–2020, 2024–2025
9	(Belgium) Circuit de Spa-Francorchamps	3	2021–2023
10	(Portugal) Circuito do Estoril	2	2017, 2023
11	(France) Circuit Paul Armagnac	1	2017
