= Joshua Dufek =

Austrian and Swiss racing driver (born 2004)

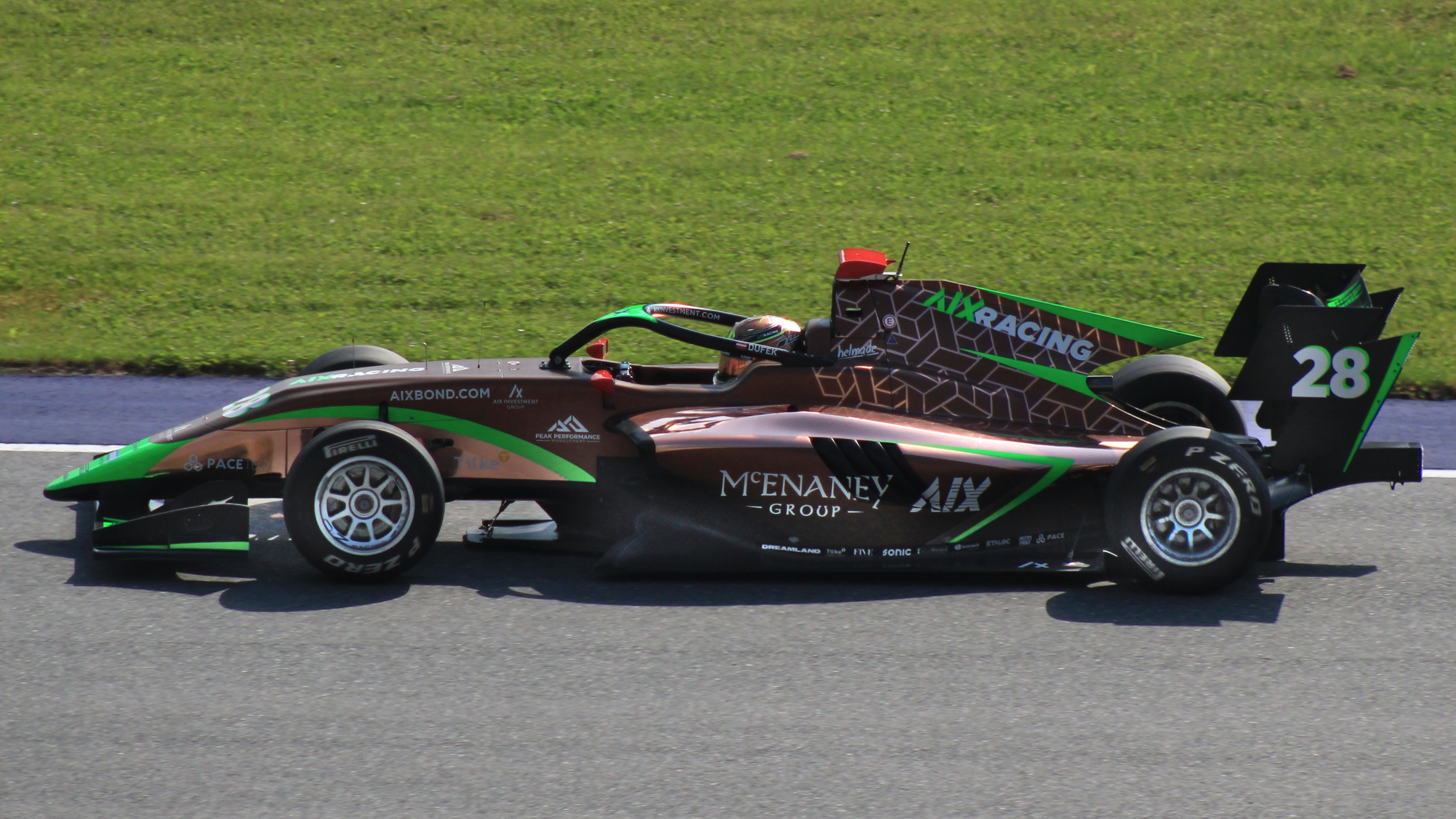
- Dufek in 2024
- Nationality: (Switzerland) Swiss (Austria) Austrian via dual nationality
- Born: 13 December 2004 (age 21) Camden, London, England

FIA Formula 3 Championship career
- Debut season: 2023
- Car number: 15
- Former teams: Campos Racing, AIX Racing, Hitech TGR
- Starts: 30
- Wins: 0
- Podiums: 0
- Poles: 0
- Fastest laps: 0
- Best finish: 28th in 2024

Previous series
- 2023 2023 2022–2023 2022 2021 2021 2020: Euroformula Open; FR Middle East Championship; FR European Championship; FR Asian Championship; ADAC Formula 4 Italian F4 Championship; F4 Spanish Championship

Joshua Dufek (born 13 December 2004) is an Austrian and Swiss racing driver who most recently competed in the 2025 FIA Formula 3 Championship for Hitech TGR.

Dufek previously drove for Van Amersfoort Racing in F4 and FRECA and for CryptoTower in the Euroformula Open, achieving a pair of victories.

== Career ==
=== Lower formulae ===
==== 2020 ====
Having started kart racing at the age of seven, Dufek followed up his karting career with a move into single-seaters in 2020, competing in the F4 Spanish Championship with MP Motorsport. His season would start out slowly compared to his teammates Kas Haverkort and Mari Boya, with just one podium and pole position scored in race three in Navarra to show for his efforts. Dufek's results would improve afterwards, getting two back-to-back third places in the third round at Jerez, and followed that up by finishing second twice at the following event in Valencia, crossing the finish line less than a second after teammate Haverkort. The Swiss driver scored three more podiums in the latter half of the campaign, finishing the season in fourth position in the standings, tied on points with fellow rookie Thomas ten Brinke.

==== 2021 ====
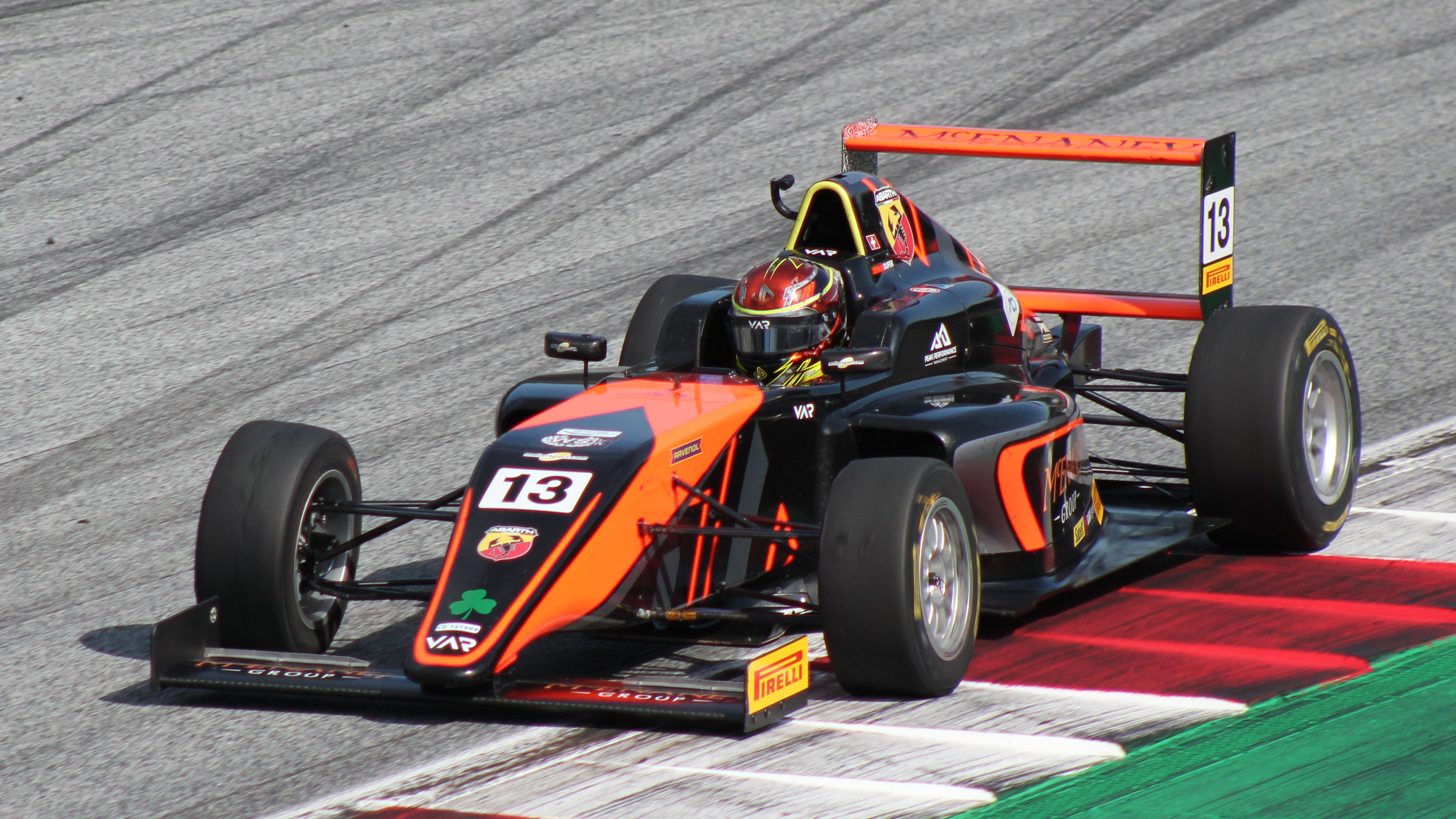
Dufek racing in the 2021 Italian F4 Championship at the Red Bull Ring.

In 2021, Dufek moved to Van Amersfoort Racing, partnering Oliver Bearman and Nikita Bedrin in the Italian and ADAC Formula 4 series. His campaign in the former championship began in similar fashion to his 2020 season, having to wait for a podium until the eighth race of the season at Vallelunga. He scored another podium in Imola, and went on to make a bold call to switch to rain tyres during the final race at the Red Bull Ring, which allowed him to charge to second place. His weekend of the season would come in Mugello: after having taken all three pole-positions of the event in qualifying, Dufek finished second in the first race and came out victorious in race 2, having lost the lead at the start but taking it back after overtakes on Oliver Bearman and Sebastián Montoya. Dufek ended his season in the Italian championship in seventh place after amassing 154 points.

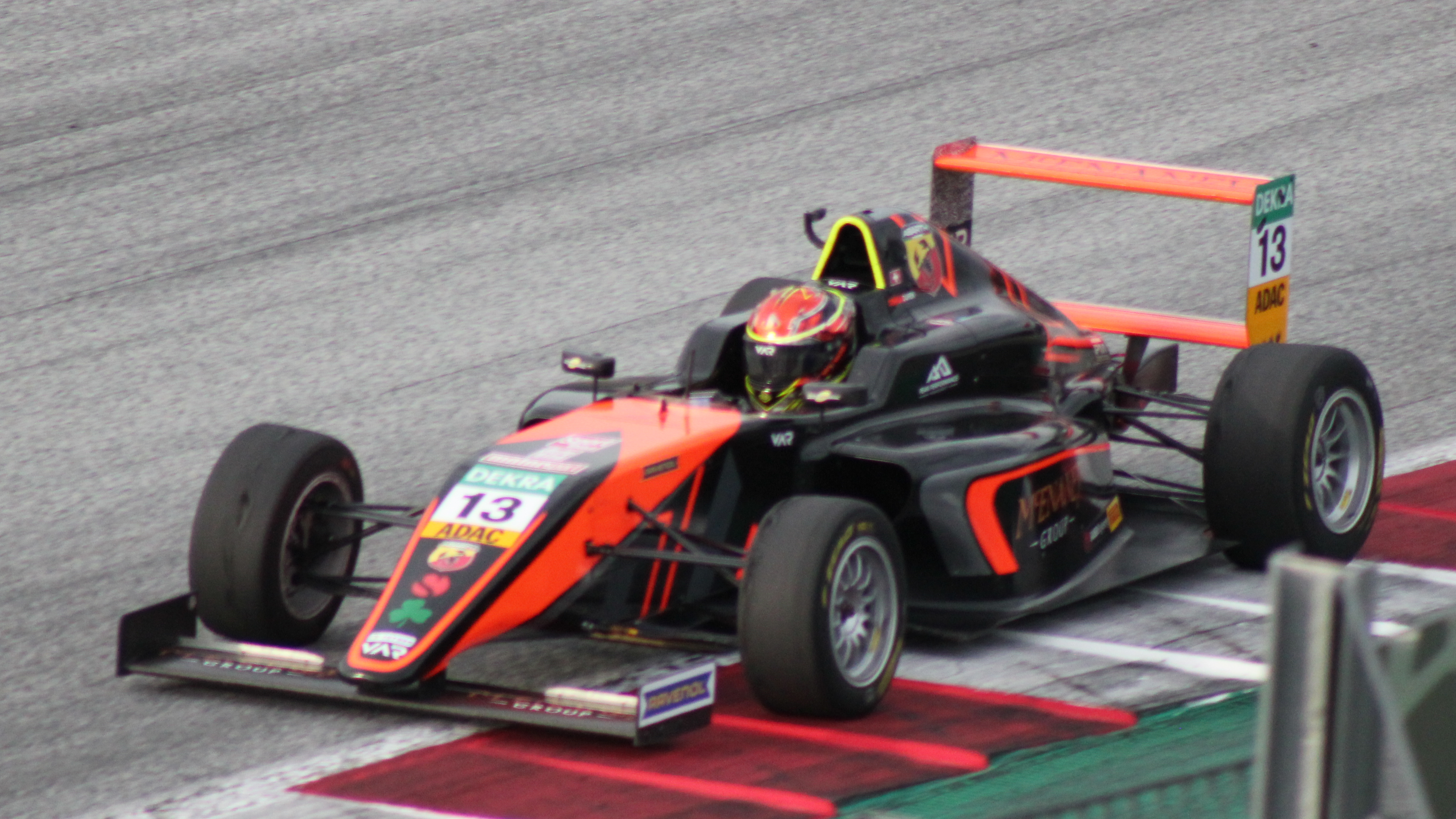
Dufek racing in the 2021 ADAC Formula 4 Championship at the Red Bull Ring.

In the German championship, Dufek would get his first podium in a VAR podium lockout in race 2 at Zandvoort, finishing second. Dufek then went on to have two further races in which he narrowly missed out on taking victory, losing out in back-to-back races at the Hockenheimring and Nürburgring to Luke Browning and Tim Tramnitz respectively. His ADAC F4 season also ended with him sat in seventh, having skipped the fourth round at the Sachsenring.

=== Formula Regional ===
==== 2022 ====
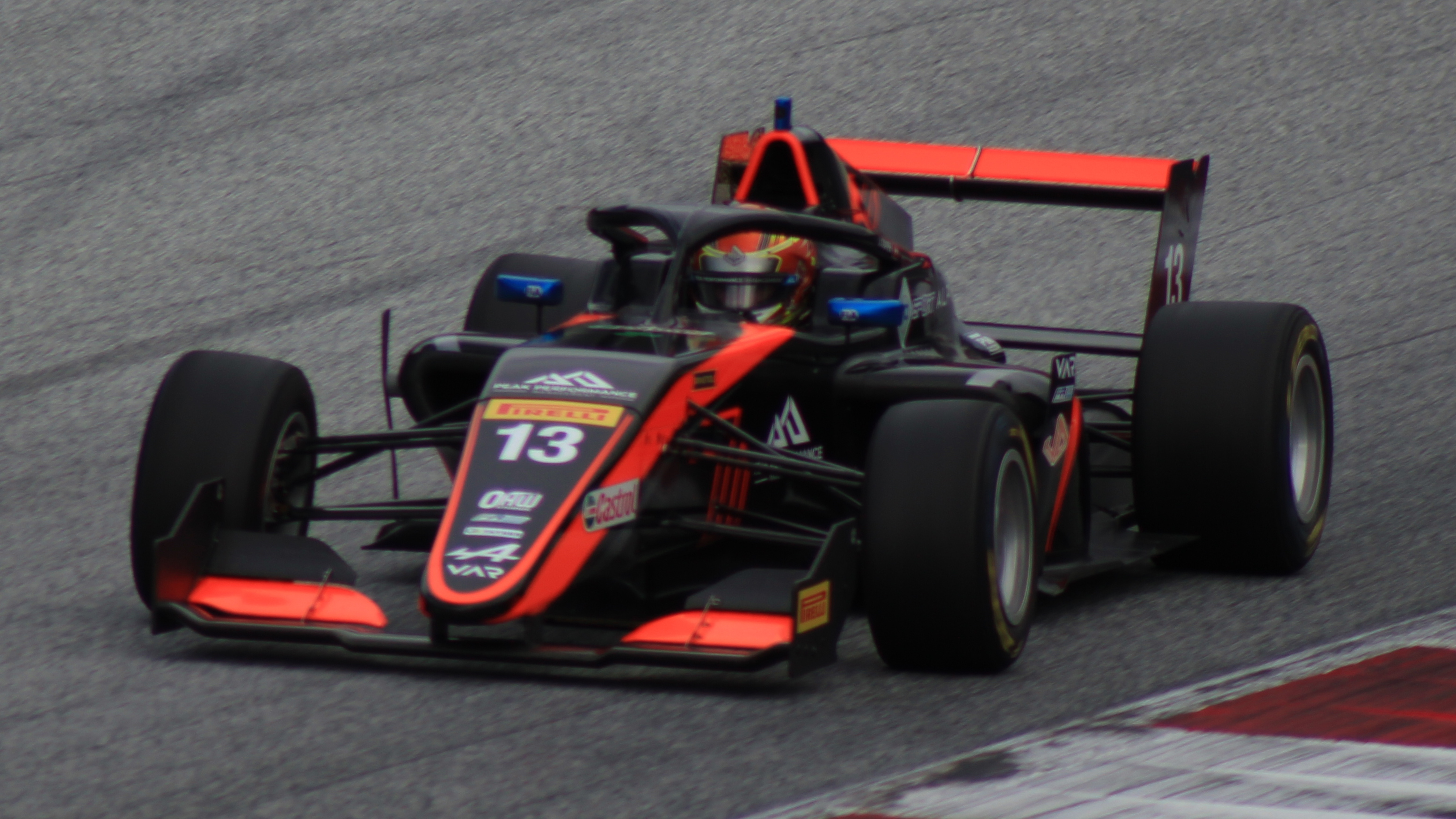
Dufek racing in the 2022 Formula Regional European Championship at the Red Bull Ring.

Having taken part in post-season testing with MP Motorsport and Van Amersfoort Racing at the end of 2021, Dufek signed for the latter team to compete in the Formula Regional European Championship, driving alongside Levente Révész and Kas Haverkort. Before the season, the Swiss driver competed in the first three rounds of the Formula Regional Asian series for Hitech Grand Prix, amassing two rookie podiums, ending 18th in the standings. The start to his campaign in the European championship would prove trickier, as Dufek scored just two points in the first ten races, far from teammate Haverkort. However, a sudden upturn in form at the Hungaroring round with strong points finishes, followed by a double podium at the Red Bull Ring after the summer break, propelled Dufek into the top-ten in the standings and rookie title contention. Dufek arrived at the season finale at Mugello tenth in the standings, 11 points off rookie leader Leonardo Fornaroli. He put pressure on the Italian with a podium in race one and a front row start in race two, but a late mistake fighting with Hadrien David saw him drop three positions and eventually miss out on the rookie championship by four points. This was, however, enough of a points haul for Dufek to leapfrog MP Motorsport's Mari Boya and secure ninth place in the final overall standings.

==== 2023 ====
At the start of 2023, Dufek raced in the 2023 Formula Regional Middle East Championship with PHM Racing. He would go on to take his first Formula Regional victory at Kuwait Motor Town, only to have it stripped away due to a technical irregularity. He finished the season sixth in the standings with two podiums to his name.

Dufek remained with Van Amersfoort Racing for the 2023 Formula Regional European Championship. Despite a maiden pole position at the Hungaroring, Dufek experienced a drop in speed due to what he described as a "recalcitrant engine", and opted to pull out of his contract during the summer break. He sat ninth in the standings at the time. By the end of the season, Dufek had dropped to 13th in the overall standings, having scored 52 points.

=== Euroformula Open ===
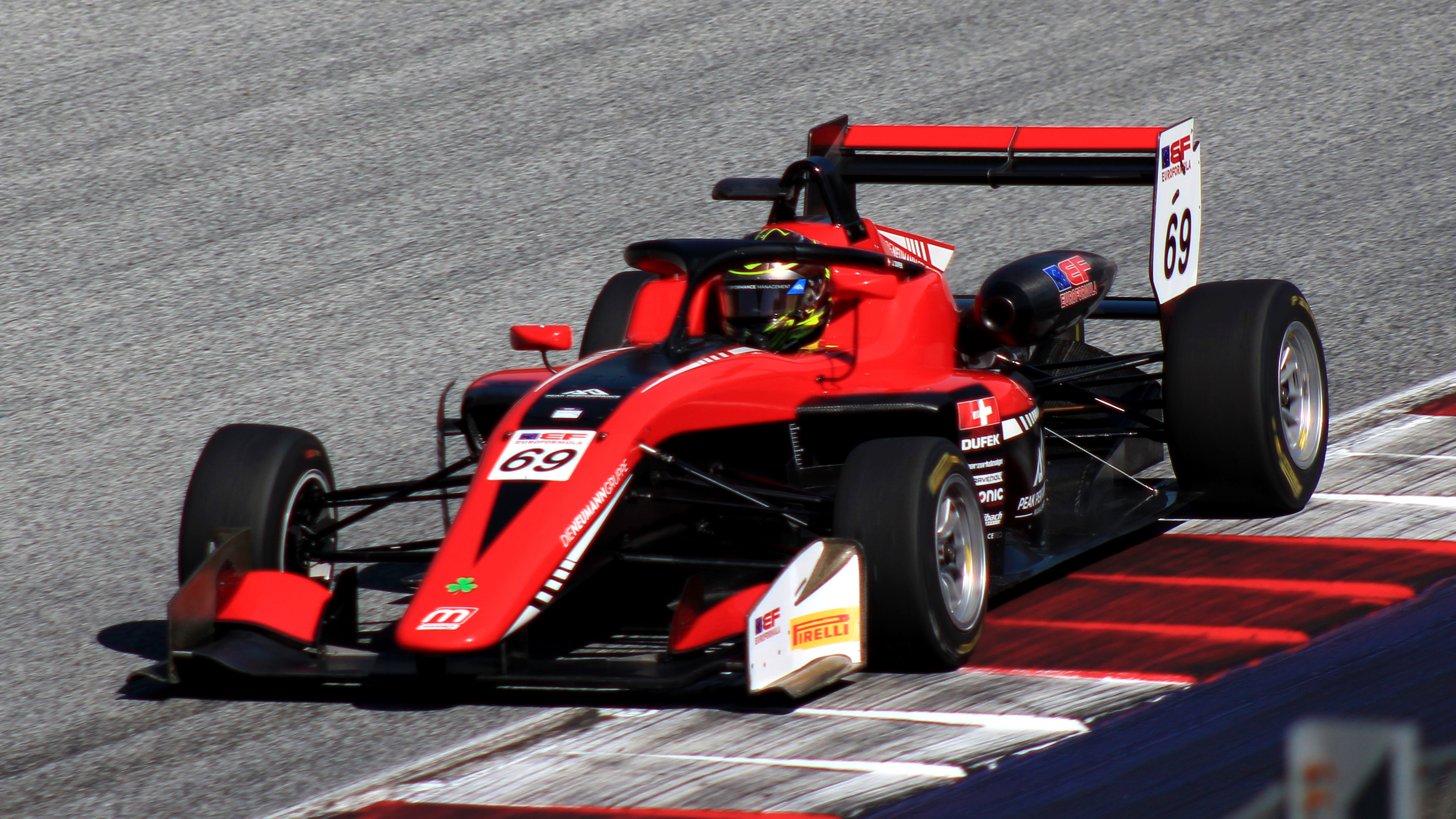
Dufek driving at the Red Bull Ring during the 2023 Euroformula Open

After leaving Formula Regional midway through 2023, Dufek joined the Euroformula Open with CryptoTower Racing Team starting from the fifth round at the Red Bull Ring. He scored a pair of podiums in his first round at the Red Bull Ring, before achieving a maiden win in Monza. He continued his podium streak in Mugello, making it seven rostrums in eight appearances, allowing him to place seventh in the overall standings.

=== FIA Formula 3 Championship ===
==== 2023 ====
Dufek was called up by Campos Racing for the final round of the 2023 FIA Formula 3 Championship at Monza, replacing Hugh Barter. After spinning out of qualifying, he finished 14th in both races, enough to propel him to 29th in the standings, ahead of six other drivers. He then tested for PHM Racing during the post-season test.

==== 2024 ====
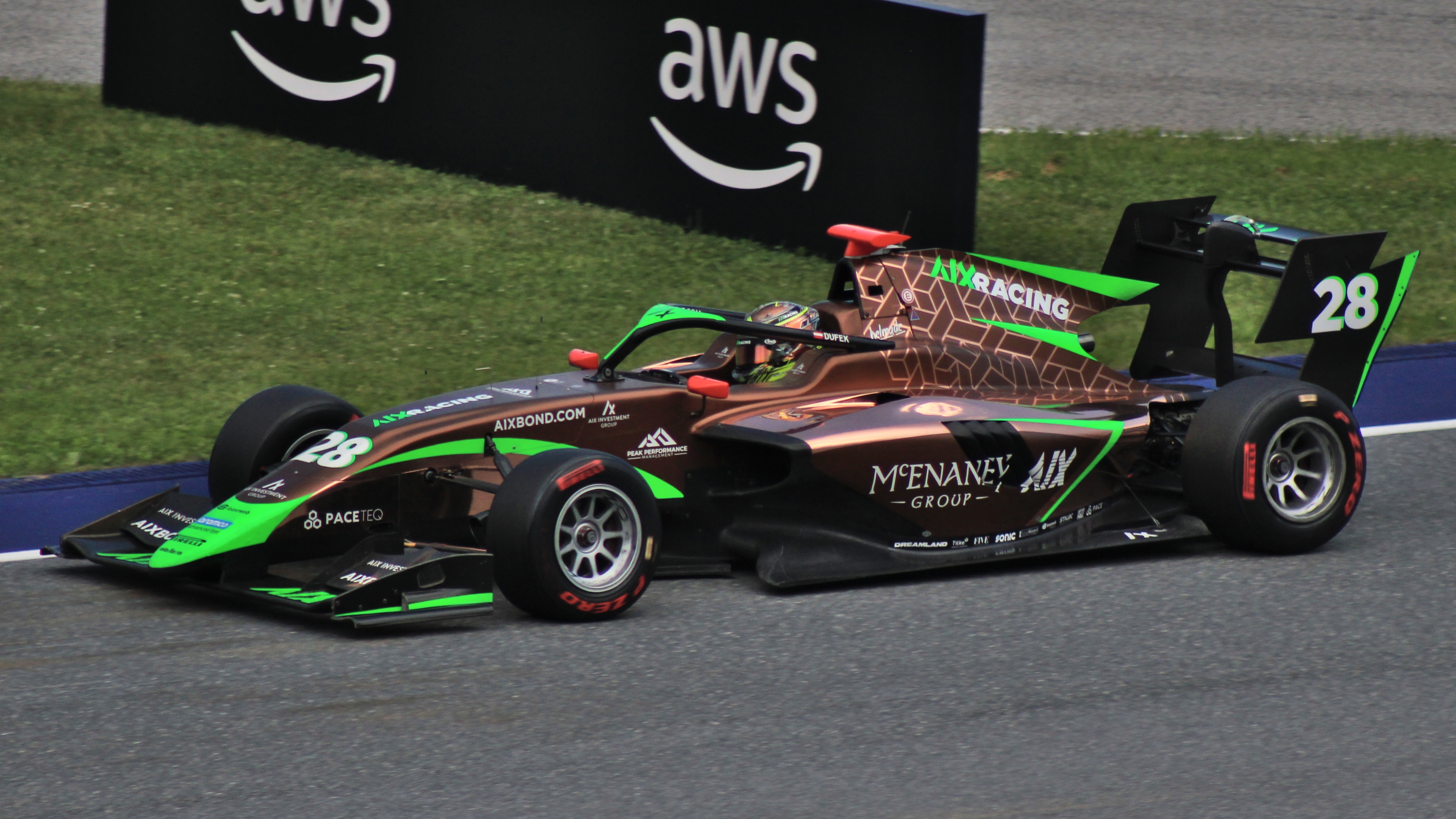
Dufek driving the Dallara F3 2019 during the 2024 Spielberg Formula 3 round.

For 2024, Dufek stepped up to FIA Formula 3 full-time, joining PHM AIX Racing for his first full Formula 3 season. It would be a difficult season for Dufek, often fighting towards the rear of the field. However, he had a standout qualifying in Hungary with sixth, only for him to be disqualified for being below the minimum weight. His sole point came in the season finale in the Monza feature race, classifying tenth after post-race penalties. Dufek was ranked 28th in the standings, behind teammates Tasanapol Inthraphuvasak and Nikita Bedrin.

==== 2025 ====
Dufek continued in Formula 3 for a second season in 2025, switching to Hitech TGR alongside Martinius Stenshorne and Gerrard Xie. Having failed to score points during the first four rounds, Dufek departed the team following the Monaco round due to budget issues, and was replaced by Jesse Carrasquedo Jr.

=== Formula One ===
At the start of 2019, Dufek joined the Sauber Junior Team along with Dexter Patterson and competed with their karting team in the CIK-FIA Karting European Championship and the Karting World Championship. He left the academy before the start of his single-seater career in 2020.

== Personal life ==
Dufek was born to a German and Austrian father, and a British mother in London. He lives in Geneva, Switzerland.

== Karting record ==
=== Karting career summary ===
Season	Series	Team	Position
2013	LO Schweizer Kart Meisterschaft — Mini	JD Racing Team	1st
2013	ACV German Vega Trophy		1st
2014	LO Schweizer Kart Meisterschaft — Super Mini	JD Racing Team	7th
2015	WSK Final Cup — 60 Mini	Spirit Racing	NC
2017	ADAC Kart Masters — X30 Junior		4th
2017	IAME Euro Series — X30 Junior		10th
2017	CIK-FIA World Championship — OKJ	Birel Art Racing Srl	73rd
2017	IAME International Final — X30 Junior		NC
2018	WSK Champions Cup — OKJ	Forza Racing	17th
2018	South Garda Winter Cup — OKJ	Forza Racing	44th
2018	German Karting Championship — Junior	Forza Racing	19th
2018	WSK Super Master Series — OKJ	Forza Racing	12th
2018	WSK Open Cup — OKJ	Forza Racing	34th
2018	CIK-FIA European Championship — OKJ	Forza Racing	19th
2018	CIK-FIA World Championship — OKJ	Forza Racing	21st
2018	IAME International Final — X30 Junior	Forza Racing	117th
2018	WSK Final Cup — OKJ	Forza Racing	37th
2019	Italian Championship — OK		5th
2019	WSK Super Master Series — OK	KR Motorsport	21st
2019	Championnat de France — OK		8th
2019	WSK Euro Series — OK	Sauber Karting Team	9th
2019	CIK-FIA European Championship — OK	Sauber Karting Team	20th
2019	CIK-FIA World Championship — OK	Sauber Karting Team	16th
2019	WSK Final Cup — OK	Sauber Karting Team	NC

== Racing record ==
=== Racing career summary ===
Season	Series	Team	Races	Wins	Poles	F/Laps	Podiums	Points	Position
2020	F4 Spanish Championship	MP Motorsport	21	0	1	1	8	187	4th
2021	ADAC Formula 4 Championship	Van Amersfoort Racing	18	0	0	0	4	127	7th
2021	Italian F4 Championship	Van Amersfoort Racing	21	1	3	2	5	154	7th
2021	FIA Central European Zone Formula 4	Van Amersfoort Racing	2	1	1	1	1	25	7th
2022	Formula Regional Asian Championship	Hitech Grand Prix	9	0	0	0	0	12	18th
2022	Formula Regional European Championship	Van Amersfoort Racing	19	0	0	0	3	79	9th
2023	Formula Regional Middle East Championship	PHM Racing	15	0	0	3	2	105	6th
2023	Formula Regional European Championship	Van Amersfoort Racing	12	0	1	0	0	52	13th
2023	FIA Formula 3 Championship	Campos Racing	2	0	0	0	0	0	29th
2023	Euroformula Open Championship	CryptoTower Racing Team	8	1	0	0	7	138	7th
2024	FIA Formula 3 Championship	PHM AIX Racing; AIX Racing	20	0	0	0	0	1	28th
2025	FIA Formula 3 Championship	Hitech TGR	8	0	0	0	0	0	30th

* Season still in progress.

=== Complete F4 Spanish Championship results ===
(key) (Races in bold indicate pole position) (Races in italics indicate fastest lap)

Year	Team	1	2	3	4	5	6	7	8	9	10	11	12	13	14	15	16	17	18	19	20	21	DC	Points
2020	MP Motorsport	NAV; 1; 11	NAV; 2; 7	**NAV**; **3**; 3	LEC; 1 Ret	LEC; 2; 6	LEC; 3; 5	JER; 1; 3	JER; 2; 3	JER; 3; 5	CRT; 1; 2	CRT; 2; 2	CRT; 3 Ret	ARA; 1; 3	ARA; 2; 4	ARA; 3; 10	JAR; 1; 2	JAR; 2; 2	JAR; 3; 5	CAT; 1; 4	CAT; 2; 6	CAT; 3; 4	4th	187

=== Complete ADAC Formula 4 Championship results ===
(key) (Races in bold indicate pole position) (Races in italics indicate fastest lap)

Year	Team	1	2	3	4	5	6	7	8	9	10	11	12	13	14	15	16	17	18	Pos	Points
2021	Van Amersfoort Racing	RBR; 1; 11	RBR; 2; 4	RBR; 3 Ret	ZAN; 1; 8	ZAN; 2; 2	ZAN; 3; 7	HOC1; 1 Ret	HOC1; 2; 5	HOC1; 3; 8	SAC; 1	SAC; 2	SAC; 3	HOC2; 1; 4	HOC2; 2; 7	HOC2; 3; 2	NÜR; 1; 2	NÜR; 2; 3	NÜR; 3; 12	7th	127

=== Complete Italian F4 Championship results ===
(key) (Races in bold indicate pole position) (Races in italics indicate fastest lap)

Year	Team	1	2	3	4	5	6	7	8	9	10	11	12	13	14	15	16	17	18	19	20	21	Pos	Points
2021	Van Amersfoort Racing	LEC; 1; 9	LEC; 2; 22	LEC; 3; 8	MIS; 1; 28†	MIS; 2; 9	MIS; 3; 6	VLL; 1; 5	VLL; 2; 3	VLL; 3; 10	IMO; 1; 3	IMO; 2; 6	IMO; 3; 4	RBR; 1; 5	RBR; 2 Ret	RBR; 3; 2	**MUG**; **1**; 2	**MUG**; **2**; 1	**MUG**; **3** Ret	MNZ; 1; 22	MNZ; 2; 9	MNZ; 3; 8	7th	154

=== Complete Formula Regional Asian Championship results ===
(key) (Races in bold indicate pole position) (Races in italics indicate the fastest lap of top ten finishers)

Year	Team	1	2	3	4	5	6	7	8	9	10	11	12	13	14	15	Pos	Points
2022	Hitech Grand Prix	ABU; 1; 9	ABU; 2; 6	ABU; 3; 16	DUB; 1; 12	DUB; 2; 16	DUB; 3; 10	DUB; 1; 16	DUB; 2; 27†	DUB; 3; 10	DUB; 1	DUB; 2	DUB; 3	ABU; 1	ABU; 2	ABU; 3	18th	12

=== Complete Formula Regional European Championship results ===
(key) (Races in bold indicate pole position) (Races in italics indicate fastest lap)

Year	Team	1	2	3	4	5	6	7	8	9	10	11	12	13	14	15	16	17	18	19	20	Pos	Points
2022	Van Amersfoort Racing	MNZ; 1; 18	MNZ; 2; 13	IMO; 1; 12	IMO; 2; 10	MCO; 1 DNQ	MCO; 2; 22	LEC; 1 Ret	LEC; 2; 25	ZAN; 1; 23	ZAN; 2; 10	HUN; 1; 5	HUN; 2; 6	SPA; 1; 10	SPA; 2; 21	RBR; 1; 2	RBR; 2; 3	CAT; 1; 8	CAT; 2 Ret	MUG; 1; 3	MUG; 2; 7	9th	79
2023	Van Amersfoort Racing	IMO; 1; 8	IMO; 2 Ret	CAT; 1; 6	CAT; 2; 5	HUN; 1; 6	**HUN**; **2**; 4	SPA; 1; 14	SPA; 2; 21	MUG; 1; 5	MUG; 2; 25	LEC; 1; 23	LEC; 2; 20	RBR; 1	RBR; 2	MNZ; 1	MNZ; 2	ZAN; 1	ZAN; 2	HOC; 1	HOC; 2	13th	52

=== Complete Formula Regional Middle East Championship results ===
(key) (Races in bold indicate pole position) (Races in italics indicate fastest lap)

Year	Entrant	1	2	3	4	5	6	7	8	9	10	11	12	13	14	15	DC	Points
2023	PHM Racing	DUB1; 1; 6	DUB1; 2; 16	DUB1; 3; 13	KUW1; 1; 3	KUW1; 2 DSQ	KUW1; 3; 10	KUW2; 1; 9	KUW2; 2; 7	KUW2; 3; 7	DUB2; 1; 4	DUB2; 2; 6	DUB2; 3; 3	ABU; 1; 5	ABU; 2; 4	ABU; 3; 5	6th	105

=== Complete Euroformula Open Championship results ===
(key) (Races in bold indicate pole position) (Races in italics indicate fastest lap)

Year	Team	1	2	3	4	5	6	7	8	9	10	11	12	13	14	15	16	17	18	19	20	21	22	23	Pos	Points
2023	CryptoTower Racing Team	PRT; 1	PRT; 2	PRT; 3	SPA; 1	SPA; 2	SPA; 3	HUN; 1	HUN; 2	HUN; 3	LEC; 1	LEC; 2	LEC; 3	RBR; 1; 3	RBR; 2; 4	RBR; 3; 3	MNZ; 1; 2	MNZ; 2; 2	MNZ; 3; 1	MUG; 1; 3	MUG; 2; 2	CAT; 1	CAT; 2	CAT; 3	7th	138

=== Complete FIA Formula 3 Championship results ===
(key) (Races in bold indicate pole position) (Races in italics indicate fastest lap)

Year	Entrant	1	2	3	4	5	6	7	8	9	10	11	12	13	14	15	16	17	18	19	20	DC	Points
2023	Campos Racing	BHR; SPR	BHR; FEA	MEL; SPR	MEL; FEA	MON; SPR	MON; FEA	CAT; SPR	CAT; FEA	RBR; SPR	RBR; FEA	SIL; SPR	SIL; FEA	HUN; SPR	HUN; FEA	SPA; SPR	SPA; FEA	MNZ; SPR; 14	MNZ; FEA; 14			29th	0
2024	PHM AIX Racing AIX Racing	BHR; SPR; 24	BHR; FEA; 27	MEL; SPR; 22	MEL; FEA; 22	IMO; SPR; 16	IMO; FEA; 22	MON; SPR; Ret	MON; FEA; 20	CAT; SPR; 17	CAT; FEA; 17	RBR; SPR; 25	RBR; FEA; Ret	SIL; SPR; 23	SIL; FEA; Ret	HUN; SPR; 22	HUN; FEA; 22	SPA; SPR; 24	SPA; FEA; 14	MNZ; SPR; Ret	MNZ; FEA; 10	28th	1
2025	Hitech TGR	MEL; SPR; 22	MEL; FEA; 11	BHR; SPR; Ret	BHR; FEA; 22	IMO; SPR; 14	IMO; FEA; 15	MON; SPR; 14	MON; FEA; 17	CAT; SPR	CAT; FEA	RBR; SPR	RBR; FEA	SIL; SPR	SIL; FEA	SPA; SPR	SPA; FEA	HUN; SPR	HUN; FEA	MNZ; SPR	MNZ; FEA	30th	0
