= Filip Ugran =

Romanian racing driver

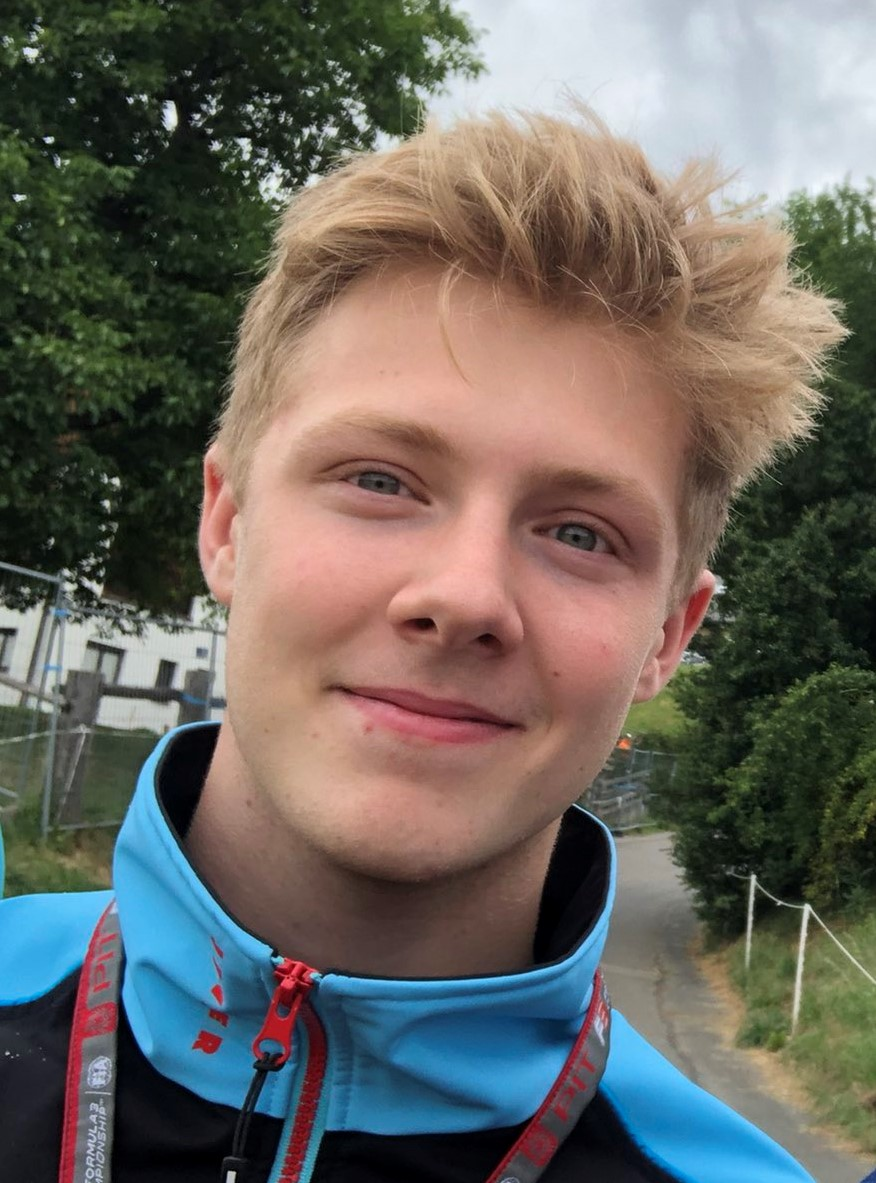
- Ugran during the 2021 Spielberg Formula 3 round.
- Nationality: (Romania) Romanian
- Born: 12 September 2002 (age 24) Târgu Mureș, Romania

Porsche Supercup career
- Debut season: 2026
- Current team: Ombra Racing
- Categorisation: FIA Silver (2022–2024); FIA Gold (2025–)
- Car number: 20
- Starts: 7
- Wins: 0
- Podiums: 0
- Poles: 0
- Fastest laps: 0
- Best finish: 18th in 2026

Previous series
- 2025 2024 2023 2022, 2024 2022 2021–2022 2019-2020 2019-2020 2019: International GT Open; Porsche Sprint Challenge Southern Europe; FIA World Endurance Championship; European Le Mans Series; Euroformula Open Championship; FIA Formula 3 Italian F4 Championship; F4 Spanish Championship; ADAC Formula 4

Filip-Ioan Ugran (born 12 September 2002) is a Romanian race car driver who is set to compete in the Italian GT Championship for Ceccato Racing and the Porsche Supercup for Ombra Racing. He previously competed in the International GT Open with Oregon Team.

Ugran has raced in the FIA Formula 3 Championship, and is a race winner in the Italian and Spanish Formula 4 championships.

== Early career ==
=== Karting ===
Ugran made his motorsport debut in karting in 2016, where he remained active until 2018. He took part in championships such as the WSK Super Master Series, WSK Final Cup and the CIK-FIA International Super Cup. He also raced in the 2016 edition of the CIK-FIA Karting Academy Trophy, where he finished 38th and the 2017 WeisBlau Championship, which he won.

=== Lower formulae ===
==== 2019 ====
In 2019, Ugran made his debut in formula racing in the Italian F4 Championship with BVM Racing. He was the only driver in the team to drive the entire season, making for a difficult debut year. Only with a tenth place in the season finale at the Monza did he manage to score a point, putting him in 26th place in the standings. He also drove as a guest driver for BVM in a race weekend of the ADAC Formula 4 Championship at the Hockenheimring, where he finished 14th in both races. At the end of the year, Ugran drove in the season finale of the F4 Spanish Championship at the Circuit de Barcelona-Catalunya with Jenzer Motorsport. He finished on the podium in all races, with two second places and one third place, but because he was a guest driver, he was not awarded any championship points.

==== 2020 ====
In 2020, Ugran remained active in Italian F4, switching to Jenzer Motorsport. His results improved significantly, and he scored his first win during the second round at the Imola Circuit. He missed the third round at the Red Bull Ring but was back on the podium during the next round in Mugello. He collected one more podium during the next round at Monza. Ugran was on the podium a total of five times during the season, which led to him finishing eighth in the standings with 133 points. He also drove for Jenzer in the Spanish F4 race weekend at Le Castellet, where he won two races and finished second in the third. With 55 points, he finished tenth in the standings despite competing in only that one weekend.

=== FIA Formula 3 Championship ===
==== 2021 ====
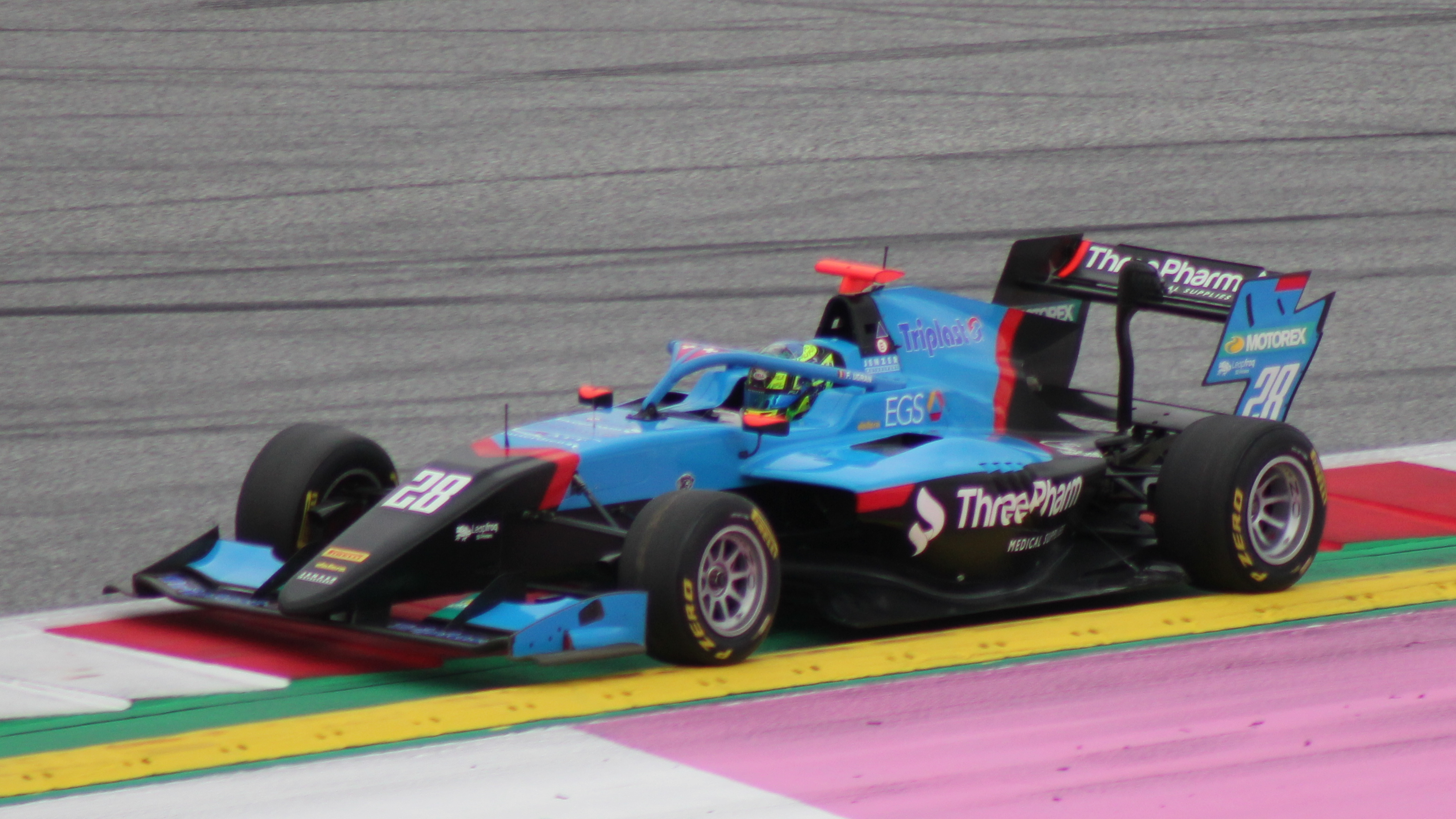
Ugran driving for Jenzer Motorsport at the Red Bull Ring.

For the 2021 season, Ugran remained with Jenzer Motorsport but progressed to the FIA Formula 3 Championship, where he partnered Calan Williams. At the first round in Barcelona, the Romanian found himself fighting for positions in the lower midfield, and issues with tyre management in France as well as troubles with track limits at Spielberg left Ugran bottom of the standings after the opening third of the season, with the best race result of 21st place. Ugran managed to achieve a then-best finish of 19th in race two in Budapest and Spa-Francorchamps, allowing Ugran to move off the bottom of the table. At the penultimate round in Zandvoort, Ugran qualified a season-best 21st and finished 15th in race one, bettering his previous best finishing position by four places. In the second race, Ugran managed to end up in 12th at the checkered flag but was demoted to 24th after the race stewards found him guilty of a collision with Jonny Edgar. Ugran did not score points in the final weekend at Sochi. Ugran finished 31st in the drivers' standings, the second-lowest of all full-timers.

==== 2022 ====
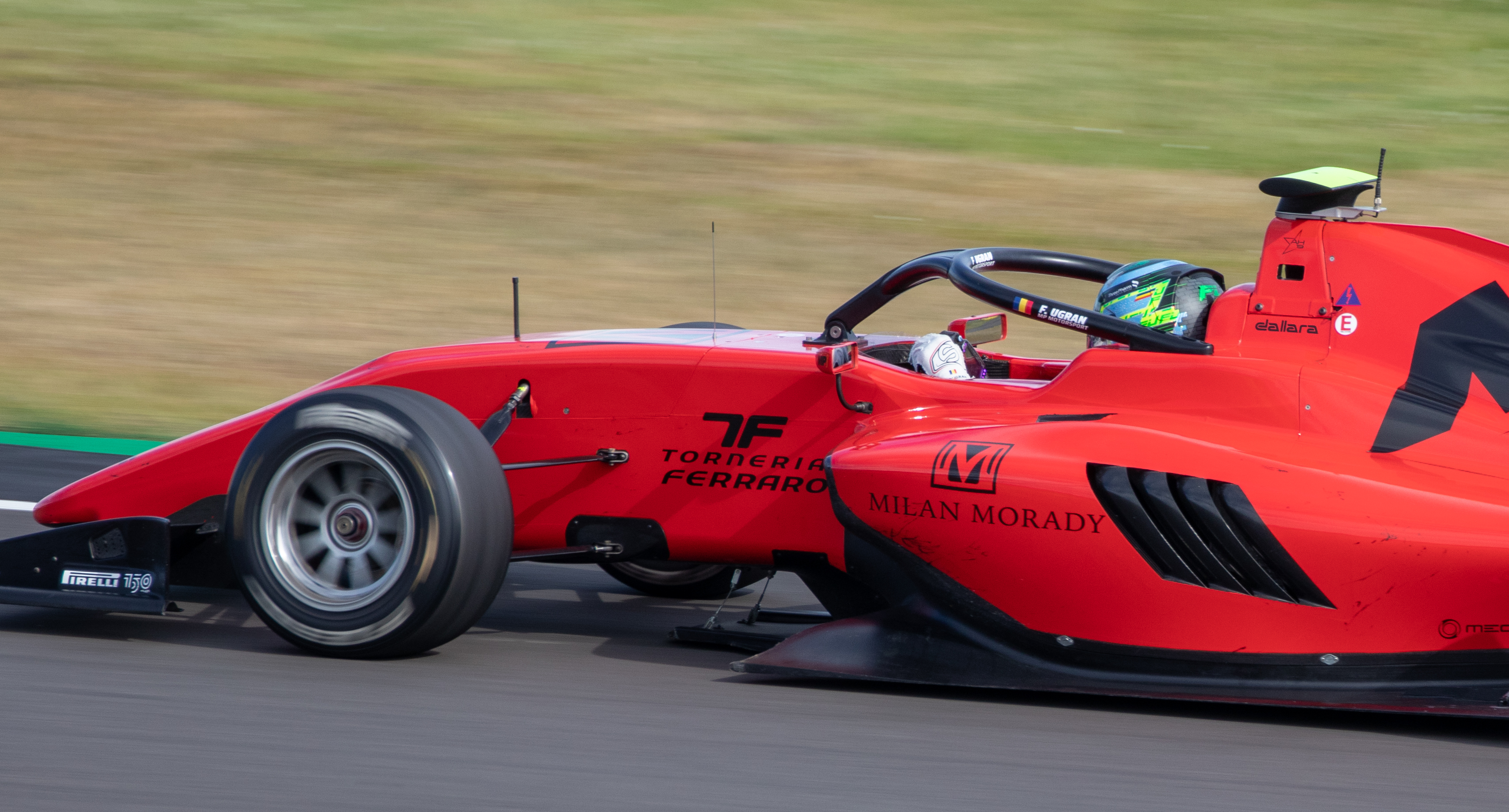
Ugran driving for MP Motorsport during his one-off return in the 2022 Silverstone Formula 3 round.

Ugran drove for Jenzer Motorsport, Charouz Racing System and Van Amersfoort Racing during 2021 post-season testing. However, he was not selected for any team and left the series.

Ugran returned to Formula 3 for the Silverstone round of the championship, replacing Alexander Smolyar, who could not race in the United Kingdom due to Visa issues. He finished his races 23rd and 18th, before handing his seat back to Smolyar for the Spielberg round. Ugran ended the year 36th in the standings.

=== Euroformula Open Championship ===
Ugran moved to the Euroformula Open Championship in 2022, signing for Van Amersfoort Racing. Ugran did manage one podium during the season, where he placed third in the Paul Ricard round. However, after four rounds into the season, Van Amersfoort Racing left Euroformula Open with immediate effect, leaving Ugran without a seat. This left him to end ninth in the standings.

== Sportscar career ==
=== 2022: Endurance debut ===
After being left without a drive after the 2022 Euroformula Open Championship, Ugran joined the 2022 European Le Mans Series with Algarve Pro Racing alongside Bent Viscaal for the remaining two rounds of the campaign. Ugran ended both rounds in eighth and fifth place.

=== 2023: First FIA WEC season ===
Ugran's 2023 campaign would be in the FIA World Endurance Championship with Prema Racing in the LMP2 category, driving alongside Bent Viscaal and Andrea Caldarelli. The season began without much promise at the 1000 Miles of Sebring, where early contact left them eighth at the chequered flag. The second round in Portimão was better, as Ugran contributed to a recovery drive for fifth place. Ugran had his best finish in Spa-Francorchamps, making a great start en route to fourth place, although Caldarelli was passed on older tyres while running in third.

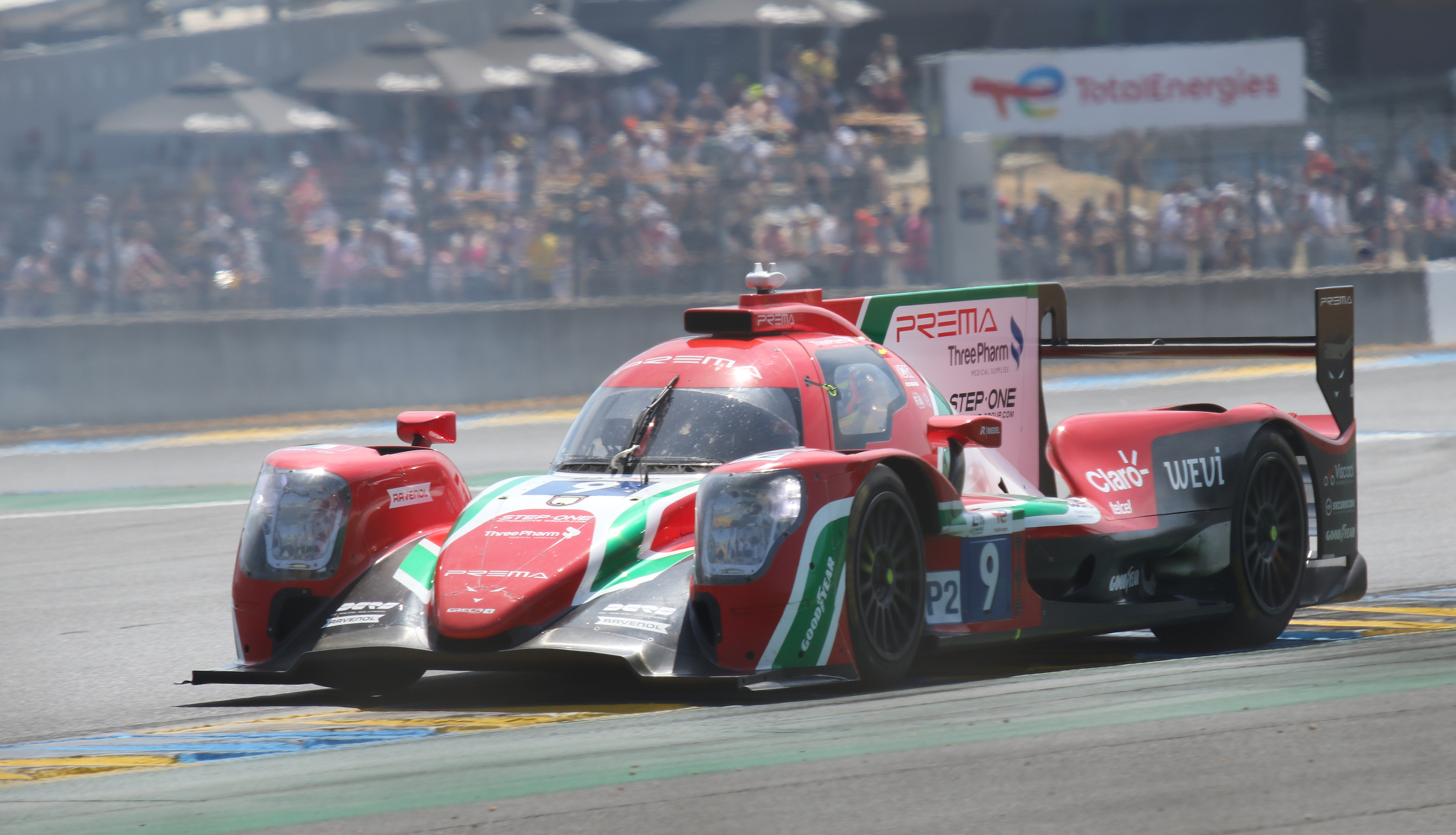
The No. 9 Oreca 07 that Ugran drove during the 24 Hours of Le Mans

Urgan had a complicated race during his Le Mans debut, getting stuck in a runoff area and later being hit from behind which caused damage and a lengthy thirty-minute repair in the pits. They eventually brought it home to finish tenth. After ninth and eighth in Monza and Fuji respectively, a successful stint by Viscaal in Bahrain meant Ugran would get another fourth place finish. Ugran finished his rookie season of WEC in tenth overall, with 57 points.

=== 2024: Switch to United ===
For the 2024 season, Ugran moved to United Autosports, partnering Ben Hanley and Marino Sato in the European Le Mans Series. He started the season with his first endurance racing podium with third place at the 4 Hours of Barcelona. This was followed by a fifth place the next round for the 4 Hours of Le Castellet. However, the No. 22 car's results' dipped after that, as they were only able to score points two more times with a ninth and tenth place. Ugran finished the campaign tenth in the standings with 29 points.

=== 2025: International GT Open debut ===
In 2025, Ugran raced exclusively in the International GT Open with Oregon Team alongside Robin Rogalski in the No. 19 car.

== Karting record ==
=== Karting career summary ===
Season	Series	Team	Position
2016	South Garda Winter Cup — OKJ	R&R Racing Team	32nd
2016	Andrea Margutti Trophy — OKJ	R&R Racing Team	14th
2016	WSK Super Master Series — OKJ	R&R Racing Team	77th
2016	CIK-FIA Karting Academy Trophy	Ugran, Claudiu	38th
2017	South Garda Winter Cup — OK	R&R Racing Team	NC
2017	WSK Super Master Series — OK	R&R Racing Team	62nd
2017	Andrea Margutti Trophy — OK	R&R Racing Team	25th
2017	CIK-FIA International Super Cup — KZ2	R&R Racing Team	89th
2017	WeisBlau Championship — KZ2	KSM Schumacher Racing Team	**1st**
2018	WSK Champions Cup — KZ2	R&R Racing Team	21st
2018	South Garda Winter Cup — KZ2	R&R Racing Team	91st
2018	WSK Super Master Series — KZ2	R&R Racing Team	46th
2018	WSK Euro Series — KZ2	R&R Racing Team	44th
2018	WSK Open Cup — KZ2	R&R Racing Team	27th
2018	CIK-FIA International Super Cup — KZ2	R&R Racing Team	78th
2018	SKUSA SuperNationals — KZ	R&R Racing Team	15th
2018	WSK Final Cup — KZ2	R&R Racing Team	26th

=== Complete CIK-FIA Karting Academy Trophy results ===
(key) (Races in bold indicate pole position) (Races in italics indicate fastest lap)

Year	Entrant	1	2	3	4	5	6	DC	Points
2016	Ugran, Claudiu	ESS; QH; 31	ESS; R 25	PRT; QH; 38	PRT; R DNQ	KRI; QH; 28	KRI; R 28	38th	0

== Racing record ==
=== Racing career summary ===
Season	Series	Team	Races	Wins	Poles	F/Laps	Podiums	Points	Position
2019	Italian F4 Championship	BVM Racing	21	0	0	0	0	1	26th
2019	ADAC F4 Championship	BVM Racing	2	0	0	0	0	0	NC†
2019	F4 Spanish Championship	Jenzer Motorsport	3	0	0	0	3	0	NC†
2020	Italian F4 Championship	Jenzer Motorsport	17	1	0	2	5	133	8th
2020	F4 Spanish Championship	Jenzer Motorsport	3	2	2	1	3	55	10th
2021	FIA Formula 3 Championship	Jenzer Motorsport	20	0	0	0	0	0	31st
2022	Euroformula Open Championship	Van Amersfoort Racing	11	0	0	1	1	92	9th
2022	FIA Formula 3 Championship	MP Motorsport	2	0	0	0	0	0	36th
2022	European Le Mans Series - LMP2	Algarve Pro Racing	2	0	0	0	0	14	17th
2023	FIA World Endurance Championship - LMP2	Prema Racing	7	0	0	0	0	57	10th
2023	24 Hours of Le Mans - LMP2	Prema Racing	1	0	0	0	0	N/A	16th
2024	European Le Mans Series - LMP2	United Autosports	6	0	0	1	1	29	10th
2024	Porsche Sprint Challenge Southern Europe - Pro	Ombra Racing	4	0	0	0	0	27	17th
2025	International GT Open	Oregon Team	5	0	0	0	0	0	58th
2026	Italian GT Championship Endurance Cup - GT3	BMW Italia Ceccato Racing	4	1	0	0	2	46	4th
2026	Porsche Supercup	Ombra Racing	7	0	0	0	0	9	18th
2026	Porsche Carrera Cup Italy	Ombra Racing	2	0	0	0	0	1	32nd

^{†} As Ugran was a guest driver, he was ineligible to score points.
^{*} Season still in progress.

=== Complete ADAC Formula 4 Championship results ===
(key) (Races in bold indicate pole position) (Races in italics indicate fastest lap)

Year	Team	1	2	3	4	5	6	7	8	9	10	11	12	13	14	15	16	17	18	19	20	Pos	Points
2019	BVM Racing	OSC; 1	OSC; 2	OSC; 3	RBR; 1	RBR; 2	RBR; 3	HOC; 1; 14	HOC; 2; 14	ZAN; 1	ZAN; 2	ZAN; 3	NÜR; 1	NÜR; 2	NÜR; 3	HOC; 1	HOC; 2	HOC; 3	SAC; 1	SAC; 2	SAC; 3	NC†	0

^{†} As Ugran was a guest driver, he was ineligible to score points.

=== Complete Italian F4 Championship results ===
(key) (Races in bold indicate pole position) (Races in italics indicate fastest lap)

Year	Team	1	2	3	4	5	6	7	8	9	10	11	12	13	14	15	16	17	18	19	20	21	22	Pos	Points
2019	BVM Racing	VLL; 1; 26	VLL; 2; 18	VLL; 3; 18	MIS; 1; 16	MIS; 2; 27	MIS; 3 C	HUN; 1; 24	HUN; 2; 18	HUN; 3; 17	RBR; 1; 27	RBR; 2; 18	RBR; 3; 18	IMO; 1; 13	IMO; 2; 26	IMO; 3; 17	IMO; 4; 11	MUG; 1 Ret	MUG; 2; 21	MUG; 3; 22	MNZ; 1; 12	MNZ; 2; 18	MNZ; 3; 10	26th	1
2020	Jenzer Motorsport	MIS; 1; 3	MIS; 2; 2	MIS; 3; 4	IMO1; 1; 1	IMO1; 2; 6	IMO1; 3 Ret	RBR; 1 DNA	RBR; 2 DNA	RBR; 3 DNA	MUG; 1; 3	MUG; 2; 6	MUG; 3; 11	MNZ; 1; 3	MNZ; 2 Ret	MNZ; 3; 8	IMO2; 1; 12	IMO2; 2; 7	IMO2; 3; 10	VLL; 1; 14	VLL; 2 C	VLL; 3; 7		8th	133

=== Complete F4 Spanish Championship results ===
(key) (Races in bold indicate pole position) (Races in italics indicate fastest lap)

Year	Team	1	2	3	4	5	6	7	8	9	10	11	12	13	14	15	16	17	18	19	20	21	DC	Points
2019	Jenzer Motorsport	NAV; 1	NAV; 2	NAV; 3	LEC; 1	LEC; 2	LEC; 3	ARA; 1	ARA; 2	ARA; 3	CRT; 1	CRT; 2	CRT; 3	JER; 1	JER; 2	JER; 3	ALG; 1	ALG; 2	ALG; 3	CAT; 1; 2	CAT; 2; 2	CAT; 3; 3	NC†	0
2020	Jenzer Motorsport	NAV; 1	NAV; 2	NAV; 3	**LEC**; **1**; 1	**LEC**; **2**; 1	LEC; 3; 2	JER; 1	JER; 2	JER; 3	CRT; 1	CRT; 2	CRT; 3	ARA; 1	ARA; 2	ARA; 3	JAR; 1	JAR; 2	JAR; 3	CAT; 1	CAT; 2	CAT; 3	10th	55

^{†} As Ugran was a guest driver, he was ineligible to score points.

=== Complete FIA Formula 3 Championship results ===
(key) (Races in bold indicate pole position; races in italics indicate points for the fastest lap of top ten finishers)

Year	Entrant	1	2	3	4	5	6	7	8	9	10	11	12	13	14	15	16	17	18	19	20	21	DC	Points
2021	Jenzer Motorsport	CAT; 1; 25	CAT; 2; 21	CAT; 3; 27	LEC; 1; 23	LEC; 2; 28	LEC; 3; 26	RBR; 1; 24	RBR; 2; 22	RBR; 3; 23	HUN; 1; 25	HUN; 2; 19	HUN; 3; 22	SPA; 1; 28†	SPA; 2; 19	SPA; 3; 25	ZAN; 1; 15	ZAN; 2; 24	ZAN; 3; 19	SOC; 1; 25	SOC; 2 C	SOC; 3; 19	31st	0
2022	MP Motorsport	BHR; SPR	BHR; FEA	IMO; SPR	IMO; FEA	CAT; SPR	CAT; FEA	SIL; SPR; 23	SIL; FEA; 18	RBR; SPR	RBR; FEA	HUN; SPR	HUN; FEA	SPA; SPR	SPA; FEA	ZAN; SPR	ZAN; FEA	MNZ; SPR	MNZ; FEA				36th	0

^{†} Driver did not finish the race, but was classified as they completed more than 90% of the race distance.

=== Complete Euroformula Open Championship results ===
(key) (Races in bold indicate pole position) (Races in italics indicate fastest lap)

Year	Team	1	2	3	4	5	6	7	8	9	10	11	12	13	14	15	16	17	18	19	20	21	22	23	24	25	26	Pos	Points
2022	Van Amersfoort Racing	EST; 1 Ret	EST; 2; 7*	EST; 3; 7	PAU; 1; 5	PAU; 2; 4	LEC; 1; 3	LEC; 2; 5	LEC; 3; 6	SPA; 1; 8	SPA; 2; 8	SPA; 3; 5	HUN; 1	HUN; 2	HUN; 3	IMO; 1	IMO; 2	IMO; 3	RBR; 1	RBR; 2	RBR; 3	MNZ; 1	MNZ; 2	MNZ; 3	CAT; 1	CAT; 2	CAT; 3	9th	92

=== Complete European Le Mans Series results ===
(key) (Races in bold indicate pole position; results in italics indicate fastest lap)

Year	Entrant	Class	Chassis	Engine	1	2	3	4	5	6	Rank	Points
2022	Algarve Pro Racing	LMP2	Oreca 07	Gibson GK428 4.2 L V8	LEC	IMO	MNZ	CAT	SPA; 8	ALG; 5	17th	14
2024	United Autosports	LMP2	Oreca 07	Gibson GK428 4.2 L V8	**CAT**; 3	LEC; 5	IMO; 11	SPA; 9	MUG; 11	ALG; 10	10th	29

=== Complete FIA World Endurance Championship results ===
Year	Entrant	Class	Chassis	Engine	1	2	3	4	5	6	7	Pos.	Points
2023	Prema Racing	LMP2	Oreca 07	Gibson GK428 4.2 L V8	SEB; 7	ALG; 5	SPA; 4	LMS; 10	MNZ; 9	FUJ; 8	BHR; 4	10th	57

=== Complete 24 Hours of Le Mans results ===
Year	Team	Co-drivers	Car	Class	Laps	Pos.	Class pos.
2023	(Italy) Prema Racing	(United States) Juan Manuel Correa (Netherlands) Bent Viscaal	Oreca 07-Gibson	LMP2	310	34th	16th

=== Complete International GT Open results ===
(key) (Races in bold indicate pole position; races in italics indicate points for the fastest lap of top ten finishers)

Year	Team	Car	1	2	3	4	5	6	7	8	9	10	11	12	13	14	DC	Points
2025	Oregon Team	Lamborghini Huracán GT3 Evo 2	ALG; 1; 20	ALG; 2; 23	SPA; 1; 18	HOC; 1; 16	HOC; 2; 17	HUN; 1	HUN; 2	LEC; 1	LEC; 2	RBR; 1	RBR; 2	CAT; 1	CAT; 2	MNZ	58th	0

=== Complete Porsche Supercup results ===
(key) (Races in bold indicate pole position) (Races in italics indicate fastest lap)

Year	Team	1	2	3	4	5	6	7	8	Pos.	Points
2026	Ombra Racing	MON; 18	CAT; 16	RBR; 19	SPA; 21	HUN; 14	ZND; Ret	ZND; 13	MNZ	18th	9
