= 2020 F4 Spanish Championship =

5th season of the Spanish F4 Championship

The 2020 F4 Spanish Championship was the fifth season of the Spanish F4 Championship. It was a multi-event motor racing championship for open wheel, formula racing cars regulated according to FIA Formula 4 regulations, taking place in Spain. The championship featured drivers competing in 1.4 litre Tatuus-Abarth single seat race cars that conformed to the technical regulations for the championship. The series was organised by RFEDA.

== Entry list ==
Team	No.	Driver	Class	Rounds
(Spain) Drivex School	5	(Portugal) Manuel Silva	R	4
(Spain) Drivex School	6	(Russia) Ivan Nosov		1–5, 7
(Spain) Drivex School	15	(Switzerland) Léna Bühler	R F	All
(Spain) Drivex School	18	(Russia) Maksim Arkhangelskiy	R	7
(Spain) Drivex School	22	(France) Paul-Adrien Pallot		All
(Spain) Drivex School	26	(France) Augustin Collinot		1–5
(Spain) Drivex School	44	(Portugal) Guilherme Oliveira	R	6
(Spain) Drivex School	75	(Colombia) Nicolás Baptiste	R	6
(Spain) FA Racing by Drivex	85	(Denmark) Valdemar Eriksen		1–5
(Spain) Global Racing Service	7	(Spain) Lorenzo Fluxá	R	All
(Spain) Global Racing Service	10	(Mexico) Eloy Sebastián López	R	1–6
(Spain) Global Racing Service	31	(Mexico) Alex García		All
(Spain) Global Racing Service	52	(Morocco) Suleiman Zanfari	R	All
(Spain) MOL Racing	8	(Spain) Javier Sagrera	R	1–5
(Netherlands) MP Motorsport	11	(France) Enzo Joulié	R	All
(Netherlands) MP Motorsport	13	(Switzerland) Joshua Dufek	R	All
(Netherlands) MP Motorsport	23	(Netherlands) Thomas ten Brinke	R	3–7
(Netherlands) MP Motorsport	27	(Netherlands) Kas Haverkort	R	All
(Netherlands) MP Motorsport	38	(Argentina) Ignacio Montenegro	R	3–4
(Netherlands) MP Motorsport	64	(Spain) Mari Boya	R	All
(Netherlands) MP Motorsport	96	(Denmark) Oliver Goethe	R	All
(Switzerland) Jenzer Motorsport	14	(Romania) Filip Ugran		2
(Switzerland) Jenzer Motorsport	16	(Switzerland) Jasin Ferati	R	2
(Switzerland) Jenzer Motorsport	84	(Italy) Francesco Simonazzi	R	2
(Belgium) M2 Competition	17	(France) Émilien Denner	R	7
(Spain) Fórmula de Campeones - Praga F4	33	(Spain) Carles Martínez		All
(Spain) Fórmula de Campeones - Praga F4	34	(Spain) Quique Bordás	R	All
(United Arab Emirates) Xcel Motorsport	88	(Iran) Mehrbod Shameli	R	All

Icon	Legend
R	Rookie
F	Female Trophy

== Race calendar ==
The series posted the original schedule on 4 December 2019. After the start of the season was delayed due to the 2019-20 coronavirus pandemic, the series released a new calendar on 1 June 2020.

Round		Circuit	Date	Pole position	Fastest lap	Winning driver	Winning team	Rookie winner	Supporting
1	R1	(Spain) Circuito de Navarra, Los Arcos	18 July	(Netherlands) Kas Haverkort	(Netherlands) Kas Haverkort	(Netherlands) Kas Haverkort	(Netherlands) MP Motorsport	(Netherlands) Kas Haverkort	GT-CER
1	R2	(Spain) Circuito de Navarra, Los Arcos	19 July	(Netherlands) Kas Haverkort	(Netherlands) Kas Haverkort	(Netherlands) Kas Haverkort	(Netherlands) MP Motorsport	(Netherlands) Kas Haverkort	GT-CER
1	R3	(Spain) Circuito de Navarra, Los Arcos	19 July	(Switzerland) Joshua Dufek	(Denmark) Oliver Goethe	(Netherlands) Kas Haverkort	(Netherlands) MP Motorsport	(Netherlands) Kas Haverkort	GT-CER
2	R1	(France) Circuit Paul Ricard, Le Castellet	22 August	(Romania) Filip Ugran	(Romania) Filip Ugran	(Romania) Filip Ugran	(Switzerland) Jenzer Motorsport	(Netherlands) Kas Haverkort	International GT Open; Euroformula Open Championship; TCR Europe Touring Car Series
2	R2	(France) Circuit Paul Ricard, Le Castellet	23 August	(Romania) Filip Ugran	(Netherlands) Kas Haverkort	(Romania) Filip Ugran	(Switzerland) Jenzer Motorsport	(Spain) Mari Boya	International GT Open; Euroformula Open Championship; TCR Europe Touring Car Series
2	R3	(France) Circuit Paul Ricard, Le Castellet	23 August	(Spain) Mari Boya	(Spain) Mari Boya	(Denmark) Oliver Goethe	(Netherlands) MP Motorsport	(Denmark) Oliver Goethe	International GT Open; Euroformula Open Championship; TCR Europe Touring Car Series
3	R1	(Spain) Circuito de Jerez, Jerez de la Frontera	19 September	(France) Enzo Joulié	(Netherlands) Thomas ten Brinke	(Spain) Mari Boya	(Netherlands) MP Motorsport	(Spain) Mari Boya	TCR-CER
3	R2	(Spain) Circuito de Jerez, Jerez de la Frontera	20 September	(Morocco) Suleiman Zanfari	(Netherlands) Kas Haverkort	(Denmark) Valdemar Eriksen	(Spain) FA Racing by Drivex	(Denmark) Oliver Goethe	TCR-CER
3	R3	(Spain) Circuito de Jerez, Jerez de la Frontera	20 September	(Netherlands) Kas Haverkort	(Netherlands) Thomas ten Brinke	(Netherlands) Kas Haverkort	(Netherlands) MP Motorsport	(Netherlands) Kas Haverkort	TCR-CER
4	R1	(Spain) Circuit Ricardo Tormo, Cheste	26 September	(Netherlands) Kas Haverkort	(Netherlands) Thomas ten Brinke	(Netherlands) Kas Haverkort	(Netherlands) MP Motorsport	(Netherlands) Kas Haverkort	Renault Clio Cup Spain
4	R2	(Spain) Circuit Ricardo Tormo, Cheste	27 September	(Netherlands) Kas Haverkort	(Switzerland) Joshua Dufek	(Netherlands) Kas Haverkort	(Netherlands) MP Motorsport	(Netherlands) Kas Haverkort	Renault Clio Cup Spain
4	R3	(Spain) Circuit Ricardo Tormo, Cheste	27 September	(Netherlands) Kas Haverkort	(Spain) Mari Boya	(Netherlands) Kas Haverkort	(Netherlands) MP Motorsport	(Netherlands) Kas Haverkort	Renault Clio Cup Spain
5	R1	(Spain) Ciudad del Motor de Aragón, Alcañiz	31 October	(Spain) Mari Boya	(Netherlands) Kas Haverkort	(Spain) Mari Boya	(Netherlands) MP Motorsport	(Spain) Mari Boya	FIA WTCR Race of Spain; Renault Clio Cup Spain
5	R2	(Spain) Ciudad del Motor de Aragón, Alcañiz	1 November	(Spain) Mari Boya	(Netherlands) Kas Haverkort	(Spain) Mari Boya	(Netherlands) MP Motorsport	(Spain) Mari Boya	FIA WTCR Race of Spain; Renault Clio Cup Spain
5	R3	(Spain) Ciudad del Motor de Aragón, Alcañiz	1 November	(Netherlands) Kas Haverkort	(Netherlands) Kas Haverkort	(Netherlands) Kas Haverkort	(Netherlands) MP Motorsport	(Netherlands) Kas Haverkort	FIA WTCR Race of Spain; Renault Clio Cup Spain
6	R1	(Spain) Circuito del Jarama, Madrid	7 November	(Netherlands) Kas Haverkort	(Netherlands) Kas Haverkort	(Netherlands) Kas Haverkort	(Netherlands) MP Motorsport	(Netherlands) Kas Haverkort	TCR Europe Touring Car Series
6	R2	(Spain) Circuito del Jarama, Madrid	7 November	(Netherlands) Kas Haverkort	(Netherlands) Kas Haverkort	(Netherlands) Kas Haverkort	(Netherlands) MP Motorsport	(Netherlands) Kas Haverkort	TCR Europe Touring Car Series
6	R3	(Spain) Circuito del Jarama, Madrid	7 November	(Netherlands) Kas Haverkort	(Netherlands) Kas Haverkort	(Netherlands) Kas Haverkort	(Netherlands) MP Motorsport	(Netherlands) Kas Haverkort	TCR Europe Touring Car Series
7	R1	(Spain) Circuit de Barcelona-Catalunya	14 November	(Netherlands) Kas Haverkort	(Netherlands) Thomas ten Brinke	(Netherlands) Kas Haverkort	(Netherlands) MP Motorsport	(Netherlands) Kas Haverkort	GT-CER; Renault Clio Cup Spain
7	R2	(Spain) Circuit de Barcelona-Catalunya	15 November	(Netherlands) Kas Haverkort	(Spain) Mari Boya	(Netherlands) Kas Haverkort	(Netherlands) MP Motorsport	(Netherlands) Kas Haverkort	GT-CER; Renault Clio Cup Spain
7	R3	(Spain) Circuit de Barcelona-Catalunya	15 November	(Netherlands) Thomas ten Brinke	(Spain) Mari Boya	(Netherlands) Thomas ten Brinke	(Netherlands) MP Motorsport	(Netherlands) Thomas ten Brinke	GT-CER; Renault Clio Cup Spain

== Championship standings ==
Points were awarded to the top ten classified finishers in races 1 and 3 and for the top eight classified finishers in race 2. For Round 2 at Paul Ricard only Race 1 awarded full points.

Races	Position, points per race											
Races	**1st**	**2nd**	**3rd**	**4th**	**5th**	**6th**	**7th**	**8th**	**9th**	**10th**	**Pole**	**FL**
Races 1 & 3	25	18	15	12	10	8	6	4	2	1	2	1
Race 2	15	12	10	8	6	4	2	1				1

=== Drivers' championship ===
Rookie Trophy R Female Trophy F

Pos	Driver	NAV (Spain)			LEC (France)			JER (Spain)			CRT (Spain)			ARA (Spain)			JAR (Spain)			CAT (Spain)			Pts
Pos	Driver	R1	R2	R3	R1	R2	R3	R1	R2	R3	R1	R2	R3	R1	R2	R3	R1	R2	R3	R1	R2	R3	Pts
1	(Netherlands) Kas Haverkort **R**	**1**	**1**	1	2	Ret	4	Ret	17	**1**	**1**	**1**	**1**	2	3	**1**	**1**	**1**	**1**	**1**	**1**	2	383
2	(Spain) Mari Boya **R**	2	9	4	3	2	**3**	1	18†	2	7	4	2	**1**	**1**	3	3	9	4	3	3	3	273
3	(Netherlands) Thomas ten Brinke **R**							2	4	3	3	3	17	4	2	14†	4	3	2	2	4	**1**	187
4	(Switzerland) Joshua Dufek **R**	11	7	**3**	Ret	6	5	3	3	5	2	2	Ret	3	4	10	2	2	5	4	6	4	187
5	(Denmark) Oliver Goethe **R**	3	2	2	5	4	1	8	2	10	9	7	15	Ret	9	4	10	13	3	11	8	7	136
6	(Spain) Lorenzo Fluxá **R**	4	3	6	7	15	6	5	5	12	6	6	7	6	14	Ret	11	7	Ret	6	11	6	103
7	(Russia) Ivan Nosov	Ret	6	11	8	8	7	4	16	4	20	8	3	Ret	10	9				5	2	5	85
8	(Spain) Quique Bordás **R**	Ret	12	9	11	7	18	6	7	7	10	14	4	7	6	2	5	5	Ret	8	9	10	84
9	(Spain) Carles Martínez	13	4	Ret	17	16	10	Ret	11	13	5	10	5	14	5	6	6	Ret	11	9	10	8	57
10	(Romania) Filip Ugran				**1**	**1**	2																55
11	(Denmark) Valdemar Eriksen	5	10	5	10	9	15	Ret	1	6	8	16	13	10	7	13							51
12	(France) Paul-Adrien Pallot	7	11	14	14	11	11	11	14	15	4	9	12	5	8	Ret	8	10	7	7	7	9	51
13	(France) Enzo Joulié **R**	10	14	16	Ret	12	14	**7**	6	16	12	Ret	8	9	11	8	9	8	6	13	14	15	37
14	(Italy) Francesco Simonazzi **R**				4	3	8																23
15	(Switzerland) Léna Bühler **R** **F**	12	8	8	Ret	13	17	Ret	8	14	18	15	16	Ret	15†	5	16†	DNS	Ret	10	5	12	23
16	(Morocco) Suleiman Zanfari **R**	14	16	13	12	19†	9	DSQ	**DSQ**	9	16	5	19	11	13	7	12	6	10	15	12	16	22
17	(France) Augustin Collinot	6	5	7	13	10	12	DNA	DNA	DNA	17	17	14	DNA	DNA	DNA							20
18	(Iran) Mehrbod Shameli **R**	9	15	15	16	18	20	13	15	19	13	Ret	6	8	12	Ret	15	Ret	8	14	13	13	18
19	(Switzerland) Jasin Ferati **R**				6	5	13																14
20	(Spain) Javier Sagrera **R**	8	13	10	9	Ret	21†	10	10	17	Ret	11	Ret	DNA	DNA	DNA							8
21	(Mexico) Eloy Sebastián López **R**	15	17	12	18	17	19	Ret	13	8	15	13	18	13	Ret	12	DNA	DNA	DNA				4
22	(Mexico) Alex García	DSQ	DSQ	DSQ	15	14	16	9	9	11	11	12	9	12	16	11	13	12	Ret	12	17	11	4
23	(Portugal) Manuel Silva **R**										14	19	10										1
24	(Argentina) Ignacio Montenegro **R**							12	12	18	19	18	11										0
Guest drivers ineligible to score points
–	(Portugal) Guilherme Oliveira **R**																7	4	9				–
–	(Colombia) Nicolás Baptiste **R**																14	11	12				–
–	(Russia) Maksim Arkhangelskiy **R**																			16	15	14	–
–	(France) Émilien Denner **R**																			17	16	17	–
Pos	Driver	R1	R2	R3	R1	R2	R3	R1	R2	R3	R1	R2	R3	R1	R2	R3	R1	R2	R3	R1	R2	R3	Pts
Pos	Driver	NAV (Spain)			LEC (France)			JER (Spain)			CRT (Spain)			ARA (Spain)			JAR (Spain)			CAT (Spain)			Pts

Colour	Result
Gold	Winner
Silver	Second place
Bronze	Third place
Green	Points classification
Blue	Non-points classification
Blue	Non-classified finish (NC)
Purple	Retired, not classified (Ret)
Red	Did not qualify (DNQ)
Red	Did not pre-qualify (DNPQ)
Black	Disqualified (DSQ)
White	Did not start (DNS)
White	Withdrew (WD)
White	Race cancelled (C)
Blank	Did not practice (DNP)
Blank	Did not arrive (DNA)
Blank	Excluded (EX)

**Bold** – Pole
Italics – Fastest Lap

Notes:

- † — Drivers did not finish the race, but were classified as they completed over 75% of the race distance.

=== Teams' championship ===
Pos	Team	Pts
1	(Netherlands) MP Motorsport	745
2	(Spain) Drivex School	239
3	(Spain) Fórmula de Campeones Praga F4	142
4	(Spain) Global Racing Service	125
5	(Switzerland) Jenzer Motorsport	75
6	(United Arab Emirates) Xcel Motorsport	18
7	(Spain) MOL Racing	7
