= 2024 Porsche Sprint Challenge Southern Europe =

The 2024 Porsche Sprint Challenge Southern Europe was the second season of the Porsche one-make motor racing championship held across Southern Europe in the Iberian Peninsula. The season began on 27 January 2024 at Portimão and finished on 2 March at Barcelona.

== Teams and drivers ==
Team	No.	Driver	Class	Rounds
Sport Division
(Netherlands) Team GP Elite	8	(Turkey) Cengiz James Oguzhan	PA	All
(Netherlands) Team GP Elite	28	(Netherlands) Huub van Eijndhoven	P	2
(Netherlands) Team GP Elite	72	(Netherlands) Kas Haverkort	P	3–4
(Netherlands) Team GP Elite	78	(Israel) Ariel Levi	P	All
(Netherlands) Team GP Elite	84	(New Zealand) Marco Giltrap	P	All
(Switzerland) Fach Auto Tech	3	(Switzerland) Thomas Winkler	PA	1
(Netherlands) Hans Weijs Motorsport	4	(Netherlands) Juriaan De Back	P	All
(Italy) Ombra Racing	9	(Romania) Filip Ugran	P	1–2
(Italy) Ombra Racing	9	(United Kingdom) Oliver Gray	P	3–4
(Italy) Ombra Racing	91	(United States) Anthony Imperato	P	1–3
(Italy) Ghinzani Arco Motorsport	10	(Italy) Pietro Armanni	P	All
(Netherlands) Team Raceart	12	(Netherlands) Senna Van Soelen	P	All
(Netherlands) Team Raceart	77	(Netherlands) Jules Grouwels	PA	All
(Germany) Proton Huber Competition	13	(Germany) Alexander Tauscher	P	All
(Germany) Proton Huber Competition	16	(Netherlands) Flynt Schuring	P	3
(Germany) Proton Huber Competition	31	(Germany) Sebastian Freymuth	P	All
(Germany) Proton Huber Competition	88	(Austria) Horst Felix Felbermayr	P	All
(Germany) Proton Huber Competition	95	(United Kingdom) Josh Stanton	P	All
(Belgium) Redant Racing	17	(Belgium) Dréke Janssen	P	All
Porsche Estonia	48	(Estonia) Thomas Kangro	P	All
Porsche Estonia	123	(Estonia) Henri Tuomaala	PA	3–4
(France) Martinet by Alméras	20	(Spain) Fernando Monje	P	All
(France) Martinet by Alméras	29	(France) Louis Rousset	P	All
(France) Martinet by Alméras	94	(France) Mathys Jaubert	P	1, 4
(Netherlands) JW Raceservice	21	(Netherlands) Sacha Norden	P	All
(Italy) Raptor Engineering	27	(Italy) Guirreri Giuseppe	P	All
(Sweden) WestCoast Racing	32	(Sweden) Robin Knutsson	P	All
(Italy) BeDriver	37	(Italy) Alberto Cerqui	P	1–2
(Italy) BeDriver	37	(Italy) Gianluca Giorgi	PA	3
(Germany) ID Racing	44	(Germany) Christoph Langer	PA	1–2
(Estonia) EST1 Racing	47	(Estonia) Alexander Reimann	PA	All
(Portugal) Veloso Motorsport	52	(United Kingdom) Angus Whiteside	P	All
(United Kingdom) Team Parker Racing	54	(United Kingdom) Hugo Ellis	P	1–3
(United Kingdom) Team Parker Racing	55	(United Kingdom) Sid Smith	P	All
Belgium Racing	99	(Belgium) Jef Machiels	P	2–4
(Germany) HP Racing International	911	(Italy) Gian Luca Tüccaroglu	P	4
(Germany) HP Racing International	998	(Germany) Jan Seyffarth	P	3–4
Club Division
(Netherlands) Team GP Elite	2	(Lithuania) Paulius Zadeika	Am	1, 4
(Switzerland) Fach Auto Tech	3	(Switzerland) Thomas Winkler	Am	4
(Switzerland) Fach Auto Tech	5	(Switzerland) Peter Hegglin	Am	3–4
(Switzerland) Fach Auto Tech	14	(Switzerland) Niels Lofterød	Am	1, 3–4
(Switzerland) Fach Auto Tech	15	(Switzerland) Ernst Inderbitzin	Am	1–3
(Belgium) Speedlover Racing	7	(Belgium) Didier Glorieux	Am	2–3
(Belgium) Speedlover Racing	25	(United States) Dominique Bastien	Am	1, 4
(Belgium) Speedlover Racing	50	(Belgium) Phillipe Wils	Am	All
(Belgium) Speedlover Racing	51	(Belgium) John de Wilde	Am	3
Porsche Estonia	18	(Estonia) Jukka Eerola	Am	1–3
(Italy) Enrico Fulgenzi Racing	22	(Italy) Andrea Buratti	Am	All
(Italy) Enrico Fulgenzi Racing	23	(Kyrgyzstan) Stanislav Minskiy	Am	2–3
(Italy) Enrico Fulgenzi Racing	24	(Italy) Corrado Costa	Am	All
(Ukraine) Hadeca Racing	33	(Ukraine) Oleksandr Dobik	Am	All
(Italy) BeDriver	37	(Italy) Gianluca Giorgi	Am	4
(Germany) Proton Huber Competition	39	(Bulgaria) Merabi Mekvabishvili	Am	All
(Germany) Proton Huber Competition	63	(Czech Republic) Robert Sulma	Am	All
(Germany) Proton Huber Competition	145	(Brazil) Marcelo Tomasoni	Am	4
(Germany) ID Racing	42	(Greece) Antonius Wossos	Am	4
(United Kingdom) Team Parker Racing	56	(United Kingdom) Lee Mowle	Am	1–2
(Germany) Laptime Performance	69	(Germany) Lorenzo von Matterhorn	Am	4
(Germany) Laptime Performance	70	(United States) Mihail Mihaylov	Am	All
(Germany) Laptime Performance	71	(Germany) Jürgen Vollet	Am	1, 3–4
(San Marino) Tsunami R.T.	79	(Italy) Johannes Zelger	Am	3
(Estonia) EST1 Racing	80	(Italy) Angelo Fontana	Am	4
(Estonia) EST1 Racing	191	(Venezuela) Javier Ripoll Jr	Am	All
Belgium Racing	98	(Belgium) Michael Cool	Am	4
Belgium Racing	99	(Belgium) Nicolas Saelens	Am	1
(Netherlands) Hans Weijs Motorsport	112	(Netherlands) Alfred Lenferink	Am	4
(Netherlands) Hans Weijs Motorsport	372	(Netherlands) Mark van Eldik	Am	4
(Romania) RO1 Racing	217	(Romania) Camil Alexandru Perian	Am	1
(Germany) HP Racing International	717	(United Kingdom) Ian Loggie	Am	1
GT4 Entries
(Netherlands) Team GP Elite	6	(Netherlands) Jules Marien		1
(Netherlands) Team GP Elite	18	(Netherlands) Dino van der Geest		4
(United Kingdom) WDP Racing	11	(United Kingdom) Graham King		All
(United Kingdom) Team Parker Racing	222	(United Kingdom) Seb Hopkins		1–2
(United Kingdom) Team Parker Racing	222	(Republic of Ireland) Robert Cronin		3–4
(Netherlands) Snel Motorsport	989	(Netherlands) Henk Van Norel		All

== Calendar ==
Round	Circuit	Date
1	(Portugal) Algarve International Circuit, Portimão	27–28 January
2	(Portugal) Circuito do Estoril, Estoril	2–3 February
3	(Spain) Circuit Ricardo Tormo, Cheste	23–24 February
4	(Spain) Circuit de Barcelona-Catalunya, Montmeló	1–2 March

== Race results ==
Round	Circuit	Pole position	Fastest lap	Overall winner	Pro-Am Winner	Am Winner	GT4 Winner
1	(Portugal) Algarve	(Israel) Ariel Levi	(Israel) Ariel Levi	(Germany) Alexander Tauscher	(Estonia) Alexander Reimann	(Belgium) Nicolas Saelens	(United Kingdom) Seb Hopkins
1	(Portugal) Algarve	(Israel) Ariel Levi	(France) Mathys Jaubert	(Israel) Ariel Levi	(Netherlands) Jules Grouwels	(United Kingdom) Ian Loggie	(United Kingdom) Seb Hopkins
2	(Portugal) Estoril	(Germany) Alexander Tauscher	(Israel) Ariel Levi	(Israel) Ariel Levi	(Netherlands) Jules Grouwels	(Belgium) Philippe Wils	(United Kingdom) Seb Hopkins
2	(Portugal) Estoril	(Israel) Ariel Levi	(Israel) Ariel Levi	(Israel) Ariel Levi	(Estonia) Alexander Reimann	(Czech Republic) Robert Sulma	(United Kingdom) Seb Hopkins
3	(Spain) Valencia	(United Kingdom) Hugo Ellis	(United Kingdom) Hugo Ellis	(Netherlands) Kas Haverkort	(Finland) Henri Tuomaala	(Czech Republic) Robert Sulma	
3	(Spain) Valencia	(Israel) Ariel Levi	(Israel) Ariel Levi	(Germany) Alexander Tauscher	(Estonia) Alexander Reimann	(Belgium) John de Wilde	
4	(Spain) Barcelona	(France) Mathys Jaubert	(France) Mathys Jaubert	(France) Mathys Jaubert	(Estonia) Alexander Reimann	(Belgium) Michael Cool	
4	(Spain) Barcelona		(France) Mathys Jaubert	(Netherlands) Kas Haverkort	(Estonia) Alexander Reimann	(Belgium) Michael Cool	

== Standings ==
=== Scoring system ===
Position	1st	2nd	3rd	4th	5th	6th	7th	8th	9th	10th	11th	12th	13th	14th	15th
Points	25	20	17	14	12	10	9	8	7	6	5	4	3	2	1

=== Overall championship ===
Pos	Driver	ALG (Portugal)		EST (Portugal)		VAL (Spain)		CAT (Spain)		Pts
Pos	Driver	R1	R2	R1	R2	R1	R2	R1	R2	Pts
1	(Israel) Ariel Levi	3	1	1	1	6	17	2	3	138
2	(Germany) Alexander Tauscher	1	12	10	4	10	11	3	2	95
3	(Germany) Sebastian Freymuth	4	Ret	2	2	9	Ret	6	4	86
4	(France) Mathys Jaubert	2	6					1	5	66
5	(Netherlands) Kas Haverkort					1	Ret	4	1	63
6	(Netherlands) Sacha Norden	7	7	18	8	29	2	7	10	61
7	(France) Louis Rousset	11	3	5	13	16	12	8	6	60
8	(New Zealand) Marco Giltrap	5	2	19	9	8	19	11	8	59
9	(Netherlands) Senna Van Soelen	Ret	9	3	Ret	13	1	13	Ret	55
10	(Germany) Jan Seyffert					2	3	9	7	52
11	(United Kingdom) Hugo Ellis	13	15	4	10	3	6			49
12	(Austria) Horst Felix Felbermayr	6	11	7	6	7	Ret	12	22	45
13	(Sweden) Robin Knutsson	12	10	11	3	5	Ret	DNS	DNS	42
14	(Italy) Pietro Armanni	10	5	Ret	12	21	4	10	Ret	39
15	(United Kingdom) Angus Whiteside	9	13	9	16	4	20	15	12	36
16	(United Kingdom) Sid Smith	20	14	15	21	20	8	5	9	29
17	(Romania) Filip Ugran	8	8	14	7					27
18	(Italy) Alberto Cerqui	21	4	6	Ret					23
19	(Netherlands) Huub van Eijndhoven			8	5					19
20	(United Kingdom) Josh Stanton	14	Ret	12	15	28	5	23	Ret	19
21	(Spain) Fernando Monje	19	18	13	11	11	16	19	14	16
22	(United Kingdom) Oliver Gray					15	9	14	Ret	11
23	(Italy) Giuseppe Guirreri	17	Ret	21	Ret	14	13	18	11	11
24	(Estonia) Thomas Kangro	25	16	NC	Ret	17	7	24	19	9
25	(Belgium) Jef Machiels			17	Ret	18	10	16	13	9
26	(United States) Anthony Imperato	15	20	20	Ret	23	Ret			1
27	(Netherlands) Juriaan De Back	23	17	16	18	27	Ret	Ret	16	1
28	(Italy) Gian Luca Tüccaroglu							20	17	0
29	(Netherlands) Dréke Janssen	18	Ret	24	Ret	19	21	Ret	Ret	0
–	(Netherlands) Flynt Schuring					Ret	Ret			–
Pos	Driver	R1	R2	R1	R2	R1	R2	R1	R2	Pts
Pos	Driver	ALG (Portugal)		EST (Portugal)		VAL (Spain)		CAT (Spain)		Pts

=== Pro-Am ===
Pos	Driver	ALG (Portugal)		EST (Portugal)		VAL (Spain)		CAT (Spain)		Pts
Pos	Driver	R1	R2	R1	R2	R1	R2	R1	R2	Pts
1	(Estonia) Alexander Reimann	16	22	23	12	25	14	17	15	174
2	(Netherlands) Jules Grouwels	22	19	22	17	22	Ret	22	20	142
3	(Turkey) Cengiz James Oguzhan	24	21	26	20	26	18	Ret	21	102
4	(Finland) Henri Tuomaala					12	15	21	18	85
5	(Germany) Christoph Langer	DNS	DNS	25	19					32
6	(Italy) Gianluca Giorgi					24	Ret			16
7	(Switzerland) Thomas Winkler	26	DNS							13
Pos	Driver	R1	R2	R1	R2	R1	R2	R1	R2	Pts
Pos	Driver	ALG (Portugal)		EST (Portugal)		VAL (Spain)		CAT (Spain)		Pts

=== Am ===
Pos	Driver	ALG (Portugal)		EST (Portugal)		VAL (Spain)		CAT (Spain)		Pts
Pos	Driver	R1	R2	R1	R2	R1	R2	R1	R2	Pts
1	(Czech Republic) Robert Sulma	4	3	2	1	1	3	2	4	148
2	(Belgium) Philippe Wils	3	4	1	2	2	5	4	8	106
3	(Venezuela) Javier Ripoll Jr	5	5	7	3	6	4	23	12	71
4	(Switzerland) Peter Hegglin					5	2	5	3	58
5	(United States) Mihail Mihaylov	16	11	5	9	9	10	8	14	51
6	(Belgium) Michael Cool							1	1	50
7	(Bulgaria) Merabi Mekvabishvili	8	8	6	5	11	Ret	9	Ret	49
8	(Estonia) Jukka Eerola	7	9	9	7	8	8			49
9	(United Kingdom) Lee Mowle	6	6	4	3					49
10	(Belgium) Nicolas Saelens	1	2							45
11	(United Kingdom) Ian Loggie	2	1							45
12	(Belgium) Didier Glorieux			3	6	7	7			44
13	(Belgium) John de Wilde					3	1			41
14	(Ukraine) Oleksander Dobik	19	17	15	10	10	9	10	11	37
15	(Italy) Angelo Fontana							6	2	30
16	(Switzerland) Thomas Winkler							3	7	25
17	(Italy) Andrea Buratti	Ret	19	11	12	12	11	17	16	24
18	(Italy) Johannes Zelger					4	6			23
19	(Lithuania) Paulius Zadeika	9	7					13	15	22
20	(Germany) Lorenzo von Matterhorn							7	6	19
21	(Kyrgyzstan) Stanislav Minskiy			13	11	16	15			15
22	(Italy) Corrado Costa	13	12	Ret	15	18	Ret	21	19	13
23	(Brazil) Marcelo Tomasoni							19	5	11
24	(Greece) Antonius Wossos							11	10	11
25	(Netherlands) Mark van Eldik							14	9	10
26	(Switzerland) Ernst Inderbitzin	18	DNS	10	Ret	15	18			10
27	(Switzerland) Niels Lofterød	17	16			14	17	22	18	9
28	(Germany) Jürgen Vollet	12	Ret			Ret	12	Ret	DNS	9
29	(United States) Dominique Bastien	14	15					Ret	DNS	7
30	(Romania) Camil Alexandru Perian	11	DNS							6
31	(Italy) Gianluca Giorgi							18	DNS	1
32	(Netherlands) Alfred Lenferink							20	17	0
Pos	Driver	R1	R2	R1	R2	R1	R2	R1	R2	Pts
Pos	Driver	ALG (Portugal)		EST (Portugal)		VAL (Spain)		CAT (Spain)		Pts

=== GT4 ===
Pos	Driver	ALG (Portugal)		EST (Portugal)		VAL (Spain)		CAT (Spain)		Pts
Pos	Driver	R1	R2	R1	R2	R1	R2	R1	R2	Pts
1	(United Kingdom) Graham King	15	13	14	14	17	14	15	Ret	132
2	(Netherlands) Henk van Norel	21	14	12	13	19	16	Ret	DNS	101
3	(United Kingdom) Seb Hopkins	10	10	8	8					100
4	(Republic of Ireland) Robert Cronin					13	13	12	13	100
5	(Netherlands) Jules Marien	20	18							29
6	(Netherlands) Dino van der Geest							16	Ret	16
Pos	Driver	R1	R2	R1	R2	R1	R2	R1	R2	Pts
Pos	Driver	ALG (Portugal)		EST (Portugal)		VAL (Spain)		CAT (Spain)		Pts
