= Deutsche Kart-Meisterschaft =

Kart racing competition in Germany

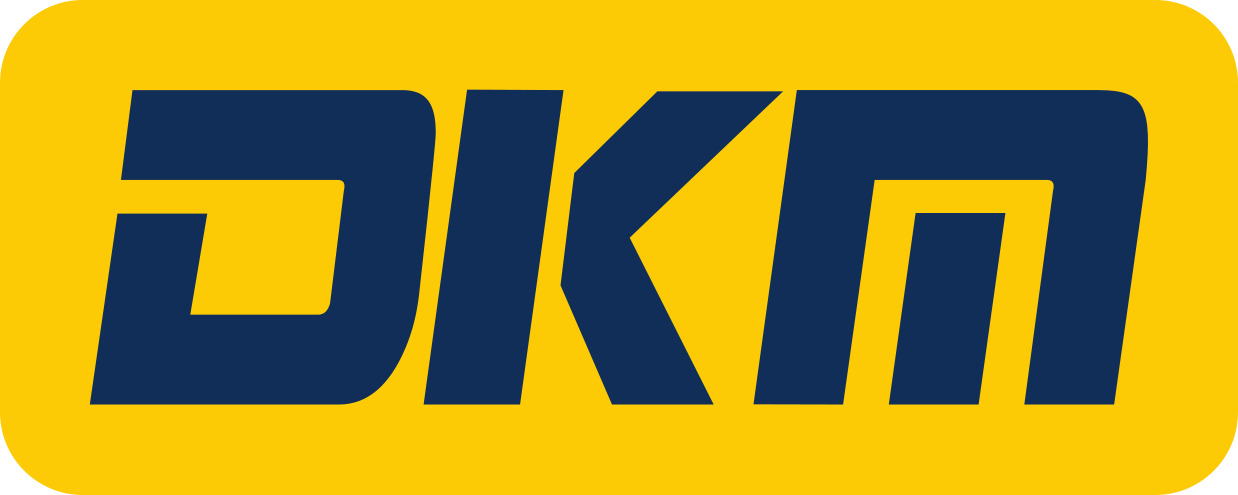
Logo for the DKM 2026

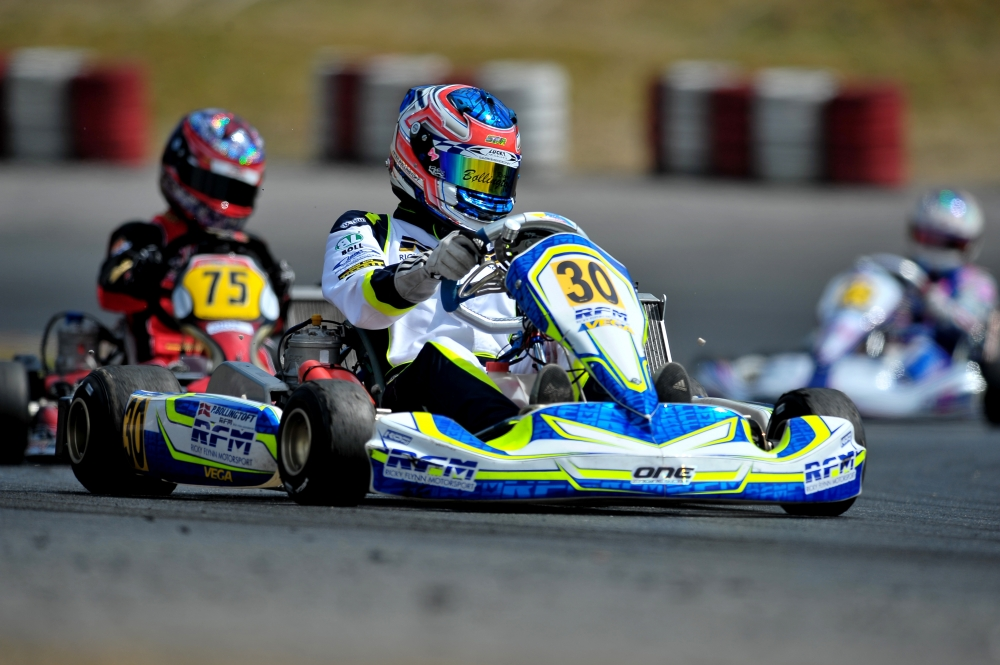
Deutsche Kart-Meisterschaft (2014)

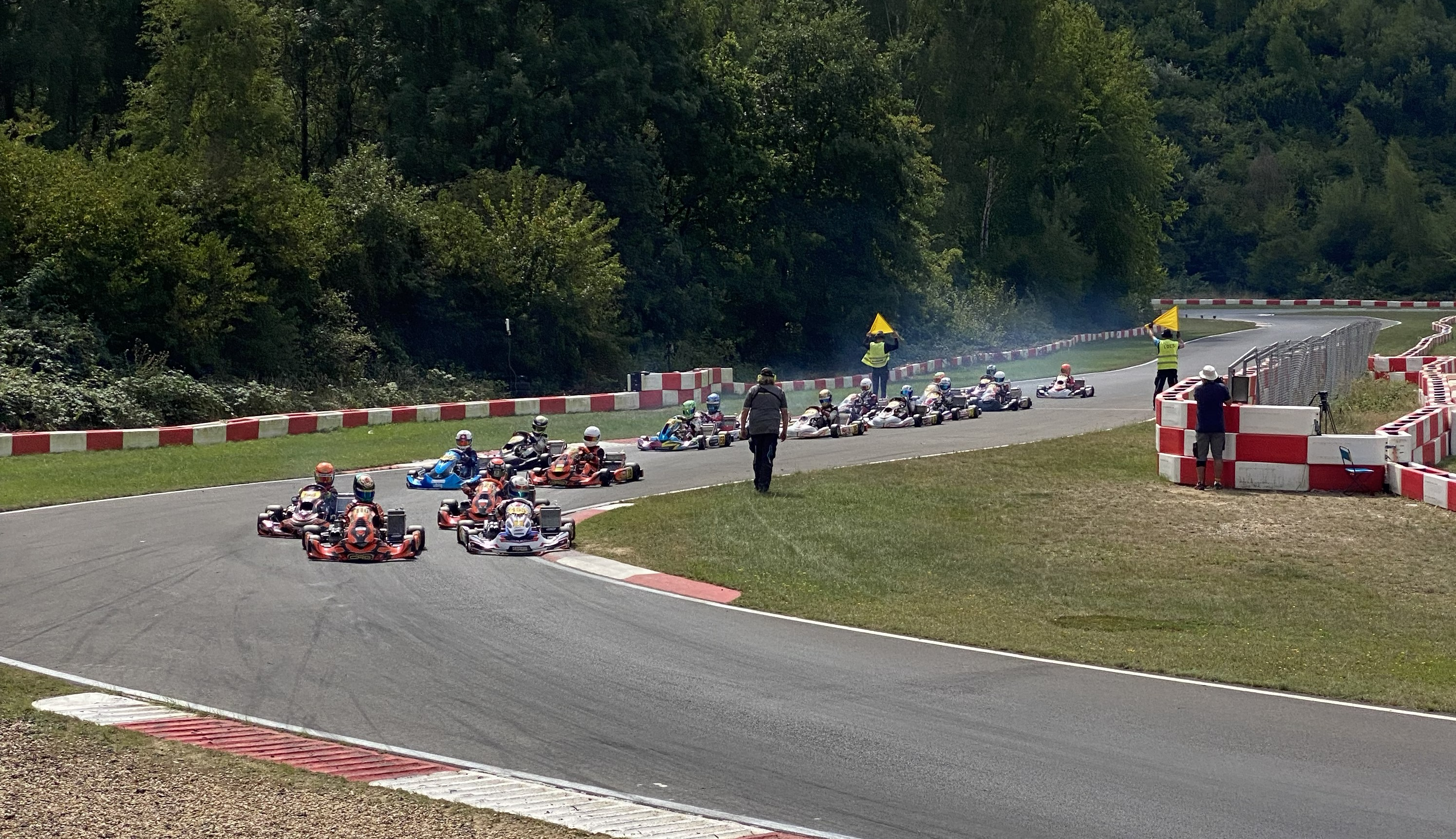
ADAC DKM Kerpen in OK J

The Deutsche Kart-Meisterschaft (Note: lit. 'German Kart Championship') (DKM) is a kart racing series based in Germany, event ruled and organized by the Deutscher Motor Sport Bund.

The series is held annually on the most modern and largest outdoor karting tracks in Germany. The German Kart Championship is divided into four classifications: German Kart Championship (DKM), German Challenger Kart Championship (DCKM), German Junior Kart Championship (DJKM) and German Switching Kart Championship (DSKM).

== Champions ==
Season	Category			
Season	KF1	Challenger (KF2)	Junior (KF3)	DKC/DSKM/DSKC/DMSB
1962	(Germany) Werner Ihle			
1963	(Germany) Werner Ihle			
1964	(Germany) Werner Ihle			
1965	(Germany) Werner Ihle			
1966	(Germany) Leopold Zwelbar			
1967	(Germany) Dieter Ihle			
1968	(Germany) Hans Heyer			
1969	(Germany) Hans Heyer			
1970	(Germany) Hans Heyer			
1971	(Germany) Hans Heyer			
1972	(Germany) Karl-Heinz Hackländer			
1973	(Germany) Karl-Heinz Hackländer			
1974	(Germany) Hugo Brehm			
1975	(Germany) Manfred Schneider			
1976	(Germany) Manfred Schneider			
1977	(Germany) Leopold Zwelbar			
1978	(Germany) Georg Bellof			
1979	(Germany) Jörg van Ommen			
1980	(Germany) Stefan Bellof			
1981	(Germany) Martin Bott			
1982	(Germany) Otto Rensing			
1983	(Germany) Peter Hantscher			
1984	(Germany) Otto Rensing			
1985	(Germany) Joachim Velte			
1986	(Denmark) Gerd Munkholm			
1987	(Germany) Michael Schumacher			
1988	(Germany) Christoph Krumbein			
1989	(Germany) Peter Hantscher		(Germany) Arnd Meier	
1990	(Germany) Arnd Meier		(Austria) Oliver Tichy	
1991	(Germany) Jörg Seidel		(Germany) Norman Simon	
1992	(Germany) Gerwin Schweizer		(Germany) Bernd Friedrich	
1993	(Germany) Gerhard Lindinger		(Germany) Bernd Friedrich	
1994	(Germany) Gerhard Lindinger		(Germany) Timo Scheider	
1995	(Germany) Alexander Zwelbar		(Germany) Timo Bernhard	
1996	(Germany) Alexander Zwelbar		(Germany) Frank Diefenbacher	
1997	(Germany) Michael Bellmann		(Germany) Marc Walz	
1998	(Germany) Marcel Lasée		(Germany) Rico Zschemisch	
1999	(Finland) Toni Vilander		(Poland) Robert Kubica	
2000	(Finland) Oskari Heikkinen		(Germany) Mario Josten	
2001	(Germany) David Hemkemeyer		(Germany) Sebastian Vettel	
2002	(Germany) David Hemkemeyer		(Germany) Nico Hülkenberg	
2003	(Germany) Nico Hülkenberg		(Netherlands) Henkie Waldschmidt	
2004	(Germany) Helmut Sanden		(Germany) Marco Wittmann	
2005	(Germany) Helmut Sanden		(Netherlands) Nigel Melker	(Germany) Simon Solgat
2006	(Denmark) Michael Christensen		(Netherlands) Jack te Braak	(Germany) Marcel Jeleniowski
2007	(Denmark) Michael Christensen	(Germany) Patrick Kappis	(United Kingdom) Tom Grice	(Belgium) Rick Dreezen
2008	(Netherlands) Jack te Braak	(United Kingdom) Tom Grice	(Netherlands) Nyck de Vries	(Belgium) Rick Dreezen
2009	(Denmark) Nicolaj Møller Madsen	(Germany) Moritz Oestreich	(Netherlands) Nyck de Vries	(Belgium) Rick Dreezen
2010	(Denmark) Nicolaj Møller Madsen		(Denmark) Christian Sörensen	(France) Manuel Renaudie
2011	(Germany) Marvin Kirchhöfer		(Norway) Dennis Olsen	(Netherlands) Jorrit Pex
2012	(Norway) Dennis Olsen		(Germany) Hannes Janker	(Netherlands) Jorrit Pex
2013	(Germany) André Matisic		(Netherlands) Martijn van Leeuwen	(Belgium) Rick Dreezen
2014	(Netherlands) Martijn van Leeuwen		(Germany) David Beckmann	(Belgium) Rick Dreezen
2015	(Netherlands) Richard Verschoor		(Netherlands) Bent Viscaal	(Germany) Alexander Schmitz
2016	(Finland) Paavo Tonteri		(Norway) Dennis Hauger	(Netherlands) Jorrit Pex
2017	(Norway) Dennis Hauger		(Netherlands) Kas Haverkort	(Netherlands) Jorrit Pex
2018	(United Kingdom) Harry Thompson		(Netherlands) Thomas ten Brinke	(Italy) Fabian Federer
2019	(United Kingdom) Harry Thompson		(Netherlands) Robert de Haan	(Netherlands) Stan Pex (DSKM) (Netherlands) Senna van Walstijn (DSKC)
2020	(Finland) Juho Valtanen		(Netherlands) Kris Haanen	(Germany) Tim Tröger (DMSB)
2021	(Germany) Niels Tröger		(Singapore) Akshay Bohra	(Netherlands) Senna van Walstijn (DSKM) (Germany) Jakob Bergmeister (DSKC)
2022	(Germany) Maxim Rehm		(Netherlands) Jens Treur	(Netherlands) Jorrit Pex
2023			(Germany) Luke Kornder	(Netherlands) Stan Pex
2024	(Estonia) Markus Kajak		(Germany) Moritz Groneck	(Germany) Maximilian Schleimer (DSKC) (Germany) Milan Rossi (DMKM) (Germany) Marius Bonconseil (X30 Junior) (Germany) Elia Weiss (X30 Senior)
2025	(Italy) Danilo Albanese		(Denmark) Marc Alexander Reistrup	(Netherlands) Jayden Thien (DSKC) (Germany) Devin Titz (DMKM) (Germany) Tom Wickop (X30 Junior) (Germany) Lars Ramaer (X30 Senior)
