= Thomas ten Brinke =

Dutch racing driver

- Nationality: (Netherlands) Dutch
- Born: 23 February 2005 (age 21) Zeddam, Netherlands

Formula Regional European Championship career
- Debut season: 2021
- Current team: ART Grand Prix
- Car number: 23
- Starts: 6 (8 entries)
- Wins: 0
- Podiums: 0
- Poles: 0
- Fastest laps: 0
- Best finish: 17th in 2021

Previous series
- 2020: F4 Spanish Championship

Thomas ten Brinke (born 23 February 2005) is a Dutch former racing driver who last competed in the 2021 Formula Regional Championship with ART Grand Prix. He previously finished third in the Spanish F4 Championship with MP Motorsport.

== Career ==
=== Karting ===
Ten Brinke was inspired by his father Bernhard ten Brinke's ventures in rallying, and started karting competitively in 2018. He was champion in the 2018 German Junior Kart Championship in OKJ. In 2019, also in the OKJ class, he finished third in the FIA Karting European Championship and won the FIA Karting World Championship. In addition, he finished second in the WSK Euro Series and third in the WSK Champions Cup. In 2020, he moved to OK class, but did not compete in the final round of the FIA Karting European Championship and finished thirteenth.

=== Lower formulae ===
In 2020, ten Brinke made his single seater debut in the F4 Spanish Championship with MP Motorsport. He received coaching from former Formula 1 driver Giedo van der Garde. Despite not competing in the first two rounds, ten Brinke finished the season third in the standings with 187 points. He took four podiums in his first five races, and took his maiden win at the final race of the season.

=== Formula Regional European Championship ===
On 20 January 2021, ten Brinke was announced as an ART Grand Prix driver for the upcoming Formula Regional European Championship. He had to withdraw from the first weekend at Imola after he tested positive for COVID-19. He scored points in five of the eight races he entered. However, following his home race at Zandvoort, he made the decision to retire from racing with immediate effect, citing too much pressure to perform and a lack of enjoyment as his reasons.

== Karting record ==
=== Karting career summary ===
Season	Series	Team	Position
2018	CIK-FIA European Championship — OKJ	Ricky Flynn Motorsport	10th
2018	CIK-FIA World Championship — OKJ	Ricky Flynn Motorsport	24th
2018	German Karting Championship — Junior	Ricky Flynn Motorsport	1st
2018	WSK Final Cup — OKJ		10th
2019	Italian Championship — OKJ		2nd
2019	WSK Open Cup — OK	Ricky Flynn Motorsport	10th
2019	German Karting Championship — Senior	Ricky Flynn Motorsport	22nd
2019	CIK-FIA European Championship — OKJ	Ricky Flynn Motorsport	3rd
2019	CIK-FIA World Championship — OKJ	Ricky Flynn Motorsport	1st
2019	WSK Euro Series — OKJ	Ricky Flynn Motorsport	2nd
2019	WSK Champions Cup — OKJ	Ricky Flynn Motorsport	3rd
2019	WSK Super Master Series — OKJ	Ricky Flynn Motorsport	4th
2019	South Garda Winter Cup — OKJ	Ricky Flynn Motorsport	30th
2020	WSK Euro Series — OK		27th
2020	CIK-FIA European Championship — OK	Ricky Flynn Motorsport	13th
2020	South Garda Winter Cup — OK	Ricky Flynn Motorsport	16th
2020	WSK Super Master Series — OK	Ricky Flynn Motorsport	9th
2020	WSK Champions Cup — OK	Ricky Flynn Motorsport	14th

== Racing record ==
=== Racing career summary ===
Season	Series	Team	Races	Wins	Poles	F/Laps	Podiums	Points	Position
2020	F4 Spanish Championship	MP Motorsport	15	1	1	4	9	187	**3rd**
2021	Formula Regional European Championship	ART Grand Prix	8	0	0	0	0	28	17th

=== Complete F4 Spanish Championship results ===
(key) (Races in bold indicate pole position) (Races in italics indicate fastest lap)

Year	Team	1	2	3	4	5	6	7	8	9	10	11	12	13	14	15	16	17	18	19	20	21	DC	Points
2020	MP Motorsport	NAV; 1	NAV; 2	NAV; 3	LEC; 1	LEC; 2	LEC; 3	JER; 1; 2	JER; 2; 4	JER; 3; 3	CRT; 1; 3	CRT; 2; 3	CRT; 3; 17	ARA; 1; 4	ARA; 2; 2	ARA; 3; 14†	JAR; 1; 4	JAR; 2; 3	JAR; 3; 2	CAT; 1; 2	CAT; 2; 4	**CAT**; **3**; 1	3rd	187

=== Complete Formula Regional European Championship results ===
(key) (Races in bold indicate pole position) (Races in italics indicate fastest lap)

Year	Team	1	2	3	4	5	6	7	8	9	10	11	12	13	14	15	16	17	18	19	20	DC	Points
2021	ART Grand Prix	IMO; 1 WD	IMO; 2 WD	CAT; 1; 8	CAT; 2; 6	MCO; 1; 16	MCO; 2; 7	LEC; 1; 8	LEC; 2; 9	ZAN; 1; 19	ZAN; 2; 21	SPA; 1	SPA; 2	RBR; 1	RBR; 2	VAL; 1	VAL; 2	MUG; 1	MUG; 2	MNZ; 1	MNZ; 2	17th	28
