= Kas Haverkort =

Dutch racing driver (born 2003)

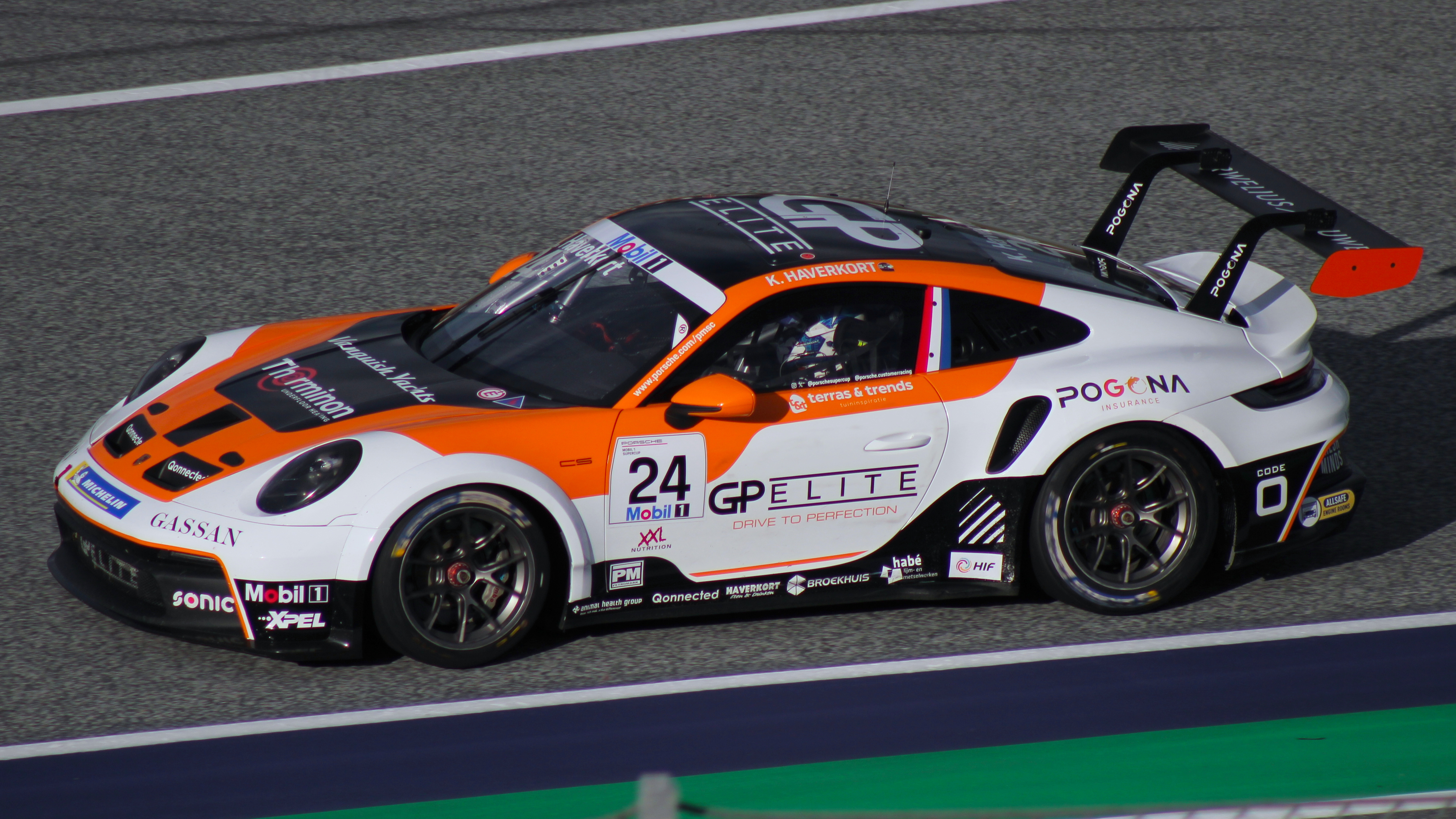
- Haverkort racing in the 2025 Porsche Supercup at the Red Bull Ring.
- Nationality: (Netherlands) Dutch
- Born: 18 November 2003 (age 22) Hardenberg, Netherlands

Formula Regional European Championship career
- Debut season: 2021
- Current team: Van Amersfoort Racing
- Categorisation: FIA Silver
- Car number: 27
- Starts: 60 (60 entries)
- Wins: 4
- Podiums: 10
- Poles: 3
- Fastest laps: 5
- Best finish: 4th in 2023

Previous series
- 2020 2020: Formula Renault Eurocup; F4 Spanish Championship

Championship titles
- 2020: F4 Spanish Championship

Kas Haverkort (Dutch pronunciation: [kɑs ˈɦaːvərkɔrt]; born 18 November 2003) is a Dutch racing driver who last competed in the 2025 Porsche Supercup and 2025 Porsche Carrera Cup Germany for Team GP Elite. He previously competed in the Formula Regional European Championship between 2021 and 2023. He was champion of the F4 Spanish Championship in 2020, driving for MP Motorsport.

== Career ==
=== Karting ===
Haverkort started karting in 2011. His major karting highlights included second in the WSK Final Cup - OK, 1st in the 2017 German Junior Kart Championship, third in the CIK-FIA Karting Academy Trophy in 2016, second in the 2013 Chrono Karting Winter Series, first in the 2012 Chrono Rotax Max Winter Cup Micromax and third in the 2012 Chrono Dutch Rotax Max Challenge - Micromax.

=== Lower formulae ===
In 2020, Haverkort made his car racing debut in the F4 Spanish Championship with MP Motorsport. He dominated the championship, taking thirteen victories and a total of seventeen podium finishes from 21 races. He finished 111 points ahead of teammate Mari Boya and took the title during the penultimate round of the campaign at Jarama, having won all three races of the weekend.

=== Formula Renault Eurocup ===
Haverkort made some appearances in Formula Renault as a guest driver for rounds 6 and 7 with MP Motorsport. In his first qualifying session, he set the eighth fastest time at Catalunya, and he finished the first race ninth and the second race fifth. At Spa, he finished fifth in both races. Haverkort was ineligible for points as he was a guest driver.

=== Formula Regional European Championship ===
==== 2021 ====
In December 2020, Haverkort did the group test at Paul Ricard for MP Motorsport. Three months later the team announced that he would be driving for them in the 2021 Formula Regional European Championship, partnering Franco Colapinto and fellow F4 graduate Oliver Goethe. His first points finish came in the fourth round of the season when he ended up seventh at Le Castellet, and he followed that up with a sixth place at his home race in Zandvoort. He went scoreless for the next three events, but he would finish in the points on three occasions in the final four races, getting a season-best fourth in Monza. Haverkort ended his season in 16th place with a total of 35 points.

==== 2022 ====
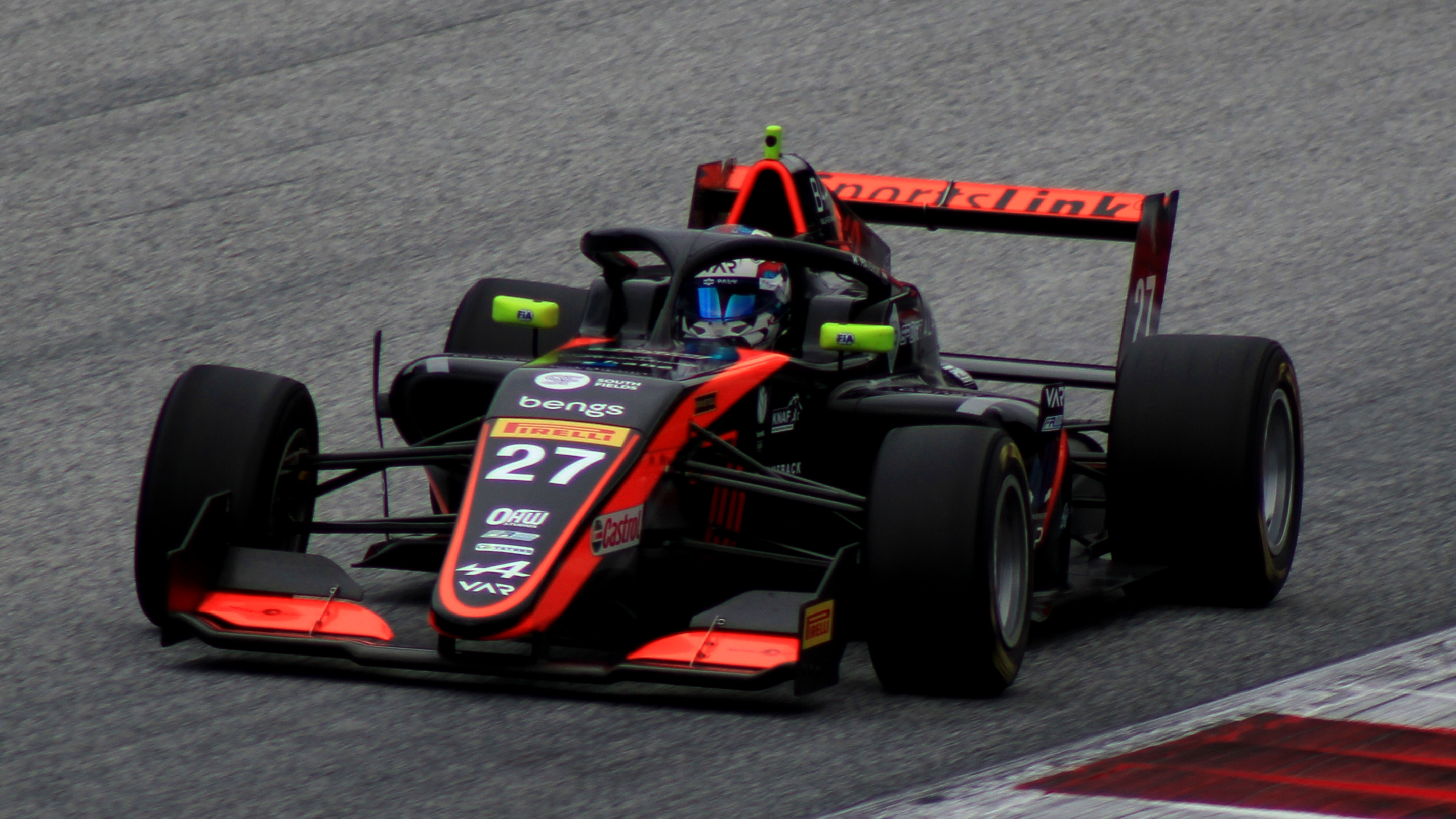
Haverkort racing in the 2022 Formula Regional European Championship at the Red Bull Ring.

For the 2022 season, Haverkort switched to Van Amersfoort Racing. He stated that joining Van Amersfoort would be "key to reaching [his] goals for the [2022] season" after setting the fastest laptime in a test at the Circuit de Barcelona-Catalunya.

==== 2023 ====
Haverkort remained with Van Amersfoort Racing for the 2023 Formula Regional European Championship.

== Karting record ==
=== Karting career summary ===
Season	Series	Team	Position
2011	Chrono Dutch Rotax Max Challenge — Micromax		4th
2011-12	Chrono Dutch Rotax Max Winter Cup — Micromax		1st
2012	Dutch Championship — Mini Juniors		5th
2012	Chrono Dutch Rotax Max Challenge — Micromax		3rd
2013	Chrono Karting Winter Serie — Micromax		2nd
2016	CIK-FIA Karting Academy Trophy		3rd
2016	CIK-FIA World Championship — OKJ	CRG Keijzer Racing	DNF
2017	German Karting Championship — Junior	CRG Keijzer Racing	1st
2017	WSK Super Master Series — OKJ		17th
2017	CIK-FIA European Championship — OKJ		15th
2018	SKUSA SuperNationals — X30 Junior	CRG Nordam	10th
2018	German Karting Championship — Senior	Zanardi Racing Team	4th
2018	WSK Super Master Series — OK		33rd
2018	CIK-FIA European Championship — OK	Zanardi Racing Team	16th
2018	CIK-FIA World Championship — OK	Zanardi Racing Team	27th
2018	WSK Final Cup — OK		2nd
2019	WSK Champions Cup — OK	CRG Keijzer Racing	6th
2019	German Karting Championship — Senior	CRG Keijzer Racing	4th
2019	WSK Euro Series — OK	CRG Keijzer Racing	23rd
2019	WSK Euro Series — KZ2	CRG Keijzer Racing	DNF
2019	WSK Super Master Series — OK	CRG Keijzer Racing	8th
2019	CIK-FIA European Championship — OK	CRG Keijzer Racing	14th
2019	CIK-FIA European Championship — KZ2	CRG Keijzer Racing	DNF
2019	FIA Karting International Super Cup — KZ2	CRG Keijzer Racing	DNF
2019	CIK-FIA World Championship — OK	CRG Keijzer Racing	11th

== Racing record ==
=== Racing career summary ===
Season	Series	Team	Races	Wins	Poles	F/Laps	Podiums	Points	Position
2020	F4 Spanish Championship	MP Motorsport	21	13	12	10	17	383	**1st**
2020	Formula Renault Eurocup	MP Motorsport	4	0	0	0	0	0	NC†
2021	Formula Regional European Championship	MP Motorsport	20	0	0	0	0	35	16th
2022	Formula Regional European Championship	Van Amersfoort Racing	20	2	1	2	5	186	5th
2023	Formula Regional European Championship	Van Amersfoort Racing	20	2	2	4	5	174	4th
2024	Porsche Supercup	Uniserver by Team GP Elite	8	0	0	0	1	73	8th
2024	Porsche Carrera Cup Germany	Team GP Elite	16	1	1	1	3	137	7th
2024	Porsche Sprint Challenge Southern Europe - Pro	Team GP Elite	4	2	0	0	2	63	5th
2025	Porsche Carrera Cup Germany	GP Elite	12	0	0	0	1	126	9th
2025	Porsche Supercup	GP Elite	6	0	0	0	1	43	11th

^{†} As Haverkort was a guest driver he was ineligible for points.
* Season still in progress.

=== Complete F4 Spanish Championship results ===
(key) (Races in bold indicate pole position) (Races in italics indicate fastest lap)

Year	Team	1	2	3	4	5	6	7	8	9	10	11	12	13	14	15	16	17	18	19	20	21	DC	Points
2020	MP Motorsport	**NAV**; **1**; 1	**NAV**; **2**; 1	NAV; 3; 1	LEC; 1; 2	LEC; 2 Ret	LEC; 3; 4	JER; 1 Ret	JER; 2; 17	**JER**; **3**; 1	**CRT**; **1**; 1	**CRT**; **2**; 1	**CRT**; **3**; 1	ARA; 1; 2	ARA; 2; 3	**ARA**; **3**; 1	**JAR**; **1**; 1	**JAR**; **2**; 1	**JAR**; **3**; 1	**CAT**; **1**; 1	**CAT**; **2**; 1	CAT; 3; 2	1st	383

=== Complete Formula Renault Eurocup results ===
(key) (Races in bold indicate pole position) (Races in italics indicate fastest lap)

Year	Team	1	2	3	4	5	6	7	8	9	10	11	12	13	14	15	16	17	18	19	20	Pos	Points
2020	MP Motorsport	MNZ; 1	MNZ; 2	IMO; 1	IMO; 2	NÜR; 1	NÜR; 2	MAG; 1	MAG; 2	ZAN; 1	ZAN; 2	CAT; 1; 9	CAT; 2; 5	SPA; 1; 5	SPA; 2; 5	IMO; 1	IMO; 2	HOC; 1	HOC; 2	LEC; 1	LEC; 2	NC†	0

† As Haverkort was a guest driver, he was ineligible for points

=== Complete Formula Regional European Championship results ===
(key) (Races in bold indicate pole position) (Races in italics indicate fastest lap)

Year	Team	1	2	3	4	5	6	7	8	9	10	11	12	13	14	15	16	17	18	19	20	DC	Points
2021	MP Motorsport	IMO; 1 Ret	IMO; 2; 25	CAT; 1 Ret	CAT; 2; 17	MCO; 1; 14	MCO; 2; 11	LEC; 1; 7	LEC; 2; 15	ZAN; 1; 18	ZAN; 2; 6	SPA; 1; 14	SPA; 2; 18	RBR; 1; 29	RBR; 2 Ret	VAL; 1; 15	VAL; 2; 14	MUG; 1; 10	MUG; 2; 7	MNZ; 1; 11	MNZ; 2; 4	16th	35
2022	Van Amersfoort Racing	MNZ; 1; 5	MNZ; 2; 4	IMO; 1; 5	IMO; 2 DSQ	MCO; 1; 3	MCO; 2; 4	LEC; 1; 9	LEC; 2; 2	ZAN; 1; 2	ZAN; 2; 15	**HUN**; **1**; 1	HUN; 2; 12	SPA; 1; 7	SPA; 2; 12	RBR; 1; 1	RBR; 2; 14	CAT; 1; 4	CAT; 2; 5	MUG; 1; 6	MUG; 2; 10	5th	186
2023	Van Amersfoort Racing	IMO; 1; 5	IMO; 2; 1	CAT; 1; 3	CAT; 2; 13	HUN; 1; 2	HUN; 2 Ret	SPA; 1; 12	SPA; 2; 7	MUG; 1; 4	MUG; 2; 5	LEC; 1; 12	LEC; 2; 11	RBR; 1; 5	RBR; 2; 7	MNZ; 1 Ret	MNZ; 2; 7	**ZAN**; **1**; 1	ZAN; 2; 14	**HOC**; **1**; 5	HOC; 2; 3	4th	174

=== Complete Porsche Carrera Cup Germany results ===
(key) (Races in bold indicate pole position) (Races in italics indicate fastest lap)

Year	Team	1	2	3	4	5	6	7	8	9	10	11	12	13	14	15	16	DC	Points
2024	UNISERVER by Team GP Elite	IMO; 1; 7	IMO; 2 Ret	OSC; 1; 13	OSC; 2; 5	ZAN; 1; 4	ZAN; 2; 6	HUN; 1; 8	**HUN**; **2**; 1	NÜR; 1; 25	NÜR; 2; 12	SAC; 1; 8	SAC; 2; 10	RBR; 1; 2	RBR; 2; 3	HOC; 1; 20	HOC; 2; 13	7th	137
2025	Team GP Elite	IMO; 1; 7	IMO; 2; 6	SPA; 1; 5	SPA; 2; 6	ZAN; 1; 6	ZAN; 2; 5	NOR; 1; 6	NOR; 2; 3	NÜR; 1; 14	NÜR; 2; 6	SAC; 1; 4	SAC; 2; 4	RBR; 1	RBR; 2	HOC; 1	HOC; 2	9th	126

=== Complete Porsche Supercup results ===
(key) (Races in bold indicate pole position) (Races in italics indicate fastest lap)

Year	Team	1	2	3	4	5	6	7	8	Pos.	Points
2024	Universer by Team GP Elite	IMO; 6	MON; 4	RBR; 5	SIL; 7	HUN; 3	SPA; 17	ZAN; 6	MNZ; 29†	8th	73
2025	GP Elite	IMO; 3	MON; Ret	CAT; 10	RBR; 11	SPA; Ret	HUN; 4	ZAN	MNZ	11th	43

Sporting positions
Preceded by Franco Colapinto	F4 Spanish Championship; Champion; 2020	Succeeded by Dilano van 't Hoff
