= Scott Kin Lindblom =

Swedish racing driver (born 2010)

Scott Lindblom
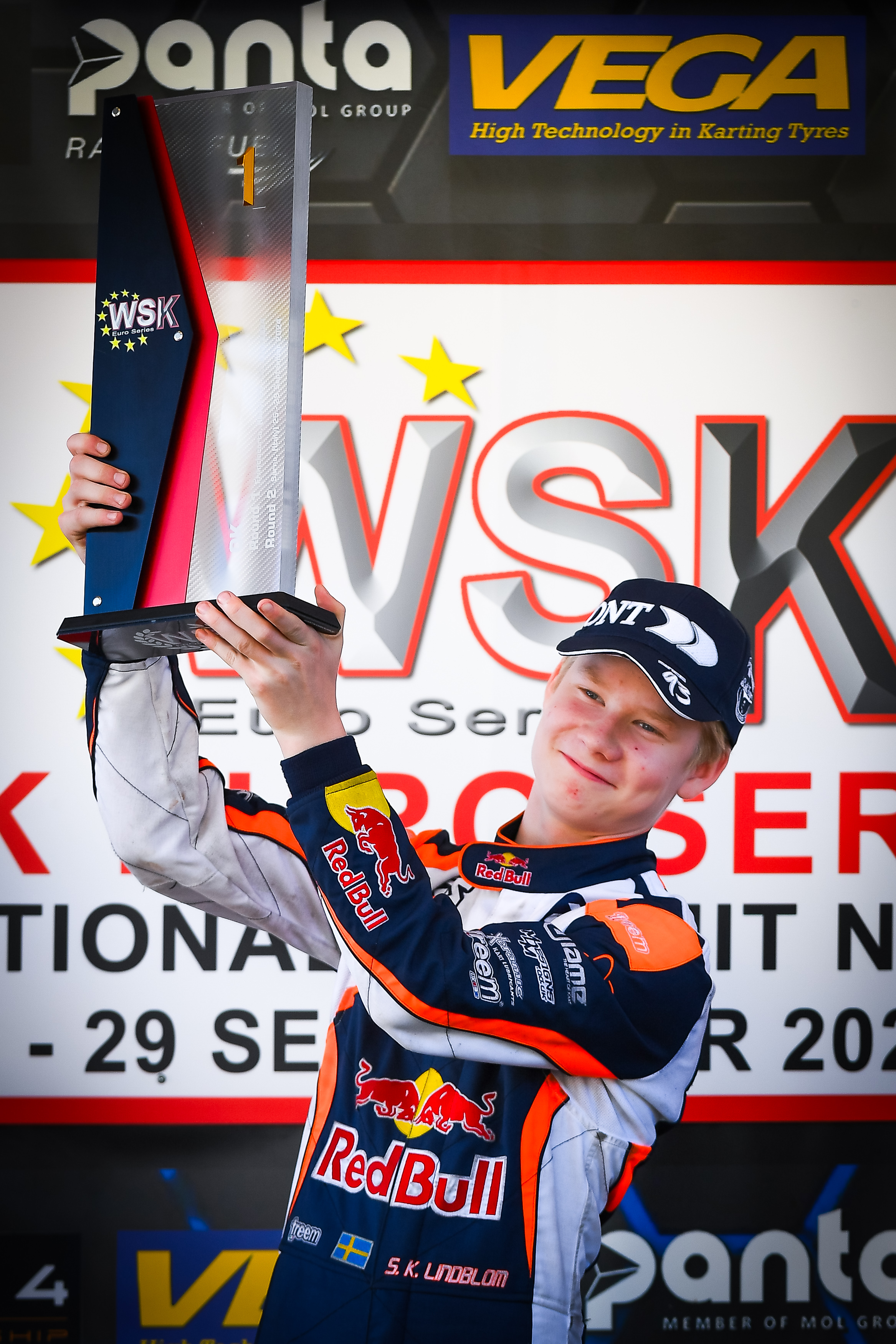
- Lindblom in 2024
- Nationality: (Sweden) Swedish
- Born: 5 August 2010 (age 16) Falun, Sweden

Scott Kin Lindblom (born 5 August 2010) is a Swedish racing driver who last competed for Hitech in the F4 British Championship as a member of the Red Bull Junior Team.

== Career ==
=== Karting (2017–2024) ===
Lindblom discovered karting in 2015, but began racing competitively two years later. Primarily racing in Sweden in his youth, Lindblom won the 2019 MKR Series Sweden title in the micro category, before clinching his second MKR title two years later in Junior 60. Moving to international competitions full-time in 2022, Lindblom began finding notable success the following year in OK-J, finishing fourth in the WSK Euro Series and third in the Karting World Championship for Tony Kart Racing Team. In his final year of karting in 2024, Lindblom moved up to senior karts mid-season with Fusion Motorsport, achieving his only international title in the WSK Euro Series.

=== Ginetta Juniors (2024–2025) ===
In late 2024, Lindblom made his car racing debut, competing in the Ginetta Junior Winter Series for R Racing. Continuing in the main series in 2025, Lindblom began the year with a podium in each of the first four rounds, before ending the season with five other podiums in the final two rounds to secure fourth in points, 219 points behind champion Rocco Coronel. During 2025, Lindblom also raced part-time in the Ginetta Nordic Challenge, in which he won all four races he started.

=== Formula 4 (2025–present) ===
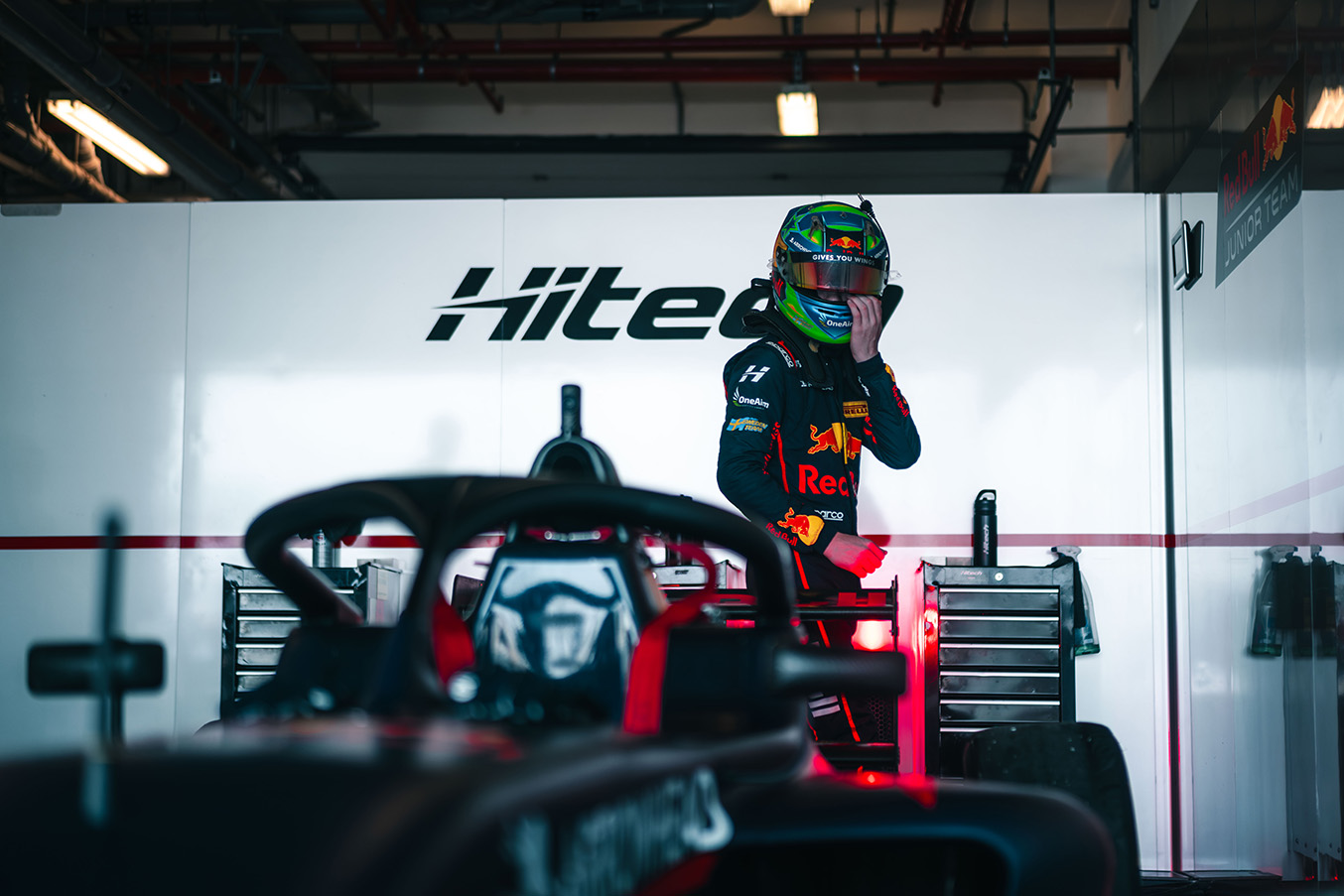
Lindblom inside the Hitech garage at Yas Marina Circuit in 2025.

In late 2025, Lindblom made his single-seater debut in the Hitech centrally-run F4 Saudi Arabian Championship. Competing in the first four rounds, Lindblom scored a lone win at Jeddah and four other podiums to secure a third-place points finish. Lindblom skipped the final round to contest the three-round Formula Trophy with the same team, in which he took two podiums at Yas Marina to end the season ninth overall.

Continuing with Hitech for 2026, Lindblom remained in the Middle East at the start of the year to compete in the UAE4 Series. In the four-round series, Lindblom took his maiden career pole at the second Yas Marina round, where he also got his only podiums of the season, en route to a seventh-place points finish. For the rest of the year, Lindblom remained with the team to race in the F4 British Championship, where he began the season with a double podium at Donington Park. Lindblom then finished second in race one at Snetterton, a result he matched two rounds later at Zandvoort. Lindblom then took his only win of the season in the reverse-grid race at Donington Park and scored a podium at Croft to end the year seventh despite missing a round after accumulating 12 penalty points. At the end of the year, he joined Campos Racing to partake in the F4 World Cup.

=== Formula One ===
During his final year of karting, Lindblom joined the Red Bull Junior Team after entering their Driver Search programme during the summer.

== Karting record ==
=== Karting career summary ===
Season	Series	Team	Position
2020	WSK Super Master Series — 60 Mini	CRG Racing Team	75th
2021	WSK Champions Cup — 60 Mini	CRG Racing Team	89th
2021	WSK Super Master Series — 60 Mini	CRG Racing Team; Gamoto ASD (Note: Lindblom competed for CRG Racing Team in round 1 and for Gamoto ASD in round 3.)	108th
2021	WSK Euro Series — 60 Mini	Gamoto ASD	41st
2021	Andrea Margutti Trophy — 60 Mini	Gamoto ASD	32nd
2021	WSK Open Cup — 60 Mini	Gamoto ASD	10th
2021	Trofeo Delle Industrie — 60 Mini	Gamoto ASD	32nd
2021	WSK Final Cup — 60 Mini	Gamoto ASD	17th
2022	WSK Champions Cup — Mini Gr.3	Gamoto SRL	15th
2022	WSK Super Master Series — Mini Gr.3	Gamoto SRL	17th
2022	Andrea Margutti Trophy — Mini Gr.3	Gamoto SRL	4th
2022	Champions of the Future Euro Series — OK-J	CRG Racing Team	88th
2022	Karting European Championship — OK-J	CRG Racing Team	82nd
2022	WSK Euro Series — OK-J	CRG Racing Team	17th
2022	Italian Karting Championship — OK-J	CRG Racing Team	30th
2022	Karting World Championship — OK-J	CRG Racing Team	36th
2022	WSK Open Cup — OK-J	CRG Racing Team	23rd
2022	Trofeo Delle Industrie — OK-J	CRG Racing Team	NC
2022	WSK Final Cup — OK-J	CRG Racing Team	52nd
2023	WSK Super Master Series — OK-J	Tony Kart Racing Team	12th
2023	Champions of the Future Euro Series — OK-J	Tony Kart Racing Team	11th
2023	Karting European Championship — OK-J	Tony Kart Racing Team	15th
2023	WSK Euro Series — OK-J	Tony Kart Racing Team	4th
2023	Karting World Championship — OK-J	Tony Kart Racing Team	3rd
2023	WSK Final Cup — OK-J	Tony Kart Racing Team	45th
2024	WSK Super Master Series — OK-J	Tony Kart Racing Team	11th
2024	Champions of the Future Euro Series — OK-J	Tony Kart Racing Team; Fusion Motorsport (Note: Lindblom competed for Tony Kart Racing Team in round 1 and for Fusion Motorsport in round 2.)	48th
2024	Karting European Championship — OK-J	Tony Kart Racing Team	32nd
2024	IAME Euro Series — X30 Junior	Fusion Motorsport	11th
2024	Champions of the Future Euro Series — OK	Fusion Motorsport	8th
2024	Karting European Championship — OK	Fusion Motorsport	93rd
2024	WSK Euro Series — OK	Fusion Motorsport	1st
2024	Karting World Championship — OK	Fusion Motorsport	30th
2024	WSK Final Cup — OK	Fusion Motorsport	51st

== Racing record ==
=== Racing career summary ===
Season	Series	Team	Races	Wins	Poles	F/Laps	Podiums	Points	Position
2024	Ginetta Junior Winter Series	R Racing	3	0	0	0	0	16	14th
2025	Ginetta Junior Championship	R Racing	24	0	0	3	8	441	4th
2025	Ginetta Nordic Challenge		4	4			4		
2025	F4 Saudi Arabian Championship	Red Bull	10	1	0	0	5	108	**3rd**
2025	Formula Trophy	Hitech TGR	7	0	0	0	2	46	9th
2026	UAE4 Series	Hitech	12	0	1	0	2	71	7th
2026	F4 British Championship	Hitech	27	1	0	2	7	151	7th
2026	FIA F4 World Cup	Campos Racing						—N/a	

* Season still in progress.

=== Complete Ginetta Junior Championship results ===
(key) (Races in bold indicate pole position; races in italics indicate fastest lap)

Year	Entrant	1	2	3	4	5	6	7	8	9	10	11	12	13	14	15	16	17	18	19	20	21	22	23	24	Pos	Points
2025	R Racing	DON1; 1; 3	DON1; 2; 17	DON1; 3; 20	SIL; 1; 3	SIL; 2; 9	SIL; 3; 5	OUL; 1; 2	OUL; 2; 14	OUL; 3; 6	SNE; 1; 3	SNE; 2 DSQ	SNE; 3; 5	ZAN; 1; 4	ZAN; 2; 5	ZAN; 3 Ret	BRH; 1; 6	BRH; 2; 7	BRH; 3; 4	CRO; 1; 3	CRO; 2; 4	CRO; 3; 2	DON2; 1; 3	DON2; 2; 3	DON2; 3; 3	4th	441

=== Complete F4 Saudi Arabian Championship results ===
(key) (Races in bold indicate pole position) (Races in italics indicate fastest lap)

Year	Entrant	1	2	3	4	5	6	7	8	9	10	Pos	Points
2025	Red Bull	BHR1; 1; 5	BHR1; 2; 5	BHR2; 1; 2	BHR2; 2; 3	JED1; 1; 3	JED1; 2; 1	JED2; 1; 3	JED2; 2; 14	JED3; 1	JED3; 2	3rd	108

=== Complete Formula Trophy results ===
(key) (Races in bold indicate pole position; races in italics indicate fastest lap)

Year	Entrant	1	2	3	4	5	6	7	Pos	Points
2025	Hitech TGR	DUB; 1; 11	DUB; 2; 8	DUB; 3 Ret	YMC1; 1; 16	YMC1; 2; 4	YMC2; 1; 3	YMC2; 2; 3	9th	46

=== Complete UAE4 Series results ===
(key) (Races in bold indicate pole position; races in italics indicate fastest lap)

Year	Entrant	1	2	3	4	5	6	7	8	9	10	11	12	Pos	Points
2026	Hitech	YMC1; 1; 14	YMC1; 2; 8	YMC1; 3; 7	**YMC2**; **1**; 3	YMC2; 2; 30	YMC2; 3; 3	DUB; 1 Ret	DUB; 2; 10	DUB; 3; 7	LUS; 1; 5	LUS; 2; 9	LUS; 3; 4	7th	71

=== Complete F4 British Championship results ===
(key) (Races in bold indicate pole position) (Races in italics indicate fastest lap)

Year	Entrant	1	2	3	4	5	6	7	8	9	10	11	12	13	14	15	16	17	18	19	20	21	22	23	24	25	26	27	28	29	30	Pos	Points
2026	Hitech	DPN; 1; 6	DPN; 2; 3^{2}	DPN; 3; 3	BHI; 1; 8	BHI; 2; 11^{7}	BHI; 3; 14	SNE; 1; 2	SNE; 2; 6^{2}	SNE; 3; 4	SILGP; 1; 10	SILGP; 2; 16^{5}	SILGP; 3; 22	ZAN; 1; 3	ZAN; 2; 5^{6}	ZAN; 3; 2	THR; 1; 6	THR; 2 Ret	THR; 3 Ret	DPGP; 1; 12	DPGP; 2; 1^{1}	DPGP; 3; 6	CRO; 1; 8	CRO; 2; 2^{1}	CRO; 3; 22	SILN; 1	SILN; 2	SILN; 3	BHGP; 1; 7	BHGP; 2; 24	BHGP; 3; 5	7th	151

* Season still in progress.
