= 2025 Ginetta Junior Championship =

British one make automobile racing championship

The 2025 Michelin Ginetta Junior Championship was a multi-event, one make motor racing championship held across England. The championship included a mix of professional teams and privately funded drivers, aged between 14 and 17, competing in Ginetta G40s that are conformed to the technical regulations for the championship.

== Teams and drivers ==
Team	No.	Driver	Rounds
MKH Racing	3	(Spain) Raúl Zunzarren	1–7
MKH Racing	73	(United Kingdom) Harry Bartle	1–3
ProjectR	4	(United Kingdom) Lewis Goff	6–8
ProjectR	17	(United Kingdom) Max Murray	4–6
ProjectR	26	(United Kingdom) Jesse Phillips	8
Elite Motorsport	5	(Belgium) Emmilio Valentino del Grosso	All
Elite Motorsport	15	(United Kingdom) Joseph Smith	1–4
Elite Motorsport	40	(Republic of Ireland) Joshua Henry	5–8
Elite Motorsport	51	(United Kingdom) Fred Green	All
Elite Motorsport	53	(United States) Ethan Carney	All
Elite Motorsport	75	(Republic of Ireland) Colin Cronin	All
Elite Motorsport	83	(United Kingdom) Revie Lake	All
E3 Sport	6	(United Kingdom) Andrew Robinson	4, 6, 8
R Racing	7	(Netherlands) Felipe Reijs	All
R Racing	8	(Sweden) Scott Kin Lindblom	All
R Racing	23	(Netherlands) Rocco Coronel	All
R Racing	27	(United Kingdom) Alfie Slater	1–7
R Racing	34	(United Kingdom) Max Cuthbert	All
R Racing	55	(United Kingdom) Jarrett Clark	All
Fox Motorsport	11	(United Kingdom) Henry Cameron	All
Fox Motorsport	67	(United Kingdom) Freddie Lloyd	1–3
Tim Gray Motorsport	13	(Hong Kong) Katrina Ee	1–6
Tim Gray Motorsport	21	(Zimbabwe) Matthew Chiwara	All
Tim Gray Motorsport	22	(United Kingdom) Joshua Watts	1–5
Tim Gray Motorsport	40	(Republic of Ireland) Joshua Henry	1–4
Pace Performance	18	(United Kingdom) Torrin Byrne	All
Pace Performance	32	(South Africa) Ethan Lennon	1–5
Pace Performance	67	(United Kingdom) Vladislav Tomenchuk	8
Pace Performance	73	(United Kingdom) Harry Bartle	4–8
RAB Sport	19	(South Africa) Mahlori Mabunda	1
RAB Sport	20	(South Africa) Ntiyiso Mabunda	1
Performance One Racing	22	(United Kingdom) Joshua Watts	6–8
Performance One Racing	95	(United Kingdom) Noah Young	All
MDD Racing	25	(Australia) George Proudford-Nalder	All
MDD Racing	31	(United Kingdom) Felix Livesey	1–4

- Luviwe Sambudla was scheduled to compete for RAB Sport, but did not appear at any rounds.

== Calendar ==
All rounds are scheduled to run alongside the British GT Championship apart from the round at Zandvoort and the round at Croft.

Round	Circuit	Date
1	(United Kingdom) Donington Park, Leicestershire (Grand Prix Circuit)	5–6 April
2	(United Kingdom) Silverstone, Northamptonshire (Grand Prix Circuit)	26–27 April
3	(United Kingdom) Oulton Park, Cheshire (International Circuit)	24–25 May
4	(United Kingdom) Snetterton, Norfolk (300 Circuit)	12–13 July
5	(Netherlands) Zandvoort Circuit, Zandvoort	26–27 July
6	(United Kingdom) Brands Hatch, Kent (Grand Prix Circuit)	23–24 August
7	(United Kingdom) Croft Circuit, North Yorkshire	6–7 September
8	(United Kingdom) Donington Park, Leicestershire (Grand Prix Circuit)	4–5 October

== Race results ==
Round		Circuit	Date	Pole position	Fastest lap	Winning driver	Winning team	Rookie Winner
1	R1	(United Kingdom) Donington Park, Leicestershire (Grand Prix Circuit)	5–6 April	(United Kingdom) Fred Green	(United Kingdom) Alfie Slater	(United Kingdom) Alfie Slater	R Racing	(United Kingdom) Fred Green
1	R2	(United Kingdom) Donington Park, Leicestershire (Grand Prix Circuit)	5–6 April	(United Kingdom) Alfie Slater	(Netherlands) Rocco Coronel	(Netherlands) Rocco Coronel	R Racing	(Netherlands) Rocco Coronel
1	R3	(United Kingdom) Donington Park, Leicestershire (Grand Prix Circuit)	5–6 April		(United Kingdom) Alfie Slater	(Netherlands) Rocco Coronel	R Racing	(Netherlands) Rocco Coronel
2	R1	(United Kingdom) Silverstone, Northamptonshire (Grand Prix Circuit)	26–27 April	(United Kingdom) Torrin Byrne	(Netherlands) Rocco Coronel	(Netherlands) Rocco Coronel	R Racing	(Netherlands) Rocco Coronel
2	R2	(United Kingdom) Silverstone, Northamptonshire (Grand Prix Circuit)	26–27 April	(United Kingdom) Fred Green	(Australia) George Proudford-Nalder	(Netherlands) Rocco Coronel	R Racing	(Netherlands) Rocco Coronel
2	R3	(United Kingdom) Silverstone, Northamptonshire (Grand Prix Circuit)	26–27 April		(Netherlands) Rocco Coronel	(Netherlands) Rocco Coronel	R Racing	(Netherlands) Rocco Coronel
3	R1	(United Kingdom) Oulton Park, Cheshire (International Circuit)	24–25 May	(Netherlands) Rocco Coronel	(Sweden) Scott Kin Lindblom	(Netherlands) Rocco Coronel	R Racing	(Netherlands) Rocco Coronel
3	R2	(United Kingdom) Oulton Park, Cheshire (International Circuit)	24–25 May	(Netherlands) Rocco Coronel	(United States) Ethan Carney	(Netherlands) Rocco Coronel	R Racing	(Netherlands) Rocco Coronel
3	R3	(United Kingdom) Oulton Park, Cheshire (International Circuit)	24–25 May		(United Kingdom) Fred Green	(United Kingdom) Fred Green	Elite Motorsport	(United Kingdom) Fred Green
4	R1	(United Kingdom) Snetterton, Norfolk (300 Circuit)	12–13 July	(United Kingdom) Fred Green	(Netherlands) Rocco Coronel	(United Kingdom) Fred Green	Elite Motorsport	(United Kingdom) Fred Green
4	R2	(United Kingdom) Snetterton, Norfolk (300 Circuit)	12–13 July	(United Kingdom) Fred Green	(United Kingdom) Joseph Smith	(Netherlands) Rocco Coronel	R Racing	(Netherlands) Rocco Coronel
4	R3	(United Kingdom) Snetterton, Norfolk (300 Circuit)	12–13 July		(United Kingdom) Alfie Slater	(Netherlands) Rocco Coronel	R Racing	(Netherlands) Rocco Coronel
5	R1	(Netherlands) Zandvoort Circuit, Zandvoort	26–27 July	(Netherlands) Rocco Coronel	(United Kingdom) Fred Green	(Netherlands) Rocco Coronel	R Racing	(Netherlands) Rocco Coronel
5	R2	(Netherlands) Zandvoort Circuit, Zandvoort	26–27 July	(United Kingdom) Torrin Byrne	(United Kingdom) Max Cuthbert	(Netherlands) Rocco Coronel	R Racing	(Netherlands) Rocco Coronel
5	R3	(Netherlands) Zandvoort Circuit, Zandvoort	26–27 July		(United Kingdom) Alfie Slater	(United Kingdom) Alfie Slater	R Racing	(Netherlands) Rocco Coronel
6	R1	(United Kingdom) Brands Hatch, Kent (Grand Prix Circuit)	23–24 August	(United Kingdom) Max Cuthbert	(Netherlands) Rocco Coronel	(United Kingdom) Fred Green	Elite Motorsport	(United Kingdom) Fred Green
6	R2	(United Kingdom) Brands Hatch, Kent (Grand Prix Circuit)	23–24 August	(United Kingdom) Fred Green	Not recognised (Note: The fastest lap was not recognised after the race was not resumed following a red flag on lap two after an incident in the opening lap.)	(United Kingdom) Alfie Slater	R Racing	(United Kingdom) Fred Green
6	R3	(United Kingdom) Brands Hatch, Kent (Grand Prix Circuit)	23–24 August		(United Kingdom) Max Cuthbert	(United Kingdom) Fred Green	Elite Motorsport	(United Kingdom) Fred Green
7	R1	(United Kingdom) Croft Circuit, North Yorkshire	6–7 September	(United Kingdom) Fred Green	(Sweden) Scott Kin Lindblom	(United Kingdom) Fred Green	Elite Motorsport	(United Kingdom) Fred Green
7	R2	(United Kingdom) Croft Circuit, North Yorkshire	6–7 September	(United Kingdom) Fred Green	(Australia) George Proudford-Nalder	(United Kingdom) Fred Green	Elite Motorsport	(United Kingdom) Fred Green
7	R3	(United Kingdom) Croft Circuit, North Yorkshire	6–7 September		(Sweden) Scott Kin Lindblom	(United Kingdom) Fred Green	Elite Motorsport	(United Kingdom) Fred Green
8	R1	(United Kingdom) Donington Park, Leicestershire (Grand Prix Circuit)	4–5 October	(Netherlands) Rocco Coronel	(Australia) George Proudford-Nalder	(United Kingdom) Max Cuthbert	R Racing	(United Kingdom) Max Cuthbert
8	R2	(United Kingdom) Donington Park, Leicestershire (Grand Prix Circuit)	4–5 October	(Netherlands) Rocco Coronel	(Republic of Ireland) Colin Cronin	(United Kingdom) Fred Green	Elite Motorsport	(United Kingdom) Fred Green
8	R3	(United Kingdom) Donington Park, Leicestershire (Grand Prix Circuit)	4–5 October		(United Kingdom) Jarrett Clark	(United Kingdom) Fred Green	Elite Motorsport	(United Kingdom) Fred Green

== Championship standings ==
Points system
1st	2nd	3rd	4th	5th	6th	7th	8th	9th	10th	11th	12th	13th	14th	15th	16th	17th	18th	19th	20th	R1 PP	FL
35	30	26	22	20	18	16	14	12	11	10	9	8	7	6	5	4	3	2	1	1	1

=== Drivers' championship ===
Pos	Driver	DON1 (United Kingdom)			SIL (United Kingdom)			OUL (United Kingdom)			SNE (United Kingdom)			ZAN (Netherlands)			BRA (United Kingdom)			CRO (United Kingdom)			DON2 (United Kingdom)			Total	Drop	Pen.	Points
1	(Netherlands) Rocco Coronel (R)	6	1	1	1	1	1	1	1	2	2	1	1	1	1	2	3	3	2	8	3	3	4	DNS	DNS	660			660
2	(United Kingdom) Fred Green (R)	2	2	19	2	Ret	7	3	2	1	1	5	2	2	4	5	1	2	1	1	1	1	2	1	1	656	2	6	648
3	(United Kingdom) Max Cuthbert (R)	7	6	3	14	Ret	6	10	7	3	4	4	4	5	2	3	2	6	7	7	18	6	1	10	5	442	3	6	433
4	(Sweden) Scott Kin Lindblom (R)	3	17	20	3	9	5	2	14	6	3	DSQ	5	4	5	Ret	6	7	4	3	4	2	3	3	3	441	1	12	428
5	(United Kingdom) Alfie Slater	1	9	2	4	6	2	4	13	5	6	8	6	3	3	1	4	1	3	DSQ	5	10				438		21	417
6	(Republic of Ireland) Colin Cronin	4	7	5	10	5	Ret	6	10	DSQ	7	6	11	10	8	6	5	5	5	2	8	5	9	4	4	378	10	39	329
7	(Australia) George Proudford-Nalder (R)	DSQ	24	Ret	5	4	4	7	3	19	Ret	7	9	7	7	4	9	9	8	4	2	9	Ret	8	Ret	303		9	294
8	(United Kingdom) Jarrett Clark (R)	11	13	7	13	7	10	11	9	8	15	12	16	13	6	7	7	10	9	14	11	7	5	2	2	316	11	18	287
9	(United Kingdom) Torrin Byrne	10	3	6	12	Ret	14	14	8	14	18	3	10	6	Ret	11	15	11	6	9	10	8	12	9	8	270			270
10	(United Kingdom) Joseph Smith (R)	5	4	11	11	2	3	5	12	Ret	5	2	3													224		12	212
11	(United States) Ethan Carney	22	18	DSQ	6	3	19	9	4	11	9	15	14	9	11	Ret	21	8	Ret	6	9	4	Ret	16	9	219		12	207
12	(United Kingdom) Harry Bartle (R)	12	19	10	16	16	12	13	20	18	8	DSQ	13	12	Ret	10	10	4	Ret	19	6	Ret	8	5	6	193		9	184
13	(South Africa) Ethan Lennon (R)	8	5	9	8	Ret	11	Ret	5	4	10	11	7	Ret	12	Ret										158		9	149
14	(Spain) Raúl Zunzarren (R)	17	15	13	18	15	13	16	11	9	12	17	8	11	9	8	14	17	14	10	12	Ret				159		30	129
15	(United Kingdom) Revie Lake (R)	24	16	Ret	15	11	Ret	Ret	17	13	14	9	12	16	10	9	11	16	17	18	14	13	13	12	11	149		24	125
16	(United Kingdom) Freddie Lloyd (R)	9	8	4	9	8	9	8	6	Ret																118			118
17	(United Kingdom) Lewis Goff (R)																13	19	10	5	7	12	6	6	7	116			116
18	(Belgium) Emmilio Valentino del Grosso (R)	13	11	8	7	17	17	17	23	10	16	13	19	14	13	12	18	15	11	13	20	11	10	Ret	DNS	154		57	97
19	(Republic of Ireland) Joshua Henry	23	21	17	20	Ret	20	20	21	Ret	20	20	18	17	15	16	12	12	12	12	17	14	16	11	12	95			95
20	(Netherlands) Felipe Reijs (R)	14	12	14	24	12	15	18	15	12	19	16	Ret	8	14	Ret	16	18	16	17	19	15	WD	WD	WD	106		15	91
21	(United Kingdom) Noah Young (R)	16	10	Ret	22	13	18	15	19	16	25	14	24	20	Ret	15	20	13	15	20	13	16	7	13	10	112		24	88
22	(United Kingdom) Henry Cameron (R)	15	Ret	15	21	18	16	19	18	15	21	18	21	18	17	17	23	20	20	15	15	18	14	14	14	83			83
23	(United Kingdom) Joshua Watts	Ret	Ret	12	17	14	23	Ret	16	20	13	Ret	20	19	Ret	Ret	8	14	13	11	Ret	Ret	11	7	Ret	98		21	77
24	(Zimbabwe) Matthew Chiwara (R)	20	23	18	19	19	21	21	24	17	24	21	22	Ret	18	14	22	22	18	16	16	17	15	15	16	56			56
25	(United Kingdom) Felix Livesey	DSQ	Ret	Ret	Ret	10	8	12	Ret	7	11	23	15													66		15	51
26	(United Kingdom) Max Murray (R)										17	10	17	15	16	Ret	17	Ret	DNS							34		6	28
27	(United Kingdom) Jesse Phillips (R)																						17	19	13	14			14
28	(Hong Kong) Katrina Ee (R)	21	22	Ret	23	20	22	22	22	NC	22	22	23	21	19	13	24	Ret	DNS							12			12
29	(United Kingdom) Vladislav Tomenchuk (R)																						18	18	17	10			10
30	(South Africa) Mahlori Mabunda	18	20	16																						9			9
31	(United Kingdom) Andrew Robinson (R)										23	19	25				19	21	19				Ret	17	15	16		12	4
32	(South Africa) Ntiyiso Mabunda	19	14	Ret																						9		9	0

== Ginetta Junior Winter Series ==
=== Teams and drivers ===
Team	No.	Driver
MKH Racing	3	(Spain) Raúl Zunzarren
R Racing	4	(United Kingdom) Lewis Goff
R Racing	5	(United States) Emma Scarbrough
R Racing	8	(Singapore) Jamie Ambrose
R Racing	26	(United Kingdom) Jesse Phillips
R Racing	36	(United Kingdom) Sebastien Leusch
R Racing	54	(United Kingdom) Riley Cranham
R Racing	55	(Australia) Jarrett Clark
Elite Motorsport	11	(United Kingdom) Henry Cameron
Elite Motorsport	46	(United Kingdom) Jacob Ashcroft
Elite Motorsport	74	(United Kingdom) Kai Veitch
Elite Motorsport	75	(Republic of Ireland) Colin Cronin
Elite Motorsport	83	(United Kingdom) Revie Lake
MDD Racing	13	(United Kingdom) Savva Solonchenko (Note: Solonchenko is a Russian driver competing under a British licence.)
MDD Racing	17	(United Kingdom) Luke Walton
Pace Performance	18	(United Kingdom) Torrin Byrne
Pace Performance	67	(United Kingdom) Vladislav Tomenchuk
Pace Performance	73	(United Kingdom) Harry Bartle
Performance One Racing	22	(United Kingdom) Joshua Watts
Performance One Racing	95	(United Kingdom) Noah Young

=== Championship standings ===
Points system
1st	2nd	3rd	4th	5th	6th	7th	8th	9th	10th	11th	12th	13th	14th	15th	16th	17th	18th	19th	20th	R1 PP	FL
35	30	26	22	20	18	16	14	12	11	10	9	8	7	6	5	4	3	2	1	1	1

==== Drivers' championship ====
Pos	Driver	SIL			Points
1	(United Kingdom) Jesse Phillips (R)	3	6	4	66
2	(United Kingdom) Lewis Goff (R)	1	4	14	65
3	(United Kingdom) Torrin Byrne	2	5	10	62
4	(Australia) Jarrett Clark	5	1	Ret	56
5	(Republic of Ireland) Colin Cronin	14	2	9	50
6	(United Kingdom) Harry Bartle	8	3	12	49
7	(Spain) Raúl Zunzarren	17	8	2	48
8	(United Kingdom) Noah Young	4	Ret	3	48
9	(United Kingdom) Jacob Ashcroft (R)	7	10	5	47
10	(United Kingdom) Riley Cranham (R)	Ret	13	1	43
11	(United Kingdom) Henry Cameron	10	9	7	39
12	(United Kingdom) Sebastien Leusch (R)	11	15	6	34
13	(United Kingdom) Josh Watts	9	DSQ	18	33
14	(United Kingdom) Kai Veitch (R)	16	12	8	28
15	(Singapore) Jamie Ambrose (R)	15	11	11	26
16	(United Kingdom) Revie Lake	6	Ret	15	24
17	(United States) Emma Scarbrough	12	14	13	24
18	(United Kingdom) Vladislav Tomenchuk (R)	13	15	19	15
19	(United Kingdom) Savva Solonchenko (R)	18	16	16	13
20	(United Kingdom) Luke Walton (R)	Ret	18	17	7
