= 2026 Supercar Challenge =

Twenty-sixth season of the Supercar Challenge

The 2026 Supercar Challenge powered by Hankook is the twenty-sixth Supercar Challenge season since it replaced the Supercar Cup in 2001. It began at Circuit Zandvoort 18 April and will end at TT Circuit Assen on 25 October.

== Calendar ==
Round	Circuit	Date	Event	Map of circuit locations
1	Circuit Zandvoort, Netherlands	18–19 April	Spring Races	2026 Supercar Challenge is located in Benelux 2026 Supercar Challenge is located in Germany
2	Circuit de Spa-Francorchamps, Belgium	30–31 May	Spa Euro Races	2026 Supercar Challenge is located in Benelux 2026 Supercar Challenge is located in Germany
3	Circuit Zolder, Belgium	27–28 June	Supercar Madness	2026 Supercar Challenge is located in Benelux 2026 Supercar Challenge is located in Germany
4	TT Circuit Assen, Netherlands	31 July–2 August	JACK'S Racing Days	2026 Supercar Challenge is located in Benelux 2026 Supercar Challenge is located in Germany
5	Hockenheimring, Germany	11–13 September	International GT Open	2026 Supercar Challenge is located in Benelux 2026 Supercar Challenge is located in Germany
6	Circuit Zandvoort, Netherlands	3–4 October	Trophy of the Dunes	2026 Supercar Challenge is located in Benelux 2026 Supercar Challenge is located in Germany
7	TT Circuit Assen, Netherlands	24–25 October	Supercar Madness Finale Races	2026 Supercar Challenge is located in Benelux 2026 Supercar Challenge is located in Germany

== Entries ==
Team	Car	No.	Drivers	Rounds
Radical / Prototype
(Germany) Prototype Masters	Duqueine M30 - D08	33	(Germany) Thomas Ambiel	5
(Netherlands) Zoet Racing	Radical SR3	77	(Netherlands) Mitchell van Dijk	1, 3
(Netherlands) Zoet Racing	Radical SR3	77	(Luxembourg) Alain Berg	1
(Netherlands) Zoet Racing	Radical SR3	77	(United Kingdom) Miles Wragg	3
GT
(Netherlands) Cor Euser Racing	Marcos LM600	100	(Netherlands) Cor Euser	1
(Germany) JB Racing	Callaway Corvette C7 GT3-R	102	(Germany) Jürgen Bender	5
(Netherlands) Koopman Racing	BMW Z4 GT3	103	(Netherlands) Hein Koopman	3–4, 7
(Netherlands) Koopman Racing	BMW M4 GT3	103	(Netherlands) Hein Koopman	6
(Netherlands) Koopman Racing	BMW M4 GT3	123	(Netherlands) Mex Jansen	4
(Netherlands) Koopman Racing	BMW M4 GT3	123	(Netherlands) Rocco Coronel	4
(Netherlands) Koopman Racing	BMW M4 GT3	138	(Canada) Samantha Tan	5
(Netherlands) Koopman Racing	BMW M4 GT3	138	(Netherlands) Hein Koopman	5
(Netherlands) Koopman Racing	BMW M6 GT3	111	(Netherlands) Marlon Birdsall	All
(Netherlands) Koopman Racing	BMW M6 GT3	118	(United Kingdom) Harry Barton	All
(Netherlands) Koopman Racing	BMW M6 GT3	124	(Netherlands) Gilles van Houtum	1–2, 5, 7
(Netherlands) Koopman Racing	BMW M6 GT3	133	(Netherlands) Daan Meijer	1–2, 7
(Netherlands) Koopman Racing	BMW M6 GT3	142	(Netherlands) Wessel Sandkuijl	4–5, 7
(Netherlands) Koopman Racing	BMW M6 GT3	149	(Netherlands) Cees Wijsman	1–2, 6
(Netherlands) Koopman Racing	BMW M6 GT3	150	(Netherlands) Ivar Moens	1–2
(Netherlands) Dekker Racing	Porsche 992 GT3 Cup (992.1)	106	(Netherlands) Marcel Dekker	5
(Netherlands) JR Motorsport	BMW M6 GT3	108	(Netherlands) Ted van Vliet	1, 4–5
(Belgium) Mama's Nightmare	Porsche 992 GT3 Cup (992.1)	112	(Belgium) Wouter Manderveld	3
(Belgium) NGT Racing	Porsche 992 GT3 Cup (992.1)	140	(Belgium) Mathias Bekes	2
(Belgium) NGT Racing	Porsche 992 GT3 Cup (992.1)	140	(Belgium) Lex Quintens	2
(Denmark) Sally Racing	Honda NSX GT3 Evo22	144	(Denmark) Dan Ringsted Jacobsen	4, 7
(Netherlands) RBM Racing	Lamborghini Huracán Super Trofeo EVO2	179	(Netherlands) Richard Blom	4, 6–7
(Netherlands) Pumaxs Racing	Pumaxs RT	181	(Netherlands) Henk Thuis	6–7
Supersport Plus
(Netherlands) Febo Racing Team	Hyundai Elantra N TCR (2024)	201	(Netherlands) Dennis de Borst	All
(Netherlands) Febo Racing Team	Hyundai Elantra N TCR (2024)	201	(Netherlands) Steff de Borst	1–5
(Netherlands) Febo Racing Team	Hyundai Elantra N TCR (2024)	201	(Netherlands) Jaap van Lagen	6
(Germany) NFR Motorsports	BMW M4 GT4 Evo (G82)	203	(Netherlands) Luuk van Wijngaarden	4
(Germany) NFR Motorsports	BMW M4 GT4 Evo (G82)	203	(Netherlands) Thomas Verhoek	4
(Denmark) Sally Racing	Porsche 718 Cayman GT4 RS Clubsport	212	(Denmark) Frank Laursen	4
(Denmark) Sally Racing	Porsche 718 Cayman GT4 RS Clubsport	212	(Denmark) Mikkel Ryberg	4
(Netherlands) Niemann Autosport	BMW M4 GT4 Evo (G82)	222	(Netherlands) Dennis Nelemans	4
(Netherlands) Niemann Autosport	Mclaren Artura Trophy Evo	242	(Netherlands) Albert Jochems	4
(Netherlands) Niemann Autosport	Mclaren Artura Trophy Evo	242	(Netherlands) Charles Zwolsman	4
(Netherlands) CP Motorsport	BMW M4 GT4 Evo (G82)	223	(Belgium) Pieter Jan Lefevre	4
(Netherlands) CP Motorsport	BMW M4 GT4 Evo (G82)	224	(Netherlands) Thijs Wesseling	1
(Netherlands) CP Motorsport	BMW M4 GT4 Evo (G82)	226	(Netherlands) Valentijn Greven	1–3
(Netherlands) CP Motorsport	BMW M4 GT4 Evo (G82)	226	(Netherlands) Ricardo van der Ende	2
(Netherlands) CP Motorsport	BMW M4 GT4 Evo (G82)	281	(Netherlands) Jan van der Kamp	4
(Netherlands) CP Motorsport	BMW M4 GT4 Evo (G82)	281	(Netherlands) Mark Antonides	4
(Netherlands) CP Motorsport	BMW M4 GT4 Evo (G82)	282	(Netherlands) Patrick Grootscholten	2
(Netherlands) CP Motorsport	BMW M4 GT4 Evo (G82)	282	(Netherlands) Daaf Steentjes	2
(Netherlands) CP Motorsport	Mercedes-AMG GT4	282	(Netherlands) Patrick Grootscholten	1
(Netherlands) CP Motorsport	Mercedes-AMG GT4	282	(Netherlands) Daaf Steentjes	1, 4
(Netherlands) CP Motorsport	Mercedes-AMG GT4	283	(Netherlands) Patrick Grootscholten	4
(Netherlands) V8 Racing	Chevrolet Camaro GT4.R	224	(Netherlands) Dante Rappange	7
(Netherlands) V8 Racing	Chevrolet Camaro GT4.R	224	(Netherlands) Jop Rappange	7
(Netherlands) Koopman Racing	BMW M4 GT4 Evo (G82)	235	(Netherlands) Patrick de Vreede	All
(Netherlands) Koopman Racing	BMW M4 GT4 Evo (G82)	235	(Netherlands) Rogier de Leeuw	All
(Netherlands) Koopman Racing	BMW M4 GT4 Evo (G82)	236	(Austria) Nikolaus Pigel	1, 5
(Netherlands) JR Motorsport	BMW M3 F80	246	(Netherlands) Ruud Olij	1, 5–6
(Belgium) NGT Racing	Porsche 718 Cayman GT4 RS Clubsport	268	(Belgium) Juna-Jane De Keersmaecker	6
(Belgium) NGT Racing	Porsche 718 Cayman GT4 RS Clubsport	268	(Belgium) Lars Zaenen	6
(Netherlands) Blueberry Racing	BMW M4 GT4 Evo (G82)	273	(Netherlands) Berry van Elk	All
(Netherlands) Mathijs Bakker	BMW M4 GT4 Evo (G82)	286	(Netherlands) Mathijs Bakker	4
(Netherlands) Mathijs Bakker	BMW M4 GT4 Evo (G82)	286	(Netherlands) Joshua Kreuger	4
Supersport
(Netherlands) DWS Racing	Cupra TCR	302	(Netherlands) Laurens de Wit	1–2
(Netherlands) DWS Racing	Cupra TCR	302	(Netherlands) Fabian Schoonhoven	1–2
(Denmark) Sally Racing	Cupra TCR	303	(Denmark) Nicolai Jonas	4
(Denmark) Sally Racing	Cupra TCR	303	(Denmark) Mikkel Obel	4
(Netherlands) Ferry Monster Autosport	Cupra TCR	305	(Netherlands) Bert de Heus	4
(Netherlands) Ferry Monster Autosport	Cupra TCR	305	(Netherlands) Jayden Post	4
(Netherlands) Ferry Monster Autosport	Cupra TCR	306	(Netherlands) Jordy van der Eijck	2
(Netherlands) Ferry Monster Autosport	Cupra TCR	323	(Netherlands) Priscilla Speelman	4
(Netherlands) Ferry Monster Autosport	Cupra TCR	323	(Netherlands) Teunis van der Grift	4, 6
(Netherlands) Ferry Monster Autosport	Audi RS 3 LMS TCR (2021)	307	(Netherlands) Oscar Gräper	1
(Netherlands) Ferry Monster Autosport	Audi RS 3 LMS TCR (2021)	307	(Netherlands) Lorenzo van Riet	1
(Netherlands) Koopman Racing	BMW M4 GT4 (F82)	320	(United Kingdom) Miles Wragg	4
(Netherlands) Koopman Racing	BMW M4 GT4 (F82)	321	(Netherlands) Emile Drummen	1–2, 4–6
(Netherlands) Koopman Racing	BMW M4 GT4 (F82)	321	(Netherlands) Tom Drummen	1–2, 4–6
(Netherlands) Koopman Racing	BMW M4 GT4 (F82)	332	(Netherlands) Maik Broersen	2
(Netherlands) Koopman Racing	BMW M4 GT4 (F82)	332	(Netherlands) Frank Broerson	2
(Netherlands) Munckhof Racing	BMW M2 GTR KK	322	(Netherlands) Eric van den Munckhof	1, 6
(Netherlands) Munckhof Racing	BMW M2 GTR KK	322	(Netherlands) Maik Barten	1, 6
(Netherlands) JR Motorsport	BMW M3 E46	333	(Netherlands) Remco de Beus	4–5
(Netherlands) HBR	BMW M3 E90	334	(Netherlands) Robert van den Berg	3–4
(Netherlands) HBR	BMW M3 E90	334	(Netherlands) Benjamin van den Berg	3–4
(Ukraine) Protasov Racing Team	Cupra TCR	359	(Ukraine) Nitesh Pal	2–3, 5
(Ukraine) Protasov Racing Team	Cupra TCR	359	(Ukraine) Sergii Pustovoitenko	2–3, 5
Supersport 2
(Netherlands) DayVtec Engineering	BMW M240i DayVtec	409	(Netherlands) André Seinen	4
(Netherlands) DayVtec Engineering	BMW M240i DayVtec	443	(Netherlands) Bas Voermans	4
(Netherlands) DayVtec Engineering	BMW M240i DayVtec	480	(Netherlands) Sander Jelgerhuis	4
(Netherlands) DayVtec Engineering	BMW M240i DayVtec	480	(Netherlands) Matthijs van Stapele	4
(Netherlands) MV Motorsport	BMW M2 CS-R	411	(Netherlands) Arie Roseboom	4
(Netherlands) Hans Weijs Motorsport	BMW M240i DayVtec	421	(Netherlands) Rick van Zijverden	4
(Netherlands) Racing Team Tappel	Zilhouette Supersport 2	444	(Netherlands) Henk Tappel	4
(Netherlands) Cor Euser Racing	BMW M3 E46	445	(Netherlands) Cor Euser	4
Sport
(Netherlands) Euser Racing	BMW M3 E46	500	(Netherlands) Cor Euser	7
(Belgium) Traxx Racing	Alpine A110 Cup	501	(Belgium) Chris Voet	1–3, 5, 7
(Belgium) Traxx Racing	Alpine A110 Cup	501	(Belgium) Bart van der Broeck	1
(Netherlands) Spirit Racing Team	Renault Clio Evo	502	(Netherlands) Rob Nieman	1–4, 6
(Netherlands) Spirit Racing Team	Renault Clio Evo	506	(Netherlands) Christian Dijkhof	1–3, 6
(Netherlands) Supreme Motorsport	BMW M3 E46	503	(Netherlands) Maarten Baggermans	1
(Netherlands) DWS Racing	Volkswagen Polo GTI Cup	507	(Netherlands) Laurens de Wit	3–6
(Netherlands) DWS Racing	Volkswagen Polo GTI Cup	507	(Netherlands) Fabian Schoonhoven	3–5
(Netherlands) DWS Racing	Volkswagen Polo GTI Cup	507	(Netherlands) Piet de Gier	6
(Netherlands) DWS Racing	Volkswagen Polo GTI Cup	508	(Netherlands) Fabian Schoonhoven	6
(Netherlands) DWS Racing	Volkswagen Polo GTI Cup	508	(Belgium) Chris Voet	6
(Netherlands) Certainty Racing	BMW M2 Racing (G87)	510	(Netherlands) Tim Schulte	6
(Netherlands) Certainty Racing	BMW M2 Racing (G87)	510	(Netherlands) Thijs Raaijmakers	6
(Netherlands) PJ Motorsport	Zilhouette Sport	511	(Netherlands) Jacob Kuil	5
(Netherlands) PJ Motorsport	Zilhouette Sport	511	(Netherlands) Mark Wieringa	5
(Netherlands) PJ Motorsport	Zilhouette Sport	544	(Netherlands) Herman Iwema	5
(Netherlands) PJ Motorsport	Zilhouette Sport	598	(Netherlands) Pieter de Jong	5
(Netherlands) PJ Motorsport	Zilhouette Sport	598	(Netherlands) Jack Hoekstra	5
(Netherlands) PJ Motorsport	Zilhouette Sport	599	(Netherlands) Bernard Blaak	5
(Netherlands) PJ Motorsport	Zilhouette Sport	599	(Netherlands) Lars Blaak	5
(Netherlands) Niemann Autosport	BMW M125i DayVtec	524	(Netherlands) Martijn Blonk	4
(Netherlands) CP Motorsport	BMW M2 Racing (G87)	527	(Netherlands) Henri Greven	1–3
(Netherlands) CP Motorsport	BMW M2 Racing (G87)	527	(Netherlands) Norbert Dekker	1–2
(Netherlands) CP Motorsport	BMW M2 Racing (G87)	527	(Netherlands) James De Bois	3
(Netherlands) Racing Team Tappel	BMW 130i	545	(Netherlands) Henk Tappel	6–7
(Netherlands) Racing Team Tappel	BMW 130i	545	(Netherlands) Harold Wisselink	6–7
(Netherlands) JMB Motorsport	BMW 130i	537	(Netherlands) Jeroen Juffermans	4
(Netherlands) Speedsport	Zilhouette Sport	561	(Netherlands) Mark Jobst	4
(Netherlands) Powermotorsports	BMW 125i M Sport (BTCC)	575	(Netherlands) John van der Voort	5, 7
(Netherlands) Powermotorsports	BMW 125i M Sport (BTCC)	575	(Netherlands) Sandra van der Sloot	5, 7
(Netherlands) RBM Motorsport	BMW M2 Racing (G87)	579	(Netherlands) Richard Blom	1
(Netherlands) Racing Team Pen	BMW 120i	595	(Netherlands) Lynn Pen	4

== Race results ==
Round		Circuit		
Round		Circuit	Pole position	Overall winners
1	R1	(Netherlands) Zandvoort	(Netherlands) No. 118 Koopman Racing	(Netherlands) No. 111 Koopman Racing
1	R1	(Netherlands) Zandvoort	(United Kingdom) Harry Barton	(Netherlands) Marlon Birdsall
1	R2	(Netherlands) Zandvoort	(Netherlands) No. 111 Koopman Racing	(Netherlands) No. 77 Zoet Racing
1	R2	(Netherlands) Zandvoort	(Netherlands) Marlon Birdsall	(Netherlands) Mitchell van Dijk
1	R3	(Netherlands) Zandvoort	(Netherlands) No. 111 Koopman Racing	(Netherlands) No. 111 Koopman Racing
1	R3	(Netherlands) Zandvoort	(Netherlands) Marlon Birdsall	(Netherlands) Marlon Birdsall
2	R1	(Belgium) Spa-Francorchamps	(Netherlands) No. 133 Koopman Racing	(Netherlands) No. 111 Koopman Racing
2	R1	(Belgium) Spa-Francorchamps	(Netherlands) Daan Meijer	(Netherlands) Marlon Birdsall
2	R2	(Belgium) Spa-Francorchamps	(Netherlands) No. 118 Koopman Racing	(Netherlands) No. 118 Koopman Racing
2	R2	(Belgium) Spa-Francorchamps	(United Kingdom) Harry Barton	(United Kingdom) Harry Barton
3	R1	(Belgium) Zolder	(Netherlands) No. 118 Koopman Racing	(Netherlands) No. 111 Koopman Racing
3	R1	(Belgium) Zolder	(United Kingdom) Harry Barton	(Netherlands) Marlon Birdsall
3	R2	(Belgium) Zolder	(Netherlands) No. 118 Koopman Racing	(Netherlands) No. 111 Koopman Racing
3	R2	(Belgium) Zolder	(United Kingdom) Harry Barton	(Netherlands) Marlon Birdsall
3	R3	(Belgium) Zolder	(Netherlands) No. 111 Koopman Racing	(Netherlands) No. 111 Koopman Racing
3	R3	(Belgium) Zolder	(Netherlands) Marlon Birdsal	(Netherlands) Marlon Birdsall
3	R4	(Belgium) Zolder	(Netherlands) No. 111 Koopman Racing	(Netherlands) No. 111 Koopman Racing
3	R4	(Belgium) Zolder	(Netherlands) Marlon Birdsal	(Netherlands) Marlon Birdsall
4	R1	(Netherlands) Assen	(Netherlands) No. 123 Koopman Racing	(Netherlands) No. 123 Koopman Racing
4	R1	(Netherlands) Assen	(Netherlands) Mex Jansen (Netherlands) Rocco Coronel	(Netherlands) Mex Jansen (Netherlands) Rocco Coronel
4	R2	(Netherlands) Assen	(Netherlands) No. 123 Koopman Racing	(Netherlands) No. 123 Koopman Racing
4	R2	(Netherlands) Assen	(Netherlands) Mex Jansen (Netherlands) Rocco Coronel	(Netherlands) Mex Jansen (Netherlands) Rocco Coronel
5	R1	(Germany) Hockenheim	(Netherlands) No. 111 Koopman Racing	(Netherlands) No. 111 Koopman Racing
5	R1	(Germany) Hockenheim	(Netherlands) Marlon Birdsall	(Netherlands) Marlon Birdsall
5	R2	(Germany) Hockenheim	(Netherlands) No. 111 Koopman Racing	(Netherlands) No. 118 Koopman Racing
5	R2	(Germany) Hockenheim	(Netherlands) Marlon Birdsall	(United Kingdom) Harry Barton
6	R1	(Netherlands) Zandvoort	(Netherlands) No. 111 Koopman Racing	(Netherlands) No. 111 Koopman Racing
6	R1	(Netherlands) Zandvoort	(Netherlands) Marlon Birdsall	(Netherlands) Marlon Birdsall
6	R2	(Netherlands) Zandvoort	(Netherlands) No. 111 Koopman Racing	(Netherlands) No. 118 Koopman Racing
6	R2	(Netherlands) Zandvoort	(Netherlands) Marlon Birdsall	(United Kingdom) Harry Barton
6	R3	(Netherlands) Zandvoort	(Netherlands) No. 111 Koopman Racing	(Netherlands) No. 111 Koopman Racing
6	R3	(Netherlands) Zandvoort	(Netherlands) Marlon Birdsall	(Netherlands) Marlon Birdsall
7	R1	(Netherlands) Assen	(Netherlands) No. 111 Koopman Racing	(Netherlands) No. 133 Koopman Racing
7	R1	(Netherlands) Assen	(Netherlands) Marlon Birdsall	(Netherlands) Daan Meijer
7	R2	(Netherlands) Assen	(Netherlands) No. 111 Koopman Racing	(Netherlands) No. 118 Koopman Racing
7	R2	(Netherlands) Assen	(Netherlands) Marlon Birdsall	(United Kingdom) Harry Barton
7	R3	(Netherlands) Assen	(Netherlands) No. 118 Koopman Racing	race abandoned due to barrier damage
7	R3	(Netherlands) Assen	(United Kingdom) Harry Barton	race abandoned due to barrier damage

=== Championship standings ===
Points were awarded to the top twelve classified finishers in every race, for the first two races points are cut in half.

Position	1st	2nd	3rd	4th	5th	6th	7th	8th	9th	10th	11th	12th	Pole (R1)
Points	24	22	20	18	16	14	12	10	8	6	4	2	1

==== GT Drivers' standings ====
Pos.	Driver	Team	(Netherlands) ZAN			(Belgium) SPA		(Belgium) ZOL				(Netherlands) ASS		(Germany) HOC		(Netherlands) ZAN			(Netherlands) ASS			Points
1	(Netherlands) Marlon Birdsall	(Netherlands) Koopman Racing	1	Ret	1	1	2	1	1	1	1	2	1	1	2	1	4	1	4	2	C	290
2	(United Kingdom) Harry Barton	(Netherlands) Koopman Racing	3	1	DNS	3	1	Ret	2	3	Ret	1	2	Ret	1	2	1	2	3	1	C	226
3	(Netherlands) Hein Koopman	(Netherlands) Koopman Racing						2	3	Ret	3	4	5	3	Ret	3	2	4	2	8	C	140
4	(Netherlands) Ted van Vliet	(Netherlands) JR Motorsport	4	4	3							5	3	5	5						C	106
5	(Netherlands) Gilles van Houtum	(Netherlands) Koopman Racing	5	2	6	Ret	3							2	Ret				6	3	C	92
6	(Netherlands) Daan Meijer	(Netherlands) Koopman Racing	2	Ret	2	2	Ret												1	Ret	C	68
7	(Netherlands) Richard Blom	(Netherlands) RBM Racing										7	7			5	5	5	Ret	7	C	62
8	(Netherlands) Cees Wijsman	(Netherlands) Koopman Racing	DNS	DNS	4											4	3	3			C	57
9	(Netherlands) Wessel Sandkuijl	(Netherlands) Koopman Racing										3	4	Ret	DNS				5	5	C	55
10	(Netherlands) Ivar Moens	(Netherlands) Koopman Racing	6	5	5	Ret	4														C	49
11	(Denmark) Dan Ringsted Jacobsen	(Denmark) Sally Racing										6	6						7	6	C	41
12	(Belgium) Wouter Manderveld	(Belgium) Mama's Nightmare					3	4	2	2											C	41
13	(Netherlands) Marcel Dekker	(Netherlands) Dekker Racing												4	3						C	38
14	(Belgium) Mathias Beke (Belgium) Lex Quintens	(Belgium) NGT Racing				4	5														C	34
15	(Germany) Jürgen Bender	(Germany) JB Racing												6	4						C	32
16	(Canada) Samantha Tan	(Netherlands) Koopman Racing												3	Ret						C	20
17	(Netherlands) Cor Euser	(Netherlands) Cor Euser Racing	7	3	Ret																C	16
18	(Netherlands) Henk Thuis	(Netherlands) Pumaxs Racing														Ret	6	Ret	Ret	4	C	16
Pos.	Driver	Team	(Netherlands) ZAN			(Belgium) SPA		(Belgium) ZOL				(Netherlands) ASS		(Germany) HOC		(Netherlands) ZAN			(Netherlands) ASS			Points

==== Supersport Plus Drivers' standings ====
Pos.	Driver	Team	(Netherlands) ZAN			(Belgium) SPA		(Belgium) ZOL				(Netherlands) ASS		(Germany) HOC		(Netherlands) ZAN			(Netherlands) ASS			Points
1	(Netherlands) Berry van Elk	(Netherlands) Maglr.com Racing	1	2	3	3	1	1	1	1	2	3	3	1	2	1	3	3	2	3	C	286
2	(Netherlands) Rogier de Leeuw (Netherlands) Patrick de Vreede	(Netherlands) Koopman Racing	3	5	5	2	4	3	3	2	1	2	2	3	3	2	2	2	3	2	C	267
3	(Netherlands) Steff de Borst (Note: Steff de Borst didn't participate in round 6 and was replaced by Jaap van Lagen) (Netherlands) Dennis de Borst	(Netherlands) Febo Racing Team	7	6	7	4	3	4	2	3	2	7	10	Ret	5	4	1	1	1	4	C	204
4	(Netherlands) Valentijn Greven (Netherlands) Ricardo van der Ende (Note: Ricardo van der Ende was entered in the No. 226 car during round 2 at Spa-Francorchamps)	(Netherlands) CP Motorsport	2	3	1	1	2	2	4	DNS	DNS										C	112
5	(Netherlands) Ruud Olij	(Netherlands) JR Motorsport	DSQ (Note: Ruud Olij was disqualified after his tyres where found not to be compliant with the Sportive Regulations)	1	4									2	1	3	Ret	5			C	102
6	(Netherlands) Patrick Grootscholten	(Netherlands) CP Motorsport	6	8	6	5	Ret					9	6								C	65
7	(Netherlands) Daaf Steentjes	(Netherlands) CP Motorsport	6	8	6	5	Ret					10	7								C	61
8	(Netherlands) Dennis Nelemans	(Netherlands) Niemann Autosport										1	1								C	48
9	(Netherlands) Jaap van Lagen	(Netherlands) Febo Racing Team														4	1	1			C	45
10	(Austria) Nikolaus Pigel	(Netherlands) Koopman Racing	5	7	8									Ret	4						C	42
11	(Netherlands) Thijs Wesseling	(Netherlands) CP Motorsport	4	4	2																C	40
12	(Belgium) Juna-Jane De Keersmaecker (Belgium) Lars Zaenen	(Belgium) NGT Racing														5	4	4			C	35
13	(Netherlands) Albert Jochems (Netherlands) Charles Zwolsman	(Netherlands) Niemann Autosport										4	5								C	34
14	(Netherlands) Luuk van Wijngaarden (Netherlands) Thomas Verhoek	(Germany) NFR Motorsports										5	4								C	34
15	(Netherlands) Mathijs Bakker (Netherlands) Joshua Kreuger	(Netherlands) Mathijs Bakker										8	9								C	19
16	(Netherlands) Jan van der Kamp (Netherlands) Mark Antonides	(Netherlands) CP Motorsport										6	12								C	16
17	(Denmark) Frank Laursen (Denmark) Mikkel Ryberg	(Denmark) Sally Racing										12	8								C	12
18	(Netherlands) Dante Rappange (Netherlands) Jop Rappange	(Netherlands) V8 Racing																	Ret	1	C	12
19	(Belgium) Pieter Jan Lefevre	(Netherlands) CP Motorsport										11	11								C	8
Pos.	Driver	Team	(Netherlands) ZAN			(Belgium) SPA		(Belgium) ZOL				(Netherlands) ASS		(Germany) HOC		(Netherlands) ZAN			(Netherlands) ASS			Points

==== Supersport Drivers' standings ====
Pos.	Driver	Team	(Netherlands) ZAN			(Belgium) SPA		(Belgium) ZOL (Note: Due to the lack of competitors in the Supersport class at Zolder, no points were awarded.)				(Netherlands) ASS		(Germany) HOC		(Netherlands) ZAN			Points
1	(Netherlands) Tom Drummen (Netherlands) Emile Drummen	(Netherlands) Koopman Racing	2	5	3	2	2					Ret	Ret	2	1	1	3	3	176
2	(Netherlands) Eric van den Munckhof (Netherlands) Maik Barten	(Netherlands) Munckhof Racing	DSQ (Note: Eric van den Munckhof was disqualified after his tyres where found not to be compliant with the Sportive Regulations)	2	2											2	1	1	82
3	(Netherlands) Laurens de Wit (Netherlands) Fabian Schoonhoven	(Netherlands) Niemann Autosport	3	3	4	1	5												81
4	(Netherlands) Teunis van der Grift	(Netherlands) Ferry Monster Autosport										1	3			Ret	2	2	78
5	(Ukraine) Nitesh Pal (Ukraine) Sergii Pustovoitenko	(Ukraine) Protasov Racing Team				4	4	1	DSQ	DNS	DNS			3	3				76
6	(Netherlands) Remco de Beus	(Netherlands) JR Motorsport										4	Ret	1	2				64
7	(Netherlands) Priscilla Speelman	(Netherlands) Ferry Monster Autosport										1	3						45
8	(Netherlands) Bert de Heus	(Netherlands) Ferry Monster Autosport				DNS						3	1						44
9	(United Kingdom) Miles Wragg	(Netherlands) Koopman Racing										2	2						44
10	(Netherlands) Jayden Post	(Netherlands) Koopman Racing										3	1						44
11	(Netherlands) Maik Broersen (Netherlands) Frank Broersen	(Netherlands) Koopman Racing				3	3												40
12	(Denmark) Nicolai Jonas (Denmark) Mikkel Obel	(Denmark) Sally Racing										5	4						34
13	(Netherlands) Lorenzo van Riet (Netherlands) Oscar Gräper	(Netherlands) Ferry Monster Autosport	1	1	Ret														25
14	(Netherlands) Jordy van der Eijk	(Netherlands) Ferry Monster Autosport					1												24
15	(Netherlands) Robert van den Berg (Netherlands) Benjamin van den Berg	(Netherlands) HBR						DSQ	1	1	1								0
Pos.	Driver	Team	(Netherlands) ZAN			(Belgium) SPA		(Belgium) ZOL				(Netherlands) ASS		(Germany) HOC		(Netherlands) ZAN			Points

==== Supersport 2 Drivers' standings ====
Pos.	Driver	Team	(Netherlands) ASS		Points
1	(Netherlands) Rick van Zijverden	(Netherlands) Hans Weijs Motorsport	1	2	47
2	(Netherlands) Cor Euser	(Netherlands) Cor Euser Racing	3	1	44
3	(Netherlands) Bas Voermans	(Netherlands) DayVtec Engineering	4	3	38
4	(Netherlands) André Seinen	(Netherlands) DayVtec Engineering	5	4	34
5	(Netherlands) Matthijs van Stapele (Netherlands) Sander Jelgerhuis	(Netherlands) DayVtec Engineering	7	5	28
6	(Netherlands) Henk Tappel	(Netherlands) Racing Team Tappel	2	Ret	22
7	(Netherlands) Arie Roseboom	(Netherlands) MV Motorsport	6	DNS	14
Pos.	Driver	Team	(Netherlands) ASS		Points

==== Sport Drivers' standings ====
Pos.	Driver	Team	(Netherlands) ZAN			(Belgium) SPA		(Belgium) ZOL				(Netherlands) ASS		(Germany) HOC		(Netherlands) ZAN			(Netherlands) ASS			Points
1	(Belgium) Chris Voet	(Belgium) Traxx Racing	4	3	1	1	1	2	2	1	1			1	6	2	4	4	4	2	C	235
2	(Netherlands) Rob Nieman	(Netherlands) Spirit Racing Team	2	2	3	2	2	3	4	3	2	3	1			5	2	2			C	211
3	(Netherlands) Laurens de Wit	(Netherlands) DWS Racing						1	1	2	3	2	Ret	2	1	1	6	1			C	158
4	(Netherlands) Fabian Schoonhoven	(Netherlands) DWS Racing						1	1	2	3	2	Ret	2	1	2	4	1			C	158
5	(Netherlands) Christian Dijkhof	(Netherlands) Spirit Racing Team	6	6	Ret	3	4	4	3	4	4					6	5	Ret			C	104
6	(Netherlands) Henri Greven (Netherlands) Norbert Dekker	(Netherlands) CP Motorsport	3	4	5	4	3	5	DNS	DNS	DNS										C	81
7	(Netherlands) Henk Tappel (Netherlands) Harold Wisselink	(Netherlands) Supreme Motorsport														3	1	3	3	Ret	C	52
8	(Netherlands) Maarten Baggermans	(Netherlands) Supreme Motorsport	1	1	2																C	47
9	(Belgium) Bart van den Broeck	(Belgium) Traxx Racing	4	3	1																C	43
10	(Netherlands) Martijn Blonk	(Netherlands) Niemann Autosport										4	2								C	40
11	(Netherlands) Jack Hoekstra (Netherlands) Pieter de Jong	(Netherlands) PJ Motorsport												4	2						C	40
12	(Netherlands) Jacob Kuil (Netherlands) Mark Wieringa	(Netherlands) PJ Motorsport												3	4						C	39
13	(Netherlands) Piet de Gier	(Netherlands) DWS Racing														1	6	4			C	38
14	(Netherlands) Jeroen Juffermans	(Netherlands) JMB Motorsport										5	3								C	36
15	(Netherlands) Tim Schulte (Netherlands) Thijs Raaijmakers	(Netherlands) Certainty Racing														4	3	5			C	35
16	(Netherlands) Richard Blom	(Netherlands) RBM Racing	5	5	4																C	34
17	(Netherlands) Herman Iwema	(Netherlands) PJ Motorsport												6	3						C	34
18	(Netherlands) Lynn Pen	(Netherlands) Racing Team Pen										6	4								C	32
19	(Netherlands) Bernard Blaak (Netherlands) Lars Blaak	(Netherlands) PJ Motorsport												5	5						C	32
20	(Netherlands) Mark Jobst	(Netherlands) Speedsport										1	Ret								C	23
21	(Netherlands) John van der Voort (Netherlands) Sandra van der Sloot	(Netherlands) Powermotorsports												Ret	DNS				1	3	C	23
22	(Netherlands) Cor Euser	(Netherlands) Euser Racing																	2	1	C	23
Pos.	Driver	Team	(Netherlands) ZAN			(Belgium) SPA		(Belgium) ZOL				(Netherlands) ASS		(Germany) HOC		(Netherlands) ZAN			(Netherlands) ASS			Points
