= Rocco Coronel =

Dutch racing driver (born 2010)

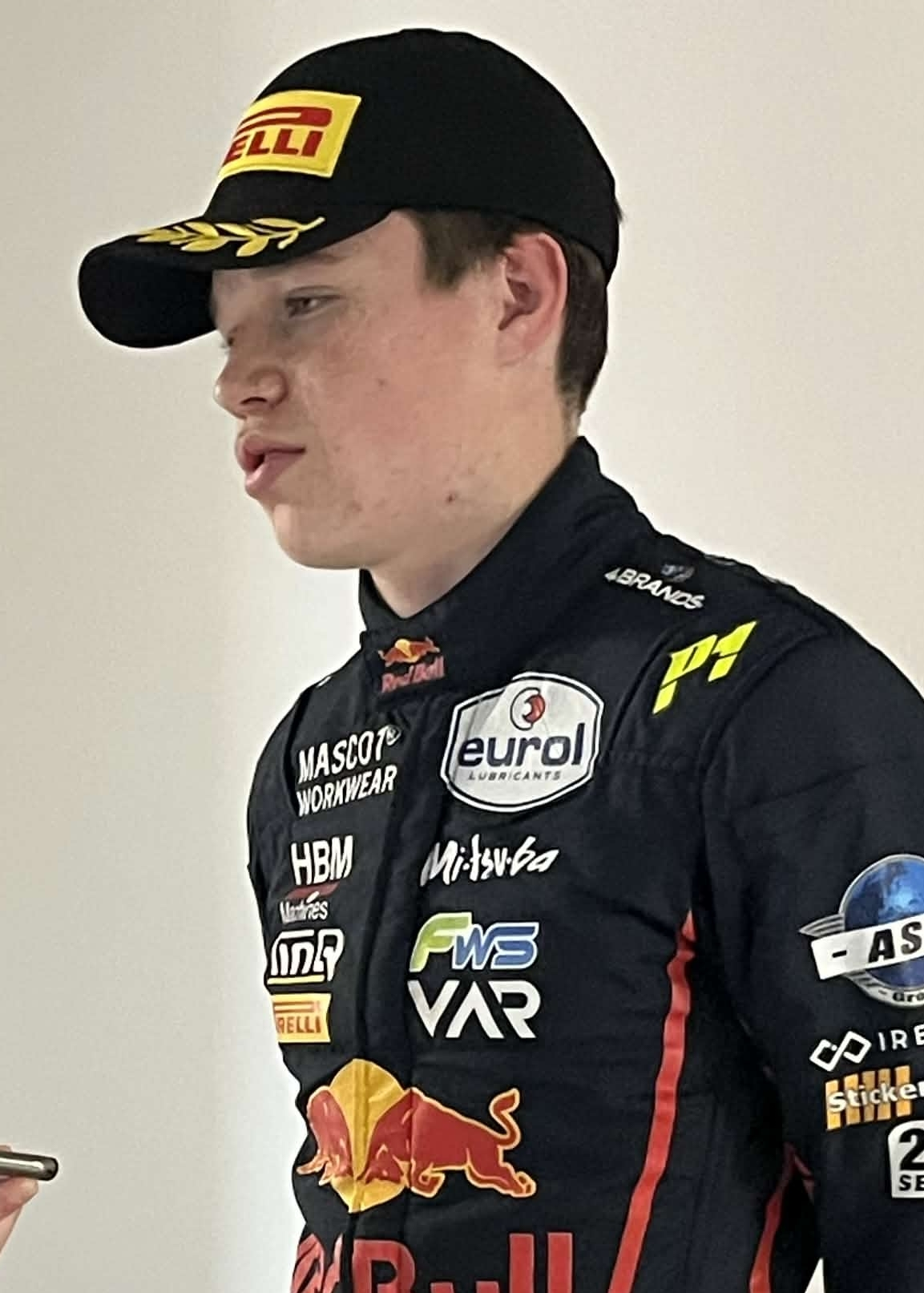
- Coronel in 2026
- Nationality: (Netherlands) Dutch
- Born: 23 October 2010 (age 16) Eemnes, Netherlands
- Relatives: Tom Coronel (father); Tim Coronel (uncle)

Championship titles
- 2025: Ginetta Junior Championship

Rocco Coronel (born 23 October 2010) is a Dutch racing driver who last competed for MP Motorsport in the F4 Spanish Championship as a member of the Red Bull Junior Team. He is the son of Tom Coronel, and won the 2025 Ginetta Junior Championship.

== Personal life ==
Coronel is the son of accomplished touring car racer Tom Coronel and fellow racing driver Paulien Zwart. He is also the nephew of Dakar regular Tim Coronel, brother of Tom.

== Career ==
=== Karting (2014–2025) ===
Coronel began driving karts in 2014, before making his competitive debut in 2021, a year in which he won the GK4 title and finished runner-up in the IAME Netherlands Series, both in mini karts. After winning the Junior SignMind title in 2022, Coronel began racing internationally in 2023, winning the IAME Series France and WSK Open Series, as well as taking third in the IAME Euro Series standings. In his final full-time year in karts, Coronel most notably finished third in the Karting World Championship, as well as taking fourth in the WSK Champions Cup and fifth in the Champions of the Future Euro Series.

=== Ginetta Juniors (2024–2025) ===
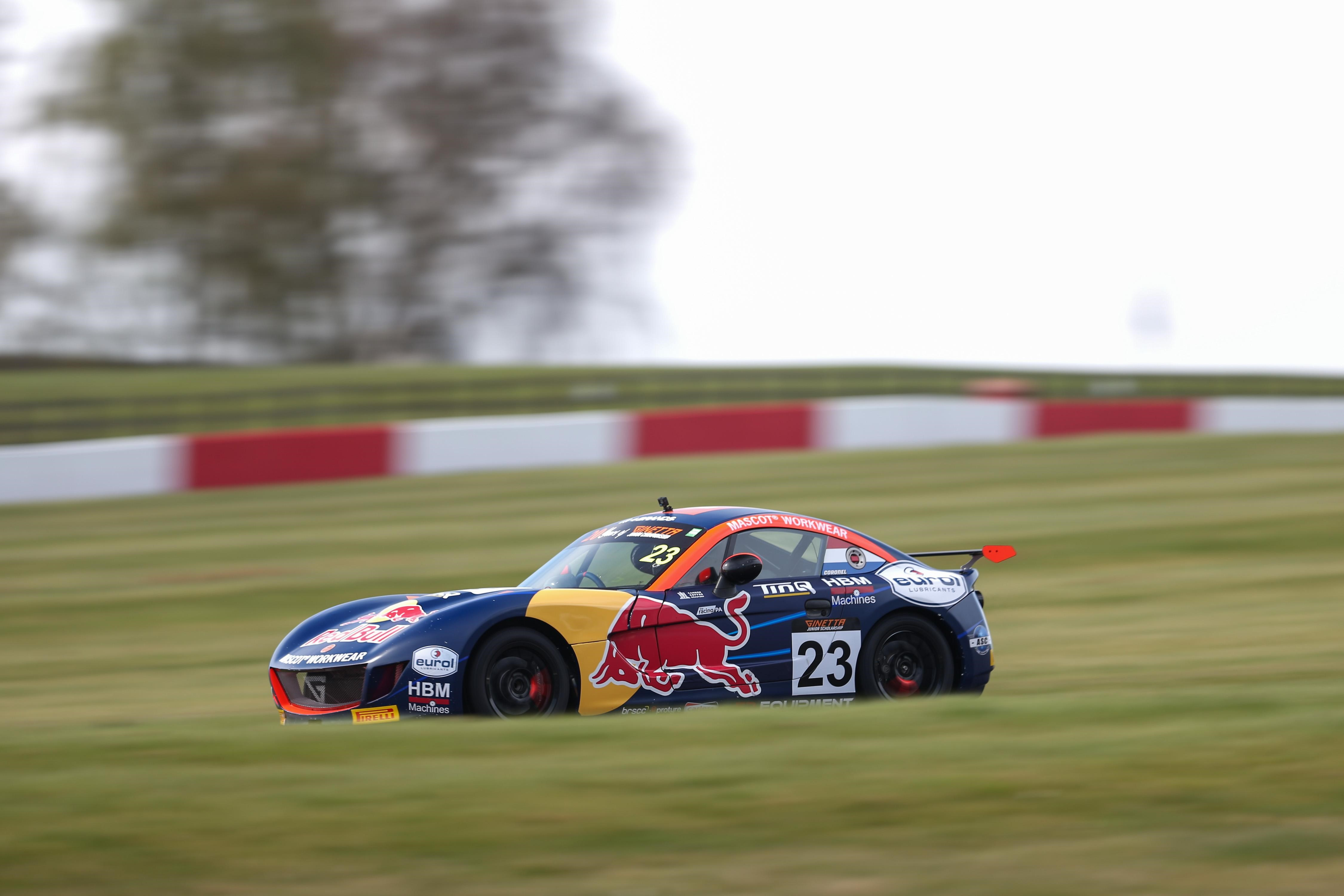
Coronel driving his R Racing Ginetta G40 at Donington Park in 2025.

In late 2024, Coronel made his car racing debut, competing in the Ginetta Junior Winter Series for R Racing, scoring two rookie podiums. Continuing with the team for the main season in 2025, Coronel began the year by winning twice at Donington Park, before winning all three races at Silverstone and twice at Oulton Park to take an early championship lead. Coronel then won four times between Snetterton and Zandvoort, and then finished on the podium six times in the next eight races to become the first Dutchman to clinch the Ginetta Juniors title, doing so with two races to spare.

=== Formula 4 (2025–present) ===
Towards the end of 2025, Coronel made his single-seater debut in the Barcelona finale of the F4 Spanish Championship for MP Motorsport, in which he finished third in race two, but was ineligible for points as he was a guest driver.

In early 2026, Coronel joined Van Amersfoort Racing to compete in the first three rounds of the Formula Winter Series, in which he took his maiden single-seater win in race two at Estoril. In parallel, Coronel also continued with MP Motorsport to race in the Eurocup-4 Spanish Winter Championship, in which he took four podiums and ended the season seventh overall. Following that, Coronel remained with MP for the main Spanish F4 season, which he kicked off by winning twice in Valencia, prior to winning again in Jerez and taking three other podiums in the final two rounds en route to third in overall points. During 2026, Coronel made a one-off cameo in Italian F4 for AKM Motorsport at Imola. At the end of November, he competed in the F4 World Cup.

=== Formula One ===
During 2024, Coronel joined the Red Bull Junior Team, after entering their Driver Search programme during the summer.

== Karting record ==
=== Karting career summary ===
Season	Series	Team	Position
2023	WSK Champions Cup — X30 Junior	VictoryLane	4th
2023	IAME Winter Cup — X30 Junior	VictoryLane	34th
2023	IAME Series France — X30 Junior		1st
2023	IAME Euro Series — X30 Junior	VictoryLane	3rd
2023	WSK Open Series — X30 Junior	VictoryLane; Aurelien Fath; Nicolas Martins (Note: Coronel competed for VictoryLane in round 1, for Aurelien Fath in round 2 and for Nicolas Martins in round 3.)	1st
2023	Karting Academy Trophy	Tom Coronel	11th
2023	Champions of the Future Euro Series — OK-J	VictoryLane	153rd
2023	Karting World Championship — OK-J	Nicolas Martins	38th
2023	IAME Warriors Final — X30 Junior	VictoryLane	NC
2023	WSK Final Cup — OK-J	Nicolas Martins	36th
2024	WSK Champions Cup — OK-J	Aurelien Fath	4th
2024	WSK Super Master Series — OK-J	VictoryLane	17th
2024	IAME Winter Cup — X30 Junior	VictoryLane	4th
2024	British Kart Championship — X30 Junior		43rd
2024	Champions of the Future Euro Series — OK-J	VictoryLane	5th
2024	Karting European Championship — OK-J	VictoryLane	12th
2024	Karting World Championship — OK-J	VictoryLane	3rd
2024	WSK Final Cup — OK-J	VictoryLane	4th
2025	WSK Super Master Series — OK	VictoryLane	19th

== Racing record ==
=== Racing career summary ===
Season	Series	Team	Races	Wins	Poles	F/Laps	Podiums	Points	Position
2024	Ginetta Junior Winter Series	R Racing	3	0	0	0	0	46	7th
2025	Ginetta Junior Championship	R Racing	22	11	4	4	19	660	**1st**
2025	F4 Spanish Championship	MP Motorsport	3	0	0	0	1	0	NC†
2026	Formula Winter Series	Van Amersfoort Racing	9	1	0	1	2	70	9th
2026	Eurocup-4 Spanish Winter Championship	MP Motorsport	9	0	0	1	4	57	6th
2026	F4 Spanish Championship	MP Motorsport	21	3	1	0	6	202	**3rd**
2026	BMW M240i Cup – Pro		9	7	8	7	8	*	*
2026	Supercar Challenge – GT	Koopman Racing	2	2	2	0	2	0	NC†
2026	Italian F4 Championship	AKM Motorsport	3	0	0	0	0	0	51st
2026	FIA F4 World Cup	MP Motorsport						—N/a	

* Season still in progress.

=== Complete Ginetta Junior Championship results ===
(key) (Races in bold indicate pole position; races in italics indicate fastest lap)

Year	Entrant	1	2	3	4	5	6	7	8	9	10	11	12	13	14	15	16	17	18	19	20	21	22	23	24	Pos	Points
2025	R Racing	DON1; 1; 6	DON1; 2; 1	DON1; 3; 1	SIL; 1; 1	SIL; 2; 1	SIL; 3; 1	**OUL**; **1**; 1	**OUL**; **2**; 1	OUL; 3; 2	SNE; 1; 2	SNE; 2; 1	SNE; 3; 1	**ZAN**; **1**; 1	ZAN; 2; 1	ZAN; 3; 2	BRH; 1; 3	BRH; 2; 3	BRH; 3; 2	CRO; 1; 8	CRO; 2; 3	CRO; 3; 3	**DON2**; **1**; 4	**DON2**; **2** DNS	DON2; 3 DNS	1st	660

=== Complete F4 Spanish Championship results ===
(key) (Races in bold indicate pole position; races in italics indicate fastest lap)

Year	Entrant	1	2	3	4	5	6	7	8	9	10	11	12	13	14	15	16	17	18	19	20	21	Pos	Points
2025	MP Motorsport	ARA; 1	ARA; 2	ARA; 3	NAV; 1	NAV; 2	NAV; 3	POR; 1	POR; 2	POR; 3	LEC; 1	LEC; 2	LEC; 3	JER; 1	JER; 2	JER; 3	CRT; 1	CRT; 2	CRT; 3	CAT; 1; 22	CAT; 2; 3	CAT; 3; 10	NC†	0
2026	MP Motorsport	CRT; 1; 1	CRT; 2; 1	CRT; 3; 4	POR; 1; 25	POR; 2; 5	POR; 3; 5	ARA; 1; 6	ARA; 2; 6	ARA; 3; 30	JAR; 1; 8	JAR; 2; 4	JAR; 3; 5	JER; 1; 8	JER; 2; 8	**JER**; **3**; 1	NAV; 1; 2	NAV; 2; 2	NAV; 3; 8	CAT; 1; 3	CAT; 2; 6	CAT; 3; 12	3rd	202

^{†} As Coronel was a guest driver, he was ineligible to score points.
* Season still in progress.

=== Complete Formula Winter Series results ===
(key) (Races in bold indicate pole position; races in italics indicate fastest lap)

Year	Entrant	1	2	3	4	5	6	7	8	9	10	11	12	13	14	15	Pos	Points
2026	Van Amersfoort Racing	EST; 1; 12	EST; 2; 1	EST; 3; 17	POR; 1; 4	POR; 2; 4	POR; 3; 9	CRT; 1; 2	CRT; 2 Ret	CRT; 3; 15	ARA; 1	ARA; 2	ARA; 3	CAT; 1	CAT; 2	CAT; 3	9th	70

=== Complete Eurocup-4 Spanish Winter Championship results ===
(key) (Races in bold indicate pole position; races in italics indicate fastest lap)

Year	Entrant	1	2	3	4	5	6	7	8	9	Pos	Points
2026	MP Motorsport	POR; 1 Ret	POR; SPR; 3	POR; 2; 3	JAR; 1; 28†	JAR; SPR; 30	JAR; 2; 21	ARA; 1; 3	ARA; SPR; 25	ARA; 2; 2	7th	57
